= Unpublished and uncollected works by Stephen King =

There are numerous unpublished works by Stephen King that have come to light throughout King's career. These include novels and short stories, most of which remain unfinished. Many of them were stored among Stephen King's papers in the special collections of the Raymond H. Fogler Library at the University of Maine, but the papers were removed in 2020. Additionally, there are a number of uncollected short stories, published throughout King's long career in various anthologies and periodicals, that have never been published in a King collection.

== Unpublished works ==
(Partial list)

=== Short stories ===
- 1959 "Charlie" (short story)
  The story consists of six pages (3,900 words), but ends mid-paragraph. A note states that pages are missing from the manuscript. The story concerns an asteroid miner who discovers a pink cube. A black substance starts to come out of the cube, driving the miner back to his small hut. As the mysterious black substance reaches the hut, it breaches the air locks and proceeds to consume the miner.
- 1960 People, Places and Things (short story collection)
  People, Places and Things is a self-published, magazine-sized collection of short stories written in 1960 together with King's friend Chris Chesley. The collection was published using King's brother's small printing press. It consists of a mere 18 hand-bound pages, and King estimates that only 10 copies were printed. Copies were sold to school friends for about $0.10 to $0.25 each. The original collection consists of nine short stories by King and nine by Chesley. According to King, the only surviving copy is in his possession.

- "I'm Falling" (lost)
- "The Dimension Warp" (lost)
- "The Hotel at the End of the Road": Two gangsters, Tommy Riviera and Kelso Black, take refuge in an old hotel whose ominous proprietor does not want money. He wants the men themselves – as part of his private museum of the dead.
- "I've Got to Get Away!": The narrator awakens, having no idea who he is. Shocked, he realizes that he is working at a conveyor belt and that he must get away. He attempts to escape, but is immediately captured by guards who reprogram him. The narrator is revealed to be a faulty robot who occasionally believes that it is a human. The story implies that the robot has experienced this consciousness many times before, only to forget it upon being reprogrammed.
- "The Thing at the Bottom of the Well": A small boy enjoys torturing animals: he tears out the wings of flies, kills worms, and mistreats a dog with needles. One day, he is lured into a well by a strange voice. When his body is found, his arms are severed from the body and there are needles in his eyes.
- "The Stranger": A thief and murderer are waylaid by the Grim Reaper.
- "The Cursed Expedition": Two astronauts land on Venus, finding an Earth-like atmosphere: the temperature is perfect, and delicious fruit grows. The two astronauts believe they have discovered the Garden of Eden. But when one of the crew is found dead, the survivor is too late in realizing that the planet itself is alive and hungry. The survivor and his rocket are eaten by the planet.
- "The Other Side of the Fog": A mysterious fog serves as a door between dimensions. Pete Jacobs involuntarily travels into the future (the year 2007), and eventually arrives in a world inhabited by dinosaurs. Helpless, he wanders from one dimension to the next, searching for his own kind.
- "Never Look Behind You!": This short story, written together with a friend, tells about a mysterious woman killing in a peculiar way.

- 1964 "The Star Invaders" (short story)
- 1974 "The Float": original version of "The Raft"
- 1984 "Keyholes" (unfinished): In the existing short fragment, King describes a concerned father talking to a psychiatrist about examining his son. The story circulates freely in the Stephen King internet community.
- 1990 "An Evening at God's": a one-act play, written for the Institute for Advanced Theater Training. The manuscript was auctioned in 1990.
- "Pinfall" (date unspecified, possibly unfinished)
- "But Only Darkness Loves Me" (date unspecified, unfinished): Today, only two pages of the typed and handwritten manuscript remain. The first page was typewritten, while the second was handwritten. The first and only part of the story (named "The Most Beautiful Girl in the World") concerns a boy who is talking to a beautiful girl in a bar in Ledge Cove, Maine. She is apparently too beautiful to look any other way but indirectly. She then invites the boy back to her hotel room, but he ends up leaving her in the lobby and not going to her room. This tale was written with King's eldest son Joseph (Joe Hillstrom King).
- Unnamed story, written in collaboration with Stephen R. Donaldson and several other writers to raise money for charity at a science fiction and fantasy convention. With no prior discussion, each wrote for 30 to 45 minutes, then folded the sheet so that the next writer had only their final line for context. Donaldson, who had to follow King's final line, called the resulting story "hysterically surreal".
- "I Hate Mondays" (date unspecified): This is one of 10 stories, including "But Only Darkness Loves Me", that were rediscovered by author Rocky Wood. The completed five-page story was written with King's younger son, Owen.
- "Comb Dump" (unfinished)

=== Novels ===
- 1963 The Aftermath (novel)

The Aftermath is a 50,000-word manuscript that describes life after a nuclear war, suggesting the Armageddon was August 14, 1967, at the time of the Cuban Missile Crisis. King began the novel at the same time he was beginning Getting It On (the story that would later become Rage).

- 1970 Sword in the Darkness (novel)

Sword in the Darkness is the longest of King's unpublished works, at approximately 150,000 words. Upon its completion in April 1970, it was rejected by 12 publishers. King has said that he now considers it unpublishable and intends for it never to be released to the public. The book's plot includes a character dealing with the suicide of his pregnant sister and the death of his mother from a brain tumor, as well as another character, a black activist lawyer, who incites a riot after speaking at a local high school.
In 2006, a lengthy excerpt from the book was published in Stephen King: Uncollected, Unpublished, by Rocky Wood et al. (Cemetery Dance Publications, March 2006). The excerpt related the backstory of one character, a teacher named Edie Rowsmith. It is effectively a stand-alone horror story in the style of the early Stephen King.

- 1974 The House on Value Street (unfinished)

The House on Value Street is the title of an unpublished novel. In his 1981 treatise on the horror genre, Danse Macabre, King describes his attempts to write a fictionalized novel about the kidnapping of Patty Hearst by the Symbionese Liberation Army. King talks about attempting multiple drafts from various angles, before deciding he could not finish the novel to his satisfaction. King does not describe the plot in any detail, except that the fictionalized SLA's headquarters would be in the eponymous house on Value Street.
In Danse Macabre, King examines how the seeds of effective horror fiction may be found in the cultural climate and political current events. He also credits his failure to complete The House on Value Street as the genesis of his apocalyptic best-seller The Stand. As King tells it, he began free-associating on his SLA research, and typed the sentence "Donald DeFreeze is a dark man." This first evocation of his recurring villain Randall Flagg, and the societal malaise at the center of Value Street, gave King the core ideas he needed to begin The Stand.

- 1976 Welcome to Clearwater (unfinished)
- 1976 The Corner (unfinished)
- 1977 Wimsey (unfinished): In an attempt to write an English novel, King moved to England, but the idea failed. In the small segment that exists, Wimsey and his driver go to a party at an estate which seems to be in the middle of nowhere. On their way, they have an accident on a bridge that is seemingly on the verge of collapse. The segment ends here.
- 1983 The Cannibals (a.k.a. Under the Dome) (unfinished): This unfinished story eventually developed into Under the Dome, published in 2009.
- 1983 The Leprechaun (unfinished): This story was written for King's son Owen King. In the story, Owen is playing in a garden when he sees his cat attacking what seems to be a small animal, only to discover that the cat is attacking a tiny man. At that point, the story ends. According to King, the rest of the story was lost from the back of his motorcycle; as such, there is no chance of the remainder being discovered. The remains of the story are available within the online King community. The story has similarities to the third and final segment "General" of the 1985 anthology film Cat's Eye directed by Lewis Teague and screenplay by King himself.
- 1987 Phil and Sundance (unfinished): This 80-page story, unearthed by a French Stephen King fan site, was written for a boy with muscular dystrophy. The terminally ill child was granted a wish from the Make-a-Wish Foundation and requested to meet Stephen King, who gave him this story. Little is known about the story itself. Phil and Sundance is now owned by Cemetery Dance, and there has been no talk of its publication.
- Hatchet Head (date unspecified)
- The Doors (possibly unfinished)
- George D.X. McArdle (unfinished)
- On the Island (unfinished): King said he spent "most of the fall working on, and winter... it's a piece of shit".

== Uncollected works ==
=== Short stories ===
(Partial list)

The following works may have been published in magazines, but not in collections:

- 1965 "I Was a Teenage Grave Robber"
- 1965 "Code Name: Mouse Trap"
- 1966 "The 43rd Dream"
- 1967 "The Glass Floor": King's first published story, which he sold for $35.00. The story concerns a man who goes to meet the grieving husband of his dead sister. The sister's husband explains that the woman died while working on a ladder in a room with a glass floor. Looking down, she became disoriented and fell from her ladder. The door to the room has since been plastered over to prevent more tragic accidents. The woman's brother breaks open the sealed door and walks into the glass-floored room, where he experiences a strange, trance-like vertigo from which he himself must be rescued.
- 1970 "A Possible Fairy Tale"
- 1970 "Slade"
- 1971 "The Old Dude's Ticker"
- 1976 "Weeds"
- 1977 "Before the Play" and "After the Play": uncollected original prologue and original epilogue to The Shining
- 1977 "The King Family and the Wicked Witch": In this short story written for the amusement of King's children, a jealous witch has cast a spell on the (then-four) members of the King family. The cursed family rescues an injured woodchuck that reveals itself to be a magical prince who was another of the witch's victims. The prince frees the family of their curse, then gives them enchanted cookies, which they trick the witch into eating. The cookies cause the witch to fart so violently that she blasts herself to the moon, and the family's happiness is restored.
- 1978 "Man with a Belly"
- 1978 "The Night of the Tiger"
- 1979 "The Crate"
- 1971 "The Blue Air Compressor" (revised 1981)
- 1985 "The Reploids"
- 1986 "For the Birds"
- 1994 "The Killer": a rewrite of I've Got to Get Away!
- 1994 "Jhonathan and the Witchs": An early short story written by a nine-year-old King. A poor cobbler's son named Jhonathan sets off to seek his fortune. On the way to visit the King to seek work, Jhonathan rescues a fairy and is given three magical wishes. The King tasks Jhonathan with destroying three witches, each of whom can only be killed in a certain way. Jhonathan uses his wishes to destroy the witches and is rewarded.
- 2012 A Face in the Crowd with Stewart O'Nan, published digitally in 2012 and then in a hardcover edition in 2023 along with Richard Chizmar's The Longest December
- 2017 "Thin Scenery": a play
- 2019 "Squad D"
- 2025 "The Extra Hour"
- 2026 "Dinah's Hat"

=== Poems ===
- 1968 "Harrison State Park '68"
- 1969 "The Dark Man"
- 1970 "Donovan's Brain"
- 1970 "She Has Gone to Sleep While"
- 1971 "Silence"
- 1971 "Woman with Child"
- 1972 "In the Key Chords of Dawn"
- 1972 "The Hardcase Speaks"
- 1988 "Dino"
- 2009 "Mostly Old Men"
