= Skybar (short story) =

Short story by Stephen King

- Short story by Brian Hartz and Stephen King
- Country: United States
- Language: English
- Genre: Horror short story

Publication
- Published in: The Do-It-Yourself Bestseller: A Workbook
- Publisher: Doubleday
- Media type: Print
- Publication date: 1982

Chronology
The Raft	Word Processor of the Gods

"Skybar" is a short story by Brian Hartz and Stephen King. The beginning and ending of the story were written by King and published in the 1982 book The Do-It-Yourself Bestseller: A Workbook, with the publisher, Doubleday, holding a competition in which readers were invited to complete the story by writing the middle portion. The entry by Brian Hartz was selected by King as the winner.

== Plot summary ==
The story begins with the unnamed narrator recalling the outcome of an event that took place 12 years prior when he was aged 11: "there were twelve of us when we went in that night, but only two of us came out – my friend Kirby and me. And Kirby was insane." The narrator recalls the Skybar Amusement Park, which closed down after a series of deaths that began with seventh grade student Randy Stayner falling 100 feet from the top of the "SkyCoaster" rollercoaster, with his body rolling into the Skybar Pond and never being recovered.

One night two months following Skybar's closure, the narrator's friend Brant Callahan - who is known for his dangerous and outlandish dares, such as persuading the group to stand facing railway lines on which bullets have been placed and await an oncoming train - persuades the group to sneak into Skybar and climb up the tracks to the top of the SkyCoaster. Although initially reluctant, the narrator and his friends Dewey Howardson, John Wilkenson, and Kirby agree. They are joined by seven members of the "White Dragons", a local street gang.

11 of the boys begin the 100 foot climb to the top of the rollercoaster track, with Kirby remaining on the ground. The rollercoaster track comprises twin rails with only occasional crosspieces, which the narrator compares to "a ladder without rungs". Climbing with his eyes closed, the narrator is alerted by screaming and splashes, followed by the sound of a rollercoaster car moving along the tracks towards him. Sliding to the bottom before the car can hit him, the narrator flees with Kirby. After looking back over his shoulder at the rollercoaster car, the narrator abandons Kirby; they are reunited outside the Park.

It is revealed that the other 10 boys who climbed the SkyCoaster jumped or fell to their deaths, and that when the narrator and Kirby looked back at the rollercoaster car, they saw the maimed corpse of Randy Stayner emerge from the car to pursue them. 12 years after the event, the narrator has dreams of the sight from which he wakes screaming, while Kirby has been confined to a psychiatric hospital.

== Publication ==
In 1982, Doubleday published The Do-It-Yourself Bestseller: A Workbook, a book, edited by Tom Silberkleit and Jerry Biederman, to help readers write fiction. Various authors, including King, contributed partial stories that readers were invited to complete. A competition judged by King was held between September 1982 and February 1983 to determine the best submission for King's story "Skybar", with 18-year old Brian Hartz's entry winning. King contributed the opening paragraphs of the story and the final line. Writing in 1998, Stephen J. Spignesi suggested it would be "difficult" to find a copy of the story, noting that The Do-It-Yourself Bestseller: A Workbook was out of print.

Tyson Blue suggests that the name of the story is derived from "the name of a popular candy bar in New England at the time Stephen King and I were growing up there".

== Reception ==
Rocky Wood describes the paragraphs contributed by King as "enticing", noting that "Skybar" exhibits "King's trademark style, quickly establishing the atmosphere." Michael R. Collings describes "Skybar" as "demonstrating traditional King stylistics and techniques: brand names and a painfully precise realism as a backdrop for fear". Tyson Blue describes "Skybar" as presenting "a few tantalizing hints of how things might go" and as being "a unique oddity in King's career", drawing comparisons to "The Cat from Hell", which also originated in a short story contest (but which, unlike "Skybar", was completed by King himself). Reviewing the version of the story coauthored by King and Brian Hartz, The Washington Post stated that Hartz "...manages to pull off a pretty decent imitation of King's style, with a Carrie-ish conclusion".

== See also ==
- Stephen King short fiction bibliography
