= The Glass Floor =

Short story by Stephen King

- Short story by Stephen King
- Country: United States
- Language: English
- Genre: Horror short story

Publication
- Published in: Startling Mystery Stories
- Publisher: Health Knowledge, Inc.
- Media type: Print
- Publication date: 1967

Chronology
The 43rd Dream	Cain Rose Up

"The Glass Floor" is a short story by Stephen King, first published in the autumn 1967 issue of Startling Mystery Stories. It was King's first professional sale.

== Plot summary ==
Charles Wharton visits Anthony Reynard, the recently widowed husband of Wharton's sister Janine, in his Victorian mansion, the appearance of which unsettles Wharton. Reynard tells Wharton that Janine died by falling off a ladder while dusting the mansion's East Room, breaking her neck. When Wharton asks to see the room, Reynard refuses, telling him the door to the room has been plastered over. When Wharton protests, Reynard's elderly housekeeper Louise explains that the East Room – which has a floor made entirely out of mirror glass – is regarded as "dangerous".

At Wharton's insistence, Reynard gives him a trowel and allows him to reopen the East Room, refusing to watch. Upon entering the room, Wharton is quickly disoriented by the mirrored floor; fancying that he is standing in mid-air, he panics because of experiencing a strange, trance-like vertigo, and calls for help. Reynard finds Wharton's body lying in the middle of the room; he removes it using a pole hook, leaving a small pool of blood on both the floor and ceiling. As he prepares to once again plaster the East Room shut, Reynard wonders "if there was really a mirror there at all".

== Publication ==
King wrote "The Glass Floor" in the summer of 1967 at the age of 19 as a sophomore. King was inspired to write the story when "...for no reason at all I began to wonder what it would be like to stand in a room whose floor was a mirror. The image was so intriguing that writing the story became a necessity." It was the first of several submissions over the course of two years to magazine editor Robert A. W. Lowndes to be accepted for publication. King earned $35 (equivalent to $338 in 2025) for the story, marking his first professional earnings from writing. "The Glass Floor" was first published in the autumn 1967 issue of Startling Mystery Stories. It was later republished (with some minor amendments) in issue #298 of Weird Tales in autumn 1990 and in issue #68 of Cemetery Dance in December 2012. A copy of the Starling Mystery Stories issue is held (with other papers of King's) in the Raymond H. Fogler Library at the University of Maine. In 2020, it was published as part of the trade hardcover Best of Cemetery Dance 2. In 2020, "The Glass Floor" was included in a deluxe edition of Night Shift published by Cemetery Dance Publications.

== Reception ==
Michael R. Collings described "The Glass Floor" as "derivative, depending upon Poe and Lovecraft for its situational and atmospheric horror", while regarding it as an improvement on the "workaday prose" of King's earlier work. Reviewing King's second professional sale, "The Reaper's Image", he noted that King "allow[ed] the mystery of the Delver mirror to develop its own power rather than imposing a mystery upon the characters, as he had done in 'The Glass Floor'." Collings describes the mirrored floor from the story as an example of King's "fascination with the deadly effects of 'machines'", noting that "human responses rather than the artifact itself generate the specific horror". Collings and David Engebretson suggested that "the reader can see reflected the potential Stephen King was about to fulfill". Darrell Schweitzer described "The Reaper's Image" as "quite similar to 'The Glass Floor', but [...] told more skilfully". Joseph Maddrey described the story as "an Edgar Allan Poe pastiche". George Beahm also regarded "The Glass Floor" as "derivative", but judged it to be "a first effort that requires no apology".

Revisiting the story after 23 years in 1990, King described the first several pages as "clumsy and badly written - clearly the product of an unformed story-teller's mind" but judged the climax to be "better than I remembered" with "a genuine frisson".

Rocky Wood notes two seeming factual errors in the story: Reynard's mansion bears the date 1770 but is contrastingly described as "Victorian" (1770 being part of the Georgian era) and "Revolutionary War vintage" (the American Revolutionary War lasting from 1775 to 1783).

== See also ==
- Stephen King short fiction bibliography
- Unpublished and uncollected works by Stephen King
