= Stephen King short fiction bibliography =

This is a list of short fiction works by Stephen King (b. 1947). This includes short stories, novelettes, and novellas, as well as poems. It is arranged chronologically by first publication. Major revisions of previously published pieces are also noted.

King is sometimes credited with "nearly 400 short stories" (or a similarly large number). However, all the known published pieces of short fiction are tabulated below. In all, 218 works are listed.

Most of these pieces have been collected in King's seven short story collections: Night Shift (1978), Skeleton Crew (1985), Nightmares & Dreamscapes (1993), Everything's Eventual (2002), Just After Sunset (2008), The Bazaar of Bad Dreams (2015), and You Like It Darker (2024); in King's five novella collections: Different Seasons (1982), Four Past Midnight (1990), Hearts in Atlantis (1999), Full Dark, No Stars (2010), and If It Bleeds (2020); and in the compilation Secret Windows: Essays and Fiction on the Craft of Writing (2000). Some of these pieces, however, remain uncollected.

== 1950s ==
=== 1959 ===
Title	Type	Originally published in	Collected in	Notes
"Land of 1,000,000 Years Ago"	short story		Uncollected	Self-published
Thirty-One of the Classics	novella		Uncollected	Self-published
"Jumper"	short story	Dave's Rag (1959)	Secret Windows (2000)	Self-published

== 1960s ==
=== 1960 ===
Title	Type	Originally published in	Collected in	Notes
"Rush Call"	short story	Dave's Rag (1960)	Secret Windows (2000)	Self-published
"The Cursed Expedition"	short story	People, Places and Things (1960)	Uncollected	Self-published
"I've Got to Get Away!"	short story	People, Places and Things (1960)	Uncollected	Self-published
"The Hotel at the End of the Road"	short story	People, Places and Things (1960)	Uncollected	Self-published
"Never Look Behind You"	short story	People, Places and Things (1960)	Uncollected	Self-published
"The Other Side of the Fog"	short story	People, Places and Things (1960)	Uncollected	Self-published
"The Stranger"	short story	People, Places and Things (1960)	Uncollected	Self-published
"The Thing at the Bottom of the Well"	short story	People, Places and Things (1960)	Uncollected	Self-published

=== 1963 ===
Title	Type	Originally published in	Collected in	Notes
"The Undead"	short story	The Undead (1963)	Uncollected	Self-published
"Trigger Finger"	short story	Trigger Finger (1963)	Uncollected	Self-published

=== 1964 ===
Title	Type	Originally published in	Collected in	Notes
"The Star Invaders"	short story	The Star Invaders (1964)	Uncollected	Self-published

=== 1965 ===
Title	Type	Originally published in	Collected in	Notes
"Codename: Mousetrap"	short story	The Drum (October 27, 1965)	Uncollected	Lisbon Falls High School publication
"I Was a Teenage Grave Robber"	short story	Comics Review (1965)	Uncollected	First published in Comics Review, 1965. Later reprinted in Stories of Suspense (1965) retitled as “In a Half-World of Terror”. Partly reprinted in The Stephen King Illustrated Companion (edited by Bev Vincent, 2009).

=== 1966 ===
Title	Type	Originally published in	Collected in	Notes
"The 43rd Dream"	short story	The Drum (January 29, 1966)	Uncollected	Lisbon Falls High School publication

=== 1967 ===
Title	Type	Originally published in	Collected in	Notes
"The Glass Floor"	short story	Startling Mystery Stories (Fall 1967)	Night Shift (2020 Deluxe Edition)	First professional story; republished in Weird Tales #298 (Fall, 1990)

=== 1968 ===
Title	Type	Originally published in	Collected in	Notes
"Cain Rose Up"	short story	Ubris (Spring 1968)	Skeleton Crew (1985)	
"Here There Be Tygers"	short story	Ubris (Spring 1968)	Skeleton Crew (1985)	
"Harrison State Park '68"	poem	Ubris (Fall 1968)	Uncollected	
"Strawberry Spring"	short story	Ubris (Fall 1968)	Night Shift (1978)	Collected heavily revised

=== 1969 ===
Title	Type	Originally published in	Collected in	Notes
"Night Surf"	short story	Ubris (Spring 1969)	Night Shift (1978)	Collected heavily revised
"The Reaper's Image"	short story	Startling Mystery Stories (Spring 1969)	Skeleton Crew (1985)	Collected heavily revised
"The Dark Man"	poem	Ubris (Fall 1969)	Uncollected	Republished as a standalone book (2013)
"Stud City"	short story	Ubris (Fall 1969)	Uncollected	Incorporated into The Body (1982)

== 1970s ==
=== 1970 ===
Title	Type	Originally published in	Collected in	Notes
"Slade"	short story	The Maine Campus (June 11 – August 6, 1970)	Uncollected	
"Graveyard Shift"	short story	Cavalier (October 1970)	Night Shift (1978)	
"Donovan's Brain"	poem	Moth (1970)	Uncollected	
"Silence"	poem	Moth (1970)	Uncollected	

=== 1971 ===
Title	Type	Originally published in	Collected in	Notes
"The Blue Air Compressor"	short story	Onan (January 1971)	Uncollected	Republished revised in Heavy Metal (July 1981)
"In the Key Chords of Dawn"	poem	Onan (January 1971)	Uncollected	
"I Am the Doorway"	short story	Cavalier (March 1971)	Night Shift (1978)	
"Brooklyn August"	poem	Io #10 (1971)	Nightmares & Dreamscapes (1993)	
"She Has Gone to Sleep While..."	poem	Contraband #1 (October 31, 1971)	Uncollected	Credited as 'Stephan King'
"Woman with Child"	poem	Contraband #1 (October 31, 1971)	Uncollected	Credited as 'Stephan King'
"The Hardcase Speaks"	poem	Contraband #2 (December 1, 1971)	Uncollected	Credited as 'Stephan King'

=== 1972 ===
Title	Type	Originally published in	Collected in	Notes
"Suffer the Little Children"	short story	Cavalier (February 1972)	Nightmares & Dreamscapes (1993)	
"The Fifth Quarter"	short story	Cavalier (April 1972)	Nightmares & Dreamscapes (1993)	As John Swithen
"Battleground"	short story	Cavalier (September 1972)	Night Shift (1978)	
"The Mangler"	short story	Cavalier (December 1972)	Night Shift (1978)	

=== 1973 ===
Title	Type	Originally published in	Collected in	Notes
"The Boogeyman"	short story	Cavalier (March 1973)	Night Shift (1978)	
"Trucks"	short story	Cavalier (June 1973)	Night Shift (1978)	
"Gray Matter"	short story	Cavalier (October 1973)	Night Shift (1978)	
"It Grows on You"	short story	Marshroots (Fall 1973)	Nightmares & Dreamscapes (1993)	Republished revised in Whispers (August 1982), collected further revised Nominee, Locus Award, 1983

=== 1974 ===
Title	Type	Originally published in	Collected in	Notes
"Sometimes They Come Back"	short story	Cavalier (March 1974)	Night Shift (1978)	

=== 1975 ===
Title	Type	Originally published in	Collected in	Notes
"The Lawnmower Man"	short story	Cavalier (May 1975)	Night Shift (1978)	
"The Revenge of Lard Ass Hogan"	short story	The Maine Review (July 1975)	Uncollected	Incorporated into The Body (1982)

=== 1976 ===
Title	Type	Originally published in	Collected in	Notes
"Weeds"	short story	Cavalier (May 1976)	Night Shift (2020 Deluxe Edition)	Appears in comic book form in Creepshow (1982) as "The Lonesome Death of Jordy Verrill" and reprinted in Dark Screams: Volume One (2014)
"The Ledge"	short story	Penthouse (July 1976)	Night Shift (1978)	
"I Know What You Need"	short story	Cosmopolitan (September 1976)	Night Shift (1978)	

=== 1977 ===
Title	Type	Originally published in	Collected in	Notes
"Children of the Corn"	short story	Penthouse (March 1977)	Night Shift (1978)	
"One for the Road"	short story	Maine (March/April 1977)	Night Shift (1978)	
"The Cat from Hell"	short story	Cavalier (June 1977)	Just After Sunset (2008)	
"The King Family and the Wicked Witch"	short story	Flint (August 25, 1977)	Uncollected	
"The Man Who Loved Flowers"	short story	Gallery (August 1977)	Night Shift (1978)	

=== 1978 ===
Title	Type	Originally published in	Collected in	Notes
"Jerusalem's Lot"	short story	Night Shift (February 1978)	Night Shift (1978)	
"The Last Rung on the Ladder"	short story	Night Shift (February 1978)	Night Shift (1978)	
"Quitters, Inc."	short story	Night Shift (February 1978)	Night Shift (1978)	
"The Woman in the Room"	short story	Night Shift (February 1978)	Night Shift (1978)	
"The Night of the Tiger"	short story	The Magazine of Fantasy & Science Fiction (February 1978)	Uncollected	
"Nona"	short story	Shadows (September 1978)	Skeleton Crew (1985)	
The Gunslinger	novella	The Magazine of Fantasy & Science Fiction (October 1978)	The Dark Tower: The Gunslinger (1982)	Collected revised; Nominee, Locus Award, 1978
"Man With a Belly"	short story	Cavalier (December 1978)	Uncollected	

=== 1979 ===
Title	Type	Originally published in	Collected in	Notes
"The Crate"	short story	Gallery (July 1979)	Uncollected	Appears in Fantasy Annual III (1981) and Shivers VI (2011). Appears in comic book form in Creepshow (1982); Nominee, Locus Award, 1980

== 1980s ==
=== 1980 ===
Title	Type	Originally published in	Collected in	Notes
The Way Station	novella	The Magazine of Fantasy & Science Fiction (April 1980)	The Dark Tower: The Gunslinger (1982)	Collected revised; Nominee, Nebula Award,1981; Nominee, Locus Award, 1981
"Big Wheels: A Tale of the Laundry Game (Milkman #2)"	short story	New Terrors Two (July 1980)	Skeleton Crew (1985)	
The Mist	novella	Dark Forces (August 1980)	Skeleton Crew (1985)	Nominee, World Fantasy Award, 1981; Nominee, Locus Award, 1981
"Crouch End"	short story	New Tales of the Cthulhu Mythos (October 1980)	Nightmares & Dreamscapes (1993)	Nominee, British Fantasy Award, 1981
"The Monkey"	short story	Gallery (November 1980)	Skeleton Crew (1985)	Collected heavily revised; Nominee, British Fantasy Award, 1982
"The Wedding Gig"	short story	Ellery Queen's Mystery Magazine (December 1980)	Skeleton Crew (1985)	

=== 1981 ===
Title	Type	Originally published in	Collected in	Notes
The Oracle and the Mountains	novella	The Magazine of Fantasy & Science Fiction (February 1981)	The Dark Tower: The Gunslinger (1982)	Collected revised
"The Jaunt"	short story	The Twilight Zone Magazine (June 1981)	Skeleton Crew (1985)	
The Slow Mutants	novella	The Magazine of Fantasy & Science Fiction (July 1981)	The Dark Tower: The Gunslinger (1982)	Collected revised
"The Man Who Would Not Shake Hands"	short story	Shadows 4 (October 1981)	Skeleton Crew (1985)	
"The Monster in the Closet"	short story	Ladies' Home Journal (October 1981)	Uncollected	Incorporated into Cujo (1981)
"The Bird and the Album"	short story	A Fantasy Reader (October 30, 1981)	Uncollected	Incorporated into It (1986)
The Gunslinger and the Dark Man	novella	The Magazine of Fantasy & Science Fiction (November 1981)	The Dark Tower: The Gunslinger (1982)	Collected revised
"The Reach"	short story	Yankee (November 1981)	Skeleton Crew (1985)	Originally titled "Do the Dead Sing?"; Nominee, World Fantasy Award, 1982

=== 1982 ===
Title	Type	Originally published in	Collected in	Notes
"Survivor Type"	short story	Terrors (July 1982)	Skeleton Crew (1985)	
"Before the Play"	short story	Whispers (August 1982)	Uncollected	Unused prologue to The Shining (1977)
Apt Pupil	novella	Different Seasons (August 27, 1982)	Different Seasons (1982)	Nominee, British Fantasy Award, 1983
The Body	novella	Different Seasons (August 27, 1982)	Different Seasons (1982)	
The Breathing Method	novella	Different Seasons (August 27, 1982)	Different Seasons (1982)	Winner, British Fantasy Award, 1983; Nominee, World Fantasy Award, 1983; Nominee, Locus Award, 1983
Rita Hayworth and Shawshank Redemption	novella	Different Seasons (August 27, 1982)	Different Seasons (1982)	
"The Raft"	short story	Gallery (November 1982)	Skeleton Crew (1985)	Nominee, Locus Award, 1983
"Skybar"	short story	The Do-It-Yourself Bestseller (August 1982)	Uncollected	Partial short story

=== 1983 ===
Title	Type	Originally published in	Collected in	Notes
"Word Processor of the Gods"	short story	Playboy (January 1983)	Skeleton Crew (1985)	Originally titled "The Word Processor"; collected heavily revised
"Uncle Otto's Truck"	short story	Yankee (October 1983)	Skeleton Crew (1985)	
Cycle of the Werewolf	novella	Land of Enchantment (November 1983)	Uncollected (standalone book)	
"The Return of Timmy Baterman"	short story	Satyricon II (1983)	Uncollected	Incorporated into Pet Sematary (1983)

=== 1984 ===
Title	Type	Originally published in	Collected in	Notes
"Gramma"	short story	Weirdbook (Spring 1984)	Skeleton Crew (1985)	
"Mrs. Todd's Shortcut"	short story	Redbook (May 1984)	Skeleton Crew (1985)	
The Ballad of the Flexible Bullet	novella	The Magazine of Fantasy & Science Fiction (June 1984)	Skeleton Crew (1985)	Nominee, World Fantasy Award, 1985; Nominee, Locus Award, 1985
"The Revelations of 'Becka Paulson"	short story	Rolling Stone (July 19 – August 2, 1984)	Uncollected	Collected in the limited edition of Skeleton Crew (1985); incorporated into The Tommyknockers (1987)
"Beachworld"	short story	Weird Tales (Fall 1984)	Skeleton Crew (1985)	

=== 1985 ===
Title	Type	Originally published in	Collected in	Notes
Dolan's Cadillac	novella	Castle Rock (February – June 1985)	Nightmares & Dreamscapes (1993)	
"For Owen"	poem	Skeleton Crew (June 1985)	Skeleton Crew (1985)	
"Morning Deliveries (Milkman #1)"	short story	Skeleton Crew (June 1985)	Skeleton Crew (1985)	
"Paranoid: A Chant"	poem	Skeleton Crew (June 1985)	Skeleton Crew (1985)	

=== 1986 ===
Title	Type	Originally published in	Collected in	Notes
"For the Birds"	short story	Bred Any Good Rooks Lately? (September 1986)	Uncollected	
"The End of the Whole Mess"	short story	Omni (October 1986)	Nightmares & Dreamscapes (1993)	Nominee, World Fantasy Award, 1987

=== 1987 ===
Title	Type	Originally published in	Collected in	Notes
"Popsy"	short story	asques II: All-New Stories of Horror and the Supernatural (June 1987)	Nightmares & Dreamscapes (1993)	
"The Doctor's Case"	short story	The New Adventures of Sherlock Holmes (November 1987)	Nightmares & Dreamscapes (1993)	

=== 1988 ===
Title	Type	Originally published in	Collected in	Notes
"The Night Flier"	short story	Prime Evil (June 1988)	Nightmares & Dreamscapes (1993)	Nominee, Bram Stoker Award, 1989
"Dedication"	short story	Night Visions 5 (July 1, 1988)	Nightmares & Dreamscapes (1993)	
"The Reploids"	short story	Night Visions 5 (July 1, 1988)	Uncollected	
"Sneakers"	short story	Night Visions 5 (July 1, 1988)	Nightmares & Dreamscapes (1993)	
"My Pretty Pony"	short story	My Pretty Pony (December 1988)	Nightmares & Dreamscapes (1993)	Collected revised

=== 1989 ===
Title	Type	Originally published in	Collected in	Notes
"Rainy Season"	short story	Midnight Graffiti (Spring 1989)	Nightmares & Dreamscapes (1993)	
"Home Delivery"	short story	Book of the Dead (June 1989)	Nightmares & Dreamscapes (1993)	

== 1990s ==
=== 1990 ===
Title	Type	Originally published in	Collected in	Notes
The Langoliers	novella	Four Past Midnight (September 1990)	Four Past Midnight (1990)	Nominee, Bram Stoker Award, 1991
The Library Policeman	novella	Four Past Midnight (September 1990)	Four Past Midnight (1990)	
Secret Window, Secret Garden	novella	Four Past Midnight (September 1990)	Four Past Midnight (1990)	
The Sun Dog	novella	Four Past Midnight (September 1990)	Four Past Midnight (1990)	
"The Bear"	short story	The Magazine of Fantasy & Science Fiction (December 1990)	Uncollected	Incorporated into The Dark Tower III: The Waste Lands (1991)
"The Moving Finger"	short story	The Magazine of Fantasy & Science Fiction (December 1990)	Nightmares & Dreamscapes (1993)	

=== 1992 ===
Title	Type	Originally published in	Collected in	Notes
"You Know They Got a Hell of a Band"	short story	Shock Rock (January 1992)	Nightmares & Dreamscapes (1993)	Collected heavily revised
"Chattery Teeth"	short story	Cemetery Dance (Fall 1992)	Nightmares & Dreamscapes (1993)	

=== 1993 ===
Title	Type	Originally published in	Collected in	Notes
"The Beggar and the Diamond"	short story	Nightmares & Dreamscapes (September 1993)	Nightmares & Dreamscapes (1993)	
"The House on Maple Street"	short story	Nightmares & Dreamscapes (September 1993)	Nightmares & Dreamscapes (1993)	
"Sorry, Right Number"	teleplay	Nightmares & Dreamscapes (September 1993)	Nightmares & Dreamscapes (1993)	Written in 1987
"The Ten O'Clock People"	short story	Nightmares & Dreamscapes (September 1993)	Nightmares & Dreamscapes (1993)	Nominee, Locus Award, 1994
"Umney's Last Case"	short story	Nightmares & Dreamscapes (September 1993)	Nightmares & Dreamscapes (1993)	
"Jhonathan and the Witchs"	short story	First Words (October 1993)	Uncollected	Written in 1956-1957

=== 1994 ===
Title	Type	Originally published in	Collected in	Notes
"The Killer"	short story	Famous Monsters of Filmland #202 (Spring 1994)	Uncollected	Written in the mid-1960s
"Blind Willie"	short story	Antaeus #75/76 (October 1994)	Hearts in Atlantis (1999)	Collected heavily revised
"The Man in the Black Suit"	short story	The New Yorker (October 31, 1994)	Everything's Eventual (2002)	Winner, World Fantasy Award, 1995
"Dino"	poem	Salt Hill Journal (Fall 1994)	Uncollected	

=== 1995 ===
Title	Type	Originally published in	Collected in	Notes
"Luckey Quarter"	short story	USA Weekend (June 30 – July 2, 1995)	Everything's Eventual (2002)	
"Lunch at the Gotham Café"	short story	Dark Love (November 1995)	Everything's Eventual (2002)	Winner, Bram Stoker Award, 1996; Nominee, Locus Award, 1996

=== 1997 ===
Title	Type	Originally published in	Collected in	Notes
"Autopsy Room Four"	short story	Six Stories (April 1997)	Everything's Eventual (2002)	Nominee, Bram Stoker Award, 1999
"L. T.'s Theory of Pets"	short story	Six Stories (April 1997)	Everything's Eventual (2002)	
"General"	screenplay	Screamplays (September 1997)	Uncollected	Written around 1985 for the film Cat's Eye (1985)
Everything's Eventual	novella	The Magazine of Fantasy & Science Fiction (October–November 1997)	Everything's Eventual (2002)	Nominee, Bram Stoker Award, 1998; Nominee, Locus Award, 1998

=== 1998 ===
Title	Type	Originally published in	Collected in	Notes
"That Feeling, You Can Only Say What It Is in French"	short story	The New Yorker (June 22, 1998)	Everything's Eventual (2002)	
The Little Sisters of Eluria	novella	Legends (October 1998)	Everything's Eventual (2002)	

=== 1999 ===
Title	Type	Originally published in	Collected in	Notes
"The New Lieutenant's Rap"	short story	The New Lieutenant's Rap (April 1999)	Uncollected	Incorporated into "Why We're in Vietnam" (1999)
"The Road Virus Heads North"	short story	999 (September 7, 1999)	Everything's Eventual (2002)	
Hearts in Atlantis	novella	Hearts in Atlantis (September 14, 1999)	Hearts in Atlantis (1999)	
Heavenly Shades of Night Are Falling	short story	Hearts in Atlantis (September 14, 1999)	Hearts in Atlantis (1999)	
Low Men in Yellow Coats	novella	Hearts in Atlantis (September 14, 1999)	Hearts in Atlantis (1999)	Nominee, Bram Stoker Award, 2000
Why We're in Vietnam	novella	Hearts in Atlantis (September 14, 1999)	Hearts in Atlantis (1999)	
"1408"	short story	Blood and Smoke (November 1999)	Everything's Eventual (2002)	Originally published in an audiobook collection
"In the Deathroom"	short story	Blood and Smoke (November 1999)	Everything's Eventual (2002)	Originally published in an audiobook collection

== 2000s ==
=== 2000 ===
Title	Type	Originally published in	Collected in	Notes
Riding the Bullet	novella	Riding the Bullet (March 14, 2000)	Everything's Eventual (2002)	Originally published as an ebook Nominee, Bram Stoker Award, 2001
"The Old Dude's Ticker"	short story	NECON XX (July 2000)	Uncollected	Written in the early 1970s

=== 2001 ===
Title	Type	Originally published in	Collected in	Notes
"All That You Love Will Be Carried Away"	short story	The New Yorker (January 29, 2001)	Everything's Eventual (2002)	
"Calla Bryn Sturgis"	short story	stephenking.com (2001)	Uncollected	Incorporated into The Dark Tower V: Wolves of the Calla (2003)
"The Death of Jack Hamilton"	short story	The New Yorker (December 24–31, 2001)	Everything's Eventual (2002)	

=== 2003 ===
Title	Type	Originally published in	Collected in	Notes
"The Tale of Gray Dick"	short story	McSweeney's Mammoth Treasury of Thrilling Tales (March 25, 2003)	Uncollected	Incorporated into The Dark Tower V: Wolves of the Calla (2003)
"Harvey's Dream"	short story	The New Yorker (June 30, 2003)	Just After Sunset (2008)	Nominee, Bram Stoker Award, 2004
"Stationary Bike"	short story	Borderlands 5 (November 2003)	Just After Sunset (2008)	
"Rest Stop"	short story	Esquire (December 2003)	Just After Sunset (2008)	

=== 2004 ===
Title	Type	Originally published in	Collected in	Notes
"Lisey and the Madman"	short story	McSweeney’s Enchanted Chamber of Astonishing Stories (2004)	Uncollected	Incorporated into Lisey's Story (2006); Nominee, Bram Stoker Award, 2005

=== 2005 ===
Title	Type	Originally published in	Collected in	Notes
"The Things They Left Behind"	short story	Transgressions (May 2005)	Just After Sunset (2008)	Nominee, Bram Stoker Award, 2006
"The Furnace"	short story	Weekly Reader (September 2005)	Uncollected	Partial short story

=== 2006 ===
Title	Type	Originally published in	Collected in	Notes
"Memory"	short story	Tin House #28 (July 2006)	Blaze (2007)	Incorporated into Duma Key (2008)
"Willa"	short story	Playboy (December 2006)	Just After Sunset (2008)	

=== 2007 ===
Title	Type	Originally published in	Collected in	Notes
"Graduation Afternoon"	short story	Postscripts (March 2007)	Just After Sunset (2008)	Nominee, Locus Award, 2008
The Gingerbread Girl	novella	Esquire (July 2007)	Just After Sunset (2008)	
"Ayana"	short story	The Paris Review (Fall 2007)	Just After Sunset (2008)	
"Mute"	short story	Playboy (December 2007)	Just After Sunset (2008)	

=== 2008 ===
Title	Type	Originally published in	Collected in	Notes
A Very Tight Place	novella	McSweeney's #27 (Spring 2008)	Just After Sunset (2008)	
"The New York Times at Special Bargain Rates"	short story	The Magazine of Fantasy & Science Fiction (October/November 2008)	Just After Sunset (2008)	
N.	novella	Just After Sunset (November 2008)	Just After Sunset (2008)	Nominee, British Fantasy Award, 2009

=== 2009 ===
Title	Type	Originally published in	Collected in	Notes
Throttle	novella	He Is Legend (February 7, 2009)	Uncollected	In collaboration with Joe Hill, part of Hill's collection Full Throttle
Ur	novella	Ur (February 12, 2009)	The Bazaar of Bad Dreams (2015)	Originally published as an ebook; collected heavily revised
Morality	novella	Esquire (July 2009)	The Bazaar of Bad Dreams (2015)	Previously included with the trade edition of Blockade Billy (2010); Winner, Shirley Jackson Award, 2009
"Mostly Old Men"	poem	Tin House #40 (August 2009)	Uncollected	
"The Bone Church"	poem	Playboy (November 2009)	The Bazaar of Bad Dreams (2015)	
"Premium Harmony"	short story	The New Yorker (November 9, 2009)	The Bazaar of Bad Dreams (2015)	

== 2010s ==
=== 2010 ===
Title	Type	Originally published in	Collected in	Notes
"Tommy"	poem	Playboy (March 2010)	The Bazaar of Bad Dreams (2015)	
Blockade Billy	novella	Blockade Billy (April 2010)	The Bazaar of Bad Dreams (2015)	
1922	novella	Full Dark, No Stars (November 2010)	Full Dark, No Stars (2010)	Nominee, British Fantasy Award, 2011
Big Driver	novella	Full Dark, No Stars (November 2010)	Full Dark, No Stars (2010)	
Fair Extension	novella	Full Dark, No Stars (November 2010)	Full Dark, No Stars (2010)	
A Good Marriage	novella	Full Dark, No Stars (November 2010)	Full Dark, No Stars (2010)	

=== 2011 ===
Title	Type	Originally published in	Collected in	Notes
"Herman Wouk Is Still Alive"	short story	The Atlantic (May 2011)	The Bazaar of Bad Dreams (2015)	Winner, Bram Stoker Award, 2012
"Under the Weather"	short story	Paperback edition of Full Dark, No Stars (May 2011)	The Bazaar of Bad Dreams (2015)	
Mile 81	novella	Mile 81 (September 1, 2011)	The Bazaar of Bad Dreams (2015)	Originally published as an ebook
"The Little Green God of Agony"	short story	A Book of Horrors (September 29, 2011)	The Bazaar of Bad Dreams (2015)	Adapted into a webcomic; Nominee, Locus Award, 2012
"The Dune"	short story	Granta #117 (Fall 2011)	The Bazaar of Bad Dreams (2015)	

=== 2012 ===
Title	Type	Originally published in	Collected in	Notes
In the Tall Grass	novella	Esquire (June/July–August 2012)	Uncollected	In collaboration with Joe Hill, part of Hill's collection Full Throttle
A Face in the Crowd	novella	A Face in the Crowd (August 21, 2012)	Uncollected	Originally published as an ebook; in collaboration with Stewart O'Nan
"Batman and Robin Have an Altercation"	short story	Harper's Magazine (September 2012)	The Bazaar of Bad Dreams (2015)	

=== 2013 ===
Title	Type	Originally published in	Collected in	Notes
"Afterlife"	short story	Tin House #56 (June 2013)	The Bazaar of Bad Dreams (2015)	
"The Rock and Roll Dead Zone"	short story	Hard Listening (June 18, 2013)	Uncollected	Originally published as an ebook
"Summer Thunder"	short story	Turn Down the Lights (December 2013)	The Bazaar of Bad Dreams (2015)	

=== 2014 ===
Title	Type	Originally published in	Collected in	Notes
"Bad Little Kid"	short story	Bad Little Kid (March 14, 2014)	The Bazaar of Bad Dreams (2015)	Originally published as an ebook in French and German languages only
"That Bus Is Another World"	short story	Esquire (August 2014)	The Bazaar of Bad Dreams (2015)	

=== 2015 ===
Title	Type	Originally published in	Collected in	Notes
"A Death"	short story	The New Yorker (March 9, 2015)	The Bazaar of Bad Dreams (2015)	
"Drunken Fireworks"	short story	Drunken Fireworks (June 30, 2015)	The Bazaar of Bad Dreams (2015)	Originally published as an audiobook
"Mister Yummy"	short story	The Bazaar of Bad Dreams (November 2015)	The Bazaar of Bad Dreams (2015)	
"Obits"	short story	The Bazaar of Bad Dreams (November 2015)	The Bazaar of Bad Dreams (2015)	Nominee, Hugo Award, 2016

=== 2016 ===
Title	Type	Originally published in	Collected in	Notes
"Cookie Jar"	short story	Virginia Quarterly Review (Spring 2016)	Uncollected	Included in the paperback edition of The Bazaar of Bad Dreams
"The Music Room"	short story	Playboy (December 2016)	Uncollected	Included with audiobook of Gwendy's Button Box and paperback edition of You Like It Darker

=== 2017 ===
Title	Type	Originally published in	Collected in	Notes
Gwendy's Button Box	novella	Gwendy's Button Box (May 2017)	Uncollected (standalone book)	written with Richard Chizmar
"Thin Scenery"	play	Ploughshares (Summer 2017)	Uncollected	

=== 2018 ===
Title	Type	Originally published in	Collected in	Notes
"Laurie"	short story	stephenking.com (May 17, 2018)	You Like It Darker (2024)	Free download; included in the Elevation audiobook
"The Turbulence Expert"	short story	Flight or Fright (September 4, 2018)	You Like It Darker (2024)	
Elevation	novella	Elevation (October 2018)	Uncollected (standalone book)	

=== 2019 ===
Title	Type	Originally published in	Collected in	Notes
"Squad D"	short story	Shivers VIII (April 18, 2019)	Uncollected	written in the late 1970s; first published in German two months earlier

== 2020s ==
=== 2020 ===
Title	Type	Originally published in	Collected in	Notes
"The Fifth Step"	short story	Harper's Magazine (March 2020)	You Like It Darker (2024)	
If It Bleeds	novella	If It Bleeds (April 2020)	If It Bleeds (2020)	First novella in the Holly Gibney Series
"The Life of Chuck"	novella	If It Bleeds (April 2020)	If It Bleeds (2020)	
Mr. Harrigan's Phone	novella	If It Bleeds (April 2020)	If It Bleeds (2020)	
Rat	novella	If It Bleeds (April 2020)	If It Bleeds (2020)	
"On Slide Inn Road"	short story	Esquire Magazine (October/November 2020)	You Like It Darker (2024)	

=== 2021 ===
Title	Type	Originally published in	Collected in	Notes
"Red Screen"	short story	Humble Bundle (September 9, 2021)	You Like It Darker (2024)	Originally published as e-book

=== 2022 ===
Title	Type	Originally published in	Collected in	Notes
"Willie the Weirdo"	short story	McSweeney's 66 (Spring 2022)	You Like It Darker (2024)	Originally planned for #65 in 2021, postponed to #66 for Spring 2022
"Finn"	short story	Scribd (May 25, 2022)	You Like It Darker (2024)	Originally released as ebook and audiobook

=== 2024 ===
Title	Type	Originally published in	Collected in	Notes
The Answer Man	novella	You Like It Darker (May 2024)	You Like It Darker (2024)	
Danny Coughlin's Bad Dream	novella	You Like It Darker (May 2024)	You Like It Darker (2024)	
The Dreamers	novella	You Like It Darker (May 2024)	You Like It Darker (2024)	
Rattlesnakes	novella	You Like It Darker (May 2024)	You Like It Darker (2024)	
Two Talented Bastids	novella	You Like It Darker (May 2024)	You Like It Darker (2024)	

=== 2025 ===
Title	Type	Originally published in	Collected in	Notes
"The Extra Hour"	short story	Cemetery Dance Publications Magazine #79 (January 2025)	Uncollected	
"Hansel and Gretel"	short story	Hansel and Gretel (September 2025)	Uncollected (standalone book)	

=== 2026 ===
Title	Type	Originally published in	Collected in	Notes
"Dinah's Hat"	short story	The Atlantic (June 2026)	Uncollected	

== See also ==
- Stephen King bibliography
- Unpublished and uncollected works by Stephen King
