= For the Birds =

For the Birds may refer to:

- For the Birds (film), a 2000 animated short by Disney/Pixar
- For the Birds (The Frames album)
- For the Birds (The Mess Hall album)
- "For the Birds" (short story), a short story by Isaac Asimov
- "For the Birds" (King short story), a short story by Stephen King
- "For the Birds" (Stine short story), a Goosebumps story by R. L. Stine
- "For the Birds", a song by The Julianna Hatfield Three from Become What You Are
- "For the Birds", an episode of Dora and Friends: Into the City!
- For the Birds, 1980 book by American composer John Cage
