= The Killer (short story) =

Short story by Stephen King

- Short story by Stephen King
- Original title: I've Got to Get Away!
- Country: United States
- Language: English
- Genre: Horror short story

Publication
- Published in: Famous Monsters of Filmland
- Publisher: Warren Publishing
- Media type: Print
- Publication date: 1994

Chronology
Jhonathan and the Witches	Blind Willie

"The Killer" is a short story by Stephen King. Written in the early 1960s, it was first published in issue #202 of Famous Monsters of Filmland in spring 1994.

== Plot summary ==
The protagonist of the story awakens in a munitions factory; he is unable to remember his name or anything else. Seizing a gun, he demands that another worker tell him who he is; after the worker ignores him, he clubs him with the gun. After a man on an overhead catwalk flees from the protagonist, he shoots him; the wounded man sounds an alarm. As the protagonist attempts to flee, he is intercepted by men wielding "energy guns"; he shoots one of them before being hit with "energy beams". The story ends with the protagonist being loaded into a truck. A watching man notes that "one of them turns killer every now and then", with another man musing that "they're making these robots too good", revealing that the protagonist was a malfunctioning robot.

== Publication ==
King wrote "The Killer" as a young teenager; it is a rewrite of his story "I've Got to Get Away!", which was self-published as part of the collection People, Places and Things in 1960. King submitted "The Killer" (as Steve King) to Forrest J Ackerman for the magazine Spacemen; it was the first story he submitted for publication. While not accepted at the time, the story was later published in issue #202 of Famous Monsters of Filmland in spring 1994 with an introduction by Ackerman. It has never been collected. The reprint came about after Ackerman paid a visit to King's house and read him the story; after King failed to guess the author, Ackerman revealed that King himself had written the story.

== Reception ==
Rocky Wood describes "The Killer" as "derivative of pulp fiction" but "fairly well written for a probably 13 or 14 year old". Stephen Spignesi describes the story as "an early example of King's frequent motif of out-of-control technology", comparing it to works such as "Trucks", "The Mangler", and "Obits". Spignesi also states that, "in tone and technique it comes across as something that was probably written a short time after that eclectic potpourri of juvenilia". Reflecting on the story, King wrote "I was still in the Ro-Man phase of my development, and this particular tale undoubtedly owed a great deal to the killer ape with the goldfish bowl on his head."

== See also ==
- Stephen King short fiction bibliography
