= Carrie (novel) =

1974 horror novel by Stephen King

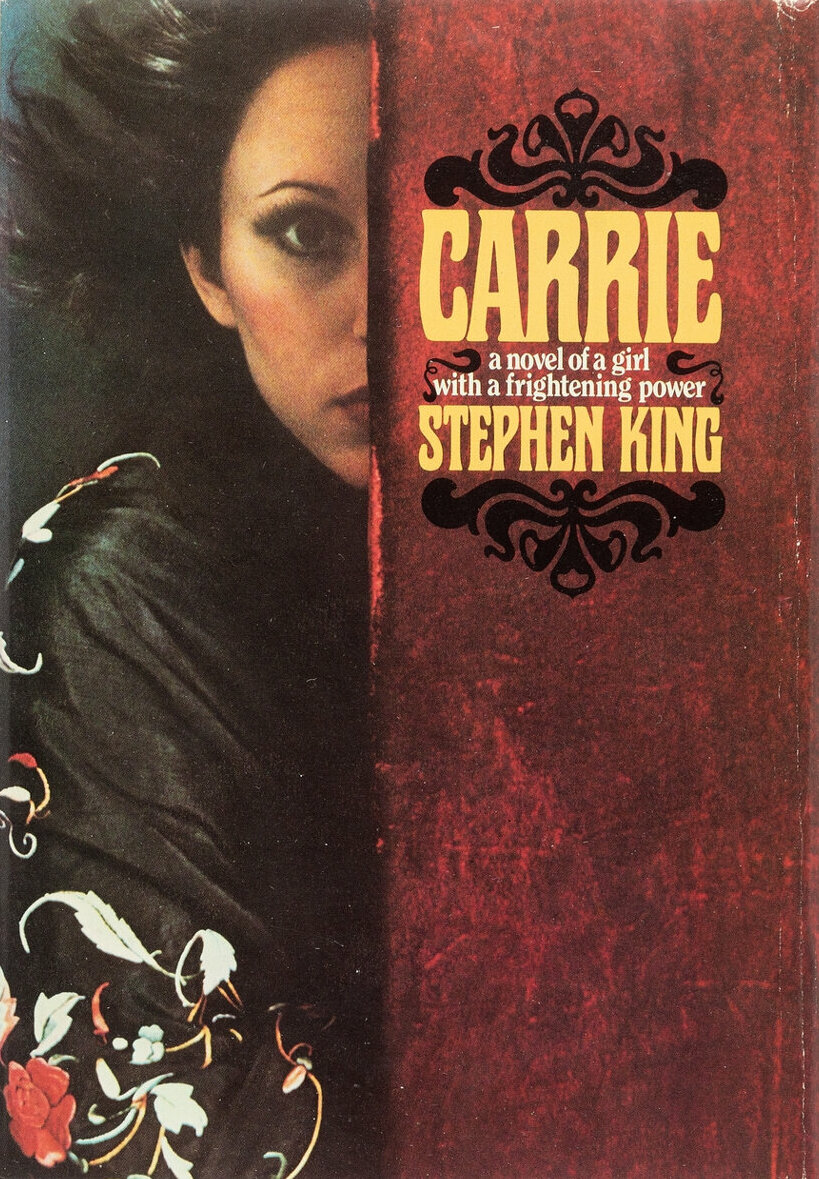
- First-edition cover
- Author: Stephen King
- Language: English
- Genre: Horror, Gothic
- Publisher: Doubleday
- Publication date: April 5, 1974
- Publication place: United States
- Media type: Print (hardcover)
- Pages: 199
- ISBN: 978-0-385-08695-0
- OCLC: 678598194

Carrie is the debut horror novel by American author Stephen King, released in 1974. Set in the town of Chamberlain, Maine, the plot revolves around Carrie White, a friendless high school girl from an abusive religious household who has telekinetic powers. After a cruel prank pulled by one of her bullies on prom night, Carrie decides to take revenge.

King wrote Carrie with the intention of submitting it to be published originally as a short story for the men's magazine Cavalier following the suggestion of a friend that he write a story about a female character. Though King initially gave up on Carrie due to discomfort and apathy, and felt it would never be successful, his wife Tabitha persuaded him to continue writing, and rescued the first three pages of the story from the trash. He followed her advice and expanded it into a novel. King based the character of Carrie on two girls he knew in high school and enjoyed fabricating the documents for the narrative. After Doubleday accepted Carrie for publication, King worked with editor Bill Thompson to revise the novel.

Carrie was published on April 5, 1974, with a print run of 30,000 copies, and a paperback edition was published by New American Library in April 1975. The paperback edition became a best seller, particularly after the release of the 1976 film adaptation, reaching four million sales. The novel received generally positive reviews, both contemporaneously and retrospectively. Carrie, King's debut novel, helped launch his career and achieve mainstream success for him. It has also been credited with reviving mainstream interest in horror fiction and being influential among contemporary horror writers. Three film adaptations have been released, with one getting a sequel, while a musical adaptation premiered in 1988, and a television series in 2026.

== Plot ==
In 1979, Carietta "Carrie" White, a 16-year-old girl in Chamberlain, Maine, is ridiculed for her weight, her clothes, and the unusual religious beliefs instilled by her fanatical mother Margaret. One day while showering after physical education class, Carrie has her first period. As Margaret has never taught her about menstruation, Carrie panics, believing she is bleeding to death. Her classmates, led by a popular girl named Chris Hargensen, mock her and throw tampons and sanitary napkins at Carrie, who is hysterical. The gym teacher, Rita Desjardin, intervenes and attempts to comfort Carrie before sending her home for the day.

While walking home, Carrie unconsciously uses telekinesis to push a taunting child from his bicycle. Realizing what she has done, Carrie recalls childhood incidents in which other unusual events occurred, including a time when stones fell from the sky as a response to abuse from her mother. Carrie wonders if she can make such things happen at will. Arriving home, Carrie tells her mother that her period has started and blames Margaret for never explaining menstruation to her. Margaret believes that Carrie's sinfulness caused her to begin menstruating and locks her in a closet as punishment.

The next day, Desjardin reprimands the girls who bullied Carrie and gives them a week's detention. Chris refuses to comply and is punished with suspension and exclusion from the prom. After her influential father fails to reinstate her, Chris decides to take revenge on Carrie. Another girl involved in the incident, Sue Snell, asks her boyfriend, Tommy, to invite Carrie to the prom as a way to atone for the locker-room bullying. Carrie is suspicious at first, but accepts. Learning that Carrie will be attending prom, Chris persuades her boyfriend Billy and his gang of greasers to gather pig's blood while she prepares to rig the prom queen election in Carrie's favor. Her plan is to humiliate Carrie in front of the whole school by rigging buckets of blood to fall on her during the coronation of prom queen. Carrie begins preparing for prom night, all while secretly learning to control her telekinetic powers. Margaret realizes that her daughter has inherited the same telekinetic abilities Margaret's grandmother possessed and attributes them to witchcraft, but is initially too frightened to address the issue directly. Instead, she begs Carrie not to attend the prom, considering it an occasion of sin. Carrie uses her powers to thwart Margaret's attempts to stop her.

At prom, Carrie finds herself accepted by her peers for the first time and loses some of her self-consciousness as she interacts with them. Tommy finds himself curiously drawn to Carrie and realizes he is falling in love with her. Surprised to see her name on the ballots for Prom King and Queen, Carrie has a premonition that she should not vote for herself, but Tommy convinces her that she deserves to win. Carrie and Tommy are elected prom queen and king by a single vote. At the moment of the coronation, Chris, who is hiding in the wings, releases the buckets, covering Carrie in blood. Tommy is hit by a falling bucket and knocked unconscious. In shock, Carrie flees the building amid the other students' laughter, unaware that many of them are reacting in horror.

Outside, Carrie grows angry and decides to use her powers to humiliate them, as they had humiliated her. She seals the gym and activates the sprinkler system, inadvertently sparking some ungrounded wires that electrocute several of her classmates. The wiring sparks a fire that eventually ignites the school's fuel tanks, destroying the building in a massive explosion. Only a few staff and students, including Desjardin, narrowly escape. Tommy dies in the blaze, having never regained consciousness. Realizing what she has done, Carrie's sanity snaps. She begins to make her way home, causing destruction as she goes. She opens a gas main, resulting in explosions that level Chamberlain's downtown, then tears down live electrical lines that kill those who have left their homes to investigate. Her powers cause many townsfolk, including Sue, to instinctively sense Carrie's presence as she approaches. Sue leaves her home to find Carrie, hoping to stop her.

Carrie returns home to kill Margaret, who in turn lies in wait to murder Carrie. Margaret rambles about the night of Carrie's conception, a sin she believes is the root of Carrie's evil. She stabs Carrie with a kitchen knife, but Carrie uses her powers to stop Margaret's heart. Mortally wounded, Carrie makes her way to the roadhouse, where she sees Chris and Billy leaving town. After Billy attempts to run over Carrie, she takes control of his car and sends it into a wall, killing both him and Chris. Following Carrie's psychic signal, Sue finds the dying Carrie in the roadhouse parking lot. Carrie believes Sue set up the prank at the prom. Sue invites Carrie to search her mind via telepathy, and Carrie sees that Sue wished her no ill will. Sue, still tethered to Carrie's mind, experiences Carrie's final moments before death.

The incident in Chamberlain, labeled the "Black Prom", makes national news with 440 reported casualties, including the majority of the graduating seniors. The rest of the town, unable to recover financially or emotionally from the tragedy, begins to shut down, with many survivors relocating. Desjardin and the school's principal blame themselves for not reaching out to Carrie sooner and resign from teaching. A congressional commission investigates the Black Prom to discover what truly happened, concluding they must prepare for future incidents. Sue Snell is scapegoated and blamed for triggering Carrie. In response, she writes a memoir recounting her experience and expressing sympathy for Carrie, while haunted by the memory of Carrie's death.

The novel ends with a letter from an Appalachian woman to her sister about her four-year-old daughter, who has begun to exhibit telekinetic powers. She compares the child to her grandmother, who also possessed these powers, and concludes that the child is destined to be even more powerful.

== Style and themes ==
Carrie is a horror novel as well as an example of supernatural and Gothic fiction. It is in part an epistolary novel: the narrative is organized around a framing device consisting of multiple narrators, and a collection of reports and excerpts in approximate chronological order. It has been argued that this structure is used to indicate that no particular viewpoint, scientific or otherwise, can explain Carrie and the prom night event.

Carrie deals with themes of ostracism, bullying, coming-of-age and the consequences of not conforming to societal norms. A driving force of the novel is Carrie's first period in the shower. Following the massacre, Sue is subject to the same exclusion as Carrie, despite her altruistic motives. John Kerrigan and Victoria Madden have both observed that throughout the novel, Carrie is often associated with pigs, which are considered "disgusting" animals.

Another theme is vengeance. Kerrigan considers Carrie to be an example of a revenge tragedy. Ray B. Browne argues that the novel serves as a "revenge fantasy", while novelist Charles L. Grant has stated that "[Stephen] King uses the evil/victim device for terror". Some scholars have argued that Carrie is a social commentary. Linda J. Holland-Toll has stated that "Carrie is about disaffirmation because society makes the human monster, cannot control the monster, yet still denies the possibility of actual monster existence while simultaneously defining humans as monsters".

== Background ==
By the time of writing Carrie, Stephen King lived in a trailer in Hermon, Maine with his wife Tabitha and two children. He had a job teaching English at Hampden Academy, and wrote short stories for men's magazines such as Cavalier. Carrie was originally a short story intended for Cavalier. King had started conceptualizing the story after a friend suggested writing a story about a female character. Before writing Carrie, King already had five unpublished novels completed, including The Long Walk.

The basis of the story was King imagining a scene of a girl menstruating for the first time in the shower similar to the opening scene of the film Carrie and an article from Life about telekinesis. As he wrote the opening shower scene, King experienced discomfort due to not being female and not knowing how he would react to the scene if he were female. He also felt apathy toward Carrie when writing the scene. After three pages, King eventually threw away the manuscript of the story. The next day, Tabitha retrieved the pages from the trash and convinced King to continue writing the story with input from her. King was ultimately able to emotionally connect to Carrie through the influence of two girls he knew. One was constantly abused at school due to her family's poverty forcing her to wear only one outfit to school. The other was a timid girl from a devoutly religious family.

King believed Carrie would not be successful, thinking it would not be marketable in any genre or to any audience. He also found writing it to be a "waste of time" and found no point in sending out what he perceived as a failed story. King only continued writing it in order to please his wife and because he was unable to think of anything else to write. When he finished the first draft, Carrie was a 98-page-long novella that he detested. In December 1972, King decided to rewrite Carrie and strive for it to become novel-length. He wrote in fabricated documents that were purported to be from periodicals such as Esquire and Reader's Digest, imitating their style accordingly, a process that King found entertaining. After Carrie was accepted by the publisher Doubleday, King revised the novel with editor and friend Bill Thompson. The original ending of Carrie had Carrie growing demon horns and destroying an airplane thousands of feet above her. Thompson convinced King to rewrite the ending to be more subtle.

== Publication ==
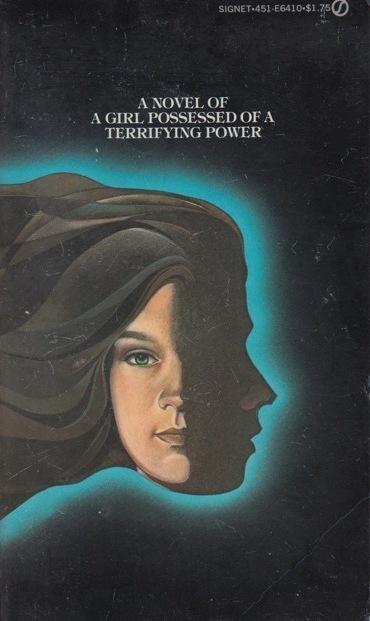
The cover for the 1975 paperback edition of Carrie does not feature the title or the author's name.

King's manuscript for Carrie was given to editor Bill Thompson in November 1973. Seeing potential in the novel, Thompson convinced Lee Barker, executive editor of Doubleday, to accept it. In 1973, after much revision, advanced copies of Carrie were sent to salespeople to secure an advance. Eventually, the novel was approved for an advance of $1,500. Thompson convinced Doubleday to boost the advance to $2,500, moderately high for an American debut novel at the time, and it was announced to King via telegram. With a print run of 30,000 copies, the hardback edition of Carrie was published on April 5, 1974. Although Carrie was marketed as an "occult" novel, trade reviewers called it a horror novel, unusual for the time.

On May 3, 1974, Carrie was received by the publishing company New English Library and was read overnight by president Bob Tanner. He sent a copy to the parent company, New American Library, which then offered Doubleday $400,000 for rights to mass-market paperback publication of Carrie, of which King received $200,000. New English Library published Carrie in May 1974, and New American Library published the book under its Signet Books imprint in April 1975. With the goal of persuading the reader to buy the book, New American Library designed the novel to be "double-covered". The original cover of the paperback edition did not feature the title or the author's name; it consisted of the face of a girl in front of a silhouette. Behind the cover was a two-page picture of New England on fire, with the title and author's name on the far right. New American Library planned for the girl's silhouette to be scored to allow the reader to see the burning New England picture. The printers refused to produce the technique, and the edition was published without the scoring. Since initial publication, Carrie has remained in continual print and has been published throughout Europe. On March 26, 2024, British publishing company Hodder & Stoughton published the 50th anniversary edition of Carrie, which included a new introduction by Margaret Atwood.

== Reception ==
The hardback edition of Carrie sold modestly; it was not an instant best seller. Sources of the number of sales for the hardback edition vary, ranging from 13,000 copies to 17,000 copies. In contrast, the paperback edition sold well. In its first year, the edition sold one million copies. The sales were bolstered by the 1976 film adaptation, totaling four million sales. In 1976 Carrie became a New York Times best seller, debuting on the list in December and remaining on it for 14 weeks, peaking at number 3.

Carrie received generally positive reviews and has become a fan favorite. Several critics considered it an impressive literary debut. Harold C. Schonberg, writing as Newgate Callendar for The New York Times, stated that despite being a debut novel, "King writes with the kind of surety normally associated only with veteran writers". The Daily Times-Advocate's Ina Bonds called Carrie an "admirable achievement" for a first novel, and Kirkus Reviews wrote that "King handles his first novel with considerable accomplishment and very little hokum". Bob Cormier from the Daily Sentinel & Leominster Enterprise wrote that the novel could have failed because of the subject matter, but did not, and thus found King to be "no ordinary writer".

Various critics wrote that the plot will scare readers, with Library Journal declaring the novel "a terrifying treat for both horror and parapsychology fans". Mary Schedl of The San Francisco Examiner wrote that Carrie "goes far beyond the usual limitations of the [horror] genre" to deliver a message about humanity. Publishers Weekly praised the novel for its sympathetic portrayal of Carrie. Both Joy Antos of Progress Bulletin and Gary Bogart of Wilson Library Journal wrote of enjoying Carrie despite the foregone conclusion. Nonetheless, Booklist stated that reading the novel required a "willing suspension of disbelief and taste".

Retrospectively, Carrie has received appraisal. Michael R. Collings and Adam Nevill declared that the plot holds up decades after publication. Collings attributed it to focus and conciseness, and Nevill attributed it to the characterization and structure. In his literary analysis, Rocky Wood called the plot "remarkably short but compelling". Michael Berry of Common Sense Media lauded the characterization and said that the epistolary structure "lend[s] a sense of realism to the outlandish proceedings". While both Grady Hendrix and James Smythe similarly praised the story, Hendrix felt that the writing was awkward much of the time, and Smythe found the epistolary-style extracts to be the "worst [and slowest] parts of the novel". Although Harold Bloom found the characterization and style to be unremarkable, he thought the novel had strong imagery and said that "Carrie at the prom scene ... is a marvelous culmination of popular melodrama."

== Legacy ==
Carrie launched King's career as an author; the $200,000 King received when Carrie was accepted for mass-market publication allowed him to quit his job as a teacher and become a full-time author. The novel established him as a horror writer who wrote about "the supernatural, the dark, and the bizarre". Following Carrie's publication, King underwent a six-month period of prolific writing. During this period, he wrote rough drafts for Blaze and 'Salem's Lot, the latter of which became his second published novel, being published in 1975. Both Carrie and its 1976 film adaptation brought King into the mainstream, and he has since become one of the most successful authors in the modern era, with his novels consistently becoming best sellers.

For decades prior to the 1970s, horror literature had not been in the mainstream; Carrie is credited as one of four novels to create a contemporary mainstream interest in horror literature. (Note: The other three novels are Rosemary's Baby (1967), The Exorcist (1971), and The Other (1971).) This interest was especially bolstered by the subsequent adaptation. Carrie has been influential among contemporary writers, with writers such as Sarah Pinborough, James Smythe, and Sarah Lotz stating they had been influenced by Carrie. Joanne Harris refers to her 2023 novel, Broken Light, as "an homage to Carrie". The prom scene when Carrie is covered in pig blood has been referenced in pop culture, with examples including Monsters University, My Little Pony comics, and horror media such as It Follows, Buffy the Vampire Slayer, and Treehouse of Horror. Author Jeff VanderMeer said of Carrie's influence:

Carrie changed the paradigm by announcing a very American form of horror that broke with the past. That process might've been ongoing anyway, but a lot of horror and weird fiction was still in a kind of post-MR James/Lovecraft mode of parchment and shadowy alleys and half-seen horrors, and here was King dropping buckets of blood over everything and making characterisation both more relaxed and more contemporary. But just as sophisticated, if more naturalistic, less stylised.

Carrie has received three film adaptations, a musical adaptation, and a television series. The first film adaptation, directed by Brian De Palma and starring Sissy Spacek in the title role, was released on November 3, 1976, to critical acclaim and commercial success, and is considered a noteworthy example of 1970s horror films and a major contributing factor to King's success. A sequel to the 1976 film adaptation titled The Rage: Carrie 2 was released in 1999 to mixed reviews. From May 12 to 15, 1988, a musical adaptation was performed five times by the Royal Shakespeare Company at the Virginia Theater before closing. It was a commercial and critical failure, losing more than $7 million, among the most expensive failures by Broadway theatre. A 2002 television film adaptation received negative reviews, and a 2013 film adaptation received mixed reviews. An off-Broadway revival of the musical was performed from March 1 to April 8, 2012. The television series Riverdale aired an episode titled "Chapter Thirty-One: A Night to Remember" in 2018 based on the musical. In 2024, Mike Flanagan was announced to be helming a television adaptation of the novel with Amazon MGM Studios. The series premiered on October 7, 2026 on Amazon Prime Video.

== See also ==
- The Fury, a 1976 novel with a similar premise and its 1978 film adaptation, also directed by De Palma
- Jennifer, a 1978 film with a similar premise

== Sources ==
- Barron, Neil, ed. (June 1999). Fantasy and Horror: A Critical and Historical Guide to Literature, Illustration, Film, TV, Radio, and the Internet. Scarecrow Press. ISBN 978-0-81083-596-2.
- Beahm, George (September 1998). Stephen King From A to Z: An Encyclopedia of His Life and Work. Andrews McMeel Publishing. ISBN 978-0-83626-914-7.
- Beahm, George (October 6, 2015). The Stephen King Companion: Four Decades of Fear from the Master of Horror. St. Martin's Press. ISBN 978-1-25008-131-5.
- Bloom, Harold, ed. (2007). Stephen King. Chelsea House Publishers. ISBN 978-0-79109-317-7.
- Browne, Ray Broadus (1987). The Gothic World of Stephen King: Landscape of Nightmares. Bowling Green State University Popular Press. ISBN 978-0-87972-411-5.
- Collings, Michael R. (1996). The Work of Stephen King: An Annotated Bibliography & Guide. Borgo Press. ISBN 978-0-80951-520-2.
- Cowan, Douglas E. (June 12, 2018). America's Dark Theologian: The Religious Imagination of Stephen King. New York University Press. ISBN 978-1-47981-446-6.
- Gresh, Lois H.; Weinberg, Robert (August 31, 2007). The Science of Stephen King: From Carrie to Cell, The Terrifying Truth Behind the Horror Master's Fiction. Wiley. ISBN 978-0-47178-247-6.
- Holland-Toll, Linda J. (June 15, 2001). As American as Mom, Baseball, and Apple Pie: Constructing Community in Contemporary American Horror Fiction. University of Wisconsin Press. ISBN 978-0-87972-852-6.
- Ingebretsen, Edward J. (May 6, 1996). Maps of Heaven, Maps of Hell: Religious Terror as Memory from the Puritans to Stephen King. M.E. Sharpe. ISBN 978-0-76563-623-2.
- Kerrigan, John (April 18, 1996). Revenge Tragedy: Aeschylus to Armageddon. Clarendon Press. doi:10.1093/acprof:oso/9780198184515.001.0001. ISBN 978-0-19818-451-5. Archived from the original on September 4, 2021.
- King, Stephen (2000). On Writing: A Memoir of the Craft. Scribner. ISBN 978-1-43919-363-1.
- Lant, Kathleen Margaret; Thompson, Theresa, eds. (1998). Imagining The Worst: Stephen King and the Representation of Women. Greenwood Press. ISBN 978-0-31330-232-9.
- Marshall, Helen (May 2020). "A Snapshot of an Age: The Publication History of Carrie". The Journal of Popular Culture. 53 (2): 284–302. doi:10.1111/jpcu.12897. S2CID 218941970. Archived from the original on November 25, 2021.
- Underwood, Tim; Miller, Chuck, eds. (1985). Fear Itself: The Horror Fiction of Stephen King. New American Library. ISBN 978-0-45200-684-3.
- Underwood, Tim; Miller, Chuck, eds. (1986). Kingdom of Fear: The World of Stephen King. New American Library. ISBN 978-0-45116-635-7.
- Reino, Joseph (1988). Stephen King: The First Decade, Carrie to Pet Sematary. Boston Public Library. ISBN 978-0-80577-512-9.
- Winter, Douglas E. (1989). The Art of Darkness: The Life and Fiction of the Master of the Macabre, Stephen King. New English Library. ISBN 978-0-45049-475-8.
- Wood, Rocky (April 11, 2011). Stephen King: A Literary Companion. McFarland & Company. ISBN 978-0-78648-546-8.
