= The Blue Air Compressor =

1971 short story by Stephen King

- Short story by Stephen King
- Country: United States
- Language: English
- Genre: Horror short story

Publication
- Published in: Onan, Heavy Metal
- Publication type: Magazine
- Media type: Print, audio
- Publication date: January 1971

Chronology
"Silence"	"In the Key Chords of Dawn"

"The Blue Air Compressor" is a short story by Stephen King, first published in January 1971 in Onan.

== Plot summary ==
Gerald Nately is a young writer who writes a short story about his friend's wife, Mrs. Leighton (the couple's first names are not given). Mrs. Leighton is an enormously obese woman, so Nately calls his short story "The Hog." Mrs. Leighton finds the story and mocks it, saying she was too big for him to write about, so he shoves the nozzle of an air compressor into her mouth and overinflates her, causing her to explode. Her remains are buried under the tool shed, and Nately flees to the Near East after retitling his story "The Blue Air Compressor." Nately's crime is never discovered, and eventually he decapitates himself with a guillotine (after writing several dark, misunderstood novels, essays, short stories, and poems).

== Publication ==
"The Blue Air Compressor" was first published in Onan, a literary magazine of the University of Maine at Orono, in January 1971, shortly after King had graduated. A "heavily revised" version was reprinted in the magazine Heavy Metal in July 1981. In 2018, it was anthologized for the first time in Shining in the Dark, edited by Hans-Åke Lilja. King stated that the story was partially inspired by an EC Comics story ("Family Mixup", from issue #15 of The Thing!, published July-August 1954) and by the works of Edgar Allan Poe.

== Adaptations ==
An audio adaptation of "The Blue Air Compressor" (narrated by King himself) was released in 2020 as part of the audio adaptation of Shining in the Dark.

== Reception ==
Rocky Wood describes "The Blue Air Compressor" as "one of King's stranger stories, and far from his best" and as "not of high quality, pretentious...self-admittedly derivative and quite unrepresentative of King's style (even at the time it was written)". James Van Hise describes "The Blue Air Compressor" as "one very strange story". Stephen J. Spignesi describes it as "a strange, experimental story". George Beahm characterises it as "a one-note revenge tale".

Michael R. Collings cites "The Blue Air Compressor" as an example of King's "vision [...] expanding, incorporating not only his own observations and interests but also tags of literary heritage as well." Collings describes the air compressor from the story as an example of King's "fascination with the deadly effects of 'machines'", noting that "King links a machine more tightly to an image of horror; again, however, human manipulation initiates the action".

== See also ==
- Stephen King short fiction bibliography
