= The New Lieutenant's Rap =

- Short story by Stephen King
- Country: United States
- Language: English

Publication
- Publication type: Chapbook
- Publisher: Philtrum Press
- Media type: Print
- Publication date: 1999

Chronology
The Little Sisters of Eluria	The Road Virus Heads North

"The New Lieutenant's Rap" is a short story by Stephen King. It was originally published as a limited run chapbook by Philtrum Press in 1999 and was later reworked into "Why We're in Vietnam", a short story appearing in King's 1999 book Hearts in Atlantis.

== Plot summary ==
The story, set in summer 1999, opens with two American veterans of the Vietnam War, Dieffenbaker and John Sullivan, conversing after the funeral of Dick Pagano, another veteran whom they had served with. Sullivan recalls an incident in Đông Hà when Dieffenbaker, his commanding officer, had ordered him to kill another soldier, Clemson, to prevent him from massacring Vietnamese civilians. After Sullivan asks Dieffenbaker "Why were we in Vietnam to begin with?", Dieffenbaker - who has grown immensely cynical and bitter following his experiences in Vietnam - opines that their generation "had achieved little of value" and postulates that the two men are still in Vietnam - with their memories of events that have happened since the product of "a pot-bubble" - and that Vietnam is the preferable of the two competing realities. The story ends with Sullivan agreeing, thinking "We stay because it's better."

== Publication ==
"The New Lieutenant's Rap" was originally published by Philtrum Press (King's own imprint) in chapbook format, with 500 numbered copies being printed. The text of the chapbooks was in King' handwriting. The chapbooks, which were autographed by King, were gifted to attendees at a party held to celebrate the 25th anniversary of the publishing of King's debut novel Carrie that was held at Tavern on the Green in New York City. It has never been sold commercially. A "substantially revised" version of "The New Lieutenant's Rap", retitled "Why We're in Vietnam", was published in King's book Hearts in Atlantis later that year.

== Reception ==
Rocky Wood states, "It is as great a pleasure to read a story in King's handwriting as it is to listen to his audio recordings."

== See also ==
- Stephen King short fiction bibliography
- "Why We're in Vietnam"
