= Squad D =

- Short story by Stephen King
- Country: United States
- Language: English
- Genre: Horror

Publication
- Published in: Shivers VIII
- Media type: Print (Paperback)
- Publication date: April 18, 2019

"Squad D" is the title of a short story by American writer Stephen King. Originally written in the late-1970s, the story was rejected by Harlan Ellison, who thought it needed work; the anthology The Last Dangerous Visions for which it was intended was not published until 2024.

The story was finally published in the anthology Shivers VIII, edited by Richard Chizmar and published by Chizmar's Cemetery Dance Publications on April 18, 2019.

== Plot ==
Josh Bortman is the only surviving member of "Squad D". He was in the hospital for hemorrhoids on the day that the other nine members ran afoul of a trap laid by the Viet Cong. Torn apart by guilt, Bortman sends a photo he shot to every family of the victims; it shows the squad, his best and only friends. Three years later, Dale Clewson – father of the late Squad D soldier, Billy – desperately tries to get in touch with Josh, because Josh now can be seen in the photo. When he reaches Josh's father, he finds out that Josh committed suicide and was hence able to rejoin his friends on the picture.

== Themes ==
The story includes themes and images to which King would return in later works, including survivor's guilt ("The Things They Left Behind"), the idea of changing pictures ("Stationary Bike" and Duma Key), and the U.S.'s involvement in Vietnam ("The New Lieutenant's Rap", "The Old Dude's Ticker", Hearts in Atlantis).
