= The Dark Man (poem) =

2013 poem written by Stephen King

The Dark Man: An Illustrated Poem
- Cover to the first edition
- Author: Stephen King
- Illustrator: Glenn Chadbourne
- Cover artist: Glenn Chadbourne
- Language: English
- Genre: Horror
- Publisher: Cemetery Dance Publications
- Publication date: July 30, 2013
- Publication place: United States
- Media type: Print (Hardcover)
- Pages: 88
- ISBN: 978-1587674211

"The Dark Man" is an early poem written by Stephen King when he was in college. It was later published in Ubris in 1969. It served as the genesis for the character of Randall Flagg. An edition from Cemetery Dance Publications with illustrations from Glenn Chadbourne was released in July 2013. The poem also appears within the body of King's essay "Five to One, One in Five" as featured in the 2016 book Hearts in Suspension.

== Synopsis ==
The poem follows an unnamed 'dark man' who rides the rails observing everything around him. The poem takes a sinister turn when the narrator confesses to rape.

== Genesis ==
Stephen King wrote the poem on the back of a placemat in a college restaurant. According to King, the idea for the poem came out of nowhere: "this guy in cowboy boots who moved around on the roads, mostly hitchhiking at night, always wore jeans and a denim jacket... The thing about him that really attracted me was the idea of the villain as somebody who was always on the outside looking in and hated people who had good fellowship and good conversation and friends." This mysterious dark man was eventually built into Randall Flagg, a primary antagonist in many of King's books, starting with The Stand.

== Publication ==
The poem was initially published in the literary magazines Ubris in 1969 and Moth in 1970. In 2004, Cemetery Dance reprinted it in The Devil's Wine, a hardcover collection of poems. In 2013, they announced an illustrated version of the poem with illustrations by Glenn Chadbourne. It was included in Monster Verse, a 2014 collection from the Everyman's Library.

== See also ==
- Stephen King short fiction bibliography
