= The Furnace (short story) =

Short story by Stephen King

- Short story by Stephen King et al
- Country: United States
- Language: English
- Genre: Horror short story

Publication
- Published in: Know Your World Extra
- Publisher: Weekly Reader
- Media type: Print
- Publication date: September 2005 - October 2007

"The Furnace" is a short story authored in instalments by Stephen King and 28 other writers as a piece of collaborative fiction. King's opening was originally published in 2005 in the educational magazine Know Your World Extra.

== Plot summary ==
The text of "The Furnace" authored by King comprises the first two paragraphs of a story, with the reader invited to complete the story. King's opening concerns a 10-year-old boy, Tommy, who must retrieve firewood from a cellar while fearing a creature he believes is behind the furnace.

Tommy's job was to get wood for the fire from the box at the bottom of the cellar stairs. His mother said he wouldn't be afraid of the cellar when he got older, but now he was ten, and he hated it more than ever.

Tommy was sure something was behind the furnace. He sometimes thought he could hear it breathing back there, and he knew it was watching him. Then one day when Tommy was getting the wood, the door at the top of the stairs swung shut and the cellar light went out.

— Stephen King, "The Furnace"

A completed version of the story, authored by King and 28 other writers, was published on the Weekly Reader website in October 2007.

== Publication ==
The two opening paragraphs of "The Furnace" were donated by King in an attempt to encourage young people to develop an interest in writing. They were published in volume 32, issue 2 of Know Your World Extra on 23 September 2005 as a feature titled "Write Your Own Scary Story". Readers were invited to submit instalments to complete the story themselves in a serial fashion. The title was not supplied by King.

By October 2005, "hundreds" of students had submitted entries. The final story, made up of King's opening paragraphs and contributions from 28 students, was published on the Weekly Reader website in October 2007. Students taking part whose entries were accepted received a copy of the Weekly Reader magazine signed by King, a copy of The World Almanac, and a Weekly Reader t-shirt.

"The Furnace" has never been completed by King himself, or collected.

== Reception ==
Rocky Wood describes King's text as "scant but scary". Ira Wolfman, the Senior Vice-president of Editorial for Weekly Reader, described King's opening as "wonderfully creepy".

== See also ==
- Stephen King short fiction bibliography
