= Night Surf =

- Short story by Stephen King
- Country: United States
- Language: English
- Genres: Post-apocalyptic, horror, short story

Publication
- Published in: Ubris; Night Shift
- Publisher: Doubleday
- Media type: Print (Hardcover)
- Publication date: 1969

"Night Surf" is a post-apocalyptic short story by Stephen King, first published in the spring 1969 issue of Ubris. In 1978 it was collected in King's book Night Shift.

== Plot summary ==
On an August night on Anson Beach, New Hampshire, a group of former college students has survived a plague caused by a virus called A6, or "Captain Trips". They believe the virus spread out of Southeast Asia and wiped out most of humanity.

The characters' outlook is grim. They encounter a delirious man dying of the plague and burn him alive on a pyre as a half-serious black magic human sacrifice. The protagonist, Bernie, reflects upon this new world and reminisces about "the time before" when he went to Anson Beach in his youth, years before the plague. All the members of Bernie's group had survived a virus called A2, which supposedly made them immune to A6. But Needles tells Bernie he has contracted A6. Bernie admits to himself that, deep down, they know A2 doesn't guarantee protection against A6 and that they will probably all be dead by Christmas. Bernie's girlfriend keeps up the pretense, accepting Bernie's explanation that Needles must have lied about having A2 so the others would not leave him behind.

== Publication ==
"Night Surf" was first published in the spring 1969 issue of Ubris magazine. A heavily revised version was published in the August 1974 issue of Cavalier magazine. In 1978, the story was collected in King's first book of short stories, Night Shift. At eight pages long, it is one of King's shortest short stories.

== Adaptations ==
Writer-director Peter Sullivan adapted "Night Surf" as a short film, produced in 2002. Optioned from King for a dollar, the film is part of the Dollar Baby collection of similar short films.

== See also ==
- Stephen King short fiction bibliography
- The Stand
