= Man With a Belly =

Short story by Stephen King

- Short story by Stephen King
- Country: United States
- Language: English
- Genre: Crime short story

Publication
- Published in: Cavalier
- Publisher: Fawcett Publications
- Media type: Print
- Publication date: 1978

Chronology
The Gunslinger	The Crate

"Man With a Belly" is a short story by Stephen King. It was published in Cavalier in December 1978.

== Plot summary ==
The story opens with John Bracken, a hitman, in the James Memorial Park of an unnamed town; he is waiting for Norma Correzente, who is due to walk home from a casino through the park at 11:00 PM. Bracken has been paid $50,000 (equivalent to $247,000 in 2025) by Norma's husband, the 78 year-old Mafia Don Vittorio "Vito the Wop" Correzente, to rape her as punishment for her compulsive gambling. Correzente considers that ordering this deed will show him to be "a man with a belly". (Note: "A man with a belly" is a Sicilian idiom for a Mafia chief. Michael R. Collings and David Engebretson interpret the phrase as referring to "a proud, willful man".)

After a violent struggle, Bracken rapes Norma in the park, then passes on Correzente's message that he now considers "that all debts are paid and there is honor again". Norma subsequently persuades Bracken to escort her to her secret second apartment, where they have consensual sex. Afterwards, Norma sets out her hatred of Correzente. The following day, Norma offers Bracken $100,000 (equivalent to $494,000 in 2025) of her own money to impregnate her so she can trick Correzente into believing she is giving him an heir, leaving her free to gamble (and enabling her to "kill him with the truth" in the future). Bracken agrees to the deal, and 10 weeks later Norma tests positive on a pregnancy test.

Seven months later, Correzente's consigliore Benito "Benny the Bull" Torreos summons Bracken to Correzente, who is dying and wishes to ask Bracken a question. Torreos informs Bracken that Norma has died in childbirth. Knowing that he will be hunted down if he refuses, Bracken visits Correzente, who informs him that he suffered a stroke while attempting to impregnate Norma, then later suffered a second, larger, stroke while arguing with her. Norma in turn injured herself while running to summon help, leading to her own death during labour. Correzente expresses suspicion that the baby - which is in an incubator - has blue eyes, despite both he and Norma having brown eyes. Bracken rejects the implication that he is the father, saying "I have my own belly. Do you think I would take my own leavings?" and that the baby's eyes will turn brown, though Correzente will not live to see it.

== Publication ==
One of a series of stories that King submitted to "low rent" men's magazines during the 1970s both as a means of earning extra money and to get his name in print, "Man With a Belly" was originally published in Cavalier in December 1978. It was later published in the November/December 1979 issues of Gent. Writing in 1998, Stephen J. Spignesi described "Man With a Belly" as one of King's "lost works", stating that finding a copy would be "extremely difficult" as the story "has only appeared in print twice and neither of the men's magazines where it was published (the raunchy journals Cavalier and Gent) are archived in libraries". Writing in 2014, Michael A. Perry and Patrick McAleer also described "Man With a Belly" as one of King's "lost works". In 2017, "Man With a Belly" was to be included in the crime anthology Killer Crimes edited by Richard Chizmar and Brian James Freeman. However, as of November 2025, Killer Crimes had yet to be published. As of 2022, "Man With a Belly" had not been collected in a book by King, or adapted.

== Reception ==
Rocky Wood considers that the story "has some plot holes and is somewhat unsatisfying" but felt that "all three main characters are conceptually interesting and the storyline bold". Tyson Blue considers the story to lack "King's trademark characteristics of good storytelling and characterization". James Van Hise states that the story "takes some odd turns [...] but crumbles into pointlessness at the end. If it's supposed to be a character study of the cold-blooded, heartless hitman, it just doesn't gel." Patrick McAleer suggests that the story "serves as an example of [King's] critical eye on social and cultural norms".

Stephen J. Spignesi notes "Man With a Belly" as an example of King's "forays into the 'crime story' genre". Michael R. Collings describes "Man With a Belly" as "a tale of murder and revenge, with over-tones of gangster society that foreshadows Thinner's Ginelli".

== See also ==
- Stephen King short fiction bibliography
