= The Night of the Tiger =

Short story by Stephen King

- Short story by Stephen King
- Country: United States
- Language: English
- Genre: Horror short story

Publication
- Published in: The Magazine of Fantasy & Science Fiction
- Publisher: Spilogale, Inc.
- Media type: Print
- Publication date: 1978

Chronology
| The Woman in the Room | Nona |

"The Night of the Tiger" is a short story by Stephen King. Originally written in the 1960s, it was first published in The Magazine of Fantasy & Science Fiction in February 1978.

== Plot summary ==
The story is narrated by Eddie Johnston of Sauk City, who impulsively joins Farnum & Williams' All-American 3-Ring Circus and Side Show as a roustabout. Johnston enjoys circus life, but fears Mr. Indrasil, the fiery tempered lion tamer, who is rumored to have only nearly killed a roustabout who angered him. Mr. Indrasil in turn fears the circus' tiger, Green Terror, who once attacked him, leaving a scar on the back of his neck.

One night in Steubenville, Mr. Indrasil berates Johnston for not cleaning a cage properly. After Johnston protests, Mr. Indrasil attempts to hit him, but is stopped by a stranger, Mr. Legere. Later, other members of the circus tell Johnston that Mr. Legere has followed the circus from the Midwest to Little Rock nearly every year for the past two decades, and that he shares an unknown past with Mr. Indrasil. Mr Legere attends every performance by the circus, always standing next to Green Terror's cage.

During the following days, the circus experiences a heat wave, heightening tensions. On one night, Johnston witnesses Mr. Indrasil baiting Green Terror by jabbing him with a pike until being frightened away by a mysterious green-eyed shadow.

Events reach a climax in Wildwood Green, Oklahoma. Mr. Indrasil's act goes poorly after Green Terror roars at an inopportune time, resulting in one of the lions attempting to attack Mr. Indrasil. The evening performance is cancelled after the United States Weather Bureau issues a tornado warning. Johnston struggles to put Green Terror in his wagon; after he approaches Mr. Indrasil for help, a drunken and crazed Mr. Indrasil threatens him, saying he has no "juju" or "grisgris" to protect him, then begins rambling about his "nemesis", who he claims turned Green Terror against him and who "always had the power more'n me". After Green Terror begins roaring, Mr. Indrasil approaches the tiger's cage, where he is confronted by Mr. Legere. Mr. Legere releases Green Terror from his cage, and both men seemingly attempt to command the tiger using their willpower. Mr. Legere ultimately prevails; as the tiger advances on Mr. Indrasil, Johnston sees him fold-in on himself. As Johnston watches, he is lifted off his feet by the tornado and knocked unconscious.

When Johnston awakens, he learns that there is no sign of Mr. Indrasil or Mr. Legere, but Green Terror and another unknown tiger have fought one another to death. Johnston is told by a witness to the fight that the second tiger had a long scar on the back of its neck, implying it was a shapeshifted Mr. Indrasil.

== Publication ==
King wrote "The Night of the Tiger" in 1963 at the age of 16, being inspired by an episode of The Fugitive. He submitted the story to The Magazine of Fantasy & Science Fiction and received a handwritten rejection note saying "This is good. Not for us, but good. You have talent. Submit again." In the 1970s, King found "The Night of the Tiger" in a box of manuscripts, rewrote it, and resubmitted it; this time, the story was accepted. "The Night of the Tiger" was first published in The Magazine of Fantasy & Science Fiction in February 1978. It was reprinted in the anthologies More Tales of Unknown Horror (1979), The Year's Best Horror Stories VII (1979), The Third Book of Unknown Tales of Horror (1980), Chamber of Horrors (1984), The Best Horror Stories from the Magazine of Fantasy & Science Fiction (1988), Horrorstory, Volume Three (1992), Tails of Wonder and Imagination (2010), and Midnight Under the Big Top (2020).

== Reception ==
Tyson Blue described "The Night of the Tiger" as "enjoyable" but noted "the ultimately unsatisfying nature of the story, with its plethora of unresolved loose ends and plot inconsistencies." James Van Hise judged it to be "one of King's lesser stories although it contains some interesting ideas". Michael R. Collings remarked that "the story is too allusive" and that "too much is missing". Rocky Wood described the story as "unsatisfying and inconclusive". Introducing the story in Tails of Wonder and Imagination, Ellen Datlow suggested that the story "has a Ray Bradbury feel to it, but with a harder edge." Revisiting the story, King himself judged it to be "a perfectly respectable tale, albeit one obviously written by a guy who had only begun to learn his chops".

== See also ==
- Stephen King short fiction bibliography
