= Here There Be Tygers (1968 short story) =

- Short story by Stephen King
- Country: United States
- Language: English
- Genres: Horror, Short story

Publication
- Published in: Ubris
- Publisher: University of Maine
- Media type: Print (literary journal)
- Publication date: 1968

"Here There Be Tygers" is a horror short story by Stephen King. It was originally published in the spring 1968 issue of Ubris magazine, and collected in King's Skeleton Crew in 1985.

This story follows a third-grader who discovers a tiger lurking in his school bathroom. Written by King when he was in high school, the story is one of his first published works. Literary critics noted the presence of social determinism and hints of surrealism in the story, while others saw neither deep meaning nor symbolism in the work. In 2010, the story was adapted into a short film.

== Plot ==
During class, third-grader Charles needs to use the bathroom. His teacher, Miss Bird, humiliates him by publicly asking whether he needs to urinate and allows him to leave. As he enters the bathroom and looks around the corner, Charles sees a tiger lying on the floor. He stands at the door, too afraid to enter. Eventually, a child named Kenny Griffen approaches him. Charles warns him about the danger, but he does not believe him and goes into the toilet. Charles expects screams, but hears nothing. When he re-enters the room, he finds Kenny’s torn shirt. Charles decides to relieve himself in the sink, and Miss Bird finds him doing it. Charles tells the teacher not to enter the bathroom, but Miss Bird doesn't listen and goes around the corner to find Kenny. Charles returns to class, leaving Miss Bird with the tiger.

== Publication ==
As Stephen King noted in the foreword to Skeleton Crew, this is one of the first stories King ever wrote. It was written when King was a high school student.

The title references the phrases used by medieval cartographers when they put warnings on unexplored portions of their maps. The phrase was also used in King's later story "The Reploids." In the film version of King's novel The Dark Half, the story Thad's mother looks at is a copy of this story.

== Adaptation ==
On October 31, 2024, an animated short film based on the short story, titled Lily premiered, directed and narrated by Kate Siegel with music by The Newton Brothers and designed and animated by Pete Scalzitti. The short changes the names of the characters Charles and Miss Bird to Robert and Miss Sidley, respectively. It removes the character Kenny Griffin, but includes a female student named Rhoda. Additionally, the tiger is given the name Lily due to the name around her collar.

== See also ==
- Stephen King short fiction bibliography
- Here There Be Tygers by Ray Bradbury
