= Edward D. Ives =

- Born: September 4, 1925; White Plains, New York, United States
- Died: August 1, 2009 (aged 83); Orono, Maine, United States
- Other names: Sandy Ives
- Education: Ph.D. Indiana University
- Occupation: Professor/Director of Folklore (retired)
- Employer: University of Maine
- Known for: Studies of folksongs and oral literature

Edward Dawson (Sandy) Ives (September 4, 1925 – August 1, 2009) was an American folklorist. His work concentrated on the oral traditions of Maine and the Maritime Provinces of Canada, particularly, as he said, "on local songs and their makers but also on cycles of tales about local heroes." He founded the Maine Folklife Center in 1992 and was its director until his retirement in 1998.

== Biography ==
He grew up in White Plains, New York, served in the Marines, studied literature in college and, beginning in 1955, taught English at the University of Maine. In 1962, he obtained a Ph.D. in folklore from Indiana University and in 1964, he became a professor of folklore at the University of Maine. Ives taught in the English and Anthropology Departments of the University of Maine for over forty years.

One of Ives's most famous students was Stephen King. Ives was one of the dedicatees of King's novel Hearts in Suspension.

He performed as a folk singer to supplement his income as a lecturer. This introduced him to the lumber camp singing tradition of Maine, New Brunswick and Prince Edward Island and he soon found his calling. In 1957, he organized the Northeast Archives of Folklore and Oral History at the University of Maine. The next year, he founded the Northeast Folklore Society and began editing the monograph series Northeast Folklore. His Folkways Records album, Folk Songs of Maine, was released in 1959.

For more than forty years, Ives continued to explore the northeastern oral tradition, publishing his findings with some regularity. Several of his books focus on individual subjects, whose names found their way into the titles of his books. This personalized approach permitted him to offer a deep exploration of the material, the subject, and himself. A reviewer has commented: "His books on Gorman, Scott, and Doyle... are personal accounts of discovery, as much as studies of regional and occupational singing traditions. Ives’s focus on the singers who gave him texts and on his own adventures in the field have made his studies models of contextual and reflexive scholarship."

In his work in New Brunswick, he was closely associated with folksong collector and radio broadcaster Louise Manny.

== Bibliography ==
- Larry Gorman: The Man Who Made the Songs. Bloomington: Indiana University Press, 1964. Reprinted New York: Arno Press, 1977. Reprinted Fredericton, N.B.: Goose Lane Editions, 1993.
- Folksongs and Their Makers. (co-editor) Bowling Green, Ohio, 1970
- Lawrence Doyle: The Farmer-Poet of Prince Edward Island. Orono: University of Maine Press, 1971 (Maine Studies No. 92).
- Joe Scott: The Woodsman Songmaker. Champaign: University of Illinois Press, 1978.
- The Tape-Recorded Interview: A Manual for Field Workers in Folklore and Oral History. 1980, updated 1995
- George Magoon and the Down East Game War. Champaign: University of Illinois Press, 1988. Reprinted (paperback) 1993.
- Folksongs of New Brunswick. Fredericton: Goose Lane Edition, 1989
- The Bonny Earl of Murray: The Man, The Murder, The Ballad. Urbana: University of Illinois Press, 1997
- Drive Dull Care Away: Folksongs from Prince Edward Island. Charlottetown: Institute of Island Studies, 1999.
- MacDougall, Pauleena and David Taylor. Northeast Folklore: Essays in Honor of Edward D. Ives. Orono, Maine: University of Maine Press and the Maine Folklife Center 2000.

== Honors ==
- Honorary LL.D., University of Prince Edward Island (1986)
- Kenneth Goldstein Lifetime Achievement Award in Academic Leadership, American Folklore Society (1992)
- Elected into Fellows of the American Folklore Society (honorary organization) (1980)
- Harvey A. Kantor Memorial Award for Outstanding Achievement in Oral History in (1979)
- Marius Barbeau Medal from the Canadian Folklore Studies Association for outstanding lifetime contributions to the field of folklore (1991).
- Award of Honour, Prince Edward Island Museum and Heritage Foundation (1998)
- Guggenheim fellowship
- In 2007, six of his interviews from 1958 were named to the National Recording Registry.
