= Ur (novella) =

Digital novella by Stephen King

- Cover of the original Kindle release
- Author: Stephen King
- Language: English
- Genre: Science fiction
- Published in: Amazon Kindle
- Publisher: Amazon.com
- Publication date: February 12, 2009
- Publication place: United States
- Media type: E-book

Ur is a science fantasy novella by Stephen King. It is one of King's few short stories that is not an example of the horror genre. It was written exclusively for the Amazon Kindle platform, and became available for download on February 12, 2009. An audiobook edition was released on February 16, 2010 by Simon & Schuster Audio, read by Holter Graham. Ur was collected in King's 2015 collection The Bazaar of Bad Dreams, heavily revised.

== Original release ==
King said, speaking about Ur:

The delivery mechanism to my mind is secondary for me as a writer. [...] But I did this once before with a story called Riding the Bullet and I never had so many guys in suits come up to me and ask me questions. But they didn't want to know about the story, they didn't want to know about the process, they wanted to know about the delivery system, but to me that's secondary. [...] I think people will be more interested in the business aspect of [Ur] than they will in the story. I would never have agreed to it if I didn't think it was a pretty good story. I decided I would like to write a story for the Kindle, but only if I could do one about the Kindle. Gadgets fascinate me, particularly if I can think of a way they might get weird. I had previously written about homicidal cars, sinister computers, and brain-destroying mobile phones; at the time the Amazon request came in, I'd been playing with an idea about a guy who starts getting e-mails from the dead. The story I wrote, Ur, was about an e-reader that can access books and newspapers from alternate worlds. I realized I might get trashed in some of the literary blogs, where I would be accused of shilling for Jeff Bezos & Co., but that didn't bother me much; in my career, I have been trashed by experts, and I'm still standing.

King's agent, Ralph Vicinanza, stated that downloads of the novella at Amazon.com had reached "five figures" in about three weeks, while also denying the novella is an infomercial for the Kindle. King's publisher, Scribner, released Ur as an audiobook on February 16, 2010. In an interview in October 2010, King stated that he did not write the novella for the money: "I did it because it was interesting. I'm fairly prolific. It took three days, and I've made about $80,000. You can't get that for short fiction from Playboy or anybody else. It's ridiculous."

== Plot ==
Wesley Smith, an English teacher at a Kentucky college and book aficionado, buys a Kindle following an argument with his girlfriend. Due to a minor mistake in his credit card number, he is sent a pink Kindle (even though at the time, Kindles were always white). Slowly, he realizes that this edition was meant for another Wesley Smith from a parallel universe.

Smith's Kindle has a peculiar function called UR that can search multiple timelines for data. Interestingly enough, each time he uses this function, an enormous dark tower flashes across the screen as it loads data. Smith finds four books Ernest Hemingway wrote in an alternate universe where he lived for three more years. Further searches reveal written works by Edgar Allan Poe and William Shakespeare from other timelines. Wesley also discovers yet another function concerning newspapers that were published in an alternate universe.

Smith tells a friend and a student about the Kindle. The three men try to connect to an issue of The New York Times from an alternate reality but find to their horror that no papers are published on the day they requested. They learn that in this alternate reality, the world ended when the Cuban Missile Crisis escalated into World War III in November 1962.

Smith also discovers that a busload of local students, as well as his own girlfriend, will be killed by a drunk driver in fewer than three days. With help he tracks down the drunk driver and prevents her from causing the accident.

When he returns home, Smith finds that Low Men in Yellow Coats are waiting for him, ready to punish him for using the forbidden function of the Kindle. He argues that perhaps this change was meant to happen—how could he have gotten the Kindle otherwise? His argument does not fully sway the Low Men, but they feel it best to simply keep it from happening again by confiscating the Kindle, leaving Smith to ponder the vastness of a world he thought he understood. Soon afterward, Smith learns his girlfriend loves him after all.

== See also ==
- Short fiction by Stephen King
