= The Old Dude's Ticker =

News from Stephen King

- Short story by Stephen King
- Country: United States
- Language: English
- Genre: Horror short story

Publication
- Published in: Necon XX 2000: Twentieth Anniversary Commemorative Volume
- Publication type: Book
- Publisher: Necon Committee
- Media type: Print
- Publication date: 2000

Chronology
"Riding the Bullet"	"All That You Love Will Be Carried Away"

"The Old Dude's Ticker" is a short story by American writer Stephen King. Written in the 1970s, it was not published until 2000. It is an homage to Edgar Allan Poe's "The Tell-Tale Heart", adapted to take place in the Vietnam War era and incorporating the slang of the time.

== Plot summary ==
Richard Drogan, a veteran of the Vietnam War, lives with an elderly man referred to only as the "Old Dude". The Old Dude has a cataract in one eye that frightens the narrator, so much so that he plans to murder the old man. After several nights of watching the Old Dude sleep by shining a pen-light through his door, he illuminates the old man's diseased eye, which is open. The Old Dude had been awake for some time, and the narrator speculates that he was very afraid and trying to calm himself down. Seeing the eye, however, drives Drogan into a rage.

The narrator claims to have very sensitive hearing from his military service, and smothers the old man for fear of the neighbors hearing the man's heartbeat. He dismembers the body and conceals the parts beneath the floorboards.

The police arrive the following morning; a neighbor summoned them after hearing a yell in the night. Drogan invites them in, but soon hears a rhythmic thudding sound that he believes to be the Old Dude's beating heart. Convinced that the police can hear it as well, he confesses to the crime.

In a paragraph at the end, we are told that the preceding story had been a statement taken from Drogan in 1976 during the course of the investigation. It is revealed that Richard Drogan is actually an alias for Robert S. Deisenhoff, an escapee from the Quigly Veterans Hospital (where he had been committed after fragging an officer in Vietnam).

== Publication ==
"The Old Dude's Ticker" was written by Stephen King in the early-1970s when King was a self-described "unknown, unagented scribbler". It was one of several stories he submitted to men's magazines as a meaning of supplementing his income, most of which were published in Cavalier. "The Old Dude's Ticker" failed to sell, and was filed away by King; it was later retrieved from a collection of King's manuscripts held in the Raymond H. Fogler Library at the University of Maine. It was published for the first time in 2000 in the Necon XX 2000: Twentieth Anniversary Commemorative Volume, a limited print run collection edited by Bob Booth. In 2009, it was reprinted in The Big Book of Necon, also edited by Bob Booth. In 2017, it was reprinted in the anthology work Dark Screams: Volume Six edited by Brian James Freeman and Richard Chizmar.

"The Old Dude's Ticker" is essentially an adaptation of Edgar Allan Poe's "The Tell-Tale Heart" set during the Vietnam War era. King variously describes the story as "satire", "affectionate homage", "pastiche", and "a crazed revisionist telling". It was one of two stories rejected by the magazines King pitched it to; the other was "The Spear", a modern-day retelling of a story by Nikolai Gogol, which has since been lost.

== Reception ==
Rocky Wood describes "The Old Dude's Ticker" as "a fun story, to be appreciated as much for its intent as its content" and states "Poe's style does come through in the story and it is certainly [an] excellent homage to The Tell-Tale Heart", while noting that "the slang is very dated". Brian Jarvis cites the story as an example of King's "passion for the genre [that] is underscored by explicit dedications and allusions to favourite authors and in particular Poe, Lovecraft and Jackson". Writing in The Edgar Allan Poe Review, John Gruesser states "Reading Poe’s and King’s stories together helps to highlight the mastery of the former because of the ways in which the latter diverges from it, namely King's dubious decisions not only to include period slang, copious (and graphic) profanity, and contemporary references but also to provide specific details about his murderous central character and to close the narrative frame with a two-and-a-half-line epilogue".

== See also ==
- Stephen King short fiction bibliography
- The Tell-Tale Heart
