= The Slow Mutants =

1981 short story by Stephen King

- Author: Stephen King
- Language: English
- Series: The Dark Tower
- Genre: Fantasy
- Published in: The Magazine of Fantasy and Science Fiction
- Publisher: Mercury Press
- Publication date: July 1981
- Publication place: United States
- Media type: Print (Magazine)
- Preceded by: The Oracle and the Mountains
- Followed by: The Gunslinger and the Dark Man

The Slow Mutants is a fantasy novella by American writer Stephen King, originally published in The Magazine of Fantasy and Science Fiction in July 1981. In 1982, "The Slow Mutants" was collected with four other stories King published in The Magazine of Fantasy and Science Fiction as The Dark Tower: The Gunslinger. "The Slow Mutants" formed the fourth chapter of the book, and was slightly revised for the inclusion.

== Plot ==
Roland and Jake make their way through a railway tunnel using a hand car cart created by the Great Old Ones. During this time, to distract the boy, Roland tells him a story of his childhood (which is also told in Wizard and Glass and The Gunslinger Born).

At age fourteen, Roland discovered his mother having an affair with his father's court magician, Marten Broadcloak. Marten taunted Roland in order to spur him into an early trial to prove his worth as a gunslinger, hoping that he would fail and be sent into exile, therefore ending potential trouble for the Good Man and Crimson King to whom Marten secretly swore allegiance. Roland faced his teacher Cort, using his hawk David as his weapon and deliberately sacrificing him in order to gain the upper hand, and passed the trial.

While traveling through the mountain, Roland and Jake are attacked by a pack of slow mutants, who block the track in an attempt to catch them. Jake clears the obstruction just in time for them to escape, and they travel on to the edge of a deep chasm spanned by a dilapidated trestle. They abandon the hand car and start crossing on foot. Nearing the other end, Jake slips and Roland catches him, but the man in black arrives to offer Roland a choice: let the boy die or never catch him. Roland lets Jake fall to his death and exits the tunnel with the man in black.

== See also ==
- Short fiction by Stephen King
