= For the Birds (King short story) =

Short story by Stephen King

- Short story by Stephen King
- Country: United States
- Language: English
- Genre: Short story

Publication
- Published in: Bred Any Good Rooks Lately?
- Publisher: Doubleday
- Media type: Print
- Publication date: 1986

Chronology
Paranoid: A Chant	The End of the Whole Mess

"For the Birds" is a short story by Stephen King. It was originally published in 1986 as part of the short story collection Bred Any Good Rooks Lately?.

== Plot summary ==
"For the Birds" is a one-page "science fiction joke". The story takes place in 1995, where pollution has resulted in the rooks that live in London dying off. Concerned that this will impact on tourism, the City of London Corporation looks to source replacement rooks from a place with a similar climate until the pollution problem can be resolved. The Council appoints an ornithologist and sends him to Bangor, Maine where he begins incubating rooks. Impatient to see progress, the Council sends the ornithologist a daily telegram reading "Bred any good rooks lately?"

== Publication ==
"For the Birds" was originally published in 1986 as part of Bred Any Good Rooks Lately?, a collection of "shaggy dog tales" edited by Jim Laurel. The punchline of King's story (a pun/malapropism based on the phrase "read any good books lately?") was borrowed as the title of the collection. "For the Birds" is an idiom meaning "stupid or not important".

== Reception ==
Rocky Wood describes "For the Birds" as "very casual" in tone. Stephen J. Spignesi describes it as "very short (and very funny)".

== See also ==
- Stephen King short fiction bibliography
