= For the Birds (short story) =

- Short story by Isaac Asimov
- Country: United States
- Language: English
- Genre: Science fiction

Publication
- Published in: Asimov's Science Fiction
- Publication type: Periodical
- Publisher: Davis Publications
- Media type: Print (Magazine, Hardback & Paperback))
- Publication date: May 1980

Chronology
- Series: Space Habitats
—	To Tell at a Glance

"For the Birds" is a science fiction short story by American writer Isaac Asimov. The editor of a proposed fashion magazine wanted a science fiction story about a clothing designer. Asimov agreed, and wrote the story in November 1978. It was accepted, but the proposed magazine never appeared, and Asimov sold the story to Asimov's Science Fiction. "For the Birds" was published in the May 1980 issue of Asimov's, and was reprinted in the 1983 collection The Winds of Change and Other Stories. The story was one of three Asimov wrote in the late 1970s set among a series of O'Neill-type space habitats.

== Plot summary ==
Charles Modine is a fashion designer who has been hired by a company called Space Structures, Ltd. to design wings for use in space habitats. The habitats have only recently been built, and Space Structures is having trouble attracting immigrants; they hope that the prospect of flight will attract more permanent residents. Also, if the residents take up flying on a regular basis, the regular exercise they receive will eliminate the need to keep the habitat spinning rapidly, with its attendant unpleasant Coriolis effect. Modine travels up to Space Settlement Five, where he learns that the habitat's engineers have already designed a set of wings. Unfortunately, they are difficult to master; it will be Modine's job to redesign the wings in some way that will make it easier (or at least more attractive) to fly. Modine decides to design a set of wings for himself. After a week's work, he gives a demonstration for the habitat's administrators, and it is a success. Modine realized that in the low-gravity region near the habitat's axis, the movement of fish through water would be a better model than the movement of birds through the air, so he designed flying gear with fins and flippers. "Wings," he points out, "are for the birds."
