= Paranoid: A Chant =

Poem by Stephen King

- Short story by Stephen King
- Country: United States
- Language: English
- Genre: Poetry

Publication
- Published in: Skeleton Crew
- Publication type: Anthology
- Publisher: Signet Books
- Media type: Print (Paperback)
- Publication date: 1985

"Paranoid: A Chant" is a 100-line poem by Stephen King originally published in the 1985 short story collection Skeleton Crew.

== Synopsis ==
The poem is a first-person narrative from the diary of a person with paranoid schizophrenia, the character complains of persecution from "the old woman in the room above" who "has put an electric suction cup on the floor..." "the waitress says it was salt, but I know arsenic when it's put before me..." and many more horrors. When he is served food with mustard he thinks it is "to mask the bitter odor of almonds," presumably a reference to cyanide. According to the poem, the victim has amassed "500 notebooks with 500 pages in each one" and records all the wrongs done unto him in the books. He thinks that his enemies are part of a massive government conspiracy and mentions the FBI and the CIA. He is also superstitious; he knows chants and he wears charms.

The poem is recursive, ending where it begins, with the stanza "I can't go out no more. There's a man by the door in a raincoat"

The poem also has ties to the Dark Tower epic. When King originally began writing The Stand, he wrote "A dark man with no face." This became the description for Randall Flagg and is an exact line from the poem.

== Film, television or theatrical adaptations ==
The poem was adapted into an eight-minute Dollar Baby short film by Jay Holben, starring Tonya Ivey, in 2000.

== See also ==
- Stephen King short fiction bibliography
