= A Face in the Crowd (novella) =

Short story by Stephen King and Stewart O'Nan

- Short story by Stephen King; Stewart O'Nan
- Cover of the original e-book release
- Language: English
- Genre: Horror

Publication
- Publication type: E-book
- Publisher: Simon & Schuster Digital
- Publication date: August 21, 2012
- Publication place: United States

A Face in the Crowd is a novella by Stephen King and Stewart O'Nan, originally published as an e-book on August 21, 2012, as well as an audiobook, read by Craig Wasson. A hardcover edition was published in July 2023 in an omnibus edition, paired with Richard Chizmar's The Longest December.

== Background information ==
Stephen King and Stewart O'Nan had previously collaborated in 2004 on a non-fiction book Faithful, chronicling the 2004 Boston Red Sox season. In Faithful, during a discussion about watching baseball on television, King posits an idea for a story entitled "Spectators", which later evolved into A Face in the Crowd:

Then there's the Face Game. I play this by keeping an eye on the faces of spectators behind home plate. [...] And last night—remember, I never lost the thread of the game during this, that's the beauty of baseball—I had this wonderful idea for a story. What if a guy watches a lot of baseball games on TV, maybe because he's a shut-in or an invalid (or maybe because he's doing a book on the subject, poor schmuck), and one night he sees his best friend from childhood, who was killed in a car crash, sitting in one of the seats behind the backstop? Yow! And the kid is still ten! He never claps or cheers (never picks his nose or talks on his cell phone, for that matter), just sits there and watches the game... or maybe he's watching the main character of the story, right through the TV. After that the protagonist sees him every night at every game, sometimes at Fenway, sometimes at Camden Yards, sometimes at the CreepyDome up in Toronto, but every time there are more people the poor freaked-out guy knew, sitting all around him: this guy's dead friends and relatives, all sitting in the background at the ballpark. I could call the story "Spectators." I think it's a very nasty little idea.

Later, when speaking and reading an excerpt from his work in progress novel Doctor Sleep at the Savannah Book Festival, in Savannah, Georgia on February 19, 2012, King mentioned the same idea again. After describing the gist of it, King said he did not know how the story ended, so he told the audience, "I'm gonna give this story to you, you guys write it." Incidentally, Stewart O'Nan was in the audience.

== See also ==
- Stephen King short fiction bibliography
