= Hearts in Suspension =

Non-fiction book by Stephen King

- First edition cover
- Author: Stephen King
- Language: English
- Publisher: University of Maine Press
- Publication date: November 7, 2016
- Publication place: United States
- Media type: Print (Hardcover)
- Pages: 373
- ISBN: 978-0-89101-127-9

Hearts in Suspension is a 2016 non-fiction book by Stephen King, edited by Jim Bishop. The book focuses on King's time as a student at the University of Maine.

== Contents ==
The book features a new essay by King entitled "Five to One, One in Five," four installments of "King's Garbage Truck" (a column King wrote for UMaine's student newspaper), a reprint of King's novella Hearts in Atlantis, which is set on the campus in 1966, twelve essays from "fellow students and friends from King's college days," and "a gallery of period photographs and documents." The book was edited by Jim Bishop, a former English instructor at the University of Maine who taught King.
