= Jhonathan and the Witchs =

Short story by Stephen King

- Short story by Stephen King
- Country: United States
- Language: English
- Genre: Fairy tale

Publication
- Published in: First Words: Earliest Writings from Favorite Contemporary Authors
- Publication type: Anthology
- Publisher: Algonquin Books
- Media type: Print
- Publication date: 1993

"Jhonathan and the Witchs" is a fairy tale by Stephen King. Written in 1956-1957, it was first published in 1993 as part of the anthology First Words: Earliest Writings from Favorite Contemporary Authors. It is the earliest work of King still known to exist.

== Plot summary ==
Jhonathan [sic], the "smart, handsome, and very brave" son of a cobbler, is urged by his father to seek his fortune. While travelling to see the king to ask for work, Jhonathan saves a fairy disguised as a rabbit from hunters; in return, the fairy grants him three wishes. Upon arriving at the kingdom, the king charges Jhonathan with killing three witches living on a nearby mountain; if Jhonathan succeeds within 20 days, he will be given 5,000 crowns, but if he fails, he will be beheaded.

While travelling to the mountain, Jhonathan considers wishing for a knife, but the fairy whispers to him that the first witch cannot be pierced, the second witch cannot be pierced or smothered, and the third witch cannot be pierced or smothered and is invisible. Encountering the first witch in a cave at the foot of the mountain, Jhonathan wishes for her to be smothered. Encountering the second witch higher up the mountain, Jhonathan wishes for her to be crushed. Hearing the third witch's footsteps, Jhonathan wishes for her to become a normal woman, then kills her with a rock. The three witches dead, Jhonathan collects his reward and lives "happily ever after".

== Publication ==
"Jhonathan and the Witchs" was handwritten by King in 1956-1957 at the age of nine for his aunt Gert, who paid him a quarter for every story he produced. In 1993, it was published for the first time as part of the anthology First Words: Earliest Writings from Favorite Contemporary Authors, edited by Paul Mandelbaum. It has never been collected in a work by King. It is unclear whether the unusual spelling of "Johnathan" and "witches" in the title is an error or a literary device.

== Reception ==
Rocky Wood describes "Jhonathan and the Witchs" as "a Grimm-like fairy tale" that is "simplistic, clearly written by a juvenile and short" but with "signs of a sophisticated vocabulary and the ability to organize a fairly consistent story." Wood further states "...the young author is able to show some inventive touches".

== See also ==
- Stephen King short fiction bibliography
