= Word Processor of the Gods =

- Short story by Stephen King
- Original title: The Word Processor
- Country: United States
- Language: English
- Genres: Fantasy, short story

Publication
- Published in: Playboy (1st release), Skeleton Crew
- Publication type: Magazine
- Publisher: Playboy Media Corp
- Media type: Print (Periodical)
- Publication date: January 1983

"Word Processor of the Gods" is a short story by American writer Stephen King, first published in the January 1983 issue of Playboy magazine under the title "The Word Processor". It was collected in King's 1985 book Skeleton Crew.

== Plot summary ==
Richard Hagstrom, a middle-aged writer, is disenchanted with his tyrannical wife Lena, his disrespectful teenage son Seth, and his life in general. His teenage nephew Jonathan suddenly dies in a car accident caused by the writer's abusive brother Roger, who was driving drunk. Roger dies in the crash, along with Jonathan's gentle, kind mother, Belinda (who had originally dated Richard before Roger married her). From the boy's effects, the writer is given a word processor, which Jonathan was seemingly in the process of cobbling together from a dozen different sources before he died. When the writer turns it on, the start-up message displays "Happy birthday, Uncle Richard", revealing that it was intended as a birthday gift for the main character. At home, Richard discovers that the processor has the mysterious ability to affect reality, but the electronics in the patchwork machine are brittle and will not function for long.

While in the middle of testing the processor, Richard's son returns home alongside his obnoxious band members. Overhearing his son badmouthing him, Richard deletes him, which retroactively erases his existence. His bandmates are gone, his room is empty, and every trace of him ever living there is gone. When his wife returns home, he finds she is now even fatter than when she left, the result of never having any children. After she verbally abuses him, he deletes her as well.

With the processor now rapidly deteriorating, Richard impulsively rewrites reality, making the nephew his own son, and his sister-in-law his wife, moments before the processor irreparably breaks. He turns around, finding the nephew alive once again, now calling him "Dad".

== Adaptations ==
"Word Processor of the Gods" was adapted for an episode of the Tales from the Darkside TV series, first broadcast November 25, 1984.

== See also ==
- Stephen King short fiction bibliography
