= George Beahm =

American author

George Beahm is an American author best known for the Stephen King Companion which he first published in 1989 and has updated in 1995 and 2015. He has published thirty books on pop culture subjects and including Steve Jobs, Michael Jackson, JK Rowling and Anne Rice and written more literary companions than any other author.
