= Ubris =

Literary Journal published by The University of Maine

Ubris was a literary journal published by the University of Maine. It is most notable for having published a number of Stephen King's stories and poems when he was a student at the university.
