= Raymond H. Fogler Library =

Library at University of Maine, USA

Coordinates: 44°53′58″N 68°40′09″W

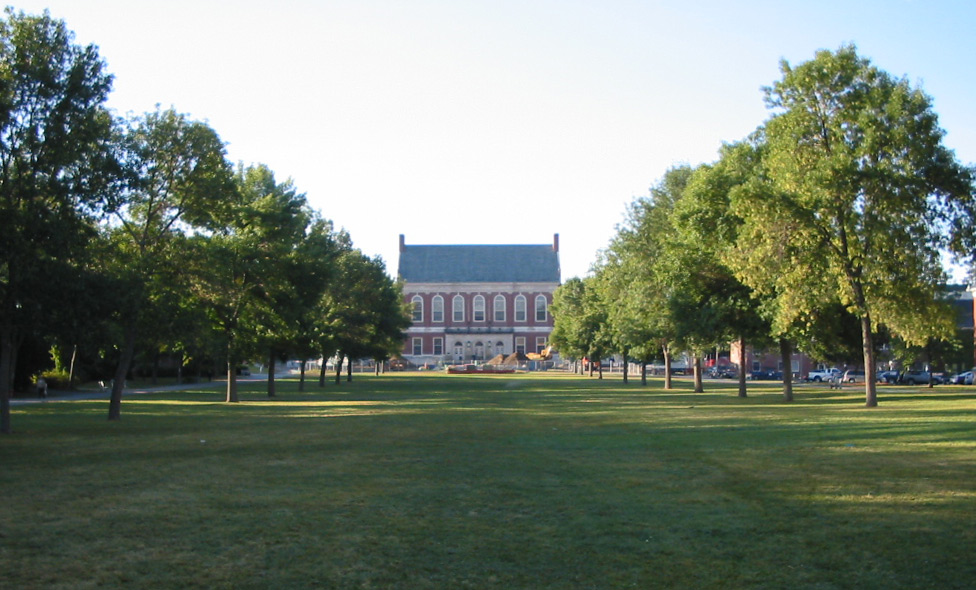
- View of the library from the mall, 2003
- Location: Orono, Maine, United States
- Established: 1947

Access and use
- Population served: University of Maine

Other information
- Website: Raymond H. Fogler Library

The Raymond H. Fogler Library is an academic library at the University of Maine in Orono. The library's collections include approximately more than 1 million volumes, nearly 4 million periodical subscriptions, 1.6 million microforms, 2.2 million United States Federal, Maine State, and Canadian federal and provincial government publications.

== History ==
The library's foundation was laid in 1941, but was not completed until 1947 due to World War II. The architects were William Harold Lee of Philadelphia and Crowell & Lancaster of Bangor. In 1962, it was renamed to honor Maine native, University of Maine alumnus and the final Assistant Secretary of the Navy, Raymond H. Fogler. In the following year, the library became a regional depository site for government documents.

== Special Collections ==
The Fogler Library is a depository for a number of collections, including the multi-generation political families of the Williamsons and the Hamlins. It is also home to the works of journalist Ralph W. 'Bud' Leavitt Jr. and politician William Cohen. It houses significant holdings related to the environment, resource conservation, and related policy, such as the Great Northern Paper Company Records, the Dickey-Lincoln Hydro Project Collection, and the W. Kent Olson Conservation Papers. The library is home to the Sewall Aerial Photographic Collection, containing about 1 million aerial images of Maine and New England that were taken by the James W. Sewall Co. of Old Town. The earliest photographs in the collection date to 1948.

== Magazine ==
The Raymond H. Fogler Library Magazine is a quarterly magazine that covers stories, news, and events from the library.
