= Hearts in Atlantis =

1999 short story collection by Stephen King

- First edition cover
- Author: Stephen King
- Cover artist: Phil Heffernan
- Language: English
- Genre: Horror/Suspense/Drama
- Publisher: Scribner
- Publication date: September 14, 1999
- Publication place: United States
- Media type: Print (hardcover)
- Pages: 528
- ISBN: 978-0-684-85351-2
- Preceded by: Nightmares & Dreamscapes
- Followed by: Everything's Eventual

Hearts in Atlantis (1999) is a collection of two novellas and three short stories by Stephen King, all connected to one another by recurring characters and taking place in roughly chronological order. The stories are loosely autobiographical; in an author's note, King writes that while the places in the book are fictionalized, "Although it is difficult to believe, the sixties are not fictional; they actually happened."

== Stories ==
=== "Low Men in Yellow Coats" ===
In the first and longest work in the book, the year is 1960. A young boy named Bobby Garfield lives in Harwich, Connecticut, with his mother, Liz, a widow. He befriends a man named Ted Brautigan, who possesses psychic abilities. He confesses to Bobby that he is being stalked by "low men" who wear yellow coats and drive garish cars. Although Bobby agrees to let Ted know when he starts seeing "lost pet" signs that indicate that the low men are near, Bobby says nothing when he eventually starts seeing them for fear of losing his friend.

One day, Bobby finds his friend Carol has been beaten by three bullies with a baseball bat and left in a grove of trees. He takes her to his apartment, where Ted has to remove her shirt in order to set her dislocated shoulder. Liz comes home (herself having just been violently raped at a real estate seminar) and assumes that Ted has been molesting Carol. They resolve the misunderstanding, and Liz takes Carol home. Suspecting that his mother has told the low men of Ted's whereabouts, Bobby catches up to Ted just as they are about to take him away. Bobby is given the choice to go with Ted—destination unknown. He decides to stay, but despises himself for his decision.

After leaving Harwich with his mother and twice being put in a juvenile detention facility, Bobby receives an envelope from Ted filled with red rose petals. He knows that Ted is once again free of the low men.

=== "Hearts in Atlantis" ===
The next part of the book, Hearts in Atlantis, takes place in 1966. Peter Riley, a freshman at the University of Maine, gets addicted to playing hearts in the all-male dormitory where he lives. Although their student draft deferments have shielded them from serving in the Vietnam War, Riley and the growing number of students addicted to the game (led by student Ronnie Malenfant, who introduced the game to the dorm) put themselves at risk as their studies suffer.

Peter eventually meets Carol, Bobby Garfield's childhood friend. Carol herself uses student activism as an escapist addiction of her own. Although they fall in love, Carol comes to announce that she will be leaving school. She explains that her decisions are forever influenced by the help that Bobby had given her when they were 11. She and Riley have sex for the first time in his car. The next morning, she leaves a note warning him to stop playing hearts.

When Stokely Jones, a disabled student activist (who specifically asks for a third floor dorm room, in spite of being on crutches), slips and falls in a rainstorm, Riley is disturbed by the strange way he and the other boys laughed at Jones's misfortune. He finds he is shaken from his hearts addiction and resolves to turn his grades around. Shortly afterward, Jones is accused of having sprayed "Fuck Johnson" on a campus wall, with the dormitory floor proctor reasoning that the peace signs accompanying the message lead to Jones. However, Riley and the others point out that they, too, have been toting peace signs, undermining the accusation and saving Jones from punishment.

Riley barely passes his classes and receives a package from Carol containing a newspaper article of a protest she participated in.

=== "Blind Willie" ===
This short story was originally published in the October 1994 issue of Antaeus, and in 1997 was published as part of King's limited edition collection Six Stories. For its inclusion in Hearts in Atlantis, the story was heavily revised.

Willie Shearman is a Vietnam veteran who lives in Connecticut but stands in a particular sidewalk location in downtown New York City each day. He pretends to be blind to solicit money from people passing by, and becomes, temporarily, truly blind every afternoon at the time of day that he was caught in a firefight and temporarily blinded. He believes that his blindness and begging is a form of penance for his involvement in the childhood beating of Carol (from Low Men in Yellow Coats) and each day writes prayers of contrition for his actions in a series of notebooks he keeps. By his estimation, he has written some two million such prayers and expects to continue doing so; he also anonymously donates a portion of the money people give him to various churches. Willie also keeps a scrapbook about her: her involvement in activist groups became increasingly militant under the guidance of a Svengali-like leader named Raymond Fiegler (a name with the initials R.F., suggesting that he is Randall Flagg). The group became responsible for a bombing at a recruiting office, giving Carol the name "Red Carol" (though she may have tried to stop the bomb). Carol was believed killed when their headquarters was raided and the building accidentally set afire.

At the end of the day, Willie's sight returns, signifying it is time to return home to his suburban lifestyle. The story ends just as he gains inspiration for how to deal with the policeman he's been bribing to keep from getting arrested.

=== "Why We're in Vietnam" ===
Two veterans, John Sullivan (another childhood friend of Bobby Garfield's) and a man named Dieffenbaker reunite at the funeral of a third. They revisit an incident that almost escalated into a My Lai-type massacre: stressed by the effort at rescuing survivors of a helicopter crash, Ronnie Malenfant (who first appears as another Hearts player in Hearts in Atlantis) vows to burn a village in Dong Ha as a message to the enemy. After Malenfant stabs a woman with his bayonet and things are spiralling out of control, Dieffenbaker has a soldier shoot dead another rampaging soldier to stop the impending massacre. Later, Sullivan is gravely wounded. When he is airlifted out of combat, he sees the old woman who had been stabbed ("mamasan") sitting in the chopper with him, a hallucination that has continued in perpetuity.

A recurring theme of the conversation between Sullivan and Dieffenbaker is the growing sense between the two men that the various characters of their youths "sold out" in various ways to the allure of materialism and conformity.

During the drive home from the funeral, Sullivan is caught in a traffic jam. Evidently hallucinating, he begins to see things fall from the sky: cordless phones, a grand piano, appliances, and a long yellow coat like the "low men" wear. He is struck by one more object, and picks it up to discover it is Bobby Garfield's Alvin Dark glove. Mamasan, glowing brightly, speaks for the first time, saying she will keep him safe. He abruptly finds himself back in his car. All objects which fell from the sky are gone, except the glove, which Sullivan wears on his hand. Sullivan grows very tired, closes his eyes, and dies of an apparent heart attack.

=== "Heavenly Shades of Night Are Falling" ===
Bobby Garfield returns to Harwich to attend John Sullivan's funeral. He also visits the park where he once came upon Carol Gerber with her arm injured after being beaten by neighborhood boys. In the park, he encounters Carol, alive but scarred and burned. She says that she now goes by the name Denise Schoonover. Bobby reveals that he had come because Sullivan's probate lawyer sent him his old Alvin Dark fielder's mitt with his current address in Ted's handwriting. He then produces what was in the glove: the copyright page from Lord of the Flies, showing that although it came from the 1960 edition, it is still brand new. On it is written a message for Carol from Ted, "Tell her she was as brave as a lion", and the equation she had written for Peter Riley on his copy ("♡ + ☮ = INFORMATION") in "Hearts in Atlantis."

== Reception ==
Charles de Lint praised Hearts in Atlantis as "the Great American Baby Boomer Novel", saying that, "when he's at the top of his form, as he certainly is here, he [King] can be as provocative and inspired as <insert your favorite literary author here>."

== Film adaptation ==
"Low Men in Yellow Coats" and "Heavenly Shades of Night Are Falling" formed the basis of a 2001 film entitled Hearts in Atlantis, starring Anthony Hopkins as Ted Brautigan, Anton Yelchin as Bobby Garfield, Mika Boorem as Carol Gerber and Hope Davis as Liz Garfield. Major story elements are common to the film and the story, but many of the details were changed. In addition, all the references to The Dark Tower were removed and the final destinies of the characters, revealed in the latter stories of the original novel, are excluded. A further consequence of the changes is that the film's title is completely impenetrable to those unfamiliar with the novel, although a snatch of dialogue attempts to remedy this: Ted remarks that childhood is a lost city like Atlantis.

== Connection to King's other works ==
The town of Derry is mentioned several times to be near the University of Maine. Derry is a recurring setting for King's novels and short stories, like It and Insomnia.

'The Regulators' are mentioned, and appear in several stories linked with the Dark Tower universe.

When Ted has 'gone blank' he uses language that occurs often in the Dark Tower universe, as when he says "There will be water if God wills it" and "All things serve the Beam."

When Ted sends Bobby a letter toward the end of the novel, the envelope is filled with red rose petals; the Dark Tower stands in a field of red roses called Cań-Ka No Rey.

Insofar as The Dark Tower series' overall plot is concerned, it is revealed in the seventh book that Ted is essential to the Crimson King's quest to break the beams that hold the Dark Tower up, which in turn holds the universe together.

"Low men" also appear in King's novella Ur, published for Amazon's Kindle in 2009.

One of the bullies who beat Carol, Harry Doolin, shares a surname with minor characters in Wolves of the Calla, Molly and Eamon Doolin, as well as the villain John Doolin (alias Jim Dooley and ZackMcCool) in Lisey's Story.

Raymond Fiegler, who is identified near the novel's end as leader of an activist group when he prevents Carol Gerber from retrieving an unexploded bomb on a college campus, is very likely another alias of Randall Flagg, a recurring villain in many of King's works. King never identifies Fiegler as Flagg, but Christopher Golden and Hank Wagner suggest in The Complete Stephen King Universe that there is little doubt Fiegler is Flagg. Golden and Wagner cite evidence such as Fiegler's ability to make himself appear "dim" (an ability shared by Flagg in The Eyes of the Dragon), his manipulation of Carol Gerber and her activist friends and Flagg's frequent use of aliases (usually with the initials "R.F.").

== See also ==
- List of Stephen King films
- "The New Lieutenant's Rap"
