= Michael R. Collings =

American writer

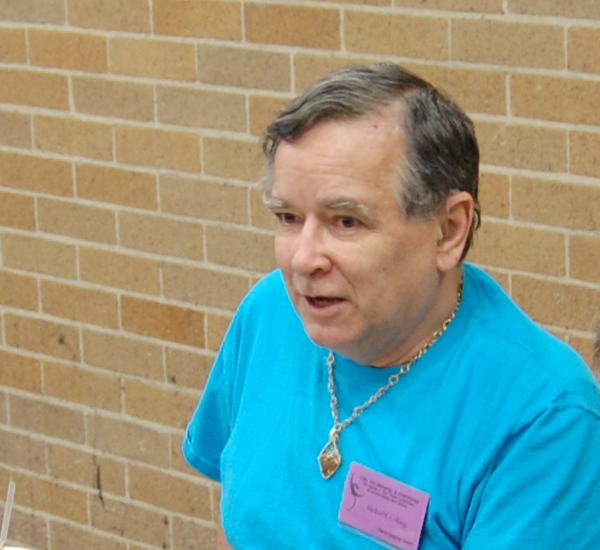
- Collings at Life, the Universe, & Everything, a science fiction and fantasy symposium at Brigham Young University.
- Born: October 29, 1947 (age 78); Rupert, Idaho
- Education: Bakersfield College (AA); Whittier College (BA); University of California, Riverside (MA and PhD)
- Occupations: Writer, bibliographer, literary critic, poet, professor (retired)
- Spouse: Judi Collings
- Children: Michaelbrent Collings
- Writing career
- Language: English
- Period: 1979 - current
- Genres: fantasy, horror, science fiction
- Subjects: Orson Scott Card, Stephen King
- Notable works: In the Image of God: Theme, Characterization and Landscape in the Fiction of Orson Scott Card
- Website: StarShine and Shadows

Michael Robert Collings (born October 29, 1947) is an American writer, poet, literary critic, and bibliographer, and a former professor of creative writing and literature at Pepperdine University. He was Poet in Residence at Pepperdine's Seaver College from 1997 to 2000.

Collings has had multiple collections of his poetry published on subjects such as Latter Day Saint theology, Joseph Smith, Christmas, science fiction, and horror. He is known for his literary critiques and bibliographies of the works of Orson Scott Card and Stephen King, though he has also published critiques and bibliographies of the works of Peter Straub, Dean Koontz, C. S. Lewis, Brian W. Aldiss, and Piers Anthony. His In the Image of God: Theme, Characterization and Landscape in the Fiction of Orson Scott Card was the first book-length academic look at Card's works.

== Biography ==
Michael Robert Collings was born in Rupert, Idaho. He graduated from Bakersfield College in 1967 with an Associate's degree, then graduated with a Bachelor's degree in English from Whittier College two years later. After graduating with a Master's degree in English from the University of California, Riverside in 1973, Collings received his Ph.D. in English literature from UCR in 1977, specializing in Milton and The Renaissance.

Before he began teaching creative writing and literature at Pepperdine University, Collings taught at UCR, San Bernardino Valley Community College, and UCLA. He taught at Pepperdine from 1979 until 2010, when he retired. He now lives in Idaho with his wife, Judi. His son, Michaelbrent Collings, is a fantasy and horror writer.

Collings was introduced to Stephen King's work by a student, David A. Engebretson, in 1983, and published his first book on him, The Many Facets of Stephen King, in 1985; reading King led to his also studying and publishing on Koontz and Robert McCammon.

The World Horror Convention awarded him their Grand Master Award in 2016.

== Selected bibliography ==
=== Articles and papers ===
- "C. S. Lewis and the Music of Creation" (July–August 1979), Lamp-Post of the Southern California C.S. Lewis Society
- "The Mechanisms of Fantasy" (January 1980), Lamp-Post of the Southern California C.S. Lewis Society
- "To Be Still a Man: Abstraction and Concretion in C. S. Lewis" (January 1982), Lamp-Post of the Southern California C.S. Lewis Society
- "Beyond Deep Heaven: Generic Structure and Christian Message in C. S. Lewis's Ransom Novels", (December 1986), Lamp-Post of the Southern California C.S. Lewis Society
- "Brothers of the Head: Brian W. Aldiss's Psychological Landscape" (1988), Spectrum of the Fantastic: Selected Papers from the Fifth International Conference on the Fantastic in the Arts, Greenwood Press
- "Brian W. Aldiss" (1989), Reader's Guide to Twentieth Century Science Fiction Writers, American Library Association
- "To See the World the Poet's Way" In the Image of God: Theme, Characterization, and Landscape in the Fiction of Orson Scott Card. New York: Greenwood Press, (1990), Contemporary Literary Criticism. Ed.Jeffrey W. Hunter. Vol. 279. Detroit: Gale, 2010

=== Non-fiction books ===
- The Many Facets of Stephen King (1985), Starmont House, ISBN 0-930261-14-3
- The Shorter Works of Stephen King (1985), with David A. Engebretson, Starmont House, ISBN 0-930261-02-X
- Stephen King as Richard Bachman (1985), Starmont House, ISBN 0-930261-00-3
- The Annotated Guide to Stephen King: A Primary and Secondary Bibliography of the Works of America's Premier Horror Writer (1986), Starmont House, ISBN 0-930261-80-1
- The Films of Stephen King (1986), Starmont House, ISBN 0-930261-10-0
- Card Catalogue: The Science Fiction and Fantasy of Orson Scott Card (1987), Hypatia Press, ISBN 0-940841-01-0
- The Stephen King Phenomenon (1987), Starmont House, ISBN 0-930261-12-7
- In the Image of God: Theme, Characterization and Landscape in the Fiction of Orson Scott Card (1990), Greenwood Press, ISBN 0-313-26404-X
- Scaring Us to Death: The Impact of Stephen King on Popular Culture (1997), Borgo Press, ISBN 0-930261-37-2
- The Work of Orson Scott Card: An Annotated Bibliography and Guide (1997), with Boden Clarke
- Hauntings: The Official Peter Straub Bibliography (2000), Overlook Connection Press, ISBN 1-892950-15-4
- Storyteller: The Official Guide to the Works of Orson Scott Card (2001), Overlook Connection Press, ISBN 1-892950-26-X
- Horror Plum'd: An International Stephen King Bibliography and Guide 1960-2000 (2003), Overlook Connection Press, ISBN 1-892950-45-6
- Stephen King Is Richard Bachman, (March 2008), Overlook Connection Press, ISBN 1-892950-74-X

=== Novels ===
- The House Beyond the Hill (2007, Wildside Press, ISBN 1-4344-0066-2)
- Singer of Lies (2009, Borgo Press/Wildside Press, ISBN 978-1-4344-5710-3)
- The Slab (2011, Borgo Press/Wildside Press, ISBN 978-1-4344-1207-2)
- Static! (2011, Borgo Press/Wildside Press, ISBN 978-1-4344-3530-9)
- Shadow Valley (2011, Borgo Press/Wildside Press, ISBN 978-1-4344-3521-7)
- Writing Darkness (2012, CreateSpace, ISBN 978-1-4793-8404-4)

Wordsmith series

1. The Veil of Heaven (2009, Borgo Press/Wildside Press, ISBN 978-1-4344-0280-6)
2. The Thousand Eyes of Flame (2009, Borgo Press/Wildside Press, ISBN 978-1-4344-0281-3)
3. Three Tales of Omne (2010, Borgo Press/Wildside Press, ISBN 978-1-4344-1177-8, published in an omnibus with The Elder of Days by Robert Reginald)

=== Epic poem ===
- The Nephiad: An Epic Poem in XII Books (1996, Zarahemla Motets, ISBN 1-886405-52-2)

=== Poetry and fiction collections ===
- Naked to the Sun (1986, Starmont House, ISBN 0-930261-76-3)
- Dark Transformations: Deadly Visions of Change (1990, Starmont House, ISBN 1-55742-196-X)
- All Calm, All Bright: Christmas Offerings (2007, Borgo Press/Wildside Press, ISBN 978-1-4344-0172-4)
- In the Void: Poems of Science Fiction, Myth and Fantasy, & Horror (2009, Borgo Press/Wildside Press, ISBN 978-1-4344-5761-5)
- Wer Means Man and Other Tales of Wonder and Terror (2010, Borgo Press/Wildside Press, ISBN 978-1-4344-1187-7)
- Dear Emily and Other Poems (2016, CreateSpace, ISBN 978-1541095892)
- In the Haunting Darkness (2022, Hemelein Publications, ISBN 978-1-64278-060-4)

== See also ==
- Fire in the Pasture
