= Rocky Wood =

Australian writer (1959–2014)

- Born: 19 October 1959; Wellington, New Zealand
- Died: 1 December 2014 (aged 55); Melbourne, Australia
- Occupation: Writer
- Writing career
- Genres: Non-fiction, Horror
- Subjects: Stephen King; UFOs
- Website: www.facebook.com/rockywoodauthor

Rocky Wood (19 October 1959 – 1 December 2014) was a New Zealand-born Australian writer and researcher. He was best known for his books about horror author Stephen King. He was a freelance writer for over 35 years, and became the first author from outside North America or Europe to hold the position of president of the Horror Writers Association. In October 2010, Wood was diagnosed with motor neurone disease, and died from complications of the disease.

== Early life and education ==
Rocky Wood was born on 19 October, 1959 in Wellington, New Zealand, and lived in Melbourne, Australia with his family.

Wood's writing career began at university, where he wrote a national newspaper column in New Zealand on extra-terrestrial life and UFO-related phenomena and published other articles about the phenomenon worldwide, in the course of which research he met such figures as Erich von Däniken and J. Allen Hynek;

== Career ==
Wood had articles on the security industry published in the US, Canada, the UK, New Zealand, and South Africa.

== Works about Stephen King ==
In the Stephen King and horror communities, Wood was regarded as a leading expert on Stephen King's work. He is the co-author of The Complete Guide to the Works of Stephen King (Kanrock Partners, 2003, 2004); Stephen King: Uncollected, Unpublished (Cemetery Dance Publications, 2006); The Stephen King Collector's Guide (Kanrock Partners, 2007); Stephen King: The Non-Fiction (Cemetery Dance Publications, 2009) and the author of Stephen King: A Literary Companion (McFarland, 2011). In 2012 the Overlook Connection Press issued a fourth edition of Stephen King: Uncollected, Unpublished, extensively revised and with direct input from Stephen King, resolving many previous mysteries.

Wood assisted King with research for Doctor Sleep, the sequel to The Shining. King said in the Author's Note to Doctor Sleep: "Rocky Wood was my go-to guy for all things Shining, providing me with names and dates I had either forgotten or plain got wrong. He also provided reams of info on every recreational vehicle and camper under the sun (the coolest was Rose's EarthCruiser). The Rock knows my work better than I do myself. Look him up on the web sometime. He's got it going on."

Wood had also written many articles on King that have appeared in such magazines as Cemetery Dance, Dark Discoveries, and Lighthouse.

In 2002, he travelled to Orono, Maine and spent three weeks researching the Stephen King Archives at the Special Collections Unit of the Raymond H. Fogler Library at the University of Maine. Wood had undertaken five research trips to Maine in the course of his research on King's work.

His first King book was The Complete Guide to the Works of Stephen King, a 6000+ page encyclopedia on CD-ROM, which summarizes every story, every character, every place, and the entire timeline of King's work. In-depth information on all 270+ fiction works by Stephen King, 26,000 King characters, and 5,000 King places are included, along with adaptations of King's work to the big and small screens. The Complete Guide is used by Stephen King's office for research.

In his research, Wood rediscovered previously unknown King stories, including two written in his high school years, of which even the author did not have a copy. King agreed to allow the inclusion of another two previously unpublished pieces, Sword in the Darkness and "Dino" in Stephen King: Uncollected, Unpublished. That book covers about 100 King stories that had never been published or appeared only in obscure venues.

In 2005, he returned to Maine for a lengthy investigative trip into King's non-fiction, discovering over 40 previously unknown pieces, again including lost material from King's formative years, which he later provided to the author. King agreed to the inclusion of an obscure article, "My Little Serrated Security Blanket" in Wood's Stephen King: The Non-Fiction, which covers more than 600 individual items. Wood returned to Maine in 2007, 2008 and 2009 to continue his research. In 2008/9 he wrote the 'King of Horror' column for the Australian magazine, Black: Australian Dark Culture.

== Affiliations and award nominations ==
Wood was an active member and president of the Horror Writers Association (HWA), serving a two-year term from 1 November 2010 (having previously served a term from 2008 to 2010 as a trustee). He was the first author from outside North America or Europe to hold the position of president of the HWA. He was re-elected to a further two-year term in 2012. He was also an active member of International Thriller Writers (ITW).

Wood was president of the Australian American Association (Victoria) in Australia from 2008 to 2010, and was elected a life member in September 2010. He was also a member of the Australian Logistics Council from 2008 to 2012.

He was nominated for the HWA's Bram Stoker Award for Superior Achievement in Non-Fiction for Stephen King: Uncollected, Unpublished (2006) and Stephen King: The Non-Fiction (2009). He won the Bram Stoker Award for Superior Achievement in Non-Fiction for Stephen King: A Literary Companion (2011). He was a member of the Australian Horror Writers Association. He served as guest judge (Edited Publications) for the Australian Shadows Award, 2010.

Wood's first mainstream fiction was the graphic novel, Horrors! Great Tales of Fear and Their Creators (McFarland, 2010), a re-imagining of events in 19th century horror, illustrated by Glenn Chadbourne. Horrors! was nominated both for a Black Quill Non-Fiction Award and a for Best Illustrated Book or Graphic Novel in the 2011 Aurealis Awards. His second graphic novel was Witch Hunts: A Graphic History of the Burning Times (McFarland, 2012), examining the witch hunting phenomenon that plagued Europe and New England. It is co-written by Lisa Morton and illustrated by Greg Chapman and won the Bram Stoker Award for Superior Achievement on a Graphic Novel in 2012.

== Media appearances and conferences ==
Wood made many media appearances on TV, radio, and in the press, and spoke at conferences in the US, Canada, UK, Switzerland, Yugoslavia, Australia, and New Zealand.

Wood was keynote speaker at the 2003 Stephen King (SKEMER) Conference held in Estes Park, Colorado at the site of the hotel that featured in The Shining (2003). He spoke at Continuum 3 (2005), Continuum 4 (2006) and Continuum 5 (2009) in Melbourne, Australia; Conflux in Canberra, Australia (2006); at the Stephen King film festival (Dollar Baby Film Festival) held in King's hometown of Bangor, Maine in October 2005; at the World Horror Convention in Salt Lake City (2008); at the 68th World Science Fiction Convention in Melbourne (2010); at the World Horror Convention in Austin, Texas (2011) and the Horror Writers Association's Bram Stoker Weekends in Burbank (2009), on Long Island, New York (2011) and in New Orleans, Louisiana (2013).

He was a special guest at the World Horror Convention in Salt Lake City in March 2012.

He also addressed the Lisbon Historical Society in Lisbon Falls, Maine twice in July 2009 about inspirations from Stephen King's later childhood and teenage years in Durham, Maine and attending Lisbon High School.

== Personal life and death ==
Wood lived in Melbourne, Victoria.

In October 2010, Wood was diagnosed with motor neurone disease (amyotrophic lateral sclerosis). He died of complications on 1 December 2014.
