= Tie-in =

Work of fiction

A tie-in work is a work of fiction or other product based on a media property such as a film, video game, television series, board game, website, role-playing game or literary property. Tie-ins are authorized by the owners of the original property, and are a form of cross-promotion used primarily to generate additional income from that property and to promote its visibility.

== Types ==
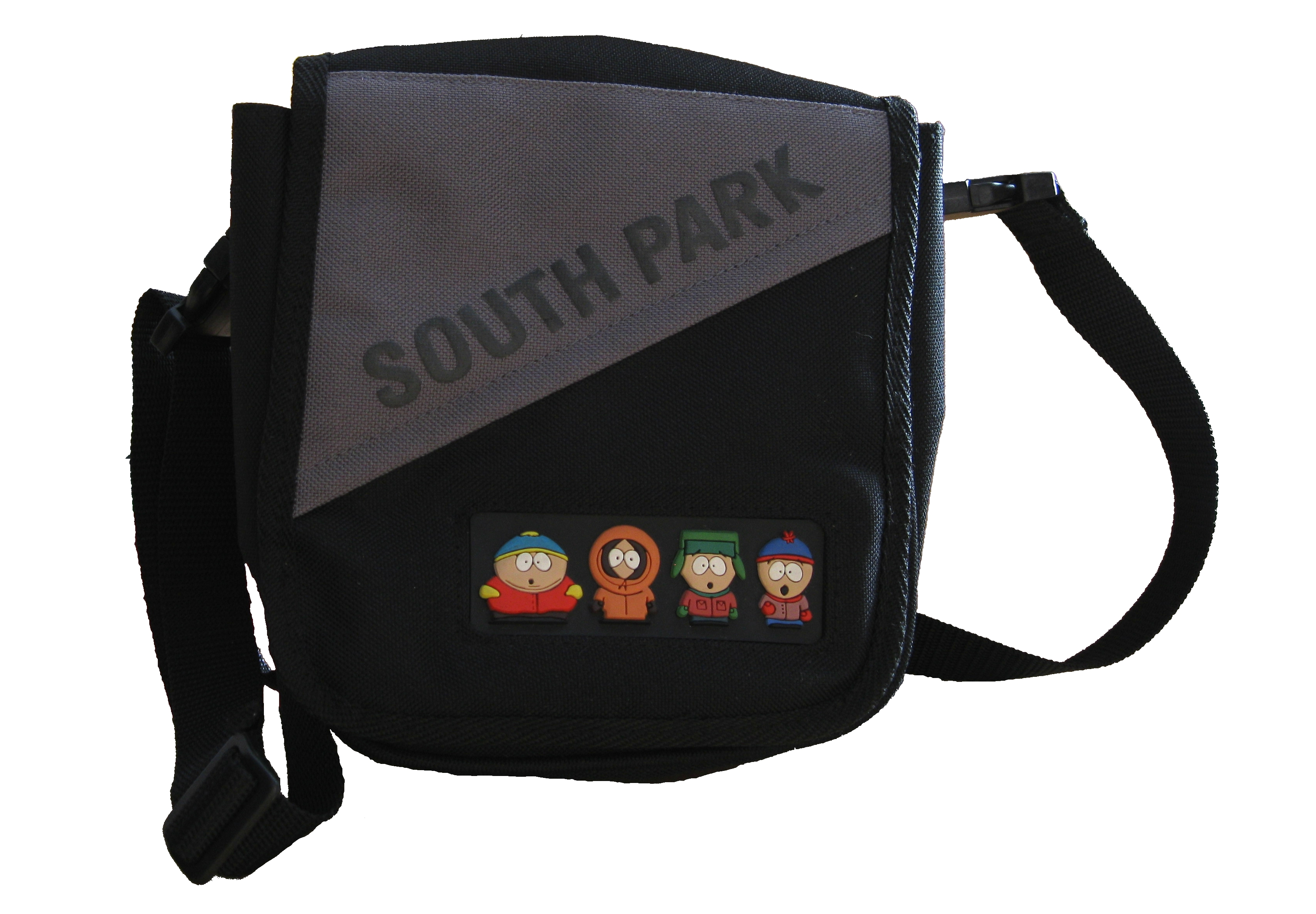
This pannier bag is a tie-in product from the TV series South Park.

Common tie-in products include literary works, which may be novelizations of a media property, original novels or story collections inspired by the property, or republished previously existing books, such as the novels on which a media property was based, with artwork or photographs from the property. According to publishing industry estimates, about one or two percent of the audience of a film will buy its novelization, making these relatively inexpensively produced works a commercially attractive proposition in the case of blockbuster film franchises. Although increasingly also a domain of previously established novelists, tie-in writing has the disadvantages, from the writers' point of view, of modest pay, tight deadlines and no ownership in the intellectual property created.

Tie-in products may also have a documentary or supplemental character, such as "making-of" books documenting the creation of a media property. Tie-in products also include other types of works based on the media property, such as soundtrack recordings, video games, or merchandise including toys and clothing.

=== Novelizations ===
A novelization is a derivative novel that adapts the story of a work created for another medium, such as a film, TV series, comic strip or video game. Film novelizations were particularly popular before the invention of home video, but continue to find commercial success as part of marketing campaigns for major films. They are often written by accomplished writers based on an early draft of the film's script and on a tight deadline.

=== Rebranding of previously published work ===
Tie-in books are sometimes reprints of novels rebranded to tie in with their film adaptation. As an example, after Roderick Thorp's 1979 novel Nothing Lasts Forever was adapted into the 1988 film Die Hard, it was retitled Die Hard with the film's poster on the cover. The Philip K. Dick novel Do Androids Dream of Electric Sheep? was similarly republished to tie in with Blade Runner, the film loosely based on the book.

A tie-in book linked to a film based on short fiction may be published featuring the adapted story, as well as other stories from the same author; for example, while Stephen King's novella "Apt Pupil" was adapted to the eponymous film, King's collection Different Seasons, which featured the story, was reprinted as Apt Pupil: A Novella in Different Seasons. Similarly, novels were published to tie in with the films Minority Report and Paycheck, featuring Philip K. Dick's original short stories "The Minority Report" and "Paycheck". The official organization linked to writing media tie-ins is the International Association of Media Tie-In Writers.

=== Expanded universes ===
Tie-in works may also tell new stories in the form of sequels, prequels and other spin-offs, creating an expanded universe based on the original work; for example, the many books, comics and video games set in an expanded universe based initially on the first Star Wars trilogy. In 2015, the New York Times noted the flourishing market for TV series tie-in novels, coinciding with the increasing cultural significance of quality television series. The increasing number of previously established novelists taking on tie-in works has also been credited with these works gaining a "patina of respectability" after having previously been disregarded in literary circles as derivative and mere merchandise.

=== Video games ===
Some video games are tie-in licences for films, television series or books.

Video game movie tie-ins are expensive for a game developer to license, and the game designers have to work within constraints imposed by the film studio, under pressure to finish the game in time for the film's release. The aim for the publishers is to increase hype and revenue, as the two industries effectively market one another's releases.

Film license video games have a reputation for being of poor quality; for example, Amiga Power awarding Psygnosis's three film licenses (Dracula, Cliffhanger and Last Action Hero, all reviewed in June 1994) 36% in total; that magazine being cynical towards licensed games in general, with The Blues Brothers being one of the few exceptions. One of the first movie tie-in games, Atari's E.T. the Extra-Terrestrial (1982) was deemed so bad it was cited as one cause of the video game industry crash. Such poor quality is often due to game developers forced to rush the product in order to meet the film's release date, or due to issues with adapting the original work's plot into an interactive form, such as in the case of the games based on the last two films of the Harry Potter film series, where one reviewer criticised some of the game's missions and side-quests as being unrelated to the film's storyline.

Video tie-in licences for novels tend to be adventure games. The Hobbit (1982) and The Hitchhiker's Guide to the Galaxy are text adventures, whilst I Have No Mouth, and I Must Scream (1995) is a point-and-click adventure and Neuromancer (1988) is a graphic adventure. Action games based on novels are less common (William Shatner's TekWar (1995), a first-person shooter). Novel tie-ins were published less frequently after the 1990s, with developers only taking risks with stories that had already been licensed for films.

== Revenue and structure ==
Tie-ins are considered an important part of the revenue-stream for any major media release, and both planning and licensing for such works often begins at the very earliest stages of creating such a property. Tie-ins provide both an important way of generating additional income from a property, and a way of satisfying the desires of fans who enthusiastically support a popular media property.

The lineage of tie-in works can be quite convoluted; for example, a novelization might be done of a video game, which was based on a television series, based on a film, based on a comic book which was the original media property. In several cases, a novelization has been released based on a movie which was in turn adapted from an original novel. In such cases, it is not uncommon to see the novelization and a film release of the original novel side by side on the same shelf.

These tie-ins can be considered as forms of "free advertising", as they create more exposure for the media property. Tie-ins need not have a direct association with the property; for example, a particular pizza company can offer coupons that are associated with the Teenage Mutant Ninja Turtles films, but that specific pizza company itself does not necessarily have to appear in the films. By this association, however, the pizza company is exposed to a bigger audience. If a media property does well, the tie-ins gain that positive exposure as well.

== Early examples ==
=== Film ===
The American fan magazine Photoplay, first published in 1911, originally presented short stories based on popular films of the era. It later adopted a more traditional nonfiction format.

=== Comics ===
The Adventures of Superman by George Lowther (illustrated by original Superman artist Joe Shuster) was published in 1942.

=== Television ===
Some early examples of TV tie-in books are Leave It to Beaver (1960), Here's Beaver! (1961), and Beaver and Wally (1961) by Beverly Cleary.

== See also ==
- Cross media marketing
- Media franchise
- Merchandising
- Expanded universe
- Toyetic
