= Shake hands =

Shake hands may refer to:

- Handshake
- Shake Hands with the Devil (book), a 2003 nonfiction book by Lieutenant-General Roméo Dallaire, a witness of the Rwandan genocide
- Shake Hands with the Devil: The Journey of Roméo Dallaire, a 2004 documentary film based on the book
- Shake Hands with the Devil (2007 film), a Canadian dramatic film based on the book
- "Shake Hands with Beef", a single by the band Primus
- "Let's Shake Hands", the debut single from the band The White Stripes
- Shake Hands Forever, a 1975 novel by Ruth Rendell in the Inspector Wexford series
- Shake Hands with the Devil (album), a solo album by Kris Kristofferson
- Shake Hands with the Devil (1959 film), a film set in 1921 Dublin
- "The Man Who Would Not Shake Hands", a short story by Stephen King
