= The Man Who Would Not Shake Hands =

- Short story by Stephen King
- Country: United States
- Language: English
- Genres: horror, short story

Publication
- Published in: Shadows 4 (1st release), Skeleton Crew
- Publication type: Anthology
- Media type: Print (Paperback)
- Publication date: 1982

"The Man Who Would Not Shake Hands" is a short story by American writer Stephen King, first published in the 1982 horror anthology Shadows 4, edited by Charles L. Grant. It was collected in Skeleton Crew in 1985.

== Plot summary ==
At a private club in Manhattan, an elderly man named George Gregson recounts a card game he played many years ago where he met an odd man named Henry Brower who refused to touch anyone, recoiling from contact in fear. After Brower wins the game, another player, Jason Davidson, leaps up and shakes his hand enthusiastically, causing Brower to scream and bolt from the room. Gregson then makes it his mission to find him and give him his winnings. It's revealed shortly thereafter that Davidson had died of a brain aneurysm. Gregson speaks with an old associate of the man, who tells him that Brower was cursed by an Indian shaman after an unfortunate incident in Bombay in which he accidentally caused the death of a boy. From that moment on, Brower has been cursed to cause the death of any living thing he touches. Gregson then attempts to track down Brower and meets an innkeeper who tells him that he discovered Brower dead in the inn, one hand firmly clasped in the other.

== Relation to other works ==
Like the novella "The Breathing Method" from King's collection Different Seasons, the story takes the form of a nested narrative told in a strange 'club' in Manhattan.

== Adaptations ==
"The Man Who Would Not Shake Hands" started principal photography on June 3, 2022, from Capital B Films. The screenplay was adapted from the Stephen King short story by Nicholas Bromund, who also directs, and co-written by Guthrie Roy Hartford.

== See also ==
- Stephen King short fiction bibliography
