= Burton Hatlen =

American academic

- Born: April 9, 1936; Santa Barbara, California, U.S.
- Died: January 21, 2008 (aged 71); Bangor, Maine, U.S.
- Education: University of California, Berkeley
- Occupations: Professor, Poet
- Notable work: I Wanted to Tell You
- Spouse(s): Barbara Karlson (1961-1983); Virginia Nees-Hatlen (1983-2008)

Burton Norval Hatlen (April 9, 1936 – January 21, 2008) was an American literary scholar and professor at the University of Maine. Hatlen worked closely with Carroll F. Terrell, an Ezra Pound scholar and co-founder of the National Poetry Foundation, to build the Foundation into an internationally known institution.

Hatlen was seen as a mentor by several of his former students, most notably author Stephen King and his wife, Tabitha King. In an afterword to his novel Lisey's Story, King paid tribute to Hatlen:

Burt was the greatest English teacher I ever had. It was he who first showed me the way to the pool, which he called “the language-pool, the myth-pool, where we all go down to drink.” That was in 1968. I have trod the path that leads there often in the years since, and I can think of no better place to spend one’s days; the water is still sweet, and the fish still swim.

== Early and personal life ==
Burton Hatlen was born on April 9, 1936, in Santa Barbara, California. His father Julius immigrated in 1909 from Norway. He married Lily Torvend, a second generation Norwegian-American; they sometimes spoke Norwegian at home. Julius worked as a farm worker, but eventually ran his own apricot orchard. The couple, who were Lutherans, had three sons of which Burton was the youngest.

Hatlen received a full scholarship at the University of California, Berkeley, where he earned his bachelor's degree. He later earned two separate master's degrees from Harvard University and Columbia University. Following his master's, Hatlen taught at colleges in Tennessee and Ohio. Hatlen finally earned his doctorate from the University of California, Davis in 1973. His doctoral dissertation was on the 17th century English poet John Milton.

Hatlen and his first wife, Barbara Karlson (b. 1938 d. 2010), had two daughters. The couple moved to Orrington, Maine, in 1967 and later divorced. He married his second wife, Virginia Nees-Hatlen, an English professor, in 1983. He stood at over six feet tall.

== Career ==
Hatlen arrived at the University of Maine in Orono, Maine, in 1967. He quickly became an active and, by all accounts, highly devoted faculty member in the school's Department of English. Hatlen often juggled heavy teaching and research schedules. He eventually became chair of the department, where he oversaw academic grant applications, nationwide promotions and academic tenures, and a host of other responsibilities. Hatlen delivered more than 100 academic papers from 1977 to 2007 alone, at conferences ranging from Finland, Canada, the United States, London and Paris. He also served as Interim Dean of the College of Arts and Humanities for one year.

Hatlen never published a collection of his own scholarly writings. However, his poetics and other writings often appeared in literary scholarly journals. And his editorial work at the National Poetry Foundation had a profound impact on a scholarly community interested in the objectivist tradition and contemporary North American writers as diverse as H.D., Allen Ginsberg, Amiri Baraka, Ted Enslin, and Margaret Avison. His edited collection of essays George Oppen: Man and Poet was a work of which he was especially proud. He also contributed editorials and letters on local and international politics to local Maine newspapers occasionally.

Hatlen received the UM Presidential Research and Creative Achievement Award for his work in 1996. In 1999, Hatlen volunteered to cut his salary so the Department of English could hire two new professors, instead of only one. He continued to work part-time, even when he became ill, though he carried a full-time work load. He spent the later part of his academic career focusing on scholarship on a wide range of modernist poets and fiction writers (chiefly Kay Boyle and Stephen King), as well as continuing to write his own elegiac poetry.

Hatlen was known as a campus activist. He marched against both the Vietnam War in the 1960s, as well as the War in Iraq, as recently as 2007, in Bangor, Maine. He was one of the founders and a lifelong member of the campuses Marxist-Socialist committee, which oversees a lecture series and an interdisciplinary minor.

=== National Poetry Foundation ===
He began working with Carroll Terrell shortly after his arrival at the University of Maine. Terrell is best known as a noted Ezra Pound scholar and the founder of the National Poetry Foundation. Together, Terrell and Hatlen, in conjunction with the University of Maine English department, built the Foundation into an internationally known and respected academic center based at UM. Under Terrell and Hatlen, the Foundation focused on the works of Pound, as well as modern forms of poetry.

One of the academic missions of the National Poetry Foundation was the publication of two journals, the Paideuma and the Sagetrieb. The Paideuma focuses on Pound studies, and on American and British modernism. The second journal, Sagetrieb, which was founded by Hatlen in 1982, focuses on the study of contemporary and Objectivist poets such as George Oppen, William Carlos Williams and Louis Zukofsky.

The Foundation became known for its summer poetry conferences which gathered poets and scholars at the University of Maine. The conference also allowed students and professional, published poets to meet informally and get to know one another, which closely followed Hatlen's own informal teaching style.

Hatlen became director of the National Poetry Foundation in 1991.

== Stephen King ==
Burton Hatlen formed a writing workshop in the late 1960s, with fellow UM colleague, Jim Bishop, and several other writers. These writers included several of Hatlen's students, among them Stephen King, Tabitha Spruce, poet Sylvester Pollet and Michael Alpert, who currently serves as director of the University of Maine Press as of 2008. King and Spruce fell in love and married after meeting at Hatlen's workshops. The members of Hatlen's writing workshop continued to meet on and off for the next 15 years. Hatlen's own contributions to the workshop culminated in 1987, when he published his only book of poetry, I Wanted to Tell You.

King and Hatlen remained personally and professionally close throughout Hatlen's life. Hatlen helped King develop his own style through his workshops. King often sent his unpublished manuscripts to Hatlen for his review and perusal. King told the Bangor Daily News that, "He [Hatlen] saw so much more of what I was doing than I did." Hatlen published papers on the work of his most famous student, such as "Stephen King and the American Dream". King named a handful of his characters after Hatlen, including Brooks Hatlen, the prison librarian in Rita Hayworth and the Shawshank Redemption.

Stephen and Tabitha King donated $4 million to the University of Maine in 1997, which included $1 million specifically for Hatlen to hire new arts and humanities professors.

== Death ==
Burton Hatlen died of pneumonia at the Eastern Maine Medical Center in Bangor, Maine, on January 21, 2008. He had been undergoing treatment for prostate cancer over the last 10 years. He was 71 years old and was survived by his second wife, Virginia Nees-Hatlen, his two daughters, Julia Hatlen (and partner Mark Hayes) and Inger Hatlen (and husband Joseph Daniels), stepdaughter Hedda Steinhoff, and granddaughter Solveig Daniels. In addition, he was survived by his brother Philip Hatlen, nieces and nephews, and other relatives in California and Norway.

Stephen King told the Bangor Daily News in reaction to Hatlen's death that, "Burt was more than a teacher to me. He was also a mentor and a father figure...He made people — and not just me — feel welcome in the company of writers and scholars, and let us know there was a place for us at the table."

In 2014, Sagetrieb published a Festschrift for Burton Hatlen with essays by Marjorie Perloff, Barrett Watten, and others.
