= The Breathing Method =

Novella by Stephen King

- Author: Stephen King
- Language: English
- Genre: Horror
- Published in: Different Seasons
- Publisher: Viking Press
- Publication date: 1982
- Publication place: United States
- Media type: Print (Hardcover)

The Breathing Method is a novella by American writer Stephen King, originally released as part of his Different Seasons collection in 1982. It is placed in the section entitled "A Winter's Tale". It is the only one of the four stories in the collection not to have been adapted for film.

== Plot ==
David, the narrator of the frame tale, is a middle-aged Manhattan lawyer. At the invitation of a senior partner, he joins a strange gentlemen's club where the members, in addition to reading, chatting and playing billiards and chess, like to tell stories, some of which range into the bizarre and macabre.

One Thursday before Christmas, the elderly physician Dr. Emlyn McCarron tells a story about an episode that took place early in his long and varied career: that of a patient, Sandra Stansfield, who was determined to give birth to her illegitimate child, no matter what, despite financial problems and social disapproval. McCarron comes to admire her bravery and humor, and the implication is that he has even fallen a bit in love with her.

Sandra masters Dr. McCarron's unusual (for the 1930s) breathing method intended to help her through childbirth. However, when she goes into labor and is on the way to the hospital on an icy winter night, her taxi crashes and she is decapitated. McCarron arrives at the crash site and realizes that Sandra is somehow still alive. Her lungs in her decapitated body are still pumping air, as her head, some feet away, is working to sustain the breathing method so that the baby can be born. McCarron manages to deliver the infant alive and well.

On a contradictory end note, Sandra whispers "Thank you"—her severed head mouthing the words, which are distortedly heard from the throat jutting from her headless body. McCarron is able to tell her that her baby is a boy and to see that she has registered this before she dies. McCarron and his office nurse pay for the woman's burial, for she has no one else.

The child is adopted, and despite the confidential nature of adoption records, McCarron is able to keep track of him over the years. When the man is "not yet 45", and an accomplished college professor, McCarron arranges to meet him socially. "He had his mother's determination, gentlemen," he tells the club members, "and his mother's hazel eyes."

== Relation to other works ==
King's short story "The Man Who Would Not Shake Hands" takes place in the same strange 'club' in Manhattan as The Breathing Method.

== Reception ==
The Breathing Method was a finalist for the 1983 World Fantasy Award for Best Novella.

== Adaptation ==
A film adaptation of The Breathing Method was announced in 2012 as being in development, with Scott Derrickson directing and Scott Teems screenwriting. Later, in 2019, another announcement was made, again involving Derrickson. As of 2024 the project is in development hell.

== See also ==
- "The Man Who Would Not Shake Hands"
- "Rush Call"
- Stephen King short fiction bibliography
