= Apt Pupil =

1982 novella by Stephen King

- Author: Stephen King
- Language: English
- Genre: Psychological thriller
- Published in: Different Seasons
- Publisher: Viking Press
- Publication date: 1982
- Publication place: United States
- Media type: Print (Hardcover)

Apt Pupil (1982) is a novella by Stephen King subtitled "Summer of Corruption", originally published in the 1982 novella collection Different Seasons with a more dramatic bent, rather than the horror fiction for which King is famous. Apt Pupil consists of 30 chapters, many of which are headed by a month. Set in a fictional Southern California suburb called "Santo Donato", the story unfolds over a period of about four years, with most of the action taking place during the first year and the last months. It is the only novella in Different Seasons to be narrated in the third person.

== Plot summary ==
In 1974, teenager Todd Bowden arrives at the doorstep of elderly German immigrant Arthur Denker, accusing him of being the wanted Nazi war criminal Kurt Dussander. The old man reluctantly acknowledges his true identity. Todd asks to hear detailed stories about his crimes, having recently become interested in the Holocaust. If Dussander refuses, Todd will turn him over to the authorities. Over the next months, Todd visits Dussander daily under the pretext of reading to him, all the while badgering him into revealing more details of his atrocities. Todd soon forces Dussander to wear a replica SS Oberleutnants uniform and march on command.

Over time, Todd also begins to have nightmares and sees his grades slip. After his father confronts him about his grades, he forges his report cards before giving them to his parents. Eventually, Todd risks failing several courses. Ed French, Todd's guidance counselor, requests an appointment with the Bowdens. Todd and Dussander concoct a ruse, having Dussander go to French's appointment while posing as Todd's grandfather, Victor. Dussander falsely claims Todd's grades reflect problems at home and promises to make sure they improve; French notices Todd's "grandfather" doesn't mention him by name.

Knowing that Todd has been doctoring his report cards and knowingly socialized with a war criminal, Dussander blackmails him into spending his visits studying. Todd eventually improves his schoolwork. Having no longer any use for Dussander, Todd resolves to kill him and make it look like an accident. Todd had earlier claimed to have given a letter about Dussander to a friend; if anything should happen to Todd, the letter will be sent to the authorities. However, before Todd can kill Dussander, the old man realizes Todd's intentions and claims to have written about Todd's involvement with him, and put his statement into a safe deposit box that will be found upon his death. Both Dussander and Todd are bluffing.

Over the next few months, Todd murders several homeless vagrants; he finds that committing murder helps with his nightmares. As years pass, his visits to Dussander become less frequent. He loses his virginity, but finds sex unsatisfying compared to the thrill of killing. He thinks his failure at sex is because his girlfriend is Jewish. When circumstances do not allow him to continue his killings, he picks a concealed spot overlooking the freeway and aims at people in passing cars with his hunting rifle. Dussander, suffering from his own nightmares, has also taken to killing the homeless, burying the bodies in his basement. Despite their connection, Dussander and Todd are not immediately aware of each other's exploits.

One night, when Dussander is digging a grave for his latest victim, he has a heart attack. He summons Todd, who buries the body and cleans up the crime scene before calling an ambulance. At the hospital, Dussander shares a room with Morris Heisel, an elderly Jewish man and Holocaust survivor who recognizes "Mr. Denker" but cannot place him. Todd eventually visits Dussander at the hospital. Dussander has read about the homeless men murdered by Todd and tells him not to get careless.

A few days later, Heisel realizes Denker is Dussander, the commandant of the camp where his wife and daughters were murdered in gas chambers. Israeli Nazi hunter Weiskopf visits Dussander, saying he has been found out. After Weiskopf leaves, Dussander steals drugs from the hospital dispensary and commits suicide. Police detective Richler, accompanied by Weiskopf, later interviews Todd. A vagrant later recognizes Todd as the last person seen with several of the homeless victims and notifies the police.

Meanwhile, French meets Todd's real grandfather, who bears no physical resemblance to Dussander. Suspicious, French checks Todd's old report cards and finds they have been tampered with. Identifying Dussander as the man who he actually met, French confronts Todd, who responds by fatally shooting him. Todd's sanity breaks. He takes his rifle and ammunition to his hideout by the freeway and embarks on a shooting spree, resulting in his death at the hands of the authorities five hours later.

== Connection to King's other works ==
- Kurt Dussander remembers using a "bank in the State of Maine" to purchase stocks under an assumed name. He goes on to say that the banker who bought them for Dussander went to jail for murdering his wife a year after he purchased them. He even references Andy Dufresne by name — he remembers the name because "it sounds a little like mine." Dufresne is a central character in Rita Hayworth and Shawshank Redemption, the novella preceding Apt Pupil in Different Seasons.
- When confronting Todd about his murders, Dussander mentions a serial killer named "Springheel Jack". This killer is the focus of "Strawberry Spring", a short story published in the King collection Night Shift (1978).
- The guidance counselor Ed French mentions his hotel room is number 217, the same as the famous Overlook Hotel room in The Shining. Furthermore, in The Shining, Jack Torrance is working on a play that includes a character named Denker, the same name as Dussander's alter ego. This has led some fans to speculate that Apt Pupil is Torrance's play. In the afterword to Different Seasons, King mentions having written Apt Pupil immediately after The Shining.

== Media ==
- In 1987, an attempt at an adaptation by Alan Bridges was started but never finished. It starred Ricky Schroder as the lead Todd Bowden, and Nicol Williamson as Kurt Dussander. It was stated that about 40 minutes were shot. Other sources have stated that 75% of the movie was shot. It was never finished due to loss of money. Once the necessary finances were collected to finish the movie, Schroder was deemed too old for the role, so the project was abandoned. King stated he saw the unfinished rough cut with the footage shot and thought it was "very good".
- The 1987 song "A Skeleton in the Closet" by the thrash metal band Anthrax is based on the novella.
- In 1995, Chicago's Defiant Theatre staged a full-scale adaptation of the novella at the Preston Bradley Center in Chicago. The novella was adapted and directed for the stage by Christopher Johnson. Veteran stage and film actor William J. Norris starred as Kurt Dussander.
- Sony Pictures released a film version of Apt Pupil in 1998. The film was directed by Bryan Singer. Brad Renfro stars as Todd Bowden and Ian McKellen stars as Dussander. The ending of the film is significantly different.
- Funk supergroup Cameo frequently adds the lyric "Don't pull a Bowden" when performing the anti-violence song "Word Up".
- The 2011 Family Guy episode "German Guy" is a parody of the novella.

== See also ==
- Stephen King short fiction bibliography
