= Apt Pupil (film) =

1998 film by Bryan Singer

- Theatrical release poster
- Directed by: Bryan Singer
- Screenplay by: Brandon Boyce
- Based on: Apt Pupil by Stephen King
- Produced by: Bryan Singer; Don Murphy; Jane Hamsher
- Starring: Ian McKellen; Brad Renfro
- Cinematography: Newton Thomas Sigel
- Edited by: John Ottman
- Music by: John Ottman
- Production companies: TriStar Pictures; Phoenix Pictures; Bad Hat Harry
- Distributed by: Sony Pictures Releasing
- Release date: October 23, 1998
- Running time: 111 minutes
- Country: United States
- Language: English
- Budget: $14 million
- Box office: $8.9 million (US)

Apt Pupil is a 1998 American thriller film directed by Bryan Singer and starring Ian McKellen and Brad Renfro. It is based on the 1982 novella Apt Pupil by Stephen King. In the 1980s in southern California, high school student Todd Bowden (Renfro) discovers fugitive Nazi war criminal Kurt Dussander (McKellen) living in his neighborhood under the pseudonym Arthur Denker. Bowden, obsessed with Nazism and acts of the Holocaust, persuades Dussander to share his stories, and their relationship stirs malice in each of them.

The novella was first published in King's 1982 collection Different Seasons. Producer Richard Kobritz sought to adapt the novella into a film during the 1980s, but two actors he invited to play Dussander died. When filming began in 1987, a loss of financing led to the production being shut down. Forty minutes of usable footage existed, but production was never revived. In 1995, when rights to the novella returned to King, Bryan Singer petitioned King for an opportunity to adapt the novella. With King's support, Singer filmed Apt Pupil with McKellen and Renfro in Altadena, California, in 1997. Singer shortened the novella's storyline, reduced its violence, and changed the ending. Singer called Apt Pupil "a study in cruelty" with Nazism only serving as a vehicle for the capacity of evil.

During the $14 million production, a lawsuit was filed by several extras, including some underage who alleged that they were told to strip naked during a shower scene. There was no cause to file criminal charges, and a civil-case lawsuit was dismissed due to insufficient evidence. The film was released in the United States and Canada on October 23, 1998 by Sony Pictures Releasing to mixed reviews and made $8.9 million against a $14 million budget. The main actors won several minor awards for their performances.

== Plot ==
In 1984 Southern California, 16-year-old high school student Todd Bowden discovers that his elderly neighbor, Arthur Denker, is actually Kurt Dussander—a former Nazi concentration camp commandant, who is now a fugitive war criminal. Todd, fascinated with Nazi atrocities perpetrated during World War II, blackmails Dussander, forcing him to share disturbing stories of what it was like working at Nazi extermination camps and how it felt to participate in genocide.

Todd purchases an SS uniform from a costume shop and forces Dussander to wear it. As he spends more time with Dussander, his schoolwork suffers, he loses interest in his girlfriend, and he conceals his bad grades from his parents. Dussander begins blackmailing Todd in return, forcing him to work to restore his grades by threatening to expose the subterfuge and his dalliance with Nazism to his parents. Dussander even poses as Todd's grandfather and goes to an appointment with Todd's school counselor Edward French. Talking about the war crimes affects both the old man and the young boy. An intoxicated Dussander tries and fails to kill a cat with his gas oven. Dussander also takes pride in Todd's remarkable turnaround, going from near-dropout to straight-A student in a matter of weeks.

One night, Dussander tries to kill a homeless person who earlier had seen him in the uniform. When Dussander has a heart attack, he calls Todd, who finishes the killing, cleans up, and calls an ambulance for Dussander. At the hospital, Dussander is recognized by a death camp survivor sharing his room. He is arrested and an extradition to Israel is arranged. Todd graduates as valedictorian and gives a speech about Icarus, saying, "All great achievements arose from dissatisfaction. It is the desire to do better, to dig deeper, that propels civilization to greatness." The scene is juxtaposed in a montage with Dussander's home being searched and the corpse being found in the basement.

Todd is questioned about his relationship with Dussander and he convinces the police that he knew nothing of the man's true identity. A group of Neo-Nazis demonstrates outside the hospital; realizing his situation is hopeless, Dussander commits suicide by giving himself an air embolism. When French learns that the man who met Todd at school was not Todd's grandfather but a war criminal, he confronts Todd, who then blackmails French into silence by threatening to accuse him of making inappropriate sexual advances.

== Cast ==
Actor		Role
Ian McKellen	...	Kurt Dussander / Arthur Denker
Brad Renfro	...	Todd Bowden
David Schwimmer	...	Edward French
Bruce Davison	...	Richard Bowden
Ann Dowd	...	Monica Bowden
James Karen	...	Victor Bowden
Elias Koteas	...	Archie
Joe Morton	...	Dan Richler
Jan Tříska	...	Isaac Weiskopf
Michael Byrne	...	Ben Kramer
Heather McComb	...	Becky Trask
Joshua Jackson	...	Joey

Ian McKellen stars as Kurt Dussander, a Nazi war criminal who hides in America under the pseudonym Arthur Denker. Screenwriter Brandon Boyce described Dussander as being "a composite of these ghosts of World War II" but not based on any real-life individual. McKellen was attracted to the role because he was impressed with Singer's The Usual Suspects and saw the role of Dussander as "a nice, meaty part and difficult". Singer, who enjoyed McKellen in John Schlesinger's 1995 film Cold Comfort Farm, invited the actor to take the role. The character's language was written originally for "a very stoic German", but Singer felt that McKellen's "complex" personality could contribute to the character. The director said of choosing McKellen, "I felt if I could combine his complexity, his colorfulness, to the stoic German character it would create a character that, although evil, would garner more sympathy and would be more enjoyable for the audience to watch."

Brad Renfro stars alongside McKellen as Todd Bowden, a 16-year-old who discovers Denker's criminal past. Singer auditioned a couple of hundred young men and chose 14-year-old Renfro, saying of him, "Brad was the brightest, the most intense and the most real. Not only could he have the intensity when we wanted, there was a hollowness that he could convey, and by the end of the picture he had to become this empty vessel." Portraying a manipulative character temporarily influenced Renfro, who said that people around him were worried about his state of mind. Renfro said of his performance, "It's a trip I have to take. People just kind of have to leave me alone when I'm doing it. It's my job." He described Todd as a "very articulate boy" who unveils himself as a "monster", which also signified a departure from his previous roles as the "rebel" or the "oversensitive bad boy". Singer described his impression of the character:

I don't believe for one minute that [Todd Bowden] was pure as the driven snow. The capacity to blackmail an old man — obviously there's a search for something going on that's a good hard step beyond innocence. I think he had it within him, some emptiness that needed fulfillment and taken to a new place, a new direction. His school, his parents, his environment weren't doing it for him. This particular individual came along before some other, but it perhaps could have been drugs, it could have been rape. Todd was probably not a very good guy. But that kind of bad guy can exist within a lot more people than we realize.

David Schwimmer plays Edward French, Todd Bowden's high school guidance counselor. Before Schwimmer, Kevin Pollak was attached to the role. While Schwimmer was known for his comedic role on the television show Friends, Singer was impressed by the actor's performance in a Los Angeles stage production and decided to cast him as the counselor.

== Production ==
Under the studio Sony Pictures Entertainment, Apt Pupil was directed by Bryan Singer based on a screenplay by Brandon Boyce that adapted the 1982 novella Apt Pupil by Stephen King. The production was "a Sony Pictures Entertainment release from TriStar Pictures of a Phoenix Pictures presentation of a Bad Hat Harry production".

=== Previous production attempt ===
When Stephen King's novella Apt Pupil was published as part of his collection Different Seasons in 1982, producer Richard Kobritz optioned feature film rights to the novella. Kobritz met with actor James Mason to play the novella's war criminal Kurt Dussander, but Mason died in July 1984 before production as a result of a heart attack. The producer also approached Richard Burton for the role, but Burton also died in August that same year. By 1987 production on the film began with Nicol Williamson cast as Kurt Dussander, and 17-year-old Rick Schroder was cast as Todd Bowden. In that year, Alan Bridges began direction of the film with a script co-written by Ken Wheat and his brother Jim Wheat. After ten weeks of filming, the production suffered from a lack of funds from its production company Granat Releasing, and the film had to be placed on hold. Kobritz sought to revive production, but when the opportunity came a year later, Schroder had aged too considerably for the film to work. Forty minutes of usable footage was abandoned.

=== Direction under Bryan Singer ===
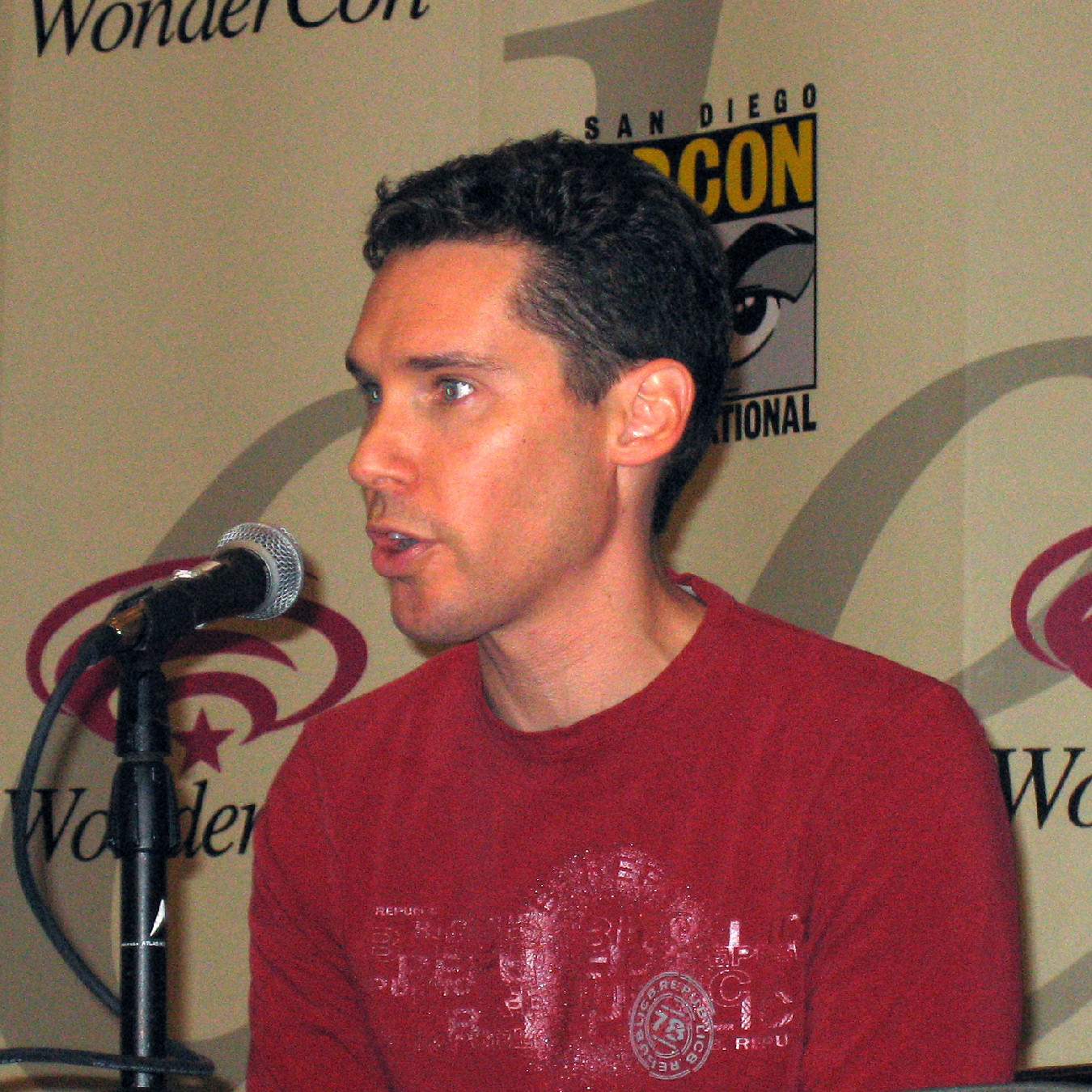
Director Bryan Singer in 2006

Bryan Singer first read Apt Pupil when he was 19 years old, and when he became a director, he wanted to adapt the novella into a film. In 1995, Singer asked his friend and screenwriter Brandon Boyce to write a spec script adapting the novella. Boyce recalled the writing process, "I thought it was a great stageplay, actually ... two people, pretty much in a house talking. My script was completely on spec, so, if it didn't work out, at least I'd have a writing sample." When the original option to the novella expired in 1995, Stephen King sued to get the rights back. Singer and Boyce then provided to King a first draft of their script and a copy of Singer's film The Usual Suspects (1995), which had yet to be publicly released. Impressed with Singer, King optioned the rights to the director for $1, arranging to be compensated when the film was released. Singer said of King's ultimate response to the film, despite some changes made to the source material, "Stephen loved it. He seemed to think I captured the mood of the piece." The director appreciated being able to make a Stephen King horror film but with less supernatural terror and more character-driven terror. Singer spoke of his goal, "There have been a lot of fun horror movies like Nightmare on Elm Street and Scream, and I Know What You Did Last Summer. But I miss movies like The Shining, The Exorcist, and The Innocents by Jack Clayton, so this is a movie sort of in the spirit of the real horror movie."

Singer described Apt Pupil's premise as a "study in cruelty". He prepared for the film by reading books like the 1996 history book Hitler's Willing Executioners, which confirmed his beliefs that Nazi war criminals felt "guiltless and matter-of-fact about what they did". He referred to how young Todd Bowden's interactions with Nazi war criminal Kurt Dussander start to affect him, "I liked the idea of the infectious nature of evil ... The notion that anybody has the capacity within them to be cruel if motivated properly is, I think, a scary concept." The director also perceived the film as not about the Holocaust, believing that the Nazi war criminal could have been replaced by one of Pol Pot's executioners or a mass murderer from Russia. "It wasn't about fascism or National Socialism. It was about cruelty and the ability to do awful deeds, to live with them and be empowered by them," Singer said. To this end, the director sought to avoid overt use of swastikas and other Nazi symbols. He was also attracted to the film as "[an] idea that the collective awfulness of this terrible thing that happened decades ago in Europe had somehow crept up across the ocean and through time, like a golem, into this beautiful Southern California suburban neighborhood".

Singer turned down directing opportunities with films like The Truman Show and The Devil's Own after the success of The Usual Suspects. He instead pursued Apt Pupil, "It was a very dark subject matter, and it was something that came from passion." He acknowledged in retrospect that Apt Pupil "wasn't really supposed to be a big success". Singer was financially supported by producer Scott Rudin and the production company Spelling Films. Ian McKellen was cast as Dussander, and Brad Renfro was cast as Bowden. With $1 million paid toward pre-production, filming was scheduled to begin in June 1996. Due to financial disagreements between Singer and Rudin, the start date was pushed back and subsequently canceled. Singer and his production team stayed together while producer Don Murphy and his partner Jane Hamsher sought refinancing. Mike Medavoy, a former chairman of TriStar Pictures, rescued the production with the financial backing of his production company Phoenix Pictures. The company provided filmmakers with $14 million to produce Apt Pupil. Filming took place on location in Altadena, California. Singer related to how Todd Bowden rebelled against his suburban environment. The director used the name of his high school football team, the Pirates, and the green-and-gold team colors in the film, saying, "I just projected my own childhood right out to Southern California."

=== Editing and composition ===
John Ottman served as both film editor and music composer for Apt Pupil. When he edited the film, he found it a challenge to create the proper musical score. Ottman recalled, "Normally, an editor will score scenes with temporary music from CDs, and so forth, and nothing I could find worked for this film." The composer sought a mix between the scores of the science fiction film 2001: A Space Odyssey (1968) and the military-based comedy 1941 (1979) to create an "otherworldly pastiche". Ottman said of his approach:

When you throw a cat in the oven, it's easy to have someone in the orchestra slam a hammer down on an anvil, scaring the hell out of everyone. The hard part is manipulating the story and accenting the characters. In the beginning, when Todd is laying down the rules, there's a certain repetitive thematic idea you hear. You hear the same music when Dussander is turning the tables on Todd, which makes you remember the first scene ... You hope people are subliminally making the connection that the tables are turning back and forth.

Another scene in which Ottman meshed his editing and composing duties was when Dussander wakes up in the hospital with the television show The Jeffersons playing in the background. Ottman explained his intent for the scene, "I used The Jeffersons as this innocuous thing—going between him and the television—so that when he does open his eyes, it scares the hell out of you ... I added this deafening Bartok pizz, which is when all the violins pluck their strings really loud and they create this gnarly, unsettling sound." Ottman recorded the film's score with the Seattle Symphony.

== Critical analysis ==
=== Obsession with Nazism and the Holocaust ===
In The Films of Stephen King, Dennis Mahoney writes that the obsession with Nazism and the Holocaust that unfolds in Apt Pupil is the result of the paternal bond between Nazi war criminal Kurt Dussander and high school student Todd Bowden. Such bonds are common themes in Stephen King's works: "King's portrayal of evil most often appears to require an active, illicit bond between a male (often in the role of a father or father surrogate) and a younger, formerly innocent individual (often in the role of a biological or surrogate progeny) who is initiated into sin". In the film, the year 1984 highlights, in addition to Orwellian overtones, the time in American history in which the Holocaust is treated as a week-long course with little time "to be tempered with self-questioning as to the motivations behind it". Bowden's obsession with the Holocaust is a key plot device "wherein the past has this unbreakable hold on the present". The film's opening sequence shows how Bowden treats this history as a simulacrum in which the history becomes his own, as evidenced by his head's brief overlapping with the Nazis he is studying. Though history becomes alive for Bowden, he perceives it through the perpetrators (namely Dussander) and not through the victims, characterizing Bowden as "apt" in the sense of "a natural tendency to ... undesirable behavior".

Mahoney says language serves as "a vehicle for corruption", as Dussander tells Bowden horrific stories of his service at the fictional Death Camp of Patin. Bowden, in listening to the stories, becomes "a vampiric extension of the evil" that Dussander exhibits. The sharing of stories lead both Dussander and Bowden to have nightmares, and for Bowden, the nightmares are "a past that is becoming ever more present". One of the key motifs of the film is that "a door was opened that could not be shut", referring to Dussander's confession about following orders and being unable to hold back. The motif is also conveyed in the scene in which Bowden forces Dussander to put on a Schutzstaffel uniform and to march to Bowden's commands. Dussander continues marching despite Bowden's insistences to stop, emulating the premise of Goethe's poem The Sorcerer's Apprentice in which the untrained apprentice uses magic to enchant brooms and lacks the skill to stop them. The scene is "the figurative and literal turning point in the film".

=== Sadomasochism, homoeroticism, and homophobia ===
Mahoney says that sadomasochism, homoeroticism, and homophobia are highlighted in Bryan Singer's retelling of Stephen King's novella. In Frames of Evil: The Holocaust as Horror in American Film, Caroline Picart and David Frank write that the face of evil is represented in the film as Nazism, oft labeled as "quintessentially innate [and] supernaturally crafty", but also "in a more subterranean way, dangerously blurring ... the boundaries between homoeroticism and homosexuality". The Nazi monstrosity in Apt Pupil is structured through sexual "abnormality", where a series of binary dichotomies are introduced: "normal versus monstrous, heterosexual versus homosexual, and healthy versus sick". Picart and Frank go on to describe an additional dichotomy, "victimizer (masculinized) versus victim (feminized)", that reflects the film's "hidden tensions" in which Bowden and Dussander's roles of powers are reversible. While the "set of perversions" that unfold in the novella are misogynistic, the film unfolds the set as "ambivalently homoerotic and homophobic". The film removes the novella's misogyny and leaves intact the underlying homoeroticism of the central characters. The film also expounds the connection between homophobia and how male Holocaust victims are portrayed.

The central characters Todd Bowden and Kurt Dussander are onscreen most of the time, and they are frequently framed in close proximity, which Picart and Frank describe as "[intensifying] a homoerotic intimacy [which is] punctuated by dread of contact with the monstrous". Homoeroticism in Apt Pupil is further demonstrated by the focus on Todd's body. In the opening scene in which Bowden is in his bedroom during a stormy night, "the ever-encroaching camera and the lighting fetishize Todd's youthful body", similar to the fetishism of the female body in films like Psycho (1960). This depiction creates a dualism in which "he is now simultaneously dangerous and endangered" in his homophobic and homoerotic ties to Nazism.

When Bowden gives Dussander an SS uniform to wear and in which to march under Bowden's orders, the student's demands are more heightened in the film as "more dominant and voyeuristic", according to Picart and Frank. Bowden tells Dussander, "I tried to do this the nice way, but you don't want it. So fine, we'll do this the hard way. You will put this on, because I want to see you in it. Now move!" The editing style of the Nazi march scene juxtaposes Dussander marching in the uniform and Bowden reacting to the march. Shots of Bowden's reaction are from a low angle, which reflects "the sexual difference between the characters"; Bowden is masculinized as "the bearer of the [sexual] gaze", and Dussander is feminized as "the object of the gaze". The cutting between Bowden and Dussander "corroborates a homoerotic arrangement of images" which visualizes the latent homoeroticism of the scene from the novella. When Dussander speeds up his march and Bowden tells him to stop, the sped-up shot reverse shot "radically [ruptures] the structure of power", where Bowden loses "control of his sadistic power over Dussander".

== Differences between novella and film ==
Stephen King's novella Apt Pupil begins in 1974, when Todd Bowden is in junior high, and it ends with him graduating from high school. In Bryan Singer's film, the story takes place fully in 1984, when Todd Bowden is in his last year in high school. In the novella, for three years leading to the end of the story, Todd Bowden and discovered Nazi war criminal Kurt Dussander independently murder a large number of hobos and transients, whereas in the film, the murders are condensed to Dussander's attempt to kill the homeless man Archie. Singer sought to reduce the novella's violence, not wanting it to appear "exploitative or repetitive". Unlike in the novella, animosity toward Jews was not explicitly displayed by the characters in the film. The novella's dream sequence in which Bowden rapes a sixteen-year-old Jewish virgin as a laboratory experiment under Dussander's guidance was replaced by the film's dream sequence in which Bowden sees three shower-gas chamber scenes unfold. Reduced in the film was Todd's encounter with the schoolgirl Betty (named Becky in the film). In the novella, he dreams of Betty as a concentration camp inmate whom he can rape and torture. In the film, he has a brief encounter with Becky where he finds himself unable to perform sexually.

In the novella, Bowden's high school counselor Edward French confronts the student with suspicions that Dussander is not really Bowden's grandfather, and Bowden murders French in cold blood. Bowden then embarks on a shooting spree from a tree overlooking a freeway, which results in his death five hours later. Singer felt unable to accomplish King's ending, "I told [King] the ending reads so beautifully. I could never measure up to it; I would have killed it." In the film, Bowden intimidates French, who suspects Dussander's false relationship to the student, by threatening to destroy him with "rumor and innuendo". Stanley Wiater, author of The Complete Stephen King Universe, wrote, "As depicted on screen, Todd is much more consciously evil, in his way, than in the book. This switch, while making the ending less brutal, perhaps, achieves the impossible: it also makes the ending even darker."

== Release and reception ==
Bryan Singer previewed Apt Pupil at the Museum of Tolerance's L.A. Holocaust Center to assess feedback from rabbis and others about referencing the Holocaust. With a positive response, the director proceeded with the film's release. Apt Pupil was originally scheduled to be released in February 1998, but the film's distributor moved the release date to autumn, feeling that it belonged "alongside other more serious-minded films". It premiered at the Venice Film Festival in September 1998. It was then commercially released on October 23, 1998 in 1,448 theaters in the United States and Canada, grossing $3.6 million on its opening weekend and placing ninth at the weekend box office. The film went on to gross $8.9 million in the United States and Canada. Apt Pupil was considered a critical and commercial disappointment. The film was less successful than Singer's previous film The Usual Suspects, with critics describing it as "a somewhat disturbing movie that works as a suspenseful thriller, yet isn't completely satisfying".

Roger Ebert, reviewing for the Chicago Sun-Times, wrote that the film was well-made by Bryan Singer and well-acted, especially by Ian McKellen, but that "the film reveals itself as unworthy of its subject matter". The critic felt that the offensive material lacked a "social message" or an "overarching purpose" and found the film's later scenes to be "exploitative". Janet Maslin of The New York Times applauded the production value of Bryan Singer's direction, liking Newton Thomas Sigel's "handsomely shot" cinematography and John Ottman's "stunningly edited" work. Maslin wrote of McKellen and Renfro's performances, "Both actors play their roles so trickily that tensions escalate until the horror grows unimaginatively gothic." The critic felt that as the film approached the end, "the story's cleverness is noticeably on the wane".

Kathleen Murphy of Film Comment called McKellen and Renfro's performances "skin-crawling" but felt that it did not complete the film. Murphy wrote, "[The acting] makes you wish Apt Pupil had the art and the courage actually to look into evil's awful abyss." The critic perceived that Apt Pupil came off as a conventional horror film, that it had Stephen King's "characteristically unsavory" touches, and that Singer's "inept" direction "trivialize[s] the characters and the subject matter". Lisa Schwarzbaum of Entertainment Weekly saw Apt Pupil as not a "hunted-Nazi thriller" nor a "full-tilt Stephen King thriller", but as a "student-teacher parable" that comes off as "disturbing". Schwarzbaum felt that Singer told "a story with serious moral resonance", though patience was needed to get past Singer's "more baroque cinematic touches" of "visual furbelows ... and aural gimmicks" in the film, citing as examples Dussander watching Mr. Magoo on television or the musical piece Liebestod being blared during a bloody scene.

Jay Carr of The Boston Globe called Apt Pupil "most compelling for its moral dimension", enjoying the "duet between Renfro's smooth-cheeked latter-day Faust and McKellen's reawakened Mephistopheles". While Carr found the film's framework to be realistic, he noted the change of pace, "Perhaps sensing a narrative slackening and a smothering claustrophobia ... 'Apt Pupil' veers into melodramatic devices that yank the film out of its disquieting amorality and turn it into something much more ordinary and mundane." The critic concluded, "It maintains a bleak integrity by not pretending to arrive at remorse. Never is there any discussion." Michael Wilmington of the Chicago Tribune described Apt Pupil as "a good shocker that misses the ultimate horror", finding the film's weakness to be the "contrived" bond between Dussander and Bowden. Wilmington called the plot "overly slick", asking, "How can Todd not only conveniently find a Nazi war criminal in his hometown but also instantly coerce and control him?"

== Accolades ==
Renfro won the Best Actor award at the Tokyo International Film Festival for his performance in Apt Pupil. Ian McKellen won a Critics' Choice Award for Best Actor and a Florida Film Critics Circle Award for Best Actor for his performance in both Apt Pupil and Gods and Monsters. The Academy of Science Fiction, Fantasy & Horror Films awarded a Saturn Award for Best Supporting Actor to McKellen for his performance and awarded the film a Saturn Award for Best Horror Film of 1998.

== Lawsuit ==
For Apt Pupil, Bryan Singer filmed a shower scene in which Todd Bowden, saturated with horrific stories from Kurt Dussander, imagines his fellow showering students as Jewish prisoners in gas chambers. The scene was filmed at Eliot Middle School in Altadena, California on April 2, 1997, and two weeks later, a 14-year-old extra filed a lawsuit alleging that Singer forced him and other extras to strip naked for the scene. Two boys, 16 and 17 years old, later supported the 14-year-old's claim. The boys claimed trauma from the experience, seeking charges against the filmmakers including infliction of emotional distress, negligence, and invasion of privacy. Allegations were made that the boys were filmed for sexual gratification. The local news shows and national tabloid programs stirred the controversy. A sexual crimes task force that included local, state, and federal personnel investigated the incident. The Los Angeles District Attorney's office determined that there was no cause to file criminal charges, stating, "The suspects were intent on completing a professional film as quickly and efficiently as possible. There is no indication of lewd or abnormal sexual intent." The scene was filmed again with adult actors so the film could finish on time.

The Hollywood Reporter wrote in 2020, "Singer was one of several defendants named in the suits, which reportedly were settled for an undisclosed sum, with the plaintiffs bound by confidentiality agreements."

== See also ==
- List of Holocaust films
- List of American films of 1998

Nazi Next Door films

- Marathon Man (1976)
- The Boys from Brazil (1978)
- Hôtel Terminus: The Life and Times of Klaus Barbie (1987)
- Music Box (1989)
