= Different Seasons =

1982 collection of Stephen King novellas

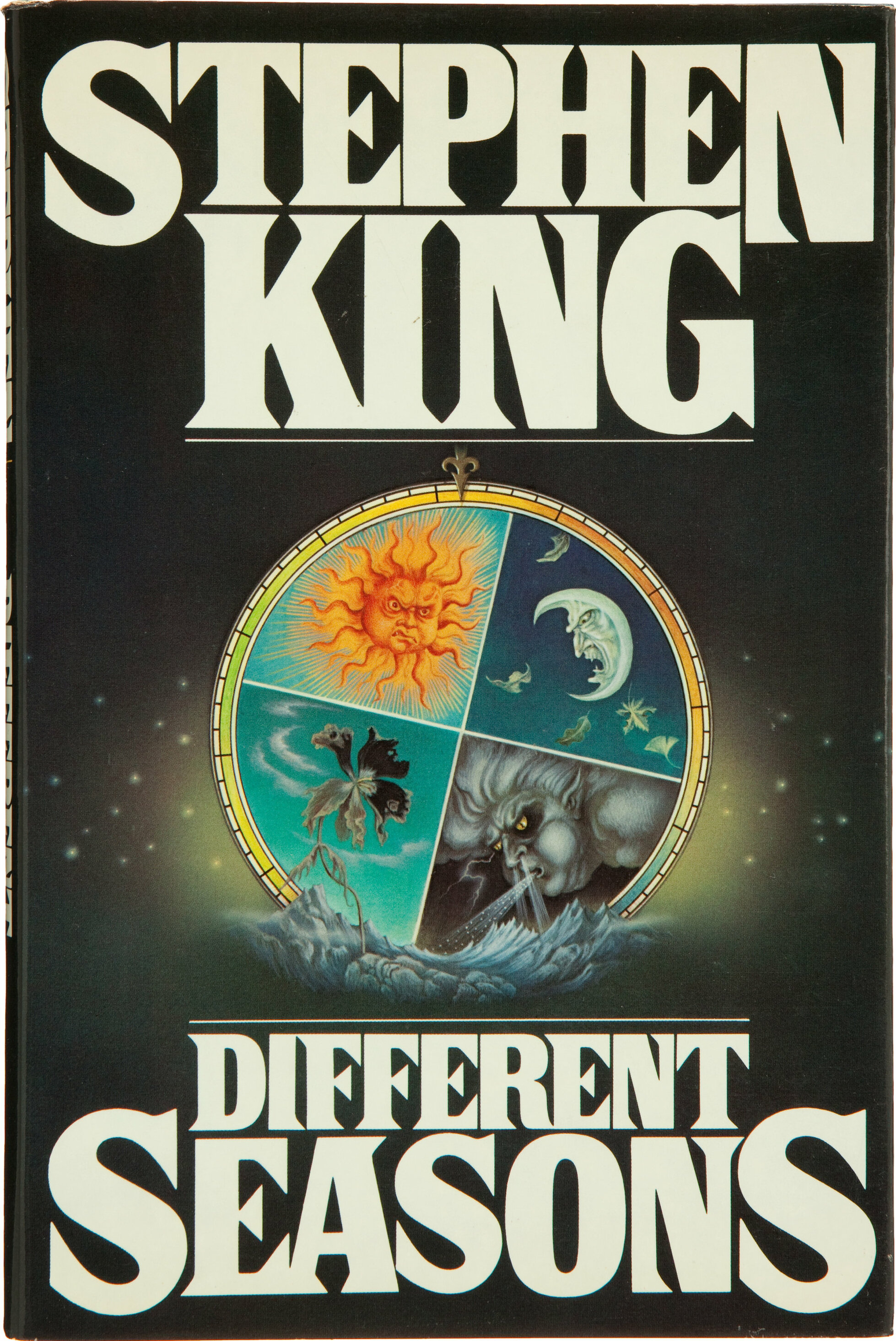
- First edition
- Author: Stephen King
- Cover artist: Kinuko Y. Craft
- Language: English
- Publisher: Viking Press
- Publication date: August 27, 1982
- Publication place: United States
- Media type: Print (hardcover)
- Pages: 527
- ISBN: 978-0-670-27266-2
- Preceded by: Night Shift
- Followed by: Skeleton Crew

Different Seasons (1982) is a collection of four Stephen King novellas with a more dramatic bent, rather than the horror fiction for which King is famous. The four novellas are tied together via subtitles that relate to each of the four seasons. The collection is notable for having three out of its four novellas turned into Hollywood films, one of which, The Shawshank Redemption, was nominated for the 1994 Academy Award for Best Picture, and another, Stand by Me, was nominated for the 1986 Academy Award for Best Adapted Screenplay.

== Novellas ==
Name	Subtitle	Film adaptation
Rita Hayworth and Shawshank Redemption	Hope Springs Eternal	The Shawshank Redemption (1994)
Apt Pupil	Summer of Corruption	Apt Pupil (1998)
The Body	Fall from Innocence	Stand by Me (1986)
The Breathing Method	A Winter's Tale	N/A

== Title ==
At the ending of the book, there is also a brief afterword, which King wrote on January 4, 1982. In it, he explains why he had not previously submitted the novellas (each written at a different time) for publication. Early in his career, his agents and editors expressed concern that he would be "written off" as someone who only wrote horror. However, his horror novels turned out to be quite popular and made him much in demand as a novelist. Conversely, the novellas, which did not deal (primarily) with the supernatural, were very difficult to publish as there was not a mass market for "straight" fiction stories in the 25,000- to 35,000-word format. Thus, King and his editor conceived the idea of publishing the novellas together as "something different", hence the title of the book.

== Plot summaries ==
=== Hope Springs Eternal – "Rita Hayworth and Shawshank Redemption" ===
The story takes place in Maine at Shawshank State Penitentiary and is told from the first-person perspective of prisoner Ellis “Red” Reddings as he recounts his time in prison. His writings mainly focus on his friend and fellow prisoner, Andy Dufresne. Red opens by describing himself and why he was in prison: he staged a car accident in 1938 intended only to kill his wife after taking out a large life insurance policy on her, but which also killed his neighbor and her child as his wife had offered to give them a ride, thus leading to him being condemned to serve three life sentences. Red’s explains that he is “the guy who can get it for you” in Shawshank as his various connections allow him to smuggle contraband into the prison.

Red describes meeting Andy for the first time in 1948, one year after Andy was convicted of murdering his wife and her lover, a well-to-do golfer. Andy asks Red to get him a rock hammer, stating that he is a “rock hound.” A year later, Andy asks Red to get him a large poster of Rita Hayworth. Red also details the various encounters Andy faces during his time in prison, including his initial trouble with one of the prison’s rape gangs. Red insinuates that Andy eventually paid off the prison guards to beat up the leader of the gang, Bogs Diamond. Along with this, Red describes how Andy had become somewhat of a financial advisor to many of the prison’s guards and higher-ups through his encounter with prison guard, Byron Hadley, in which Andy advises him to use a loophole to avoid the taxes on an inheritance he recently received. Along with helping prison guards with their tax returns, loans, and any other financial advice, Andy begins to help some of the higher-ups with money laundering.

Andy eventually begins working as the prison’s librarian and expands it past its original location, a small room that was originally used to store paint. It is during this time that he meets prisoner fellow Tommy Williams. Tommy tells Andy that his former cellmate at the previous prison he was in, a man by the name of Elwood Blatch, had confided in Tommy that he had been the one who killed Andy’s wife and her lover. Andy uses this information to go to the prison’s warden, Samuel Norton, as a means to try to gain his freedom. Norton denies Andy’s request, stating he is far too valuable as an asset and that he knows too much since he aided the administration in money laundering. Norton sentences Andy to twenty days in solitary confinement and transfers Tommy to a different prison.

Four years after his time in solitary confinement, Andy confronts Red and tells him about his pseudonym, “Peter Stevens." Andy had sold all of his assets to this pseudonym before getting sentenced to prison, stating he had upwards of $370,000 in the bank waiting for him once he got out of prison. Andy shares that he intends to use this money to move to Zihuatanejo, Mexico, and open a small hotel. He implies that he wishes for Red to come with him when that day ever comes. On March 12, 1975, eight years after Andy tells Red about his pseudonym, Andy is missing from his cell. They discover that he had used his rock hammer to create a hole in the prison wall through which he could escape and had hidden it behind the poster he hung up in his cell. Nine months after his escape, Red receives a blank postcard from McNary, Texas, and assumes that it is from Andy and that he has successfully crossed the border.

In 1977, Red was released on parole. He finds a note addressed to him from “Peter Stevens” inviting Red to join him in Zihuatanejo along with $1,000. The story ends with Red deciding to join Andy and sharing his hope for the future.

=== Summer of Corruption – "Apt Pupil" ===
The story is set in Los Angeles in 1974 and is told in the third-person perspective. The story follows Todd Bowden from the age of thirteen up until he graduates high school. The story opens with Todd as he arrives at the doorstep of an elderly German immigrant, named Auther Denker, and accuses him of being Nazi war criminal Kurt Dussander. Dussander does little to deny his identity and Todd insists that Dussander tells Todd about the crimes he had committed lest he turn him in to the authorities. Todd then begins to go to Dussander’s house every day demanding to know the details of all of his crimes in excruciating detail.

As months go by, Todd begins to have nightmares and his grades begin to slip. He resorts to forging his report card before giving it to his parents. Eventually, his school’s guidance counselor Ed French, requests to meet with Todd and his parents to discuss his failing grades. Todd, desperate for his parents not to find out convinces Dussander to pretend to be his grandfather and accompany him to the meeting. Now aware of his failing grades, Dussander uses this as blackmail to force Todd into studying during their meetings. Todd’s grades begin to improve and he decides he no longer has any need of Dussander and plots to kill him and make it seem like it was an accident. Todd tells Dussander that should anything happen to him he has a friend he gave a letter to listing all of Dussander’s crimes that will be mailed to the police upon his death. Dussander realizes Todd’s plot, however, and tells him that he wrote his statement and placed it in a safe deposit box so that if Todd were to kill him, the authorities would know he was willingly conversing with a war criminal. These statements prevent them from killing each other despite both of them lying about the ‘evidence’ they had on one another.

As the months go by, Todd begins killing homeless people on the street as it helps alleviate his nightmares. Years pass and Todd visits Dussander less and less. Todd greatly enjoys the thrill associated with killing, stating that he believes it to be better than sex. However, he is uncertain if he dislikes sex in comparison to the thrill of killing simply because he enjoys killing more or if sex with his girlfriend is unenjoyable because she is Jewish. Similarly to Todd, Dussander has also begun to have nightmares and kills homeless people to relieve them, burying the bodies in his basement.

One night when Dussander is burying one of his victims he has a heart attack. He asks Todd to clean up and hide the body before calling an ambulance and being sent to the hospital. While in the hospital Dussander shares a room with holocaust survivor Morris Heisel. Heisel does not immediately remember Dussander’s identity but makes it known that he remembers his face. Todd visits the hospital a few days later to tell Dussander that he would never visit him again, only for Dussander to tell Todd to be more careful with his murders.

Eventually, Heisel realizes “Mr. Denker”’s true identity as the commandant of the concentration camp where his wife and daughter were killed. Heisel contacts a Nazi hunter named Weiskopf to visit Dussander and tell him he had been found out. After the encounter, Dussander steals drugs from the hospital dispensary and commits suicide. Weiskopf along with police detective Richler then interviews Todd because of his connections to Dussander.

Later, French meets with Todd’s real grandfather and realizes that he had been lying when he said that Dussander had been his grandfather. This leads French to check Todd’s report cards and discover that Todd had been tampering with them. French confronts Todd, showing him a newspaper clipping describing Dussander’s death and his true identity. Todd kills French in retaliation. Afterward, Todd goes on a killing spree and is eventually killed by police five hours later.

=== Fall From Innocence – "The Body" ===
Gordon "Gordie" Lachance reminisces about his childhood in Castle Rock, Maine. At that time, Gordie's elder brother Dennis (also known as Denny), whom his parents favored, had recently died, leaving Gordie's parents too depressed to pay much attention to him. In 1960, Gordie and his three friends − Chris Chambers, Teddy Duchamp and Vern Tessio − learn that a gang of hooligans led by John "Ace" Merrill have accidentally discovered the dead body of a missing boy named Ray Brower, who was hit by a train. Because the gang found the body while driving a stolen car, they elected not to report the body to the police. The boys get the idea to find the body "officially" so that they may become famous. In preparation for the expedition, Chris steals a gun from his father, and the boys tell their parents they are camping out in a nearby field.

Over the course of the narrative, the adult Gordie recalls his first published story, Stud City, about the life of a simple man named Edward "Chico" May whose older brother also died. He has a girlfriend, Jane, who he does not have particularly strong feelings for. Chico knows that his stepmother Virginia slept with his brother before he died, but he hesitates to tell his father about it. One day, Chico has a fight with his father over Virginia and leaves the house.

Along the way, the boys trespass at the town dump and are chased by Chopper, the dump custodian Milo Pressman's dog. Teddy gets into a verbal skirmish with Milo when the latter insults Teddy's father (a WW2 veteran who was given a "Section 8" medical discharge for trauma related to the Normandy invasion) by calling him a "loonie". Gordie and Vern are nearly run over by a train while crossing a trestle. While at a resting point, Gordie tells his friends another story, "The Revenge of Lard-Ass Hogan", in which the titular Davie "Lard-Ass" Hogan exacts vengeance on the town locals for ridiculing his wide girth by downing a whole bottle of castor oil before engaging in the town's annual pie-eating contest and vomiting on the previous year's champion, which causes a chain reaction that nauseates the entire audience. The next morning, the boys stumble upon a small pond and partake in a swim, but jump out in horror when they find that the pond is teeming with leeches.

After a thunderstorm, the boys finally find the dead body. The body of Ray Brower was discovered to be mangled by the train while attempting to escape the locomotive's path. Ace's gang arrives shortly after. During an argument, Chris pulls the gun on the gang and forces them to leave, but Ace promises reprisals. Tired, depressed and fearing retaliation, the boys decide there is nothing more to be done with the body and return home. Subsequently, one of the gang members reports the body as an anonymous tip, and the gang members severely beat all four boys. The four friends eventually drift apart, but Gordie and Chris remain close. Chris decides to prepare for higher education, and with Gordie's support, they both graduate from the University of Maine. In the present day, Gordie tells how he learned of Chris's death after he was fatally stabbed while trying to stop an argument in a restaurant, about the deaths of Vern and Teddy (in a house fire and car accident respectively), about his successful writing career, and about his recent visit to Castle Rock, where he found that Ace has become an alcoholic and a worker at the town's mill.

=== A Winter's Tale – "The Breathing Method" ===
David, the narrator of the frame tale, is a middle-aged Manhattan lawyer. At the invitation of a senior partner, he joins a strange gentlemen's club where the members, in addition to reading, chatting and playing billiards and chess, like to tell stories, some of which range into the bizarre and macabre.

One Thursday before Christmas, the elderly physician Dr. Emlyn McCarron tells a story about an episode that took place early in his long and varied career: that of a patient, Sandra Stansfield, who was determined to give birth to her illegitimate child, no matter what, despite financial problems and social disapproval. McCarron comes to admire her bravery and humor, and the implication is that he has even fallen a bit in love with her.

Sandra masters Dr. McCarron's unusual (for the 1930s) breathing method intended to help her through childbirth. However, when she goes into labor and is on the way to the hospital on an icy winter night, her taxi crashes and she is decapitated. McCarron arrives at the crash site and realizes that Sandra is somehow still alive. Her lungs in her decapitated body are still pumping air, as her head, some feet away, is working to sustain the breathing method so that the baby can be born. McCarron manages to deliver the infant alive and well.

On a sweet although haunting end note, Sandra whispers "Thank you"—her severed head mouthing the words, which are distortedly heard from the throat jutting from her headless body. McCarron is able to tell her that her baby is a boy and to see that she has registered this before she dies. McCarron and his office nurse pay for the woman's burial, for she has no one else.

The child is adopted, and despite the confidential nature of adoption records, McCarron is able to keep track of him over the years. When the man is "not yet 45", and an accomplished college professor, McCarron arranges to meet him socially. "He had his mother's determination, gentlemen," he tells the club members, "and his mother's hazel eyes."

== In popular culture ==
The second episode of the seventh season of the 2016 American television series Billions featured a copy of the book in the possession of a prisoner character played by Clancy Brown. Brown played a sadistic prison guard in the 1994 movie adaptation of Rita Hayworth and Shawshank Redemption.

== See also ==
- 1982 in literature
- Stephen King short fiction bibliography
