= Stephen King =

American author (born 1947)

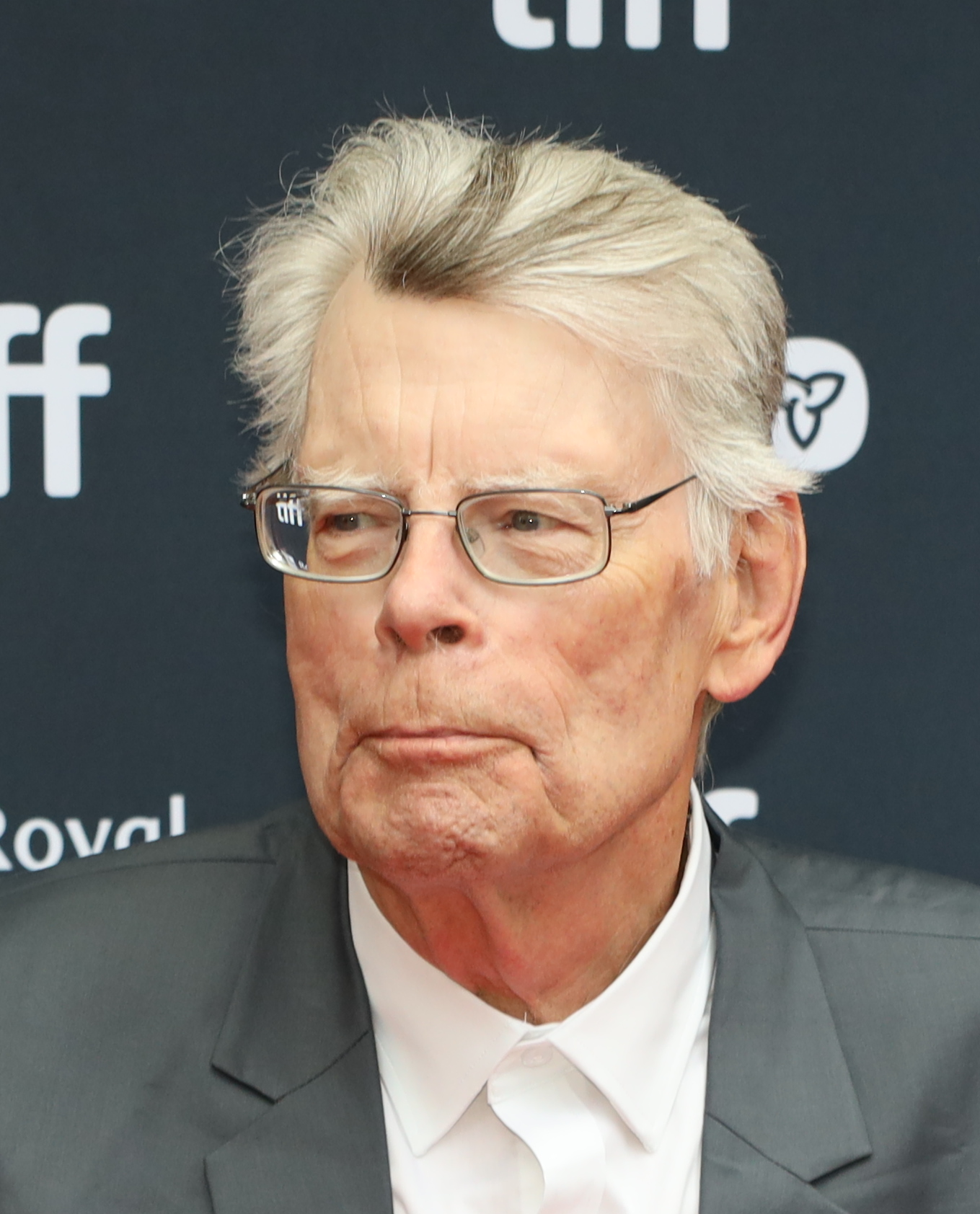
- King in 2024
- Born: Stephen Edwin King; September 21, 1947 (age 79); Portland, Maine, U.S.
- Education: University of Maine (BA)
- Occupation: Author
- Spouse: Tabitha Spruce (m. 1971)
- Children: 3, including Joe and Owen
- Writing career
- Pen name: Richard Bachman; John Swithen; Beryl Evans
- Period: 1967–present
- Genres: Horror; fantasy; supernatural fiction; drama; gothic; genre fiction; dark fantasy; post-apocalyptic fiction; crime fiction; suspense; thriller; children's fiction
- Website: stephenking.com

Stephen Edwin King (born September 21, 1947) is an American author. Dubbed the "King of Horror", he is widely known for his horror fiction and has also explored other genres, among them suspense, crime, science-fiction, fantasy, and mystery. In a career spanning six decades, he has written approximately 200 short stories, most of which have been published in collections.

His debut, Carrie (1974), established him in horror, and Different Seasons (1982), a collection of four novellas, was his first major departure from the genre. Among the films adapted from King's fiction are Carrie (1976), The Shining (1980), The Dead Zone (1983), Stand by Me (1986), Misery (1990), The Shawshank Redemption (1994), Dolores Claiborne (1995), The Green Mile (1999), It (2017), The Life of Chuck (2024) and The Long Walk (2025). He has published under the pseudonym Richard Bachman and has co-written works with other authors, notably his friend Peter Straub and sons Joe Hill and Owen King. He has also written nonfiction, notably Danse Macabre (1981) and On Writing: A Memoir of the Craft (2000).

Among other awards, King has won the O. Henry Award for "The Man in the Black Suit" (1994) and the Los Angeles Times Book Prize for Mystery/Thriller for 11/22/63 (2011). He has also won honors for his overall contributions to literature, including the 2003 Medal for Distinguished Contribution to American Letters, the 2007 Grand Master Award from the Mystery Writers of America and the 2014 National Medal of Arts. Joyce Carol Oates called King "a brilliantly rooted, psychologically 'realistic' writer for whom the American scene has been a continuous source of inspiration, and American popular culture a vast cornucopia of possibilities."

== Early life and education ==
King was born in Portland, Maine, on September 21, 1947. His father, Donald Edwin King, a traveling vacuum salesman after returning from World War II, was born in Indiana with the surname Pollock, changing it to King as an adult. King's mother was Nellie Ruth King (née Pillsbury). His parents were married in Scarborough, Maine in 1939. They lived with Donald's family in Chicago before moving to Croton-on-Hudson, New York. King's parents returned to Scarborough towards the end of World War II. He is of Scots-Irish descent.

When King was two, his father left the family. His mother raised him and his older brother David by herself, sometimes under great financial strain. They moved from Scarborough and depended on relatives in West De Pere, Wisconsin; Fort Wayne, Indiana; Malden, Massachusetts; and Stratford, Connecticut. When King was 11, his family moved to Durham, Maine, where his mother cared for her parents until their deaths. After that, she became a caregiver in a local residential facility for the mentally challenged.

King says he started writing when he was "about six or seven, just copying panels out of comic books and then making up my own stories ... Film was also a major influence. I loved the movies from the start. So when I started to write, I had a tendency to write in images because that was all I knew at the time." He recalls, "The first movie I ever saw was a horror movie. It was Bambi. When that little deer gets caught in a forest fire, I was terrified, but I was also exhilarated." He recalls showing his mother a story he copied out of a comic book. She responded: "I bet you could do better. Write one of your own." He recalls "an immense feeling of possibility at the idea, as if I had been ushered into a vast building filled with closed doors and had been given the key to open any I liked." King was a voracious reader: "I read everything from Nancy Drew to Psycho. My favorite was The Shrinking Man, by Richard Matheson—I was 8 when I found that."

King asked a bookmobile driver, "Do you have any stories about how kids really are?" She gave him Lord of the Flies, which proved formative: "It was, so far as I can remember, the first book with hands—strong ones that reached out of the pages and seized me by the throat. It said to me, 'This is not just entertainment; it's life or death.'... To me, Lord of the Flies has always represented what novels are for, why they are indispensable." He entered Lisbon High School in Lisbon Falls, Maine, in 1962. He contributed to Dave's Rag, the newspaper his brother printed with a mimeograph machine, and later sold stories to friends. His first independently published story was "I Was a Teenage Grave Robber", serialized over four issues of the fanzine Comics Review in 1965. He was a sports reporter for Lisbon's Weekly Enterprise.

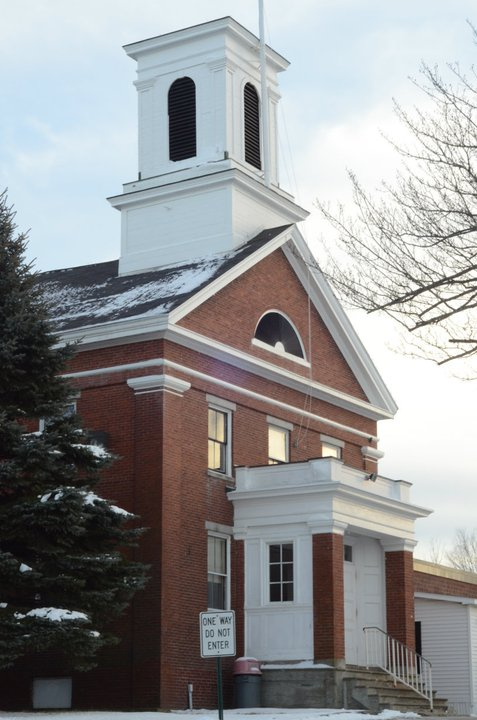
In 1971, King was a teacher at Hampden Academy.

In 1966, King enrolled in the University of Maine on a scholarship. He wrote for the student newspaper, The Maine Campus, and found mentors in professors Edward Holmes and Burton Hatlen. He joined Hatlen's writing workshop, where he fell in love with Tabitha Spruce. King graduated in 1970 with a Bachelor of Arts in English, and his daughter Naomi Rachel was born that year. King and Spruce wed in 1971. He paid tribute to Hatlen, "who first showed me the way to the pool, which he called 'the language pool, the myth-pool, where we all go down to drink.' That was in 1968. I have trod the path that leads there often in the years since, and I can think of no better place to spend one's days; the water is still sweet, and the fish still swim."

== Career ==
=== Beginnings ===
King sold his first professional short story, "The Glass Floor", to Startling Mystery Stories in 1967. After graduating college, King earned a certificate to teach high school. Unable to find a teaching post immediately, he sold short stories to magazines like Cavalier. Many of his early stories were collected in Night Shift (1978). In 1971, King was hired as an English teacher at Hampden Academy. He continued contributing stories to magazines and worked on ideas for novels, including the anti-war novel Sword in the Darkness, still unpublished.

=== 1970s: Carrie to The Dead Zone ===
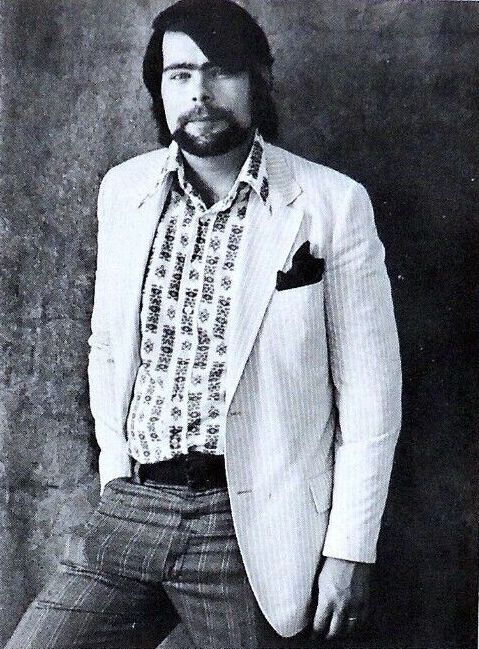
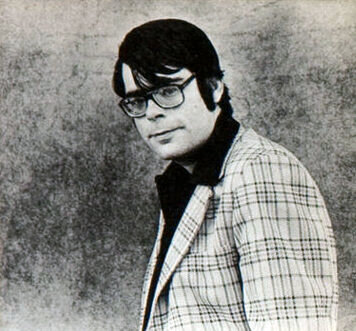
Portraits from the first edition of Carrie (1974) (left) and The Shining (1977) (right)

King recalls the origin of his debut, Carrie (1974): "Two unrelated ideas, adolescent cruelty and telekinesis, came together." It began as a short story intended for Cavalier; King tossed the first three pages in the trash but Tabitha recovered them, saying she wanted to know what happened next. She told him: "You've got something here. I really think you do."

He followed her advice and expanded it into a novel. Carrie is the tale of a telekinetic teen tormented by her peers and by her mother. The New York Times noted that "King does more than tell a story. He is a schoolteacher himself, and he gets into Carrie's mind as well as into the minds of her classmates. He also knows a thing or two about symbolism — blood symbolism especially."

King was teaching Dracula to his students and wondered what would happen if Old World vampires came to a small New England town. This was the germ of 'Salem's Lot (1975), which King called "Peyton Place meets Dracula". King's mother died from uterine cancer around the time 'Salem's Lot was published. Following his mother's death, King and his family moved to Boulder, Colorado. He paid a visit to the Stanley Hotel in Estes Park which provided the basis for The Shining (1977), about an alcoholic writer and his family taking care of a hotel for the winter.

The Kings returned to Auburn, Maine in 1975, where he completed The Stand (1978), an apocalyptic novel about a pandemic and its aftermath. King recalls that it was the novel that took him the longest to write, and "also the one my longtime readers still seem to like the best". In 1977, the Kings, with the addition of Owen Philip, traveled briefly to England. They returned to Maine that fall, and King began teaching creative writing at the University of Maine. The Dead Zone (1979), about an English teacher gifted with second sight, was his first novel set in Castle Rock, Maine. King reflected that with The Dead Zone, "I really hit my stride."

=== 1980s: Danse Macabre to The Dark Half ===
The courses King taught on horror provided the basis for Danse Macabre (1981), which won the Locus Award for Best Non-fiction. His first fiction of the decade was Firestarter (1980), about a girl with pyrokinesis. King dealt with addiction for much of the 1980s and wrote while intoxicated, saying he "barely remembers writing" Cujo (1981). Different Seasons (1982) is a collection of four novellas with a more serious dramatic bent than the horror fiction for which he had become famous. The first three were adapted as films: The Body as Stand by Me (1986); Rita Hayworth and Shawshank Redemption as The Shawshank Redemption (1994); and Apt Pupil as the film of the same name (1998). The fourth, The Breathing Method, won the British Fantasy Award for Best Short Fiction. Alan Cheuse wrote "Each of the first three novellas has its hypnotic moments, and the last one is a horrifying little gem."

He returned to the supernatural with Christine (1983), "A love triangle involving 17-year-old misfit Arnie Cunningham, his new girlfriend and a haunted 1958 Plymouth Fury." He published Pet Sematary, which he had written in the late 1970s, when his family was living near a highway that "used up a lot of animals" as a neighbor put it. His daughter's cat was killed, and they buried it in a pet cemetery built by the local children. King imagined a burial ground beyond it that could raise the dead, albeit imperfectly. He initially found it too disturbing to publish, but resurrected it to fulfill his contract with Doubleday. Cycle of the Werewolf, illustrated by Bernie Wrightson, was "originally intended to be published in the format of a calendar with twelve vignettes, one for each month of the year." King published The Eyes of the Dragon, a high fantasy novel he wrote for his daughter, through his Philtrum Press.

In 1985, King published Skeleton Crew, a book of short fiction including "The Reach" and The Mist. He wanted to move on from horror with a "final exam" that would include "every monster in the world": " Dracula, Frankenstein, Jaws, The Werewolf, The Crawling Eye, Rodan..." These influences coalesced into It (1986), about a group of seven friends who are terrorized by the eponymous entity, which takes the form of its victims' fears and haunts the town of Derry, Maine. He wanted to "bring on all the monsters one last time…and call it It." It won the August Derleth Award in 1987.

The Eyes of the Dragon was widely published in 1987. The book was well received by critics (The New York Times praised its "pellucid" prose) but not some of King's fans, who resented his departure from horror. He followed it with Misery, about a popular writer who is injured in a car wreck and held captive by his self-described "number-one fan". Misery shared the inaugural Bram Stoker Award with Robert R. McCammon's Swan Song. King says the novel's central conflict was a metaphor for addiction. The Tommyknockers is a science fiction novel filled, he says, with metaphors for addiction. After its publication, Tabitha staged an intervention, and he agreed to seek treatment. The Dark Half (1989) is about an author who kills off his literary alter-ego, only to find he's taken on a life of his own. In an author's note, King writes that "I am indebted to the late Richard Bachman."

=== 1990s: Four Past Midnight to Hearts in Atlantis ===
Four Past Midnight (1990) is a collection of four novellas with the common theme of time. Needful Things (1991), his first novel since achieving sobriety, was billed as "The Last Castle Rock Story". In 1992, he published Gerald's Game and Dolores Claiborne, two novels about women loosely linked by a solar eclipse. The latter novel is narrated by the title character in an unbroken monologue; Mark Singer described it as "a morally riveting confession from the earthy mouth of a sixty-six-year-old Maine coastal-island native with a granite-hard life but not a grain of self-pity". King said he based the character of Claiborne on his mother.

King's story "The Man in the Black Suit" ( 1994) was published in the Halloween issue of The New Yorker. The story went on to win the 1996 O. Henry Award. In 1996, King published The Green Mile, the story of a death row inmate, as a serial novel in six parts. It had the distinction of holding the first, fourth, tenth, twelfth, fourteenth, and fifteenth positions on the New York Times paperback-best-seller list simultaneously. Bag of Bones (1998), his first book with Scribner, is about a recently widowed writer. Several reviewers said that it showed King's maturation as a writer; Charles de Lint wrote: "He hasn't forsaken the spookiness and scares that have made him a brand name, but he uses them more judiciously now....The present-day King has far more insight into the human condition than did his younger self, and better yet, all the skills required to share it with us." Bag of Bones won the Bram Stoker Award and August Derleth Award.

In 1999, he published The Girl Who Loved Tom Gordon, about a girl who gets lost in the woods and finds solace in listening to broadcasts of Boston Red Sox games, and Hearts in Atlantis, a book of linked novellas and short stories about coming of age in the 1960s. Later that year, King was hospitalized after being hit by a van. He reflected, "I have nearly been killed by a character out of one of my own novels. It's almost funny." His nurses were "told in no uncertain terms, 'You don't make any Misery jokes.'"

=== 2000s: On Writing to Under the Dome ===
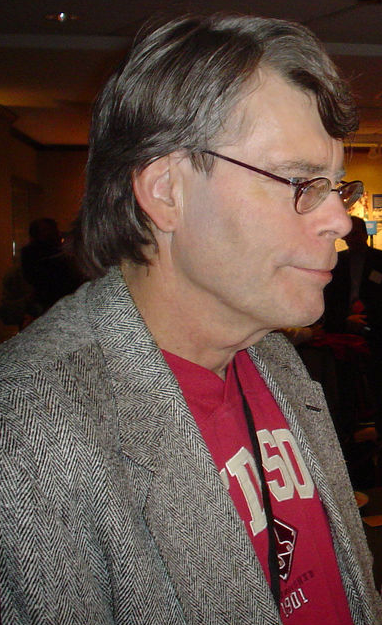
King at the Harvard Book Store, June 6, 2005

On Writing (2000) is a mix of memoir and style manual which The Wall Street Journal called "a one-of-a-kind classic". It emerged out of conversations about language with his friend Amy Tan. He started it before his accident but was unsure of how to finish it. Riding the Bullet (2000) was "the world's first mass e-book, with more than 500,000 downloads". Inspired by its success, he began publishing an epistolary horror novel, The Plant, in online installments using the pay what you want method provided by Amazon.com's Honor System. He suggested readers pay $1 per installment, and said he'd only continue publishing if 75% of readers paid. When The Plant folded, the public assumed that King had abandoned the project because sales were unsuccessful, but King later said he had simply run out of stories. The unfinished novel is still available from King's official site, now free.

From a Buick 8 (2002) was a return to the territory of Christine. The Colorado Kid (2005) was his first book for Hard Case Crime. In 2006, he published Cell, in which a mysterious signal broadcast over cell phones turns users into mindless killers and Lisey's Story, about the widow of a writer. The latter is his favorite of his novels, as "I've always felt that marriage creates its own secret world, and only in a long marriage can two people at least approach real knowledge about each other. I wanted to write about that, and felt that I actually got close to what I really wanted to say." In 2007, King served as guest editor for the annual anthology The Best American Short Stories.

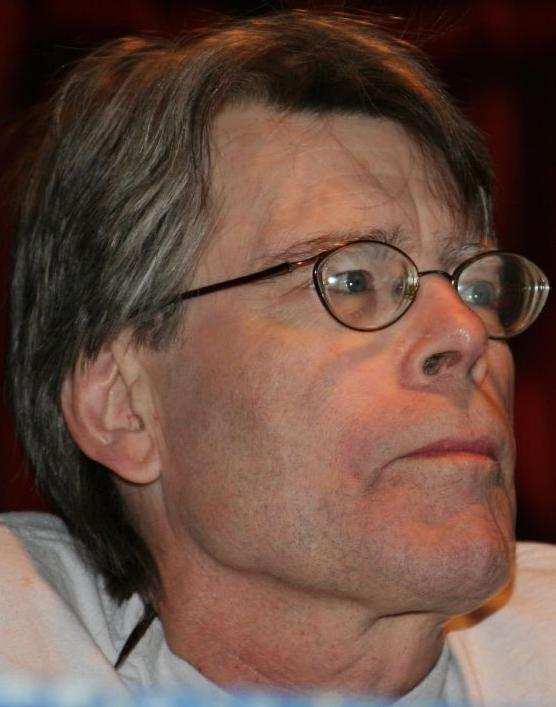
King in 2007

In 2008, King published Duma Key, his first novel set in Florida, and the collection Just After Sunset. In 2009, it was announced he would serve as a writer for Fangoria. Later that year, King's novel Under the Dome debuted at No. 1 on The New York Times Bestseller List. Janet Maslin said of it, "Hard as this thing is to hoist, it's even harder to put down."

=== 2010s: Full Dark, No Stars to The Institute ===
Full Dark, No Stars (2010), is a collection of four novellas with the common theme of retribution. 11/22/63 (2011) is about a time portal leading to 1958, and an English teacher who travels through it to try to prevent the Kennedy assassination. Errol Morris called it "one of the best time travel stories since H. G. Wells". Joyland (2013) was his second book for Hard Case Crime. Later that year, he published Doctor Sleep, a sequel to The Shining.

During his Chancellor's Speaker Series talk at University of Massachusetts Lowell on December 7, 2012, King said that he was writing a crime novel about a retired policeman being taunted by a murderer, with the working title Mr. Mercedes. In an interview with Parade, he confirmed that the novel was "more or less" completed. It was published in 2014 and won the Edgar Allan Poe Award for Best Novel. He returned to horror with Revival, which he called "a nasty, dark piece of work". King announced in June 2014 that Mr. Mercedes was part of a trilogy; the sequel, Finders Keepers, was published in 2015. The third book of the trilogy, End of Watch, was released in 2016. In 2018, he released The Outsider, which features the character Holly Gibney, and the novella Elevation. In 2019, he released The Institute.

=== 2020s: If It Bleeds to present ===
In 2020, King released If It Bleeds, a collection of four novellas. In 2021, he published Later, his third book for Hard Case Crime. In 2022, King released the novel Fairy Tale. Holly, about Holly Gibney was released in September 2023. In November 2023, the short story collection You Like It Darker, featuring twelve stories (seven previously published and five unreleased) was published by Scribner in May 2024. The book debuted at No. 1 on The New York Times fiction best-seller list for the week ending May 25, 2024. King released Never Flinch, featuring Holly Gibney, in 2025.

=== Pseudonyms ===
King published five short novels—Rage (1977), The Long Walk (1979), Roadwork (1981), The Running Man (1982) and Thinner (1984)—under the pseudonym Richard Bachman. He explains: "I did that because back in the early days of my career there was a feeling in the publishing business that one book a year was all the public would accept...eventually the public got wise to this because you can change your name but you can't really disguise your style." Bachman's surname is derived from the band Bachman–Turner Overdrive and his first name is a nod to Richard Stark, the pseudonym Donald E. Westlake used to publish his darker work. The Bachman books are grittier than King's usual fare; King called his alter-ego "Dark-toned, despairing...not a very nice guy." A Literary Guild member praised Thinner as "what Stephen King would write like if Stephen King could really write."

Bachman was exposed as King's pseudonym in 1985 by Steve Brown, a Washington, D.C. bookstore clerk who noticed stylistic similarities between King and Bachman and located publisher's records at the Library of Congress that named King as the author of Rage. King announced Bachman's death from "cancer of the pseudonym". King reflected that "Richard Bachman began his career not as a delusion but as a sheltered place where I could publish a few early books which I felt readers might like. Then he began to grow and come alive, as the creatures of a writer's imagination so frequently do... He took on his own reality, that's all, and when his cover was blown, he died." Originally, King planned Misery to be released under the pseudonym before his identity was discovered.

When Desperation (1996) was released, the companion novel The Regulators was published as a "discovered manuscript" by Bachman. In 2006, King announced that he had discovered another Bachman novel, Blaze, which was published the following year. The original manuscript had been held at the University of Maine for many years and had been covered by numerous King experts. King rewrote the original 1973 manuscript for its publication.

King has used other pseudonyms. In 1972, the short story "The Fifth Quarter" was published under the name John Swithen (a Carrie character) in Cavalier. Charlie the Choo-Choo: From the World of The Dark Tower was published in 2016 under the pseudonym Beryl Evans and illustrated by Ned Dameron. It is adapted from a fictional book central to the plot of King's The Dark Tower III: The Waste Lands.

=== The Dark Tower ===
In the late 1970s, King began a series about a lone gunslinger, Roland, who pursues the "Man in Black" in an alternate universe that is a cross between J. R. R. Tolkien's Middle-earth and the American Wild West as depicted by Clint Eastwood and Sergio Leone in their spaghetti Westerns. The first story, The Dark Tower: The Gunslinger, was initially published in five installments in The Magazine of Fantasy & Science Fiction under the editorship of Edward L. Ferman, from 1977 to 1981. It grew into an eight-volume epic, The Dark Tower, published between 1978 and 2012.

== Collaborations ==
=== Literature ===
King co-wrote three novels with Peter Straub: The Talisman (1984), Black House (2001) and the upcoming Other Worlds Than These. Straub recalls that "We tried to make it as difficult as possible for readers to identify who wrote what. Eventually, we were able to successfully imitate each other's style... Steve threw in more commas or clauses, and I kind of made things more simple in sentence structure. And I tried to make things as vivid as I could because Steve is just fabulous at that, and also I tried to write more colloquially." Straub said the only person who could correctly identify who wrote which passages was a fellow author, Neil Gaiman.

King and the photographer F-Stop Fitzgerald collaborated on the coffee table book Nightmares in the Sky: Gargoyles and Grotesques (1988). He produced an artist's book with designer Barbara Kruger, My Pretty Pony (1989), published in a limited edition of 250 by the Library Fellows of the Whitney Museum of American Art. Alfred A. Knopf released it in a general trade edition.

King co-wrote Throttle (2009) with his son Joe Hill. The novella is an homage to Richard Matheson's "Duel". Their second collaboration, In the Tall Grass (2012), was published in two parts in Esquire. King and his son Owen co-wrote Sleeping Beauties (2018), set in a West Virginia women's prison.

King and Richard Chizmar co-wrote Gwendy's Button Box (2017). A sequel, Gwendy's Magic Feather (2019), was a solo effort by Chizmar. In 2022, King and Chizmar rejoined forces for Gwendy's Final Task.

In 2025, King collaborated with Benjamin Percy on The End Times, a serial novel told in newspapers set in the world of The Stand. King's contributions to the fictional newspaper are bylined as Claudia Inez Bachman.

In 2025, King wrote a retelling of the fairy tale Hansel and Gretel, with illustrations by Maurice Sendak (these were the set and costume designs which Sendak had created for his 1998 production of Engelbert Humperdinck's opera Hänsel und Gretel).

=== Film and television ===
King made his screenwriting debut with George A. Romero's Creepshow (1982), a tribute to EC horror comics. In 1985, he wrote another horror anthology film, Cat's Eye. Rob Reiner, whose film Stand by Me (1986) is an adaptation of King's novella The Body, named his production company Castle Rock Entertainment after King's fictional town. Castle Rock Entertainment would produce other King adaptations, including Reiner's Misery (1990) and Frank Darabont's The Shawshank Redemption (1994).

In 1986, King made his directorial debut with Maximum Overdrive, an adaptation of his story "Trucks". He recalls: "I was coked out of my mind all through its production, and really didn't know what I was doing." It was neither a critical nor a commercial success; King was nominated for a Golden Raspberry for Worst Director, but lost to Prince, for Under the Cherry Moon.

In the 1990s, King wrote several miniseries: Golden Years (1991), The Stand (1994), The Shining (1997) and Storm of the Century (1999). He wrote the miniseries Rose Red (2002); The Diary of Ellen Rimbauer: My Life at Rose Red (2001) was written by Ridley Pearson and published anonymously as a tie-in for the series. He also developed Kingdom Hospital (2004), based on Lars von Trier's The Kingdom.

=== Music and theater ===
King collaborated with Stan Winston and Mick Garris on the music video Michael Jackson's Ghosts (1996). He co-wrote the musical Ghost Brothers of Darkland County (2012) with T. Bone Burnett and John Mellencamp. A soundtrack album was released, featuring Taj Mahal, Elvis Costello and Rosanne Cash, among others.

=== Comics ===
In 1985, King wrote a few pages of the benefit X-Men comic book Heroes for Hope Starring the X-Men. He wrote the introduction to Batman No. 400, an anniversary issue where he expressed his preference for the character over Superman. In 2010, DC Comics premiered American Vampire, a comic book series co-written by King and Scott Snyder and illustrated by Rafael Albuquerque. King wrote the backstory of the first American vampire, Skinner Sweet, in the first five-issues story arc.

== Style, themes, and influences ==
=== Style ===
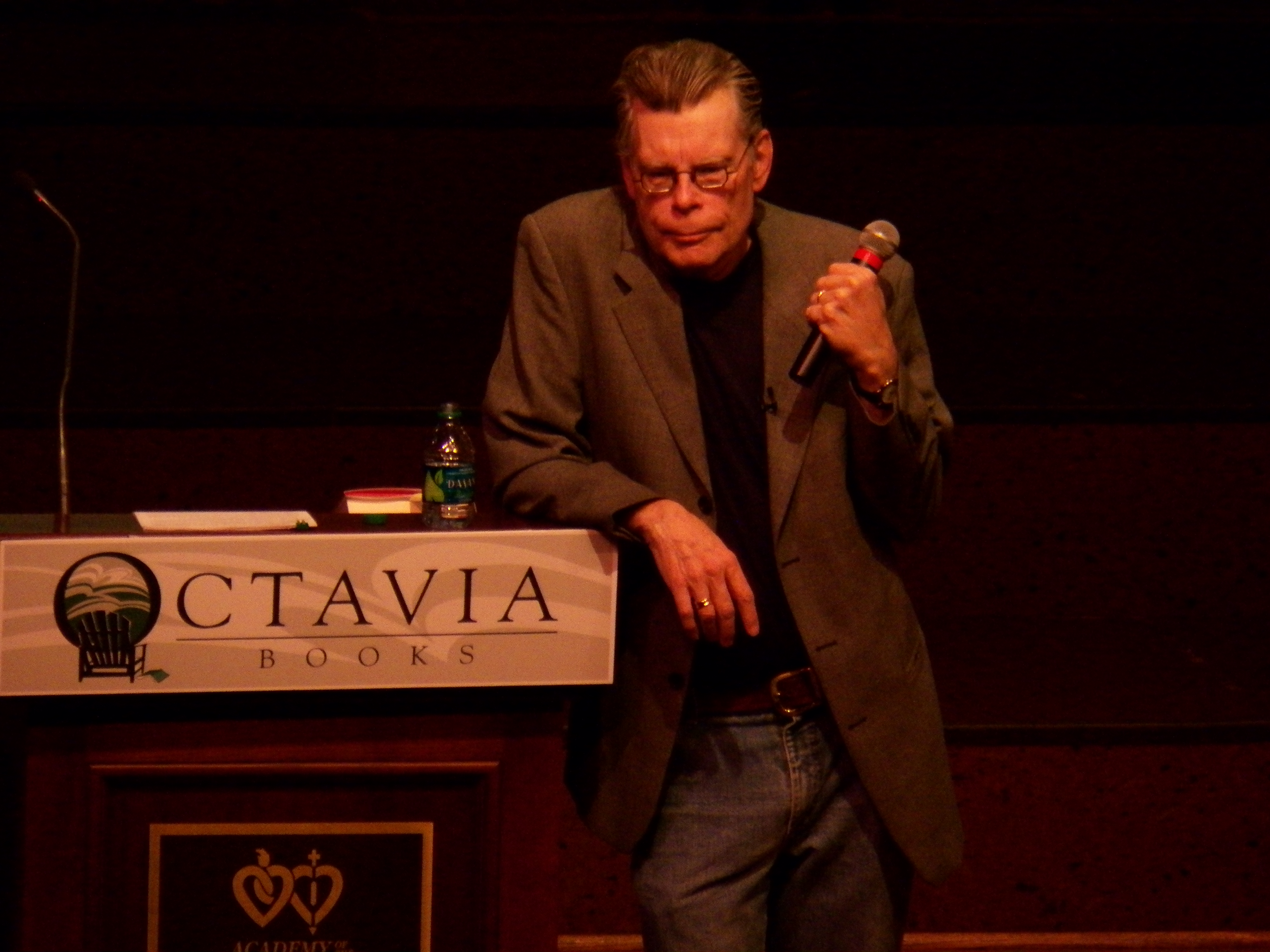
King in 2011

King believes stories "are found things, like fossils in the ground", and that

The writer's job is to use the tools in his or her toolbox to get as much of each one out of the ground intact as possible. Sometimes the fossil you uncover is small, a seashell. Sometimes it's enormous, a Tyrannosaurus Rex with all those gigantic ribs and grinning teeth. Either way, short story or thousand-page whopper of a novel, the techniques of excavation remain basically the same.

King often starts with a "what-if" scenario, asking what would happen if an alcoholic writer was stranded with his family in a haunted hotel (The Shining), or if one could see the outcome of future events (The Dead Zone), or if one could travel in time to alter the course of history (11/22/63). He writes that "The situation comes first. The characters—always flat and unfeatured, to begin with—come next. Once these things are fixed in my mind, I begin to narrate. I often have an idea of what the outcome may be, but I have never demanded a set of characters that they do things my way. On the contrary, I want them to do things their way. In some instances, the outcome is what I visualized. In most, however, it's something I never expected."

Joyce Carol Oates called King "both a storyteller and an inventor of startling images and metaphors, which linger long in the memory." An example of King's imagery is seen in The Body when the narrator recalls a childhood clubhouse with a tin roof and rusty screen door: "No matter what time of day you looked out that screen door, it looked like sunset... When it rained, being inside the club was like being inside a Jamaican steel drum." King writes that "The use of simile and other figurative language is one of the chief delights of fiction—reading it and writing it, as well. [...] By comparing two seemingly unrelated objects—a restaurant bar and a cave, a mirror and a mirage—we are sometimes able to see an old thing in a new and vivid way. Even if the result is mere clarity instead of beauty, I think writer and reader are participating together in a kind of miracle. Maybe that's drawing it a little strong, but yeah—it's what I believe."

=== Themes ===
When asked if fear was his main subject, King said "In every life you get to a point where you have to deal with something that's inexplicable to you, whether it's the doctor saying you have cancer or a prank phone call. So whether you talk about ghosts or vampires or Nazi war criminals living down the block, we're still talking about the same thing, which is an intrusion of the extraordinary into ordinary life and how we deal with it. What that shows about our character and our interactions with others and the society we live in interests me a lot more than monsters and vampires and ghouls and ghosts."

Joyce Carol Oates said that "Stephen King's characteristic subject is small-town American life, often set in fictitious Derry, Maine; tales of family life, marital life, the lives of children banded together by age, circumstance, and urgency, where parents prove oblivious or helpless. The human heart in conflict with itself—in the guise of the malevolent Other. The 'gothic' imagination magnifies the vicissitudes of 'real life' in order to bring it into a sharper and clearer focus." The Body is about coming of age, a theme he has returned to several times, for example in Joyland.

King often uses authors as characters, such as Ben Mears in Salem's Lot, Bobbi Anderson in The Tommyknockers, adult Bill Denbrough in It and Mike Noonan in Bag of Bones. He has extended this to breaking the fourth wall by including himself as a character in three novels of The Dark Tower. This allows King to explore themes of authorship; George Stade writes that Misery "is a parable in chiller form of the popular writer's relation to his audience, which holds him prisoner and dictates what he writes, on pain of death" while The Dark Half "is a parable in chiller form of the popular writer's relation to his creative genius, the vampire within him, the part of him that only awakes to raise Cain when he writes."

Introducing King at the National Book Awards, Walter Mosley said "Stephen King once said that daily life is the frame that makes the picture. His commitment, as I see it, is to celebrate and empower the everyday man and woman as they buy aspirin and cope with cancer. He takes our daily lives and makes them into something heroic. He takes our world, validates our distrust of it and then helps us to see that there's a chance to transcend the muck. He tells us that even if we fail in our struggles, we are still worthy enough to pass on our energies in the survival of humanity." In his acceptance speech for the Medal for Distinguished Contribution to American Letters, King said:

Frank Norris, the author of McTeague, said something like this: "What should I care if they, i.e., the critics, single me out for sneers and laughter? I never truckled, I never lied. I told the truth." And that's always been the bottom line for me. The story and the people in it may be make believe but I need to ask myself over and over if I've told the truth about the way real people would behave in a similar situation... We understand that fiction is a lie to begin with. To ignore the truth inside the lie is to sin against the craft, in general, and one's own work in particular.

=== Influences ===
King says "If you want to be a writer, you must do two things above all: read a lot and write a lot." He emphasizes the importance of good description, which "begins with clear seeing and ends with clear writing, the kind of writing that employs fresh images and simple vocabulary. I began learning my lessons in this regard by reading Chandler, Hammett, and Ross Macdonald; I gained perhaps even more respect for the power of compact, descriptive language from reading T. S. Eliot (those ragged claws scuttling across the ocean floor; those coffee spoons), and William Carlos Williams (white chickens, red wheelbarrow, the plums that were in the ice box, so sweet and so cold)."

King has drawn on fairy and folk tales for inspiration. He recalls the idea of It came to him while crossing a bridge: "I thought of the fairy tale called 'The Three Billy-Goats Gruff' and wondered what I would do if a troll called out from beneath me, 'Who is trip-trapping upon my bridge?' All of a sudden I wanted to write a novel about a real troll under a real bridge. I stopped, thinking of a line by Marianne Moore, something about 'real toads in imaginary gardens,' only it came out 'real trolls in imaginary gardens.'" He has called Richard Matheson "the author who influenced me most". Other influences include Ray Bradbury, Joseph Payne Brennan, James M. Cain, Jack Finney, Graham Greene, Elmore Leonard, John D. MacDonald, Don Robertson and Thomas Williams. He often pays homage to classic horror stories by retelling them in a modern context. He recalls that while writing 'Salem's Lot, "I decided I wanted to try to use the book partially as a form of literary homage (as Peter Straub had done in Ghost Story, working in the tradition of such 'classical' ghost story writers as Henry James, M. R. James, and Nathaniel Hawthorne). So my novel bears an intentional similarity to Bram Stoker's Dracula, and after a while it began to seem I was playing an interesting—to me, at least—game of literary racquet-ball: 'Salem's Lot itself was the ball and Dracula was the wall I kept hitting it against, watching to see how and where it could bounce, so I could hit it again. As a matter of fact, it took some pretty interesting bounces, and I ascribe this mostly to the fact that, while my ball existed in the twentieth century, the wall was very much a product of the nineteenth." Similarly, King's Revival is a modern riff on Mary Shelley's Frankenstein. King dedicated it to "the people who built my house": Shelley, Stoker, H. P. Lovecraft, Clark Ashton Smith, Donald Wandrei, Fritz Leiber, August Derleth, Shirley Jackson, Robert Bloch, Straub and Arthur Machen, "whose short novel The Great God Pan has haunted me all my life".

He provided an appreciation for The Golden Argosy, an anthology of short stories featuring Cather, Hemingway, Faulkner, Fitzgerald, Porter and others: "I first found The Golden Argosy in a Lisbon Falls (Maine) bargain barn called the Jolly White Elephant, where it was on offer for $2.25. At that time I only had four dollars, and spending over half of it on one book, even a hardcover, was a tough decision. I've never regretted it... The Golden Argosy taught me more about good writing than all the writing classes I've ever taken. It was the best $2.25 I ever spent."

== Reception and influence ==
=== Critical reception ===
King has been praised for his use of realistic detail. In A Century of Great Suspense Stories, editor Jeffery Deaver wrote that "While there were many good best-selling writers before him, King, more than anybody since John D. MacDonald, brought reality to genre novels. He has often remarked that 'Salem's Lot was 'Peyton Place meets Dracula'. And so it was. The rich characterization, the careful and caring social eye, the interplay of story line and character development announced that writers could take worn themes such as vampirism and make them fresh again. Before King, many popular writers found their efforts to make their books serious blue-penciled by their editors. 'Stuff like that gets in the way of the story,' they were told. Well, it's stuff like that that has made King so popular, and helped free the popular name from the shackles of simple genre writing. He is a master of masters." Daniel Mendelsohn, reviewing Bag of Bones, wrote that "Stephen King is so widely accepted as America's master of paranormal terrors that you can forget his real genius is for the everyday... This is a book about reanimation: the ghosts', of course, but also Mike's, his desire to re-embrace love and work after a long bereavement that King depicts with an eye for the kind of small but moving details that don't typically distinguish blockbuster horror novels."

Many critics argue that King has matured as a writer. In his analysis of post–World War II horror fiction, The Modern Weird Tale (2001), S. T. Joshi devotes a chapter to King's work. Joshi argues that King's best-known works are his worst, describing them as mostly bloated, illogical, maudlin and prone to deus ex machina endings. Despite these criticisms, Joshi argues that since Gerald's Game (1992), King has been tempering the worst of his writing faults, producing books that are leaner, more believable and generally better written.

In 2003, King was honored by the National Book Awards with a lifetime achievement award, the Medal of Distinguished Contribution to American Letters. Some in the literary community expressed disapproval of the award: Richard E. Snyder, the former CEO of Simon & Schuster, described King's work as "non-literature" and critic Harold Bloom denounced the choice: "The decision to give the National Book Foundation's annual award for 'distinguished contribution' to Stephen King is extraordinary, another low in the shocking process of dumbing down our cultural life. I've described King in the past as a writer of penny dreadfuls, but perhaps even that is too kind. He shares nothing with Edgar Allan Poe. What he is is an immensely inadequate writer on a sentence-by-sentence, paragraph-by-paragraph, book-by-book basis."

King acknowledged the controversy in his acceptance speech: "There are some people who have spoken out passionately about giving me this medal. There are some people who think it's an extraordinarily bad idea. There have been some people who have spoken out who think it's an extraordinarily good idea. You know who you are and where you stand and most of you who are here tonight are on my side. I'm glad for that. But I want to say it doesn't matter in a sense which side you were on. The people who speak out, speak out because they are passionate about the book, about the word, about the page and, in that sense, we're all brothers and sisters. Give yourself a hand." Shirley Hazzard, whose novel The Great Fire was that year's National Book Award winner, responded by criticizing King; she later said that she had never read him.

Roger Ebert wrote that "A lot people were outraged when he was honored at the National Book Awards, as if a popular writer couldn't be taken seriously. But after finding that his book On Writing has more useful and observant things to say about the craft than any book since Strunk and White's The Elements of Style, I have gotten over my own snobbery. King has, after all, been responsible for the movies The Shawshank Redemption, The Green Mile, The Dead Zone, Misery, Apt Pupil, Christine, Hearts in Atlantis, Stand By Me and Carrie... And we must not be ungrateful for Silver Bullet, which I awarded three stars because it was 'either the worst movie made from a Stephen King story, or the funniest', and you know which side of that I'm gonna come down on."

=== Appraisal by other authors ===
Cynthia Ozick said that, upon giving a reading with King, "It dawned on me as I listened to him that, never mind all the best sellers and all the stereotypes — this man is a genuine, true-born writer, and that was a revelation. ... He writes sentences, and he has a literary focus, and his writing is filled with literary history. It's not glib, it's not just contemporary chatter and it's not stupid — that's a bad way to say that something's smart, but that's what I mean."

Joyce Carol Oates praised King's sense of place: "His fiction is famously saturated with the atmosphere of Maine; much of his mostly vividly imagined work—'Salem's Lot, Dolores Claiborne, the elegantly composed story 'The Reach', for instance—is a poetic evocation of that landscape, its history and its inhabitants." She included the latter in the second edition of The Oxford Book of American Short Stories.

Peter Straub compared King favorably to Charles Dickens: "Both are novelists of vast popularity and enormous bibliographies, both are beloved writers with a pronounced taste for the morbid and grotesque, both display a deep interest in the underclass." Straub included King's short story "That Feeling, You Can Only Say What It Is in French" in the Library of America anthology American Fantastic Tales.

David Foster Wallace assigned Carrie and The Stand while teaching at Illinois State University. Wallace praised King's ear for dialogue: "He's one of the first people to talk about real Americans and how they live, to capture real American dialogue in all its, like, foulmouthed grandeur... He has a deadly ear for the way people speak... Students come to me and a lot of them have been led to believe that there's good stuff and bad stuff, literary books and popular books, stuff that's redemptive and commercial shit—with a sharp line drawn between the two categories. It's good to show them that there's a certain amount of blurring. Surface-wise, King's work is a bit televisual, but there's really a lot going on."

=== Influence ===
In an interview, Sherman Alexie recalls the influence of "Stephen King, who was always writing about underdogs, and bullied kids, and kids fighting back against overwhelming, often supernatural forces... The world aligned against them. As an Indian boy growing up on a reservation, I always identified with his protagonists. Stephen King, fighting the monsters."

Lauren Groff says that "I love Stephen King and I owe him more than I could ever express... I love his wild imagination and his vivid scenes, many of which populate my nightmares even decades after I last read the books they're in. But the greatest thing I gleaned most from reading Stephen King is his big-hearted glee, the way he treats writing with gratitude, the way he sees his job not as the source of anguish and pain many writers self-pityingly see it as, but rather as something he's over-the-moon delighted to be lucky enough to do. If I could steal one thing from King, and keep it close to my heart forever, it is his sense of almost-holy glee when it comes to writing."

The hero of Junot Díaz's The Brief Wondrous Life of Oscar Wao dreams of being "the Dominican Stephen King", and Díaz alludes to King's work several times throughout the novel. Colson Whitehead recalls that "The first big book I read was Night Shift by Stephen King, you know, a huge book of short stories. And so for many years I just wanted to write horror fiction." In a talk at Virginia Commonwealth University, Whitehead recalls that in college "I wanted to write the black Shining or the black 'Salem's Lot... Take any Stephen King title and put 'the black' in front of it. That's basically what I wanted to do."

== Views and activism ==
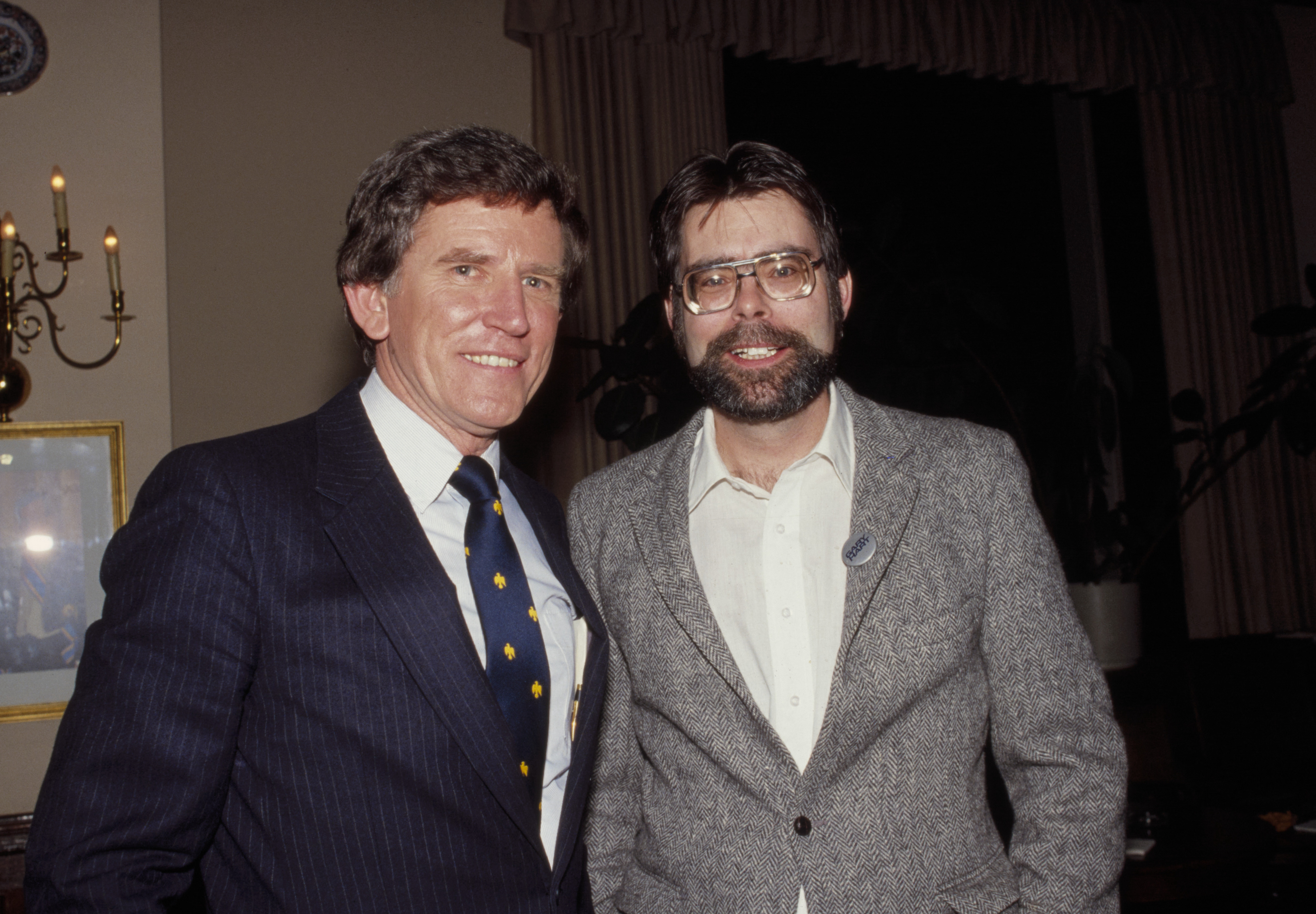
King campaigning for Gary Hart in 1984

King was raised Methodist, but lost falith in organized religion while in high school. While not conventionally religious, he says he does believe in God.

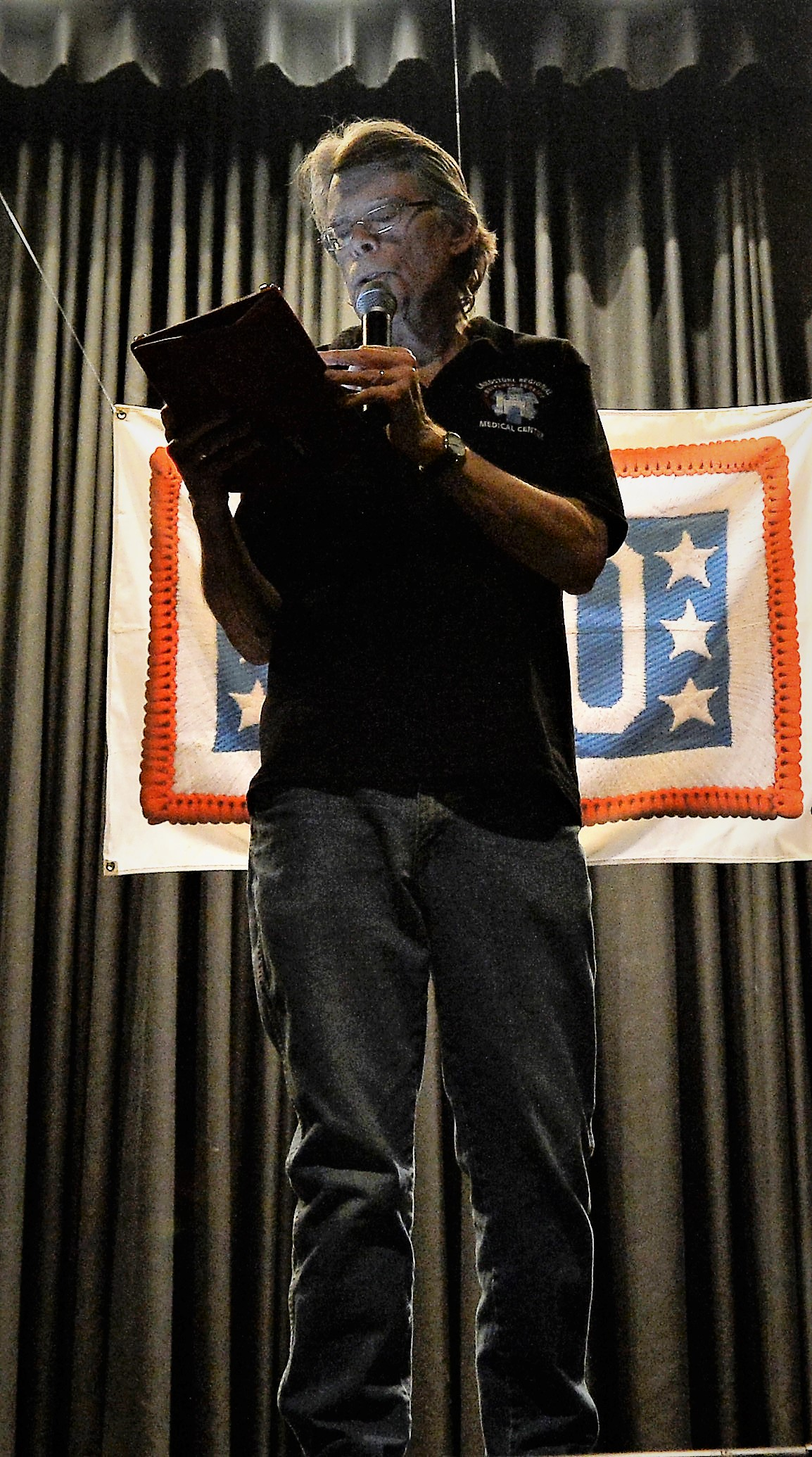
King at the Ramstein Air Base in Germany, 2013

King has supported several Democrats in presidential races. In 1984, King endorsed Gary Hart's presidential campaign. During the 2008 presidential election, King endorsed Barack Obama. In 2016, King was one of many writers who signed a letter condemning the candidacy of Donald Trump. In the 2020 Democratic Party presidential primaries, King endorsed Elizabeth Warren's campaign. Warren eventually suspended her campaign, and King later endorsed Joe Biden's campaign in the 2020 general election. In July 2024, he called on Joe Biden to step down from the presidential race. King went on to endorse Kamala Harris.

On April 30, 2012, King published an article in The Daily Beast calling for rich Americans, including himself, to pay more taxes, citing it as "a practical necessity and moral imperative that those who have received much should be obligated to pay ... in the same proportion". King testified in an August 2022 case brought by the U.S. Justice Department to block a US$2.2 billion merger of Penguin Random House and Simon & Schuster (two of the "Big Five" book publishers). The New York Times credited King's high-profile testimony, which was against his own publisher, with helping to convince presiding judge Florence Y. Pan with ultimately blocking the merger.

In April 2008, King spoke out against HB 1423, a bill pending in the Massachusetts state legislature that would restrict or ban the sale of violent video games to anyone under the age of 18. King argued that such laws allow legislators to ignore the economic divide between the rich and poor and the easy availability of guns, which he believed were the actual causes of violence. In 2013 King published an essay titled Guns, which discusses the gun debate in the wake of the Sandy Hook Elementary School shooting. King called for gun owners to support a ban on automatic and semi-automatic weapons.

In June 2018, King called for the release of the Ukrainian filmmaker Oleg Sentsov, who was jailed in Russia. In July 2022, Stephen King appeared in a video call with the Russian pranksters Vovan and Lexus who played the role of Volodymyr Zelenskyy. In the call, King said "You can always find things about people to pull them down. Washington and Jefferson were slave owners—that doesn't mean they didn't do many good things to the United States of America. There are always people who have flaws, we are humans. On the whole, I think Bandera is a great man, and you're a great man, and Viva Ukraine!" However, King later realized that he was pranked and apologized on Twitter, noting that he was not the only victim and "other victims who fell for these guys include J. K. Rowling, Prince Harry, and Justin Trudeau".

=== Maine politics ===
King endorsed Shenna Bellows in the 2014 U.S. Senate election for the seat held by Republican Susan Collins. King publicly criticized Paul LePage during LePage's tenure as Governor of Maine, referring to him as one of The Three Stooges (with then-Florida governor Rick Scott and then-Wisconsin governor Scott Walker being the other two). He was critical of LePage for incorrectly suggesting in a 2015 radio address that King avoided paying Maine income taxes by living out of state for part of the year. The statement was later corrected by the governor's office, but no apology was issued. King said LePage was "full of the stuff that makes the grass grow green" and demanded that LePage "man up and apologize". LePage declined to apologize to King, stating, "I never said Stephen King did not pay income taxes. What I said was, Stephen King's not in Maine right now. That's what I said."

The attention garnered by the LePage criticism led to efforts to encourage King to run for Governor of Maine in the then-upcoming 2018 gubernatorial election. King said he would not run or serve. King sent a tweet on June 30, 2015, calling LePage "a terrible embarrassment to the state I live in and love. If he won't govern, he should resign." He later clarified that he was not calling on LePage to resign, but to "go to work or go back home". On August 27, 2016, King called LePage "a bigot, a homophobe, and a racist".

=== National politics ===
In March 2026, King commented on X about the ongoing U.S.–Iran conflict. Pointing to rising gasoline prices and American military casualties, he remarked that Republicans would have been "screaming for impeachment" had a Democratic president presided over a similar set of circumstances.

== Philanthropy ==
King subsidizes the National Poetry Foundation, which was directed by his professor and mentor Burton Hatlen, and has endowed scholarships named for another professor, Edward Holmes. Mark Singer also notes Bangor's "most monumental testament to King's philanthropy", the "Shawn T. Mansfield Baseball Complex, dedicated six years ago in memory of the son of a Little League coach and friend of King's who died at fourteen of cerebral palsy." King has stated that he donates approximately $4 million per year "to libraries, local fire departments that need updated lifesaving equipment (Jaws of Life tools are always a popular request), schools, and a scattering of organizations that underwrite the arts". The Stephen and Tabitha King Foundation, chaired by King and his wife, ranks sixth among Maine charities in terms of average annual giving, with over $2.8 million in grants per year, according to The Grantsmanship Center.

In 2002, King, Peter Straub, John Grisham and Pat Conroy organized the Wavedancer Benefit, a public reading to raise funds for the actor and audiobook reader Frank Muller, who had been injured in a motorcycle accident. Their reading was released as an audiobook. In November 2011, the STK Foundation donated $70,000 in matched funding via his radio station to help pay the heating bills for families in need in his hometown of Bangor, Maine, during the winter. In February 2021, King's Foundation donated $6,500 to help children from the Farwell Elementary School in Lewiston, Maine, to publish two novels on which they had been working over the course of several prior years, before being stopped due to the COVID-19 pandemic in Maine.

== Personal life ==
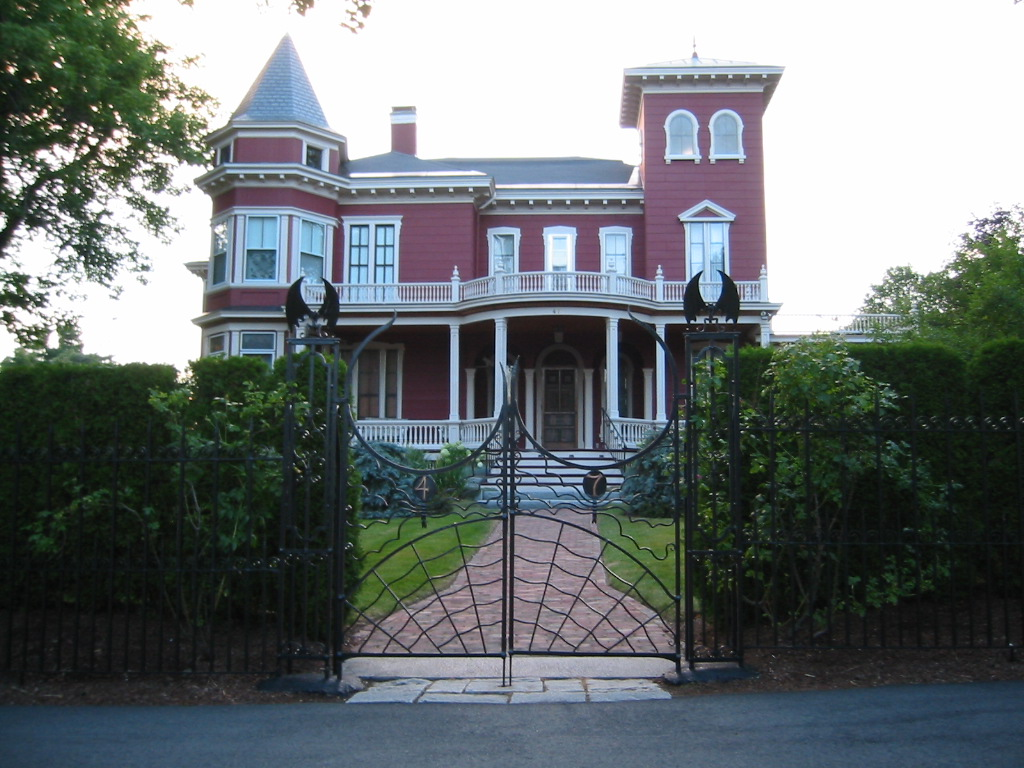
King's home in Bangor

After meeting at the University of Maine, King and Tabitha Spruce married on January 2, 1971. She is also a novelist and philanthropist. They divide their time between three houses: one in Bangor, Maine, one in Lovell, Maine, and for the winter a waterfront mansion located off the Gulf of Mexico in Sarasota, Florida. King's Bangor home has been described as an unofficial tourist attraction, and as of 2019, the couple plan to convert it into a facility housing his archives and a writers' retreat.

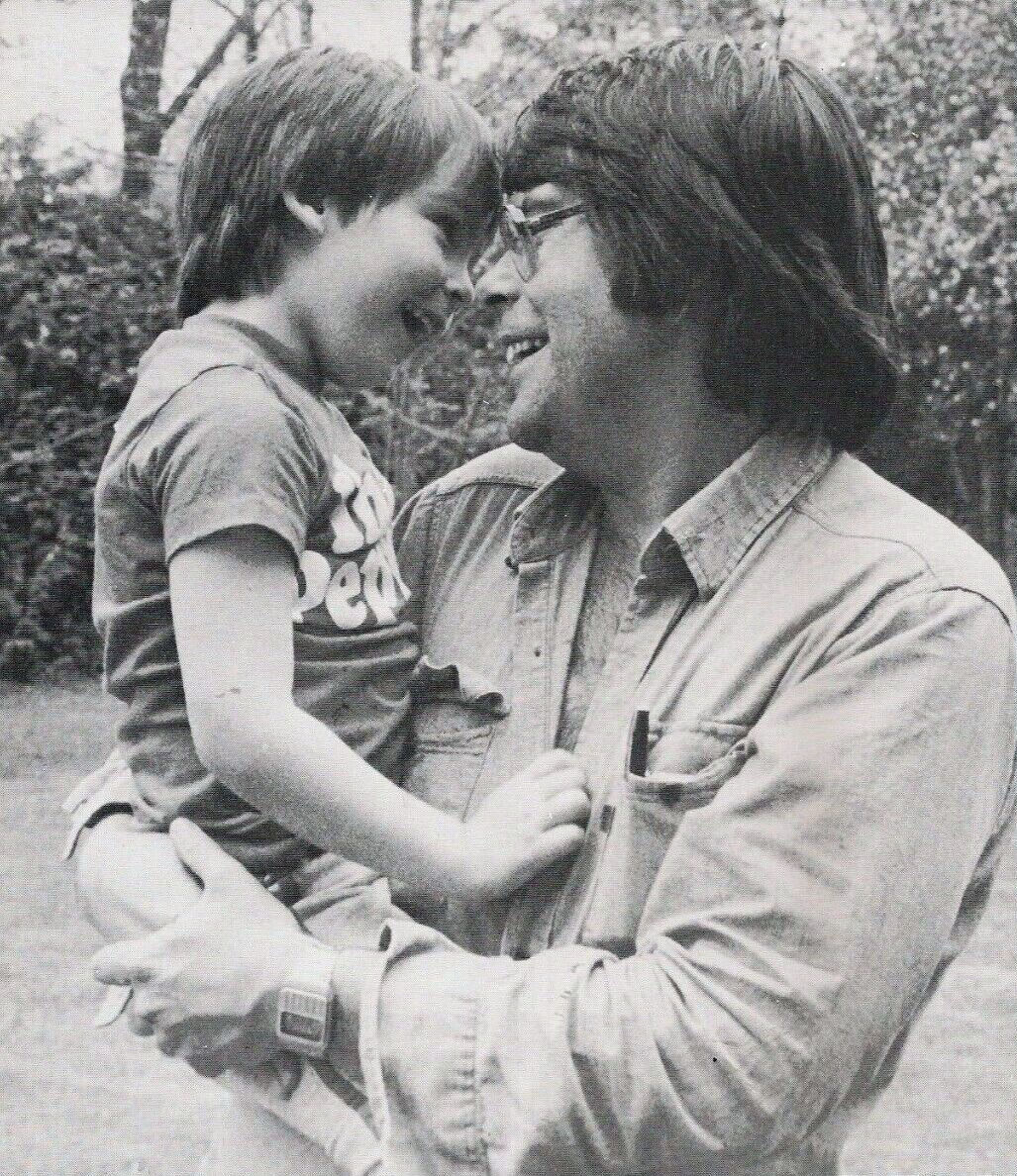
Portrait of Owen and Stephen from the first edition of Different Seasons (1982)

The Kings have three children— Naomi (born June 1, 1970), who is a Unitarian Universalist Church minister in Plantation, Florida, with her partner, Thandeka. Both of King's sons are also professional authors: Owen King (born February 21, 1977) published his first collection of stories, We're All in This Together: A Novella and Stories, in 2005. Joseph Hillström King (born June 4, 1972), who writes as Joe Hill, published his first collection of short stories, 20th Century Ghosts, in 2005.

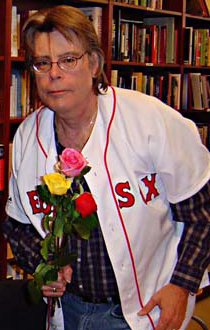
King wearing a Boston Red Sox jersey at a book signing in November 2004

King is a longtime baseball fan, particularly of the Boston Red Sox. In 1990, King published an essay about Owen's Little League team in The New Yorker. King and Stewart O'Nan coauthored Faithful, a chronicle of their correspondence about the 2004 Boston Red Sox season which culminated in their winning the 2004 World Series. The game features in The Girl Who Loved Tom Gordon (1999) and Blockade Billy (2010).

Music, particularly rock, plays a role in much of King's work. He played guitar for the Rock Bottom Remainders, a charity supergroup whose members included Amy Tan, Barbara Kingsolver, Dave Barry, Scott Turow, James McBride, Mitch Albom, Roy Blount, Jr., Matt Groening, Greg Iles, Kathi Kamen Goldmark and other authors. They played at the opening of Cleveland's Rock and Roll Hall of Fame. and released an album, Stranger Than Fiction (1998), under Goldmark's label, Don't Quit Your Day Job Records. King and his band-mates coauthored Midlife Confidential: The Rock Bottom Remainders Tour America With Three Chords and an Attitude (1994) and the e-book Hard Listening: The Greatest Rock Band Ever (of Authors) Tells All (2013).

King and Tabitha own the Zone Corporation, a radio station group established in 1983 to acquire WACZ in Bangor, which was renamed WZON. Two additional stations, WKIT-FM and WNSW in Brewer, were added in 1995; WNSW was quickly closed down. A third station, WDME-FM in Dover-Foxcroft (later renamed WZLO), was acquired in 2001. In December 2024, King announced that the stations would shut down at the end of the year, citing his advancing age and financial losses from the stations. Ahead of the planned closure, King reached a deal to sell WKIT to two Bangor businessmen; WZON and WZLO remain slated for closure.

King remains a voracious reader. In J. Peder Zane's The Top Ten: Authors Pick Their Favorite Books, King chose The Golden Argosy, Adventures of Huckleberry Finn, The Satanic Verses, McTeague, Lord of the Flies, Bleak House, Nineteen Eighty-Four, The Raj Quartet, Light in August and Blood Meridian. In 2022, he provided another list of ten favorite books; Lord of the Flies, Nineteen Eighty-Four and Blood Meridian remained, and he added Ship of Fools, The Orphan Master's Son, Invisible Man, Watership Down, The Hair of Harold Roux, American Pastoral and The Lord of the Rings. He added, "Although Anthony Powell's novels should probably be on here, especially the sublimely titled Casanova's Chinese Restaurant and Books Do Furnish a Room. And Paul Scott's Raj Quartet. And at least six novels by Patricia Highsmith. And what about Patrick O'Brian? See how hard this is to do?" On Desert Island Discs, King's first choice was Bob Dylan's "Desolation Row". His book choice was The Collected Poetry of W. H. Auden.

When asked about his reading habits, King replied, "I'm sort of an omnivore, apt to go from the latest John Sandford to D. H. Lawrence to Cormac McCarthy." When asked what books we'd be surprised to find on his shelves, he answered "Poetry, maybe? I love Anne Sexton, Richard Wilbur, W. B. Yeats. The poetry I come back to again and again are the narrative poems of Stephen Dobyns." When asked who his favorite novelist is, he said "Probably Don Robertson, author of Paradise Falls, The Ideal, Genuine Man and the marvelously titled Miss Margaret Ridpath and the Dismantling of the Universe. What I appreciate most in novels and novelists is generosity, a complete baring of the heart and mind, and Robertson always did that. He also wrote the best single line I've ever read in a novel: Of a funeral he wrote, 'There were that day, o Lord, squadrons of birds.'"

=== Car accident and aftermath ===
On June 19, 1999, at about 4:30 pm, King was walking on the shoulder of Maine State Route 5, in Lovell, Maine. Driver Bryan Edwin Smith, distracted by an unrestrained dog moving in the back of his minivan, struck King, who landed in a depression in the ground about 14 feet (four meters) from the pavement of Route 5. Early reports at the time from Oxford County Sheriff deputy Matt Baker claimed King was hit from behind, and some witnesses said the driver was not speeding, reckless, or drinking.

Smith was later arrested and charged with driving to endanger and aggravated assault. He pleaded guilty to the lesser charge of driving to endanger and was sentenced to six months in county jail (suspended) and had his driving license suspended for a year. In On Writing, King states he was heading north, walking against the traffic. Shortly before the crash took place, a woman in a car, also northbound, passed King first followed by a light blue Dodge van. The van was looping from one side of the road to the other, and the woman told her passenger she hoped "that guy in the van doesn't hit him".

King was conscious enough to give the deputy phone numbers to contact his family but was in considerable pain. He was transported to Northern Cumberland Hospital in Bridgton and then flown by air ambulance to Central Maine Medical Center (CMMC) in Lewiston. His injuries—a collapsed right lung, multiple fractures of his right leg, scalp laceration and a broken hip—kept him at CMMC until July 9. His leg bones were so shattered that doctors initially considered amputating his leg but stabilized the bones in the leg with an external fixator. After five operations in 10 days and physical therapy, King resumed work on On Writing in July, though his hip was still shattered and he could sit for only about 40 minutes before the pain became unbearable.

King's wife got in touch with his lawyer to purchase Smith's van, reportedly to prevent it from appearing on eBay. He recalls: "When I was in the hospital, mostly unconscious, my wife got a lawyer who's just a friend of the family... And she got in touch with him and said, buy it so that somebody else doesn't buy it and decide to break it up and sell it on eBay, on the Internet. And so he did. And for about six months, I did have these, sort of, fantasies of smashing the van up. But my wife—I don't always listen to her the first time, but sooner or later, she usually gets through. And what she says makes more sense than what I had planned. And her thought was that the best thing to do would be to very quietly remove it from this plane of existence, which is what we did."

=== Other media appearances ===
In The Princess Bride, William Goldman writes that Stephen King is "doing the abridgment" of the fictional book Buttercup's Baby. King explains this is an inside joke from Goldman, "who's an old friend. He's done the screen adaptations for a number of my novels. He did Misery, Dreamcatcher and he also did Hearts in Atlantis, and although he's not credited, he worked on Dolores Claiborne as well, so Bill and I go back a long way. I admired his books before I ever met him and as a kind of return tip of the cap, he put me in that book The Princess Bride."

In 1988, Blue Öyster Cult recorded an updated version of its 1974 song "Astronomy"; the single released for radio play featured a narrative intro spoken by King. In 2012, King provided the narration for Shooter Jennings's album Black Ribbons. King was a contestant on Celebrity Jeopardy! in 1995 and 1998. He has made cameos in adaptations of his work, and appeared as the character Bachman on Sons of Anarchy; the name is a nod to his pseudonym Richard Bachman. He voices himself in "Killer Kludge", an episode of the Disney Channel animated series Big City Greens. He cameod in The Simpsons episode "Insane Clown Poppy", where he appears with fellow authors Amy Tan, John Updike and Tom Wolfe at a book fair. King tells Marge he is taking a break from horror to write a biography of Benjamin Franklin.

== Awards and honors ==
- Balrog Award Best Collection / Anthology 1980: Night Shift
- Black Quill Award Best Dark Genre Novel 2009: Duma Key
- Bram Stoker Award, awarded by the Horror Writers Association
  - Best Novel
    - 1987: Misery.
    - 1996: The Green Mile
    - 1998: Bag of Bones
    - 2006: Lisey's Story
    - 2008: Duma Key
    - 2013: Doctor Sleep
  - Best Fiction Collection
    - 1990: Four Past Midnight
    - 2009: Just After Sunset
    - 2011: Full Dark, No Stars
  - Best Short Fiction
    - 1995: "Lunch at the Gotham Café"
    - 2000: "Riding the Bullet"
    - 2011:"Herman Wouk is Still Alive"
  - Best Non-Fiction
    - 2000: On Writing: A Memoir of the Craft
  - 2002: Lifetime Achievement Award
- British Fantasy Awards
  - 1981: Special Award
  - British Fantasy Award for Best Novel:
    - 1982: Cujo
    - 1987: It
    - 1999: Bag of Bones
    - 2005: The Dark Tower VII: The Dark Tower
  - British Fantasy Award for Best Short Fiction
    - 1983: "The Breathing Method"
- Edgar Award for Best Novel, awarded by the Mystery Writers of America
  - 2015: Mr. Mercedes
- Mystery Writers of America 2007 Grand Master Award
- 1982 Hugo Award for Best Related Work: Danse Macabre
- International Horror Guild Awards
  - 1999: Storm of the Century
  - 2003: Living Legend
- Locus Awards
  - 1982: Danse Macabre
  - 1986: Skeleton Crew
  - 1997: Desperation
  - 1999: Bag of Bones
  - 2001: On Writing
- 2003 Medal for Distinguished Contribution to American Letters
- 2014 National Medal of Arts
- National Magazine Awards
  - 2004: "Rest Stop"
  - 2013: "Batman and Robin Have an Altercation"
- 1996 O. Henry Award "The Man in the Black Suit"
- 2005 Quill Award for Faithful (with Stewart O'Nan)
- 2009 Shirley Jackson Award for "Morality"
- Spokane Public Library Golden Pen Award 1986: Golden Pen Award
- University of Maine 1980: Alumni Career Award
- World Fantasy Award
  - 1980: Convention Award
  - 1982: "Do the Dead Sing?"
  - 1995: "The Man in the Black Suit"
  - 2004: Lifetime Achievement
- 1992 World Horror Convention : World Horror Grandmaster
- 1997 Writers For Writers Award, awarded by Poets & Writers Magazine

Carrie was included on the New York Public Library's list of Books of the Century under the category "Pop Culture Mass & Entertainment". In 2008, On Writing was ranked 21st on Entertainment Weekly's list of "The New Classics: The 100 Best Reads from 1983 to 2008". It also made Time's list of the 100 greatest nonfiction books published since the magazine's founding in 1923. Gilbert Cruz wrote, "it's the most practical and unpretentious writer's manual around—as practical and unpretentious as its author, who, yes, just happens to be one of the world's most famous novelists."

11/22/63 (2011) was named one of the five best fiction books of the year in The New York Times: "Throughout his career, King has explored fresh ways to blend the ordinary and the supernatural. His new novel imagines a time portal in a Maine diner that lets an English teacher go back to 1958 in an effort to stop Lee Harvey Oswald and—rewardingly for readers—also allows King to reflect on questions of memory, fate and free will as he richly evokes midcentury America. The past guards its secrets, this novel reminds us, and the horror behind the quotidian is time itself."

== Filmography ==
Year	Title	Director	Executive producer	Writer	Actor	Notes
1981	Knightriders	No	No	No	Yes	Role: Hoagie Man
1982	Creepshow	No	No	Yes	Yes	Role: Jordy Verrill
1983	The Dead Zone	No	No	Yes	No	
1985	Cat's Eye	No	No	Yes	No	
1985	Silver Bullet	No	No	Yes	No	
1986	Maximum Overdrive	Yes	No	Yes	Yes	Role: Man at Bank ATM
1987	Creepshow 2	No	No	No	Yes	Role: Truck Driver
1987	Tales from the Darkside	No	No	Yes	No	1 episode: "Sorry, Right Number"
1989	Pet Sematary	No	No	Yes	Yes	Role: Minister
1991	Golden Years	No	Yes	Yes	Yes	Miniseries, also created by King, role: Bus Driver
1992	Sleepwalkers	No	No	Yes	Yes	Role: Cemetery Caretaker
1994	The Stand	No	Yes	Yes	Yes	Miniseries, role: Teddy Weizak
1995	The Langoliers	No	No	No	Yes	Miniseries, role: Tom Holby
1996	Thinner	No	No	No	Yes	Role: Pharmacist
1997	The Shining	No	Yes	Yes	Yes	Miniseries, role: Gage Creed
1998	The X-Files	No	No	Yes	No	1 episode: "Chinga"
1999	Storm of the Century	No	Yes	Yes	Yes	Miniseries, role: Lawyer in Ad / Reporter on Broken TV
1999	Frasier	No	No	No	Yes	1 episode: "Mary Christmas", role: Brian
2000	The Simpsons	No	No	No	Yes	1 episode: "Insane Clown Poppy", role: Himself
2002	Rose Red	No	Yes	Yes	Yes	Miniseries, role: Pizza Delivery Guy
2003	The Diary of Ellen Rimbauer	No	Yes	No	No	TV film
2004	Kingdom Hospital	No	Yes	Yes	Yes	9 episodes, also developed by King, role: Johnny B. Goode
2004	Riding the Bullet	No	Yes	No	No	
2005	Fever Pitch	No	No	No	Yes	Role: Stephen King
2005	Gotham Cafe	No	No	No	Yes	Short film, role: Mr. Ring
2006	Desperation	No	Yes	Yes	No	TV film
2007	Diary of the Dead	No	No	No	Yes	Role: Newsreader (voice, uncredited)
2010	Sons of Anarchy	No	No	No	Yes	1 episode: "Caregiver", role: Bachman
2012	Stuck in Love	No	No	No	Yes	Role: Stephen King (voice)
2014	Under the Dome	No	Yes	Yes	Yes	1 episode: "Heads Will Roll", role: Diner Patron
2014	A Good Marriage	No	No	Yes	No	
2016	11.22.63	No	Yes	No	No	
2016	Cell	No	No	Yes	No	
2017	Mr. Mercedes	No	Yes	No	Yes	Role: Diner Patron
2018	Castle Rock	No	Yes	No	No	
2019	It Chapter Two	No	No	No	Yes	Role: Shopkeeper
2021	Lisey's Story	No	Yes	Yes	No	Miniseries
2026	Carrie	No	Yes	No	No	Miniseries
2026	Big City Greens	No	No	No	Yes	1 episode: "Killer Kludge", role: Himself (voice)

== Works ==
=== Audiobooks ===
- 2000: On Writing: A Memoir of the Craft (read by Stephen King), Simon & Schuster Audio. ISBN 978-0-7435-0665-6.
- 2004: Salem's Lot (introduction), Simon & Schuster Audio. ISBN 978-0-7435-3696-7.
- 2005: Bag of Bones (read by Stephen King). Simon & Schuster Audio. ISBN 978-0743551755.
- 2008: Needful Things (read by Stephen King), Highbridge Audio. ISBN 978-1598877540.
- 2012: The Wind Through The Keyhole – A Dark Tower Novel (read by Stephen King), Simon & Schuster Audio. ISBN 978-1-4423-4697-0.
- 2016: Desperation (read by Stephen King), Simon & Schuster Audio. ISBN 978-1508218661.
- 2018: Elevation (read by Stephen King), Simon & Schuster Audio. ISBN 978-1508260479.

== See also ==
- Dollar Baby – $1 short story contract with Stephen King
- Haven – Television series loosely based on King novel The Colorado Kid
- Jerusalem's Lot
- List of adaptations of works by Stephen King
