= Summer Thunder =

Short story by Stephen King

- Short story by Stephen King
- Country: United States
- Language: English
- Genre: Short story

Publication
- Published in: Turn Down the Lights
- Publisher: Cemetery Dance Publications
- Media type: Print
- Publication date: 2013

Chronology
"The Rock and Roll Dead Zone"	"Bad Little Kid"

"Summer Thunder" is a horror short story written by American author Stephen King. First published in Turn Down the Lights in 2013, it was collected in King's 2015 short story collection The Bazaar of Bad Dreams.

== Plot summary ==
The world is in a nuclear war, and most of the population has been wiped out. The main character in the story is Peter Robinson, a man in his late forties living in Vermont, whose wife and daughter were in Boston when everyone was suddenly killed. Robinson also finds a stray dog, whom he names "Gandalf", and his bonding with the dog helps him cope with the death of his family.

Bit by bit, it's revealed that Robinson has but one neighbour left, an old man called Timlin, who lives in a luxurious cottage called Veronica and who Robinson befriends over the course of time. The story narrates Robinson's emotions and musings, and the advice given to him by Timlin. Timlin has much more knowledge about the radiation crisis than Robinson, and tells him how those who did survive will slowly die of radiation poisoning. He is proven right by the death of most of the animals in the surrounding wilderness, and further so when Gandalf's health rapidly deteriorates.

Robinson later finds Timlin with a gun on his table. Timlin says he is dying of radiation poisoning, but he doesn't want his death to be slow and painful, and hence has decided to shoot himself with the gun. He gives Robinson a hypodermic needle and advises him to put Gandalf out of his misery and not let him suffer. Timlin later kills himself. Robinson, despite his love and concern for the stricken animal, injects Gandalf with the needle.

Robinson himself starts showing symptoms of terminal radiation poisoning the very next day, and he decides to end his life on his own terms as well. He gets his favorite motorcycle, a Harley-Davidson Fat Boy (whose sound is described as being like summer thunder), running again. He then takes one final, exhilarating ride on it before making a suicidal run off a cliff.

== Publication ==
"Summer Thunder" was first published in 2013 Turn Down the Lights, a limited edition trade hardcover edited by Richard Chizmar that was released by Cemetery Dance Publications to celebrate its 25th anniversary). In 2013, it was collected in The Bazaar of Bad Dreams.
