= October Dreams =

2000 anthology edited by Richard Chizmar and Robert Morrish

October Dreams: A Celebration of Halloween
- October Dreams first edition cover
- Author: Edited by Richard Chizmar and Robert Morrish
- Illustrator: Glenn Chadbourne; Stacy Drum; Jason Van Hollander; Keith Minnion; Allen Koszowski
- Cover artist: Stacy Drum
- Language: English
- Genre: Horror
- Publisher: Cemetery Dance Publications
- Publication date: 2000
- Publication place: United States
- Media type: Print (hardcover)
- Pages: 660 (US hardcover edition)
- ISBN: 978-0-451-45895-7
- OCLC: 50587857

October Dreams (also titled October Dreams: A Celebration of Halloween) is an anthology of Halloween-themed memories and short stories edited by Richard Chizmar and Robert Morrish. Jack Ketchum's "Gone" (first published in this anthology) was nominated for the 2000 Bram Stoker Award for Best Short Fiction.

== Editions ==
This anthology was first published by Cemetery Dance Publications in three different hardcover formats:

- "Trade Edition" bound in full cloth
- "Slipcased Limited Edition" of 450 signed and numbered copies bound in leather
- "Traycased Lettered Edition" of 52 signed and lettered copies bound in leather. This version includes a separate, specially-commissioned Halloween Art Portfolio, featuring twelve pages of artwork.

== Contents ==
- "The Black Pumpkin" by Dean Koontz
- "My Favorite Halloween Memory" by Elizabeth Engstrom
- "Lantern Marsh" by Poppy Z. Brite
- "My Favorite Halloween Memory" by Rick Hautala
- "My Favorite Halloween Memory" by Steve Rasnic Tem
- "Conversations in a Dead Language" by Thomas Ligotti
- "My Favorite Halloween Memory" by Gary A. Braunbeck
- "My Favorite Halloween Memory" by Jack Ketchum
- "Yesterday's Child" by Thomas F. Monteleone
- "My Favorite Halloween Memory" by Hugh B. Cave
- "The Whitby Experience" by Simon Clark
- "My Favorite Halloween Memory" by Christopher Golden
- "In-between" a poem by Ray Bradbury
- "Gone" by Jack Ketchum
- "My Favorite Halloween Memory" by Alan M. Clark
- "Yesterday's Witch" by Gahan Wilson
- "A Short History of Halloween" by Paula Guran
- "My Favorite Halloween Memory" by Poppy Z. Brite
- "Mask Game" by John Shirley
- "My Favorite Halloween Memory" by Thomas Piccirilli
- "My Favorite Halloween Memory" by Jack Cady
- "Out of the Dark" by David B. Silva
- "My Favorite Halloween Memory" by Robert Morrish
- "Heavy Set" by Ray Bradbury
- "My Favorite Halloween Memory" by William F. Nolan
- "My Favorite Halloween Memory" by Michael Cadnum
- "Boo" by Richard Laymon
- "My Favorite Halloween Memory" by Douglas Clegg
- "My Favorite Halloween Memory" by Ray Bradbury
- "Masks" by Douglas E. Winter
- "My Favorite Halloween Memory" by Stanley Wiater
- "A Redress for Andromeda" by Caitlín R. Kiernan
- "My Favorite Halloween Memory" by Richard Laymon
- "The Circle" by Lewis Shiner
- "First of All, It was October" by Gary A. Braunbeck
- "My Favorite Halloween Memory" by Yvonne Navarro
- "Pay the Ghost" by Tim Lebbon
- "My Favorite Halloween Memory" by Kim Newman
- "Buckets" by F. Paul Wilson
- "My Favorite Halloween Memory" by Owl Goingback
- "My Favorite Halloween Memory" by Dennis Etchison
- "Orchestra" by Stephen Mark Rainey
- "My Favorite Halloween Memory" by David B. Silva
- "Eyes" by Charles L. Grant
- "My Favorite Halloween Memory" by Kelly Laymon
- "My Favorite Halloween Memory" by Simon Clark
- "Deathmask" by Dominick Cancilla
- "My Favorite Halloween Memory" by Kristine Kathryn Rusch
- "Some Witch's Bed" by Michael Marshall Smith
- "My Favorite Halloween Memory" by Wayne Allen Sallee
- "The Trick" by Ramsey Campbell
- "My Favorite Halloween Memory" by Edward Gorman
- "Pork Pie Hat" by Peter Straub
- "Trick-or-Read" by Stefan Dziemianowicz
- "My Favorite Halloween Memory" by Peter Crowther

== See also ==
- Bibliography of Halloween
