= Premium Harmony =

Short story by Stephen King

- Short story by Stephen King
- Country: United States
- Language: English
- Genre: Literary Fiction

Publication
- Publisher: The New Yorker
- Media type: Print
- Publication date: November 2009

Chronology
- Series: The Bazaar of Bad Dreams
Mile 81	Batman and Robin Have an Altercation

"Premium Harmony" is a short story by American author Stephen King. It was published in the November 2009 issue of The New Yorker magazine. The story is set in Castle Rock, King's famous fictitious city; in "Premium Harmony" the city is almost abandoned and run-down.

== Plot summary ==
While en route to Wal-Mart for grass seed, Ray and Mary Burkett, with their dog Biznezz in the back seat, fight about the state of their lawn, his smoking, and her obesity. Mary demands they stop at a convenience store in order for her to purchase a purple kickball for their niece's birthday, and while Ray and the dog are waiting in the car, Mary suffers a heart attack in the store and immediately dies. Ray is fetched from the car by a store employee. The emergency medical technicians arrive, pronounce her dead, and remove her body. Ray remains with the store employees and customers, recounting Mary's County Fair awards for her quilting. After nearly two hours have passed, he returns to the car, where Biznezz has died from the extreme heat in the car, with the remnants of a Sno Ball Ray had fed him earlier still in his whiskers. This causes in Ray a simultaneous welling-up of "great sadness" and "amusement".

The story is written in third-person limited narrative and reveals a number of Ray's more egocentric thoughts throughout the story's events, such as being disturbed at the similarity between the manager's attempts at mouth-to-mouth resuscitation and French kissing, the thought that a bystander might give him a mercy fuck, and, as the story closes, the thought that he can now smoke whatever, whenever, and wherever he likes.

== See also ==
- Stephen King short fiction bibliography
