= Tommy (King poem) =

Poem by Stephen King

- Short story by Stephen King
- Country: United States
- Language: English
- Genres: memento mori, confessional poetry

Publication
- Published in: Playboy, The Bazaar of Bad Dreams
- Publication type: poem
- Publisher: Playboy, Charles Scribner's Sons
- Media type: Print
- Publication date: March, 2010

Chronology
Mister Yummy	The Little Green God of Agony

"Tommy" is a narrative poem by Stephen King, first published in the March 2010 edition of Playboy, and later collected and re-introduced in the November 3, 2015 anthology The Bazaar of Bad Dreams. In the new introduction King disputes the famous adage (attributed to many celebrities, including Grace Slick, Robin Williams, Paul Kantner, Joan Collins, and Dennis Hopper): "If you remember the Sixties, you weren't there."

== Content ==
The poem is free verse and steeped in the slang and cultural references of the 1960s, a decade which encompassed all of King's teenage years. It describes the unique burial of the titular young man, a hippie who died of leukaemia, and the subsequent lives of his closest friends.

== See also ==
- Stephen King short fiction bibliography
