= Cookie Jar (short story) =

Short story by Stephen King

- Short story by Stephen King
- Country: United States
- Language: English
- Genre: Horror short story

Publication
- Published in: Virginia Quarterly Review; The Bazaar of Bad Dreams (paperback edition)
- Publisher: University of Virginia
- Media type: Print, digital
- Publication date: March 31, 2016

Chronology
Obits	The Music Room

"Cookie Jar" is a short story by Stephen King, first published in the Virginia Quarterly Review in March 2016.

== Plot summary ==
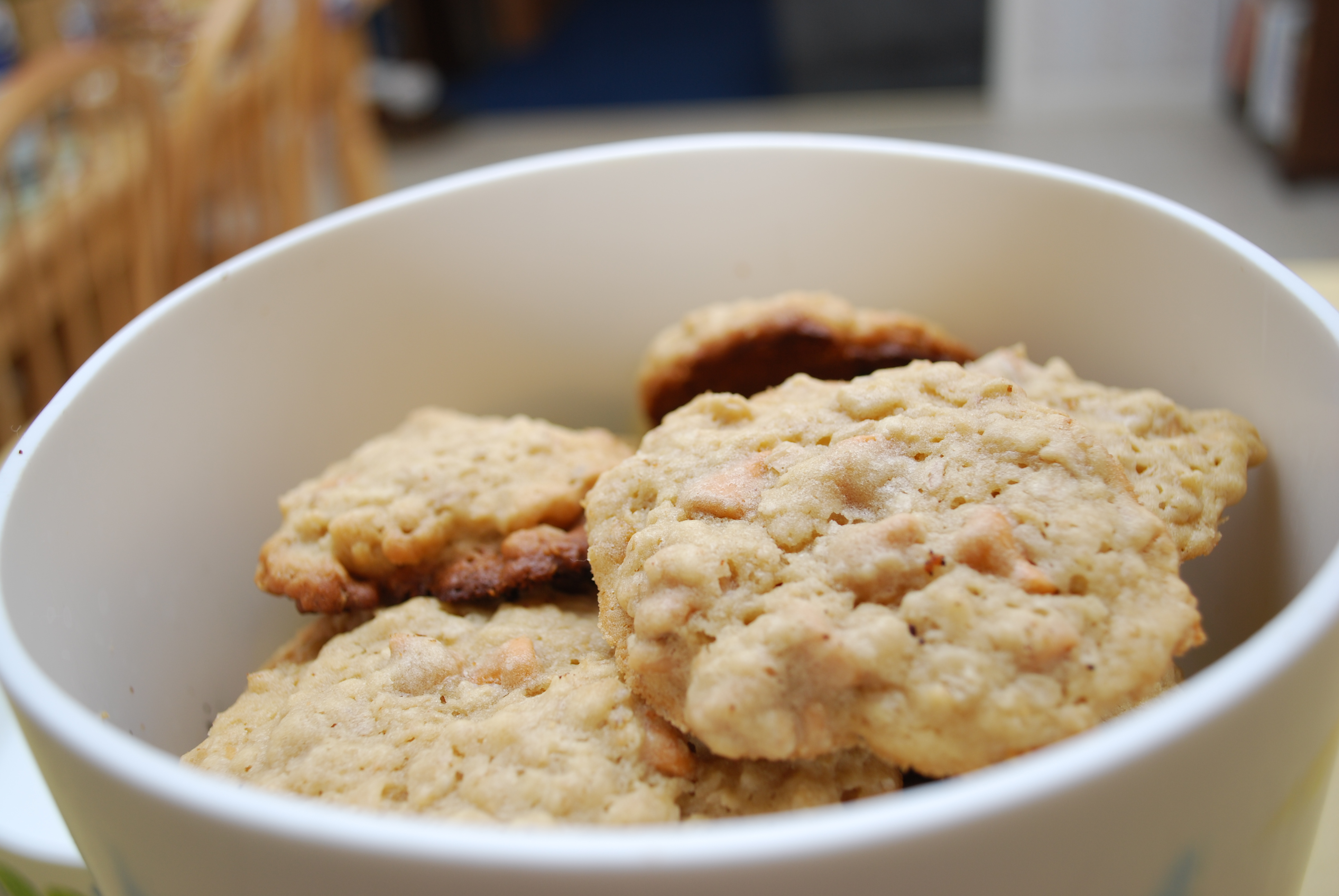
"Cookie Jar" features a mysterious cookie jar.

13-year-old Dale Alderson is interviewing his 90-year-old great-grandfather, Barrett "Rhett" Alderson, for a school assignment. After telling Dale about radio programs he listened to before the advent of television, Rhett – suspecting that he only has months to live – decides to tell Dale a story he has never told anyone before.

In 1927, when Rhett is aged two, his mother Moira leaves the home she shared with her husband and their three sons, moving into a cottage on the other side of their town. Moira, who has bipolar disorder, mysteriously claims that this is necessary to protect her family. Rhett and his older brother Jack regularly visit Moira in her cottage, where she entertains them, including feeding them cookies from a large blue ceramic cookie jar that is always full.

Over time, Moira's behavior becomes increasingly erratic. She begins drawing an elaborate map on a wall of her cottage which she claims depicts "Lalanka", a country in another world populated by "entities": creatures that want to come to Earth to devour it. Moira tells Jack and Rhett stories about Lalanka, including a war between "Red Henry" and "Black John" in which Black John sets Lalanka's "Long Forest" on fire, and the existence of "Gobbits": monstrous creatures capable of producing a white mist, "forza", that kills small animals. Later, Rhett comes to believe that the stories were a distraction from the thing Moira truly feared: the blue cookie jar.

The visits continue until 1938, when Moira commits suicide. The boys are each permitted to take one item from her cottage as a memento, with Rhett taking the cookie jar. Rhett and Jack begin eating cookies every night to remember their mother, realizing after several days that the jar is inexplicably still full of fresh cookies. On one occasion, Rhett begins trying to empty the cookie jar, but gives up when it begins to refill; while replacing cookies in the jar, he notices that his watch stops when inside the jar.

Following the attack on Pearl Harbor in 1941, the three brothers all enlist in the military, with Jack dying when his fighter plane is shot down during the Battle of Iwo Jima. Rhett participates in the Battle of Normandy, the liberation of France and the Western Allied invasion of Germany. In April 1945, he participates in the liberation of the Buchenwald and Dachau concentration camps, where the horrific sights he witnesses make him remember his mother's description of Lalanka. Rhett draws parallels between "Black John" and Adolf Hitler.

After returning from Europe, Rhett began working as an auto mechanic. In March 1946, he retrieves the still-full cookie jar from the attic of his father's home and finally empties it. When Rhett looks at the bottom of the empty jar, he sees an aerial view of what he recognizes as Lalanka. Rhett sees the burned remains of the Long Forest, a thick mist of forza, and a pedlar who is attacked by two Gobbits. Horrified by the sight, Rhett drops the cookie jar, which eventually refills once more.

Dale asks Rhett what became of the cookie jar; Rhett tells him that it is in the attic of Dale's uncle Bill's house. Rhett gifts the jar to Dale, telling him to be careful. Although Dale promises he will, Rhett privately suspects that Dale will himself empty the jar and look into it, reflecting that "in the end we all prefer the bitter to the sweet. It's our curse."

== Publication ==
"Cookie Jar" was initially published in volume 92, number 2 of the Virginia Quarterly Review in March 2016. It was included in the paperback edition of King's short story collection The Bazaar of Bad Dreams, published in October 2016.

== Reception ==
Justin Hamelin of Tom Holland's Terror Time wrote that "King continues to age like a fine wine as a writer", describing Rhett as "as enthralling as any of King's characters". James Arthur Anderson describes "Cookie Jar" as "more literary than King's other fiction" and "an excellent story". Stephen J. Spignesi notes that Cookie Jar" shares a similar framing device as Blockade Billy and The Green Mile, with "a retired senior citizen recounting an epic story from his past". The University of Iowa's Health Story Hub stated that "Cookie Jar" "...has the [Stephen King] mark of supernatural weirdness/unexplainability and also nicely profound messages about why human beings turn down unlimited good things – like fresh baked cookies – in favor of something horrible, like war. Mental health struggles become a superpower and there's symbolism to keep a literature class well engaged..."

== Adaptations ==
An abridged radio adaptation of "Cookie Jar" read by Colin Stinton was broadcast in three parts by BBC Radio 4 in October 2016 as part of its Fright Night Shorts series.

== See also ==
- Stephen King short fiction bibliography
