= The Rock and Roll Dead Zone =

Short story by Stephen King

- Short story by Stephen King
- Country: United States
- Language: English
- Genre: Short story

Publication
- Published in: Hard Listening: The Greatest Rock Band Ever (of Authors) Tells All
- Publication type: Anthology
- Publisher: Coliloquy
- Media type: ebook
- Publication date: 2013

Chronology
"Afterlife"	"Summer Thunder"

"The Rock and Roll Dead Zone" is a short story by Stephen King. It was published in 2013 as part of the anthology work Hard Listening: The Greatest Rock Band Ever (of Authors) Tells All.

== Plot summary ==
"The Rock and Roll Dead Zone" is a first-person narrative with Stephen King himself as the storyteller. It is one of a small number of King's works of fiction to feature King himself as a character.

The story opens with an exhausted King returning to his home after a book tour. Upon arriving, King is met by his childhood friend Edward "Goochie" Gooch, a Falstaffian rock and roll aficionado who is wont to bring King grandiose investment propositions. After making himself a sandwich, Gooch delivers a presentation to King on his latest idea: a theme park named "The Rock and Roll Dead Zone" (a homage to King's novel The Dead Zone), for which Gooch is seeking a $30,000,000 (equivalent to $41,464,000 in 2025) investment from King.

Gooch shows King various artist's impressions of the theme park, which is to feature dioramas portraying locations relating to rock and roll songs about death. These are to include the "Honey House" (from Bobby Goldsboro's "Honey"), the "Eddie Cochrane Memorial Highway, leading straight to Dead Man's Curve" (from Jan and Dean's "Dead Man's Curve"), the "Dickey Lee Go-Kart Arena" (from Ray Peterson's "Tell Laura I Love Her"), "Big John's Mine of Doom" (from The Buoys' "Timothy"), and the "Tallahatchie Bridge" (from Bobbie Gentry's "Ode to Billie Joe") over the "Moody River" (from Pat Boone's "Moody River").

The story ends with King offering to give Gooch Mitch Albom's phone number, telling Gooch "you need somebody who's more hip to the afterlife".

== Publication ==
"The Rock and Roll Dead Zone" was published in June 2013 as part of the anthology ebook Hard Listening: The Greatest Rock Band Ever (of Authors) Tells All, edited by Sam Barry. Hard Listening was presented as a history of the Rock Bottom Remainders, a charity supergroup made up of King and other writers. The story was originally uncredited to King; the ebook featured four stories written in the style of King, with readers challenged to guess which was actually authored by King. (The three other "King-esque" stories were written by other members of the Rock Bottom Remainders who attempted to "out-Steve Steve".)

== Reception ==
Paul Simpson note that "the thematic and stylistic analysis carried out on the texts by the Book Genome Project did not suggest that King was the author of this story at all - perhaps proving once and for all that Stephen King can pretty much write about any subject if he puts his mind to it."

== See also ==
- Stephen King short fiction bibliography
