= Borderlands 5 =

2004 anthology edited by Thomas F. Monteleone and Elizabeth Monteleone

- First edition, cover art by Michael Wilby
- Editor: Thomas F. Monteleone and Elizabeth Monteleone
- Genre: Horror
- Publisher: Borderlands Press
- Publication date: March 2004
- ISBN: 978-1-880325-37-7

Borderlands 5 is an anthology edited by Thomas F. Monteleone and Elizabeth Monteleone, published in 2004 by Borderlands Press. Including a new story by Stephen King, the anthology featured over a dozen new horror stories. It was also published as From the Borderlands from Warner Books.

== Contents ==
- "Rami Temporalis" by Gary A. Braunbeck
- "All Hands" by John R. Platt
- "Faith will Make You Free" by Holly Newstein
- "N0072-JKI" by Adam Corbin Fusco
- "Time for Me" by Barry Hoffman
- "The Growth of Alan Ashley" by Bill Gauthier
- "The Goat" by Whitt Pond
- "Prisoner 392" by Jon F. Merz
- "The Food Processor" by Michael Canfield
- "Story Time with the BlueField Strangler" by John Farris
- "Answering the Call" by Brian Freeman
- "Smooth Operator" by Dominick Cancilla
- "Father Bob and Bobby" by Whitley Strieber
- "A Thing" by Barbara Malenky
- "The Planting" by Bentley Little
- "Infliction" by John McIlveen
- "Dysfunction" by Darren O. Godfrey
- "The Thing too Hideous to Describe" by David J. Schow
- "Slipknot" by Brett Alexander Savory
- "Magic Numbers" by Gene O'Neill
- "Head Music" by Lon Prater
- "Around it Still the Sumac Grows" by Tom Piccirilli
- "Annabell" by L. Lynn Young
- "One of those weeks" by Bev Vincent
- "Stationary Bike" by Stephen King
