= Act of Love =

Act of Love may refer to:

- Act of Love (politics) a political statement by Jeb Bush that became an important part of the 2016 Republican Presidential Primary campaign
- Act of Love (1953 film), a 1953 American romantic drama film
- Act of Love (1980 film), a 1980 American made-for-TV film
- Act of Love (novel), 1981 novel by Joe R. Lansdale
- "Act of Love", a song by Neil Young and Pearl Jam from Mirrorball, 1995

== See also ==
- Acts of Love (disambiguation)
