= Brian James Freeman =

American novelist

- Born: 1979 (age 46–47); Pittsburgh, Pennsylvania, U.S.
- Education: Shippensburg University of Pennsylvania
- Occupations: Novelist, short story writer
- Writing career
- Pen name: James Kidman, Brian Freeman
- Period: 1994–present
- Genres: Literary fiction, horror fiction
- Website: brianjamesfreeman.com

Brian James Freeman (born 1979) is an American author whose fiction has been published in magazines and anthologies including Borderlands 5, Corpse Blossoms, and all four volumes of the Shivers series. His first novel, Black Fire, was written under the pseudonym James Kidman. Published in 2004 by Leisure Books and Cemetery Dance Publications, the book was nominated for the Bram Stoker Award for Best First Novel, one of the major awards in the horror genre. His work has been nominated for several awards in the horror genre over the years. Cemetery Dance Publications recently published his Blue November Storms, a new novella, and The Illustrated Stephen King Trivia Book, which he wrote with Stephen King expert Bev Vincent. Acclaimed horror artist Glenn Chadbourne created over fifty unique illustrations for the book.

He graduated from Shippensburg University in 2002 with a journalism degree. Brian Freeman lives in Pennsylvania and he is currently writing a new novel.

His first published work was the 1994 short story "Bus Trip" in the anthology Paths of Imagination. His first novel was Black Fire in 2004.

Brian Freeman is also the founder, owner and publisher of Lonely Road Books, a publishing company that specializes in deluxe signed limited edition books. Lonely Road Books has released and are releasing books by Stephen King (Blockade Billy and Riding the Bullet: The Deluxe Special Edition Double) Ray Garton (The Arthur Darknell Double), Douglas Clegg (The Vampyricon Trilogy: The Definitive Special Edition), Stewart O'Nan (Poe), and the Dark Forces: The 25th Anniversary Special Edition anthology edited by Kirby McCauley.

== Selected bibliography ==
=== Novels and Novellas ===
- Blue November Storms (Limited Edition hardcover from Cemetery Dance Publications, 2005)
  - A revised paperback and E-book edition of Blue November Storms was released in 2013 with new illustrations by Glenn Chadbourne, an introduction by Ray Garton, and "Ink-slinger: An Interview with Glenn Chadbourne" by Robert Brouhard
- Black Fire (as James Kidman) (Cemetery Dance Publications, hardcover, and Leisure Books, paperback 2004)
- This Painted Darkness (as Brian James Freeman) (Cemetery Dance Publications, 2010)
- The Halloween Children written by Brian James Freeman and Norman Prentiss.
- The Zombie Who Cried Human
- Darkness Whispers written by Richard Chizmar and Brian James Freeman
- The Painted Darkness

=== Non-fiction ===
- The Illustrated Stephen King Trivia Book - co-authored with Bev Vincent and illustrated by Glenn Chadbourne (Cemetery Dance Publications, 2005)
- Buzz Your MP3 (Pigeonhole Press, November 2001)

=== Chapbooks ===
- "Pulled Into Darkness" (Cemetery Dance Publications, 2004)

=== Short story collections ===
- More Than Midnight - limited edition hardcover featuring "What They Left Behind," "The Final Lesson," "Among Us," "Pulled Into Darkness," "Answering the Call," with an introduction by Michael Koryta and illustrations by Glenn Chadbourne (Cemetery Dance Publications, 2012)
- Seven Stories - eBook featuring "Walking With the Ghosts of Pier 13," "Running Rain," "Answering the Call," "The Punishment Room," "What They Left Behind," "A Dreamlike State," and "Where Sunlight Sleeps" (Cemetery Dance Publications, 2010)

==== Short story anthology appearances ====
- In Laymon's Terms - edited by Kelly Laymon, Steve Gerlach, and Richard Chizmar (Cemetery Dance Publications, 2010), featuring "Loving Roger" and a non-fiction piece called "Meeting Richard Laymon"
- 4 Fear Of by Richard Chizmar, Brian Freeman, Brian Keene, and Tom Monteleone (Borderlands Press, 2006), featuring "Passenger 36-B," "What They Left Behind," and "One Last Lesson" (revised version of the previously published "Bigger and Better")
- Borderlands 5 - edited by Elizabeth E. Monteleone & Thomas F. Monteleone (Borderlands Press, 2003), featuring "Answering the Call" which was reprinted in From the Borderlands (Warner Books, 2004) and The Best of the Borderlands (Borderlands Press, 2005)
- Corpse Blossoms - edited by Julia Sevin and R.J. Sevin (Creeping Hemlock Press, 2005), featuring "Running Rain"
- The Best of Horrorfind II - edited by Brian Keene (Horrorfind LLC, 2003), featuring "Bigger and Better"
- In Darkness Eternal II - edited by Glenda Woodrum (Stygian Vortex Publications, 1996), featuring "The Glow"

===== Shivers anthology series =====
All from Cemetery Dance Publications and edited by Richard Chizmar:

- Shivers (2002), featuring "Walking With the Ghosts of Pier 13"
- Shivers II (2003), featuring "Marking the Passage of Time"
- Shivers III (2004), featuring "What They Left Behind"
- Shivers IV (2006), featuring "Something to Be Said for the Waiting"
- Shivers V (2009), featuring "One More Day"

== See also ==
- List of horror fiction authors
