= World Fantasy Special Award—Non-professional =

Literary award for non-professional science fiction or fantasy achievements

- Awarded for: The best non-professional work not covered by other World Fantasy Award categories
- Presented by: World Fantasy Convention
- First award: 1975
- Most recent winner: Wendy Wagner (Nightmare)
- Website: worldfantasy.org/awards/

The World Fantasy Awards are given each year by the World Fantasy Convention for the best fantasy fiction and art published in English during the preceding calendar year. The awards have been described by sources such as The Guardian as a "prestigious fantasy prize", and as one of the three most renowned speculative fiction awards, along with the Hugo and Nebula Awards (which cover both fantasy and science fiction). The World Fantasy Special Award—Non-professional is given each year to individuals for their non-professional work in the preceding calendar year in fields related to fantasy that are not covered by other World Fantasy Award categories. These have included editors of magazines and novels, publishers, and authors of non-fiction works. Occasionally some publishing companies have been nominated along with individual editors and publishers. The nomination reasons have sometimes not been specified beyond "contributions to the genre". Individuals are also eligible for the Special Award—Professional category for their professional work. The World Fantasy Special Award—Non-professional has been awarded annually since 1975.

World Fantasy Award nominees and winners are decided by attendees and judges at the annual World Fantasy Convention. A ballot is posted in June for attendees of the current and previous two conferences to determine two of the finalists, and a panel of five judges adds three or more nominees before voting on the overall winner. The panel of judges is typically made up of fantasy authors and is chosen each year by the World Fantasy Awards Administration, which has the power to break ties. The final results are presented at the World Fantasy Convention at the end of October. Through 2015, winners were presented with a statuette of H. P. Lovecraft; more recent winners receive a statuette of a tree.

During the 52 nomination years, 275 individuals and 3 organizations have been nominated; 62 people and 2 organizations have won, including ties and co-nominees. The organizations that have been nominated are: The British Fantasy Society, with one winning nomination; The Friends of Arthur Machen, with one unsuccessful nomination; and Fedogan & Bremer, with one win out of three nominations. Stuart David Schiff has received the most awards at four wins out of six nominations, for his work at Whispers magazine and Whispers Press. R. B. Russell has won four times out of nine nominations, and Rosalie Parker four out of eight, for their work at Tartarus Press. Three other individuals have won twice: Paul C. Allen out of three nominations for Fantasy Newsletter, Richard Chizmar out of seven for Cemetery Dance and Cemetery Dance Publications, and W. Paul Ganley out of ten for Weirdbook and Weirdbook Press. Ganley's ten nominations are the most of anyone, tied with Scott H. Andrews's one win out of ten nominations for his work at Beneath Ceaseless Skies, and followed by Stephen Jones with nine, winning once, for Fantasy Tales and other work, and Lynne M. Thomas and Michael Damian Thomas with one win out of nine nominations for Uncanny Magazine.

== Winners and nominees ==
In the following table, the years correspond to the date of the ceremony, rather than when the work was performed. The table includes the stated reason the individual (or company) was nominated, which may not have been the only fantasy-related non-professional work they did during the previous calendar year. "N/A" in the reason column represents a nomination where no reason was given. Entries with a yellow background and an asterisk (*) next to the individual's name have won the award; the other entries are the other nominees on the shortlist.

* Winners

Winners and nominees
Year	Winner or nominee	Reason(s) (Note: The reasons given are taken directly from the World Fantasy Awards administration. Specific works are italicized, while publishing companies are not. Books are followed by their publisher to distinguish them from magazines.)	Ref.
1975	Stuart David Schiff*	Whispers	
1975	Roy A. Squires	publishing	
1975	Harry O. Morris	Nyctalops	
1976	Karl Edward Wagner*	Carcosa, publisher	
1976	David Drake*	Carcosa, publisher	
1976	James Groce*	Carcosa, publisher	
1976	Harry O. Morris	publishing/editing	
1976	George H. Scithers	publishing/editing	
1976	Roy A. Squires	publishing/editing	
1976	Robert Weinberg	publishing/editing	
1976	Gerry de la Ree	publishing/editing	
1977	Stuart David Schiff*	editing/publishing Whispers	
1977	Jonathan Bacon	editing/publishing Fantasy Crossroads	
1977	Arnie Fenner	editing/publishing Chacal	
1977	Nils Hardin	publishing/editing Xenophile	
1977	Gary Hoppenstand	publishing/editing Midnight Sun	
1977	Harry O. Morris	editing/publishing Nyctalops	
1978	Robert Weinberg*	publishing and editing	
1978	W. Paul Ganley	Weirdbook	
1978	Gary Hoppenstand	Midnight Sun	
1978	Stephen Jones	Fantasy Tales	
1978	Harry O. Morris	Nyctalops	
1978	Jonathan Bacon	Fantasy Crossroads	
1979	Donald H. Tuck*	The Encyclopedia of Science Fiction and Fantasy, Vol. 2	
1979	Paul C. Allen	Fantasy Newsletter	
1979	Pat Cadigan	Shayol	
1979	Arnie Fenner	Shayol	
1979	W. Paul Ganley	Weirdbook	
1979	Stuart David Schiff	Whispers and Whispers Press	
1980	Paul C. Allen*	Fantasy Newsletter	
1980	Pat Cadigan	Shayol	
1980	Arnie Fenner	Shayol	
1980	Harry O. Morris	Nyctalops	
1980	Stuart David Schiff	Whispers and Whispers Press	
1981	Pat Cadigan*	Shayol	
1981	Arnie Fenner*	Shayol	
1981	Charles de Lint	Triskell Press; Dragonfields	
1981	Charles R. Saunders	Triskell Press; Dragonfields	
1981	W. Paul Ganley	Weirdbook	
1981	Stephen Jones	Fantasy Tales; Airgedlamh	
1981	David Sutton	Fantasy Tales; Airgedlamh	
1982	Paul C. Allen*	Fantasy Newsletter	
1982	Robert A. Collins*	Fantasy Newsletter	
1982	W. Paul Ganley	Weirdbook	
1982	Stephen Jones	Fantasy Tales	
1982	David Sutton	Fantasy Tales	
1982	Ken Keller	Trumpet	
1983	Stuart David Schiff*	Whispers and Whispers Press	
1983	W. Paul Ganley	Weirdbook	
1983	Robert T. Garcia	American Fantasy	
1983	Francesco Cova	Kadath	
1983	Stephen Jones	Fantasy Tales	
1983	David Sutton	Fantasy Tales	
1984	Stephen Jones*	Fantasy Tales	
1984	David Sutton*	Fantasy Tales	
1984	Robert M. Price	Crypt of Cthulhu	
1984	Douglas E. Winter	criticism	
1984	W. Paul Ganley	Weirdbook	
1984	Robert A. Collins	Fantasy Newsletter/Fantasy Review	
1985	Stuart David Schiff*	Whispers and Whispers Press	
1985	Jeff Conner	Scream/Press	
1985	W. Paul Ganley	Weirdbook and Weirdbook Press	
1985	Paul Mikol	Dark Harvest	
1985	Scot Stadalsky	Dark Harvest	
1986	Douglas E. Winter*	reviewing	
1986	David B. Silva	The Horror Show	
1986	Paul Mikol	Dark Harvest	
1986	Scot Stadalsky	Dark Harvest	
1986	Jeff Conner	Scream/Press	
1986	W. Paul Ganley	Weirdbook and Weirdbook Press	
1987	W. Paul Ganley*	Weirdbook and Weirdbook Press	
1987	Jeff Conner*	Scream/Press	
1987	Stephen Jones	Fantasy Tales	
1987	David Sutton	Fantasy Tales	
1987	David B. Silva	The Horror Show	
1988	Robert T. Garcia*	American Fantasy	
1988	Nancy Garcia*	American Fantasy	
1988	David B. Silva*	The Horror Show	
1988	Stephen Jones	Fantasy Tales	
1988	David Sutton	Fantasy Tales	
1988	Paul Mikol	Dark Harvest	
1988	Scot Stadalsky	Dark Harvest	
1989	Kristine Kathryn Rusch*	Pulphouse	
1989	Dean Wesley Smith*	Pulphouse	
1989	Carl T. Ford	Dagon Press	
1989	Peggy Nadramia	Grue	
1989	Paul F. Olson	Horrorstruck	
1990	Peggy Nadramia*	Grue	
1990	David B. Silva	The Horror Show	
1990	Joe Stefko	Charnel House	
1990	Tracy Cocoman	Charnel House	
1990	Richard Chizmar	Cemetery Dance	
1991	Richard Chizmar*	Cemetery Dance	
1991	Steve Pasechnick	Strange Plasma	
1991	Barry Hoffman	Gauntlet	
1991	Marc Michaud	Necronomicon Press	
1992	W. Paul Ganley*	Weirdbook	
1992	Joe Stefko	Charnel House	
1992	Tracy Cocoman	Charnel House	
1992	Peggy Nadramia	Grue	
1992	Barry Hoffman	Gauntlet	
1992	Crispin Burnham	Eldritch Tales	
1993	Doug Lewis*	Roadkill Press	
1993	Tomi Lewis*	Roadkill Press	
1993	John Gregory Betancourt	Wildside Press	
1993	Kim Betancourt	Wildside Press	
1993	Stanislaus Tal	Tal Publications	
1993	George Hatch	Horror's Head Press	
1993	Richard Chizmar	Cemetery Dance	
1993	Joe Stefko	Charnel House	
1993	Tracy Cocoman	Charnel House	
1994	Marc Michaud*	Necronomicon Press	
1994	Brian Stableford	small press reviews	
1994	George Hatch	Horror's Head Press	
1994	Joe Stefko	Charnel House	
1994	Tracy Cocoman	Charnel House	
1994	Richard Chizmar	Cemetery Dance Publications	
1995	Bryan Cholfin*	Broken Mirrors Press; Crank!	
1995	John Gregory Betancourt	Wildside Press	
1995	Kim Betancourt	Wildside Press	
1995	Richard Chizmar	Cemetery Dance Publications	
1995	Michael Andre-Driussi	Lexicon Urthus: A Dictionary for the Urth Cycle (Sirius Fiction)	
1995	David Sutton	Voices from Shadow (Shadow Publishing)	
1996	Marc Michaud*	Necronomicon Press	
1996	Fedogan & Bremer	book publishing	
1996	Robert K. J. Killheffer	Century	
1996	Meg Hamel	Century	
1996	Jenna A. Felice	Century	
1996	Steve Pasechnick	Edgewood Press	
1996	Robert Weinberg	contributions to the genre	
1997	Barbara Roden*	Ash-Tree Press	
1997	Christopher Roden*	Ash-Tree Press	
1997	Fedogan & Bremer	book publishing	
1997	Paula Guran	DarkEcho	
1998	Fedogan & Bremer*	book publishing	
1998	Richard Chizmar	Cemetery Dance and Cemetery Dance Publications	
1998	Chris Logan Edwards	Tigereyes Press	
1998	Jeff VanderMeer	The Ministry of Whimsy Press	
1998	Tom Winstead	The Ministry of Whimsy Press	
1998	Barry Hoffman	Gauntlet and Gauntlet book publishing	
1999	Richard Chizmar*	Cemetery Dance Publications	
1999	Jacob Weisman	Tachyon Publications	
1999	Steve Pasechnick	Edgewood Press	
1999	David Marshall	Pumpkin Books	
2000	The British Fantasy Society*	N/A	
2000	Ken Abner	Terminal Fright Press	
2000	Philip J. Rahman	Fedogan & Bremer	
2000	Dennis E. Weiler	Fedogan & Bremer	
2000	Rosemary Pardoe	Haunted Library	
2000	William K. Schafer	Subterranean Press	
2000	R. B. Russell	Tartarus Press	
2001	Bill Sheehan*	At the Foot of the Story Tree: An Inquiry into the Fiction of Peter Straub (Subterranean Press)	
2001	R. B. Russell	Tartarus Press	
2001	Rosalie Parker	Tartarus Press	
2001	Barbara Roden	Ash-Tree Press	
2001	Christopher Roden	Ash-Tree Press	
2001	Philip J. Rahman	Fedogan & Bremer	
2001	Dennis E. Weiler	Fedogan & Bremer	
2001	Benjamin Cossel	Night Shade Books	
2001	Jeremy Lassen	Night Shade Books	
2001	Jason Williams	Night Shade Books	
2001	Peter Crowther	PS Publishing	
2002	R. B. Russell*	Tartarus Press	
2002	Rosalie Parker*	Tartarus Press	
2002	Peter Crowther	PS Publishing	
2002	Michael Waltz, et al.	Sidecar Preservation Society	
2002	Paula Guran	Horror Garage	
2002	Jerad Walters	Cocytus Press	
2003	Benjamin Cossel*	Night Shade Books	
2003	Jeremy Lassen*	Night Shade Books	
2003	Jason Williams*	Night Shade Books	
2003	Gavin Grant	Small Beer Press	
2003	Kelly Link	Small Beer Press	
2003	Sean Wallace	Prime Books	
2003	Michael Walsh	Old Earth Books	
2003	Peter Crowther	PS Publishing	
2004	R. B. Russell*	Tartarus Press	
2004	Rosalie Parker*	Tartarus Press	
2004	Deborah Layne	Wheatland Press	
2004	Jay Lake	Wheatland Press	
2004	Paul Miller	Earthling Publications	
2004	Dave Truesdale	Tangent Online	
2004	Rodger Turner	SF Site	
2004	Neil Walsh	SF Site	
2004	Wayne MacLaurin	SF Site	
2005	Robert Morgan*	Sarob Press	
2005	Sandy Auden	The Alien Online	
2005	Ariel	The Alien Online	
2005	Matthew Cheney	The Mumpsimus	
2005	Barbara Roden	All Hallows	
2005	Christopher Roden	All Hallows	
2005	Michael Walsh	Old Earth Books	
2006	David J. Howe*	Telos Publishing	
2006	Stephen Walker*	Telos Publishing	
2006	The Friends of Arthur Machen	Faunus, Machenalia, and The Life of Arthur Machen (Telos Publishing)	
2006	Rodger Turner	SF Site	
2006	Neil Walsh	SF Site	
2006	Wayne MacLaurin	SF Site	
2006	Leo Grin	The Cimmerian	
2006	Jess Nevins	The Encyclopedia of Fantastic Victoriana (MonkeyBrain Books)	
2007	Gary K. Wolfe*	reviews and criticism in Locus and elsewhere	
2007	Leslie Howle	her work at Clarion West	
2007	Leo Grin	The Cimmerian	
2007	Susan Marie Groppi	Strange Horizons	
2007	John Klima	Electric Velocipede	
2008	Midori Snyder	Endicott Studios Website	
2008	Terri Windling*	Endicott Studios Website	
2008	G. S. Evans	Café Irreal	
2008	Alice Whittenburg	Café Irreal	
2008	John Klima	Electric Velocipede	
2008	R. B. Russell	Tartarus Press	
2008	Rosalie Parker	Tartarus Press	
2008	Stephen Jones	Travellers in Darkness: The Souvenir Book of the World Horror Convention 2007 (World Horror Convention)	
2009	Michael Walsh*	Howard Waldrop collections from Old Earth Books	
2009	Edith L. Crowe	her work with The Mythopoeic Society	
2009	Elise Matthesen	setting out to inspire and for serving as inspiration for works of poetry, fantasy, and SF over the last decade through her jewelry-making and her "artist's challenges".	
2009	Sean Wallace	Clarkesworld Magazine	
2009	Neil Clarke	Clarkesworld Magazine	
2009	Nick Mamatas	Clarkesworld Magazine	
2009	John Klima	Electric Velocipede	
2010	Susan Marie Groppi*	Strange Horizons	
2010	Bob Colby	Readercon	
2010	B. Diane Martin	Readercon	
2010	Dave Shaw	Readercon	
2010	Eric M. Van	Readercon	
2010	Neil Clarke	Clarkesworld Magazine	
2010	Cheryl Morgan	Clarkesworld Magazine	
2010	Sean Wallace	Clarkesworld Magazine	
2010	John Klima	Electric Velocipede	
2010	John Berlyne	Powers: Secret Histories (PS Publishing)	
2010	R. B. Russell	Tartarus Press	
2010	Rosalie Parker	Tartarus Press	
2011	Alisa Krasnostein*	Twelfth Planet Press	
2011	Stephen Jones	Brighton Shock!: The Souvenir Book Of The World Horror Convention 2010 (PS Publishing)	
2011	Michael Marshall Smith	Brighton Shock!: The Souvenir Book Of The World Horror Convention 2010 (PS Publishing)	
2011	Amanda Foubister	Brighton Shock!: The Souvenir Book Of The World Horror Convention 2010 (PS Publishing)	
2011	Matthew Kressel	Sybil's Garage and Senses Five Press	
2011	Charles Tan	Bibliophile Stalker	
2011	Lavie Tidhar	The World SF Blog	
2012	R. B. Russell*	Tartarus Press	
2012	Rosalie Parker*	Tartarus Press	
2012	Charles Tan	Bibliophile Stalker blog	
2012	Kate Baker	Clarkesworld Magazine	
2012	Neil Clarke	Clarkesworld Magazine	
2012	Cheryl Morgan	Clarkesworld Magazine	
2012	Sean Wallace	Clarkesworld Magazine	
2012	Cat Rambo	Fantasy Magazine	
2012	Mark Valentine	Wormwood	
2013	S. T. Joshi*	Unutterable Horror: A History of Supernatural Fiction, Volumes 1 & 2 (PS Publishing)	
2013	L. Timmel Duchamp	Aqueduct Press	
2013	Scott H. Andrews	Beneath Ceaseless Skies	
2013	Charles Tan	Bibliophile Stalker blog	
2013	Jerad Walters	Centipede Press	
2013	Joseph Wrzos	Hannes Bok: A Life in Illustration (Centipede Press)	
2014	Kate Baker*	Clarkesworld Magazine	
2014	Neil Clarke*	Clarkesworld Magazine	
2014	Sean Wallace*	Clarkesworld Magazine	
2014	Scott H. Andrews	Beneath Ceaseless Skies	
2014	Marc Aplin	Fantasy-Faction	
2014	Leslie Howle	Clarion West administration	
2014	Mieneke van der Salm	A Fantastical Librarian	
2015	R. B. Russell*	Tartarus Press	
2015	Rosalie Parker*	Tartarus Press	
2015	Scott H. Andrews	Beneath Ceaseless Skies	
2015	Matt Cardin	Born to Fear: Interviews with Thomas Ligotti (Subterranean Press)	
2015	Stefan Fergus	Civilian Reader	
2015	Patrick Swenson	Fairwood Press	
2016	John O'Neill*	Black Gate	
2016	Helen Young	Tales After Tolkien Society	
2016	Scott H. Andrews	Beneath Ceaseless Skies	
2016	Jedediah Berry	The Family Arcana: A Story in Cards (Ninepin Press)	
2016	Eben Kling	The Family Arcana: A Story in Cards (Ninepin Press)	
2016	Alexandra Pierce	Letters to Tiptree (Twelfth Planet Press)	
2016	Alisa Krasnostein	Letters to Tiptree (Twelfth Planet Press)	
2016	Lynne M. Thomas	Uncanny Magazine	
2016	Michael Damian Thomas	Uncanny Magazine	
2017	Neile Graham*	fostering excellence in the genre through her role as Workshop Director, Clarion West	
2017	Scott H. Andrews	Beneath Ceaseless Skies	
2017	Malcolm R. Phifer	The Fantasy Illustration Library, Volume Two: Gods and Goddesses	
2017	Michael C. Phifer	The Fantasy Illustration Library, Volume Two: Gods and Goddesses	
2017	Brian White	Fireside Fiction Company	
2017	Lynne M. Thomas	Uncanny Magazine	
2017	Michael Damian Thomas	Uncanny Magazine	
2018	Justina Ireland*	FIYAH: Magazine of Black Speculative Fiction	
2018	Troy L. Wiggins*	FIYAH: Magazine of Black Speculative Fiction	
2018	Scott H. Andrews	Beneath Ceaseless Skies	
2018	Khaalidah Muhammad-Ali	PodCastle	
2018	Jen R. Albert	PodCastle	
2018	R. B. Russell	Tartarus Press	
2018	Rosalie Parker	Tartarus Press	
2018	Lynne M. Thomas	Uncanny Magazine	
2018	Michael Damian Thomas	Uncanny Magazine	
2019	Scott H. Andrews*	Beneath Ceaseless Skies	
2019	Terri Windling	Myth and Moor	
2019	Mike Allen	Mythic Delirium	
2019	E. Catherine Tobler	Shimmer	
2019	Lynne M. Thomas	Uncanny Magazine	
2019	Michael Damian Thomas	Uncanny Magazine	
2020	Bodhisattva Chattopadhyay*	Fafnir – Nordic Journal of Science Fiction and Fantasy Research	
2020	Laura E. Goodin*	Fafnir – Nordic Journal of Science Fiction and Fantasy Research	
2020	Esko Suoranta*	Fafnir – Nordic Journal of Science Fiction and Fantasy Research	
2020	Michael Kelly	Undertow Publications, The Year's Best Weird Fiction	
2020	Jonathan Strahan	Coode Street Podcast	
2020	Gary K. Wolfe	Coode Street Podcast	
2020	Lynne M. Thomas	Uncanny Magazine	
2020	Michael Damian Thomas	Uncanny Magazine	
2020	Terri Windling	Myth & Moor	
2021	Brian Attebery*	Journal of the Fantastic in the Arts	
2021	Scott H. Andrews	Beneath Ceaseless Skies	
2021	Michael Kelly	Undertow Publications	
2021	Arley Sorg	Fantasy Magazine	
2021	Christie Yant	Fantasy Magazine	
2021	Lynne M. Thomas	Uncanny Magazine	
2021	Michael Damian Thomas	Uncanny Magazine	
2022	Tonia Ransom*	Nightlight: A Horror Fiction Podcast	
2022	Gautam Bhatia	Strange Horizons	
2022	Vanessa Rose Phin	Strange Horizons	
2022	Maria J. Pérez Cuervo	Hellebore	
2022	Michael Kelly	Undertow Publications	
2022	Arley Sorg	Fantasy Magazine	
2022	Christie Yant	Fantasy Magazine	
2022	Lynne M. Thomas	Uncanny Magazine	
2022	Michael Damian Thomas	Uncanny Magazine	
2023	Michael Kelly*	Undertow Publications	
2023	Cristina Macía	The Celsius Festival	
2023	Dave Ring	Neon Hemlock Press	
2023	Lynne M. Thomas	Uncanny Magazine	
2023	Michael Damian Thomas	Uncanny Magazine	
2023	E. Catherine Tobler	Editing The Deadlands	
2024	Lynne M. Thomas*	Uncanny Magazine	
2024	Michael Damian Thomas*	Uncanny Magazine	
2024	Scott H. Andrews	Beneath Ceaseless Skies	
2024	Trevor Kennedy	Phantasmagoria	
2024	Brian J. Showers	Swan River Press	
2024	Julian Yap	The Sunday Morning Transport	
2024	Fran Wilde	The Sunday Morning Transport	
2025	Steve J. Shaw*	Black Shuck Books	
2025	Andy Duncan	"It Is Always Time to Think about These Things" (Journal of the Fantastic in the Arts)	
2025	Gavin Grant	Lady Churchill's Rosebud Wristlet	
2025	Kelly Link	Lady Churchill's Rosebud Wristlet	
2025	Michael Kelly	Undertow Publications and Weird Horror	
2025	DaVaun Sanders	FIYAH Literary Magazine	
2026	Wendy Wagner*	Nightmare	
2026	Scott H. Andrews	Beneath Ceaseless Skies	
2026	Andy Cox	Remains	
2026	Patrick Swenson	Fairwood Press and the Rainforest Writers Village Retreat	
2026	E. Catherine Tobler	The Deadlands	

== See also ==
- World Fantasy Convention
