= A Death =

Short story by Stephen King

- Short story by Stephen King
- Country: United States
- Language: English
- Genres: crime, historical

Publication
- Published in: The New Yorker, The Bazaar of Bad Dreams
- Publication type: short story
- Publisher: The New Yorker, Charles Scribner's Sons
- Media type: Print
- Publication date: March 9, 2015 (first publication)

Chronology
Bad Little Kid	The Bone Church

"A Death" is a short story by Stephen King, first published in the March 9, 2015 issue of The New Yorker, and collected in the November 3 collection The Bazaar of Bad Dreams. In his "Introduction" to the latter book, King suggests that he was somewhat inspired by The Hair of Harold Roux (1975), a novel by Thomas Williams, which King describes as the best book about writing ever written.

Set in the Dakota Territory, 1889, the story describes the arrest, trial, and conviction of Jim Trusdale, a simple-minded rancher's son, for a crime he may not have committed.

== Synopsis ==
Sheriff Barclay and his deputies arrive at the ranch currently inhabited by Jim Trusdale. Trusdale's father, the owner, is being cared for elsewhere in his old age. They arrest Trusdale, who's reading Black Hills Pioneer by lantern light. Confused and resistant but calm, he's led away from the ranch in a funeral hack to the local jail. The path leads him through a crowd of townsfolk who jeer at him.

He's informed that the crime he's been accused of is the murder, robbery, and implied molestation of a ten-year-old girl, who was on her way to a sweet shop with a silver dollar given to her by her mother. Trusdale is accused because his hat was found inside her dress, a hat he treasured and always wore, but wasn't wearing and couldn't account for when he was arrested. The missing silver dollar is presumed to be either in his possession or discarded, since there's no record of him spending it, but no evidence is gained from a full-body strip search by Barclay.

As an economic measure the trial judge, Roger Mizell, also serves as the prosecuting attorney, a quirk of procedure described by a juror as "like a banker taking out a loan from himself and then paying himself interest", though no one seems to disapprove of this. The childlike Trusdale's simple-minded honesty, coupled with the shambolic nature of the judicial process, the absence of the silver dollar, and the townfolks' unruly determination to see Trusdale hanged, gradually convinces Barclay that he is innocent. Nonetheless, he is convicted, while all through the trial the sounds of a gallows being erected can be heard.

On the night before his execution Trusdale asks for steak and eggs with fries soaked in gravy and beer as his last meal, which Barclay pays for out of his own pocket. Trusdale then grows distressed, as he realizes that the food will never get a chance to pass naturally through his body before he dies. Firmly convinced of Trusdale's innocence and wanting one last chance to help him, Barclay tries to make him remember whether someone stole Trusdale's hat on the day of the murder. (No one at the trial could be sure whether he was wearing his hat when he left a local bar, and was last seen before the arrest). Trusdale tries but comes up with nothing.

The next day Barclay helps lead Trusdale up the steps towards the rope, which will hang him on the gallows before the assembled townsfolk. Trusdale panics and starts thrashing, almost knocking his guardians off of the steps, to the sadistic amusement of the crowd, which jeers at Trusdale. In the end he begs to be allowed to see the mountains before he dies, but the hood is pulled over his eyes and the trapdoor sprung while the priest reads Psalm 51, no one acknowledging his last request.

After the execution Barclay returns to the jail, sits in the cell where Trusdale spent his last days, and vomits into the bucket which had held Trusdale's last beer. Some hours later the local undertaker arrives and informs him that there's something he needs to see at the mortuary. When they arrive Barclay sees the missing silver dollar, which the undertaker discovered after Trusdale evacuated his bowels. Trusdale was, in fact, guilty, and had swallowed the dollar on becoming aware of the approaching posse at the start of the story, before swallowing it again every time he defecated in his cell. In wonderment at his former conviction that the man was innocent, Barclay says, "He went on saying he was innocent right to the end. He'll most likely stand at the throne of God saying the same thing." The story ends as the sound of a church congregation, singing the Doxology, is heard.

== See also ==
- Stephen King's short fiction bibliography
