= Moonlight Bay Trilogy =

Unfinished set of books by Dean Koontz

- Author: Dean Koontz
- Language: English
- Genre: Horror
- Publisher: Cemetery Dance Publications, Bantam Publishing

The Moonlight Bay Trilogy is an unfinished trilogy of three novels by Dean Koontz. They revolve around the mysterious events in Moonlight Bay, a fictitious Southern California town, that are investigated by the main character Christopher Snow, who suffers from the genetic disorder Xeroderma pigmentosum.

Only the first two books have been released; no release date is scheduled for the third novel. The books in the trilogy are:

- Fear Nothing,(1998), ISBN 0-7472-5832-5 (Paperback), ISBN 0-553-10664-3 (Hardback)
- Seize the Night,(1999), ISBN 0-7472-5833-3 (Paperback), ISBN 0-553-10665-1 (Hardback)
- Ride the Storm (Tentative title), (TBA)

According to a January 14, 2000 interview with Bookreporter.com, Dean Koontz was quoted as saying "I'm half way through Ride the Storm, the third Christopher Snow story, but another book will appear between Fear Nothing and Ride."

As of 2003, Koontz was still reportedly "halfway through" Ride the Storm.

In an interview at the end of 2017, Koontz says that he intends to finish Ride the Storm once he finishes the 7th book in his Jane Hawk series. The fifth and final book in the Jane Hawk series - The Night Window - was published on May 14, 2019 but there is still no definitive word on if or when Ride the Storm will be released.
