= George Winston (disambiguation) =

George Winston (1949–2023) was an American pianist.

George Winston may also refer to:

- George T. Winston (1852–1932), American educator
- George Winston, character in the novella Morality
- George Winston, the fictional United States Secretary of the Treasury in the Tom Clancy novel Executive Orders

== See also ==
- Winston George (born 1987), Guyanese sprinter
