= The Little Green God of Agony =

Short story by Stephen King

- Short story by Stephen King
- Country: United States
- Language: English
- Genre: Horror short story

Publication
- Published in: A Book of Horrors
- Publisher: Jo Fletcher Books
- Media type: Print
- Publication date: 2011

Chronology
Mile 81	The Dune

"The Little Green God of Agony" is a short story by Stephen King. It was originally published in 2011 as part of the anthology A Book of Horrors.

== Plot summary ==
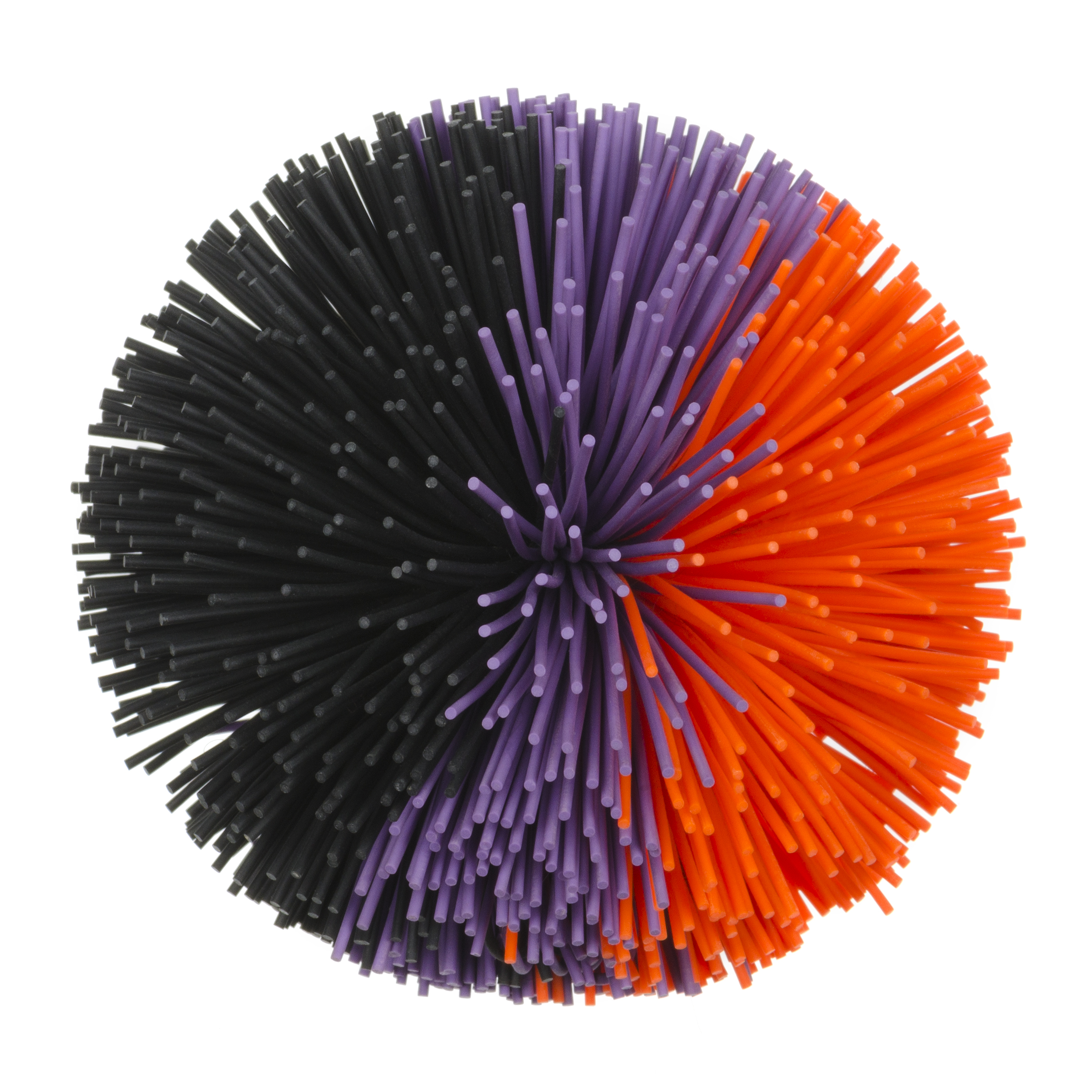
The titular God is described as resembling a green Koosh ball.

Vermont billionaire Andrew Newsome, the world's sixth richest man, has been bedridden with chronic pain since a plane crash two years prior. Newsome is attended by a private nurse, Kat MacDonald, who privately believes that Newsome is too cowardly to undergo the necessary pain to rehabilitate himself but says nothing as she is being paid a handsome salary. Newsome receives a visit from Reverend Rideout, who claims that his pain is caused by a "demon god". Rideout offers to expel the demon god–a process that will place his life at risk–in return for a fee of $750,000 (equivalent to $1,073,000 in 2025), which he intends to use to rebuild his church in Titusville, Arkansas, which has burned down.

After Newsome accepts Rideout's offer, a frustrated Kat accuses Newsome of being lazy and Rideout of being a fraud. Newsome initially fires her, but Rideout persuades him to allow her to watch the expulsion of the demon god, suggesting that Kat has become complacent to the suffering of her patients due to never having experienced severe pain herself. Rideout gives Kat a broom and Newsome's assistant Jensen a canister of pepper spray, instructing them to stun the creature and capture it in a specimen jar. The expulsion is also witnessed by Melissa, Newsome's housekeeper, and Tonya, Newsome's cook.

Rideout begins the expulsion, and a small, spikey, "bladderlike" green creature (which Kat likens to a Koosh ball) is expelled from Newsome, whose pain immediately ends. The strain of carrying out the exorcism gives Rideout a fatal heart attack. As the creature emerges from Newsome's mouth, a power cut throws the room into darkness before a backup generator activates; Jensen accidentally pepper sprays his own eyes, while Kat misses the creature with the broom. The creature attaches itself to Melissa's eye, causing her agonizing pain until Kat hits it with the broom and stamps on it. The story ends with the generator failing, plunging the room into darkness, with Kat then feeling the creature crawl onto her hand.

== Publication ==
According to King, "The Little Green God of Agony" is an attempt to provide closure in respect of lingering pain from his 1999 automotive accident. King has also described the story as "a tribute to the classic monster and old dark house stories." The story was originally published in 2011 as part of the anthology A Book of Horrors. In 2012, it was reprinted in the horror anthology The Best Horror of the Year: Volume Four. In 2015, it was reprinted in King's short fiction collection The Bazaar of Bad Dreams.

== Reception ==
Rocky Wood described "The Little Green God of Agony" as "a rollicking tale which picks up pace rapidly towards the end and has a satisfyingly creepy ending." Stephen Spignesi described the story as "superb". In 2012, the story was nominated for the Locus Award for Best Novella.

== Adaptations ==
In October 2012, "The Little Green God of Agony" was adapted into a serial webcomic by artist Dennis Calero.

In August 2020, it was announced that Lionsgate was developing a film adaptation of "The Little Green God of Agony", with the script being written by Ian B. Goldberg and Richard Naing.

== See also ==
- Stephen King short fiction bibliography
