= Seize the Night (novel) =

1998 novel by Dean Koontz

- Cover of Seize the Night
- Author: Dean Koontz
- Cover artist: Tom Hallman
- Language: English
- Series: Moonlight Bay Trilogy
- Genre: Science fiction, suspense
- Publisher: Cemetery Dance Publications (hardcover) Bantam Publishing (paperback)
- Publication date: 1998
- Publication place: United States
- Media type: Print (Hardcover and Paperback)
- Pages: 480 pp
- ISBN: 1-881475-44-1 (hardcover); ISBN 0-553-58019-1 (paperback)
- Preceded by: Fear Nothing
- Followed by: Ride the Storm

Seize the Night is a novel written by the best-selling author Dean Koontz, released in 1998. The book is the second in a trilogy of books known as the Moonlight Bay Trilogy, involving Christopher Snow, who has the rare (but real) disease called XP (xeroderma pigmentosum). The first in the series is Fear Nothing and the third is tentatively titled Ride the Storm (release date unknown).

Seize the Night was originally released by Cemetery Dance Publications as two different limited edition hardcovers, both with different artwork on their front cover:

- A traycased lettered edition of 52 signed and lettered copies
- A slipcased limited edition of 698 signed and numbered copies

== Plot summary ==
Seize the Night begins a few months after Fear Nothing. It starts with Chris and his dog Orson happening upon Chris's ex-girlfriend, Lilly Wing, whose son Jimmy has just disappeared. Chris swears to Lilly he'll find Jimmy, and departs with Orson to begin the search. The trail leads them to Fort Wyvern, the abandoned military base Chris likes to explore. They search the base, but soon become separated, and Orson goes missing. Fearing for his dog's well-being, along with that of Jimmy, Chris calls his best friend Bobby Halloway to join him in the search and then sends his current girlfriend Sasha Goodall to Lilly's house to console her. Soon after calling them, Chris sees about thirty or so of the rhesus monkeys encountered towards the end of Fear Nothing and takes refuge from them in a nearby bungalow. The monkeys follow him in, and he is saved from being found by Bobby's arrival.

Bobby and Chris search the base, but find nothing except a few strange devices and rooms. After leaving, they stop by Lilly's house. Sasha and Chris head to their place, while Bobby heads off to Lilly's mother-in-law Jenna, to bring her back to Lilly's.

The next day, Chris calls Manuel Ramirez, the acting chief of police, to give him information about Jimmy Wing's kidnapper's vehicle. Getting no answer, he leaves a message for Manuel to call him after noon. Bobby stops by a bit later to say that Jimmy is not the only child missing.

Later, Manuel tells Chris in no uncertain terms to back off, while confiscating his and Bobby's guns and trashing his house. After he leaves, Roosevelt Frost arrives with his cat, Mungojerrie. They all leave and head out to an old road a few miles away where Sasha's coworker at the radio station, Doogie, meets up with them. They then head back to Fort Wyvern to continue the search for the children and Orson.

Chris and company head into the base, where Bobby is critically wounded in an ambush. He sends everyone else on to find the kids and Orson, and when they return with them in tow, Bobby dies. Chris, refusing to leave Bobby's body behind, demands it be taken with them on the way out. On the elevator ride back up, they actually encounter themselves at the top of the shaft, and Chris is able to stop Bobby's past self from being shot. With the past now altered, Bobby's body disappears from the elevator, and Chris takes the live Bobby with him out of the base to return Jimmy and the other kids to their parents.

== Reception ==
Charles de Lint found Seize the Night to be "an excellent, fast-paced, keeps-you-on-the-seat-of-your-pants adventure", but faulted it for "miss[ing] the depth of characterization I've come to expect in a Koontz novel."

== External links and references ==
- Seize the Night Book Review
- information on hardcover releases
- Seize the Night title listing at the Internet Speculative Fiction Database
