= The Gwendy Trilogy =

Novel trilogy by Richard Chizmar and Stephen King

The Gwendy Trilogy is a trilogy of horror and adventure American novellas and novels written by Richard Chizmar and Stephen King. The installments include Gwendy's Button Box (2017), Gwendy's Magic Feather (2019), and Gwendy's Final Task (2022).

== Books ==
Books in The Gwendy Trilogy
Title	Author(s)	U.S. release	Publisher	ISBN
Gwendy's Button Box	Stephen King and Richard Chizmar	February 28, 2017	Cemetery Dance Publications	978-1-58767-610-9
Gwendy's Magic Feather	Richard Chizmar	November 19, 2019	Cemetery Dance Publications	978-1-58767-731-1
Gwendy's Final Task	Stephen King and Richard Chizmar	February 15, 2022	Cemetery Dance Publications	978-1-58767-801-1

== Gwendy's Button Box ==
Gwendy's Button Box
- First edition cover
- Author: Stephen King, Richard Chizmar
- Audio read by: Maggie Siff
- Language: English
- Series: The Gwendy's Button Box Trilogy
- Genre: Horror
- Publisher: Cemetery Dance
- Publication date: May 16, 2017
- Publication place: United States
- Media type: Print (Hardcover)
- Pages: 175
- ISBN: 978-1-58767-610-9
- Followed by: Gwendy's Magic Feather

Gwendy's Button Box is a horror novella by American writers Stephen King and Richard Chizmar. It was announced by Entertainment Weekly on February 28, 2017. The American edition published by Cemetery Dance included illustrations by Keith Minnion. The French edition, released by Le Livre de Poche in September 2018, reproduced those illustrations with brand new ones by the same artist.

A sequel titled Gwendy's Magic Feather, penned solely by Chizmar, was released in November 2019. In November 2020, Chizmar announced that he and King were writing a third installment in the series titled Gwendy's Final Task, this time as a full-length novel. It was published in 2022. After a book box release, containing all three installments, the trilogy was named The Gwendy Trilogy.

=== Plot ===
The story takes place in King's fictional town of Castle Rock in 1974. Twelve-year-old Gwendy Peterson encounters a stranger in dark clothes and a black hat who invites her to "palaver."

=== Conception ===
"I had a story I couldn't finish, and [Chizmar] showed me the way home with style and panache," King said in a statement. In describing the writing process, Richard Chizmar said, "Steve sent me the first chunk of a short story. I added quite a bit and sent it back to him. He did a pass, then bounced it back to me for another pass. Then, we did the same thing all over again – one more draft each. Next thing you know, we had a full-length novella on our hands. We took a free hand in rewriting each other and adding new ideas and characters. The whole process took about a month."

== Gwendy's Magic Feather ==
Gwendy's Magic Feather
- Cover
- Authors: Richard Chizmar
- Illustrator: Keith Minnion
- Cover artist: Ben Baldwin
- Language: English
- Series: Gwendy's Button Box Trilogy
- Genre: Thriller Novel
- Publisher: Cemetery Dance
- Publication date: November 19, 2019
- Publication place: United States
- Media type: Print (Hardcover)
- Pages: 330
- ISBN: 978-1-58767-731-1
- Preceded by: Gwendy's Button Box
- Followed by: Gwendy's Final Task

Gwendy's Magic Feather is a 2019 thriller novella by Richard Chizmar. It is the second in the trilogy. The story, set in 1999, revolves around the title character, Gwendy Peterson, now a thirty-seven-year-old United States representative from Maine, who one day finds the Button Box again. In her hometown, Castle Rock, in which she soon travels to, Gwendy must also try to find two missing teenage girls that have mysteriously disappeared.

== Gwendy's Final Task ==
Gwendy's Final Task
- First edition cover
- Authors: Stephen King and Richard Chizmar
- Audio read by: Marin Ireland
- Cover artist: Ben Baldwin
- Language: English
- Series: The Gwendy Trilogy
- Genre: Adventure novel
- Publisher: Cemetery Dance
- Publication date: February 15, 2022
- Publication place: United States
- Media type: Print (Hardcover)
- Pages: 412
- ISBN: 978-1-58767-801-1
- Preceded by: Gwendy's Magic Feather

Gwendy's Final Task was published on February 15, 2022 and written by Chizmar and King as the third installment of the trilogy. Set primarily in the future year of 2026 on the MF-1 Space Station, it revolves around the eponymous Gwendy Peterson, a sixty-four-year-old United States Senator from Maine. It has been twenty years since Richard Farris relieved her of the button box, but now it is back and she must face overwhelming obstacles before she can destroy it once and for all.

=== Plot ===
Gwendy Peterson is tasked by Richard Farris to dispose of the button box in outer space, the only place he believes the box can go to keep the world safe. Since Gwendy last had the box in her possession, it has increased in its power to do evil. Farris blames the COVID-19 pandemic on one possessor's misuse of the box.

Once the box is in Gwendy's possession, she encounters evil forces that seem determined to keep her from achieving her goal. First, her husband Ryan is killed in a freak hit and run accident when Gwendy is campaigning for the United States Senate. Soon afterward, Gwendy begins suffering the debilitating symptoms of early-onset Alzheimer's. During her trip into space, Gwendy is informed that her house caught fire. She believes the people who want to save the box and use it to harm others intentionally set the fire when they discovered the box was not there.

The novel begins in the present tense with the crew of the Eagle-19 Heavy launching into space. Gwendy is on board as the first U.S. senator to ride to the MF-1 space station. The chapters that are set in the present are interspersed with chapters set in the past to give the reader background. Even though Gwendy was ready to step aside from politics, she was persuaded to run for a Senate seat in Maine against a man who supported lies and ideas that would harm the country.

It was while Gwendy was in the midst of campaigning for the Senate that Farris brought the box back to her. He told her that she needed to dispose of the box because it was becoming too dangerous. He gave her instructions that told how to dispose of it. Shortly after Gwendy was given the box, her husband, Ryan, was killed. The police investigating the hit and run accident claimed they had no witnesses or video footage. After an encounter with Gareth Winston, a billionaire who bought a seat on the same rocket as Gwendy, Gwendy was convinced Ryan had been murdered. Gwendy's friend, Charlotte Morgan, deputy director of the Central Intelligence Agency, had her agents investigate the crash. She determined Ryan's death was intentional and that the police had been bribed to claim they had no witnesses.

Despite her husband's death, Gwendy went on to win the Senate seat. She used her relationship with Charlotte to arrange a ride on the Eagle-19 Heavy to the space station. While there, Gwendy planned to participate in a spacewalk where she would send the button box into deep space with the help of a small rocket.

In the present, as Gwendy is traveling to the space station, she learns that Winston is part of a conspiracy to keep Gwendy from disposing of the button box. As Winston tries to steal the box from Gwendy, he tells her that he had been promised by the low men in yellow coats that if he brought them the box, he would be awarded his own world over which he could reign.

Gwendy foils Winston's plan to steal the box with the help of Adesh Patel, a member of the crew Gwendy trusted and with whom Farris had decided to communicate telepathically. Gwendy kills Winston to keep him from taking the box and killing her and the rest of the crew. Gwendy later explains to Kathy Lundgren, the operation commander, the power of the button box and the need to dispose of it. She tells Kathy that since she has been the proprietor of the box for the third time, she has been suffering with symptoms of early-onset Alzheimer's disease. She fears that by the time she returns to Earth, she will no longer know her name.

To keep from suffering the further debilitating symptoms of Alzheimer's, Gwendy tells Kathy that she wants to go with the box and the rocket. Kathy agrees to Gwendy's plan only because it will allow her to explain Gwendy's and Winston's disappearances as the result of an unsupervised spacewalk. Also, the Tet Corporation, the builder of the spacecraft, will not have to deal with any questions about Winston's death.

As Gwendy soars into space with the small rocket, she thinks about the sort of death Farris told her she would have. While many of Farris's predictions about her life were correct, this one appears to be off course. She accuses Farris of lying to her. As she loses oxygen in her suit, Gwendy imagines herself as an old lady in her childhood bed, surrounded by her friends as she dies.
