= Ride the Storm (novel) =

Planned novel by Dean Koontz

- Author: Dean Koontz
- Language: English
- Series: Moonlight Bay Trilogy
- Genre: Suspense, Mystery novel
- Publication place: United States
- Preceded by: Seize the Night

Ride the Storm is the long-planned final book in the Moonlight Bay Trilogy, to be written by American author Dean Koontz. The book is the third installment featuring Christopher Snow, a young man who has the rare (but real) disease called XP (xeroderma pigmentosum). Book one, Fear Nothing, was released in 1998, and book two, Seize the Night, was released in 1999.

== History of delays ==
According to a January 14, 2000, interview with Bookreporter.com, Dean Koontz was quoted as saying "I'm half way through Ride the Storm, the third Christopher Snow story, but another book will appear between False Memory and Ride."

As of 2003, Koontz was still "halfway through" Ride the Storm.

In a Frequently Asked Questions (FAQ) pamphlet delivered with Koontz' official email newsletter "Useless News", Koontz writes: "The third Chris Snow novel — after FEAR NOTHING and SEIZE THE NIGHT — will be written, God willing, but has been delayed because other ideas demand attention first. RIDE THE STORM, the third Snow, has been cooking for a long time, but it's a delicate dish to develop."

In an interview at the end of 2017, Koontz says that he intends to finish Ride the Storm once he finishes the 7th book in his Jane Hawk series.

As of 2018, the FAQ on Koontz' website says that "there will be the third Chris Snow book; you can count on it, if I live long enough."

On December 13, 2019, Koontz posted on his Twitter page: "I liked the 2nd Chris Snow novel. My publisher didn’t. Maybe one day I’ll get the rights back to the first 2 and be able to finish the third."

In a Goodreads reply and Facebook post Koontz stated: "Maybe I can write one more Chris Snow not as the third in the trilogy, but as a nice fat standalone that reprises the background of the first two in a fresh way and carries the characters to a conclusion. It’ll be such a complex project that I’ll need a full year for it, but I’ve begun to get ahead of deadlines and might be able to manage it."
