= Fear Nothing =

1998 novel by Dean Koontz

- First UK edition
- Author: Dean Koontz
- Cover artist: Tom Hallman-US edition
- Language: English
- Series: Moonlight Bay Trilogy
- Genre: Suspense, Mystery novel
- Publisher: Cemetery Dance Publications; Dell Books (US); Headline (UK)
- Publication date: 1998
- Publication place: United States
- Media type: Print
- Pages: 448
- ISBN: 1-881475-27-1
- Followed by: Seize the Night

Fear Nothing is a novel released in 1998 by the best-selling author Dean Koontz. The book is the first installment in what is reported to be a three-part series of books, known as the Moonlight Bay Trilogy, featuring Christopher Snow, who suffers from the rare (but real) disease called XP (xeroderma pigmentosum). The second in the trilogy, Seize the Night, was released in 1999. No release date has yet been set for the release of the third book titled Ride the Storm. Fear Nothing is in several ways a successor to the 1987 Koontz novel Watchers. It was nominated for the Bram Stoker Award for Best Novel.

== Plot summary ==
Fear Nothing, told in the first person, follows 24 hours of Christopher Snow's life, as he discovers and attempts to unravel a mysterious and seemingly endless conspiracy centered on a military compound called Fort Wyvern. The book opens with Christopher Snow going to visit his dying father at the hospital. As Snow crosses the hospital to his father's room the lights are thoughtfully dimmed to protect him in his condition. His father's dying words of advice are "Fear nothing, Chris. Fear nothing".

As he leaves the hospital Snow accidentally and serendipitously watches as his father's body is switched with that of a drifter. Following the people taking the body to the funeral home, Christopher is nearly caught and a manhunt begins. Christopher is chased to the outskirts of town and only his knowledge of the landscape of night keeps him ahead of his pursuers.

Later, upon returning home, Christopher finds his father's gun on his bed, and an urgent message on his answering machine to call Angela Ferryman, a nurse and lifelong family friend. Orson, the family dog, is uncharacteristically digging holes in the garden. Christopher stops the pet and brings Orson along with him to see Angela, who reveals a strange story about a night several years ago when she encountered a strange rhesus monkey in her house, a terrifying creature which is recovered by mysterious military personnel. Before more is revealed, Angela is killed while in another room, and Chris barely escapes when unknown assailants set the house on fire.

Christopher sets off on his bicycle (with Orson following) to the home of his best friend Bobby Halloway, a surfer who lives in a cottage on the edge of town, near to the sea. Upon hearing Chris’ story, Bobby urges Christopher to leave the mystery alone and continue life as normal. The friends share some food and a few beers (including the dog). Their meal is interrupted by Sasha, Christopher's girlfriend, who calls with a message from another friend of Christopher. The message sends him and Orson off on a race into the mist of the night, where they are followed by a group of mutated rhesus monkeys which are led by a shadowy figure of a half-man, half-beast.

As Christopher meets with Roosevelt Frost, an ex-football player who now focuses on a talent of communication with animals, Christopher is again warned off his investigation but now feels compelled to unravel this mystery. Frost hints at unusual, uncommonly intelligent animals escaping from the military base, including cats and dogs. He later insinuates to Christopher that his dog Orson is most likely from the military base labs. He cryptically mentions that Christopher is protected by the legacy of his mother.
