= Acts of Love =

Acts of Love may refer to:

- Acts of Love, a 1978 novel by Elia Kazan
- Acts of Love (film), a 2021 docu-fiction film
- Acts of Love, an alternate title for the 1996 film Carried Away
- Acts of Love (album), a 1985 album of poems by Penny Rimbaud
- "Acts of Love" (Knots Landing), a 1982 television episode

== See also ==
- Act of Love (disambiguation)
