= Stationary Bike =

- Short story by Stephen King
- Country: United States
- Language: English
- Genre: Horror

Publication
- Published in: From the Borderlands, Just After Sunset
- Publication type: Anthology
- Publisher: Scribner
- Media type: Hardcover
- Publication date: 2003

Chronology
Rest Stop	—

"Stationary Bike" is a short story by the American writer Stephen King, originally published in the fifth edition of From the Borderlands in 2003. In 2008, it was republished in King's collection Just After Sunset.

== Plot ==
The story opens with Richard Sifkitz, a widowed commercial artist, visiting his doctor and staring at the results of his physical. Richard's cholesterol is dangerously high, largely due to his constant intake of fast food. The doctor tells him an interesting anecdote in relation to the number. He likens Richard's metabolism to a team of workmen who clear away the various junk foods that Richard ingests. As Richard ages, these metabolic workmen tire out and begin to slow down, resulting in heart trouble. This metaphor strikes Richard and he ultimately becomes somewhat obsessed with the idea.

Determined to lose weight, Richard sets up a stationary bike in his basement. At first, he hangs a map of the United States on the wall, imagining himself traveling to a foreign destination with each mile. As time passes, though, the notion of the metabolic workmen enters his mind again and he paints a bizarre landscape on a mural. His mural depicts four tired workers clearing a fat-laden road. Richard's exercise soon produces results: he loses weight, and his cholesterol plummets. One day, Richard has a horrible nightmare about one of the workmen committing suicide. He is driven to put the imagery of his dream into drawing, but that isn't enough to give him peace. These events cause the mural Richard has painted to transform, warping into a more nightmarish appearance with each passing day. Despite these warning signs, though, Richard cannot stop exercising. Slowly, Richard enters a trance when he rides, and seems to enter the mysterious landscape as he does.

Desperate with fear, Richard even goes so far as to try taking the machine apart. However, he mysteriously finds himself riding on the bike "one last time". Suddenly, he is run off the road by a pick-up truck. Soon, Richard finds himself face to face with the three remaining workmen. The workmen deftly disassemble the stationary bike, then return to speak with Richard. They angrily accuse him of ruining their lives; without a stream of fatty foods, they have stopped receiving income for their work. The workmen list their expenses, and explain that the loss of income drove their fellow member to commit suicide. Richard realizes that the men are conglomerations of people he has met before in life, and tries to tell them that they're nothing more than figments of his own fantasy. However, the workmen don't believe in his explanation. Still unnerved by this strange experience, Richard agrees to relax his diet. On impulse, he makes one request - he wants a cap that the workmen wear (blood red, with the word "LIPID" written on it). Before departing, the workmen admonish Richard to take care of himself... but not too much. As he steps back into reality, Richard begins to wonder when he will convince himself that the strange experience was all just a dream.

The story jumps forward to a few weeks later. Richard has forgotten much of the experience, but it has affected him. For instance, he still eats mostly healthy foods, but allows himself a few indulgences (like apple pie a la mode), and obviously no longer rides the bike. When his mail arrives one afternoon, he sees a package which contains a baseball cap just like the one worn by the workers. He smiles as he dons the cap and prepares to go to work painting.

== Film adaptation ==
In 2012, the film production company Gwynplaine Films and its associates adapted the story into a short film, Bike. The film starred Stephen Hope-Wynne, an independent cinema and TV veteran.

In 2019 The Blaenau Gwent Film Academy produced a short film adapted from the story.

In 2022, Verloren Productions adapted the story into a film title, The Stationary Bike. The film was directed by Ayem Walters. It had a successful run in the film festival circuit.

== Audiobook ==
An audiobook version, read by Ron McLarty, was adapted from Stephen King's work "Stationary Bike" and released on CD in June 2006.

== See also ==
- Short fiction by Stephen King
