= The Dune =

Short story by Stephen King

- Short story by Stephen King
- Country: United States
- Language: English
- Genre: Horror short story

Publication
- Published in: Granta
- Publisher: Sigrid Rausing
- Media type: Print, digital
- Publication date: 2011

Chronology
"The Little Green God of Agony"	In the Tall Grass

"The Dune" is a short horror story by Stephen King, first published in the fall 2011 issue of Granta, and later collected in his 2015 short story collection, The Bazaar of Bad Dreams.

== Plot summary ==
In Florida, a retired Florida Supreme Court Judge named Harvey Beecher has a lifelong obsession with a mysterious sand dune on an unnamed island, a short distance off the Gulf coastline of his family's property. Since he was a child and first ventured onto the island looking for buried treasure, he has seen the names of people who are going to die within a month written in the sand. Beecher's lawyer, Anthony Wayland, visits to help Beecher finish his last will. While drawing up the document, Beecher tells about his most recent visit to the dune and the grim recollection of his lifelong experiences with it. The name that Beecher found written in the dune is the reason he now wants his will finished quickly. Wayland assumes Beecher has seen his own name in the sand, but later it is implied the name was Wayland's.

== Publication ==
"The Dune" was first published in the fall 2011 issue of Granta. In 2015, it was collected in King's short story collection, The Bazaar of Bad Dreams.

== Reception ==
As of March 2026, readers of the web site Goodreads.com have registered 68,458 ratings for the story, with an average score of 3.91 out of 5 stars.
