= Glenn Chadbourne =

American artist

- Born: October 19, 1959 (age 66); Damariscotta, Maine
- Occupations: Artist, illustrator, writer
- Writing career
- Period: 1988–present
- Genres: Horror, fantasy
- Website: glennchadbourne.com

Glenn Chadbourne (born October 19, 1959) is an American artist. He lives in Newcastle, Maine. He is best known for his work in the horror and fantasy genres, having created covers and illustrated books and magazines for publishers such as Cemetery Dance Publications, Subterranean Press, and Earthling Publications. Chadbourne is known for his sense of humour and down to earth manner, as well as the stark honesty of his work.

Glenn Chadbourne attended Lincoln Academy before continuing his education at The Portland School of Art. He also attended the University of Maine at Augusta, as well as the University of Southern Maine.

His first published work was in the late 1980s for the Stephen King related newsletter called Castle Rock. He won a contest that called for artists to submit something Stephen King related.

He wrote, illustrated, and self-published a few comics called ChillVille and Farmer Fiend's Horror Harvest in the early 1990s. He eventually met Rick Hautala and was asked to illustrate his short story collection Bedbugs. After Cemetery Dance Publications printed Bedbugs in 1999, things began to click for Mr. Chadbourne, and he has since illustrated work for many of the top names in the horror genre.

He illustrated The Secretary of Dreams: Volumes 1 & 2, graphic collections of Stephen King stories that were published by Cemetery Dance Publications in 2006 and 2010. Volume 1 was published in three limited editions.

== Selected works ==
=== Books ===
- Bedbugs by Rick Hautala (Cemetery Dance Publications, 1999)
- The Road to the Dark Tower by Bev Vincent (Cemetery Dance Publications, 2005) ISBN 1-58767-104-2 (also released as a 52 copy lettered edition that came with an original Dark Tower drawing by Glenn Chadbourne)
- The Illustrated Stephen King Trivia Book by Brian Freeman & Bev Vincent (Cemetery Dance Publications, 2005) ISBN 1-58767-116-6 (also released as a 52 copy lettered edition that came with a piece of Glenn Chadbourne ORIGINAL artwork that was used in the book)
- Windows by Ray Garton (Cemetery Dance "Signature Series", 2006)
- Weed Species by Jack Ketchum (Black and white interior artwork by Glenn Chadbourne) (Cemetery Dance Publications, 2006)
- Bloodstained Oz by Christopher Golden and James A. Moore (500 numbered copies released by Earthling Publications, 2006) (also released as a limited lettered edition of 26 copies each with an original color illustration by Glenn Chadbourne)
- The King and other Stories by Joe R. Lansdale (Subterranean Press, 2006)
- Matinee at the Flame by Christopher Fahy (Overlook Connection Press, 2006)
- Lords of the Razor anthology edited by Joe R. Lansdale (Subterranean Press, 2006)
- The Secretary of Dreams: Volume 1 by Stephen King (Cemetery Dance Publications, 2006)
- Ghost Trap by Dave Lowell (Flights of Imagination, 2007)
- The Colorado Kid (the Glenn Chadbourne limited edition) by Stephen King (PS Publishing, 2007)
- Dead Earth: The Green Dawn by Mark Justice and David T. Wilbanks with an introduction by Gary A. Braunbeck (PS Publishing, 2007)
- "1922" in Full Dark, No Stars by Stephen King (Cemetery Dance Publications, 2010)
- The Dark Man by Stephen King (Cemetery Dance Publications, 2013)
- Deadman's Road by Joe R. Lansdale (Subterranean Press, 2013)
- A Pair of Aces a short story collection and screenplay by Joe R. Lansdale and Neal Barrett Jr., (Macabre Ink Production, 2014)
- The Stephen King Companion: Four Decades of Fear from the Master of Horror by George Beahm (Author), Michael Whelan (Illustrator), Glenn Chadbourne (Illustrator), Stephen Spignesi (Introduction) St. Martin's Press, (2015)
- Freeman, Brian James; Chadbourne, Glenn (May 2018). The Zombie Who Cried Human. Cemetery Dance Publications. ISBN 978-1-58767-686-4.

=== Comic books ===
- Fang #3 (1992, Tangram Publishing) (Features a ChillVille preview)
- ChillVille (AKA "Welcome to Chillville") (1993, Tangram Publishing) (1 issue)
- ChillVille (Maine Stream Comics) (1 issue)
- Farmer Fiend's Horror Harvest (1 issue Feb 1995; "Work 'Till You're Dead Graphics")
- Blood for the Muse: ChillVille (published by Chanting Monk Studios) (2 issues, 1997) (reprints Tangram Publishing's Chillville spread over two issues) (issue #1 has a preview of "The Oaken Door," which was eventually published in full by Grave Tales #2, see below)
- Blood for the Muse: Agony Exctasy Tragedy (1998, Blind Wolf Studios) (1 issue) (Features "Tragedy Brings Her")
- Dreg written by Terry M. West (only 200 preview copies were made) (1997, "Dark Muse Productions") (1 issue)
- Cemetery Dance Presents Grave Tales (available as limited edition hardcovers and regular comic book style):

- Issue 1 (art for "Late Summer Shadows" by Rick Hautala) (1999)
- Issue 2 (art for "The Corn Dolly" by Al Sarrantonio & "The Oaken Door" by Daniel D. Burr) (2000)
- Issue 3 (art for "The Cutty Black Sow" by Thomas F. Monteleone) (2001)
- Issue 4 (art for "Legend" by Garrett Peck) (2005)
- Issue 5 (art for "Snowmen" by Kealan Patrick Burke) (2008)
- Issue 6 (art for "Junkyard of the Damned" by Robert Morrish) (scheduled 2008)

=== Murals ===
All located in Lewiston, Maine

- DaVinci's Eatery
- Lewiston Pawn Shop
- Carousel Marina's Whale's Tale Restaurant
- People mural, 379 Lisbon Street
