= The Bazaar of Bad Dreams =

Short story collection by Stephen King

- First edition cover
- Author: Stephen King
- Language: English
- Genre: Horror, Literary Fiction
- Publisher: Scribner
- Publication date: November 3, 2015
- Publication place: United States
- Media type: Print (hardcover)
- Pages: 495
- ISBN: 978-1501111679
- Preceded by: Full Dark, No Stars
- Followed by: If It Bleeds

The Bazaar of Bad Dreams is a short fiction collection by Stephen King, published on November 3, 2015. This is King's sixth collection of short stories and his tenth collection overall. One of the stories, "Obits", won the 2016 Edgar Award for best short story, and the collection itself won the 2015 Shirley Jackson Award for best collection. The paperback edition, released on October 18, 2016, includes a bonus short story, "Cookie Jar", which was published in 2016 in VQR.

== Stories ==
#	Title	Originally published in	Type
1	Mile 81	Mile 81 e-book (2011)	Novella
2	"Premium Harmony"	November 9, 2009 issue of The New Yorker	Short story
3	"Batman and Robin Have an Altercation"	September 2012 issue of Harper's Magazine	Short story
4	"The Dune"	Fall 2011 issue of Granta	Short story
5	"Bad Little Kid"	Previously unpublished in English	Short story
6	"A Death"	March 9, 2015 issue of The New Yorker	Short story
7	"The Bone Church"	November 2009 issue of Playboy	Poem
8	Morality	July 2009 issue of Esquire	Novella
9	"Afterlife"	June 2013 issue of Tin House	Short story
10	Ur	Ur e-book (2009)	Novella
11	"Herman Wouk Is Still Alive"	May 2011 issue of The Atlantic	Short story
12	"Under the Weather"	Paperback edition of Full Dark, No Stars (2011)	Short story
13	Blockade Billy	Blockade Billy (2010)	Novella
14	"Mister Yummy"	Previously unpublished	Short story
15	"Tommy"	March 2010 issue of Playboy	Poem
16	"The Little Green God of Agony"	A Book of Horrors (2011)	Short story
17	"That Bus Is Another World"	August 2014 issue of Esquire	Short story
18	"Obits"	Previously unpublished	Short story
19	"Drunken Fireworks"	Drunken Fireworks audiobook (2015)	Novella
20	"Summer Thunder"	Turn Down the Lights (2013)	Short story

== Background information ==
In a letter posted on Stephen King's official site in June 2014, King announced that he would possibly be publishing a "book of new stories" in the fall of 2015, following the publication of Finders Keepers. In an interview with the Toronto Sun on November 6, 2014, King announced the title of the collection and offered more details, saying "[I]n the fall of 2015 there will be a new collection of stories called The Bazaar of Bad Dreams, which'll collect about 20 short tales. It should be a pretty fat book." In February and March 2015, King personally, and via his assistant, confirmed the collection will include "Bad Little Kid" (published in 2014 as an e-book in French and German languages only as a gift to King's European fans), "Ur" (heavily revised), "Drunken Fireworks", and "A Death". The complete list of twenty stories was announced on King's website on April 20. Throughout May, King's official site revealed the cover in five stages, with the final cover being unveiled on May 22. The Bazaar of Bad Dreams omits contemporaneous stories published by King in collaboration with his son Joe Hill (Throttle and In the Tall Grass) and Stewart O'Nan (A Face in the Crowd).

== Adaptations ==
In November 2025, Intrinsic Value Films began sales of a film adaptation for the story "Mister Yummy" at the American Film Market. The screenplay is written by Troy Blake. In June 2026, Ben Young was hired to direct the film.

== See also ==
- Stephen King short fiction bibliography
- Unpublished and uncollected works by Stephen King
