= False Memory (novel) =

1999 novel by Dean Koontz

- First (limited) edition
- Author: Dean Koontz
- Publisher: Cemetery Dance Publications and Bantam Books
- Publication date: 1999
- ISBN: 0-553-10666-X

False Memory is a horror novel by the American author Dean Koontz, released in 1999.

== Editions ==
False Memory was first released by Cemetery Dance Publications as a limited edition hardcover (ISBN 1-881475-85-9) that came in two different versions:

- A limited edition of 698 signed, numbered, and slipcased copies (signed by Dean Koontz and Phil Parks who created the illustrations for the Cemetery Dance versions).
- A lettered edition of 52 signed, lettered, and traycased copies (also signed by Dean Koontz and Phil Parks)

== Plot ==
Martie Rhodes helps her friend Susan Jagger, who has agoraphobia, attend visits to psychologist Dr. Ahriman. Martie's husband, Dusty, tries to help his brother Skeet by providing employment in his painting business. Skeet, who had been in drug rehabilitation previously, gets high again and attempts suicide by jumping off a roof. Dusty falls off the roof while saving Skeet and decides to take his brother back to rehab.

Martie suddenly develops a mysterious case of autophobia and returns home to find herself frightened by her own reflection. Later, her condition worsens, and soon she becomes afraid of pointed objects, although she is actually afraid of the harm she might cause with them. When Dusty leaves Skeet at the rehab center, he notices a shadow lurking in the window of his brother's room. Strange things start to happen to both Dusty and Martie, involving Skeet, Martie's autophobia, and hypnotism.

The couple eventually discovers that they have both been progressively brainwashed and programmed to obey Dr. Ahriman, a sexual psychopath who drugs and indoctrinates his patients, then repeatedly rapes them or orders them to commit murders or suicide for his amusement. Dr. Ahriman orders Susan to commit suicide by slitting her wrists after discovering that she videotaped him having sex with her. The doctor has also programmed Skeet, causing his inability to fully recover from drug use and distorted thinking. Dr. Ahriman establishes control, sending patients almost instantly into a detached state of consciousness by stating a name and then reading them a haiku. He tries to justify this by stating that, by ordering certain patients to commit horrific crimes—mass murders, bombings, and random shootings—he can force legislation in order to make the world a "better place".

Dr. Ahriman is eventually killed by another patient, who had a fear of Keanu Reeves, based on his character in The Matrix. The woman believes that Dr. Ahriman is one of the Machine agents trying to control her. Dusty and Martie receive a substantial inheritance from Susan's will and slowly begin to restore their shattered lives.

== Reception ==
Michael Harris of the Los Angeles Times praised the first third of False Memory for its suspense and tone, but felt that the rest of the novel was more predictable and less believable. A reviewer for Publishers Weekly agreed that it resembled some of Koontz's earlier novels, but described it as "an expertly crafted, ornate suspenser" that fans of the author would enjoy. Some reviewers felt that the novel, which was Koontz's longest work to date, would have been more impactful if it was shorter. Writing for Booklist, Ray Olson described the book as "having so many pages and so little plot", but conceded that it was an engaging read.

The audiobook, narrated by the American actor Stephen Lang, was positively reviewed by Kristen L. Smith of Library Journal, particularly for Lang's impression of Dr. Ahriman.
