= Morality (novella) =

2009 novella by Stephen King

- Author: Stephen King
- Language: English
- Genre: Psychological thriller, crime
- Published in: Esquire, Blockade Billy, The Bazaar of Bad Dreams
- Publisher: Esquire, Cemetery Dance, Charles Scribner's Sons
- Publication date: July, 2009
- Publication place: United States
- Media type: Print
- Preceded by: The Bone Church
- Followed by: Afterlife

Morality is a novella by American writer Stephen King published in the July 2009 issue of Esquire. It was then included as a bonus story in Blockade Billy, a novella published on May 25, 2010, and later collected and re-introduced in the November 3, 2015 anthology The Bazaar of Bad Dreams. In the latter publication, King revealed that the story was inspired by issues of moral philosophy in his own life, back when he was a struggling student and would occasionally shoplift or write other students' essays (an academic offence) to make ends meet. Morality received the 2009 Shirley Jackson Award for Best Novelette.

== Plot summary ==
Chad and Nora Callahan are suffering from financial difficulties brought on by lack of employment and low-paying jobs. While they are seemingly frustrated with the influx of monthly bills and other expenses, they remain largely optimistic about the future. Chad hopes to supplement their income by writing a book based on his experiences as a substitute teacher, while Nora, a nurse, works full-time for a retired clergyman named George Winston, who is partially paralyzed and uses a wheelchair after suffering from a stroke.

Nora's time spent with Winston is largely uneventful, until one day he offers Nora a solution to her money problems. Winston says that he has lived his life largely without sin and seeks to experience one major sin before he dies. However, he is unable to leave his house given his current condition, making committing any worthwhile sin impossible without aid. Winston states that he intends to commit a sin vicariously through Nora's actions and effectively "doubl[ing] his sin quotient" in the eyes of God. He makes it clear that for Nora's help and assumption of risk in this deed, he will pay her a total of $200,000.

Initially, after Winston reveals what the sin involves, Nora is appalled and assumes that he must be insane. After discussing the pros and cons of the offer with Chad—and reasoning that with the money they would be able to pay off all their debts and move to Vermont—Nora agrees to the proposal. After committing the act with Chad, Nora returns to Winston with a videotape documenting their efforts. While viewing the tape, it's revealed that the sin Winston chose to commit consisted of Nora going up to a small child in a park in broad daylight and punching him in the face, causing the child to suffer a bloody nose.

Seemingly satisfied with the outcome of Nora's actions, Winston agrees to pay her the money. He supposes that Nora will no longer wish to work for him now that she has seen his true face. Nora says she finds the whole situation repulsive and wonders why Winston would want to commit such a senseless act. Shortly afterward, she learns that Winston has committed suicide. Nora wonders about the videotape and whether it will be discovered.

As time passes, Chad and Nora are wracked with guilt over their complicity. Their optimism wanes as their fear of exposure increases. Chad starts drinking, while Nora has two affairs and develops a tendency for masochistic satisfaction during sex. They eventually divorce. Chad blames the failure and poor quality of his book on guilt and Nora's lack of faith in his writing talent. Nora is happy to be rid of Chad and begins working full-time at a hospital. Nora finds an old book titled The Basis of Morality in a used bookstore; she had previously seen it in Winston's study. After reading through it, Nora sadly concludes that there is little or nothing in the book that she didn't already know.

== See also ==
- Stephen King short fiction bibliography
