= Neile Graham =

Canadian-American poet and scholar

- Born: October 8, 1958 (age 67); Winnipeg, Manitoba, Canada
- Occupations: Poet, scholar, program administer
- Writing career
- Language: English
- Notable awards: WFA–Non-prof (2017)

Neile Graham (born October 8, 1958) is a poet and scholar. She was born in Winnipeg, Manitoba, and currently lives in Seattle in the United States.

Graham serves as administrator for both the PhD program in Built Environments and interdisciplinary certificates in Urban Design and Historic Preservation at the College of Built Environments of the University of Washington. She also administers the Clarion West Writers Workshop.

== Awards ==
- 2017 World Fantasy Special Award—Non-professional for excellence in the genre as Director of Clarion West Writers Workshop

== Bibliography ==
- —— (1983). Seven Robins. Penumbra Press.
- —— (1994). Spells for Clear Vision. Brick Books.
- —— (1995). Sheela-Na-Gig. Reference West.
- —— (2000). Blood Memory. Buschek Books.
- —— (2019). The Walk She Takes. MoonPath Press.
