= That Bus Is Another World =

Short story by Stephen King

- Short story by Stephen King
- Country: United States
- Language: English

Publication
- Published in: Esquire (August 2014); The Bazaar of Bad Dreams
- Publication type: Print
- Publisher: Hearst Communications
- Media type: Magazine, Hardback & Paperback
- Publication date: 2014 (first publication)

"That Bus Is Another World" is a horror short story written by Stephen King and first published in the August 2014 edition of Esquire. It was subsequently collected in his 2015 short story collection The Bazaar of Bad Dreams. Stephen King's experience in traffic in Paris inspired the story.

== Plot ==
The main story follows a man named Wilson from Birmingham, Alabama who recently travelled by plane up to New York for an important business meeting with what is described as one of the top advertising firms of the Internet age, Market Forward. On arrival, Wilson quickly runs into some bad luck when his luggage gets misplaced at the airport terminal, and he is also anxious about getting to the meeting on time, despite it being three hours away. He decides to take a taxi, driven by a lethargic looking Sikh man, to the meeting, as it is raining.

As the taxi is caught in traffic, a Peter Pan Bus rolls up in the lane next to the taxi and Wilson is transfixed by the sight of a beautiful woman reading a magazine sitting next to an odd looking man dressed in a black raincoat rummaging through a black briefcase. The man takes a black scarf out and sniffs it before proceeding to cut the woman's throat, placing the scarf around her neck to catch the blood, then sticking his finger in her mouth, while smiling at Wilson through the rainy window, as if knowing they share a terrible secret. Wilson debates about whether he should call the police, but eventually reasons that perhaps it was just a gag, like a flash mob, or that the other passengers on the bus had already attacked and subdued the man, allowing him the peace of mind to get out of the taxi and walk the rest of the way to his meeting in the rain.
