= The Bone Church =

Poem by Stephen King

- Short story by Stephen King
- Country: United States
- Language: English
- Genres: horror, fantasy, narrative poetry

Publication
- Published in: Playboy, The Bazaar of Bad Dreams
- Publication type: poem
- Publisher: Playboy, Charles Scribner's Sons
- Media type: Print
- Publication date: November, 2009

Chronology
A Death	Morality

"The Bone Church" is a narrative poem by Stephen King, first published in the November 2009 issue of Playboy, where it was illustrated by Phil Hale. It has since been collected and re-introduced in the November 3, 2015 anthology The Bazaar of Bad Dreams. In that introduction, King reveals that the poem is a revision of one he remembers writing in the late 1960s, which was performed by a friend at a University of Maine gathering.

== Summary ==
The poem's narrative is told in the first-person vernacular of a bar patron, who, in exchange for memories, demands drinks of his unidentified listener. He describes a doomed expedition through the jungles of an unnamed land, at the end of which only a few of the once-large party have survived. Awaiting the survivors is a dark, mystical experience.

== Style ==
The poem is related much like a regular narrative, as distinguished (by King himself in his prologue to it, for The Bazaar of Bad Dreams) from lyric poetry. It contains fewer than twenty stanzas and, although an occasional rhyme can be discerned, follows no standardised form, placing it in the category of free verse. The original late '60s version, since lost, was inspired, King says, by such Robert Browning narrative poems as "My Last Duchess". (Another Browning piece, "Childe Roland to the Dark Tower Came", famously inspired King's self-described magnum opus, his Dark Tower series.)

The poem's narrative style, of a man relating to a stranger the details of a macabre journey, has invited comparisons with Samuel Taylor Coleridge, the plot of whose poem "The Rime of the Ancient Mariner" follows a similar thread. The fearsome jungle setting and wildlife, on the other hand, has been compared to some of the poems and stories of Rudyard Kipling.

== See also ==
- Stephen King's short fiction bibliography
