= Mister Yummy =

2015 short story by Stephen King

- Short story by Stephen King
- Country: United States
- Language: English
- Genre: Horror short story

Publication
- Published in: The Bazaar of Bad Dreams
- Publisher: Scribner
- Media type: Print (hardcover)
- Publication date: 2015

"Mister Yummy" is a horror short story by Stephen King, first published in his 2015 story collection, The Bazaar of Bad Dreams.

== Plot ==
"Mister Yummy" details the last days in the life of Ollie Franklin, in particular his relationship with another elderly gentleman at the Lakeview Assisted Living Center named Dave Calhoun. Ollie, who is gay, recalls his experiences growing up as a gay man in America, losing friends to the AIDS epidemic in the 1980s, as well as his one-time encounter at a dance club in New York with a young good-looking fellow who he and his clique of friends called "Mister Yummy". Although he never saw him again in person, he has recently been seeing him again as a sort of avatar heralding his impending death, getting closer every time, and reasons that all people see different avatars when getting close to death's door. Dave at first doesn't believe him, considering him just senile and losing his hold on reality, until Ollie actually does die, only days after he first described seeing Mister Yummy.

At the end of the story, Dave, who is hetero, begins seeing his own avatar of death, a young, pretty, redheaded woman he saw after World War II getting out of her boyfriend's pickup truck that caused him to become sexually aroused.

== Film adaptation ==
In November 2025, Intrinsic Value Films began sales of a film adaptation for the story at the American Film Market. The screenplay is written by Troy Blake. In June 2026, Ben Young was hired to direct the film.
