= Afterlife (short story) =

Short story by Stephen King

- Short story by Stephen King
- Country: United States
- Language: English
- Genres: fantasy, psychological horror

Publication
- Published in: Tin House, The Bazaar of Bad Dreams
- Publication type: short story
- Publisher: Tin House, Charles Scribner's Sons
- Media type: Print
- Publication date: June, 2013

Chronology
| Morality | Ur |

"Afterlife" is a short story by Stephen King, first published in the June 2013 edition of Tin House, an American literary magazine and publisher. The story was later collected and re-introduced in the November 3, 2015 anthology The Bazaar of Bad Dreams, in which King revealed that the idea came from his own musings on mortality as he grew older. Though first published for mass consumption a year later, King read the story aloud for a charity event to raise money for scholarships at the University of Massachusetts Lowell on December 7, 2012. Footage of the reading was uploaded to YouTube.

"Afterlife" is the experience of a Goldman Sachs investment banker, William Andrews. He dies, surrounded by his wife and children, and then enters a bureaucratic vision of the afterlife. There, he meets a spiritual caseworker who offers him a difficult choice, seemingly with the knowledge that he has already made the choice many times before. As well as the 2008 financial crisis, in which Goldman Sachs was implicated, the story also refers to the Triangle Shirtwaist Factory fire, the deadliest industrial disaster in the history of New York City.

== Synopsis ==
William Andrews dies of colon cancer in a hospital bed surrounded by his family. He is ecstatic at the sensation of leaving his body and, therefore, leaving all of his pain behind. He sees a pinprick of white light which steadily expands.

He finds himself standing in a regular office corridor. On one wall are pinned several photographs of a company picnic. He discerns many faces from his past and, inexplicably, former president Ronald Reagan in the photos. He enters a door with "Isaac Harris" stenciled on it. Harris struggles with a tall pile of folders that have been delivered by a pneumatic tube. Harris introduces himself as a spiritual caseworker sentenced to a purgatory in which he must convey the choice facing each recently deceased person. This choice is between two doors, which Andrews sees to his left and right.

Harris explains that the left door will allow Andrews to live his life again and, apart from a vague and fleeting déjà vu, remember nothing of his previous life or his conversation with Harris. Harris says that Andrews has visited his office numerous times and always chosen the left door, despite being told that there is nothing he can do to change any of the bad things he did in his life, including incidents involving permanent injury to his brother, shoplifting, and the gang rape of a female college student. If Andrews chooses the right door, however, he will permanently cease to exist.

Andrews learns that Harris was co-owner of the Triangle Shirtwaist Factory, which produced women's garments. In 1911 Harris and his business partner, Max Blanck, were responsible for the deaths of 146 workers after they locked the doors to prevent theft and cigarette breaks. Harris does not know how long his purgatory will last and he still has not fully accepted responsibility for the deaths of his workers. Andrews argues that the corruption mostly went on far above his pay grade.

Determined to atone for the bad things he has done and to re-experience all of the good things, Andrews chooses the left door despite Harris' warnings. The story concludes as Andrews is born (again) in 1956. Andrews' mother marvels at the new life in her hands and the "limitless possibilities" that ironically do not await him.

== See also ==
- Stephen King's short fiction bibliography
