= Blockade Billy =

Novella by Stephen King

- First edition cover
- Author: Stephen King
- Language: English
- Genre: Suspense fiction
- Publisher: Cemetery Dance
- Publication date: April 20, 2010
- Publication place: United States
- Media type: Print (Hardcover)
- Pages: 112
- ISBN: 978-1-58767-228-6

Blockade Billy is a 2010 novella by Stephen King. It tells the story of William "Blockade Billy" Blakely, a fictional baseball catcher who briefly played for the New Jersey Titans during the 1957 season.

The novella took King two weeks to write. He had the following to say about the novella:

I love old-school baseball, and I also love the way people who've spent a lifetime in the game talk about the game. I tried to combine those things in a story of suspense. People have asked me for years when I was going to write a baseball story. Ask no more; this is it.

== Plot ==
The book is told through a framing device, where an old man in a retirement home, George "Granny" Grantham, is telling the story to Stephen King. Granny tells of the 1957 Major League Baseball season, when he was the third base coach for a now-defunct team, the New Jersey Titans.

When the team loses both of their catchers days before the start of the season, they are forced to seek a minor league player as a last-minute replacement. The replacement turns out to be a young man named William "Billy" Blakely. Although he seems to be feeble-minded and highly susceptible to suggestion, Billy turns out to be a phenomenal player. He becomes especially well-known for his incredible stopping power at home plate, earning him the nickname "Blockade Billy" amongst fans. Billy quickly becomes endeared to the team, especially to the usually self-centered star pitcher Danny Dusen, who adopts Billy as his good luck charm. Granny, however, becomes suspicious when an opposing player, who was badly injured during a tag out, accuses Billy of intentionally slicing his ankle. Although Billy claims innocence, and there is no evidence to support the accusation, Granny is convinced that he is lying. As the season goes on, Billy's popularity continues to grow.

One day, Granny finds the team's manager in a state of panic. Refusing to divulge what's wrong, he asks Granny to cover him as manager, only stating that the team deserves one last game together. During the following game, Hi Wenders, an umpire with an antagonistic relationship to the team, makes a bad call, resulting in Granny being thrown out of the game when he argues against it, leading to chants of "kill the ump" to come from the crowd. He returns to the locker room to find the manager with two police officers and a detective. They explain that Billy is an imposter; his real name is Eugene Katsanis, an orphan who worked on the Blakely farm in Iowa. The real "William Blakely" had seemingly been murdered by Eugene alongside his parents a month previously. Granny reflects on his own speculations of the situation, guessing that Eugene had been abused by the Blakelys and that the abuse grew worse as the real William, a failing minor league player, became consumed by jealousy over Eugene's superior skill. Eventually, Eugene was provoked into murdering the family. When the call came in requesting Billy as an emergency replacement for the Titans, Eugene assumed William's identity and reported to the team in his place.

Granny is asked to send Eugene to the police alone to be arrested. Despite Granny's attempt to create a convincing pretense for sending him to the locker room, Eugene senses that something is wrong and, rather than going straight there, tracks down Wenders. Following the crowd's demands to kill the umpire, he slashes Wenders' throat before being taken into police custody, where he dies by suicide, choking on a bar of soap. Granny goes on to describe the misfortunes the team suffered afterwards and reflects that despite their adoption of Billy as a good luck charm, he instead served as a black hole of luck, sucking it away from the rest of the team.

== Release ==
The book was published by Cemetery Dance on April 20, 2010 as a trade hardcover, timed to coincide with the opening of the 2010 MLB season. It has cover art by Glen Orbik and interior artwork by Alex McVey. First copies of the book included William Blakely's baseball card. Brian Freeman's Lonely Road Books released a deluxe signed edition of Blockade Billy in the summer of 2010. On May 25, 2010, Simon & Schuster released the novella as an audiobook, as well as a trade edition hardcover, featuring a bonus short story, "Morality" (originally published in the July 2009 issue of Esquire). A revised version of the story was later included in The Bazaar of Bad Dreams.

=== Editions ===
- Cemetery Dance Publications trade dustjacketed hardcover edition (April 20, 2010)
1. 1st edition, 1st printing limited to 10,000 copies and comes shrink wrapped with a William "Blockade Billy" Blakely baseball card. Optional slipcases from Cemetery Dance were available for a limited time at an additional fee
2. 2nd printing limited to 10,000 copies sent to libraries
- Scribner trade hardcover (May 25, 2010)
  - Contains the bonus, previously printed, short story "Morality." It is not scheduled to be illustrated or have a dust jacket (to be released as a paper on boards book)
- Simon & Schuster audiobook and e-book (May 25, 2010)
  - Also contains the bonus previously printed short story "Morality." Craig Wasson will be reading the audiobook version
- Lonely Road Books (Summer, 2010)
1. Signed Limited Edition - comes in a traycase and features new additional artwork from Alex McVey and Glen Orbik (the book will be signed by them too), a William "Blockade Billy" Blakely baseball card, and a signed Stephen King baseball card
2. Signed Lettered Edition - comes in a hand-made custom box with all of the Limited Edition bonuses plus an original piece of artwork and an art portfolio
- Scribner Included in The Bazaar of Bad Dreams collection (Fall of 2015)

== Reception ==
The Washington Post praised the novella, calling it "swift" and "colorful", saying that it works well because of the voice that King gives to the narrator, Granny Grantham, and "the lovingly detailed evocation of the game [baseball] as it was played in 1957".

Bookreporter.com says that the theme is not "especially new", but since it is a King product it is therefore worthy of consideration.
