= Bev Vincent =

Essayist author of fiction and a literary critic

- Website: www.bevvincent.com

Bev Vincent is an essayist author of fiction and a literary critic, he also is the author of The Road to the Dark Tower and The Stephen King Illustrated Companion.

== Selected bibliography ==
- The Road to the Dark Tower (2005, Cemetery Dance Publications) (illustrated by Glenn Chadbourne) ISBN 1-58767-104-2
- The Good, The Bad, & The Ugly: Eight Secondary Characters from the Dark Tower Series (2005, Cemetery Dance Publications) (illustrated by Glenn Chadbourne). Part of a free promotion.
- The Illustrated Stephen King Trivia Book (2005, Cemetery Dance Publications) - Co-edited by Brian Freeman and illustrated by Glenn Chadbourne ISBN 1-58767-116-6
- The Stephen King Illustrated Companion (2009, Fall River Press) ISBN 1-4351-1766-2
- The Dark Tower Companion (2013, New American Library) ISBN 0451237994
- Flight or Fright (2018, Cemetery Dance Publications / Hodder & Stoughton) : an anthology co-edited by Stephen King) ISBN 978-1-58767-679-6
- The short story Bloody Sunday found in The Book of Extraordinary New Sherlock Holmes Stories: The Best New Original Stories of the Genre ISBN 978-1-64250-432-3
- Blaze of Glory (2021, short story, Budgie Smuggler Games, Voices of Varuna: A Renegade Legion Anthology)
- Stephen King: A Complete Exploration of His Work, Life, and Influences (2022, Quarto) ISBN 978-0-7603-7681-2
