= Obits (short story) =

Short story by Stephen King

- Short story by Stephen King
- Country: United States
- Language: English
- Genre: Horror short story

Publication
- Published in: The Bazaar of Bad Dreams
- Publisher: Charles Scribner's Sons
- Media type: Print
- Publication date: 2015

"Obits" is a horror short story by American author Stephen King, which was first published in King's 2015 short-story collection, The Bazaar of Bad Dreams.

== Plot ==
Michael Anderson studied journalism at the University of Rhode Island. Following a string of odd jobs after graduation, he is offered a job at a webzine, Neon Circus, on the basis of a joke obituary he wrote for an actor who died of a drug overdose. The editor of Neon Circus, Jeroma Whitfield, gives him the obituaries column.

After Whitfield denies him a raise, Michael writes her obituary as a way to vent his frustration. A colleague later calls him at home to tell him that Whitfield is dead.

He tries to rationalize it as a coincidence, but when he writes another obituary for a living person, it becomes clear that he actually has a power. The power becomes like an addiction. With each use, Michael feels a stronger compulsion to use the power again. Eventually he finds that he can kill not just specific individuals, but simultaneously anyone who shares the same name.

He leaves Neon Circus, moves to Wyoming and takes a job painting houses. He stops using computers generally, but he keeps a tablet computer to read Neon Circus occasionally. He remembers one of his professors taught that the end of any story is the end "only for now".

== Reception ==
"Obits" won the 2016 Edgar Award for Best Short Story, and was nominated for the 2016 Hugo Award for Best Novelette.

== See also ==
- Stephen King short fiction bibliography
