= Act of Love (novel) =

Novel by Joe R. Lansdale

- Artwork by Mark A. Nelson
- Author: Joe R. Lansdale
- Cover artist: Mark A. Nelson
- Language: English
- Genre: Novel
- Publisher: Cemetery Dance Publications, Subterranean Press, Carroll and Graf
- Publication date: 1981
- Publication place: United States
- Media type: Print hardcover, limited edition
- Pages: 319
- ISBN: 1-881475-04-2
- Followed by: Texas Night Riders (1983)

Act of Love is a 1981 serial killer horror novel written by American author Joe R. Lansdale. This is Lansdale's first full-length novel.

== Plot summary ==
Set in Houston, Texas, around the area of the Fifth Ward, this novel tells the story of a vicious serial killer terrorizing the entire city and the police officers' desperation to stop him. Police lieutenant Marvin Hanson leads the investigation. The killer has chosen the poor seedy side of town as his hunting grounds. As the killings become more and more gruesome, the entire city becomes under siege.

== Editions ==
Originally published in 1981 by a small publishing house called Zebra Books, this novel has been re-issued as both a limited edition and as a trade hardcover. It was first re-issued by Cemetery Dance Publications (1992) and then by Subterranean Press (2012). It was also published as a paperback by Carroll and Graf in 1995.

Subterranean Press edition. Artwork by Timothy Truman.
