= Batman and Robin Have an Altercation =

2012 short story by Stephen King

- Short story by Stephen King
- Country: United States
- Language: English
- Genre: Short story

Publication
- Published in: Harper's Magazine
- Media type: Print
- Publication date: 2012

"Batman and Robin Have an Altercation" is a short story by the American author Stephen King. It was originally published in the September 2012 issue of Harper's Magazine, and later collected in King's short fiction collection The Bazaar of Bad Dreams in 2015.

The story won Ellie for Fiction in the 2013 National Magazine Awards.

In 2016, actor Stephen Lang read the short story for NPR's Too Hot for Radio podcast.

== Synopsis ==
Sanderson, a 61-year-old man, twice weekly visits his 83-year-old father, who is suffering from Alzheimer's disease. They dine at Applebee's for their weekly lunch, where for three years they have ordered the same food and had the same conversation. His father's memory is deteriorating; he mistakes Sanderson for Sanderson's late brother, who died 40 years ago in an accident. The only memory he holds is that they once dressed up as Batman and Robin for Halloween.

When driving his father home, Sanderson becomes distracted by an unpleasant (though unintentional) revelation by his father, and gets into a car accident when a pick-up truck swerves into his lane without signaling. The driver of the truck turns out to be an ex-convict with no license, who has no intention of swapping insurance information with Sanderson. When Sanderson insists, the man becomes enraged and starts beating Sanderson. Sanderson's father, in a rare moment of lucidity, intervenes and kills the driver with a steak knife he stole from the restaurant.
