= Richard Chizmar =

American screenwriter (born 1965)

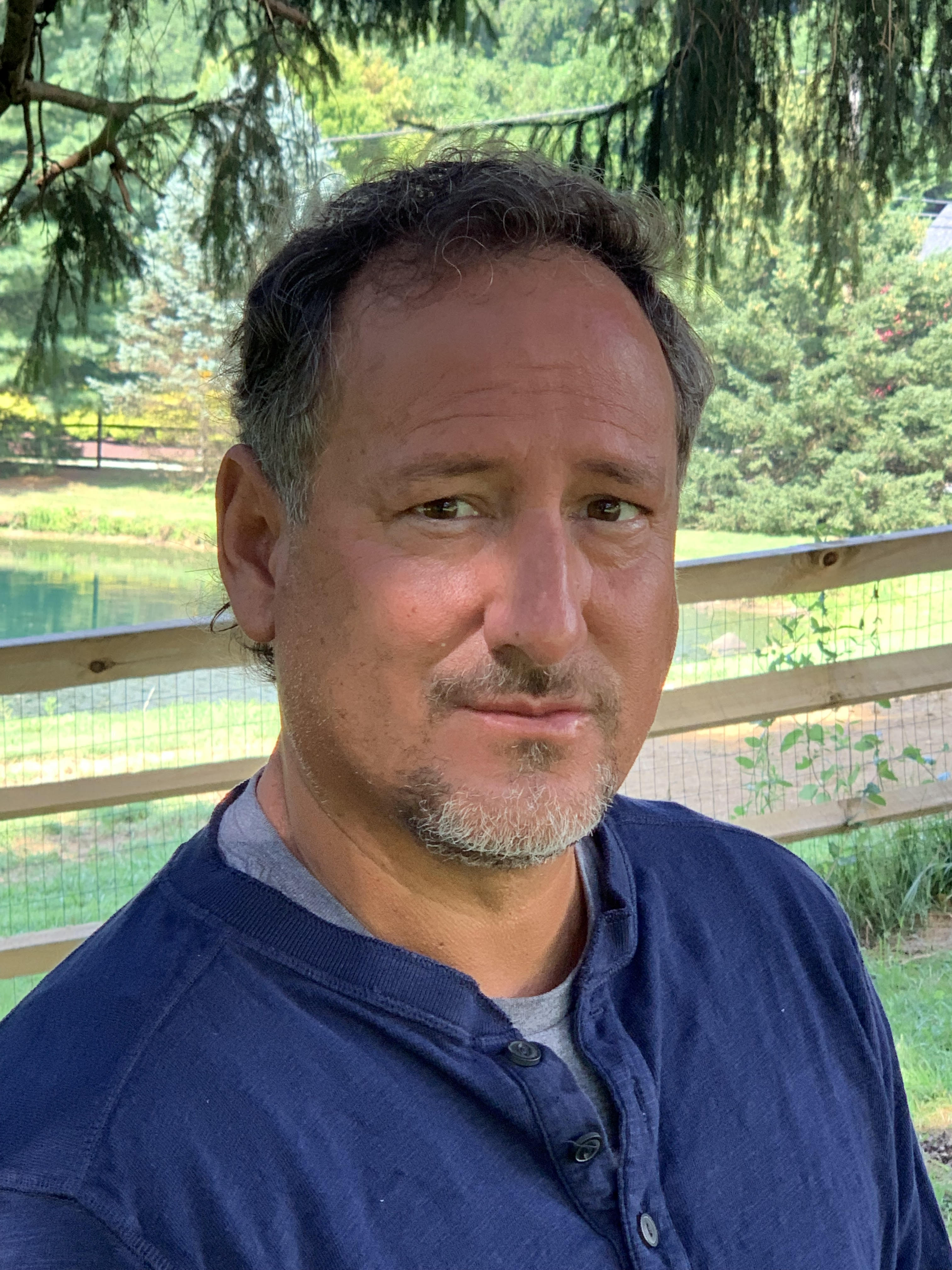
Richard Chizmar in 2021

Richard Thomas Chizmar (born 1965) is an American writer, the publisher and editor of Cemetery Dance magazine, and the owner of Cemetery Dance Publications. He also edits anthologies, produces films, writes screenplays, and teaches writing.

== Writing ==
Richard Chizmar is a New York Times, USA Today, Wall Street Journal, Washington Post, Amazon, and Publishers Weekly bestselling author.

He is the co-author (with Stephen King) of the novella, Gwendy's Button Box and the founder/publisher of Cemetery Dance magazine and the Cemetery Dance Publications book imprint. He has edited more than 35 anthologies and his short fiction has appeared in dozens of publications, including multiple editions of Ellery Queen’s Mystery Magazine and The Year’s 25 Finest Crime and Mystery Stories. He has won two World Fantasy awards, four International Horror Guild awards, and the HWA's Board of Trustee's award.

Chizmar (in collaboration with Johnathon Schaech) has also written screenplays and teleplays for United Artists, Sony Screen Gems, Lions Gate, Showtime, NBC, and many other companies. He has adapted the works of many bestselling authors including Stephen King, Peter Straub, and Bentley Little.

Chizmar is also the creator/writer of the online website, Stephen King Revisited. His fourth short story collection, The Long Way Home, was published in 2019. With Brian Freeman, Chizmar is co-editor of Dark Screams horror anthology series published by Random House imprint, Hydra.

His latest book, The Girl on the Porch, was released in hardcover by Subterranean Press, and Widow’s Point, a novella about a haunted lighthouse written with his son, Billy Chizmar, was recently adapted into a feature film.

Chizmar's work has been translated into more than fifteen languages throughout the world, and he has appeared at numerous conferences as a writing instructor, guest speaker, panelist, and guest of honor.

== Publishing ==
Chizmar is the founder of Cemetery Dance, a literary publisher that runs a magazine by the same name and a book imprint, Cemetery Dance Publications. He founded Cemetery Dance magazine in 1988 while attending the University of Maryland's College of Journalism. It features dark fantasy, horror fiction, and articles related to those subjects. Metro Silicon Valley called it "America's longest-running independent horror-themed magazine".

The book imprint, Cemetery Dance Publications was first launched in 1992 and has produced more than 300 different autographed limited edition, lettered edition hardcover novels, novellas, and anthologies. It also publishes chapbooks, trade hardcovers, and a few paperbacks.

== Screenplays and Chesapeake films ==
Richard Chizmar co-founded Chesapeake Films with Johnathon Schaech, with whom he also co-writes screenplays. Their produced screenplays include 2006's Road House 2 (based on the story by Miles Chapman) and Showtime's Masters of Horror presentation of The Washingtonians (based on Bentley Little's story) from 2007. They also wrote the screenplay for an unproduced adaptation of From a Buick 8 based on Stephen King's novel.

== Selected awards ==
Work	Year & Award	Category	Result	Ref.
Cemetery Dance	1990 World Fantasy Special Award—Non-professional		Nominated	
Cemetery Dance	1991 World Fantasy Special Award—Non-professional		Won	
Cemetery Dance	1993 World Fantasy Special Award—Non-professional		Nominated	
Cemetery Dance	1994 World Fantasy Special Award—Non-professional		Nominated	
Cemetery Dance	1995 World Fantasy Special Award—Non-professional		Nominated	
Cemetery Dance	1996 British Fantasy Award	Small Press	Nominated	
Cemetery Dance	1997 British Fantasy Award	Small Press	Nominated	
Cemetery Dance	1998 World Fantasy Special Award—Non-professional		Nominated	
Cemetery Dance	1999 World Fantasy Special Award—Non-professional		Won	
Cemetery Dance	2007 Black Quill Award	Dark Genre Short Fiction Magazine (Editors' Choice)	Won	
Cemetery Dance	2008 Black Quill Award	Dark Genre Short Fiction Magazine (Readers' Choice)	Won	
Midnight Promises	1997 World Fantasy Award	Collection	Nominated	
Best of Cemetery Dance	1998 Bram Stoker Award	Anthology	Nominated	
Best of Cemetery Dance	1998 International Horror Guild Award	Anthology	Nominated	
Subterranean Gallery (with William Schafer)	1999 International Horror Guild Award	Anthology	Won	
October Dreams: A Celebration of Halloween (with Robert Morrish)	2000 International Horror Guild Award	Anthology	Won	
October Dreams: A Celebration of Halloween (with Robert Morrish)	2001 Locus Award	Anthology	Nominated	
Night Visions 10	2001 International Horror Guild Award	Anthology	Won	
Night Visions 10	2002 Locus Award	Anthology	Nominated	
Trick or Treat: A Collection of Halloween Novellas	2001 Bram Stoker Award	Anthology	Nominated	
Shivers	2002 Bram Stoker Award	Anthology	Nominated	
Shivers III	2004 Bram Stoker Award	Anthology	Nominated	
Shivers V	2009 Black Quill Awards	Dark Genre Anthology	Nominated	
A Long December	2016 Bram Stoker Award	Fiction Collection	Nominated	
Chasing the Boogeyman	2021 Goodreads Choice Awards	Horror	Nominated	
Gwendy's Final Task (with Stephen King)	2022 Goodreads Choice Awards	Horror	Nominated	
Gwendy's Final Task (with Stephen King)	2023 Locus Award	Anthology	Nominated	
Becoming the Boogeyman	2023 Goodreads Choice Awards	Horror	Nominated	

== Books ==
=== Gwendy trilogy ===
1. Gwendy's Button Box (with Stephen King) (2017)
2. Gwendy's Magic Feather (2019)
3. Gwendy's Final Task (with Stephen King) (2020)

=== Boogeyman series ===
1. Chasing the Boogeyman (2021)
2. Becoming the Boogeyman (2023)
3. Killing the Boogeyman (2026)

=== Standalone novels ===
- Darkness Whispers (with Brian James Freeman) (2017)
- The Girl on the Porch (2019)
- Memorials (2024)
- Widow's Point: The Complete Haunting (with WH Chizmar) (2025)

=== Short stories and novellas ===
- Dirty Coppers (with Ed Gorman) (1997)
- Devil's Night: A Halloween Short Story (2012)
- Brothers (2015)
- Widow's Point (2018)
- The Washingtonians (with Bentley Little and Johnathon Schaech (2018)
- The Man Behind the Mask (2024)

== See also ==
- List of horror fiction authors
