= Bad Little Kid =

- Short story by Stephen King
- Country: United States
- Language: English
- Genre: Horror

Publication
- Publication type: E-book
- Publisher: Albin Michel
- Publication date: March 14, 2014

"Bad Little Kid" is a short horror story by Stephen King, which was originally published in German and French in an electronic version. The first paper print in English was in King's 2015 short story collection, The Bazaar of Bad Dreams.

== Plot ==
Attorney Leonard Bradley visits his client, George Hallas, in prison. Hallas has been sentenced to death by lethal injection for the murder of a young boy. He will be executed in less than a week, despite Bradley's attempts to prevent it. Hallas has never explained why he committed this brutal act.

Now he feels like talking about what he calls "the bad little kid": a six or seven-year-old boy with orange hair, green eyes, and a beanie, who made Hallas' life a living hell for years.

Hallas' mother died during childbirth, so he was raised by his father and the housekeeper, Mama Nonie. His first encounter with the "Bad Little Kid" was in 1977. Hallas was good friends with a slightly older and mentally challenged girl named Marlee. One day, the orange-haired boy appeared and terrorized Marlee, causing her to be struck by a motor vehicle.

Years later, when Hallas was having a relationship with a woman named Vicky, the kid appeared again, still the same age as he was back in 1977. His bullying drove Vicky to suicide.

Three years after Hallas married Carla Winston, the kid caused a gas explosion in a mine that killed Hallas' father. He made a series of harassing phone calls to Mama Nonie, who cancelled her phone service; she was unable to call for help when she suffered a heart attack. After many attempts to get pregnant, Carla and Hallas were expecting their first child. Unfortunately, the Bad Little Kid caused an accident and Carla miscarried.

Hallas decided to set a trap for the Bad Little Kid. He became an active volunteer for the local church helping troubled boys. The kid showed up again after Hallas successfully helped one boy get desperately needed eye surgery. Hallas was prepared for him and killed the kid in front of dozens of witnesses. Hallas finishes his story with a warning to Bradley that the kid might come back, considering what kind of monster he was.

After Hallas' execution, Bradley finds a beanie with a bent propeller on the passenger seat of his car with two notes attached: one saying "See you soon".
