= Mile 81 =

Novella by Stephen King

- Cover of the original e-book release
- Author: Stephen King
- Language: English
- Genre: Horror, science fiction
- Publisher: Simon & Schuster Digital
- Publication date: September 1, 2011
- Publication place: United States
- Media type: E-book
- Pages: 80

Mile 81 is a novella by Stephen King, originally published as an e-book on September 1, 2011. The publication also includes an excerpt from King's novel 11/22/63, published two months later. It has also been collected in the 2015 short story collection The Bazaar of Bad Dreams.

== Summary ==
At Mile 81 on the Maine Turnpike is a boarded-up rest stop, a place where teens drink and get into trouble. Pete Simmons sneaks away from his older brother and arrives there, where he finds a bottle of vodka and magazines. He drinks enough to pass out.

A mud-covered station wagon (when there had not been any rain in New England for over a week) veers into the Mile 81 rest area, ignoring the sign that says "closed, no services". The driver's door opens but nobody gets out.

It is eventually revealed that the "station wagon" is not a station wagon at all, but a sentient, extraterrestrial entity that only assumed the form of an earthly vehicle in order to lure in unsuspecting victims.

== Reception ==
The story received a starred review from Library Journal with Mike Rogers calling it a no-brainer to purchase. Publishers Weekly called the story unnerving.

== Adaptation ==
In February 2019, it was announced that a film adaptation is in development, with Alastair Lagrand set to direct.

== See also ==
- Stephen King short fiction bibliography
