= Thomas F. Monteleone =

American novelist

- Born: Thomas Francis Monteleone; April 14, 1946 (age 80); Baltimore, Maryland, U.S.
- Education: University of Maryland, College Park

Thomas Francis Monteleone (born April 14, 1946) is an American science fiction author and horror fiction author.

== Early life ==
Born at in Baltimore, Maryland, Monteleone was raised in Sudbrook Park, in the same state. Monteleone attended a Jesuit high school, Loyola Blakefield, one year ahead of Tom Clancy. Monteleone studied at the University of Maryland, College Park, where he received degrees in English and Psychology. From 1969 to 1978 Monteleone worked as a psychotherapist in the Clifton T. Perkins Hospital Center in Jessup, Maryland, while studying English at the graduate level.

== Career ==
Monteleone has been a professional writer since 1972. Monteleone's first story appeared in Amazing Stories magazine in 1972. His first novel, Seeds of Change was the lead-off title in the critically unsuccessful Laser Books line of science fiction titles. He became a popular writer of supernatural thrillers. He has published more than 100 short stories in numerous magazines and anthologies. His best-selling novel, Blood of the Lamb was named a New York Times Notable Book of the Year.

His column of opinion and entertainment, "The Mothers And Fathers Italian Association", currently appears in Cemetery Dance magazine. He is the editor of nine anthologies, including the highly acclaimed, Stoker Award-winning Borderlands series edited with his wife, Elizabeth. His stories have been nominated for many awards, and have appeared in many best-of-the-year compilations.

Monteleone's five collections of selected short fiction are Dark Stars and Other Illuminations (1981), Rough Beasts and Other Mutations (2003),The Little Brown Book of Bizarre Stories (2004), Fearful Symmetries (2004), and Dark Arts (2014). His novels, The Resurrectionist and Night of Broken Souls, global thrillers from Warner Books, received rave reviews and have been optioned for films. The Reckoning (2000), a sequel to The Blood of the Lamb, and The Eyes of the Virgin (2002) have been published by Forge. His omnibus volume of essays about the book and film industries entitled The Mothers And Fathers Italian Association was published by Borderlands Press and won the Bram Stoker Award for Non-Fiction. He is also the author of the bestseller The Complete Idiot’s Guide to Writing a Novel (2004). His books and stories have been translated into fourteen foreign languages.

Monteleone has also written for the stage and television, having scripts produced for American Playhouse (which won him the Bronze Award at the International TV and Film Festival of New York and the Gabriel Award), George A. Romero’s Tales from the Darkside, and the Fox TV series Night Visions. He has written many feature-length screenplays, none of which have been produced.

== Awards ==
Among his awards, Monteleone is a five-time winner of the Bram Stoker Award in various categories as well as the Bram Stoker Lifetime Achievement award.

Year	Award	Category	Work	Result	Ref.
1974	Astounding Award for Best New Writer		Wendigo's Child	Nominated	
1977	Nebula Award	Short Story	Breath's a Ware That Will Not Keep	Nominated	
1978	Nebula Award	Short Story	Camera Obscura	Nominated	
1978	Locus Award	Short Fiction	Camera Obscura	Nominated	
1980	Locus Award	Novella	The Dancer in the Darkness	Nominated	
1981	Analog Award	Serial Novel/Novella	Dragonstar (with David Bischoff	3rd Place	
1991	Locus Award	Anthology	Borderlands	Nominated	
1991	World Fantasy Award	Anthology	Borderlands	Nominated	
1991	British Fantasy Award	Anthology/Collection	Borderlands	Nominated	
1992	Bram Stoker Award	Novel	Blood of the Lamb	Won	
1992	British Fantasy Award	Anthology/Collection	Borderlands 2	Nominated	
1995	Bram Stoker Award	Long Fiction	Looking for Mr. Flip	Nominated	
2003	International Horror Guild Award	Anthology	Borderlands 5	Nominated	
2003	Bram Stoker Award	Non-Fiction	The Mothers and Fathers Italian Association	Won	
2003	Bram Stoker Award	Anthology	Borderlands 5	Won	
2004	Bram Stoker Award	Fiction Collection	Fearful Symmetries	Won	
2004	Bram Stoker Award	Non-Fiction	The Complete Idiot's Guide to Writing a Novel	Nominated	
2016	Bram Stoker Award	Anthology	Borderlands 6	Won	
2017	Bram Stoker Award	Lifetime Achievement		Won	

In 2017, The Horror Writers Association honored him with their Lifetime Achievement Award. His membership and Lifetime Achievement Award benefits were revoked on January 31, 2023, by The Horror Writers Association for his not following the organization's anti-harassment policies. Per HWA rules, 80% of the officers voted for his expulsion from the organization.

== Politics ==
In a 1992 interview, Monteleone stated he was "registered as Independent". More recently, Monteleone has described himself as a libertarian. Discussing the issue of drug prohibition, Monteleone has stated that "Now just because I'm not into the drug scene doesn't mean I'm any less of a good Libertarian. I think all drugs should be legalized". Monteleone argues that the war on drugs cannot be won, that criminalization creates a "phantom economy" dominated by violent criminals, and that drug prohibition is a violation of individual liberty. Monteleone is an admirer of Ayn Rand, and has described her book Atlas Shrugged as a "personal barometer". Monteleone has also criticized the Clinton administration for bringing an antitrust suit against the Microsoft corporation.

== Personal life ==
Monteleone's wife, Elizabeth, co-manages Borderlands Press with Monteleone. Monteleone has a son and a daughter.

In 1967, while a student at the University of Maryland, Monteleone was involved in a UFO hoax, claiming that aliens had taken him to the planet "Lanulos". This story seemed to confirm the experiences of alleged contactee Woodrow Derenberger and was investigated by journalist John Keel. Keel discusses the incident in several books (see chapter 14 of The Mothman Prophecies) and seems to have taken it seriously at the time, though Monteleone later confirmed it was a prank. He came to regret the publicity and harassment that the hoax generated.

== Works ==
=== Novels ===
Dragonstar series (with David Bischoff):

1. Day of the Dragonstar, Berkley, 1983, ISBN 0-425-05932-4
2. Night of the Dragonstar, Berkley, 1985, ISBN 0-425-07963-5
3. Dragonstar Destiny, Ace Books, 1989, ISBN 0-441-16676-8

Standalone:

- Seeds of Change, Laser Books, 1975, ISBN 0-88950-900-X
- The Time Connection, Popular Library, 1976, ISBN 0-445-00417-7
- The Time-Swept City, Popular Library, 1977, ISBN 0-445-04081-5
- The Secret Sea, Popular Library, 1979, ISBN 0-445-04404-7
- Guardian, Doubleday, 1980, ISBN 0-385-13694-3
  - Paperback reprint: Fawcett Popular Library, 1981, ISBN 0-445-04682-1
- Night Things (1980)
- Ozymandias (1981)
- Night Train (1984)
- Lyrica: A Novel of Horror and Desire (1986)
- Fantasma (1987)
- The Magnificent Gallery (1987)
- The Crooked House (1987) (with John DeChancie)
- The Blood of the Lamb (1992)
- The Resurrectionist (1995)
- Night of Broken Souls (1997)
- The Reckoning (1999)
- Eyes of the Virgin (2002)
- Serpentine (2007)
- Submerged (2015)

=== Fiction collections ===
- Dark Stars and Other Illuminations (1981)
- Rough Beasts and Other Mutations (2003)
- Fearful Symmetries (Cemetery Dance Publications, 2004) ISBN 1-58767-053-4
- A Little Brown Book of Bizarre Stories (2009)
- Dark Arts (2014)

=== Uncollected Short Fiction ===
- Agony in the Garden (1973)
- Chicago (1973)
- Wendigo's Child (1973)
- The Thing from Ennis Rock (1974)
- Breath's a Ware That Will Not Keep (1975)
- Good and Faithful Servant (1976)
- Far from Eve and Morning (1977)
- The Imperfect Lover (1978)
- When Dark Descends (1979)
- The Last Word: The Gullibility Factor (1979)
- Love is the Prey (1993)
- The Stuff of Life to Knit You (1995) (with Robert Wayne McCoy)
- The House of Dust (2003) (with Elizabeth E. Monteleone)
- Sideshow (2004)
- Horn of Plenty (2004)
- A Fine and Private Place (2005)
- How Sweet it Was (2006)
- They Call Me Eddie (2006)
- End of Story (2007)
- Images in Anthracite (2007)
- The Diary of Louise Carey (2009)
- The Exchange (2012)
- When I Was (2013)
- Thantophobia (2015)
- The Other Model (2019)
- Timewalker (2022)

=== Non-fiction ===
- The Mothers and Fathers Italian Association (2003)
- The Complete Idiot's Guide to Writing a Novel (2004)
- The Complete Idiot's Guide to Writing a Novel, 2nd Edition (2010)

=== Books Edited ===
- The Arts and Beyond: Visions of Man's Aesthetic Future (1977)
- Random Access Messages of the Computer Age (1984)
- Microworlds (1985)
- Borderlands series:
  - Borderlands (1988)
  - Borderlands 2 (1991)
  - Borderlands 3 (1993)
  - Borderlands 4 (1994) (with Elizabeth Monteleone)
  - Borderlands 5 (2004) (with Elizabeth Monteleone)
  - Borderlands 6 (2016) (with Olivia Monteleone)
