= Cemetery Dance Publications =

American specialty press publisher of horror and dark suspense

- Founded: 1988
- Founder: Richard Chizmar
- Country of origin: United States
- Headquarters location: Forest Hill, Maryland
- Publication types: Books, magazines
- Fiction genres: Horror
- Official website: cemeterydance.com

Cemetery Dance is an American company known for their specialty press publisher of horror and dark suspense and their horror magazine of the same name. Cemetery Dance was founded by Richard Chizmar, a horror author, while he was in college. Cemetery Dance Publications was formed in 1992 after Chizmar and the company's success with Cemetery Dance magazine, another branch which was founded in 1988. They later expanded to encompass a magazine and website featuring news, interviews, and reviews related to horror literature.

Cemetery Dance Publications is known for their high quality hardcover releases. These are usually available as collectible autographed limited editions and lettered editions.

== History ==
Cemetery Dance was first founded as a literary magazine by Richard Chizmar in 1988, during his final year of college at the University of Maryland's College of Journalism. Chizmar named the magazine after one of his short stories and wanted it to feature dark fiction akin to what he saw on The Twilight Zone and Night Gallery. The first issue was published in December 1988; prior to its release the company publicized Cemetery Dance heavily in genre magazines and "practically anywhere else we could afford an ad". Chizmar originally intended for the magazine to release no more than twice a year, however in 1990 the decision was made to publish four issues a year. The company initially solicited authors through writers' organizations and publishers contacts; over time the magazine began to receive submissions from authors and literary agents. In their 14th issue the magazine would publish Stephen King's short story "Chattery Teeth", marking the start of the company's work with King.

In 1992 the book publishing wing of Cemetery Dance was launched; Chizmar has stated that both branches of the company were launched for roughly the same reason: that he "saw an opportunity to put some of my favorite authors in hardcover and the temptation was too much to resist." For the first few years of the book imprint's existence the company published about two to three hardcovers a year, which increased as the company's sales and experience grew. The first book published by Cemetery Dance was Prisoners & Other Stories by Ed Gorman and featured an afterword by Dean Koontz. In 2007 the company moved to their Forest Hill, Maryland location.

== Awards ==
- Richard Chizmar won the 1999 World Fantasy Award for Cemetery Dance Publications (the magazine won in 1990 and 1992). It was also nominated for the same award in 1993 and again in 1998.
- Dark Harvest by Norman Partridge won the 2006 Bram Stoker Award for Best Long Fiction, has been nominated for the 2007 World Fantasy Award, and it was named one of the 2006 "Best Books of the Year" by Publishers Weekly.
- Basic Black: Tales of Appropriate Fear by Terry Dowling was an Honourable Mention for the 2006 Australian Shadows Award (hosted by the Australian Horror Writers Association).

=== Bram Stoker Award nominations and wins ===
- 2006 Bram Stoker Award Winners:

Long Fiction: Dark Harvest by Norman Partridge
Short Fiction: "Tested" by Lisa Morton, in CD #55
Fiction Collection: Destinations Unknown by Gary A. Braunbeck
Anthology: Mondo Zombie edited by John Skipp

- 2004 Bram Stoker Award Nominees:

First Novel: Black Fire by James Kidman
Short Fiction: "A Madness of Starlings" by Douglas Clegg in CD #50
Fiction Collection: The Machinery of Night by Douglas Clegg
Anthology: Shivers III edited by Richard Chizmar
Non-Fiction: The Road to the Dark Tower by Bev Vincent

- 2004 Bram Stoker Award Winner:

Fiction Collection: Fearful Symmetries by Thomas F. Monteleone

- 2003 Bram Stoker Award Nominees:

Long Fiction: The Necromancer by Douglas Clegg
Long Fiction: Roll Them Bones by David Niall Wilson

- 2002 Bram Stoker Award Nominees:

Novel: From a Buick 8 by Stephen King
Fiction Collection: Knuckles and Tales by Nancy A. Collins
Anthology: Shivers edited by Richard Chizmar

- 2001 Bram Stoker Award Nominees:

Anthology: Trick or Treat: A Collection of Halloween Novellas edited by Richard Chizmar

- 2001 Bram Stoker Award Winner:

Alternative Forms: Dark Dreamers: Facing the Masters of Fear by Beth Gwinn & Stanley Wiater

- 2000 Bram Stoker Award Nominees:

Anthology: Bad News edited by Richard Laymon
Short Fiction: Jack Ketchum's "Gone" (published in the anthology October Dreams)

- 2000 Bram Stoker Award Winner:

Novel: The Traveling Vampire Show by Richard Laymon

- 1999 Bram Stoker Award Nominees:

Long Fiction: Right to Life by Jack Ketchum

- 1999 Bram Stoker Award Winner:

Anthology: 999: New Stories of Horror and Suspense edited by Al Sarrantonio

- 1998 Bram Stoker Award Nominees:

Anthology: Robert Bloch's Psychos edited by Robert Bloch and Martin H. Greenberg
Anthology: Best of Cemetery Dance edited by Richard Chizmar

- 1997 Bram Stoker Award Nominees:

Fiction Collection: Things Left Behind by Gary A. Braunbeck

- 1994 Bram Stoker Award Winners:

Short Fiction: "The Box" by Jack Ketchum in CD #20
Fiction Collection: Writer of the Purple Rage by Joe R. Lansdale

== Selected list of books published by Cemetery Dance Publications ==
- It: The 25th Anniversary Edition (signed limited edition) by Stephen King (December 2011)
- Gwendy's Button Box by Stephen King and Richard Chizmar (novella first published by Cemetery Dance Publications) (May 2017)
- Full Dark, No Stars (signed limited edition) by Stephen King (December 2010)
- Blockade Billy by Stephen King (an original novella first printed by Cemetery Dance Publications) (April 2010) ISBN 978-1-58767-228-6
- The Secretary of Dreams: Volume 1 (and Volume 2) by Stephen King and illustrated by Glenn Chadbourne (2006) ISBN 1-58767-140-9 (Volume II's ISBN 978-1-58767-185-2)
- From a Buick 8 (signed limited edition) by Stephen King (2002) ISBN 1-58767-061-5
- The Dark Man: An Illustrated Poem by Stephen King and illustrated by Glenn Chadbourne (2013) ISBN 978-1-58767-421-1
- Robert Bloch's Psychos, edited by Robert Bloch & Martin H. Greenberg (1997) ISBN 1-881475-26-3
- October Dreams: A Celebration of Halloween, edited by Richard Chizmar with Robert Morrish (2000) ISBN 1-58767-019-4
- Blue November Storms, by Brian Freeman (2005) ISBN 1-58767-110-7
- Strange Highways, by Dean Koontz (1995) ISBN 1-881475-15-8
- Fear Nothing, by Dean Koontz (1997) ISBN 1-881475-27-1
- Seize the Night, by Dean Koontz (1998) ISBN 1-881475-44-1
- False Memory, by Dean Koontz (1999) ISBN 1-881475-85-9
- Mucho Mojo signed limited edition by Joe R. Lansdale (1994) ISBN 0-89296-490-1
- Act of love signed limited edition by Joe R. Lansdale (1981) ISBN 1-881475-04-2
- Writer of the Purple Rage short story collection by Joe R. Lansdale (1994) ISBN 0-7867-0389-X
- Nothing Lasting E-book by Glen Krisch

== Selected list of published authors ==
- Clive Barker
- Charles Beaumont
- William Peter Blatty
- Max Booth III
- Ray Bradbury
- Kealan Patrick Burke
- Poppy Z. Brite
- Lincoln Child
- Richard Chizmar
- Simon Clark
- Douglas Clegg
- Justin Cronin
- Frank Darabont
- Dennis Etchison
- Preston Fassel
- Gillian Flynn
- Brian Freeman
- Mick Garris
- Ray Garton
- Christopher Golden
- J. F. Gonzalez
- Ed Gorman
- Rick Hautala
- Joe Hill (writer)
- Brian Hodge
- Brian Keene
- Ronald Kelly
- Jack Ketchum
- Stephen King
- Dean Koontz
- Michael Koryta
- Joe R. Lansdale
- Richard Laymon
- Tim Lebbon
- Edward Lee
- Bentley Little
- John R. Little
- Graham Masterton
- Richard Matheson
- Brett McBean
- Robert McCammon
- Thomas F. Monteleone
- William F. Nolan
- James A. Moore
- Norman Partridge
- John Pelan
- Douglas Preston
- Bill Pronzini
- Anne Rice
- Al Sarrantonio
- Michael Slade
- Peter Straub
- Thomas Tessier
- Bill Walker
- F. Paul Wilson
- T. M. Wright
