= List of awards and nominations received by Stephen King =

Stephen King awards and nominations
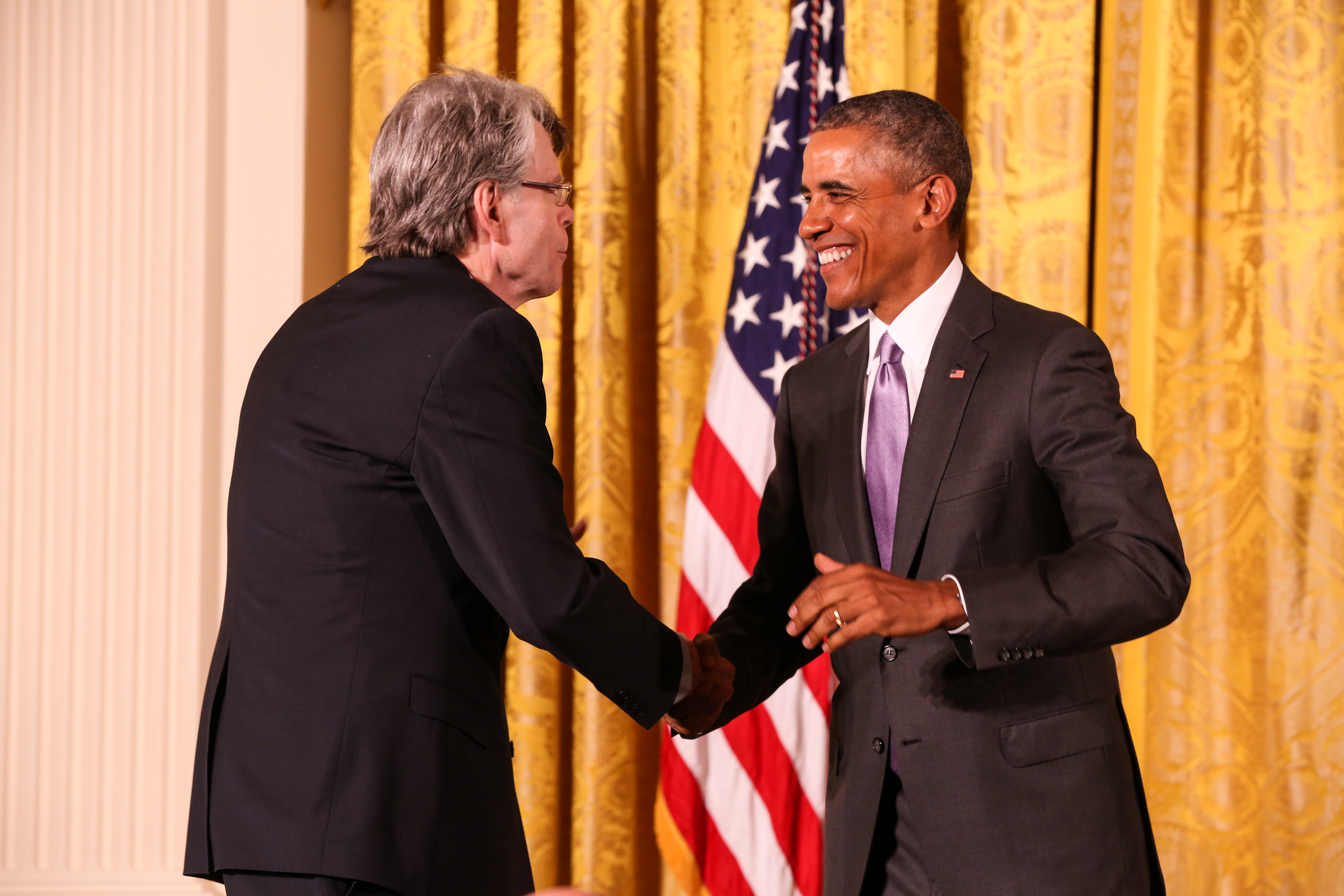
- President Barack Obama awards King the National Medal of Arts in 2015
Awards and nominations
Award	Wins	Nominations
American Library Association	5	4
Anthony Award	0	1
Audie Award	6	14
Balrog Award	1	10
BBC	3	0
Black Quill Award	1	4
Bram Stoker Award	13	33
British Fantasy Award	7	13
Canadian Booksellers Award	1	0
Colorado Blue Spruce Young Adult Book Award	2	3
Deutscher Phantastik Preis	4	6
Dragon Award	1	1
Edgar Award	3	2
Eisner Award	1	0
Entertainment Weekly	1	0
Fall for the Book Festival	1	0
Fangoria	1	0
Fantafestival	1	0
Fantasporto	0	1
Gandalf Award	0	2
Golden Raspberry Award	0	1
Goodreads Choice Award	11	9
Hugo Award	1	2
International Association of Crime Writers	1	0
International Horror Guild Award	3	11
International Thriller Writers Award	1	2
Italia Award	1	1
Japan Booksellers’ Award	1	0
Locus Award	5	56
Los Angeles Public Library	1	0
Los Angeles Times Book Review	1	0
Modern Library 100 Best Novels	2	0
Mystery Writers of America	1	0
Mystery Writers of Japan	1	0
National Book Foundation	1	0
National Endowment of the Arts	1	0
National Magazine Award	2	1
Nebula Award	0	1
New York Public Library	2	0
New York Times Book Review	1	0
O. Henry Award	1	0
Online Film & Television Association	1	0
Primetime Emmy Award	0	2
Prix Ozone Award	1	0
Quill Award	1	2
Shirley Jackson Award	2	2
Spokane Public Library	1	0
Takarajimasha	6	0
University of Maine	1	0
University of Southern California	1	2
US Magazine	1	0
World Fantasy Award	4	16
World Horror Convention	1	0

Totals (Note: Certain award groups do not simply award one winner. They acknowledge several different recipients, have runners-up, and have third place. Since this is a specific recognition and is different from losing an award, runner-up mentions are considered wins in this award tally. For simplification and to avoid errors, each award in this list has been presumed to have had a prior nomination.)
- Wins: 110
- Nominations: 295

Stephen King is an American author of contemporary horror, supernatural fiction, suspense, science fiction, crime fiction, and fantasy. His books have sold more than 350 million copies, many of which have been adapted into feature films, miniseries, television shows, and comic books. King has published 61 novels, including seven under the pen name Richard Bachman, and five non-fiction books. He has written approximately 200 short stories, most of which have been compiled in book collections.

King has received multiple awards and nominations for his work, including multiple Bram Stoker Awards, World Fantasy Awards, and British Fantasy Society Awards, as well as the National Medal of Arts, Medal for Distinguished Contribution to American Letters, and the O. Henry Award. He has also received awards for his contribution to literature for his entire oeuvre, such as the World Fantasy Award for Life Achievement (2004), the Canadian Booksellers Association Lifetime Achievement Award (2007), and the Grand Master Award from the Mystery Writers of America (2007).

== Awards and nominations ==
=== Career and lifetime achievement awards ===
Year	Award	Category	Result	Ref.
1980	Balrog Award	Professional Achievement	Nominated	
1981	University of Maine	Alumni Career Award	Won	
1981	World Fantasy Award	Convention Award	Won	
1981	Balrog Award	Professional Achievement	Nominated	
1981	British Fantasy Award	Special Award	Won	
1982	Balrog Award	Professional Achievement	Nominated	
1986	Spokane Public Library	Golden Pen Award	Won	
1992	World Horror Convention	Grand Master Award	Won	
1994	Fangoria	Fangoria Hall of Fame	Inducted	
2002	Bram Stoker Award	Lifetime Achievement Award	Won	
2003	International Horror Guild Award	Living Legend Award	Won	
2003	National Book Foundation	Medal for Distinguished Contribution to American Letters	Won	
2004	World Fantasy Award	Life Achievement	Won	
2007	Canadian Booksellers Association	Lifetime Achievement Award	Won	
2007	Edgar Award	Grand Master Award	Won	
2010	Los Angeles Public Library	Literary Award	Won	
2011	Fall for the Book Festival	Mason Award	Won	
2014	National Endowment of the Arts	National Medal of Arts	Awarded	
2020	Audie Award	Lifetime Achievement	Won	

=== Works ===
Award	Year	Category	Recipient(s)	Result	Ref.
American Library Association	1978	Best Books for Young Adults	'Salem's Lot	Won	
American Library Association	1978	Best Books for Young Adults	Night Shift	Nominated	
American Library Association	1979	Best Books for Young Adults	The Long Walk	Won	
American Library Association	1981	Best Books for Young Adults	Firestarter	Won	
American Library Association	2000	Best Books for Young Adults	The Girl Who Loved Tom Gordon	Nominated	
American Library Association	2000	100 Best Books for Teens - 1966–2000	The Long Walk	Selected	
American Library Association	2009	Alex Award	Just After Sunset	Won	
American Library Association	2010	Alex Award	Under the Dome	Nominated	
American Library Association	2014	Alex Award	Joyland	Nominated	
Anthony Award	2014	Best Paperback Original	Joyland	Nominated	
Audie Award	1997	Best Unabridged Fiction Audiobook	The Green Mile (narrated by Frank Muller)	Won	
Audie Award	1999	Best Audiobook Package Design	Bag of Bones	Nominated	
Audie Award	2001	Best Unabridged Non-Fiction Audiobook	On Writing: A Memoir of the Craft	Nominated	
Audie Award	2002	Best Unabridged Fiction Audiobook	The Talisman (co-written with Peter Straub; narrated by Frank Muller)	Won	
Audie Award	2006	Best Solo Narration — Male	The Shining (narrated by Campbell Scott)	Nominated	
Audie Award	2009	Best Fiction Audiobook	Duma Key (narrated by John Slattery)	Won	
Audie Award	2010	Best Short Stories / Collection Audiobook	Just After Sunset (narrated by Stephen King, Jill Eikenberry, Holter Graham, George Guidall, Ron McLarty, Denis O'Hare, Ben Shenkman, Mare Winningham)	Nominated	
Audie Award	2014	Best Fiction Audiobook	Doctor Sleep (narrated by Will Patton)	Won	
Audie Award	2014	Best Solo Narration — Male	Doctor Sleep (narrated by Will Patton)	Nominated	
Audie Award	2015	Best Fiction Audiobook	Mr. Mercedes (narrated by Will Patton)	Nominated	
Audie Award	2015	Best Solo Narration — Male	Mr. Mercedes (narrated by Will Patton)	Nominated	
Audie Award	2016	Best Male Narrator	Finders Keepers (narrated by Will Patton)	Nominated	
Audie Award	2016	Best Original Work	Drunken Fireworks (narrated by Tim Sample)	Nominated	
Audie Award	2017	Best Fiction Audiobook	End of Watch (narrated by Will Patton)	Nominated	
Audie Award	2017	Best Male Narrator	End of Watch (narrated by Will Patton)	Nominated	
Audie Award	2019	Best Thriller / Suspense Audiobook	The Outsider (narrated by Will Patton)	Nominated	
Audie Award	2019	Best Male Narrator	Pet Sematary (narrated by Michael C. Hall)	Nominated	
Audie Award	2020	Best Thriller / Suspense Audiobook	The Institute (narrated by Santino Fontana)	Won	
Audie Award	2021	Best Thriller / Suspense Audiobook	If It Bleeds (narrated by Will Patton, Danny Burstein, and Steven Weber)	Nominated	
Audie Award	2022	Mystery	Later	Won	
BBC	2003	The Big Read	The Stand	53rd	
BBC	2003	The Big Read	It	144th	
BBC	2003	The Big Read	The Green Mile	146th	
Balrog Award	1979	Best Collection / Anthology	Night Shift	Nominated	
Balrog Award	1979	Best Novel	The Stand	Nominated	
Balrog Award	1980	Best Novel	The Dead Zone	Nominated	
Balrog Award	1980	Best Novel	The Stand	Nominated	
Balrog Award	1980	Best Collection / Anthology	Night Shift	Won	
Balrog Award	1981	Best Novel	Firestarter	Nominated	
Balrog Award	1982	Best Novel	Cujo	Nominated	
Balrog Award	1983	Best Artist	Stephen King	Nominated	
Black Quill Award	2007	Best Dark Scribble	"The Gingerbread Girl"	Nominated	
Black Quill Award	2008	Best Dark Genre Novel	Duma Key	Won	
Black Quill Award	2008	Best Dark Genre Book Trailer	Duma Key (produced by Scribner)	Nominated	
Black Quill Award	2010	Dark Genre Novel of the Year	Under the Dome	Nominated	
Black Quill Award	2010	Best Dark Genre Book Trailer	Under the Dome (produced by Scribner)	Nominated	
Bram Stoker Award	1987	Best Novel	Misery	Won	
Bram Stoker Award	1988	Best Novelette	"The Night Flier"	Nominated	
Bram Stoker Award	1990	Best Fiction Collection	Four Past Midnight	Won	
Bram Stoker Award	1990	Best Novelette	"The Langoliers"	Nominated	
Bram Stoker Award	1991	Best Novel	Needful Things	Nominated	
Bram Stoker Award	1991	Best Novel	The Dark Tower III: The Waste Lands	Nominated	
Bram Stoker Award	1993	Best Fiction Collection	Nightmares & Dreamscapes	Nominated	
Bram Stoker Award	1994	Best Novel	Insomnia	Nominated	
Bram Stoker Award	1995	Best Novelette	"Lunch at the Gotham Cafe"	Won	
Bram Stoker Award	1996	Best Novel	The Green Mile	Won	
Bram Stoker Award	1997	Best Long Fiction	"Everything's Eventual"	Nominated	
Bram Stoker Award	1998	Best Novel	Bag of Bones	Won	
Bram Stoker Award	1998	Best Short Fiction	"Autopsy Room Four"	Nominated	
Bram Stoker Award	1999	Best Novel	"Low Men in Yellow Coats"	Nominated	
Bram Stoker Award	1999	Best Fiction Collection	Hearts in Atlantis	Nominated	
Bram Stoker Award	2000	Best Long Fiction	"Riding the Bullet"	Nominated	
Bram Stoker Award	2000	Best Non-Fiction	On Writing: A Memoir of the Craft	Won	
Bram Stoker Award	2001	Best Novel	Black House (co-written with Peter Straub)	Nominated	
Bram Stoker Award	2002	Best Novel	From a Buick 8	Nominated	
Bram Stoker Award	2002	Best Fiction Collection	Everything's Eventual	Nominated	
Bram Stoker Award	2003	Best Novel	The Dark Tower V: Wolves of the Calla	Nominated	
Bram Stoker Award	2003	Best Short Fiction	"Harvey's Dream"	Nominated	
Bram Stoker Award	2004	Best Novel	The Dark Tower VII: The Dark Tower	Nominated	
Bram Stoker Award	2004	Best Long Fiction	"Lisey and the Mad Man"	Nominated	
Bram Stoker Award	2005	Best Long Fiction	"The Things They Left Behind"	Nominated	
Bram Stoker Award	2006	Best Novel	Lisey's Story	Won	
Bram Stoker Award	2009	Best Novel	Duma Key	Won	
Bram Stoker Award	2009	Best Fiction Collection	Just After Sunset	Won	
Bram Stoker Award	2011	Best Fiction Collection	Full Dark, No Stars	Won	
Bram Stoker Award	2012	Best Short Fiction	"Herman Wouk is Still Alive"	Won	
Bram Stoker Award	2014	Best Novel	Doctor Sleep	Won	
Bram Stoker Award	2018	Best Novel	Sleeping Beauties (co-written with Owen King)	Nominated	
British Fantasy Award	1981	Novel (August Derleth Award)	Firestarter	Nominated	
British Fantasy Award	1981	Best Short Fiction	"Crouch End"	Nominated	
British Fantasy Award	1982	Novel (August Derleth Award)	Cujo	Won	
British Fantasy Award	1982	Best Short Fiction	"The Monkey"	Nominated	
British Fantasy Award	1983	Best Short Fiction	"Apt Pupil"	Nominated	
British Fantasy Award	1983	Best Short Fiction	"The Breathing Method"	Won	
British Fantasy Award	1987	Novel (August Derleth Award)	It	Won	
British Fantasy Award	1991	Best Collection	Four Past Midnight	Nominated	
British Fantasy Award	1999	Novel (August Derleth Award)	Bag of Bones	Won	
British Fantasy Award	2000	Best Collection	Hearts in Atlantis	Nominated	
British Fantasy Award	2003	Best Collection	Everything's Eventual	Nominated	
British Fantasy Award	2005	Novel (August Derleth Award)	The Dark Tower VII: The Dark Tower	Won	
British Fantasy Award	2009	Best Collection	Just After Sunset	Nominated	
British Fantasy Award	2009	Best Short Fiction	"N."	Nominated	
British Fantasy Award	2010	Novel (August Derleth Award)	Under the Dome	Nominated	
British Fantasy Award	2011	Best Collection	Full Dark, No Stars	Won	
British Fantasy Award	2011	Best Novella	"1922"	Nominated	
British Fantasy Award	2012	British Fantasy Award for Best Horror Novel (August Derleth Award)	11/22/63	Nominated	
British Fantasy Award	2020	British Fantasy Award for Best Horror Novel (August Derleth Award)	The Institute	Nominated	
Colorado Blue Spruce Young Adult Book Award	1989	Best Novel	The Eyes of the Dragon	Won	
Colorado Blue Spruce Young Adult Book Award	1991	Best Collection	Pet Sematary	Won	
Colorado Blue Spruce Young Adult Book Award	1994	Best Novel	It	Nominated	
Colorado Blue Spruce Young Adult Book Award	2001	Best Novel	The Green Mile	Nominated	
Colorado Blue Spruce Young Adult Book Award	2011	Best Novella	Under the Dome	Nominated	
Deutscher Phantastik Preis	2000	Best International Novel	Hearts in Atlantis	Won	
Deutscher Phantastik Preis	2001	Best International Novel	The Girl Who Loved Tom Gordon	Nominated	
Deutscher Phantastik Preis	2002	Best International Novel	Dreamcatcher	Nominated	
Deutscher Phantastik Preis	2003	Best International Novel	Black House (co-written with Peter Straub)	Won	
Deutscher Phantastik Preis	2003	International Author of the Year	Stephen King	Nominated	
Deutscher Phantastik Preis	2004	International Author of the Year	Stephen King	Won	
Deutscher Phantastik Preis	2004	Best International Novel	The Dark Tower V: Wolves of the Calla	Nominated	
Deutscher Phantastik Preis	2005	Best International Novel	The Dark Tower VII: The Dark Tower	Won	
Deutscher Phantastik Preis	2007	Best International Novel	Lisey's Story	Nominated	
Deutscher Phantastik Preis	2014	Best International Novel	Doctor Sleep	Nominated	
Dragon Award	2018	Best Horror Novel	Sleeping Beauties	Won	
Edgar Award	2014	Best Paperback Original	Joyland	Nominated	
Edgar Award	2015	Best Novel	Mr. Mercedes	Won	
Edgar Award	2016	Best Short Story	"Obits"	Won	
Edgar Award	2017	Best Short Story	"The Music Room"	Nominated	
Eisner Award	2011	Best New Series	American Vampire (with creators Scott Snyder and Rafael Albuquerque)	Won	
Entertainment Weekly	2008	100 Best Reads from 1983 to 2008	On Writing: A Memoir of the Craft	21st	
Fantafestival	1992	Best Screenplay	Sleepwalkers	Won	
Fantasporto	1988	Grande Prémio Fantasporto	Maximum Overdrive	Nominated	
Gandalf Award	1978	Book-Length Fantasy	The Shining	Nominated	
Gandalf Award	1979	Book-Length Fantasy	The Stand	Nominated	
Golden Raspberry Award	1986	Worst Director	Maximum Overdrive (directed by Stephen King)	Nominated	
Goodreads Choice Awards	2009	Mystery and Thriller	Under the Dome	Nominated	
Goodreads Choice Awards	2011	Science Fiction	11/22/63	Won	
Goodreads Choice Awards	2012	Fantasy	The Dark Tower: The Wind Through the Keyhole	Won	
Goodreads Choice Awards	2013	Horror	Doctor Sleep	Won	
Goodreads Choice Awards	2013	Mystery and Thriller	Joyland	Nominated	
Goodreads Choice Awards	2014	Mystery and Thriller	Mr. Mercedes	Won	
Goodreads Choice Awards	2015	Mystery and Thriller	Finders Keepers	Nominated	
Goodreads Choice Awards	2016	Mystery and Thriller	End of Watch	Won	
Goodreads Choice Awards	2017	Horror	Sleeping Beauties (co-written with Owen King)	Won	
Goodreads Choice Awards	2018	Mystery and Thriller	The Outsider	Won	
Goodreads Choice Awards	2018	Horror	Elevation	Won	
Goodreads Choice Awards	2018	Horror	Flight or Fright (as editor & contributor with Bev Vincent)	Nominated	
Goodreads Choice Awards	2019	Horror	The Institute	Won	
Goodreads Choice Awards	2020	Horror	If It Bleeds	Nominated	
Goodreads Choice Awards	2021	Mystery & Thriller	Billy Summers	Nominated	
Goodreads Choice Awards	2021	Horror	Later	Nominated	
Goodreads Choice Awards	2022	Horror	Gwendy's Final Task (co-written with Richard Chizmar)	Nominated	
Goodreads Choice Awards	2022	Fantasy	Fairy Tale	Nominated	
Goodreads Choice Awards	2023	Horror	Holly	Won	
Goodreads Choice Awards	2024	Horror	You Like It Darker	Won	
Hugo Award	1977	Best Dramatic Presentation	Carrie (directed by Brian De Palma; screenplay by Lawrence D. Cohen)	Nominated	
Hugo Award	1982	Best Non-Fiction Book	Danse Macabre	Won	
Hugo Award	2016	Best Novelette	"Obits"	Nominated	
International Association of Crime Writers	2014	Hammett Prize	Mr. Mercedes	Won	
International Horror Guild Award	1999	Best Television Program	Storm of the Century	Won	
International Horror Guild Award	2000	Best Long Story	"Riding the Bullet"	Nominated	
International Horror Guild Award	2000	Best Nonfiction	On Writing: A Memoir of the Craft	Won	
International Horror Guild Award	2001	Best Novel	Black House (co-written with Peter Straub)	Nominated	
International Horror Guild Award	2002	Best Novel	From a Buick 8	Nominated	
International Horror Guild Award	2002	Best Collection	Everything's Eventual	Nominated	
International Horror Guild Award	2002	Best Television Program	Rose Red (directed by Craig R. Baxley)	Nominated	
International Horror Guild Award	2003	Best Novel	The Dark Tower V: Wolves of the Calla	Nominated	
International Horror Guild Award	2004	Best Television Program	Kingdom Hospital	Nominated	
International Horror Guild Award	2006	Best Novel	Lisey's Story	Nominated	
International Thriller Writers Award	2012	Best Hardcover Novel	11/22/63	Won	
International Thriller Writers Award	2014	Best Hardcover Novel	Doctor Sleep	Nominated	
Italia Award	1999	Best International Novel	The Dark Tower IV: Wizard and Glass	Nominated	
Japan Booksellers' Award	2014	Best Translated Novel	11/22/63 (translated by Rō Shiraishi)	Nominated	
Locus Award	1978	Best Fantasy Novel	The Shining	Nominated	
Locus Award	1979	Best Novel	The Stand	Nominated	
Locus Award	1979	Best Collection	Night Shift	Nominated	
Locus Award	1979	Best Novelette	The Gunslinger	Nominated	
Locus Award	1980	Best Fantasy Novel	The Dead Zone	Nominated	
Locus Award	1980	Best Short Story	The Crate	Nominated	
Locus Award	1981	Best Science Fiction Novel	Firestarter	Nominated	
Locus Award	1981	Best Fantasy Novel	The Mist	Nominated	
Locus Award	1981	Best Novelette	The Way Station	Nominated	
Locus Award	1982	Best Fantasy Novel	Cujo	Nominated	
Locus Award	1982	Best Non-Fiction Book	Danse Macabre	Won	
Locus Award	1983	Best Collection	Different Seasons	Nominated	
Locus Award	1983	Best Novella	The Breathing Method	Nominated	
Locus Award	1983	Best Novelette	The Raft	Nominated	
Locus Award	1983	Best Short Story	It Grows on You	Nominated	
Locus Award	1984	Best Fantasy Novel	Christine	Nominated	
Locus Award	1984	Best Fantasy Novel	Pet Sematary	Nominated	
Locus Award	1985	Best Fantasy Novel	The Talisman (co-written with Peter Straub)	Nominated	
Locus Award	1985	Best Novella	The Ballad of the Flexible Bullet	Nominated	
Locus Award	1986	Best Collection	Skeleton Crew	Won	
Locus Award	1987	Best Fantasy Novel	It	Nominated	
Locus Award	1988	Best Fantasy Novel	The Dark Tower II: The Drawing of the Three	Nominated	
Locus Award	1988	Best Science Fiction Novel	The Tommyknockers	Nominated	
Locus Award	1990	Best Horror Novel	The Dark Half	Nominated	
Locus Award	1991	Best Collection	Four Past Midnight	Nominated	
Locus Award	1991	Best Horror Novel	The Stand	Nominated	
Locus Award	1992	Best Horror Novel	Needful Things	Nominated	
Locus Award	1992	Best Horror Novel	The Dark Tower III: The Waste Lands	Nominated	
Locus Award	1993	Best Horror Novel	Dolores Claiborne	Nominated	
Locus Award	1994	Best Collection	Nightmares & Dreamscapes	Nominated	
Locus Award	1994	Best Novella	The Ten O'Clock People	Nominated	
Locus Award	1995	Horror Novel	Insomnia (novel)	Nominated	
Locus Award	1996	Horror Novel	Rose Madder	Nominated	
Locus Award	1996	Best Novelette	Lunch at the Gotham Café	Nominated	
Locus Award	1997	Best Horror Novel	Desperation	Won	
Locus Award	1997	Best Horror Novel	The Green Mile	Nominated	
Locus Award	1998	Best Fantasy Novel	The Dark Tower IV: Wizard and Glass	Nominated	
Locus Award	1998	Best Art Book	The Dark Tower IV: Wizard and Glass (illustrated by Dave McKean)	Nominated	
Locus Award	1998	Best Novella	Everything's Eventual	Nominated	
Locus Award	1999	Best Horror Novel	Bag of Bones	Won	
Locus Award	2000	Best Collection	Hearts in Atlantis	Nominated	
Locus Award	2001	Best Non-Fiction	On Writing: A Memoir of the Craft	Won	
Locus Award	2002	Best Fantasy Novel	Black House (co-written with Peter Straub)	Nominated	
Locus Award	2003	Best Collection	Everything's Eventual	Nominated	
Locus Award	2004	Best Fantasy Novel	The Dark Tower V: Wolves of the Calla	Nominated	
Locus Award	2005	Best Fantasy Novel	The Dark Tower VI: Song of Susannah	Nominated	
Locus Award	2007	Best Fantasy Novel	Lisey's Story	Nominated	
Locus Award	2008	Best Short Story	Graduation Afternoon	Nominated	
Locus Award	2010	Best Nonfiction/Art Book	The Dark Tower: The Little Sisters of Eluria (adapted by Robin Furth; script by Peter David; illustrated by Richard Isanove, Luke Ross, and Michael Whelan)	Nominated	
Locus Award	2010	Best Science Fiction Novel	Under the Dome	Nominated	
Locus Award	2012	Best Science Fiction Novel	11/22/63	Nominated	
Locus Award	2012	Best Novelette	The Little Green God of Agony	Nominated	
Locus Award	2014	Best Fantasy Novel	Doctor Sleep	Nominated	
Locus Award	2014	Best Fantasy Novel	Joyland	Nominated	
Locus Award	2015	Best Fantasy Novel	Revival	Nominated	
Locus Award	2019	Best Horror Novel	The Outsider	Nominated	
Locus Award	2020	Best Horror Novel	The Institute	Nominated	
Locus Award	2021	Best Collection	If It Bleeds	Nominated	
Locus Award	2022	Best Horror Novel	Later	Nominated	
Locus Award	2022	Best Horror Novel	Billy Summers	Nominated	
Locus Award	2023	Best Horror Novel	Gwendy's Final Task (with Richard Chizmar)	Nominated	
Locus Award	2025	Best Collection	You Like It Darker	Nominated	
Los Angeles Times Book Prize	2011	Mystery / Thriller	11/22/63	Won	
Modern Library 100 Best Novels	1998	Reader's List	The Stand	29th	
Modern Library 100 Best Novels	1998	Reader's List	It	84th	
Mystery Writers of Japan	2012	Tozai Mystery Best 100	Misery	61st	
National Magazine Award	2004	Fiction	"Rest Stop"	Won	
National Magazine Award	2007	Fiction	"Willa"	Nominated	
National Magazine Award	2013	Fiction	"Batman and Robin Have an Altercation"	Won	
Nebula Award	1980	Best Novelette	"The Way Station"	Nominated	
New York Public Library	1982	Books for the Teen Age	Firestarter	Won	
New York Public Library	1995	Books of the Century	Carrie	Selected	
New York Times Book Review	2011	10 Best Books of 2011	11/22/63	Selected	
O. Henry Award	1996	Best American Short Story	"The Man in the Black Suit"	Won	
Online Film & Television Association	1997	Best Writing of a Motion Picture or Miniseries	The Shining	Won	
Primetime Emmy Award	1994	Outstanding Limited or Anthology Series	The Stand	Nominated	
Primetime Emmy Award	1997	Outstanding Limited or Anthology Series	The Shining	Nominated	
Prix Ozone Award	1997	Best Foreign Novel - Horror	Desperation	Won	
Quill Award	2005	Sports	Faithful (co-written with Stewart O'Nan)	Won	
Quill Award	2005	Science Fiction / Fantasy / Horror	The Dark Tower VII: The Dark Tower	Nominated	
Quill Award	2006	Science Fiction / Fantasy / Horror	Cell	Nominated	
Shirley Jackson Award	2008	Best Novella	"N."	Nominated	
Shirley Jackson Award	2008	Best Collection	Just After Sunset	Nominated	
Shirley Jackson Award	2009	Best Novelette	"Morality"	Won	
Shirley Jackson Award	2015	Single-Author Collection	The Bazaar of Bad Dreams	Won	
Takarajimasha	1991	Kono Mystery ga Sugoi!	Misery	4th	
Takarajimasha	1993	Kono Mystery ga Sugoi!	It	4th	
Takarajimasha	1998	Kono Mystery ga Sugoi!	The Green Mile	3rd	
Takarajimasha	2002	Kono Mystery ga Sugoi!	The Stand	8th	
Takarajimasha	2014	Kono Mystery ga Sugoi!	11/22/63	1st	
Takarajimasha	2017	Kono Mystery ga Sugoi!	Mr. Mercedes	3rd	
US Magazine	1982	Best Fiction Writer of the Year	Stephen King	Won	
University of Southern California	1991	USC Scripter Award	Misery (shared with screenwriter William Goldman)	Nominated	
University of Southern California	1994	USC Scripter Award	The Shawshank Redemption (shared with screenwriter Frank Darabont)	Won	
University of Southern California	1999	USC Scripter Award	The Green Mile (shared with screenwriter Frank Darabont)	Nominated	
World Fantasy Award	1976	Best Novel	'Salem's Lot	Nominated	
World Fantasy Award	1979	Best Novel	The Stand	Nominated	
World Fantasy Award	1979	Best Collection	Night Shift	Nominated	
World Fantasy Award	1981	Best Novel	"The Mist"	Nominated	
World Fantasy Award	1982	Best Short Story	"Do the Dead Sing?"	Won	
World Fantasy Award	1983	Best Collection	Different Seasons	Nominated	
World Fantasy Award	1983	Best Novella	"The Breathing Method"	Nominated	
World Fantasy Award	1984	Best Novel	Pet Sematary	Nominated	
World Fantasy Award	1985	Best Novel	The Talisman (co-written with Peter Straub)	Nominated	
World Fantasy Award	1985	Best Novella	"The Ballad of the Flexible Bullet"	Nominated	
World Fantasy Award	1986	Best Collection	Skeleton Crew	Nominated	
World Fantasy Award	1987	Best Novel	It	Nominated	
World Fantasy Award	1987	Best Short Story	"The End of the Whole Mess"	Nominated	
World Fantasy Award	1988	Best Novel	Misery	Nominated	
World Fantasy Award	1995	Best Short Story	"The Man in the Black Suit"	Won	
World Fantasy Award	2000	Best Collection	Hearts in Atlantis	Nominated	
World Fantasy Award	2007	Best Novel	Lisey's Story	Nominated	
World Fantasy Award	2012	Best Novel	11/22/63	Nominated	
