= The Plant (novel) =

Novel by Stephen King

- Cover of the original eBook release
- Author: Stephen King
- Language: English
- Genre: Horror
- Publisher: Philtrum Press
- Publication date: 1982; 1983; 1985; 2000
- Publication place: United States
- Media type: eBook
- Website: The Plant: Zenith Rising

The Plant is an unfinished serial novel by American writer Stephen King, published from 1982 to 1985 privately and in 2000 as a commercial eBook.

== Plot summary ==
A common ivy.

The story, told in epistolary format consisting entirely of letters, memos and correspondence, is about an editor, John Kenton, in a paperback publishing house who gets a manuscript from what appears to be a crackpot. The manuscript is about magic, but it also contains photographs that seem very real. The editor writes the author, Carlos Dettweiller, a rejection slip, but because of the photographs, he also informs the police where the author lives. This enrages the author, who sends a mysterious plant, which appears to be a common ivy, to the editor's office.

== Background ==
In the early 1980s, American author Stephen King wrote three installments of a story called The Plant and sent them out as chapbooks to his friends, instead of Christmas cards. King stated at the time that, "If I gave someone a coffee maker and they sold it at a yard sale, it wouldn't bother me. [...] If they want to sell 'The Plant,' fine. It's theirs. They can tear out the pages and use 'em for toilet paper, if that's what they feel like doing." King's publishing house, Philtrum Press, printed three installments in 1982, 1983 and 1985; these original chapbooks have since become hotly sought-after collector's items. After just three installments, King shelved the story as he felt it bore too much resemblance to comedy horror film The Little Shop of Horrors (1960).

In March 2000, King published the novella Riding the Bullet over the Internet, making it the world's first mass market eBook. An estimated 500,000 people downloaded the novella; however, the actual figures were unknown, as the encryption caused countless computers to crash. Additionally, hackers eventually cracked the encryption.

== Publication ==
Encouraged by the success of Riding the Bullet, later that year, King began releasing The Plant directly via his website, unencrypted and in installments. Readers could pay a $1 fee for each installment using the honor system. Three options were available: pay now through Amazon.com, an agreement to pay later, or refusal to pay; when clicked, the latter prompted a message to display on the website, reading, "No stealing from the blind newsboy." King said, however, that he would drop the project after publication of the second chapter, if the percentage of paying readers fell below 75 percent. He viewed the release as an experiment in alternate forms of distribution, writing on his website at the time, "My friends, we have the chance to become Big Publishing's worst nightmare." Susan Moldow, King's publisher at Scribner, stated that she "[doesn't] feel particularly threatened".

The book received around 76 percent of paying readers for its first installment and was downloaded more than 152,000 times. (Note: The exact figures were 152,132 downloads, with 116,200 people having paid, which equated to 76.38 per cent of readers, as noted by King in a July, 31 post on his website.) A day after the release of the first part, King stated on his website that his experiment "seems to be working". In a post minutes later, he stated that, despite questioning whether readers would actually pay to read the novel, he was surprised that readers were paying, leaving him "faced with the real possibility of finishing The Plant". Believing that interest in the novel would fade if he continued to publish installments of only 5,000 words, King proposed to increase the word length of subsequent installments, with Part Two being 6,000–7,000 words and Part Three being 10,000–12,000 words; the download price would remain at $1. He proposed that "installments 4 through 7 or 8 would be much longer – perhaps as long as 25,000 words – and the download price would go up to $2.50". On July 31, King posted an update to his website, commented that he was working "hard" on the novel.

By August 25, following the release of installment two, King claimed on a website post that, while Part One had been a "considerable success", the results with Part Two were "less clear", with King reporting that technical problems occurred and people were unable to download the story. King claimed that, although downloads "remain[ed] strong", the total was less than the previous installment; King suggested readers were unaware that payment had to be made for each time an installment was downloaded, rather than a one-time payment for multiple downloads. In the same post, King reported that he had written another 50,000 words of the novel, with enough material saved up for three more installments. However, he would only make a decision to continue releasing more installments based on the paythrough for the third installment. He stated that, although he was enjoying the new material for the novel, he "ha[d] a great many other commitments, and the chances of it being finished or published in the near future would be slim". He suggested that he would only continue writing the novel if the response from readers was positive and that payment remained above 75%. King also stated that download cost for Part Three would remain at $1, but subsequent installments up to Part Eight would increase to $2, reasoning that the total price spent on the installments, $13, would equate to the total amount a trade paperback costs or a hardcover book discounted by 40%. Installments after that could be downloaded for free. The second installment received a payment rate of 70%, while the third installment was paid by at least 75% of readers.

On October 9, King stated in a website post that The Plant "would be going back into hibernation" after the sixth installment in December, citing his need to continue writing Black House (2001), co-written with Peter Straub. In addition, King stated that he needed to continue work on two new novels: Dreamcatcher (2001) and a Dark Tower novel; and to let the foreign translations of The Plant catch up with the American installments. King reassured readers about the fate of the novel, writing that, "The last time The Plant furled its leaves, the story remained dormant for nineteen years. If it could survive that, I'm sure it can survive a year or two while I work on other projects." King believed Part Six was the ideal place to stall progress on the novel, writing that, "In a traditional print book, it would be the end of the first long section (which I would probably call "Zenith Rising")." King stated he would release Part Six for free, to thank his readers for supporting the novel. However, he revealed that paythrough had dropped "radically" for Part Four, dropping below 50%; the actual figure was 46%, while the number of downloads had dropped to 40,000 readers. Despite this, installments five and six were released in November and December respectively. Marsha DeFillipo, King's assistant, later said that they "decided to continue [...] because both part five and six were already written".

In a response to a New York Times editorial criticising King's choice to release his serial novel online, King stated that he "learned a great many interesting things in the course of The Plant's run on the Internet (a run that's not over, incidentally, but only in hiatus)". King stated that his online novel was an experiment and that he enjoyed exploring the new medium, though he admitted that he "[didn't] believe the on-line publication of The Plant has done more than graze whatever potential it might have as a book".

In a final website post for the year, King stated on December 4 that, despite suspending the project after six installments, "the novel does conclude the first major phase of the story". King reiterated that the novel was "not finished online" and that it was "only on hiatus", due to his other commitments. The last installment was released for free on December 18, 2000. After six installments, King revealed that the novel, which he deemed "quite successful", would make a profit of at least $600,000, perhaps even $1,000,000. The final figure was $721,448; after expenses, the figure was $463,832.

The original installments are now available free of charge on King's official website, in Adobe Acrobat format.

=== Publication history ===
Original chapbooks	Publication date	eBook installments	Release date
Part One	November 1982	Part One	July 24, 2000
Part One	November 1982	Part Two	August 21, 2000
Part Two	November 1983	Part Two	August 21, 2000
Part Two	November 1983	Part Three	September 25, 2000
Part Three	November 1985	Part Three	September 25, 2000
Part Three	November 1985	Part Four	October 23, 2000
		Part Five	November 20, 2000
		Part Six	December 18, 2000

== Reception ==
Michelle Falkoff, writing for CNN.com, reviewed the first installment of the novel, commenting that "Part One does little more than set up the story" and that "substantively it's not quite worth the hoopla". However, Falkoff acknowledged that the first part "is just a teaser designed to spark interest". She praised the design of the novel, particularly the fonts used, and the low price for download. In a post on his website following the release of the first installment, King acknowledged that, "Some readers have been disappointed in the epistolary format ('Why should I pay for a bunch of office memos?' one Constant Reader asked)."

The New York Times were critical of King's online experiment, believing it to be "based on a false premise" and stating that it "demonstrated perhaps that readers would rather not pay at all [for online installments] and that in the broad forest of the Web, where all the trees stand more or less the same height, even Mr. King can be hard to see". The Times stated that the online novel was a mistake, writing that King's stories are read "in a single gulp" and, due to the nature of the serial novel, drawn out over months, the novel "withered mainly because its author misunderstood the nature of his readership". King wrote a response to the editorial, defending his choice to publish the novel online; The Times did not publish it, though King published it on his official website.
