= Bag of Bones =

1998 novel by Stephen King

- First edition cover
- Author: Stephen King
- Cover artist: Frank Oudeman
- Language: English
- Genre: Horror
- Publisher: Scribner
- Publication date: September 22, 1998
- Publication place: United States
- Media type: Print (Hardcover)
- Pages: 529
- ISBN: 978-0-684-85350-5

Bag of Bones is a 1998 horror novel by American writer Stephen King. It focuses on an author who suffers severe writer's block and delusions at an isolated lake house four years after the death of his wife. It won the 1999 Bram Stoker Award for Best Novel, the 1999 British Fantasy Award for Best Novel, and the 1999 Locus Award for Best Dark Fantasy/Horror Novel.

The book re-uses many basic plot elements of Daphne du Maurier's Rebecca, which is directly referenced several times in the book's opening pages; however, the relation of these elements (including a wife who is dead as the book opens, her posthumous effect on future romance, a drowning, and house haunted by the memories of previous inhabitants) to the plot and characters is markedly different. When the paperback edition of Bag of Bones was published by Pocket Books on June 1, 1999 (ISBN 978-0671024239), it included a new author's note at the end of the book, in which Stephen King describes his initial three-book deal with Scribner (Bag of Bones, On Writing, and a collection of short stories titled One Headlight, which later became Everything's Eventual), and devotes most of the piece describing the origins of the then-forthcoming Hearts in Atlantis.

== Background information ==
Stephen King had been publishing his books with Viking since The Dead Zone in 1979. In October 1997, after Viking published King's then-latest novel, Desperation (1996), and King's deal with Viking expired, it was being reported that King was seeking a large advance for his next novel ($17–18 million according to various reports) and 26% of gross sales, whereas his deal with Viking previously paid a $15 million advance per book. King also wanted to move to a more literary and prestigious publisher. Ultimately, King left Viking and on November 6, 1997 signed an initial three-book deal with Simon & Schuster, with a $2 million advance for Bag of Bones in addition to 50% profit-sharing. The novel, first reported to be a thousand pages but turned out to be nearly half that, was billed as "a haunted love story", and this phrase was printed on the back cover of the hardcover first edition, which had a print-run of 1.4 million copies.

== Plot summary ==
The narrator, Mike Noonan, a bestselling novelist, suffers severe writer's block after his pregnant wife Jo suddenly dies due to a brain aneurysm. Four years later, Mike, still grieving, is plagued by nightmares set at his summer house in TR-90 (an unincorporated town named for its map coordinates), Maine. He decides to confront his fears and moves to his vacation house on Dark Score Lake, known as "Sara Laughs".

On his first day, he meets Kyra, a 3-year-old girl and her young widowed mother, 20-year-old Mattie Devore. Mattie's father-in-law is Max Devore, an elderly rich man who will do anything to gain custody of his granddaughter, Kyra. Drawn to Kyra and Mattie, Mike hires John Storrow, a custody lawyer, for Mattie, and things start looking up. Mike begins to write again, and realizes that Jo's ghost is helping him to solve the mystery of Sara Tidwell, a blues singer whose ghost haunts the house. He also learns that Jo frequently returned to the town in the year before her death, without telling him.

Mike begins having recurring, disturbing dreams and visions, and realizes he shares a psychic connection with Kyra. Max and his personal assistant, Rogette, try to drown Mike but he survives with the help of his wife's spirit. Max unexpectedly commits suicide that same night. Mike sees a pattern when he sees that local inhabitants have names that begin with "K" or "C" and learns how relatives of townspeople have drowned in childhood.

While Storrow and the private detective he hired are celebrating the end of the custody battle, Mattie attempts to seduce Mike. As they are embracing, Mattie's trailer is subjected to a drive-by shooting, injuring Storrow and the detective and killing Mattie. The detective is able to kill the driver and incapacitate the shooter with Mike's help. Mike then grabs Kyra and drives back to his home as a violent thunderstorm begins. The shooter's buddies try to stop them, but refuse to follow him to "Sara Laughs". Under the influence of Sara's ghost, Mike is tormented to drown Kyra and commit suicide himself. Jo's ghost prevents him and calls his attention to the novel he has begun to write. In the pages there are clues that lead Mike to discover documents Jo had hidden, among them a genealogy showing Mike's blood relationship to one of the town families.

Several families whose origin lay within the town had firstborn children with "K" names who were all murdered—Kyra, as a descendant of Max Devore, is scheduled to be the next to die. The genealogy also shows that Mike and Jo's child would have been the next firstborn child with a "K" name in the family line. Mike realizes this must be Sara Tidwell's curse for something that had been done to her. He leaves and searches for Sara's grave, stopped by the ghosts of several members of the old families. He learns in a vision that these men had viciously raped and killed Sara, and drowned her son Kito in the lake; all the "K" children who died were descendants of those men. Mike reaches Sara's grave and succeeds in destroying her bones, ending the curse.

Upon returning to the house, Mike discovers that Rogette has kidnapped Kyra. He follows them to the lake, where Mattie's ghost appears and knocks Rogette into the water. Rogette tries to pull Mike in with her, but is impaled by the storm's wreckage from the dock. Mattie's ghost says her goodbyes to Mike and Kyra.

The novel ends with an epilogue, revealing that Mike has retired from writing and is attempting to adopt Kyra. His status as a single, unrelated male complicates things, and the adoption has taken longer than anticipated. The outcome of the adoption is left unresolved at the end, but the reader is given hope that it will be positive.

== Reception ==
The Magazine of Fantasy and Science Fiction reviewer Charles de Lint declared Bag of Bones to be "a powerful, moving novel." Elizabeth Hand praised it lavishly: "What is extraordinary here is how good the writing is. ... The characterizations are plummy, the dialogue sharp, and even the ghosts play second fiddle to Mike Noonan and his genuinely anguished midlife crisis."

== Awards ==
- 1999 Bram Stoker Award for Best Novel
- 1999 British Fantasy Award for Best Novel
- 1999 Locus Award for Best Dark Fantasy/Horror Novel

== Audio version ==
The audio version of Bag of Bones is noteworthy in several respects. Like most Stephen King books, the audio version is unabridged. It is read by Stephen King himself, one of several books he has read himself for audio version publication, including Hearts in Atlantis, Lunch at the Gotham Cafe, and In the Deathroom. Intermingled with the text are bits of music and a song sung by Sara Tidwell; this music and song were recorded specifically for the audio version of Bag of Bones. Finally, the audio version of this book includes an interview with Stephen King.

== Tenth Anniversary Edition ==
Bag of Bones: Tenth Anniversary Edition
- Author: Stephen King
- Cover artist: Frank Oudeman
- Language: English
- Genre: Horror novel
- Publisher: Scribner
- Publication date: October 21, 2008
- Publication place: United States
- Media type: Print (Paperback)
- Pages: 660
- ISBN: 1-4391-0621-5

A trade paperback edition was published in the fall of 2008, commemorating the tenth anniversary of the novel's release in 1998. It contained a Questions & Answers with Stephen King, along with "The Cat from Hell," a short story from his then upcoming collection Just After Sunset.

== Television adaptation ==
A 2 1/2-hour (approximately 4 hours with commercials) TV miniseries produced by Stewart Mackinnon and Mark Sennet, directed by Mick Garris and with teleplay by screenwriter Matt Venne aired on A&E in December 2011. Irish actor Pierce Brosnan plays Mike Noonan, with Broadway actress Anika Noni Rose taking the role of Sara Tidwell. Filming took place in and around Halifax, Nova Scotia, Canada in August and September 2011. The miniseries follows the book faithfully but changes minor details. Sara has a daughter named Kisha instead of a son named Kito. Mike is also well aware of his family's connections to Dark Score Lake, but not aware of the fact that his grandfather had been one of the men who attacked Sara. The miniseries also has Devore himself be the leader of Sara's attackers rather than his great grandfather. The ending of the miniseries was also slightly altered. Mike's confrontation with Rogette takes place in Mike's bathroom rather than near the lake. Mike kills her in self-defense with no aid from Mattie's ghost (though she does still appear at the end). The miniseries closes with Mike and Kyra going canoeing.
