= Blood and Smoke =

Audiobook

- Author: Stephen King
- Language: English
- Genre: Horror
- Publisher: Simon & Schuster audio
- Publication date: November 22, 1999
- Publication place: United States
- Media type: Audiobook
- ISBN: 978-0-671-04617-0

Blood and Smoke (1999) is an audiobook in which Stephen King reads three of his own short stories. At the time, King said that the two short stories which had not been published wouldn't be, but all three appeared in the Everything's Eventual collection.

All three stories in Blood and Smoke involve smoking in one way or another. The audiobook packaging resembles a pack of cigarettes, including the flip top.

== Short stories ==
- Lunch at the Gotham Café
- 1408
- In the Deathroom

== See also ==
- Short fiction by Stephen King
