= Everything's Eventual =

2002 story collection by Stephen King

- First edition cover
- Author: Stephen King
- Cover artist: Mark Stutzman
- Language: English
- Genre: Horror
- Publisher: Scribner
- Publication date: March 19, 2002
- Publication place: United States
- Media type: Print (hardcover)
- Pages: 464
- ISBN: 978-0-7432-3515-0
- Preceded by: Hearts in Atlantis
- Followed by: Just After Sunset

Everything's Eventual is a 2002 collection of 11 short stories and 3 novellas by American writer Stephen King.

== Stories ==
#	Title	Originally published in
1	"Autopsy Room Four"	Six Stories (1997)
2	"The Man in the Black Suit"	October 31, 1994 issue of The New Yorker
3	"All That You Love Will Be Carried Away"	January 29, 2001 issue of The New Yorker
4	"The Death of Jack Hamilton"	December 24/31, 2001 issue of The New Yorker
5	"In the Deathroom"	Blood and Smoke audiobook (1999)
6	"The Little Sisters of Eluria"	Legends (1998)
7	"Everything's Eventual"	October/November 1997 issue of The Magazine of Fantasy & Science Fiction
8	"L. T.'s Theory of Pets"	Six Stories (1997)
9	"The Road Virus Heads North"	999 (1999)
10	"Lunch at the Gotham Café"	Dark Love (1995)
11	"That Feeling, You Can Only Say What It Is in French"	June 22/29, 1998 issue of The New Yorker
12	"1408"	Blood and Smoke audiobook (1999)
13	"Riding the Bullet"	Riding the Bullet e-book (2000)
14	"Luckey Quarter"	June 30/July 2, 1995 issue of USA Weekend

"The Little Sisters of Eluria" is part of The Dark Tower series.

== Story order ==
In the introduction to the book, King describes the unusual method he used to sort the stories:

What I did was take all the spades out of a deck of cards plus a joker. Ace to King = 1-13. Joker = 14. I shuffled the cards and dealt them. The order in which they came out of the deck became the order of the stories, based on their position in the list my publisher sent me. And it actually created a very nice balance between the literary stories and the all-out screamers. I also added an explanatory note before or after each story, depending on which seemed the more fitting position. Next collection: selected by Tarot.

== Audio versions ==
The unabridged digital audiobook edition includes all fourteen stories, but the physical book-on-cd versions of the stories are spread out over several products. "L.T.'s Theory of Pets" is the only story not included in any of the book-on-cd collections, but rather as a standalone product.

Everything's Eventual: Five Dark Tales contains these stories:

- "Everything's Eventual" – read by Justin Long
- "Autopsy Room Four" – read by Oliver Platt
- "The Little Sisters of Eluria" – read by Boyd Gaines
- "Luckey Quarter" – read by Judith Ivey
- "The Road Virus Heads North" – read by Jay O. Sanders

The Man in the Black Suit: 4 Dark Tales contains these stories:

- "The Man in the Black Suit"
- "All That You Love Will Be Carried Away"
- "The Death of Jack Hamilton"
- "That Feeling, You Can Only Say What It Is in French"

Everything's Eventual: Volume 2 is a retitled edition of The Man in the Black Suit: 4 Dark Tales, along with the addition of "Riding the Bullet". It contains these stories:

- "The Man in the Black Suit"
- "All That You Love Will Be Carried Away"
- "The Death of Jack Hamilton"
- "That Feeling, You Can Only Say What It Is in French"
- "Riding the Bullet"

Blood and Smoke contains these stories:

- "1408"
- "In the Deathroom"
- "Lunch at the Gotham Cafe"

"L. T.'s Theory of Pets" and "Riding the Bullet" are available as individual single-story productions.

== Film adaptations ==
Of the stories King wrote for this collection, two became films and another is in the works. The novella Riding the Bullet became a direct-to-video film by the same name, released in 2004 and directed by Mick Garris, who made many films and TV miniseries of King's works, and the film 1408 (2007) appeared in theaters, starring John Cusack. "The Death of Jack Hamilton" was adapted for the screen for the first time as part of King's "Dollar Baby" deal, and an official teaser trailer for the film was released on September 1, 2012, with an expected release date in 2013. To date, the short film has never been officially released.

== See also ==
- Stephen King short fiction bibliography
