= The Secretary of Dreams =

Short story collections authored by Stephen King and illustrated by Glenn Chadbourne

The Secretary of Dreams is a series of graphic short story collections authored by Stephen King and illustrated by Glenn Chadbourne. Cemetery Dance Publications released the first volume in December 2006.

== Volume 1 ==
First edition Illustrated by Glenn Chadbourne

This volume includes six stories and was published in three editions:

"Slipcased Gift Edition" (Limited to 5,000 copies)
"Signed and traycased Limited Edition" (Limited to 750 copies)
"Deluxe signed Lettered Edition" (Limited to 52 copies with a deluxe traycase)

=== Heavily illustrated original texts ===
The following are the heavily illustrated versions of Stephen King's original texts that are included in Volume 1:

- "Home Delivery"
- "Jerusalem's Lot"
- "The Reach"

=== Graphical adaptations ===
The following are the graphic format adaptations of Stephen King's short stories that are included in Volume 1:

- "The Road Virus Heads North"
- "Uncle Otto's Truck"
- "Rainy Season"

== Volume 2 ==
First edition Illustrated by Glenn Chadbourne

Volume 2 of The Secretary of Dreams was released in October 2010; it also included six stories and was released in the same three limited editions as Volume 1.

=== Heavily illustrated original texts ===
The following are the heavily illustrated versions of Stephen King's original texts that are included in Volume 2:

- "The Monkey"
- "Strawberry Spring"
- "In the Deathroom"

=== Graphical adaptations ===
The following are the graphical adaptations of Stephen King's short stories that are included in Volume 2:

- "Gray Matter"
- "One for the Road"
- "Nona"

== See also ==
- List of comics based on fiction
