= Empire: For the SF Writer =

American SF zine

- Cover of Empire #34
- Categories: How to write SF/Fantasy
- Founded: 1976
- Final issue: 1989
- Country: United States

Empire: For the SF Writer was an American fanzine published from 1976 to 1989 that featured articles about how to successfully write science fiction and fantasy fiction. Many top names from the SF and fantasy fields were contributors.

== Contents ==
Empire was a "how to" for aspiring science fiction and fantasy writers, with articles on how to write sf/fantasy and get it published written by many well-known authors including Ardath Mayhar, Darrell Schweitzer, R. A. MacAvoy, Marion Zimmer Bradley, Don D'Ammassa, Charles Sheffield, Orson Scott Card, Steven Spruill, John Shirley, Stanley Schmidt, Ellen Datlow, George Scithers, and Jacqueline Lichtenberg.

The focus was on improving one's writing, for instance, creating better plotting and background. The zine also included listings of agents who handled sf writers, interviews with noted authors such as Kurt Vonnegut, and reviews. Short stories were also published; for example, Gene Wolfe's short story "Helioscope" first appeared in Empire.

== Publication history ==
Empire was originally created by Mark MacGarry and Ron Rogers in 1976 and published in Christianburg, Virginia. In the early 1980s, Kevin O'Donnell took over as publisher, and moved the zine to New Haven, Connecticut with Mary Kittredge as editor. The zine was offset printed by Unique Graphics of Oakland, California.

Empire, renamed Way Station, ceased publication in 1989.

== Reception ==
Jon Schuller, writing for Abyss, commented, "What makes it interesting is that these articles are not by fans bemoaning their own inability to write professionally, but by professional writers, some of them successes and some of them on the brink of success with strong ties to the fan press." Schuller also noted, "Most of the content of Empire is surprisingly good and usually helpful ... It is surprisingly free of the childishly awkward attempts at writing which plague most SF fanzines." Schuller concluded by giving the zine an overall rating of 6 out of 10, writing, "I can recommend Empire without reservation if you are an aspiring writer. It is useful, informative and enjoyable reading."

In Issue 12 of Janus, Greg Rihn thought the zine fulfilled its mission, commenting, "Not bad, attempting to be a prozine for pro writers."

Brian Earl Brown, writing for Whole Fanzine Catalog, commented, "Lots of advice for the would-be and beginning writer. As many a dozen "name" authors appear in each issue with some items relating to writing."

In Issue 41 of Science Fiction Review, Richard Geis noted, "This magazine, though overpriced, is of definite interest and value to those who are trying and want to be sf writers, as well as to those aficionados and collectors who want the 'inside sf' view of such." Three years later, Geis reviewed Empire #33 and pointed out that it was "Offset, but badly printed — fuzzy and faint in places (using paper plates, umm?) but of value to beginning and indeed some professional writers of sf and fantasy."
