= L. T.'s Theory of Pets =

- Short story by Stephen King
- Country: United States
- Language: English
- Genre: Horror short story

Publication
- Published in: Six Stories
- Publication type: Anthology
- Publisher: Philtrum Press
- Media type: Print (Paperback)
- Publication date: 1997

"L. T.'s Theory of Pets" is a horror short story by American writer Stephen King. It was originally published in the 1997 limited-edition collection Six Stories.

== Plot summary ==
The story is told from the first-person perspective of a working-class husband, who recalls a story told by L. T., a chatty co-worker, about the brewing trouble behind his marriage. These problems are attributed to pets purchased by L. T. and his wife, Cynthia. The wife purchases a dog for L. T. which dislikes him instantly and sides with his wife. Soon, L. T. purchases a cat for his wife, which immediately takes to L.T. instead. Despite the fact that the dog and the cat get along fine, L. T. and his wife continually argue. While riding home in the narrator's car, L.T. asks if his arrogance is to blame. L.T.'s wife eventually leaves him, saying she is going to her mother's house, but fails to arrive there. The narrator reveals that she has taken the dog with her, and her car was discovered abandoned on a deserted roadside in Nevada. The only thing found was her dog, axed to death.

It is revealed that a serial killer (dubbed "The Axe Man") is on the loose in the area, who kills women with an axe. L.T. still hopes she is alive, although this is unlikely.

== Publication ==
Stephen King said "L. T.'s Theory of Pets" was inspired by a Dear Abby editorial about how giving people pets as gifts may be viewed as arrogance in certain circles, because it assumes the receiver can—and wants to—look after the pet. King himself briefly discusses how he received a Pembroke Welsh Corgi as a present, and has enjoyed its company ever since.

"L. T.'s Theory of Pets" was originally published in the 1997 limited-edition collection Six Stories. In 2001, it was released as an audiobook with the recording of King reading the story live at Royal Festival Hall in London. In 2002, it was collected in King's collection Everything's Eventual.

== Reception ==
Rocky Wood describes the story as "entertaining if minor". Publishers Weekly opined that the "shift from humor to horror comes off as arbitrary, at least on the page (the story first appeared in audiobook form)".

== See also ==
- Stephen King short fiction bibliography
