= Foe Hammer =

Foe Hammer can refer to:

- The sword Glamdring (in Sindarin: 'glam'=foe, 'dring'=hammer) in the works of J. R. R. Tolkien
- King Roland of Delain's mighty arrow in Stephen King's novel The Eyes of the Dragon
- The primary weapons of the MCRN Donnager in The Expanse (novel series)
