= Rainy Season (short story) =

- Short story by Stephen King
- The cover of the issue of Midnight Graffiti in which "Rainy Season" was originally published
- Language: English
- Genre: Horror short story

Publication
- Published in: Midnight Graffiti
- Publication type: Magazine
- Publisher: Warner Books
- Media type: Print
- Publication date: Spring 1989

"Rainy Season" is a short horror story by Stephen King, first published in Midnight Graffiti in 1989, and later collected in King's book Nightmares & Dreamscapes in 1993.

== Plot summary ==
A young husband and wife on summer vacation rent a house in a small town called Willow, Maine, only to be warned repeatedly (if vaguely) to leave by the local inhabitants. They do not comply and, having purchased groceries, return to the house. They learn the price for prosperity the citizens of Willow must pay: every seven years a husband and wife will go there from outside and will stay, despite protests, to become sacrifices during the rainy season. When the "rain" starts, the couple learns the nature of the precipitation: an army of grotesque black toads the size of footballs, armed with needle-sharp teeth and able to chew through doors and walls. After the carnage, the toads melt away into poisonous sludge that is washed away easily. Two residents debate the price that is paid for their prosperity, but decide there is nothing they can do about it.

== Publication ==
The writing of "Rainy Season" ended a bout of writer's block from which King had been suffering. The story was first published in issue 3 of the magazine Midnight Graffiti in spring 1989. In 1993, it was republished in King's short story collection Nightmares & Dreamscapes collection. In 2006, a version of the story illustrated by Glenn Chadbourne was published as part of the Cemetery Dance Publications book The Secretary of Dreams, Volume One. The audiobook version of this story was narrated by actress Yeardley Smith.

== Reception ==
Wiater et al. compared it to Shirley Jackson's short story "The Lottery", an idea reinforced by the fact that one of the story's characters directly references Jackson's story at one point. Writing at Tor.com, Grady Hendrix called it a "time passer" that was likely expanded from a single surreal image.

== Adaptations ==
"Rainy Season" was adapted into a 2017 short film of the same name, written and directed by Vanessa Ionta Wright and produced by Above the Line Artistry.

In 2019, the story was again adapted, this time by Patrick Haischberger, and starring Thomas Stipsits, Sabrina Reiter, Inge Maux, Fritz Karl and Wolfgang Hübsch.

The audiobook of this story is read by actor Yeardley Smith.

== See also ==
- Stephen King short fiction bibliography
