= The Reach =

1981 short story by Stephen King

- Short story by Stephen King
- Original title: Do The Dead Sing?
- Country: United States
- Language: English
- Genre: Speculative fiction

Publication
- Published in: Yankee (1st release), Skeleton Crew
- Publication type: Magazine (1st release)
- Media type: Print (Periodical & Paperback)
- Publication date: November 1981

"The Reach" is a short story by American writer Stephen King. First published in Yankee in 1981 under the title "Do the Dead Sing?", it was later collected in King's 1985 collection Skeleton Crew.

== Plot summary ==
Stella Flanders, the oldest resident of Goat Island, has just celebrated her 95th birthday. She has never crossed "the Reach", the body of water that separates the island from the mainland, in her entire life. She tells her great-grandchildren when they ask, "I never saw any reason to go." Stella comes to the realization that the cancer that she's known she has, and kept to herself, is in its final stages when she starts seeing the deceased residents of Goat Island. Her visions start with her dead husband inviting her to "come across to the mainland."

As her impending death draws near, Stella encounters more apparitions of the dead of Goat Island, and she makes peace with the knowledge that it is her time to go. Dressed in her warmest clothes, plus her son's long johns and hat, Stella heads across the frozen reach toward the mainland.

As she starts her trek, it starts to snow - the blowing wind, along with the snow, makes it difficult for her to find her way and she becomes afraid of being lost in the storm. Along her walk, she meets up with the woman who was her best friend, Annabelle, as well as several others. When the wind whips the hat off of her head, her late husband, Bill, appears and gives her his hat. She is surrounded by her friends and family and they sing to her as she crosses over from this life.

Stella Flanders is found, dead, sitting upright on a rock on the mainland. Her son, Alden, recognizes his father's hat. He comes to believe that the dead sing and that they love those still living.

== Inspiration ==
Stephen King's inspiration for "The Reach" came about from the story his brother-in-law, Tommy, told him while in the Coast Guard. The real-life alter-ego of Stella Flanders lived and died on a small Maine Island, never setting foot on the mainland. She remained on a small stretch of land with a community so close, they were more like family. She had everything she needed on this island and had no need to cross the Reach until the day she died. Being intrigued by the idea of the Reach, and flabbergasted with Flanders' counterpart, King came up with the idea for this short story.

"The Reach" was the original title, but King changed it to "Do the Dead Sing?" when it was published in Yankee. When it was published in Skeleton Crew, King changed it back to the original title.

== Reception ==
Upon introducing Stephen King to an audience at Princeton in 1997, Joyce Carol Oates lauds King as a Gothic storyteller with his "startling images and metaphors, which linger long in the memory". Oates continues to praise King's New England saturated atmospheres as "a poetic evocation of that landscape, its history and its inhabitants". Oates mentions some of King's more gothic horror stories, most notable "The Reach", which she considers "elegantly composed". The story won the 1982 World Fantasy Award for short fiction.

== Adaptations ==
"The Reach" has been adapted by artist Glenn Chadbourne for the book The Secretary of Dreams, a collection of comics based on King's short fiction released by Cemetery Dance in December 2006. It was turned into a short film that was shown in the Short Film Corner at the Cannes Film Festival in 2018 produced by Landon Kestinger and Iona MacRitchie.

== See also ==
- Stephen King short fiction bibliography
- American Gothic Tales
