= The Road Virus Heads North =

1999 short story by Stephen King

- Short story by Stephen King
- Country: United States
- Language: English
- Genre: Horror short story

Publication
- Published in: 999 (1st release), Everything's Eventual
- Publication type: Anthology
- Media type: Print (Hardback & Paperback)
- Publication date: 1999

"The Road Virus Heads North" is a short story by Stephen King. The story first appeared in 999, an anthology published in 1999 and edited by Al Sarrantonio. In 2002, it was collected in King's Everything's Eventual.

King wove the story around a painting he has at his home, which is disliked by his family. King himself is a fan of "moving picture" stories, which inspired him to write this tale.

== Plot summary ==
Richard Kinnell, a successful horror writer, drives back home to Derry, Maine, from a literary conference in Boston. Along the way, Kinnell comes across a yard sale where he notices a bizarre, disturbing painting of a sinister-looking man with filed teeth driving a Pontiac Firebird across Boston's Tobin Bridge. Entitled The Road Virus Heads North, this painting was created by a tortured genius who burned all his other pieces of artwork before killing himself; the artist left a cryptic note explaining that he could not stand what was happening to him any longer, thus justifying his actions. Kinnell, an avid collector of such oddities, purchases the painting without hesitation from the woman running the sale.

As Kinnell travels north, he drops by his aunt's house to show her the painting. He quickly notices that some of the details in the painting have changed. He initially dismisses this by assuming he had not examined it closely enough. However, Kinnell quickly realizes that the painting is continuing to change. Deeply unsettled by his observations, he discards the painting at a nearby rest stop.

Upon arriving home, Kinnell discovers to his horror that the painting has somehow followed him. Now, it sits hanging above his fireplace. It has changed yet again, this time depicting a horrific scene of slaughter at the yard sale where he purchased it. Kinnell later overhears a news story about the brutal murder of the woman who sold him the painting. He soon realizes that the man in the painting actually exists, and the ever-changing painting shows him getting closer and closer to his home. Confident that this will destroy it once and for all, Kinnell tosses the painting into the fireplace and sets it alight. He then decides to take a shower. Without warning, Kinnell passes out and has a nightmare about the horrors he encountered throughout his day.

Upon awakening, Kinnell remembers that the artist burned all of his paintings, including this one. Thus, the painting survived Kinnell's attempt to destroy it, and the man in the painting has already arrived at his house. Kinnell tries to escape and fails in his attempt. Also, the painting gets him as well: the story's final passage describes Kinnell seeing the latest change to the painting, with fresh blood on the driver's seat, and realizing that it is portraying what is about to happen to him.

== Adaptations ==
"The Road Virus Heads North" was first filmed in 1999 by Dave Brock as a Stephen King "Dollar Baby" project and circulated on the film festival circuit.

The short story was adapted as an hour-long episode of the Turner Network Television mini-series Nightmares & Dreamscapes: From the Stories of Stephen King in 2006. The episode starred Tom Berenger as Kinnell.

It was also adapted by artist Glenn Chadbourne for the book The Secretary of Dreams, a collection of comics based on King's short fiction published by Cemetery Dance in December 2006.

== See also ==
- Stephen King short fiction bibliography
