= 999 (anthology) =

1999 horror and fantasy anthology

999: New Stories of Horror and Suspense
- First edition cover
- Editor: Al Sarrantonio
- Cover artist: Amy Halperin
- Language: English
- Genre: Horror and fantasy
- Publisher: Avon Books (hardcover), Perennial (paperback)
- Publication date: 1999
- Publication place: United States
- Media type: Print (hardcover and paperback)
- Pages: 666
- ISBN: 978-0-380-97740-6
- OCLC: 41039795
- Dewey Decimal: 813/.08738 21
- LC Class: PS648.H6 A16 1999

999: New Stories of Horror and Suspense (changed to 999: Twenty-Nine Original Tales of Horror and Suspense for the paperback; both generally shortened to 999) is a collection of short stories and novellas published in 1999 and edited by Al Sarrantonio. The title is a contraction of the year as well as 666 upside-down. All twenty-nine stories had never been published before. The book won the Bram Stoker Award for best original anthology and was on the final ballot for both the World Fantasy Award and the British Fantasy Award.

== Stories ==
- "Amerikanski Dead at the Moscow Morgue" by Kim Newman
- "The Ruins of Contracoeur" by Joyce Carol Oates
- "The Owl and the Pussycat" by Thomas M. Disch
- "The Road Virus Heads North" by Stephen King
- "Keepsakes and Treasures: A Love Story" by Neil Gaiman
- "Growing Things" by T.E.D. Klein
- "Good Friday" by F. Paul Wilson
- "Excerpts from the Records of the New Zodiac and the Diaries of Henry Watson Fairfax" by Chet Williamson
- "An Exaltation of Termagants" by Eric Van Lustbader
- "Itinerary" by Tim Powers
- "Catfish Gal Blues" by Nancy A. Collins
- "The Entertainment" by Ramsey Campbell
- "ICU" by Edward Lee
- "The Grave" by P.D. Cacek
- "The Shadow, The Darkness" by Thomas Ligotti
- "Knocking" by Rick Hautala
- "Rio Grande Gothic" by David Morrell
- "Des Saucisses, Sans Doute" Peter Schneider
- "Angie" by Ed Gorman
- "The Ropy Thing" by Al Sarrantonio
- "The Tree is My Hat" by Gene Wolfe
- "Styx and Bones" by Edward Bryant
- "Hemophage" by Steven Spruill
- "The Book of Irrational Numbers" by Michael Marshall Smith
- "Mad Dog Summer" by Joe R. Lansdale
- "The Theater" by Bentley Little
- "Rehearsals" by Thomas F. Monteleone
- "Darkness" by Dennis L. McKiernan
- "Elsewhere" by William Peter Blatty
