= Bag of Bones (miniseries) =

2011 American horror TV series

- Promotional poster
- Genre: Horror drama; Mystery
- Based on: Bag of Bones by Stephen King
- Screenplay by: Matt Venne
- Directed by: Mick Garris
- Starring: Pierce Brosnan; Annabeth Gish; Melissa George; Anika Noni Rose; Caitlin Carmichael
- Theme music composer: Nicholas Pike
- Country of origin: United States
- Original language: English
- No. of episodes: 2

Production
- Producer: Michael Mahoney
- Editors: Andrew Cohen; Patrick McMahon
- Running time: 162 Minutes

Original release
- Network: A&E
- Release: December 11, 2011

Bag of Bones or Stephen King's Bag of Bones, is an American Gothic horror television miniseries adaptation of Stephen King's 1998 novel of the same name. Directed by Mick Garris from Matt Venne's screenplay, it was first aired in 2011 on the A&E Network in two parts. When broadcast on Channel 5 on 29 December 2012, it was shown as a single 162-min film.

== Plot ==
Mike Noonan is a best-selling novelist who lives happily with his wife, Johanna "Jo" Noonan. During a book signing, Jo is hit by a bus while crossing the street from a nearby pharmacy. As she dies in his arms, Mike notices that Jo bought a pregnancy test, and assumes that she may have been having an affair as he had a low sperm count and was unable to conceive. Overcome by grief, Mike develops a case of writer's block. He suffers a series of nightmares about his wife and their summer home on Dark Score Lake in Maine. On advice from his brother, Sid, Mike takes a trip to the summer house.

Once there, he meets a young widow named Mattie Devore and her 6-year-old daughter, Kyra. Befriending them, he earns the ire of Mattie's estranged father-in-law Max Devore. Max has been trying to get custody of Kyra since Mattie shot his son Lance (Lance was trying to drown the child). Despite the turmoil, Mike begins to write again, but visions and nightmares lead him to believe he is not alone. He finds that his wife's spirit is with him. He also detects the spirit of a 1930s singer named Sara Tidwell who plays records of her music. Sara also appears in dreams that Mike has of her last day alive in 1939. During his stay at the lake, Mike learns about "Dark Score Crazy," an apparent form of madness that caused several men in the town to murder their daughters by drowning them.

Max and his assistant confront Mike while he is in the lake. Afterwards, Max gives Mike an offer that he will stop the custody battle for Kyra if Mike agrees to leave them alone and not press charges. Mike agrees to it, and Max after that commits suicide. At the funeral, Mike meets Edgar White, an old friend of his grandfather. Edgar confesses to Mike that Edgar, Mike's grandfather, and two other men assisted Max with the rape and murder of Sara Tidwell and the drowning of her daughter, Keisha. With her dying breath, Sara cursed the boys' descendants to drown their own daughters in retribution for drowning Keisha. The boys buried Sara with her daughter in the woods.

Mike tells Mattie the story. Mattie concludes that since Jo was pregnant, she returned to Dark Score and spent time investigating the curse on Mike's bloodline, not cheating on him as he hypothesized. Mattie is suddenly shot and killed in a manner that Mike saw in a dream, but before she dies she begs him to take care of Kyra. Mike is chased back to his home by Mattie's killers who turn out to be descendants of Sara's attackers obsessed with fulfilling the curse, but he escapes when they are caught by surprise and killed by a falling sign during a storm. Mike tries to console Kyra and puts her to bed. Max's spirit angrily compels Mike to drown Kyra in fulfillment of the curse, but Mattie's spirit struggles to thwart him. Mike takes refuge in his office, where he finds clues left by Jo in the story he had been writing, directing him to douse Sara and Keisha's remains with lye to end the curse.

A tree that had been transformed into the figure of a woman marks the burial site. Mike returns to this tree to recover the remains, but the tree haunted by Sara's spirit attempts to deter him. Jo appears and distracts Sara, allowing Mike time to use the lye to dissolve the bones. Sara's spirit is appeased and the tree returns to normal. Mike says a final goodbye to Jo. He returns home to find Kyra in the bathtub, and he is attacked by Max's assistant who tries to kill them both. Mike kills her, and Mattie's spirit appears before them. Mattie tells Kyra that she is safe and that Mike will take care of her. The next morning, Mike announces that he intends to adopt Kyra as his own daughter.

== Cast ==
- Pierce Brosnan as Mike Noonan
- Melissa George as Mattie
- Annabeth Gish as Jo Noonan
- Anika Noni Rose as Sara Tidwell
- William Schallert as Max Devore
  - David Sheftell as Young Max Devore
- Caitlin Carmichael as Kyra Devore
- Gary Levert as George Footman
- Matt Frewer as Sid Noonan
- Peter MacNeil as Bill Dean
- Jason Priestley as Marty

== Production ==
The project started when Mark Sennet of Sennet Entertainment and Stewart Mackinnon of Headline Pictures secured the rights to the novel and contracted Mick Garris to direct the project, Matt Venne to write the screenplay and attached Pierce Brosnan in the leading role. Filming started August 2011 in Nova Scotia. Singer Kelly Rowland was originally cast as the role of Sara Tidwell but was replaced by Anika Noni Rose.

== Reception ==
Entertainment Weekly's Ken Tucker thought the miniseries was "occasionally hokey, and Brosnan [overworked] his mad cackling, but the production [was] never less than creepily engaging." Troy Patterson of Slate called it "too campy," adding: "Bag of Bones attempts to say something about care-giving and leave-taking. But, much of the time ... it's busy trying to scare the pants off you and failing in the attempt." CraveOnline's Blair Marnell gave the miniseries a 6 out of 10 rating, commenting: "The greatest weakness of Bag of Bones is that it seems to be too intent upon maintaining the pace of King's novel to the detriment of the onscreen story."

Part One was watched by 3.37 million viewers and had a 1.1 with the 18-49 age range, Part Two dropped slightly to 2.99 million with a 0.9 rating.
