= Riding the Bullet (film) =

2004 film by Mick Garris

- Theatrical release poster
- Directed by: Mick Garris
- Written by: Mick Garris
- Based on: Riding the Bullet by Stephen King
- Produced by: Mick Garris; Brad Krevoy; David Lancaster; Greg Malcolm; Joel T. Smith; Vicki Sotheran
- Starring: Jonathan Jackson; David Arquette; Cliff Robertson
- Cinematography: Robert New
- Edited by: Marshall Harvey
- Music by: Nicholas Pike
- Production companies: Motion Picture Corporation of America; Apollo ProMedia; Riding the Bullet Production
- Distributed by: Innovation Film Group
- Release date: October 15, 2004
- Running time: 98 minutes
- Countries: United States; Canada; Germany
- Language: English
- Box office: $264,505

Riding the Bullet is a 2004 horror film written, co-produced and directed by Mick Garris. It is an adaptation of Stephen King's 2000 novella of the same name. The film, which received a limited theatrical release, was not successful in theaters; it earned a domestic gross of $134,711.

== Plot ==
Set in 1969, Alan Parker is a young artist, studying at the University of Maine, where his professor believes he is obsessed with death. On October 30, his birthday, he thinks his girlfriend, Jessica, is trying to break up with him. At home, Alan later gets high off of cannabis in his bathtub and begins to contemplate suicide by cutting his wrists.

The Grim Reaper then appears and tries to convince Alan to kill himself so that he can come to the other side. Murals of people painted on the wall also appear to be urging him to kill himself. Alan accidentally cuts himself when Jessica and a group of friends come in to surprise him for his birthday.

Later, Alan wakes up in the hospital. Jessica says that she is angry with him for the "selfish" act he attempted to commit, but also tells Alan that she loves him. She surprises him with concert tickets to see John Lennon in Toronto.

The next day, when Alan is released from the hospital, Jessica tells him that he has a wall around him, and Alan realizes that Jessica really was going to leave him. Alan gets a phone call that his mother, Jean, has had a stroke. He makes plans to go home that night, giving the concert tickets to his roommates.

As he tries to hitchhike home to Lewiston, Maine, Alan remembers the funeral of his father, Julian, when he was 6 years old. He envisions the death of his mother, and then himself, with a devastated Jessica weeping at his grave. He is picked up by a Volkswagen van that is driven by Ferris, an army deserter. They narrowly avoid a collision with an oncoming car, spinning out and landing in a ditch. Alan walks away from the incident shaken, but alive.

Alan begins to hallucinate and has multiple experiences with the living and the dead. He sees a billboard for "Ride The Bullet," a rollercoaster at Thrill Village, which triggers a memory of him standing in line with his mother to ride it, where he ultimately chickened out. He walks through a cemetery and comes across the grave of George Staub, whose grave marker indicates that he died two years ago.

Alan sees an apparition of himself come up through the ground, and the apparition tells him that they are saving a place for him. He is then picked up by a man who he realizes is George Staub. His apparition accompanies him in the car and warns him to not give his real information because there is something wrong with George.

Alan’s apparition notices the smell of formaldehyde from George, which prompts Alan to remember a phrase that he had read in a book, "The dead travel fast". Alan does not inform George that he knows that George is dead. George asks him about Thrill Village and asks if he rode "The Bullet" and Alan lies and said that he did go on the ride.

George knows that Alan is lying, and he calls Alan by his name. George explains that he was decapitated in a car crash when he tried to pass a truck on a two-lane road, and that he crashed into a produce truck when he swerved to avoid a collision with another car.

George tells Alan that he has to take one person with him, and that Alan has to choose whether it will be Alan's mother or Alan. If he does not make a choice, George warns that he will have to take them both. In a moment of panic and fear, Alan chooses his mother to be taken. George throws Alan out of the car, and when he wakes up, Alan is back in the cemetery. He hitches the next ride and finally makes it to the hospital. He is about to go see his mother, when George appears and beats him to the elevator.

Alan, now in his forties, says his mother died of a heart attack while watching television. He married his girlfriend Jessica, but the marriage only lasted a little while. Alan never made a living as an artist, but he continues to paint as a hobby. He goes back to Thrill Village and rides "The Bullet".

== Cast ==
- Jonathan Jackson – Alan Parker
- David Arquette – George Staub
- Cliff Robertson – Farmer
- Barbara Hershey – Jean Parker
- Erika Christensen – Jessica Hadley
- Barry W. Levy – Julian Parker
- Nicky Katt – Ferris
- Jackson Warris – Six-Year-Old Alan
- Jeff Ballard – 12-Year-Old Alan
- Peter LaCroix – Mature Alan
- Chris Gauthier – Hector Passmore
- Robin Nielsen – Archie Howard
- Matt Frewer – Mr. Clarkson
- Simon Webb – Grim Reaper
- Keith Dallas – Orderly
- Danielle Dunn-Morris – Mrs. Janey McCurdy

=== King casting connections ===
Ben Cotton played Hank in The Dead Zone (2002) TV series.

Sandra-Jessica Couturier played a Jury Member in The Dead Zone (2002) TV series.

Matt Frewer played Trashcan Man in The Stand (1994 TV miniseries), Dr. Charles George in Quicksilver Highway (1997 film), Ralph Carver in Desperation (2006 TV movie), and Sid Noonan in Bag of Bones (2011 TV miniseries).

Cynthia Garris played Laurie in Sleepwalkers (1992 film), Susan Stern in The Stand (1994 TV miniseries), 217 Woman in The Shining (1997 TV miniseries), and Ellen George in Quicksilver Highway (1997 film).

Robin Nielson played Billy Goatee in The Dead Zone (2002 TV series).

David Purvis played the Drunk in Kingdom Hospital (2004 TV series).

== Production ==
Mick Garris wrote an adaptation of Riding the Bullet, a Stephen King short story, on spec and struggled to find a purchaser during the early 00s as it wasn't an overt "balls-to-the-wall horror movie" compared to other King adaptations. In January 2003, Garris estimated that Riding the Bullet could possibly be released that year, followed by Stephen King's Desperation in 2004. That same month, Garris referred to the film as a "nostalgic drama" and a ghost story. In November 2003, production began in Vancouver with Jonathan Jackson, David Arquette, Barbara Hershey, and Erika Christensen joining the cast and Garris set as director.

Unlike the novella, Garris' adaptation takes place in 1969, the era that the filmmaker grew up in. Garris wanted to use John Lennon's Instant Karma! at the end of the film and was given permission by Yoko Ono. However, it would have cost $50,000 to license the song, which Garris claimed would have been more expensive than any other part of the film.

== Portrayal of Toronto Rock and Roll Revival ==
The film erroneously suggested that John Lennon's 1969 Toronto performance was publicly known in advance. The planned performance by Lennon was in fact kept a secret from the public until it happened. Lennon was also not advertised on posters promoting the event as being among the musicians who were performing.

== Release ==
Riding the Bullet was released on October 15, 2004, by Innovation Film Group. The film was initially slated to release on October 1, 2004.

=== Home media ===
The film was released on DVD on April 19, 2005, by Lions Gate Films Home Entertainment.

== Reception ==
=== Box office ===
Riding the Bullet grossed $101,107 in its opening weekend and ranked 33rd. The film would take in a domestic total of $134,711 before quickly leaving theaters. The film would accumulate $264,505 worldwide.

=== Critical reception ===
On review aggregator Rotten Tomatoes, Riding the Bullet holds an approval rating of 26% based on 23 reviews, with an average rating of 4.3/10. The site's critical consensus reads "Stephen King adaptation veteran director Mick Garris has lofty storytelling goals which ultimately flail and undercut the story's terror." On Metacritic, the film holds a weighted score of 37 out of 100 from 8 reviews, indicating "generally unfavorable reviews".

Review from Horror Bob (Robert Brodmerkel) On The Horror Review - "Overall, “Riding The Bullet” is an alright movie, I was kind of mixed about the film, but there were parts that did bore me. I think this is a film I will leave up to you guys to decide weather you like it or not. I for one thought it was alright but was leaning more towards not caring much for it."

Review by Luiz H.C. On bloody-disgusting.com "Riding the Bullet is no undiscovered masterpiece, but it doesn’t really have to be. Honestly, my favorite thing about the movie is its earnestness. The performances may not be Oscar-worthy and the script gets a bit too literal in its visual translation of King’s storytelling techniques, but the experience still captures the writer’s trademark introspective style without feeling farcical or cynical. It’s also one of the few horror movies I can comfortably watch with my mom, and I think that means something."

Review by Dalton Norman On screenrant.com "Riding the Bullet is a very Stephen King novella, but that doesn't mean it adapts well. Frequent collaborator Mick Garris wrote and directed the 2004 film version, and it was a noble effort at a deep and introspective story. Part nostalgic drama and part supernatural horror, Riding the Bullet was impossible to categorize, which didn't sit well with critics. It's important to watch Riding the Bullet with low expectations, and it takes imagination to see what the film is going for. It's a slick and spooky movie that mostly fails in execution. Some of the horror elements are downright cheesy, but they shouldn't distract from the great character work that Garris ports over from the original story."

Review by Eric Eisenberg On cinemablend.com "Mick Garris’ film adaptation of Riding The Bullet is not a fitting interpretation of the source material. Almost all of Stephen King’s narrative is present in the movie, and Garris’ script even goes as far as to crib dialogue straight from the text, but it’s buried in heaps of crap that is all clearly filler to get the material to feature length. Adding insult to injury, all of the nonsense not only dilutes the whole point of the story, but creates a tonal mess that prevents one from understanding how it’s all meant to be received."

== See also ==
- List of ghost films
