= David Palladini =

American illustrator (1946–2019)

David Palladini (April 1, 1946 – March 13, 2019) was an American illustrator, best known for his Aquarian Tarot deck (Morgan Press, 1970) and its reworking as the New Palladini Tarot (1997, U.S. Games Systems), and illustrations of children's books, especially The Girl Who Cried Flowers and other tales by Jane Yolen (T. Y. Crowell, 1973). His style is reminiscent of the Art Nouveau illustrations of Alfons Mucha and Aubrey Beardsley, and the Art Deco designs of Erté.

Palladini was born in Italy and immigrated to America as a child. His dual cultural background is expressed in the lush creativity of his work. After studying art, photography, and film at the Pratt Institute in New York City, he was a photographer at the 1968 Summer Olympic Games in Mexico City on his first job.

Palladini illustrated the second edition of a novel by Stephen King, The Eyes of the Dragon (Viking, 1987). The artwork was rendered in pencil and ink on Bienfeng velour paper. Depending on retention of the illustrations subsequently, that may be his most widely held work in WorldCat libraries. Otherwise Yolen's The Girl Who Cried Flowers is his most widely held, by a wide margin. He also did an edition of Beauty: A Retelling of the Story of Beauty and the Beast by Robin McKinley (1978), her first novel.

David's artistic memoir, The Journal of an Artist, a bracingly honest look at a man who chose to honor his authentic path by devoting his life to art, was published by Black Swan Press in 2011. David discusses his work on The Aquarian Tarot and the New Palladini Tarot in Painting the Soul: The Tarot Art of David Palladini, with co-author Anastasia Haysler, also published by Black Swan Press in 2013.

David has worked and lived in The Hamptons (New York State), Jamaica, and France. He spent the last years of his life in Newport Beach, California and continued to paint, write, and exhibit his work.

David died on March 13, 2019, peacefully at home.
