= Six Stories =

1997 short story collection by Stephen King

- First edition
- Author: Stephen King
- Cover artist: Michael Alpert
- Language: English
- Genre: Horror
- Publisher: Philtrum Press
- Publication date: 1997
- Publication place: United States
- Media type: Print (paperback)
- Pages: 199

Six Stories is a short story collection by Stephen King, published in 1997 by Philtrum Press. It is limited to 1100 copies, which are signed and numbered.

== Contents ==
Six Stories contains:

- "Lunch at the Gotham Cafe" (later published as part of Everything's Eventual, slightly revised)
- "L. T.'s Theory of Pets" (later published as part of Everything's Eventual)
- "Luckey Quarter" (later published as part of Everything's Eventual)
- "Autopsy Room Four" (later published as part of Everything's Eventual)
- "Blind Willie" (later published as part of Hearts in Atlantis, heavily revised)
- "The Man in the Black Suit" (later published as part of Everything's Eventual, slightly revised)

== See also ==
- Short fiction by Stephen King
