= Autopsy Room Four =

Short story by Stephen King

- Short story by Stephen King
- Country: United States
- Language: English
- Genre: Short story

Publication
- Published in: Six Stories
- Publisher: Philtrum Press
- Media type: Magazine (1st release)
- Publication date: Anthology

"Autopsy Room Four" is a short story by American writer Stephen King. It was first published in King's limited-edition collection, Six Stories, in 1997.

== Plot summary ==
The story is set in King's fictional town of Derry, Maine.

Howard Cottrell (Note: A character named Howard Cottrell makes a brief appearance in The Shining, another novel by King, wherein he lends Dick Hallorann a pair of mittens as the latter makes his way to The Overlook Hotel. It is explained that Cottrell has a small amount of "shine", the supernatural ability that allows Danny Torrance and Dick Hallorann to read people's thoughts, among other things. It is not clear if this character is the same person as the character in "Autopsy Room Four".) awakes from some form of unconsciousness to find himself laid out in an autopsy room. As the doctors prepare to begin, Howard struggles to come to grips with what is happening.

After realizing that he is not dead, Howard deduces that he is in a paralysed state. Howard tries to somehow inform the doctors of this fact before they cut into him.

While prepping Cottrell's body, the doctor in charge, Katie Arlen, finds shrapnel wounds around his nether regions. While she is absent-mindedly examining these, an intern rushes into the room to inform them that Howard is still alive. Katie looks down – to find herself holding Howard's erect penis.

In a humorous afternote, Howard explains that he was possibly bitten by a Peruvian Boomslang snake, causing the deathlike paralysis. (Note: There are no boomslangs in the Americas; the species is native to South Africa and the word means "tree snake" in Afrikaans. In his notes at the end, King says he got the name from Agatha Christie: the snake was featured in one of her Miss Marple books. King said that boomslang was just a word he liked, and that he "doubt[ed] like Hell" that a Peruvian one existed.) Another one of the doctors discovered that same snake in his golf bag and was promptly bitten. Howard adds that he and Katie dated for a while, but parted due to an embarrassing issue in the boudoir (he was impotent unless she was wearing rubber gloves).

== Publication ==
The plot of "Autopsy Room Four" is based on the set-up of the short story "Breakdown" by Louis Pollock, originally published in Collier's Magazine in 1947, in which the protagonist is paralyzed in an automobile accident, and must prove that he is alive. At one point in King's story, the protagonist explicitly thinks about a television adaptation of "Breakdown" which aired on Alfred Hitchcock Presents in 1955.

"Autopsy Room Four" was first published in King's limited-edition collection Six Stories in 1997. It appeared in the anthology Robert Bloch's Psychos later the same year. In 2002, it was collected in King's collection Everything's Eventual.

== Reception ==
Stephen J. Spignesi describes the story as "a horrifying literary nightmare about a guy who is mistaken for dead and who is fully aware of the preparations for his own seemingly inevitable autopsy". Publishers Weekly describes it as "a black-humor horror about a man who wakes up paralyzed in a morgue." Ailsa Cox describes the story as "[King's] update of the premature burial theme [...] made horribly vivid, and all too plausible", stating that it "...keeps the ultimate terror at bay by using humour." Cox further describes the story as "...an example of what we might call the tall tale".

== Adaptations ==
- The story was adapted into a short film in 2003.
- The short story was adapted as an episode of the Turner Network Television mini-series Nightmares & Dreamscapes: From the Stories of Stephen King in 2006.
- A feature film adaptation with British director Ranjeet S. Marwa and producer Jon Levin was put in development in 2024.

== See also ==
- Stephen King short fiction bibliography
