= Luckey Quarter =

- Short story by Stephen King
- Country: United States
- Language: English

Publication
- Published in: USA Weekend
- Publisher: Gannett
- Media type: Print
- Publication date: 1995

"Luckey Quarter" is a short story by American writer Stephen King, originally published in USA Weekend in 1995.

== Plot summary ==
Darlene Pullen, who is a struggling single mother with two children (a rebellious teenage daughter and a sickly young son) and an unfulfilling job as a chambermaid at The Rancher's Hotel in Carson City, Nevada, is left a tip of a single quarter with a note saying that it is a "luckey [lucky] quarter". She takes a quick gamble on it and finds that it brings her some small luck. Moving on to a real casino, she keeps trying her luck, and soon she's winning thousands of dollars.

All seems to be going exceedingly well until she suddenly reappears back in the hotel room, left with nothing but her lucky quarter. All of her success was a fantasy. As her two children come to visit her at work, she lets her son have the quarter, and as he uses it in a gamble, it starts to pay off just as it did when Darlene was fantasizing.

== Publication ==
"Luckey Quarter" was originally published in the June 30/July 2, 1995 issue of USA Weekend. In 1997, it was published in King's limited edition collection Six Stories. In 2002, it was collected in King's book Everything's Eventual.

== Adaptations ==
In 2005, "Luckey Quarter" was adapted into a short film produced and directed by Robert Cochrane. In 2023, Luckey Quarter was adapted into a short animated film produced by L.E. Peralta and S. Peralta, written, animated and directed by L.E. Peralta.

== See also ==
- Stephen King short fiction bibliography
