= That Feeling, You Can Only Say What It Is in French =

- Short story by Stephen King
- Country: United States
- Language: English
- Genre: Horror

Publication
- Published in: The New Yorker
- Publication type: Magazine
- Publication date: 1998

"That Feeling, You Can Only Say What It Is in French" is a 1998 horror short story by American writer Stephen King, originally published in The New Yorker and collected King's book Everything's Eventual in 2002.

== Plot summary ==
As the story progresses, a woman (Carol) begins to have déjà vu of the same car ride on their second honeymoon with the same bloody outcome every time. It never ends. It is implied, but never said, that they have crashed on the plane to their honeymoon location and they may be in Hell or Purgatory. In his closing remarks, King suggested that Hell is not "other people," as Sartre claimed, but repetition, enduring the same pain over and over again without end.

== Publication ==
"That Feeling, You Can Only Say What It Is in French" was originally published in the June 22, 1998 issue of The New Yorker. In 2002, it was collected in King's collection Everything's Eventual. It has since been anthologised on several occasions.

== Adaptations ==
This story has been adapted on several occasions as part of King's Dollar Baby program.

One adaptation, titled "That Feeling" by writer/director/editor Paul Inman, was completed in 2021 and debuted in film festivals in 2022. There it won several awards including, Best Director, Best Actress, Best Actor, Best Score, and Best International Short Film. It was also an official selection at the "Stephen King Rules Film Festival" in Davenport, Iowa, where many of the Dollar Baby films were presented online with Stephen King's blessing for the first time.

== See also ==
- Stephen King short fiction bibliography
