= Everything's Eventual (novella) =

Novella by Stephen King

- Author: Stephen King
- Language: English
- Series: Fantasy
- Published in: Magazine of Fantasy & Science Fiction
- Publisher: Mercury Press
- Publication date: 1997
- Publication place: United States
- Media type: Periodical

Everything's Eventual is a fantasy novella by American writer Stephen King. It was originally published in the October/November 1997 issue of The Magazine of Fantasy & Science Fiction. In 2000, it was included in the game Stephen King's F13, and in 2002, in King's collection of the same name.

== Plot summary ==
Richard "Dinky" Earnshaw, a 19-year-old high-school dropout, explains that he has got a good job where he gets his own house, car, and virtually anything he asks for — including CDs which have not been released yet. He also receives a small weekly cash allowance, provided he does not look for the people who drop it through his mail slot and that he gets rid of any money left over at the end of the week; he dumps his excess change into the gutter by his house and he puts his bills in the garbage disposal.

It is revealed that Dinky has the ability to mentally influence people by drawing complicated designs or pictures, in a way which he does not completely understand. This is illustrated when he recalls that, as a child, when a dog tormented him on his way home from school, he (semi-knowingly) drove it to suicide. At Dinky's previous job at a grocery store, he was forced to endure humiliating treatment by another employee named Skipper, until the day Dinky used his power to make Skipper kill himself.

Dinky is discovered by a man named Mr. Sharpton, who claims to work for the Trans Corporation, an organization that searches across the world for people with such talents. Dinky is recruited to kill very specific targets by e-mailing them his designs that he creates on an Apple computer. He is, in return, given a life that seems ideal, complete with a house and other benefits. Mr. Sharpton tells Dinky that the people he is ordered to kill are wicked, horrible criminals, and the world is better off without them.

For a time, Dinky lives his new life in a semi-mindless bliss. However, when he finds an article in the newspaper about one of the individuals whom he has killed (a seemingly innocent old newspaper columnist) he begins to feel guilty for what he has done. After researching more into his other victims, Dinky realizes that the organization has been using him to assassinate political dissidents and alternative thinkers. As the story ends, Dinky plans his escape, but not before sending one final email to Mr. Sharpton, his recruiter, with an undistinguished symbol attached.

== Inspiration ==
King states in the foreword for this short story that the idea came from a dream about a person pouring change into the storm drain.

Dinky is a "Breaker", like Ted Brautigan in the novella "Low Men in Yellow Coats", which connects Dinky's story to The Dark Tower universe. They appeared together as minor characters in the final novel of The Dark Tower series.

== Adaptations ==
In 2009, director and producer J. P. Scott made the first full-length Dollar Baby film based on the novella.

== See also ==
- Stephen King short fiction bibliography
