= Riding the Bullet =

2000 novella by Stephen King

- Cover of the original e-book release
- Author: Stephen King
- Language: English
- Genre: Horror
- Published in: Everything's Eventual
- Publication date: March 14, 2000
- Publication place: United States
- Media type: e-book, print (hardcover)

Riding the Bullet is a horror novella by American writer Stephen King. It marked King's debut on the Internet. Simon & Schuster, with technology by SoftLock, first published Riding the Bullet in 2000 as the world's first mass-market e-book, available for download at $2.50. That year, the novella was nominated for the Bram Stoker Award for Superior Achievement in Long Fiction and the International Horror Guild Award for Best Long Form. In 2002, the novella was included in King's collection Everything's Eventual.

== Publication ==
During the first 24 hours, over 400,000 copies of Riding the Bullet were downloaded, jamming SoftLock's server. Some Stephen King fans waited hours for the download.

With over 500,000 downloads, Stephen King seemed to pave the way for the future of publishing. The actual number of readers was unclear because the encryption caused countless computers to crash.

The total financial gross of the electronic publication remains uncertain. Initially offered at $2.50 by SoftLock and then Simon & Schuster, it was later available free for download from Amazon and Barnes & Noble.

In 2009, Lonely Road Books announced the impending release of Riding the Bullet: The Deluxe Special Edition Double, by Stephen King and Mick Garris, as an oversized slipcased hardcover bound in the flip book or tête-bêche format (like an Ace Double) featuring the novella Riding the Bullet, the original script for the eponymous 2004 film by Mick Garris, and artwork by Alan M. Clark and Bernie Wrightson. The book was available in three editions:

- Collector's Gift Edition: limited to 3000 slipcased copies (not signed)
- Limited Edition of 500 copies (signed by Mick Garris and the artist)
- Lettered Edition of 52 copies (signed by Stephen King)

== Plot summary ==
Alan Parker is a student at the University of Maine who is trying to find himself. He gets a call from a neighbor in his hometown of Lewiston, telling him that his mother has been taken to the hospital after having a stroke. Lacking a functioning car, Parker decides to hitchhike the 120 miles (200 km) south to visit his mother.

He ends up riding with an old man who continually tugs at his crotch in a car that stinks of urine. Eventually frightened and glad to escape the vehicle, Alan starts walking, hitchhiking his next ride. Coming upon a graveyard, he begins to explore it and notices a headstone for a stranger named George Staub, which reads: "Well Begun, Too Soon Done". Sure enough, the next car to pick him up is driven by George Staub, complete with black stitches around his neck where his head had been sewn on after being severed and wearing a button saying, "I Rode The Bullet At Thrill Village, Laconia."

During the ride, George talks to Alan about the amusement park ride he was too scared to ride as a kid: The Bullet in Thrill Village, Laconia, New Hampshire. George tells Alan that before they reach the lights of town, Alan must choose who goes on the death ride with George: Alan or his mother. In a moment of fright, Alan saves himself and tells him: "Take her. Take my mother."

George shoves Alan out of the car. Alan reappears alone at the graveyard, wearing the "I Rode the Bullet at Thrill Village" button. He eventually reaches the hospital, where he learns that despite his guilt and the impending feeling that his mother is dead or will die any moment, she is fine.

Alan takes the button and treasures it as a good (or bad) luck charm. His mother returns to work. Alan graduates and takes care of his mother for several years, and she suffers another stroke.

One day, Alan loses the button and receives a phone call; he knows what the call is about. He finds the button underneath his mother's bed and, after a final moment of sadness, guilt, and meditation, decides to carry on. His mother's "ride" is over.

== Film ==
A movie adaptation of the story, starring Jonathan Jackson, Barbara Hershey and David Arquette, was released in 2004.

== Reception ==
F&SF (The Magazine of Fantasy & Science Fiction) reviewer Charles de Lint praised the novella as "a terrific story, highlighting King's gift for characterization and his sheer narrative drive."

In contrast, The New York Times' Christopher Lehmann-Haupt, who read the book in both available online formats (computer download and an e-book supplied by the publisher, neither of which permitted a user to print out a copy), was more critical. He disliked reading digital content on a backlit monitor ("I was also restlessly aware of the unusual effort it was taking to read onscreen") and the book's content ("after getting off to such a strong start, Mr. King writes himself into a corner that makes Alan's scary adventure seem something of a shaggy dog story"). He concluded: "reading 'Riding the Bullet,' I sorely missed the solidity of good old print on paper. And who knows, maybe old-fashioned print would have made Mr. King's story seem a little more substantial?"

== See also ==
- Stephen King short fiction bibliography
