= The Green Mile (novel) =

Serial novel by Stephen King

- Cover of the first volume in the series, released March 28, 1996
- Author: Stephen King
- Language: English
- Genre: Dark fantasy, Southern Gothic, magic realism
- Publisher: Signet Books
- Publication date: March 28 – August 29, 1996 (serial); May 5, 1997 (single)
- Publication place: United States
- Media type: Print (paperback)
- Pages: 400 pp

The Green Mile is a 1996 serial novel by American writer Stephen King. It tells the story of death row supervisor Paul Edgecombe's encounter with John Coffey, an unusual inmate who displays inexplicable healing and empathetic abilities. The serial novel was released in six volumes before being republished as a single-volume work. The book is an example of magical realism. The subsequent film adaptation was a critical and commercial success. The Green Mile won the Bram Stoker Award for Best Novel in 1996. In 1997, The Green Mile was nominated as Best Novel for the British Fantasy Award and the Locus Award. In 2003 the book was listed on the BBC's The Big Read poll of the UK's "best-loved novel".

== Plot ==
Featuring a first-person narrative told by Paul Edgecombe, the novel switches between Paul as an old man in the Georgia Pines nursing home writing down his story in 1996, and his time in 1932 as the block supervisor of the Cold Mountain Penitentiary death row, nicknamed "The Green Mile" for the color of the floor's linoleum. This year marks the arrival of John Coffey, a 6 ft 8 in (2.03 m) tall powerfully built black man who has been convicted of raping and murdering two young white girls. During his time on the Mile, John interacts with fellow prisoners Eduard "Del" Delacroix, a Cajun arsonist, rapist, and murderer; and William "Wild Bill" Wharton, an unhinged and dangerous multiple murderer who is determined to make as much trouble as he can before he is executed. Other inhabitants include Arlen Bitterbuck, a Native American convicted of killing a man in a fight over a pair of boots, Arthur Flanders, a real estate executive who killed his father to perpetrate insurance fraud; and Mr. Jingles, a mouse Del teaches various tricks.

Paul and the other guards are irritated throughout the book by Percy Wetmore, a sadistic guard who enjoys antagonizing the prisoners. The other guards have to be civil to him despite their dislike of him because he is the nephew of the Governor's wife. When Percy is offered a higher paying job, an administrative position at the nearby Briar Ridge psychiatric hospital, Paul thinks they are finally rid of him. However, Percy refuses to leave until he is allowed to supervise an execution, so Paul hesitantly allows him to run Del's. Percy deliberately avoids soaking a sponge in brine that is supposed to be tucked inside the electrode cap to ensure a quick death in the electric chair. When the switch is thrown, the current causes Del to catch fire in the chair and suffer a prolonged, agonizing demise.

Over time, Paul realizes that John Coffey possesses inexplicable healing abilities through touch, which he uses to cure Paul's urinary tract infection and revive Mr. Jingles after Percy stomps on him. Simple-minded and shy, John is very empathic and sensitive to the thoughts and feelings of others around him. One night, the guards drug Wharton, then put a straitjacket on Percy and lock him in the padded restraint room so that they can smuggle John out of prison and take him to the home of Warden Hal Moores. Hal's wife Melinda has an inoperable brain tumor, which John cures by drawing the disease out through his hands and into his body, causing him terrible pain. When they return to the Mile, John discharges the disease from Melinda into Percy, causing him to go mad and shoot Wharton to death before falling into a catatonic state from which he never recovers. Percy is then committed to Briar Ridge as a patient.

Paul's long-simmering suspicions that John is innocent are proven right when he discovers that it was actually Wharton who raped and killed the two girls and that John was trying to revive them. Later, John tells Paul he had touched Wharton and saw how he coerced the sisters to be silent by threatening to kill one if the other made a noise, using their love for each other. Paul is unsure how to help John, but John tells him not to worry, as he is ready to die anyway, wanting to escape the cruelty of the world. John's execution is the last one in which Paul participates.

As Paul approaches the conclusion of his written story, he offers it to his friend Elaine to read. After she finishes, he introduces Mr. Jingles to her just before the mouse dies – it had been alive the past 64 years. Paul explains that those healed by John gained an unnaturally long lifespan. Elaine dies shortly after, never learning that, on the day of his wife's death, Paul saw the ghost of John Coffey. The novel ends with Paul all alone, now 104 years old, wondering how much longer he will live.

== Characters ==
=== Main characters ===
Paul Edgecombe
The protagonist and narrator of the book and the death row supervisor at Cold Mountain Penitentiary. He is 40 years old when the bulk of the story takes place, in 1932. He is a caring man and takes excellent care of the men on his block, avoiding conflict and keeping the peace whenever possible. He is the first character to discover John Coffey's amazing abilities, when the prisoner cures his urinary tract infection. It is also his idea to take Coffey to try to cure Melinda, Warden Hal Moores' wife, of her brain tumor. He transferred to Boy's Correctional with Brutus Howell shortly after Coffey's execution, and he is still alive at age 104 as of 1996, when he decides to write down John Coffey's story, possibly to publicly reveal the latter's innocence.
Brutus "Brutal" Howell
He is second in command on the Green Mile and Paul's best friend. He is a tall, imposing man but not violent at all unless necessary. His nickname of "Brutal" is intended as irony, as he is normally calm and soft-spoken. A former football tackle who had gone on to play at Louisiana State University (LSU) in his youth, he eventually suffers a fatal heart attack at home, presumably in his late fifties, about twenty-five years after Coffey's execution.
John Coffey
He is an African American with a massive build (6 ft 8 in tall), having been convicted of the rape and murder of two young girls and sentenced to death. He is very quiet and prefers to keep to himself, weeps almost constantly, and is afraid of the dark. Even at the end, during his execution, he asks Paul Edgecombe not to put on the traditional black silk mask used to block the view of the prisoner's face because he fears the dark. Coffey is described as "knowing his own name and not much else" and lacks the capability to do so much as tie a simple knot. At his trial, though, the prosecution contends he lured the girls away from their home, disposed of the watchdog, and carefully planned the crime using abilities Paul believes to be far beyond his reach. He is the calmest and mildest prisoner the guards have ever seen, despite his hulking form. He turns out to be innocent of the rape and murder of the two girls, but allows himself to be executed regardless because he is tired of all the cruelty in the world.
Percy Wetmore
The secondary antagonist of the story. He is a young and sadistic guard. He is disliked by Paul and the other guards because of his cruelty, but they can't do anything about it because he is the nephew of the state governor's wife. He is very homophobic and attacks Eduard Delacroix for allegedly touching him, although it was an accident caused by Del stumbling out of the prison truck. He is later attacked by "Wild Bill" Wharton, consequently wets himself, and is teased by Delacroix for it. In retaliation, Percy deliberately sabotages Delacroix's execution. John transferred Melinda's sickness into Percy, causing him to kill Wild Bill in a catatonic state. Percy never recovers and he was therefore sent to the Briar Ridge Mental Hospital. He later lived through a fire at Briar Ridge and died in 1965 at another mental asylum.
William "Wild Bill" Wharton
The main antagonist of the story. He is on death row for various crimes, including an armed robbery in which he killed a pregnant woman and two other innocent bystanders. He does not like the nickname "Wild Bill" but prefers to be called "Billy the Kid", a name he has tattooed on his forearm. When he first arrives he manages to convince the guards he is in a drugged stupor, only to attack and attempt to strangle to death Dean Stanton when they reach E Block. He continues to wreak havoc on the Mile and plays tricks such as urinating on the guards and spitting a chewed-up Moon Pie into Brutal's face. He is punished by being placed in solitary confinement countless times, but never learns his lesson. As John Coffey is being smuggled to Hal Moores's house, Wild Bill grabs his arm and Coffey sees that he actually committed the crimes for which Coffey was convicted. Therefore, Coffey gives Percy the "sickness" he took from the warden's wife, indirectly killing Wild Bill.
Eduard "Del" Delacroix
He is a Cajun prisoner with a fairly slow grasp of the English language, and has no family. He raped and murdered a young girl before starting a fire, which caused the deaths of six more people (including two children), resulting in his being sent to death row. While on the Mile, Del befriends a mouse named Mr. Jingles, who becomes his best friend in his last days on death row. Percy, his enemy, sabotages his execution, causing Del to die a slow and gruesome death in the electric chair.
Mr. Jingles / Steamboat Willie
Called Steamboat Willie by Brutal, he is an unusually intelligent mouse. He becomes a friend to Eduard Delacroix, who renames him Mr. Jingles in the few days before the man is executed. He is healed by John Coffey after being stomped on by Percy Wetmore. This gives him increased longevity and he finally dies 64 years later.

=== Minor characters ===
Arthur "The President" Flanders
An inmate on death row, convicted of killing his father in an insurance fraud scheme. His sentence is commuted to life imprisonment, but he is later murdered by another inmate 12 years after Coffey was put to death.
Arlen "The Chief" Bitterbuck
A Washita Cherokee death row inmate, convicted of killing a man in a drunken brawl over a pair of boots. His execution is the first of three mentioned in Paul's story.
Janice Edgecombe
Paul Edgecombe's wife. Dies at the age of 59 in a bus accident on the way to her grandchild's graduation in 1956.
Hal Moores
The warden at Cold Mountain Penitentiary. After Coffey cured his wife, he somehow suspected the truth of Coffey's supposed guilt of the double murder he was convicted of. Hal died from a stroke around the same time as the Japanese attack on Pearl Harbor.
Melinda Moores
Warden Moores's wife, who is dying of a brain tumor and is cured by John Coffey. She dies of a heart attack ten years later.
Curtis Anderson
The assistant warden.
Dean Stanton
A guard on E Block who is strangled and nearly killed by William Wharton. A father of young children, Paul ensures he takes no part in the taking of John Coffey to Melinda Moores due to the risk of losing his job. He applies for relocation to C Block after John Coffey's death, where he is murdered by an inmate four months later.
Harry Terwilliger
One of the main guards on E Block along with his friends Paul Edgecombe, Brutus Howell and Dean Stanton. He eventually dies of cancer in 1982, 50 years after John Coffey's execution.
Bill Dodge
A "floater" guard on E Block (not permanently assigned there).
Jack Van Hay
A guard who is part of the execution team. He operates the switch room.
Toot-Toot
A trustee who stands in for the condemned during execution rehearsals and sells snacks to prisoners and guards.
Burt Hammersmith
A reporter who wrote on the Detterick twins' murders and John Coffey's trial. Despite believing himself to be an "Enlightenment" man, he displays prejudice in his stance on "Negroes" and tries to convince Paul of John Coffey's guilt.
Elaine Connelly
A friend of Paul in the present-day nursing home where he tells his story. She is later revealed to be the grandmother of the Speaker of the Georgia House of Representatives and uses her influence to prevent Brad Dolan from harassing Paul. She dies from a heart attack three months after hearing Paul's story about John Coffey.
Homer Cribus
The Sheriff of Trapingus County, where the murders of the Detterick twins took place. Despite playing no part in apprehending John Coffey, he later shows up at the execution. An outspoken Baptist with strong racial prejudice and immensely overweight, he later succumbs to a heart attack while having sex with a 17-year-old African American in his office.
Rob McGee
The Deputy Sheriff of Trapingus County, who led the search party that found John Coffey. While displaying strong doubt about Coffey's guilt after being shown signs of innocence by Paul Edgecombe, he is still powerless to call for an appeal as he is subordinate to Sheriff Cribus, whom he allegedly hopes to succeed.
Brad Dolan
A malicious nursing home employee who harasses Paul Edgecombe. Paul strongly compares him to Percy Wetmore, and several times mistakes him for Percy, despite the latter having died in 1965.
Kathe and Cora Detterick
The two young girls whom John Coffey was convicted of raping and murdering, though the crime was actually committed by William Wharton.
Klaus and Marjorie Detterick
The parents of Kathe and Cora. Marjorie was killed in a car accident 18 years after John Coffey's execution while Klaus died from a stroke in March 1933 shortly after John Coffey's execution.
Howie Detterick
Klaus and Marjorie's son and Kathe and Cora's brother who goes with his dad to find the twins after they were taken.

== Film adaptation ==
Frank Darabont adapted the novel into a screenplay for a feature film of the same name. Released in 1999, the film was directed by Darabont and stars Tom Hanks as Paul Edgecombe and Michael Clarke Duncan as John Coffey. The setting is changed from 1932 to 1935 in order to include the film Top Hat, which does not appear in the book. The film was nominated for four Academy Awards, including Best Picture and Best Supporting Actor for Duncan.

== Publication history ==
The Green Mile was first published in six paperback volumes. The first, subtitled The Two Dead Girls was published on March 28, 1996, with new volumes following monthly until the final volume, Coffey on the Mile, was released on August 29, 1996. The novel was republished as a single paperback volume on May 5, 1997. On October 3, 2000, the book was published in its first hardcover edition (ISBN 978-0743210898). In 2007, Subterranean Press released a 10th anniversary edition of the novel in three different versions, each mimicking the original six-volume release: the Gift Edition, limited to 2,000 copies, containing six unsigned hardcover volumes of each separate part, housed in a slipcase; the Limited Edition, limited to 148 numbered copies, and signed by Stephen King, housed in a slipcase; and the Lettered Edition, limited to 52 lettered copies, and signed by Stephen King, housed in a traycase. Every edition contained new illustrations by Mark Geyer, the novel's original illustrator. Each version had its own design, and cost $150, $900, and $2,500, respectively. There were other versions published as well, including a "pocketbook" sized hardcover by Paw Prints (ISBN 9781439182789).

King was first made aware of the possibility to publish stories in shorter installments by Ralph Vicinanza, who, after a conversation with British publisher Malcolm Edwards, learned that Charles Dickens had often published his stories in shorter installments by either folding them into magazines, or by publishing the installments on their own as a chapbook. After a lengthy struggle to write the novel, Vicinaza pitched the idea of writing the book "the same way it would be read - in installments" to King the year before the initial release of the first installment. The idea of serialized publication appealed to King on multiple levels; from the writer's responsibility to finish the story once the first installment is published, to the readers' inability to skip to the end of the story and ruin the suspense. In the introduction to the first collected edition of the story, King also explains the financial aspect of initially publishing the book in six installments:

The part-by-part publication was a sore point with me and some readers as well, because the price was very high for a paperback; about nineteen dollars for all six installments (considerably less if bought at a discount store). For that reason a boxed set never seems like the ideal solution. This volume, a trade paperback available at a more sane price, seemed to be the ideal solution.

— Stephen King, Bangor, Maine. February 6, 1997

=== Volume list ===
Title	Date	Length	ISBN
The Two Dead Girls	March 28, 1996	66 pp	978-0451190499
The Mouse on the Mile	April 25, 1996	66 pp	978-0451190529
Coffey's Hands	May 30, 1996	66 pp	978-0451190543
The Bad Death of Eduard Delacroix	June 27, 1996	66 pp	978-0451190550
Night Journey	July 25, 1996	66 pp	978-0451190567
Coffey on the Mile	August 29, 1996	70 pp	978-0451190574
