= The Man in the Black Suit =

- Short story by Stephen King
- Country: United States
- Language: English
- Genre: Horror

Publication
- Published in: The New Yorker
- Publication type: Magazine
- Publisher: Condé Nast
- Media type: Print
- Publication date: October 31, 1994

"The Man in the Black Suit" is a horror short story by American writer Stephen King. It was originally published in the October 31, 1994 issue of The New Yorker magazine.

In 1995, it won the World Fantasy Award and the O. Henry Award for Best Short Fiction.

In 1997, it was published in the limited-edition collection Six Stories.

In 2002, it was included in King's collection Everything's Eventual. King described the piece as an homage to Nathaniel Hawthorne's story "Young Goodman Brown". He also states that the story evolved from one his friend told him, in which the friend's grandfather had come face to face with Satan himself in the form of an ordinary man. It was adapted into a short film, with the same title, in 2004 by Nicholas Mariani.

== Plot summary ==
Set in the fictional town of Motton, Maine, "The Man in the Black Suit" recounts the tale of Gary, a nine-year-old boy, whose brother has recently died from an allergic reaction to a bee sting. One day, Gary goes out fishing and falls asleep by a creek. He awakens to find a bee sitting on the tip of his nose. Not knowing if he shares his brother's allergy to them, he is frozen by terror until he hears a clap behind him, which causes the bee to drop dead. Turning around, Gary discovers a tall, pale man in a three-piece black suit looming over him. He engages Gary in what at first seems like normal conversation, but Gary notices the man has shark-like teeth, long, claw-like fingernails, and burning eyes.

The man then tells Gary terrible things: that his mother has died (also from a bee sting) while he was away, and that his father intends to rape him. In order to save him from "all that unpleasantness", he (the man) tells Gary he will kill and eat him. At first, Gary doesn't believe him. However, he soon realizes that the man is actually the devil. In order to dissuade him, Gary offers him a fish he caught. The man swallows it whole, but declaring he is not satisfied, attacks Gary. Gary flees, with the man pursuing him to the outskirts of the forest.

Gary believes the man's claim until returning home and seeing his mother in the kitchen. Gary's father persuades him to return with him to the spot in the forest to retrieve his fishing equipment. When they arrive at the spot where Gary met the man in the black suit, Gary's father notices the grass is black and foul-smelling where the man was sitting. While dubious of Gary's story about the man in the black suit, his father tells him not to return there.

The story is narrated by Gary, looking back from his perspective as an elderly man. He is haunted by his belief that he only escaped from the devil by sheer luck, and lives in terror of his approaching death and the possibility of a second encounter with the man in the black suit. Gary knows that he won't be able to outwit him or outrun him in his old age.

== Short film adaptation ==
The book was adapted into a short film in 2004, with John Viener in the titular role.

== See also ==
- Stephen King short fiction bibliography
