= The Eyes of the Dragon =

Novel by Stephen King

- First edition cover
- Author: Stephen King
- Language: English
- Genre: Fantasy
- Publisher: Viking
- Publication date: fall 1984
- Publication place: United States
- Media type: Print (Hardcover)
- Pages: 326
- ISBN: 978-0-670-81458-9

The Eyes of the Dragon is a fantasy novel by American writer Stephen King, first published as a limited edition slipcased hardcover by Philtrum Press in 1984, illustrated by Kenneth R. Linkhauser. The novel would later be published for the mass market by Viking in 1987, with illustrations by David Palladini. This trade edition was slightly revised for publication. The 1995 French edition did not reproduce the American illustrations; it included brand new illustrations by Christian Heinrich, and a 2016 new French version also included brand new illustrations, by Nicolas Duffaut.

== Background ==
At the time of publication, this type of novel was a deviation from the norm for King, who was best known for his horror fiction. His daughter Naomi didn't read her father's books because she didn't like horror. When she was a teenager, he asked her what she did like, and she told him she liked dragons. So he wrote a fantasy novel, and dedicated it to her. The book is a work of epic fantasy in a quasi-medieval setting, with a clearly established battle between good and evil, and magic playing a lead role. The Eyes of the Dragon was originally titled Napkins.

== Plot ==
Title page from the original 1984 Philtrum Press edition (book issued without cover)

The Eyes of the Dragon takes place within the realm of Delain. It is told from the perspective of an unnamed storyteller/narrator, who speaks casually and frankly to the reader, frequently adding his own commentary on characters' motivations and the like.

King Roland's magician, Flagg, seeking to destroy the Kingdom of Delain, sees his plans being ruined by the good-hearted Queen Sasha. After Sasha gives birth to Peter, a noble and worthy future king, Flagg realizes that his position, his plans, and his life may be in danger because of Peter. While Sasha is pregnant with a second son, Flagg seizes the opportunity. He forces the Queen's midwife to ensure that Sasha bleeds to death while giving birth to her second son, Thomas. Sasha dies and Flagg begins plotting to remove Peter.

As both boys grow into adolescence, Peter becomes established as his father's favorite, and Thomas becomes increasingly jealous of him. Flagg sees this and befriends Thomas, showing him the secrets of the castle. He teaches him how to spy on his father from a secret hiding-place behind a mounted dragon head in Roland's study. Peter begins the custom of bringing a glass of wine to his father before bed each night. Flagg decides to use this as a means of framing Peter. He dissolves a poison called Dragon Sand in a glass of wine and delivers it to the king. Unbeknownst to Flagg, Thomas watches this through the glass eyes of the dragon. Roland dies in terrible agony, and Flagg plants evidence incriminating Peter.

After a brief trial, Peter is declared guilty, and is locked up in a high tower called the Needle in the center of the city. Thomas is then crowned King, although he is only twelve years old; due to his youth and his fearful inexperience, he allows Flagg enormous amounts of power. At the start of his long stay in the Needle, Peter manages to send a note to the judge who convicted him, Anders Peyna, with the seemingly innocuous requests to have his mother's old dollhouse with him, and also to have napkins brought with his meals. Peyna is puzzled by the requests, but, seeing no harm in them, grants them. Five years later, Peter escapes from the Needle, having used the toy loom in the dollhouse and threads from the napkins to make a rope. After the escape, he and his allies try to find King Roland's bow and arrow, which is now in Thomas' possession. Flagg, now revealed as a demonic being, is about to kill them when Thomas arrives and reveals how he watched Flagg poison Roland. Thomas shoots Flagg in the eye, but Flagg uses magic to disappear and escape. At the end of the novel, Peter is declared to be the rightful king. Thomas, who has become deeply hated in Delain, sets off alongside his butler, Dennis, to find Flagg. They find him and confront him, but the narrator does not reveal the outcome.

== Characters ==
Flagg (pictured right) with King Peter from The Eyes of the Dragon. Art by David Palladini

=== House Delain ===
- King Roland the Good – Delain's ruler as the novel opens. In his younger and more virile days, Roland was renowned for slaying Niner the Dragon with Foe-Hammer, a great hunting-arrow forged by his mother, Queen Lita. Over the years since then, Roland has become somewhat infirm and addled. He trusts Flagg, his counselor, little realizing the ill will that Flagg harbors toward him. However, early in the story, he does favor his wife's advice more than Flagg's. Roland is the husband of Queen Sasha; their sons are Peter and Thomas.
- Queen Sasha – Roland's wife; mother of Peter and Thomas. Sasha was chosen for Roland because she was an innocent girl from a lesser noble family; she is also seemingly the shyest of those whom Flagg had selected for Roland. Flagg believed Sasha would pose the least long-term threat to his authority; Roland, for his part, chose her since she seemed the least frightening to him. Yet Sasha revealed herself to be a strong and independent woman, who truly loved - and was truly loved in return by - both Roland and the kingdom. She was murdered under Flagg's orders while giving birth to Thomas. Her cousin is Squire Andrew Staad.
- Prince Peter – Roland's elder son, heir to the throne of Delain. Peter is a tall, lithe, handsome young man who has inherited his mother's good looks and his father's love of the common man. He is openly favored among the people of Delain to be their next King. Peter rides a horse named Peony.
- Prince Thomas – Roland's younger son. Thomas takes after Roland, being slow and heavy even in childhood. He feels overshadowed by Peter and resents his elder brother because Roland clearly loves Peter more. Yet Thomas, like their father, is a talented archer; in this he can outstrip even Peter. As Thomas gets older, Flagg becomes his only friend and sole source of comfort. Crowned "Thomas the Light-Bringer," he soon receives the nickname "Thomas the Tax-Bringer;" this is to the merciless 80% tax increase he imposed upon the people of Delain at Flagg's urging.
- Queen Lita – granddaughter of Queen Kyla the Good; daughter of King Landry; mother of King Roland the Good; grandmother of Princes Thomas and Peter. She forged the great hunting-arrow known as Foe-Hammer.
- King Alan II (aka Alan the Mad, mentioned only) – uncle of Queen Kyla the Good; grandfather of King Landry. Alan's legendarily-beautiful cousin Eleanor married Duke Leven Valera of the South Barony (aka the Black Duke).
- Queen Kyla the Good (mentioned only) – niece of King Alan the Mad; mother of King Landry; grandmother of Queen Lita.
- King Landry (mentioned only) – grandson of King Alan the Mad; son of Queen Kyla the Good; father of Queen Lita; grandfather of King Roland the Good

=== House Reechul ===
- Charles Reechul – Naomi's father.
- Naomi Reechul – the eldest daughter of farmer Charles Reechul. This peasant girl ultimately joins up with the Exiles, a developing resistance group. She and her dog Frisky help Ben Staad (whom she later marries) to locate Dennis.

=== House Staad ===
- Squire Andrew Staad – cousin of Queen Sasha; husband of Susan; father of Ben and Emmaline.
- Susan Staad – wife of Squire Andrew; their offspring are Ben and Emmaline.
- Ben Staad – Peter's cousin and closest friend, although the Staad family is considered Delain's most unfortunate. Ben is strong, handsome, and loyal. He eventually marries Naomi Reechul.
- Emmaline Staad – Ben's younger sister.

=== Other characters ===
- Prince Ailon – mythological ruler of the Moon; he drives his lunar chariot across the sky every night.
- Aron Beson – Chief Warder of the Needle.
- Browson – Another alias of Flagg from long ago.
- Anna Crookbrows – Queen Sasha's midwife, and a pawn in her assassination. Her only son was twenty when he contracted Shaking Disease (“the Shakes”, for short). Flagg cured him in exchange for her killing Queen Sasha.
- Dennis – Peter's butler. He, his father Brandon, and their family have served the royals of Delain for centuries; Dennis takes great pride in his work. He is complicit in Peter's imprisonment; Dennis found the poison, which killed King Roland, inside Peter's room. He acted as Thomas's butler upon Roland's death, and later aided Peter's escape. Ultimately, Dennis goes with Thomas on his quest to find Flagg.
- Quentin Ellender – Delain's greatest craftsman.
- Flagg from the land of Garlan (aka Flagg the Hooded) – the Royal Adviser to King Roland. Flagg, a powerful wizard, has been around for centuries. He has served as a counselor to at least four successive monarchs: Roland's grandparents and parents, Roland himself, and Thomas. Though Flagg has lived in Delain for roughly seventy years, he has only appeared to age ten. Later in the story, it is revealed that Flagg has appeared in Delain multiple times, under multiple guises;the oldest-known of which took place over five hundred years in the past. His ultimate goal is to overthrow Delain's monarchy and to plunge the kingdom into "a thousand years of bloody anarchy, give or take a few months". (In The Stand, Randall Flagg was the personification of evil; Flagg plays a part in The Dark Tower novels as well. The character is almost definitely the same Flagg as in The Dark Tower, The Stand, and many other works of Stephen King.)
- Galen – Goshawk (a rank indicated to be equal to a Corporal) of Delain's Home Guard.
- Bill Hinch – once served as Lord High Executioner, he was one of Flagg's personas during a previous stay in Delain (and is now a folk tale to strike fear in naughty children).
- Lord-Chancellor Anders Peyna – The Kingdom's Judge-General, who presides over the Royal Court of Delain. The people are far more afraid of Peyna than they are of the King. Peyna condemns Peter to his imprisonment, but is later convinced of the prince's innocence. Along with Ben Staad and Dennis, he helps engineer Peter's escape from the Needle (albeit unwittingly) by raising the jailhouse bribe which allows Peter to have the dollhouse and napkins. Peyna is served by his butler Arlen.
- Rhiannon – Dark Witch of the Coos.
- Splitfoot – The Devil.
- Lord Towson
- Ulrich Wicks – one of the ten Great Lawyers of Delain.
- Yosef – serves King Roland as head groom.

== Reception ==
The Eyes of the Dragon was warmly received by professional critics. Barbara Tritel of The New York Times described The Eyes of the Dragon as drawing clear influence from European fairy tales and wrote that the novel was "more elegant than any other novel Mr. King has written so far." Some of King's established fans rejected the novel, considering it a children's book – King originally wrote the novel for his children. Another reason for fan rejection of The Eyes of the Dragon was that it was epic fantasy, with little to no elements of the horror that typified King's most successful work of this era. Negative fan reaction to The Eyes of the Dragon was an inspiration for King's subsequent novel Misery. The protagonist of Misery was a successful romance novelist who killed off his most popular character to allow himself to write in other styles of fiction, only to be imprisoned by an angry, deranged fan; King saw Misery as a metaphor for being chained to writing horror fiction.

== Adaptations ==
=== Film ===
Initially The Eyes of the Dragon was to be created as an animated film produced through the French company WAMC Entertainment. The film would have a budget of $45 million and was expected to release in late 2001 or early 2002. However the film did not progress into active production and the rights lapsed in 2000.

=== Television adaptation ===
In 2012 Syfy announced that it was developing several projects for potential television adaptations, one of which was The Eyes of the Dragon. If successfully developed, the book would be made into either a movie or miniseries. Michael Taylor and Jeff Vintar were confirmed to be penning the script and Taylor and Bill Haber would act as executive producers.

In 2019 news broke that Hulu was adapting the book as a television series. In September 2020, Seth Grahame-Smith, a producer and screenwriter for the Hulu adaptation, appeared on The Kingcast podcast with news that Hulu decided to cancel the project due to budgetary concerns and changes to the Hulu's executive team.
