= Philtrum Press =

American publisher

- Founder: Stephen King
- Country of origin: United States
- Headquarters location: Bangor, Maine
- Publication types: Books

Philtrum Press is a small publishing house run by Stephen King. This small press operation, operating out of King's front business offices in Bangor, Maine, is primarily run by King's personal assistant, Marsha DeFillipo (who is also the moderator of the Stephen King Website Message Board).

At least the following have been published:

- The Plant, part 1 (1982), serialized, epistolary novel written by Stephen King
- The Plant, part 2 (1983)
- The Eyes of the Dragon (1984), novel written by Stephen King, 1000 copies, Signed/Limited
- The Plant, part 3 (1985)
- The Ideal Genuine Man (1987), a novel written by Don Robertson, ISBN 0-399-19993-4
- Six Stories (1997), a short story collection written by Stephen King, 1100 copies, Signed/Limited
- The New Lieutenant's Rap (1999), a short story written by Stephen King, 500 copies (approx.), Signed/Limited
- Guns (2013), an essay written by Stephen King, published as a 25-page e-book
