= Lunch at the Gotham Café =

- Short story by Stephen King
- Country: United States
- Language: English
- Genre: Horror

Publication
- Published in: Dark Love
- Publication type: Anthology
- Publisher: Roc Books
- Media type: Print (hardback and paperback)
- Publication date: 1995

"Lunch at the Gotham Café" is a horror short story by American writer Stephen King. It originally appeared in the 1995 anthology Dark Love. It won the 1995 Bram Stoker Award for Best Long Fiction.

== Plot summary ==
Steven Davis comes home one day to find a letter from his wife, Diane, coldly stating she has left him and intends to get a divorce. He finds himself baffled as to what led her to do this, and over time becomes increasingly depressed.

Diane's departure prompts him to give up cigarettes, and he begins to suffer nicotine withdrawal. Diane's lawyer, William Humboldt, calls Steve with plans to meet with the two of them for lunch. He decides on the Gotham Café on 53rd Street, and sets a date. Steve's lawyer is unable to attend due to a family crisis. Despite his lawyer's warnings, however, Steve is determined to keep the date and see Diane again.

While waiting he impulsively buys an umbrella, despite the weather being clear and sunny. Upon entering, he finds the maître d', eventually revealed to be named Guy, apparently in the beginnings of a psychotic break, talking senselessly about a non-existent dog. Convening with Diane and Humboldt at a table near the kitchen, Steve pleads with his estranged wife for an explanation. Much to Steve's consternation, she refuses to go into details and regards him with a mixture of apprehension and contempt. They immediately fall into petty squabbling as Humboldt attempts to get the meeting back on track.

Suddenly, Guy the maître d' makes a surprise reappearance, homicidally insane, screaming "Eeeee!", ranting in word salad, and brandishing a chef's knife. Going berserk, Guy brutally kills Humboldt. Steve briefly fends off the lunatic with his umbrella, then drags the helplessly terrified Diane into the kitchen. Guy gives chase and leaves the café's cook with a grisly injury. Desperately struggling to hold off the lunatic, Steve implores Diane to unbolt the rear entrance door so they can both escape, but she remains in a state of gaping shock. Steve is able to incapacitate Guy by dousing him with scalding water, and hitting him with a metal frying pan.

After finally escaping both the Café and Guy, Steve attempts to make sure Diane is all right. Diane recoils from his touch, and rants at him venomously, devoid of any shred of gratitude for his protection. The events of the last few minutes have only reinforced her perception of Steve as a bullying control freak, and she's decided it is time to stand up to him. When Steve tries to point out that he just saved her life, Diane flatly denies that he did. Incredulous and overwhelmed with fury, he loses interest in reconciliation; Diane's self-empowering harangue is sharply interrupted by Steve slapping her across the face. After attempting to wound him with claims of extramarital lovers, Diane leaves him for good.

As Steve sits on the curb watching an ambulance haul away both victims and the heavily restrained Guy, he is left wondering about Guy's private life, and the nature of insanity. He imagines Guy living in a similar situation to his own, driven insane by the irrationality of his wife, whom he may have murdered before coming to work this day, and the constant barking of the neighbor's dog. Under his breath, he starts to say, "Eeeee", perhaps wondering what appeal going insane might hold.

== Publication ==
"Lunch at the Gotham Café" was first published in the 1995 anthology Dark Love published by Roc Books (edited by Nancy A. Collins, Edward E. Kramer, and Martin H. Greenberg). In 1996, it was included in the ninth edition of anthology The Year's Best Fantasy and Horror. In 1997, it was published in the limited-edition collection Six Stories. In 2002, it was included in King's collection Everything's Eventual, with a scene from the story featured on the cover of the collection's first edition dust jacket.

== Adaptation ==
The story was adapted into a short film entitled Gotham Café in 2005, directed by Jack Edward Sawyers. It starred Chaney Kley as Steve, Julie Sands as Diane, Cullen Douglas as Guy, Kevin Brief as Humboldt, Endre Hules, Mick Garris, Robert Axelrod, and Stephen King in a cameo appearance as the voice of Mr. Ring, Steve's lawyer. Apple co-founder Steve Wozniak co-produced the film and also made a cameo appearance as an irate diner.

== See also ==
- Stephen King short fiction bibliography
