= In the Deathroom =

Short story by Stephen King

- Short story by Stephen King
- Country: United States
- Language: English
- Genre: Horror

Publication
- Published in: Secret Windows, Blood and Smoke (1st release), Everything's Eventual
- Publication type: Anthology
- Publisher: Book-of-the-Month Club
- Media type: Print (Paperback) & Audiobook
- Publication date: 1999

"In the Deathroom" is a horror short story by American writer Stephen King, first published as part of King's 1999 audiobook Blood and Smoke.

== Plot summary ==
Fletcher, a former reporter from The New York Times, has been captured by members of a South American dictatorship. The story begins as he is brought into the titular "Deathroom" for interrogation about an alleged communist insurgency, which he has been supporting due to the government having killed a group of nuns which included his sister. Fletcher realizes that his captors, despite their promises to the contrary, will not let him leave the Deathroom alive.

During the course of his interrogation, Fletcher manages to keep calm, and hatches a desperate plan to escape, which, to his surprise, actually works. He fakes an epileptic seizure and, in the captors' struggle to save him, steals a gun. After killing three of his captors and maiming another, he escapes the Deathroom. Fletcher, having no way of knowing if the gunfire was heard, starts up the stairs to see if he can escape.

The story ends with a man, almost certainly Fletcher, buying a pack of cigarettes at a newsstand kiosk in New York City.

== Publication ==
King describes "In the Deathroom" as "a slightly Kafka-esque story about an interrogation room in the South American version of Hell. In such stories, the fellow being interrogated usually ends up spilling everything and then being killed (or losing his mind). I wanted to write one with a happier ending, however unreal that might be."

"In the Deathroom" was originally published as part of King's 1999 audiobook Blood and Smoke. In 2000, it was first published in print in Secret Windows, a volume which was available to the Book of the Month Club only. In 2002, it was collected in King's mass-market publication, Everything's Eventual.

== See also ==
- Stephen King short fiction bibliography
