= Steven Spruill =

American novelist (born 1946)

Steven Gregory Spruill (born April 20, 1946) is an author of horror, science fiction, and thriller novels, best known for his "hemophage" novels: Rulers of Darkness, Daughter of Darkness, and Lords of Light. He has also written under the names Steve Harriman and Steve Lyon.

== Early life and education ==
He was raised in Battle Creek, Michigan and lives in Virginia. He and his wife, Nancy Lyon, married in 1969.

Spruill attended Andrews University, where he earned a Bachelor of Arts in 1968, and Catholic University of America, where he earned a Master of Arts in 1979 and a Ph.D. in clinical psychology in 1981.

== Career ==
Spruill began his career as a novelist with science fiction, and transitioned to contemporary thrillers in 1991 with the novel Painkiller.

Spruill told Contemporary Authors, "As a novelist I'd like to do in another way what I attempt to do as a psychotherapist: to free a person for a few hours from the unhappier side of his life and turn him on to the constructive power of his mind".

=== Critical reception ===
Spruill's works have been met with mixed critical reception.

Before I Wake (1991) was reviewed by Kirkus Reviews as, "Slick and readable, but despite all the menace, there's not a real chill anywhere. Readers are likely to find themselves counting coincidences when they should have been too scared to notice". However, Publishers Weekly wrote that Before I Wake was a "first-rate suspense novel".

A Kirkus Reviews review of My Soul To Take (1995) said, "Spruill disappoints in his take-that/no- take-that plotting, less reminiscent of Dean Koontz than of Wile E. Coyote". Publishers Weekly wrote, "An intriguing concept--a microchip inserted in the brain to cure blindness that also allows certain recipients to see the future--falls short of its potential in this poorly paced, digressive thriller".

About Rulers of Darkness (1998), Publishers Weekly said, "By adding a noir-crime spin to his medical-horror formula, Spruill manages to grab hold of, and ride reasonably high on, the cape-tails of Anne Rice and the current vampire craze". Kirkus Reviews wrote, "Terrific plotting—fresh indeed—and the hospital background shines in a seemingly unresolvable love story". Its sequel, Daughter of Darkness (1999), Kirkus Reviews wrote as having "less energy and richly layered excitement than before, but still notable in its field". Publishers Weekly noted some strengths of the Spruill in its review of Daughter of Darkness, including "his credible rendering of supernatural beings as members of a dysfunctional family with conflicting ideas about how to manage their problems shows a delightfully oddball sense of topicality, yet he is never less than sympathetic and balanced in his portrayal".

Nightkill (1997), published under the name Steve Lyon, was called "sure-fire" entertainment by Publishers Weekly.

== Selected works ==
=== As Steven Spruill ===
- Keepers of the Gate (Doubleday, 1977)
- The Janus Equation (1980)
- Hellstone (Playboy, 1980)
- Painkiller (St. Martin's, 1991)
- Before I Wake (St. Martin's, 1991)
- The Genesis Shield (Tor, 1993)
- My Soul to Take (St. Martin's, 1995)

==== Elias Kane series ====
- The Psychopath Plague (Doubleday, 1978)
- The Imperator Plot (Doubleday, 1983)
- The Paradox Planet (Doubleday, 1988)

==== Rulers of Darkness series ====
- Rulers of Darkness (St. Martin's, 1998)
- Daughter of Darkness (St. Martin's, 1999)
- Lords of Light (Hodder & Stoughton Ltd., 1999)

=== As Steve Lyon ===
- Nightkill (with F. Paul Wilson) (Forge, 1997)
- The Gift Moves (Houghton Mifflin, 2004)

=== As Steve Harriman ===
- Sleeper (Berkley, 2003)
- Absorbing Spongebob: Ten Ways to Squeeze More Happiness Out of Life (Berkley, 2005)
- Ice Men: A Novel of the Korean War (2009)
