= Mick Garris =

American filmmaker and screenwriter

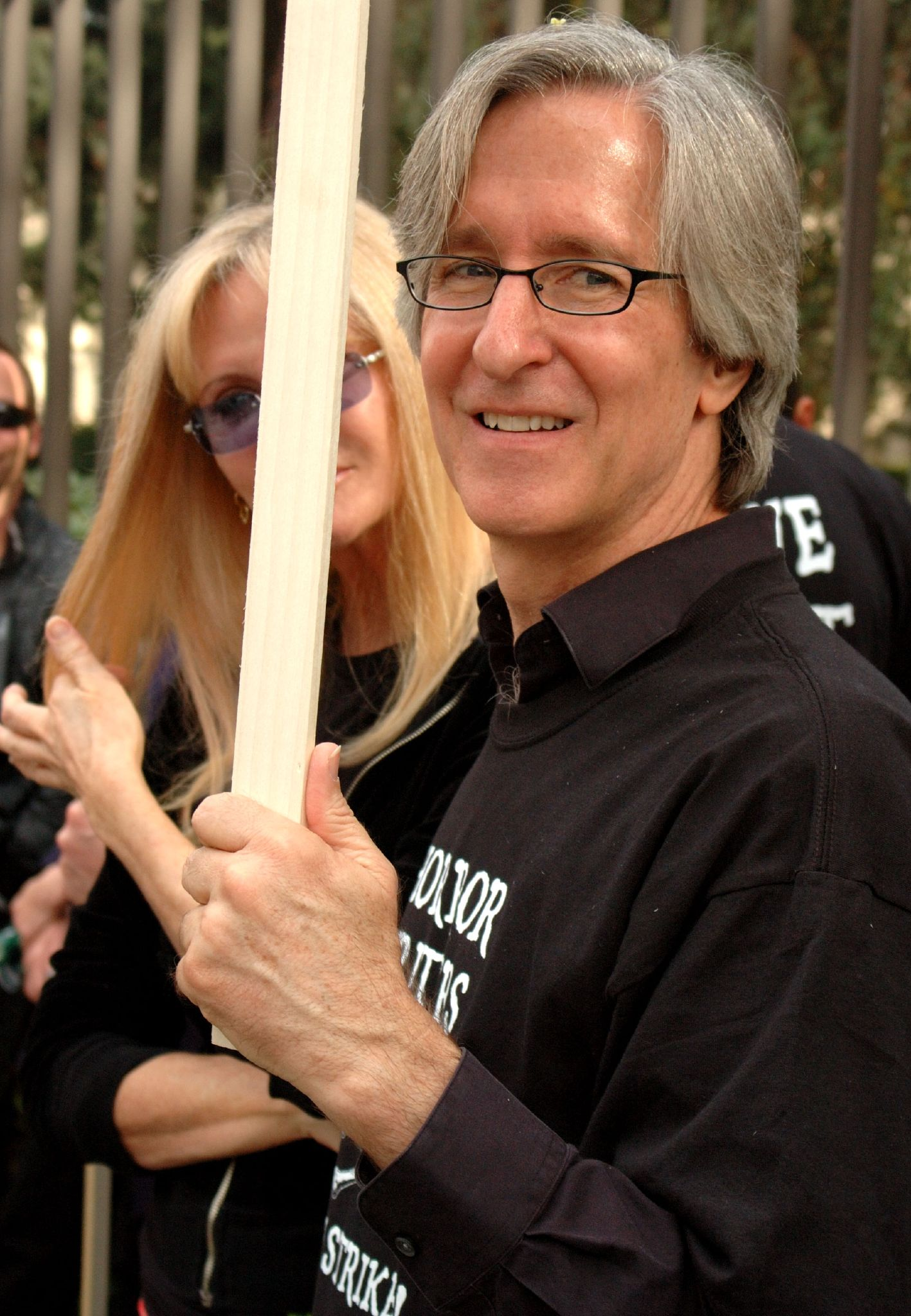
- Mick Garris during the 2007 Writers Guild of America strike
- Born: December 4, 1951 (age 74); Santa Monica, California, U.S.
- Occupations: Director; screenwriter; producer; novelist

Mick Garris (born December 4, 1951) is an American filmmaker, screenwriter and novelist born in Santa Monica, California. He is best known for his work in the horror film genre, as well as making Stephen King adaptations.

== Early life ==
Garris was born in Santa Monica, California and raised in Van Nuys.

== Career ==
He is known for his work in the horror genre. He has worked with Stephen King several times, such as directing the horror film Sleepwalkers, written by King and starring Mädchen Amick and is the creator of the Showtime series Masters of Horror and the NBC series Fear Itself. Garris won a 1986 Edgar Award for an episode he wrote for the Steven Spielberg-produced television series Amazing Stories. Garris directed the FEARnet web series Post Mortem. He contributes to the web series Trailers From Hell. Garris was also the co-screenwriter and executive producer of Hocus Pocus. Garris directed the 2011 miniseries adaption of Stephen King's novel Bag of Bones and the documentary film Pure in Heart: The Life and Legacy of Lon Chaney Jr., about the life and work of Legend actor Lon Chaney Jr., which screened on the Horror-Rama 2015 in October 2015. He has a role, as Himself in the biography horror film Digging Up the Marrow, from indie director Adam Green.

As of 2015, he is also a member of the board of advisers for the Hollywood Horror Museum.

On January 16, 2018, it was announced that Mick Garris's horror podcast Post Mortem would be joining Blumhouse's podcast network.

== Awards ==
In 2006, Garris received the Lifetime Achievement Award at the New York City Horror Film Festival. He received the award in person after a screening of his Masters of Horror episode "Valerie on the Stairs".

In 2018, he received the Career Achievement Award at Fantaspoa Festival in Porto Alegre, Brazil.

== Filmography ==
=== Film ===
Year	Title	Director	Writer	Producer	Notes
1987	Batteries Not Included	No	Story	No	
1988	Critters 2: The Main Course	Yes	Yes	No	
1989	The Fly II	No	Yes	No	
1992	Sleepwalkers	Yes	No	No	
1993	Hocus Pocus	No	Yes	Co-Executive	
1997	Michael Jackson's Ghosts	No	Yes	No	Musical short
2004	Riding the Bullet	Yes	Yes	Yes	
2014	Unbroken	No	No	Executive	
2018	Nightmare Cinema	Yes	Yes	Yes	Segments "The Projectionist", "Dead"

Acting roles

Year	Title	Role	Notes
1981	The Howling	Man with TV Guide	
1983	Michael Jackson's Thriller	Zombie	Musical short
1988	Critters 2: The Main Course	Critters (voice)	
1995	The Quick and the Dead	Young Herod's Man	
1996	The Stupids	Reporter #2	
2004	Riding the Bullet	Dr. Higgins	
2005	Gotham Cafe	Father Callahan	Short
2007	Brutal Massacre: A Comedy	Himself	
2010	The Man Who Saw Frankenstein Cry	Host	Documentary
2014	Digging Up the Marrow	Himself	
2015	Tales of Halloween	The Phantom	Segment "Grim Grinning Ghost"
2016	The Rift: Dark Side of the Moon	Martin	
2020	Sky Sharks	Dr. Gage Creed	

=== Television ===
Year	Title	Director	Producer	Writer	Creator	Notes
1979–1981	Fantasy Film Festival	No	Co-Producer	No	No	Talk show
1985–1987	Amazing Stories	Yes	No	Yes	No	Wrote teleplays for 8 episodes Directed and wrote story episode "Life on Death Row"; Story editor in 22 episodes
1986	Disneyland	Yes	Yes	Yes	No	Episode: "Fuzzbucket"
1988	Freddy's Nightmares	Yes	No	No	No	Episode: "Killer Instinct"
1990–1991	She-Wolf of London	No	No	Yes	Yes	Wrote episode "She-Wolf of London"; Also executive consultant for 20 episodes
1994	The Stand	Yes	No	No	No	4 episodes
1994	Tales from the Crypt	Yes	No	No	No	Episode: "Whirlpool"
1995	New York Undercover	Yes	No	No	No	Episode: "The Smoking Section"
1997	The Shining	Yes	No	No	No	3 episodes
2000	The Others	Yes	Supervising	Yes	No	Wrote episode "Don't Dream It's Over"; Director and supervising producer of 3 episodes
2001	The Judge	Yes	No	No	No	Episode: "Part One"
2005–2007	Masters of Horror	Yes	Executive	Yes	Yes	Wrote 4 episodes
2008–2009	Fear Itself	No	No	Yes	Yes	Wrote episode "The Sacrifice"
2010	Happy Town	Yes	No	No	No	Episode: "Polly Wants a Crack at Her"
2010–2016	Post Mortem with Mick Garris	No	Executive	No	Yes	
2011	Bag of Bones	Yes	Executive	No	No	2 episodes
2013	Pretty Little Liars	Yes	No	No	No	Episode: "Gamma Zeta Die!"
2014	Ravenswood	Yes	No	No	No	2 episodes
2014	Witches of East End	Yes	No	No	No	Episode: "The Fall of the House of Beauchamp"
2016	Shadowhunters	Yes	No	No	No	Episode: "The Descent Into Hell Isn't Easy"
2016	Dead of Summer	Yes	No	No	No	2 episodes
2017–2018	Once Upon a Time	Yes	No	No	No	2 episodes

TV movies

Year	Title	Director	Producer	Writer
1982	Take One: Fear on Film	No	Yes	No
1984	Cheeseball Presents	No	Associate	No
1990	Psycho IV: The Beginning	Yes	No	No
1997	Quicksilver Highway	Yes	Yes	Yes
1998	Virtual Obsession	Yes	Yes	Yes
2002	Lost in Oz	Yes	No	No
2006	Desperation	Yes	Executive	No

Acting roles

Year	Title	Role	Notes
1979–1981	Fantasy Film Festival	Host	Talk show
1982	Take One: Fear on Film	Host	Television film
1994	The Stand	Henry Dunbarton	Episode: "The Plague"
1997	Quicksilver Highway	Surgeon in Hospital Hallway	Television film
1997	The Shining	AA Hartwell	Episode #1.2
2010–2016	Post Mortem with Mick Garris	Host	11 episodes
2018–2020	Eli Roth's History of Horror	Self	9 episodes
2021	The Stand	Boulder Partygoer	Cameo

=== Documentary works ===
Direct-to-video

Year	Title	Writer	Producer
1982	Coming Soon	Yes	Yes

TV documentary film

Year	Title	Director	Producer	Writer
1980	Fear on Film: Inside "The Fog"	No	Yes	No
1982	The Making of a Chilling Tale	Yes	No	No
1982	The Making of "The Thing"	Yes	Yes	Yes

TV shorts

Year	Title	Director	Producer	Writer
1981	Making a Monster Movie: Inside "The Howling"	Yes	Yes	No
1983	The Making of "Videodrome"	Yes	Yes	Yes
1985	The Making of "The Goonies"	Yes	Yes	No

Consulting producer

Year	Title	Notes
2018	History of Horror	7 episodes

== Bibliography ==
Collections

- A Life in the Cinema (2000)
- These Evil Things We Do (2020)

Novels

- Development Hell (2011)
- Salome (2014)

Novellas

- Snow Shadows (2013)
- Tyler’s Third Act (2013)
- Ugly (2014)
