= British Fantasy Award for Best Novel =

Former literary award for speculative fiction

- Awarded for: Works over 40,000 words
- Country: United Kingdom
- Presented by: British Fantasy Society
- First award: 1972
- Final award: 2010
- Website: britishfantasysociety.org
- Related: British Fantasy Award for Best Horror Novel; British Fantasy Award for Best Fantasy Novel

The British Fantasy Award for Best Novel, also known as the August Derleth Award, was a literary award given annually as part of the British Fantasy Awards. It was first awarded in 1972. Beginning in 2012, the award was split into fantasy and horror categories.

== History ==
In 1971, Ramsey Campbell suggested that the British Fantasy Society should present an award in honor of August Derleth, who died the same year. In 1972, Michael Moorcock received the inaugural August Derleth Fantasy Award for his novel The Knight of the Swords. In later years, the number of award categories increased. In 1976, the BFS renamed the awards from the August Derleth Fantasy Awards to the British Fantasy Awards, maintaining that the Best Novel category would retain the August Derleth award title.

=== 2011 controversy and reorganization ===
In 2011, Sam Stone won the award. After the ceremony, editor and anthologist Stephen Jones posted a blog entry pointing out that several of the winning entries were published by Telos Publishing, a company owned by David Howe. At the time, Howe was also chair of the British Fantasy Society and romantic partner of Stone. Three days later, Stone returned the award, stating: "I do not wish to be seen as the winner that tore the British Fantasy Society in two... Therefore, I am returning the award for Best Novel."

After Stone returned her award, the other nominees declined to accept it, resulting in an announcement of "no award". From 2012 onward, the awards were reorganized. The awards were previous awarded via a popular vote from BFS members and convention attendees. After the reorganization, the power to select awards from the shortlist was given to a jury. The best novel category, then known as the August Derleth Award, was divided. The new awards included the British Fantasy Award for Best Horror Novel, retaining the title of August Derleth Award, and the British Fantasy Award for Best Fantasy Novel, the Robert Holdstock Award.

== Winners and shortlist ==
* Winners § Award returned

Year	Author	Work	Publisher	Ref.
1972	Michael Moorcock*	The Knight of the Swords		
1973	Michael Moorcock*	The King of the Swords		
1974	Poul Anderson*	Hrolf Kraki's Saga	Ballantine Books	
1975	Michael Moorcock*	The Sword and the Stallion		
1975	Michael Shea	A Quest for Simbilis		
1975	Richard Adams	Shardik		
1976	Michael Moorcock*	The Hollow Lands		
1976	Karl Edward Wagner	Bloodstone	Warner Books	
1976	Gary Myers	The House of the Worm	Arkham House	
1976	John Norman	Marauders of Gor	Ballantine Books	
1976	Adrian Cole	A Plague of Nightmares	Zebra Books	
1977	Gordon R. Dickson*	The Dragon and the George		
1977	Katherine Kurtz	Camber of Culdi		
1977	Anne Rice	Interview with the Vampire		
1978	Piers Anthony*	A Spell for Chameleon		
1978	Andrew J. Offutt	My Lord Barbarian	Ballantine Books	
1978	Fritz Leiber	Our Lady of Darkness	Berkley Books / Putnam	
1979	Stephen R. Donaldson*	The Chronicles of Thomas Covenant the Unbeliever	Holt, Rinehart & Winston	
1979	George R. R. Martin	Dying of the Light	Gollancz	
1979	Michael Moorcock	Gloriana	Allison & Busby	
1979	Tanith Lee	The Quest of the White Witch	DAW Books	
1979	Richard Cowper	The Road to Corlay	Gollancz	
1980	Tanith Lee*	Death's Master		
1980	Patricia A. McKillip	Harpist in the Wind	Atheneum Books	
1980	Phyllis Eisenstein	Sorcerer's Son		
1981	Ramsey Campbell*	To Wake the Dead	Millington	
1981	Stephen King	Firestarter	MacDonald Futura	
1981	Tanith Lee	Kill the Dead	DAW Books	
1981	M. John Harrison	A Storm of Wings	Sphere Books	
1981	Stephen R. Donaldson	The Wounded Land	Sidgwick & Jackson	
1982	Stephen King*	Cujo		
1982	Katherine Kurtz	Camber the Heretic	Del Rey Books	
1982	Tanith Lee	Delusion's Master	DAW Books	
1982	Ramsey Campbell	The Nameless	Macmillan Publishers	
1983	Gene Wolfe*	The Sword of the Lictor	Timescape Books	
1983	M. John Harrison	In Viriconium		
1983	Robert Bloch	Psycho II		
1984	Peter Straub*	Floating Dragon		
1985	Ramsey Campbell*	Incarnate	Macmillan Publishers	
1985	Jack Vance	Lyonesse	Panther Books	
1985	Angela Carter	Nights at the Circus	Chatto & Windus	
1986	T. E. D. Klein*	The Ceremonies	Viking Press	
1987	Stephen King*	It	Viking Press	
1987	Brian Lumley	Necroscope	Voyager	
1987	Dean Koontz	Strangers	Putnam	
1988	Ramsey Campbell*	The Hungry Moon		
1989	Ramsey Campbell*	The Influence		
1990	Dan Simmons*	Carrion Comfort	Dark Harvest	
1991	Ramsey Campbell*	Midnight Sun		
1992	Jonathan Carroll*	Outside the Dog Museum	MacDonald	
1992	Ramsey Campbell	The Count of Eleven		
1992	Dan Simmons	Summer of Night	Putnam	
1993	Graham Joyce*	Dark Sister		
1994	Ramsey Campbell*	The Long Lost	Headline Publishing Group	
1995	Michael Marshall Smith*	Only Forward	HarperCollins UK	
1995	Brian Lumley	Blood Wars		
1995	Mark Chadbourn	Nocturne		
1995	Paul J. McAuley	Pasquale's Angel	Gollancz	
1995	Kim Newman	The Quorum		
1996	Graham Joyce*	Requiem	Signet Creed	
1996	Simon Clark	Blood Crazy	Hodder & Stoughton	
1996	Chaz Brenchley	Dead of Light		
1996	Stephen R. Donaldson	The Gap Into Madness: Chaos and Order	HarperCollins UK	
1996	Stephen Baxter	The Time Ships	HarperCollins UK	
1997	Graham Joyce*	The Tooth Fairy	Signet UK	
1997	Robin Hobb	Assassin's Apprentice	Bantam Spectra / Orbit Books	
1997	Iain Banks	Excession	Bantam Spectra / Orbit Books	
1997	Peter Straub	The Hellfire Club	Random House / HarperCollins	
1997	Terry Pratchett	Hogfather	Gollancz	
1997	Clive Barker	Sacrament	HarperCollins	
1997	Storm Constantine	Scenting Hallowed Blood	Signet	
1997	Michael Marshall Smith	Spares	HarperCollins UK / Bantam Books	
1998	Chaz Brenchley*	Light Errant		
1998	Ramsey Campbell	The House on Nazareth Hill		
1998	Tim Lebbon	Mesmer		
1998	David Eddings	Polgara the Sorceress		
1998	Leigh Eddings	Polgara the Sorceress		
1998	M. John Harrison	Signs of Life		
1999	Stephen King*	Bag of Bones	Hodder & Stoughton	
1999	Stephen Laws	Chasm	Hodder & Stoughton	
1999	Robert Holdstock	Gate of Ivory, Gate of Horn	Roc Books / Harper Voyager	
1999	Jonathan Carroll	Kissing The Beehive	Gollancz	
1999	Michael Marshall Smith	One of Us	HarperCollins UK	
1999	Charles de Lint	Someplace to be Flying	Tor Books / Macmillan Publishers	
1999	Graham Joyce	The Stormwatcher	Penguin UK	
1999	Simon Clark	Vampyrrhic	Hodder & Stoughton	
2000	Graham Joyce*	Indigo	Michael Joseph	
2000	Freda Warrington	The Amber Citadel	Earthlight	
2000	Jonathan Carroll	The Marriage of Sticks	Gollancz	
2000	Chaz Brenchley	Shelter	Hodder & Stoughton	
2000	Mark Chadbourn	World's End	Gollancz	
2001	China Miéville*	Perdido Street Station	Macmillan Publishers	
2001	Tim Lebbon	Hush	Razorblade Press	
2001	Gavin Williams	Hush	Razorblade Press	
2001	Peter Straub	Mr. X	HarperCollins	
2001	Steve Lockley	The Ragchild	Razorblade Press	
2001	Paul Lewis	The Ragchild	Razorblade Press	
2001	Ramsey Campbell	Silent Children	Tor Books / Forge	
2002	Simon Clark*	The Night of the Triffids	Hodder & Stoughton	
2002	Mark Chadbourn	Always Forever	Gollancz	
2002	Neil Gaiman	American Gods	Headline Feature	
2002	Gwyneth Jones	Bold as Love	Gollancz	
2002	Graham Joyce	Smoking Poppy	Gollancz	
2003	China Miéville*	The Scar	Macmillan Publishers	
2003	Ramsey Campbell	The Darkest Part of the Woods	PS Publishing	
2003	Mark Chadbourn	The Devil in Green	Gollancz	
2003	Graham Joyce	The Facts of Life	Gollancz	
2003	Jonathan Carroll	White Apples	Tor Books	
2004	Christopher Fowler*	Full Dark House	Doubleday UK	
2004	Jon Courtenay Grimwood	Felaheen: The Third Arabesk	Earthlight	
2004	Peter Straub	lost boy, lost girl	HarperCollins UK	
2004	James Herbert	Nobody True	Macmillan Publishers	
2004	Liz Williams	The Poison Master	Tor UK	
2004	Simon Clark	Vampyrrhic Rites	Hodder & Stoughton	
2005	Stephen King*	The Dark Tower VII: The Dark Tower	Hodder & Stoughton	
2005	Clive Barker	Abarat: Days of Magic, Nights of War	Voyager	
2005	Susanna Clarke	Jonathan Strange & Mr Norrell	Bloomsbury Publishing	
2005	Mark Chadbourn	The Queen of Sinister	Gollancz	
2005	Christopher Fowler	The Water Room	Doubleday	
2006	Neil Gaiman*	Anansi Boys	Headline Publishing Group	
2006	George R. R. Martin	A Feast for Crows	Voyager	
2006	Mark Chadbourn	The Hounds of Avalon	Gollancz	
2006	Mark Morris	Nowhere Near an Angel	PS Publishing	
2006	Ramsey Campbell	Secret Stories	PS Publishing	
2006	Hal Duncan	Vellum	Pan Macmillan	
2007	Tim Lebbon*	Dusk	Bantam Spectra	
2007	Sarah Pinborough	Breeding Ground	Leisure Books	
2007	Chaz Brenchley	Bridge of Dreams	Ace Books	
2007	Mike Carey	The Devil You Know	Orbit Books	
2007	Mark Samuels	The Face of Twilight	PS Publishing	
2007	Mark Chadbourn	Jack of Ravens	Gollancz	
2007	Scott Lynch	The Lies of Locke Lamora	Gollancz	
2007	M. John Harrison	Nova Swing	Gollancz	
2007	Conrad Williams	The Unblemished	Earthling	
2008	Ramsey Campbell*	The Grin of the Dark	PS Publishing	
2008	Joe Hill	Heart-Shaped	Gollancz	
2008	Michael Marshall	The Intruders	HarperCollins	
2008	Michael Marshall Smith	The Servants	Earthling	
2008	Sarah Pinborough	The Taken	Dorchester Publishing	
2008	Dan Simmons	The Terror	Little, Brown and Company	
2009	William Heaney*	Memoirs of a Master Forger	Gollancz	
2009	Simon Clark	Midnight Man	Severn House Publishers	
2009	Gary McMahon	Rain Dogs	Humdrumming	
2009	Neil Gaiman	The Graveyard Book	Bloomsbury Publishing	
2009	Christopher Fowler	The Victoria Vanishes	Little, Brown and Company	
2009	Ramsey Campbell	Thieving Fear	PS Publishing	
2010	Conrad Williams*	One	Virgin Books	
2010	Joe Abercrombie	Best Served Cold	Gollancz	
2010	Mike Carey	The Naming of the Beasts	Orbit Books	
2010	Stephen King	Under the Dome	Hodder & Stoughton	
2010	Sam Stone	Futile Flame	House of Murky Depths	
2011	Sam Stone§	Demon Dance	The House of Murky Depths	
2011	Adam Nevill	Apartment 16	Pan Macmillan	
2011	Tom Fletcher	The Leaping	Quercus	
2011	Gary McMahon	Pretty Little Dead Things	Angry Robot	
2011	Graham Joyce	The Silent Land	Gollancz	
