= Sleeping in Flame =

1988 novel by Jonathan Carroll

- First edition (UK)
- Author: Jonathan Carroll
- Cover artist: Wayne Anderson (1988)
- Language: English
- Genre: Fantasy
- Publisher: Legend Books (UK); Doubleday (US)
- Publication date: 1988 (UK); 1989 (US)
- Publication place: United States
- Media type: Hardcover
- Pages: 273
- ISBN: 0-385-24957-8
- OCLC: 18411216
- Dewey Decimal: 813/.54 19
- LC Class: PS3553.A7646 S54 1989
- Preceded by: Bones of the Moon
- Followed by: A Child Across the Sky

Sleeping in Flame is a novel by the American writer Jonathan Carroll. Originally published in 1988, the novel was nominated for a World Fantasy Award the following year.

== Plot summary ==
The narrator, Walker Easterling, is a film actor and screenwriter. His director friend Nicholas Sylvian introduces him to Maris York, a sculptor who makes model cities and who is freeing herself from Luc, her abusive partner. On the day Maris and Walker meet, Luc has just threatened to kill her, so Walker and Nicholas take her away to Vienna, where Maris and Walker commence a relationship. Walker, who knows nothing about his parents or family background, discovers that he can perform magical acts and has dreams of inhabiting another identity, that of an Austrian named Moritz Benedikt who fought in the Second World War and was subsequently murdered. After Maris' brother Ingram loses his lover in an earthquake, Walker is able to foretell, or induce, Ingram's meeting with a certain Michael Billa, who will be a significant person in Ingram's life. (The consequences of Ingram's and Billa's friendship are recounted in Black Cocktail.) Through an acquaintance, screenwriter Philip Strayhorn, Walker meets Venasque, a mystic and teacher who appears in several other Carroll books. With Venasque's help, Walker learns to control his talent, but inadvertently causes Venasque's death because of the strength of his powers. He is contacted by his real father, a little man with no genitals whose name he does not know. The little man is an immortal (and the real-life source of the Rumpelstiltskin legend) who has murdered all Walker's previous incarnations, the last of whom was Moritz Benedikt, because they kept falling in love with women and repudiating the little man's sterile immortality. His father tries to persuade Walker to leave Maris by telling him that she'll mourn him forever and never love anyone else; this above all persuades Walker that his father is selfish and evil. Thanks to his and Maris' complete understanding of each other, Walker is able to discover his father's name in a city which Maris is building him as a birthday present. Walker uses his magic powers to call up the two sisters who originally told the Rumpelstiltskin story to the Grimm brothers. The sisters retell the story, changing it to end with the little man's death. Soon after Maris' and Walker's son is born, a little girl (apparently the original source of the Little Red Riding Hood story) appears on the doorstep and tells Walker: "You're dangerous." As Walker observes that "nothing in life is done without regret", it seems that his and Maris' son has been affected in some way by the vengeful immortals.

== References in other Carroll novels ==
Like most of Carroll's books, Sleeping in Flame includes a number of highly detailed characters, some of whom appear in other novels. At one point Walker works on a film with director Weber Gregston, who appears in Bones of the Moon and is the narrator of A Child Across the Sky, which also features Philip Strayhorn.

Venasque and the Easterlings appear in Outside the Dog Museum. The protagonist of Outside the Dog Museum, Harry Radcliffe, is the subject of an anecdote Venasque tells Walker in "Sleeping in Flame", and also appears briefly in the hospital scene.

Walker and Maris also appear briefly in Carroll's 1995 novel From the Teeth of Angels, in which they have a baby son, Nicholas, who was born with a hole in the heart. Gregston and Strayhorn also appear.
