= The Panic Hand =

1995 collection of horror stories by Jonathan Carroll

- Author: Jonathan Carroll
- Language: English
- Published: 1995 HarperCollins
- Publication place: United States
- Pages: 295
- ISBN: 0312146981

The Panic Hand is a collection of horror stories by the American writer Jonathan Carroll, first published in 1995. He wrote eight novels prior to this collection, including The Land of Laughs and A Child Across the Sky. The US edition includes the novella Black Cocktail, originally published as a standalone work.
