= The Year of the Ladybird =

2013 novel by Graham Joyce

- First edition cover
- Author: Graham Joyce
- Cover artist: Nick Castle
- Language: English
- Genre: Fantasy, ghost story
- Publisher: Gollancz
- Publication date: June 2013
- Publication place: United Kingdom
- Media type: Hardback
- Pages: 265
- ISBN: 978-0-575-11531-6

The Year of the Ladybird is a fantasy novel by English writer Graham Joyce, first published in the United Kingdom in June 2013 by Victor Gollancz Ltd, and in the United States as The Ghost in the Electric Blue Suit in August 2014 by Doubleday. It was the last novel Joyce wrote before he died in September 2014. It was shortlisted for the 2014 British Fantasy Award for Best Horror Novel (August Derleth Award). The novel relates a ghost story set during the 1976 British Isles heatwave. It was named for the plague of ladybirds, dubbed "the year of the ladybird", that swept the United Kingdom that year due to the extreme heat.

== Summary ==
College student David Barwise secures a summer job at a run-down holiday resort in the seaside town of Skegness, Lincolnshire in eastern England. He needs money, but he is also running away from his stepfather, who has a job lined up for him in the family business. He chose Skegness because of a photograph he found of his biological father, who died when David was three. It is taken at the resort town, and David hopes that this job will help him remember his birth father.

Amid the sweltering heat and the seven-spot ladybirds, David helps entertain the visitors. He gets to know the other entertainers and resort staff, Madam Rosa, the fortune teller, AbdulShazam, the magician, and scam artists, always ready to rip off the tourists. Keen to make new friends, David unwittingly finds himself consorting with members of the far-right National Front. Then there are the strange sightings of a man in an electric blue suit and a child. David only ever sees them in the distance, and only he can see them.

== Critical reception ==
In a review in Strange Horizons, Niall Alexander described the novel as "a haunting unlike any I've read of in recent memory", and definitely "not your garden variety ghost story". He said the book only touches on the supernatural and draws on "material evils" rather than "sinister, insubstantial spirits." Alexander called The Year of the Ladybird a "tender tale of David's coming of age at a pivotal point in British history", and Joyce's "most satisfying effort" since his 2008 novel, Memoirs of a Master Forger. But Alexander added that what is missing from Ladybird is "Joyce's ability to engineer—not behind the scenes but in plain sight—a feeling that something magical is happening, something extraordinary".

Writing in SF Book Reviews, Antony Jones found The Year of the Ladybird "an incredibly warm and rewarding journey" full of nostalgia and memories of "long, lazy summer days and that feeling of being young, free and alive." He said it is a coming-of-age story with only a suggestion of fantasy. Jones complimented Joyce for bringing his characters to life and making them so real, "warts and all".

Reviewing The Year of the Ladybird in Foundation, Andrew Hedgecock described the book as "a thoroughly convincing and compelling portrayal of the journey from teenager to adult." He said David is a "likeable but difficult narrator", not because of his self-deception, but because of his "profound honesty in revealing his flaws". Hedgecock said the book "offers a subtle and compelling insight into a dangerous corner in British social and political history", and is "an unsettling encounter with the numinous". He stated that Joyce is "one of our most original, morally engaged and entertaining writers."

In a review of the American edition of the book, The Ghost in the Electric Blue Suit at National Public Radio, Jason Heller wrote, "Joyce has written a jewel of a novel that blends gentle nostalgia, Bildungsroman angst, and a glimpse of the dark, unreal places where loss and memory mingle." Heller praised Joyce's prose, saying it is "exquisite, but never extravagant", and noted that as in his Some Kind of Fairy Tale, "the thin wall between reality and what lies beyond is achingly stretched." He said The Ghost in the Electric Blue Suit is "unearthly, but ... also wonderfully funny", deceptively simple, but very subtle."
