= Kingdom of the Serpent =

The Kingdom of the Serpent is the third in a series of trilogies written by Mark Chadbourn. Set in modern-day Britain, it continues from The Age of Misrule and The Dark Age.

The first book in the trilogy, Jack of Ravens, was released on 20 July 2006. The second, The Burning Man, was released on 17 April 2008. The third book, Destroyer of Worlds, was released in August 2009.

== Background ==
The first trilogy in the series, The Age of Misrule, told of the catastrophic return to Britain of the Old Gods of legend, and the battle of a group of five known as the Brothers and Sisters of Dragons to protect humanity. The Dark Age explored the lives of a new group of Brothers and Sisters, struggling to cope in the new world left behind in the wake of the first trilogy. Kingdom of the Serpent picks up the story where the cliffhanger ending of The Dark Age left off. The world, returning to the old ways due to the influence of the returning Gods, was dealt a dreadful blow by an entity known as the Void, recreating the menial, soul-destroying world it had become before the Gods' return, and trapping the Brothers and Sisters of Dragons - the only ones who could fight it - in menial lives, their heritage forgotten and their power lying dormant. The only one who can save them is Jack Churchill who, following the final battle with the dark god Balor has found himself lost in Bronze-age Britain

This series begins with Jack waking up in The Second Battle of Mag Tuired, wandering about in a mist, he is beginning to forget who he is, and comes across a giant fighting with some Celtic warriors and ends up slaying it with his sword, earning the name 'Jack Giant Killer'. The warriors convince the a village to take Jack in, who is miserable as he is losing his memories of Ruth and his life before, it is revealed that this is due to the spider embedded in his shoulder, which is eventually removed as it is apparently killing him slowly, whilst saving him four Iron Age Celts and Church end up becoming the first brothers and sisters of dragons.

Church is tricked by Niamh, who is selfish and arrogant, into becoming her slave by giving him food and drink which was not given without obligation and she takes him into the otherworld. Whilst traveling to Niamh's court he meets fellow prisoner, 'the Mocker' or Jerzy, who was stolen to entertain and Niamh ended up sending him to the court of the final word for some adjustments leaving his face disfigured in a large rictus grin.

Church realises that because of the way time moves in the otherworld he may yet see Ruth again someday, and begins hopping periodically through time, via the otherworld. Meanwhile, the void has taken Ryan Veitch into its service as he has become bitter and twisted about how he was killed for something out of his control (being used by a caraprix) and systematically goes through time killing as many brothers and sisters of dragons as he can, whilst working with a sinister, flamboyant character none as the 'Libertarian'. Who is described as having 'red lidless eyes'. Erego Veitch kills the first brother and sisters of dragons whilst Church is stuck in the otherworld with Niamh, and writes 'scum' on the wall in blood hinting that Veitch is the killer. Also the first brothers and sisters of dragons are taken into the service of the void as the brothers and sisters of spiders.

Church encounters Tom as well, while in the other world and Niamh begins to change into the character we see in the Age of Misrule. Church eventually figures out someones killing off all brothers and sisters of dragons and begins to bring them back to the other world in preparation for a final battle. As the church was doing this, the void was manipulating humans and bringing Gods to its cause like that of 'Janus god of doorways' and 'Loki' the Norse trickster god. When Jack appears in Rome Veitch captures him and takes him to Janus who traps him in a series of what are described to be like vines which leaches Jack's pendragon spirit. Church is rescued and later into the night the lantern containing his pendragon spirit (which he has to get back inside him if he wishes to defeat the void) is stolen. All the while The court of the final word was searching the heart of existence in the hope that not only will they survive the void but the evolution of humans as well. When Niamh gives Church a chance of freedom he instead gifts it to Jerzy who races to a roof and tries to jump off and reveals he stole the lamp for the court of the final word and has a caraprix within his head. When they travel to stonehenge in 1851, Jerzy disappears, kidnapped by the Puck, one of the oldest things in the land.

Veitch and the Libertarian begin to search for the extinction shears which can wipe something totally from existence as if it never existed. In 1969 the libertarian offers Church a deal to be placed in a 'sleep like death' and locked in a casket in the otherworld forever, and in doing so Laura, Shavi and Ruth would not be killed in the present. Trapped inside his head Church meets the Caretaker and the Daughters Of The Night, and is guided to the Axis of Existence and if offered to use it to do anything he wants. He brings back Niamh and Thomas the Rhymer, but the price was that Niamh was to be evil and worked for the void. Church was unaware of this.

Realising who they were, Laura, Shavi, and Ruth find clues everywhere leading them to travel to the otherworld in search of Church. With a kiss Ruth wakes Church.

== Major characters ==
Jack Churchill: Leader of the Brothers and Sisters of Dragons in The Age of Misrule, the man known as 'Church' has been missing since that trilogy's conclusion.
Ruth Gallagher: Formerly a powerful witch with the patronage of the Triple Goddess, a powerful member of the Tuatha Dé Danann, Ruth has been trapped in a thankless life working in a care home.
Laura DuSantiago: During their original journey, Laura was given the patronage of Cernunnos. Like Ruth, she has become trapped in a menial life, flipping burgers at a fast food stall.
Shavi: A bisexual Shaman, Shavi is also trapped in the new world.
Ryan Veitch: Believed lost after the events of The Age of Misrule, Ryan has a new and disturbing role to play in our newly altered world.
