= Bones of the Moon =

1987 novel by Jonathan Carroll

- First edition (UK)
- Author: Jonathan Carroll
- Cover artist: James Marsh (1987); Wayne Anderson (1987)
- Language: English
- Genre: Horror, fantasy
- Publisher: Arbor House (US); Century (UK)
- Publication date: January 12, 1987 (US); May 31, 1987 (UK)
- Publication place: United States
- Media type: Print (hardback & paperback)
- Pages: 216 (1st ed. HB)
- ISBN: 0-7126-1504-0 (1st ed. HB)
- OCLC: 17850838

Bones of the Moon is a novel by American writer Jonathan Carroll, depicting the real and dream life of a young woman. Like many of Carroll's works, it straddles the horror and fantasy genres.

The novel follows a young woman named Cullen James. While a contented housewife by day, in dreams she is one of several questers after the Bones of the Moon, which grant power over the dream world of Rondua. Gradually, dream events begin to bleed over into the real world in frightening ways.

== Plot summary ==
In New York City, Cullen James' greatest wishes are fulfilled: she marries her best friend, travels in Europe, and has a baby daughter.

But by night, bizarre dreams begin to intrude. In her dreams, Cullen visits a strange land called Rondua, where the sea is full of fish with mysterious names. She and a huge dog named Mr. Tracy escort a young boy named Pepsi across places such as the Northern Stroke, the Mountains of Coin and Brick, and the Plain of Forgotten Machines. Together they search for the Bones of the Moon, five bones that grant power over Rondua.

As Cullen's days become more disjointed and episodic, her dreams grow in intensity. While searching for the last of the bones, she learns more about the adversary she and her dream friends race against. Bit by bit, the events in Rondua start affecting her life on earth, intersecting in unpleasant, then frightening ways.

== Characters ==
Real world

- Cullen James, a young woman who seeks the Bones of the Moon in her dreams
- Danny James, Cullen's husband
- Mae, their baby daughter
- Eliot, her upstairs neighbor
- Alvin Williams, the Axe Boy, a polite young man who kills his mother and sister
- Weber Gregston, a movie director

Rondua

- Pepsi, a young boy seeking after the bones
- Mr. Tracy, a dog the size of a hot-air balloon who wears a bowler hat
- Jack Chili, the ruler of Rondua

== Major themes ==
The novel deals heavily with the emotional consequences of abortion.

== Allusions and references from other works ==
- Weber Gregston, a minor character in this novel, is the main character in A Child Across the Sky.
- The "A Game of You" story arc of Neil Gaiman's Sandman comic book is similar to this novel, as acknowledged in the preface to the graphic novel of the same name. The two stories were written separately, with neither author having knowledge of the other's work. When Gaiman read Bones of the Moon, he considered scrapping the storyline, but Carroll told him to go ahead. This is why there is a copy of Bones of the Moon visible in the lead character's bookcase in the comics.

== Reception ==
In their January 1987 issue, Kirkus Reviews wrote, "Carroll's greatest successes here are with lovable characters, not with his plot—and then only with the characters from real life, not those from psychedelic Rondua—which lacks a sufficiently felt imagination, some kind of tactile sting, so that it's hard to care about human problems amid its burgeoning symbols."

Dave Langford reviewed Bones of the Moon for White Dwarf #94, writing, "As in Carroll's fine novel The Land of Laughs, the apparent whimsies are heavily booby-trapped and the sudden conclusion leaves you shaken. Highly recommended."

== Reviews ==
- Review by Mark Valentine (1987) in Vector 140
- Review by Faren Miller (1987) in Locus, #322 November 1987
- Review by Darrell Schweitzer (1988) in Aboriginal Science Fiction, March–April 1988
- Review by Don D'Ammassa (1988) in Science Fiction Chronicle, #102 March 1988
- Review by Kathryn Cramer (1988) in The New York Review of Science Fiction, November 1988
- Review by Andy Robertson (1988) in Interzone, #23 Spring 1988
- Review by John Clute (1989) in Interzone, #32 November–December 1989
- Review by Gregory Feeley (1989) in Foundation, #44 Winter 1988/89
- Review by Janeen Webb (1991) in The New York Review of Science Fiction, June 1991
- Review by Bruce Gillespie (1992) in SF Commentary, #71/72
- Review by Don D'Ammassa (2002) in Science Fiction Chronicle, #223 April 2002
- Review by Chris Hill (2002) in Vector 225
