= Dreamside (disambiguation) =

Dreamside is a novel by Graham Joyce.

Dreamside may also refer to:

- The Dreamside, Dutch rock band
- "Dreamside", a song on the 2006 Unreal (End of You album)
- Dreamside kingdoms in the webcomic Cucumber Quest
