= The Crane's View Trilogy =

Novel series by Jonathan Carroll

Crane's View is a trilogy of novels written by American author Jonathan Carroll from 1997 to 2001, published by Nan A. Talese/Doubleday. All three books in the series take place in the small town of Crane's View. While there is some character overlap, each book focuses on a new main character and their story. The books received reviews that ranged from average to good. Between all three novels, Carroll has been nominated three times and placed twice for various novel and fantasy book awards.

== Reception ==
Kirkus Reviews called Kissing the Beehive a beautifully blended story with a "smashing and surprising climax."

Charles de Lint praised The Marriage of Sticks as "classic Carroll: witty, wise, strange, elusive, immediate", declaring that "it also continues his recent trend of producing endings as satisfying as one could hope for from the quality of how the novels begin and the stories build."

Katherine Dunn says that "The Wooden Sea is a treat, and I'm heading out to look for more Jonathan Carroll titles. Frannie, the worldly war-stung small town cop, hits classic status for me. His luminously hard-boiled American voice is smart, funny, and devastatingly decent. Kind of guy you're glad to follow anywhere--even into the strange zones of The Wooden Sea.”

== Books in the series ==
- Kissing the Beehive (late December 1997): When the novel was published in Great Britain the following year, Carroll added a three-page epilogue at the request of its publisher, Victor Gollancz. Director David Lynch once expressed an interest in directing a film version of the novel. Kissing the Beehive was nominated for the British Fantasy Award in 1999. The novel received renewed attention in early 2008, when Kissing the Beehive was announced as a tentative title for the second studio album by Canadian indie rock band Wolf Parade. After the existence of Carroll's book was pointed out to the band, the band retracted the title rather than risking a copyright infringement issue. Wolf Parade vocalist Spencer Krug said the band "didn't know that was the title of a book... We might have to change it, but we might not. And we'll have to make it clear that it's not [named] after his book. It's a complicated situation." The album's title was eventually announced as At Mount Zoomer, although it does include a song titled "Kissing the Beehive". Kissing the Beehive focuses on Sam Bayer, a struggling author with writer's block. On an impulse, Sam decides to visit his home town where as a teenager he discovered the body of murdered honor roll student, Pauline Ostrova. Together with a group made up of other members of the town, Sam begins to investigate the murder in order to publish a nonfiction book about the case.
- The Marriage of Sticks (2000): The book was nominated for the August Derleth Award at the British Fantasy Awards 2000. It lost to Indigo by Graham Joyce. That same year it placed 10th at the Locus Awards in the Fantasy Novel category. The book tells the story of the relationship between Miranda, who has a successful career and lonely life, and the already-married Hugh. Miranda sees visions and strangers whom she feels she knows. In the end, Miranda has to face herself and her actions.
- The Wooden Sea (2001): a New York Times Notable Book. In 2002, Carroll's third book in the series was nominated for the World Fantasy Award in the novel category. The World Fantasy Convention took place in Minneapolis, Minnesota. Also in 2002, the book placed 4th at The Locus Awards in the Fantasy Novel category. The book lost to Ursula K. Le Guin's The Other Wind. Other notable nominees include Neil Gaiman's American God's and Charles De Lint's The Onion Girl. The novel focuses on Frannie McCabe, the police chief of Crane's View and friend of Sam Bayer. Frannie has to deal with a series of unexplainable situations that eventually lead him to solving mysteries with aliens. In an interview Jonathan Carroll alludes to how much fun he had writing Frannie McCabe. He mentions how McCabe always made him laugh and was fun to hang out with.
