= Sea Dragon Heir =

1999 novel by Storm Constantine

The Sea Dragon Heir
- First edition
- Author: Storm Constantine
- Language: English
- Series: Mangravadian series
- Genre: Fantasy
- Publication date: January 1, 1999
- Publication place: United Kingdom
- Media type: Hardcover
- ISBN: 978-0-312-87366-0
- OCLC: 46429044
- Followed by: The Crown of Silence (2000)

The Sea Dragon Heir is a 1999 fantasy novel by Storm Constantine.

== Plot ==
The plot centers on a royal family, long tainted by a curse put upon them by the emperor many hundreds of years before. The son of every Palindrake (literally meaning Water Dragon) king was named Valraven; according to the traditional mythology, any woman that he took to wife would immediately become the Sea Wife, a being who could capture and hold the dragon daughters within herself. The emperor tries twice, once unsuccessfully and once successfully, to awaken the dragon queen and her daughters.

=== Part One ===
Sea Dragon Heir starts with Pharinet describing her life as a young girl, playing in the gardens with her best friends Ellony and Khaster, and thinking about her brother's future.

=== Part Two ===
Valraven and Pharinet engage in twincest, leaving Pharinet pregnant with her brother's child. Valraven attends a military academy where he meets a brash and sexually extrovert young man. Pharinet visits a soothsayer who predicts the miscarriage of her child. The prediction is realised a few days after she leaves.

=== Part Three ===
Valraven returns with his lover, who takes an interest in Pharinet, culminating in them having sex. He empties his seed into her saying, "Now I have been in both of you." Ellony is possessed by the Sea Dragon's singing, so allured by the melody that she runs into the sea and drowns.

== Characters ==
- Valraven: The Sea Dragon Heir. His military nature could perhaps explain his aloofness and incapacity to show emotion. On the other hand the "accident" on the beach could explain the change in his personality.
- Pharinet: Valraven's twin sister. The two share an incestuous relationship in Part One. However the death of Ellony marks a significant change in his attitude towards Pharinet.
- Ellony: The first Sea Wife. Ellony was Pharinet's best friend when they were younger, but when Ellony was betrothed to Valraven and pronounced just how much she loved Pharinet's brother, whose heart was already taken by herself, she began to hate Ellony. Ellony did not really know this and she believed that she was still Pharinet's best friend, even after her own wedding. She died during the "accident" though, taken into the sea by the Dragon Queen's daughters.
- Khaster: Ellony's brother. Khaster married Pharinet at the same time as Ellony married Valraven, and he also joined the military like Valraven.

== Reception ==
Kirkus Reviews called Sea Dragon Heir "a carefully plotted, beautifully detailed fantasy family-saga" but said it was "spoiled by a thin, trite storyline," indicating that "the midstream point-of-view switch doesn't help." Interzone described that "several things lift this book above most would-be fantasy blockbusters", complimenting the story pace, the prose, and the plot which the reviewer considered to be intriguing and dark. A review from Realms of Fantasy was also complimentary, noting that "Sea Dragon Heir has it all. Courtly politics, plots within plots, mystery, romance, sex, magic, monsters, and gods. But Constantine overlaps bits and pieces of this tale, turns things upside down, oftentimes confusing the reader in the best of all possible ways." The book was also reviewed in Publishers Weekly.
