= Chaz Brenchley =

British writer (born 1959)

Chaz Brenchley (born 4 January 1959 in Oxford) is a British writer of novels and short stories, associated with the genres of horror, crime and fantasy. Some of his work has been published under the pseudonyms of Ben Macallan and Daniel Fox. Chaz also serves as one of three hosts, with Jeannie Warner and John Schmidt, of the podcast Writers Drinking Coffee.

Winner of the British Fantasy Society's August Derleth Award in 1998 for Light Errant (and not, as often stated, the Outremer series), he has also published three books for children and more than 500 short stories in various genres. His time as Crimewriter-in-Residence at the St Peter's Riverside Sculpture Project in Sunderland resulted in the collection Blood Waters. Brenchley has also been writer in residence at the University of Northumbria.

Charles de Lint praised Dispossession as "one of those increasingly rare books that remind you just how satisfying fiction can be."

== Bibliography ==
=== Children's books ===
- The Thunder Sings (1988), a novel
- The Fishing Stone (1988), a picture book
- The Dragon in the Ice (1988), a collection of short stories

=== Collections ===
- Blood Waters (1996), a book of short story crime fiction
- Bitter Waters (2014), a collection of 17 short stories – Lambda Literary Award winner for Scifi/Fantasy/Horror
- Everything in All the Wrong Order (2021), a collection of roughly 32 shorts

=== Novels and novellas ===
- Time Again (1983), as Carol Trent
- The Samaritan. London: Hodder & Stoughton. 1988.
- The Refuge (1989)
- The Garden (1990, reissued by Lethe Press in 2013)
- Mall Time (1992)
- Paradise (1994)
- Shelter (1999)
- Rotten Row (2011), a novella
- Being Small (2014), a novella

==== Northern Lights ====
- Dead of Light (1995)
- Dispossession (1996)
- Light Errant (1997)

==== The Books of Outremer (split into six volumes for the US market) ====
- Book 1 – The Devil in the Dust (1998, Orbit)
- Book 2 – The Tower of the King's Daughter (1998, Orbit)
- Book 3 – A Dark Way to Glory (2000, Orbit)
- Book 4 – The Feast of the King's Shadow (2002, Orbit)
- Book 5 – The Hand of the King's Evil (2003, Orbit)
- Book 6 – The End of All Roads (2003, Ace)

==== The Selling Water by the River series ====
- Bridge of Dreams (2006, Ace Books)
- River of the World (2007, Ace)

==== The Keys to D'Esperance series ====
- The Keys to D'Esperance (1998, Subterranean Press chapbook)
- House of Doors (2011, Severn House)
- House of Bells (2012, Severn House)

==== Moshui: the Books of Stone and Water (written as Daniel Fox) ====
- Dragon in Chains (2009, Del Rey)
- Jade Man's Skin (2010, Del Rey)
- Hidden Cities (2011, Del Rey)

==== The Dæmonomicon (as Ben Macallan) ====
- Desdæmona (2011)
- Pandæmonium (2012)

=== Critical studies, reviews and biography ===
- De Lint, Charles (June 2000). "[Review of Shelter]". Books to Look For. F&SF. 98 (6): 37–38. Archived from the original on 27 December 2004.
