= The Tooth Fairy (novel) =

1996 novel by Graham Joyce

- First edition cover
- Author: Graham Joyce
- Language: English
- Genres: Fantasy, horror
- Publisher: Signet Books
- Publication date: 1996
- Publication place: United Kingdom
- Media type: Paperback
- Pages: 342
- Awards: British Fantasy Award for Best Novel (August Derleth Award); Grand prix de l'Imaginaire
- ISBN: 0-451-18435-1

The Tooth Fairy is a fantasy and horror novel by English writer Graham Joyce. It was first published in the United Kingdom in paperback in 1996 by Signet Books, and in hardcover in the United States in 1998 by Tor Books. It is about Sam and his friends growing up in Coventry, England in the 1960s, and a mischievous fairy who torments Sam.

The Tooth Fairy was generally well received by critics, and won the 1997 British Fantasy Award for Best Novel (August Derleth Award). It was also nominated for the 1998 International Horror Guild Award for Best Novel, and was placed third in the 1999 Locus Award for Best Dark Fantasy/Horror Novel.

The book was translated into French by Michel Pagel as L'intercepteur de cauchemars and published by Presses Pocket in November 1998. Another French translation, also by Pagel as La fée des dents was published by Bragelonne in March 2008. L'intercepteur de cauchemars won the Grand prix de l'Imaginaire: Traduction in 2000.

== Plot introduction ==
Five-year-old Sam loses a tooth and puts it under his pillow. That night he is visited by a sprite, which he assumes to be the tooth fairy. However, it is not the childhood myth; it is a mischievous foul-mouthed creature who taunts and teases Sam. The androgynous fairy, who changes its gender from time to time, becomes obsessed with Sam and is both hurtful to, and protective of him. Sam grows up with his friends, Clive and Terry in Coventry, England in the 1960s with the fairy visiting Sam frequently, often disrupting his life and those of his friends.

== Critical reception ==
In a review of The Tooth Fairy in the Science Fiction Chronicle, American speculative fiction critic Don D'Ammassa described the book as "unclassifiable", "totally unpredictable" and "[e]xtremely literary". He said Joyce's horror writing is "well above the average" for the genre. Canadian fantasy writer Charles de Lint called The Tooth Fairy "one of those near-perfect novels". Writing in The Magazine of Fantasy & Science Fiction, he said the fairy is "a truly original creature of the otherworld – an enigmatic being...at once terrifying and pitiable". De Lint said Joyce lays bare "all the miserable angst and profound joys of childhood", making this "utterly riveting" reading for those who want to revisit "that emotionally charged time in their lives".

A starred review in Publishers Weekly described The Tooth Fairy as an "exceptional supernatural novel". It called the sprite "a fleur de mal [flower of evil] from childhood's secret garden", but added that the book's central allure is the three boys and the "gentle wit" Joyce uses to depict their "charmingly mischievous, naive and hormone-driven" lives. A reviewer in The Washington Post stated that the "most remarkable" thing about the book is the way Joyce mixes "the horrific and the joyous and the everyday". She said it has a "pervasive sweetness and melancholy" about it, despite the recurrent calamities that befall the characters. The reviewer felt that while the book's "central weakness" is its "traditional Bildungsroman narrative", it soars at the end when Sam and the fairy free themselves of each other.

David Soyka wrote in a review at the SF Site that The Tooth Fairy is "a marvellous reminder" of the "turbulent physical and emotional transformations of adolescence". He likened the "enigmatic, sexually ambivalent" tooth fairy to "your typical boyish id". Soyka said Joyce provides "tremendous and provocative insight" into the traumas of growing up, and recommended the book, even to those who have never been a boy. In another review at the SF Site, Margo MacDonald stated that while the book is "very well written" and "evoke[s] strong and disturbing images", she did not enjoy watching the boys grow up. She said she did not like any of the characters, nor the "aura of mean-spiritedness that pervades the novel". MacDonald also found it "disappointing" that the tooth fairy has little to do with the plot and could easily have been left out of this "'coming of age' story".

Jonathan Palmer reviewed The Tooth Fairy for Arcane magazine, rating it a 10 out of 10 overall, and stated that "if you come from where I come from, you must read this book. Buy it today. I implore you. The evocation of youth is unparalleled - within the first hour, I was eight years old again, hanging around, fishing and playing football with Sam, Clive, Terry and, in later years, with Alice. It was a beautiful experience and it reminded me why I do this job."

== Awards ==
Award	Year	Result
British Fantasy Award for Best Novel (August Derleth Award)	1997	Won
International Horror Guild Award for Best Novel	1998	Shortlisted
Locus Award for Best Dark Fantasy/Horror Novel	1999	3rd place
Grand prix de l'Imaginaire: Traduction for L'intercepteur de cauchemars (French translation)	2000	Won
Grand prix de l'Imaginaire: Roman étrange for L'intercepteur de cauchemars	2000	Shortlisted

== Works cited ==
- Joyce, Graham (1996). The Tooth Fairy. Signet Books. ISBN 0-451-18435-1.
