= Storm Constantine =

British science fiction and fantasy writer (1956–2021)

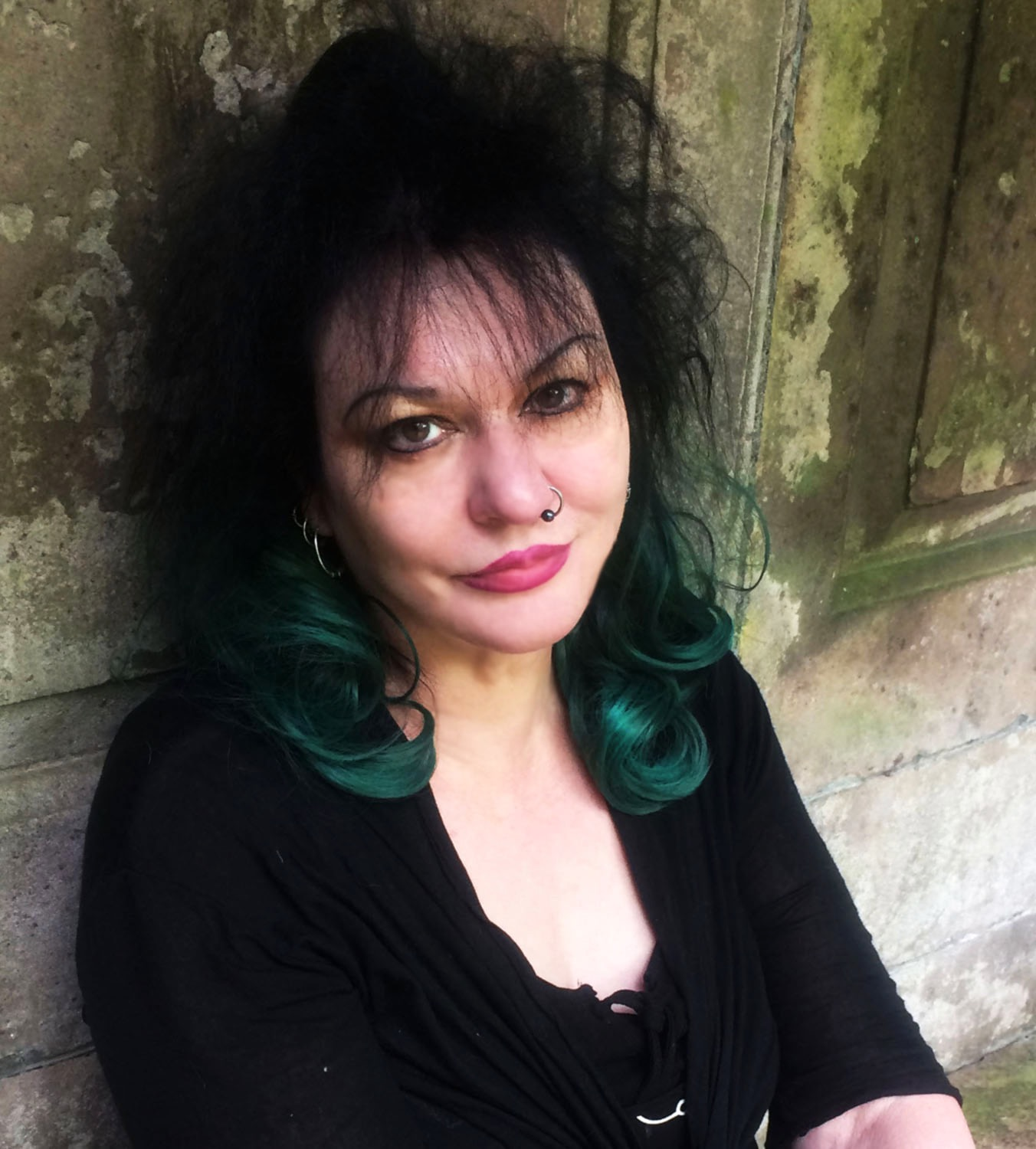
- Storm Constantine, October 2016
- Born: 12 October 1956; Stafford, England
- Died: January 14, 2021 (aged 64)
- Occupation: Author
- Spouse: Jim Hibbert
- Writing career
- Genres: Science fiction, fantasy

Storm Constantine (12 October 1956 – 14 January 2021) was a British science fiction and fantasy author, primarily known for her Wraeththu series, which began as one trilogy but has spawned many subsequent works.

Beginning in the 1980s, Constantine's short stories appeared in dozens of genre fiction magazines and anthologies. She authored over 30 published novels and non-fiction books (often examining issues of sex and gender), and numerous other publications, including grimoires. Her debut novel, The Enchantments of Flesh and Spirit, was a finalist for the Lambda Literary Award for Science Fiction, Fantasy and Horror. Subsequent work was nominated for the BSFA Award, the British Fantasy Award, the Locus Award and the Otherwise Award.

In addition to her work as a writer, Constantine headed Immanion Press, an independent publishing company she founded in 2003 to publish her own back catalogue and works by other niche writers.

== Early life ==
Constantine was born on 12 October 1956 in Stafford, Staffordshire. She began creating stories and art at an early age, devising make-believe worlds and writing sequels to Greek and Roman myths. In a 2017 interview, she said, "Before I learned to write as a young child, I made stories up in my head [...] I embellished reality always and often got into trouble for it. I simply had a natural impulse to make things up and it's been part of me all my life."

== Education and early career ==
Constantine attended Stafford Girls' High School, then attended Stafford Art College from 1971 to 1972, though she left before completing her degree, frustrated with the institution's disdain for figurative art.

In the early 1980s, she joined the Goth subculture in and around Birmingham, eventually developing friendships with several bands and eventually managing a few. She later cited her years in this scene as a strong influence for her Wraeththu series, explaining to an interviewer that the people around her "were all very androgynous" and to her "seemed like fantasy creatures".

Her primary day job was at Stafford's public library.

== Writing ==
=== Wraeththu ===
Constantine began her serious writing career by writing a novel which became the Wraeththu Chronicles and included The Enchantments of Flesh and Spirit, The Bewitchments of Love and Hate, and The Fulfillments of Fate and Desire. Working as a librarian at the time, she decided to focus on writing when she came to the following realization: "This is it for the rest of my life. I've got to do something about it." Constantine had been working with the concept and characters of Wraeththu since the late 1970s.

By the late 1980s, Constantine had a synopsis and outline of the trilogy completed. One day, she was at the Andromeda bookshop in Birmingham (operated by Rog Peyton) when she had a chance encounter with a representative from MacDonald Futura (which was absorbed by Little, Brown Book Group in 1992). The representative subsequently picked up the novels, which were published between 1987 and 1989.

The first book of the series, The Enchantments of Flesh and Spirit, was a finalist for the 1991 Lambda Literary Award for Science Fiction, Fantasy and Horror.

In 1993, Tor released the trilogy in omnibus format in the United States. The trilogy developed a cult following, particularly in the Goth subculture and among those interested in fiction tackling alternative sexuality.

Beginning with the initial trilogy, and continuing on to subsequent novels, novellas, and short stories, the Wraeththu stories follow the rise of a race of hermaphrodites / androgynes transformed from humans. This new race takes possession of a world decline, a slow apocalypse, and then rebuilds the world into something better. Members of the new species are referred to as hara. The world of Wraeththu includes representations of real-life Earth continents and cultures, but all have been renamed and reworked. Constantine described the setting as an "alternate reality".

Constantine framed the Wraeththu as follows:

Humanity is in decline, ravaged by insanity, natural disasters, conflict, disease and infertility. A mysterious new race has risen from the ghettos and ruins of the decaying, dying cities. The young are evolving into a new species, which is stronger, sharper and more beautiful than their forerunners. Androgynous beings, they transcend gender and race. They possess skin psychic abilities and the means, through a process called inception, to transform humans into creatures like themselves. But they are wild in their rebirth and must strive to overcome all that is human within them in order to create society anew. They are the Wraeththu.

The structure and plot of the Wraeththu Chronicles revolves around three characters: Pellaz ("Pell"), Swift, and Calanthe ("Cal"), who are (in that order) the first-person narrators. Their intertwining stories begin with Cal meeting Pell and whisking him away to a town where he is incepted and becomes har. Eventually the couple, deeply in love, encounter Swift, a Wraeththu child living in the home of a high-ranking tribal leader. Shortly after their visit, Pell is killed. All is not as it seems, however, and Pell is "reborn" and becomes the Tigron of Immanion, ruler the Gelaming tribe. Swift's narrative, a coming-of-age story, tells the tale of what happened after Pell and Cal left, and then what happened when Cal returned, devastated by the loss of Pell. In the third book, set a couple of decades later, Cal pieces together the shattered memories of his life and embarks on a quest to reunite with Pell, who, as he has learned, is alive. At the end of the book, Cal arrives in Immanion and claims Pell once again as his own. Pell has already bonded with another har and sired. And although the other har is angry, by the finale, the three hara become joint rulers of the Gelaming and by extension the Wraeththu race.

In subsequent works, including a trilogy intersecting with the first, several novels, and many short stories, Constantine further developed Wraeththu, in particular their evolution into fully realized, androgynous beings. After beginning their lives as rebellious teenagers and subsequently inheriting the world, they must take responsibility. In a 2016 interview, Constantine reflected:

Wraeththu are simply how the human race would be if I could design it myself: androgynous, beautiful (mostly), magical and housed in a more efficient vehicle of flesh and blood. Yet Wraeththu hara are not stainless; they are flawed. What makes them different from humanity – apart from their androgyny and improved physical/psychic being – is that they have a clean slate to start anew. Longevity helps them; humans, being frail creatures, become infirm and die just as they reach the threshold to real wisdom. Hara might have risen from a brutal start, but have a greater capacity to rise above it, to reach their potential. A world without villains and conflict, from a fictional point of view, would be pretty dull, so the mythos has to include those aspects. Wraeththu aren't perfect, but to me they are better than what came before.

As Constantine became more active in online spaces beginning in the early 2000s, she found interest in the Wraeththu stories remained high, which led her to write the Wraeththu Histories following events and characters in the Wraeththu Chronicles. The books garnered interest with publishers in the United States but not in the United Kingdom. Wanting to release the new books and revised editions of the original trilogy, Constantine founded Immanion Press in 2003, where she could publish both her own work and that of other authors.

During the 2000s and 2010s, Constantine authored and published several more Wraeththu novels, contributed and/or edited numerous short story collections, and put out several non-fiction works.

==== Fan fiction ====
With the publication of Histories and the revised Chronicles, Wraeththu fans emerged as an enthusiastic community online. Numerous web sites emerged, including an online zine and a fan fiction archive. Constantine regularly interacted directly with fans through online forums, early forms of social media, and weekly online chats. In 2003, this coalesced into Grissecon, a convention held in Stafford for fans of Wraeththu and related fiction and topics. Subsequently, Constantine participated in numerous conventions, including Lunacon and Dragon Con in the United States, plus many others in the United Kingdom.

Constantine was accepting of fan fiction, and once she began to read what her fans had written, actively encouraged it. In a 2016 interview, she expounded on her attitude:

It was brought to my attention that a small community had arisen devoted to writing Wraeththu fanfic. The main reason these writers had turned to my Mythos was because they'd been hounded out of another one by a famous writer who strongly objected to their activities. A fanfic writer mailed me about this and asked for my opinion, and what I felt about fan fiction set in a world I'd invented and about which I still continued to write. I thought about it for some time, and realized that I didn't feel offended at all. As far as I could see, it was similar to a time in my childhood when I'd also invented make-believe worlds – avidly – and the more friends I could get to share in that make-believe and play in my world, the better. This to me was the same. People were coming to play in my garden with me. Why should that be offensive? Could I ever stop people imagining these stories? No. Hadn't I myself begun my writing life as a fanfic author – albeit writing 'sequels' to Greek and Roman myths as a child rather than an established author's work? I understood the impulse to add to an invented world, to want to play in it when the author had closed the gates for the night.

She eventually used her publisher, Immanion Press, to publish novels that began as fan fiction and published fans' short stories as anthologies.

=== Other writing ===
Following the success of Wraeththu, Constantine embarked on a decade of high productivity which included the publication of two fantasy trilogies, a science fiction duet and six stand-alone novels, including Silverheart, a collaboration with Michael Moorcock. The Grigori trilogy is a modern-day fantasy tale in which characters connect back with the mysterious Nephilim, referred to in the books as Grigori. The Magravandias trilogy is a more conventional fantasy tale, with nobles, castles, medieval warfare and dragons. The Artemis duet is a science fiction tale about a colony world where radical feminism has gone disastrously wrong, with males having been made completely subservient. The remaining stand-alone novels are genre works which fall under the genres of cyberpunk, dark fantasy, and science fiction. Constantine's short stories were widely printed in genre fiction magazines, which during the decade were thriving, and in larger print anthologies. With the publication of so many novels and stories, Constantine's cult following grew, and she began to appear at many science fiction and fantasy conventions in the United Kingdom as well as Dragon Con in the United States.

During this time period, Constantine also founded a fiction magazine with Jamie Spracklen, called Visionary Tongue, through which she published fiction by Freda Warrington, Graham Joyce, and Tanith Lee.

== Immanion Press ==
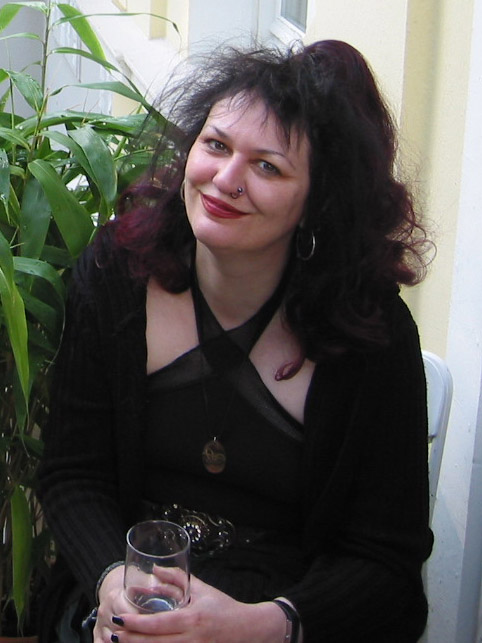
Storm Constantine, photographed in Bonn, Germany, where in 2005 she was the guest of honour at Feencon.

Constantine founded Immanion Press in 2003, an option that became commercially viable with the arrival of affordable and efficient print-on-demand services. She published her own works, as well as fiction and non-fiction texts from other authors. In addition to standalone books, Immanion Press published a series of Wraeththu short story anthologies featuring her own work as well as those of fan writers. The initial collection was published in 2010, and within ten years, it had been joined by five others.

Although the company attracted several prominent authors, including Tanith Lee and David Barnett, for the most part, the fiction side of the house lost money. After a few years, Constantine opted to focus more on esoteric non-fiction, covering such topics as paganism, magic, myth and mythology and Reiki.

In addition to writing more Wraeththu books, Constantine was primary editor for many books Immanion Press published. She laid out many books, including her own, for publication, formatting text, setting up artwork, and preparing the final file to be sent to the printer.

== Personal life and death ==
In the late 1980s, Constantine began using the name Storm Constantine as a pen name and eventually changed her name legally. When asked about her name in a 2010 interview, she said, "I feel that as people grow up, they don't always fit the names they've been given by their parents. So I decided quite early on that I wanted a different name. I chose one I felt would give me assertiveness and confidence."

Constantine lived in Stafford her entire life and was married to Jim Hibbert. They lived in a Victorian terrace house they restored and shared their lives with a menagerie of cats.

Constantine died aged 64 on 14 January 2021 following a long illness.

== Publications ==
=== Wraeththu ===
==== Wraeththu Chronicles ====
===== Individual volumes =====
1. The Enchantments of Flesh and Spirit (1987; German translation published by Zauberfeder Verlag in 2006, revised edition published by Immanion Press, 2003)
2. The Bewitchments of Love and Hate (1988; revised edition published by Immanion Press, 2007)
3. The Fulfilments of Fate and Desire (1989; revised edition published by Immanion Press, 2018)

===== Omnibus =====
- Wraeththu (1993)

==== Wraeththu Histories ====
1. The Wraiths of Will and Pleasure (2003)
2. The Shades of Time and Memory (2004)
3. The Ghosts of Blood and Innocence (2005)

==== Alba Sulh sequence ====
1. The Hienama: A Story of the Sulh (2005)
2. Student of Kyme (2008)
3. The Moonshawl (2014)

==== Short fiction collections ====
- Blood, the Phoenix and a Rose: An Alchymical Triptych (2016)
- A Raven Bound with Lilies: Stories of the Wraeththu Mythos (2017)

==== Grimoire Dehara ====
- Grimoire Dehara: Kaimana (2011, with Gabriel Strange, illustrated by Olga Bosserdt)
- Grimoire Dehara: Ulani (2016, with Taylor Ellwood)
- Grimoire Dehara: Nahir Nuri (2017, with Taylor Ellwood)

Works outlining the practice of ritual magic based on the Wraeththu world.

==== Misc. ====
- Wraeththu: From Enchantment to Fulfilment (tabletop role-playing game) (with Gabriel Strange and Lydia Wood, 2005)
- Wraeththu: The Picture Book (photography based on Wraeththu books) (2007)

=== Artemis ===
- The Monstrous Regiment (1991)
- Aleph (1991)

=== Grigori Trilogy ===
- Stalking Tender Prey (1995)
- Scenting Hallowed Blood (1996)
- Stealing Sacred Fire (1997)

=== Magravandias ===
==== Novels ====
1. Sea Dragon Heir (1998)
2. The Crown of Silence (2000)
3. The Way of Light (2001)

==== Novella ====
- "The Thorn Boy" (1999)

=== Standalone novels ===
- Hermetech (1991)
- Burying the Shadow (1992)
- Sign for the Sacred (1993)
- Calenture (1994)
- Thin Air (1999)
- Silverheart (with Michael Moorcock) (2000)
- Breathe, My Shadow (2019)

=== Collections ===
- Three Heralds of the Storm (chapbook, 1997)
- The Oracle Lips (1999)
- Mythophidia (2008)
- Mythangelus (2009)
- Mytholumina (2010)
- Mythanimus (2011)
- Splinters of Truth (2016)
- Mythumbra (2018)
- A Raven Bound with Lilies: Stories of the Wraeththu Mythos (2017)

==== Anthologies edited by ====
- Paragenesis: Stories of the Dawn of Wraeththu (2010) (with Wendy Darling)
- Para Imminence: Stories of the Future of Wraeththu (2012) (with Wendy Darling)
- Para Kindred: Enigmas of Wraeththu (2014) (with Wendy Darling)
- Night's Nieces: The Legacy of Tanith Lee (2015)
- Dark in the Day (2016) (with Paul Houghton)
- Para Animalia: Creatures of Wraeththu (2016) (with Wendy Darling)
- The Darkest Midnight in December: Ghost Stories for the Winter Season (2017)
- Songs to Earth and Sky: Stories of the Seasons (2017)
- Para Spectral: Hauntings of Wraeththu (2018) (with Wendy Darling)
- Para Mort: Wraeththu Tales of Love and Death (2020) (with Wendy Darling)

==== Contributor ====
List of anthologies in which Constantine's works have appeared.

- Digital Dreams (1990)
- Dante's Disciples (1991)
- Women of Wonder, the Contemporary Years: Science Fiction by Women from the 1970s to the 1990s (1995)
- The Crow: Shattered Lives and Broken Dreams (1999)
- The Year's Best Fantasy and Horror (2001)
- Lacrymata: Deathwing, A Warhammer 40,000 anthology (1990)
- The Mammoth Book of Vampire Stories by Women (2001)
- Ravens in the Library: Magic in the Bard's Name (2009)
- Magic: An Anthology of the Esoteric and Arcane (2012)
- Obsession: Tales of Irresistible Desire (2012)
- Blood Sisters: Vampire Stories by Women (audiobook, 2015)
- Dreams from the Witch House: Female Voices of Lovecraftian Horror (2016)
- Sirens and Other Daemon Lovers: Magical Tales of Love and Seduction (2002)
- Black Thorn, White Rose (2007)

=== Non-fiction books ===
- The Inward Revolution (with Deborah Benstead) (1998)
- Bast and Sekhmet: Eyes of Ra (with Elouise Coquio) (1999)
- Egyptian Birth Signs: The Secrets of the Ancient Egyptian Horoscope (2002)
- Sekhem Heka: A Natural Healing and Self Development System (2008)
- What a Long Strange Trip It's Been: Wilderness Tips for World of Warcraft (2011)
- Whatnots & Curios: A Selection of Articles and Reviews (2015)
- SHE: Primal Meetings with the Dark Goddess (2019) (with Andrew Collins)

=== Grimoires ===
- Coming Forth By Day: A System of Khematic Magic (2019)
