= The Dark Age (series) =

Novel trilogy by Mark Chadbourn

The trilogy (U.K versions), in order of publication from left to right.

The Dark Age is a trilogy by Mark Chadbourn set around the beginning of the third millennium. While the previous series was a clear fantasy story, this has strings of gothic horror and existentialism woven into it.

The three books are:

- The Devil in Green (2002)
- The Queen of Sinister (2004)
- The Hounds of Avalon (2005)

Although not a direct sequel to The Age of Misrule, it is a continuation of the world established by the end of this trilogy, the events of which are referred to as the Fall. It is followed by the Kingdom of the Serpent.

At first the books appear to be standalone novels, however ultimately they weave together to form one larger story, as sub-plots and themes coalesce in the final book, and only by reading that can you see how it all holds together. They do not need to be read in order of publication, although The Hounds of Avalon does bring together the characters from the other two and is set after the events of The Queen of Sinister and The Devil in Green.

This trilogy fits into a much bigger jigsaw, a sprawling story that covers two thousand years of history, multiple mythologies and two worlds, through The Age of Misrule and the Kingdom of the Serpent - again, the stories stand separately but a greater perception comes from reading all.

The Devil in Green has been described as "a sumptuous feast of fairytale, magic, dark gothic horror and romance."

All through his books Chadbourn buries archetypes, specifically those of Jung, to get across his ideas and tap into the subconscious. He has the Hero, the Great Mother, the Wise old man, the Trickster and the Child subtly underpinning his characters. But he makes sure his characters are real and flawed. His heroes are not stereotypical high born achievers but ordinary individuals from normal or hard backgrounds.

When interviewed about this series he has said:

I've studied and read about archetypes for years. .. Jung.. believed they were elemental forces that we tapped into and we could control them, or maybe they controlled us. In a way, they are the elemental spirits and spiritual beliefs some religions have at their core. ..Stories force you to look at what is really important in life what it is to be a human being in the modern world. To consider, on a very basic level, the differences between good and evil and the reasons why human values are important. To consider why you're doing what you're doing, to look at the subtext of life, to consider life as a story and rather than just see the surface, to look at the meaning beneath. I've kept this in mind throughout all my books

— Mark Chadbourn

== Plot introduction and setting ==
The trilogy is set in Britain and the Otherworld or Far Lands. Technology is failing and magic has returned along with armies of mythical creatures, and Faerie folk from the Otherworld. Everyday people face the hardships of living in a world with little law and order, poor communications and a Government that is struggling to maintain power. Travelling is fraught with danger of attack from creatures and monsters from the Otherworld. Within the cities gang rule is taking place and it is never safe to venture out after dark.

Mark Chadbourn uses the gods of Celtic mythology referred to as the Tuatha Dé Danann within his books and the idea that Ley lines and ancient sites such as Stone Henge are connections to, and areas of, the Earth's energy which he calls the Blue Fire. The ancient sites act as gateways to the Otherworld. He draws on the theories of Brane cosmology to create a multiverse, where time in one dimension moves at a different rate from another; one hour in our world could be days or weeks in another.

== Plot summary ==
=== The Devil in Green ===
The Devil in Green centres around Mallory, a recently recruited Knights Templar based at Salisbury Cathedral, his comrades and his relationship with a new age traveller/Wicca called Sophie. The Knights Templar and the remnants of the Christian Church are trying to restore some form of order within the sphere of their world.

During a mission to rescue a vicar, Mallory finds himself in one of the courts of the Otherworld where he learns of his destiny as a Brother of Dragons; one of 5 chosen by Existence to help restore the balance of light vs. dark in our world. He returns to Salisbury to discover supernatural forces have surrounded the Cathedral laying it to siege. The priests become more fundamentalist after their leader is killed mysteriously and a sacred artefact with alleged powers is recovered.

It falls to Mallory, with the help of Sophie to end the siege and overthrow the fundamentalist priests. During the siege his friend, Miller, is nearly crucified but saved when Cernunnos places a fabulous beast hatchling within him, infusing him with the Blue Fire. This leaves Miller with the ability to heal the sick. The story concludes with Mallory and Sophie heading off in search of their fellow Brothers and Sisters of Dragons.

The title refers to Cernunnos: although he is worshipped by the pagans as a nature god and part of life, the Christians portray him as the Devil; hence, 'the Devil in Green'

=== The Queen of Sinister ===
An incurable plague is sweeping the country. Caitlin Shepherd, a local GP, is working all the hours to do what she can in her community. Caitlin's husband and young son succumb and die. Overcome by grief, Caitlin thinks she cannot continue, but is helped by her friend, Mary the local herbalist. Mary is visited by an old Professor named Crowther, who says Caitlin is a Sister of Dragons, and that she must find a cure for the plague in the Otherworld. Caitlin goes with Crowther, meeting up with three others; Mahalia, a teenage girl, Carlton, a mute boy, and lastly, Matt, who is looking for his missing daughter.

Whilst in the court of Lugh in the Otherworld they rescue Jack, a teenager from our world, who was taken as a baby by the Tuatha Dé Danann during The Age of Misrule He has had placed within him a powerful weapon known as a Wish Hex.

Caitlin is suffering from multiple personality disorder. Inside her mind are also Briony, Brigid, Amy, and a fourth persona that the others are terrified of. As Caitlin's group continue on their quest, Mary discovers that Caitlin is in danger, and sets off to help her. On the group’s journey to the House of Pain, the source of the plague, they are attacked and Caitlin is thrown back into our world, ending up in Birmingham

Here we meet Thackery and Harvey, struggling to survive against the local gang who are killing plague victims. Life is bleak within the city and little hope remains. Thackery finds and takes care of Caitlin, who has retreated into herself and is non-communicative.

Thackery is captured by the gang but rescued by Caitlin whose hidden persona emerges as The Morrigan. Caitlin, as The Morrigan, continues to the House of Pain. Once there she is given a choice to remain as its queen, with her son, in exchange for giving up being a Sister of Dragons, the fight for Existence and a cure for the plague.

Meanwhile, Mary’s quest reaches its conclusion and she must confront her past in order to help save Caitlin. This she achieves, the plague is stopped and the story concludes with Mahalia, Jack and Crowther heading off into the Otherworld, Caitlin no longer tied to the House of Pain, but also no longer a Sister of Dragons nor the Morrigan's host. Her son is now free to pass on to the Afterlife with her husband. Thackery and Harvey follow her to the House of Pain and leave it with her.

The title of the book is the position Caitlin is offered in her deal to save her son

=== The Hounds of Avalon ===
This story is set mainly in Oxford where the Government is trying to restore law and order after the Fall. Hunter, a Government special forces agent and his friend Hal, a Government office clerk are the central characters who find themselves Brothers of Dragons up against a dark power, The Void which wants to stamp out all of Existence. The Government want to round up the Brothers and Sisters of Dragons for their own end and this leads Hunter to capture Mallory and gets Sophie Shot. Believing her dead Mallory escapes with Hunter to seek out the remaining original Brothers and Sisters of Dragons.

Hal keeps his identity as a Brother of Dragons secret but goes on his own mission to find out what he can to help the fight against the Void. He has several encounters with creatures from the Otherworld.

Sophie is not dead but ends up in the Far Lands where she joins Caitlin Shepherd, no longer a Sister of Dragons. Caitlin regains the Morrigan and the two help Lugh and his court escape a siege before returning to Oxford.

During the final battle against the Void's army, Hal is accused of killing the Prime Minister. This is a ruse by the Government to get all the Brothers and Sisters together in order to sacrifice them to The Void. The Government want law and order restored and see the unpredictability that magic, and the Brothers and Sisters of Dragons offer as a threat to this. The Void regains control, people return to their mundane ordinary lives and the world has reverted to how it was before The Age of Misrule

Hal escapes The Void and enters the Blue Fire to travel through time and set in motion events to bring back the original leader of the Brothers and Sisters of Dragons, Jack Churchill, as Existence's last hope in the battle with the Void.

The title of the book refers to The Hounds of Avalon, who once heard baying indicate the end of the world

== Characters in "The Dark Age Trilogy" ==
Brothers and Sisters of Dragons:

- Mallory is the first Brother of Dragons during the Dark Age. A cynical man, he was once a student of the Classics. The Tuatha call him the Dead Man, on account of him killing himself in another dimension and awakening in ours. His past troubles him and he resents authority.
- Sophie Tallant is a priestess for a group called the New Celtic Nation, and becomes close to Mallory. She practises her craft and is able to visit Mallory in his dreams. She has strong beliefs and will stand up for them.
- Caitlin Shepherd is a country GP. The death of her husband and son fracture her mind and she struggles to keep control of her multiple personalities. The Tuatha call her the Broken Woman.
- Hunter is a Special Ops field leader for the remains of the SBS. He is tough, sharp talking, and a bit of a ladies man. He appears to take his brutal work in his stride but in reality remembers all the faces of those he has killed. His best friend is Hal.
- Hal is a silent office-drone in the reconstituted British government. Withdrawn, his role in the coming conflict is discovered at the very end. He is full of self-doubt, but is good at problem solving. The Tuatha call him the Shadow Mage.

Other important humans:

- Jez Miller is Mallory's main friend in the Knights Templar. He joined because he believes in their cause and faith. He is naive and sees the good in everyone.
- Mary is an old witch/herbalist who knows Caitlin. Self-loathing and alcoholic, she sees Caitlin as a daughter and makes her own sacrifice to bring the Goddess(the sacred feminine) back to the world.
- Jack a teenager who has spent most of his life a prisoner of the Tuatha Dé Danann and been subjected to various experiments. He helps Caitlin and company escape from Lugh's court after they release him from his cell.

Celtic gods (the Tuatha Dé Danann) and Courts:

- Cernunnos one of the most powerful gods, appears in Devil in Green to aid Mallory and again in the Hounds of Avalon. His other half is the triple goddess. He leads the Wild Hunt, who once called cannot be stopped until a kill has been made
- The triple Goddess or Mother, maiden crone, is searched for in Queen of Sinister and one of her aspects, the Morrigan is key to Caitlin's survival.
- Rhiannon is queen of the Court of Peaceful Days. Mallory ends up there after being attacked on Salisbury Plain. Though this court has renounced violence, Rhiannon gives Mallory the sword of Llyrwyn
- Lugh rules the Court of Soul's Ease. His court is the first Caitlin enters in the Queen of Sinister. Initially he is diminished because he no longer fights for Existence, but this changes and he fights in the final battle in the Hounds of Avalon.
- Dian Cecht rules the court of The Final Word. Here experiments on humans are carried out and this is where Jack spent much of his life. Dian Cecht is the great healer of the Tuatha. Like a lot of the Tuatha he can appear cold and aloof but is fascinated by humans or Fragile Creatures as the Tuatha refer to them
- Math lives in a tower in the court of Soul's Ease. He wears a mask of four different animals: a boar, a falcon, a salmon and a bear. Caitlin and Sophie approach him for aid in Hounds of Avalon.

== Major themes ==
General themes of the trilogy are the core issues of our own Dark Ages - faith, plague/illness, war/politics. The books strip away the trappings of modern society to see how we would cope against the great challenges of life without our support network.

The books look at the fallibility of human nature, and at what can happen when different beliefs clash. They also question the wisdom of those who seek power attaining it.

The idea of an Afterlife is also included.

== Awards and nominations ==
All were shortlisted for the British Fantasy Society's August Derleth Award for Best Novel - the first time three books from a trilogy have been shortlisted

== Publication history ==
- The Devil In Green (The Dark Age book I) Gollancz (UK) October 2002 ISBN 0-575-07402-7
- The Queen of Sinister (The Dark Age book II) Gollancz (UK) March 2004 ISBN 0-575-07653-4
- The Hounds of Avalon (The Dark Age book III) Gollancz (UK) April 2005 ISBN 0-575-07772-7

== Sources, references, external links, reviews ==
- An interview with Mark Chadbourn on the subject of his work
- Chadbourn's website
- The SF Site Reviews
- Buy Mark Chadbourn's books at Amazon
