= After Silence =

Book by Jonathan Carroll

- First edition (UK)
- Author: Jonathan Carroll
- Cover artist: Dave McKean
- Language: English
- Published: April 1992 (UK); April 1993 (US)
- Publisher: MacDonald & Co (UK); Doubleday (US)
- Publication place: United States
- Pages: 240
- ISBN: 0385473516

After Silence is the eighth novel by the American writer Jonathan Carroll, published in 1992. It tells the story of a successful cartoonist, the protagonist Max Fischer, who fell in love with a woman. Later he discovers many secrets, including a terrifying crime, about the woman and is confused about what to do.

Reviews of the novel are mixed. LA Times Reviewer Susan Heeger, thought the plot had a strong design, but was not expertly told: "Carroll's book doesn't rise above the level of an intriguing cautionary tale over-directed by someone anxious to get his point across." Publishers Weekly had a much more positive review, writing that the novel is "An electrifying, unforgettable novel that unfolds with the logic of a Greek tragedy, Carroll's parable on moral cowardice [has an] uncompromising honesty about how secrets gnaw and kill." The London Review of Books describes the novel as representing the American "everyday" with "delicate descriptions".
