= The Silent Land =

2010 novel by Graham Joyce

- First edition cover
- Author: Graham Joyce
- Language: English
- Genre: Horror fantasy
- Publisher: Gollancz
- Publication date: November 2010
- Publication place: United Kingdom
- Media type: Hardback
- Pages: 248
- ISBN: 978-0-575-08389-9

The Silent Land is a horror fantasy novel by English writer Graham Joyce. It was first published in the United Kingdom in November 2010 by Victor Gollancz Ltd, and in March 2011 in the United States by Doubleday. It is about a young married couple who are buried by an avalanche while skiing in the French Pyrenees. They free themselves, but find the world around them silent and devoid of people.

The Silent Land was generally well received by critics. It was nominated for the 2011 World Fantasy Award for Best Novel, the British Fantasy Award for Best Novel (August Derleth Award), and the Shirley Jackson Award. The book was translated into French by Louise Malagoli as Au cœur du silence, and published in February 2016 by Éditions Gallimard.

== Plot introduction ==
Jake and Zoe, a young married couple, are buried by an avalanche while skiing near the fictional ski resort town of Saint-Bernard-en-Haut in the French Pyrenees. They manage to free themselves and return to the town, but find it silent and deserted. They assume it has been evacuated because of the avalanche, but are soon disturbed by strange observations. Time appears to have stopped: candles do not burn down, food in the hotel kitchen remains fresh. They also find they cannot leave the town or communicate with the outside world. The couple deduces that they died in the avalanche and are stuck on their own in an afterlife.

== Critical reception ==
In a review of The Silent Land in The Independent, British writer and critic Roz Kaveney called Joyce's "near-perfect novella ... a tour de force". She said it is "a study in classic supernatural fiction" that is "perfectly paced" and told with "clarity" and "precision". Kaveney stated that "Joyce writes about moments of spiritual insight with a novelist's eye for the shape of moments and a poet's sense of how they feel." American author and critic Jeff VanderMeer also called The Silent Land a "tour de force". Writing in The Washington Post, he said Joyce's blending of "the bizarre and the personal" is reminiscent of the works of English novelist Ian McEwan and Japanese writer Haruki Murakami. VanderMeer said the book is all about memory, and he praised the way Joyce weaves this into the story.

Reviewing The Silent Land in the Los Angeles Times, Chris Barton described the book as "quietly creepy". He said parts of it are reminiscent of the 1998 film What Dreams May Come, and Zoe and Jake's hotel reminded him of The Shining's Overlook Hotel by Stephen King. Barton felt that while Joyce's story tends to be a little "over the top" in places, and full of clichés and metaphors, it is told "with enough heartfelt panache to ensure its mystery". British journalist Alyson Rudd was a little more critical. In a review in The Times he stated that the book "lacks the depth" to be termed magic realism, and called it "cookie-cutter stuff with paint-by-numbers descriptions". He also felt that Zoe and Jake were not developed enough to be called "real characters". But Rudd added that where the book excels is in the way Joyce tells the story, and the suspense he creates, leaving the reader "relatively satisfied by the ending."

== Award nominations ==
Award	Year	Result
British Fantasy Award for Best Novel (August Derleth Award)	2011	Nominated
World Fantasy Award for Best Novel	2011	Nominated
Shirley Jackson Award	2011	Nominated

== Works cited ==
- Joyce, Graham (2010). The Silent Land. Gollancz Books. ISBN 978-0-575-08389-9.
