= The Facts of Life (Joyce novel) =

2002 novel by Graham Joyce

- First edition cover
- Author: Graham Joyce
- Language: English
- Genre: Historical fantasy
- Publisher: Gollancz
- Publication date: December 2002
- Publication place: United Kingdom
- Media type: Hardback
- Pages: 263
- Awards: World Fantasy Award for Best Novel; Grand prix de l'Imaginaire
- ISBN: 0-575-07230-X

The Facts of Life is a historical fantasy novel by English writer Graham Joyce. It was first published in the United Kingdom in December 2002 by Victor Gollancz Ltd, and in June 2003 in the United States by the Atria Publishing Group. It is set in Coventry, England after the end of World War II, with flashbacks to the Coventry Blitz when the Luftwaffe bombed the city on 14 November 1940.

The Facts of Life was generally well received by critics. It won the 2003 World Fantasy Award for Best Novel, and was shortlisted for the 2003 British Fantasy Award for Best Novel (August Derleth Award). The book was translated into Spanish, Portuguese, Italian and French, with the French translation (Lignes de vie) by Mélanie Fazi winning the 2007 Grand prix de l'Imaginaire, in the Traduction and Roman étrange categories.

Joyce said his research for the chapter on the Coventry Blitz was assisted by interviews he conducted with eye witness accounts. This chapter was also published as a free-standing novelette entitled "The Coventry Boy" in the Autumn 2002 issue of the British horror magazine The 3rd Alternative. The novelette was one of the preliminary nominees for the 2002 Bram Stoker Award for Superior Achievement in Long Fiction.

== Plot introduction ==
The Facts of Life takes place in Coventry, England immediately after World War II, and is about the Vine family, comprising Martha Vine and her seven daughters. Martha is visited by ghosts, and her youngest daughter, Cassie is clairvoyant. Cassie has a baby, Frank, from a liaison she had with a soldier during the war. Frank also has psychic abilities inherited from her mother and grandmother. Because Cassie is wayward and fey, Martha delegates Cassie's six sisters with the task of bringing up Frank. The story tracks the first ten years of Frank's life, and the Vine family who take care for him.

In a flashback to the war, sixteen-year-old Cassie foresees the Coventry Blitz. On the night of 14 November 1940, as the Luftwaffe firebomb the city, Cassie wanders its streets amid the inferno and destruction, conversing with living and dead individuals. At one point she climbs to the top of the Coventry Cathedral tower and connects with one of the German bomber pilots. She makes him fly his plane out of formation, where it is easily shot down by British anti-aircraft guns.

== Critical reception ==
In a review on SF Site, Gabe Mesa described The Facts of Life as "a deceptively gentle masterpiece of magical realism". He said it is an appealing mix of social commentary, humour, history and fantasy, and called it "among the best of recent English language novels in the magical realist vein." Mesa added that the chapter on the Coventry Blitz "may be the single most affecting piece of writing Graham Joyce has written to date".

A review at Publishers Weekly stated that The Facts of Life "celebrates the strong bond of family and the deep well of sensitivity on which they all draw". It said the book is "[w]arm with nostalgia and flecked with … subtle fantasy" that makes the paranormal appear "entirely credible". In a review in Booklist, Brendan Dowing said Joyce "skirts sentimentality" and examines all sides of the close-knit Vine family to produce "[a] beautifully written" and "moving" story of family drama and magic realism.

British novelist Christopher Priest wrote in an obituary for Joyce in The Guardian that The Facts of Life is often regarded as Joyce's best novel. Priest said the book's "quality of writing, the detail and insight into the social background" has all the makings of literary fiction, but the fantasy elements resulted in it being labelled a genre novel. In The Washington Post Zofia Smardz described The Facts of Life as "an astute portrait of England pulling itself together after the devastation of World War II". She called the "haunting, dreamlike memory sequence" that Joyce uses to describe the Coventry Blitz as "the book's centerpiece". Smardz said the novel is also about family, the "warm, sweet evocation of the kind of hearth most of us hurry from, then spend our lives hankering after".

Reviewing the book in the Library Journal, Christine Perkins felt that Joyce was "less success[ful]" with this historical novel than with his dark fantasies. She said that while the "vivid description" of the Blitz almost "carr[ies] the novel", the subplots concerning Frank's upbringing in the various households "bogs [the story] down". Perkins opined that it could have been "a more focused, magical, gripping tale" if some of the sisters had been left out. Paul Bateman also had mixed feelings about the novel. In a review in the British Science Fiction Association magazine, Vector, he called The Facts of Life "an accomplished study of a working class family in post-war Britain", and the images of Cassie's "unusual escapades" during the Blitz, "brilliant". But Bateman felt that some of the story's episodes are not covered in enough detail, and that the book's supernatural elements are a little "too subtle" for him.

== Awards and nominations ==
Year	Award	Result	Ref
2003	British Fantasy Award for Best Novel (August Derleth Award)	Shortlisted	
2003	World Fantasy Award for Best Novel	Won	
2007	Grand prix de l'Imaginaire: Traduction for Lignes de vie (French translation)	Won	
2007	Grand prix de l'Imaginaire: Roman étrange for Lignes de vie	Won	

== Works cited ==
- Joyce, Graham (2002). The Facts of Life. Gollancz Books. ISBN 0-575-07230-X.
