= Glass Soup =

2006 novel by Jonathan Carroll

- Author: Jonathan Carroll
- Language: English
- Published: November 28, 2006 Tor Books
- Publication place: United States
- Pages: 320
- ISBN: 0765311801

Glass Soup is a surreal fiction novel written by the American writer Jonathan Carroll, first published in 2006. It tells the story of a group of people who live in Vienna. They find out that they are caught in a battle of Gods and Chaos. This fiction consists many elements of Judeo-Christian-Islamic mythology and popular culture mythos. It is a blend of real and unreal, living and dead, and good and evil.
