= Some Kind of Fairy Tale =

2012 novel by Graham Joyce

- First edition (UK)
- Author: Graham Joyce
- Cover artist: Nick Castle
- Language: English
- Subject: Missing persons
- Genre: Speculative fiction
- Publisher: Gollancz (UK); Doubleday (US)
- Publication date: June 2012
- Publication place: United Kingdom
- Media type: Book, Kindle
- Pages: 320
- Awards: Robert Holdstock Award
- ISBN: 9780385535786
- OCLC: 778591883

Some Kind of Fairy Tale is a 2012 novel by the British author Graham Joyce. A work of speculative fiction, it won the British Fantasy Society's Fantasy Novel of the Year award (the Robert Holdstock Award) in 2013, and was nominated for the 2013 British Fantasy Award for Best Horror Novel (August Derleth Award), and the 2013 World Fantasy Award for best Novel.

A limited 1,500 copy first edition of the book was published in June 2012. It was signed by Joyce, and included one of his short stories, "The Oversoul", first published in 2008. Some Kind of Fairy Tale was later translated into French by Louise Malagoli and published as Comme un conte in France in February 2015.

== Main characters ==
- Tara Martin, a teenage girl who disappears for 20 years and subsequently returns to her family;
- Hiero, a stranger, supposedly from an alternative reality populated by fairies;
- Peter Martin, Tara's older brother;
- Richie Franklin, Tara's former lover;
- Dr. Underwood, Tara's psychiatrist; and
- Mrs. Larwood, an elderly woman who counsels Tara.

Certain characters' names have significance to the plot. Tara's name acknowledges the story's linkage with Irish folkloric tales of fairy abduction; The Hill of Tara is the traditional seat of the High Kings of Ireland. Hiero's name is pronounced "yarrow", which is a flowering plant with healing properties and also the name of certain rural locations in England and Scotland, signifying the character's affinity with nature and the land.

== Plot summary ==
The novel takes place in Leicestershire, England in current times. Tara disappears after meeting a stranger, Hiero, in Charnwood Forest. After a long absence, she returns to her parents on Christmas Day. She claims she had been trapped in a parallel reality populated by fairies. Tara believes she was missing for only six months, yet her family knows she has been gone for 20 years. During her absence Tara has barely aged at all, still resembling a 15-year-old girl. But her parents have become elderly and feeble, her brother Peter has become a husband and father, and her boyfriend Richie has led a life of underachievement and substance abuse, unable to recover from Tara's disappearance. Tara's family refuses to accept her explanation for her disappearance. Nevertheless, Tara insists it is true. The family employs Dr. Underwood to assess Tara's sanity. The psychiatrist concludes she has unconsciously fabricated her story as a defense mechanism to avoid confronting some trauma that must have occurred during the period of her absence.

Tara becomes increasingly dissatisfied with life with her parents and boyfriend, finding it pales in comparison to her supposed experiences in the parallel world. Her neighbor, Mrs. Larwood, claims to have had the same experience, and warns her of the dangers involved in moving between the two worlds.

Richie is attacked twice by an unknown assailant, and is later stricken with brain cancer. Tara believes that this is the work of Hiero, who followed her back to the human world and threatened to "blast" Richie's mind. At the novel's conclusion Tara once again disappears, leaving a note for Richie indicating that her departure was voluntary, and done in an effort to protect him from Hiero's revenge. Richie discovers that his cancer has miraculously disappeared.

== Reception ==
In a review in The Washington Post, Anna Mundow wrote that Some Kind of Fairy Tale is about the "dark and dangerous collision" between our reality and the fairy realm. She said it draws on the timeless myths of mortals being abducted by fairies. Mundow described Joyce's "charming" drama as a little "overwrought" at times, but added that his "other world" is "astonishingly beautiful [and] disturbing", and just as tangible as the mortal world.

Regina Marler called the novel "ravishing". In a review of the book in The New York Times, she stated that Joyce's writing is "enthralling, agile and effortless", and said that while he builds on English folklore, "Joyce has clearly gone beyond book-learning and made the 'crossing at twilight' to the fairy kingdom himself." Kirkus Reviews described the book as "excellently done; expertly grounded, suspensefully told", but had reservations about Joyce's depiction of Faerie. The review said its inhabitants resemble "promiscuous hippies [with] a bloodlust for gladiatorial combat". The reviewer found Hiero's switch from kind benefactor to aggressive stalker "especially jarring".

Reviewing the novel in The Guardian, American literary critic Jeff VanderMeer said "Joyce's fiction has always displayed a certain generosity of spirit that lifts it above the ordinary. This generosity is not at all sentimental, but is alive with sentiment and an appreciation for the mysteries of life." VanderMeer described the first part of Some Kind of Fairy Tale as "mesmerising", but felt that towards the end it tends to become somewhat "mundane". He said that while Joyce delves into fairy myths, he does not go beyond them and produce something new, something "to surprise, to provoke, to challenge in some way."
