= Memoirs of a Master Forger =

2008 novel by William Heaney

- First edition cover
- Author: William Heaney
- Language: English
- Genre: Fantasy
- Publisher: Gollancz
- Publication date: October 2008
- Publication place: United Kingdom
- Media type: Hardback
- Pages: 280
- Awards: British Fantasy Award for Best Novel (August Derleth Award)
- ISBN: 978-0-575-08297-7

Memoirs of a Master Forger is a fantasy novel by William Heaney, a pseudonym of English writer Graham Joyce. (Note: The pseudonym William Heaney is also the book's narrator.) It is about a book forger and demonologist. The novel was first published in the United Kingdom in October 2008 by Victor Gollancz Ltd, and in the United States as How to Make Friends with Demons, credited to Graham Joyce, in November 2009 by Night Shade Books. (Note: How to Make Friends with Demons is the title of a book William Heaney wrote in Memoirs of a Master Forger.) The book was translated into French by Mélanie Fazi and published as Mémoires d'un maître faussaire in France in February 2009.

Memoirs of a Master Forger won the 2009 British Fantasy Award for Best Novel (August Derleth Award), selected by members of the British Fantasy Society. Joyce's 2007 short story, "An Ordinary Soldier of the Queen", which won the 2009 O. Henry Award Juror Favorites, was incorporated into Memoirs of a Master Forger.

== Plot introduction ==
William Heaney works at a British social welfare agency, and, in his spare time, forges 19th-century first edition books. He is also haunted by an ability to see demons, demons that feed on people with problems, the mentally ill, and the guilt-ridden. To appease them, Heaney donates all the money he makes from his forgeries to GoPoint, a homeless shelter.

Heaney first encountered demons at college when he found an old, damaged book on the occult. Hoping to make some money, Heaney began to create a replica of the book. Where pages in the original were missing, he made up text and spells. He knew it was complete nonsense, but was sure it would pass as a rare collectable. After a while, he lost interest in the project and shelved it. Then Heaney discovered that a fellow student, Charles Fraser had been practising black magic using Heaney's fake manuscript as a source. The spells were made up, yet they worked and summoned demons. Later Heaney discovered that Fraser had published his book, without his permission, in a book of his own entitled How to Make Friends with Demons.

The incident at collage changed Heaney and he deteriorated, becoming depressed and turning to alcohol. Heaney meets Seamus, a disturbed Desert Storm veteran who gives Heaney his journal, in which he describes the demons haunting him in great detail. It is Seamus's ramblings that enable Heaney to better understand demons and to come to terms with them.

== Background ==
The idea to publish Memoirs of a Master Forger under the pseudonym of William Heaney, who is also the book's narrator, came from Joyce's editor at Gollancz Books. Joyce liked the suggestion because he said the book is about "forged manuscripts, faked personalities and literary hoaxes", and he thought it would be "a fun way of doing it ... The first person narrator became the author of the novel". But Joyce revealed on his website that he is the author of the book, and the British Fantasy Award trophy he received for it bears his real name.

The section of the book about the effect the Gulf War had on returning soldiers had been previously published as a short story in 2007 as "An Ordinary Soldier of the Queen" under Joyce's name in The Paris Review. Joyce was very critical of Britain's involvement in the war with Iraq. He said in an interview in Locus magazine in April 2009:

I had to write it because there was a scream coming out of me about Iraq and our hideous and shameful adventure over there. And yet I also had this enormous sympathy with the ordinary boys and girls who are sent over to do the fighting. They get hoovered into the system and spat back dead or deranged.

== Critical reception ==
Reviewing Memoirs of a Master Forger in Strange Horizons, Michael Levy called Joyce "one of our very best practitioners of dark fantasy". Levy praised the book for its "emotional subtlety, well-developed characters, existential horror, and fine writing", and added that those hoping for "graphic horror ... blood and gore" will not find it here. He noted that the titles of the UK and US editions of the book "play games with the reader". Levy suggested that "it's all part of an elaborate hoax or game": William Heaney, the author of Memoirs of a Master Forger (UK title) is the novel's narrator, and How to Make Friends with Demons (US title) is the name of a book Heaney wrote in the novel.

Tammy Moore wrote at the SF Site that Memoirs of a Master Forger is not traditional fantasy or horror. While William can see demons, it is subtle and almost a non-event. Moore felt that William's "demonology" is ambiguous, and suggested that he is an unreliable narrator. She stated that she "did not care much" for William, in contrast with the other principal characters, whom she found "far more engaging creations". But she acknowledged that William's voice is "an effective vehicle" for the narrative, and found herself "caught up in the slowly revealing story". Moore concluded that the book is "worth the praise it has garnered".

In a review of the American edition of the book in The Magazine of Fantasy & Science Fiction, writer and critic, Charles de Lint called How to Make Friends with Demons "pure genius". He said it can be interpreted as either "a supernatural novel" or "a fascinating character study", and both work because of the way Joyce becomes his characters and makes them so real and believable. de Lint remarked:

I can't explain it, exactly. It's not just the details, or even how the story is laid out, so much as the voice itself – especially when it's in first person. The tone is always right.

A review of How to Make Friends with Demons at Publishers Weekly called it "a gripping, emotional and satisfying tale." While the magazine was a little critical of the "tacked-on political pontification", it described the book as "a profound meditation upon the evils of cruelty, self-absorption, cowardice and inaction."
