= World's End (Chadbourn novel) =

Fantasy novel

- Author: Mark Chadbourn
- Language: English
- Series: The Age of Misrule
- Set in: Fantasy
- Publisher: Millennium Publications, Gollancz (imprint)
- Publication date: 1999
- Publication place: United Kingdom
- Media type: Print (paperback)
- Pages: 557
- ISBN: 1857989805
- OCLC: 836934631
- Followed by: Darkest Hour

World's End is a novel written by British author Mark Chadbourn and the initial entry in The Age of Misrule trilogy. It was first published in Great Britain by Millennium on 14 September 2000. An edition collecting all three books in The Age of Misrule series (World's End, Darkest Hour and Always Forever) was published in Great Britain on 14 September 2006.

== Plot ==
Jack 'Church' Churchill and Ruth Gallagher witness a horrific supernatural creature kill a man underneath Albert Bridge on the Thames. While Ruth is suspended from work, Church discovers that similar odd events are happening all across Britain and a message from a woman named Laura, who claims to know how all these events are linked. They decide to visit her. Along the way, Church and Ruth pick up an old hippie named Tom. Laura explains to them that she was walking near an industrial estate when she was pulled to 'somewhere else' and told the world was going to change forever. She takes them to the place.

When they arrive, Church and Laura are pulled into a hole in the air. Church finds himself in a tower floating in space. As he makes his way through, he opens various doors and experiences visions, the first of which calls him a Brother of Dragons. A woman gives Church a lantern called the Wayfinder and tasks him with using it to find four other Brothers and Sisters of Dragons and four Treasures of the Tuatha Dé Danann that will empower her people, the Golden Ones, to fight the Night Walkers, who have Tom and Ruth surrounded. Church realises that Laura led him here on purpose, under the woman's orders. Church and Laura return through the hole in the air to find the estate in ruins in the aftermath of Ruth and Tom's escape attempt. They reunite with Ruth and reluctantly leave without Tom, whom they cannot find. Church deduces that Ruth and Laura are both Sisters of Dragons.

They follow the Wayfinder to Avebury and pass a test that nets them the first treasure, a powerful magical stone. This attracts the attention of the Wild Hunt, who pursue them and the stone across the moors. Church falls down a mineshaft, where the Night Walkers capture him and the Wayfinder. He meets fellow captive Ryan Veitch, whom Church recognizes as a Brother of Dragons. One of the Night Walkers, Catalin, tortures Church for information on the stone to no avail. Church also reunites with Tom, who calls the Night Walkers Fomorians and the Golden Ones Tuatha Dé Danann. The woman from the tower revisits Church and helps them escape. They retrieve the Wayfinder and follow its light across Dartmoor.

Ruth and Laura, meanwhile, find the last Brother of Dragons, Shavi, in a van on the side of the road. The three escape the Hunt to Glastonbury. At the Abbey, they meet James, a priest who says the 'Grail'—corresponding to one of the treasures, the cauldron—awaits them at Glastonbury Tor. He tells them that many dangers await, as legend says the leader of the Hunt lives there, but to obtain what they seek, they must take some water from the well to the tor at first light.

== Reception ==
Fantasy Book Review said that the author put detail into the work as if "he's walked every path, and driven every road that the characters have travelled upon. It all helps to make the book feel that bit more authentic than the average story" and that "it's a good start to the series; with a strong ending leaving ...[the reader] wanting more." It gave the book a 9 out of 10.

SFSignal gave the book 5 stars out of 5 stars. It praised how the book made the "transition from modern normalcy to chaos smooth and believable" and how "celtic myths and Arthurian legends ..sic[are] interwoven with English landscape".

Nathan Brazil of SFsite.com called it a great book for its sarcastic humour and an "essential dark fantasy".
