= Kissing The Beehive =

1997 novel by Jonathan Carroll

- Author: Jonathan Carroll
- Language: English
- Genre: Crime fiction
- Publisher: Bantam Books, Doubleday
- Publication date: 29 December 1997
- Publication place: USA
- Media type: Print (Paperback)
- Pages: 251
- ISBN: 9781453264966
- OCLC: 861846861
- Followed by: The Marriage of Sticks

Kissing The Beehive is a 1997 crime novel written by the American author Jonathan Carroll.

== Plot summary ==
Kissing The Beehive is about Sam Bayer who is an author. Due to lack of inspiration for a novel which he had already collected an advance, he visits Cranes View in New York for inspiration. On getting there, he gets involved in an unsolved mystery of a female teenager in the town. He joins his friend Frannie McCabe who is police chief of Cranes View.

== Awards and reception ==
Kissing the Beehive was nominated for the British Fantasy Award in 1999.
