= Scenting Hallowed Blood =

1996 novel by Storm Constantine

- Author: Storm Constantine
- Language: English
- Publication date: 1996

Scenting Hallowed Blood is a 1996 novel written by Storm Constantine.

== Plot summary ==
Scenting Hallowed Blood is a novel in which Shemyaza is a fallen angel estranged from the ancient, secretive race known as the Grigori. While the Grigori pursue covert dominion over the Earth, Shemyaza—now a rogue—emerges as the lone force capable of resisting their shadowy ambitions. The narrative unfolds in High Crag, Cornwall, a remote and haunted landscape filled with occult significance. As the turn of the millennium approaches, the Grigori focus their dark energies on unlocking the site's mystical power. Shemyaza, joined by allies—mystic Daniel and twins Owen and Lily Winter—must thwart their conspiracies before it is too late.

== Reception ==
Andy Butcher reviewed Scenting Hallowed Blood for Arcane magazine, rating it an 8 out of 10 overall, and stated that "Although little over half as long as Stalking Tender Prey, Scenting Hallowed Blood is nonetheless a worthy sequel. In many ways it's a tighter, more focused work - freed from the need to explain so much of the background of the Grigori, Constantine concentrates more on the story and characterisation. This does mean that you really need to have read Stalking Tender Prey in order to understand what's going on. But that's hardly a chore even at over 600 pages, it's a damn fine book itself, and now you've got the perfect reason to buy yourself a copy."

== Reviews ==
- Review by Faren Miller (1996) in Locus, #429 October 1996
- Review by K. V. Bailey (1996) in Vector 190
- Review by Brian Stableford (1997) in Interzone, January 1997
- Review by Justina Robson (1998) in Nova Express, Winter/Spring 1998
