= Graham Joyce =

British writer (1954–2014)

Graham William Joyce
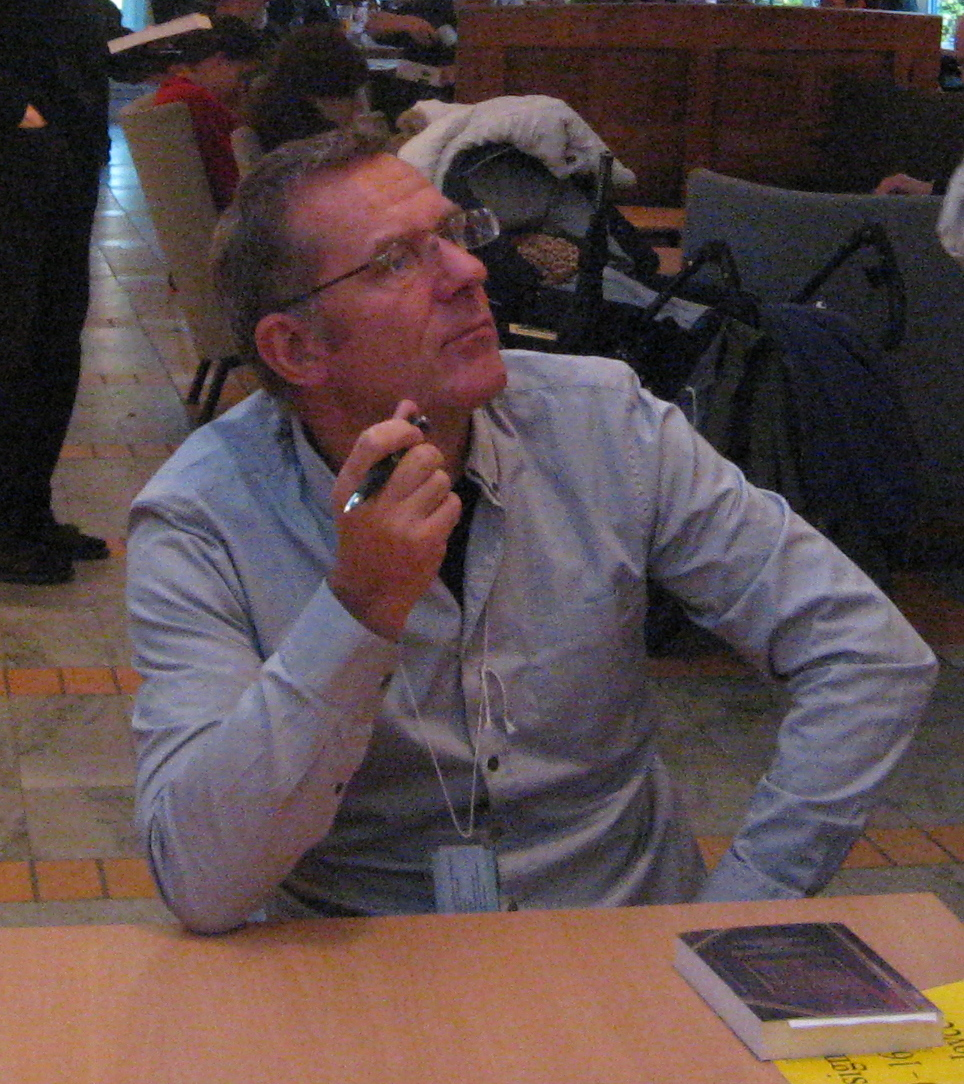
- Joyce signing books at Imagicon 2: Swecon 2009
- Born: 22 October 1954; Keresley, England
- Died: 9 September 2014 (aged 59)
- Occupations: Writer and teacher
- Writing career
- Genre: Speculative Fiction
- Website: grahamjoyce.co.uk

Graham William Joyce (22 October 1954 – 9 September 2014) was a British writer of speculative fiction and the recipient of numerous awards, including the O. Henry Award, the World Fantasy Award, and six times the British Fantasy Award for both his novels and short stories.

== Biography ==
The son of a working-class parents, Joyce grew up in Keresley, a small mining village just outside Coventry, before moving to live in Leicester. In interview, he speaks of the influence of the woods and countryside of his childhood, woods which, he later discovered, were among the last remaining parts of the Forest of Arden.

Joyce names his grandmother as an early influence; a woman who spoke of seeing ghosts and whose strong personality inspires several of the women characters in his books. He says in interview: 'It’s true that I have been surrounded by strong women. As I grew up I spent a lot of my time with my grandmother and also with my five aunts, all of whom were very strong-willed and opinionated!'

Joyce received a BEd degree from Bishop Lonsdale College in 1977 (now University of Derby) and an M.A. degree in Modern English and American Literature from the University of Leicester in 1980, Joyce worked as a youth officer for the National Association of Youth Clubs until 1988, when he and his wife Suzanne moved to the Greek islands of Lesbos and Crete, during which time Joyce wrote his first novel, Dreamside.

After selling Dreamside to Pan Books in 1991, Joyce moved back to England to pursue a career as a writer. He was awarded a PhD degree by publication at Nottingham Trent University, where he taught creative writing from 1996 until his death and was made a reader in creative writing.

Joyce was a strong supporter of children's education and literacy, and in 2014 spearheaded a petition signed by more than 100,000 people to remove Michael Gove from office over his changes to the English literature GCSE syllabus, telling The Guardian: "Michael Gove climbs on tables and gleefully tears the wings from mockingbirds as his coterie of supporters looks on with immobilised grins, knowing there is no one around with the power or the will to stop him."

In 2011, in a piece for The Guardian, he spoke against the 'cultural elitism' of those who equate readability with 'dumbing down', following an attack by Jeanette Winterson on the Booker Prize shortlist.

Joyce was the regular first-choice goalkeeper for the England Writers football team, appearing in international fixtures against Germany, Italy, Sweden, Norway, Israel, Hungary, Turkey and Austrian Writers teams. He described his footballing experiences in his non-fiction book Simple Goalkeeping Made Spectacular.

He was a supporter of Coventry City FC and occasionally wrote pieces for fanzines.

Joyce died on 9 September 2014. He had been diagnosed with Mantle Cell lymphoma in 2013. Joyce's reaction to his cancer was to publish several essays on the "shocking clarity" the news had brought him on the subject of death. He said "your life is suddenly propelled along a remorseless narrative that has the structure of all great mythical journeys".

Graham Joyce lived in Wistow, near Leicester, with his wife and their two children.

== Style and themes ==
Bill Sheehan, who wrote the introduction for Partial Eclipse, states:

Among the issues Graham dramatizes are the inevitability of grief, loss, growth, and change, the primal importance of family bonds, the beauty of the feminine, the life altering effects of parenthood, the nature of the creative unconscious, the overwhelming power of the erotic, the corrupting effects of power, the importance of self-awareness, and the fundamental need for order, meaning, and coherence in the face of a chaotic, inimical universe.

American author, editor and literary critic Jeff VanderMeer said:

Joyce's fiction has always displayed a certain generosity of spirit that lifts it above the ordinary. This generosity is not at all sentimental, but is alive with sentiment and an appreciation for the mysteries of life.

Joyce published Memoirs of a Master Forger under a pseudonym, William Heaney. He told the Guardian that because it was 'a book about forged manuscripts, faked personalities and literary hoaxes ... it seemed like a fun way of doing it.'Some critics classify Joyce as a magic realist in the vein of such Latin American writers as Gabriel García Márquez or Julio Cortázar. Joyce disagrees with this, feeling that his lineage is tied more closely to writers of the English "weird tale" such as Arthur Machen or Algernon Blackwood. He calls his style of writing "Old Peculiar."

== Film ==
The short film Black Dust was released in 2012, produced by James Laws of Pretzel Films, scripted by Joyce and Laws. Currently, there are no feature-length films based on Joyce's novels or shorts. However, the film rights to Dreamside, The Tooth Fairy, and Dark Sister have all been optioned, as have Do the Creepy Thing, The Silent Land and Some Kind of Fairy Tale.

== Music ==
Joyce co-wrote song lyrics for French songwriter and composer Emilie Simon on her albums The Big Machine (2009) and Franky Knight (2011).

== Games ==
On 16 January 2009, the site Computer and Video Games reported that Graham Joyce had been hired by id Software to "help develop the storyline potential" of Doom 4; after Joyce died in 2014, Adam Gascoine was brought in as a replacement.

== Critical reception ==
Adam Roberts stated "Graham Joyce's The Year of the Ladybird showed that he is one of the best writers of ghost stories we have." Josh Lacey of The Guardian ranked him alongside Philip Pullman, Angela Carter, and Jonathan Carroll as part of a 'small group of fascinating writers... who pursue adult themes and ideas without shedding childhood fears and obsessions.'

== Bibliography ==
According to his official site and the Internet Database of Speculative Fiction, Graham Joyce published fourteen novels and twenty-six short stories.

=== Novels and short story collections ===
Name	Published	ISBN	Notes
Dreamside	1991	ISBN 978-0-312-87546-6	
Dark Sister	1992	ISBN 978-0-312-87254-0	British Fantasy Award winner, 1993
House of Lost Dreams	1993	ISBN 978-0-7472-4248-2	
Requiem	1995	ISBN 978-0-312-86452-1	British Fantasy Award winner, 1996; World Fantasy Award nominee, 1996
The Tooth Fairy	1996	ISBN 978-0-312-86833-8	British Fantasy Award winner, 1997
The Stormwatcher	1997	ISBN 978-1-892389-36-7	British Fantasy Award nominee, 1999
The Web: Spiderbite	1997	ISBN 978-1-85881-527-5	Young Adult
Indigo	1999	ISBN 978-0-671-03937-0	British Fantasy Award winner, 2000
Smoking Poppy	2001	ISBN 978-0-671-03939-4	British Fantasy Award nominee, 2002
The Facts of Life	2002	ISBN 978-0-7434-6342-3	World Fantasy Award winner, 2003; British Fantasy Award nominee, 2003
Partial Eclipse and Other Stories	2003	ISBN 978-1-931081-62-7	collection
The Limits of Enchantment	2005	ISBN 978-0-7434-6344-7	World Fantasy Award nominee, 2006
TWOC	2005	ISBN 978-0-571-22513-2	Young Adult; Angus Award "winner"
Do the Creepy Thing	2006	ISBN 978-0-571-23035-8	Young Adult; released in the US as The Exchange (2008) ISBN 978-0-670-06207-2
Three Ways to Snog an Alien	2008	ISBN 978-0-571-23951-1	Young Adult
Memoirs of a Master Forger	2008	ISBN 978-0-575-08297-7	as William Heaney; released in the US as How to Make Friends with Demons (2009) ISBN 978-1-59780-142-3 British Fantasy Award winner
The Devil's Ladder	2009	ISBN 978-0-571-24247-4	Young Adult
The Silent Land	2010	ISBN 978-0-385-53380-5	World Fantasy Award nominee, 2011; British Fantasy Award nominee, 2011
Some Kind of Fairy Tale	2012	ISBN 978-0-385-53578-6	British Fantasy Novel award winner, 2013
The Year of the Ladybird	2013	ISBN 978-0-575-11531-6	released in the US in 2014 as The Ghost in the Electric Blue Suit
25 Years in the Word Mines: The Best of Graham Joyce	2014	ISBN 978-1-848-63804-4	Poosthumous collection from PS Publishing

=== Short stories ===
- "Monastic Lives" (1992)
- "The Careperson" (1992)
- "Last Rising Sun" (1992)
- "The Ventriloquial Art" (1993)
- "The Apprentice" (1993)
- "Under the Pylon" (1993)
- "Gap-Sickness" (1993)
- "Eat Reecebread" (1994) with Peter F. Hamilton
- "The Reckoning" (1994)
- "Black Ball Game" (1995)
- "A Tip from Bobby Moore" (1996)
- "The White Stuff" (1997) with Peter F. Hamilton
- "Pinkland" (1997)
- "The Mountain Eats People" (1998)
- "As Seen on Radio" (1998)
- "Leningrad Nights" (1999)
- "Candia" (1999)
- "Incident in Mombasa" (1999)
- "Horrograph" (1999)
- "Partial Eclipse" (2000)
- "Xenos Beach" (2000)
- "Coventry Boy" (2001)
- "Leningrad Nights" (2002)
- "The Coventry Boy" (2002)
- "First, Catch Your Demon" (2002)
- "Black Dust" (2002)
- "Tiger Moth" (2003)
- "An Ordinary Soldier of the Queen" (2007) – O. Henry Award Juror Favorites, 2009
- "The Oversoul" (2008) – first published in Who Can Save Us Now? (2008), edited by Owen King and John McNally

=== Articles ===
- "Working Class Monster". Salon. June 2000. Archived from the original on 12 March 2006.
- "Greek Virtues"
- "The Great God Pan"
- "Two weeks, three couples and six kids equals hell"
