= Mark Chadbourn =

English author

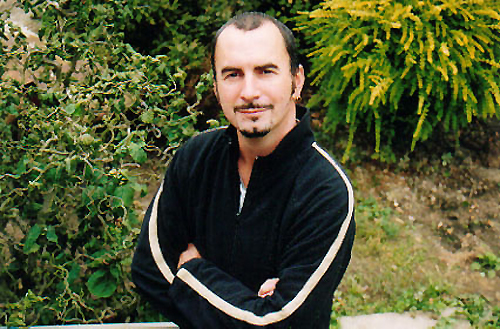
- Born: Ashby-de-la-Zouch, England
- Occupations: Author and Scriptwriter
- Writing career
- Pen name: James Wilde
- Period: 1990–present
- Genres: Fantasy, horror, science fiction, historical fiction
- Website: markchadbourn.co.uk

Mark Chadbourn is an English fantasy, science fiction, historical fiction, and horror author with more than a dozen novels (and one non-fiction book) published around the world. He also writes historical novels under the pseudonym "James Wilde". In addition to his novels he is a scriptwriter.

== Early life ==
Born in the English Midlands from a long line of coal miners, Chadbourn gained a degree in Economic History and went on to become a journalist, working for some of Britain's leading newspapers and magazines including The Times, The Independent, and Marie Claire.

== Career ==
Chadbourn's writing career began in 1990 when his first published short story, Six Dead Boys in a Very Dark World, won Fear magazine's Best New Author award.

Six of his novels have been shortlisted for the British Fantasy Society's August Derleth Award for Best Novel, and he has won the British Fantasy Award twice, for his novella The Fairy Feller's Master-Stroke (2003) and for his short story "Whisper Lane" (2007).

His novel Jack of Ravens was published in the UK on 20 July 2006, the first in a new sequence called Kingdom of the Serpent. The second book, The Burning Man, was published in April 2008. The final book in the trilogy, Destroyer of Worlds, has been published in July 2009.

His earlier publications include two series, The Age of Misrule and The Dark Age.

Chadbourn has been described as "a contemporary bard – a post-industrial Taliesin whose visionary novels are crammed with remixed mythologies, oneiric set pieces, potent symbols, unsettling imagery and an engaging fusion of genre elements. The author's ambition is sustained by his invention: his work is distinguished by breakneck but brilliantly controlled plots, meticulous research, deft characterisation and a crisp, accessible prose style."

He also writes historical novels under the pseudonym "James Wilde." He announced on Twitter that his novel Pendragon was shortlisted for Best Published Novel in the Wilbur Smith Adventure Writing Award, the result to be announced in September 2018. Chadbourn was a runner-up. A year later the best-selling adventure writer Wilbur Smith, who established the award, contacted Chadbourn and asked if he would like to collaborate on a novel, as mentioned on both authors' websites. The result, The New Kingdom, is a historical fantasy set in Ancient Egypt and will be published in September 2021.

In addition to his novels, he was a scriptwriter for the BBC drama Doctors. In 2014, he announced on his website that his contemporary thriller TV series, Shadow State, had been optioned by Clerkenwell Films.

== Works ==
=== Novels ===
- Underground (1992)
- Nocturne (1994)
- The Eternal (1996)
- Scissorman (1997)

==== The Age of Misrule ====
- World's End (1999)
- Darkest Hour (2000)
- Always Forever (2001)

==== The Dark Age ====
- The Devil in Green (2002)
- The Queen of Sinister (2004)
- The Hounds of Avalon (2005)

==== Kingdom of the Serpent ====
- Jack of Ravens (2006)
- The Burning Man (2008)
- Destroyer of Worlds (July 2009)

==== The Ghost Warrior ====
- Lord of Silence (July 2009)

==== Swords of Albion ====
- The Silver Skull (November 2009, UK (Title: "The Sword of Albion": April 2010)
- "The Scar-Crow Men" (February 2011, UK: April 2011)
- The Devil's Looking Glass (UK: April 2012, US: tbc)

==== Hereward (as James Wilde) ====
- Hereward (July 2011)
- Hereward: The Devil's Army (July 2012)
- Hereward: End of Days (July 2013)
- Hereward: Wolves of New Rome (July 2014)
- Hereward: The Immortals (July 2015)
- Hereward: The Bloody Crown (July 2016)

==== Dark Age (as James Wilde) ====
- Pendragon (July 2017)
- Dark Age (October 2018)
- The Bear King (January 2020)

==== Ancient Egypt Books (with Wilbur Smith) ====
- The New Kingdom (September 2021)
- Titans of War (2022)
- Testament (2023)
- House of Two Pharaohs (2025)

=== Novellas ===
- The Fairy Feller's Master Stroke (2002)
- Doctor Who: Wonderland (2003)

=== Non fiction ===
- Testimony (1996)

=== Other works ===
- The Book of Shadows (2006) (graphic novel)
- Hellboy: The Oddest Jobs – Straight No Chaser (2008)
- Hellboy: The Ice Wolves (October 2009)

=== Screenwriting ===
- Doctors (BBC1, 2002–2014)

Plus numerous short stories including the award-winning "Whisper Lane" in BFS – A Celebration anthology in 2006, and "Who Slays the Gyant, Wounds the Beast" in The Solaris Book of New Fantasy (UK) December 2007
