= The Age of Misrule =

Fantasy novel series

The trilogy, in order of publication from left to right.

The Age of Misrule is a three-book modern fantasy novel series, written by Mark Chadbourn. It is set in Britain and the faery Otherworld around the beginning of the third millennium.

This series is followed by The Dark Age series.

== Plot summary ==
The story starts in January. The audience is not told what year it is: sometime after December 31, 1999, but not very long. It follows a man and a woman, both of whom have had loved ones taken from them in unpleasant circumstances. They see a man being killed by a giant. When they investigate, they discover that the man had been contacting UFOlogists.

The two protagonists decide to go on a trip to find out more. They meet an old hippie named Thomas, who saves them from a Fabulous Beast (a dragon). He informs them that they are being followed, and they hide out in Stonehenge, protected by the ley energy of the monument. Thomas then informs them that the world has changed, most forms of modern technology have ceased to function while magic now works according to its traditional lore, and that mythic creatures - Fabulous Beasts, elementals, and most importantly, the Fomorians and the Tuatha Dé Danann - are coming back to the world. The Fomorians have arrived first, however, and the Tuatha Dé Danann can only be summoned by a group called the Brothers and Sisters of Dragons. Apparently roped into this, they agree to help.

By the end of the first book of the three-book series, the initial idea - that the evil Fomorians would be dragged back to the Otherworld by the good fairies - has been shattered. It seems that Celtic cosmology is much closer to Lovecraftian ideals (Evil vs. Indifferent) than to Christian ones (Evil vs. Good), despite the fact, it is hinted, that the spirit beings are the basis of all religions anyway. The Tuatha are as keen as the Fomorians to stay, and the heroes are left knowing that the world will never be the same again.

The heroes then realise that they were chosen by the mysterious 'earth energy', and that they can use this energy to inspire others and fight the Fomorians themselves. They fight back and, in a final battle in London, apparently win. However, the Brothers and Sisters of Dragons are shattered, one dead, one lost in the Otherworld, and the last three to pass the story on.

An interesting twist on the classic 'otherworldly conspiracy' story is that, rather than fairy myths being ancient misinterpretations of UFO abductions, the UFO stories are presented as modern misinterpretations of fairy myths.

== Novels ==
- World's End (1999)
- Darkest Hour (2000)
- Always Forever (2001)

== Characters ==
=== Mortals ===
==== Brothers and Sisters of Dragons ====
- Jack Churchill, or Church, was training as an archaeologist, but upon the suicide of his girlfriend Marianne, he lost his faith in himself and was reduced to writing manuals. His knowledge of ancient religion and holy sites, from his time at university, is very helpful. He is the symbolic 'King', holding the Quincunx together.
- Ruth Gallagher was chosen by the Goddess to find Cernunnos. As a result of this task, she developed into an accomplished witch. Her life was changed when her uncle was killed in a bank robbery, causing her father to have a heart attack. Her lack of belief in the afterlife hit her cruelly.
- Laura DuSantiago's fundamentalist mother abused her as a child, but she escaped to university. When she returned home, her mother carved 'Jesus loves you' on her back. In the ensuing struggle, the mother was killed. She is a kind woman, hiding behind a callous facade.
- Ryan Veitch had nightmares about monsters during his childhood, but these stopped when he got the dream-monsters tattooed on himself. During a bank robbery, he was compelled to shoot Mr. Gallagher, but his brothers allowed him to flee, escaping gaol. Realizing the depth of their sacrifice has made him want to help those around him. Despite this, he is often derided by his friends.
- Shavi was the member of a Muslim family, but his rejection of their faith led his father to cast him out. He developed an interest in ley lines, Druidry, and his own sexuality; what may be called Shamanism in the modern world. While leaving a gay bar, he and his boyfriend were attacked by a stranger, resulting in the death of his boyfriend.

==== Others ====
- Tom, or Thomas Learmont, serves as the group's guide and advisor. In the 13th century he was carried off to the Otherworld, where his singing voice endeared him to the Queen. He was 'taken apart', then put back together. As a result of this, he can partially see the future and cannot lie. Briefly, he became involved in Scottish politics, before being chased back into the Otherworld. As a result of spending half his life in the Otherworld, he has managed to survive into modern times. He thoroughly enjoyed the sixties, during which he was 'spiritual advisor' to the Grateful Dead.
- James is a priest at Glastonbury. He is a member of the Watchmen, a group selected from Anglican priests in and around Glastonbury to safeguard knowledge of a gate to the Otherworld on top of Glastonbury Tor. Later, he was librarian at the cathedral of Salisbury.
- Callow is a well mannered gent who has fallen on hard times and speaks with The Brother and Sisters of Dragons briefly before they continue on their journey. He is captured by Calatin and is tortured and twisted into something more than human. He is described as having "Lidless staring eyes" and walking in a skittering motion. His ultimate fate following Always Forever is unknown.

=== Immortals ===
- The Lady, the spirit of the growing season (spring, summer, autumn) and the sacred feminine. Also known as the Triple Goddess, Hecate, Brigid and the Virgin Mary.
- The Lord, the spirit of the cold time (winter) and masculinity. Stayed with humans the longest, even when the others left. Also known as Cernunnos, Odin and Robin Hood.
- Nuada, the leader of the Golden Ones. Officially thanks the Brothers and Sisters of Dragons for returning the Tuatha Dé Danann to the world. Proud and handsome, but cold and inhuman. Also known as Lud, Nudd, and Tiwaz.
- Ogma, librarian and wisest of the Golden Ones. One of the few good immortals seen in the first book.
- Dian Cecht, the healer of the Golden Ones, who appears in the second book 'Darkest Hour'. He is hard and cruel. According to legends, which Tom repeat to Jack, he once killed his own son out of envy.

== Locations ==
=== Real ===
- London, where Ruth and Jack Churchill live at the beginning of the story
- Stonehenge, where Church and Ruth first experience the Blue Fire.
- Salisbury with Salisbury Cathedral
- Avebury, where Laura finds the stone
- Bristol with Frenchay Hospital
- Glastonbury Abbey
- Dartmoor
- Tintagel Castle, where Jack Churchill, Tom and Veith find the sword
- Tenby and Caldey Island
- Manorbier and Manorbier Castle
- Inverness and Tomnahurich
- Edinburgh Castle
- Roslin Castle and Chapel and several minor locations in London are mentioned.

=== Fictional ===
The following locations in the Otherworld are visited.

- Grail Tower
