= From the Teeth of Angels =

1994 novel by Jonathan Carroll

- First edition (US)
- Author: Jonathan Carroll
- Cover artist: Honi Werner
- Language: English
- Published: 1994
- Publisher: Doubleday (US); HarperCollins (US)
- Publication place: United States
- Pages: 212
- ISBN: 0385468415

From the Teeth of Angels is a novel by the American writer Jonathan Carroll, first published in 1994. It tells the story of three interconnected fates. The question of death is being discussed in this novel.
