= White Apples =

2002 novel by Jonathan Carroll

- Author: Jonathan Carroll
- Language: English
- Genre: Science fiction
- Published: 2002 (Tor Books)
- Pages: 304
- ISBN: 978-0765303882

White Apples is a surreal fiction novel written by the American writer Jonathan Carroll, first published in 2002.

== Synopsis ==
White Apples tells the story of Vincent Ettrich, who is dead and brought back to life again. Ettrich slowly learns that he is brought back by his wife Isabelle and he is back to save his unborn son. Ettrich's unborn son will eventually save the universe if Ettrich can protect him from evil forces. This is a work of metaphysics and surrealism.
