= Dreamside =

1991 novel by Graham Joyce

- First edition
- Author: Graham Joyce
- Language: English
- Genres: Speculative fiction, fantasy
- Publisher: Pan Books
- Publication date: 1991
- Publication place: United Kingdom
- Media type: Print (Paperback)
- Pages: 248
- ISBN: 0-330-31339-8
- OCLC: 46645066

Dreamside is a fantasy novel by British author Graham Joyce, first published in the United Kingdom by Pan Books in 1991. It was later reprinted in the United States by Tor Books in 2000. The novel's primary themes are the power of the subconscious and the futility of attempting to escape the past.

Joyce wrote Dreamside in the late-1980s while living on the Greek islands of Lesbos and Crete. He sold the book in 1989. Dreamside was later translated into French by Thomas Bauduret and published as L'enfer du rêve in France in May 1995.

== Plot introduction ==
The novel revolves around four British college students who are drawn together as volunteers in a study on lucid dreaming. The study group dwindles over the span of the semester until only four students, Lee, Ella, Brad, and Honora, are left.

Led by Professor L. P. Burns, the remaining students accept the role of paid researchers for an experimental field of study: shared lucid dreaming. They create a pocket of shared space they refer to as, "Dream side" and begin to experiment with several phenomena. But venturing to Dream-side has a number of unexpected side-effects: it becomes increasingly difficult for the dreamers to separate their lucid dreams and reality. This builds to an act of violence that shatters the students' trust in one another. The four decide to put Dream side behind them for good.

== Plot summary ==
The novel opens in February 1986 with Lee Peterson waking up and going about his daily routine before heading to work. But something is off. Lee takes an egg from the refrigerator and tries to break it into a frying pan. It does not break. He tries again; it wobbles. Lee then wakes up. He begins his routine again only to wake up again. This happens a number of times, like the peeling of one layer of onion off another. Lee calls these occurrences repeaters.

The phone rings and he wakes up again to hear a voice that he had not heard since his college days: Ella Innes. The first thing they say to each other is that it is happening again. They thought they could escape Dreamside only to find that over ten years later, it is once again worming its tendrils back into their lives.

Lee and Ella meet to discuss why this was happening to them now and what to do about it. Believing that either Brad or Honora is travelling to Dreamside and causing the effects to manifest in the others, Ella convinces Lee that they must find their other two classmates. Lee reluctantly agrees to go find Brad while Ella searches for a reclusive Honora.

The novel flashes back twelve years earlier to April 1974 when Lee, wanting desperately to start a conversation with Ella, joins a lucid dreaming study that she shows interest in.

The group consists of a variety of students, some pretending that they lucid dream and those that legitimately can. Over the semester, the group dwindles to a few students. At the end, Professor L.P. Burns picks Ella and Lee along with Brad and Honora. Burns' decision to select two pairs of the opposite sex may have been deliberate: over the course of the study, Lee and Ella become intimate. Brad, an obnoxious yet skilled lucid dreamer, wishes the same scenario between him and the shy Honora. The professor is conducting a double-blind study. The lucid dreaming serves as a distraction to study group dynamics. However, Burns' interest in the dream data increases as the four began showing promising results with the exercises.

Brad and Ella are the first to contact one another in a shared lucid dream. The dreamscape mirrored a park setting that the couple had copulated in near the beginning of their relationship. Brad and Honora have less luck.

The Professor, wishing to set the foundation for a share dream space between the four, takes the students for a weekend vacation to a rural cabin owned by a colleague of his. A few miles down the road is a scenic lake with a single ancient tree leaning over it. After the trip, the four finally meet in Dreamside. This world vaguely mimics the lake area.

As Lee and Ella perform sexual experiments in Dreamside, Brad aggressively pursues Honora in hopes of being able to experience what the other couple is. Honora rejects him, saying that she wishes to remain a virgin. Brad argues that it would not count in Dreamside.

Around this same time, the group discovers certain frightening aspects of Dreamside. If they stop paying attention to themselves, the dreams begin to meld and sink into the ground, water, or tree. Also, the occurrence of repeaters have increased. The students feel as if the waking world and the dreaming world are beginning to interweave. Concerned, Professor Burns decides to bring the experiment to a conclusion. Before the matter can be discussed further, the students find out the next day that Burns has died.

Against Professor Burns' wishes, Brad, Lee, and Honora decide to continue the experiments. During one particular session, Brad finally forces himself upon Honora in Dreamside and rapes her. Honora wakes up in her own bed to find that her sheets are stained with blood. At this point Honora goes into seclusion and withdraws from any more experiments.

The novel flashes back into the present where Ella finds Honora who is now a grade school teacher. Honora confides with Ella that she had a miscarriage in the real world, but gave birth to a daughter in Dreamside. This girl, who is now approximately twelve years of age, is now making appearances in the waking world.

The four dreamers meet together in the real once again and try to figure out how to rectify the problem they left behind. Then one night they are all pulled in back to Dreamside. The world is now ice-covered and barren. A hurricane-strength storm whips through the dream and in the middle of it, they find Honora and Brad's daughter. They try to escape, but the storm rages on. Honora lets go of the others, saying that the girl wants her to join her in the raging waters. Brad chases after her and pulls her from the water before either falling or jumping in. He's never found, in either world.

== Characters ==
=== Professor L.P. Burns ===
An elderly gentleman who leads a group of students in an experiment in lucid dreaming. Even though he feels the effects of old age, Burns prefers the company of young people. His calm methodology has a tempering effect on the creative energy of the group. He isn't free, however, of an occasional tantrum when his students waste his time with faux intellectualism. These outbursts—although Burns would never admit it—may be the emotional leftovers of a man who suffers from loneliness after the death of his wife, Lilly.

=== Lee Peterson ===
Lee is a man on the cusp of middle age. He admits that he could stand to lose a few pounds. His life after college has been fairly safe and run of the mill. He currently works at an advertising agency. In college, he lusted after Ella Innes. She was, in fact, the reason he decided to join the lucid dreaming experiment in the first place.

=== Ella Innes ===
Ella still shows some of the eccentricities of her youth. Wearing jackets three sizes too large, driving her convertible with the top down in the middle of winter, willing to travel long distances at the drop of the dime, she is a fairly unorthodox woman. Ella is the natural leader of the group and has the motivation to do what is necessary. In college, Ella was infatuated with appearing as an activist. Her dorm was draped in thick Persian rugs and heavily scented with incense. She wore berets and patchouli and had a favourite catch phrase of "Then do it." One interesting development in Ella over the years is her emotional vulnerability, being willing to cry in Lee's arms when she is overwhelmed. This hidden sensitivity was personally noted by Professor Burns many years ago.

=== Honora Brennan ===
Honora is a quiet, shy woman from Ireland. She currently works as a grade school teacher. Honora is deeply Catholic. During college, Honora joined the lucid dreaming experiment because she thought she had potential to be a lucid dreamer, having been somewhat successful with it in the past. She rebuffed Brad's constant attempts to become intimate with her. She was secretly infatuated with Lee, but said nothing when she saw that he was interested in Ella.

=== Brad Cousins ===
Brad is a boisterous, tactless man who has spent his post-college years moving from one country to another, to one company after another. When Lee finds him, Brad has holed himself up in his apartment and has been drinking heavily. During college, Brad seems to have been attracted to Ella, but it manifested in a barbed verbal exchanges between the two. He refocused his lust towards Honora, to her distaste.

== Major themes ==
Dreaming has traditionally been considered the manifestation of the subconscious. Lucid-dreaming is a phenomenon that provides a bridge in between two levels of consciousness. In managing to tap four individual subconsciousnesses and conjoining them into a single dreamscape, Joyce has created a literal occurrence of the phrase "collective unconscious." As with any new experience, the four students open themselves up to not only new wonders of Dreamside, but also new dangers. The students' decision to continue the experiments without the controlling factor of the professor's oversight opens them up to possibilities and dangers that they lack the maturity to handle.

The eventual conclusion to the experiments is that tragedy occurs and all four students attempt to leave it behind as they did with other follies of their youth. However, given the nature of a shared subconscious, the entire group carry their past actions with them into midlife. Sometimes escaping the past simply isn't an option.

== Allusions/references to other works ==
Each chapter of Dreamside opens with a quote relevant to the topic of dreaming and youth. These quotes range throughout history and cultures, many of them acting as foreshadowing to later parts of the novel.

== References to current science ==
Many of the exercises and phenomena involving lucid dreaming were taken from actual sleep research studies and exercises. The various methods that the characters used to determine if they were dreaming are called induction techniques. The "repeaters" that Lee suffers from in the Prologue are called false awakenings. The immobility that the characters suffer from in Dreamside are similar to the effects of sleep paralysis.

== Reception ==
In a 1991 review of Dreamside in Vector, Martin Brice found the book "fascinating" and "quite disturbing", which, Brice said, "is ... one of the purposes of fantastical literature." In another review in Vector in 2001, Iain Emsley called Dreamside "a very human novel". He said it is not a "twee study of youth [with] a happy ending", but a story about very ordinary people dealing with their "broken lives". Emsley praised the "maturity" of Joyce's writing, in particular the way he "disorientates the reader as the relationships between the two worlds shift from being intertwined to being polar opposites, moving the perception of the threat."

Reviewing the novel in Interzone, science fiction and fantasy author and critic John Clute stated that while Dreamside may not be very original, it is "a beautiful little book". He said that although Joyce tends to evoke Lewis Carroll "too slavishly", and the ending is "a little too neat", Dreamside "is a welcome read": the story "wells up inside itself" and "[t]here is more to this book than it can hold".

Writing in the Science Fiction Chronicle, American fantasy and science fiction author and critic Don D'Ammassa called Dreamside a "well plotted, intelligently devised, and thoroughly gripping supernatural thriller." The entry for Joyce in Guide to Literary Masters & Their Works stated that the integration of emotional trauma and the supernatural in Dreamside "is an innovation that redeems [the book's] many problems."

== Film, TV or theatrical adaptations ==
On 1 August 2006, Joyce noted in a blog entry that he had optioned the film rights to Dreamside to a French producer. Although he will not script the film, Joyce offered an alternate ending to the story, as he had never been satisfied with the original. To date, there has been no news on further developments.

== Works cited ==
- Joyce, Graham (2012) [1991]. Dreamside (e-book ed.). G&S Books.
