= Jonathan Carroll =

American fiction writer (born 1949)

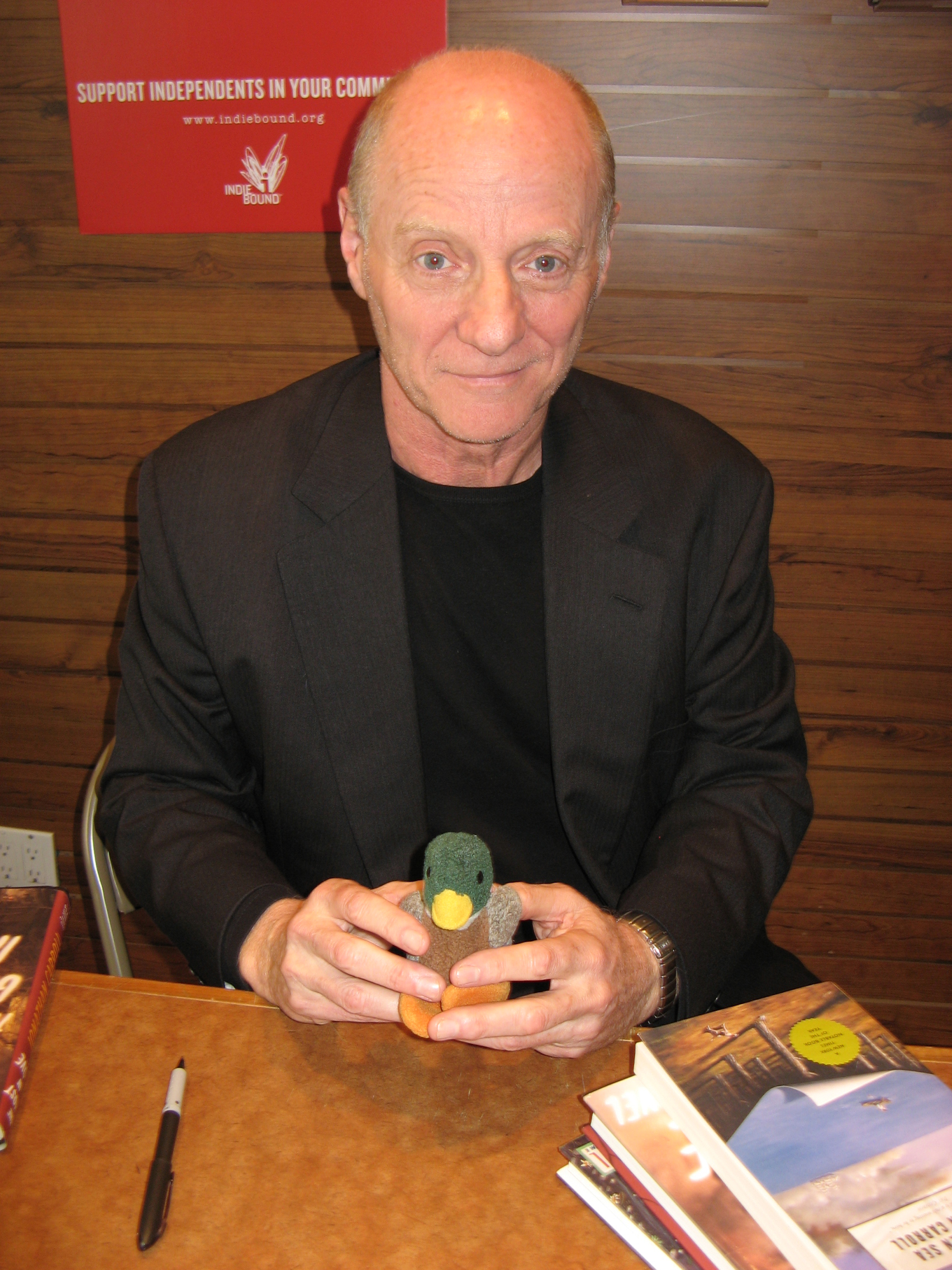
- Carroll in 2008
- Born: Jonathan Samuel Carroll; January 26, 1949 (age 77); New York City, US
- Occupations: Novelist, writer
- Writing career
- Genres: Magic realism, slipstream, contemporary fantasy
- Website: www.jonathancarroll.com

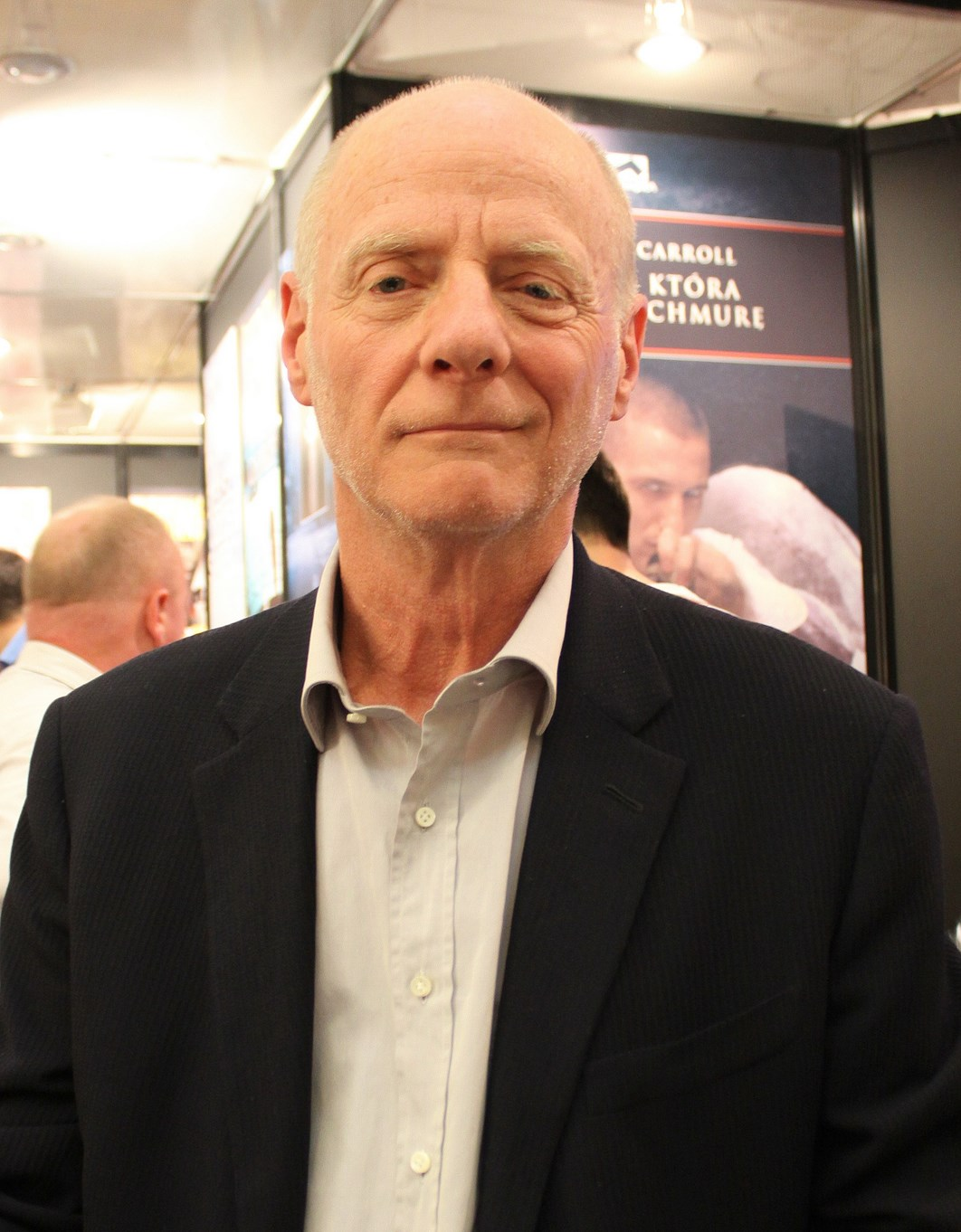
JCarroll in Poland (2012)

Jonathan Samuel Carroll (born January 26, 1949) is an American fiction writer primarily known for novels that may be labelled magic realism, slipstream or contemporary fantasy. He has lived in Austria since 1974.

== Life and work ==
Carroll was born in New York City to Sidney Carroll, a film writer whose credits included The Hustler, and June Carroll (née Sillman), an actress and lyricist who appeared in numerous Broadway shows and two films. He is the half brother of composer Steve Reich and nephew of Broadway producer Leonard Sillman. His parents were Jewish, but Carroll was raised in the Christian Science religion. A self-described "troubled teenager", he finished primary education at the Loomis School in Connecticut and graduated with honors from Rutgers University in 1971, marrying artist Beverly Schreiner in the same year. He relocated to Vienna, Austria a few years later and began teaching literature at the American International School, and has made his home in Austria ever since.

His first novel, The Land of Laughs (1980), is indicative of his general style and subject matter. Told through realistic first person narration, the novel concerns a young schoolteacher, Thomas Abbey, researching the life of a favorite children's book author of his youth, which involves meeting the author's daughter in her and her late father's seemingly idyllic (fictitious) home town of Galen, Missouri. Everything seems fine until a dog in Galen begins talking to Abbey. The line gradually blurs between the fantasy world created by Abbey's research subject and the life of the people in Galen, while the reader begins to wonder just how much trust can be placed in this narrator. Subsequent novels would expand on these themes, but often contain unreliable narrators in a world where magic is viewed as natural. (One commentator claimed in The Times that "if he were a Latin American writer with a three-part name, his books would be described as magical-realist".)

His son, Ryder Carroll, is the inventor of the Bullet Journal.

== Awards ==
Carroll's short story "Friend's Best Man" won the World Fantasy Award. His novel Outside the Dog Museum won the British Fantasy Award and his collection of short stories The Panic Hand won the Bram Stoker Award. The short story "Uh-Oh City" won the French Grand Prix de l'Imaginaire. His short story "Home on the Rain" was chosen as one of the best stories of the year by the Pushcart Prize committee. Carroll has been a runner-up for other World Fantasy Awards, the Hugo, and British Fantasy Awards.

== Bibliography ==
=== Novels ===
- The Land of Laughs (1980), illustrated by Wayne Anderson in 1982, James Marsh in 1984, Wayne Anderson in 1989
- Voice of Our Shadow (1983)
- The Answered Prayers Sextet
  - Bones of the Moon (1987) (slightly revised US edition, 1988), illustrated by James Marsh in 1987, Wayne Anderson in 1987
  - Sleeping in Flame (1988) – World Fantasy Award nominee, 1989, illustrated by James Marsh in 1988, Mel Odom in 1989, Wayne Anderson in 1989
  - A Child Across the Sky (1989, Washington Post Book of the Year) – BSFA nominee, 1989; WFA and Clarke nominee, 1990, illustrated by Janet Woolley in 1989, Wayne Anderson in 1990
  - Outside the Dog Museum (1991) – British Fantasy Award winner, WFA nominee, 1992
  - After Silence (1992)
  - From the Teeth of Angels (1994) – New York Times Book Review Notable Book; WFA nominee, 1995
- The Crane's View Trilogy
  - Kissing The Beehive (1997) – British Fantasy Award nominee, 1999
  - The Marriage of Sticks (2000) – British Fantasy Award nominee, 2000
  - The Wooden Sea (2001, New York Times Book Review Notable Book) – Locus and World Fantasy Awards nominee, 2002
- White Apples (2002) – Locus and World Fantasy Awards nominee, 2003
- Glass Soup (2005)
- Oko Dnia (Eye of the Day) (2006, Polish language edition)
- The Ghost in Love (2008)
- Bathing the Lion (2014)
- Mr. Breakfast (2019, Polish Language edition) (2020, Italian Language edition) (TBP Jan 17 2023, English Language edition)

=== Novellas and short novels ===
- Black Cocktail (1990)
- The Discovery of Running Bare (1992) [Included in Paul J. McAuley and Kim Newman's SF and Horror fiction anthology, In Dreams (Victor Gollancz Ltd, London). ]
- The Heidelberg Cylinder (2000) [1000 copy limited edition, signed by Jonathan Carroll and cover artist Dave McKean. A few remaining copies left over from the print run were sold without signatures.]
- Teaching the Dog to Read (2015)

=== Short story collections ===
- Die Panische Hand (1989) (German language edition)
- The Panic Hand (1995) [expansion of the 1989 German language edition; the 1996 US edition adds the novella Black Cocktail]
- The Woman Who Married A Cloud: Collected Stories (2012)

=== Nonfiction ===
- The Crow's Dinner (2017)
