= Black Cocktail =

1990 novella by Jonathan Carroll

- First edition
- Author: Jonathan Carroll
- Illustrator: Dave McKean
- Language: English
- Genre: Fantasy, dark comedy novella
- Publisher: Legend Press
- Publication date: 1990
- Publication place: United States
- Media type: Print (Paperback)
- Pages: 76 pp
- ISBN: 0-7126-2164-4
- OCLC: 23868280

Black Cocktail is a fantasy novella by American author Jonathan Carroll.

== Plot introduction ==
The novel follows the activities of Ingram York, a disc-jockey in Los Angeles. The book deals with the Platonic concept that everyone was originally joined to another human being and spends their lives searching for their missing half.

== Awards and nominations ==
- World Fantasy, Best Novella, 1991 (nominated)
