= Outside the Dog Museum =

1991 novel by Jonathan Carroll

- First edition (UK)
- Author: Jonathan Carroll
- Cover artist: Dave McKean
- Language: English
- Published: 1991 (UK); 1992 (US)
- Publisher: MacDonald & Co (UK); Doubleday (US)
- Publication place: United States
- Pages: 272
- ISBN: 0-356-19589-9

Outside the Dog Museum is a novel by the American writer Jonathan Carroll, published in 1991. It tells the story of Harry Radcliffe, a successful architect commissioned to design a Dog Museum for the wealthy Sultan of Saru. In the process, he finds a magical new world.
