= The Land of Laughs =

1980 novel by Jonathan Carroll

- First edition
- Author: Jonathan Carroll
- Cover artist: Wayne Anderson (1982); James Marsh (1984); Wayne Anderson (1989)
- Language: English
- Genre: Fantasy
- Publisher: Viking Press; Hamlyn; Legend Books
- Publication date: 1980
- Publication place: United States
- Media type: Print (Hardback)
- Pages: 241
- ISBN: 0-670-41755-6
- OCLC: 6221778
- Dewey Decimal: 813/.54
- LC Class: PS3553.A7646 L3 1980

The Land of Laughs is a low fantasy novel by American writer Jonathan Carroll. It was first published by Viking Press in 1980 and is the author's first novel. The novel was notably reprinted by Orion Books in 2000 as volume 9 of their Fantasy Masterworks series.

== Plot summary ==
In a used book store, Thomas Abbey, an avid fan of Marshall France, a deceased writer of unique children's books, has a chance encounter with Saxony Gardner, another enthusiast of that reclusive man. Together, they set out to the fictitious town of Galen, Missouri, to meet Anna France, the writer's daughter, in order to obtain her permission to write Marshall France's biography. Prepared for rejection, they are warmly welcomed and settle into the community and their literary endeavor.

However, they find an uncanny resemblance between the town of Galen and its inhabitants, and the literary world of their idol. Figures from Marshall France's books are alive in Galen, and Thomas and Saxony begin to question if the books were patterned on Galen, or if the writer's magic created Galen. Equally disturbing is Thomas's role as biographer: he appears to create reality by his writing, and begins to question the motives of Anna and the inhabitants of Galen. Events reach a crisis point when Thomas's biography reaches the time of Marshall France's arrival in Galen.

== Critical reception ==
In an article about Carroll's work, journalist Kim Newman called "The Land of Laughs" a strong debut" and "the most perfectly-plotted" of Carroll's novels. Science fiction historian Darrell Schweitzer wrote "to my mind, the best horror novel of recent years was Jonathan Carroll's The Land of Laughs."
