= A Child Across the Sky =

1989 novel by Jonathan Carroll

- First edition (UK)
- Author: Jonathan Carroll
- Cover artist: Janet Woolley (1989); Wayne Anderson (1990)
- Language: English
- Published: 1989 (UK); 1990 (US)
- Publisher: Century/Legend (UK); Doubleday (US)
- Publication place: United States
- Pages: 272
- ISBN: 0099709503

A Child Across the Sky is a novel by the American writer Jonathan Carroll, published in 1989. It tells the story of two friends in Hollywood and the mysterious death of one of them.
