= American Fantastic Tales =

Horror anthologies edited by Peter Straub

American Fantastic Tales is a set of two reprint horror anthologies, released as American Fantastic Tales: Terror and the Uncanny from Poe to the Pulps and American Fantastic Tales: Terror and the Uncanny from the 1940s to Now. Both anthologies were edited by Peter Straub. They were published by Library of America in 2009. The anthologies contain horror stories by American authors from the 18th century to modern times, split at 1940. The anthology pair itself won the 2010 World Fantasy Award—Anthology. The pair were also released as a boxed set in 2009.

Michael Schaub, in a review of the anthologies on NPR, states, "The usual horror suspects (Edgar Allan Poe, H.P. Lovecraft, Stephen King) are represented, but not by the stories you've read dozens of times before. Poe's "Berenice" is chosen, for example, instead of "The Tell-Tale Heart" or his other tales that have been anthologized to death."

== Contents ==
=== Poe to the Pulps ===
American Fantastic Tales: Terror and the Uncanny from Poe to the Pulps
- Hardcover edition
- Author: edited by Peter Straub
- Cover artist: Andy Kerry
- Language: English
- Series: American Fantastic Tales
- Genre: Fantasy, Horror short stories
- Publisher: Library of America
- Publication date: 2009
- Publication place: United States
- Media type: Print (hardback)
- Pages: xv, 746 pp
- ISBN: 978-1-59853-047-6
- OCLC: 311777136

- "Somnambulism: A Fragment", by Charles Brockden Brown
- "The Adventure of the German Student", by Washington Irving
- "Berenice", by Edgar Allan Poe
- "Young Goodman Brown", by Nathaniel Hawthorne
- "The Tartarus of Maids", by Herman Melville
- "What Was It? A Mystery", by Fitz-James O'Brien
- "The Legend of Monte del Diablo", by Bret Harte
- "The Moonstone Mass", by Harriet Prescott Spofford
- "His Unconquerable Enemy", by W. C. Morrow
- "In Dark New England Days", by Sarah Orne Jewett
- "The Yellow Wallpaper", by Charlotte Perkins Gilman
- "The Black Dog", by Stephen Crane
- "Ma'ame Pélagie", by Kate Chopin
- "Thurlow's Christmas Story", by John Kendrick Bangs
- "The Repairer of Reputations", by Robert W. Chambers
- "The Dead Valley", by Ralph Adams Cram
- "The Little Room", by Madeline Yale Wynne
- "The Striding Place", by Gertrude Atherton
- "An Itinerant House", by Emma Frances Dawson
- "Luella Miller", by Mary E. Wilkins Freeman
- "Grettir at Thorhall-stead", by Frank Norris
- "Yuki-Onna", by Lafcadio Hearn
- "For the Blood Is the Life", by F. Marion Crawford
- "The Moonlit Road", by Ambrose Bierce
- "Lukundoo", by Edward Lucas White
- "The Shell of Sense", by Olivia Howard Dunbar
- "The Jolly Corner", by Henry James
- "Golden Baby", by Alice Brown
- "Afterward", by Edith Wharton
- "Consequences", by Willa Cather
- "The Shadowy Third", by Ellen Glasgow
- "Absolute Evil", by Julian Hawthorne
- "Unseen—Unfeared", by Francis Stevens
- "The Curious Case of Benjamin Button", by F. Scott Fitzgerald
- "The Curse of Everard Maundy", by Seabury Quinn
- "The King of the Cats", by Stephen Vincent Benét
- "The Jelly-Fish", by David H. Keller
- "Mr. Arcularis", by Conrad Aiken
- "The Black Stone", by Robert E. Howard
- "Passing of a God", by Henry S. Whitehead
- "The Panelled Room", by August Derleth
- "The Thing on the Doorstep", by H. P. Lovecraft
- "Genius Loci", by Clark Ashton Smith
- "The Cloak", by Robert Bloch

=== 1940s to Now ===
American Fantastic Tales: Terror and the Uncanny from the 1940s to Now
- Hardcover edition
- Author: edited by Peter Straub
- Cover artist: Fredrik Broden
- Language: English
- Series: American Fantastic Tales
- Genre: Fantasy, Horror short stories
- Publisher: Library of America
- Publication date: 2009
- Publication place: United States
- Media type: Print (hardback)
- Pages: xv, 713 pp
- ISBN: 978-1-59853-048-3
- OCLC: 311777129

- "Evening Primrose", by John Collier
- "Smoke Ghost", by Fritz Leiber
- "The Mysteries of the Joy Rio", by Tennessee Williams
- "The Refugee", by Jane Rice
- "Mr. Lupescu", by Anthony Boucher
- "Miriam", by Truman Capote
- "Midnight", by Jack Snow
- "Torch Song", by John Cheever
- "The Daemon Lover", by Shirley Jackson
- "The Circular Valley", by Paul Bowles
- "I'm Scared", by Jack Finney
- "The Vane Sisters", by Vladimir Nabokov
- "The April Witch", by Ray Bradbury
- "Black Country", by Charles Beaumont
- "Trace", by Jerome Bixby
- "Where the Woodbine Twineth", by Davis Grubb
- "Nightmare", by Donald Wandrei
- "I Have No Mouth, and I Must Scream", by Harlan Ellison
- "Prey", by Richard Matheson
- "The Events at Poroth Farm", by T. E. D. Klein
- "Hanka", by Isaac Bashevis Singer
- "Linnaeus Forgets", by Fred Chappell
- "Novelty", by John Crowley
- "Mr. Fiddlehead", by Jonathan Carroll
- "Family", by Joyce Carol Oates
- "The Last Feast of Harlequin", by Thomas Ligotti
- "A Short Guide to the City", by Peter Straub
- "The General Who Is Dead", by Jeff VanderMeer
- "That Feeling, You Can Only Say What It Is in French", by Stephen King
- "Sea Oak", by George Saunders
- "The Long Hall on the Top Floor", by Caitlín R. Kiernan
- "Nocturne", by Thomas Tessier
- "The God of Dark Laughter", by Michael Chabon
- "Pop Art", by Joe Hill
- "Pansu", by Poppy Z. Brite
- "Dangerous Laughter", by Steven Millhauser
- "The Chambered Fruit", by M. Rickert
- "The Wavering Knife", by Brian Evenson
- "Stone Animals", by Kelly Link
- "Pat Moore", by Tim Powers
- "The Little Stranger", by Gene Wolfe
- "Dial Tone", by Benjamin Percy
