= Koko (novel) =

1988 novel by Peter Straub

- First edition cover
- Author: Peter Straub
- Language: English
- Series: Blue Rose Trilogy
- Genre: Mystery, thriller, horror
- Publisher: Dutton
- Publication date: 1988
- Publication place: United States
- Media type: Print
- Pages: 562 (hardcover)
- ISBN: 0-525-24660-6
- OCLC: 17618882
- Dewey Decimal: 813/.54 19
- LC Class: PS3569.T6914 K6 1988
- Preceded by: None
- Followed by: Mystery

Koko is a horror-mystery novel by American writer Peter Straub, first published in the United States in 1988 by EP Dutton, and in Great Britain by Viking. It was the winner of the World Fantasy Award for Best Novel in 1989.

== Plot summary ==
In the early 1980s, a series of ritualistic murders take place in Southeast Asia in which the victims have their eyes and ears removed, and are each found with a playing card placed in their mouth bearing the word "KOKO". During a reunion of veterans at the Vietnam Memorial in Washington, D.C., four survivors of a doomed platoon—Michael Poole (a grief-stricken pediatrician), Tina Pumo (owner of a Vietnamese restaurant), Conor Linklater (an itinerant construction worker) and Harry Beevers (an opportunistic lawyer)—gather to discuss the killings. Because the word "Koko" holds special significance to their old platoon, and because the killings recall the events in books he has written, the men believe that the killer is Tim Underhill, another member of their platoon who disappeared years earlier. Beevers convinces the men to help him track down Underhill.

While Pumo remains in New York City, Beevers, Poole and Linklater travel to Asia in search of Underhill. The trio fail to find Underhill in Singapore but are given several leads which send Poole and Linklater to Bangkok and Beevers to Taipei. While wandering around a residential area of Bangkok, Poole comes across Underhill at a small neighborhood fair and realizes that he is too stable and good-natured to be the killer. Underhill agrees to return to the U.S. to help in the pursuit. He, Poole and Linklater reunite with Beevers in San Francisco before returning to New York together. Meanwhile, the killer travels to the U.S. himself and murders Pumo in his apartment. Tina's girlfriend, Maggie Lah, comes across the scene and narrowly escapes the killer's clutches.

The group, now including Maggie, deduce that the killer is Victor Spitalny, a member of the platoon who vanished in Bangkok following the death of another soldier, Manny Dengler, after the war. Poole, Underhill and Maggie travel to Milwaukee and speak to Spitalny's parents. Learning that he and Dengler went to school together, they speak to several of their old classmates. Poole learns from one of them that Dengler was physically and sexually abused by his parents. From this, he realizes that Dengler assumed Spitalny's identity after murdering him and is the killer they are chasing. When the group returns to New York, Underhill is arrested thanks to an anonymous tip to police by Beevers, who wants to capture the killer alone and take all the credit for himself. Underhill is released when Poole shares his findings with the arresting officer.

The group tracks Beevers and Dengler to Chinatown, but split up when they realize the police are trailing them. Poole, Linklater and Underhill find Beevers, who has been captured and bound by Dengler. Dengler smashes a lightbulb, throwing the group into darkness as the police begin to negotiate for their release. Dengler stabs Poole and Underhill, and takes Underhill's jacket so that he can easily pass for Underhill himself in the dim light. After Poole alerts the police that he is not Underhill, Dengler murders one of the officers and escapes. He flees to Honduras and is never heard from again. Underhill narrates the end of the story, imagining Dengler's first few days in Honduras and the constant anxiety that would come with them.

== Creation ==
After the success of Ghost Story, Straub struggled to generate a plot that would prove just as financially successful without being derivative of that work. He settled on the idea of Koko's murderous Vietnam veteran, and then wrote and re-wrote, ultimately completing the project after four years. Straub has described Koko as being "emotionally richer" than any of his prior works. He says that while writing it, he tried to mimic the "transparent" and "antiseptic" style of two stories from his collection Houses Without Doors: "Blue Rose" and "The Juniper Tree".

Koko shares characters with several of Straub's other works. The character of Timothy Underhill, for example, subsequently reappeared in the novels The Throat, Lost Boy, Lost Girl, and In the Night Room, and he was mentioned in Mystery. A short prequel to Koko, the short story "The Ghost Village", was also published in Straub's 2000 collection Magic Terror. The town of Milburn, which was the primary setting of Ghost Story, is briefly featured in Koko. The character of Harry Beevers also appears as a teenager and central character in Straub's novella, Blue Rose.

== Reception ==
Lucius Shepard, writing for The Washington Post, gave Koko a favorable review, declaring that "the pacing of the novel and the eloquence of its best scenes achieve a momentum that overwhelms its flaws and, overall, Koko is vastly entertaining, often brilliantly written, full of finely realized moments and miniatures of characterization."

The Los Angeles Times also reviewed Koko positively, calling its story "engrossing" and "blood-chilling." It urged readers not to dismiss Koko as "just another serial killer tale."

The New York Times Book Review described Koko as "a long novel that is complexly plotted and thickly layered" which "seems to be a whodunit, then turns into a whydunit, then back again to a whodunit." The review concluded with the observation that "[i]n this fable of men undone by the ultimate horror, evil is anything but banal."

In a mixed review, The Chicago Tribune described Koko as Straub's "most ambitious work thus far, though not his most successful. [...] His story is too close to the truth to be make believe and never well-enough imagined to be true. Koko is hardly a failure, but is not the book one hoped it would be, either."

Kirkus delivered a negative review, stating that "the characters remain static" and that "the twists hold no punch" before ending it with "an honorable, mighty failure."

The Baltimore Sun also reviewed Koko unfavorably, dubbing it a "sleep-inducing effort from a man who seems as though he would rather be doing something else." The critic opines that the "main character is boring and bland, [Straub's] atmosphere is lacking, and his settings are unconvincing. His style is so awkward that too often I found myself rereading many sentences just to make sure that I was clear on what he was trying to say."
