= Shadowland (Straub novel) =

1980 novel by Peter Straub

- Author: Peter Straub
- Language: English
- Genre: Dark fantasy, horror, fantasy
- Published: 1980
- Publisher: Coward, McCann & Geoghegan
- Publication place: United States
- Media type: Print
- Pages: 417
- ISBN: 978-0698110458

Shadowland is a horror/fantasy novel by American writer Peter Straub, first published in 1980 by Coward, McCann & Geoghegan. It is a horror novel that has strong elements of fantasy and magic. The book chronicles the tale of two teenage boys and their adventure in the mysterious and dangerous Shadowland where reality and illusions are intertwined. It was the first book Straub wrote following his highly successful Ghost Story.

== Background ==
Straub recalls that the book had its origins in fairy tales he told his son: "Nightly, stories poured out of me, as from an inexhaustible source. I had no idea where they were going when I started them, but along the way they always turned into real stories, with beginnings, middles, and ends, complete with hesitations, digressions, puzzles, and climaxes. This was thrilling. My little boy was entranced, and I felt as though I had tapped into the pure, ancient well, the source of narrative, the spring water that nourished me and everyone like me... Traditional fairy tales, which I began to investigate soon after I started making up my own, pervade this novel. The beautiful story called 'The King of the Cats' is the novel in miniature." Another influence was John Fowles's The Magus, "which suggested a way to unite the powerful strangeness resulting from the oral tradition with more conventional narrative satisfactions."

The first part of the novel takes place at Carson, an Arizona prep school which is a thinly disguised version of Milwaukee Country Day School, which Straub attended. The main action takes place at the eponymous Shadowland, in Vermont.

== Plot summary ==
The story is presented in the first person, with the narrator recounting events told to him years later by his old friend Tom Flanagan, whom he unexpectedly meets in a nightclub.

Years earlier, Tom and another boy, Del Nightingale, attend the prestigious all-boys private school Carson. As freshmen, they run afoul of a senior, Steve “Skeleton” Ridpath, an antisocial and unstable student. Both Tom and Skeleton experience vivid nightmares involving a mysterious figure watching them and a vulture hovering overhead—images that appear to be strangely connected to Del’s childhood. Del, who has a deep fascination with stage magic, shares his knowledge with Tom, quickly drawing him into the craft and demonstrating remarkable skill.

During an away football game, Skeleton steals an expensive artifact from the opposing school, leading to intense interrogations of the Carson students by the principal. It is eventually discovered that Skeleton has hidden the item, along with several papers, inside a piano bench—explaining his hostility toward anyone who approached it. Del later finds the artifact and destroys it but does not reveal Skeleton’s guilt, and the incident gradually fades from attention.

Tom and Del go on to perform a magic show for the school. At the climax of their act, a fire breaks out in the auditorium, resulting in the death of a student, fellow freshman Dave Brick. The younger students question Skeleton’s whereabouts during the fire while mourning their loss. That summer, Tom learns that his father has died of cancer. He is invited to spend the summer at Del’s uncle’s estate, Shadowland, and, feeling a need to look after Del, he accepts.

During their train journey to Vermont, Del explains that his uncle is a renowned magician who has taught him real magic and intends to teach Tom as well. He also confesses that he had used his abilities to influence Skeleton into stealing the artifact, hoping it would lead to his suspension—though the plan ultimately failed. At one point, Tom encounters a train compartment that had not been there before and briefly sees Skeleton inside, before he vanishes. Although the train is delayed by a crash, Tom and Del eventually arrive safely at their destination, albeit several hours late.

Arriving in Vermont, Tom meets Del's uncle, Coleman Collins, an evident alcoholic. Collins introduces Tom to Shadowland, and prepares them for the summer. As Collins performs trickery on the boys, warping their sense of time and space, he recounts his past as a World War I soldier and nurse and how he acquired his magical persona. Tom seems to run into Collins randomly around Shadowland, who disturbs Tom with cryptic messages about Tom's future as the “King of the Cats.” Del becomes jealous of Tom as Del is isolated from everyone, but the two reconcile as Tom schemes to make Del the future ruler of Shadowland, not wanting the position to be handed to him.

Also in Shadowland are the Wandering Boys, a group of burly men who acted as Collins’ bodyguards during the War, and Rose Armstrong, a mysterious fifteen year old who stays on the lake. Rose confides to Tom that Collins is manipulating the boys against each other and she wishes to escape to rescue the two of them. The two begin to fall in love with each other, meeting up at night to discuss ways to escape and express their love. Over time Tom is able to convince Del that Collins is psychopathic.

Collins finishes the tale of his past to Tom and Del. As a medic, Collins was forced to mercy kill a fellow soldier who was grievously injured. Believing he had become the man he murdered, Collins suffered from multiple personality disorder, and ran away from the war to perform in magic shows around Europe. While traveling he was invited by Speckle John, another magician, to join his group, and began dating Rosa Forte, and hired the Wandering Boys, becoming a massively successful group. Collins also mastered an entity known as the Collector, a receptacle that Collins used to murder any competitors after possessing them. After catching Speckle John making love to Rosa Forte, Collins left the group after taking away Speckle John's powers. Tom realizes Collins is grooming him to become Collins successor.

Rose guides Tom and Del to an underground tunnel system that leads them out of Shadowland. While walking, they are spotted and chased by the Wandering Boys. Rose tricks the boys by taking them back to Collins manor. Collins decides to start his final performance early, crucifying Tom in the main stage and letting the Wandering Boys mercilessly beat Del. Tom awakens and meets the spirit of Speckle John, who was reincarnated as Del's butler, who mentally pushes Tom to escape. Tom shoots and kills some of the Wandering Boys, and rescues Del from the rest of them. They are joined by Rose, a reincarnation of Rosa Forte, who admits that Collins manipulated her as well as she believed leading them back would save them. The three prepare to face off against Collins.

The Collector, possessing Skeleton, arrives and pursues the trio. Del is kidnapped by Collins, Rose runs away and hides and Tom is momentarily killed by the Collector. Tom is able to rip Skeleton from the Collector and lets him walk away alive. Tom and Rose barge into Collins room. He expresses disappointment in Tom, deeming him a failure, and turns Del into a bird before disappearing. Tom follows Collins around the manor before he kills Del by turning him into stone. The two fight, with Tom trapping Collins inside the Collector and sending him away. Tom burns the house down and leaves with Rose, where they sleep on the lakeshore before she disappears in the morning, inferring that Rose is a mermaid. Tom sets the statue of Del on the lake before leaving Shadowland.

In the present, after interviewing others that Tom Flanagan knew, the narrator meets an older Skeleton at a monastery who seems to have no recollection of the events of the story. The narrator visits the town where Shadowland resides in and visits to find nothing, but stumbles on a brick, realizing that the estate has fully burned down, confirming Tom's story.

== Allusions ==
The title, Shadowland, comes from the writings of C. S. Lewis. The novel's epigraphs are from Charles Dickens and John Barth. From the former: "Little Red Riding Hood was my first love. I felt that if I could have married Little Red Riding Hood, I should have known perfect bliss." Straub's Rose Armstrong resembles Little Red Riding Hood, and also Hans Christian Andersen's the Little Mermaid. The quote from Barth is "The key to the treasure is the treasure." Barth's work often contained elements of metafiction, as does Shadowland. The epigraph for Part Two comes from Roger Sale's Fairy Tales and After: "We are back at the foot of the great narrative tree, where stories can go...anywhere." Grady Hendrix notes that the magic system Straub uses is the same as in Dungeons and Dragons.

== Reception ==
Grady Hendrix said he wondered what Harry Potter would be like if J. K. Rowling had written it for adults, and writes "Fortunately for me, Peter Straub already wrote a literary fiction version of Harry Potter when he wrote Shadowland, 17 years before Harry Potter and the Philosopher’s Stone was even published, way back when JK Rowling was only 15 years old...Rowling’s books leap along, bounding from incident to incident, leavened with humor and character business. Straub’s Shadowland twists itself into its own guts, burrowing deeper into its own dark workings, full of carnage, blood, pain, fairy tales, and occasional flashes of joy and wonder. Stories are nested inside flashbacks which are contained within larger stories. And both authors, surprisingly, wind up in similar places."
