= If You Could See Me Now =

If You Could See Me Now may refer to:

- "If You Could See Me Now" (1946 song), a 1946 jazz standard, composed by Tadd Dameron
- "If You Could See Me Now", a 1992 song by Celine Dion from Celine Dion
- "If You Could See Me Now" (The Script song), 2013
- If You Could See Me Now (Etta Jones album), 1979
- If You Could See Me Now (Kenny Drew album), 1974
- If You Could See Me Now (Oscar Peterson album), 1983
- If You Could See Me Now (Straub novel), 1977 novel by Peter Straub
- If You Could See Me Now (Ahern novel), 2005 novel by Cecelia Ahern
