= The Talisman (comics) =

- Cover to The Talisman: The Road of Trials #1

Publication information
- Publisher: Del Rey
- Format: Ongoing series
- Publication date: July, 2009 – March, 2010
- No. of issues: 06

Creative team
- Created by: Stephen King & Peter Straub
- Written by: Robin Furth
- Penciller: Tony Shasteen
- Letterer: Bill Tortolini
- Colorist: Nei Ruffino

The Talisman is a comic book adaptation published by Del Rey of the novel of the same name written by Stephen King and Peter Straub.

The first issue, a limited edition #0, was released at Comic-Con in July 2009. This prequel issue was published in non-limited release on October 21, 2009. The script is by Robin Furth, pencils/inks by Tony Shasteen, colors by Nei Ruffino and JD Mettler, and lettering by Bill Tortolini. The cover art work is by Massimo Carnevale. A hardcover collection has been published on May 4, 2010. (ISBN 978-0345517982)

The second story arc, The Talisman: A Collision of Worlds was announced for release in June 2010 but was put on hold by the publishers and has yet to be released.

== Story arcs ==
| # | Title | Issues | Dates |
|---|---|---|---|
| 1 | The Talisman: The Road of Trials | 6 (#0-#5) | July, 2009—March 5, 2010 |
