= Mr. X (novel) =

1999 novel by Peter Straub

- First edition
- Author: Peter Straub
- Language: English
- Genre: Horror, mystery
- Published: July 20, 1999
- Publisher: Random House
- Publication place: United States
- Pages: 482 (first edition)
- Awards: 1999 Bram Stoker Award
- ISBN: 0-679-40138-5
- OCLC: 40150621

Mr. X is a 1999 horror mystery novel by American writer Peter Straub. The book won the 1999 Bram Stoker Award for Best Novel and was shortlisted for the 2001 British Fantasy Award for Best Novel (August Derleth Award).

The novel is a tribute to H. P. Lovecraft.

== Synopsis ==
The novel tells the story of Ned Dunstan, a computer programmer with an odd past that he finds himself constantly questioning. Every year on his birthday, Ned is cursed with visions of horror committed by a savage figure he calls "Mr. X." Now, as his 35th birthday approaches, Ned has been drawn back to his home town of Edgerton, Illinois, by a premonition that his mother is dying. His mother reveals the identity of his mysterious father and warns him of grave danger. Ignoring the warnings, Ned explores his dark past and the astonishing legacy of his kin, driving the case to a sinister turn as it appears he may or may not have a devious doppelgänger responsible for gruesome murders. Soon, Ned is accused of crimes he couldn't possibly have committed, while he enters a hidden world of ominous mysteries, where he must confront his deepest nightmares.

== See also ==
- 1999 in literature
- Mrs. God (novel)
