= Other Worlds Than These =

Novel by Stephen King

- First edition cover
- Author: Stephen King; Peter Straub
- Audio read by: Patton Oswalt Stephen King - Afterword
- Illustrator: Gabriel Rodríguez
- Language: English
- Series: Jack Sawyer Trilogy
- Publisher: Scribner
- Publication date: October 6, 2026
- Publication place: United States
- Media type: Print (hardcover), e-book, audiobook
- Pages: 691
- ISBN: 978-1-66823-309-2 (First edition hardcover)
- Preceded by: Black House

Other Worlds Than These is a 2026 fantasy novel by Stephen King and Peter Straub, formerly referred to under its working title Talisman 3. It is the third and final book in a series formed by the 1984 novel The Talisman and its 2001 sequel Black House. Straub died in 2022 and King wrote the novel alone but using material prepared by Straub. Esquire published the first excerpt from the novel on February 9, 2026, and the book itself was published on October 6, 2026.

== Background ==
At a signing of Black House, published in 2001, Straub stated that work on a third book would commence in "around five years". In October 2004 King wrote on his official website: "People who are interested in Jack Sawyer [the protagonist of the series], don’t lose hope that you will see him again." Around the same time, Straub also confirmed in an interview that a third book was forthcoming. In November 2005, Straub stated in an interview that work on the third novel could begin in four or five years (2010). In October 2006, in an interview with Time magazine, Straub said:

Steve and I agreed years back that we would do a third one, and that would be it, because Black House virtually sets up, and all but promises a follow-up. And then we would have a three-volume fantasy novel. That's perfect. That's probably what it wanted to be from the beginning.

In April 2009 King stated that the two collaborators "will probably write the third and last Talisman book in one or two years" (2011). In an interview with Cemetery Dance, Straub said:

We were going to start right about now, but King got sidetracked by a Broadway musical that he was writing with John Mellencamp. So that's been taking shape. And I think they were having out-of-town tryouts this autumn. Then we'll see what happens. But at some point we'll get back to it, because we have to. It's like two-thirds of a long, long story, and the other part really should be done.

In December 2009, Straub stated via his Twitter: "And for those who care, no worries. In about a year [King] and I will begin planning a new book. It will be the third and last volume in the Jack Sawyer trilogy." Doing a YouTube interview for reddit in February 2010, Straub once again confirmed a third book:

Steve and I agreed [...] three years ago that we would in all likelihood write a third book, the last of the Jack Sawyer novels. In a way, though, it was there from the beginning, at least the ending of Black House, because the ending of Black House opens up into another narrative altogether. The protagonist is given a wonderful but profound problem, and he will have to cope with that problem. And it practically writes another book by itself. It doesn't, I assure you, but it does kind of tell us what one of central issues of that novel will be. I think we'll begin in a year or so. It doesn't have a title.

In late October 2013, Straub emailed King and wrote, "Dear Steve, Sometime last year I bought an evocative, rather haunted-feeling book called Redheaded Peckerwood." The message continued, “What if a series of motiveless, brutal crimes had been committed in the Far West of the Territories?”

Christian Patterson’s Redheaded Peckerwood was inspired by the late 1950s killing spree of Charles Starkweather and Caril Ann Fugate, which mainly occurred in Nebraska. Stephen King's character "The Kid" in The Stand (1978) was also inspired by Charles Starkweather. As a boy, King kept a scrapbook containing newspaper clippings related to Starkweather and Fugate. In 2000 interview with The Guardian, King said, "And I do think that the very first time I saw a picture of him, I knew I was looking at the future. His eyes were a double zero. There was just nothing there. He was like an outrider of What America might become."

In February 2012, Stephen King's assistant noted that both authors had other projects and haven not been able to coordinate their schedules as of yet to work on the novel. In July 2012, Straub commented that "plans for the third book have gone no further than before". This was later confirmed by Stephen King's assistant in February 2013. In May 2014, Peter Straub stated at a signing that the authors "have an idea of a story" and "it won't be too much longer". In November 2014, during a book reading event in support of his new novel Revival, Stephen King said that he and Straub are currently planning the new Jack Sawyer book and hope to write it in 2015. In an interview with the Miami Herald in March 2016, Straub revealed that the writing was supposed to begin three or four years previous (circa 2012), but for health reasons and work schedule it never did; however, he noted that work on the book may begin in one or two years time. In a 2021 appearance on the Dead Headspace podcast, Straub said that due to his health, it was unlikely that he would co-write a third Talisman with King. Straub died in 2022.

In August 2023, King had expressed the possibility of finally writing the third installment of The Talisman series despite the passing of Peter Straub, saying: "Before he died, Peter sent me this long letter and said we oughta do the third one, and he gave me a really cool idea and I had some ideas of my own." In June 2024, King spoke about at last beginning work on the book in 2024, saying he re-read The Talisman in order to take notes and plans to re-read Black House. In several posts on Threads in January 2025, King confirmed he was writing the new novel, referred to as Talisman 3. In July 2025, King noted on Threads that the novel was "almost done".

The official title, cover art, and other publishing details were unveiled on February 7, 2026. On June 18, 2026, King read two excerpts on Scribner's YouTube channel. The book contains 38 black-and-white illustrations drawn by Gabriel Rodriguez, who had previously worked with King drawing pictures for his previous book Fairy Tale.
