= Milwaukee Country Day School =

Former country day school in Whitefish Bay, Wisconsin, United States

Coordinates: 43°07′59.9″N 87°54′25.0″W

Milwaukee Country Day School (MCD) was a country day school in Whitefish Bay, Wisconsin, United States. It operated under the headmastership of A. Gledden Santer. The school was begun in 1911 and operated as a boys-only school until 1958, when girls were admitted. According to alumnus Henry Reuss, "Country Day, with its Church of England prayers, its 'body sports' and its Latin studies, marked the general de-Germanization of Milwaukee culture which occurred in the 1920s."

In 1964, the school merged with two other local day schools (Milwaukee University School and Milwaukee-Downer Seminary) to become the University School of Milwaukee. MCD's facilities became the South Campus of the new school, which operated until it closed in 1985. The campus is now the home of the Milwaukee Jewish Day School and the Harry & Rose Samson Family Jewish Community Center.

The school appears in the novel Shadowland by alumnus Peter Straub.

== Notable alumni ==
- William Kasik, Republican member of the Wisconsin State Assembly
- Fred Miller, president of the Miller Brewing Company
- John R. Meyer (legislator), Republican member of the Wisconsin State Assembly
- Henry Reuss, Democratic member of Congress
- James Sensenbrenner, Republican member of Congress
- Brooks Stevens, industrial design pioneer
- Peter Straub, horror novelist
