= Ghost Story (1981 film) =

1981 film by John Irvin

- Theatrical release poster
- Directed by: John Irvin
- Screenplay by: Lawrence D. Cohen
- Based on: Ghost Story by Peter Straub
- Produced by: Burt Weissbourd
- Starring: Fred Astaire; Melvyn Douglas; Douglas Fairbanks Jr.; John Houseman; Craig Wasson; Patricia Neal; Alice Krige
- Cinematography: Jack Cardiff
- Edited by: Tom Rolf
- Music by: Philippe Sarde
- Production company: Universal Pictures
- Distributed by: Universal Pictures
- Release date: December 18, 1981
- Running time: 110 minutes
- Country: United States
- Language: English
- Budget: $13.5 million
- Box office: $23.4 million

Ghost Story is a 1981 American supernatural horror film directed by John Irvin from a screenplay by Lawrence D. Cohen, based on Peter Straub's 1979 novel, and starring Fred Astaire, Melvyn Douglas, Douglas Fairbanks Jr., John Houseman, Craig Wasson, and Alice Krige. The film follows a group of elderly New England businessmen who gather during a frigid winter storm to recount their complicity in a woman's disappearance and death decades prior after one of them suspects her ghost has been haunting him.

This was the final feature film for Astaire, final film for Fairbanks, the final completed film for Douglas and the first film to feature Michael O'Neill. Ghost Story was shot in Woodstock, Vermont; Saratoga Springs, New York; and at Stetson University in DeLand, Florida.

The film was released in the United States by Universal Pictures on December 18, 1981. It received mixed-to-negative reviews from critics, but was a commercial success, and has since developed a moderate cult following.

== Plot ==
During the frigid winter of 1979, in the small New England town of Milburn, four elderly friends—businessman Ricky Hawthorne, lawyer Sears James, physician John Jaffrey, and Mayor Edward Charles Wanderley—form the Chowder Society, an informal men's club who get together weekly to share tales of horror. Edward's son David, living in New York City, falls to his death from his apartment window after seeing a girl he's been sleeping with turn into a living corpse. His other son, Don, comes home at Edward's request. After David's funeral, Edward sees him walking through town during a snowstorm and follows him to a bridge, where he disappears. Calling out to his dead son, Edward sees a female apparition and he falls to his death. Two escaped patients from a mental asylum, Gregory and Fenny Bate, have taken up residence in the old Eva Galli house, now in ruins.

Doubting his father committed suicide, Don approaches the remaining three friends and tells them a "ghost" story to gain membership into the Chowder Society. In a flashback, Don tells the story of how he, a college professor in Florida, began an affair with a mysterious secretary named Alma. Alma wanted to marry Don in his home town of Milburn but he was reluctant. Don suspected something was wrong with Alma when he touched her one night and realized she was as cold as a corpse. Don broke things off with a furious Alma, who disappeared. He fell into a depression, costing him his reputation and his job. A month later, Don called David and learned to his horror that David was now engaged to marry Alma. David's brother scoffed at his warnings. Don then shows the three elders an old photograph he's found among his father's possessions, showing a young woman who looks identical to Alma. John, realizing what has happened, pleads with his friends to tell the truth but is rebuffed.

The next day, John has a nightmare about Alma and dies of a heart attack. Sears and Ricky explain to Don that in the spring of 1929, the four friends became smitten with a flirtatious young woman named Eva Galli. Edward first took her to bed but he was sexually impotent. Outside her house, the other three friends serenaded Eva in hopes of catching a glimpse of her. Edward came to the window instead, giving the impression he'd slept with her. After the four went out and became drunk, they returned to the house and all but Sears danced with Eva. When it was proposed that they leave, Sears suggestively insisted on getting his dance. Eva began to tell them the truth about her dalliance with Edward when he leapt to silence her, causing her to smash her head on a stone mantelpiece. Assuming Eva to be dead, they loaded her body into her car and pushed it into a nearby pond. As the car descended, Eva stirred inside, screaming and hammering at the back window as the car sank.

In the present, Ricky and Don conclude Alma and Eva are the same woman and her ghost has returned for revenge. They go to confront Eva's ghost in her old house where Don falls through the rotting stairs and breaks his leg. Sears leaves Don and Ricky behind when he drives into a snowstorm to seek help. When he sees Eva's apparition, he swerves off the road and is attacked and killed by Fenny Bate, one of Eva's accomplices.

Ricky realizes something has happened to Sears and leaves to get help. He is picked up by Gregory Bate, who tells him of Eva's plans for them both, but Ricky stabs him and escapes. Ricky tells the authorities to pull Eva's car up from the lake to reveal her body inside as Don confronts the rotting specter of Alma/Eva. Ricky and the authorities drag out the car and wrench open the rusted door. The rotting corpse of Eva falls harmlessly to the ground. With the truth about Eva now known, Don is spared from her vengeance and the town is restored to peace.

== Cast ==
- Fred Astaire as Ricky Hawthorne
  - Tim Choate as Young Hawthorne
- Melvyn Douglas as Dr. John Jaffrey
  - Mark Chamberlin as Young Jaffrey
- Douglas Fairbanks Jr. as Edward Charles Wanderley
  - Kurt Johnson as Young Wanderley
- John Houseman as Sears James
  - Ken Olin as Young James
- Craig Wasson as Don & David Wanderley
- Patricia Neal as Stella Hawthorne
- Alice Krige as Eva Galli / Alma Mobley
- Jacqueline Brookes as Milly Jaffrey
- Miguel Fernandes as Gregory Bate
- Lance Holcomb as Fenny Bate
- Brad Sullivan as Sheriff Hardesty
- Michael O'Neill as Churchill
- Guy Boyd as Omar Norris
- Robin Curtis as Rea Dedham
- James Greene as Mailman
- Ken Simpson as College Student

== Production ==
=== Conception ===
Universal Pictures had purchased the rights to Peter Straub's novel, Ghost Story, in 1978 for $225,000. English director John Irvin was asked to direct the film by producer Burt Weissbourd on the basis of his direction of Haunted: The Ferryman, a British television film. Upon reading Straub's novel and Lawrence D. Cohen's screenplay, Irvin envisioned the narrative as being about hypocrisy and principally "men's fear of women, and at some point, hatred." Irvin, who was a newcomer in Hollywood, hired several British film makers as part of his team and stated that the film's cinematography was intended to be "European" in appearance and to "look like a Christmas card".

=== Filming ===
Principal photography took place in Saratoga Springs, New York and Woodstock, Vermont, beginning in January 1981. Interiors of the abandoned home in the film were crafted inside the former Union Station in Albany, New York, while shooting for the Florida-based scenes was completed in Deland and New Smyrna Beach, Florida; scenes set in New York City were shot on location (in Waterside Plaza). Additional photography took place at Universal Studios in Los Angeles, California.

According to Irvin, the filming process was emotionally turbulent for star Fred Astaire, who confided in Irvin that he felt he was going to die or be murdered while shooting the film, and at one point considered dropping out of the production. But it was, in fact, co-star Melvyn Douglas who died about four months before the film was released.

At least two different, unused endings were shot for the film: one in which Don sees an apparition of David on a bus, and another where Don, Ricky and Stella meet at Eva's graveside, and Fenny Bate makes a reappearance. Still photos and script excerpts from the unused endings were later included on the Shout Factory Blu-ray release.

=== Special makeup effects ===
The film's prosthetic makeup effects were designed by artist Dick Smith. Smith and a team of artists (including Rick Baker and Carl Fullerton) created multiple life-sized puppets of Eva/Alma in different stages of decay.

Smith also created a "faceless" dummy with a gaping mouth and no eyes that was to be used as an apparition of Eva, but it ultimately was not included in the final film. The "eyeless apparition" design was later used in nearly two decades later in a hallucination sequence in the 1999 film House on Haunted Hill, with Smith receiving credit for the design.

== Release ==
Universal Pictures vied for a Christmastime release for the film based on its wintry setting, and had originally slated a tentative release date of December 11, 1981. Advance test screenings were held between October 9 and 11, 1981, in Denver, Colorado and Boston, Massachusetts. The film opened in the United States with a wide release two months later on December 18, 1981. Limited engagement screenings of the film took place on December 16, 1981.

=== Home media ===
Ghost Story was released on DVD on March 25, 1998, by Image Entertainment. Universal repressed the DVD with an alternate cover art, which was released September 7, 2004. The film received its first Blu-ray release in the United States on November 24, 2015, by Scream Factory. This release featured new bonus material, including an audio commentary with director John Irvin, as well as interviews with Peter Straub, Alice Krige, Lawrence D. Cohen, Burt Weissbourd, and Bill Taylor.

Second Sight Films also released a Blu-ray edition in the United Kingdom.

== Reception ==
=== Box office ===
Ghost Story earned $2,105,729 during its opening weekend in the United States, screening at 548 theaters. The film grossed a total of $23,371,905 at the United States box office, and was the third-highest grossing horror film of 1981 and the 39th-highest grosser of the year.

=== Critical response ===
Critical reception was mixed to negative upon release. On the review aggregator website Rotten Tomatoes, 28% of 32 critics' reviews are positive. The website's consensus reads: "Director John Irvin wastes the efforts of a tremendously talented cast, making this one Ghost Story that deserves to be drowned out by boos."

Roger Ebert gave the film a favorable review, praising the performances and considering it an improvement on Straub's novel. In The New York Times, Vincent Canby had the opposite view, also praising the performances but feeling that the movie oversimplified Straub's story and themes. He also criticized the central mystery and revelation as "humdrum" and anticlimactic after a strong build-up. Variety agreed with Canby that the filmmakers failed to translate Straub's novel to screen, stating that there were "isolated and excellent moments separated by artful but ordinary sketches." Rex Reed of the New York Daily News similarly noted the film's cast as "wasted," and lambasted the film as a "horrible" adaptation of the source novel. Gene Siskel, writing for the Chicago Tribune, felt the male leads "overacted" the material, though he did praise Alice Krige's performance.

The Time Out film guide deemed it a "disastrous distillation of Peter Straub's overrated but at least tolerably coherent novel." TV Guide awarded the film two out of four stars, criticizing Cohen's screenplay, but adding: "Director John Irvin does manage to evoke some mood and atmosphere from the snowy New England setting, and the performances from the four veteran lead players are enjoyable."

=== Accolades ===
Award/association	Year	Category	Subject	Result	Ref.
Avoriaz Fantastic Film Festival	1982	Grand Prize	John Irvin	Nominated	
Saturn Awards	1982	Best Horror Film		Nominated	
Stinkers Bad Movie Awards	1982	Least "Special" Special Effects		Nominated	

== See also ==
- List of ghost films

== Sources ==
- Fonseca, Anthony; Pulliam, June Michele, eds. (2016). Ghosts in Popular Culture and Legend. Santa Barbara, California: ABC-Clio. ISBN 979-8-216-08998-8.
- Irvin, John (2015). Ghost Story (Audio commentary, Blu-ray). Scream Factory. OCLC 933565158.
