= Mystery (novel) =

1990 novel by Peter Straub

- First edition
- Author: Peter Straub
- Cover artist: Paul Bacon
- Language: English
- Series: Blue Rose Trilogy
- Genre: Crime
- Published: 1990
- Publisher: Dutton
- Publication place: United States
- Media type: Print
- Pages: 548
- Awards: 1993 Bram Stoker Award
- ISBN: 978-0-5252-4818-7
- OCLC: 19555495
- Dewey Decimal: 813.54
- LC Class: PS3569.T6914
- Preceded by: Koko
- Followed by: The Throat

Mystery is a 1990 novel by American author Peter Straub, the second installment in Straub's loosely connected "Blue Rose Trilogy". The novel falls into the genre of crime fiction. It was preceded by Koko and followed by The Throat. The book was published by Dutton, won the 1993 Bram Stoker Award, and was a 1994 WFA nominee

== Synopsis ==
In the 1950s, Tom Pasmore is a young boy who lives on Mill Walk, a Caribbean island mostly inhabited by wealthy American and German expatriates. He read a newspaper article about a woman named Jeanine Thielman, who was murdered and then dumped in a lake. A few years later, Tom explores a dilapidated neighborhood on the island called Calle Burleigh. Hearing the cries of an animal, he finds a teenaged boy named Jerry and his older sister Robyn. When Tom says that he wants to go home, Jerry attacks him. Tom escapes but is followed by two boys, Robbie and Nappy, who threaten him with knives. They chase Tom into the street, where he is hit by a car and severely injured. While he recuperates in the hospital, Tom is visited by Lamont von Heilitz, an elderly neighbor who has taken an odd interest in him. Lamont is rumored to have been a celebrated detective in the 1930s.

By early 1962, Tom has become obsessed with recent homicides in Mill Walk and makes a scrapbook profiling each one. Tom sees Lamont at the scene of one such murder, that of Marita Hasselgard. Ignoring his father's warning to stay away from Lamont, Tom visits his residence the next day. The two bond over their passion for solving murders without the aid of police; Tom correctly deduces that Marita's brother, Friedrich, was responsible for her murder. Lamont shares with Tom a case he has been following: the murder of Jeanine Thielman. Lamont believes Thielman was murdered by her lover, Anton Goetz, when she refused to continue seeing him. Tom departs from Lamont's house, taking Lamont's journal with him. Through the journal, Tom finds out that Lamont has been following the careers of those involved with the Thielman case.

Over the next few days, Gloria Pasmore begins to show signs of mental illness. Friedrich Hasselgard, Marita's never-suspected murderer, is lost at sea while boating. Foxhall Edwardes, a suspect in Marita's murder, is killed in a shootout with two police officers, Mendenhall and Klink, at almost the same time. Mendenhall and Klink are both seriously injured and are committed to Shady Mount. Tom then learns that his own grandfather, Glendenning Upshaw, heard the gunshots that killed Marita on the night it happened. Dennis Handley begins to show concern for Tom at school, and Tom begins to grow closer to Sarah Spence, the classmate who visited him in the hospital. However, she is dating Buddy Redwing, another student at the school.

Tom and Gloria visit Glen at his house and are greeted by Glen and his two butlers, Mr. and Mrs. Kingsley. Dr. Bonaventure Milton is also there, though he departs soon after Tom and Gloria arrive, speaking of a problem at the hospital where he works concerning Nancy Vetiver, one of the nurses who used to visit Tom when he was incapacitated. Glen prompts Tom to go to Eagle Lake for the summer, where Jeanine was killed, as it is a beautiful camping site and tourist attraction. Tom agrees to go.

Sarah Spence grows distant from her boyfriend Buddy. Tom learns that Lamont doesn't want him to go to Eagle Lake, but Tom doesn't listen to him. Sarah and Tom walk together, and Sarah acts oddly nervous in front of Tom. After the walk, Tom sees a commotion at the hospital and enters, finding out that Mendenhall, one of the officers injured by Foxhall, has died. Tom discusses his theories with Dr. Bonaventure Milton, who disregards them.

Tom invites Sarah to go with him and speak to Hattie Bascombe, who he thinks might live at the old slave house across town. He and Sarah drive there, and on the way, he admits that he was the one who wrote the letter to Fulton Bishop. Tom and Sarah see Milton exit Hattie's home, and go inside to talk to her. She says that Milton was talking about Tom himself and telling her not to talk to him. Hattie takes the two of them to see Nancy a few blocks away, who says that she was suspended from her job at Shady Mount because she wouldn't stay away from Mendenhall while he healed, as her nursing style involves a personal connection with one's patients. Sarah and Tom return home.

At the Pasmore household, Tom becomes further detached from his parents. Tom hears on the news that Klink, the only surviving officer of the Foxhall Edwardes incident, was killed by a group of criminals when he tried to prevent them from robbing a bank. Tom visits Lamont and shares the recent events with him. Lamont informs him that he was there on Calle Burleigh the day Tom almost died.

Tom gets invited to Eagle Lake, Wisconsin, a resort for the founding families of Mill Walk. He flies there along with Sarah Spence, now engaged to Buddy, and her status-conscious parents, by private jet. After an awkward conversation between the four of them, Sarah and Tom go to the back of the plane and have sex for the first time. Tom and the Spences touch down in Grand Forks, a town near Eagle Lake. Their chauffeur is Jerry Hasek, the boy who attacked Tom when he was younger. Tom recognizes and outs him in front of the astonished Spences.

The five of them drive into the lodge complex and meet up with the Redwing clan. Tom is to stay in Glen's old cabin with his housekeeper, Barbara Deane, who used to be a nurse at Shady Mount. Tom goes into town and looks at old news articles at the library, searching for more evidence on the Jeanine Thielman case he is working on. He meets a man named Joe Truehart, and gives him a letter for Lamont. Joe doesn't mail the letter, but in fact hands it to Lamont personally, as Lamont is staying nearby to keep an eye on Tom, who is oblivious to Lamont's presence. Tom is deliberately pushed off the sidewalk and into traffic and almost killed by a speeding car, though he does not catch his attacker. He goes back to the lodge complex, and Sarah tells him that she doesn't have feelings for Buddy anymore.

The next day, Tom attends dinner with all lodge guests, including dowager Kate Redwing whom Tom asks about Jeanine Thielman. Kate tells him that she can speak about Jeanine later, but refuses to say another word on the subject during dinner. That night, Tom sees somebody creeping around Lamont's lodge with a flashlight. Unbeknownst to Tom, this person is Lamont himself.

The next morning, upon returning from his walk, Barbara Deane tells him that Ralph Redwing's bodyguards came by under Buddy's orders to deliver a message to Tom: Stay away from Sarah. Barbara drives Tom into town and tells him that Anton Goetz wasn't Jeanine's killer, because Anton had a limp. Gloria Pasmore saw a man running away from the scene the night Jeanine was killed, and the man she saw did not have a limp. While Tom is walking in town, Jerry, Robbie, and Nappy pick him up in their car. Jerry tells Tom not to mention the howling, crying dog he heard on the day Tom was hit by a car years ago. They bring Tom to Buddy, who warns him once more to stay away from Sarah. The two struggle, and Tom incapacitates Buddy before escaping. Tom talks to Sarah about Jerry and she is displeased. He then sends another letter to Lamont via Joe Truehart, and goes to see Kate Redwing at her lodge. Kate tells Tom that the man Gloria saw was not Anton Goetz, clearing Anton's name, though Tom remarks that it doesn't really matter- shortly after Jeanine's death, Anton was found hanging by his neck from a rafter in his house.

Tom has dinner with the guests again, and they treat him coldly on account of the happenings between Tom and Buddy. At the lodge, Tom calls his grandfather, Glen, and their phone call is interrupted when a bullet smashes his window and nearly kills him. Glen and the investigating officer, Spychalla (the deputy chief of police), both agree that it was a wild shot from a hunter. The next day, Tim Truehart (the chief of police), rules out Buddy Redwing as the shooter, though Tim believes that the shot wasn't wild.

The summer passes rather uneventfully after that. Tom finds countless letters from Sarah in his mailbox, as her parents have forbidden her to speak to him. Tom tries to call Sarah but Mr. and Mrs. Spence hang up on him. Their next group dinner is stressful and awkward. Later, Tom's schoolyard friend, Fritz Redwing, arrives in Grand Forks. Tom talks with Fritz and tells him about his relationship with Sarah. Despite familial pressure, Fritz supports him.

Tom goes to Barbara's house. Entering to search for her, he finds several notes from Jeanine Thielman accusing the reader of murder: "I KNOW WHAT YOU ARE... YOU MUST BE STOPPED... YOU WILL PAY FOR YOUR SIN." He also finds many newspapers accusing Barbara of several homicides over the past few years. Tom realizes that Barbara is the murderer- she killed Jeanine and then, when Anton confronted her after Lamont accused Anton of the crime, Barbara killed Anton as well and made it look like a suicide. Tom also believes that Barbara murdered Mendenhall by slipping him the wrong medication while she was on her shift at Shady Mount.

Tom, Sarah, and Fritz drive to an out-of-business shed leased by the Redwings and find Nappy surrounded by many stolen items before returning anxiously back to the lodge complex. Tom is unable to reach Glen or Lamont by phone. He calls the police station about the stolen items and they turn him down. Lamont finally makes himself known to Tom at the end of the day, and he tells Tom that Tim Truehart arrested Nappy and returned the stolen items. He also reveals to Tom that Lamont is his real father and that Gloria Upshaw, his mother, was forced to marry Victor Pasmore to suppress scandal. Tom meets Sarah at his house after speaking with Lamont, and he tells her that she must keep his and Lamont's meeting a secret.

That night, Tom and Sarah sleep together in the basement of Tom's lodge. When they wake up, the lodge is ablaze, and Tom saves Sarah from the blaze, however he is too late to save Barbara Deane, who burns to death in the inferno. He is committed to the hospital with severe burns. Lamont tells him that Sarah is okay, and that Ralph Redwing and his wife left for Venezuela, as well as that Jerry and Robbie, the arsonists, had stolen a car and crashed it into a ditch before being arrested. Tom is discharged from the hospital but fakes his own death so that he's no longer under the control of Victor, Gloria, and Glen. Lamont tells Tom of a string of murders involving the words BLUE ROSE written near those killed. Attacked were 4 major characters: A prostitute, a gay piano player, a gay doctor, and a butcher. The doctor survived, and Tom is surprised to learn that the doctor is Buzz, Roddy's partner. The man who was investigating these cases killed himself soon after the butcher's death.

In Tom and Lamont's hotel, Tom finds a newspaper detailing his own death. He realizes then that Glen Upshaw is the killer, not Barbara. He killed Jeanine after she threatened to expose his political corruption and the fact that he had made Gloria, his daughter, then a little girl, his sex slave. When Anton was blamed for the crime, Magda, Tom's grandmother, found out what a horrible person Glen was, and in a depressive state, waded into the lake and drowned herself. Tom and Lamont write I KNOW WHAT YOU ARE over and over on pieces of paper, copying Barbara Deane's notes, and mail them to Glen in order to "rattle his cage". Lamont lends Tom "The Divided Man", a novelization of the Blue Rose murders written by Timothy Underhill.

Andrés, Lamont's helper, drives Tom and Lamont to Glen's house and they watch his shocked expression as he opens their letters. They see him argue briefly with Fulton Bishop before they leave. The two learn that Jerry hired his friend, a man named Schilling, to shoot at Tom when he looked out the window. Tom calls Sarah, but he hangs up without saying anything. He then tries to call his mother, but the phone is answered by Dr. Milton, so he hangs up again.

Lamont goes to meet Officer Natchez at a coffeeshop while Tom remains in the hotel room. When he doesn't return, Andrés drives Tom to Lamont's house, where Tom finds a huge mess as well as Lamont's corpse. Tom and Andrés smell cigars at the crime scene, proving that Glen was Lamont's killer. They speak with Natchez, who goes with them to Glen's house. The Kingsleys tell them that Glen departed after taking a call from Deputy Spychalla. It turns out that when Spychalla told Glen that they had caught the men who set Tom's lodge on fire, Glen believed he had nothing to hide from anymore and went to see Carmen Bishop, Fulton's sister, not far from where Nancy Vetiver lives. The three of them (Tom, Natchez, and Andrés) travel to the Third Court in search of Glen, who they discover was a lover of both Barbara Deane and Carmen Bishop to make himself blend in. His relationship with Carmen allowed him to corrupt Fulton and indirectly take control of the police force.

In the Third Court, Natchez provokes Glen by shouting the text from Jeanine's notes. Glen fires at Tom with a pistol but misses. Natchez shoots Glen in the head, killing him as Carmen Bishop watches from the sidelines. Glen's body is taken back to his house. He had placed all filed evidence of his crimes at the house of Jerry Hasek. The three make Glen's death look like a suicide by placing his body in a position with the gun against his temple, where Natchez shot him.

The Redwings travel to Switzerland and Ralph Redwing gives Fulton Bishop (who apparently escaped punishment) a job overseas. Buddy and Sarah are no longer engaged.

The final scene of the book shows Tom and Sarah reuniting at the Mill Walk Zoo, and beginning their relationship together.

== Blue Rose ==
Together with Koko and The Throat, Mystery forms a series of novels often referred to as the "Blue Rose Trilogy". Though the novels feature similar themes and many of the same characters, they do not take place in strict continuity with each other; for instance, the main character of Mystery, Tom Pasmore, goes on to appear in The Throat and two other novels, but a major element of Tom's backstory - a childhood accident that left him hospitalized and incapacitated for several months - is transplanted to the main character of those novels, a writer and Vietnam veteran named Tim Underhill. A similar incident happened to Straub himself as a child.

The title "Blue Rose" refers to the signature of a serial killer who committed a series of murders in Underhill's hometown (the words Blue Rose were written on walls near the bodies of each victim). The murders are only briefly mentioned in Koko and Mystery but become the central focus of The Throat.
