= Full Circle (1977 film) =

1977 Canadian-British horror film

- Theatrical poster
- Directed by: Richard Loncraine
- Written by: Harry Bromley Davenport
- Screenplay by: Dave Humphries
- Based on: Julia by Peter Straub
- Starring: Mia Farrow; Keir Dullea; Tom Conti; Robin Gammell; Jill Bennett; Cathleen Nesbitt
- Cinematography: Peter Hannan
- Edited by: Ron Wisman
- Music by: Colin Towns
- Production companies: Fetter Productions; Canadian Film Development Corporation
- Distributed by: Astral Films (Canada); Cinema International Corporation (United Kingdom)
- Release dates: 11 September 1977 (San Sebastián Film Festival); 4 May 1978 (London); 19 May 1978 (Canada)
- Running time: 98 minutes
- Countries: Canada; United Kingdom
- Language: English
- Budget: CA$1.1 million

Full Circle, released in the United States as The Haunting of Julia, is a 1977 supernatural horror film directed by Richard Loncraine, and starring Mia Farrow and Keir Dullea. Based on the novel Julia by the American writer Peter Straub, it is the first film realisation of one of his books, and follows a woman who, after the death of her daughter, finds herself haunted by the vengeful ghost of a young girl in her new home.

A co-production between Canada and the United Kingdom, the film was shot in London, and first released under the title Full Circle, opening at the San Sebastián International Film Festival in September 1977. It was subsequently released theatrically in the UK and Canada in May 1978, through Cinema International Corporation and Astral Films, respectively. The film went unreleased in the United States until May 1981, when it was given theatrical distribution through Discovery Films under the title The Haunting of Julia.

The film received mixed reviews from critics at the time of its release, with some praising its atmosphere and performances, while others deemed it either predictable or too plodding.

== Plot ==
Julia Lofting, an American housewife living in London, inadvertently kills her daughter, Kate, while performing a botched tracheotomy after Kate begins choking during breakfast. Kate's death traumatises Julia and fractures her already unstable marriage to her husband Magnus. Julia formally separates from Magnus, who opposes her wish to divorce.

Seeking independence, Julia rents a large, fully-furnished house in Holland Park. On the home's second floor, she finds one of the bedrooms filled with a child's possessions. Soon after moving in, Julia experiences a number of strange occurrences in the home, such as odd noises and appliances turning on by themselves. She begins to suspect Magnus is breaking into the house. In the park across the street, Julia sees a young girl that she believes is Kate, but the child disappears. Later, she again sees the girl in the park and finds a mutilated tortoise and knife where she stood.

Magnus's sister, Lily, holds a gathering of friends at Julia's new home. Lily brings with her Mrs Flood, a psychic medium who suggests that they conduct a séance. Julia is hesitant, but agrees to participate. During the séance, Mrs Flood becomes frightened and tells Julia to leave the house immediately. Moments later, one of Lily's friends falls down the stairs before Mrs Flood can explain what she saw. Later, Julia is informed by Mrs Flood that she had a vision of a boy bleeding to death in the park.

The next day, while Julia is out, Magnus breaks into her house. He sees something and follows it to the basement where he falls from the staircase, fatally cutting his throat on a broken mirror. Meanwhile, Julia, curious about the home's prior residents, learns from a neighbour that it once belonged to Heather Rudge, who sold the property after her daughter Olivia died. Upon further investigation, Julia discovers an article about Geoffrey Braden, a young boy who was murdered in the park in the 1940s. Julia visits Geoffrey's mother, Greta, who says a vagrant was executed for the crime but that she believes it was children in the park who murdered her son. Greta claims his murder was a hate crime motivated by the fact that Geoffrey was German. She says she has followed the lives of the children who were in the park with Geoffrey that day, and asks Julia to visit the remaining two, now adults: Captain Paul Winter and David Swift.

First, Julia visits Winter, but when she mentions Geoffrey, he forcefully tells her to leave. She then visits Swift, an alcoholic who explains that Olivia had a sadistic power over him and the other children: He tells Julia that Olivia taught them about sex, and made each of them perform a ritual killing of an animal. Swift recounts Geoffrey's murder, which was orchestrated by Olivia: She forced the other boys to hold him down while she shoved grass and clumps of dirt down his throat and then smothered him with a coat. After he was dead, Olivia used a penknife to castrate him. Shortly after Julia departs Swift's apartment, he slips on a broken bottle in the stairwell and falls to his death. Meanwhile, Julia tells her friend Mark, an antiques dealer, what she has discovered but he does not believe her. That evening, Mark is electrocuted by a lamp falling into his bath.

Julia visits Olivia's mother, Heather, in a psychiatric home. Heather confesses that she strangled Olivia to death after learning of Geoffrey's murder, and insists that Olivia was inherently evil. As Julia leaves she looks over her shoulder at Heather, who glimpses Olivia's eyes and dies of a fright-induced heart attack. Julia returns home, where she witnesses Olivia's apparition, first in the bathroom mirror and then in the living room playing with Kate's beloved cymbal-banging clown toy. Julia takes the toy from Olivia, offers her a hug, and asks her to stay. She proceeds to embrace Olivia, only to have her throat slashed by the sharp edges of the toy. Collapsing onto a lounge chair, Julia bleeds to death.

== Cast ==
- Mia Farrow as Julia Lofting
- Keir Dullea as Magnus Lofting
- Tom Conti as Mark
- Robin Gammell as Mr Swift
- Jill Bennett as Lily
- Cathleen Nesbitt as Mrs Rudge
- Anna Wing as Mrs Flood
- Edward Hardwicke as Captain Paul Winter
- Mary Morris as Greta Braden
- Pauline Jameson as Claudia Branscombe
- Peter Sallis as Jeffrey Branscombe
- Arthur Howard as Mr Piggott
- Damaris Hayman as Miss Pinner
- Susan Porrett as Mrs Ward
- Sophie Ward as Kate Lofting
- Hilda Fenemore as Katherine
- Yvonne Edgell as Mrs Flood's niece
- Nigel Havers as estate agent
- Denis Lill as doctor

== Analysis ==
Film scholar Barbara Creed considers Full Circle an example of numerous supernatural horror films that utilise ghost children as a means of exploring humans' relationships to death, particularly the "dual (earthly/spiritual) nature of the little girl, and her propensity for entering other worlds... [the film] presents a mother-daughter bond as particularly conducive to ghosts and haunting." Writer Kim Newman compares the film to Nicolas Roeg's Don't Look Now (1973) due to its shared themes of the supernatural and the grief of losing a child, which unwittingly leads a mourning parent to their own demise.

== Production ==
=== Development ===
Harry Bromley Davenport wrote the original screen adaptation of American novelist Peter Straub's Julia (1975), titling the screenplay The Link. Dave Humphries retooled Davenport's version, and retitled it When the Wind Blows before director Richard Loncraine chose to retitle the film as Full Circle.

After finding little success convincing British film companies to fully fund the project, producer Peter Fetterman acquired capital from Canada's Astral Media—a radio broadcasting conglomerate—to produce the feature. "I managed to persuade a group of musicians, their management, and accountants to put up 400,000 dollars between them," Fetterman recalled. "So now I had 500,000 from Canada, 400,000 dollars from England and I could raise 10,000 dollars in small units from private investors."

=== Casting ===
Fetterman initially travelled to Los Angeles to cast a "bankable" actress for the lead role of Julia, but this attempt proved unfruitful. After learning that Mia Farrow was performing in stage plays in London at the time, he returned to the United Kingdom and approached her backstage after a performance and asked her to appear in the film. Farrow, who at the time was mainly working in theatre, was reluctant to appear in the film, but ultimately convinced by Fetterman.

=== Filming ===
Filming of Full Circle took place in London over a period of seven weeks between November and December 1976 on a budget of CA$1.1 million. The production was reportedly rushed, as the film had to be finished before the end of the tax year of its Canadian production company. Because of this, the screenplay, location scouting, and casting had to be completed within a three-week period. Actress Mia Farrow shot the film while simultaneously performing in a stage production by the Royal Shakespeare Company of Ivanov.

Director Richard Loncraine stated that the shoot was at times tense, and noted that Farrow, whom he described as "an eccentric" but "well-mannered woman," disappeared for two days after suffering a nervous breakdown, which temporarily halted the production. At the time, Farrow had conflicting feelings about appearing in another horror film after Rosemary's Baby (1968), and had intended to approach the material as though it revolved around a woman's psychological breakdown, rather than an outright supernatural horror narrative.

The film's interior sequences were shot in a home in South Kensington, while the home's exterior was filmed using a different house elsewhere in London.

=== Post-production ===
The original cut of the film as it was shown at the 1977 Marché du Film was approximately six minutes longer than the final theatrical cut, and featured several differing sequences. One of the most notable differences was the fate of Magnus: in the original cut, his character is not killed while breaking into Julia's home, and instead leaves the house angrily before departing to a social club. The film was recut in April 1978 after its screening at the Marché du Film to remediate what the producers felt were pacing issues that made it less "marketable".

== Music ==
Composer Colin Towns's musical score for the film was written and recorded prior to the film being shot, and was composed based upon the screenplay alone. Towns's score received a vinyl LP release through Thorn EMI, and was included as a compact disc on the 2023 limited edition Blu-ray released by Imprint Films.

== Release ==
Full Circle was screened at the Cannes Marché du Film in May 1977 before premiering at the San Sebastián International Film Festival on 11 September 1977 and at the Avoriaz International Fantastic Film Festival in France in 1978. The film opened in London on 4 May 1978 and in Canada on 19 May 1978 through Cinema International Corporation, who also represented several American film studios, such as Metro-Goldwyn-Mayer, Paramount, and Universal Pictures. The film also received theatrical release in Hong Kong in the fall of 1980.

In the United States, the film was released through Discovery Films under the title The Haunting of Julia, opening in Washington, D.C., on 6 February 1981 before premiering in New York City on 29 May 1981. It subsequently opened in San Francisco on 1 July 1981, and later screened in Boston beginning 2 October 1981. In the United States, the film still failed to find an audience. Due to poor storage conditions of the film elements between its initial completion and the U.S. release, the film stock attained a brown hue noticeable on American copies of the film.

=== Home media ===
Media Home Entertainment released the film on VHS in the United States in 1981 under The Haunting of Julia title. It was re-released on VHS in 1988 by Magnum Entertainment.

In January 2023, the Australian label Imprint Films announced they were releasing a limited edition Blu-ray edition of the film, along with its original musical score on CD, on 26 April 2023. The American distributor Scream Factory subsequently announced a 4K UHD Blu-ray edition, which was released in North America on 18 April 2023, while the British Film Institute announced a 4K UHD Blu-ray that was released in the United Kingdom on 24 April 2023. The French distributor Le Chat qui Fume released a 4K UHD Blu-ray edition in July 2023.

== Reception ==
=== Critical response ===
Upon its screening at the Avoriaz Film Festival, the film received "rave reviews" from numerous French film critics and won the Grand Prix prize for best feature. Following its premiere at the San Sebastian Film Festival, The Guardian noted: "Some of the technical work is first-class, as are many of the supporting performances (you'll either like or hate Mia Farrow according to taste). But the film would have been more interesting as a proper study of a woman "under the influence" than it is a slightly more derivative tale of evil working from beyond the grave." Film critic Derek Malcolm, writing after the film's May 1978 release in the United Kingdom, praised Farrow's performance, as well as the film's cinematography and atmosphere, summarising that the film "is well worth seeing, even if it does suffer from those two well-known British cinematic deficiencies—lack of a really clear purpose and the narrative drive to go with it." Tom Milne of The Observer felt the film was predictable, and that director Loncraine's "piling on the emptily brooding stylistics does little to help matters."

Elizabeth Smith of the Montreal Gazette praised Farrow's performance as "harrowing," adding that "the tension is strong throughout, never a let-up or a breather... you'll leave the movie drained of emotion. It's a terrifying film." Variety noted that the film "has a fairly tight script which, in first half at least, builds up scary tensions nicely. There's a performance by Mia Farrow which is somewhat reminiscent of Rosemary's Baby, and enough supernatural trappings to please those who are fascinated by the occult." Ernest Leogrande of the New York Daily News gave the film a one-and-a-half-star rating out of four, writing that it "seems to be structured around the themes of expiation and forgiveness... [but] it's hard to get interested in the fate of the pallid Julia."

Janet Maslin of The New York Times was unimpressed by the film, writing that it "manages to draw on every horror movie cliche imaginable and still make very little sense... As directed by Richard Loncraine, The Haunting of Julia is virtually scareless, and the camera angles provide advance tipoffs to the few frightening episodes that punctuate the dull ones." The Washington Post's Judith Martin gave the film a similarly unfavourable review, writing that the opening scene "has more of the real essence of horror to it than any number of walks down dark passages to the accompaniment of jangly background music. Unfortunately, after this one fresh approach, the film turns to dark, noisy walks," concluding that it "lacks the psychological logic of a good ghost story."

In his book Uneasy Dreams: The Golden Age of British Horror Films, 1956-1976 (2010), Gary A. Smith describes the film as a "dark and depressing "arthouse" horror film." Conversely, Jonathan Rigby, in English Gothic (2000), discusses the various Anglo-Canadian co-productions of the period, saying that "Much the best of these offerings is Richard Loncraine's quietly disturbing Full Circle", noting also that "Loncraine makes the most of memorable cameos from fine character actors", and concluding that "the elegiac atmosphere Loncraine conjures up ... is almost tangible."

=== Accolades ===
Institution	Year	Category	Recipient	Result	Ref.
Avoriaz International Fantastic Film Festival	1978	Grand Prix	Full Circle	Won	
Saturn Awards	1982	Best International Film	Full Circle	Nominated	
Saturn Awards	1982	Best Music	Colin Towns	Nominated	

== Sources ==
- Creed, Barbara (2005). Phallic Panic: Film, Horror and the Primal Uncanny. Melbourne, Victoria, Australia: Melbourne Univ. Publishing. ISBN 978-0-522-85172-4.
- Emmons, Charles F. (1982). Chinese Ghosts and ESP: A Study of Paranormal Beliefs and Experiences. Lanham, Maryland: Scarecrow Press. ISBN 978-0-810-81492-9.
- Loncraine, Richard; Fitzjohn, Simon (2023). The Haunting of Julia (Blu-ray audio commentary). Los Angeles, California: Scream Factory. OCLC 1375755721.
- Meehan, Paul (2019). The Haunted House on Film: An Historical Analysis. Jefferson, North Carolina: McFarland. ISBN 978-1-476-67458-2.
- Newman, Kim (2011). Nightmare Movies: Horror on Screen Since the 1960s (Revised ed.). London, England: Bloomsbury. ISBN 978-1-408-80503-9.
- Smith, Gary A. (2015). Uneasy Dreams: The Golden Age of British Horror Films, 1956-1976. Jefferson, North Carolina: McFarland & Company. ISBN 978-1-476-60530-2.
- Peirse, Alison (21 March 2024). "Screenwriting, poetics, horror: Full Circle: The Haunting of Julia" (PDF). Screen. 65 (1). Oxford University Press: 47–62. doi:10.1093/screen/hjae001. Archived from the original (PDF) on 29 May 2025.
- Rigby, Jonathan (2015). English Gothic: Classic Horror Cinema 1897-2015 (Revised ed.). Cambridge, England: Signum Books. ISBN 978-0-957-64816-6.
