= Ghost Story (Straub novel) =

1979 novel by Peter Straub

- Author: Peter Straub
- Language: English
- Genre: Horror
- Publisher: Coward, McCann and Geoghegan
- Publication date: 1979
- Publication place: United States
- Media type: Print (Hardcover)
- Pages: 483 (first edition hardcover)
- ISBN: 0-698-10959-7

Ghost Story is a horror novel by American writer Peter Straub. It was published on January 1, 1979, by Coward, McCann and Geoghegan. The story involves a writer named Donald "Don" Wanderley who goes to the town of Milburn in upstate New York after the death of his uncle. He discovers that the death may be linked to a group of old men calling themselves the Chowder Society, and the ghost stories told in its inner circle. The novel was a watershed in Straub's career, becoming a national bestseller and cementing his reputation.

Ghost Story was adapted as a 1981 horror film, directed by John Irvin, minus the fifth protagonist, Lewis Benedikt.

== Background ==
Straub recalls that Ghost Story started as a result of reading classic American supernatural fiction, including Stephen King's 1975 novel 'Salem's Lot. He says:

I reread Hawthorne and James, and went out and got all of Lovecraft and a lot of the books by his 'set'—this was because I wanted to find out what my tradition was, since I was by then pretty firmly in the field—I also read Bierce, Wharton's ghost stories, and a lot Europeans... The first thing I thought of was having a bunch of old men tell stories to each other—and then I hoped I could think of some device that would link all the stories. I very much like the idea of stories set down in novels—a lot of my life seems to have been spent listening to older people tell me stories about their families, their youth, and all the rest. And it seemed like a formal challenge.

== Synopsis ==
The novel opens with a man named Donald Wanderley, who is traveling with a young girl whom he has apparently kidnapped. Donald and the girl arrive in Panama City, Florida, at which point the novel jumps back in time to the events of the previous winter.

Living in the small upstate New York town of Milburn (a fictional location which is indicated to be in Broome County east of Binghamton) are four men in their seventies: John Jaffrey, a doctor; Lewis Benedikt, a retired entrepreneur; Sears James, an attorney; and Ricky Hawthorne, an attorney and James' partner. For the past 50 years these men - calling themselves the Chowder Society - have met together on a weekly basis to tell stories.

Their group once had a fifth member, Edward Wanderley. But a year before the current events, Edward died in mysterious circumstances at a party at John Jaffrey's house, held in honor of a visiting actress named Ann-Veronica Moore.

Ever since, the friends have been plagued with horrible nightmares, and have taken to telling each other ghost stories. At one of their meetings, Sears tells a ghost story from his youth. Before deciding to study law, James relates how he once took on a teaching post in a rural community. He developed a fascination with one of his students, a mentally disturbed young boy named Fenny Bate. Fenny and his sister were orphans, ostracized by the community. On making enquiries, James found out that the two children had been sexually abused by their older brother Gregory, although at this point Gregory was dead and the children were living together alone. Sears tells his friends that he saw a threatening young man hanging around the school, and came to believe it to be the spirit of Gregory Bate, returning to claim his siblings. Sears attempted to save Fenny from the clutches of his dead brother, but to no avail. Fenny died, and Sears left the small community when he had finished the school year, having satisfied the terms of his contract.

The next morning after telling his story, Sears and Ricky are called to see one of their clients, a farmer who has found his livestock mutilated in his field. Meanwhile, a beautiful and mysterious young woman named Anna Mostyn has taken up residency at a hotel in the town and takes a job at Sears and Ricky's firm, claiming to be the niece of a former Milburn resident called Eva Galli, a name that stirs discomfort in the four men. Later in the car, Sears reveals to Ricky that the previous night's story was not fiction, but reflects a real experience from his youth. Sears also admits that he is scared, as are all the members of the Chowder Society. They decide to write to Edward's nephew, Donald Wanderley, as Donald has written an occult novel, and they think that his research abilities might be employed on their behalf. Before Donald arrives, however, Jaffrey, who has been behaving increasingly erratically, dies by jumping off a bridge.

Donald arrives just as Jaffrey's funeral is coming to a close. The three remaining members of the Society tell him that they want him to investigate any possible avenues that he might deem appropriate. Several years previously Donald's brother David died under mysterious circumstances, and this led him to write his horror novel. Donald tells them the sequence of true events that led him to write his novel in an effort to understand them. He had landed a teaching position at Berkeley on the strength of his first novel, and began a relationship with a graduate student named Alma Mobley. At first Donald was inseparable from Alma, and there was talk of marriage. But over time he began to feel increasingly troubled by her manner. Alma had a sinister drug-dealing acquaintance named Greg Benton (who was the guardian of a mentally disabled younger brother), mentioned being friends with members of a cult linked with the Manson Family, and claimed to be in regular contact with the spirit of her dead lover, Tasker Martin. Donald found himself finding excuses to avoid Alma; his work suffered; and one day Alma simply vanished. Upon investigating he discovered that a great many things that Alma had told him about her past were fabrications; for example, she had claimed to be the daughter of a wealthy New Orleans artist named Robert Mobley, but upon researching Robert Mobley, Donald found he had two sons, but no daughter. A few months later his brother David called him and told him that he and Alma were engaged and that he wanted things to be right between Donald and his new fiancée. Donald tried to warn David about Alma, but to no avail, and soon afterwards David was dead.

Not long after Donald tells his story, Lewis Benedikt is murdered in nearby woods, and Sears and Ricky decide that it is time to tell Donald the most terrible story that the Chowder Society knows – this, too, is a true tale. Fifty years previously a young woman named Eva Galli had moved to the town. She was in her early twenties and all five of the young men fell head over heels for her, although it was a purely platonic love. One night in 1929—not long after Black Tuesday—Eva came to see them, but she was not acting like herself. She made aggressive sexual advances and belittled them. There was a struggle, and Eva fell and hit her head. Believing her to be dead, they conspired to hide the body by putting it in a car and driving it into a deep pond. But at the last moment Eva's body disappeared from the inside of the car, and they saw a lynx looking at them from the other bank.

Donald has already encountered Anna Mostyn, the young woman claiming to be the niece of Eva Galli, and has found himself strongly reminded of Alma. He begins his research and concludes that what they are dealing with is a manitou, or some other kind of shape-shifting creature. He believes that Eva Galli, Alma Mobley, Anna Mostyn and also Ann-Veronica Moore, the mysterious young actress who was the guest of honor at the party at which his uncle died, are all the same creature, out for revenge on the Chowder Society for what they did to her as Eva Galli. Sears also recognizes Greg Benton and his disabled brother from Donald's description as Gregory Bate and his brother Fenny, from his strange experience during his time as a teacher. The men conclude that Greg and Fenny must belong to the same supernatural species as Eva. Donald finds some of his uncle's tape recordings and listens to parts not even his uncle had heard yet, where Eva speaks directly to him and the surviving Chowder Society, saying she belongs to an ancient race of beings and that she herself is old enough to remember the first humans in the country.

Donald, Ricky, and Sears are joined in their struggle by Peter Barnes, a young man whose mother was killed by Fenny and Gregory, who revealed to him they were previously normal human beings who have been granted new life and powers. Gregory tells them that a woman named Florence de Peyser (whom Alma had previously told Donald was her aunt) helped resurrect them after their mortal deaths, and that Eva is also subservient to the de Peyser woman. Sears is ambushed and killed in his car, and the survivors now realize that the reanimated Gregory and Fenny are helping Eva in her endeavors. Gregory and Fenny attack Peter, Donald, and Ricky in a movie theater, but they are both killed in the ensuing struggle, leaving Donald to realize that though they have otherworldly powers, the creatures are not truly immortal. The survivors track Eva down and defeat her, but she escapes in a new shape.

Exhausted, Ricky leaves Milburn for an extended vacation with his wife, and Peter prepares for college. Donald keeps watch to see what form Eva will next appear in. Deducing that she will likely take on the form of a child, Donald watches the children in a local park, and upon encountering a mysterious girl called Angie who is shunned by the other children, becomes convinced she is Eva's newest incarnation. He invites Angie to come with him, and the narrative returns to the point at which it began, with Donald in the motel room in Panama City with Angie.

While in Florida, Eva emerges from the form of the little girl and attempts to twist Donald's mind. He is able to resist, and kills her after she tries to take the form of a wasp to escape. Donald then prepares to go to San Francisco to hunt down Florence de Peyser.

== Reception ==
The novel received mixed reviews, with The New York Times commenting negatively on its length and complexity, whilst acknowledging the power of the "eerie set-pieces". Reactor praised its "sense of... implacable evil"; Benjamin Percy said: "Peter Straub is a modern-day Henry James, but with sharper teeth and a long black tongue. He writes literary horror, in which the sentences are elegantly crafted, the characters wholly believable and the circumstances menacing." Stephen King praised the novel, calling it "the best of the supernatural novels to be published in the wake of the three books that kicked off a new horror 'wave' in the seventies." Kirkus reviews was less fulsome, describing it as: "an overlong, lukewarm chiller with some superb moments."

== Adaptation ==
The novel was adapted in 1981 into a film directed by John Irvin and starring Fred Astaire, Melvyn Douglas, Douglas Fairbanks Jr., John Houseman, Craig Wasson, and Alice Krige. The film adaptation, though hotly anticipated, received a less than positive reception from critics after its release. The New York Times called it "humdrum", Variety criticized the slow pace and predictability of the film, and Time Out called it: a "disastrous distillation of Peter Straub's overrated but at least tolerably coherent novel."

== Relation to other Straub works ==
Ricky Hawthorne is mentioned in the author's 1983 novel Floating Dragon, in which it is stated that he is the uncle of a victim in the latter book. The town of Milburn briefly appears in Koko, published in 1988.

== Cultural impact ==
The novel is cited as part of the inspiration for the 2005 video game F.E.A.R. First Encounter Assault Recon. In particular, Alma Wade, a character in the game, was named after Alma Mobley.
