= Peter Straub =

American novelist and poet (1943–2022)

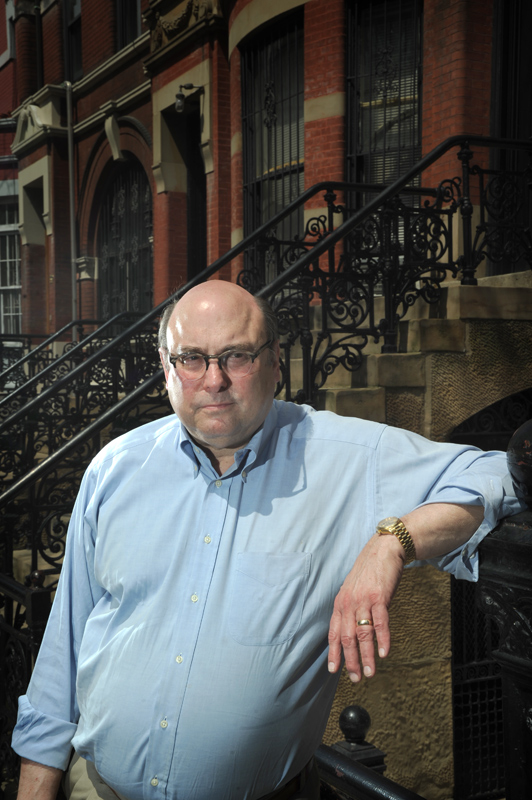
- Straub in 2009
- Born: Peter Francis Straub; March 2, 1943; Milwaukee, Wisconsin, U.S.
- Died: September 4, 2022 (aged 79); New York City, New York, U.S.
- Education: University of Wisconsin–Madison (BA); Columbia University (MA)
- Occupations: Novelist, poet
- Spouse: Susan Bitker Straub (m. 1966)
- Children: Benjamin Straub, Emma Straub
- Writing career
- Genre: Horror
- Notable works: Ghost Story (1979), The Talisman (1984), Koko (1988)
- Notable awards: World Fantasy Award—Life Achievement, Bram Stoker Award, World Fantasy Award, and International Horror Guild Award
- Website: www.peterstraub.net

Peter Francis Straub (/straʊb/; March 2, 1943 – September 4, 2022) was an American novelist and poet. He had success with several horror and supernatural fiction novels, among them Julia (1975), Ghost Story (1979) and The Talisman (1984), the last co-written with Stephen King. He explored the mystery genre with the Blue Rose trilogy, consisting of Koko (1988), Mystery (1990), and The Throat (1993). He fused the supernatural with crime fiction in Lost Boy, Lost Girl (2003) and the related In the Night Room (2004). For the Library of America, he edited the volume H. P. Lovecraft: Tales and the anthology American Fantastic Tales. Straub received such literary honors as the Bram Stoker Award, World Fantasy Award, and International Horror Guild Award.

According to his New York Times obituary, Straub "brought a poet's sensibility to stories about ghosts, demons and other things that go bump in the night."

== Early life and education ==
Straub was born in Milwaukee, Wisconsin, the son of Gordon Anthony Straub and Elvena (Nilsestuen) Straub. At the age of seven, Straub was struck by a car, sustaining serious injuries. He was hospitalized for several months and used a wheelchair until he had re-learned how to walk. Straub has said that the accident made him prematurely aware of his own mortality.

Straub read voraciously from an early age, although his father hoped that he would grow up to be a professional athlete and his mother wanted him to be a Lutheran minister. He attended Milwaukee Country Day School on a scholarship, and, during his time there, began writing. In high school, he "discovered Thomas Wolfe and Jack Kerouac, patron saints of wounded and self-conscious adolescence and also, blessedly, jazz music, which spoke in utterance of beyond any constraint: passion and liberation in the form of speech on the far side of the verbal border."

Straub attended the University of Wisconsin–Madison, where he discovered "the various joys of Henry James, William Carlos Williams, and the Texas blues-rocker Steve Miller, a great & joyous character who lived across the street." He earned an honors BA in English in 1965 and an MA at Columbia University a year later. He briefly taught English at Milwaukee Country Day, where he "enjoyed a minor but temporary success as Mr. Chips-cum-jalapenos, largely due to the absolute freedom given him by the administration and his affection for his students, who faithfully followed him as he struck matches and led them into caves named Lawrence, Forster, Brontë, Thackeray, etc., etc. On his off-hours, he fell in love with poetry, especially John Ashbery’s poetry, and wrote imitations of same. Three years later, fearing to turn into a spiritless & chalk-stained drudge, he went to Dublin, Ireland, to work on a Ph.D., secretly (a secret even to him) to start writing seriously."

== Career ==
After mixed success with two attempts at literary mainstream novels in the mid-1970s (Marriages and Under Venus), Straub dabbled in the supernatural for the first time with Julia (1975). He recalls that "The reason I chose to write scary books was because, at the time, there were three horror novels that had been enormously successful: The Exorcist, Rosemary's Baby and The Other. But there were only three of them, so it looked to me as though there was plenty of room for newcomers. And if I wrote in the horror genre, I knew I could do anything. I could experiment." He followed Julia with If You Could See Me Now (1977), and came to widespread public attention with his fifth novel, Ghost Story (1979), which was a critical success and was later loosely adapted into a 1981 film starring Fred Astaire. In 1980, he published the fantasy Shadowland. After returning to America, he wrote Floating Dragon, which won the August Derleth Award. He said "I knew that this book would be an at least temporary farewell to the supernatural material that had been my daily fare." He coauthored the horror-fantasy The Talisman (1984) with his longtime friend Stephen King.

After a fallow period, Straub re-emerged in 1988 with Koko, a non-supernatural (though horrific) novel about the Vietnam war. Koko was followed by Mystery (1990) and The Throat (1993). The three novels comprise the "Blue Rose Trilogy", which extended Straub's experiments with metafiction and unreliable narrators.

In 1990, Straub published Houses Without Doors, a collection of short fiction including the shorter version of the novella Mrs. God. In 1996, he published the mainstream thriller The Hellfire Club. In 1999, Straub published Mr. X, a novel with a doppelgänger theme. The novel pays homage to H. P. Lovecraft, as the eponymous character writes in a similar style. In 2001, Straub and King rejoined forces for Black House, the sequel to The Talisman which tied that book in with King's The Dark Tower series. Lost Boy, Lost Girl was published in 2003; a year later, the related In the Night Room was released. Both won the Bram Stoker Award.

In 2005, Straub edited the Library of America volume H. P. Lovecraft: Tales. In 2009, Straub edited the Library of America anthology American Fantastic Tales.

Straub published several books of poetry. My Life in Pictures appeared in 1971 as part of a series of six poetry pamphlets Straub published with his friend Thomas Tessier under the Seafront Press imprint while living in Dublin. In 1972, the more substantial chapbook Ishmael was published by Turret Books in London. Straub's third book of poetry, Open Air, appeared later that same year from Irish University Press. The collection Leeson Park and Belsize Square: Poems 1970 – 1975 was published by Underwood-Miller in October 1983. It reprinted much of Ishmael along with previously uncollected poems, but none of the poems from Open Air. He also sat on the contributing editorial board of the literary journal Conjunctions, and he guest-edited Conjunctions #39, an issue on New Wave Fabulism.

In 2007, Straub's personal papers were acquired by the Fales Library at New York University.

Straub's final novel, A Dark Matter, was released in February 2010.

In 2013, Straub appeared on the Code Street podcast with fantasist John Crowley.

In 2016, co-author Stephen King said that he and Straub had plans to write a third Talisman book in the future. King says that the collaboration for the series was "natural," and that the two were excited to work together. In a 2021 appearance on the Dead Headspace podcast, Straub said that due to his health, it was unlikely that he would co-write a third Talisman with King.

In 2024, Penguin Random House launched the republication of many of Straub's novels with new cover art and blurbs.

== Reception and influence ==
A critical essay on Straub's horror work can be found in S. T. Joshi's book The Modern Weird Tale (2001). At the Foot of the Story Tree by Bill Sheehan discusses Straub's work before 2000. John C. Tibbetts wrote a book-length study, The Gothic Worlds of Peter Straub.

In Andrew Shaffer's Secret Santa, a character refers to Stephen King, Anne Rice and Straub as "the unholy trinity" of horror.

Of Straub's contribution to horror King says, "he brought a poet's sensibility to the field, creating a synthesis of horror and beauty" and "he writes a beautiful prose line that features narrative clarity, sterling characterization, and surprising bursts of humor." King told The New York Times that "He was not only a literary writer with a poetic sensibility, but he was readable. And that was a fantastic thing. He was a modern writer who was the equal of, say, Philip Roth, though he wrote about fantastic things." King added that "he was a better and more literary author than I was."

Neil Gaiman paid homage to Straub, writing “One of the best writers I’ve read, one of the best friends I’ve known. Always kind, funny, irascible, brilliant."

Songwriter Nick Cave alludes to Straub's work in songs on two different albums: "The Curse of Millhaven" (from Murder Ballads in 1996) and "Do You Love Me (Part 2)" (from Let Love In in 1993). Straub said "Naturally, this pleased me enormously. It is a great honor to have your work alluded to in that way by another artist. I love the whole idea. Nick Cave is a talented, compelling performer and I could see that some of my work would fall very neatly within the territory that interests him. Eventually we wound up e-mailing each other, and he sent me a very nicely signed copy of one of his CDs. It would be nice to meet him one day."

Paul Tremblay dedicated his 2024 novel Horror Movie to Straub's memory.

== Personal life and death ==
In 1966, Straub married Susan Bitker. They had two children, Benjamin and novelist Emma Straub. The family lived in Dublin from 1969 to 1972, in London from 1972 to 1979, and in the New York City area from 1979 onwards.

When asked who his favorite writer was, Straub replied "I guess I have to say Henry James. At least that’s what I’d say today. On other days, I might choose Raymond Chandler, or Charles Dickens, or Wilkie Collins, or on other, other days, a real long shot, like Donald Harington. In some ways, John Ashbery will always be my favorite writer."

Straub was a jazz aficionado, and saxophonist Lester Young features in his novella Pork Pie Hat. Per WBGO, "He discovered jazz as a boy growing up in Milwaukee in the late 1950s. He gravitated toward Dave Brubeck & Paul Desmond, Clifford Brown, Bill Evans and Miles Davis." In addition to jazz, he was "intensely interested in opera and other forms of classical music."

Straub died on September 4, 2022, aged 79, from complications of a broken hip. At the time of his death, he and his wife lived in Brooklyn.

== Bibliography ==
=== Novels ===
- 1973: Marriages
- 1974: Under Venus
- 1975: Julia
- 1977: If You Could See Me Now
- 1979: Ghost Story
- 1980: Shadowland
- 1983: Floating Dragon
- 1984: The Talisman (with Stephen King)
- 1988: Koko
- 1990: Mystery
- 1993: The Throat
- 1995: The Hellfire Club
- 1999: Mr. X
- 2001: Black House (with Stephen King)
- 2003: Lost Boy, Lost Girl
- 2004: In the Night Room
- 2010: A Dark Matter
- 2025: Wreckage (unfinished)
- 2026: Other Worlds Than These (with Stephen King)

=== Short story collections ===
- 1990: Houses Without Doors (includes "A Short Guide to the City" and a shorter version of Mrs. God)
- 2000: Magic Terror
- 2007: 5 Stories
- 2010: The Juniper Tree and Other Blue Rose Stories
- 2016: Interior Darkness

=== Novellas ===
- 1982: The General's Wife
- 1990: Mrs. God (collected in "Houses Without Doors")
- 1993: The Ghost Village (collected in Magic Terror)
- 1993 Bunny is Good Bread (collected in "Magic Terror")
- 1997 Mr. Clubb and Mr. Cuff (collected in "Magic Terror")
- 1999 Pork Pie Hat (collected in "Magic Terror")
- 2010: A Special Place – The Heart of a Dark Matter (outtake from "A Dark Matter")
- 2011: The Ballad of Ballard and Sandrine
- 1990/2012: The Buffalo Hunter: A Novella (originally collected in "Houses Without Doors" in 1990)
- 2015: Perdido
- 2017: The Process (is a Process All its Own)

=== Poems ===
- 1971: My Life in Pictures
- 1972: Ishmael
- 1972: Open Air
- 1983: Leeson Park and Belsize Square: Poems 1970 – 1975 (Collection)

=== Non-Fiction ===
- 2006: Sides (collection of non-fiction essays)

=== Anthologies ===
- 2005: Peter Straub's Ghosts
- 2008: Poe's Children (2008)
- 2009: American Fantastic Tales (Two Volumes) for the Library of America

=== Omnibus editions ===
- 1984: Wild Animals (collects the novels Julia, If You Could See Me Now, and Under Venus)

=== Limited editions ===
- 2010: The Skylark (an earlier, longer draft of A Dark Matter)

=== Further reading ===
- Hauntings: The Official Peter Straub Bibliography, Michael R. Collings
- Tibbetts, John C. The Gothic Worlds of Peter Straub. Jefferson: McFarland Publishers, 2016

== Awards ==
Work	Year & Award	Category	Result	Ref.
	1997 World Horror Convention Grand Master Award		Won	
	2005 Bram Stoker Award	Lifetime Achievement	Won	
	2010 World Fantasy Award	Lifetime Achievement	Won	
Shadowland	1981 Balrog Awards	Novel	Nominated	
Shadowland	1981 Locus Award	Fantasy Novel	Nominated	
Shadowland	1981 World Fantasy Award	Novel	Nominated	
Shadowland	1984 Kurd Laßwitz Award	Foreign Work	Nominated	
The General's Wife	1982 Balrog Awards	Short Fiction	Nominated	
Floating Dragon	1983 British Fantasy Award	Novel	Won	
Floating Dragon	1984 Locus Award	Fantasy Novel	Nominated	
The Talisman (with Stephen King)	1985 World Fantasy Award	Novel	Nominated	
The Talisman (with Stephen King)	1985 Locus Award	Fantasy Novel	Nominated	
The Talisman (with Stephen King)	2002 Audie Awards	Fiction	Won	
The Juniper Tree	1988 Bram Stoker Award	Long Fiction	Nominated	
Koko	1989 World Fantasy Award	Novel	Won	
Koko	1989 Locus Award	Horror Novel	Nominated	
Mystery	1990 Locus Award	Horror Novel	Nominated	
Houses Without Doors	1990 Bram Stoker Award	Fiction Collection	Nominated	
Houses Without Doors	1991 World Fantasy Award	Collection	Nominated	
Houses Without Doors	1991 Locus Award	Collection	Nominated	
Mrs. God	1992 Locus Award	Horror/Dark Fantasy Novel	Nominated	
The Ghost Village	1993 World Fantasy Award	Novella	Won	
The Throat	1993 Bram Stoker Award	Novel	Won	
The Throat	1994 World Fantasy Award	Novel	Nominated	
Fee	1995 World Fantasy Award	Novella	Nominated	
Peter Straub's Ghosts	1996 Locus Award	Anthology	Nominated	
The Hellfire Club	1996 Bram Stoker Award	Novel	Nominated	
The Hellfire Club	1997 British Fantasy Award	Novel	Nominated	
Mr. Clubb and Mr. Cuff	1998 International Horror Guild Award	Long Fiction	Won	
Mr. Clubb and Mr. Cuff	1998 Bram Stoker Award	Long Fiction	Won	
Mr. Clubb and Mr. Cuff	1999 World Fantasy Award	Novella	Nominated	
Mr. X	1999 International Horror Guild Award	Novel	Nominated	
Mr. X	1999 Bram Stoker Award	Novel	Won	
Mr. X	2000 Locus Award	Fantasy Novel	Nominated	
Mr. X	2001 British Fantasy Award	Novel	Nominated	
Mr. X	2001 Grand Prix de l'Imaginaire	Foreign Novel	Nominated	
Magic Terror: Seven Tales	2000 International Horror Guild Award	Collection	Nominated	
Magic Terror: Seven Tales	2000 Bram Stoker Award	Fiction Collection	Won	
Magic Terror: Seven Tales	2001 Locus Award	Collection	Nominated	
Magic Terror: Seven Tales	2001 World Fantasy Award	Collection	Nominated	
Magic Terror: Seven Tales	2002 British Fantasy Award	Collection	Nominated	
Black House (with Stephen King)	2001 International Horror Guild Award	Novel	Nominated	
Black House (with Stephen King)	2001 Bram Stoker Award	Novel	Nominated	
Black House (with Stephen King)	2002 Locus Award	Novel	Nominated	
The New Wave Fabulists	2002 Otherwise Award		Honor	
The New Wave Fabulists	2003 World Fantasy Award	Anthology	Nominated	
The New Wave Fabulists	2003 Locus Award	Anthology	Nominated	
lost boy, lost girl	2003 Bram Stoker Award	Novel	Won	
lost boy, lost girl	2003 International Horror Guild Award	Novel	Won	
lost boy, lost girl	2004 Locus Award	Fantasy Novel	Nominated	
lost boy, lost girl	2004 British Fantasy Award	Novel	Nominated	
Little Red's Tango	2003 Locus Award	Novelette	Nominated	
In the Night Room	2004 International Horror Guild Award	Novel	Nominated	
In the Night Room	2004 Bram Stoker Award	Novel	Won	
In the Night Room	2005 Locus Award	Fantasy Novel	Nominated	
Mr. Aickman's Air Rifle	2005 Locus Award	Novelette	Nominated	
5 Stories	2007 Bram Stoker Award	Fiction Collection	Nominated	
Sides	2007 International Horror Guild Award	Non-Fiction	Nominated	
Sides	2008 Locus Award	Non-Fiction	Nominated	
Poe's Children: The New Horror	2008 Black Quill Award	Dark Genre Fiction Collection	Nominated	
Poe's Children: The New Horror	2009 Locus Award	Anthology	Nominated	
American Fantastic Tales: Terror and the Uncanny from Poe to the Pulps/from the 1940s to Now	2009 Foreword INDIES Awards	Anthologies	Bronze	
American Fantastic Tales: Terror and the Uncanny from Poe to the Pulps/from the 1940s to Now	2010 Locus Award	Anthology	Nominated	
American Fantastic Tales: Terror and the Uncanny from Poe to the Pulps/from the 1940s to Now	2010 World Fantasy Award	Anthology	Won	
A Dark Matter	2010 Bram Stoker Award	Novel	Won	
A Dark Matter	2010 Black Quill Award	Dark Genre Novel of the Year (Editor's Choice)	Won	
A Dark Matter	2011 Shirley Jackson Award	Novel	Nominated	
A Dark Matter	2011 Locus Award	Fantasy Novel	Nominated	
A Special Place	2010 Locus Award	Novella	Nominated	
The Juniper Tree and Other Blue Rose Stories	2011 Locus Award	Collection	Nominated	
The Ballad of Ballard and Sandrine	2011 Bram Stoker Award	Long Fiction	Won	
The Ballad of Ballard and Sandrine	2012 Shirley Jackson Award	Novelette	Nominated	
The Ballad of Ballard and Sandrine	2012 Locus Award	Novella	Nominated	
Interior Darkness	2017 Locus Award	Collection	Nominated	
The Process Is a Process All Its Own	2018 Locus Award	Novella	Nominated	

== Adaptations ==
- Full Circle (1977), based on Julia (1975)
- Ghost Story (1981), based on Ghost Story (1979)
- The Talisman (2008 short), based on The Talisman
- The Talisman (TBA), an upcoming miniseries based on The Talisman
