= Burt Weissbourd =

Burt Weissbourd is a novelist, screenwriter and producer of feature films. He was born in 1949 and graduated cum laude from Yale University, with honors in psychology. During his student years, he volunteered at the Musée d'Art Moderne de la Ville de Paris and taught English to college students in Thailand. After he graduated, he wrote, directed, and produced educational films for Gilbert Altschul Productions. He began a finance program at the Northwestern University Graduate School of Business, but left to start his own film production company in Los Angeles. He managed that company from 1977 until 1986, producing films including Ghost Story starring Fred Astaire, Melvyn Douglas, John Houseman, Douglas Fairbanks Jr., and Patricia Neal, and Raggedy Man starring Sissy Spacek and Sam Shepard, which The New York Times called "a movie of sweet, low-keyed charm."
