= The Talisman (King and Straub novel) =

1984 novel by Stephen King and Peter Straub

- First edition cover
- Authors: Stephen King; Peter Straub
- Audio read by: Frank Muller
- Language: English
- Series: Jack Sawyer Trilogy
- Genre: Dark fantasy
- Publisher: Viking
- Publication date: November 7, 1984
- Publication place: United States
- Media type: Print (Hardcover)
- Pages: 646
- ISBN: 978-0-670-69199-9
- Followed by: Black House

The Talisman is a 1984 fantasy novel by American writers Stephen King and Peter Straub. The novel sees Jack Sawyer, the twelve-year-old son of a terminally ill actress, make an epic journey across the United States (and across "the Territories", a fantastical parallel version of Earth) to retrieve "the Talisman", a magical artefact with the power to heal his mother. The Talisman was nominated for the Locus and World Fantasy Awards in 1985.

King and Straub followed up with a sequel, Black House (2001), that picks up with a now-adult Jack as a retired Los Angeles homicide detective trying to solve a series of murders in the small town of French Landing, Wisconsin. A third and final novel, Other Worlds Than These, was published in October 2026.

== Plot ==
Jack Sawyer, twelve years old, and his actress mother Lily Cavanaugh have moved from California to the Alhambra Hotel in Arcadia Beach, New Hampshire, to escape the machinations of his dead father's old business partner, Morgan Sloat. Lily is dying of lung cancer, but refuses to accept treatment, or to communicate with Morgan, whom she has never trusted, and suspects of causing the death of Jack's father.

Left to his own devices, Jack meets a mysterious maintenance man named Speedy Parker, who tells him about a place called "the Territories", and a magical item called "the Talisman" that can save his mother. This item is hidden in a counterpart of the Alhambra Hotel called the Agincourt, situated in a remote part of the Territories. We learn that the world Speedy calls the Territories exists in parallel to our own. Some individuals in the Territories have "twinners", or counterparts, in our world. Twinners' births, deaths, and other major life events usually also exist in parallel. Twinners can "flip" or migrate to the other world, but do so by occupying the body of their counterpart. In rare instances (such as Jack's), a person may die in one world but not the other. When this happens, the survivor becomes "single-natured", with the ability to switch back and forth freely between the two worlds. Jack is taught how to flip by Parker, who he learns is the twinner of a lawmaker named Parkus in the Territories. (Note: Retroactively identified in Black House as a gunslinger.) The beloved Queen Laura of the Territories is the twinner of Jack's mother (who is known as the "Queen of the B Movies"), and, like Jack's mother, Queen Laura is dying. Speedy tells Jack that the Talisman is capable of healing both Lily and her Twinner.

Jack sets off to seek the mystical Talisman in the parallel world, with help and encouragement from Parker. Arriving in the Territories and helped by Captain of the Guard, Captain Farren, he encounters the sadistic whip-wielding Osmond, a henchman of Morgan of Orris, who is an enemy of Queen Laura. Morgan of Orris is the Territories counterpart of Morgan Sloat; both versions of Morgan are hunting for Jack, and are aware of his nature, as well as their own. Jack narrowly escapes being caught by Morgan of Orris and takes refuge in woods by the side of the road. But the forest is dangerous: sentient trees attack Jack, forcing him to flip back into this world.

Hoping travel will be safer in his world, Jack continues his journey across the United States and gets a job working as a barback in Oatley, New York. The owner, Smokey Updike, is ruthless and abusive towards Jack and keeps him a virtual prisoner. Jack eventually escapes Oatley, but is chased by an anthropomorphic goat-like creature named Elroy that has been stalking him throughout his stay masquerading as a bar patron. He evades Elroy long enough to return to the Territories, where Jack remembers a conversation between his father and Morgan about how events echo across worlds (mainly how a political assassination in the Territories corresponded to the German invasion of Poland), and the story of another associate of his father named Jerry Bledsoe, who died in a freak explosion. Jack understands that flipping between the two worlds may have serious, even fatal consequences. When Jack returns to his world after running into Elroy and Morgan again, he becomes convinced that he has inadvertently caused a similar incident where an earthquake killed several construction workers in Angola, New York, and loses courage.

In Ohio, after calling his mother at a mall payphone to check on her, Jack meets a blind singer named Snowball (who may or may not be Speedy in disguise), who motivates Jack to continue his journey, before being promptly arrested. Once back on the road, Jack runs into Morgan at a rest stop, flips into the Territories, and meets a werewolf creature, named Wolf. Wolf is a friendly young male, whose family are the dedicated herders and guardians of the Queen's livestock, animals which resemble cow/sheep hybrids. Wolf was acquainted with Jack's father and Morgan/Orris, was aware of their good and evil natures, and identifies Jack because his scent is like his father's. The two become friends, but Morgan arrives through a portal and attacks them with a device that emits lightning bolts. The cattle panic and Wolf nearly drowns while trying to get them out of the river. Jack saves him and escapes by flipping back into his world, taking Wolf with him. The two travel towards Indiana, though Wolf struggles to adjust to Jack's world, particularly to the smell due to his strong sense of smell, resulting in an outburst at a movie theatre. One night, when Wolf transforms under the full moon, Jack is forced to barricade himself in a shack for three days, before their journey can continue.

Jack and Wolf are eventually arrested for vagrancy by a police officer, tried before a magistrate, and are taken to the Sunlight Home, a school for delinquent boys. The school's owner, televangelist Robert "Sunlight" Gardner, is the twinner of Morgan's henchman Osmond, who is on the hunt for Jack. The boys (the majority of students are sociopaths devoted to Gardner) are bullied by the school main prefects, Sonny Singer and Heck Bast, alongside Andy Warwick and Casey, two other prefects. The Sunlight Home has a brutal regime, kept hidden from the outside world: inmates are often subjected to brutal punishments. Jack becomes friends with a boy named Ferd Janklow, who attempts to escape. After a number of incidents involving the prefects bullying him and Gardner trying to extract information from him through torture, Jack and Wolf are able to escape into the Territories. They learn that the Territories counterpart of the school is itself a prison camp, worse even than the Sunlight Home; the duo flip back almost immediately when they see Bast's gargoyle twinner whipping Ferd's twinner to death. The prefects instantly fight Jack and Wolf in the bathroom immediately after they return, and Gardner, who is suspicious of Jack's identity, drugs them both, throws Wolf in a solitary confinement box, and gets the prefects to torture Jack in an attempt to make him reveal himself and what he knows. Wolf, due to stress, transforms into a werewolf again, and wreaks havoc on the school, brutally massacring numerous students, including Bast, and breaking into Gardner's office. Wolf kills the prefects in Gardner's office - Sonny and Casey - but is shot by Sonny before killing him. Jack urges Andy to flee and comforts Wolf as he dies.

A dispirited Jack moves on to Illinois, where he enlists the help of his best friend and Morgan Sloat's son, Richard, who is at a posh boarding school in Illinois. Jack attempts to tell Richard about his adventures and Morgan's plan, but Richard, a devout skeptic, refuses to believe him. Jack's presence unleashes a series of uncanny events: the school transforms into a grotesque Territories version of itself, while the students are replaced with their mutant twinners and attempt to goad Richard into giving up Jack, alongside throwing lethal projectiles (such as rocks) at them. Finally, after around a week, the two boys escape and flip into the Territories.

In the Territories, the duo meet a kind liveryman named Anders, who is reluctantly sending a shipment of weapons - Uzis and Mk 2 grenades - to Morgan's soldiers for a final stand against Jack. Richard, still refusing to accept Jack's tale or the reality of his surroundings, is convinced that he is hallucinating. Jack decides to take the shipment himself a day before delivery and plan an ambush. The boys travel via a battery-operated train (which was installed by Morgan and a legion of slaves) through the "Blasted Lands", a hellish landscape full of fireballs, mutated creatures, and smugglers, two of which Jack fights and kills with the Uzis. Richard finally admits to the Territories' existence due to an overly simplistic clock he saw earlier at Anders depot. Jack and Richard – who is becoming increasingly ill from the radiation – arrive after a few days and bombard the army base after leaving the Blasted Lands, destroying most of Morgan's army (mainly werewolves) and killing both Elroy and Osmond's son Reuel, whose twinner goes to Richard's school. As Morgan arrives, Jack and Richard flip into California.

After hiking a while along the tracks of the train in California and later the highway – during conversation with Richard, Jack realises Sunlight Gardner was the man who murdered his father on Morgan's orders – Jack and Richard arrive at the abandoned seaside town of Point Venuti, California, their final destination, and sneak toward the Agincourt Hotel undetected by the remaining monsters working for Morgan and Gardner, who are patrolling the hotel with Gardner. They meet Speedy Parker, who is weak and dying. Gardner tries to shoot Jack and Richard with a hunting rifle, but fails, and reports back to Morgan at a nearby motel. It is fully revealed here that Morgan plans to destroy the Talisman and become a god.

With the help of a magic water raft Speedy gave them, Jack and Richard enter the Agincourt. Inside the hotel, Jack battles suits of armor defending the Talisman and takes it, causing a wave of mass rewards and punishments to everyone who had been good and bad to Jack respectively (among the events; burning down the Sunlight Home and killing Smokey by exploding his bar), before triggering an earthquake and disbanding the rest of the mutants (mainly werewolves) who allied with Morgan, killing a vast majority. Jack realizes there are multiple worlds beside the two he is familiar with, and the Talisman is the embodiment of the axis of all of them. The Talisman offers Jack godhood; horrified, he turns it down.

As Jack and Richard flee the Agincourt, Gardner and Morgan try to shoot them with Gardner's rifle; however, the sunlight coming off the scope reflects off the Talisman and back into the rifle, blowing it to pieces and brutally injuring Gardner. Jack uses the Talisman to heal Richard and to kill Gardner by melting him after a fight on the castle steps, avenging his father, and faces off with Morgan on the beach. Eventually, after a long battle, he manages to kill Morgan by deflecting a lightning bolt from his device back into him with the Talisman. Jack heals Speedy and Richard, and, after a night in the Territories, returns to New Hampshire with Richard in a Cadillac Eldorado driven by a brother of Wolf. Jack reunites with Lily and uses the Talisman a final time to save both his mother and the Queen, at which point its physical form vanishes. The novel ends with the two embracing in the hotel room.

== Publication history ==
The idea of writing The Talisman first took form when Stephen King moved with his family to London in early 1977. It was there he met Peter and Susan Straub, and their children. The two writers became friends, both being fans of each other's work. King and his family left London three months later to return to the United States. Straub and King had talked multiple times before about collaborating to write a book, but nothing ever surfaced until years after King returned stateside, when the Straubs also moved to the United States. According to King, they began collaborating. Their literary friendship continued after The Talisman was published; in 1999 they began working on the sequel, Black House (2001), which deals with Sawyer as an adult. That book presents a retcon that the Territories are a parallel to All-World. This is made most clear by King's introduction to The Little Sisters of Eluria where he states the pavilion where Jack Sawyer meets Sophie is the same one in The Little Sisters.

== Locations ==
=== The Territories ===
When Jack "flips," he finds himself in a parallel world, which is physically smaller than the world from which he comes. Throughout the course of the novel, Jack uses the size differential as a method to travel quickly across the country. The eastern region, corresponding to the Eastern Seaboard, is the most densely populated and is governed under a feudal system headed by the Queen. The central regions, roughly corresponding to the American plains, are a grain growing area known as "the Outposts." Beyond them, the western region of the Territories is a destroyed area known as "the Blasted Lands" (analogous to the American Southwest – primarily New Mexico, where the atomic bomb was tested). It apparently was wrecked by radioactivity, and has dangerous mutants and occasional fireballs.

=== Alhambra Hotel ===
Where Jack begins his quest and meets Speedy Parker. It is a decaying building on the New Hampshire coast; at the end of the novel, it was deserted except for Jack's mother. Its parallel in the Territories is the summer palace of the dying queen. Another location near the hotel is Arcadia Funworld, a decrepit theme park where Speedy works. The Alhambra was also a notable location in King's novel The Tommyknockers.

=== Oatley Tap ===
A bar in the fictional western New York town of the same name.

=== Sunlight Gardener's School ===
When Jack and Wolf are accused of mischievous "hitchhiking" and "trouble-making" by a highway police officer, they are sent by the court to a camp/school for troubled youths run by evangelist Robert "Sunlight" Gardner/Osmond. It is located in eastern Indiana and parallels a terrible open pit mine in the Territories where slaves are used to gather radioactive ore for Morgan. Jack and Wolf are held as wards of the state in the Sunlight Home for one month.

=== Thayer School ===
A boarding school for wealthy boys in Springfield, Illinois. Jack meets up with his friend Richard here.

=== Agincourt Hotel ===
The hotel is located in the ruined town of Point Venuti on the northern California coast. It is a mysterious abandoned black structure similar to the Alhambra. It holds the Talisman and has many different incarnations depending on the alternate universe. In the Territories, it appears as a black castle. As Jack approaches the Talisman, the changing shapes of the building reveal to the reader that there are many other worlds beyond just the Territories and America.

== Reception ==
Anticipation for the book was strong, with the publisher financing a US$550,000 (equivalent to $1,704,000 in 2025) promotional budget. The hardback edition spent 12 weeks at #1 on The New York Times Best Seller List, with a total of 23 weeks on the list.

Critical reception, however, was mixed. Kirkus Reviews called it: "pretentious, verbose, psycho-gothic/philosophical fantasy," while acknowledging the "gripping sequences along the way". The New York Times says: The Talisman has inherited the worst traits of both its parents. From Mr. King it has acquired, among other things, his compulsion to list brand-name products, his affinity for pop-cult teen-age junk and his penchant for the endless repetition of cryptic italicized phrases. From Mr. Straub the book has come by a literary self-consciousness, an almost ink-stained scholarliness, and an over-fascination with complicated magic effects."

== Adaptations ==
The Talisman has been adapted into a 2008 short film and a graphic novel much like The Stand and The Dark Tower. The first issue was published in October 2009. Del Rey planned to run "at least 24 issues"; however, only six issues were published.

A feature-length film version has been in planning for decades, and was in development by Amblin Partners and The Kennedy/Marshall Company with a script by Chris Sparling before being cancelled. In 2021, it was revealed that Amblin would be developing the novel as a Netflix television series, with the Duffer Brothers helping with development. In December 2025, the Duffer Brothers confirmed that the series would no longer be happening at Netflix.
