= The General's Wife =

- Cover of the first edition
- Author: Peter Straub
- Illustrator: Thomas Canty
- Cover artist: Thomas Canty
- Language: English
- Genre: Horror short story
- Publisher: Donald M. Grant, Publisher, Inc.
- Publication date: 1982
- Publication place: United States
- Media type: Print (Hardback)
- Pages: 128 pp
- ISBN: 0-937986-54-2
- OCLC: 9340704
- Dewey Decimal: 813/.54 19
- LC Class: PS3569.T6914 G4 1982

The General's Wife is a horror short story by Peter Straub. It was first published in 1982 by Donald M. Grant, Publisher, Inc. in an edition of 1,200 copies and was issued without a jacket. The story is from a previously unpublished extract from the manuscript of Straub's novel, Floating Dragon.
