= Black House (novel) =

2001 novel by Stephen King and Peter Straub

- First edition cover
- Author: Stephen King, Peter Straub
- Audio read by: Frank Muller
- Cover artist: Mary Steinbacher
- Language: English
- Series: Jack Sawyer Trilogy
- Genre: Horror
- Publisher: Random House
- Publication date: September 15, 2001
- Publication place: United States
- Media type: Print (hardcover)
- Pages: 625
- ISBN: 978-0-375-50439-6
- Preceded by: The Talisman
- Followed by: Other Worlds Than These

Black House is a horror novel by American writers Stephen King and Peter Straub. Published in 2001, it is the sequel to their 1984 novel The Talisman, and was followed by Other Worlds Than These (2026). It is one of King's numerous novels, such as Hearts in Atlantis and Insomnia, which tie in with his Dark Tower series. Black House was nominated for the Bram Stoker Award for Best Novel.

== Setting ==
The novel is set in Straub's homeland of Wisconsin, rather than in King's frequently used backdrop of Maine. The town of "French Landing" is a fictionalized version of Trempealeau, Wisconsin. Many nearby areas are mentioned, such as Onalaska, Sparta, and Madison, or fictionalized, such as La Riviere for La Crosse, Arden for Arcadia, and Centralia, named for nearby Centerville, located at the intersection of Highway 93 and Highway 35. A chapter of the book is written around Edgar Allan Poe's poem "The Raven".

== Plot summary ==
A series of murders has begun to plague the town of French Landing, Wisconsin. The murderer is dubbed "The Fisherman," due to a conscious effort by the killer to emulate the methods of serial killer Albert Fish. Like Fish, French Landing's killer targets children and indulges in cannibalism of the bodies. Two victims have already been discovered as the story opens, with a third awaiting discovery. The nature of the crimes, and the local police's inability to capture the killer, have led people all over the region to become more anxious with each passing day, and certain elements of the local media exacerbate the situation with inflammatory and provocative coverage.

Jack Sawyer has repressed the memories of his childhood adventures in "The Territories" and his hunt for the Talisman as a twelve-year-old boy; (Note: As depicted in The Talisman (1984)) however, the residue of these events has served to subtly affect his life even after he has forgotten them. Jack grew up to become a lieutenant in the Los Angeles Police Department, where his professionalism and uncanny talent have helped him establish a nearly legendary reputation. When a series of murders in Los Angeles are traced to a farm insurance salesman from French Landing, Wisconsin, Jack cooperates with the French Landing police to capture the killer. While in Wisconsin, Jack is irresistibly enraptured by the natural beauty of the Coulee Country, echoing his reaction to The Territories as a child. When he later intrudes upon a homicide investigation in Santa Monica, certain aspects of the crime scene threaten to revive his repressed memories. He subsequently resigns from the LAPD, moving to French Landing to enjoy his early retirement.

When the Fisherman begins to terrorize French Landing, the police all but beg "Hollywood" Jack Sawyer for his assistance; they are surprised when Jack flatly refuses. Memories of the Santa Monica event threaten to overwhelm Jack, and he fears that involving himself in the investigation may affect his sanity. When a fourth child is taken by the Fisherman, events no longer allow Jack to remain aloof. It quickly becomes apparent to him that the Fisherman is much more than a serial killer. In fact, he is an agent of the Crimson King, and his task is to find children with the potential to serve as Breakers. The fourth victim, Tyler Marshall, is one of the most powerful Breakers there has ever been, and he may be all the Crimson King needs to break the remaining beams of the Dark Tower and bring an end to all worlds. As the Fisherman also proves capable of "flipping" into The Territories, Jack Sawyer is the only hope of not just French Landing, but of all existence.

== Terms ==
- Abbalah: The Crimson King.
- Coppiceman: A word that Jack uses to refer to policemen, most notably himself. The word was taken from Wolf's erroneous pronunciation of policeman in the previous book, The Talisman.
- D'Yamba: A magic word Jack uses that invokes the power of good.
- Opopanax: Jack is almost haunted by the word opopanax at the beginning of the story. Its meaning is given as: "describing a word that cannot be found in the dictionary." It is also the name of the feather in Wolves of the Calla that is used to summon the Calla folken to a palaver. The term is also passed to anyone desiring to speak during the palaver.
- Twinner: A twinner is a person's counterpart or double in another world. In the language of the Territories, "twinner" translates as "harp," which in Jack's mind conjures the image of two strings "a finger touch away".

== Sequel ==
Straub died in 2022. In 2023, King mooted writing a third instalment of the Talisman series, saying: "Before he died, Peter sent me this long letter and said we oughta do the third one, and he gave me a really cool idea and I had some ideas of my own." Later, in January 2025, King confirmed he had started writing the third book, titled Other Worlds Than These. The book was released on October 6, 2026.
