= Julia (novel) =

1975 novel by Peter Straub

- Author: Peter Straub
- Language: English
- Genre: Horror
- Published: 1975, Coward, McCann & Geoghegan
- Publication place: United States
- Media type: Print
- Pages: 287
- ISBN: 0698106954
- Preceded by: Under Venus
- Followed by: If You Could See Me Now

Julia is a 1975 novel by American writer Peter Straub. The work is Straub's first novel to deal with the supernatural and was published through Coward, McCann & Geoghegan. Julia was later adapted into the 1977 film Full Circle (released in the USA as The Haunting of Julia), starring Mia Farrow.

The work is Straub's third novel and his second published novel, as Under Venus was not officially published until 1984. Straub began writing Julia at the advice of his literary agent after Under Venus was rejected by his publishers, as his agent recommended that he try writing a gothic novel.

== Synopsis ==
Julia Lofting has just purchased a large house in London as a means of escaping her overbearing husband, Magnus, and to start her life over following the death of her nine-year-old daughter, Kate. But she begins to suspect that she is not alone, and after a seance is held at her home she comes to fear that a malevolent supernatural presence is stalking her.
