= Raggedy Man =

1981 film by Jack Fisk

- Theatrical release poster
- Directed by: Jack Fisk
- Written by: William D. Wittliff
- Based on: Raggedy Man; 1979 novel by William D. Wittliff; Sara Clark
- Produced by: Terry Nelson; Burt Weissbourd; William D. Wittliff
- Starring: Sissy Spacek; Eric Roberts; Sam Shepard
- Cinematography: Ralf D. Bode
- Edited by: Edward Warschilka
- Music by: Jerry Goldsmith
- Distributed by: Universal Pictures
- Release date: September 18, 1981
- Running time: 94 minutes
- Country: United States
- Language: English
- Budget: $9 million
- Box office: $2 million

Raggedy Man is a 1981 American drama film based on William D. Wittliff and Sara Clark's 1979 novel, and directed by Jack Fisk. It follows a divorced mother and telephone switchboard operator (Sissy Spacek) living with her two sons in a small town during World War II. The film was Spacek's first film after her Academy Award-winning performance in Coal Miner’s Daughter, and was also her first film to be directed by her husband. For this role, Spacek received a Golden Globe nomination for Best Actress in a Motion Picture - Drama. This was the directorial debut for Fisk, and the film debut for Henry Thomas, who next starred in his breakout role of Elliott Taylor for the film E.T. the Extra-Terrestrial (1982).

== Plot ==
Nita Longley is a divorced mother of two boys and a World War II switchboard operator working for a telephone company in Gregory, Texas, having split from her unfaithful husband, Harry senior, four years prior. The sole operator for the small town, Nita is on-call day and night. She petitions her boss Mr. Rigby for a secretarial job with regular working hours, but Rigby tells her that because of wartime her job is “frozen” and that everyone has to make sacrifices.

Nita's status as a single mother makes her the target of not only town gossip but also of unwanted attention from men. Two brothers, Calvin and Arnold Triplett, frequently peep in on and harass Nita at her home. One of the townspeople is the nameless “raggedy man”, a man with a disfigured face who is always dragging around a lawnmower. The raggedy man is usually seen lurking in the background when the brothers try to intimidate Nita's sons, Harry and Henry.

One night, Teddy Roebuck, a US Navy sailor on leave, arrives at Nita's doorstep in need of a pay phone so he can contact his fiancée. A heartbroken Teddy learns his fiancée is involved with another man. Nita offers Teddy a cup of coffee to cheer him up, and they form a bond. With nowhere else to go, Teddy decides to spend the rest of his leave with Nita and her sons. He becomes close with the boys and takes them on a bus trip to a beachside carnival, and he and Nita fall in love.

After Calvin and Arnold try to get a peek at Nita bathing, Nita telephones Sheriff Watson to report a peeping Tom. The sheriff does not find anyone, and tells Nita that everyone in town is talking about the stranger staying with her. When Nita mentions having seen the facially disfigured raggedy man near her house, the sheriff explains it is a harmless drifter named Bailey, who has been mowing lawns the past couple of years.

After Teddy and Nita have sex, Teddy is seen shirtless on Nita's porch, sparking more gossip. Calvin and Arnold are particularly bothered, still angry at her rejection. They lure Henry to the town bar and try to ask him intimate questions about Nita. Teddy walks in and stops Arnold and Calvin, causing a fight.

Nita and Teddy agree it would be best for him to leave town. The boys sadly bid Teddy goodbye, and Harry resentfully blames Teddy's departure on his mother. When Harry protests he wants to go to live with his father, Nita counters that his father has never returned for him.

When Rigby again rejects her job transfer, Nita buys one-way bus tickets to San Antonio. That night, Harry goes outside to use the outhouse, but Calvin locks him inside. He and Arnold begin to sexually assault Nita, but the raggedy man cuts the lights, then starts Calvin's truck, honks the horn, and aims its lights at the front porch. When Arnold steps outside with a knife to investigate, the two wrestle, and Arnold stabs him. After a struggle, the raggedy man kills both Arnold and Calvin before they can harm Nita and her sons. Nita finds Bailey dead on the porch. Looking closer at his disfigured face, Nita realizes the raggedy man is Harry senior.

The next day, Nita and her sons board the bus to San Antonio. Harry is happy that their father returned to protect them, and they agree they will see Teddy again.

== Cast ==
- Sissy Spacek as Nita
- Eric Roberts as Teddy
- Sam Shepard as Bailey
- William Sanderson as Calvin
- Tracey Walter as Arnold
- R. G. Armstrong as Rigby
- Henry Thomas as Harry
- Carey Hollis Jr. as Henry

== Reception ==
=== Critical response ===
On the review aggregator website Rotten Tomatoes, 83% of 6 critics' reviews are positive, with an average rating of 6.5/10. Metacritic, which uses a weighted average, assigned the film a score of 61 out of 100, based on 9 critics, indicating "generally favorable" reviews.

In his review which awarded the film 3 and 1/2 stars, critic Roger Ebert opined that while the melodramatic ending and reveal was unnecessary, the “surface events of small-town life are wonderfully observed”. Ebert praised the performances of Spacek as well as of Roberts, writing, “He is often overwrought in his acting; here, playing more quietly, [Roberts] expresses great reserve of tenderness and strength, and is very effective”.

=== Box office ===
In the United States and Canada, Raggedy Man grossed $2 million at the box office, against a budget of $9 million.
