= A Short Guide to the City =

"A Short Guide To The City"
- Short story by Peter Straub
- Country: United States
- Language: English
- Genre: Horror

Publication
- Published in: Houses Without Doors
- Publication type: Collection
- Publisher: Dutton Adult
- Media type: Print (Hardcover)
- Publication date: November 30, 1990

"A Short Guide to the City" is a 1990 horror short story by American writer Peter Straub collected in Houses Without Doors. It combines two disparate literary forms: a self-congratulatory travel brochure published by an unnamed city's Chamber of Commerce, and a news report about the murderous killing spree of a so-called "viaduct killer."

== Plot summary ==
An omniscient narrator moves through a seemingly idyllic Midwestern town relating the often dark and violent histories of various sociological groups which populate the metropolis. He speaks as both a representative of the city, definitively summing up its residents' collective views on life, and as a biased observer, subtly commenting on those views. In an indictment on small-town life, he points out the city's arrogant insularity and refusal to acknowledge the darker elements of its past. While so doing, he also describes the details of the "viaduct killer's" murders and the resulting citywide interest.

In examining the subcultures of the city folk, the identity of the killer is hinted at repeatedly. The most affluent residents are decadent, secretive, and afflicted by inbreeding both literal and figurative. The Eastern European communities are known for engaging in ritualistic acts of domestic violence, self-mutilation, and murder. Feral children, organized into warring tribes after abandonment by social services, live in ramshackle treehouse-like structures constructed from garbage and prey on tourists. Meanwhile, the city has purposefully remained ignorant of those who dwell in the ghetto. The evidence brought forth about each group could point to any one as the breeding ground for the much sought-after "viaduct killer," but the culprit's cultural identity remains unresolved. The story ends with a description of "the Broken Span," an unfinished bridge which is the most iconic symbol of the city.

== Reception ==
The New York Times book critic Walter Kendrick described the piece as Houses Without Doors' "most chilling story" and "its most blatantly artistic one", while fellow The New York Times critic Christopher Lehmann-Haupt found it "a shade too vague and portentous to absorb the reader completely."

== References to other works ==
The description of the Irish children's encounter with a winged elderly man who speaks in a different language is a reference to Gabriel García Márquez's short story "A Very Old Man with Enormous Wings".
