= If You Could See Me Now (Straub novel) =

1977 novel by Peter Straub

- Author: Peter Straub
- Language: English
- Genre: Horror
- Published: 1977, Coward, McCann & Geoghegan
- Publication place: United States
- Media type: Print
- Pages: 287

If You Could See Me Now is a horror novel by American author Peter Straub. It is his third novel and his second work of gothic or supernatural fiction. The book was published by Jonathan Cape in June 1977 – the same London publisher who published Julia in 1976. Coward, McCann & Geoghegan published an American edition also in June 1977.

== Synopsis ==
A psychological novel of sexual slayings, lost love, the twisted nature of truth, and of ghosts in the real and figurative sense If You Could See Me Now tells the story of Miles Teagarden, a thirty-three-year-old recently widowed English professor from the East Coast of the United States, who in the summer of 1975 returns to the Midwestern town of Arden, Wisconsin, which was once home to his maternal grandmother, now deceased. Miles is struggling to complete his doctoral dissertation in order to keep his position at an unnamed educational institution in the East, and hopes the isolation of the Mississippi River farmland known to him in his youth might aid him in his goal.

Teagarden is a troubled man with a tragedy-haunted past, whose personal problems may or may not be of an inwardly serious nature. Throughout his adult life, certain people around him have treated him with suspicion and dislike; he has frequently been the object of whispered rumors of an ill-defined nature. Immediately prior to the novel's start, Teagarden has just lost his estranged wife due to drowning, and finds himself less than welcome upon his arrival in the Wisconsin town in which he intends to spend a summer writing.

Teagarden experiences what he describes as "olfactory hallucinations", which cause him to assign certain imaginary smells to people he encounters, odors such as blood, water, tooth decay, or various chemicals. He relates having experienced a supernatural event in the form of a ghostly stagecoach spilling down a dangerous stretch of roadway one night in the recent past, and acknowledges that he harbors an unquenchable obsession with his San Francisco-born cousin, Alison Greening, a year his senior. This obsession played a role in the recent failure of his marriage.

Twenty years earlier – on the night of July 21, 1955 – Miles made a vow with his cousin Alison that they would meet again at the family farm in Arden, Wisconsin on the same night in 1975. Miles' expectations of his cousin keeping this meeting make up much of the novel's first half and lead to a shocking revelation that begins the second portion of the work, which shifts radically in tone and theme, as very quickly Miles' work on his dissertation falls away and he becomes obsessed with memories of the fateful summer of 1955.

In the present (1975) several young women have been murdered in the area around Arden, and the suspicions of both the police force and the citizens of the town fall on Miles, who soon comes to believe that Alison may be responsible for the deaths. The novel's plot assumes the form of Miles' quest to learn the truth about the 1975 slayings, and unravel the complex scenario that ended his involvement with Alison in 1955, and in so doing colored Miles' life for the next twenty years.

== Themes and connections to other works ==
The novel introduces themes that appear throughout Straub's later novels: the alienated intellectual returning home; digging through layers of memory and history to make sense of violent events in childhood; serial killers; a fictionalized rural Wisconsin setting; and the overwhelming power and attraction of sex and violence.

The protagonist, Miles Teagarden, also has a cameo in Straub's novel Shadowland in which he appears at an Arizona boarding school (described by Teagarden in If You Could See Me Now as "prison-like") to inform new pupils about the institution's rules and regulations.
