= Lost boy, lost girl =

2003 novel by Peter Straub

lost boy, lost girl
- First edition
- Author: Peter Straub
- Language: English
- Genre: Horror
- Published: October 14, 2003
- Publisher: Random House
- Publication place: United States
- Media type: Print
- Pages: 320
- ISBN: 1-4000-6092-3
- Followed by: In the Night Room

lost boy, lost girl is a 2003 horror/suspense novel by American writer Peter Straub. The book won the 2003 Bram Stoker Award for Best Novel and was a 2004 August Derleth Award nominee.

== Synopsis ==
The novel revolves around a middle-aged writer named Timothy Underhill, struggling to help his brother Philip and his nephew, Mark, cope with the recent suicide of Philip's wife, Nancy. A perplexing series of events revolving around a haunted house, a pedophilic serial killer and the lost girl of the title, is triggered when Mark suddenly goes missing and is suspected to be the latest victim of the killer. Mark had begun to harbor an obsession, after the death of his mother, with an abandoned house on the Underhills' street. Timothy and Philip struggle to connect the threads of this mystery and find Mark before he falls victim to the horrors of the abandoned home; horrors both human and supernatural in nature.

A sequel, In the Night Room (2004), continues the story.
