= Consequences (Cather story) =

1915 short story by Willa Cather

- Short story by Willa Cather
- Country: United States
- Language: English
- Genre: Short story

Publication
- Published in: McClure's
- Publication type: Magazine
- Publication date: November 1915

"Consequences" is a short story by Willa Cather. It was first published in McClure's in November 1915.

== Plot summary ==
Kier Cavenaugh picks up his neighbour Henry Eastman on his way back to their apartment building in New York City. Back in his flat, Eastman needs a German language dictionary to prepare a case. He goes down to his neighbour's to ask if he can borrow his, and there a man seems to have just left his apartment through the window. Eastman leaves unfazed, too busy with work.

On New Year's Eve Eastman decides to stay in, and Cavenaugh comes along. They talk about suicide, especially bachelors like them who have committed suicide. Cavenaugh explains how he first met the man who is stalking him. His car had broken down and the man was supposed to help him tow him home. The man was delirious but seemed to know everything about him, every single detail even from schooldays, any memory likely to put him down. Eastman suggests moving to Montana for a while - that way the stalker would get bored and leave him alone.

A couple of days later, Cavenaugh tells Eastman he shall follow his counsel. However, the next day he is found to have killed himself in his apartment.

== Characters ==
- Henry Eastman, a lawyer in his forties.
- Kier Cavenaugh, Eastman's neighbour.
- Rollins, Eastman's servant.
- the stalker
- Dudley, a late friend of Eastman's.
- Rosina, Dudley's wife.
- Dr Johnson
- Wyatt, a rich bachelor who decided to spend all his money and commit suicide.
- Captain Jack Purden, a married man who decided to commit suicide.
- Charley Burke
- Brian, Cavenaugh's late twin brother. He died when he was sixteen years old.
- Harry, Cavenaugh's driver.

== Major themes ==
- Suicide

== References to other works ==
- Lancelot is mentioned in passing.
