= Mrs. God (novel) =

1990 novel by Peter Straub

- Cover of the first edition
- Author: Peter Straub
- Illustrator: Rick Berry
- Cover artist: Rick Berry
- Language: English
- Genre: Fantasy
- Publisher: Donald M. Grant, Publisher, Inc.
- Publication date: 1990
- Publication place: United States
- Media type: Print (Hardback)
- Pages: 201, iv
- ISBN: 0-937986-96-8 (deluxe edition); ISBN 0-937986-97-6 (trade edition)
- OCLC: 24427510
- Dewey Decimal: 813/.54 20
- LC Class: PS3569.T6914 M77 1990

Mrs. God is a fantasy novel by American writer Peter Straub. It was first published in 1990 by Donald M. Grant, Publisher, Inc. in an edition of 1,350 copies, of which 600 copies were signed by the author and the artist, bound in quarter leather and slipcased as a deluxe edition. The novel is expanded from the short novel of the same name that appeared in Straub's collection Houses Without Doors. A trade edition hardcover was issued later.

== Summary ==
The novel, a modern Gothic, concerns an American professor, William Standish, who is researching the poems of his grandmother Isobel Standish at an English manor, Esswood House, home and estate of the Seneschal family, aristocratic patrons of the literary arts for well over a hundred years. D. H. Lawrence, T. S. Eliot, Ford Madox Ford, and Henry James were amongst those privileged to call themselves guests and Esswood Fellows. We learn that Isobel Standish found in Esswood a respite from the outer world, and in its refined atmosphere an inspiration for her work. There was always talk of a hidden secret in Esswoods past, and the Seneschal children were often pale and sickly. For Prof William Standish, fleeing the unfaithfulness of his wife and her previous abortion, and her second pregnancy, which he believes is the result of an affair she had with an academic rival, Esswood offers him the chance to study Isobel's private manuscripts at close hand, which thrills him beyond his wildest ambitions.

At the same time, he finds himself at sea in England with its different customs, and especially at Esswood, a grand Gothic pile, with its meals served by invisible servants, its rococo library, its hidden basements containing bones and giant dollhouses. Drawn into a nightmarish landscape where he is pursued by dead babies, or births of various kinds (one of Isobel's manuscripts is titled 'B.P.' which he interprets as 'Birth of the Past'), he hears faint laughter in the halls, the pitter-pattering of small feet in the night; strange faces appear in the windows of the library. Standish is increasingly unable to distinguish fact from reality as, caught in a vortex of hallucinatory images, he is subject to the unfolding of the dark secrets of Esswood.

== Sources ==
- Brown, Charles N.; William G. Contento (November 20, 2007). "The Locus Index to Science Fiction (1984-1998)".
- Chalker, Jack L.; Mark Owings (1998). The Science-Fantasy Publishers: A Bibliographic History, 1923-1998. Westminster, MD and Baltimore: Mirage Press, Ltd. p. 334.
- Clute, John; John Grant (1997). The Encyclopedia of Fantasy. New York: St. Martin's Press. p. 902. ISBN 0-88184-708-9.
