= In the Night Room =

2004 novel by Peter Straub

- Hardcover edition
- Author: Peter Straub
- Language: English
- Genre: Horror
- Published: 2004, Random House
- Publication place: United States
- Media type: Print, audiobook, e-book
- Pages: 352
- ISBN: 1400062527
- Preceded by: Lost Boy, Lost Girl

In the Night Room is a 2004 horror-thriller novel by American author Peter Straub, a sequel to his 2003 book Lost Boy, Lost Girl. The work was first published in hardback on October 26, 2004, through Random House and it won the 2004 Bram Stoker Award for Novel. Straub encountered some difficulties while writing In the Night Room and had written several different passages for the work before growing bored with each version before writing it using the same technique he used for its predecessor in which he "reached down inside the book and turned it inside out."

== Synopsis ==
The novel follows Timothy Underhill, an author. He is still struggling to come to terms with the loss of his sister April and Timothy tries to channel his sorrow and frustrations into a new novel he is writing, without much success. This is all made more difficult by Timothy receiving several e-mails from people he knows to be dead, all of whom insist that they have something very important they need to tell him. At the same time Newberry Award-winning author Willy Patrick is afraid for her own sanity, as she believes that her daughter is being held captive in a warehouse - despite knowing that her daughter is already dead. As the story progresses the stories of Willy and Timothy entwine and the two must find a way to discern what is going on and what they can do to prevent any further misfortunes.

== Themes ==
Of the themes in the work, professor Gary K. Wolfe wrote that Straub used "metatextual and metafictional chapters, anagrams, and coded messages" to "repeatedly create a feeling of revelatory horror, for both Underhill and the reader". He also commented on Straub's narrative techniques in In the Night Room and Lost Boys, Lost Girls, which he felt "[called] into question the nature of fantasy and the nature of narrative reality and serve as a meditation on the purposes, methods, and limits of fiction as a way to frame experience, particularly when that experience involves extreme or traumatic events."

== Reception ==
Critical reception for In the Night Room has been mostly positive, and The Washington Post praised it as being "a powerful and arresting foray into the dark fantastic". The Philadelphia Inquirer commented that the book was "more poignant than frightening" and that "What makes the story so compelling is the mysterious correlation between Underhill's personal demons and the demonic figures and horrendous events he writes about". The New York Times wrote a mixed review as they felt that Straub used many genre cliches and that the character of Underhill was occasionally unappealing while venting about his writing process but also felt that his characterization in the earliest chapters of the book was apt.
