= Floating Dragon =

Novel by Peter Straub

- Author: Peter Straub
- Language: English
- Genre: Horror
- Published: 1982, Underwood-Miller
- Publication place: United States
- Media type: Print
- Pages: 515 (first edition hardcover)
- ISBN: 0-399-12772-0

Floating Dragon is a horror novel by American writer Peter Straub, originally published by Underwood-Miller in November 1982 and G.P. Putnam's Sons in February 1983. The novel won the August Derleth Award in 1984.

== Plot ==
Set during the spring and summer of 1980 in the fictional Connecticut town of Hampstead, a housewife named Stony Friedgood picks up a man at a bar but is brutally murdered by the patron. At the same time, her husband Leo, who works for the U.S. Department of Defense, becomes involved in the cover up of an incident in which DRG-16, a deadly nerve gas, escapes containment and contaminates the town. Leo works to stop the public from finding out about the leak, which has already killed three men at the lab. When he arrives home, the gas is already above Hampstead, causing deaths and hallucinations.

Meanwhile, three descendants of the founders of Hampstead are introduced: Richard Allbee, a former child actor turned architect with a wife and child on the way, who returns from London and is plagued by dreams and visions of his deceased co-star Billy Bentley; Patsy McCloud, the abused wife of Les McCloud, who has psychic abilities and dreams of escaping her husband; and Tabby Smithfield, a young child with an alcoholic father, who has similar abilities to Patsy. Graham Williams, an elderly historian and author, connects with the other three, and reveals to them the existence of an evil entity in the town that he calls the Dragon. This powerful entity becomes active every thirty years and has reason to want revenge on Hampstead, its founders and their descendants.

The Dragon was originally a businessman called Gideon Winter, who lived two hundred years ago and was responsible for the murders of several women and children. He was discovered and lynched by the founders, and in his supernatural form, he lives on to pursue his vendetta against the town and its inhabitants. During each cycle of activity, the Dragon drives people to commit atrocities by possessing them psychically. Graham has experience of this, and recounts the story of Bates Krell, a manifestation of the Dragon whom he confronted and killed thirty years previous. Since then, Graham has devoted himself to uncovering the history of the Dragon, which he now shares with the other three.

Meanwhile, a series of escalating incidents occur in Hampstead. These are partly connected to the gas contamination but are also linked to a new manifestation of the Dragon. The Dragon's new host is a local man, Dr Wren Van Horne. Tabby reluctantly accompanies three teenagers to Van Horne's home, where they are attacked. Tabby escapes, but his companions are killed. Several children drown themselves on the town beach; policemen murder each other during an annual meeting at a movie theater; a group of firefighters die when they spontaneously combust trying to stop several houses from burning; Leo escapes town but dies in the streets of New York City; and local reporter Sarah Spry and her friend Ulick Byrne attempt to uncover the secret of Hampstead.

More evil and terrifying hallucinations brought on by the Dragon cause chaos in the town. As the novel progresses, the Dragon tries to split the group and demotivate them: Les, Patsy's husband, is killed during a drive after a dog kills itself when it crashed into his car; Richard comes home from work to find his pregnant wife murdered; Tabby's home catches fire, his father kills his stepmother, and they are both consumed by the flames; and Graham visits Kendall Point, a notorious spot, and nearly falls to his death.

The government discovers the contamination and failed cover-up as reporters discover the events happening in Hampstead. Sarah and Ulick, after investigating, arrive at the home of former killer Bates Krell and are attacked by Van Horne. Tabby arrives at Van Horne's manor with Patsy, in an attempt to stop the Dragon. They meet one of the surviving teenagers, Bruce Norman, who helps them break in. They shoot and kill Van Horne, but a disembodied version of the Dragon kidnaps Tabby and burns the house down. At the same time, Graham and Richard, figuring out what Tabby planned to do, are attacked by a dog at Williams' home, but manage to escape with Graham's shotgun.

The two, along with Patsy, journey to Krell's old home and are bombarded with terrifying hallucinations. They enter a tunnel and several caverns where each individual is tested by the Dragon: Patsy sees the victims of the Dragon in a chamber, in them Sarah, Ulick, and her husband Les; Richard returns to the set of the show he acted in and is attacked by Billy Bentley; and Graham is confronted by his infidelities to his wives. They arrive underneath Kendall Point and rescue Tabby. The Dragon appears, in the form of a literal dragon, and causes an earthquake.

The four enter a large cave created by the Dragon. Patsy unites the group with her powers and gives them the strength and courage to face the Dragon. Singing “When the Red, Red, Robin Comes Bob, Bob, Bobbin’ Along”, a song that has always given him comfort, Richard uses a shotgun which transforms into a sword to stab the Dragon and kill him, seemingly ending the cycle. The four escape Kendall Point before it cracks and falls into the ocean, along with Van Horne’s mansion and a few buildings. The four regroup at Graham’s home.

The novel ends with Patsy moving with a new boyfriend to New York, then somewhere south; Richard remarrying and adopting Tabby, who goes to college; and Graham publishing his account of the recent events as a novel – Floating Dragon – and agreeing with Patsy to meet again soon.

== Main characters ==
- Richard Allbee: an architect and former child actor in his mid-thirties, and a descendant of one of the four original families that settled Hampstead (then called Greenbank) in 1645. As a young boy, Richard starred as the youngest child on a Leave It to Beaver-style family sitcom called Daddy's Here that aired in the 1950s. As an adult, Richard is plagued by memories of his former co-star, Billy Bentley, who played his character's older brother on the series, and was later shot in an altercation over drugs, after sliding into a life of petty crime and drug abuse.
- Graham Williams: a novelist and screenwriter whose career was destroyed when he was labeled a Communist sympathizer for refusing to testify before the House Unamerican Activities Committee. Born and raised in Hampstead, Williams had his first brush with the sinister forces plaguing the town as a young man, when he discovered the identity of a serial killer, Bates Krell, responsible for the deaths of several local women, and later killed the man during a violent confrontation. Afterward, Williams (who, like Richard, is also a descendant of one of the original founding families) became obsessed with researching the history of the town, eventually discovering a "cycle" of death and mayhem that seems to visit the area once in a generation (or approximately once every thirty-odd years).
- Patsy McCloud. Also a descendant of one of the founding families, Patsy (like her grandmother before her) is possessed of a variety of psychic abilities, including telepathy, precognition, post-cognition, and, in particular, the ability to know when people she encounters are near death. After spending most of her life trying to suppress her abilities, she learns to embrace them after meeting Graham, Richard, and Tabby Smithfield, a young boy with similar powers.
- Tabby Smithfield: the last descendant of the town's founding families, Tabby is a 13-year-old boy with various psychic abilities similar to those possessed by Patsy McCloud; after their discovery of the powers they share, Patsy and Tabby form a close bond. Though born into wealth and privilege, Tabby has spent most of his life moving from city to city with his father, Clark Smithfield, whose alcoholism and inability to hold down a steady job have left Tabby without much stability in his life. Tabby's mother was killed in a car accident when he was six years old.
- Gideon Winter (also known as The Dragon): a fifth settler who arrived in Greenbank not long after the original four families and quickly bought up most of the land in town. Winter (dubbed "the Dragon" by local farmers, presumably because of his ruthless business practices) disappeared mysteriously following a rash of child murders in the area; Graham Williams believes he was murdered by members of the four families, thus leading to his centuries-long vendetta against the citizens of Hampstead, and particularly the descendants of the town's founding fathers. According to Graham, Winter's spirit returns to the area approximately once every thirty years to commit a series of murders; the end of each cycle is usually marked by a large-scale disaster of some sort (an earthquake in one case, a fire that destroys half the town in another). The novel is unclear as to whether the spirit of Winter is responsible for all the apparently supernatural happenings in the town, or if some other, older evil may have plagued the area since before human habitation. It is strongly implied although never explicitly stated in the novel that each of the four protagonists is descended from Winter through illegitimate children borne by the wives of the town's founders, and that this may be the source of Patsy and Tabby's psychic abilities.

== Reception ==
The novel provoked mixed reactions on release: critics commented on its apparent debt to Lovecraft, its dispassionate, literary style, its many loose ends and its length, which some felt to be excessive. Kirkus Reviews criticized it as over-long and over-complicated, though acknowledging its readability. In a Twilight Zone magazine review, Thomas M. Disch said, referring to the novel's length: “Things that go bump in the night are generally scarier than things that go bump bump bump bump bump bump bump bump”. By contrast,The Washington Post called it: "a thoughtful and intelligent novel that is compulsively readable."

== Legacy ==
- The 1987 novel The Tommyknockers by Stephen King references Floating Dragon when Bobbi Anderson tells Jim Gardener about the novel and describes plot from it.

== See also ==
- 1983 in literature
- The General's Wife
