= Thomas Tessier =

American novelist (1947–2026)

- Born: May 10, 1947 (age 79); Waterbury, Connecticut, United States
- Died: March 26, 2026; Watertown, Connecticut, United States
- Occupations: Novelist, Poet, Playwright
- Writing career
- Genres: Horror, Science fiction
- Website: www.thomastessier.com

Thomas Edward Tessier (May 10, 1947 – March 26, 2026) was an American writer of horror novels and short stories. He has also written poetry and drama.

== Overview ==
Tessier was born in Waterbury, Connecticut United States, attended University College Dublin and lived in London in the United Kingdom for several years (where he was the managing director of Millington Books) before returning to the United States. His three published books of poetry are How We Died (New Writers Press, Dublin 1970), In Sight of Chaos (Turret Books, London 1971) and Abandoned Homes (Gallery Press, Dublin 1971). His plays have been produced, but not published.

His first book, The Fates (1978), is an episodic hybrid of horror and science fiction, about a mysterious force which causes death and destruction in an American town. One of the characters speculates that the Earth is revenging itself on humanity, but at the end of the book the mystery has not been solved and the destruction has not stopped.

Tessier's next book was The Nightwalker (1979), the brief, terse story of a young American Vietnam veteran adrift in London who seems possessed by an uncontrollable urge to inflict mutilation and death and may, in fact, be a werewolf. In Shockwaves (1982), a young woman achieves an ambition out of romantic fiction when an up-and-coming lawyer asks her to marry him; but her life is overshadowed by the presence of an apparently supernatural murderer known only as The Blade. Phantom (1982) deals with a young boy's confrontations with death, starting with his mother's dangerous asthma attack and ending with a disturbing vision of the afterlife.

Besides works of supernatural horror, Tessier has also written non-supernatural stories such as Rapture (1987), about a psychopathic stalker, and Secret Strangers (1990), about a teenage girl whose father's sudden disappearance prompts her to an amoral rebellion which leads to the discovery of a suburban child abuse ring.

Tessier's other novels include Finishing Touches (1986), about a young doctor (again, an American alone in London) drawn into the sadistic world of a megalomaniac plastic surgeon; Fog Heart (1997), about the involvement of two married couples with a suicidal young medium; and Father Panic's Opera Macabre (2001), in which a writer of bland historical fiction is suddenly confronted with the atrocities which occurred in Croatia during the Second World War.

A short novel, Wicked Things, was published in 2007, accompanied by a novella, "Scramburg, USA".

Tessier's short fiction has been collected in Ghost Music and Other Tales (2000) and Remorseless: Tales of Cruelty (2013), World of Hurt (2019), and featured in Night Visions.

Tessier was married to the former Alice Audietis. They have one son and one daughter.

== Critical reception ==
In a review of Tessier's novel Phantom, Karl Edward Wagner stated "What does make Phantom an effective chiller is its terrifying portrayal of the isolation of childhood fears." In the same article, Wagner also praised Tessier's novel Nightwalker as "the best werewolf novel of the last fifty years."

== Awards ==
=== Bram Stoker Award ===
- Fog Heart (1998) - finalist

=== International Horror Guild Award ===
- Fog Heart (1998) - winner
- Ghost Music (2000) - winner
- Father Panic's Opera Macabre (2001) - finalist
- "The Goddess of Cruelty" (2003) - finalist

=== World Fantasy Award ===
- Phantom (1983) - finalist

== Works ==
=== Poetry collections ===
- How We Died (1970)
- In Sight of Chaos (1971)
- Abandoned Homes (1971)
- miguel de ghelderode (1971)

=== Novels ===
- The Fates (1978)
- The Nightwalker (1979)
- Shockwaves (1982)
- Phantom (1982)
- Finishing Touches (1986)
- Rapture (1987)
- Secret Strangers (1990)
- Fog Heart (1997)
- Father Panic's Opera Macabre (2001)
- Wicked Things (2007)

=== Short story collections ===
Ghost Music and Other Tales (2000)

Includes the following stories:

- "Food"
- "Blanca"
- "The Banshee"
- "Evelyn Grace"
- "In Praise of Folly"
- "A Grub Street Tale"
- "Infidel"
- "La Mourante"
- "I Remember Me"
- "The Last Crossing"
- "The Dreams of Dr. Ladybank"
- "Lie Down With Us"
- "Wax"
- "Curing Hitler"
- "Ghost Music"
- "Lulu"
- "Nightsuite"
- "Figures in Scrimshaw"
- "In the Desert of Deserts"
- "Nocturne"

Remorseless: Tales of Cruelty (2013)

Includes the following stories:

- "Back In My Arms, I Want You"
- "Premature Noxia"
- "The Inn of Distant Sorrows"
- "In the Sand Hills"
- "For No One"
- "If You See Me, Say Hello"
- "Goo Girl"
- "Club Saudade"
- "Something Small and Gray, and Quick"
- "The Woman in the Club Car"
- "The God Thing"
- "Fine, Until You Called"
- "The Ventriloquist"
- "10-31-2001"
- "The Infestation at Ralls"

World of Hurt (2019)

- In the Desert of Deserts
- The Vacant Lot
- Evelyn Grace
- The Banshee
- Blanca
- A Grub Street Tale
- Ghost Music
- La Mourante
- The Infestation at Ralls
- Infidel
- The Woman in the Club Car
- Curing Hitler
- The Green Menace
- In Praise of Folly
- The Ventriloquist
- Torching the Escalade
- Food
- Nocturne
- Club Saudade
- For No One
- Lulu
- If You See Me, Say Hello
- In the Sand Hills
- 10-31-2001
- I Remember Me
- The Dreams of Dr. Ladybank
- Scramburg, USA
- Father Panic's Opera Macabre
