= World Fantasy Award—Novel =

Literary award for science fiction or fantasy novels in English

- Awarded for: The best fantasy story of 40,000 words or more published in English in the prior calendar year
- Presented by: World Fantasy Convention
- First award: 1975
- Most recent winner: M. R. Carey (Once Was Willem)
- Website: worldfantasy.org/awards/

The World Fantasy Awards are given each year by the World Fantasy Convention for the best fantasy fiction published in English during the previous calendar year. The awards have been described by book critics such as The Guardian as a "prestigious fantasy prize", and one of the three most prestigious speculative fiction awards, along with the Hugo and Nebula Awards (which cover both fantasy and science fiction). The World Fantasy Award—Novel is given each year for fantasy novels published in English or translated into English. A work of fiction is defined by the organization as a novel if it is 40,000 words or longer; awards are also given out for pieces of shorter lengths in the Short Fiction and Long Fiction categories. The Novel category has been awarded annually since 1975.

World Fantasy Award nominees and winners are decided by attendees and judges at the annual World Fantasy Convention. A ballot is posted in June for attendees of the current and previous two conferences to determine two of the finalists, and a panel of five judges adds three or more nominees before voting on the overall winner. The panel of judges is typically made up of fantasy authors and is chosen each year by the World Fantasy Awards Administration, which has the power to break ties. The final results are presented at the World Fantasy Convention at the end of October. Winners were presented with a statue in the form of a bust of H. P. Lovecraft through the 2015 awards; more recent winners receive a statuette of a tree.

During the 52 nomination years, 188 authors have had works nominated; 53 of them have won, including ties. Five authors have won twice: Gene Wolfe, out of eight nominations; Tim Powers, out of five; Patricia McKillip, out of four; Jeffrey Ford, out of three; and James K. Morrow for both of his nominations. Wolfe has the most nominations for an author who has won at least once, while Stephen King has the most nominations without winning, at nine, followed by Charles L. Grant at six and Jonathan Carroll at five.

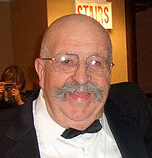
Gene Wolfe is one of only five authors who have won the World Fantasy Award Novel category twice.

== Winners and nominees ==
In the following table, the years correspond to the date of the ceremony, rather than when the novel was first published. Each year links to the corresponding "year in literature". Entries with a yellow background and an asterisk (*) next to the writer's name have won the award; the other entries are the other nominees on the shortlist.

* Winners

Winners and nominees
Year	Author	Novel	Publisher(s)/publication	Ref.
1975	Patricia A. McKillip*	The Forgotten Beasts of Eld	Atheneum Books	
1975	H. Warner Munn	Merlin's Ring	Ballantine Books	
1975	Poul Anderson	A Midsummer Tempest	Doubleday	
1976	Richard Matheson*	Bid Time Return	Viking Press	
1976	Stephen King	'Salem's Lot	Doubleday	
1977	William Kotzwinkle*	Doctor Rat	Alfred A. Knopf	
1977	John Steinbeck	The Acts of King Arthur and His Noble Knights	Farrar, Straus and Giroux	
1977	Karl Edward Wagner	Dark Crusade	Warner	
1977	Ramsey Campbell	The Doll Who Ate His Mother	Bobbs-Merrill Company	
1977	Gordon R. Dickson	The Dragon and the George	Ballantine Books	
1977	Michael Moorcock	The Sailor on the Seas of Fate	Quartet, DAW Books	
1978	Fritz Leiber*	Our Lady of Darkness	Berkley Books	
1978	Stephen R. Donaldson	The Chronicles of Thomas Covenant, the Unbeliever	Holt, Rinehart & Winston	
1978	Charles L. Grant	The Hour of the Oxrun Dead	Doubleday	
1979	Michael Moorcock*	Gloriana	Avon Publications	
1979	Les Daniels	The Black Castle	Charles Scribner's Sons	
1979	Tanith Lee	Night's Master	DAW Books	
1979	Charles L. Grant	The Sound of Midnight	Doubleday	
1979	Stephen King	The Stand	Doubleday	
1980	Elizabeth A. Lynn*	Watchtower	Berkley Books	
1980	Elizabeth A. Lynn	The Dancers of Arun	Berkley Books	
1980	Patricia Wrightson	The Dark Bright Water	Atheneum Books	
1980	Patricia A. McKillip	Harpist in the Wind	Atheneum Books	
1980	Charles L. Grant	The Last Call of Mourning	Doubleday	
1980	Chelsea Quinn Yarbro	The Palace	St. Martin's Press	
1981	Gene Wolfe*	The Shadow of the Torturer	Simon & Schuster	
1981	Chelsea Quinn Yarbro	Ariosto	Pocket Books	
1981	Parke Godwin	Firelord	Doubleday	
1981	Stephen King	The Mist	Dark Forces (Viking Press)	
1981	Peter Straub	Shadowland	Coward, McCann & Geoghegan	
1982	John Crowley*	Little, Big	Bantam Books	
1982	Gene Wolfe	The Claw of the Conciliator	Timescape Books	
1982	Ramsey Campbell	The Nameless	Macmillan Publishers	
1982	Michael Moorcock	The War Hound and the World's Pain	Timescape Books	
1982	D. M. Thomas	The White Hotel	Viking Press	
1983	Michael Shea*	Nifft the Lean	DAW Books	
1983	George R. R. Martin	Fevre Dream	Poseidon Press	
1983	Charles L. Grant	The Nestling	Pocket Books	
1983	Thomas Tessier	Phantom	Atheneum Books	
1983	Gene Wolfe	The Sword of the Lictor	Timescape Books	
1984	John M. Ford*	The Dragon Waiting	Timescape Books	
1984	George R. R. Martin	The Armageddon Rag	Poseidon Press	
1984	Jack Vance	Lyonesse	Berkley Books	
1984	Stephen King	Pet Sematary	Doubleday	
1984	R. A. MacAvoy	Tea with the Black Dragon	Bantam Books	
1984	Manuel Mujica Lainez	The Wandering Unicorn	Taplinger	
1985	Barry Hughart*	Bridge of Birds	St. Martin's Press	
1985	Robert Holdstock*	Mythago Wood	Victor Gollancz	
1985	Diana Wynne Jones	Archer's Goon	Methuen Publishing	
1985	T. E. D. Klein	The Ceremonies	Viking Press	
1985	Stephen King	The Talisman	Viking Press	
1985	Peter Straub	The Talisman	Viking Press	
1986	Dan Simmons*	Song of Kali	Bluejay Books	
1986	Clive Barker	The Damnation Game	Weidenfeld & Nicolson	
1986	Lisa Goldstein	The Dream Years	Bantam Spectra	
1986	Peter Carey	Illywhacker	Harper & Row	
1986	Anne Rice	The Vampire Lestat	Alfred A. Knopf	
1986	Paul Hazel	Winterking	Atlantic Monthly Press	
1987	Patrick Süskind*	Perfume	Alfred A. Knopf	
1987	Stephen King	It	Viking Press	
1987	Charles L. Grant	The Pet	Tor Books	
1987	Gene Wolfe	Soldier of the Mist	Tor Books	
1987	Dean Koontz	Strangers	Putnam Publishing Group	
1987	Terry Bisson	Talking Man	Arbor House	
1987	Margaret Mahy	The Tricksters	J. M. Dent & Sons	
1988	Ken Grimwood*	Replay	Arbor House	
1988	John Crowley	Ægypt	Bantam Spectra	
1988	Stephen King	Misery	Viking Press	
1988	Tim Powers	On Stranger Tides	Ace Books	
1988	Orson Scott Card	Seventh Son	Tor Books	
1988	Robert R. McCammon	Swan Song	Pocket Books	
1988	Clive Barker	Weaveworld	Poseidon Press, William Collins, Sons	
1989	Peter Straub*	Koko	E. P. Dutton, Viking Press	
1989	Joe R. Lansdale	The Drive-In	Bantam Spectra	
1989	Robert Cormier	Fade	Victor Gollancz, Delacorte Press	
1989	James Blaylock	The Last Coin	Mark V. Ziesing, Ace Books	
1989	Thomas Harris	The Silence of the Lambs	St. Martin's Press	
1989	Jonathan Carroll	Sleeping in Flame	Legend, Doubleday	
1990	Jack Vance*	Madouc	Underwood–Miller	
1990	Dan Simmons	Carrion Comfort	Dark Harvest	
1990	Jonathan Carroll	A Child Across the Sky	Legend, Century	
1990	Charles L. Grant	In a Dark Dream	Tor Books	
1990	Gene Wolfe	Soldier of Arete	Tor Books	
1990	Tim Powers	The Stress of Her Regard	Ace Books	
1991	James K. Morrow*	Only Begotten Daughter	William Morrow and Company	
1991	Ellen Kushner*	Thomas the Rhymer	William Morrow and Company	
1991	Terry Pratchett	Good Omens	Victor Gollancz, Workman Publishing Company	
1991	Neil Gaiman	Good Omens	Victor Gollancz, Workman Publishing Company	
1991	Valerie Martin	Mary Reilly	Doubleday	
1991	Guy Gavriel Kay	Tigana	Viking Press	
1992	Robert R. McCammon*	Boy's Life	Pocket Books	
1992	Emma Bull	Bone Dance	Ace Books	
1992	A. A. Attanasio	Hunting the Ghost Dancer	HarperCollins	
1992	Charles de Lint	The Little Country	William Morrow and Company	
1992	Jonathan Carroll	Outside the Dog Museum	Macdonald	
1992	James Blaylock	The Paper Grail	Ace Books	
1993	Tim Powers*	Last Call	William Morrow and Company	
1993	Kim Newman	Anno Dracula	Simon & Schuster, Carroll & Graf Publishers	
1993	Jane Yolen	Briar Rose	Tor Books	
1993	Steve Szilagyi	Photographing Fairies	Ballantine Books	
1993	Geoff Ryman	Was	HarperCollins, Alfred A. Knopf	
1994	Lewis Shiner*	Glimpses	William Morrow and Company	
1994	Poppy Z. Brite	Drawing Blood	Delacorte Abyss	
1994	Peter S. Beagle	The Innkeeper's Song	Roc Books	
1994	Michael Swanwick	The Iron Dragon's Daughter	Millennium, Morrow AvoNova	
1994	Judith Tarr	Lord of the Two Lands	Tor Books	
1994	Kathe Koja	Skin	Delacorte Abyss	
1994	Peter Straub	The Throat	E. P. Dutton, Borderlands Press	
1995	James K. Morrow*	Towing Jehovah	Harcourt Brace	
1995	Michael Bishop	Brittle Innings	Bantam Books	
1995	Brooke Stevens	The Circus of the Earth and the Air	Harcourt Brace	
1995	Jonathan Carroll	From the Teeth of Angels	HarperCollins, Doubleday	
1995	John Crowley	Love & Sleep	Bantam Books	
1995	Elizabeth Hand	Waking the Moon	HarperCollins, HarperPrism	
1996	Christopher Priest*	The Prestige	Touchstone Books	
1996	James Blaylock	All the Bells on Earth	Ace Books	
1996	Tim Powers	Expiration Date	HarperCollins, Tor Books	
1996	Vikram Chandra	Red Earth and Pouring Rain	Little, Brown and Company	
1996	Graham Joyce	Requiem	Michael Joseph, Signet Creed	
1996	Nina Kiriki Hoffman	The Silent Strength of Stones	AvoNova	
1997	Rachel Pollack*	Godmother Night	St. Martin's Press	
1997	Marc Laidlaw	The 37th Mandala	St. Martin's Press	
1997	William Kotzwinkle	The Bear Went Over the Mountain	Doubleday	
1997	Mark Sumner	Devil's Tower	Del Rey Books	
1997	George R. R. Martin	A Game of Thrones	HarperCollins Voyager, Bantam Spectra	
1997	Melanie Rawn	The Golden Key	DAW Books	
1997	Jennifer Roberson	The Golden Key	DAW Books	
1997	Kate Elliott	The Golden Key	DAW Books	
1997	Terence M. Green	Shadow of Ashland	Forge Books	
1998	Jeffrey Ford*	The Physiognomy	Avon Publications	
1998	Harvey Jacobs	American Goliath	St. Martin's Press	
1998	Arturo Pérez-Reverte	The Club Dumas (nomination withdrawn) (Note: The Club Dumas, originally published in Spanish in 1993, was initially nominated for its 1997 English publication, but the nomination was withdrawn when a 1996 English translation came to light. It was replaced on the ballot with Dry Water by Eric Nylund.)	Harcourt Brace	
1998	Eric Nylund	Dry Water	Avon Publications	
1998	Patrick O'Leary	The Gift	Tor Books	
1998	Charles de Lint	Trader	Tor Books	
1999	Louise Erdrich*	The Antelope Wife	HarperFlamingo	
1999	Thomas Sullivan	The Martyring	Forge Books	
1999	Sean Stewart	Mockingbird	Ace Books	
1999	Guy Gavriel Kay	Sailing to Sarantium	Earthlight, Viking Press	
1999	Charles de Lint	Someplace to Be Flying	Tor Books	
2000	Martin Scott*	Thraxas	Orbit Books	
2000	Steven Erikson	Gardens of the Moon	Bantam Books	
2000	James Blaylock	The Rainy Season	Ace Books	
2000	Nina Kiriki Hoffman	A Red Heart of Memories	Ace Books	
2000	Peter S. Beagle	Tamsin	Roc Books	
2000	Terence M. Green	A Witness to Life	Forge Books	
2001	Tim Powers*	Declare	Subterranean Press, William Morrow and Company	
2001	Sean Stewart*	Galveston	Ace Books	
2001	Philip Pullman	The Amber Spyglass	Scholastic, Alfred A. Knopf	
2001	Paula Volsky	The Grand Ellipse	Bantam Spectra	
2001	Guy Gavriel Kay	Lord of Emperors	Viking Press, HarperPrism	
2001	China Miéville	Perdido Street Station	Macmillan Publishers, Del Rey Books	
2002	Ursula K. Le Guin*	The Other Wind	Harcourt	
2002	Neil Gaiman	American Gods	William Morrow and Company	
2002	Jay Russell	Brown Harvest	Four Walls Eight Windows	
2002	Lois McMaster Bujold	The Curse of Chalion	Eos	
2002	Ray Bradbury	From the Dust Returned	William Morrow and Company	
2002	Charles de Lint	The Onion Girl	Tor Books	
2002	Jonathan Carroll	The Wooden Sea	Tor Books	
2003	Graham Joyce*	The Facts of Life	Victor Gollancz	
2003	Patricia A. McKillip*	Ombria in Shadow	Ace Books	
2003	Gregory Frost	Fitcher's Brides	Tor Books	
2003	Jeffrey Ford	The Portrait of Mrs. Charbuque	William Morrow and Company	
2003	China Miéville	The Scar	Macmillan Publishers, Del Rey Books	
2004	Jo Walton*	Tooth and Claw	Tor Books	
2004	K. J. Bishop	The Etched City	Prime Books	
2004	Kij Johnson	Fudoki	Tor Books	
2004	Ian R. MacLeod	The Light Ages	Ace Books	
2004	Jeff VanderMeer	Veniss Underground	Prime Books	
2005	Susanna Clarke*	Jonathan Strange & Mr Norrell	Bloomsbury Press	
2005	China Miéville	Iron Council	Del Rey Books, Macmillan Publishers	
2005	Sean Stewart	Perfect Circle	Small Beer Press	
2005	Stephen R. Donaldson	The Runes of the Earth	Putnam Publishing Group, Victor Gollancz	
2005	Gene Wolfe	The Wizard Knight	Tor Books	
2006	Haruki Murakami*	Kafka on the Shore	Harvill Press, Alfred A. Knopf	
2006	Graham Joyce	The Limits of Enchantment	Victor Gollancz, Atria	
2006	Bret Easton Ellis	Lunar Park	Alfred A. Knopf, Macmillan Publishers	
2006	Patricia A. McKillip	Od Magic	Ace Books	
2006	Paul Park	A Princess of Roumania	Tor Books	
2006	Hal Duncan	Vellum	Macmillan Publishers, Del Rey Books	
2007	Gene Wolfe*	Soldier of Sidon	Tor Books	
2007	Scott Lynch	The Lies of Locke Lamora	Victor Gollancz, Bantam Spectra	
2007	Stephen King	Lisey's Story	Charles Scribner's Sons, Hodder & Stoughton	
2007	Catherynne M. Valente	In the Night Garden	Bantam Spectra	
2007	Ellen Kushner	The Privilege of the Sword	Bantam Spectra, Small Beer Press	
2008	Guy Gavriel Kay*	Ysabel	Viking Press, Roc Books	
2008	John Marks	Fangland	Penguin Press	
2008	Will Shetterly	The Gospel of the Knife	Tor Books	
2008	Michael Marshall Smith	The Servants	Earthling Publications	
2008	Emma Bull	Territory	Tor Books	
2009	Jeffrey Ford*	The Shadow Year	William Morrow and Company	
2009	Margo Lanagan*	Tender Morsels	Allen & Unwin, Alfred A. Knopf	
2009	Neil Gaiman	The Graveyard Book	HarperCollins, Bloomsbury Press	
2009	Kage Baker	The House of the Stag	Tor Books	
2009	Daryl Gregory	Pandemonium	Del Rey Books	
2010	China Miéville*	The City & the City	Macmillan Publishers, Del Rey Books	
2010	James Enge	Blood of Ambrose	Pyr	
2010	Jeff VanderMeer	Finch	Underland Press	
2010	Kit Whitfield	In Great Waters	Jonathan Cape, Del Rey Books	
2010	Caitlín R. Kiernan	The Red Tree	Roc Books	
2011	Nnedi Okorafor*	Who Fears Death	DAW Books	
2011	N. K. Jemisin	The Hundred Thousand Kingdoms	Orbit Books	
2011	Karen Lord	Redemption in Indigo	Small Beer Press	
2011	Graham Joyce	The Silent Land	Victor Gollancz, Doubleday	
2011	Guy Gavriel Kay	Under Heaven	Viking Press, Roc Books	
2011	Lauren Beukes	Zoo City	Jacana Media, Angry Robot	
2012	Lavie Tidhar*	Osama	DAW Books	
2012	Stephen King	11/22/63	Charles Scribner's Sons	
2012	Jo Walton	Among Others	Tor Books	
2012	George R. R. Martin	A Dance with Dragons	Tor Books	
2012	Christopher Buehlman	Those Across the River	Ace Books	
2013	G. Willow Wilson*	Alif the Unseen	Grove, Corvus	
2013	N. K. Jemisin	The Killing Moon	Orbit Books	
2013	Graham Joyce	Some Kind of Fairy Tale	Victor Gollancz	
2013	Caitlín R. Kiernan	The Drowning Girl	Roc Books	
2013	Anna Tambour	Crandolin	Chomu Press	
2014	Sofia Samatar*	A Stranger in Olondria	Small Beer Press	
2014	Richard Bowes	Dust Devil on a Quiet Street	Lethe Press	
2014	Marie Brennan	A Natural History of Dragons: A Memoir by Lady Trent	Tor Books	
2014	Neil Gaiman	The Ocean at the End of the Lane	William Morrow and Company	
2014	Helene Wecker	The Golem and the Jinni	Harper	
2014	Gene Wolfe	The Land Across	Tor Books	
2015	David Mitchell*	The Bone Clocks	Random House	
2015	Jeff VanderMeer	Area X: The Southern Reach Trilogy	Farrar, Straus and Giroux	
2015	Robert Jackson Bennett	City of Stairs	Jo Fletcher Books	
2015	Katherine Addison	The Goblin Emperor	Tor Books	
2015	Jo Walton	My Real Children	Tor Books	
2016	Anna Smaill*	The Chimes	Sceptre	
2016	N. K. Jemisin	The Fifth Season	Orbit Books	
2016	Naomi Novik	Uprooted	Del Rey Books	
2016	K. J. Parker	Savages	Subterranean Press	
2016	Kazuo Ishiguro	The Buried Giant	Alfred A. Knopf	
2016	Paul Tremblay	A Head Full of Ghosts	William Morrow and Company	
2017	Claire North*	The Sudden Appearance of Hope	Redhook Books	
2017	Mishell Baker	Borderline	Saga Press	
2017	Matt Ruff	Lovecraft Country	Harper	
2017	N. K. Jemisin	The Obelisk Gate	Orbit Books	
2017	Betsy James	Roadsouls	Aqueduct Press	
2018	Victor LaValle*	The Changeling	Spiegel & Grau	
2018	Fonda Lee*	Jade City	Orbit Books	
2018	S. A. Chakraborty	The City of Brass	Harper Voyager	
2018	John Crowley	Ka: Dar Oakley in the Ruin of Ymr	Saga Press	
2018	Daryl Gregory	Spoonbenders	Alfred A. Knopf	
2018	Theodora Goss	The Strange Case of the Alchemist's Daughter	Saga Press	
2019	C. L. Polk*	Witchmark	Tor.com Publishing	
2019	Dale Bailey	In the Night Wood	John Joseph Adams Books	
2019	Maria Dahvana Headley	The Mere Wife	MCD	
2019	R. F. Kuang	The Poppy War	Harper Voyager	
2019	Rebecca Roanhorse	Trail of Lightning	Saga Press	
2020	Kacen Callender*	Queen of the Conquered	Orbit Books	
2020	Alix E. Harrow	The Ten Thousand Doors of January	Redhook Books/Orbit UK	
2020	Ann Leckie	The Raven Tower	Orbit Books	
2020	Tamsyn Muir	Gideon the Ninth	Tor.com Publishing	
2020	Yōko Ogawa	The Memory Police	Pantheon Books/Harvill Secker	
2020	Stephen Snyder (translator)	The Memory Police	Pantheon Books/Harvill Secker	
2021	Alaya Dawn Johnson*	Trouble the Saints	Tor Books	
2021	Susanna Clarke	Piranesi	Bloomsbury Press	
2021	Stephen Graham Jones	The Only Good Indians	Saga Press/Titan UK	
2021	Silvia Moreno-Garcia	Mexican Gothic	Del Rey Books/Jo Fletcher UK	
2021	C. L. Polk	The Midnight Bargain	Erewhon/Orbit UK	
2022	Tasha Suri*	The Jasmine Throne	Orbit Books	
2022	Zen Cho	Black Water Sister	Ace Books/Macmillan Publishers	
2022	Aden Polydoros	The City Beautiful	Inkyard Press	
2022	Catriona Ward	The Last House on Needless Street	Nightfire Books/Viper Books	
2022	P. Djèlí Clark	A Master of Djinn	Tor.com Publishing/Orbit UK	
2023	C. S. E. Cooney*	Saint Death's Daughter	Solaris Books	
2023	R. F. Kuang	Babel	Harper Voyager	
2023	Alex Jennings	The Ballad of Perilous Graves	Redhook Books/Orbit UK	
2023	Nghi Vo	Siren Queen	Tordotcom	
2023	Nicola Griffith	Spear	Tordotcom	
2024	Tananarive Due*	The Reformatory	Saga Press/Titan UK	
2024	Catriona Ward	Looking Glass Sound	Viper Books/Nightfire Books	
2024	Yael Goldstein-Love	The Possibilities	Random House	
2024	Wole Talabi	Shigidi and the Brass Head of Obalufon	DAW Books/Victor Gollancz	
2024	Alix E. Harrow	Starling House	Tor Books	
2024	Martha Wells	Witch King	Tordotcom	
2025	Robert Jackson Bennett*	The Tainted Cup	Del Rey Books/Hodderscape	
2025	Yangsze Choo	The Fox Wife	Henry Holt and Company/Quercus UK	
2025	Kay Chronister	The Bog Wife	Counterpoint/Titan UK	
2025	Lev Grossman	The Bright Sword	Viking Press/Del Rey UK	
2025	Samantha Mills	The Wings Upon Her Back	Tachyon Publications	
2026	M. R. Carey*	Once Was Willem	Orbit Books	
2026	Martin Cahill	Audition for the Fox	Tachyon Publications	
2026	Giovanni De Feo	The Secret Market of the Dead	Saga Press	
2026	Alix E. Harrow	The Everlasting	Tor Books	
2026	Pat Murphy	The Adventures of Mary Darling	Tachyon Publications	
