= The Chronicles of Tornor =

Fantasy series by Elizabeth A. Lynn

The Chronicles of Tornor is a fantasy series by American author Elizabeth A. Lynn. The first book in the series, Watchtower (1979), won a World Fantasy Award for Best Novel; its sequel, The Dancers of Arun (1979) was nominated for a World Fantasy Award in the same year. It is one of the earliest fantasy series to feature positive gay protagonists whose relationships are an unremarkable part of the cultural background, as well as to present explicit and sympathetic depictions of same-sex love. The third title in the series is ''The Northern Girl'' (1980).

== Watchtower ==
Tornor Keep, in the frozen north of the country of Arun, is violently taken by Col Istor, a southern mercenary leader looking to take over the entire north. He kills Athor, the lord of the keep, and takes two prisoners: Athor's son Errel and watch commander Ryke, who agrees to serve Col as long as Errel is left alive. With the aid of two ostensibly genderless "ghyas" of Arun's Green Clan, Ryke plans an escape, hoping to return and take Tornor back from Col. However, while in the hidden province of Vanima, Ryke experiences a world free of war, rank, and gender roles, focused more on community and cooperation, and tries his hardest to adhere to the "chea," the conscious action of each human to keep the world in balance. As Ryke leans toward retaking Tornor and Errel embraces this new life, the two (as well as their companions, Sorren and Norres) must come to a decision that will determine Tornor's role in Arun's future.

== The Dancers of Arun ==
Many generations later, the chea is better known and understood throughout Arun, and groups of dancers called "chearas" are thought to keep the world in balance with their performances and their willingness to teach sword combat to every village and city they visit. Kerris, a young and disabled scribe working in Tornor, experiences "fits" which he learns are part of a "witch-gift" that allows him to connect to the mind of his brother, Kel, who belongs to a famous chearas. Traveling south to the city of Elath with Kel's chearas, Kerris must learn to accept himself for who he is and learn more about his gift from Sefer, Kel's lover and builder of the first "Tanjo," a school for witches, in the process dealing with a potentially deadly threat from the Asech, desert-dwelling tribes who demand to be taught in the use of witch-gifts.

== The Northern Girl ==
A century later, southern bondservant Sorren works for Arré Med, head of the Med family, whose ancestor built and established Tornor Keep. Chearas have disappeared due to the establishing of the ambitious and arrogant White Clan, witches who built two additional Tanjos and then banned swords from all of Arun's big cities (and whose leader wishes to rule all of Arun). A possessor of the witch-gift of far-traveling and living in the southern city of Kendra-on-the-Delta, Sorren dreams of going to Tornor, which is now rundown and poor, once her service to Arré ends. Caught in a conspiracy by one of the wealthy Houses to smuggle swords into the city and assassinate Arré, Sorren realizes she can no longer keep her head down if she is to protect those she loves (including her lover, Paxe, the female Yardmaster of the city) and achieve her dreams.

== Reception ==
Richard A. Lupoff praised Watchtower for its "characterization, the solidity of structure and the accomplishment of narration."

== See also ==
- Homosexuality in speculative fiction
