= Yangsze Choo =

Malaysian writer of Chinese descent

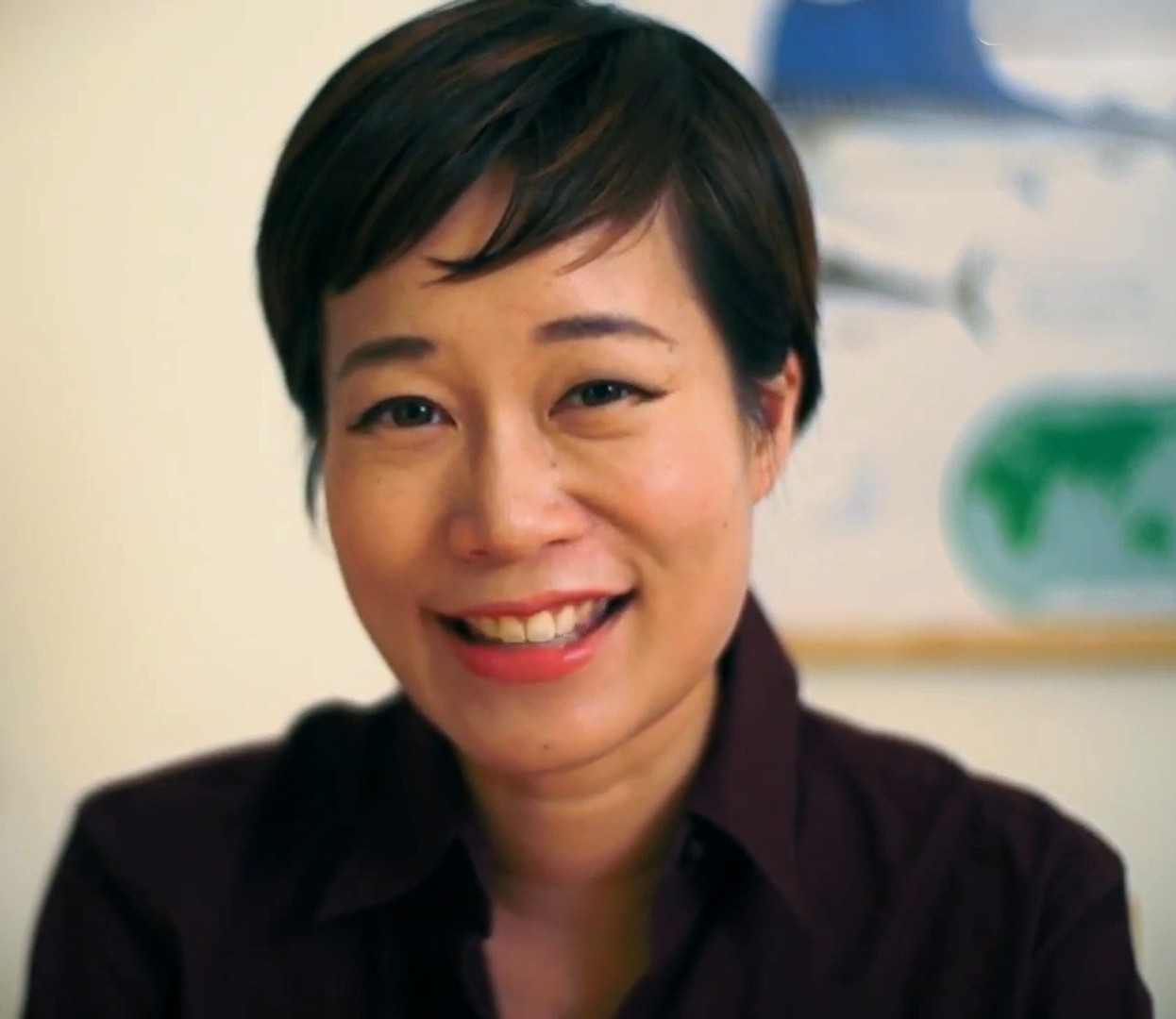
- Choo in 2013
- Born: Philippines
- Education: Harvard University
- Occupation: Novelist
- Writing career
- Genre: Fantasy

Yangsze Choo (Chinese: 朱洋熹; pinyin: Zhū Yángxī) is a Malaysian writer of Chinese descent, whose novel The Night Tiger was selected as one of 70 works in the Big Jubilee Read, a campaign to celebrate the Platinum Jubilee of Elizabeth II.

== Biography ==
Choo was born in the Philippines, to a Malaysian family of Chinese descent. Her father was a diplomat and the family moved frequently, so she spent her formative years in Thailand, Germany, Japan and Singapore. She attended Harvard University and subsequently worked as a management consultant. She began to write after leaving management consultancy to focus on her family, often writing at night.

Her first novel The Ghost Bride took three years to write. It is a fantasy novel, based on the practice of ghost marriage and drawing on Chinese mythology to create its world. It became a New York Times best seller, and was selected as a Best Book by Oprah.com. It later formed the basis of the Netflix-original series The Ghost Bride, which was co-directed by Malaysian directors Quek Shio-chuan and Ho Yu-hang. It starred Huang Pei-jia, Wu Kang-jen, Ludi Lin, and Kuang Tian.

Her second novel, The Night Tiger took four years to write. It is set in 1931 in Malaya, then part of the British Empire, and addresses the Malaysian myth of the weretiger. It was selected as one of 70 works in the Big Jubilee Read, a campaign to celebrate the Platinum Jubilee of Elizabeth II.

Choo published another novel, The Fox Wife, in 2024. It is set in Manchuria in the early 1900s, and centers on a fox spirit hunting for justice. The book was longlisted in 2025 for the International Dublin Literary Award and became a finalist for the World Fantasy Award for best novel.

== Novels ==
- The Ghost Bride (William Morrow & Co., 2013)
- The Night Tiger (Quercus, 2019)
- The Fox Wife: A Novel (2024)

== Reception ==
The Ghost Bride was described by the New York Journal of Books as suitable for readers who want "to learn about cultural tradition or who have tired of either vampire or zombie genre". Critical theorist Anita Harris Satkunananthan, through her analysis of the work, coined the term "Malaysian Chinese Domestic Gothic" to describe the text.

Patricia Schultheis, writing in the Washington Independent Review of Books, described The Night Tiger as a "darn good yarn" that is "free of political polemics and post-colonial self-righteousness".

== Personal life ==
Choo lives in California, with her husband and children, and keeps chickens.
