= Elizabeth A. Lynn =

American novelist (born 1946)

- Born: 1946 (age 79–80)
- Occupation: Writer
- Writing career
- Genres: Fantasy; science fiction
- Notable awards: World Fantasy Award—Novel (1980)

Elizabeth A. Lynn (born 1946) is an American writer most known for fantasy and to a lesser extent science fiction. She is particularly known for being one of the first writers in science fiction or fantasy to introduce gay and lesbian characters; in honor of Lynn, the widely known California and New York–based chain of LGBT bookstores A Different Light took its name from her novel. Her novel Watchtower won the World Fantasy Award in 1980.

== Body of work ==
Elizabeth Lynn is an openly lesbian science fiction and fantasy writer who has written numerous works featuring positive gay protagonists. Her Chronicles of Tornor novels (1979–80) were among the first fantasy novels to have gay relationships as an unremarkable part of the cultural background, and included explicit and sympathetic depictions of same-sex love. This series is composed of Watchtower, The Dancers of Arun (1979); and The Northern Girl (1980) – the last of which is of particular lesbian interest.

Lynn's early science fiction novels were similarly ground-breaking in their treatment of sexual themes. In The Sardonyx Net (1981), one of the primary characters is a sexual sadist. Her science fiction novel A Different Light (1978) featured a same-sex relationship between two men. The magical lesbian tale "The Woman Who Loved the Moon", also a World Fantasy Award winner, is the title story in Lynn's The Woman Who Loved the Moon collection along with other gay speculative fiction stories. Both these novels featured the science fiction concept hyperspace.

Lynn later returned to fiction with a fantasy series, again featuring gay relationships: Dragon's Winter (1998) and Dragon's Treasure (2004).

== Bibliography ==
=== Series ===
- The Chronicles of Tornor
  - Watchtower (1979), ISBN 0-425-05008-4
  - The Dancers of Arun (1979), ISBN 0-425-05189-7
  - The Northern Girl (1980), ISBN 0-425-04725-3
- Karadur Atani
  - Dragon's Winter (1998), ISBN 0-441-00502-0
  - Dragon's Treasure (2003), ISBN 0-441-01196-9

=== Novels ===
- A Different Light (1978), ISBN 0-425-04824-1
- The Sardonyx Net (1981), ISBN 0-425-05326-1

=== Short story collections ===
- The Woman Who Loved the Moon and Other Stories (1981), ISBN 0-425-05161-7
- Tales from a Vanished Country (1990)

=== Novellas ===
- The Red Hawk (1983)

=== Children's books ===
- The Silver Horse (1986) novel, ISBN 0-312-94404-7

=== Non-fiction ===
- Babe Didrikson Zaharias: Champion Athlete (1989) (biography) ISBN 1-55546-684-2

=== Selected short stories ===
- "We All Have to Go" (in Tricks and Treats, 1976)
- "Jubilee's Story" (in Millennial Women, 1978)
- "Wizard's Domain" (in Basilisk, ed. Ellen Kushner, 1980)
- "The Silver Dragon" (in Flights: Extreme Visions of Fantasy, 2004)

== See also ==
- Feminist science fiction
- Homosexuality in speculative fiction
