= Alix E. Harrow =

American writer (born 1989)

- Born: November 9, 1989 (age 36); Idaho, United States
- Education: Berea College (BA); University of Vermont (MA)
- Occupations: Writer, professor
- Writing career
- Years active: 2014–present
- Genres: Science fiction, speculative fiction, fantasy
- Notable works: "A Witch's Guide to Escape" (2018); The Ten Thousand Doors of January (2019); The Everlasting (2025)
- Notable awards: Hugo Award (2019, 2026); British Fantasy Award (2021); Locus Award (2026)
- Website: alixeharrow.wixsite.com/author

Alix E. Harrow (born November 9, 1989) is an American science fiction and fantasy writer. Her short fiction work "A Witch's Guide to Escape: A Practical Compendium of Portal Fantasies" has been nominated for the Nebula Award, World Fantasy Award, and Locus Award, and in 2019 won a Hugo Award. Her debut novel, The Ten Thousand Doors of January (2019), was widely acclaimed and nominated for multiple first novel literary awards and speculative fiction awards.

She has also published under the name Alix Heintzman.

== Early life and education ==
Harrow was born in Idaho and grew up in Colorado and Kentucky. She enrolled at Berea College at age sixteen, where she completed a bachelor's degree in history within three years. She later earned a master's degree in history from the University of Vermont.

== Career ==
Before working as a full-time writer, Harrow was an academic historian who taught as an adjunct professor of African and African American history at Eastern Kentucky University.

Harrow has also written short fiction for Shimmer Magazine, Strange Horizons, Tor.com, and Apex Magazine. This has produced a Hugo Award–winning 2018 short story, "A Witch's Guide to Escape: A Practical Compendium of Portal Fantasies".

Her first novel, The Ten Thousand Doors of January (2019), was received with critical acclaim and nominated for multiple awards, including the Hugo Award, Nebula Award, Locus Award, and World Fantasy Award.

Harrow's second novel, The Once and Future Witches (2020), won a British Fantasy Award for Best Fantasy Novel (the Robert Holdstock Award).

Her fourth novel, The Everlasting, won the 2026 Locus Award for Best Fantasy Novel and the 2026 Hugo Award for Best Novel.

== Personal life ==
Harrow lives in Virginia with her husband and their two children.

== Awards ==
Year	Nominee	Award	Category	Result	Ref
2018	"A Witch's Guide to Escape"	Nebula Award	Short Story	Shortlisted	
2019	"A Witch's Guide to Escape"	Eugie Award	—	Finalist	
2019	"A Witch's Guide to Escape"	Hugo Award	Short Story	Won	
2019	"A Witch's Guide to Escape"	Locus Award	Short Story	Nominated—6th	
2019	"A Witch's Guide to Escape"	World Fantasy Award	Short Fiction	Shortlisted	
2019	"A Witch's Guide to Escape"	WSFA Small Press Award	—	Shortlisted	
2019	The Ten Thousand Doors of January	Goodreads Choice Awards	Debut	Nominated—4th	
2019	The Ten Thousand Doors of January	Goodreads Choice Awards	Fantasy	Nominated—11th	
2019	The Ten Thousand Doors of January	Nebula Award	Novel	Shortlisted	
2020	The Ten Thousand Doors of January	Audie Award	Fantasy	Won	
2020	The Ten Thousand Doors of January	Audie Award	Female Narration	Shortlisted	
2020	The Ten Thousand Doors of January	BFA	Fantasy Novel	Shortlisted	
2020	The Ten Thousand Doors of January	BFA	Newcomer	Shortlisted	
2020	The Ten Thousand Doors of January	Compton Crook Award	—	Shortlisted	
2020	The Ten Thousand Doors of January	Crawford Award	—	Shortlisted	
2020	The Ten Thousand Doors of January	Dragon Awards	Science Fiction Novel	Shortlisted	
2020	The Ten Thousand Doors of January	Hugo Award	Novel	Shortlisted	
2020	The Ten Thousand Doors of January	Kitschies	Golden Tentacle (Debut)	Shortlisted	
2020	The Ten Thousand Doors of January	Locus Award	First Novel	Nominated—3rd	
2020	The Ten Thousand Doors of January	Mythopoeic Awards	Adult Literature	Shortlisted	
2020	The Ten Thousand Doors of January	World Fantasy Award	Novel	Shortlisted	
2020	"Do Not Look Back, My Lion"	Hugo Award	Short Story	Shortlisted	
2020	The Once and Future Witches	Goodreads Choice Awards	Fantasy	Nominated—6th	
2021	The Once and Future Witches	BFA	Fantasy Novel	Won	
2021	The Once and Future Witches	Dragon Awards	Fantasy Novel	Shortlisted	
2021	The Once and Future Witches	Locus Award	Fantasy Novel	Nominated—5th	
2021	"The Sycamore and the Sybil"	Eugie Award	—	Finalist	
2021	"The Sycamore and the Sybil"	Locus Award	Short Story	Nominated—6th	
2021	"Mr. Death"	Nebula Award	Short Story	Shortlisted	
2022	"Mr. Death"	Hugo Award	Short Story	Shortlisted	
2022	"Mr. Death"	Locus Award	Short Story	Nominated—2nd	
2022	A Spindle Splintered	BFA	Novella	Shortlisted	
2022	A Spindle Splintered	Hugo Award	Novella	Shortlisted	
2022	A Spindle Splintered	Locus Award	Novella	Nominated—4th	
2023	A Mirror Mended	Hugo Award	Novella	Shortlisted	
2023	A Mirror Mended	Locus Award	Novella	Nominated	
2023	A Mirror Mended	Southern Book Prize	Fiction	Shortlisted	
2023	Starling House	Goodreads Choice Awards	Fantasy	Nominated—9th	
2024	Starling House	Audie Awards	Fantasy	Shortlisted	
2024	Starling House	Locus Award	Horror Novel	Nominated—3rd	
2024	Starling House	RUSA CODES Reading List	Fantasy	Shortlisted	
2024	Starling House	Southern Book Prize	Fiction	Shortlisted	
2024	Starling House	Virginia Literary Awards	People's Choice (Fiction)	Shortlisted	
2024	Starling House	World Fantasy Award	Novel	Shortlisted	
2025	The Everlasting	Goodreads Choice Awards	Fantasy	Nominated	
2026	The Everlasting	Audie Award	Fantasy	Shortlisted	
2026	The Everlasting	Hugo Award	Novel	Won	
2026	The Everlasting	Locus Award	Fantasy Novel	Won	
2026	The Everlasting	World Fantasy Award	Novel	Shortlisted	

== Bibliography ==
=== Novels ===
- —— (2019). The Ten Thousand Doors of January. Redhook. ISBN 9780316421997.
- —— (2020). The Once and Future Witches. Redhook. ISBN 9780316422048.
- —— (2023). Starling House. Tor Books. ISBN 9781250765369.
- —— (2025). The Everlasting. Tor Books. ISBN 9781250799081.

=== Novellas ===
Fractured Fables series

1. —— (2021). A Spindle Splintered. Tordotcom. ISBN 9781250765352.
2. —— (2022). A Mirror Mended. Tordotcom. ISBN 9781250766649.

=== Short fiction ===
- "A Whisper in the Weld" (2014)
- "The Animal Women" (2015)
- "Dustbaby" (2015)
- "The Autobiography of a Traitor and a Half-Savage" (2016)
- "Patience and Not-Forsaken" (2016)
- "A Witch's Guide to Escape: A Practical Compendium of Portal Fantasies" (2018)
- "Do Not Look Back, My Lion" (2019)
- "The Ransom of Miss Coraline Connelly" (2020)
- "The Sycamore and the Sybil" (2020)
- "Mr. Death" (2021)
- "The Long Way Up" (2022)
- "The Six Deaths of the Saint" (2022)
- "The Knight and the Butcherbird" (2025)
