= The Green Pearl =

1985 novel by Jack Vance

The Green Pearl is a novel by Jack Vance published in 1985. It is the second book in the Lyonesse trilogy, which also includes Suldrun's Garden and Madouc.

== Plot summary ==
In a fishing village in South Ulfland, a fisherman catches a flounder and discovers a green pearl inside.

In Lyonesse, King Casmir plots to destabilize South Ulfland by sending two agents, Sir Shalles and Torqual. Torqual plans to conquer all of the Elder Isles for himself and Casmir soon grows exasperated with Torqual's demands for ever increasing amounts of gold. Casmir is also troubled by a prophecy made at Suldrun's birth that her son would rule the Elder Isles; Casmir believes Suldrun gave birth to a girl, the princess Madouc. He applies to the magician Visbhume, who tells him that Suldrun's child, Madouc, is a fairy changeling.

In South Ulfland, Aillas sees a party of Ska approaching Sank on horseback, including the Lady Tatzel. Aillas pursues and captures her, declaring she is now his slave. Tatzel refuses to accept this, but gradually comes to recognize Aillas' intelligence and competence. Aillas discovers that the Tatzel of reality is nothing like the Tatzel of his daydreams, and the infatuation is broken. They eventually develop a wary mutual respect. After a long series of adventures, Aillas and Tatzel arrive at Xounges, to find the dying King Gax beset by a Ska delegation asking King Gax to appoint a Ska successor to his throne. Aillas returns his unsatisfactory slave to her father, and Gax transfers the crown to Aillas, much to the surprise and consternation of the Ska. Aillas leads a long war campaign which ends with the Ska returning to their own territory.

Glyneth is kidnapped by Visbhume and taken to the alternate world Tanjecterly. Aillas and Shimrod are prevented from following Glyneth through the portal into Tanjecterly by Murgen, who understands that this is part of a plot by Casmir and Tamurello to get rid of them. Murgen instead sends an agent named Kul. Kul catches up with Glyneth and rescues her from Visbhume. Glyneth, though frightened of Kul at first, grows to love him. Visbhume vanishes through the dimensional portal.

At the Goblin Fair in the forest of Tantrevalles, Melancthe is entranced by four beautiful flowers she has bought. Shimrod and Melancthe peruse the booths at the fair. The flower seller, in search of more, has dug up the green pearl, causing the flowers to die, to Melancthe's great disappointment. He offers her the pearl, but Shimrod dissuades her. Tamurello sees it and is captivated, but before he can take it, a snake darts out from the forest and swallows it. Tamurello chants a spell and turns into a weasel, pursues the snake into its hole and returns triumphantly with the pearl in his teeth. Murgen, disguised as a peasant, seals the weasel and pearl in a glass jar. The weasel dissolves into a green transparency, like a skeleton in aspic.

Kul follows his orders implanted to return Glyneth to the location of the other portal. When they reach the portal, Glyneth will not leave Kul, but Shimrod explains that while Kul is dying, his love for her came from someone else. Shimrod and Glyneth return to Earth where she is reunited with Aillas, now the undisputed King of Troicinet, Dascinet and Ulfland, who reveals his deep love for her and asks her to be his Queen, which she gladly accepts.

== Reception ==
Dave Langford reviewed The Green Pearl for White Dwarf #81, and stated that "grimmer than most Vance tales, but always enjoyable for its sheer style – Vance probably writes elegantly ironic and barbed shopping lists."

== Reviews ==
- Review by Faren Miller (1985) in Locus, #291 April 1985
- Review by Don D'Ammassa (1986) in Science Fiction Chronicle, #77 February 1986
- Review by John Gregory Betancourt (1986) in Amazing Stories, March 1986
- Review by Daniel Temianka (1986) in Fantasy Review, June 1986
