= The Everlasting (novel) =

2025 novel by Alix E. Harrow

- First edition cover
- Author: Alix E. Harrow
- Cover artist: Sara Wood
- Language: English
- Genre: Fantasy
- Publisher: Tor Publishing Group
- Publication date: October 28, 2025
- Publication place: United States
- Pages: 400
- ISBN: 9781250799104
- Dewey Decimal: 813.6 23

The Everlasting is a 2025 fantasy novel written by American author Alix E. Harrow. It was released on October 28, 2025, and published by Tor Publishing Group.

In June 2026, Netflix announced the development of a TV adaptation of the book.

== Synopsis ==
After returning home from war, scholar Owen Mallory begins researching the history of Sir Una Everlasting, a knight who helped Queen Yvanne form the nation of Dominion, and ultimately died for her queen and her country. After being given the long-lost original manuscript of Una's story, he discovers his mission is not to translate it but to travel back in time and lead Una through the events that will become the basis of her legend. As he does this, Owen begins to view Una less as the legendary hero of Dominion and more as a human being.

== Reception ==
=== Critical reviews ===
In a starred review of The Everlasting, Publishers Weekly praised it for its "impressively constructed plot" that "keeps the pages flying on the way to a stunning finale." Kirkus Reviews called it "an epic time-travel fantasy about how stories from the past can shape our future." Kristen Allen-Vogel called it "a provocative, heartrending fantasy" in a starred review for Shelf Awareness. Grady Shelton called it "sweet and tender" in a review for SFF Insiders, and wrote that "like the best of the Arthurian legends and other medievalist stories, it comprises many hallmarks of a new classic poised to stand the test of time." Melody Bowles of the British Fantasy Society named it her favorite book of 2025. Gary K. Wolfe praised the novel in his review for Locus, stating that Harrow offers "some of her most gorgeous and lyrical prose to date".

=== Awards ===
Year	Award	Category	Result	Ref.
2025	Goodreads Choice Awards	Fantasy	Nominated	
2026	Audie Award	Fantasy	Finalist	
2026	Hugo Award	Novel	Won	
2026	Locus Award	Fantasy Novel	Won	
2026	World Fantasy Award	Novel	Shortlisted	
