= Starling House =

2023 fantasy novel by Alix E. Harrow

- Author: Alix E. Harrow
- Audio read by: Natalie Naudus
- Language: English
- Genre: Fantasy; Gothic fiction
- Set in: Kentucky
- Publisher: Tor Books (US)
- Publication date: October 3, 2023 (US)
- Publication place: United States
- Pages: 308 pp.
- ISBN: 9781250799050 (hardcover 1st ed.)
- OCLC: 1355028589
- Dewey Decimal: 813
- LC Class: PS3608.A783854 S73 2023

Starling House is a 2023 gothic fantasy novel by American author Alix E. Harrow published by Tor Books. The novel tells a story of a young woman, Opal, who lives in a destitute region of Kentucky, attempting to find an economic means to uplift her brother from poverty and pay for his education. When she accepts the position as maid at the enigmatic Starling House, a mansion shrouded in mystery, she becomes entangled in a web of strange, supernatural and historical secrets that are linked to the town's dark past. At the same time, she resists the exploitation of the land and its people by powerful, profit-driven forces like the pointedly named Gravely Power, striving to secure her brother's future, safeguard Starling House, and assert control over her own destiny.

These themes of resistance and empowerment resonate throughout the novel, which was well received by literary journals and critics. Reviewers highlighted its anti-monopolistic, populist progressive, and environmental messages, along with its mood and Harrow's writing style, as key strengths. It notably received nominations for the World Fantasy Award—Novel and the Locus Award for Best Horror Novel. Its audiobook version, narrated by Natalie Naudus, was shortlisted for the Audie Award for Fantasy. In response to this acclaim from readers and these nominations, a limited edition, with art by Rovina Cai, will be published by early 2025.

== Premise ==
Set in a fictional coal town called Eden, Kentucky, life unfolds amidst hardship for Opal, a young woman struggling to escape poverty. She becomes entangled with the mysterious Starling House, a crumbling Gothic mansion with a dark reputation tied to its history and its reclusive caretaker, Arthur Starling. As Opal takes a job at the house, she begins uncovering secrets about the house's connection to the town's violent past, the mysterious death of its original owner, and the hidden power it holds—all of which are tied to her own family history.

== Characters ==
- Opal – a 26-year-old woman, born and raised in the town; she grew up in poverty with her mother and is attempting to establish a better life as she transitions into adulthood
- Jasper – Opal's teenage brother
- Arthur Starling – the reclusive caretaker of Starling House who has a mysterious connection to the house and its dark history
- Eleanor Starling – The house's original builder and a reclusive widow and author of a mysterious children's book called Underland. Her legacy is central to the house's lore.
- Elizabeth Baine – A corporate agent from Gravely Power, she represents the external threats to Starling House, coercing Opal to spy on the house by threatening her guardianship of Jasper.
- Bev – The tough but kind-hearted owner of the Garden of Eden Motel who provides a place for Opal and Jasper to stay.
- Charlotte – A librarian with a passion for history whose detailed footnotes provide a unique perspective on Eden's past and Starling House.

== Setting ==
The town's economy, history, and societal struggles are deeply tied to coal mining, which adds layers of industrial decay, environmental damage, and class disparity to the narrative. Gravely Power, a coal plant company located in the town, acts a stand-in for the corporate greed in the real world and is a foil to impoverished community members like Opal opposing its exploitative practices. The mine's oppression of the land and its workers serves as a backdrop to the story's diegesis.

Talking about finally making Kentucky, her home state, the locus of one of her books, Harrow said,

This is the first book that I set fully in, like committed to writing about Kentucky. One of the reasons that I had found that difficult to do before is because I find it to be a place of very mixed experiences that I love very, very, very much, and which has just an incredible violence and terror to it.

== Release ==
Special limited edition release by Subterranean Press with custom art by Rovina Cai

The first edition hardcover version of the novel by Macmillan (through Tor Books) was released in October 2023. Barnes & Noble sells a variant of the Tor Books release with "unique printed endpapers, a dazzling unique foil design stamped on the hardcover, and an exclusive original bonus chapter". The audiobook — narrated by Natalie Naudus, who is known for reciting One Last Stop, She Who Became the Sun, He Who Drowned the World, and The House at the End of the World — was released simultaneously.

A limited edition, featuring special art by Rovina Cai, will be released in late 2024 or early 2025 via Subterranean Press, along with a signed lettering edition.

== Reception ==
Starling House was well received by most critics, earning starred reviews from BookPage, Kirkus Reviews, Library Journal, and Publishers Weekly. Booklist also reviewed the novel.

BookPage's consensus was "Harrow's Starling House is a riveting Southern gothic fantasy with gorgeous prose and excellent social commentary." Discussing how truth is perverted by those in power, Kirkus Reviews called it "a spooky story about how hidden truths always come back to haunt you." Library Journal's Kristi Chadwick referred to "Harrow's mash-up of twisted fairy tales and Southern gothic fiction" as "a haunting story of longing, lies, and generational curses."

Southern Review of Books discussed more about the experience of the novel than the primary takeaways, including its immersive elements, saying the "details of Starling House, the small town of Eden, The Underland, the beasts, the landscape, and even the relationships of all the characters are brought to life so thoroughly and decisively that it's hard not to be utterly engulfed in the story." Publishers Weekly's editorial team added, "Starling House will no doubt take its place alongside fiction's most memorable haunted houses".

== Awards ==
Year	Award	Category	Result	Ref.
2023	Goodreads Choice Awards	Fantasy	Nominated—9th	
2024	Audie Awards	Fantasy	Shortlisted	
2024	Locus Award	Horror Novel	Nominated—3rd	
2024	RUSA CODES Reading List	Fantasy	Shortlisted	
2024	Southern Book Prize	Fiction	Shortlisted	
2024	Virginia Literary Awards	People's Choice (Fiction)	Shortlisted	
2024	World Fantasy Award	Novel	Shortlisted	
