= Replay (Grimwood novel) =

1986 novel by Ken Grimwood

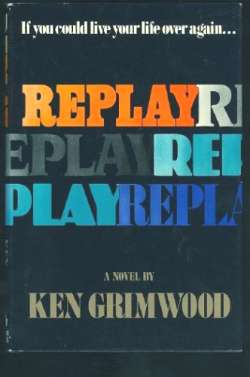
- First edition cover
- Author: Ken Grimwood
- Cover artist: Larry Ratzkin
- Language: English
- Genre: Science fiction
- Publisher: Arbor House
- Publication date: January 1987
- Publication place: United States
- Media type: Print (hardback & paperback)
- Pages: 311 p.
- ISBN: 0-87795-781-9 (hardback edition) & ISBN 0-575-07559-7 (paperback edition)
- OCLC: 13701262
- Dewey Decimal: 813/.54 19
- LC Class: PS3557.R497 R4 1986

Replay is a fantasy novel by American writer Ken Grimwood, first published by Arbor House in 1987. It won the 1988 World Fantasy Award for Best Novel.

The novel tells of a 43-year-old man who dies and wakes up back in 1963 in his 18-year-old body. He relives his life with all his memories of the previous 25 years intact. This happens repeatedly, with the man playing out his life differently in each cycle. The novel was a bestseller in Japan. Its time-loop concept has been referenced as a precursor of Harold Ramis's comedy-drama Groundhog Day (1993). Richard A. Lupoff explored a similar premise in his 1973 short story "12:01". Australian science fiction author Damien Broderick credits the novel with introducing the "Replay" trope wherein time travel is often depicted without any kind of manufactured machine or technology as its source. The novel has also attracted literary analysis outside the genre of science fiction, with author Samuel Berglund arguing it "presents a postmodern rejection of a universal meaning to life" through its use of repetition and "various other postmodern literary techniques."

== Characters and story ==
Replay is the account of 43-year-old radio journalist Jeff Winston, who dies of a heart attack in 1988 and awakens back in 1963 in his 18-year-old body as a student at Atlanta's Emory University. He then begins to relive his life with intact memories of the next 25 years, until, despite his best efforts at cardiac health, he dies of a heart attack, again, in 1988. He immediately returns to 1963, but several hours later than the last "replay". This happens repeatedly with different events in each cycle, each time beginning from increasingly later dates (first days, then weeks, then years, then ultimately decades). Jeff soon realizes that he cannot prevent his death in 1988, but he can change the events that occur before it, both for him, and for others.

During one subsequent replay, Jeff takes notice of a highly acclaimed film, Starsea, that has become a huge success at the box office in 1974. The film is written and produced by an unknown filmmaker, Pamela Phillips, who has recruited Steven Spielberg to direct and George Lucas as a special effects supervisor, before the two shot to stardom with their own projects. Because the film did not exist in previous replays, Jeff suspects that Pamela is also experiencing the same phenomenon. He locates her and asks her questions about future films which only a fellow replayer would know, confirming his suspicions.

Pamela and Jeff eventually fall in love and become convinced that they are soulmates. Complications arise when they notice that their replays are getting shorter and shorter, with Pamela not beginning her next replay until well after Jeff. Eventually, the two decide to try to find other replayers by placing cryptic messages in newspapers. The messages, which seem very vague to anyone who is not a replayer, generate a fair amount of dead-end responses until the pair receives a letter from a man who is clearly knowledgeable about future events. Jeff and Pamela decide to visit the stranger, only to discover that he is confined to a psychiatric hospital. Surprisingly, the staff does not pay attention to his discussion on the future, but it soon becomes clear why the man is institutionalized when he calmly states that he thinks aliens are forcing him to murder people for their own entertainment.

In a later replay, the two decide to take their experiences public, giving press conferences announcing future events in explicit detail. The government eventually takes notice and forces Pamela and Jeff to provide continued updates on foreign activities. Although the government denies responsibility, major political events begin to transpire differently, and Jeff attempts to break off the relationship. The government refuses, and the pair are imprisoned and forced to continue providing information.

As future replays become shorter and shorter, the two are left to wonder how things will eventually unfold—whether or not the replays will ultimately end, and the pair will pass into the afterlife—or if the current replay is, in fact, the last. Eventually, the replays become so short, Jeff and Pamela relive their original deaths repeatedly in succession—until Jeff finally has a heart attack which he manages to survive. While he calls Pamela soon afterward, she lets him know that she has also survived, and that their replaying was not a dream. While it seems ambiguous whether or not they will meet again, Jeff eagerly awaits entering an unpredictable future with endless possibilities.

In the subsequent epilogue, a Norwegian man finds himself waking up in a youthful body in 1988, twenty-nine years before his apparent death in 2017. He marvels at the possibilities that await him at retaining the memories of his life and world and national events for the next quarter century. It becomes apparent to the reader that the replay phenomenon is not limited to the three individuals experiencing it in the novel, nor is it limited to the 1963–1988 timeframe.

== Awards and nominations ==
Replay won the 1988 World Fantasy Award and was on the shortlist for the 1988 Arthur C. Clarke Award.

The novel has been included in several lists of recommended reading: Modern Fantasy: The Hundred Best Novels (1988), Locus Reader's Poll: Best Science Fiction Novel (1988), Aurel Guillemette's The Best in Science Fiction (1993) and David Pringle's Ultimate Guide to Science Fiction (1995).

== Sequel ==
Ken Grimwood was working on a sequel to Replay when he died from a heart attack in 2003 at the age of 59.

== Film adaptation ==
On October 19, 2010, Warner Bros. reported that it was planning on a film version starring Ben Affleck and directing with Jason Smilovic writing the screenplay for this adaptation. On April 29, 2011, Robert Zemeckis was set to direct after Affleck left the project. It was reported later that Greg Berlanti was set to replace Zemeckis as director and will reimagine Jeff Winston as an advertisement executive.

== See also ==
- List of unpublished books by notable authors
