= Ken Grimwood =

American novelist

- Born: Kenneth Milton Grimwood; February 27, 1944; Dothan, Alabama, United States
- Died: June 6, 2003 (aged 59); Santa Barbara, California, United States
- Occupation: Writer
- Writing career
- Notable work: Replay

Kenneth Milton Grimwood (February 27, 1944 – June 6, 2003) was an American author, who also published work under the name of Alan Cochran. In his fantasy fiction, Grimwood combined themes of life-affirmation and hope with metaphysical concepts, themes found in his best-known novel, Replay (1986). It won the 1988 World Fantasy Award for Best Novel.

== Background ==
Grimwood was born in Dothan, Alabama. His family moved to Pensacola, Florida, where he grew up. In his early years, Grimwood took an interest in EC Comics and radio journalism. He attended and graduated in 1961 from Indian Springs School, a private school near Birmingham, Alabama. That summer he went to Paris to study at the Sorbonne. He attended Emory College in Atlanta from 1961 to 1963.

In the mid-1960s, Grimwood worked in news at WLAK in Lakeland, Florida. Heading north, he returned to college, studying psychology at Bard College in Annandale-on-Hudson, New York. He also contributed short fiction to Bard's student publication, Observer in 1969, and graduated in 1970.

Grimwood moved to Los Angeles, California. He wrote some of his early novels while working as nightside editor at KFWB News 980 radio in the city. The success of Replay enabled him to leave that job and pursue writing full-time.

== Personal life ==
Grimwood was married for a period; he and his wife did not have children.

Among his friends was Tom Atwill (a relative of the actor Lionel Atwill). Atwill described Grimwood's "free spirit lifestyle" and recalled,

He was a loner, almost a recluse. He liked small gatherings of friends. We had many dinner parties with him and some friends, and he would always be the one to keep the evening hilarious; he was a great storyteller. He did not like publicity and was actually quite shy... He was a media junkie. He owned the first Betamax sold; he had the largest video library I've ever seen. One of his favorite things to do was for he and I to watch some old movie in the afternoon; we did it often.

== Breakthrough ==
Grimwood's debut novel, Breakthrough (Ballantine, 1976), is a blend of science fiction, reincarnation and horror elements that concluded with an unpredictable twist ending. Cured of epilepsy by a breakthrough in medical technology, 26-year-old Elizabeth Austin has miniature electrodes implanted in her brain. She can control her seizures by pressing an external remote to activate the electrodes. Adjusting to a normal life, she is ready to patch up a troubled marriage and resume her abandoned career. However, as part of the implant operation, Elizabeth gave her consent for the insertion of extra electrodes, featuring experimental functions unknown to science. When one of those electrodes is stimulated, Elizabeth experiences memories which are not her own. She discovers the remote has given her the ability to eavesdrop on her previous life 200 years in the past, and she keeps this a secret from her doctor. Intrigued, she finds the earlier existence appealing and begins to spend more and more time there. Eventually, she discovers that the woman in the past is a murderess who is plotting to kill Elizabeth's husband in the present.

In writing this novel, Grimwood did extensive research into brain surgery and epilepsy.

== Two Plus Two ==
Grimwood used the pseudonym Alan Cochran for his novel Two Plus Two (Doubleday, 1980). The storyline follows two Los Angeles detectives investigating a trio of murders that they learn involve members of a swingers club.

== Replay ==
Grimwood's novel Replay (Arbor House, 1986), explored the life of 43-year-old radio journalist Jeff Winston after his death. He awakens in 1963 in his 18-year-old body. He begins to relive his life with intact memories of the previous 25 years. This happens repeatedly with different events in each cycle.

In this novel, Grimwood refers back and offers a clue to the identity of the author of Two Plus Two: in one passage the main character of Replay hides his identity by using the name "Alan Cochran".

The time-loop concept of Replay has been referred to as a precursor of Harold Ramis's comedy-drama film Groundhog Day (1993), starring Bill Murray.

=== Reception ===
The novel was a bestseller in Japan, and it won the 1988 World Fantasy Award.

The novel was a selection of the Literary Guild and the Doubleday Book Club. In the succeeding years, it has been included in several lists of recommended reading: Modern Fantasy: The 100 Best Novels (1988), Aurel Guillemette's The Best in Science Fiction (1993), David Pringle's Ultimate Guide to Science Fiction (1995) and the Locus Reader's Poll: Best Science Fiction Novel (1988). In the Locus 1998 poll of the best fantasy novels published prior to 1990, Replay placed #32. On the Internet Top 100 SF/Fantasy List, Replay was voted to the #43 position in 2000 but climbed to #19 by 2003.

Critic Daniel D. Shade reviewed the novel in 2001:

Yet in spite of all the pain and anguish we go through as we follow Jeff through his search for an understanding of why he is replaying his life, the book has some important things to say to the reader. First, life is full of endless happenings that we have little control over. We should live our lives with our eyes set upon the horizon and never look back, controlling those things we can and giving no second thought to those events out of our hands. Second, given that we only have one life to live (Jeff is never sure he will replay again with each heart attack) we should live it to the fullest extent possible and with the least regret for our actions. Everybody makes mistakes; the point is not to dwell on them but to pick ourselves up and keep on going. Keep moving ahead. Third, choices must be made—we cannot avoid them. The only failure is to live a life without risks. In fact, I believe Jeff Winston would advise risking everything for those you love and for the life you want for them and with them. To not experience risk is to fail. And what does Replay have to say to a poor, old man like me who is still going through his mid-life crisis? Just this—that every year will be new. Every day a new chance to begin again. There can be no mid-life crisis when we are living each day to the fullest extent possible. From what Jeff Winston has taught me, I would define mid-life crisis as a period of selfishness when we turn inward and think only of ourselves. Jeff inspires us to look outward toward others and think less of ourselves.

In 1986 the agent Irene Webb (then at the William Morris Agency, which still represents Grimwood's work) sold the film rights to Replay to United Artists for a $100,000 option against a $400,000 purchase.

== Into the Deep ==
Grimwood explored his fascination with cetacean intelligence, encounters with dolphins and research into intraspecies dolphin communication for his novel Into the Deep (William Morrow, 1995). It is about a marine biologist struggling to crack the code of dolphin intelligence. It features lengthy passages written from the point of view of several dolphin characters. To research "the willful denial and gratuitous cruelty" involved in tuna fishing, Grimwood secretly infiltrated the crew of a tuna boat based in San Diego, California.

The publisher described the book:

Set on land and beneath the oceans, Into the Deep reveals, once again, Ken Grimwood's exceptional talent for blending fantasy and reality. One part thriller, one part spiritual adventure, the exhilarating story at the heart of Into the Deep involves a hard-hitting journalist, a beautiful scientist, a globe-traveling engineer, and a venerable Portuguese fisherman. Vastly different, their lives are about to intersect and to become irrevocably changed by a school of dolphins--as the fate of the world hangs in the balance. With the drama that unfolds from a silent war waged at the sea's greatest depths and from a single, fateful discovery, Into the Deep takes a tantalizing glimpse at the optimistic future this planet might achieve if humans and the creatures of the deep could learn to share and defend its remarkable bounty.

== Other works ==

Other novels include The Voice Outside (1982), exploring mind control and telepathy-inducing drugs; and Elise (1979). Born in Versailles in 1683, Elise is immortal because of her DNA. The story traces her experiences with various lovers and husbands through the centuries. Elise is now regarded as a rare book and sells at collector prices.

== Death ==
At age 59, Grimwood died of a heart attack at his home in Santa Barbara, California. In this period, he was working on a sequel to Replay. He is included in the Guide to Santa Barbara Authors and Publishers at the University of California, Santa Barbara. There is at least one unpublished Grimwood novel, a collaboration with Tom Atwill.

== See also ==
- List of unpublished books by notable authors
