= Fractured Fables =

Series of fantasy novellas by Alix E. Harrow

- Cover art for A Spindle Splintered, the first novella in the series
- A Spindle Splintered; A Mirror Mended
- Author: Alix E. Harrow
- Country: United States
- Language: English
- Genre: Fantasy
- Publisher: Tor.com
- Published: October 5, 2021 (A Spindle Splintered); June 14, 2022 (A Mirror Mended)
- Media type: Print, ebook, audiobook
- No. of books: 2

Fractured Fables is a series of fantasy novellas written by Alix E. Harrow. The series currently comprises two novellas: A Spindle Splintered (2021) and A Mirror Mended (2022). The series explores fairy tales from a modernist and feminist perspective. Both novellas have received critical acclaim.

== Plot ==
=== A Spindle Splintered ===
Zinnia Gray is a young woman with a terminal illness. Her favorite fairy tale is “Sleeping Beauty”. Her best friend Charm plans a Sleeping Beauty-themed party for Zinnia's 21st birthday, which is expected to be her last. When Zinnia pricks her finger on the spindle, she is transported into another world.

Zinnia meets Princess Primrose, a version of Sleeping Beauty who is cursed to touch a spindle and fall into a century-long slumber. Zinnia stops Primrose from touching a spindle. They decide to confront the fairy who laid the curse on Primrose.

The fairy claims that she cannot remove the spell and that it was intended as a gift. The fairy, Zellandine, was once a maid who suffered from fainting spells. While she was unconscious, she was raped by a prince. Zellandine left her castle and trained in magic so that she could help girls from various fairy tales. Zellandine cursed Primrose because Primrose is a lesbian; Zellandine hoped to save her from an unhappy marriage to Prince Harold, leaving her a better world when she woke up one century later.

Primrose and Zinnia return to the castle. Primrose almost pricks her finger on the spindle, but Harold destroys it. He orders the castle guards to arrest Zinnia and take her to the dungeons. Zinnia realizes that all Sleeping Beauty stories are metaphysically connected. Zinnia uses the power of narrative resonance to bring Charm and three other Sleeping Beauties into Primrose's world. They all rescue Primrose from her wedding to Harold. Zinnia collapses from her illnesses. Primrose kisses her and they are transported back to Zinnia's world.

Zinnia learns that her disease has not been cured, but her adventure seems to have slowed the disease's progress. Charm and Primrose move in together. Zinnia decides to use her remaining lifespan to travel through fairy tale worlds, hoping to find a cure for herself and to save other girls trapped in unhappy stories. She pricks her finger on a splinter from the shattered spindle and smiles.

=== A Mirror Mended ===
Zinnia has saved more than forty Sleeping Beauties and is starting to feel tired of the repetition. She sees the Evil Queen in a bathroom mirror and travels to her dimension.

The queen wants to leave her world and find a better ending. She and Zinnia use the magic mirror to travel through several versions of Snow White's story. They meet Zellandine. The borders between different fairy tales seem to be weakening; Zellandine thinks this is a result of Zinnia meddling in the multiverse.

A young girl named Red is kidnapped by huntsmen. Zinnia and Eva (short for “Evil Queen”) attempt to rescue her. They save the girl, but are captured by an evil version of Snow White. Zinnia escapes through the mirror, which shatters during the fight. Eva stays behind; she and Red defeat the evil Snow White.

Zinnia returns to Earth and speaks to Charm and Prim. She apologizes for being a bad friend. Zinnia uses a piece of the shattered mirror to return to Eva. They write a new story, hoping to break out of the roles that are assigned to them. Zinnia returns to Earth and promises to stop running from her own story.

== Major themes ==
Writing for Locus, Gary K. Wolfe stated that the first two Fractured Fables novellas were examples of "bibliofantasy". He defines "bibliofantasy" as "a certain kind of recursive fantasy, in which protagonists find themselves transported into classic stories or story-worlds." Wolfe finds that this allows for the story to have two perspectives. Zinnia is both a character within the story, and she uses her background in folklore to examine the story critically. The Evil Queen complains about not having a name, and about the tragic ending to her own story. Over the course of A Mirror Mended, Zinnia is able to explain the concepts of "agency" and "protagonist" to the Evil Queen; she then "evolves from archetype to character in the story's most important narrative arc".

== Style ==
A Spindle Splintered utilizes classic paper-cut illustrations by Arthur Rackham, taken from a 1920 retelling of Sleeping Beauty. According to a review from Tor.com, these illustrations are cleverly "splintered". Sometimes the figures appear without heads; sometimes the heads are swapped "between hunters and prey, princes and princesses". According to the review, this suggests a desire to reject archetypes and define new roles.

== Reception ==
Book 1

A review in Culturess praised the re-imagination of the Sleepy Beauty story in A Spindle Splintered, noting that Harrow "[gives] the women at its center the agency the original so often robs its heroine of." A review in NPR praised Zinnia's tone, finding that her "genre savvy... never crosses the line into irritating" and "the tropes never become twee or rote". The same review praised the inclusion of hard science into the story, finding that it "helps ground Zinnia's adventure in our reality." A review for Tor.com praised the friendship between Zinnia and Charm, calling their bond "the most magical aspect of the series". The same review found that Zinna's and Prim's adventure revealed "a keenly sharp commentary that feels both timeless and very much rooted in current conversations about childbearing people’s bodily autonomy."

Writing for Locus, Gary K. Wolfe praised Harrow's "fancy narrative footwork" and called it "a subversive delight". Wolfe also stated that opening the story on Zinnia's 21st birthday when she is expected to die before the age of 22 "feels like a pretty arbitrary setup for a tale which is largely critical of the arbitrary rules of fairy tales". Publishers Weekly called the concept "delightful" and praised the romance between Charm and Primrose. At the same time, the review criticized the dialogue and felt that too much time was spent on memes and pop culture references at the expense of secondary character development.

Book 2

A review for Kirkus praised the chemistry between Zinnia and Eva as well as Zinnia's dialogue, calling the novel "lively" and "engaging". Martin Cahill wrote that Harrow "hits her stride" when exploring the relationship between Eva and Zinnia. Gary K. Wolfe praised Zinnia's character as "wonderfully unique" and felt that her deconstruction of her own story was "skillful". A review in Paste praised Harrow's ability to use folklore and anthropology to "illuminate the many uncomfortable, patriarchal, and even downright creepy aspects of traditional fairytales".

Publishers Weekly wrote that A Mirror Mended would provide plenty to hold the attention of series fans and lovers of fractured fairy tales, but that the barrage of pop culture references might be overwhelming to some readers.

== Awards ==
Year	Nominee	Award	Category	Result	Ref
2022	A Spindle Splintered	British Fantasy Award	Novella	Shortlisted	
2022	A Spindle Splintered	Hugo Award	Novella	Finalist	
2022	A Spindle Splintered	Locus Award	Novella	Finalist	
2023	A Mirror Mended	Hugo Award	Novella	Finalist	
2023	A Mirror Mended	Locus Award	Novella	Finalist	
2023	A Mirror Mended	Southern Book Prize	Fiction	Finalist	
