= The Ghost Bride (TV series) =

Malaysian-Taiwanese TV series

- Promotional poster of the series
- Chinese: 彼岸之嫁
- Literal meaning: Marriage to the Afterlife
- Hanyu Pinyin: Bǐ'àn Zhī Jià
- Jyutping: bei2 ngon6 zi1 gaa3
- Hokkien POJ: pí gān chi kè
- Genre: Period drama; Fantasy; Supernatural horror
- Created by: Kai-yu Wu
- Based on: The Ghost Bride by Yangsze Choo
- Developed by: Anwari Ashraf; Yasmin Yaacob
- Starring: Huang Pei-jia; Wu Kang-jen; Ludi Lin; Kuang Tian
- Composer: Paul Morrison
- Countries of origin: Taiwan; Malaysia
- Original languages: Mandarin; Malay; Cantonese
- No. of seasons: 1
- No. of episodes: 6

Production
- Executive producer: Zainir Aminullah
- Producers: Anne Low; Jasok Kok; Kai-yu Wu (consulting)
- Production location: Malaysia
- Cinematography: Eric Yeong
- Editors: Natalie Soh; Mun Thye Soo
- Running time: 60 minutes
- Production company: Revolution Media

Original release
- Network: Netflix
- Release: 23 January 2020

The Ghost Bride (Chinese: 彼岸之嫁) is a 2020 Taiwanese-Malaysian Netflix original series created by Kai-yu Wu and co-directed by Malaysian directors Quek Shio-chuan and Ho Yu-hang. It is based on the novel The Ghost Bride written by Malaysian writer Yangsze Choo, and stars Huang Pei-jia, Wu Kang-jen, Ludi Lin, and Kuang Tian.

== Synopsis ==
In 1890s Colonial Malacca, Li-lans father thinks of a marriage proposal from a wealthy family to be the "ghost bride" to their deceased son - an opportunity that would save her family from a lifetime of debt, but require her to spend the rest of her days haunted by a ghostly spouse. Desperate to escape the situation, she soon finds herself wrapped up in a murder mystery and embroiled in otherworldly affairs far bigger than she could have imagined.

== Cast ==
=== Main ===
- Huang Pei-jia as Pan Li-lan, the ghost bride
- Wu Kang-ren as Er-lang, a 500-year-old deity
- Ludi Lin as Lim Tian-bai, Li-lan's childhood friend
- Kuang Tian as Lim Tian-ching, the Lims' deceased son whom Li-lan marries

=== Recurring ===
- Janet Hsieh as Hsiao-yu, Li-lan's deceased mother
- Susan Leong as Amah, the Pan family housekeeper
- Jordan Voon as Mr. Pan, Li-lan's father
- Wilson Tin as Old Wong, the Pan family's chef who can talk to ghosts
- Angeline Tan as Madam Lim, Tian-ching's mother
- Jojo Goh as Lim Yan-hong, Tian-ching's older half-sister
- Teresa Daley as Isabel, Tian-bai's betrothed
- Meeki Ng as Yu-li, Li-lan's friend
- Bailey Oh as Amah,the Pan family's maid.

== Episodes ==
=== Season 1 (2020) ===
No.	Title	Directed by	Written by	Original release date
1	"Chapter 1"	Quek Shio-chuan	Kai-yu Wu	January 23, 2020
Mr. Pan was alarmed by a marriage proposal made by the wealthy and respected Lim family during celebration for the deceased eldest son (Tian-ching) of the family, Pan Li-lan is torn on this proposal as it would solve her family's financial struggle, but would mean she would give up on her childhood love Tian-bai and be a "ghost bride" and be haunted by their deceased spouse. Pan Li-lan has weird dreams after her visit to the Lim's Mansion, as she soon realizes it is Tian-ching that is haunting her sleep. Pan Li-lan's father goes for a 3-day business trip to source spices for his failing business but is returned to the family after he falls ill. Tian-ching reveals himself in Pan Li-lan's dream and reveals that he was murdered, and wishes to have Pan Li-lan as his bride. The two strike a deal- he will help Pan Li-lan's father whose soul is stuck in the netherworld if Pan Li-lan can figure out who is his murderer. Tian-bai is the primary suspect as he will be the family heir following Tian-ching's death.
2	"Chapter 2"	Quek Shio-chuan	Yasmin Yaacob	January 23, 2020
Pan Li-lan uses a ruse that she lost an earring at the celebration to investigate the Lim household. She meets Er-lang who reveals himself as an immortal heavenly guard sent to investigate why Tian-ching has not reported in following his death as he suspects Tian-ching bribed the gate guards to let him wander. Pan Li-lan is found to be sneaking around following an argument with Er-lang in Tian-bai's room and is sent home, where she is confronted later by Tian-bai who is hurt that Pan Li-lan considers him the culprit, he affirms her that he is not guilty, and also reveals that he is engaged to Isabel, a woman he had met while studying in Hong Kong. Pan Li-lan's amah (literally: grandmother; a "friend" that helps raise Pan Li-lan) enrages Tian-bai with a minor curse, and he returns to enact revenge against her causing a bruise on her arm.
3	"Chapter 3"	Quek Shio-chuan	Yasmin Yaacob & Yi-fen Tsai	January 23, 2020
Pan Li-lan's time is running out and she is eager to find the answer to complete her end of the bargain. Er-lang finds out that the Lim family had recently fired a servant that was close to Tian-Ching named Fang. Pan Li-lan is able to find out the same. Tian-bai and Pan Li-lan head on a trip to seek answers from her, where they meet Er-lang on the way. It is revealed that Fang bears Tian-ching's child, and has been sending her child support. Fang reveals she was fired by Tian Ching because she was in love with him and stalked him. Fang also reveals that he saw Tian-ching with a woman with gold bracelets. Pan Li-lan shares news of this woman with both Er-Lang and Tian-bai, in which they all suspect the woman to be Yan-hong. Pan Li-lan's amah is still haunted by Tian-ching, as her bruise grows larger. She attempts to protect her home from Tian-ching's spirit, but as she does his spirit acts up and injures the Pan family cook Old Wong. When Pan Li-lan returns home, she sees Old Wong's injuries and her grandma comes clean regarding the recent hauntings. Old Wong also reveals that since an incident where he lost his friend as a child, he sees ghosts and talks to ghosts. Later that evening, Mr. Pan has a nose bleed and he appears to be taking a turn for the worse, this pressures Pan Li-lan to seek out Yan-hong. Pan Li-lan and Er-lang find Yan-hong at the gambling den but she noticed them and attempts to run. Er-lang fights off the guards at the den, while Pan Li-lan gives chase, but is knocked unconscious by Yan-hong which is then scared off by a homeless man. Pan Li-lan's soul wakes up in the realm of the dead and sees Tian-ching and the spirit of her nearly dead father. She begs for Tian-ching to return her dad's soul to his living body so that he can survive, he states he will only help her if she agrees to be his bride. Mr. Pan wakes up just as Er-lang brings Pan Li-lan's body back home.
4	"Chapter 4"	Ho Yu-hang	Yasmin Yaacob & June Tan	January 23, 2020
Tian-bai, Mr. Pan, and Er-lang look for ways to bring Pan Li-lan back from the Netherworld. Tian-bai and Mr. Pan attempt to discover how she fell into the coma, while Er-lang meets with The General to request permission to go to the Netherworld and investigate Tian-ching. The General agrees, but warns him he will be powerless in that realm, and provides Er-lang with a sword. Pan Li-lan faces difficulty adjusting to the Netherworld, where she has servants that follow her and report back to Tian-ching. Tian-ching explains how the Netherworld works, and shows her how all ghosts must receive judgement to go to here or be reincarnated, but he has managed to avoid it because of his "connections". Tian-ching shows Pan Li-lan the riches he has received through his mother's offerings, and Pan Li-lan notices a set of red books in a red chest. The books are blank, and when she looks through them, Tian-ching takes them away from her. Pan Li-lan and Er-lang find each other in the Netherworld, and they search Tian-ching's home for the red books. They find them, but they are guarded and eventually collected by one of Tian-ching's servants, but Pan Li-lan manages to steal one of the books before they're taken. Remembering that Tian-ching was nervous when she put her glass on the books, Pan Li-lan submerges the book in a fountain, where it turns into a valuable black pearl. Er-lang realizes this is the payment Tian-ching makes to avoid being judged in the afterlife. Pan Li-lan hears her name called by Mr. Wong. He appears to her as an apparition to warn her about a portal that will open to let her back to her body in the real world. Pan Li-lan and Er-lang race to the portal, but are attacked by ghosts. Pan Li-lan gives up her chance to escape to help Er-lang. They return to Tian-ching's home, and in the distance an unknown figure recognizes Pan Li-lan.
5	"Chapter 5"	Ho Yu-hang	Dan Hamamura	January 23, 2020
Tian-ching is punished by the judge he has been bribing for having a short payment, which Er-lang witnesses. Tian-ching's mother provides him with more offerings, including more red books. Pan Li-lan's mother breaks into the house and reveals herself to Pan Li-lan as the distant figure from the previous episode. Pan Li-lan's mother chose to wait for Pan Li-lan and Mr. Pan instead of being judged and reincarnated. Tian-bai stops Madam Lim from making any further offerings. They fight, and Yan-hong convinces Tian-bai to allow her to continue burning offerings as a process of her grief. Tian-bai discovers arsenic belonging to one of the servants, Fu Mei, and has her arrested for poisoning Tian-ching and Pan Li-lan. Mr. Pan confronts Madam Lim for pressuring Pan Li-lan into becoming Tian-ching's ghost bride. Mr. Wong dies in his sleep. Er-lang discovers the identity of the judge Tian-ching has been bribing, but is caught in the process. When Pan Li-lan tries to help him escape, her betrayal is discovered.
6	"Chapter 6"	Ho Yu-hang	Kai-yu Wu	January 23, 2020
Mrs. Pan disguises herself and steals leftovers from the party to attract hungry ghosts. The ghosts interrupt the party and attack the attendees. Mrs. Pan uses the opportunity to help Pan Li-lan and Er-lang escape. Er-lang summons Heavenly Guards to arrest the ghosts and judges that attempted to escape the system. Isabel, Mr. Pan, and Tian-bai meet for tea and during the conversation, Isabel accidentally reveals that she is aware of details like the shirtless man near where Li-Lan was attacked at the gambling den. Mr. Pan and Tian-bai realize she's the one who attacked Pan Li-lan, not the servant. Isabel had attempted to stop her from finding out the truth of Tian-ching's death, including that she was the murderer. She killed him because he had threatened to reveal that she had cheated on Tian-bai with Tian-ching. Isabel is arrested. Er-lang is promoted, but the General refuses to make an exception for Pan Li-lan and return her to the land of the living. Mrs. Pan is reincarnated. Pan Li-lan succumbs to the poison of living between life and death, but at the last moment, she awakens in the land of the living. Madam Lim runs into the Pan family, and Pan Li-lan reveals to her that Tian-ching was taken to judgement. Tian-bai asks Pan Li-lan to marry him, and she agrees. Madam Lim and Yan-hong remind Pan Li-lan of the social duties she will be required to take on. Pan Li-lan realizes that she and Tian-bai will both be sacrificing their dreams by settling down. Pan Li-lan accidentally summons Er-lang, and she realizes Er-lang is still fighting demons and ghosts, and he reveals he sacrificed his promotion to send her back to her life. After speaking with her father, she realizes she and Er-lang have fallen in love, she still wants to travel the world, and she cannot marry Tian-bai. She encourages Tian-bai to become a doctor, her father to let go of his guilt, and she leaves to join Er-lang on his missions and investigations. Just as they begin to leave, Er-lang rolls up his sleeve to check the poison marks spreading on his arm, indicating he is living between life and death.
