= Brooke Stevens =

American novelist

Brooke Stevens is an American novelist. His first novel, The Circus of the Earth and the Air, was a nominee for the Barnes & Noble Discover Great New Writers Award in 1994 and a finalist for the World Fantasy Award in 1995. He has published two subsequent novels, not works of fantasy, and has taught creative writing at Sarah Lawrence College. His work has been translated into French, German and Japanese and it has also been published in the UK. He lives in Kent, Connecticut.

== Bibliography ==
- The Circus of the Earth and the Air, New York: Harcourt Brace, 1994, ISBN 0-15-117987-5
  - Die Insel der Wahrheit, Aufbau-Verlag, 1996 (German edition)
  - Circus, Éditions Autrement, 2008. (French edition)
- Tattoo Girl, New York: St. Martin's Press, 2001, ISBN 978-0-312-26910-4
  - Tattoo Girl, Éditions Autrement, 2003 (French edition)
  - Der Wassermann, Bastei Lübbe, 2003 (German edition)
  - Tattoo Girl, Piatkus Books, 2002 (British edition)
  - Tattoo Girl, Kondansha, 2003 (Japanese edition)
- Kissing Your Ex, New York: Penguin USA, 2004, ISBN 978-0-451-21202-3
