= The Ten Thousand Doors of January =

2019 novel by Alix E. Harrow

- First edition
- Author: Alix E. Harrow
- Language: English
- Genre: Fantasy
- Publisher: Redhook Books
- Publication date: September 10, 2019
- Publication place: United States
- ISBN: 978-0-316-42199-7

The Ten Thousand Doors of January is a 2019 fantasy novel by Alix E. Harrow. It is the Hugo Award-nominated writer's debut novel.

== Plot synopsis ==
At the beginning of the 20th century, January Scaller lives in a big mansion with her guardian, Cornelius Locke. What may seem to be a privileged existence is marred by the strict rules imposed on the dark-skinned girl, the meager living quarters assigned to her, and the fact that her father, Julian, who works hunting special artifacts for Locke, is almost never around.

When she was seven, January discovered a magic door, which was then destroyed. Her guardian convinces her it was only her imagination, and determines to raise her to be a "proper" lady. Locke entertains his fellows from the New England Archeological Society, and these men treat January as a curiosity, sometimes making her feel vaguely threatened. January often explores the artifacts kept throughout the mansion, and concludes that Locke is leaving items for her in a chest, as gifts. She becomes concerned when her father fails to return from his most recent trip.

January's only companions are Jane, an African mystery woman sent by Julian to be her companion and protector, and Bad, her loyal dog. When she was younger, she was friends with Samuel Zappia, the grocer's boy, but as she grew older, their contact fizzled out.

When January finds a special book in the chest, The Ten Thousand Doors, she is more than intrigued. The book tells of Ade, a young woman from the South, who meets a young man who comes through a mysterious door. Though the encounter is brief, the girl is completely enamored. When she returns to the spot again, she finds the door burnt down. She becomes determined to find her young man by exploring the world to find another door.

At the start, January believes the work is fiction. But when Locke tells her that Julian is dead, she sparks her latent power to bend reality to her will through the written word. She uses her power to escape what has now become an acutely dangerous situation with Locke and his cohort, and embarks on an entirely unexpected adventure with Jane, Samuel and Bad. It turns out that her story and the story in her book are intertwined, and that the thousands of doors are real, scattered all over our world, each connecting to another world.

Julian, as it turns out, is the author of The Ten Thousand Doors, as well as the mysterious boy Ade met in her youth. Ade discovered a way to travel to Julian's world, where he was a young scholar. They married, and Ade gave birth to January. When the trio attempted to return to Ade's world to visit her family, they became separated, with Ade staying behind. Locke had the door secretly destroyed and hired Julian to find doors to collect artifacts for his collection. Julian agreed, hoping to discover a door that would enable him to return to Ade with their daughter. January eventually destroys Locke and reunites with her parents in her father's world.

== Reception ==
The Ten Thousand Doors of January was a Los Angeles Times best seller.

In her NPR review, Jessica P. Wick enthuses that you will "want to open every one of 'The Ten Thousand Doors of January'", calling the novel both bewitching and satisfying. She lauds how Harrow "explores privilege and race, class and power, control, imperialism, the desire for order, the desire for hope, community, home, what it is to be an exile, what it is to be afraid," adding that "stories provide strength and escape in The Ten Thousand Doors of January, but Harrow doesn't neglect to show us how the stories we're told can trap us, too. For a novel so grand in scope, it manages to stay intimate."

Kirkus Reviews called The Ten Thousand Doors of January "a love letter to imagination, adventure, the written word, and the power of many kinds of love." The review compliments the diverse cast of characters as well as the strong woman lead, noting that "this portal fantasy doesn't shy away from racism, classism, and sexism, which helps it succeed as an interesting story."

== Awards and nominations ==
Year	Award	Category	Result	Ref
2019	Goodreads Choice Award	Debut Novel	Nominated—4th	
2019	Goodreads Choice Award	Fantasy Novel	Nominated—11th	
2019	Nebula Award	Novel	Shortlisted	
2020	Audie Award n. January LaVoy	Fantasy	Won	
2020	Audie Award n. January LaVoy	Female Narration	Shortlisted	
2020	British Fantasy Award	Fantasy Novel	Shortlisted	
2020	British Fantasy Award	Newcomer (Sydney J. Bounds Award)	Shortlisted	
2020	Compton Crook Award	—	Shortlisted	
2020	Crawford Award	—	Shortlisted	
2020	Dragon Awards	Science Fiction Novel	Shortlisted	
2020	Hugo Award	Novel	Shortlisted	
2020	Kitschies	Golden Tentacle (Debut)	Shortlisted	
2020	Locus Award	First Novel	Nominated—3rd	
2020	Mythopoeic Awards	Fantasy	Shortlisted	
2020	World Fantasy Award	Novel	Shortlisted	

- BookNest Award for Best Debut Novel (2019) – Nominee (Shortlisted)
