= The Mere Wife =

Book by Maria Dahvana Headley

- Book cover of the first edition, published in 2018, designed by Miranda Meeks.
- Author: Maria Dahvana Headley
- Language: English
- Genre: Dystopian
- Publisher: Farrar, Straus and Giroux
- Publication date: July 17, 2018
- Publication place: United States
- Media type: Novel
- Pages: 308
- ISBN: 9780374208431 (1st ed hardcover)
- OCLC: 1019836460
- Dewey Decimal: 813/.6
- LC Class: PS3608.E233 M47 2018

The Mere Wife is a book by Maria Dahvana Headley that is a retelling of Beowulf set in 21st-century America.

== Plot ==
Dana Mills wakes up unsure of what has happened to her or why she is pregnant. She knows she is a member of the marines. She is interrogated and ends up in a mental hospital from which she escapes. She ends up near Herot Hall, a development built on top of the town where she used to live. She hides inside the mountain behind it, which has an abandoned train station and a lake; people think it is haunted. In it she gives birth to her son, Gren.

Despite his mother's instructions, as Gren grows older he wishes to meet the people in Herot and becomes friends with Dylan, a young boy in the town. Willa, Dylan's mother, is introduced. Her mother, Diane, forced her into a marriage with Roger Herot, a plastic surgeon and heir of the Herot development. She acts as the perfect housewife (hiding alcoholism, a likely eating disorder, an unhappy marriage, and copious quantities of stress) and quickly notices something is amiss when Dylan begins to talk about his "imaginary" friend Gren. At a disastrous house party Dana appears searching for her son who has run down to play with Dylan. Dylan runs away with Gren as Roger follows them toward the mountain. Roger shoots a bear, thinking it is what took Dylan, but Dana believes that he has shot Gren, and so she murders Roger in retaliation. Following this, police officer Ben Woolf goes searching for Dylan. He finds Dylan, and Dana's severed arm, but he claims he killed Dana and Gren. He is acclaimed as a hero and Willa marries Ben.

Years later, Dylan runs away from the boarding school he has been placed in due to rebellious behaviors to find Gren. Dana, who has been slipping further from reality, argues that the people of Herot are evil – they dug into the mountain and disturbed a graveyard where her mother was buried, turning it into a railway station and creating a museum full of her family's bones and belongings. Gren argues that Dylan was good and finally leaves, going to look for him. They meet and kiss but are found by Ben and, running back to his childhood home, Dylan is brutally stabbed and murdered by Willa. Gren vows for revenge and reconciles with Dana; together they attack Ben at Dylan's funeral. Gren is killed by Ben; everyone realizes he is a boy, not a monster. Dana kills Ben, committing suicide in the process. As Willa is put in handcuffs, she realizes all the people of Herot Hall are monsters.

== Structure and techniques ==
Each of the sections begins with a possible translation of "Hwaet", the word that begins Beowulf. The sections are told from different perspectives: Dana narrates in first person, Willa and Ben in third, and the ancestors living in the mountain, mothers of Herot, and dogs in first person plural.

== Themes ==
Headley makes many references to modern police violence (especially against African Americans), social media usage, class differences, and feminine stereotypes.

== Response ==
The New York Times claimed Headley brought Beowulf into the 21st century "in a curious way". The Guardian noted, "The question in Headley's ambitious novel is why we need to cast anyone as a monster at all." The Mere Wife was nominated for the 2019 World Fantasy Award for Best Novel.
