= The Bog Wife =

2024 novel by Kay Chronister

- Author: Kay Chronister
- Series: English
- Genre: Horror; Southern Gothic
- Set in: West Virginia
- Published: 1 Oct 2024
- Publisher: Counterpoint
- Publication place: United States
- Pages: 317 (hardcover)
- ISBN: 9781640096622

The Bog Wife is a 2024 horror novel by Kay Chronister that incorporates elements of Southern Gothic literature. It tells the story of the Haddesley family, in which family members sacrifice their family patriarch to a bog in order receive a wife in return. The story has received praise for its exploration of patriarchal family dynamics and traditions.

== Plot ==
The Haddesley family lives in a crumbling manor and has tended a bog for generations. Each generation, the family sacrifices their patriarch to the bog. In exchange, the bog produces a “bog-wife” who is brought to life to continue the family lineage.

The patriarch Charles Haddesley XI has five adult children: Eda, Charlie, Wenna, Percy, and Nora. Their mother, the previous bog-wife, disappeared years earlier. The elder Charles is dying. Wenna, who is estranged from the family, returns to attend the burial rite with her siblings. Charlie’s pelvis was crushed when a tree fell on it, leaving him infertile and unable to continue the family line. The children bury their father in the bog. The next morning, the bog does not produce a bog-wife for Charlie.

As months pass, the five Haddesly children become increasingly unmoored. Percy finds a written diary entry which explains how to create a new wife from nothing. He buries a skeleton made of sticks and moss, which will supposedly become a bog-wife after one hundred days. He resolves to live outside until his bog-wife emerges. Wenna approaches a local realtor about selling the manor. Eda resolves to become pregnant, breaking a centuries-long taboo which prevented Haddesly women from bearing children. She has sex with a stranger from a local bar. Nora intercepts a letter from Wenna’s estranged husband Michael, revealing that Wenna had gotten married without informing any of her family members.

Charlie retrieves the deed to the house and notes its date of 1897, which contradicts the oral family history. At the local library, he learns that much of the Haddesly family history is fictionalized. The home was built by the reclusive son of a robber baron, who invented the Haddesley name and legend.

Eda announces her pregnancy. Wenna accuses Eda of ruining their “clean break” from the past. Wenna almost leaves but is trapped by a winter storm. The manor’s second floor collapses. As the storm ends, Percy sees a woman emerging from the bog. Although he had expected a new bog-wife, this woman is his mother.

Their mother tells the children that the bog has been dying for decades and that she will soon lose her ability to speak. She encourages her children to abandon their rituals and seek out “new compacts”. Their mother slowly becomes more plantlike and vegetal, rejoining the bog and its ecosystem. Percy and Nora gain the ability to sense the local ecosystem and plan to join their mother. Charlie, unable to sense this, leaves the bog and drives away to start an independent life. Percy, Nora, and their mother turn into trees. Eda and Wenna choose to remain human and continue to live on their family’s land. Eda gives birth to a baby girl, who is named after no one else in the family.

== Major themes ==
=== Relationship to Gothic literature ===
Fiona Denton of Grimdark Magazine categorizes the novel as a part of the subgenre of "Appalachian gothic folklore". Ian Mond of Locus also describes portions of the work as Southern gothic, writing that The Bog Wife includes characteristics such as "a large, brooding house, ancient rituals, [and] family secrets". Nevertheless, "it also has a compassion for its characters that belies, even subverts, the conventional gothic tropes." Mond writes that Chronister made subtle changes which subvert the subgenre, particularly in the character of Wenna. Wenna is both a "damsel in distress", a typical Gothic trope, as well as an agent of change who "empowers her siblings ... to reflect and question their submerged identities."

Mond further notes that Gothic literature is "well known for its exaggerated, grotesque characters", a recent example of which includes Mexican Gothic by Silvia Moreno-Garcia. He contrasts the typical Gothic novel with Chronister's approach as follows:

You can imagine an alternate novel where Wenna’s ex-husband, desperate to have his wife back, arrives unannounced at the Haddesley house, only to be dealt with by the siblings. But Chronister treats her characters with tenderness. This doesn’t make the novel any less disquieting. Awareness that your life was based on a lie, that you’ve suppressed decades of trauma, that you never needed to feel this lonely, this afraid, this unloved, is still upsetting. But rather than view the siblings, including Wenna, as just victims, we view them as individuals, each, in their unique way, striving to make sense of what’s become of their lives.

Jake Casella Brookins of Locus writes that the novel "openly questions its supernatural elements almost from the jump." There is no proof of the existence of the supernatural in the early sections of the novel; "Chronister seems to be playing with the reader’s desire to believe the fantasy, against all evidence, even as the Haddesleys do." Casella Brookins writes that this "uneasy relationship with the supernatural" and the "studies of involuted family psychology" recall the works of Shirley Jackson, particularly The Haunting of Hill House and We Have Always Lived in the Castle.

=== Family systems ===
Ben Lewellyn-Taylor of the Chicago Review of Books writes that the novel "examines the varying responses within a family system to upended convictions and the ties that bind and break if they cannot bend." According to Lewellyn-Taylor, "Chronister uses each sibling’s perspective to reveal how a family can crumble under the mythology it holds dear... The Bog Wife highlights the dangers of deceiving ourselves through old myths that appear “noble” because they seem “ancient”."

Jake Casella Brookins notes that the novel is composed of "insiders only. There’s no one beyond the tiny Haddesley cult to see and be horrified, no outside investigator to purge or rescue them – at times I couldn’t help thinking of The Bog Wife as an X-Files episode in which Scully and Mulder never show up." This perspective allows the author to interrogate, in an intentionally incomplete form, the abusive patriarchal traditions of the Haddesley family. Casella Brookins notes that the family members sacrifice their patriarch to the bog, but wonders how the "scales balance" in terms of the compact. "Chronister seems to be targeting is the essential emptiness of patriarchal and cultural chauvinism: We give up a lot for them, and don’t get much back."

Georgia Smith of Starburst writes that the novel explores the way in which women are treated in antisocial families, stating that "the novel questions the demands that tradition, expectation, and gendered roles make of women, and the choicelessness that often rears its head in horror and yet is rarely questioned down to its core."

=== Land and the environment ===
Ben Lewellyn-Taylor wrote that the novel reveals fears about ecological extinction; the death of the bog forces the family members to change if they wish to survive in the future. Jeffrey Condran of the Pittsburgh Post-Gazette opined that "Few things can be as powerful as our reverence for land. To whom does land belong, how and why, is often a sacred value that people are willing to enact violence to defend." Condran states that land is often passed down from father to eldest son in a patriarchal inheritance pattern, "a practice often fraught with high emotional tension". This concept is particularly explored in the character of Charlie, who "does not have the aggressive confidence of his father, nor his passion for keeping the Haddesley line intact."

Georgia Smith wrote that the relationship between the Haddesleys and the bog is "a co-dependent set of demands ensuring one cannot function without the other." The Haddesleys have an "older, more symbiotic way of living" and are "so unsocialised as to be barely a step away from wild creatures themselves." Smith also compares the women of the novel to the Earth itself, stating that the bog-wife is "pulled from the earth, forced to bear human children and endure the abuses and indignities of violent men..."

== Reception ==
Fiona Denton of Grimdark Magazine called the novel "unsettling but engaging", comparing it to a documentary about cults. Denton writes that the Haddesley siblings are well-developed characters, although their neglectful upbringing makes them all act younger than their chronological ages.

A review in the Pittsburgh Post-Gazette stated that "Chronister is a dynamic writer who has married a family chronicle to literary horror ... [She has] perfected the idea of place as character." A review in Kirkus stated that "the setting is unique, the language evocative, and the characters well-drawn... Chronister effectively straddles fantasy and reality while exploring themes of stewardship and ties to the earth."

Publishers Weekly wrote that "Chronister creates a claustrophobic portrait of ecological devastation and dire poverty in this grim Appalachian gothic." The review catalogued the motivations and reactions of the Haddesley siblings, concluding that "these disparate reactions build to an abrupt and unsatisfying ending that leaves toxic cycles intact and the family to stew in their misfortune. Even diehard fans of gothic horror will need a high tolerance for misery to get through this."

Kiersten White of the New York Times stated that "the five siblings are the greatest strength of the narrative" and "the book is at its best when it's exploring the tension between what the siblings want and need from one another, while also delving into the extensive damage their father and his ideas did to them." White criticized the mystery of the mother's disappearance, as Chronister "[frustrates] the reader by constantly alluding to the question of what happened to her ... the answer leads to a final twist that undermines everything that came before." White concludes that the novel "will doubtless generate lively discussion in book club setting, even if [the resolution] feels a bit too easy."

Georgia Smith of Starburst gave the novel four stars out of five, calling it "a visceral, bodily-focused novel with such rich writing style that a reader can almost smell the Haddesley land".

Awards and Honors
| Year | Award | Result | Ref. |
|---|---|---|---|
| 2025 | World Fantasy Award for Best Novel | Pending | |
