= The Night Tiger =

2019 Yangsze Choo novel

- First edition cover
- Author: Yangsze Choo
- Audio read by: Yangsze Choo
- Language: English
- Genre: Novel, historical fiction, magical realism
- Set in: Perak, British Malaya, 1931
- Publisher: Flatiron Books
- Publication date: 2019
- Publication place: United States
- Media type: Print: hardback
- Pages: 352
- ISBN: 9781250175458
- OCLC: 1031551009
- Dewey Decimal: 823.92
- LC Class: PS3603.H664 N54
- Preceded by: The Ghost Bride

The Night Tiger: A Novel is a 2019 novel by Malaysian author Yangsze Choo, written in English.

Choo took almost four years to write the book, including visiting the setting of the novel to ensure historical accuracy.

Settings of The Night Tiger within Malaya

In 2022, The Night Tiger was included on the Big Jubilee Read, a list of 70 books by Commonwealth authors produced to celebrate Queen Elizabeth II's Platinum Jubilee.

== Plot ==
In 1931, in British Malaya, Ji Lin works as an apprentice dressmaker and dancehall girl. One of her dance partners leaves her with a human finger.

Houseboy Ren is trying to fulfil his former master’s dying wish: to find his lost finger within 49 days.

Meanwhile, unexplained deaths take place across the area, and there are rumours of the harimau jadian, a tiger that can transform into a human.

== Reception ==
The Washington Independent Review of Books' Patricia Schultheis called The Night Tiger "a galloping good read that’s blessedly free of political polemics and post-colonial self-righteousness." In Locus magazine, it was called "an immersive ride into the past […] a slow burn of a novel that hints early and often at regional myths and legends. There is much more at work here, including the tender sorrow of Ren’s childhood and the violence that has long threatened Ji Lin." Writing in The Harvard Crimson, Kelsey Chen said that, in The Night Tiger, "The world of colonial Malaysia is a pulsing, dynamic land. […] filled with exponentially heightened colors, dreams, and emotions in a quivering, hallucinatory mystery where local and diasporic mythologies come to life. […] a world hopelessly entangled in threads of fate and death, ordered along rules of ritual and folklore."

The audiobook of the novel, narrated by Choo herself, was nominated for the 2020 Audie Award for Literary Fiction or Classics.

In 2022, The Night Tiger was included on the Big Jubilee Read, a list of 70 books by Commonwealth authors produced to celebrate Queen Elizabeth II's Platinum Jubilee.
