= The Once and Future Witches =

2020 novel by Alix E. Harrow

- First edition cover
- Author: Alix E. Harrow
- Audio read by: Gabra Zackman
- Cover artist: Lisa Marie Pompilio
- Language: English
- Genre: Fantasy
- Publisher: Redhook Books
- Publication date: October 13, 2020
- Publication place: United States
- Media type: Print (hardcover & paperback), ebook, audiobook
- Pages: 517 pp. (hardcover)
- Award: BFA—Fantasy (2021)
- ISBN: 9780316422048 (hardcover 1st ed.)
- OCLC: 1143799962
- Dewey Decimal: 813/.6
- LC Class: PS3608.A783854 O53 2020

The Once and Future Witches is a 2020 fantasy novel by American writer Alix E. Harrow, the second novel released by Harrow.

== Summary ==
In New Salem, United States, in 1893, the three Eastwood sisters join the suffragist movement. After one of them accidentally performs a spell and the three begin advocating for witching rights as well as the right to vote, they are kicked out of the movement and form their own activist group to reclaim women's rights and the power of magic. Harrow has described the book as "suffragists, but witches" and that "it’s the story of three sisters joining the American suffrage movement, in a world where there’s no such thing as witches, but there used to be. The fight for women’s rights becomes a fight to restore their magic."

== Reception ==
Writing for NPR Jessica P. Wick said that the book was "about what could happen when women talk to each other, sharing knowledge, building community" and that "Harrow likes a secret society in the best way, and Witches is riddled with secrets, honeycombed with groups working toward overlapping or opposing goals." Amy R. Martin of the Southern Review of Books said that the book "lies firmly within the feminist tradition, reflective of the social commentaries of modern feminist thinkers like Kate Manne and Rebecca Traister and reminiscent of women’s recent and growing exercise of their political power, especially as evidenced by the Women's March of 2017 and the #MeToo movement" but that "a book about suffrage and spells became a book about spells." Kibby Robinson of The Nerd Daily said that the book had "lyrical prose and a story that will reach into the core of your being and squeeze" and that "Harrow gives the readers three spectacularly realised sisters and takes them on a journey of forgiveness and the fight to achieve the power of choice." Yasmin Islam of The Tempest said that it was "refreshing to see the characters find pride in being women in a time where it was shunned" and that "although witches have never been traditionally written as humane, this was the most human I’ve read them to be."

== Awards ==
Year	Award	Category	Result	Ref
2021	BFA	Fantasy Novel	Won	
2021	Dragon Awards	Fantasy Novel	Nominated	
2021	Locus	Fantasy Novel	5th	
