= The Fox Wife =

Book by Yangsze Choo

The Fox Wife is a book by Yangsze Choo which has received positive coverage by numerous press outlets.
