= Watchtower (novel) =

1979 novel by American writer Elizabeth A. Lynn

First edition (publ. Berkley Books) Cover art by Eric Ladd

Watchtower is a fantasy novel by American writer Elizabeth A. Lynn published in 1979.

== Plot summary ==
Tornor Keep, in the northern country of Arun, is violently taken by Col Istor, a southern mercenary leader looking to take over the entire north. He kills Athor, the lord of the keep, and takes two prisoners: Athor’s son Errel and watch commander Ryke. Despite his hatred of Col, Ryke agrees to be his new watch commander as long as Errel is left alive and unharmed. Col keeps Errel alive, but makes Errel his fool/jester, forcing him to act like a dog, eat table scraps, and sustain physical abuse. Ryke and Errel secretly communicate, with Ryke also periodically returning to his village, where the people – despite being in no shape to rebel against Col – are still loyal to Errel. Col also turns Ryke’s sister Becke into the “Keep’s woman,” a glorified bedwarmer, without knowing she’s Ryke’s sister.

Col periodically sends raiders to nearby Cloud Keep in order to weaken it for conquest, and soon receives messengers from its lord, Berent One-Eye. The messengers, part of the Green Clan of neutral, genderless, extremely hardy warriors, are received with respect. They meet with Col and his commanders in the watchtower, the highest point in the keep, delivering the message that Berent offers a truce: stop the raids in exchange for Berent sending one of his sons as collateral. Col decides to accept the offer, but to deceptively send some of his men to pose as outlaws around Cloud Keep in order to see if Berent is building strength in preparation for Col to break the truce. Errel asks Ryke to persuade the messengers to help both of them escape by showing Athor’s family ring to them, claiming that he “helped them” when the three were young.

Ryke goes to the messengers, Norres and Sorren, in the night, showing them the ring and noticing that, based on body type, Sorren seems to be a woman. The two agree to help, asking Ryke to bring Errel to meet them in the shadow of the watchtower on the day the messengers leave to deliver Col’s answer to Berent. Ryke and Errel escape with the messengers and deliver the truce offer to Berent, who is now old and stick-thin, prompting Ryke to long for the days of strong leaders like Athor. Berent offers to house the group for two nights, as is the custom, and then send them on their way due to an illness plaguing the keep. Ryke converses with the messengers about how their profession is convenient because they follow war, and there will always be war. Norres and Sorren question this, but Ryke desires nothing but to fight Col Istor. The others argue that Pel Keep will not go to war with Col for another three months at minimum, so Ryke and Errel should accompany them to Vanima, a valley due west with eternal summer. Ryke laughs, considering Vanima (and its ruler, Van) to be a myth, but he goes along with the plan. Along the way, he realizes that Norres and Sorren are both women, having used their androgyny to join the Green Clan. Both were originally from Tornor, with Sorren even remembering Ryke from childhood. The entire truth comes out: Sorren is Athor’s daughter, who was in love with Norres but not allowed to be with her due to the customs of the north stating that women must bear children, so with Errel’s help, the two ran away.

Ryke discovers southern customs that confuse him, particularly women wearing “men’s clothes” (pants and shirts) and running their own trades. They move on, arriving at Vanima, where Ryke witnesses a society free from rank, war, and soldiers, which instead focuses on community and cooperation. He learns that the word "cheari," which Col used to describe Errel as his “fool,” is truly a southern word that means “dancer,” and watches Vanima residents Maranth, Amaranth, Van, and others performing a beautiful dance routine in honor of keeping the world in balance.

After learning that Col broke the truce and has killed Berent, Van convinces Errel that the latter needs to return to the north and take Tornor back from Col, offering to aid in the quest. Ryke, Errel, Van, Sorren, Norres, Maranth, and Hadril (Van and Maranth's son) take up the journey, planning to head first to Pel Keep to enlist Sironen’s aid. Along the way, Norres asks Ryke if he’s in love with Sorren, to which Ryke responds with confused feelings. Norres says that she’ll kill Ryke if he hurts Sorren, and Ryke cries alone, unsure of himself.

At Pel Keep, Sironen takes in the group, who intend to dress as a “chearas” to entertain Col's men and then open the gate for Errel and Sironen's forces. Together, the group storms Cloud Keep and retakes it, then heads for Tornor. A battle ensues, in which Ryke and Van are injured, and Errel kills Col. Ryke discovers that, while raiding the Keep, Sironen’s men have defiled and killed his sister Becke, not knowing who she was. Subsequently, Sorren is made lord of Tornor, since Errel doesn’t want it and she is his sister. When Sironen’s sexist son Arno protests, Sorren defeats him in combat and takes the Keep.

No longer lord of the Keep and thus no longer a prince, Errel decides to return to Vanima, while Ryke is tasked with becoming regent to Cloud Keep. As he speaks with Errel about this decision, Ryke realizes that his confusing feelings toward Sorren are rooted in her resemblance to Errel, whom he truly loves. Satisfied with this understanding, Ryke accepts Sorren’s order, seeing her as the strong leader he longs to serve.

== Reception ==
Greg Costikyan reviewed Watchtower in Ares Magazine #3 and commented that "The plot is a common one; the birthright of a young lord is stolen by invaders, and he must escape and gather forces to reconquer his rightful domain. The book is saved by fine and unpretentious writing, full-fledged characters, and fast-paced plotting. Lynn, I suspect, is another new writer to watch."

Watchtower won the World Fantasy Award—Novel for 1980.

== Reviews ==
- Review by Fritz Leiber (1979) in Locus, #222 June 1979
- Review by Brian Stableford (1980) in Foundation, #18 January 1980
- Review by Charles N. Brown (1979) in Isaac Asimov's Science Fiction Magazine, August 1979
