= Lyonesse (novel) =

1983 fantasy novel by Jack Vance

- Author: Jack Vance
- Language: English
- Genre: Fantasy
- Publication place: American
- Pages: 436
- ISBN: 9780425058732
- OCLC: 971936713
- Followed by: The Green Pearl

Lyonesse is a novel by Jack Vance published first in 1983.

== Plot summary ==
The story has several related storylines which are not always precisely chronological.

Suldrun, daughter of King Casmir of Lyonesse, is a pensive girl who discovers and spends much time in a secluded old garden in the palace grounds as to avoid the more unpleasant obligations of a princess. When Casmir arranges her marriage to Duke Faude Carfilhiot, she resists, and her father confines her to the garden as punishment.

Princes Aillas and Trewan of Troicinet are sent on a sea voyage to visit the various kingdoms of the Elder Isles to gain experience with statecraft. While in port, Trewan learns that his father has died and that Aillas is the heir to the throne. Late at night, Trewan pushes Aillas overboard in an attempt to assassinate him. Aillas washes ashore on the shore of Suldrun's garden. While he recovers, they become lovers and plan to escape; Suldrun becomes pregnant. Aillas is discovered and imprisoned in an oubliette. He eventually escapes and finds that Suldrun has committed suicide. He resolves to go on a quest to find his son, Dhrun.

Dhrun is taken by the fairies and replaced with the changeling Madouc. Dhrun lives and grows nine years in the fairy realm (which passes as only one year for humans), then sets out through the forest of Tantrevalles, a haunted place. He rescues Glyneth, a girl aged about 14, from a troll, and they have a number of adventures before joining Dr. Fidelius. Fidelius is in fact Shimrod, a magician who had his power stolen from him by Faude Carfilhiot and Carfilhiot's lover Tamurello. Carfilhiot realizes that Fidelius is Shimrod, so he kidnaps Dhrun and Glyneth as a type of insurance.

Shimrod can not act directly against Carfilhiot to rescue Glyneth and Dhrun, because that would constitute advocating for Aillas in a political matter and thereby violate an edict of Murgen, the master magician. However, Aillas has learned that Quilcy, King of South Ulfland, has drowned in his bathtub, and that Aillas is his rightful heir by collateral lineage. He lands a force of troops in South Ulfland, proclaims his kingship, and demands a show of fealty from Carfilhiot as Carfilhiot's rightful liege lord. Carfilhiot refuses, and Aillas' Troice troops lay siege to his castle. Aillas' soldiers, informed by his knowledge of the castle's defenses, avoid the traps and pitfalls Carfilhiot has prepared, much to Carfilhiot's dismay. Carfilhiot signals for Tamurello, who confronts Aillas. This gives Shimrod an excuse to signal Murgen, who forbids Tamurello from acting and banishes him to his mansion. Tamurello offers to bring Carfilhiot to his manse, but Carfilhiot refuses to leave his castle. The siege is eventually successful, Dhrun and Glyneth are rescued, and Carfilhiot is hanged as a traitor to his king. When his body is cremated, a green fume escapes and blows out to sea, where it mixes with the spume and condenses into a "green pearl", which sinks into the sea and is swallowed by a fish.

King Casmir agrees to a truce. Aillas, now King of Troicinet, Dascinet and South Ulfland, and his son Dhrun, make a diplomatic visit to Lyonesse. Casmir is puzzled as to how Aillas, a very young man, could have a nine-year-old son, and why Aillas' face seems rather familiar.

== Reception ==
In Issue 24 of Abyss, Jon Schuller reviewed Lyonesse and commented, "The action of the novel demonstrates how well some of Vance's skills translate to a traditional fantasy setting. The characters are well developed and the background is elaborate and incredibility believable, but the most impressive aspect is his exploration of the machineries of intrigue in medieval-type states." Schuller thought that perhaps there were too many characters and plot lines, but concluded, "On the whole, I would recommend Lyonesse without qualification. While it is not light and frivolous reading (with a few exceptions), it is fascinating and puts a whole new complexion on what seems at first to be traditional heroic fantasy fiction."

Greg Costikyan reviewed Lyonesse in Ares Magazine #15 and commented that "Lyonesse will not appeal to all tastes; it is emphatically not written in the telegraphic, Hammet-style prose which many readers find appealing. Like a fine wine, it must be savored, and requires a patient reader. But for those with the patience, it is an eminently rewarding experience."

Dave Langford reviewed Lyonesse for White Dwarf #56, and stated that "Though it has its moments [...] these are diluted by merely adequate passages, as though Vance needs to hoard his strength for this marathon."

== Reviews ==
- Review by Faren Miller (1983) in Locus, #267 April 1983
- Review by Roger C. Schlobin (1983) in Fantasy Newsletter, #60 June-July 1983
- Review by Baird Searles (1983) in Isaac Asimov's Science Fiction Magazine, September 1983
- Review by Algis Budrys (1983) in The Magazine of Fantasy & Science Fiction, September 1983
- Review by Tom Easton (1983) in Analog Science Fiction/Science Fact, Mid-September 1983
- Review by Vincent Omniaveritas (1983) in Cheap Truth #1
