= Thraxas =

Novel series by Martin Scott

- Author: Martin Scott (Martin Millar)
- Country: UK
- Genre: Fantasy
- Publisher: Orbit Books; Self-published via BookBaby
- Published: 1999–2022
- Media type: Digital (e-book); Print (hardcover, paperback)
- No. of books: 12 (List of books)
- Website: www.martinmillar.com/thraxas/thraxas.html

Thraxas is a series of twelve (Note: As of April 2022.) fantasy novels written by British author Martin Millar under the pen name Martin Scott. The first eight were originally published in the United Kingdom by Orbit Books between April 1999 and May 2005. The remaining four titles were self-published by Millar, between March 2013 and April 2022. The series has been generally positively received, and has produced one World Fantasy Award winner.

== Overview ==
The stories take place in a mythical, Middle-earth-type World that includes Humans, Orcs, Elves, and a variety of magical creatures. Thraxas, the eponymous protagonist, is a middle-aged private investigator in the city-state of Turai, a kingdom of middling influence and power. In the pre-series timeline he had been a failed sorcery student, an able soldier, and a far-travelled mercenary. He also used to work at the Palace of Turai, but was booted out for his drunken behavior.

As the series begins, Thraxas is still an excellent swordsman and competent fighter, and has retained some minor magical ability. Mainly though, he just gambles, drinks a lot of beer, and consumes a lot of food. He is always broke and has to live in the poor, rough part of the city, above the tavern of his old friend Gurd, a barbarian. Thraxas is overweight, somewhat bad-tempered, and a keen gambler at the chariot races. In between his other pursuits, he tries to support himself as a detective-for-hire.

Thraxas is usually helped in his cases by his young friend Makri, an escapee from the Orcish gladiator pits, and the best fighter ever seen in Turai. Makri is part Human, part Orc, and part Elf, and she often suffers prejudice from all three races. She works as a waitress at Gurd's tavern, wearing a skimpy chainmail bikini to entice the rough-and-tumble working class customers into leaving better tips. Her exotic good looks and lithe physique have earned her quite a few admirers, but she also has intellectual aspirations, studying at a Turanian College.

Later in the series the bulk of the action shifts away from Turai, as the city is conquered by an Orcish army and most characters, including Thraxas and Makri, are forced to flee. (Note: Starting with book 9 and continuing through book 11; the city returns as the main setting with book 12.) Following the fall of Turai, Thraxas tentatively regains part of his previous status when he is given official responsibilities in the effort to retake the city. This development however has little effect on his behavior or reputation, and as the Orcs (thanks partly to his involvement) are finally defeated, he is again implicated in controversy.

The stories – narrated in first person by Thraxas – happen in real time and are in chronological order. They are also linked by the presence of many of the same characters throughout the series. Typically, Thraxas finds himself entangled in dangerous but realistic situations that involve political intrigue and all kinds of conspiracies. Through luck and pluck, as well as a well-honed sense of humor, he somehow manages to pull through against heavy odds.

== Titles ==
First Edition
No.	Title	Date	Length	Media	ISBN
1	Thraxas	April 1999	224 pp	paperback	978-1-85723-729-0
2	Thraxas and the Warrior Monks	May 1999	256 pp	paperback	978-1-85723-731-3
3	Thraxas at the Races	June 1999	256 pp	paperback	978-1-85723-734-4
4	Thraxas and the Elvish Isles	August 2000	256 pp	paperback	978-1-84149-002-1
5	Thraxas and the Sorcerers	November 2001	272 pp	paperback	978-1-84149-077-9
6	Thraxas and the Dance of Death	May 2002	256 pp	paperback	978-1-84149-121-9
7	Thraxas at War	July 2003	272 pp	paperback	978-1-84149-242-1
8	Thraxas under Siege	May 2005	272 pp	paperback	978-1-84149-254-4
9	Thraxas and the Ice Dragon	March 2013	211 pp (Note: Kindle edition (629 kB, ASIN B00BOV3S9E).)	e-book	978-1-6267527-1-9
10	Thraxas and the Oracle	February 2015	169 pp (Note: Kindle edition (3263 kB, ASIN B00T6JE64W).)	e-book	978-1-4835491-8-7
11	Thraxas of Turai	January 2019	184 pp	e-book, paperback	978-1-79284999-2 (paperback)
12	Thraxas Meets His Enemies	April 2022	187 pp	e-book, paperback	979-8421592259 (paperback)
Books 1–8 published by Orbit Books. Books 9–12 were self-published via BookBaby, with titles also available through CreateSpace

== Publication history ==
The first eight titles were originally released in the UK by Orbit Books as mass market paperbacks between 1999 and 2005; several titles were also released in hardcover by the series' North American publisher Baen Books, starting with Thraxas and the Sorcerers (book 5), in 2005. (Note: Baen released 3 other titles in hardcover: Thraxas and the Dance of Death in 2005, and in 2006, Thraxas under Siege and Thraxas at War (OCLC 60799728, 70230651 and 62341583 respectively).) English-language e-book editions were released by Orbit Books-affiliated publisher Hachette Digital in September 2008. (Note: However, several titles had been previously published electronically: digital editions in libraries (WorldCat catalog).) Series books have also been published in several other countries and languages. (Note: Non-English editions in libraries (WorldCat catalog).)

After the eighth novel, Orbit did not want to publish additional installments. In addition, Millar's agent could not come to an agreement regarding rights of future Thraxas titles with Baen Books. Baen was also republishing the series in omnibus form, two titles at a time; it stopped publication after the second omnibus volume.

Despite the difficulties with publishers, Millar stated that he planned to continue with the series. In September 2012 he blogged that he had nearly finished a 9th book, Thraxas and the Ice Dragon. It was eventually released in March 2013 – almost eight years after the previous volume – as an e-book through BookBaby, a self-publishing company. Millar released the tenth book, Thraxas and the Oracle, via the same channel and format in February 2015; at that time all titles were available in e-book format only.

The series was eventually reprinted between February and October 2017, in single-title or two-title editions. They were released through CreateSpace, a print on demand self-publishing subsidiary of Amazon. As of April 2022 all republished titles were listed in Amazon websites as part of The Collected Thraxas edition. (Note: An Amazon US search conducted April 2022 listed all then–current titles as available to order: "Search for The Collected Thraxas" at archive.today (archived 30 April 2022).)

In January 2019, four years after the release of the tenth book the eleventh installment, Thraxas of Turai, was simultaneously self-published in POD and e-book editions. The series continued with book 12, Thraxas Meets His Enemies, which became available on 1 April 2022 as a POD paperback, followed a few weeks later by an e-book edition.

=== Select editions ===
Baen Omnibus Edition (US – discontinued)
No.	Title	Date	Length	Media	Notes	ISBN
1	Thraxas	August 2003	448 pp	paperback	contains Thraxas and Thraxas and the Warrior Monks	978-0-7434-7152-7
2	Death and Thraxas	August 2004	480 pp	paperback	contains Thraxas at the Races and Thraxas and the Elvish Isles	978-0-7434-8850-1

The Collected Thraxas (selections)
No.	Title	Date	Length	Media	Notes	ISBN
1	Thraxas Books One and Two	February 2017	332 pp	paperback	contains Thraxas and Thraxas and the Warrior Monks	978-1-5424-5834-4
6	Thraxas Book Ten	May 2017	182 pp	paperback	contains Thraxas and the Oracle	978-1-5465-7473-6
Print-on-demand edition, self-published via CreateSpace.

== Reception ==
Locus reviewer Jonathan Strahan praised the first novel in the series as "an entertaining addition to the fantasy PI bookshelf," further stating, "Scott is careful to balance the various requirements of humorous fantasy and PI crime fiction."

A favorable review of the second omnibus Death and Thraxas maintained, "[t]he strength of [the included] novels lies in their humor and quirky characters." In an also-favorable 2005 review of book 5, Thraxas and the Sorcerers in the science fiction magazine Chronicle, frequent series reviewer Don D'Ammassa stated, "[t]he first few volumes in the series were pretty frothy, but I've actually become more fond of the character with the recent volumes,..."

A mini-review by Jon Courtenay Grimwood of Thraxas at War (book 7), appeared in The Guardian (London) in July 2003.

The first book in the series, Thraxas, was the winner of the 2000 World Fantasy Award. (Note: The award was a surprise to some, as was humorously noted in a Fantasy & Science Fiction column: "... a bombshell announcement that's going to be a bigger shock than Thraxas winning the World Fantasy Award.")
