= Martin Millar =

British writer (1956-)

- Born: Glasgow, Scotland
- Occupation: Novelist
- Writing career
- Pen name: Martin Scott
- Period: 1980s–present
- Genres: Pulp noir, Fantasy
- Notable awards: World Fantasy Award, 2000
- Website: www.martinmillar.com

Martin Millar is a Scottish writer from Glasgow who is now resident in London. Under the pseudonym Martin Scott he has authored the Thraxas series of fantasy novels, for the eponymous inaugural volume of which he won the World Fantasy Award for best novel.

== Overview ==
The novels he writes under his own name focus upon urban decay and British subcultures, and the impact these have on a range of characters, both realistic and supernatural. There are elements of magical realism. Some of them are set in Brixton, Millar's one-time place of residence; many are at least semi-autobiographical, and Love and Peace with Melody Paradise and Suzy, Led Zeppelin and Me both feature Millar himself as a character.

His Thraxas novels combine secondary world fantasy and pulp noir thriller. In 2000, he received the World Fantasy Award for best for the first installment, Thraxas.

== Bibliography ==
=== Novels ===
- Milk, Sulphate and Alby Starvation (1987) ISBN 0-947795-91-X
- Lux the Poet (1988) ISBN 0-947795-67-7
- Ruby & The Stone Age Diet (1989) ISBN 0-947795-24-3
- The Good Fairies of New York (1992) ISBN 1-85702-076-6
- Dreams of Sex and Stage Diving (1994) ISBN 1-85702-213-0
- Love and Peace with Melody Paradise (1998) ISBN 0-14-024876-5
- Suzy, Led Zeppelin and Me (2002) ISBN 1-899598-22-7
- Lonely Werewolf Girl (2007) ISBN 0-9554984-0-6
- Curse of the Wolf Girl (2010) ISBN 0-9802260-5-8 (US) ISBN 0-7499-4288-6 (UK) originally titled Queen Vex
- The Anxiety of Kalix the Werewolf (2013) ISBN 978-0349400556
- The Goddess of Buttercups and Daisies (2015) ISBN 978-0349407142
- Kink Me Honey (2016) ISBN 978-1535009898
- Supercute Futures (2018) ISBN 978-0349419343
- Simulation Bleed (2020) ISBN 979-8662626287
- Supercute Second Future (2022) ISBN 979-8836752989

=== Omnibus ===
- The Collected Martin Millar (1998) ISBN 1-85702-910-0 (Contains Lux the Poet, Ruby and the Stone Age Diet and The Good Fairies of New York)

=== Graphic novels ===
- Lux and Alby Sign on and Save the Universe (illustrated by Simon Fraser) 1999 ISBN 1-899866-24-8

=== Novelization ===
- Tank Girl (1994) (based on the 1995 film baed upon the title comics character) ISBN 0-14-024876-5

=== Dramatisation ===
- Emma (based upon Emma by Jane Austen, with Doon MacKichan) 2001 ISBN 1-85459-499-0

=== Short fiction contained in anthologies ===
- "How Sunshine Star-Traveller Lost His Girlfriend" (in Disco Biscuits, 1997, edited by Sarah Champion)
- "Radiant Flower of the Divine Heavens (in Disco 2000, 1998 edited by Sarah Champion)

=== Novels as Martin Scott ===
- Thraxas (winner of the 2000 World Fantasy Award)
- Thraxas and the Warrior Monks
- Thraxas at the Races
- Thraxas and the Elvish Isles
- Thraxas and the Sorcerers
- Thraxas and the Dance of Death
- Thraxas at War
- Thraxas Under Siege
- Thraxas and the Ice Dragon
- Thraxas and the Oracle
- Thraxas of Turai ISBN 978-1792849992
- Thraxas meets his Enemies ISBN 979-8421592259
