= Huang Pei-jia =

Taiwanese actress (born 1988)

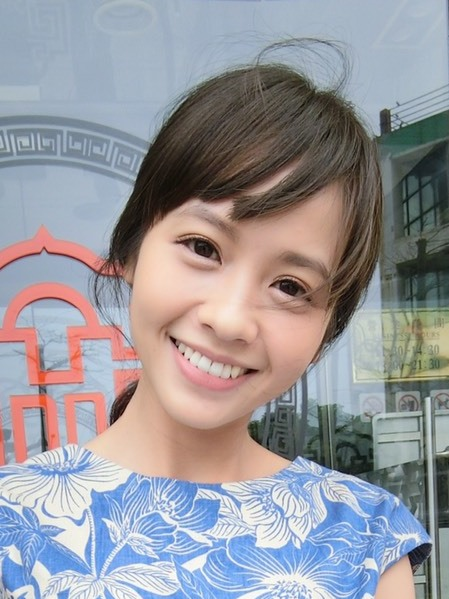
- Huang in 2017
- Born: 29 July 1988 (age 38); Zhongli, Taoyuan County, Taiwan
- Occupation: actress
- Years active: 2008—present

Chinese name
- Traditional Chinese: 黃姵嘉
Transcriptions
Standard Mandarin
- Hanyu Pinyin: Huáng Pèi-jiā
Southern Min
- Hokkien POJ: N̂g Pōe-ka
- Tâi-lô: N̂g Puē-ka

Huang Pei-jia (Chinese: 黃姵嘉; pinyin: Huáng Pèi-jiā; Pe̍h-ōe-jī: N̂g Pōe-ka) is a Taiwanese actress.

== Filmography ==
=== Film ===
Year	English title	Original title	Role	Notes
2008	Drifting Flowers	漂浪青春	Meigo (Older)	
2011	Lovesick	戀愛恐慌症	Hsiao An	
2012	Cha Cha for Twins	寶米恰恰	Poni Chang, Mini Chang	
2014	Second Chance	逆轉勝	Hsieh Jen-hsiang	
2014	A Minute More	只要一分鐘	A Tan	
2016	Yes, Sir! 7	報告班長7：勇往直前	Li Na	
2017	Absolute Territory	絕對領域	Hsiao Ai	short
2017	Meant to Be	冥中注定我愛你	Chang Chien-chien	
2022	Goddamned Asura	該死的阿修羅	Vita	
2023	U Motherbaker – The Movie	我的婆婆怎麼把○○搞丟了	Hsi I-Ou	
2023	Refugee X	隣人X 疑惑の彼女	Lin Yiren	Japanese film

=== Television series ===
Year	English title	Original title	Role	Originating network
2008	Turn Around to See Love	回頭看見愛	Lu Yen-Feng	Da Ai Television
2012	The Smiling Starlight	微笑星光	Liu Chia-Ching	Da Ai Television
2013	Amour et Pâtisserie	沒有名字的甜點店	Liao's daughter	PTS, Taiwan
2013	Backlight Lovers	逆光青春	Huang Lin-Ta	
2015	Be with You	好想談戀愛	Hsia Man-an	
2015	Long Day's Journey into Light	出境事務所	Lo Hsiao-en	Hakka TV
2015	Happy Together	同樂會	Ting Wei-Wei	
2016	Life List	遺憾拼圖	Xu Sisi	
2018	Roseki	客家劇場–台北歌手	Su Yu-lan	
2019	Handsome Stewardess	帥T空姐	Meng Lian	GagaOOLala
2020	The Ghost Bride	彼岸之嫁	Pan Li-lan	Netflix
2023	Goodbye Again	再見之後	Ceng Chu-wei	

=== Miniseries ===
Year	English title	Original title	Role	Originating network
2008	Turn Around to See Love	回頭看見愛	Lu Yen-Feng	Da Ai Television
2012	The Smiling Starlight	微笑星光	Liu Chia-Ching	Da Ai Television
2015	Happy Together	同樂會	Ting Wei-Wei	Line TV
2017	The Bangle	老爸上身	Lai Pei-ju	CHOCO TV
2019	Handsome Stewardess	帥T空姐	Meng Lien	GagaOOLala
2020	The Ghost Bride	彼岸之嫁	Pan Li-lan	Netflix
2020	Dream Raider	獵夢特工	Ting Lu-Hsi	HBO Asia
2021	Heaven on the 4th Floor	四樓的天堂	Lin-lin	PTS
2022	Do You Dare? Level Crossing	你，敢不敢？- 平交道		

== Awards and nominations ==
Year	Award	Category	Nominated work	Result
2018	53rd Golden Bell Awards	Best Leading Actress in a Television Series	Roseki	Won
