= The Dancers of Arun =

1979 novel by American writer Elizabeth A. Lynn

First edition (publ. Berkley/Putnam) Cover art by Mike Mariano

The Dancers of Arun is a fantasy novel by American writer Elizabeth A. Lynn, published in 1979.

== Plot summary ==
Roughly six generations after Sorren’s reign – which eliminated wars in the north by normalizing chearis and balancing the chea – Tornor is ruled by Lord Morven, uncle of Kerris, a disabled scribe working under the tutelage of elderly Josen, a member of the Scholar’s Guild / Black Clan, in an effort to preserve the old northern runes before they go extinct. Tornor still trains fighters, but most of them move to the cities of Arun, such as Tezera or Mahita, to join the city guards. Kerris frequently has “fits” in which he feels like he is occupying two bodies: his own and that of his brother Kel, a cheari whose whereabouts are unknown. While working one day, Josen confides that he finds the records of Sorren’s reign frustrating, because they mention that she was a member of the Green Clan and a cheari, which should be impossible – Josen uses this as justification for his belief that spoken records cannot be trusted. Soon, he offers to write a letter to the Scholar’s Guild in order to see if Kerris can move south and become a historian, but Kel’s chearas arrives with the intention of bringing Kerris south with them.

Kerris is introduced to Kel’s chearas – Elli, Irene, Riniard, Jensie, Arillard, and Cal, who are polyamorous and free with their bodies. On their trip to the city Eliath, Kel tells Kerris that his “fits” are actually Inspeech, a witch-gift that allows one to do incredible things with their mind. Kerris also learns about the Asech tribes and that there are many of them, some of whom make war and some who trade with southerners and don’t carry weapons at all. Soon, the group is stuck in a storm on their way to Galbareth and seeks refuge in a remote village led by a woman named Tamis, who lets the group stay in the village’s birthing house, to the chagrin of Riniard, whose culture doesn’t allow men in birthing houses. Riniard soon gets in a fight, which is broken up thanks to Kerris’s Inspeech. Tamis asks them to pay the debt they owe for injuring the kid by doing his field work for a day, which Kel promises to do after they go to Elath.

The group finds that Elath has recently been attacked by one of the Asech tribes, who also possess witch-gifts and have burned part of the town with the intent to frighten rather than kill, though their reasoning remains unknown. Kel reunites with his lover, Sefer, prompting jealousy from Kerris, who craves Kel’s attention and feels that his two former lovers only slept with him out of pity. Elli expresses interest in Kerris, but knows he loves Kel. Soon, Kerris and Kel become lovers, and Kerris and Sefer become friends, with Sefer attempting to teach Kerris how to use his gift properly and create a “barrier” in his mind that prevents him from accidentally diving into other people’s thoughts and emotions (which is what led to his fits before). Sefer also teaches Kerris about the different types of witch-gifts, including far-traveling, weather-working, and more.

The Asech tribe, led by a woman named Thera, capture Riniard when he attempts to spy on them. Thera states that the tribe will soon return and that she wants six of her people to learn to use the kinds of witch-gifts the chearis use, and that she will return Riniard alive if they cooperate. Sefer aids the group of Asech after learning their stories: all of them were ostracized from their respective tribes for possessing with-gifts, and after joining together, created powerful barriers in their minds so they couldn’t be found. He teaches each of them – Thera, Jacob, Nerim, Mirian, and Khelad – which gifts they possess and how to embrace them, all except Thera’s partner Barat, who is found not to have any gifts. Soon after, Sefer teaches Kerris to create a barrier, and he finally recalls the moment he lost his arm, which begins to free his mind.

Angered by the fact that Sefer cannot give him powers, Barat captures and kills Sefer. Thera tries to intervene, but Barat mortally wounds her. The chearas arrives, with Kel killing Barat and the rest recovering Sefer’s body. After the funeral, Jacob and Nerim return to Elath and begin to live among its people, with Jacob, also a patterner, wishing to become apprentice to Kel.

Kerris considers remaining in Elath to teach at the school, which Sefer wanted him to do. However, he realizes he needs to figure out what he himself wants, and instead leaves and rejoins the chearas at Mahita, who plan on soon paying their debt to Tamis.

== Reception ==
Greg Costikyan reviewed The Dancers of Arun in Ares Magazine #5 and commented that "The primary thrust of the novels is their Message: that we can live in harmony, that capitalism is not necessary since we can all share in love and wonderfulness, and that all problems can be solved if we have the courage to be human. Nice enough, but hardly earth-shattering."

Kirkus Reviews states "Lynn is to be admired for attempting serious things in the fantasy genre, but here nothing quite works: the settings remain faceless despite any amount of description; the love story awkwardly combines homosexual incest and drenching sentimentality; and Lynn's prose style is laconic to the point of numbness. A gifted writer, gone much astray."

== Reviews ==
- Review by Baird Searles (1979) in Isaac Asimov's Science Fiction Magazine, September 1979
- Review by Orson Scott Card (1980) in Destinies, Spring 1980
- Review by Michael Bishop (1980) in The Magazine of Fantasy & Science Fiction, June 1980
- Review by Darrell Schweitzer (1980) in Science Fiction Review, August 1980
- Review by Ian Williams (1980) in Paperback Inferno, Volume 4, Number 2
- Review [French] by Emmanuel Jouanne (1982) in Fiction, #331
- Review by Marleen S. Barr [as by Marleen Barr] (1982) in Extrapolation, Spring 1982
- Review [German] by Andreas Decker (1983) in Science Fiction Times, Juni 1983
