= The White People =

Short story by Arthur Machen

- Short story by Arthur Machen

Text available at Wikisource
- Country: Wales
- Language: English
- Genre: Horror

Publication
- Publisher: J & W Horlick's (serial); Grant Richards (book publication)
- Media type: Print (Serial, Hardcover)
- Publication date: 1904 (serial); 1906 (book)

"The White People" is a horror short story by Welsh author Arthur Machen. Written in the late 1890s, it was first published in 1904 in Horlick's Magazine, edited by Machen's friend A. E. Waite, then reprinted in Machen's collection The House of Souls (1906).

The story has since been described as an important example of horror fiction, and even as one of the greatest horror stories of all time, influencing generations of later writers.

== Plot ==
In a decaying suburban home on the outskirts of London, the recluse Ambrose speaks at length to his visitor Cotgrave on the true nature of sin and holiness, insisting that both are rare spiritual extremes and ecstatic withdrawals from ordinary life. In his argument, common crimes such as murder, theft, or adultery are merely social nuisances committed by incomplete or animalistic people, while real sin is a positive passion of the solitary soul; in an attempt to seize heavenly knowledge by forbidden means, the sinner repeats the Fall and transforms into a demon. Holiness seeks to recover a lost natural ecstasy, while sin reaches for what was never human. Ambrose illustrates his thesis by lending Cotgrave a small green morocco notebook written by a girl he once knew.

The notebook is the girl's diary. From her earliest childhood, she has lived in a private world of secrets taught by her nurse. She remembers speaking an unknown language to pale faces that visited her cradle, and, at five, witnessing two luminous white figures emerge from a woodland pool to dance and sing. The terrified nurse makes her swear silence. By adolescence, the girl has absorbed a whole occult lore involving secret alphabets, ceremonies designated by colours (White, Green, and especially Scarlet), dances, and the names of beings she must never write down. On the day she later calls the White Day, she follows a brook into an unknown country of thorn tunnels, grey rocks that seem to grimace and writhe, circular patterns of stone, and a high green mound. She drinks from a stream that tastes like wine, bathes her feet in a moss-rimmed well, and finally discovers a hidden wood. There, for an instant, she glimpses something so beautiful and terrible that she flees in ecstasy and terror.

The girl remembers the nurse's tales of clay images that can bless or destroy, of the Lady Avelin who murdered suitors with wax dolls, and of night gatherings on a forbidden hill. Practicing the rites herself, she fashions a finer clay figure than the nurse ever made, returns alone to the strange landscape, repeats the charms at the well, and approaches the secret wood blindfolded. On the third circuit, she finds what the stories promised and learns to summon the nymphs; the dark one, Alanna, turns a woodland pool into fire. At this point, the manuscript breaks off.

When Cotgrave returns the book, Ambrose reveals the girl disappeared about a year after the last entry. He found her body lying before a white Roman statue hidden in the same thicket she had described; Ambrose regards her as having "poisoned herself—in time," comparing her fate to a child finding the key to a locked medicine cabinet. The statue, long incorporated into the mythology of the Witches' Sabbath, was smashed to powder by Ambrose's command. The girl's ordinary household, Ambrose notes, could only invent conventional explanations for her death, not understanding that she had achieved, in her solitude, the rare spiritual state whose nature he had tried to explain.

== Background ==
The story was written in the late 1890s as part of Machen's struggle to find a direction for a projected novel, other outgrowths of which were published as the novella A Fragment of Life (collected in The House of Souls) and as the collection of prose poems Ornaments in Jade (1924). Machen had read widely in mystical literature and folklore ever since an early employer had set him to work cataloguing occult books, and his learning gave his tale a depth and verisimilitude unusual in such works.

The use of the Green Book as a false document has roots in the Gothic tradition and is similar to the use of such documents by Bram Stoker in Dracula and to H. P. Lovecraft's use of the Necronomicon and Wilbur Whateley's diary in "The Dunwich Horror". Some of the strange words and names in the Green Book are actual occult terms, but most were invented by Machen for the story. Of these, some would be picked up by later authors of weird fiction—notably "Aklo", which was used by Lovecraft in connection with the "Sabaoth" invocation in "The Dunwich Horror".

== Reception and influence ==
The story has frequently been reprinted, and scholars and devotees of supernatural fiction often cite it as a classic of the genre. E. F. Bleiler wrote that the narrative in the Green Book "is probably the finest single supernatural story of the century, perhaps in the literature", and Michael Dirda has stated: "If I were to list the greatest supernatural short stories of all time, I would start with Arthur Machen’s 'The White People,' about a young girl’s unknowing initiation into an ancient, otherworldly cult." S. T. Joshi has called the diary "a masterpiece of indirection, a Lovecraft plot told by James Joyce", and H. P. Lovecraft himself wrote that "Machen's narrative, a triumph of skilful selectiveness and restraint, accumulates enormous power as it flows on in a stream of innocent childish prattle".

Lovecraft adopted some of Machen's techniques and terminology for use in his Cthulhu Mythos stories. The story has also served as the inspiration for T. E. D. Klein's novel The Ceremonies and may have been an influence on the plot of Guillermo del Toro's film Pan's Labyrinth. The 2019 novel The Twisted Ones by T. Kingfisher (Ursula Vernon) is a contemporary take on the story.

== See also ==
- Caerdroia
