= Dark Gods =

Dark Gods may refer to:

- Dark Gods (Anatolian), a group of malevolent Anatolian deities.
- Dark Gods (novel), a novel by T. E. D. Klein.
