= The Great God Pan =

1894 novella by Arthur Machen

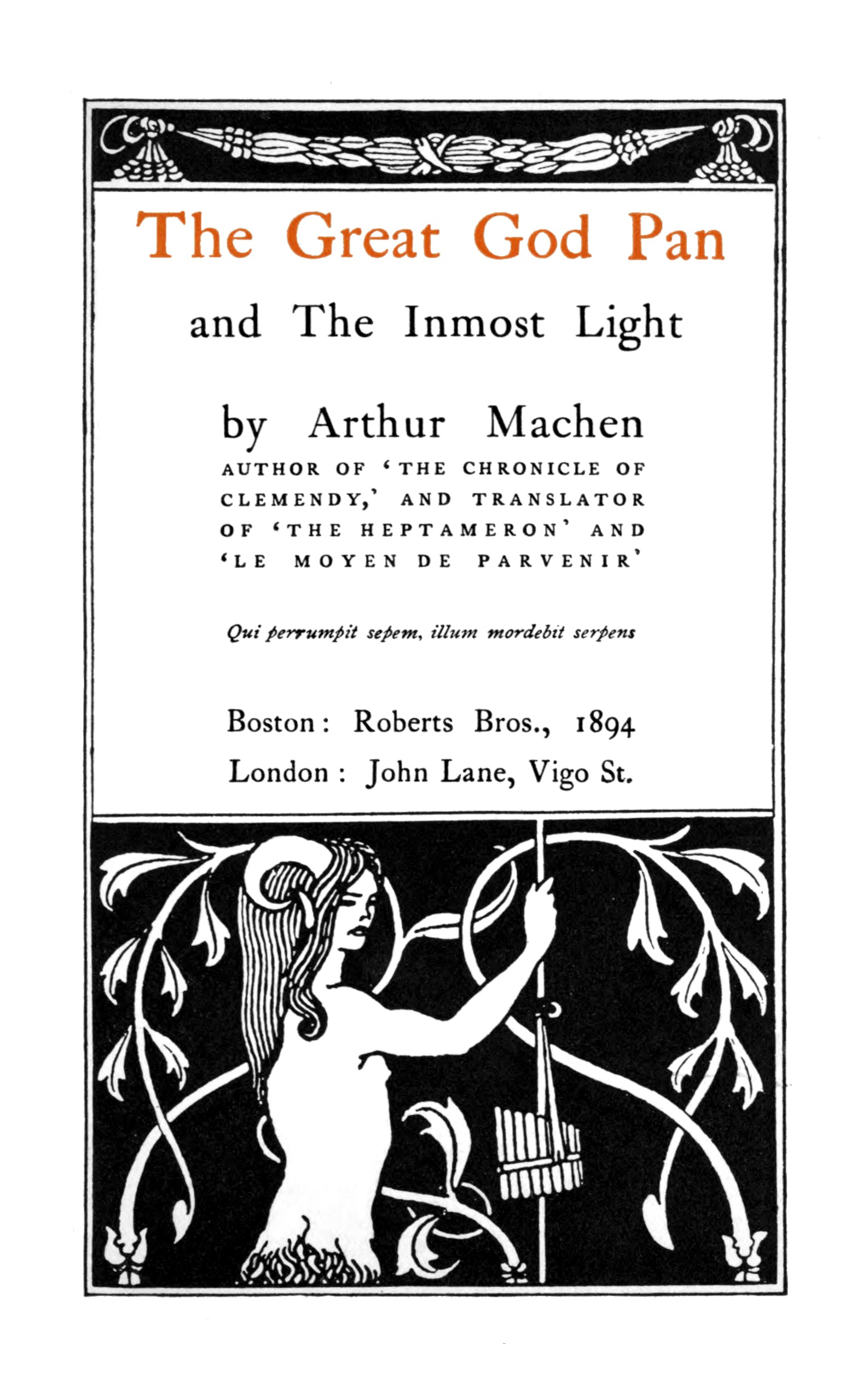
- Title page
- Author: Arthur Machen
- Cover artist: Aubrey Beardsley
- Language: English
- Genre: Decadent; fantasy literature; Gothic horror; science fiction
- Publisher: John Lane
- Publication date: 1894
- Publication place: United Kingdom
- Media type: Print (hardcover)

The Great God Pan is an 1894 horror and fantasy novella by the Welsh writer Arthur Machen. Machen was inspired to write The Great God Pan by his experiences at the ruins of a pagan temple in Wales. What would become the first chapter of the novella was published in the newspaper The Whirlwind in 1890. Machen later extended The Great God Pan and it was published as a book alongside another story, "The Inmost Light", in 1894. The novella begins with an experiment to allow a teenager named Mary to see the supernatural world. This is followed by an account of a series of mysterious happenings and deaths over many years surrounding a woman named Helen Vaughan.

On publication, it was widely denounced by the press as degenerate and horrific because of its implied sexual content, and the novella hurt Machen's reputation as an author. Beginning in the 1920s, Machen's work was critically re-evaluated and The Great God Pan has since garnered a reputation as a classic of horror. Literary critics have noted the influence of other nineteenth-century authors on The Great God Pan and offered differing opinions on whether or not it can be considered an example of Gothic fiction or science fiction. The novella influenced the work of horror writers such as Bram Stoker, H. P. Lovecraft, and Stephen King, and has been adapted for the stage twice.

== Plot ==
In mid-19th century Wales, Mr. Clarke, a businessman from London, agrees to witness an experiment performed by his friend, Dr. Raymond. Raymond is to perform minor brain surgery on his ward, Mary, who is about seventeen. He believes the surgery will open her mind to the spiritual world, an experience he notes the ancients called "seeing the great god Pan". She awakens from the operation awed and terrified but quickly becomes "a hopeless idiot".

Twenty-three years later, Clarke is writing a book entitled Memoirs to Prove the Existence of the Devil. He recounts a story he has been told of a beautiful but sinister girl named Helen V., reportedly an orphan, who, at age 12, had been sent by a distant relative to live with a family in a Welsh village. She spent much of her time in the woods near her house, and sometimes took other children on her prolonged rambles. One day, a young boy stumbled across Helen "playing on the grass with a 'strange naked man'". The boy became hysterical and later, after seeing a Roman statue of a satyr's head, was left with a permanent intellectual disability. Helen later formed an unusually close friendship with a neighbour, Rachel, whom she led several times into the woods. On one occasion Rachel returned home distraught and half-naked. She told her mother what happened in the forest, but Clarke finds it too monstrous to reveal. Rachel subsequently died a "terrible death".

Clarke's acquaintance, Mr Villiers, happens across his old friend Herbert, who has become a vagrant since they last met. When asked how he has fallen so low, Herbert replies that he has been "corrupted body and soul" by his wife, Helen Vaughan, who fled with his fortune. Villiers's friend Austin later tells him that a well-to-do gentleman had died of fright after seeing something in Herbert and Helen's home. Herbert is later found dead. Clarke connects Helen Vaughan with Helen V. and advises Villiers to drop the matter for his own happiness.

Villiers and Austin learn that Helen was in Buenos Aires with Austin's friend, the painter Arthur Meyrick, who has died mysteriously. She returns to London under the pseudonym Mrs. Beaumont and engages in acts worse than "the dread and horror of death itself". Soon afterwards, a series of rich, carefree gentlemen in the city commit suicide. The last person known to have been in the presence of each of them was Mrs. Beaumont. Villiers learns Mrs. Beaumont's true identity, and he and Clarke, bringing a noose, confront Helen in her house. They tell her she must hang herself or they will expose her. Helen does so and starts transforming between human and beast, male and female, dividing and reuniting, before turning into a jelly-like substance and finally dying.

Clarke writes to Dr. Raymond, telling him of his visit to the Welsh village where Helen had lived. In a nearby museum he saw the remains of a pillar honouring the Celtic god Nodens. The Latin inscription on the pillar reads, "To the great god Nodens (the god of the Great Deep or Abyss), Flavius Senilis has erected this pillar on account of the marriage which he saw beneath the shade." He writes that historians are puzzled as to what the inscription refers to. Raymond replies, revealing that Helen was the child of Mary, who died shortly after her daughter's birth. Mary became pregnant after his experiment caused her to see the god Pan.

== Background ==
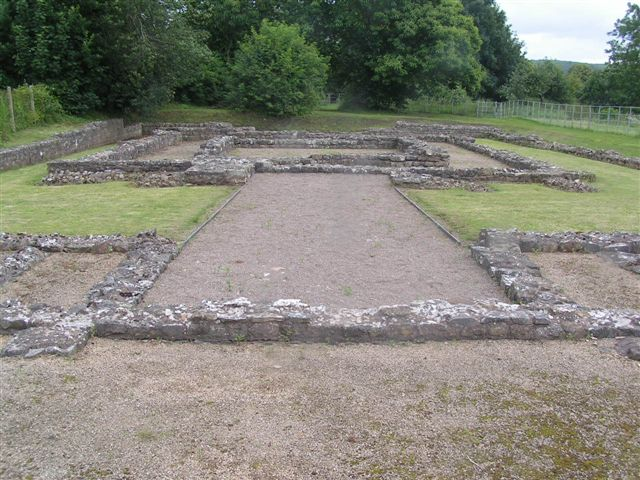
Arthur Machen credited his childhood visits to the ruined Roman temple at Caerwent (pictured), which he believed was dedicated to the god Nodens, as his inspiration for The Great God Pan.

Machen's lifelong fascination with occultism began after he read an article on alchemy in an edition of Charles Dickens's periodical Household Words belonging to his father, a clergyman. In his 1922 autobiography, Far Off Things, Machen wrote that The Great God Pan was inspired by the times he visited the Usk, a Welsh river, and the Welsh towns of Caerleon on the Usk and Caerwent as a boy; all of these places had been settled by the Romans. He wrote that "strange relics" were frequently found at Caerwent from the ruined temple of "Nodens, god of the depths".

In writing the novella, he tried to "pass on the vague, indefinable sense of awe and mystery and terror that [he] had received" while visiting those ruins. Machen felt that he had "transliterated [the feeling] clumsily" in The Great God Pan, elaborating: "I translated awe, at worst awfulness, into evil; again, I say, one dreams with fire and works in clay." Dennis Denisoff said that Machen's decision to make Helen Vaughan the child of a Welsh woman and a pagan figure "parallels Machen's own authorial self-identity as one arising from not only his Welsh ancestry but also pagan myth."

What is now the first chapter of the novella was published in 1890 in a magazine called The Whirlwind, while what is now the third chapter of the book was published in the same magazine the following year as a standalone short story called "The City of Resurrections". Machen only viewed the two works as connected after they were finished. Once he decided the two stories were connected, Machen wrote the rest of The Great God Pan in a single evening save for its final chapter. Machen did not think of an ending for the tale for months, and in that time believed that the novella would remain unfinished forever. The last chapter was completed in June 1891. Machen sent the novella to the publisher Blackwood, who rejected it, deeming it a clever story that "shrink[s] ... from the central idea". It was accepted by John Lane and published in 1894. When published as a book, The Great God Pan was accompanied by another Machen tale, "The Inmost Light", which also features a mad scientist and elements of science fiction. The book's cover was illustrated by Aubrey Beardsley.

== Analysis ==
=== Genre ===
Joe Sommerlad of The Independent views The Great God Pan as a work of Gothic horror. According to The Encyclopedia of Science Fiction, the story is "typical of Victorian [science fiction] horror at about the time [science fiction] was beginning to shed its Gothic elements into a separate Horror/fantasy genre". Aaron Worth writes that The Great God Pan superficially resembles science fiction due to its depiction of Dr. Raymond as a mad scientist, but it cannot be seen as an example of the genre as it posits that occultism is superior to science. The novella has been classified as Decadent literature as well, as it features hallmarks of the genre such as "occultism, paganism, non-mainstream eroticism, sexual diversity, the femme fatale, violent and strange deaths, and the simultaneous investment in and disavowal of bourgeois identities". Pan has also been described as fantasy literature and as a cautionary tale against men mistreating women the way that Raymond mistreated Mary.

=== Influences ===
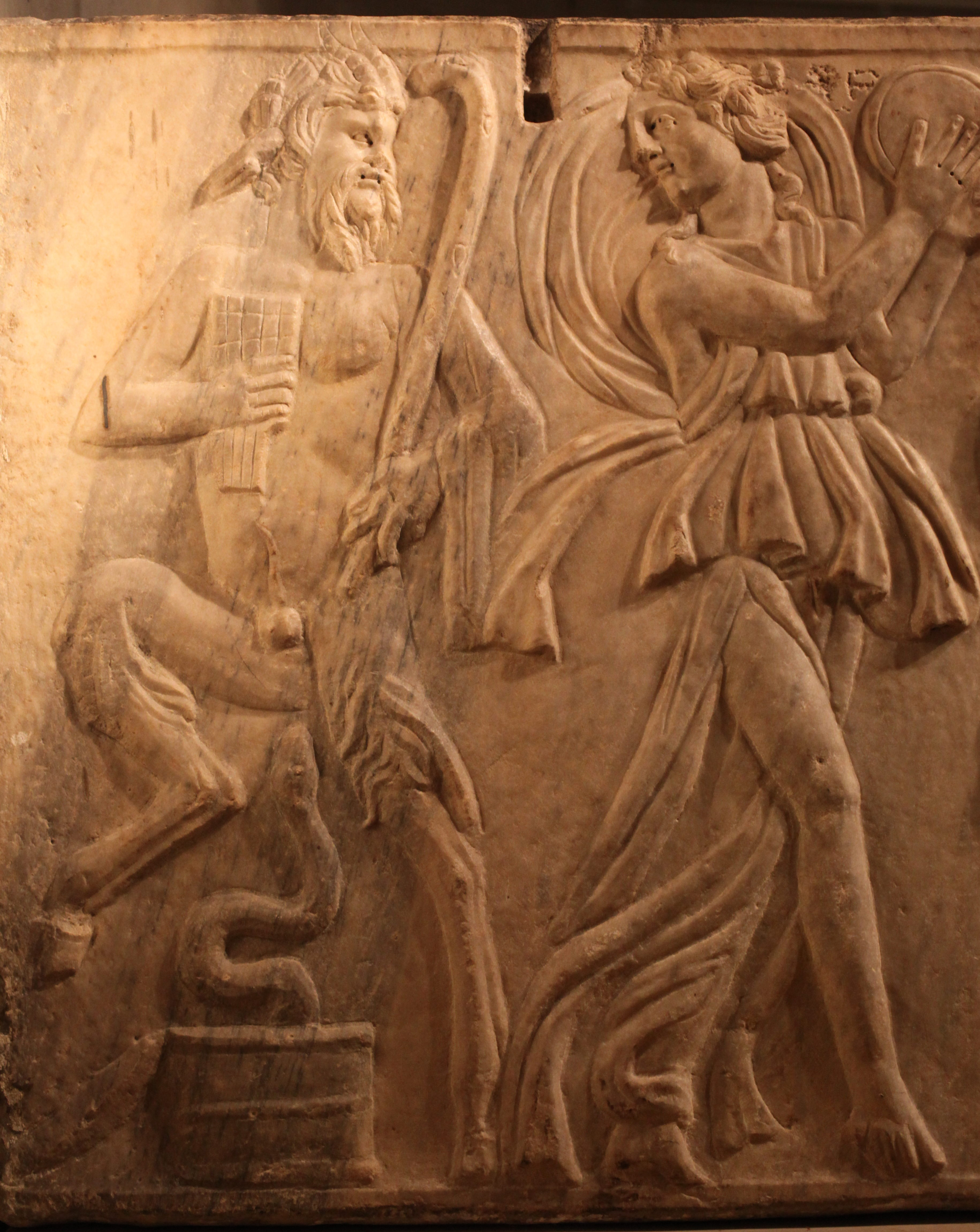
Third-century relief carving from a Roman sarcophagus showing Pan dancing with a maenad ("mad woman") playing a tambourine

Pan was an ancient Greek god, primarily worshipped in Arcadia, who was associated with shepherds and their flocks and with nature. He was believed to lurk in caves, mountains, and other lonely, isolated locations. In some stories, he inflicted his enemies with sudden terror (i.e., panic). The phrase, "the great God Pan" comes from an ancient Greek folktale recorded in Plutarch's De defectu oraculorum (On the Decline of Oracles), which claims that a Greek sailor near the island of Paxi during the reign of Emperor Tiberius (ruled 14–37 AD) heard a voice cry out, "When you are arrived at Palodes, take care to make it known that the great God Pan is dead." Early Christian commentaries suggested that this event occurred at the same time as the death of Christ and that the "death" of Pan represented the transition from a pagan to a Christian world.

This story had particular resonance with Victorian literary audiences. In 1844, Elizabeth Barrett Browning wrote her poem "The Dead Pan", an adaption of Plutarch's story which insisted that proper Christian literature should abandon Greek mythology, with each stanza ending in the words "Pan, Pan is dead." As a member of the Decadent movement, Machen sought to subvert traditional themes and transgress literary boundaries, an agenda which made Pan a particularly appealing figure. The title of The Great God Pan appears to have been specifically derived from Browning's later poem "A Musical Instrument" (1862), in which the first line of every stanza ends with the words "the great god Pan". Machen's use of Pan in the novella may have also been influenced by Robert Louis Stevenson's essay "Pan's Pipes" (1878) and Algernon Charles Swinburne's poem "A Nympholept" (1894), in which Pan is portrayed as the "emblem of the delicious combination of ecstasy and terror".

In a review of the novella for Black Gate, Matthew David Surridge hypothesized that Machen took inspiration from Mary Shelley's Frankenstein (1818) in his portrayal of Dr. Raymond as a mad scientist akin to Victor Frankenstein. The works of Robert Louis Stevenson, especially his 1886 novella Strange Case of Dr Jekyll and Mr Hyde, were among Machen's most significant influences when writing The Great God Pan. John Gawsworth saw Machen's novella as reminiscent of the horror stories of Edgar Allan Poe and Sheridan Le Fanu. Aaron Worth noted similitude between the death of Helen Vaughan and the theories of alchemist Thomas Vaughan, who is the character's namesake, and Helen's disintegration recalls the alchemical concept of the prima materia. John C. Tibbetts observes similarities between Helen Vaughan and Ayesha, the sexually liberated demonic priestess from H. Rider Haggard's She: A History of Adventure (1886). Machen wrote that several critics felt that Joris-Karl Huysmans's novels À rebours (1884) and Là-bas (1891) had inspired The Great God Pan, though he did not read either book until after Pan was published. Upon reading the two novels, Machen concluded that "my critics had not read them either".

=== Religious themes ===
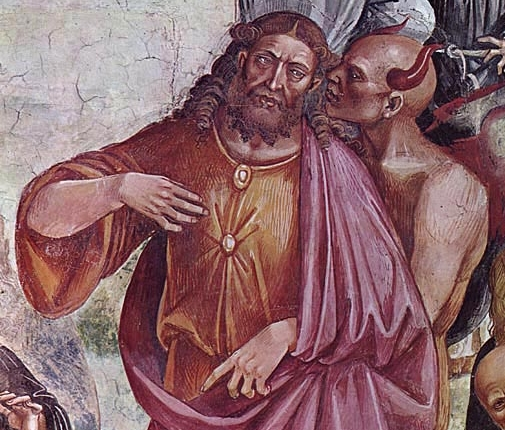
Helen Vaughan and Pan have respectively been compared to the Antichrist (left) and Lucifer (right).

The novella is characteristic of a late nineteenth-century interest in paganism in general and Pan in particular that is found in the works of Florence Farr and Kenneth Grahame. According to the British scholar of modern literature Roger Luckhurst, Raymond expresses a typical Neoplatonist view of reality in which the true object of study is the revelation of a "higher, hidden spiritual world". He is therefore "an occultist rather than a materialist scientist". Neoplatonism is also commonly regarded as the last school of pagan philosophy and Raymond's views therefore relate back to the recurring theme of the death of Pan.

Author Theodora Goss sees The Great God Pan as equating paganism with irrationality and what Carl Jung would call the collective unconscious. Literary critic Kostas Boyiopoulos reads the story from a Judeo-Christian perspective, arguing that Helen Vaughan embodies a "female version of an antichrist", a perversion of Jesus, as well as the figure of Lilith from Judaic myth, with Helen's mother Mary being a "direct analogy of the biblical Virgin Mary". Black Gates's Matthew David Surridge believes that the story associates paganism with sex and femininity, while portraying Helen as a female Antichrist, a view shared by James Goho in Journeys into Darkness: Critical Essays on Gothic Horror (2014). Surridge adds "from another perspective: [Helen] is the undoing of progress. Rather than proceeding from paganism to Christianity, as orthodox Victorian belief imagined the progress of history, she is a reversal of time, the revenge of the atavistic." In keeping with this idea, Surridge sees Mary's name as a reference to Mary, mother of Jesus and Helen's name as a reference to the pagan figure Helen of Troy. Goho interprets the story as Machen's warning against the abandonment of "true religion" and the embrace of paganism.

At one point in the novella, a Latin creed is recited: Et Diabolus Incarnatus Est. Et Homo Factus Est ("And the Devil was made incarnate. And was made man."). Luckhurst identifies this as a blasphemous rewriting of the Nicene Creed, an early Christian creed which includes the line: "By the power of the Holy Spirit he [Jesus] became incarnate from the Virgin Mary, and was made man." Goho writes that the portrayal of Pan in the novella draws on the mythology of Lucifer and depictions of Pan as "the fetish for evil and suffering and the danger and dread of the wilderness", rather than depictions of Pan as a playful and harmless god. Surridge sees the book's references to Satan and Nodens as implying that Satan, Nodens and Pan are the same being, while Goho connects the novella to the fact that early Christians associated Pan with the devil.

== Critical reception ==
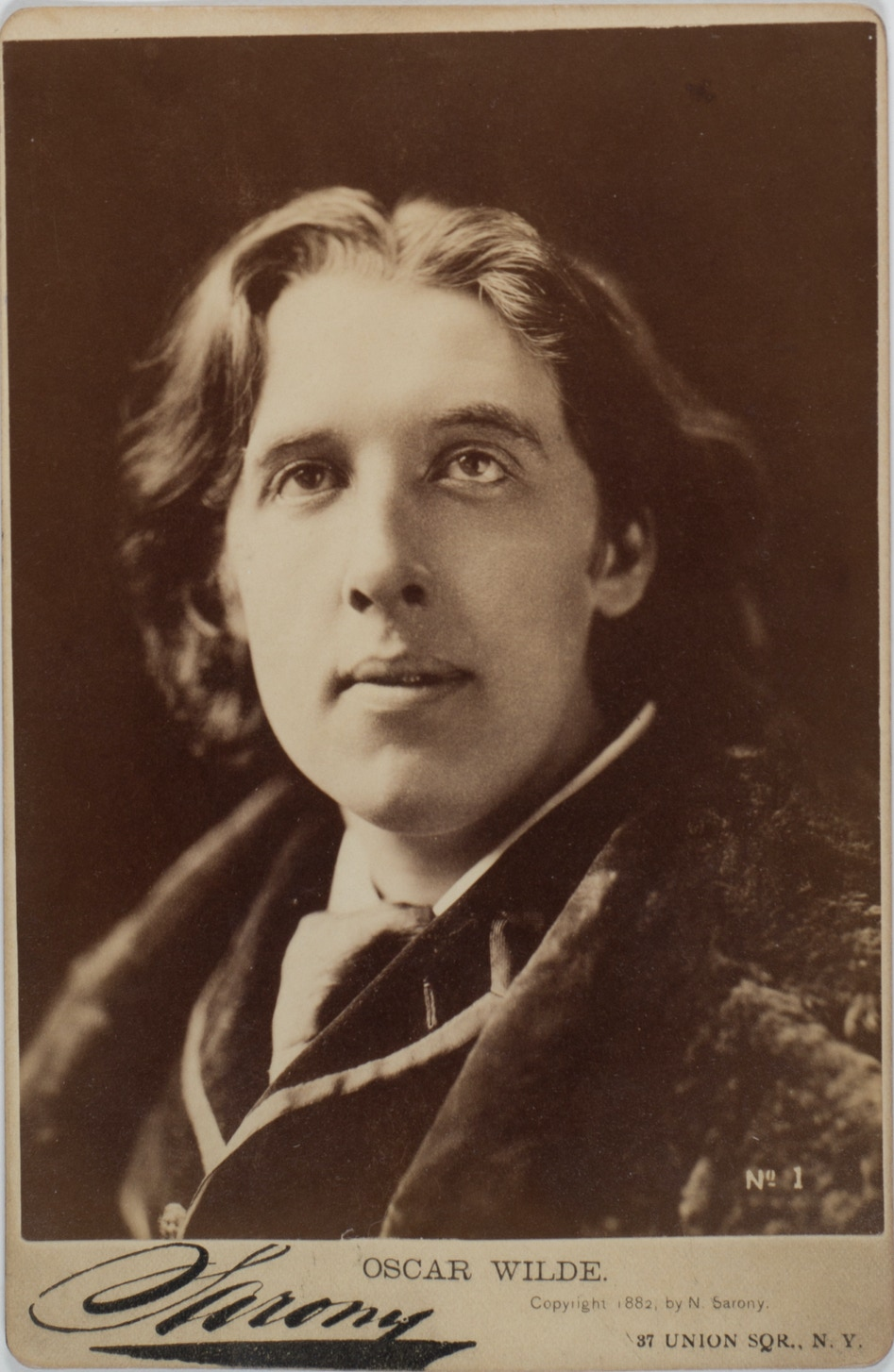
Oscar Wilde praised the novella.

The Great God Pan's implied sexuality caused a scandal upon its original release and hurt Machen's reputation as an author. Reviewing the novella for the magazine Literary News, Richard Henry Stoddard criticised the story as "too morbid to be the production of a healthy mind". The art critic Harry Quilter's review of the book, titled "The Gospel of Intensity", and published in The Contemporary Review in June 1895, was even more harsh. Quilter declared: "'The Great God Pan' is, I have no hesitation in saying, a perfectly abominable story, in which the author has spared no endeavour to suggest loathsomeness and horror which he describes as beyond the reach of words." Quilter warned that Machen's books were a dangerous threat to the entire British public and that they would destroy readers' sanities and senses of morality. Quilter went on to attack the story's publisher, John Lane, as well as Machen himself: "Why should he be allowed, for the sake of a few miserable pounds, to cast into our midst these monstrous creations of his diseased brain?" Quilter added that works of fiction like Machen's should be unanimously condemned by literary critics and newspapers: "If the Press was so disposed it could stamp out such art and fiction in a few months: And that disposition must be acquired, must even be enforced." He was particularly harsh in his denunciation of sexual ambiguity and polymorphous androgyny in the book. He expressed revulsion at Machen's description of Helen's sex changing immediately before her death and concluded his review with a comment of distaste regarding the "nasty little naked figure of dubious sex and humanity with which Mr. Aubrey Beardsley has prefaced the story". A positive appraisal of the novella came from Oscar Wilde, who called it "un succès fou".

Machen's literary reputation was re-evaluated in the 1920s and The Great God Pan has since attained the reputation of a horror masterpiece. In "Supernatural Horror in Literature" (1926; revised 1933), H. P. Lovecraft praised the story, saying: "No one could begin to describe the cumulative suspense and ultimate horror with which every paragraph abounds"; he added that "the sensitive reader" reaches the end with "an appreciative shudder". Lovecraft also noted, however, that "melodrama is undeniably present, and coincidence is stretched to a length which appears absurd upon analysis". Bennett Cerf described the story as a "masterpiece". Brian Stableford stated that The Great God Pan is "the archetypal Decadent horror story" and described the story as "highly original". Stephen King referred to it as "one of the best horror stories ever written. Maybe the best in the English language." The Washington Post's Elizabeth Hand deemed it "one of the greatest supernatural tales ever written". Black Gate's Matthew David Surridge said that The Great God Pan is "a fascinating, troubling story, and, for all its influence, not like much else than I can think of. It's not simple, and yet it's effective, more so than can easily be explained."

Some commentary on The Great God Pan has focused on its portrayal of women. Surridge sees the novella as expressing a fear of women even though the ultimate source of horror in the story is a male deity. The Encyclopedia of Science Fiction says that Helen's "metamorphosis ... remains one of the most dramatically horrible and misogynistic in fiction". Helen never speaks in the book; according to Victoria Margree and Bryony Randall in Victorian Gothic: An Edinburgh Companion, "The silence of the central female character is part of the text's misogyny, but also part of its narrative effect." Margree and Randall also view Helen's fate as a punishment for her sexual impropriety. Dennis Denisoff connects Machen's tendency to make his empowered female characters "sexually monstrous" to his criticisms of authors who discussed the subject of women's rights. James Machin defends Machen and The Great God Pan from charges from misogyny on the grounds that the male protagonist of Machen's story "The Novel of the White Powder" (1895) disintegrates in a manner reminiscent of Helen Vaughan and on the grounds that Machen married Amy Hogg, a woman who defied the sexual boundaries of her time.

== Adaptations ==
A pair of parodies of Pan were published in 1895 – Arthur Rickett's "A Yellow Creeper" and Arthur Sykes's "The Great Pan-Demon". Both suggest that Machen is an author of "limited imagination", with the latter depicting him as a mad scientist unleashing degenerate literature on an unsuspecting public. The Great God Pan was brought to the stage in 2008 by the WildClaw Theatre Company in Chicago. It was adapted and directed by WildClaw artistic director Charley Sherman. The novella Helen's Story (2013) by Rosanne Rabinowitz retells the story of The Great God Pan from Helen Vaughan's point of view. Helen's Story was written from a feminist perspective and nominated for a Shirley Jackson Award. The Great God Pan was adapted into a chamber opera by composer Ross Crean. Unusually for a composer, Crean wrote the opera's libretto himself. A recording of the work was released in 2017. The production saw its world premiere by Chicago Fringe Opera in 2018. According to the Chicago Tribune's John von Rhein, Chicago Fringe Opera's staging of The Great God Pan portrays Helen Vaughan as both a symbol of gender equality and an evil femme fatale.

== Legacy ==
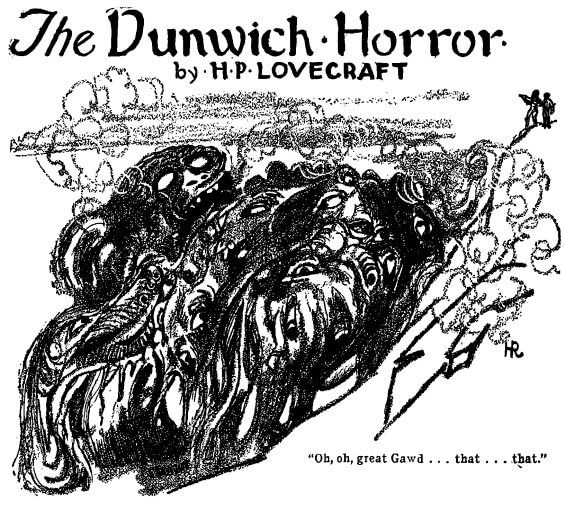
The Great God Pan influenced later works of horror fiction, including "The Dunwich Horror" (1929) by H. P. Lovecraft.

Black Gate's Matthew David Surridge said that The Great God Pan influenced Bram Stoker's Dracula (1897) as both works feature "an introductory sequence featuring a horrified Englishman in a non-English setting; then a variety of seemingly-unconnected events in London, the metropole at the heart of Empire; then the discovery that all those events are in fact inspired by one malign and supernatural intelligence, that the rational contemporary capital is threatened by the irrational and archaic; then an equivocal conclusion. The fear of sex, women, foreignness." John C. Tibbetts notes that both Helen Vaughan in The Great God Pan and Lucy Westenra in Dracula are "demon women of voracious and malignant sexuality". Theodora Goss also notes similarities between the death of Helen Vaughan in Machen's novella and Lucy's death in Dracula. Tibbetts also notes that Machen's portrayal of Helen Vaughan as demonic and hyper-sexual may have influenced a similar character, The Woman of Songs, in Richard Marsh's The Beetle (1897).

The Great God Pan was highly influential on the circle of writers around H. P. Lovecraft. The structure of Machen's story influenced the structure of Lovecraft's "The Call of Cthulhu" (1928). Pan's depiction of a monstrous half-human hybrid inspired the plot of Lovecraft's "The Dunwich Horror" (1929), which refers to Machen's novella by name. According to Lovecraft scholar Robert M. Price, "'The Dunwich Horror' is in every sense an homage to Machen and even a pastiche. There is little in Lovecraft's wonderful story that does not come directly out of Machen's fiction." Pan also inspired Lovecraft to create his character Nodens, who appears most prominently in The Dream-Quest of Unknown Kadath (1943).

Clark Ashton Smith was inspired by The Great God Pan to write his story "The Nameless Offspring" (1931), which also features a monstrous child born of a human and a supernatural entity. It has been suggested that Michael Arlen's novel Hell! Said the Duchess (1934) is a parody of The Great God Pan, as Arlen was influenced by Machen's work. The Great God Pan influenced Peter Straub's novel Ghost Story (1979) in its depiction of a shapeshifting monster who terrifies those it encounters. Straub himself frequently credited The Great God Pan as having been a major influence on his work.

According to film historians Keith McDonald and Roger Clark, Mexican film director Guillermo del Toro's portrayal of the faun in his 2006 dark fantasy film Pan's Labyrinth was inspired by the "ambivalent and possibly dangerous" portrayals of Pan in late Victorian and early Edwardian novels, including Machen's The Great God Pan and Pan's Garden (1912) by Algernon Blackwood. Del Toro deliberately chose to imitate the darker, more sinister fauns of Machen and Blackwood rather than the "sweetly domesticated figure" of Mr. Tumnus from C. S. Lewis's The Lion, the Witch and the Wardrobe (1950). The original title of the film in Spanish is El Laberinto del Fauno (The Labyrinth of the Faun), but the English title Pan's Labyrinth emphasizes the connection between del Toro's film and the body of late nineteenth-century writings about Pan, including The Great God Pan.

Stephen King wrote that his novella N. from his story collection Just After Sunset (2008) is "a riff on Arthur Machen's The Great God Pan. ... Mine isn't anywhere near [as] good [as the original], but I loved the chance to put neurotic behavior—obsessive/compulsive disorder—together with the idea of a monster-filled macroverse." King has also cited Machen's novella as an influence on his novel Revival (2014). Similar to Pan, Revival features an experiment on a young woman's brain which allows her to see into another world. Josh Malerman said The Great God Pan partly inspired his novel Bird Box (2014).

== See also ==
- Pan in popular culture

== Bibliography ==
- Boyiopoulos, Kostas (2010), "'Esoteric Elements': The Judeo-Christian Scheme in Arthur Machen's The Great God Pan", Neophilologus, 94 (2): 363–374, doi:10.1007/s11061-009-9186-4, S2CID 170779194
- Cardin, Matt, ed. (2017), Horror Literature through History: An Encyclopedia of the Stories that Speak to Our Deepest Fears: Volume 1, Santa Barbara, California: Greenwood, ISBN 978-1-4408-4756-1
- Denisoff, Dennis, ed. (2018), Decadent and Occult Works by Arthur Machen, Introduction and notes by Dennis Denisoff, Cambridge, England: The Modern Humanities Research Association, ISBN 978-1-78188-216-0
- Goho, James (2014), Journeys into Darkness: Critical Essays on Gothic Horror, Lanham, Maryland: Rowman & Littlefield, ISBN 978-1-4422-3146-7
- Luckhurst, Roger (2005), Late Victorian Gothic Tales, Oxford World's Classics, Oxford: Oxford University Press, ISBN 978-0-199-53887-4
- Machen, Arthur (1922), Far Off Things, New York: Alfred A. Knopf
- Machen, Arthur (2006), The Great God Pan and the Hill of Dreams, Mineola, New York: Dover Publications, ISBN 978-0-486-44345-4
- Machen, Arthur (2018), The Great God Pan and Other Horror Stories, Oxford: Oxford University Press, ISBN 978-0-19-881316-3
- Machin, James (2018), Weird Fiction in Britain 1880–1939, Cham, Switzerland: Palgrave Gothic, ISBN 978-3-319-90526-6
- McDonald, Keith; Clark, Roger (2014), Guillermo Del Toro: Film as Alchemic Art, New York: Bloomsbury Publishing, ISBN 978-1-4411-2449-4
- Smith, Andrew; Hughes, William (2012), Victorian Gothic: An Edinburgh Companion, Edinburgh: Edinburgh University Press, ISBN 978-0-7486-5497-0
- Tibbetts, John C. (2016), The Gothic Worlds of Peter Straub, Jefferson, North Carolina: McFarland & Company, ISBN 978-1-4766-2733-5
- Tyson, Donald (2016), The 13 Gates of the Necronomicon: A Workbook of Magic, Woodbury, Minnesota: Llewellyn Publications, ISBN 978-0738726298
