= Paul-Jean Toulet =

French writer

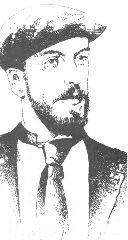
Paul-Jean Toulet

Paul-Jean Toulet (5 June 1867, Pau, Pyrénées-Atlantiques - 7 September 1920) was a French poet, novelist and feuilleton writer.

== Life and works ==
Paul-Jean Toulet was the son of a wealthy sugar planter, originally from Pau but living in Mauritius. He was most famous for his acerbic wit, his addiction to opium, and his friendship with Maurice Sailland - the "prince of gastronomes".

As a writer, Toulet is best known for Les Contrerimes, poems written in a verse form of his own invention, the rhyme scheme ABBA, with the lines alternating long, short, long, short. The collection was published posthumously, although many of the poems appeared in various literary magazines, either in earlier versions or finished forms (Toulet was an inveterate polisher of his verse).

His novels are almost unread today, with the possible exception of Mon amie Nane, a sort of fin-de-siècle equivalent to Pride and Prejudice, or even Bridget Jones' Diary.

Toulet became a model or an inspiration to the fantaisiste poetic movement from 1911 until the Great War. This explains the following comment made on the reception of his works: "When two men who have read Paul-Jean Toulet meet (usually in a bar), they immediately imagine it's a certain form of aristocracy".

In 1897, Toulet received a copy of The Great God Pan by Arthur Machen from a friend and he translated it the following year, as Le Grand Dieu Pan. It was published in La Plume in 1901 but went unnoticed except for Maeterlinck's reaction "...combining the traditional and scientific fantastic genres, it hits both our memories and hopes". Toulet engaged a correspondence with Machen and visited him in London.

Toulet's own novel Monsieur de Paur, homme public was inspired by Machen. Published in 1898 by Simonis Empis, it saw little success. In 1918, however, it was published again by the Éditions du Divan. This publishing company was owned by Toulet's admirer Henri Martineau, who also engaged in a correspondence with the author.

Toulet died in Guéthary, Aquitaine, in September 1920.

Several of his poems were set to music by Maurice Jaubert.
