= Revival (novel) =

2014 novel by Stephen King

- First edition cover
- Author: Stephen King
- Language: English
- Genre: Horror
- Published: November 11, 2014
- Publisher: Scribner
- Publication place: United States
- Media type: Print (Hardcover and paperback)
- Pages: 405
- ISBN: 978-1476770383

Revival is a horror novel by American writer Stephen King, published on November 11, 2014, by Scribner. It tells the story of a former minister who becomes obsessed with electricity, and a man who knew him as a child.

== Background information ==
The novel was first mentioned by King on June 20, 2013, while doing a video chat with fans as part of promoting the then-upcoming Under the Dome TV series. During the chat King stated that he was halfway through writing his next novel, Revival. The novel was officially announced on February 12, 2014. An excerpt was included at the end of the paperback edition of King's Doctor Sleep, published on June 10, 2014 (ISBN 978-1451698855). In an interview with Rolling Stone, King stated that Revival was inspired by Arthur Machen's The Great God Pan and Mary Shelley's Frankenstein, and, like several of King's preceding novels, he has had the idea for this novel since childhood.

== Plot ==
Charles Jacobs, a new Methodist minister, arrives in Harlow, Maine, thrilling the young Jamie Morton. The townsfolk embrace Jacobs, his wife Patsy, and their young son Morrie. During weekly Ministry Youth Fellowship sessions, Jacobs shares his interest in electricity. When Jamie's older brother Conrad ("Con") is left mute by a skiing accident, Jacobs restores his speech with a low-voltage belt that jumpstarts the nerves in his neck, amazing everyone. Patsy and Morrie die in a gruesome car accident. Stricken with grief and the problem of evil, Jacobs denounces God during a sermon and is banished from town. Before leaving, he tells a devastated Jamie that Con's recovery was merely a placebo effect.

Jamie grows up to become a musician. After a motorcycle accident, he becomes addicted to painkillers and then heroin. Abandoned by his band in Tulsa, Oklahoma, he goes to a state fair and finds Jacobs performing an act called "Portraits in Lightning," in which he creates photographs of volunteers out of electricity. Jacobs recognizes Jamie and treats his addiction and broken leg with electrotherapy. Jamie soon experiences side effects, including sleepwalking and stabbing himself as if trying to inject heroin. Cathy Morse, one of Jacobs's portrait subjects, begins shoplifting, driving her enraged father to assault Jacobs. Before Jacobs leaves town, he sends Jamie to Hugh Yates in Denver for a job in a recording studio.

Years later, Yates and Jamie learn that Jacobs is touring as a faith healer, marketing his use of electricity as a divine power. Yates reveals that Jacobs once cured his deafness. At one of Jacobs' meetings, Yates flees upon having a "prismatic" vision in which the congregation appears as giant ants. Jamie investigates other people Jacobs has healed and finds a pattern of side effects; some, including Cathy, have committed suicide or murder. He also learns that Jacobs has studied occult texts such as De Vermis Mysteriis. Jamie confronts Jacobs, who admits to the side effects but insists they are rare and claims he has stopped healing. Jacobs offers to make Jamie his assistant, but he refuses.

Later, Jacobs contacts Jamie with a letter from Jamie's childhood sweetheart Astrid, claiming she has cancer. Jacobs will heal her only if Jamie assists in one last experiment. Jamie reluctantly agrees, and Astrid is cured. The experiment involves "secret electricity," an all-powerful force he has been using to achieve his healings for years. He intends to channel a massive surge of this energy into the terminally ill Mary Fay after she is clinically dead, hoping she will be able to describe the afterlife upon her return. The revival succeeds, but Mary reveals no Heaven. Instead, she becomes a doorway to the "Null", a chaotic, hellish dimension where the dead are tormented by ant-like servants of insane Lovecraftian beings, chief among them a being called "Mother". Mother possesses Mary's corpse, transforming her into a grotesque monster, and attacks Jacobs. Jamie shoots Mother with Jacobs' gun, and she leaves Mary's body. Jacobs suffers a fatal stroke, and Jamie arranges his body to make it look like he shot Mary. Jamie flees to Hawaii, where Con lives.

Eventually, many of Jacobs's former patients, including Yates and Astrid, go insane and kill themselves and others. Jamie, one of the few survivors, lives in Kauaʻi on antidepressants, and is feeling nihilistic. He recounts his vision of the Null to a skeptical psychiatrist and clings to the hope that his visions were lies. Visiting Con, now institutionalized after attacking his partner, Jamie sees a door calling his name and understands that he too will one day be trapped in the Null under the yoke of Mother.

== Reception ==
Revival generally received positive reviews, with many critics noting the book's nods to classics of the horror genre, such as Mary Shelley's Frankenstein, Arthur Machen's The Great God Pan, and the cosmic-horror of H. P. Lovecraft.

Danielle Trussoni of The New York Times described Revival as "pure Stephen King ... reading Revival is experiencing a master storyteller having the time of his life." Trussoni noted that the book "is filled with cultural allusions both high and low: In addition to the Bible and Frankenstein, there are references to Thomas Edison's work at Menlo Park, Dan Brown, The X-Files, the Forbidden Books (that is, grimoires banned and burned by the Catholic Church) ... As the Kingian references pile up, and become layered into the events of the fictional world, you fall deeper and deeper under the story's spell, almost believing that Jamie's nightmarish experiences actually happened."

Elizabeth Hand, writing in The Washington Post also highlights Revival's influences: "King's restrained prose explodes in an ending that combines contemporary realism with cosmic horror reminiscent of H. P. Lovecraft's fiction and the classic film Quatermass and the Pit. The tormented relationship between Jamie Morton and Charles Jacobs takes on the funereal shading of an Arthur Miller tragedy." King's storytelling is praised as offering "the atavistic pleasure of drawing closer to a campfire in the dark to hear a tale recounted by someone who knows exactly how to make every listener's flesh crawl when he whispers, 'Don't look behind you.'"

Other reviews were less enthusiastic, with The Guardian's Ben East describing Revival's ending as "a bit odd." East praises the story's beginning, but opined that "Revival takes a turn for the ridiculous" after moving past the protagonist's childhood. "In the context of a novel with so many interesting things to say about growing up and growing old in the 21st century, the more fantastical elements feel a little silly."

Tasha Robinson, writing for The A.V. Club, offered a similar criticism: "Virtually all of Revival is a slow build that sometimes feels suspiciously like a shaggy-dog story, one which may not have a punchline. ... Revival could have trimmed all the buildup and instead been an extremely unnerving short story. King's fans, familiar with his sprawling voice and comfortably compelling style, may be perfectly content to hang out with him on this leisurely stroll toward eventual horror."

== Film adaptation ==
On February 2, 2016, it was announced that an adaptation for Revival was written by Josh Boone while he was working on adapting The Stand. The script was being looked at by Universal Pictures and would be shopped around if the producers refused it. In December 2016, Boone announced that Russell Crowe was attached to star in the film.

On May 8, 2020, Deadline Hollywood confirmed that Mike Flanagan would adapt Revival for film in partnership with Intrepid Pictures. That July, Flanagan confirmed that he had completed the first draft of the screenplay, which was met with King's approval. However, he expressed doubt as to the likelihood of Warner Bros. greenlighting the project. On December 23, 2020, Flanagan confirmed that the adaptation was no longer in development, saying in conversation with Boone on the podcast The Company of the Mad, "I stepped on the exact same landmine, and ended up in the exact same place... We should get together some day and share boards, and drafts, and scars. I kind of hit the same wall with it where it was just so expensive. Man, did I love it, though."
