= The Three Impostors =

1895 novel by Arthur Machen

The Three Impostors; or, The Transmutations
- Author: Arthur Machen
- Language: English
- Genre: Horror
- Publisher: The Bodley Head
- Publication date: 1895
- Publication place: United Kingdom
- Media type: Print (hardcover)
- Pages: 215

The Three Impostors; or, The Transmutations is an episodic horror novel by Welsh writer Arthur Machen, first published in 1895 in The Bodley Head's Keynotes Series. It was revived in paperback by Ballantine Books as the forty-eighth volume of the Ballantine Adult Fantasy series in June 1972.

== Contents ==
- Prologue
- Adventure of the Gold Tiberius
- The Encounter of the Pavement
  - Novel of the Dark Valley
- Adventure of the Missing Brother
  - Novel of the Black Seal
- Incident of the Private Bar
- The Decorative Imagination
  - Novel of the Iron Maid
- The Recluse of Bayswater
  - Novel of the White Powder
- Strange Occurrence in Clerkenwell
  - History of the Young Man with Spectacles
- Adventure of the Deserted Residence

=== Synopsis ===
The novel comprises several weird tales and culminates in a denouement of deadly horror, connected with a secret society devoted to debauched pagan rituals. The three impostors of the title are members of this society who weave a web of deception in the streets of London, relating the aforementioned weird tales in the process. They search for a missing Roman coin commemorating an infamous orgy by the Emperor Tiberius and close in on their prey: "the young man with spectacles".

=== Censorship ===
Publisher John Lane of The Bodley Head, wary of the atmosphere following the trial of Oscar Wilde, asked Machen to expurgate his manuscript; Machen refused. Ultimately, however, Machen agreed to revise the description of the final scene of the book, in order to purge one word that Lane had found to be too explicit; the word was entrails.

== Influence ==
The short story "No-Man's Land" (1899) by John Buchan has a similar plot to "The Novel of the Black Seal". In both stories a traveller in a remote area encounters a malevolent race of "little people". Buchan was familiar with Machen's writings, suggesting that Machen's story may have been an influence on Buchan's.

At least two of the novel's tales, "The Novel of the Black Seal" and "The Novel of the White Powder", influenced the work of H. P. Lovecraft. In his survey Supernatural Horror in Literature, Lovecraft suggested that these stories "perhaps represent the highwater mark of Machen's skill as a terror-weaver".

"The Novel of the Black Seal" was a model for some of Lovecraft's best-known stories: "The Call of Cthulhu", "The Dunwich Horror", and "The Whisperer in Darkness". The story also bears strong resemblance to Lovecraft's story "The Lurking Fear", which tells of a deformed humanoid race living in a rural region of the Catskill Mountains. "The Novel of the White Powder", which Lovecraft said "approaches the absolute culmination of loathsome fright", is pointed to as an inspiration for Lovecraft's stories of bodily disintegration, such as "Cool Air" and "The Colour Out of Space".

Two of Robert E. Howard's stories, Worms of the Earth (1932) and The Little People (1970) were also influenced by "The Novel of the Black Seal".

The story "R_{x}… Death!" in issue 20 of Tales from the Crypt is an adaptation of "The Novel of the White Powder", except the poisonous "medicine" contains digestive enzymes rather than a witch's brew.

== Machen's later reflections on the novel ==
Partly in response to criticism of the Stevensonian style of the book, Machen altered his approach in writing his next book, The Hill of Dreams. Following the death of his first wife in 1899, Machen developed a greater interest in the occult, joining the Hermetic Order of the Golden Dawn. He noted that a number of events in his life seemed to mirror events in The Three Impostors, most notably a conflict in the order between William Butler Yeats (a "young man with spectacles") and Aleister Crowley, which reached its height around this time. (These experiences are reflected on in Alan Moore's Snakes and Ladders.)

In Things Near and Far (1923) Machen wrote:

It was in the early spring of 1894 that I set about the writing of the said "Three Impostors," a book which testifies to the vast respect I entertained for the fantastic, "New Arabian Nights" manner of R. L. Stevenson, to those curious researches in the byways of London which I have described already, and also, I hope, to a certain originality of experiment in the tale of terror.

== Anthologization ==
Two of the stories in The Three Impostors, "The Novel of the Black Seal" and "The Novel of the White Powder", have often been anthologized as individual stories. "The Novel of the White Powder" was first anthologized in More Ghosts and Marvels: A Selection of Uncanny Tales from Walter Scott to Michael Arlen (1927), edited by V. H. Collins. "The Novel of the Black Seal" was first anthologized in Great Short Stories of Detection, Mystery and Horror (1928), edited by Dorothy L. Sayers.

== Sources ==
- Bleiler, Everett (1948). The Checklist of Fantastic Literature. Chicago: Shasta Publishers. p. 188.
- Lovecraft, H. P. (1973) [1945]. Supernatural Horror in Literature. New York: Dover Publications. ISBN 0-486-20105-8.
- Machen, Arthur (2007). The Three Impostors. Mineola, New York: Dover Publications. ISBN 978-0-486-46052-9.
