= Arthur Machen =

Welsh author and mystic (1863–1947)

- Machen c. 1905
- Born: Arthur Llewellyn Jones; 3 March 1863; Caerleon, Monmouthshire, Wales
- Died: 15 December 1947 (aged 84); Beaconsfield, Buckinghamshire, England
- Occupations: Short story writer, novelist, journalist, actor
- Writing career
- Genres: Horror, fantasy, supernatural fiction, weird fiction
- Notable works: The Great God Pan, The Three Impostors, "The White People", The Hill of Dreams

Arthur Llewellyn Jones (3 March 1863 – 15 December 1947), known by his pen name Arthur Machen (/ˈmækən/ or /ˈmæxən/), was a Welsh author and mystic of the late 19th and early 20th centuries. He is best known for his influential supernatural, fantasy and horror fiction. His novella The Great God Pan (1890; 1894) has garnered a reputation as a classic of horror; Stephen King described it as "Maybe the best [horror story] in the English language." He is also known for "The Bowmen", a short story that was widely read as fact, creating the legend of the Angels of Mons.

== Biography ==
=== Early years ===
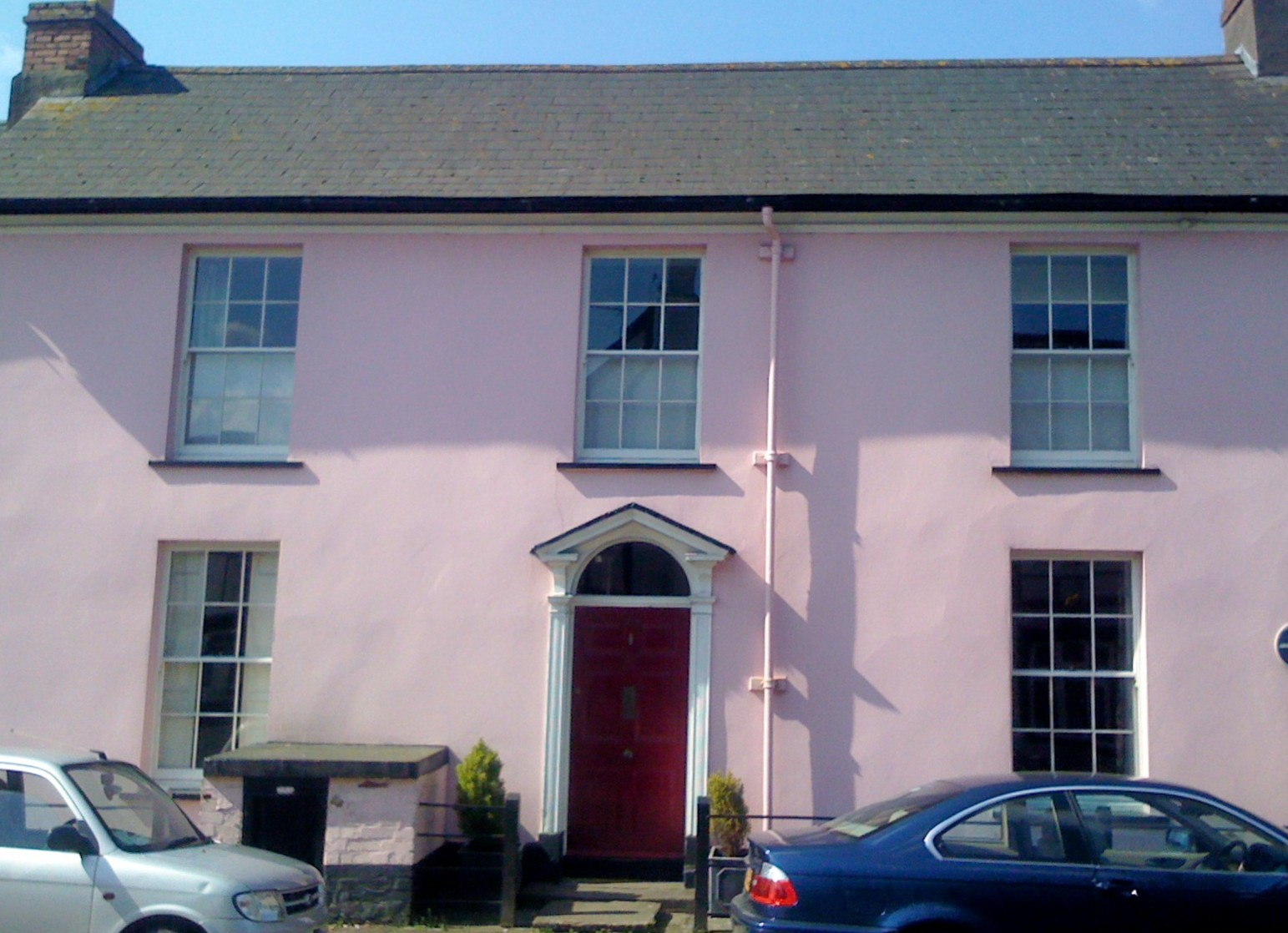
Machen's birthplace at 33 High Street, The Square, Caerleon

Machen was born Arthur Llewelyn Jones in Caerleon, Monmouthshire. The house of his birth, opposite the Olde Bull Inn in The Square at Caerleon is marked with a commemorative blue plaque. The landscape of Monmouthshire (which he usually referred to by the name of the medieval Welsh kingdom, Gwent), with its associations of Celtic, Roman, and medieval history, made a powerful impression on him, and his love of it is at the heart of many of his works.

The Rectory, Llanddewi Fach—Machen's childhood home

Machen was descended from a long line of clergymen, the family having originated in Carmarthenshire. In 1864, when Machen was two, his father, John Edward Jones, became rector of the parish of Llanddewi Fach with Llandegveth, about five miles north of Caerleon, and Machen was brought up at the rectory there. Jones had adopted his wife's maiden name, Machen, to inherit a legacy, legally becoming "Jones-Machen"; his son later used a shortened version, Arthur Machen, as a pen name.

The Welsh historian and folklorist Fred Hando suggests Machen's early interest in the occult came from an article on alchemy in a volume of Household Words in his father's library. Hando recounts Machen's other early reading:

He bought De Quincey's Confessions of an English Opium-Eater at Pontypool Road Railway Station, The Arabian Nights at Hereford Railway Station, and borrowed Don Quixote from Mrs. Gwyn, of Llanfrechfa Rectory. In his father's library he found also the Waverley novels, a three-volume edition of the Glossary of Gothic Architecture, and an early volume of Tennyson.

At the age of eleven, Machen boarded at Hereford Cathedral School, where he received a good education. His family could not afford for him to attend university, and Machen went to London, where he sat, but failed, exams for entrance to medical school. He displayed some literary promise and in 1881 published a long poem on the subject of the Eleusinian Mysteries. He attempted to make a living as a journalist, a publisher's clerk, and a children's tutor, devoting his evenings to writing and solitary walks.

In 1884 he published his second work, the pastiche The Anatomy of Tobacco, and secured work with the publisher and bookseller George Redway as a cataloguer and magazine editor. This led to further work as a translator from French, translating the Heptaméron of Marguerite de Navarre, Le Moyen de Parvenir (Fantastic Tales) of Béroalde de Verville, and the Memoirs of Giacomo Casanova.

In 1887, the year his father died, Machen married Amelia (Amy) Hogg, an unconventional music teacher with a passion for the theatre, who had literary friends in London's bohemian circles. Hogg had introduced Machen to the writer and occultist A. E. Waite, who was to become one of Machen's closest friends. Machen also made the acquaintance of other literary figures, such as M. P. Shiel and Edgar Jepson. Soon after his marriage, Machen began to receive a series of legacies from Scottish relatives that allowed him to gradually devote more time to writing.

=== Literary decadence in the 1890s ===
Around 1890 Machen began to publish in literary magazines, writing stories influenced by the works of Robert Louis Stevenson, some of which used gothic or fantastic themes. This led to his first major success, The Great God Pan. It was published in 1894 by John Lane in the noted Keynotes Series, which was part of the growing aesthetic movement of the time. Machen's story was widely denounced for its sexual and horrific content and consequently sold well, going into a second edition.

Machen next produced The Three Impostors, a novel composed of a number of interwoven tales, in 1895. The novel and the stories within it were eventually to be regarded as among Machen's best works. However, following the scandal surrounding Oscar Wilde later that year, Machen's association with works of decadent horror made it difficult for him to find a publisher for new works. Thus, though he would write some of his most highly regarded works over the next few years, some were published much later. These included The Hill of Dreams, Hieroglyphics, A Fragment of Life, the story "The White People", and the stories which make up Ornaments in Jade.

=== Tragedy and acting: 1899–1910 ===
In 1899 Machen's wife, Amy, died of cancer after a long period of illness. This had a devastating effect on Machen. He only gradually recovered from his loss over the next year, partially through his close friendship with Waite. It was through Waite's influence that Machen joined at this time the Hermetic Order of the Golden Dawn, though Machen's interest in the organisation was not lasting or very deep.

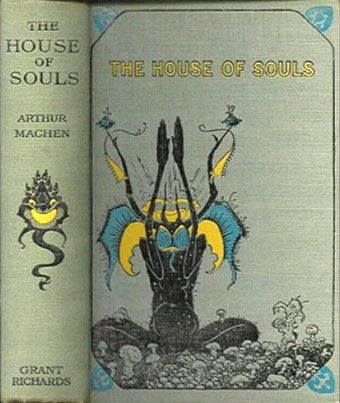
The House of Souls (London: Grant Richards, 1906), with cover designs by Sidney Sime

Machen's recovery was further helped by his sudden change of career, becoming an actor in 1901 and a member of Frank Benson's company of travelling players, a profession which took him round the country.

This led in 1903 to a second marriage, to Dorothie Purefoy Hudleston, which brought Machen much happiness. Machen managed to find a publisher in 1902 for his earlier written work Hieroglyphics, an analysis of the nature of literature, which concluded that true literature must convey "ecstasy". In 1906 Machen's literary career began once more to flourish as the book The House of Souls collected his most notable works of the nineties and brought them to a new audience. He also published a satirical work, Dr Stiggins: His Views and Principles, generally considered one of his weakest works.

Machen also was at this time investigating Celtic Christianity, the Holy Grail and King Arthur. Publishing his views in Lord Alfred Douglas's The Academy, for which he wrote regularly, Machen concluded that the legends of the Grail actually were based on dim recollections of the rites of the Celtic Church. These ideas also featured strongly in the novel The Secret Glory which he wrote at this time, marking the first use in fiction of the idea of the Grail's surviving into modern times in some form, an idea much utilised ever since, as by Charles Williams (War in Heaven), Dan Brown (The Da Vinci Code) and George Lucas (Indiana Jones and the Last Crusade). In 1907 The Hill of Dreams, generally considered Machen's masterpiece, was finally published, though it was not recognised much at the time.

The next few years saw Machen continue with acting in various companies and with journalistic work, but he was finding it increasingly hard to earn a living and his legacies were long exhausted. Machen was also attending literary gatherings such as the New Bohemians and the Square Club.

=== Journalism and the Great War: 1910–1921 ===
Finally Machen accepted a full-time journalist's job at Alfred Harmsworth's Evening News in 1910. In February 1912 his son Hilary was born, followed by a daughter, Janet, in 1917. The coming of the First World War in 1914 saw Machen return to public prominence for the first time in twenty years due to the publication of "The Bowmen" and the subsequent publicity surrounding the "Angels of Mons" episode. He published a series of stories capitalising on this success, most of which were morale-boosting propaganda, but the most notable, "The Great Return" (1915) and the novella The Terror (1917), were more accomplished. He also published a series of autobiographical articles during the war, later reprinted in book form as Far Off Things. During the war years Machen also met and championed the work of Caradoc Evans.

Machen generally disliked work at the newspaper, and it was only the need to earn money for his family which kept him at it. The money came in useful, allowing him to move in 1919 to a bigger house with a garden, in St John's Wood, which became a noted location for literary gatherings attended by friends such as the painter Augustus John, D. B. Wyndham Lewis, and Jerome K. Jerome. Machen's dismissal from the Evening News in 1921 came as a relief in one sense, though it caused financial problems. Machen, however, was recognised as a great Fleet Street character by his contemporaries, and he remained in demand as an essayist for much of the twenties.

=== The Machen boom of the 1920s ===
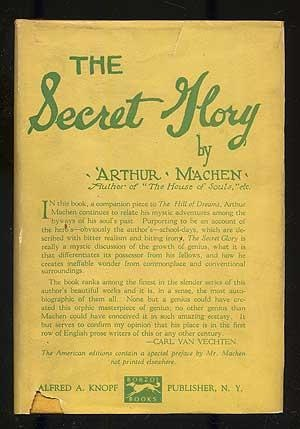
Cover of the American edition of The Secret Glory (New York: Knopf, 1922), one of the series of Machen's works published by Alfred A. Knopf in the 1920s

The year 1922 saw a revival in Machen's literary fortunes. The Secret Glory, considered by some to be Machen's final masterpiece, was belatedly published, as well as the autobiographical Far Off Things and new editions of his Casanova translation, The House of Souls and The Hill of Dreams. Machen's works had now found a new audience and publishers in the United States, and a series of requests for republications of books started to come in. Vincent Starrett, James Branch Cabell and Carl Van Vechten were American devotees who helped in this process.

Another sign of his rising fortunes was the publication in 1923 of a collected edition of his works (the "Caerleon Edition") and a bibliography. That year also saw the publication of a recently completed second volume of autobiography, Things Near and Far—the third and final volume, The London Adventure, being published in 1924. Machen's earlier works suddenly started becoming much-sought-after collector's items at this time, a position they have held ever since. In 1924 he issued a collection of bad reviews of his own work, with very little commentary, under the title Precious Balms. In this period of prosperity Machen's home saw many visitors and social gatherings, and Machen made new friends, such as Oliver Stonor.

=== Final years: 1926–1947 ===
By 1926 the boom in republication was mostly over, and Machen's income dropped. He continued republishing earlier works in collected editions, as well as writing essays and articles for various magazines and newspapers and contributing forewords and introductions to both his own works and those of other writers—such as the Monmouthshire historian Fred Hando's The Pleasant Land of Gwent (1944)—but produced little new fiction. In 1927 he became a manuscript reader for the publisher Ernest Benn, which brought in a much-needed regular income until 1933.

In 1929 Machen and his family moved away from London to Amersham in Buckinghamshire, but they still faced financial hardship. He received some recognition for his literary work when he received a Civil List pension of £100 per annum in 1932, but the loss of work from Benn's a year later made things difficult once more. A few more collections of Machen's shorter works were published in the thirties, partially as a result of the championing of Machen by John Gawsworth, who also began work on a biography of Machen that was only published in 2005 thanks to the Friends of Arthur Machen.

Machen's financial difficulties were only finally ended by the literary appeal launched in 1943 for his eightieth birthday. The initial names on the appeal show the general recognition of Machen's stature as a distinguished man of letters, as they included Max Beerbohm, T. S. Eliot, George Bernard Shaw, Walter de la Mare, Algernon Blackwood and John Masefield. The success of the appeal allowed Machen to live the last few years of his life, until 1947, in relative comfort.

== Views ==
=== Spiritual ===
From the beginning of his literary career, Machen espoused a mystical belief that the humdrum ordinary world hid a more mysterious and strange world beyond. His gothic and decadent works of the 1890s concluded that the lifting of this veil could lead to madness, sex or death, and usually a combination of all three. Machen's later works became somewhat less obviously full of gothic trappings, but for him investigations into mysteries invariably resulted in life-changing transformation and sacrifice. Machen loved the medieval worldview because he felt it manifested deep spirituality alongside a rambunctious earthiness.

Machen was an enthusiast for literature that expressed the "rapture, beauty, adoration, wonder, awe, mystery, sense of the unknown, desire for the unknown" that he summed up in the word ecstasy. His main passions were for writers and writing he felt achieved this, an idiosyncratic list which included the Mabinogion and other medieval romances, François Rabelais, Miguel de Cervantes, William Shakespeare, Samuel Johnson, Thomas de Quincey, Charles Dickens, Arthur Conan Doyle, Edgar Allan Poe and Robert Louis Stevenson. Works in which ecstasy was absent, "in spite of all the cleverness, all the talents, all the workmanship and observation and dexterity”, could not be fine literature to Machen.

Machen's strong opposition to a materialistic viewpoint is obvious in many of his works, marking him as part of neo-romanticism. He was deeply suspicious of science, materialism, commerce, and Puritanism, all of which were anathema to Machen's conservative, bohemian, mystical, and ritualistic temperament. Machen's virulent satirical streak against things he disliked has been regarded as a weakness in his work, and rather dating, especially when it comes to the fore in works such as Dr Stiggins. Similarly, some of his propagandistic First World War stories also have little appeal to a modern audience.

Machen, brought up as the son of a Church of England clergyman, always held Christian beliefs, though accompanied by a fascination with sensual mysticism; his interests in paganism and the occult were especially prominent in his earliest works. Machen was well read on such matters as alchemy, the kabbalah, and Hermeticism, and these occult interests formed part of his close friendship with Waite. Machen, however, was always very down-to-earth, requiring substantial proof that a supernatural event had occurred, and was thus highly sceptical of Spiritualism.

The death of his first wife led him to a spiritual crossroads, and he experienced a series of mystical events. After his experimentation with the Hermetic Order of the Golden Dawn, the orthodox ritual of the Church became ever more important to him, gradually defining his position as a High Church Anglican who was able to incorporate elements from his own mystical experiences, Celtic Christianity, and readings in literature and legend into his thinking.

In his later years, Machen became a Roman Catholic.

=== Political ===
In response to a 1937 questionnaire on the Spanish Civil War in the Left Review, he stated: "Mr. Arthur Machen presents his compliments and begs to inform that he is, and always has been, entirely for General Franco."

== Legacy and influence ==
Machen's literary significance is substantial; his stories have been translated into many languages and reprinted in short story anthologies countless times. In the early 1970s, a paperback reprint of The Three Impostors in the Ballantine Adult Fantasy series brought him to the notice of a new generation. More recently, the small press has continued to keep Machen's work in print. In 2010, to mark the 150 years since Machen's birth, two volumes of Machen's work were republished in the prestigious Library of Wales series.

Literary critics such as Wesley D. Sweetser and S. T. Joshi see Machen's works as a significant part of the late Victorian revival of the gothic novel and the decadent movement of the 1890s, bearing direct comparison to the themes found in contemporary works like Robert Louis Stevenson's Strange Case of Dr Jekyll and Mr Hyde, Bram Stoker's Dracula, and Oscar Wilde's The Picture of Dorian Gray. At the time authors such as Wilde, William Butler Yeats and Arthur Conan Doyle were all admirers of Machen's works. He is also usually noted in the better studies of Anglo-Welsh literature. The French writer Paul-Jean Toulet translated Machen's The Great God Pan into French and visited Machen in London. Charles Williams was also a devotee of Machen's work, which inspired Williams' own fiction.

There is a blue plaque, at New Angel Hotel, New Quay Road, in Whitby, North Yorkshire, commemorating his stay there in November 1916.

=== Genre fiction ===
The science fiction writer Brian Stableford has suggested that Machen "was the first writer of authentically modern horror stories, and his best works must still be reckoned among the finest products of the genre".

Machen's popularity in 1920s America has been noted, and his work was an influence on the development of the pulp horror found in magazines like Weird Tales and on such notable fantasy writers as James Branch Cabell, Clark Ashton Smith, Robert E. Howard, Frank Belknap Long (who wrote a tribute to Machen in verse, "On Reading Arthur Machen"), Donald Wandrei, David Lindsay and E. Charles Vivian.

His significance was recognised by H. P. Lovecraft, who in his essay "Supernatural Horror in Literature" named Machen as one of the four "modern masters" of supernatural horror (with Algernon Blackwood, Lord Dunsany and M. R. James). Machen's influence on Lovecraft's own work was substantial. Lovecraft's reading of Machen in the early 1920s led him away from his earlier Dunsanian writing towards the development of what became the Cthulhu Mythos. Machen's use of a contemporary Welsh or London background in which sinister ancient horrors lurk and are capable of interbreeding with modern people helped to inspire Lovecraft's similar use of a New England background. Machen's story "The White People" includes references to curious unknown rites and beings, an idea Lovecraft uses frequently in the mythos.

Lovecraft pays tribute to the influence by directly incorporating some of Machen's creations and references, such as Nodens and Aklo, into his Cthulhu Mythos and using similar plot-lines, most notably seen by a comparison of "The Dunwich Horror" to The Great God Pan and of "The Whisperer in Darkness" to "The Novel of the Black Seal". Other Lovecraft tales with a debt or reference to Machen include "The Call of Cthulhu", "The Festival", "Cool Air", "The Descendant" and "The Colour Out of Space".

His intense, atmospheric stories of horror and the supernatural have been read and enjoyed by many modern horror and fantasy writers, influencing directly Peter Straub, Stephen King, Ramsey Campbell, Karl Edward Wagner, "Sarban" (John William Wall), Joanna Russ, Graham Joyce, Simon Clark, Tim Lebbon and T. E. D. Klein. Klein's novel The Ceremonies was partly based on Machen's "The White People", and Straub's novel Ghost Story was influenced by The Great God Pan.

=== Wider literary influence ===
Machen's influence is not limited to genre fiction, however. Jorge Luis Borges recognised Machen as a great writer, and through him Machen has had an influence on magic realism. He was also a major influence on Paul Bowles and Javier Marías, the latter of whom dedicated a subplot of his 1989 novel All Souls to collecting the works of Machen and his circle of peers. He was one of the most significant figures in the life of the Poet Laureate Sir John Betjeman, who attributed to Machen his conversion to High Church Anglicanism, an important part of his philosophy and poetry. Sylvia Townsend Warner (a niece of Machen's second wife, Purefoy) admired Machen and was influenced by him, as is his great-granddaughter, the contemporary artist Tessa Farmer.

Machen was also a pioneer in psychogeography, due to his interest in the interconnection between landscape and the mind. The wanderings in Wales and London that he recorded make him of great interest to writers on this subject, especially those focusing on London, such as Iain Sinclair and Peter Ackroyd. Alan Moore wrote an exploration of Machen's mystical experiences in his work Snakes and Ladders. Aleister Crowley loved Machen's works, feeling they contained "Magickal" truth, and put them on the reading list for his students, though Machen, who never met him, detested Crowley. Other occultists, such as Kenneth Grant, also find Machen an inspiration. Far closer to Machen's personal mystical world view was his effect on his friend Evelyn Underhill, who reflected some of Machen's thinking in her highly influential book Mysticism.

One chapter of the French best-seller The Morning of the Magicians, by L. Pauwels and J. Berger (1960), deals extensively with Machen's thought and works. Machen's approach to reality is described as an example of the "fantastic realism" which the book is dedicated to.

=== Other fields ===
In music, the composer John Ireland found Machen's works to be a life-changing experience that directly influenced much of his composition – specifically the piano piece The Scarlet Ceremonies (1912–13, founded on a quotation from "The White People"); the symphonic rhapsody Mai-Dun (1920–21, believed to have been inspired by The Hill of Dreams); and Legend for piano and orchestra (1933), which is dedicated to Machen.

Mark E. Smith of The Fall also found Machen an inspiration. Likewise, Current 93 have drawn on the mystical and occult leanings of Machen, with songs such as "The Inmost Light", which shares its title with Machen's story. Some artists on the Ghost Box Music label like Belbury Poly and The Focus Group draw heavily on Machen. It is an interest also shared by film directors like Mexican Rogelio A. González who made a successful version of "The Islington Mystery" as El Esqueleto de la señora Morales (1960), adapted by Luis Alcoriza, a frequent collaborator in Luis Buñuel's classic films. This interest in Machen's works among filmmakers is also shared by Guillermo del Toro and Richard Stanley. Other notable figures with an enthusiasm for Machen have included Brocard Sewell, Barry Humphries, Stewart Lee and Rowan Williams, Archbishop of Canterbury.

=== Literary societies ===
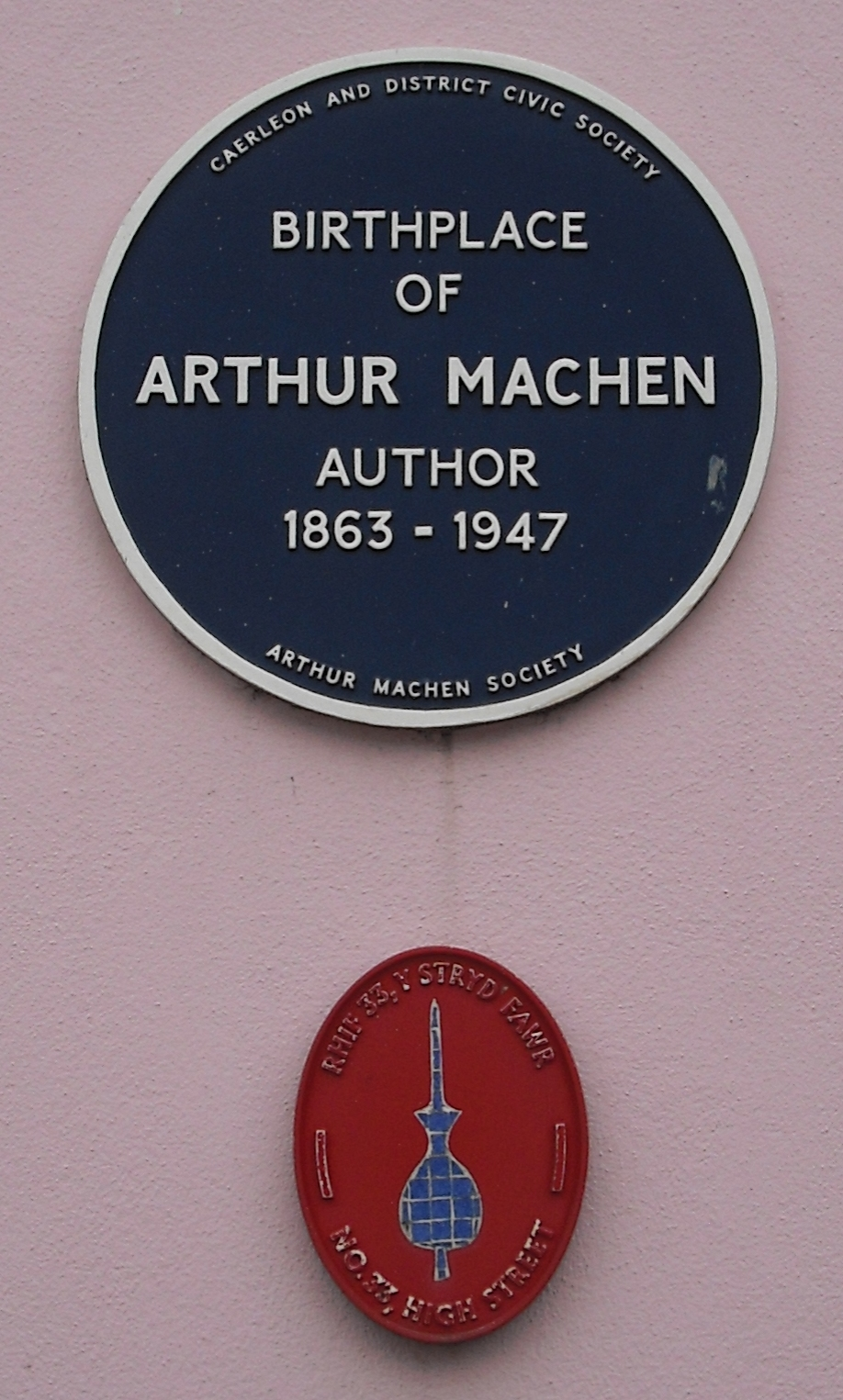
Blue plaque installed on Machen's birthplace in Caerleon in November 1997, under the auspices of the UK Arthur Machen Society

An Arthur Machen Society was established in 1948 in the United States and survived until the 1960s. It was followed by the Arthur Machen Society based in the UK, in 1986, which in turn was replaced by the current literary society, The Friends of Arthur Machen.

The Friends of Arthur Machen (FoAM) is a non-profit international literary society founded in 1998 dedicated to supporting interest in Machen and his work, and to aid research. It publishes two journals: Faunus, which reprints rare Machen articles and criticism of his work, and Machenalia. It fosters interest not only in Machen but in events in which he played a key part, such as the Angels of Mons affair, and organises psychogeographic excursions.

Prominent members include Alan Moore, Stewart Lee and R. B. Russell of Tartarus Press. The society was nominated for a World Fantasy Special Award: Non-Professional in 2006.

== Selected works ==
In approximate order of composition, with date of publication:

- The Chronicle of Clemendy (1888): fantasy tales within a frame story of a rural Welsh drinking fraternity with mystical roots.
- "The Lost Club" (1890): short story about a secret London society and its ritual disappearances of members.
- The Great God Pan (written 1890–1894; published 1894): short horror novel. First published together with "The Inmost Light" as Volume V in John Lane's Keynotes Series.
- "The Inmost Light" (1894): short horror story. A scientist imprisons his wife's soul in a shining jewel, letting something else into her untenanted body, but the jewel is stolen.
- "The Shining Pyramid" (1895): short horror story. Strange arrangements of stones appear at the edge of a young man's property. He and a friend attempt to decipher their meaning before it is too late.
- The Three Impostors (1895): horror novel incorporating several short stories, including "The Novel of the White Powder" and "The Novel of the Black Seal", which have often been anthologised separately. Centres on the search for a man with spectacles.
  - "The Novel of the Black Seal": a precursor of H. P. Lovecraft in its subject matter—the protagonist gradually uncovers the secrets of a hidden pre- and non-human race hiding in the Welsh hills, and the true nature of a hybrid, idiot child fathered by one of them.
  - "The Novel of the White Powder": a man's behaviour takes a strange turn after he starts taking a new prescription. His sister does not know if this is a good thing or a bad one.
- "The Red Hand" (1895): short detective/horror story featuring the main characters from The Three Impostors. It focuses on a murder performed with an ancient stone axe.
- The Hill of Dreams (written 1895–1897; published 1907): novel delineating the dark, mystical spiralling madness, awe, sensuality, horror and ecstasy of an artist. Generally considered Machen's masterpiece.
- Ornaments in Jade (written 1897; published 1924): prose poems, some of which hint at dark pagan powers.
- "The White People" (written 1899; published 1904): short horror story. Presented as a young girl's diary, detailing her increasingly deep delvings into witchcraft. Often described as one of the greatest of all horror short stories.
- Hieroglyphics: A Note upon Ecstasy in Literature (written 1899; published 1902): literary tract detailing Machen's philosophy of literature and its capacity for "ecstasy".
- A Fragment of Life (written 1899–1904; published 1904): short novel. A young couple repudiate the banalities of material life in favour of the spiritual.
- The House of the Hidden Light (Written in 1904 with Arthur Edward Waite. Only three copies were published. Reprinted in an edition of 350 copies by Tartarus Press, 2003): book of coded and mystical correspondence.
- The Secret Glory (written 1899–1908; published 1922): novel. A public-school boy becomes fascinated by tales of the Holy Grail and escapes from his repressive school in search of a deeper meaning to life.
- "The Bowmen" (1914): in this story, written and published during the First World War, the ghosts of archers from the battle of Agincourt, led by Saint George, come to the aid of British troops. This is cited as the origin of the Angels of Mons legend.
- "The Great Return" (1915): short story. The Holy Grail returns to a Welsh village.
- The Terror (1917): short horror novel. Rural supernatural horror set in wartime Britain, where a series of unexplained countryside murders occur with no sign of who or what is responsible.
- Far Off Things (1922): first volume of autobiography.
- Things Near and Far (1923): second volume of autobiography.
- "Out of the Earth" (1923): short horror story regarding the malefic brutality of the mythical "Little People", who are emulating World War I.
- The London Adventure (1924): third and final volume of autobiography.
- Dog and Duck (1924): essays.
- The Glorious Mystery (1924): essays and vignettes.
- The Canning Wonder (1925): non-fiction study of the eighteenth-century mystery of the disappearance of Elizabeth Canning. Machen concludes that Canning was lying about some or all of her exploits.
- Dreads and Drolls (1926): essays (expanded edition, Tartarus Press: 2007).
- Notes and Queries (1926): essays.
- Tom O'Bedlam and His Song (1930): essays.
- "Opening the Door" (1931): short story. Tale of a man's mysterious transcendence into some outer faery realm.
- The Green Round (1933): novel. A man is haunted by a dwarf after visiting the "green round" on a beach.
- "N" (1934): short story. An encounter in London of a hidden fairyland.
- The Children of the Pool (1936): short story collection including the late-period horror stories "Change" and "Out of the Picture".
- Arthur Machen & Montgomery Evans: Letters of a Literary Friendship, 1923–1947 (Kent State University Press, 1994): correspondence.
- Bridles and Spurs (1951): essays.

== Minor works ==
- Constance Benson's autobiography Mainly Players (Butterworth, 1926) has an introduction by Machen, who had been a member of the Benson company from 1901 to 1909.
