= The Green Round =

1933 novel by Arthur Machen

- Dust-jacket for The Green Round (first edition, 1933)
- Author: Arthur Machen
- Language: English
- Genre: Horror novel
- Publisher: Ernest Benn
- Publication date: 1933
- Publication place: United Kingdom
- Media type: Print (Hardback)

The Green Round is a horror novel by Welsh author Arthur Machen. It was originally published by Ernest Benn Limited in 1933. The first U.S. edition was published by Arkham House in 1968 in an edition of 2,058 copies. It was the only book by Machen to be published by Arkham House.

Critic S. T. Joshi has referred to the novel as "a drearily verbose and unfocussed rehashing of old themes".

According to the Friends of Arthur Machen website, "Machen's final full-length work of fiction is judged a failure by some. However, in this work, Machen's earlier exploration of the fantastic moves outward to embrace the absurd, of Kafka, Camus and Sartre. Not recommended for devotees of gothic and horror, but of potential fascination for the rest of us."

Cover by Ronald Clyne of the 1968 first U.S. edition of The Green Round
