= Black Man with a Horn =

"Black Man with a Horn" is a 1980 horror novella by American writer T. E. D. Klein. It is a part of the Cthulhu Mythos cycle, and was originally published in New Tales of the Cthulhu Mythos. Critic S. T. Joshi notes that the story demonstrates a "deftness of style, a subtlety in the build-up of a horrific climax, and a deep understanding of the psychological effects of horror."

== Plot ==
The story opens with a quotation from a letter written by Lovecraft on July 23, 1934. By omitting the word "kitten", it is made to suggest something hideous.

The story's narrator is an author, whose literary career has been in the shadow of H. P. Lovecraft. The author is modeled after Lovecraft Circle member Frank Belknap Long.

The author becomes involved in a mystery after a chance encounter with a missionary named Mortimer while traveling on an airplane. The missionary, traveling in disguise, is fleeing something he encountered while in Malaysia, and refers to the Chaucha.

Later, while visiting a museum, the author comes across a reference to the Chaucha. The narrator realizes that the Chaucha are actually the Tcho-Tcho, which he had previously thought to be a fictional construct of Lovecraft. Slowly, the narrator becomes threatened by a being, possibly an avatar of Nyarlathotep, that the Tcho-Tcho worship. The being is a black, fish-like humanoid demon called the Shugoran (roughly "Questing Man") with an appendage that resembles a horn attached to its face.

There are implications that the Tcho-Tcho have a practice of growing something within human bodies, a practice which results in the narrator's brush with a Malaysian on the airplane leaving a treacly smell on his clothing. Later, in a museum, the narrator smells the same treacly smell and is told that it is molasses, a pure culture used to grow things.

The narrator attempts to track down what has happened to Mortimer, after Mortimer goes missing during a hurricane. A disturbing clue turns up in his bedroom.

The story ends with his frightened next door neighbor having seen a black face at her window, something like a man wearing a gas mask or a snorkel. The narrator wonders how long it will be until the thing comes for him.

== Publication history ==
- New Tales of the Cthulhu Mythos (Arkham House, 1980)
- Dark Gods (1985)
- Cthulhu 2000: A Lovecraftian Anthology (Arkham House, 1995)
- The Book of Cthulhu (Night Shade Books, 2011)
