= The Dunwich Horror =

1929 short story by H. P. Lovecraft

- Short story by H. P. Lovecraft
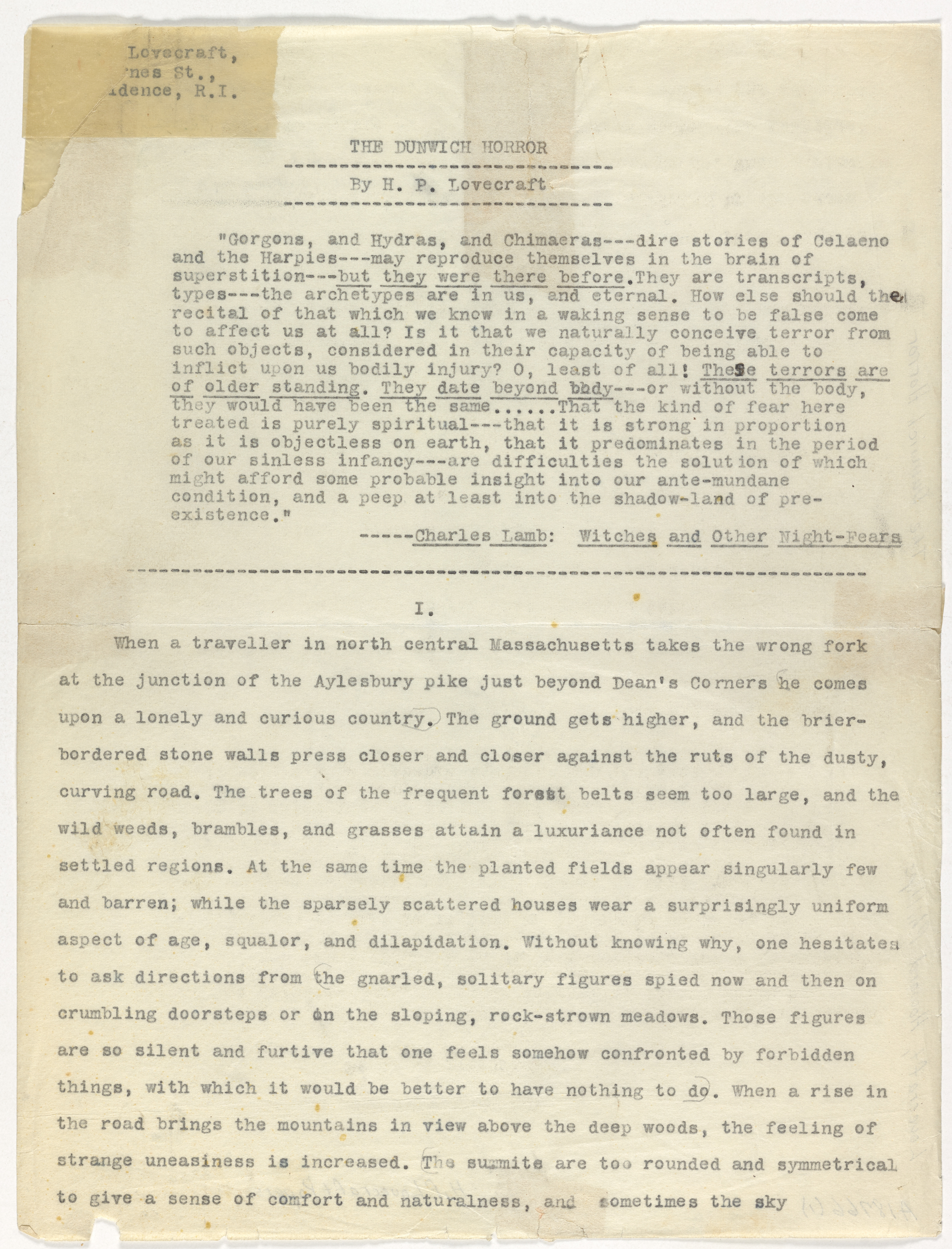
- First page of the manuscript

Text available at Wikisource
- Country: United States
- Language: English
- Genre: Cosmic horror

Publication
- Published in: Weird Tales
- Publication type: Periodical
- Media type: Print (magazine)
- Publication date: April 1929

"The Dunwich Horror" is a cosmic horror short story by American writer H. P. Lovecraft. Written in 1928, it was first published in the April 1929 issue of Weird Tales (pp. 481–508). It takes place in Dunwich, a fictional town in Massachusetts. It is considered one of the core stories of the Cthulhu Mythos.

== Plot summary ==
In the desolate, decrepit Massachusetts village of Dunwich, Wilbur Whateley is the hideous son of Lavinia Whateley, a deformed and unstable albino, and an unknown father. Strange events surround Wilbur's birth and precocious development; he matures at an abnormal rate, reaching manhood within a decade. Locals shun him and his family, and animals fear and despise him due to his repellent appearance and an unnatural, inhuman odor emanating from his body. His grandfather, a sorcerer known as "Old Whateley", indoctrinates him into certain dark rituals and the study of witchcraft. Various locals grow suspicious after Old Whateley buys more and more cattle, yet the number of his herd never increases and the cattle in his field become mysteriously afflicted with severe open wounds.

Wilbur and Old Whateley have sequestered an unseen entity at their farmhouse; this entity is connected somehow to a being known as Yog-Sothoth. Year by year, the entity grows to monstrous proportions, requiring the two men to make frequent modifications to the farmhouse. People begin to notice a trend of cattle mysteriously disappearing. Old Whateley eventually dies, and Wilbur's mother Lavinia disappears soon after. The colossal entity eventually occupies the entire interior of the farmhouse.

Wilbur ventures to Miskatonic University in Arkham to procure their copy of the Necronomicon, as the university's library is one of only a handful in the world to stock that book. The Necronomicon has spells that Wilbur can use to summon the Old Ones, but his family's copy is damaged and lacks the page he needs to open the "door". When the librarian, Dr. Henry Armitage, refuses to release the university's copy to him (and, by sending warnings to other libraries, thwarts Wilbur's efforts to consult their copies), Wilbur breaks into the library under the cover of night to steal it. A guard dog, maddened by Wilbur's alien body odor, attacks with unusual ferocity and kills him. When Armitage and two other professors, Warren Rice and Francis Morgan, arrive on the scene, they see Wilbur's semi-human corpse before it melts completely, leaving no evidence.

With Wilbur dead, no one attends to the mysterious presence growing in the Whateley farmhouse. Early one morning, the farmhouse explodes, and the thing, a towering, invisible monster, rampages across Dunwich, leaving huge prints the size of tree trunks. The monster eventually makes forays into inhabited areas. The invisible creature terrorizes Dunwich for several days, killing two families and several policemen, until Armitage, Rice, and Morgan arrive with the knowledge and weapons needed to kill it. The use of a magic powder renders the monster visible just long enough to send one of the crew into shock. It babbles in an alien tongue, then screams for help from its father Yog-Sothoth in English just before the spell destroys it, leaving a massive burned area. In the end, its nature is revealed: it was Wilbur's fraternal twin brother, but it "looked more like the father than he [Wilbur] did."

== Characters ==
Old Whateley
Lavinia Whateley's "aged and half-insane father, about whom the most frightful tales of magic had been whispered in his youth". He has a large collection of "rotting ancient books and parts of books" which he uses to "instruct and catechise" his grandson Wilbur. He dies of natural causes on August 2, 1924. Whateley was given no certain first name by Lovecraft, although Fungi from Yuggoth mentions a John Whateley. According to S.T. Joshi, "It is not certain where Lovecraft got the name Whateley," but there is a small town called Whately in northwestern Massachusetts near the Mohawk Trail, which Lovecraft hiked several times, including in the summer of 1928.

Lavinia Whateley
Born circa 1878, Lavinia Whateley is the spinster daughter of Old Whateley. Her mother met an "unexplained death by violence" when Lavinia was 12. She is described as "a somewhat deformed, unattractive albino woman" who spends her time in thunder storms and studying her father's occult tomes. Elsewhere, she is called "slatternly [and] crinkly-haired". In 1913, she gave birth to Wilbur Whateley by an unknown father, later revealed to be Yog-Sothoth. On Halloween night in 1926, she disappeared under mysterious circumstances, presumably killed or sacrificed by her son.

Wilbur Whateley
Born in 1913 to Lavinia Whateley and Yog-Sothoth. Described as a "dark, goatish-looking infant"—neighbors refer to him as "Lavinny's black brat"—he shows extreme precocity and grows unnaturally fast. Lovecraft describes him as "exceedingly ugly", though his features give an impression of "well-nigh preternatural intelligence". He is obviously monstrous under his clothes, especially below the waist, where he has little human anatomy. Lovecraft describes him as having "coarse black fur", "a score of long greenish-grey tentacles with red sucking mouths", and "what seemed to be a rudimentary eye" on each hip. His limbs are compared to saurians, and he has "ridgy-veined pads that were neither hooves nor claws".
Whately's death scene bears a marked resemblance to that of Jervase Cradock, a similarly half-human character in Arthur Machen's "The Novel of the Black Seal". Will Murray says that the goatish, partly reptilian Wilbur Whateley resembles a chimera, a mythological creature referred to in the epigraph to "The Dunwich Horror", which is taken from Charles Lamb. Robert M. Price says that Wilbur Whateley's upbringing mirrors aspects of Lovecraft's: "Wilbur's being raised by a grandfather instead of a father, his home education from his grandfather's library, his insane mother, his stigma of ugliness (in Lovecraft's case untrue, but a self-image imposed on him by his mother), and his sense of being an outsider all echo Lovecraft himself."

Henry Armitage
The head librarian at Miskatonic University. As a young man, he graduated from Miskatonic in 1881 and went on to obtain his doctorate from Princeton University and his doctor of letters at Johns Hopkins University. Lovecraft noted that while writing "The Dunwich Horror", "[I] found myself identifying with one of the characters (an aged scholar who finally combats the menace) toward the end".

Francis Morgan
Professor of Medicine and Comparative Anatomy (or Archaeology) at Miskatonic University. The story refers to him as "lean" and "youngish". In Fritz Leiber's "To Arkham and the Stars"—written in 1966 and apparently set at about that time—Morgan is described as "the sole living survivor of the brave trio who had slain the Dunwich Horror". According to Leiber, Morgan's "research in mescaline and LSD" produced "clever anti-hallucinogens" that were instrumental in curing Danforth's mental illness.

Warren Rice
Professor of Classical Languages at Miskatonic University. He is called "stocky" and "iron-grey".

== Inspiration ==
=== Geographical ===
In a letter to August Derleth, Lovecraft wrote that "The Dunwich Horror" "takes place amongst the wild domed hills of the upper Miskatonic Valley, far northwest of Arkham, and is based on several New England legends—one of which I heard only last month during my sojourn in Wilbraham," a town east of Springfield, Massachusetts. One such legend is the notion that whippoorwills can capture the departing soul.

In another letter, Lovecraft wrote that Dunwich is "a vague echo of the decadent Massachusetts countryside around Springfield, Massachusetts—say Wilbraham, Monson and Hampden". Robert M. Price notes that "much of the physical description of the Dunwich countryside is a faithful sketch of Wilbraham," citing a passage from a letter from Lovecraft to Zealia Bishop that "sounds like a passage from 'The Dunwich Horror' itself":

When the road dips again there are stretches of marshland that one instinctively dislikes, and indeed almost fears at evening when unseen whippoorwills chatter and the fireflies come out in abnormal profusion to dance to the raucous, creepily insistent rhythms of stridently piping bullfrogs.

The physical model for Dunwich's Sentinel Hill is thought to be Wilbraham Mountain near Wilbraham.

Some researchers have pointed out the story's apparent connections to another Massachusetts region: the area around Athol and points south, in the north-central part of the state (which is where Lovecraft indicates that Dunwich is located). It has been suggested that the name Dunwich was inspired by the town of Greenwich, which was deliberately flooded to create the Quabbin Reservoir, although Greenwich and the nearby towns of Dana, Enfield and Prescott actually were not submerged until 1938. Donald R. Burleson points out that several names included in the story—including Bishop, Frye, Sawyer, Rice and Morgan—are either prominent Athol names or have a connection to the town's history, but Rice is the name of a prominent Wilbraham family as well.

Athol's Sentinel Elm Farm seems to be the source for the name Sentinel Hill. The Bear's Den mentioned in the story resembles an actual cave of the same name visited by Lovecraft in North New Salem, southwest of Athol. (New Salem, like Dunwich, was founded by settlers from Salem—though in 1737, not 1692.)

The book Myths and Legends of Our Own Land (1896), by Charles M. Skinner, mentions a "Devil's Hop Yard" near Haddam, Connecticut as a gathering place for witches. The book, which Lovecraft seems to have read, also describes noises emanating from the earth near Moodus, Connecticut, which are similar to the Dunwich sounds decried by Rev. Abijah Hoadley.

=== Literary ===
Lovecraft's main literary sources for "The Dunwich Horror" are the stories of Welsh horror writer Arthur Machen, particularly "The Great God Pan" (mentioned in the text of "The Dunwich Horror") and "The Novel of the Black Seal". Both Machen stories concern individuals whose death throes reveal them to be only half-human in their parentage. According to Robert M. Price, "'The Dunwich Horror' is in every sense an homage to Machen and even a pastiche. There is little in Lovecraft's story that does not come directly out of Machen's fiction." As one example, both Wilbur Whateley and Helen Vaughan are the children of an invisible god and a human female, and both of them after dying quickly turned into black liquid.

Another source that has been suggested is "The Thing in the Woods", by Margery Williams, which is also about two brothers living in the woods, neither of them quite human and one of them less human than the other.

The name Dunwich itself may come from Machen's The Terror, where the name refers to an English town where the titular entity is seen hovering as "a black cloud with sparks of fire in it". Lovecraft also takes Wilbur Whateley's occult terms "Aklo" and "Voorish" from Machen's "The White People".

Lovecraft also seems to have found inspiration in Anthony M. Rud's story "Ooze" (published in Weird Tales, March 1923), which also involved a monster being secretly kept and fed in a house that it subsequently bursts out of and destroys.

The tracks of Wilbur's brother recall those seen in Algernon Blackwood's "The Wendigo", one of Lovecraft's favorite horror stories. Ambrose Bierce's story "The Damned Thing" also involves a monster invisible to human eyes.

== Reception ==
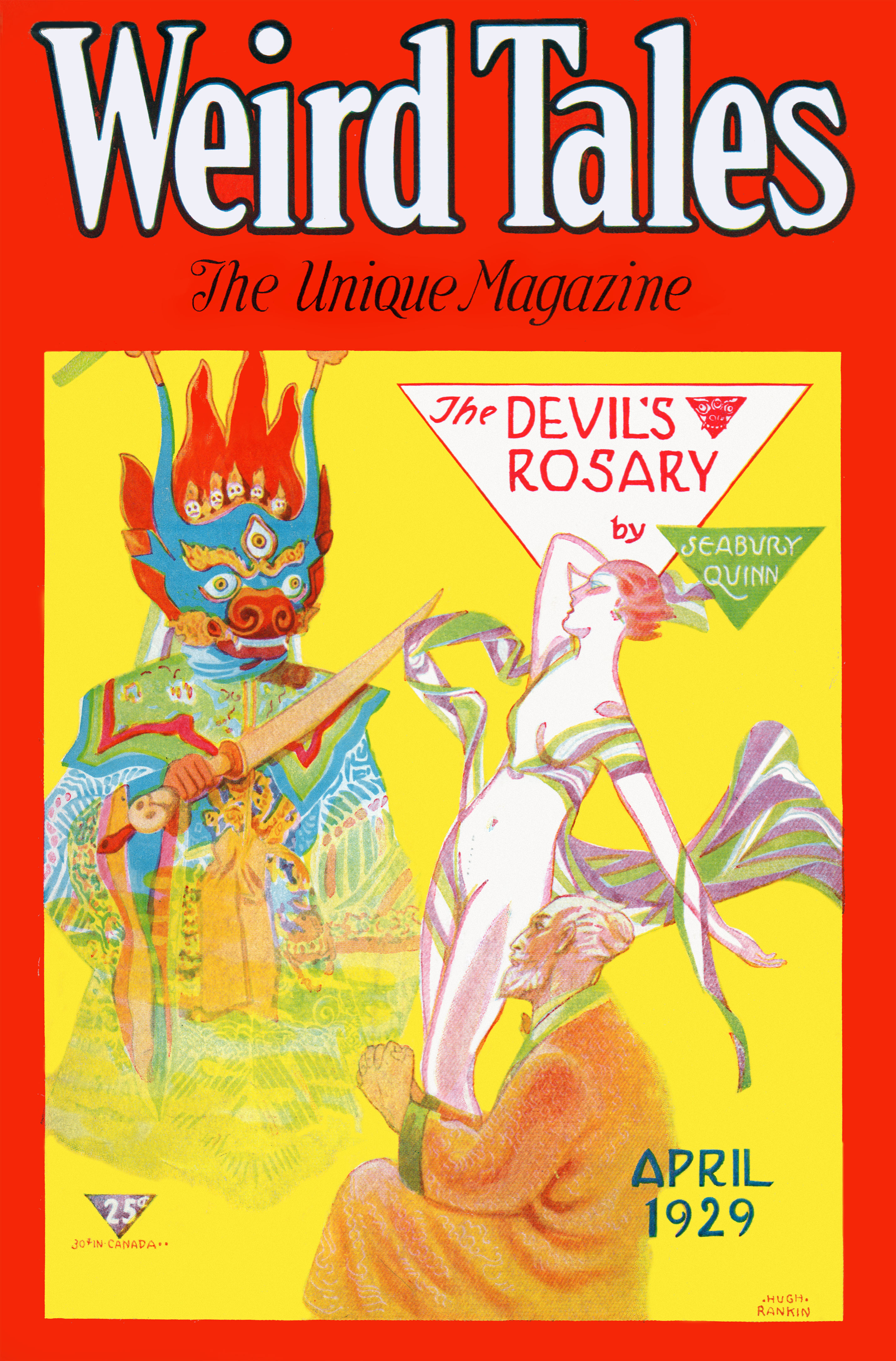
The issue of Weird Tales in which "The Dunwich Horror" was first published

Lovecraft took pride in "The Dunwich Horror", calling it "so fiendish that [Weird Tales editor] Farnsworth Wright may not dare to print it". Wright, however, snapped it up, sending Lovecraft a check for $240 (equivalent to $4,500 in 2025), which at that point was the largest single payment he had received for his fiction.

Kingsley Amis praised "The Dunwich Horror" in New Maps of Hell, listing it as one of Lovecraft's tales that "achieve a memorable nastiness". Lovecraft biographer Lin Carter calls the story "an excellent tale...A mood of tension and gathering horror permeates the story, which culminates in a shattering climax." In his list of "The 13 Most Terrifying Horror Stories", T. E. D. Klein placed "The Dunwich Horror" at number four. Robert M. Price declares that "among the tales of H. P. Lovecraft, 'The Dunwich Horror' remains my favorite." S. T. Joshi, on the other hand, regarded "Dunwich" as "simply an aesthetic mistake on Lovecraft's part", citing its "stock good-versus-evil scenario". However, he has also stated that it is "richly atmospheric".

== Cthulhu Mythos ==
Although Lovecraft first mentioned Yog-Sothoth in the novel The Case of Charles Dexter Ward, it was in "The Dunwich Horror" that he introduced the entity as one of his extra-dimensional Outer Gods. It is also the tale in which the Necronomicon makes the most significant appearance, and the longest direct quote from it appears in the text. Many of the other standards of the Cthulhu Mythos, such as Miskatonic University, Arkham, and Dunwich, also form integral parts of the tale.

== Adaptations ==
The film The Dunwich Horror was released in 1970. It stars Dean Stockwell as Wilbur Whateley, Ed Begley as Henry Armitage, and Sandra Dee. Les Baxter composed the soundtrack.

Jeffrey Combs starred as Wilbur Whately in a TV film adaptation first broadcast in October 2009 on SyFy. Dean Stockwell also stars in this version, this time as Dr. Henry Armitage.

Toei Animation adapted "The Dunwich Horror" as part of three short claymation films that were released in 2007 as a DVD compilation called H.P. Lovecraft's The Dunwich Horror and Other Stories (H・P・ラヴクラフトのダニッチ・ホラー その他の物語, Ecchi Pī Ravukurafuto no Danicchi Horā Sonota no Monogatari).

Director Richard Stanley has expressed interest in adapting "The Dunwich Horror" and has prepared a script.

In 2008 a film titled Beyond the Dunwich Horror, directed by Richard Griffin and starring Lynn Lowry, was released.

The radio drama Suspense adapted "The Dunwich Horror", starring Ronald Colman as Henry Armitage, which aired originally on November 1, 1945.

Comics artist Alberto Breccia adapted the story in 1974. It was published in the October 1979 issue of Heavy Metal magazine.

In 2011, IDW Publishing began publishing a four-issue limited adaptation of "The Dunwich Horror" by author Joe R. Lansdale and artist Peter Bergting.

Gou Tanabe adapted the story into a three-volume manga in 2021.

== Short story collection ==
The Dunwich Horror and Others is the title of a collection of H. P. Lovecraft short stories published by Arkham House, containing what August Derleth considered to be the best of Lovecraft's shorter fiction. Originally published in 1963, the 6th printing in 1985 included extensive corrections by S. T. Joshi in order to produce the definitive edition of Lovecraft's works. The collection has an introduction by Robert Bloch, titled "Heritage of Horror", reprinted from the 1982 Ballantine collection, Blood Curdling Tales of Supernatural Horror: The Best of H.P. Lovecraft.

The stories included in The Dunwich Horror and Others are "In the Vault", "Pickman's Model", "The Rats in the Walls", "The Outsider", "The Colour Out of Space", "The Music of Erich Zann", "The Haunter of the Dark", "The Picture in the House", "The Call of Cthulhu", "The Dunwich Horror", "Cool Air", "The Whisperer in Darkness", "The Terrible Old Man", "The Thing on the Doorstep", "The Shadow Over Innsmouth", and "The Shadow Out of Time".

== Sources ==
- Lovecraft, Howard P. (1984) [1928]. "The Dunwich Horror". In Joshi, S. T. (ed.). The Dunwich Horror and Others (9th corrected printing ed.). Sauk City, WI: Arkham House. ISBN 0-87054-037-8. Definitive version.
