= T. E. D. Klein =

American horror writer and editor (born 1947)

Theodore "Eibon" Donald Klein (born July 15, 1947) is an American horror writer and editor.

Klein has published very few works, but they have all achieved positive notice for their meticulous construction and subtle use of horror. Critic S. T. Joshi writes, "In close to 25 years of writing Klein has only two books and a handful of scattered tales to his credit, and yet his achievement towers gigantically over that of his more prolific contemporaries."

== Biography ==
Klein was born and lives in New York City and attended Brown University, where he wrote his honors thesis on H. P. Lovecraft, edited The Brown Daily Herald, and graduated Phi Beta Kappa in 1969. In the 1970s, he studied film history at Columbia University, wrote short fiction and non-fiction, and worked as a movie script reader for Paramount Pictures.

In 1975, Klein, with a few others, conceived the idea of a World Fantasy Convention. The first such convention was held in Providence, Rhode Island, in honour of the life and work of H. P. Lovecraft. Klein's story "The Events at Poroth Farm" was a nominee for Best Short Fiction at the convention. (The story is reprinted in Gahan Wilson, ed. First World Fantasy Awards. Doubleday, 1977, pp. 97–135, in the Library of America's American Fantastic Tales: Terror and the Uncanny from Poe to Now, edited by Peter Straub and in Klein's short story collection Reassuring Tales.

He was the editor of Twilight Zone magazine from its inception in 1981 until 1985, and served as editor of the short-lived true crime magazine CrimeBeat from 1991 to 1993. He has also taught English at New York's John Jay College and been a longtime supporter of animal rights.

He added "Eibon" to his name – a reference to Clark Ashton Smith's Hyperborean wizard – so that when he used his initials in his byline, a la H. P. Lovecraft or M. R. James, they would spell out his nickname "Ted".

Klein has blamed his limited output of fiction on writer's block. He revealed in the book Faces of Fear (1985) that he had struggled with The Ceremonies for more than five years before finally finishing it, adding: "I'm one of those people who will do anything to avoid writing. Anything!"

On November 3, 1995, Klein attended the graveside ceremony at Woodlawn Cemetery to mark the passing of writer Frank Belknap Long.

== Writings ==
He first attracted notice with the short story "The Events at Poroth Farm" (1972), in which a college lecturer, isolated in the countryside and reading horror literature for teaching in the next semester, gradually realises that genuine supernatural horror is taking place around him. The story is notable for the insidious way in which the narrator's responses to the works he is reading (including those of Charles Robert Maturin, Ann Radcliffe, "Monk" Lewis, Sheridan Le Fanu, Bram Stoker, Aleister Crowley, and Shirley Jackson) are conflated with his impressions of the supernatural threat.

In 1984 Klein published the novel The Ceremonies, which uses the same basic plot as the novella to more expansive ends; the threat this time is not to one man or one community, but to the entire world. The Ceremonies takes up and elaborates upon some of the mysteries of Arthur Machen's story "The White People" and is called "a modern classic" in an essay by Thomas F. Monteleone in the book Horror: 100 Best Books. The Ceremonies is described by Stephen King as "Wonderful, exciting and suspenseful, full of tension and a sense of deep brooding mystery", "the most exciting novel in the field to come along since Straub's Ghost Story". A revised edition was published by PS Publishing in 2017.

A second novel, Nighttown, was announced by Klein soon afterwards and described by him as "a paranoid horror novel set entirely in New York City", but it has not appeared in all the years since.

In 1985 Klein published the collection Dark Gods, which includes four novellas, "Children of the Kingdom", "Petey", "Black Man with a Horn", and "Nadelman's God". The last of these novellas was first published in this collection, whilst the others had been published previously.

In 1993, Klein co-wrote with Italian film director Dario Argento the screenplay of the giallo film Trauma, also known as Dario Argento's Trauma.

His previously unpublished short story "Growing Things" was collected in the 1999 anthology 999.

He has penned two critical essays on weird fiction: Dr Van Helsing's Handy Guide to Ghost Stories (1981), a series of articles for Twilight Zone magazine; and Raising Goosebumps for Fun and Profit (1988), originally written for Writer's Digest. As a critic, Klein was influential in encouraging the early career of Ramsey Campbell via an extensive review of his work up to the time of Demons by Daylight which was published in Nyctalops magazine.

In 2019, the Hippocampus Press published a collection of Klein's various essays, articles, and op-ed pieces entitled Providence After Dark and Other Writings (edited by S. T. Joshi).

== Awards and recognition ==
The novella "Nadelman's God" won the 1986 World Fantasy Award for Best Novella. Also in 1986, his novel The Ceremonies won him the British Fantasy Award's "August Derleth Award".

In 2012, Klein received the World Horror Convention's Grand Master Award.

== Bibliography ==
Title	Date Published	Form
The Ceremonies	1984	Novel
Dark Gods	1985	Collection
Reassuring Tales	2006	Collection
"The Events at Poroth Farm"	1972	Short story
"Renaissance Man"	1974	Short story
"S.F."	1975	Short story
"Magic Carpet"	1976	Short story
"Petey"	1979	Short story
"Children of the Kingdom"	1980	Short story
"Black Man with a Horn"	1980	Short story
"The Ceremonies: An Excerpt"	1981	Short story
"Nadelman's God"	1985	Short story
"Well-Connected"	1987	Short story
"Camera Shy"	1988	Short story
"They Don't Write 'em Like This Anymore"	1989	Short story
"They Don't Write 'em Like This Anymore: A TV Treatment in Two Versions"	1989	Short story
"Ladder"	1990	Short story
"One Size Eats All"	1993	Short story
"Curtains for Nat Crumley"	1996	Short story
"Growing Things"	1999	Short story
"Imagining Things"	2007	Short story
"Lament of an Aging English Instructor"	1972	Poem
"The Father of the Witch"	1973	Poem
"The Paintings of Hieronymus Bosch"	1973	Poem
"The Book of Hieronymus Bosch"	1988	Poem
Raising Goosebumps for Fun and Profit: A Brief Guide, for Beginners, to the How's and Why's of Horror	1988	Non-fiction
Providence After Dark and Other Writings	2019	Non-fiction
