= The Whirlwind (newspaper) =

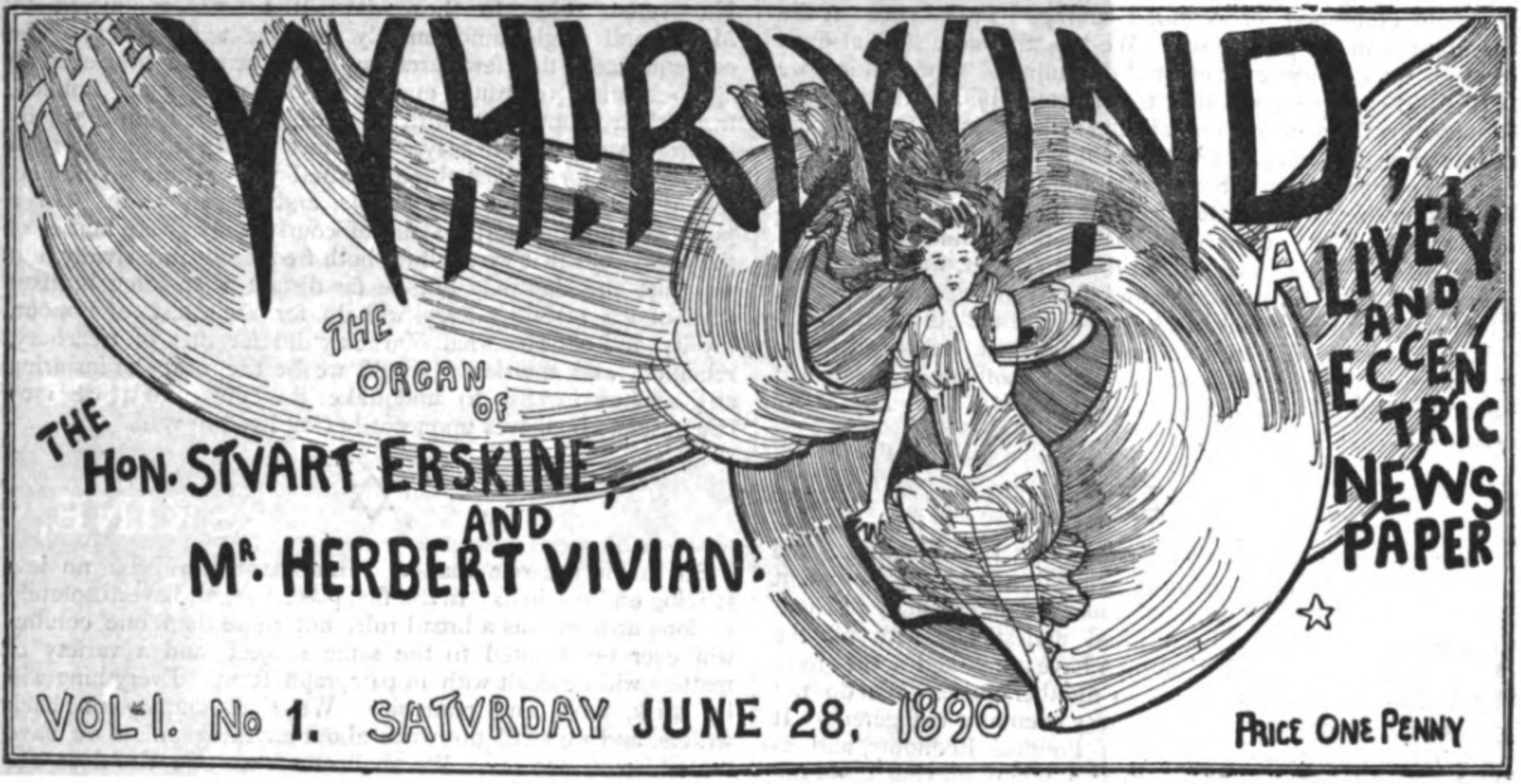
- The title illustration of the first issue of The Whirlwind
- Type: Weekly newspaper
- Owner(s): Herbert Vivian, Ruaraidh Erskine
- Editor: Herbert Vivian
- Founded: 28 June 1890; 135 years ago
- Country: United Kingdom

The Whirlwind was a short-lived British newspaper, published in 1890 and 1891. It was known for its Individualist political views and its artwork by Walter Sickert and James Abbott McNeill Whistler. It was also strongly Jacobite and played a leading role in the Neo-Jacobite Revival of the 1890s.

== History ==
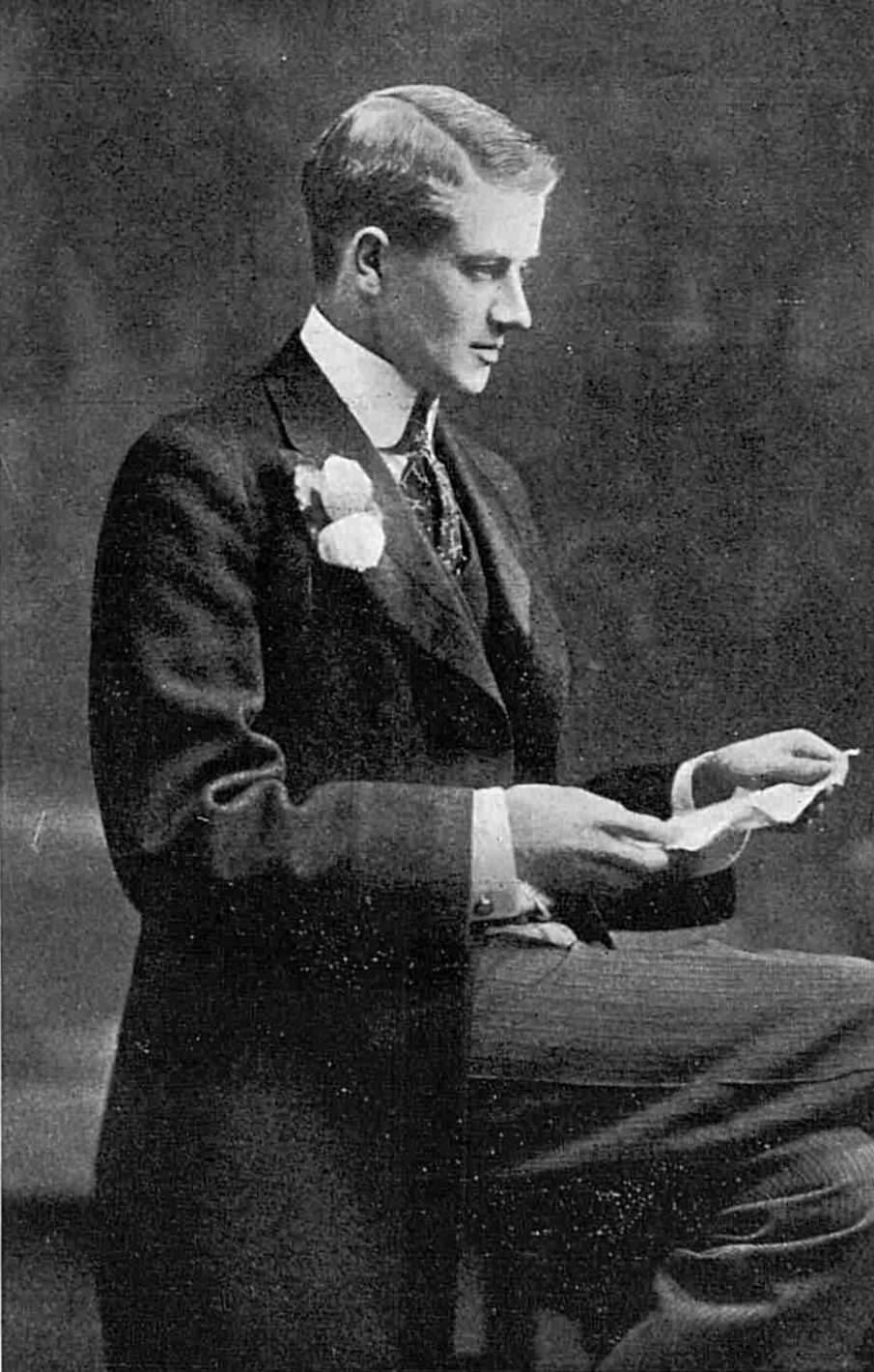
Herbert Vivian, founder and editor of The Whirlwind

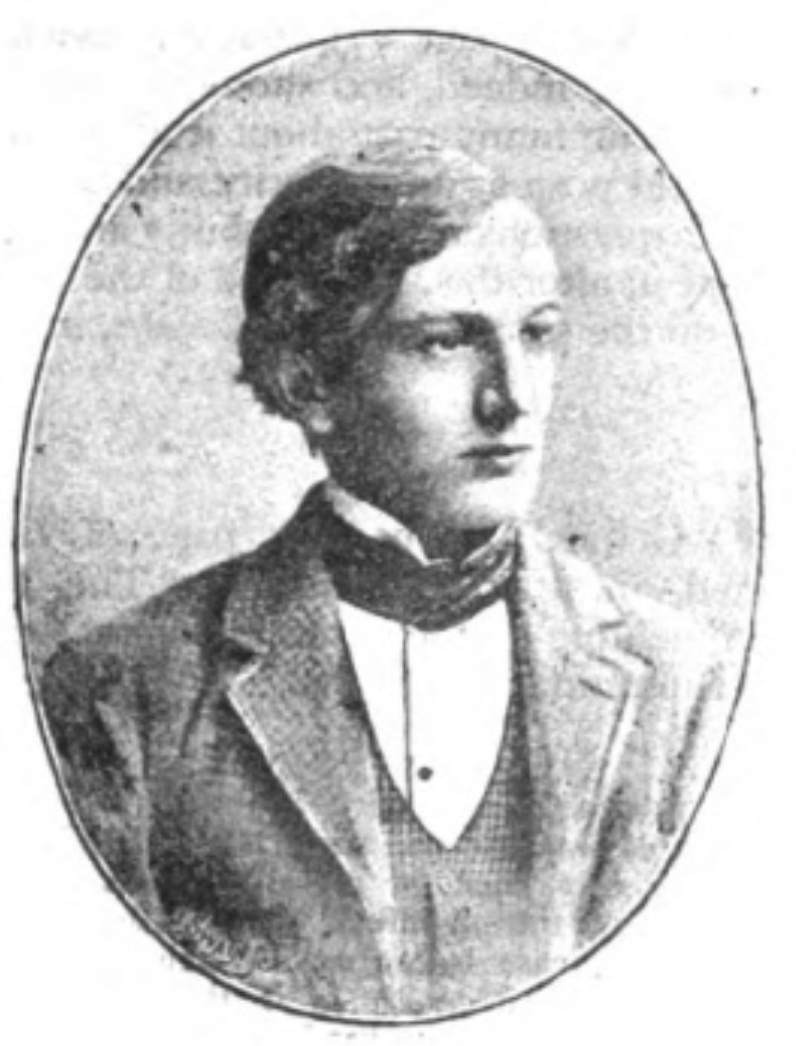
Stuart Erskine founder of The Whirlwind

=== Revival of Jacobite sympathies ===
In 1886, Bertram Ashburnham circulated a leaflet seeking Jacobite sympathisers. Following the failed Jacobite rising of 1745, Jacobites had been suppressed and had only met in small secret gatherings. By the late 19th century, Jacobitism was no longer stigmatised, and Ashburnham's leaflet gathered a number of responses. Amongst those who replied was Melville Henry Massue. Massue and Ashburnham founded the Order of the White Rose, an openly Jacobite group. The Order was officially founded on 10 June 1866.

The Order attracted Irish and Scottish Nationalists to its ranks. While these various interests gathered under the banner of restoring the House of Stuart, they also had a common streak against the scientific and secular democratic norms of the time. Some even planned (but did not execute) a military overthrow of the Hanoverian monarchy, with the aim of putting Princess Maria Theresa on the British throne. See Jacobite succession.

Two early, and enthusiastic, members of the Order were Herbert Vivian and Ruaraidh Erskine. They had met at journalism school and were keen to pursue a political campaign of Jacobite restoration.

In 1889, the New Gallery in London put on a major exhibition of works related to the House of Stuart. Queen Victoria lent a number of items to the exhibition, as did the wife of her son Prince Leopold, Duke of Albany; Jacobite families from England and Scotland donated items. The exhibition was hugely popular and provoked a widespread new interest in the Stuart monarchs. The exhibition itself showed some distinctive Jacobite tendencies, as Guthrie points out in his book:

"It is clear that the point of the whole exhibition in the New Gallery ... was a Stuart restoration and to bring the Jacobite fact and the modern succession to the Stuart claim to the attention of the British public"

=== Founding ===
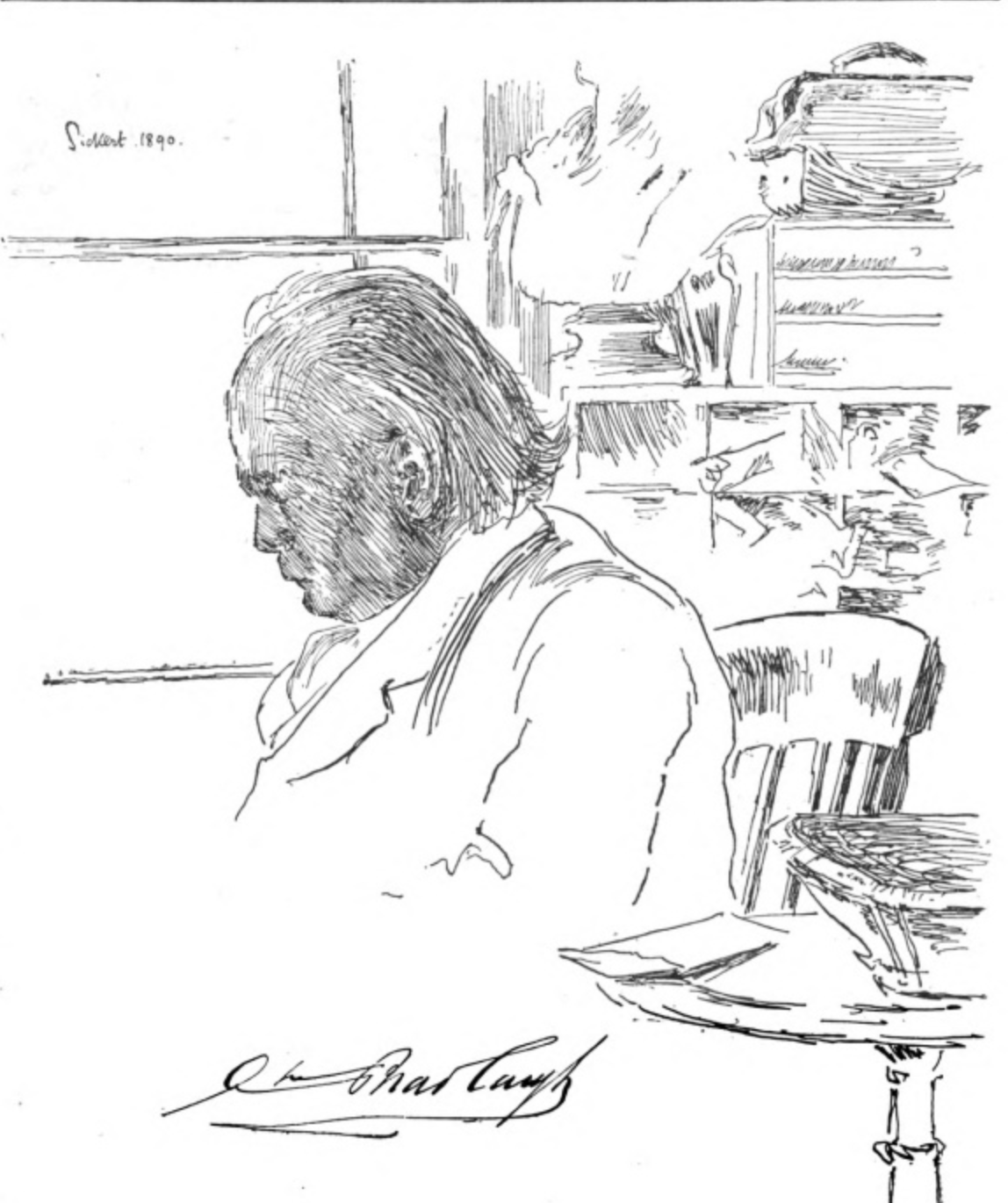
Portrait of Charles Bradlaugh MP, by Walter Sickert, from the first issue of The Whirlwind

In 1890, Vivian and Erskine founded a literary weekly newspaper The Whirlwind, A Lively and Eccentric Newspaper, with Vivian as editor. The paper had an explicitly Jacobite viewpoint, as well as espousing an extreme form of Individualism.

=== Brief life ===
The Whirlwind was noted for publishing illustrations by artists including Whistler and Walter Sickert; Sickert was also the art critic of The Whirlwind, and wrote a weekly column. It also carried articles about Oscar Wilde at the height of his fame and notoriety. The paper espoused an Individualist and Jacobite political view, championed by Erskine and Vivian,. One of the notable illustrations produced by Sickert for The Whirlwind was a portrait of Charles Bradlaugh. Bradlaugh also wrote an article on "practical individualism" for the paper.

Erskine's contributions to The Whirlwind tended towards more serious political discourse. He wrote in favour of a purely-voluntary taxation system and against women's suffrage.

Vivian was drawn more to social events and personal attacks on those he disagreed with. He wrote a number of articles attacking Henry Morton Stanley, was scathing of London's tramway system on individualist grounds, and published his series "Letters to Absurd People" skewering various political figures including Arthur Balfour, George Goschen and Henry Edward Manning, the Archbishop of Westminster.

The initial success of the paper emboldened Vivian and Erskine's political ambitions. In 1891, they split from The Order of the White Rose, and along with Massue they formed the Legitimist Jacobite League of Great Britain and Ireland. This was a much more politically motivated organization, while the Order was moving in a more artistic direction. Pittock describes the League as a "publicist for Jacobitism on a scale unwitnessed since the Eighteenth Century".

In August 1890, the paper carried an article by William Henry Wilkins, a friend of Vivian's from Cambridge University. Wilkins argued in favour of replacing the royal prerogative with popular referendums, to solve constitutional issues like Irish Home Rule and the Disestablishment of the Church of England.

In October 1890, the printers of The Whirlwind refused to complete one issue due to the inclusion of an inflammatory piece title "Young England". Erskine and Vivian promptly sued the printers for the loss of income from the cancelled edition.

=== End ===
The 8 November 1890 issue of The Whirlwind was the last to carry Erskine's name on the letterhead. Issues from 20 onwards appeared with his name crossed-out and were produced solely by Vivian. Erskine's absence from the paper was briefly note in that issue: "Our colleague has, for the nonce, been called from us. While duly deploring the discontinuance of his collaboration, we feel so deeply the importance of what is before him that we refrain from further regret and wish him Godspeed upon his delicate mission, in the full confidence that his brilliant success will shed additional lustre upon our own triumphs during his absence".

The 26th issue of the paper was published on 27 December 1890. It had fewer pages than most previous issues, and it led with a note from Vivian entitled "Not Dead but sleepy" which read, in part: "There will not be a Christmas number of The Whirlwind, but a large extra-special edition will be published on the birthday of the Proprietor-Editor, 3rd. April 1891. Until then The Whirlwind proposes to hibernate and, during the next three months, hushed in grim repose, will show no sign of life... The Proprietor-Editor finds that the direction of the Whirlwind absorbs his whole time... He intends devoting the next three months to political organization".

Early in 1891, Vivian announced he was standing for election in the Bradford East constituency and Erskine that he was standing in Buteshire.

In April 1891, despite their political ambitions, Erskine and Vivian were attempting to raise capital to restart the newspaper. Despite this, The Whirlwind did not resume publication. Its 26 issues had proved lively and eccentric indeed, filled with polemic, scurrilous personal attacks, political essays and drawings from some of the leading artists of the day.

== Reception ==
The Whirlwind debuted to a wide range of critical reactions, many of which were published in subsequent issues of the paper. In July 1890, the Lady's Pictorial described The Whirlwind as "The oddest little journal I ever saw... The young men appear to be far from lacking in ideas", the Dramatic Review called it "A monument of youthful audacity...To give anything like a comprehensive description of this extraordinary publication, is impossible" and the Nottingham Daily Express wrote "I like bare unflushing cheek—sometimes; and I am very much interested in the first number of The Whirlwind... for a more impudent little publication it would be difficult to turn out. It is frank, open egotism, though, and distinctly entertaining".

The paper was criticised for its anti-semitic stance by Victor Yarros. In September 1890, The Star newspaper described it as "Rank Treason", and the Southampton Observer said it was "at once preposterously pretentious and absurdly paradoxical", while the Huddersfield Examiner reported: "For pertness and flippancy in full swing, you need to no more than invest a penny in a copy of The Whirlwind. It will not be particularly well spent, but you will have obtained an object".
