= The Hill of Dreams =

1907 novel by Arthur Machen

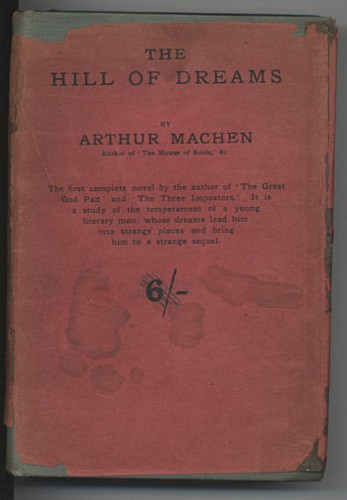
- Cover of first edition
- Author: Arthur Machen
- Language: English
- Genre: Autobiographical novel
- Publisher: Grant Richards
- Publication date: 1907
- Publication place: Wales
- Media type: Print (hardcover)
- Pages: 329 pp

The Hill of Dreams is a semi-autobiographical novel by the Welsh writer Arthur Machen.

== Plot summary ==
The novel recounts the life of a young man, Lucian Taylor, focusing on his dreamy childhood in rural Wales, in a town based on Caerleon. The Hill of Dreams of the title is an old Roman fort where Lucian has strange sensual visions, including ones of the town in the time of Roman Britain. Later, the novel describes Lucian's attempts to make a living as an author in London, enduring poverty and suffering in the pursuit of art and history.

== Literary significance and criticism ==
The Hill of Dreams was little noticed on its publication in 1907 save in a glowing review by Alfred Douglas. It was actually written between 1895 and 1897 and has elements of the style of the decadent and aesthetic movement of the period, seen through Machen's own mystical preoccupations.

Lord Dunsany admired The Hill of Dreams and wrote an introduction to a 1954 reprint of the novel. In Henry and June, Henry Miller tells Anaïs Nin about The Hill of Dreams.

According to the Friends of Arthur Machen website, the novel is

almost undoubtedly Machen's most important and moving work. Lucian Taylor, the hero, is damned either through contact with an erotically pagan "other" world or through something degenerate in his own nature, which he thinks of as a "faun". He becomes a writer, and when he moves to London he becomes trapped by the increasing reality of the dark imaginings of this creature within him, which become increasingly real. Machen drew copiously on his own early years in Wales and London, and the book as a whole is an exploration through imagination of a potential fate which he personally avoided. One of the first explorations in fiction of the figure of the doomed artist, who is biographically so much a part of the decadent 1890s.
