= Dark Gods (novel) =

1985 book by T. E. D. Klein

Dark Gods is a collection by T. E. D. Klein published in 1985. Dark Gods is a collection of four longer stories, sometimes classed as novellas. The first three had been previously published, but the final story was published first in this collection.

== Contents ==
Title	Plot Summary	Notes
"Children of the Kingdom"	Set in part during the New York City blackout of 1977 and deals with Hollow Earth lore and hostile creatures hiding in the shadows of New York.	The novella was first published in the anthology Dark Forces. It was described by critic Victor LaValle in the New York Times Book Review as "the greatest New York City horror story of all time."
"Petey"	The tale of a madman's monstrous "pet" which brings a well-to-do, middle-class housewarming to an unpleasant conclusion.	Originally published in Charles L. Grant's Shadows 2 anthology.
"Black Man with a Horn"	A tale in the vein of Lovecraft which treats of an elderly horror writer (modeled on Frank Belknap Long) and his discoveries about the dreaded Tcho-Tcho people.	First published in Ramsey Campbell's New Tales of the Cthulhu Mythos, the novella was revised in the 2014 anthology "A Mountain Walked", edited by S. T. Joshi.
"Nadelman's God"	A man finds that an overwrought poem he wrote as an adolescent has been used as an incantation to bring a monstrous deity to life.	First published in this collection.

== Reception ==
Dave Langford reviewed Dark Gods for White Dwarf #87, and stated that "the supernatural fear gets a leg-up from existing nervousness about (say) the parts of town where you wouldn't walk after dark. Low Pavement, for example, in terror-haunted Nottingham."

== Reviews ==
- Review by Stefan Dziemianowicz (1985) in Crypt of Cthulhu, #35 Hallowmas 1985
- Review by Michael A. Morrison (1985) in Fantasy Review, November 1985
- Review by Doc Kennedy (1985) in Rod Serling's The Twilight Zone Magazine, December 1985
- Review by Robert M. Price (1986) in Crypt of Cthulhu, #42 Michaelmas 1986
- Review by Don D'Ammassa (1986) in Science Fiction Chronicle, #87 December 1986
- Review by Lee Montgomerie (1987) in Interzone, #20 Summer 1987
