= The Ceremonies (novel) =

1984 novel by T. E. D. Klein

- Author: T. E. D. Klein
- Audio read by: Adam Sims
- Language: English
- Genre: Horror
- Publisher: Viking Adult, Bantam Books
- Publication date: 1984
- Publication place: United States
- Media type: Print (hardback, paperback), ebook, audiobook
- Pages: 554 pages
- ISBN: 0670209821 First edition, hardback

The Ceremonies is a novel by T. E. D. Klein published in 1984. The Ceremonies is an extension of Klein's earlier novella, "The Events at Poroth Farm", which he released in 1972.

== Plot summary ==
The novel opens with the arrival of an evil entity countless years before the dawn of humanity and life as it is known on Earth. It eventually manages to meet and coerce a human boy to serve it, with the goal of one day returning to its true strength.

Decades later, graduate student and adjunct professor Jeremy Freirs decides to rent a renovated chicken coop located in the New Jersey countryside. The property sits on the farm of Sarr Poroth; he and his wife Deborah belong to a restrictive and conservative religious sect that prides itself on eschewing modern conveniences and the modern world as a whole. Prior to traveling to the farm Jeremy meets Carol, a library assistant and failed novitiate to whom he is drawn. While they believe their meetings to be random coincidence, in truth they were orchestrated by the elderly Mr. Rosebottom, the human boy from so long ago.

Rosebottom's goal is to guide Carol through a series of rituals preparing her for a final one to be held on Lammas, using her naiveté to ensure that she is unaware of her participation. This final ritual will use Carol's body to birth the evil entity. Jeremy is to be killed and reanimated by the entity so it can serve as its own "father". While Rosebottom is busy in the city with Carol, a remnant of the entity manages to possess one of the Poroths' cats and eventually Deborah herself, in the process killing its hosts. As the rituals continue the arcane magic results in dramatic environmental changes in New Jersey and New York, as well as disturbances in the Poroths' religious community and the formation of a suspected volcano in an area close to the Poroth farm. This causes the community to believe that Jeremy's presence is the cause.

On the night of the ceremony Rosebottom arrives with Carol to the Poroth farm. The entity works with Rosebottom to prepare the volcanic hill for the ritual, but they fail to obtain Jeremy as a host. It instead possesses Sarr and discards Deborah's body in a wasp-filled shed, unintentionally trapping the insects. It also manages to abscond with Carol, after drugging both her and Jeremy and tying them up. As the community arrives to force Jeremy to leave, Rosebottom hides in the shed, unaware that it is full of angry wasps, and is stung to death. The angry religious members arrive and discover Jeremy, unconscious and tied up. When he comes to, he realizes where the entity has taken Carol and manages to arrive just as the ceremony is in progress but has not been completed. He manages to defeat the entity, but a remnant of it escapes.

The book ends with Jeremy and Carol walking through New York City. The pair are now married and while the ceremony was seemingly unsuccessful, Jeremy briefly worries that the entity is still out there.

== Release ==
The novel was first published in the United States in 1984 through Viking Adult, which released a hardback edition. A mass-market paperback edition was released the following year in the United States and United Kingdom via Bantam Books and Pan, respectively. The Ceremonies was later translated into Japanese in 2004 (復活の儀式. lit. Resurrection Ritual) and Spanish (Ceremonias macabras, lit. Macabre Ceremonies) in 1987.

An audiobook adaptation narrated by Adam Sims was released in 2019 via Audible Studios.

== Reception ==
Dave Langford reviewed The Ceremonies for White Dwarf #77, and stated that "Besides the thought that this is overdoing it a bit, one wonders where 'beyond the farthest depths of space' may be, and whether a sunless cavern there is necessarily darker than one near Milton Keynes. Yet Klein's writing has been praised; presumably it's what the market wants. . . ."

== Reviews ==
- Review by Fritz Leiber (1984) in Locus, #282 July 1984
- Review by Steven Mariconda (1984) in Crypt of Cthulhu, #25 Michaelmas 1984
- Review by Michael A. Morrison (1984) in Fantasy Review, October 1984
- Review by C. J. Henderson (1984) in Whispers #21-22, December 1984
- Review by Don D'Ammassa (1986) in Science Fiction Chronicle, #76 January 1986
