= Richie Tozier =

Fictional character from the novel IT

- It character
- Finn Wolfhard (left) and Bill Hader (right) as Richie Tozier in It and It Chapter Two
- First appearance: It (1986)
- Created by: Stephen King
- Portrayed by: 1990 miniseries: Seth Green (child) Harry Anderson (adult); 2017 film and 2019 sequel: Finn Wolfhard (child) Bill Hader (adult)

In-universe information
- Full name: Richard Tozier
- Nicknames: Rich; Richie; Trashmouth
- Occupation: Disc jockey (novel); Late-night talk show host (miniseries); Stand-up comedian (movie)
- Family: Margaret "Marge" Truman (mother); Wentworth Tozier (father)
- Home: Derry, Maine; Los Angeles, California

Richard "Richie" Tozier (/tɒʒər/ t-o-zh-ər) is a fictional character created by Stephen King and one of the main characters of his 1986 novel It. He was portrayed by Seth Green as a child and Harry Anderson as an adult in the 1990 miniseries adaptation of the novel. He was later portrayed by Finn Wolfhard as a child in the 2017 film and Bill Hader as an adult in its 2019 sequel.

== Fictional character biography ==
Richard (Richie) Tozier was born on March 7, 1946 (novel), 1950 (miniseries), or 1976 (films) and is the son of Margaret " Marge" Truman and Wentworth Tozier. Richie is known for his loudmouthed and sarcastic personality, which leads to him being called "Richie 'Trashmouth' Tozier" by his peers. Richie is best friends with Bill Denbrough and the other members of The Losers Club Stanley Uris, Eddie Kaspbrak, Ben Hanscom, Beverly Marsh, and Mike Hanlon. After Bill's younger brother Georgie is killed by Pennywise the Dancing Clown, Richie and his friends each have individual encounters with Pennywise before facing It collectively in the sewers. After this encounter, they believe they have killed It, but they take an oath that if they have not succeeded, they will one day return to Derry to finish the job.

Twenty-seven years later, Richie is a disc-jockey in Beverly Hills and one of the only members of The Losers Club to have never married. Richie receives a call from Mike – who remained behind in Derry – that It has returned, causing the death of Adrian Mellon. Richie returns to Derry and reunites with The Losers Club, with whom he encounters It once again. Eventually, the group descends into the sewers to kill It by performing the Ritual of Chüd. During the ritual, It mortally wounds and kills Eddie, leaving Richie devastated. However, the Losers still succeed in defeating It, and Richie and the rest of the group leave the sewers.

== Adaptations ==
Richie was portrayed by Seth Green as a child, and by Harry Anderson as an adult in the 1990 miniseries, and by Ankur Javeri as a child and Nasir Khan as an adult (named "Raja") in the 1998 television series. The adult portrayal is well known for a scene where Pennywise taunts him in a public library, which has become iconic for Tim Curry's over-the-top performance.

Richie was portrayed again by Finn Wolfhard in the 2017 film and as an adult by Bill Hader in the 2019 sequel. This interpretation of Richie tends to make more pop-culture references and becomes a stand-up comedian as an adult rather than a DJ.

In the prequel television series It: Welcome to Derry, Richie appears in a missing person's poster shown by It to Marge Truman who is revealed to be Richie's mother. He is named after Rich Santos, Marge's first love who died protecting her in the Black Spot Fire. Jason Fuchs, one of the show's writers, confirmed that Marge named her son after Rich because she was still in love with him, even though Derry's supernatural effects on memories had caused her to forget about him. Marge's feelings for him and her memories of the events of 1962 remained trapped in the subconscious.

=== Sexuality ===
In the 2019 adaptation of It Chapter Two, Richie is portrayed as a closeted gay man who harbors unrequited romantic feelings towards Eddie Kaspbrak. In a flashback to Richie's adolescence, he is harassed at the Aladdin arcade by Connor Bowers and targeted with explicit homophobic slurs. After breaking down and fleeing the arcade, he seeks refuge at a large statue of Paul Bunyan in the town square. Later in the film, when the adult Losers return to Derry, Pennywise manifests to an older Richie as a hybrid of itself and the statue, taunting him with the fact that he knows his "dirty little secret." This is widely regarded as a direct reflection of Richie's anxieties surrounding his inability to come to terms with his sexual identity.

Eddie's death serves as a pivotal moment in defining Richie's sexuality and unrequited desire. After being impaled by one of Pennywise's limbs, Eddie succumbs to his blood loss in Richie's arms. Richie is visibly more upset by Eddie's death than the rest of the group, breaking down in tears as soon as they exit the sewers. The rest of the Losers respond by pulling him into a hug as he processes the loss of his best friend and unrequited love. In one of the final scenes of the film, Richie re-carves his and Eddie's initials into a bridge referred to as the "kissing bridge", a spot where, historically, young couples would often pause to steal a kiss.

Director Andy Muschietti has stated that the decision to depict Richie as queer in It Chapter Two was based on his own interpretation of the book. Stephen King said that while he didn't intend for there to be an unrequited romance between the two characters, he approved of the storyline, saying "It's one of those things that's kind of genius, because it echoes the beginning [with Adrian Mellon's gay bashing]. It comes full circle. At least there's love involved. Somebody cares for Eddie, and that echoes the love that Adrian's partner has for him. So that was cool."

=== Comedy ===
Richie is regarded as the comic relief of The Losers Club. He is known for cracking jokes at inappropriate times, causing to his friends to develop and utilise the phrase "beep beep, Richie" when they want him to stop talking. Unlike the original novel or earlier adaptations, where his comedic personality is purely regarded as amusing, the most recent adaptations interpret Richie's humor as a defense mechanism, used as a deflection from his fears of rejection and abandonment or to hide his feelings for Eddie. The latter is often on the receiving end of Richie's jokes, creating a playful push-and-pull dynamic between the two that Richie often tips into flirtatious teasing. Once Richie has his first encounter with Pennywise, his comedy also becomes a mechanism to cope with his trauma, masking his true fears of the supernatural being and the possibility of his death at the hands of the creature.

== Appearances in other King stories ==
Richie briefly appears in a cameo appearance in King's novel 11/22/63. In the novel, after the events of Pennywise, Richie is seen dancing with Beverly preparing for a talent show. The two are approached by time traveler Jake Epping, who inquires about the Dunning family. Afterwards, Epping teaches the two how to dance properly. However, this meeting is erased by the end of the novel as Epping removes his mark on history.

In King's novel Duma Key, the song excerpt in the beginning is by a band called Shark Puppy. In the credits page of the book, the song is written by R. Tozier and W. Denbrough.

== Reception ==
The portrayals of Richie in the 2017 film adaptation by Wolfhard and the 2019 sequel by Hader were both highly praised and considered to be "show-stealers". Both portrayals were noted for their comedic relief and chemistry with their fellow cast members, in particular between Wolfhard and Jack Dylan Grazer for the first film and Hader and James Ransone in the second. Hader's portrayal was noted for its blend of comedy and drama when required, as well as the subtle references to Richie's sexuality and his implicated love for Eddie, referred to by Pennywise as his "dirty little secret."
