= Pennywise =

Antagonist of Stephen King's 1986 novel "It"

- Stephen King character
- Top: Tim Curry as Pennywise in the 1990 miniseries Bottom: Bill Skarsgård as Pennywise in the 2017 film
- First appearance: It (1986)
- Created by: Stephen King
- Portrayed by: Tim Curry (1990 miniseries); Bill Skarsgård (2017 film, 2019 sequel, and 2025 prequel series)

In-universe information
- Full name: Unknown (possibly nameless)
- Aliases: It (sometimes capitalized as "IT"); Robert "Bob" Gray; Pennywise the Dancing Clown
- Species: Trans-dimensional alien entity
- Gender: Female; Male (as Pennywise)
- Relatives: The Other (creator)

It, commonly known as Pennywise the Dancing Clown, is the titular main antagonist of Stephen King's 1986 horror novel It, and its adaptations. The character is an ancient, trans-dimensional malevolent entity who preys upon the children (and sometimes adults) of the fictional town of Derry, Maine, roughly every 27 years, using a variety of supernatural powers that include the abilities to shapeshift and manipulate reality. Over the course of the story, the character primarily appears in the form of Pennywise the Dancing Clown. A group of Derry children who call themselves the "Losers Club" becomes aware of Pennywise's presence after it kills Losers Club leader Bill Denbrough's little brother, Georgie; the children then decide to hunt it down and kill it. Pennywise was portrayed by Tim Curry in the 1990 television adaptation and by Bill Skarsgård in the 2017 film adaptation, its 2019 sequel It Chapter Two, and the HBO prequel series It: Welcome to Derry.

Inspired by fairytale trolls, King conceived of a shapeshifting entity living in the sewers that could embody whatever frightened its target most. Pennywise became the central form It used to lure children — appearing to be a harmless clown. Scholars and critics have noted the effectiveness of this design, as clowns are commonly viewed as uncanny (both in the sense of coulrophobia and in the form of the uncanny valley). Across the various adaptations of It, Pennywise's visual performance evolution reinforced coulrophobia. Curry's performance in the 1990 miniseries emphasized charm masking a hidden evil, while Skarsgård's version leaned into overt horror with twitchy movements and an animalistic stare. Critics praised Skarsgård's performance as sadistic and alien. Scholars also commented on how the character's various forms channeled classic childhood fears while also reflecting deeper social issues.

== Concepts ==
=== Novel ===
In a 2013 interview, King stated that he conceived Pennywise after determining that what children feared "more than anything else in the world" was clowns. After finishing The Stand, King was walking across a bridge in Colorado when he imagined a troll like the one in the children's tale "Three Billy Goats Gruff", (Note: This is also referenced at the end of the book when Bill and Mike are discussing Its lair. Bill said of the doorway leading into it that he got the image of goats walking over a bridge, and mentioned the Three Billy Goats Gruff story by name.) though he imagined it living in a sewer system rather than under a bridge. He said the whole story "just bounced" into his head; in particular the fact that the character could shapeshift. In 1985, while publishing Skeleton Crew, a book of short fiction, King conceived of the character as a "final exam on horror" featuring various childhood monsters, resulting in a shapeshifting creature that embodies fear. He said he thought he was done writing about monsters, and wanted to "bring on all the monsters one last time...and call it 'It'."

In the novel, the Losers believe "It" to be a taelus, a Himalayan creature that reads minds and assumes the shape of whatever his target fears most, similar to a boggart. Pennywise scares his victims first because he feeds on their fear, especially that of children. Commentators have thus argued that the character is a Lovecraftian horror dwelling beneath Derry.

=== Miniseries, television and films ===
In the 1990 miniseries, Pennywise is portrayed by English actor Tim Curry. Curry's Pennywise was designed to portray a regular circus clown. Special effects artist Bart Mixon avoided making Pennywise look like a monster at first glance, saying "90% of the time he's suckering kids in." He began drawing concepts for how Pennywise would look before Curry was cast, researching the general appearances of clowns for inspiration. Original storyboards for Pennywise featured exaggerated cheekbones, a sharp chin, and a bulbous forehead. There are no overtly inhuman features apparent in Curry's Pennywise until it attacks. Curry and his team found it most effective to let Curry's facial expressions carry the horror instead.

English actor Will Poulter was originally cast as Pennywise in the 2017 film, with Curry describing the role as a "wonderful part" and wishing Poulter the best of luck, but the latter dropped out of the production due to scheduling conflicts and the film's original director Cary Fukunaga leaving the project. After Poulter's departure, the role ultimately went to Swedish actor Bill Skarsgård, who portrayed the character in the 2017 film adaptation, It, its 2019 sequel It Chapter Two, and its prequel television series It: Welcome to Derry. In 2023, it was announced that Skarsgård would not be participating in It: Welcome to Derry because he wanted to leave the character behind and focus on other roles, but by 2024 he had changed his mind.

In the films, director Andy Muschietti chose a new interpretation of the character's look and feel. He said that he wanted to stay true to the character's essence, and that Skarsgård caught his attention. Skarsgård's Pennywise is more overtly creepy, less humorous, and stands out more. Muschietti said he wanted Pennywise to look older than a typical 20th-century clown, since the creature had existed for thousands of years. He felt that modern clowns looked "cheap" and were too tied to social events and circuses, saying he preferred the look of 19th-century clowns. Thus, he and his sister Barbara (the film's producer) decided to use the 1800s and earlier periods as an inspiration. In an interview with Entertainment Weekly, costume designer Janie Bryant explained that Pennywise's suit was inspired by various historical eras, including the Medieval, Renaissance, Elizabethan, and Victorian periods. Bryant said she wanted Pennywise to feel more organic, drawing on King's description of him wearing a silvery-gray clown suit.

Skarsgård's Pennywise appears as a background character in the 2021 family-friendly film Space Jam: A New Legacy, which is also distributed by Warner Bros.

One analysis of the television series It: Welcome to Derry described the creature as a "demonic, liver-eating baby". The character is described as transforming into a family of people which gradually transform into demon-like creatures. In an interview with Entertainment Weekly, Muschietti compared the creature's first appearance and reveal to the one seen in Jaws. He pointed out that the television series provides more space to explore the character's various forms other than that of Pennywise, whose clown form is not shown until several episodes in.

=== Shapeshifting abilities ===
The character can shapeshift and takes many forms throughout the novel, though its most iconic form is Pennywise the Dancing Clown — described as having a baggy silvery white suit with orange pom-pom buttons down the front, big white gloves, a big electric blue tie (sometimes a big yellow bow tie), eyes that changed from yellow to blue to silver, two big tufts of red hair on either side of his bald head, white clown makeup and a big red clown smile painted over his mouth. Other forms the character takes include Georgie (as well as his rotting corpse), a leper, a mummy, and a witch. (Note: In this form, It introduces Itself to Beverly Marsh as "Mrs. Kersh".) Pennywise is also seen impersonating various children and adults (both living and dead) from Derry in order to scare, taunt, or manipulate his prey, particularly the Losers.

The character's true form, however, is unknown. In-universe, the closest the human mind can come to perceiving it is the "deadlights," which are capable of hypnotizing or killing anyone who stares into them. The only person to recover from the ordeal is Bill's wife Audra, although she is rendered temporarily catatonic by the experience. In It, Pennywise captures Beverly Marsh and shows her the deadlights, causing her to float and temporarily lose consciousness. In It Chapter Two, it is revealed that this experience resulted in Beverly having visions of the future. Losers' Club member Ben Hanscom comes dangerously close to seeing the deadlights and the shape behind the lights for a brief moment. He described what he saw as an endless, crawling, hairy creature made of orange light. The final physical form the character is seen in during the Losers' final battle is that of a monstrous giant spider that lays eggs.

Throughout the novel, It is generally referred to as male, calling himself "Bob Gray" and taking a male form as Pennywise the Clown. However, when confronting the character's spider form, the characters find out that the creature is most likely female, due to the character's final form in the physical realm being that of a giant female spider that was also pregnant.

== Appearances ==
=== Appearances in the novel ===
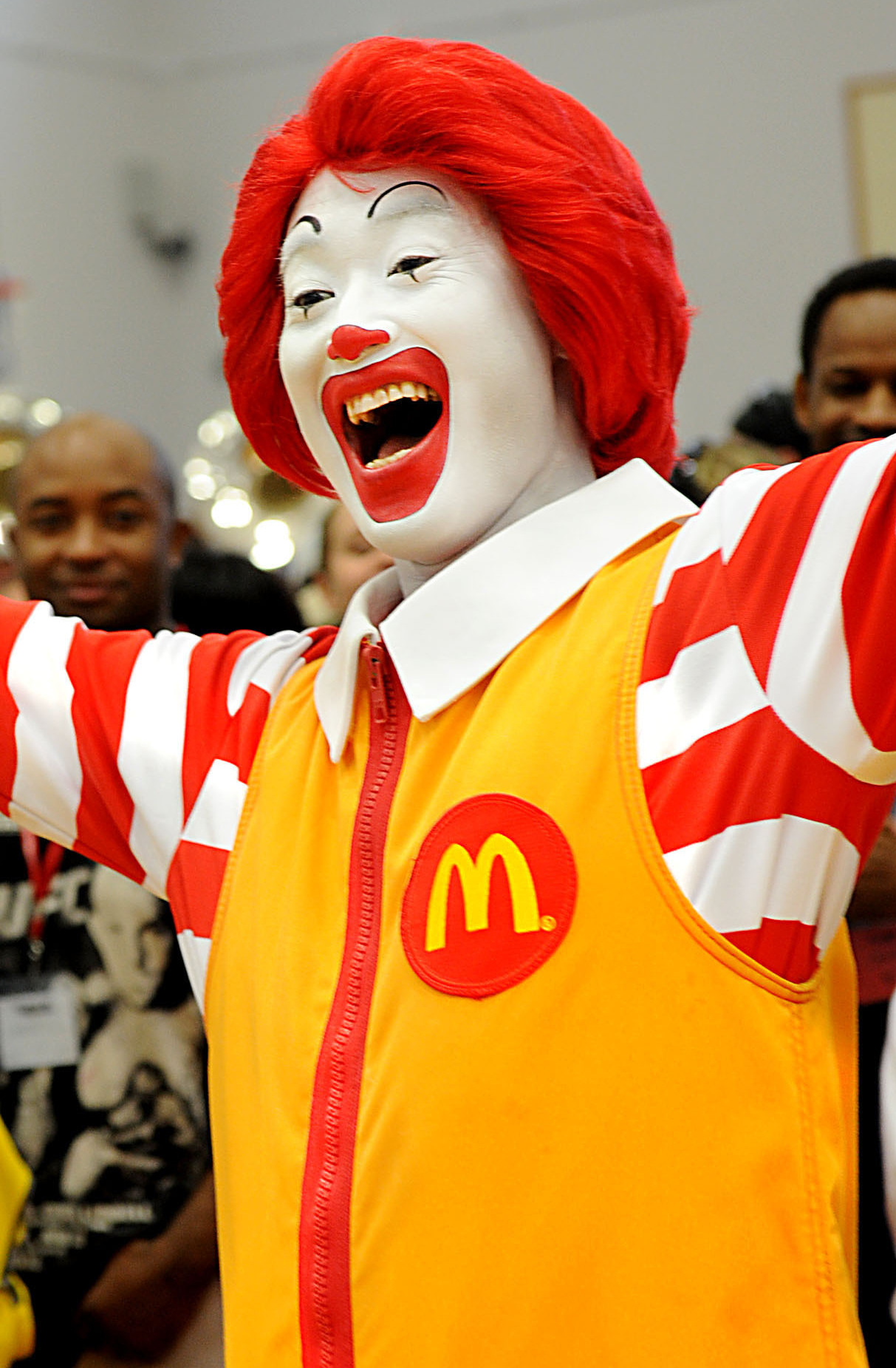
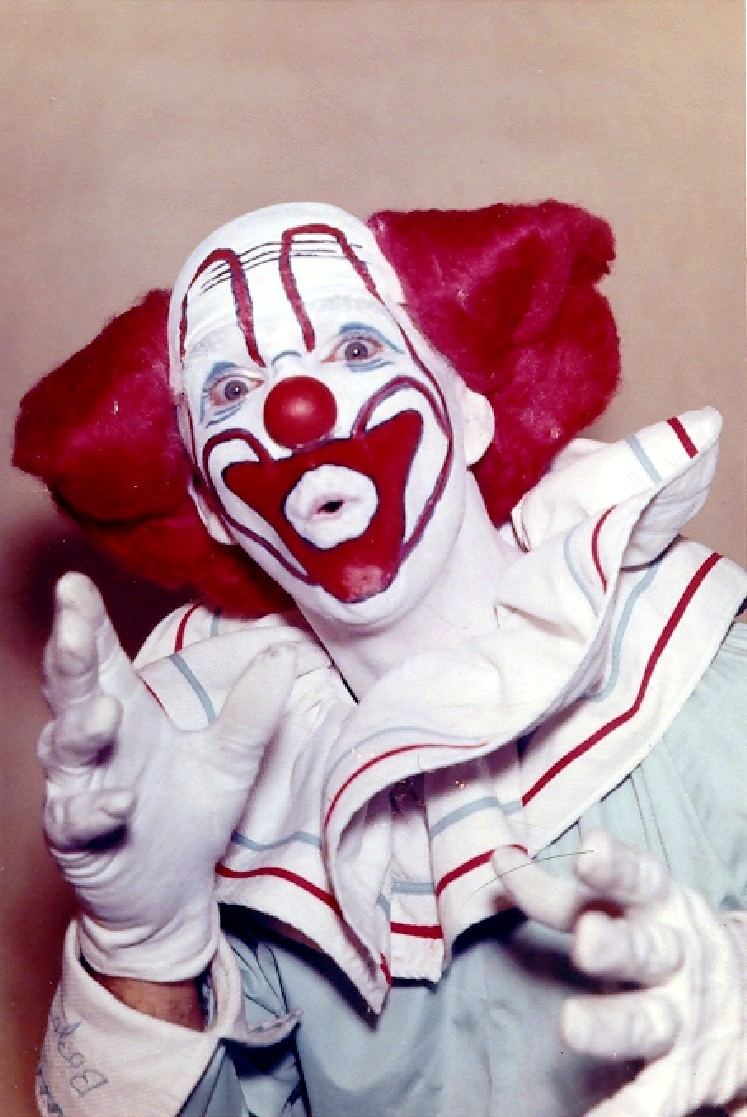
In the novel, Pennywise is described as a cross between Ronald McDonald, Bozo, and Clarabell the Clown.

In the novel, "It" is a shapeshifting evil entity who usually takes the form of Pennywise the Dancing Clown, originating in a void containing and surrounding the universe — a place referred to in the novel as the "macroverse". (Note: Per the Dark Tower series.) Bill believes that It, along with the Turtle (Its benevolent equivalent), was created by an entity known as the "Other" (a mysterious, benevolent force beyond both Pennywise and the Turtle). Pennywise came to Earth in an asteroid crash and settled beneath the area that would become Derry. He slept for millions of years, then woke when humans arrived. He began a year-long or two years-long cycle of feeding on fear, taking the form of whatever his victims feared most. After feeding, Pennywise would go back into hibernation for about twenty-seven years before reappearing. He prefers to feed on children because their fears are easier to understand and manifest physically, and adults are harder to scare. He can control weak-minded people, either making them ignore the horrors around them or turning them into accomplices. When introducing himself to humans, he uses the name Robert "Bob" Gray.

His hibernation periods begin and end with horrific events, such as the disappearance of all 340 settlers from Derry Township from 1740 to 1743 (in which the settlers mysteriously disappeared without a trace) or the 1906 Kitchener Ironworks explosion, killing 108 people, 88 of whom were children at an Easter Egg hunt. He woke during a major storm that flooded part of Derry in October 1957. Bill Denbrough's younger brother Georgie was the first of many victims that year. Bill and his friends, known collectively as the Loser's Club, investigate the disappearances and note that they all had something to do with Derry's sewer system; using this information, they deduce correctly that he uses a well house as a lair. Through the use of a Native American-style smoke-hole ceremony, it is revealed that the creature came from outer space. The children go to the house and are attacked by him in the form of a werewolf. Beverly shoots a slug from a slingshot at the creature, injuring Pennywise and causing him to flee back into the sewers. The narrative then briefly switches to his point of view, where he sees himself as superior and considers the Turtle an equal and humans mere "toys." He also confirms that he chooses to prey on children because they are easier to fool and scare. He believes their fears are easier to interpret in a physical manner, which he claims is similar to "salting the meat", as frightened flesh tastes better to him. Bill establishes a telepathic connection with Pennywise through the Ritual of Chüd. The Ritual of Chüd is a psychic and spiritual battle of wills between Bill and Pennywise. Bill metaphorically "bites down" on Pennywise's tongue with humor and childish beliefs such as Santa Claus, and the two engage in a sort of mind-to-mind duel across the macroverse. Pennywise is surprised by the children's victory in battle and near the end of the book, Pennywise begins to question his preconceived notions of superiority. However, he never believes that the individual children are strong enough to defeat him, only through the Other working through them as a group could they have won in battle. After the battle, the Losers Club get lost in the sewers until Beverly has sexual intercourse with all the boys to bring unity back to the group. The Losers then swear a blood oath to return to Derry should Pennywise reawaken. The Losers eventually drift apart and go their separate ways in life and, except for Mike who continues to remember everything, forget about both Derry and each other.

Pennywise reawakens in 1984 after Adrian Mellon, a gay man, is murdered by a group of homophobes at a festival. He then causes a string of child murders in Derry, causing an adult Mike Hanlon to call his fellow Losers back to town to defeat Pennywise once again. Stan Uris, one of the Losers who participated in the battle against Pennywise as a child, commits suicide, afraid of facing Pennywise again. After catching up over some lunch, the remaining Losers agree that this time they will make sure to kill him once and for all. The Losers split up and explore different parts of Derry to restore their memories. Pennywise manipulates Beverly's husband Tom Rogan to capture Audra and bring her to his lair in an attempt to use her as bait for the Losers. Bill, Ben, Beverly, and fellow Losers Richie Tozier and Eddie Kaspbrak learn that Mike is near death after a confrontation with Henry Bowers, and realize they are being forced into another fight against Pennywise. The adult Losers finally reach Pennywise's lair and find It has taken the form of a giant spider. Bill and Richie enter his mind through the Ritual of Chüd, but they get lost in it after Bill fails to "bite down" on Pennywise's tongue. To distract Pennywise and bring Bill and Richie back, Eddie runs towards the spider and uses his aspirator to spray medicine at it. Although he is successful in hurting the spider, it bites off Eddie's arm, and Eddie quickly bleeds to death. It runs away to tend to its injuries, but Bill, Richie, and Ben chase after it and find that it has laid eggs. Ben stays behind to destroy the eggs, while Bill and Richie head toward their final confrontation with Pennywise. Bill fights his way inside the spider's body, locates its heart and crushes it between his hands, killing Pennywise once and for all. The group meets up to head out of the lair, and although they try to bring Audra and Eddie's bodies with them, they are forced to leave Eddie behind. They make it to the surface and realize that the scars on their hands from when they were children have disappeared, indicating that their ordeal is finally over forever. At the same time that Pennywise is killed, an enormous storm sweeps through Derry. The Losers plan to return to their homes and gradually begin to forget about Pennywise, Derry, and each other once again.

=== Differences between the book and films ===
In the 1990 miniseries, the story is split into two episodes covering the Losers' childhood in 1960 and their adulthood in 1990. The narrative structure is similar to the novel, using flashbacks to show the children's encounters with Pennywise as the adult Losers recollect their past. In the miniseries, the character fulfills a largely identical role to that of the novel, preying on children before entering a long cycle of hibernation. The most notable change is that Pennywise's resting period is extended from twenty-seven to thirty years.

IndieWire's Jamie Righetti says the most obvious difference between the book and the films is the time difference — the novel, for instance, has Georgie's death in 1957 and Pennywise's final defeat in 1985, but the films have these events in 1989 and 2016 respectively. Righetti also notes that in the film the characters do not manage to recover Georgie's body. The classic horror movie villains Pennywise shapeshifts into are also gone from the films. Similar to the novel and miniseries, the character feeds on fear, targeting children because they are easier to scare. In the 2017 film, Pennywise says that fear is "tasty" and "beautiful", but does not go into much more detail than that in either film.

The Ritual of Chüd is completely absent in the first film, and the fight between the child Losers and Pennywise is a purely physical one. In It Chapter Two, the ritual is completely reimagined. In the film, Mike explains that he learned about the Ritual's existence from local Native American tribes. The Losers gather in the Neibolt Street house and summon Pennywise using artifacts from their childhood, which they collected during their exploration of Derry. The Ritual consists of burning these tokens in a vessel, which is supposed to trap him in his true form. The ritual fails to truly entrap Pennywise, however, and the Losers are forced to fight him again. In It Chapter Two, Pennywise's final form changes from a giant spider to a clown-spider hybrid. The Losers defeat him by psychologically diminishing him using insults, confronting their fears and reducing Pennywise's image of himself to something small, causing his body to shrink. They then reach into Pennywise's small body and crush his heart with their hands together. The storm that ensues after Pennywise's defeat is replaced with the destruction of the house where the battle took place.

== Impact ==
=== Reception ===
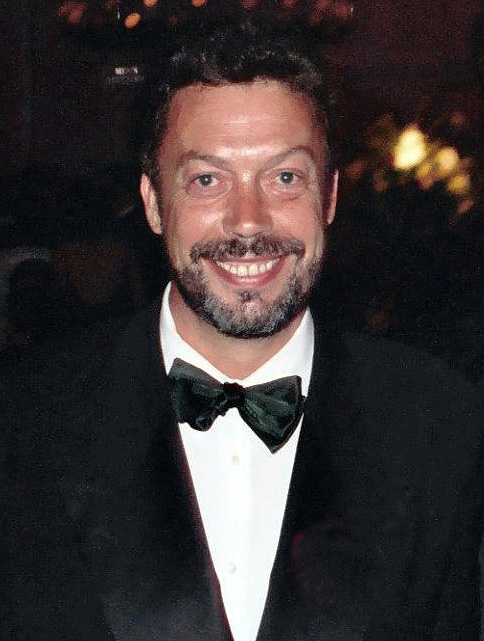
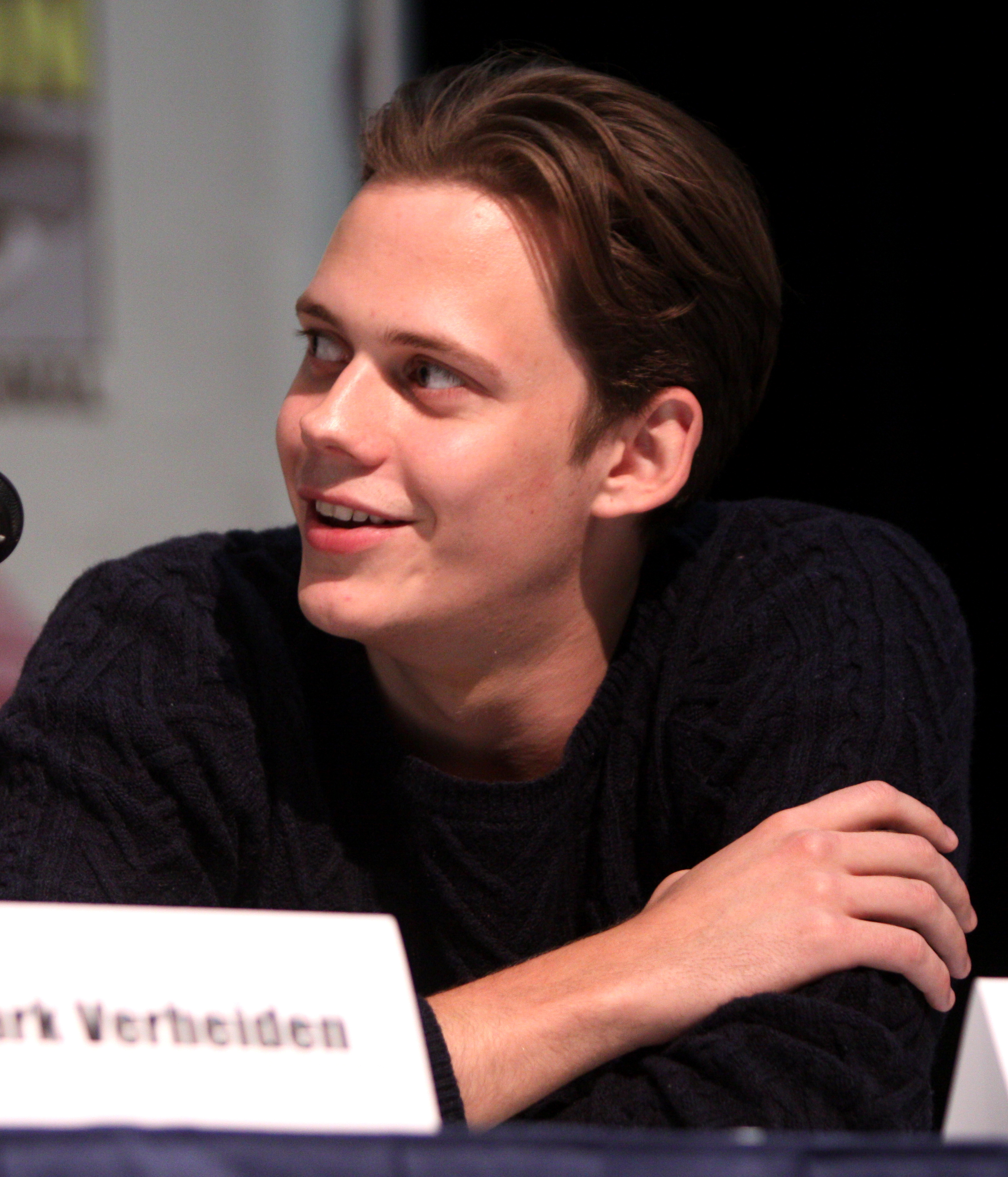
Tim Curry (left) and Bill Skarsgård's (right) performances as Pennywise in the 1990 miniseries and the two-part film adaptations, respectively, received widespread critical acclaim.

A survey by the University of South Wales indicated that movie clowns such as Pennywise or the Joker contribute at least partially to some people's coulrophobia. While the creature takes many forms, critics such as Currie note that Pennywise is the most memorable. Some scholars suggest that Pennywise's shapeshifting reflects deep psychological anxieties, thus subverting the clown's traditional role as a figure of fun. The character was suggested as a possible motive for two 2014 incidents of people dressing up as clowns in Northampton, England and Staten Island, New York, US. The Atlantic said of the character: "The scariest thing about Pennywise, though, is how he preys on children's deepest fears, manifesting the monsters they're most petrified by." British scholar Mikita Brottman has called the miniseries version of Pennywise "one of the most frightening of evil clowns to appear on the small screen" and that it "reflects every social and familial horror known to contemporary America". Writer James Smythe wrote that Curry's performance as Pennywise largely contributed to the character's enduring fame. Sophie Gilbert of The Atlantic wrote that "the contrast between his comical yellow dungarees and his penchant for ripping off children's limbs is fairly stark." Kristy Strouse called Curry's portrayal as "zany" yet disturbing, also noting the quality of the character's makeup, costumes, and practical effects. Reviewer John J. O'Connor of the New York Times also praised Curry's performance and described it as "lip-smacking".

Rolling Stone's David Fear praised Skarsgård's performance in 2019 as a "phobic masterpiece", adding that "onscreen, he feels like he's burrowing into your psyche". Fellow Rolling Stone reviewer Peter Travers describes Skarsgård's Pennywise as "all [the Losers'] fears rolled up into one creepy, dancing clown". Even Skarsgård and Stephen King themselves were scared by the character, with Skarsgård telling Entertainment Weekly that he started seeing the character in his dreams after filming and King saying in a Reddit post that he would not revisit the It story (and thus, Pennywise) because it was "too scary, even for me." He later reiterated this in an interview with Bloody Disgusting.

Audiences and critics reacted to the 2017 and 2019 film adaptations of It with a mix of fear and fascination; reviewer Katie Kilkenny of Pacific Standard felt that clowns "remain[ing] forever terrifying" was one of the key reasons for the 2017 film's success. Other reviewers offered more varied appraisals. Christopher Orr of The Atlantic says that Skarsgård's Pennywise was less "overtly clownlike" than Curry's was, and thus less memorable. The Chicago Sun-Times' Richard Roeper described Pennywise as "a little less frightening" in 2019 than in 2017, but also praised Skarsgård's performance as "disturbingly effective". Tom Russo of The Boston Globe called the character "supremely creepy" in his review of It Chapter Two.

Gompf's examining of Pennywise's appeal found that a subset of viewers expressed an attraction or affinity toward Skarsgård's Pennywise. She saw this as the result of either the actor himself or a broader pop-culture trend of romanticizing charismatic anti-heroes such as Loki or Hannibal Lecter. Gompf also noted that fans were debating the appeal of Pennywise's new design amongst themselves; early promotional images of Skarsgård in costume divided fans over whether the character was too frightening or not frightening enough. She said that in particular, Pennywise's visual aesthetic, facial expressions, and posture helped create a sense of dread in viewers.

Chris Evangelista for /Film criticized It: Welcome to Derry's attempt to answer every mystery that is presented about the character, and believed that it was not necessary to reveal Pennywise's origin since "things like that should defy a reasonable explanation". He saw Pennywise more as a "shape-shifting creature" that "enhances the show" with a higher variety of scares. Chris Hayner of Polygon said he was more interested in the lore of Derry and the influence of Pennywise on the town than in the films.

=== Analysis ===
Several scholars have interpreted Pennywise as a cultural metaphor for real-world anxieties of the time the story takes place. Scholar Whitney S. May writes that Pennywise's return in the films reflects a broader resurgence of the "evil clown" figure in popular culture. Fernando Gabriel Pagnoni Berns similarly sees the character as an embodiment of the 1980s moral panics, resurfacing once every generation to scare adults and children. Independent scholar Erin Giannini writes in an essay that Pennywise embodies the fear of stranger danger, a fear that spans generations and is not tied to a specific era. Academic Margaret J. Yankovich also interprets Pennywise as a representation of personal or historical trauma that must be confronted. Writer Keith Currie describes Pennywise's shapeshifting into iconic horror villains such as Count Dracula as "a dark love-letter to the genre" and considers Pennywise as one of King's most memorable creations. (Note: In the novel, Pennywise shapeshifts into several creatures from older horror stories that the Losers are familiar with, such as Count Dracula as well as the titular creature from Creature from the Black Lagoon, among others. These scenes were largely cut from the films.)

Literary scholars have observed that It uses Pennywise to represent the collective evil of Derry. Stephen King scholar Tony Magistrale says that the novel shows how Derry "institutionalize[s] child abuse" so much that "Pennywise's actions merely reflect the town's general indifference towards its children." In this sense, the clown is a mirror to the town's worst impulses. Critic Adrian Daub of the Los Angeles Review of Books notes that King does not distinguish between the supernatural horrors committed by Pennywise and the everyday evils displayed by the town's residents, such as racism. These mundane cruelties are not simply caused by Pennywise, but are a replica of his nature; the novel frequently draws direct comparisons between Derry and the creature. Polygon writer Chris Hayner wrote that the evils shown in the people of Derry are also present in It: Welcome to Derry, writing "the terror here isn't directly related to the actions of Pennywise, though he remains plenty terrifying". He praised the fact that Pennywise terrorized Derry and controlled the townspeople indirectly rather than directly. University of Technology Sydney associate professor Penny Crofts writes that the Derry townspeople are somewhat complicit in Pennywise's crimes through their inaction and inability to stop the creature. She cites the homophobic murder of Adrian Mellon at the start of the book as an example. Crofts compares the case of Pennywise to real-life convicted sex offender Larry Nassar, writing that both Pennywise and Nassar were shielded by the people around them while they committed crimes "with seeming impunity".

Yankovich also interprets Pennywise as both the origin and embodiment of the recurring evil seen in Derry, symbolizing a primordial source of fear and death. This, she argues, is reinforced by the Losers' vision in the smoke-hole ceremony, where they witness the character crash-landing in Derry. According to Falakata College assistant professor Diganta Roy, Pennywise and Derry act as mirrors of the hatred and psychotic rage of the Derry townspeople. Yankovich observes that Pennywise naturally takes the form of a child's worst fear; for example, Pennywise appears to Eddie (a germaphobe) in the form of a leper, a physical manifestation of contamination and disease, or in other words, abjection.

Hannah Lina Schneeberger and Maria Wiegel from the University of Cologne argue that although Stephen King never cited John Wayne Gacy as an influence for Pennywise, that the two of them reflect the 1980s American ethos. They point to the interconnectedness of Pennywise, Gacy, and the white middle-class suburb of Derry as a representation of broader American society. Derry is a homogeneous place that represses things which its townspeople see as undesirable using racism and bigotry; hence, according to them, Pennywise reflects the anxieties faced by his victims. Both Pennywise and Gacy's clown personas present the illusion of a friendly, everyday clown while concealing something far more sinister. Schneeberger and Wiegel argue that Pennywise embodies not just Derry, but each of its neighborhoods and sub-communities. On a related note, Giannini believes that Pennywise embodies the fear of stranger danger. Pagnoni Berns concludes in his essay that Pennywise feeds from the fears of the people of Derry much like moral panics do throughout history.

Scholars have also explored deeper themes behind Pennywise's defeat. Roy also contends that Pennywise's defeat carries dual meaning; it portrays the Losers as child heroes that challenge the very social norms aimed to protect them, and it marks a turning point in the Losers' transition into adulthood. In this view, Pennywise is a coping mechanism to help the Losers find a sense of belonging. In It Chapter Two, the Losers confront the creature not with physical weapons but by standing up to Pennywise and mocking him, reducing him from a monstrous figure to a withered shell; Pennywise draws strength from fear and imagination, and is therefore weak against those who have overcome their fears.

== See also ==
- Woh – Indian horror series

== Bibliography ==
=== Books ===
Ambrose, Jeff (2022). "Memory as Monster: Remembering and Forgetting in Stephen King's It". In May, Whitney S. (ed.). Encountering Pennywise: Critical Perspectives on Stephen King's IT. Jackson: University Press of Mississippi. pp. 135–147. ISBN 978-1-4968-4224-4.

Brottman, Mikita (2004). Funny Peculiar: Gershon Legman and the Psychopathology of Humor. London, England: Routledge. ISBN 0-88163-404-2.

Crofts, Penny (2022). "The Townspeople of Derry in Stephen King's It: Bystanders and Responsibility of Evil". Encountering Pennywise: Critical Perspectives on Stephen King's IT. Jackson: University Press of Mississippi. pp. 115–134. ISBN 978-1-4968-4224-4.

Currie, Keith (2022). "Not Falling Apart in the Face of Horror: Abjection and Base Matter in Stephen King's It". In May, Whitney S. (ed.). Encountering Pennywise: Critical Perspectives on Stephen King's IT. Jackson: University Press of Mississippi. pp. 93–110. ISBN 978-1-4968-4224-4.

Giannini, Erin (2022). "Remembering Half-Forgotten Memories of Derry: The Moral Panics of the 1980s". In May, Whitney S. (ed.). Encountering Pennywise: Critical Perspectives on Stephen King's IT. Jackson: University Press of Mississippi. pp. 29–42. ISBN 978-1-4968-4224-4.

Gompf, Michelle (2020). "The Disturbing Appeal of Pennywise". In Riekki, Ron (ed.). The Many Lives of It: Essays on the Stephen King Horror Franchise (Amazon Kindle ed.). McFarland. Location 2492–2720. ISBN 978-1476680187.

King, Stephen (1986). IT (Amazon Kindle ed.). New York, NY: Viking. ISBN 978-0-670-81302-5.

Magistrale, Tony (2003). Hollywood's Stephen King (1st ed.). London, England: Palgrave Macmillan. ISBN 978-0-312-29320-8.

Magistrale, Tony (2010). Stephen King: America's storyteller. Santa Barbara, Calif: Praeger. ISBN 978-0-313-35228-7.

May, Whitney S. (2022). Encountering Pennywise: Critical Perspectives on Stephen King's IT. Jackson: University Press of Mississippi. pp. 3–12. ISBN 978-1-4968-4224-4.

Pagnoni Berns, Fernando Gabriel (2022). "Remembering Half-Forgotten Memories of Derry: The Moral Panics of the 1980s". In May, Whitney S. (ed.). Encountering Pennywise: Critical Perspectives on Stephen King's IT. Jackson: University Press of Mississippi. pp. 15–28. ISBN 978-1-4968-4224-4.

Radford, Benjamin (2016). Bad Clowns. Albuquerque, New Mexico: University of New Mexico Press. ISBN 978-0-8263-5667-3.

Roy, Diganta (2022). "Floating Fears: Understanding Childhood Traumascapes in Stephen King's It". In May, Whitney S. (ed.). Encountering Pennywise: Critical Perspectives on Stephen King's IT. Jackson: University Press of Mississippi. pp. 43–59. ISBN 978-1-4968-4224-4.

Schneeberger, Hannah Lina; Wiegel, Maria (2022). "Goodbye Pogo: Pennywise and the Serial Murder of the American Dream". In May, Whitney S. (ed.). Encountering Pennywise: Critical Perspectives on Stephen King's IT. Jackson: University Press of Mississippi. pp. 167–181. ISBN 978-1-4968-4224-4.

Yankovich, Margaret J. (2022). ""A Sudden Upheaval of Beauty or Terror": Body Horror and Abjection in Stephen King's It". In May, Whitney S. (ed.). Encountering Pennywise: Critical Perspectives on Stephen King's IT. Jackson: University Press of Mississippi. pp. 63–77. ISBN 978-1-4968-4224-4.

=== Websites ===
Alter, Ethan (November 17, 2015). "Back to Derry: An Oral History of 'Stephen King's It'". Yahoo!. Archived from the original on March 30, 2017.

Amos, Steve (September 3, 2017). "Stephen King's IT – The Book Vs The 1990 TV Miniseries". Film89. Archived from the original on August 15, 2025.

Andreeva, Nellie (May 30, 2024). "'Welcome To Derry': Bill Skarsgård To Reprise Pennywise Role In 'It' Prequel On Max". Deadline Hollywood. Archived from the original on May 30, 2024.

Barkan, Jonathan (August 25, 2017). "IT Miniseries Makeup Artist Bart Mixon Talks Working With Tim Curry and His Pennywise Design". Dread Central. Archived from the original on July 18, 2025.

Bowman, Kristen (June 6, 2018). "FASHION, FILM AND A FLAIR FOR THE DRAMATICS". The Brenau Collaborative. Archived from the original on December 16, 2025.

Breznican, Anthony (January 9, 2018). "Pennywise haunts the dreams of 'It' actor Bill Skarsgård". EW.com. Entertainment Weekly. Archived from the original on February 12, 2025.

Cranswick, Amie (August 25, 2017). "New poster for Stephen King's It, director discusses Pennywise design". Flickering Myth.

Daub, Adrian (September 11, 2016). "Where "It" Was: Rereading Stephen King's "It" on Its 30th Anniversary". Los Angeles Review of Books. Archived from the original on September 5, 2025.

Evangelista, Chris (October 22, 2025). "It: Welcome To Derry Review: The Stephen King Prequel Series Is Surprisingly Scary And Gruesome". /Film. Archived from the original on October 26, 2025.

Evry, Max (July 27, 2017). "IT Set Visit Takes Us Back to King Country". Coming Soon. Archived from the original on January 12, 2021.

Foutch, Haleigh (September 6, 2019). "Pennywise Explained: What Exactly Is Stephen King's IT?". Collider.

Gage, Clint (September 14, 2019). "It Chapter Two: The Biggest Book to Movie Differences". IGN. Archived from the original on August 11, 2025.

Gelmini, David (March 11, 2020). "Pennywise Will Appear In Space Jam 2". Dread Central. Archived from the original on August 1, 2020.

Gilbert, Sophie (November 18, 2015). "25 Years of Pennywise the Clown". The Atlantic. Archived from the original on May 18, 2017.

Gilman, Greg (June 20, 2013). "7 Things We Learned About Stephen King From Reddit". TheWrap. Archived from the original on December 14, 2025.

Hayner, Chris (October 22, 2025). "It: Welcome to Derry is a fantastic Stephen King adaptation". Polygon. Archived from the original on December 16, 2025.

Jacobs, Eammon (January 3, 2025). "Bill Skarsgard is returning to play Pennywise for the 3rd time. Here's everything we know about 'IT: Welcome to Derry.'". Business Insider. Archived from the original on August 17, 2025.

Kilkenny, Katie (September 12, 2017). "The Paranoid Fantasy at the Heart of 'It'". Pacific Standard. Archived from the original on August 7, 2025.

King, Stephen (2009). "IT Inspiration". StephenKing.com. Archived from the original on May 14, 2019.

Lash, Jolie (September 22, 2021). "Director Cary Fukunaga explains high-profile departures from True Detective and It". EW.com. Archived from the original on December 16, 2025.

Miska, Brad (July 19, 2017). "Here's Why Bill Skarsgård Was Cast as Pennywise in 'IT'". Bloody Disgusting. Archived from the original on July 19, 2017.

Righetti, Jamie (September 8, 2017). "'It': The Six Most Important Differences Between the Film and Stephen King's Book". IndieWire. Archived from the original on July 31, 2025.

Roeper, Richard (September 3, 2019). "'It Chapter Two' a good scare, but not as good as the first one". Chicago Sun-Times. Archived from the original on September 3, 2019.

Romano, Nick (October 16, 2025). "'Welcome to Derry': On set of the 'It' prequel tracing Pennywise's origins (exclusive)". EW.com. Archived from the original on October 18, 2025.

Rouse, Isaac (October 17, 2025). "It: Welcome to Derry is taking a cue from Jaws". Polygon. Archived from the original on December 16, 2025.

Scott, Ryan (August 22, 2016). "Why Stephen King Had Nothing to Do with the IT Movie". MovieWeb. Archived from the original on August 30, 2017.

Squires, John (July 15, 2016). "Rare Photo Shows Curry Unused Pennywise Concept Makeup". Dread Central. Archived from the original on June 7, 2019.

Squires, John (June 3, 2022). "Stephen King on the Future of Pennywise: 'I Have No Intention of Going Back to It'". Bloody Disgusting. Archived from the original on December 16, 2025.

Squires, John (May 20, 2025). "'Welcome to Derry' Trailer Heads to 1962 and Brings Bill Skarsgård's Pennywise Back to Life". Bloody Disgusting!. Archived from the original on May 21, 2025.

Stableford, Dylan (March 25, 2014). "Pennywise, the clown foolish?". Yahoo!. Archived from the original on September 2, 2017.

Strouse, Kristy (October 12, 2021). "Haunt-tober Day 11: It (1990)". Wonderfully Weird & Horrifying. Archived from the original on June 18, 2024.

VanHoose, Benjamin (November 13, 2024). "Bill Skarsgård Had 'Weird' Dreams of Being Pennywise the Clown Stalking His Hometown After Filming It Movies". People.com. Archived from the original on June 21, 2025.

Weiss, Josh (August 8, 2022). "We all float down here: Cast & crew of 'IT' miniseries reflect on Tim Curry's Pennywise in wake of new documentary". Syfy. Archived from the original on December 16, 2025.

Yahoo Movies Staff (August 16, 2016). "'It' First Look: A New Close-Up of Pennywise's Creepy Costume". Yahoo! Movies. Archived from the original on August 24, 2016.

=== Magazines and journals ===
Amenabar, Teddy (October 30, 2023). "Why are some people so afraid of clowns?". Washington Post. Archived from the original on July 4, 2024.

Brathwaite, Lester Fabian (April 2, 2023). "Not It: Bill Skarsgård 'not currently involved' in Pennywise prequel, offers advice to next clown". Entertainment Weekly. Archived from the original on April 7, 2025.

Collis, Clark (September 30, 2022). "'The Stephen King Ultimate Companion' book: The most interesting things we learned". Entertainment Weekly. Archived from the original on March 8, 2025.

Cruz, Gilbert (November 3, 2009). "It | Stephen King on His 10 Longest Novels". TIME. ISSN 0040-781X. Archived from the original on December 14, 2025.

Fear, David (September 4, 2019). "'It: Chapter Two' — In Praise of Pennywise". Rolling Stone. Archived from the original on September 14, 2025.

Kroll, Justin (June 2, 2016). "'It' Reboot Taps 'Hemlock Grove' Star Bill Skarsgard to Play Pennywise the Clown". Variety. Archived from the original on June 5, 2016.

Mangan, Lucy (October 27, 2025). "It: Welcome to Derry review – the demonic, liver-eating baby in this Stephen King prequel is horrifying". The Guardian. ISSN 0261-3077. Archived from the original on December 14, 2025.

Mercer, Erin (April 2019). "The Difference Between World and Want: Adulthood and the Horrors of History in Stephen King's It". The Journal of Popular Culture. 52 (2): 315–329. doi:10.1111/jpcu.12786. ISSN 0022-3840.

O'Connor, John J. (November 16, 1990). "Stephen King's Mad Clown Returns". The New York Times. p. 102. ISSN 0362-4331.

Orr, Christopher (September 8, 2017). "'It' Is a Solid but Conventional Shocker". The Atlantic. Archived from the original on September 9, 2017.

Russo, Tom (September 5, 2019). "'It Chapter Two' is just as scary as chapter one - The Boston Globe". BostonGlobe.com. Archived from the original on September 9, 2019.

Smythe, James (May 28, 2013). "Rereading Stephen King, chapter 21: It". The Guardian. ISSN 0261-3077. Archived from the original on November 4, 2015.

Travers, Peter (September 6, 2017). "'It': Stephen King's Psycho-Clown Epic 'Is the Stuff of Nightmares'". Rolling Stone. Archived from the original on December 12, 2025.

Tucker, Ken (November 16, 1990). "It review: Tim Curry as Pennywise in Stephen King adaptation". Entertainment Weekly. Archived from the original on April 13, 2019.
