= Georgie Denbrough =

Fictional character from It

- It character
- Jackson Robert Scott as Georgie in the 2017 film adaptation of It
- First appearance: It (1986)
- Last appearance: It Chapter Two (2019)
- Created by: Stephen King
- Portrayed by: 1990 TV miniseries: Tony Dakota; Theatrical film series: Jackson Robert Scott

In-universe information
- Full name: George Elmer Denbrough
- Family: Zack Denbrough (father); Sharon Denbrough (mother); Bill Denbrough (older brother)
- Home: Derry, Maine, United States
- Nationality: American

George Elmer "Georgie" Denbrough is a fictional character created by Stephen King in his 1986 epic horror novel It. Georgie is the younger brother of Bill Denbrough, and is killed by Pennywise the Clown. He is used by Pennywise to taunt Bill throughout the novel. Georgie is portrayed by Tony Dakota in the 1990 TV miniseries adaptation and Jackson Robert Scott in the theatrical film series. Dakota also reprised his role for a 2019 short fan film based on the 1990 TV miniseries adaptation, titled Georgie, which imagines if Georgie had survived. He returns in the 1998 TV series Woh, where he is portrayed by Prashant Rane.

== Fictional character biography ==
George Elmer Denbrough was born on September 18, 1951 (1953 in the 1990 TV miniseries and 1981 in the 2017 theatrical film adaptation) to Zack and Sharon Denbrough. He is the younger brother of Bill Denbrough, with whom he has a very positive relationship, considering him to be his best friend.

=== Encounter with Pennywise ===
On a rainy day in October 1957 (1960 in the 1990 TV miniseries and 1988 in the theatrical film series), Bill helps Georgie make a paper boat, as Bill is too sick to accompany Georgie outside. As Georgie goes out alone, the boat falls down a storm drain. In the drain, Georgie encounters the clown Pennywise, who offers him a red balloon and tells him how people float down in the sewers. Pennywise offers Georgie his boat back, but when Georgie attempts to reach for it, Pennywise grabs Georgie's arm and bites it off, leaving Georgie bleeding to death in the rain. In the theatrical film series, Georgie is instead dragged down the sewers while, after his right arm is dismembered, calling Bill's name.

=== Being used by Pennywise ===
Shortly after his death, Georgie's appearance is utilized by Pennywise to taunt and provoke Bill. While this aspect of the novel is not represented in the 1990 TV miniseries, Georgie appears to Bill several times throughout the theatrical film series.

== Adaptations ==
=== 1990 TV miniseries ===
Georgie Denbrough was portrayed by Tony Dakota in the 1990 TV miniseries adaptation. This iteration remains faithful to the source material, however, Georgie is killed by Pennywise off-screen.

=== Theatrical film series ===
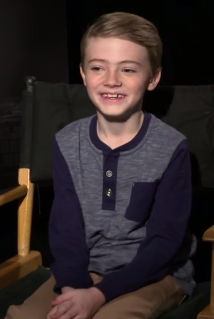
Jackson Robert Scott (pictured in 2018) portrayed Georgie in the theatrical film series

Georgie Denbrough was portrayed by Jackson Robert Scott in the 2017 film adaptation of the King novel as well as its 2019 sequel. This adaptation of the character features the onscreen demise of Georgie as well as showing more of Pennywise using Georgie to affect Bill psychologically. Behind the scenes of the 2017 film, the young actor stated that he was not afraid of Bill Skarsgård as Pennywise and formed a bond with the actor. Scott's performance as Georgie was acclaimed by fans and critics.

The violent nature of Georgie's death (in the 2017 film adaptation) received a polarizing response from critics. While most people felt that the graphic nature of Georgie's death was necessary to show the danger of Pennywise, some viewers felt that Pennywise ripping a child's arm off and watching him attempt to crawl away was "downright disturbing" and "too graphic".

=== 2019 short fan film ===
Georgie Denbrough is the main character of Georgie, a 2019 short fan film based on the 1990 TV miniseries adaptation of the novel; Tony Dakota reprised his role as the title character. This short fan film shows an undead adult Georgie (being resurrected through drawing). This is the only adaptation to show Georgie as an adult.

== Analysis ==
Throughout the novel and theatrical film series, Pennywise uses the "ghost of Georgie" to play on Bill's survivor guilt. This is further explored in It Chapter Two (where Bill blames himself for Georgie's death), exemplified in a scene in which the adult Bill returns to the storm drain where Georgie was murdered. The scene progresses into a flashback where Pennywise's disembodied voice taunts Bill for not being present with Georgie when he died. The adult Bill struggles with post-traumatic stress disorder and attempts unsuccessfully to prevent Pennywise from killing another young boy. Georgie has also been seen as an interpretation of the way children are lured by predators.

== In popular culture ==
The character is repeatedly referenced by American heavy metal and metallic hardcore band Ice Nine Kills in their 2019 song "It Is The End" (which is based upon and inspired by the 2017 film adaptation of the novel, and part of an album featuring songs inspired by horror films). The scene where Georgie meets Pennywise (in the 1990 TV miniseries adaptation) has become an internet meme, with variations depicting Pennywise attempting to tempt Georgie to enter the sewers with different things. Georgie is also referenced in King's novel 11/22/63.
