= List of guest stars on 21 Jump Street =

The following is a list of notable television and film personalities who made guest appearances on the Fox crime drama 21 Jump Street. Several played characters who were friends with members of the 21 Jump Street program, or were romantically linked to them, while others served as ″obstacles.″

== Season 1 ==
Actor	Character	Season No.	Episode No.	Episode Title
Barney Martin	Charlie	1	1	"Jump Street Chapel"/"Pilot"
Brandon Douglas	Kenny Weckerle	1	1 & 2	"Jump Street Chapel"/"Pilot"
Reginald T. Dorsey	Tyrell "Waxer" Thompson	1	1 & 2	"Jump Street Chapel"/"Pilot"
Billy Jayne	Mark Dorian	1	3	"America, What a Town"
Steve Antin	Stevie Delano	1	3	"America, What a Town"
Traci Lind	Nadia	1	3	"America, What a Town"
Leah Ayres	Susan Chadwick	1	4	"Don't Pet the Teacher"
Geoffrey Blake	Jeffrey Stone	1	4	"Don't Pet the Teacher"
Tony Mockus, Jr.	Principal Weintraub	1	4	"Don't Pet the Teacher"
Josh Brolin	Taylor Rolator	1	5	"My Future's So Bright, I Gotta Wear Shades"
Jamie Bozian	Kurt Niles	1	5	"My Future's So Bright, I Gotta Wear Shades"
John D'Aquino	Vinny Morgan	1	5	"My Future's So Bright, I Gotta Wear Shades"
Norman Alden	Weston	1	5	"My Future's So Bright, I Gotta Wear Shades"
Troy Byer	Patty Blatcher	1	6	"The Worst Night of Your Life"
Lezlie Deane	Jane Kinney	1	6	"The Worst Night of Your Life"
Blair Underwood	Reginald Brooks	1	7	"Gotta Finish the Riff"
Robert Picardo	Ralph Buckley	1	7	"Gotta Finish the Riff"
Scott Schwartz	Jordan Simms	1	8	"Bad Influence"
Liane Curtis	Lauren Carlson	1	8	"Bad Influence"
Byron Thames	Dylan Taylor	1	8	"Bad Influence"
Sherilyn Fenn	Diane Nelson	1	9	"Blindsided"
Courtney Gains	Birch	1	9	"Blindsided"
Harold Pruett	Elly	1	9	"Blindsided"
Christopher Heyerdahl	Jake	1	10	"Next Generation"
Stephen Gregory	Hoagy Deleplant	1	10	"Next Generation"
Andy Romano	Tony Delaplant	1	10	"Next Generation"
Kurtwood Smith	Spencer Phillips	1	11	"Low and Away"
David Raynr	Kipling "Kip" Fuller	1	12	"16 Blown to 35"
Sarah G. Buxton	Trina	1	12	"16 Blown to 35"
Jason Priestley	Tober	1	13	"Mean Streets and Pastel Houses"

== Season 2 ==
Actor	Character	Season No.	Episode No.	Episode Title
Kurtwood Smith	Spencer Phillips	2	1	"In the Custody of a Clown"
Ray Walston	Judge Desmond	2	1	"In the Custody of a Clown"
Barney Martin	Edison Coulter	2	1	"In the Custody of a Clown"
Jason Priestley	Brian Krompasick	2	4	"Two for the Road"
Pauly Shore	Kenny Ryan	2	4	"Two for the Road"
Reginald T. Dorsey	Tyrell "Waxer" Thompson	2	9	"You Oughta Be in Prison"
Shannon Tweed	Jody Kleinman	2	9	"You Oughta Be in Prison"
Lochlyn Munro	Derek	2	9	"You Oughta Be in Prison"
Mindy Cohn	Rosa	2	11	"Christmas in Saigon"
Kent McCord	Tom Hanson, Sr.	2	14	"Chapel of Love"
Mindy Cohn	Rosa	2	14	"Chapel of Love"
Don S. Davis	Frank	2	14	"Chapel of Love"
Tom Wright	Judy's Date	2	14	"Chapel of Love"
Jean Sagal	Betty Sue Fitzgerald	2	14	"Chapel of Love"
Liz Sagal	Mary Lou Fitzgerald	2	14	"Chapel of Love"
Deborah Lacey	Lynette Johnson	2	14	"Chapel of Love"
Bradford English	Charlie	2	14	"Chapel of Love"
Brandon Douglas	Kenny Weckerle	2	15	"I′m OK — You Need Work"
Christina Applegate	Tina	2	15	"I′m OK — You Need Work"
Peter Berg	Jerome Sawyer	2	17	"Champagne High"
Gabriel Jarret	Ricky	2	17	"Champagne High"
Bruce French	Brother Williams	2	18	"Brother Hanson & the Miracle of Renner′s Pond"
Dann Florek	Jim Crawford	2	18	"Brother Hanson & the Miracle of Renner′s Pond"
Gregory Itzin	Principal Garner	2	18	"Brother Hanson & the Miracle of Renner′s Pond"
Brad Pitt	Peter	2	20	"Best Years of Your Life"
Don S. Davis	Principal	2	22	"School′s Out"
Sam Anderson	Dan Finger	2	22	"School′s Out"

== Season 3 ==
Actor	Character	Season No.	Episode No.	Episode Title
Leo Rossi	Sgt. Walker	3	2	"Slippin' Into Darkness"
Tim Russ	Ray Davies	3	2	"Slippin' Into Darkness"
Peri Gilpin	Fitzgerald	3	3	"The Currency We Trade In"
Kelly Hu	Kim Van Luy	3	7	"The Dragon and the Angel"
Russell Wong	Locke	3	7	"The Dragon and the Angel"
Christopher Titus	Jack Archer	3	11	"Woolly Bullies"
Dom DeLuise	Uncle Nick	3	11	"Woolly Bullies"
Kehli O'Byrne	Carol	3	11	"Woolly Bullies"
Larenz Tate	Young Adam Fuller	3	11	"Woolly Bullies"
Maia Brewton	Maureen Maroney	3	11	"Woolly Bullies"
Michael DeLuise	Doug Penhall at Age 16	3	11	"Woolly Bullies"
Savannah Smith Boucher	Dr. St. John	3	14	"Nemesis"
Mario Van Peebles	Dana	3	16	"High High"^{*}
Bridget Fonda	Molly 'Moho' Chapman	3	17	"Blinded by the Thousand Points of Light"
Conor O'Farrell	Frank Farrell	3	19	"Loc'd Out Part 1"
Andrew Lauer	Psycho	3	19	"Loc'd Out Part 1"
Claude Brooks	Lil Monster	3	19	"Loc'd Out Part 1"
Conor O'Farrell	Frank Farrell	3	20	"Loc'd Out Part 2"
Margot Rose	D.A. Katherine Sullivan	3	20	"Loc'd Out Part 2"
Andrew Lauer	Psycho	3	20	"Loc'd Out Part 2"
Claude Brooks	Lil Monster	3	20	"Loc'd Out Part 2"

== Season 4 ==
Actor	Character	Season No.	Episode No.	Episode Title
Conor O'Farrell	Frank Farrell	4	1	"Draw the Line"
Don S. Davis	Warden	4	1	"Draw the Line"
Robert Romanus	Cadet Mortellaro	4	1	"Draw the Line"
Rob Estes	Darryl	4	2	"Say It Ain't So, Pete"
Stu Nahan	Himself	4	2	"Say It Ain't So, Pete"
Mario Van Peebles	Dancer	4	3	"Eternal Flame"^{*}
Thomas Haden Church	Tony	4	3	"Eternal Flame"
Billy Warlock	Ron Greenwood	4	4	"Come from the Shadows"
Tony Plana	Robert Mendez	4	4	"Come from the Shadows"
Julie Warner	Alice Greenwood	4	4	"Come from the Shadows"
Barbara Tarbuck	Judge	4	4	"Come from the Shadows"
Kamala Lopez	Marta	4	4	"Come from the Shadows"
Pamela Adlon	Dori	4	6	"Old Haunts in a New Age"
Christine Elise	Quincy	4	7	"Out of Control"
Robyn Lively	Helen Akerly	4	9	"Mike's P.O.V."
Vince Vaughn	Bill Peterson	4	9	"Mike's P.O.V."
Mickey Jones	Bobo	4	10	"Wheels and Deals: Part 2"
Ray Baker	Raymond Crane	4	10	"Wheels and Deals: Part 2"
Keith Coogan	Kyle DeGray	4	12	"Things We Said Today"
Shannen Doherty	Janine DeGray	4	12	"Things We Said Today"
Wallace Langham	Poole	4	13	"Research and Destroy"
Rosie Perez	Rosie Martinez	4	16	"2245"
Don S. Davis	Chapman	4	16	"2245"
Chick Hearn	Himself	4	17	"Hi Mom"
Kareem Abdul-Jabbar	Wesley Williams	4	17	"Hi Mom"
David Raynr	Kipling 'Kip' Fuller	4	17	"Hi Mom"
John Waters	Mr. Bean	4	18	"Awomp-Bomp-Aloobomb, Aloop Bamboom"
John Pyper-Ferguson	Dealer	4	18	"Awomp-Bomp-Aloobomb, Aloop Bamboom"
Diedrich Bader	Paul	4	20	"Last Chance High"
Kelly Perine	Holt	4	26	"Blackout"
Kristin Dattilo	Allison	4	26	"Blackout"

== Season 5 ==
Actor	Character	Season No.	Episode No.	Episode Title
Jennifer Copping	Mara	5	1	"Tunnel of Love"
Lisa Dean Ryan	School Girl	5	2	"Back to School"
Scott Grimes	Christopher	5	3	"Buddy System"
Brigitta Dau	Claire	5	3	"Buddy System"
Tony Dakota	Clavo	5	4	"Poison"
Perrey Reeves	Tracy Hill	5	4	"Poison"
Johannah Newmarch	Lisa	5	4	"Poison"
Richard Leacock	Jam	5	4	"Poison"
Pat Bermel	Inspector Nickerson	5	5	"Just Say No! High"
Deanna Milligan	Vanessa	5	5	"Just Say No! High"
Peter Outerbridge	Jeff Chandler	5	5	"Just Say No! High"
Tony Dakota	Clavo	5	6	"Poison"
Don MacKay	Kyle Morgan	5	6	"Poison"
John Pyper-Ferguson	Joshua, group leader	5	6	"Poison"
Terence Kelly	Edward Arbogast	5	7	"This Ain't No Summer Camp"
Merrilyn Gann	Rosalie Arbogast	5	7	"This Ain't No Summer Camp"
Ocean Hellman	Suzanne Ross	5	8	"The Girl Next Door"
Lochlyn Munro	Vince	5	8	"The Girl Next Door"
Leslie Carlson	Professor Gray	5	9	"Diplomas for Sale"
Tony Dakota	Clavo	5	10	"Number One with a Bullet"
David DeLuise	Stevenson	5	10	"Number One with a Bullet"
Kamala Lopez	Marta	5	10	"Number One with a Bullet"
Sandra P. Grant	reporter	5	10	"Number One with a Bullet"
Don S. Davis	Lt. Donnelly	5	14	"Film at Eleven"
Jennifer Copping	Melanie	5	17	"Under the Influence"
Jada Pinkett Smith	Nicole	5	21	"Homegirls"

^* Mario Van Peebles also directed these episodes.

== See also ==
- Jump Street
