= Bill Denbrough =

Fictional character from the novel It

- It character
- Jaeden Martell (left) and James McAvoy (right) as Bill Denbrough in It and It Chapter Two
- First appearance: It (1986)
- Created by: Stephen King
- Portrayed by: 1990 TV miniseries: Jonathan Brandis (child); Richard Thomas (adult); 2017 film and 2019 sequel: Jaeden Martell (child); James McAvoy (adult)

In-universe information
- Full name: William Denbrough
- Nicknames: Stuttering Bill; Big Bill; Billy (by Georgie); Billy-Boy (by Pennywise)
- Occupation: Student/Horror Writer
- Family: Zack Denbrough (father); Sharon Denbrough (mother); Georgie Denbrough (brother; deceased)
- Spouse: Audra Phillips
- Significant others: Beverly Marsh (kissed; childhood sweetheart)
- Home: Derry, Maine; London, England (novel; TV mini-series); Los Angeles, California (2019 film)

William "Bill" Denbrough is a fictional character created by Stephen King and the main protagonist of his 1986 novel It. The character is considered to be the leader of "The Losers Club" and initiates finding and killing Pennywise after it kills his younger brother Georgie. The character was first portrayed in the 1990 TV mini-series by Jonathan Brandis as a child, and by Richard Thomas as an adult. In the 2017 adaptation and its 2019 sequel, the character was portrayed by Jaeden Martell as a child and James McAvoy as an adult.

== Fictional character biography ==
Bill Denbrough was born in 1946 (1947 in the 1990 TV mini-series and January 4, 1976, in the 2017 film). He is the son of Zack and Sharon Denbrough and the older brother of Georgie Denbrough and resides in Derry, Maine. Bill has a speech impediment due to being hit by a car at the age of three; this leads to him being outcast. In late fall of 1957 (1959/spring 1960 in the TV mini-series; 1988 in the 2017 film), Bill is suffering from a cold, and he helps construct a paper boat for his younger brother Georgie to play with outside, despite the downpour of rain. Moments later, Georgie's arm is dismembered by Pennywise in a storm drain.

After this incident, in the summer of 1958 (1960 in the 1990 TV mini-series; 1989 in the 2017 film), Bill and his friends Eddie Kaspbrak, Richie Tozier and Stanley Uris all have encounters with Pennywise. Their shared encounters with Pennywise lead them to Beverly Marsh, Ben Hanscom and Mike Hanlon, forming "The Losers Club." Along the way, the group members all have more individual encounters with Pennywise and local bully Henry Bowers—who later falls under the influence of Pennywise—until they decide to head to where they believe Pennywise to be hiding, in the sewers, and believe they have killed the clown. However, they make an oath that, if Pennywise is not in fact dead, they will all return to Derry to defeat him.

In his adult life, Bill has become a successful writer and married an actress, Audra Phillips. Bill has controlled his stutter and, due to the nature of It, cannot remember Derry, Georgie, or The Losers Club. After Pennywise kills a gay man named Adrian Mellon, Bill gets a phone call from Mike Hanlon, who has remained in Derry, asking him to come back and help kill Pennywise once and for all. Each member of The Losers Club returns to Derry except for Stanley, who dies by suicide due to not being able to face his fears again. The group meets in a Chinese Restaurant where the members catch up until they realize Stanley is missing and are confronted by It.

Eventually, after each member has respective encounters with Pennywise, the group returns the sewers and performs the Ritual of Chud to reveal Pennywise's true form and be able to kill It. However, Pennywise has already taken Bill's wife Audra and put her under the influence of It's deadlights, causing her to fall into a state of catatonia. Even after defeating Pennywise, Audra remains in a catatonic state until Bill takes her on a bicycle ride, causing her to come out of her paralysis.

== Adaptations ==
=== 1990 TV miniseries ===
Bill was portrayed by Jonathan Brandis as a child and Richard Thomas as an adult in the 1990 TV miniseries directed by Tommy Lee Wallace. This interpretation remains faithful to the novel version of the character with little to no notable differences.

=== Cary Fukunaga's failed adaptation ===
In Cary Joji Fukunaga's adaptation of the novel, Bill was to be called "Will" Denbrough, rather than Bill. When Fukunaga left the project and Andy Muschietti came aboard to produce and direct, Martell was cast.

=== 2017 and 2019 films ===
Bill was portrayed again by Jaeden Martell as a child and James McAvoy as an adult in the 2017 adaptation and its 2019 sequel. In this interpretation, the sequel reveals that he pretended to be sick the day Georgie was killed, resulting in his guilt over his brother's death. The first movie depicts Bill deluding himself that Georgie is still alive to the point of causing the Losers Club to scatter following their first encounter with Pennywise at the Neibolt House. This interpretation also has Pennywise recognising Bill as a threat, attempting to barter the other Losers into sacrificing Bill to survive. The sequel has a tongue-in-cheek reference to Stephen King's main criticism, wherein he rarely has satisfying endings to his novels (ironically, many fans and critics's main criticism with the movie was that the ending was disappointing). The sequel also features Bill coming across a young boy at the drain where Georgie was killed, and learns that the boy will become Pennywise's next victim. This leads Bill to a local carnival where he follows the boy through a house of mirrors, where Pennywise murders him right in front of Bill. The young boy had also been seen earlier in the film at the Chinese restaurant as a fan of Richie, whom Richie believes is another version of Pennywise.

Audra's role in the story is removed with Pennywise instead tormenting Bill through both his guilt and being forced to watch It kill another child in front of him. Bill overcomes his personal demons while performing the Ritual of Chud. The film also deviates from the novel and the miniseries by ending with Bill and the remaining Losers retaining their memories.

=== Differences from novel ===
Neither adaptation features Bill and the rest of the Losers meeting with Maturin the Turtle – a god-like figure in the novel who is the antithesis to Pennywise. Despite not featuring Maturin, It Chapter Two does feature the Ritual of Chud as a key plot device in the film's narrative. However, the ritual is portrayed in a completely different way than in King's novel. Multiple references are still made throughout It Chapter One as well, such as the Loser's Club at the quarry stating to have seen a turtle, and Bill holding a Lego turtle in Georgie's bedroom, as well as a clay turtle being seen in a classroom in It Chapter Two. The film series also deviates from the source material by not including the Loser's Club members losing their virginity to Beverly Marsh in the sewers after defeating Pennywise for the first time. This scene was reportedly to be featured in Fukunaga's original screenplay, but was removed by Muschietti during his rewrites once he came aboard the project.

== Themes of PTSD and survivor's guilt ==
In It: Chapter Two, the element of post traumatic stress disorder is hinted at once the characters get the phone call from Mike Hanlon asking them to return to Derry. Bill is shown to have symptoms of PTSD and survivor's guilt throughout the first film as well, refusing to believe that Georgie could be dead and blaming himself for not supervising Georgie. While the rest of The Losers Club is shown to struggle with returning to Derry and are consumed with grief and fear once they receive the call from Mike, Bill is shown to have the hardest time coping with his survivor's guilt. Bill's struggles lead to his failed attempts to save another young boy from suffering the same fate as Georgie, only to be murdered by Pennywise right in front of him. Pennywise often taunts Bill for his failure to save Georgie throughout the film as well, including a scene which takes place during the events of the first film in which Bill returns to the drain where Georgie was killed and demands answers from Pennywise on why he took Georgie. The clown only retorts with "because you weren't there", in an attempt to further Bill's survivor's guilt.

== Reception ==
Denbrough's development throughout the novel and adaptations reflects the overall theme of loss of innocence. Bill's development into a maturing adult due to the loss of his brother, Georgie, and the threat of Pennywise was widely acclaimed by fans and critics. The portrayals of the character by Brandis, Martell and McAvoy were all highly praised as well for embodying the spirit of the character. Martell's portrayal in particular was noted for the more adult themes explored in the 2017 adaptation and for Martell's commitment to perfecting the character's stutter. While Brandis's portrayal of Denbrough in the 1990 TV mini-series was acclaimed, Thomas' portrayal of the adult Bill received mixed reactions from fans and critics.

The character is referenced in other Stephen King novels: 11/22/63 and Bag of Bones. In Bag of Bones, the character of Johanna is seen to be a fan of Denbrough's novels and considers him one of her favorite contemporary authors. Bill is briefly mentioned again in 11/22/63, and fellow members of the Loser's Club, Beverly Marsh and Richie Tozier make physical appearances.
