= Beverly Marsh =

Fictional character from the novel It

- It character
- Sophia Lillis (left) and Jessica Chastain (right) as Beverly Marsh in It and It Chapter Two
- First appearance: It (1986 novel)
- Created by: Stephen King
- Portrayed by: 1990 TV miniseries: Emily Perkins (young); Annette O'Toole (adult); 2017 film, 2019 sequel, and prequel series: Sophia Lillis (young); Jessica Chastain (adult)

In-universe information
- Nicknames: Bev; Bevvy; Molly Ringwald (by Richie Tozier); Beaverly (by Greta Bowie)
- Occupation: Fashion designer
- Family: Alvin Marsh (father); Elfrida Marsh (mother); Eddie Hanscom (son); Stanley Hanscom (son); Elfrida Hanscom (daughter)
- Spouses: Tom Rogan (ex-husband); Ben Hanscom (husband; TV mini-series and 2019 film)
- Significant others: Bill Denbrough (kissed; childhood sweetheart)
- Home: Derry, Maine, United States; Chicago, Illinois, United States

Beverly "Bev" Marsh is a fictional character created by Stephen King and one of the main characters of his 1986 horror novel It. The character is seen as a member of "The Losers Club" and a romantic interest of fellow members Bill Denbrough and Ben Hanscom.

In the 1990 TV miniseries adaptation, Emily Perkins portrayed her as a teenager and Annette O'Toole as an adult. In the 2017 film adaptation and its 2019 sequel It Chapter Two, Sophia Lillis portrays the teenage Bev, later reprising the role for a cameo in the season 1 finale of the television series It: Welcome to Derry; Jessica Chastain portrays the adult Bev in It Chapter Two.

== Fictional character biography ==
Beverly Marsh was born in 1947 (1976 in the 2017 version). She is the daughter of Alvin and Elfrida Marsh. Her mother's presence in her life differs among the three continuities.

Beverly is a classmate of Ben Hanscom, who harbors a secret crush on her. Ben writes her an anonymous love poem which states, "your hair is winter fire, January embers, my heart burns there too." Beverly is led to believe that the poem was written by Bill Denbrough, who grows up to be a professional writer.

Beverly eventually joins "The Losers Club" and befriends Eddie Kaspbrak, Richie Tozier, Mike Hanlon and Stanley Uris. Beverly has her first encounter with Pennywise in her bathroom when she hears voices coming from her sink chanting "We All Float Down Here". A balloon-like construct begins growing from her sink and bursts, covering her bathroom with blood. Beverly's screams attract the attention of her father, who cannot see the blood. She confides in The Losers Club, who can all see the blood and help her clean the bathroom.

The Losers Club eventually are chased into the sewers by Henry Bowers under the influence of Pennywise. After the group finds and finishes off the clown, they find themselves lost. After they escape the sewers, the Losers make a blood oath that if Pennywise hasn't been defeated, they will all return to Derry to finish him.

In her adulthood, due to the power of Pennywise and the town of Derry, Beverly forgets about The Losers Club and her childhood. She becomes a fashion designer and enters an abusive relationship with her husband, Tom Rogan. After she gets a call from Mike asking her to return to Derry, she stands up to Tom and finally leaves the relationship. She returns to Derry and reunites with The Losers Club. Beverly returns to her old home, now inhabited by an old woman named Mrs. Kersh, who informs her that her father has been deceased for five years. She apologises and begins to leave, only to be invited in by Mrs. Kersh for tea. However, Mrs. Kersh is revealed to be a form of Pennywise and Beverly escapes. She reunites with Ben, and shares a romantic encounter with him, but Ben realises that Beverly is another form of Pennywise. The Losers Club return to the sewers to face Pennywise for the final time. Unfortunately, the confrontation results in Eddie's death, but the Losers are able to overcome and kill Pennywise. After the confrontation, Ben is finally able to confess his feelings for Beverly, and they begin a relationship.

== Adaptations ==
Beverly is portrayed in the 1990 TV miniseries by Emily Perkins as a child and Annette O'Toole as an adult. This interpretation remains fairly faithful to the novel. Perkins' portrayal of Beverly was met with a relatively positive reception, but O'Toole's portrayal was met with a more negative one.

The portrayal of Beverly in the 2017 film and its 2019 sequel by Sophia Lillis as a child and Jessica Chastain as an adult were much more positively received. This interpretation shows Beverly as being the moral compass of The Losers Club and playing a key role in defeating Pennywise in both films.

In the novel, Beverly was born in 1947. However, in the TV mini-series she was born in 1948 and in 1976 in the film adaptions.

Her mother Elfrida is present in the novel, but she is mostly too preoccupied with her job to be much of a parent to Beverly; however, she does have concerns about her husband Alvin abusing her daughter, and even asked Beverly one time if her father has ever "touched" her.

A flashback in the 2019 film reveals that her mother has died when Beverly was young; her death is implied to have been suicide due to mental illness, possibly postpartum depression. Alvin blames Beverly for her mother's death, and abuses her physically and sexually throughout her childhood.

In It: Welcome to Derry, Beverly's mother commits suicide in October 1988 at the Juniper Hills Asylum. Ingrid Kersh, also a patient at the asylum, tells the grieving Beverly, played once again by Sophia Lillis, that no one really dies in Derry.

During production of the 2017 film, actress Chloë Grace Moretz was a frontrunner for the role of Beverly. However as the project remained in development hell, the actress eventually became too old to play the role of a child. Eventually, Moretz became attached to a different Stephen King adaptation in the role of Carrie White for the 2013 remake of Carrie.

== Appearances in other King stories ==
Beverly appears in a brief cameo in King's novel 11/22/63. In the novel, she appears dancing with Richie Tozier preparing for a talent show a few months after fighting Pennywise. The two are approached by time-traveller Jake Epping, who enquires about the Dunning family. Afterwards he teaches the two how to dance properly. However, this meeting is erased by the end of the novel as Epping removes his mark on history.

== Reception ==
The characterization of Beverly in King's novel has received acclaim from critics. Lillis was nominated for multiple awards for her portrayal of the character, including a Saturn Award for Best Performance by a Younger Actor, a MTV Movie & TV Award for Best Scared-As-Shit Performance, and a Teen Choice Award for Breakout Movie Star. Lillis was also nominated for Breakthrough Artist by the San Diego Film Critics Society and for Best Youth Performance by Seattle Film Critics Society and by the Washington D.C. Area Film Critics Association.

== Analysis ==
=== Controversy ===
The scene in the novel where preteen Beverly has sex with the rest of the members of The Losers Club in the sewers of Derry after defeating Pennywise for the first time has become one of the more controversial events in the novel. The scene was omitted from Andy Muschietti's film series as well as the 1990 miniseries. The scene was reportedly meant to take place in Cary Joji Fukunaga's original screenplay, but was removed once Muschietti became involved. O'Toole has admitted to disliking the removal of the Losers' orgy scene in the miniseries: "This was their greatest attachment to one another – she thought they were all going to die, and this was a gift she was giving to each one of them, and I thought it was the most beautiful, generous love-filled gift, and it tied them all together in such an amazing way."

=== Depiction of abuse victims ===
Throughout the novel, Beverly is consistently abused by the men in her life. As a child, she is physically abused by her father, Alvin. As an adult, due to the repressed memories of Derry, she marries Tom Rogan, who is physically, sexually, and emotionally abusive towards her. The abuse Beverly faced at the hands of her father has been described as one of the more disturbing elements of the novel due to the realistic undertones.

=== Loss of innocence ===
As with Bill Denbrough, Beverly reflects the novel's themes of maturity and loss of innocence. While this is most blatantly noticeable in the controversial sexual encounters in the sewers, Beverly also faces maturity in different ways throughout the novel. Beverly is struggling with her budding womanhood, and is beginning to deal with different problems. This is more explicitly shown in the 2017 film adaptation, where Beverly attempts to purchase tampons from the local pharmacy. In this scene, Beverly first encounters Bill, Eddie and Stan. Beverly comes across the boys in an attempt to avoid Greta Bowie (re-named Greta Keene in this adaptation), to avoid further humiliation from her, as Keene had earlier dumped a bag of trash on Beverly and "slut-shamed" her. Beverly attempts to hide the products from the boys to save her from embarrassment, and later attempts to hide them from her abusive father, to no avail. After being asked by her father if she's "still his little girl", Beverly cuts her hair in her bathroom in an act of defiance. Beverly has to face more of the ideas of maturity than the other members of The Losers Club due to the abuse she faces at home, and the rumors of promiscuity that follow her at school. Beverly has to find her own way of maturing into womanhood, which has helped the character to stand out for many readers.

== See also ==
- Smurfette principle
