= It Chapter Two =

2019 film by Andy Muschietti

- Theatrical release poster
- Directed by: Andy Muschietti
- Screenplay by: Gary Dauberman
- Based on: It by Stephen King
- Produced by: Barbara Muschietti; Dan Lin; Roy Lee
- Starring: James McAvoy; Jessica Chastain; Bill Hader; James Ransone; Jay Ryan; Isaiah Mustafa; Andy Bean; Bill Skarsgård
- Cinematography: Checco Varese
- Edited by: Jason Ballantine
- Music by: Benjamin Wallfisch
- Production companies: New Line Cinema; Double Dream; Vertigo Entertainment; Rideback
- Distributed by: Warner Bros. Pictures
- Release dates: August 26, 2019 (Regency Village Theatre); September 6, 2019 (United States)
- Running time: 169 minutes
- Country: United States
- Language: English
- Budget: $79 million
- Box office: $473.1 million

It Chapter Two is a 2019 American supernatural horror film directed by Andy Muschietti from a screenplay by Gary Dauberman. It is the sequel to It (2017) and the second of a two-part adaptation of the 1986 novel It by Stephen King. The film stars James McAvoy, Jessica Chastain, Bill Hader, Isaiah Mustafa, Jay Ryan, James Ransone, Andy Bean, and Bill Skarsgård as Pennywise the Dancing Clown. Set 27 years after the events of the first film, the story centers on the Losers Club and their relationships as they reunite to destroy It once and for all.

Talks for an It sequel began in February 2016. By September 2017, New Line Cinema announced that the film would be released in September 2019, with Dauberman writing the script and Muschietti to direct. On a $79 million budget, filming took place from June to November 2018 at Pinewood Toronto Studios, Oshawa, Toronto, and Port Hope.

It Chapter Two premiered at the Regency Village Theatre in Los Angeles on August 26, 2019, and was released in the United States on September 6. The film received mixed reviews from critics with praise for its performances (particularly Skarsgård and Hader) but criticism for its runtime with many deeming it inferior to the first film. The film grossed $473.1 million worldwide. A prequel television series, titled It: Welcome to Derry, premiered on HBO on October 26, 2025, with Skarsgård reprising his role as Pennywise.

== Plot ==
In 2016, twenty-seven years after It's initial defeat, (Note: As depicted in It (2017).) Pennywise the Dancing Clown revives in Derry, Maine, killing a man named Adrian Mellon after he and his boyfriend are brutally assaulted by a group of homophobic teenagers.

Mike Hanlon, only black member of the Losers Club and the only one who remained in Derry, summons the other members, Bill Denbrough, Ben Hanscom, Beverly Marsh, Richie Tozier, Eddie Kaspbrak, and Stanley Uris. All of them return to Derry, except for Stanley, who kills himself. Mike refreshes the Losers' memories before It itself reveals the news of Stanley's suicide to them. Richie and Eddie decide to leave, until Beverly reveals that she has had visions of their deaths should they fail to fulfill their oath to kill It. Meanwhile, It kills a little girl named Victoria at a baseball game and helps Henry Bowers, who was arrested for the murder of his father, escape from a mental institution.

At the library, Mike shows Bill, via a drug-induced vision, that the Native American "Ritual of Chüd" can defeat It using artifacts from the Losers' past; Bill recovers Georgie's paper sailboat and meets a young boy, Dean, whom he warns to leave Derry. Beverly retrieves Ben's love poem from her childhood home before being attacked by It in the form of a demonic Ingrid Kersh. (Note: As revealed in It - Welcome to Derry (2025).) Richie goes to an abandoned cinema where he collects a game token and encounters Pennywise, who confronts him on his hidden homosexuality. Ben returns to the town's high school, choosing to use an old yearbook page signed by Beverly as his artifact, while Eddie recovers an inhaler from a pharmacy and is attacked by the Leper.

Returning to the hotel, Richie abandons the group, while Bill leaves for the town carnival and fails to save Dean from Pennywise. Bowers viciously attacks Eddie at the hotel before driving to the library. There, Bowers attacks Mike before Richie returns and impales Bowers, killing him. The Losers then travel to the Neibolt house where they convince Bill, distraught over his failure to save Dean, not to face It alone.

With their memories now fully restored, the group descends into a cavern beneath the sewers. Mike provides a rock from the Losers' fight with the Bowers Gang, and they perform the ritual using the artifacts in the remains of the meteor that brought It to Earth. The ritual fails as It emerges as an enormous Pennywise-spider hybrid and pressures Mike into revealing that the ritual killed the original native performers. It attacks the Losers and places Bill, Ben, and Beverly in individual hallucinations. They escape once Bill releases his guilt over being indirectly responsible for Georgie's death and Beverly realizes again that Ben was the one who wrote the love letter to her. When Richie is made catatonic by It, Eddie saves him but is fatally impaled. A weakened Eddie then explains how he made It feel small earlier, by choking the Leper nearly to death.

The Losers confront It about how they have overcome their fears, and proceed to psychologically antagonise and belittle It. Pennywise gradually becomes smaller and smaller with each insult, cycling through its many forms before eventually mutating into a crying, baby-like Pennywise. Mike pulls out It's heart, which he and the Losers crush with their bare hands. Pennywise laughs at its defeat, and dies.

They return to Eddie to find he has died from his injuries, and are forced to leave his body behind as It's cavern implodes, destroying the Neibolt House. At the water-logged quarry, the Losers comfort Richie, and Ben and Beverly kiss. Later, the scars on the Losers' hands disappear. After the Losers part ways, Ben and Beverly get married, Richie returns to the kissing bridge where he had once carved his and Eddie's initials, Mike moves out of Derry, and Bill begins writing his new story. Mike reveals to Bill that Stanley had written the Losers letters prior to his suicide; Stanley was too scared to face It, and his suicide was intended to strengthen his friends against It. He ends his letter with the words "We're Losers, and always will be".

== Cast ==
- Jessica Chastain as Beverly Marsh, the only female member of the Losers Club, who was abused by her father and bullied at school over false rumors of promiscuity. Adult Beverly is a successful fashion designer in New York City along with her abusive husband Tom Rogan.
  - Sophia Lillis as young Beverly Marsh
- James McAvoy as Bill Denbrough, the determined former leader of the Losers Club who hunted down and defeated It in the summer of 1989 after his younger brother Georgie is killed. As an adult, Bill is a successful mystery novelist in Los Angeles whose works are often criticized for having disappointing endings.
  - Jaeden Martell as young Bill Denbrough
- Bill Hader as Richie Tozier, Bill's bespectacled best friend and fellow member of the Losers Club, whose loud mouth and foul language often get him into trouble. As an adult, Richie is a successful stand-up comic in Chicago.
  - Finn Wolfhard as young Richie Tozier
- Isaiah Mustafa as Mike Hanlon, the sole member of the Losers Club who still lives in Derry, where he is the town librarian. As the only person who remembers everything that happened during the summer of 1989, he summons the other Losers back to Derry when It resurfaces.
  - Chosen Jacobs as young Mike Hanlon
  - Tristian Levi Cox and Torian Matthew Cox as 4-year-old Mike Hanlon
- Jay Ryan as Ben Hanscom, a member of the Losers Club. As a child, he was bullied for being overweight and he had a crush on Beverly. As an adult, he is a physically fit architect living in upstate New York, where he runs his company, Hanscom Architecture.
  - Jeremy Ray Taylor as young Ben Hanscom
- James Ransone as Eddie Kaspbrak, the youngest member of the Losers Club, a hypochondriac, and a victim of Munchausen syndrome by proxy. As an adult, Eddie is a successful risk analyst for an insurance firm in New York City and is married to Myra, who is very similar to his over-protective mother Sonia.
  - Jack Dylan Grazer as young Eddie Kaspbrak
- Andy Bean as Stanley Uris, a timid and pragmatic member of the Losers Club who aided in the battle against It in 1989, but fears It more than the others do. As an adult, he becomes a founding partner of a large accounting firm in Atlanta and is married to Patty Blum.
  - Wyatt Oleff as young Stanley Uris
- Bill Skarsgård as Pennywise the Dancing Clown, an ancient predatory creature from another dimension which was brought to Earth millions of years ago by a meteorite. It awakens every 27 years to feed on the fear of children that it kills. Pennywise is It's favorite and primary guise, although It can take many forms in order to instill fear into its victims. It was overpowered and seriously wounded by the Losers Club in 1989.

Other guises of It include Joan Gregson as Mrs. Kersh, an apparently sweet and gentle elderly woman (actually a monster) who lives in Beverly's childhood home; Javier Botet as Hobo, a leper who encountered Eddie at the 29 Neibolt Street house, and also as The Witch, the monstrous form of Mrs. Kersh; Jackson Robert Scott as Georgie Denbrough, Bill's late younger brother; and Owen Teague as Patrick Hockstetter, a young hoodlum who was eaten by Pennywise in the sewers in 1989. It also briefly appears without clown makeup, under the alias Bob Gray (also Skarsgård).

Additionally, Teach Grant portrays Henry Bowers, who terrorized the Losers Club in the summer of 1989 before he was incarcerated for killing his father while under It's influence. Nicholas Hamilton reprises his role as the young Henry Bowers. Molly Atkinson reprises her role as Sonia, Eddie's Munchausen syndrome by proxy-stricken mother, and also plays Eddie's wife Myra. Xavier Dolan and Taylor Frey appear as Adrian Mellon and Don Hagarty, a gay couple who are attacked by a group of youths during a carnival before Adrian is killed by It, while Jake Weary appears as Webby, the leader of the youth gang who attacks Adrian and Don. Luke Roessler portrays Dean, a young boy who meets Bill near the storm drain where Georgie was killed in 1988, and who is later killed by It at the Funland. Ryan Kiera Armstrong appears as Victoria Fuller, a girl who is killed by It after he lures her to under the bleachers at a baseball game. Jess Weixler portrays Bill's wife Audra Denbrough (née Phillips), Will Beinbrink portrays Beverly's abusive husband Tom Rogan, and Martha Girvin appears as Stanley's wife Patty. Stephen Bogaert, Jake Sim, Logan Thompson, Joe Bostick and Megan Charpentier reprise their roles from the first film as Beverly's abusive father Alvin Marsh, Henry's friends Reginald "Belch" Huggins and Victor "Vic" Criss, pharmacist Mr. Keene, and Keene's daughter Greta, respectively. Juno Rinaldi portrays the adult Greta. Katie Lunman reprises her role as Betty Ripsom in a vocal capacity, in addition to portraying a second character, Chris Unwin, one of Webby's friends who participates in assaulting Adrian and Don. Janet Porter plays Richie's mother, Marge Tozier, in a flashback.

Stephen King cameos as a pawn shop owner, the film's director Andy Muschietti cameos as a customer at the pharmacy, and filmmaker Peter Bogdanovich cameos as himself, the director of the film based on Bill's novel. Brandon Crane (who played young Ben Hanscom in the 1990 two-episode television miniseries adaptation of It) also makes a cameo appearance as a board member of Hanscom Architecture.

== Production ==
=== Development ===
In February 2016, producer Roy Lee, in an interview with Collider, mentioned a second It film, remarking, "[Dauberman] wrote the most recent draft working with [Muschietti], so it's being envisioned as two movies."

In July 2017, Muschietti revealed that production was set to begin in the spring of 2018, adding, "We'll probably have a script for the second part in January [2018]. Ideally, we would start prep in March. Part one is only about the kids. Part two is about these characters 27 years later as adults, with flashbacks to 1989 when they were kids." Muschietti spoke of looking forward to having a dialogue in the second film that does not exist within the first, stating, "... it seems like we're going to do it. It's the second half, it's not a sequel. It's the second half and it's very connected to the first one." Muschietti stated that two cut scenes from the first film will possibly be included in the second, one of which being the fire at the Black Spot from the book.

In September 2017, New Line Cinema announced that the sequel would be released on September 6, 2019, with Gary Dauberman writing the script and Andy Muschietti returning to direct. Dauberman would later leave the project to write and direct Annabelle Comes Home, while Jason Fuchs was brought in as his replacement.

=== Casting ===
In an interview in July 2017, the child actors from the first film were asked which actors they would choose to play them in the sequel. Sophia Lillis chose Jessica Chastain and Finn Wolfhard chose Bill Hader, both of whom would end up cast in those roles.

In September 2017, Muschietti and his sister mentioned that Chastain would be their top choice to play the adult version of Beverly Marsh. In November 2017, Chastain herself expressed interest in the project. Finally, in February 2018, Chastain officially joined the cast, reuniting her with Muschietti, who directed her in Mama. By April 2018, Hader and James McAvoy were in talks to join the cast to play adult versions of Richie Tozier and Bill Denbrough, respectively. In May 2018, James Ransone, Jay Ryan and Andy Bean joined the cast to portray adult versions of Eddie Kaspbrak, Ben Hanscom, and Stanley Uris, respectively.

In June 2018, Isaiah Mustafa joined as the adult version of Mike Hanlon, while Xavier Dolan and Will Beinbrink were also cast as Adrian Mellon and Tom Rogan, respectively. Later, Teach Grant was cast to play the adult version of Henry Bowers, played by Nicholas Hamilton, and Jess Weixler was also cast, as Bill's wife. This is the second collaboration between McAvoy, Chastain, Hader, Weixler and Beinbrink after The Disappearance of Eleanor Rigby. In September 2018, it was revealed that Javier Botet would appear in the film. He played It in its Hobo and Witch forms.

Filmmaker Guillermo del Toro was sought for a cameo as the janitor that Ben encounters when fleeing from Pennywise. Despite nearly securing del Toro, he was not included in the final film. Stephen King's son and fellow author Joe Hill was originally envisioned to cameo as the younger version of the pawn shop owner in a flashback scene with young Bill and Beverly, but the scene was cut from the final draft of the screenplay. Maturin the Turtle was reported to be in the film. This did not happen, although a golden turtle statue can be seen in Ben's home and a smaller one can be seen in a classroom scene.

=== Filming ===
Principal photography on the film began on June 19, 2018, at Pinewood Toronto Studios. The sewer system set was constructed at Pinewood, while the actual grate is located in North York. Much of the location work was done in and around Port Hope during summer 2018, as the town stood in for the fictional Maine town of Derry; signs and decor were changed as necessary. The Town Hall exterior was used as the Derry Library. Some exterior shots of the hotel were filmed at the town's Hotel Carlyle.

Some interiors were filmed at a 1902 mansion in Toronto, Cranfield House, while homes in the city, and in Oshawa and Pickering, were used as exteriors. An old mansion set was built for exteriors of the Pennywise home, and later burned, in Oshawa. The synagogue in the film was actually the Congregation Knesseth Israel in Toronto. Derry High School exteriors were filmed at the Mount Mary Retreat Centre in Ancaster, Ontario. Other locations used by the production included the Elora Quarry Conservation Area, the Scottish Rite in Hamilton, Ontario, Audley Park in Ajax, Ontario, Rouge Park in Scarborough, Toronto (as The Barrens) and The Mandarin Restaurant in Mississauga.

Filming concluded in early November 2018 after 86 days of production.

=== Post-production ===
The visual effects were provided by Atomic Arts and Method Studios. They were supervised by Brooke Lyndon-Stanford, Justin Cornish, and Josh Simmonds, as well as Nicholas Brooks as the Production Supervisor, with help from Cubica, Lola VFX, Make VFX, Rodeo FX and Soho VFX. The teenage actors were digitally de-aged to match their respective ages during filming of the first film.

== Music ==
On March 29, 2019, it was announced that English composer, conductor, and pianist Benjamin Wallfisch, who had previously composed original scores for films such as Hidden Figures, Blade Runner 2049 and Shazam!, was set to compose the soundtrack for It Chapter Two, marking this as the second time the composer has worked with director Andy Muschietti, after previously composing the soundtrack for the first It theatrical film in 2017. The soundtrack features 45 original tracks that were released on August 30, 2019.

According to Wallfisch, the score for It Chapter Two features a larger orchestra and choir than previously and draws on both themes from the first film's soundtrack with "more scale and ambition — to reflect the scope of the film", as well as creates new themes to reflect the characters development over the past 27 years.

== Marketing ==
The first concept art of the adult versions of the Losers' Club was released on July 2, 2018, as principal photography began. The first teaser poster of the film was released on October 31, 2018. A first look from the film was shown at the CinemaCon on April 2, 2019. A second teaser poster was released on May 9, 2019, along with a teaser trailer. On July 17, 2019, the second poster and the theatrical trailer were released at San Diego Comic-Con. The studio spent a total of $95 million promoting the film worldwide.

== Release ==
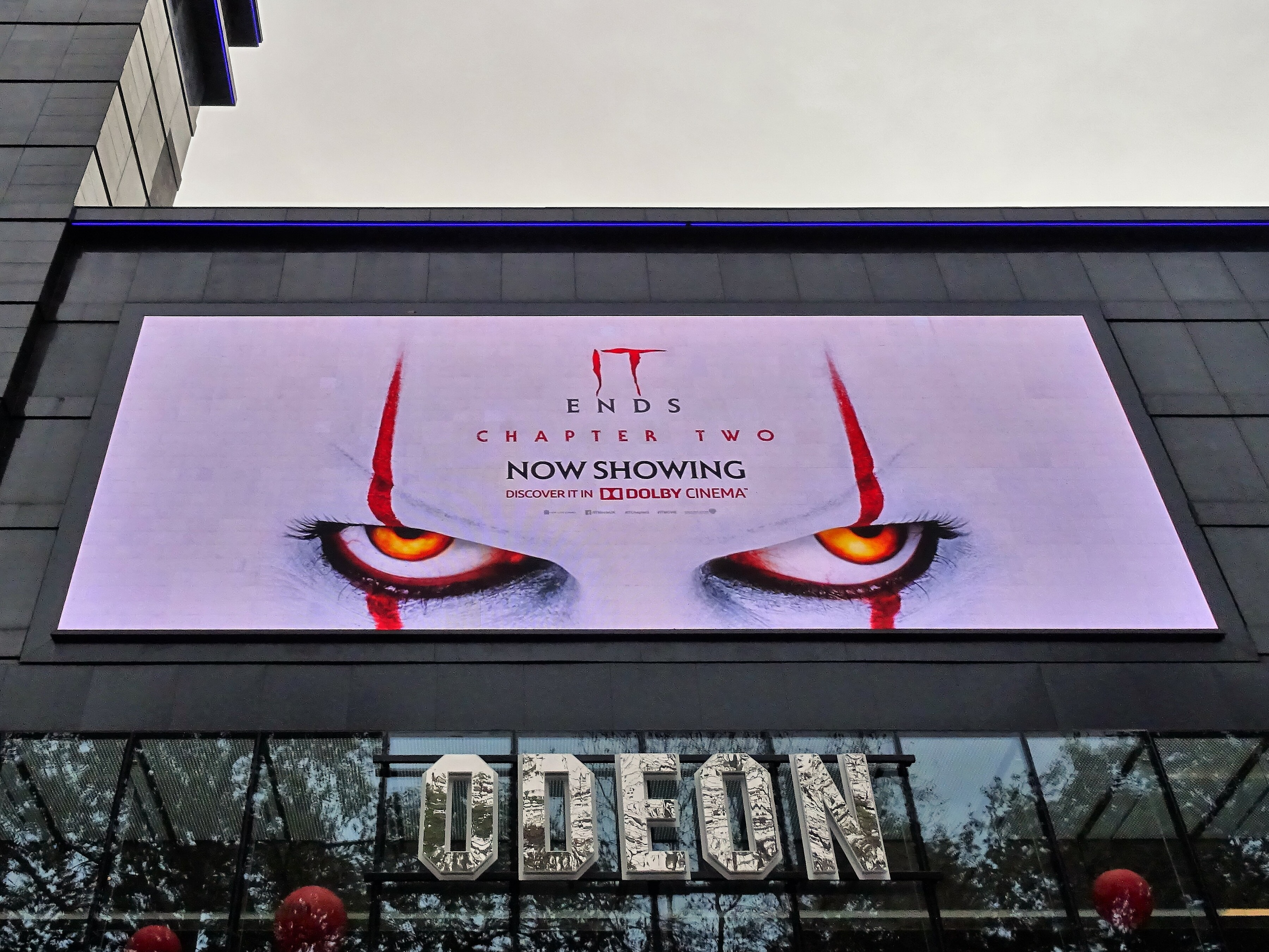
It Chapter Two advertisement at the Odeon Luxe Leicester Square in London

=== Theatrical ===
It Chapter Two had its world premiere at the Regency Village Theater in Los Angeles, California on August 26, 2019, and was theatrically released in the United States on September 6, 2019, by Warner Bros. Pictures.

=== Home media ===
The film was released in a digital format on November 19, 2019. A release on DVD, Blu-ray, and 4K occurred on December 10, 2019, in the United States.

== Reception ==
=== Box office ===
It Chapter Two grossed $211.6 million in the United States and Canada, and $261.5 million in other territories, for a worldwide total of $473.1 million. Deadline Hollywood calculated the net profit of the film to be $169 million, when factoring together all expenses and revenues.

In the United States and Canada, the film was projected to gross $90–100 million from 4,570 theaters in its opening weekend, and the week of its release broke Fandango's record for most advance tickets sold by a horror film. The film made $37.4 million in its first day, including $10.5 million from Thursday night previews, the second-highest total for both a September opening and horror film, behind the first film's $13.5 million. It went on to debut to $91 million, also the second-best ever for a horror film and a September release, while being over $30 million less than the first film.

The lower debut was attributed to a more mixed critical reception, as well as the nearly three-hour runtime, which some exhibitors said possibly curbed business. The film also had the fifth-highest opening weekend for an R-rated film, behind its predecessor It, The Matrix Reloaded, Deadpool and Deadpool 2. It made $39.6 million in its second weekend, retaining the top spot, before making $17.0 million in its third weekend and being dethroned by newcomer Downton Abbey.

=== Critical response ===
Metacritic review
breakdown (unweighted)

Positive
24 (46%)
Mixed
25 (48%)
Negative
3 (6%)

On the review aggregator website Rotten Tomatoes, 62% of 382 critics' reviews are positive, with an average rating of 6.1/10. The website's consensus reads: "It Chapter Two proves bigger doesn't always mean scarier for horror sequels, but a fine cast and faithful approach to the source material keep this follow-up afloat." Metacritic, which uses a weighted average, assigned the film a score of 58 out of 100, based on 52 critics, indicating "mixed or average" reviews. Audiences polled by CinemaScore gave the film an average grade of "B+" on an A+ to F scale, the same as the first film, while those at PostTrak gave it an overall positive score of 76% and a 56% "definite recommend".

Writing for the Chicago Sun-Times, Richard Roeper praised the production design and cast, but said the film was not as scary as the first, specifying, "For all of Muschietti's visual flourishes and with the greatly talented Bill Skarsgård again delivering a madcap, disturbingly effective, all-in performance as the dreaded Pennywise, It Chapter Two had a relatively muted impact on me." Variety's Peter Debruge wrote, "The clown is back, and the kids have grown up in part two of Stephen King's monster novel, which inspires an overlong, but suitably scary sequel," while Christy Lemire of RogerEbert.com gave the film two-and-a-half out of four stars, stating that "It Chapter Two can be a sprawling, unwieldy mess—overlong, overstuffed and full of frustrating detours—but its casting is so spot-on, its actors have such great chemistry and its monster effects are so deliriously ghoulish that the film keeps you hooked."

Katie Rife of The A.V. Club gave the film a grade of "C+," praising Hader's performance but summarizing, "What a shame, then to build this beautiful stage, populate it with talented actors and high-level craftspeople, and then drop them all through the trap door of plodding humor and scattershot plotting." Aja Romano of Vox called the film "well-made and entertaining", but criticized what she termed the "lack of chemistry" between members of the adult cast, and wrote that the film "muddles [the] message" of the novel on which it is based. Rich Juzwiak of Jezebel gave the film a negative review, calling it "meandering" and "a movie that has no sense of its rules".

The film also received criticism over Stan's suicide, as the film showed the suicide as a sacrifice intended to strengthen his friends and remove him as the weak link, whereas in the book he died by suicide purely out of terror. Critics from outlets such as Screen Rant and SyFy felt that it sent out a bad message to the audience, with William Bibbiani of Bloody Disgusting noting that it "potentially conveys a message to the audience that killing yourself could be a rational response to dealing with childhood trauma." Jessica Lachenal of Bustle criticized the film as running the risk of glorifying Stan's suicide as a "noble sacrifice", stating that it sends a dangerous message to those struggling with mental health issues.

=== Accolades ===
Award	Category	Nominee	Result	Ref.
Casting Society of America	The Zeitgeist Award	Rich Delia, Stephanie Gorin, Coco Kleppinger	Nominated	
Hollywood Music In Media Awards	Best Original Score - Horror Film	Benjamin Wallfisch	Nominated	
Make-Up Artists and Hair Stylists Guild	Best Special Makeup Effects – Feature-Length Motion Picture	Sean Sansom, Shane Zander, Iantha Goldberg	Nominated	
Saturn Awards	Best Horror Film Release	It Chapter Two	Nominated	
Saturn Awards	Best Supporting Actor	Bill Hader	Won	
Saturn Awards	Best Make-up	Shane Zander, Alec Gillis, Tom Woodruff Jr.	Nominated	
Saturn Awards	Best Special Effects	Kristy Hollidge, Nicholas Brooks	Nominated	
World Soundtrack Awards	Film Composer of the Year	Benjamin Wallfisch (also for The Invisible Man)	Nominated	

== Future ==
=== Potential third film ===
In September 2019, Skarsgård spoke of the possibility of a third installment, saying, "It would have to be the right type of approach to it. The book ends where the second movie ends, so that is the final chapter of this story. There is this interesting aspect of going back in time before all this happened. There might be a story there that might be worth exploring. Obviously that would be a story that's not in the book, it would be a freestanding story, but obviously within the same universe. So, there might be something interesting out of it. I think it would be fun."

Two months later, Dauberman discussed in an interview of the possibility of a third film, saying, "I do think it's possible. Anything in the Stephen King Universe interests me, but there's only so much of the story we could tell in the two movies. There are definitely elements of the novel you could expand on and make its own movie. It's just a question of whether or not people want to see it. I do think It was on this planet for a very, very, very long time and that's a lot of bloodshed and a lot of stories to tell and I think you could do that for sure."

=== Prequel series ===
In March 2022, Variety reported that the Muschiettis and Jason Fuchs are in development of and executive producing a prequel series for Max titled It: Welcome to Derry that would take place in the 1960s before the events of It Chapter One and include the origin story of Pennywise the Clown. Andy Muschietti directed four of the eight episodes. Stephen King stated that he would not be involved in the development of the series, but was looking forward to seeing it. Principal photography was scheduled to begin in early April 2023 in Toronto, Canada.

In March 2023, Bill Skarsgård stated that he was not currently involved in the prequel series, although in May 2024, he was confirmed as returning as Pennywise/It, as well as being executive producer on the series. In April 2023, Max announced that Taylour Paige, Jovan Adepo, James Remar, and Chris Chalk were cast in undisclosed roles. The series released on HBO after the series was moved from Max. The series premiered on October 26, 2025.
