= Tony Dakota =

American actor (born 1982)

- Born: Antonio Tomasi Depiano; 1982 (age 43–44); Auburn, Washington, United States

Tony Dakota (born 1982) is an American actor known for his roles as Clavo on the television series 21 Jump Street and Georgie Denbrough in the 1990 television mini-series version of Stephen King's epic horror novel It. He also had voice roles in the animated television series Captain N: The Game Master, and had minor roles in television series such as MacGyver. In 2019, Tony reprised his role as Georgie Denbrough in the short fan film, titled Georgie, based on the It television mini-series.

== Filmography ==
=== Film ===
Year	Title	Role	Notes
1989	Who's Harry Crumb?	Freddy	
1989	Immediate Family	Kid on Blanket	
1993	The Lotus Easter	Goeffey	
2019	Georgie	Georgie Denbrough	Short fan film based on the It television mini-series
2021	Pennywise: The Story of It	Himself	Documentary film

=== Television ===
Year	Title	Role	Notes
1989	Unsub	Aaron	Episode: And They Swam Right Over the Dam
1989	Little Golden Book Land	Baby Brown Bear (voice)	TV movie
1989	Wiseguy	Al Merullo Jr.	Episode: Le Lacrime D'Amore: Part 1
1989	Captain N: The Game Master	Additional Voices	13 episodes
1989–1991	MacGyver	Boy/Tommy Giordano	2 episodes
1990	It	Georgie Denbrough	Television mini-series
1990	21 Jump Street	Clavo	8 episodes
1990	Mom P.I.	Kid	Episode: Blue Christmas
1992	The Heights	Max	Episode: On the Nickel
