= It (novel) =

1986 novel by Stephen King

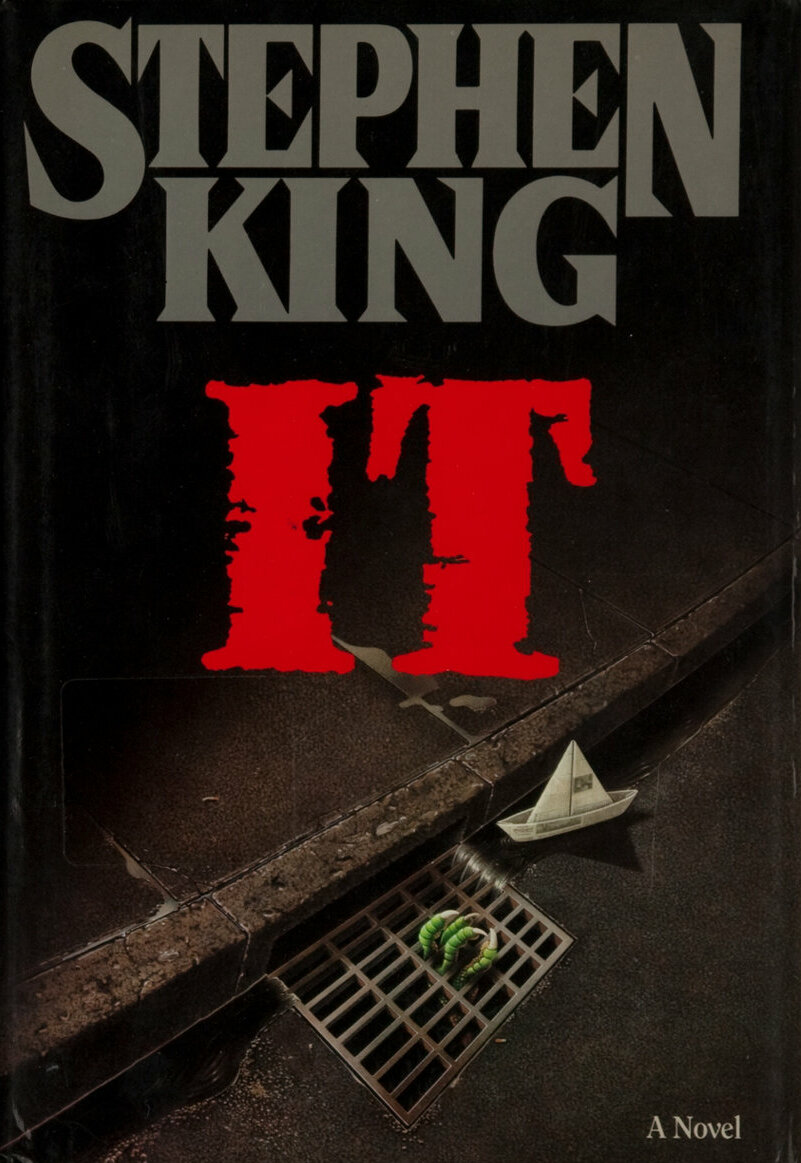
- First edition cover
- Author: Stephen King
- Cover artist: Bob Giusti (illustration); Amy Hill (lettering)
- Language: English
- Genre: Horror; Thriller; Dark fantasy Coming-of-age story
- Publisher: Viking
- Publication date: September 15, 1986
- Publication place: United States
- Media type: Print
- Pages: 1,138
- ISBN: 0-670-81302-8
- OCLC: 936070975

It is a 1986 horror novel by American author Stephen King. This is his 22^{nd} book and his 17^{th} novel written under his own name. The story follows seven children as they are terrorized by an evil entity called It, which exploits the fears of its victims to disguise itself while hunting its prey. It is a monstrous, shapeshifting predator that primarily appears in the form of Pennywise the Dancing Clown to attract its preferred prey of young children.

The story is told through a nonlinear narrative, alternating between two time periods. It chronicles "the Losers' Club", a group of seven outcast children in the fictional town of Derry, Maine, during the late 1950s. The Losers discover they are being haunted by an ancient, trans-dimensional evil that awakens every 27 years to feed on the town's children. After a battle with the creature, they make a blood oath to return to Derry if It ever resurfaces. Twenty-seven years later, the killings resume, and the now-adult Losers, who have largely forgotten the traumatic events of their childhood, must return to their hometown to confront the monster one last time.

The book explores themes of memory, childhood trauma, the loss of innocence, and the power of unity and belief. Upon release, It became the best-selling hardcover fiction book in the United States for 1986 and won the British Fantasy Award in 1987. The novel was largely acclaimed for its epic scope, and critical discussion surrounded its length, graphic violence, and a sexually explicit scene involving the child protagonists. The character of Pennywise has become one of the most iconic villains in popular culture, and the novel's success has led to multiple adaptations, including the 1990 television miniseries It, a two-part film adaptation, It (2017) and It Chapter Two (2019), and the 2025 television series It: Welcome to Derry.

== Background ==
In 1978, King and his family lived in Boulder, Colorado. One evening, King ventured alone to pick up his car from the repair shop and came across an old wooden bridge, "humped and oddly quaint". Walking along the bridge caused King to recall the story of "Three Billy Goats Gruff", and the idea of transplanting the tale's scenario into a real-life context interested him. King was further inspired by a line by Marianne Moore—“imaginary gardens with real toads in them"—which in his mind came out as "real trolls in imaginary gardens". King returned to the concept two years later and gradually accumulated ideas and thoughts, particularly the concept of weaving the narratives of children and the adults they become. King began writing It in 1980, and finished the book five years later. King found influence in the mythology and history surrounding the construction of the sewer system in Bangor, Maine.

== Plot ==
The novel is told through narratives alternating between two time periods, and largely in the third-person omniscient mode.

=== 1957–1958 ===
During a rainstorm in Derry, Maine, a six-year-old boy named Georgie Denbrough sails a paper boat along the rainy streets before it washes down into a storm drain. Looking in the drain, Georgie encounters a clown who introduces himself as Pennywise the Dancing Clown. Georgie, despite knowing he should not talk to strangers, is enticed by Pennywise to reach into the drain and retrieve his boat. It then rips his arm off, and Georgie dies.

The following June, an overweight eleven-year-old boy named Ben Hanscom is harassed by a bully named Henry Bowers and his gang on the last day of school, escaping into the marshy wasteland known as the Barrens. There, Ben befriends an asthmatic hypochondriac named Eddie Kaspbrak and William "Stuttering Bill" Denbrough, Georgie's elder brother. The three boys later befriend fellow misfits Richie Tozier, Stan Uris, and Beverly Marsh, and refer to themselves as "The Losers Club". As the summer draws on, the Losers each encounter Pennywise in terrifying manifestations: a mummy on a frozen canal to Ben, a fountain of blood (that only children can see) from Beverly's sink, a rotting leper to Eddie, drowned corpses to Stan, and a frightening phantom of Georgie to Bill. Meanwhile, the increasingly unhinged and sadistic Bowers begins focusing his attention on his African-American neighbor, Mike Hanlon and his father. Bowers kills Mike's dog and chases the terrified boy into the Barrens, where he joins the Losers in driving Bowers's gang off in a rock fight, leaving a humiliated Bowers promising revenge. Mike becomes a member of the Losers Club after revealing his own encounter with Pennywise in the form of a carnivorous bird.

From Mike's historical scrapbook, the Losers realize that It is an ancient monster with a firm grip on the town. Following further encounters, the Losers construct a makeshift smoke hole that Richie and Mike use to hallucinate It's origins as an ancient extraterrestrial who came to Earth, beginning a cycle of hunting for one year followed by a 27-year-long hibernation.

Eddie is hospitalized by Bowers and several of his friends, and Beverly witnesses one of the bullies, Patrick Hockstetter, consumed by It in the form of a mass of flying leeches. The Losers discover a message from It written in Patrick's blood, warning them that It will kill them if they interfere. In the hope that silver can wound It, Ben makes two silver slugs out of a silver dollar, and the Losers enter an abandoned house where Eddie, Bill, and Richie had previously encountered It to attempt to kill It. They manage to wound It with the silver while It is in the form of a werewolf. Deeming the Losers a threat, It manipulates Bowers into murdering his abusive father, then chasing the Losers into the sewers to kill them, where his accompanying fellow bullies, Vic Criss and Reginald "Belch" Huggins, are both killed by It. Bowers is lost in the sewers.

In the sewers, Bill performs the Ritual of Chüd in an attempt to face It in the Macroverse, the alternate universe where It is from. There he meets the monster's antithesis, Maturin, an ancient turtle that created the universe. Bill learns that It can only be defeated during a battle of wills, in which he emerges victorious; in doing so, he sees Its true form, and its place of origin, the Deadlights. After the battle, not knowing if they killed It or not, the Losers get lost in the sewers. To try and regain a sense of direction, Beverly has sexual intercourse with each of the boys. Once they are safely out, the Losers swear a blood oath to return to Derry should the threat resurface. Bowers, having lost his sanity by the time he escaped the sewers into a nearby river, is institutionalized after being blamed for the town's child murders.

=== 1984–1985 ===
In July 1984, three youths brutally attack a young gay man named Adrian Mellon and throw him off a bridge, where Adrian's partner and one of the attackers both see a mysterious clown. Adrian is found dead and mutilated, and the teens are arrested and charged with his murder.

When a string of violent child killings begins in Derry again, Mike Hanlon, who is now the town's librarian, calls up the six former members of the Losers Club to remind them of their childhood promise to return if the killings start again. Bill is now a successful horror writer living with his actress wife, Audra; Beverly is a fashion designer, married to an abusive man named Tom Rogan; Eddie runs a limousine rental company and has married a codependent woman similar to his hypochondriac mother; Richie Tozier is a disc jockey; Ben Hanscom has lost weight and is a successful, but single and lonely architect; and Stan Uris is a wealthy accountant. Prior to Mike's phone calls, all of the Losers had completely forgotten each other and the trauma of their childhood, burying the horror of their encounters with It. All of the Losers agree to return to Derry, except for Stan, who kills himself in terror of facing It again.

The Losers meet for lunch, where Mike reminds them that the creature awakens roughly every 27 years for 12–16 months at a time, feeding on children before going into slumber again. The group decides to kill It once and for all. At Mike's suggestion, each person explores different parts of Derry to help restore their memories. While exploring, Eddie, Richie, Beverly, and Ben are faced with manifestations of It (Eddie as Belch Huggins and childhood friends in leprous and zombified forms, Richie as a Paul Bunyan statue, Beverly as the witch from Hansel & Gretel in her childhood home, and Ben as Dracula in the Derry Library). Bill finds his childhood bicycle, "Silver", and brings it to Mike's. In the meantime, Audra, who is worried about Bill, travels to Derry; Beverly's husband arrives as well, intending to kill Beverly, who has finally vanquished his power over her; and Henry Bowers escapes from the mental asylum with help from It.

Henry confronts Mike at the library, but Mike escapes, seriously injured. It instructs Henry to kill the rest of the Losers, but Henry is killed while attacking Eddie. It then appears to Tom and orders him to capture Audra, bringing Audra to Its lair, where Audra becomes catatonic, and Tom, seeing It in its true form, collapses with shock. Bill, Ben, Beverly, Richie, and Eddie learn that Mike is near death and realize they are being forced into another confrontation with It. They descend into the sewers and use their strength as a group to "send energy" to a hospitalized Mike, who fights off a nurse who is under the control of It.

They reach It's lair, and the clown transforms into its true form: a giant, mutated spider-like creature. Bill and Richie enter Its mind through the Ritual of Chüd, but they get lost in It. Eddie injures It by spraying his asthma medication down It's throat, using the monster's powers of imagination to believe he is spraying acid in It's mouth, which works. It bites off Eddie's arm, killing him. It runs away to tend to its injuries, but Bill, Richie, and Ben chase after and find that It has laid eggs. Ben stays behind to destroy the eggs, while Bill and Richie head toward their final confrontation with It. Bill surprises and attacks It, before managing to wound It's heart. The Spider attempts to bargain with the group, but the Losers collectively beat, stomp and dismember the creature, killing It.

The group meets up to head out of It's lair, and although they try to bring Audra and Eddie's bodies with them, they are forced to leave Eddie behind. They realize that the scars on their hands from their blood pact have disappeared, indicating that their ordeal is finally over.

At the same time, the worst storm in Maine's history sweeps through Derry, and the downtown area collapses. Mike concludes that Derry is dying. The Losers return home and gradually begin to forget about It, Derry, and each other all over again. Mike's memory of the events of that summer also begins to fade, as well as any of the records he had written down previously, much to his relief, and he considers starting a new life elsewhere. Ben and Beverly leave together and become a couple, and Richie returns to California. Bill is the last to leave Derry. Before he goes, he takes Audra, still catatonic, for a ride on Silver, which awakens her from her catatonia, and they share a kiss.

== Themes ==
It thematically focuses on the loss of childhood innocence and questions the difference between necessity and free will. Grady Hendrix described the book as being "about the fact that some doors only open one way, and that while there's an exit out of childhood named sex, there's no door leading the other way that turns adults back into children". The New York Times also interpreted the story as focusing on the United States, exemplified by its portrayal of 1950s popular culture's rock 'n' roll music and brand names; its titular antagonist is symbolized by the country's other issues it has endured historically, such as prejudice, economic hardship, environment pollution via industry, and crime. Analyzed The Guardian, the prepotent fears portrayed in the book come from the Losers Club's personal lives, especially their marginalized status, rather than Pennywise.

== Release ==
On December 13, 2011, Cemetery Dance published a special limited edition of It for the 25th anniversary of the novel (ISBN 978-1-58767-270-5) in three editions: an unsigned limited gift edition of 2,750, a signed limited edition of 750, and a signed and lettered limited edition of 52. All three editions are oversized hardcovers, housed in a slipcase or traycase, and feature premium binding materials. This anniversary edition features a new dust jacket illustration by Glen Orbik, as well as numerous interior illustrations by Alan M. Clark and Erin Wells. The book also contains a new afterword by Stephen King discussing his reasons for writing the novel.

== Reception and legacy ==
The novel won the British Fantasy Award in 1987, and received nominations for the Locus and World Fantasy Awards that year. Publishers Weekly listed It as the best-selling hardcover fiction book in the United States in 1986.

Contemporary reviews of the novel were more mixed, with critics divided on several issues, including the book's length, the way in which women characters are "demonized", and the controversial sex scene involving children.

The New York Times praised the author's ability to create atmosphere, but perceived a lack of motivation in Stanley Uris's death and the reunion of the group. Reactor described the book as "by turns boring and shocking" and "one of King's most frustrating and perplexing books", and criticized the portrayal of the child characters as "a little too perfect". The Guardian revisited the book after 30 years, describing the novel as "incredible: a structural marvel", and expressed concern over the descriptions of childhood sexuality, especially the scene "involving the young Losers' Club taking part in what amounts to an orgy", although Grady Hendrix in Reactor identified this moment as "in a sense, the heart of the book" and a thematic demonstration of the crossing from childhood to adulthood.

In 2003, It was listed at number 144 on the BBC's The Big Read poll, as one of three King novels on the list.

The character Pennywise has been named by several outlets as one of the scariest clowns in film or pop culture.

In 2025, the novel was banned in Russia.

== Adaptations ==
In 1990, the novel was adapted into a television miniseries starring Tim Curry as Pennywise the Clown/It, John Ritter as Ben Hanscom, Harry Anderson as Richie Tozier, Richard Masur as Stan Uris, Tim Reid as Mike Hanlon, Annette O'Toole as Beverly Marsh, Richard Thomas as Bill Denbrough, Olivia Hussey as Audra Phillips, Dennis Christopher as Eddie Kaspbrak, and Michael Cole as Henry Bowers. The younger versions of the characters were played by Brandon Crane (Ben), Seth Green (Richie), Ben Heller (Stan), Marlon Taylor (Mike), Emily Perkins (Beverly), Jonathan Brandis (Bill), Adam Faraizl (Eddie), and Jarred Blancard (Henry). The miniseries was directed by Tommy Lee Wallace and scripted by Wallace and Lawrence D. Cohen.

In 1998, the novel was adapted into a television series set in India, starring Lilliput as Pennywise the Clown/Vikram/Woh/It, and Ashutosh Gowarikar (Ashutosh), Mamik Singh (Rahul), Anupam Bhattacharya (Sanjeev), Shreyas Talpade (Young Ashutosh), Parzan Dastur (Young Siddhart), Manoj Joshi (Amit), and Daya Shankar Pandey (Chandu), the series' equivalent of the Losers Club. The series was directed and written by Glen Baretto and Ankush Mohla.

The first of a two-part feature film adaptation, It, was released on September 8, 2017. It is directed by Andy Muschietti, with a screenplay by Chase Palmer, Cary Fukunaga and Gary Dauberman. Instead of a dual narrative, the first film is solely an adaptation of the section that features the characters as children, though the setting has been updated to the late 1980s. It stars Bill Skarsgård as Pennywise and Jaeden Martell as Bill Denbrough. Supporting roles are played by Finn Wolfhard as Richie Tozier, Sophia Lillis as Beverly Marsh, Jack Dylan Grazer as Eddie Kaspbrak, Wyatt Oleff as Stanley Uris, Chosen Jacobs as Mike Hanlon, Jeremy Ray Taylor as Ben Hanscom, Owen Teague as Patrick Hockstetter, Nicholas Hamilton as Henry Bowers, Logan Thompson as Vic Criss and Jake Sim as Belch Huggins.

The second film, It Chapter Two, adapted the "adult" section and updated the setting to the 2010s, specifically 2016. It starred James McAvoy (Bill), Bill Hader (Richie), Jessica Chastain (Beverly), James Ransone (Eddie), Andy Bean (Stan), Isaiah Mustafa (Mike), and Jay Ryan (Ben). Skarsgård reprised the role of Pennywise and the younger actors returned as well. Principal photography wrapped in 2018, and it was released on September 6, 2019.

On March 21, 2022, Variety reported that Muschietti, along with his sister Barbara Muschietti, and Jason Fuchs, was developing and executive producing a prequel series for HBO Max, titled It: Welcome to Derry. The show takes place in 1962, before the events of It: Chapter One, and includes the origin story of Pennywise the Clown. The series premiered on October 26, 2025.
