= Sophia Lillis =

American actress (born 2002)

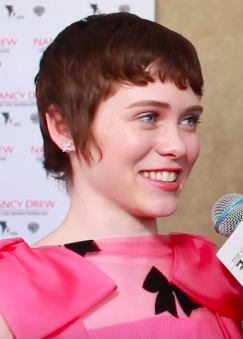
- Lillis at the premiere of Nancy Drew and the Hidden Staircase in 2019
- Born: February 13, 2002 (age 24); New York City, U.S.
- Occupation: Actress
- Years active: 2013–present

Sophia Lillis (born February 13, 2002) is an American actress. She gained prominence for her roles as Beverly Marsh in the horror films It (2017) and It: Chapter Two (2019) and as a teenager with telekinesis in the Netflix drama series I Am Not Okay with This (2020).

Lillis has also appeared in the HBO psychological thriller miniseries Sharp Objects (2018), the film Dungeons & Dragons: Honor Among Thieves (2023), and the HBO comedy thriller series The Chair Company (2025).

== Early life ==
Sophia Lillis was born on February 13, 2002, along with her fraternal twin brother, Jake. Lillis and her parents appeared in a 2012 episode of The Real Housewives of New York City in which Jake, a bilateral above-knee amputee, was presented with hybrid running legs by Aviva Drescher.

== Career ==
=== Early work ===
Lillis made her film debut starring in the 2016 film 37. Previously, she had a minor role in Julie Taymor's stage production of William Shakespeare's A Midsummer Night's Dream, which was also filmed for live showings. She is an alumna of the Lee Strasberg Theatre and Film Institute.

=== Breakthrough ===
In 2017, she rose to prominence after co-starring as one of the lead characters, Beverly Marsh, in the horror film It, an adaptation of Stephen King's novel of the same name. Directed by Andy Muschietti, It also starred Jaeden Martell, Finn Wolfhard, Wyatt Oleff, Bill Skarsgård, Jack Dylan Grazer, Jeremy Ray Taylor, and Chosen Jacobs. Later that year, she played one of Kristen Bell and Dax Shepard's children in Sia's music video "Santa's Coming for Us".

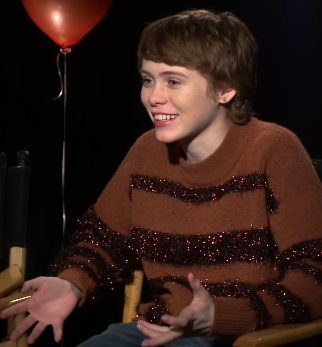
Lillis in 2018

In 2018, Lillis appeared in the HBO television miniseries Sharp Objects, in which she played a young Camille Preaker. In 2019, Lillis starred as teenage sleuth Nancy Drew in the Warner Bros. film adaptation of Nancy Drew and the Hidden Staircase. While the film received mixed to positive reviews, Lillis's performance was singled out for praise. She reprised her role as Beverly Marsh in It: Chapter Two in 2019.

In 2020, Lillis portrayed Gretel in Gretel & Hansel, a re-imagining of the German fairy tale "Hansel and Gretel". The following month, Lillis played the lead role in the Netflix original series I Am Not Okay with This. In November, she appeared with Paul Bettany in Uncle Frank, an independent film by True Blood and Six Feet Under creator Alan Ball, which premiered on Amazon Prime.

In October 2022, Lillis performed in Heroes of the Fourth Turning at Studio Theatre in Washington, D.C..

Lillis appeared in the 2023 film Dungeons & Dragons: Honor Among Thieves. She was cast as the younger sister of Michael Cera's character, Eric, in the Dustin Guy Defa film The Adults. Lillis is part of an ensemble cast, including Jeff Goldblum, Tom Hanks, Maya Hawke, and Scarlett Johansson, who appear in the 2023 Wes Anderson film Asteroid City.

In July 2024, she was cast in the Peacock television series All Her Fault. She starred alongside Dave Bautista in the 2025 action film Trap House.

=== Upcoming roles ===
At the Game Awards 2023, video game producer Hideo Kojima and filmmaker Jordan Peele presented the trailer for their upcoming horror game, OD, with Lillis starring in a leading role.

== Filmography ==
Key
†	Denotes projects that have not yet been released

=== Films ===
Year	Title	Role	Notes	Ref.
2016	37	Debbie Bernstein		
2017	It	Beverly "Bev" Marsh		
2019	Nancy Drew and the Hidden Staircase	Nancy Drew		
2019	It Chapter Two	Young Beverly "Bev" Marsh		
2020	Uncle Frank	Elizabeth "Beth" Bledsoe		
2020	Gretel & Hansel	Gretel		
2023	Dungeons & Dragons: Honor Among Thieves	Doric		
2023	The Adults	Maggie		
2023	Asteroid City	Shelly Borden		
2023	OD - TGA 2023 Teaser Trailer	not stated	Short film / video game trailer	
2025	Trap House	Deni Matthews-Albright		
TBA	Knight's Camp †	TBA	Pre-production	
TBA	Bobby Fox in the Lower Dimension †	TBA	Pre-production	
TBA	Ancient History †	TBA	Post-production	

=== Television ===
Year	Title	Role	Notes	Ref.
2012	The Real Housewives of New York City	Herself		
2018	Sharp Objects	Young Camille Preaker	Miniseries	
2020	I Am Not Okay with This	Sydney Novak	Main role	
2020	Acting for a Cause	Helen Burns	Episode: "Jane Eyre"	
2025	The Chair Company	Natalie Trosper	Main Role	
2025	All Her Fault	Josephine "Josie" Murphy / Carrie Finch	6 episodes	
2025	It: Welcome to Derry	Beverly Marsh	Episode: "Winter Fire" (post-credits scene)	

=== Theatre ===
Year	Title	Role	Venue	Ref.
2026	Data	Riley	Off-Broadway, Lucille Lortel Theatre	

=== Music videos ===
Year	Artist	Title	Notes
2017	The War on Drugs	"Nothing to Find"	
2017	Sia	"Santa's Coming for Us"	

=== Video games ===
Year	Title	Role	Notes
TBA	OD	TBA	On-again / off-again "in development" since 2022

== Awards and nominations ==
Year	Award	Category	Work	Result	Ref
2017	New Mexico Film Critics	Best Young Actor/Actress	It	Won	
2017	San Diego Film Critics Society	Breakthrough Artist	It	Nominated	
2017	Seattle Film Critics Society	Best Youth Performance	It	Nominated	
2017	Washington D.C. Area Film Critics Association	Best Youth Performance	It	Nominated	
2018	Online Film & Television Association	Best Youth Performance	It	Nominated	
2018	Saturn Awards	Best Performance by a Younger Actor	It	Nominated	
2020	Music City Film Critics Association	Best Young Actress	It Chapter Two	Nominated	
2026	Critics' Choice Awards	Best Supporting Actress in a Movie/Miniseries	All Her Fault	Nominated	
