= Tony Magistrale =

American biographer

- Born: Anthony Samuel Magistrale
- Education: Allegheny College (BA); University of Pittsburgh (MA, PhD)
- Occupations: Academic, writer, professor
- Employer: University of Vermont (1983–present)
- Known for: Biographer of Stephen King

Anthony Samuel Magistrale is an American academic and writer, known primarily as a biographer of Stephen King and Edgar Allan Poe. Magistrale has worked as an English professor at the University of Vermont since 1983, receiving the Literary Laundry's Award of Distinction in 2011 for his poetry.

Magistrale received a Bachelor of Arts in 1974 from Allegheny College, before going on to the University of Pittsburgh to earn his Master of Arts in 1976 and Doctor of Philosophy in 1981. In 2000, Stephen King employed Magistrale as a research assistant. King reported to Magistrale that his iconic fictional Maine town of Derry is based on Bangor, Maine. Magistrale has provided commentary tracks for video releases of film adaptations of King's work, including on the 2018 Blu-ray release of Maximum Overdrive. He was interviewed in a 2017 documentary film Unearthed & Untold: The Path to Pet Sematary.
