= Woh =

Indian horror series

- Genre: Horror; Thriller
- Based on: It by Stephen King
- Directed by: Glen Baretto; Ankush Mohla
- Starring: See below
- Opening theme: Raju Singh
- Ending theme: Uttank Vora
- Country of origin: India
- Original language: Hindi
- No. of seasons: 1
- No. of episodes: 52

Production
- Producers: Noshir Desai; Bharat Sunder
- Cinematography: Deepak Malwankar
- Editor: Steven Bernard
- Camera setup: Multi-camera
- Running time: 25 minutes
- Production company: United Studios Ltd
- Budget: $2.3 million

Original release
- Network: Zee TV
- Release: 4 January – 27 December 1998

Related
- It

Woh (Hindi: वो, Vo, lit. that one) is a 52-episode Indian horror thriller television series which aired on Zee TV in 1998. The series starred Indian film director Ashutosh Gowarikar, and dwarf actor Lilliput in the title role. It is a Hindi-language TV show adaptation of Stephen King's epic horror novel It.

== Plot ==
Seven teenagers Ashutosh, Raja, Julie, Shiva, Ronnie, Sanjeev and Rahul battle an evil force that takes the form of a clown called Woh who kidnaps children, and free the town of Panchgani of his evil influence. They promise to return, if Woh ever returns. Fifteen years after they part ways, Ashutosh starts seeing balloons, at places where children are being kidnapped. He immediately recognises that Woh has returned and calls his friends to return.

All the friends return except Sanjeev who gets killed by Woh. The day they realise this, the police take the friends into custody, and they narrate how they battled Woh with the help of Samidha fifteen years ago. The police believe them and release them. They go and meet Samidha and she joins their group. They battle Woh with difficulty. That same day Ashutosh learns his wife is pregnant and Raja proposes to Samidha. All the friends return to their normal lives.

Bad omens occur during the birth of Ashutosh's child Siddharth. His doctor and Ashutosh's wife's aunt are mysteriously killed. Ashutosh's friends arrive for Siddharth's seventh birthday, and realise Woh has returned as Siddharth. They go to the same caves and discover from Woh's mother that he was her son, who was bullied by society because of his dwarfism. He killed himself and became a vengeful ghost. The friends convince him to leave Siddharth's body and help him attain salvation. Siddharth is saved and the story ends on a happy note.

== Cast ==
- Lilliput as Vikram / Woh
- Ashutosh Gowarikar as Ashutosh Dhar
  - Shreyas Talpade as Young Ashutosh Dhar
- Mamik Singh as Rahul Sahni
- Nasirr Khan as Raja
  - Ankur Javeri as Young Raja
- Anupam Bhattacharya as Sanjeev
  - Parag Nair as Young Sanjeev
- Amit Mistry as Ronnie Batliwala
  - Sumeet Goradia as Young Ronnie Batliwala
- Seema Shetty as Julie
  - Namrata Gaur as Young Julie
- Ankush Mohla as Shiva
  - Adesh Rathi as Young Shiva
- Sulabha Deshpande as the mother of Vikram / Woh

== Development ==
Woh was created by Ankush Mohla and Glen Barreto, neither of whom had read the original novel. The show is loosely based on the American miniseries It, with major plot points matching. However, Woh took creative liberties and added many elements that were not in the original novel or the miniseries, such as Woh's backstory. As Indian audiences were unfamiliar with the source material, the show did not gain much popularity and only ran for one season. The show had a low budget and did not make use of special effects.

== See also ==
- List of Hindi horror shows
