= Derry (Stephen King) =

Fictional town by Stephen King

- Stephen King location
- The town as pictured in It
- First appearance: "The Bird and the Album" (1981)
- Created by: Stephen King
- Genre: Horror fiction

In-universe information
- Type: Town
- Location: Maine

Derry is a fictional town in the U.S. state of Maine that has served as the setting for a number of Stephen King's novels, novellas, and short stories, notably It. Derry first appeared in King's 1981 short story "The Bird and the Album"; its most recent appearance was in his 2011 novel 11/22/63.

Derry is said to be near Bangor. However, King explicitly told his biographer, Tony Magistrale, that Derry is actually his portrayal of Bangor. A map on King's official website, though, places Derry in the vicinity of the town of Etna.

King, a native of Durham, Maine, created a trinity of fictional Maine towns—Derry, Castle Rock and Jerusalem's Lot—as central settings in more than one work.

== Overview ==
The town of Derry was first mentioned in Stephen King's 1981 short story "The Bird and the Album". While the town would be mentioned in various other stories, it was not until King's 1986 novel It when the town was used as a fully rendered setting.

Besides the oft-used trinity of Derry, Castle Rock, and Jerusalem's Lot, King has created other fictional Maine towns, including Haven in The Tommyknockers, Little Tall Island in Dolores Claiborne and Storm of the Century, Chester's Mill in Under the Dome, and Tarker's Mills in Cycle of the Werewolf.

In 2016, it was announced that a new adaptation of It would split the novel into a two-part motion picture. During production, the producers of the 2017 film adaptation and its 2019 sequel needed a small town in which to film, and Port Hope, Ontario, was used for much of the exterior work for both films. Some scenes said to be in Derry were shot elsewhere. The synagogue appearing in It Chapter Two was actually the Congregation Knesseth Israel in Toronto, while the Derry High school exteriors were filmed at the Mount Mary Retreat Centre in Ancaster, Ontario. Other Chapter 2 filming locations included the Scottish Rite Club in Hamilton, Ontario, Audley Park in Ajax, Ontario, and Rouge Park in Scarborough, Toronto (as The Barrens). So-called "horror house" exteriors were built for the films; both were located on the same property in Oshawa, Ontario.

== Locations within Derry ==
=== The house on 29 Neibolt Street ===
On several occasions in It, "the Losers Club" find themselves at 29 Neibolt Street, a run-down, abandoned house near the trainyard. It is here where Eddie Kaspbrak first encounters It, which shows itself as a mix between a homeless leper and its familiar Pennywise form. Later, after Eddie tells them his story, Bill and Richie go to investigate the house and are chased off by It, the creature having taken the form of a werewolf in Richie's mind, and Pennywise in Bill's mind.

Soon after these incidents, the Losers Club goes back to the house in hopes of confronting It. However, soon after they confront It, the creature disappears into the sewers through a toilet pipe. They, therefore, decide to enter the sewers for their first confrontation with It.

During It's 1985 killing spree, the bodies of two children are discovered at the house. One is found across the street from the house, and the other is found underneath the porch with no legs.

In the 2017 adaptation and its sequel, 29 Neibolt Street acts as the primary entrance to It's lair and the scene of the Losers Club's first real confrontation with It. The house is built on the location of Derry's old well house where 91 settlers disappeared when Derry was first settled, as well as a central hub for the town's sewer system. At the end of the second film, the house collapses along with It's lair when the Losers Club kills It.

=== The Barrens ===
The Barrens are a small tract of land still heavily covered in trees and plant life. Derry's landfill is located here, as is a gravel pit and several sewer pump stations. The Barrens play the most prominent role in It, as the Losers adopt them as their home away from home, even building an underground clubhouse there. Most of the Losers have their first meeting here while trying to build a small dam in the Kenduskeag Stream, which runs through the Barrens, and next to Derry.

In It Chapter Two, after being thrown into a well, Henry Bowers is washed out of the sewer system into the Barrens by a flash flood.

In 11/22/63, Jake Epping has a conversation with young Richie Tozier and Beverly Marsh from the novel It near the Barrens in September 1958, shortly after The Losers defeated It for the first time.

=== The Canal ===
A section of the Kenduskeag that runs through downtown Derry. The Canal goes through a tunnel under the streets for a short way and comes out in Bassey Park. In January 1958, a young Ben Hanscom first encounters It walking on top of the frozen surface. A few months later, Eddie Corcoran is decapitated here by It in the form of the Gill-man.

=== Derry Civic Center ===
The Derry Civic Center is a recent structure built after the old civic center was destroyed in the 1985 flood. It was designed by famed architect (and one-time Derry resident) Ben Hanscom. It plays an important role in the events of the novel Insomnia. The Crimson King, the supervillain of King's Dark Tower series, planned to use Ed Deepneau to fly into the Civic Center on a kamikaze mission, using a small plane armed with C4 explosives. The aim of this mission was not to kill the people inside the Center but to kill a child named Patrick Danville, who plays a key role in the Dark Tower story. Following an encounter with the Crimson King himself, Ralph Roberts and Lois Chasse force Deepneau to crash the plane in the Center's parking lot. Several people are killed, but Danville is ultimately saved.

=== Kitchener Ironworks ===
The Kitchener Ironworks was an ironworks outside of Derry. In 1906, despite every machine in the works having been shut completely down, the Ironworks inexplicably exploded, killing a group of 88 children and 102 total people who were participating in an Easter egg hunt. The tragedy was caused by It sabotaging the equipment, presumed to be responsible for eight missing bodies. This marked the beginning of the creature's 27-year hibernation period. It is at the ruins of the Kitchener Ironworks where a young Mike Hanlon first encounters It in the form of a giant bird in 1958.

In the 2017 adaptation, Ben Hanscom first encounters It in the form of a headless child who was among the victims of the Kitchener Ironworks incident, in the Derry Library.

In 11/22/63, at the Kitchener Works in October 1958, Jake Epping encounters the It from the novel It.

=== The Standpipe ===
The Standpipe was a large water tower in Derry. In its earlier days, it remained unlocked so that patrons of an adjoining park could climb a spiral staircase around the tank to look out over Derry from the top. The Standpipe was closed to the public after several children drowned in the tank, most likely the fault of It. The Standpipe is where Stan Uris first encounters It, which takes the form of drowned children.

After the grown-up Losers Club kills It in the second Ritual Of Chüd in 1985, a huge storm ensues, destroying the Standpipe and many buildings and landmarks in Derry. In Dreamcatcher, Mr. Gray drives to Derry to find the Standpipe, only to discover a memorial featuring a cast-bronze statue of two children and a plaque underneath, dedicated to the victims of the 1985 flood and of It. The plaque has been vandalized with graffiti reading "PENNYWISE LIVES". In 11/22/63, Jake Epping buys a pillow with a picture of the Standpipe on it. He hides a gun in it, the gun he uses to kill Frank Dunning.

=== Tracker Brothers Shipping ===
According to It, the Tracker Brothers were two men who owned a trucking depot on Kansas Street during It's 1958 killing spree. The brothers maintained a baseball field behind the depot for children to play on. In Dreamcatcher, Jonesy, the Beav, Henry, and Pete first meet Duddits in the depot's parking lot in 1978 (at which time the depot has closed), saving him from a gang of bullies. In 1985, while visiting the abandoned depot, Eddie Kaspbrak encounters Pennywise for the first time since his childhood. The depot was destroyed in the same 1985 storm that destroyed the Standpipe.

=== Voigt Field ===
In The Running Man, a Richard Bachman novella set in a dystopian future, Derry is home to a large airport consisting of acres of parking lots, a huge "Northern States Terminal", several runways with the capacity to support large widebody aircraft, and a large fuel tank farm. Ben Richards, the novella's protagonist, arrives here by car and is allowed to board a "Lockheed GA/Superbird" by bluffing that he has enough plastic explosive with him to blow up the entire complex.

== Literary works set in Derry ==
- It (1986)
- Secret Window, Secret Garden (1990)
- Insomnia (1994)
- Bag of Bones (1998) (partial)
- "The Road Virus Heads North" (1999) (partial) (short story from Everything's Eventual)
- Dreamcatcher (2001)
- "Fair Extension" (2010)
- 11/22/63 (partial) (2011)

== Works that refer to Derry ==
- The Running Man (1982)
- "The Body" (1982) (novella from Different Seasons)
- Pet Sematary (1983)
- "Uncle Otto's Truck" (1983) (short story from Skeleton Crew)
- "Mrs. Todd's Shortcut" (1984) (short story from Skeleton Crew)
- The Tommyknockers (1987)
- Misery (1987)
- "The Night Flier" (1988)
- "Secret Window, Secret Garden" (1990) (novella from Four Past Midnight)
- Needful Things (1991)
- Gerald's Game (1992)
- "Autopsy Room Four" (1997)
- Hearts in Atlantis (1999)
- Storm of the Century (1999)
- Dreamcatcher (2001)
- The Dark Tower VII: The Dark Tower (2004)
- Lisey's Story (2006)
- "Mute" (2007)
- Under the Dome (2009)
- Full Dark, No Stars (2010)
- 11/22/63 (2011)
- It (2017)
- Pet Sematary (2019)
- It Chapter Two (2019)
- Gwendy's Final Task (2022)
- You Like It Darker (2024)
- It: Welcome to Derry (2025–present)
- The Running Man (2025)

== In other media ==
- In the 1993 novel One on One, author Tabitha King, who is King's wife, refers to Derry. In an afterword, she thanks "another novelist who was kind enough to allow me" to use the town's name.
- In the 2010 television series Haven, loosely adapted from King's novel The Colorado Kid, the town of Derry is mentioned.
- In the 2010 novel Horns, author Joe Hill, who is King's oldest son, writes of the real city of Derry, New Hampshire. In his 2013 novel NOS4A2, Hill includes the fictional Derry, Maine on a map and a list of supernatural places.
- In the crime drama Criminal Minds, the 10th season episode "Mr. Scratch" cites Derry as the location of a murder induced by hallucination. The victim of the murder was named "Tabitha", after King's wife.
- The 2019 film adaptation of Pet Sematary shows a road sign referring to Derry as 20 miles away in one scene.
- The 2020 film Run refers to Derry as an example of a location to look up when the protagonist contacts 4-1-1.

== See also ==
- Derry, Castlerock and Bangor in Northern Ireland
