= The Shining (franchise) =

American horror franchise

- Logo of the first film
- Created by: Stephen King
- Original work: The Shining
- Owners: Warner Bros. Entertainment (Skydance)

Print publications
- Novels: The Shining; Doctor Sleep

Films and television
- Films: The Shining; Doctor Sleep
- Television series: The Shining

Audio
- Soundtracks: The Shining (Original Motion Picture Soundtrack); Doctor Sleep (Original Motion Picture Soundtrack)

The Shining is an American supernatural horror media franchise that originated from the 1977 novel of the same name by Stephen King. The novel was later adapted into a 1980 film and a 1997 television miniseries. King later wrote a 2013 sequel novel, Doctor Sleep, which was adapted to film in 2019.

The franchise revolves around the Torrance family as they experience the effects of supernatural entities and a mystical psychic power known as "the shining", an ability that allows a person to read minds, communicate telepathically and see horrific visions of the past and future.

== Films ==
The Shining films
Film	U.S. release date	Directed by	Screenplay by	Produced by
The Shining	May 23, 1980	Stanley Kubrick	Diane Johnson & Stanley Kubrick	Stanley Kubrick
Doctor Sleep	November 8, 2019	Mike Flanagan	Mike Flanagan	Jon Berg & Trevor Macy

The Shining story chronology
Original continuity
- The Shining (1980)
- Doctor Sleep (2019)
Miniseries continuity
- The Shining (1997)

=== The Shining (1980) ===
The Shining is a 1980 American psychological horror film based on the 1977 novel of the same name by Stephen King. The film tells the story of Jack Torrance, an aspiring writer and recovering alcoholic, who accepts a position as the off-season caretaker of the isolated historic Overlook Hotel in the Colorado Rockies. Wintering over with Jack are his wife, Wendy Torrance and young son, Danny Torrance. Danny possesses "the shining", psychic abilities that enable him to see into the hotel's horrific past. After a winter storm leaves the Torrances snowbound, Jack's sanity deteriorates due to the influence of the supernatural forces that inhabit the hotel, placing his wife and son in danger. Jack Nicholson stars as Jack Torrance, Shelley Duvall stars as Wendy Torrance, Danny Lloyd stars as Danny Torrance, and Scatman Crothers stars as Dick Hallorann.

The film was released in the United States on May 23, 1980, by Warner Bros. Reactions to the film at the time of its release were mixed; Stephen King criticized the film due to its deviations from the novel. Critical opinion has become more favorable and it is now widely regarded as one of the greatest and most influential horror films ever made and has become a staple of pop culture. In 2018, the film was selected for preservation in the United States National Film Registry by the Library of Congress as being "culturally, historically, or aesthetically significant".

=== Doctor Sleep (2019) ===
Doctor Sleep is a 2019 American supernatural horror film based on the 2013 novel of the same name by Stephen King, a sequel to King's 1977 novel The Shining. The film, which also serves as a direct sequel to the film adaptation of The Shining, directed by Stanley Kubrick, is set several decades after the events of the 1980 film. The film follows an older version of Danny Torrance, a man with psychic abilities who struggles with childhood trauma. Danny must protect a young girl with similar powers from a cult known as The True Knot, who prey on children with powers to remain immortal. Ewan McGregor stars as Danny Torrance.

Doctor Sleep was released in the United States on November 8, 2019. The film received generally positive reviews, with praise for its performances and atmosphere, but with some criticism for its lengthy runtime. Having grossed $72 million worldwide, its performance at the box office was considered to be disappointing due to the success of King adaptations such as It Chapter Two and Pet Sematary, earlier in the year.

=== Future ===
In November 2019, it was revealed that a follow-up film titled Hallorann, was in development with Mike Flanagan writing the screenplay with intentions to direct. The story was reported to center around Dick Hallorann and his origin story, while being classified as a sequel film. In August 2020, Flanagan confirmed that the project has been placed on an indefinite hold following the less-than-expected box office opening for Doctor Sleep, while noting that it may be revived in the future. In December 2025, following the success of the HBO series It: Welcome to Derry, plans for a spin-off focusing on Hallorann have been discussed.

Flanagan also stated that he is interested in directing a sequel focused on Abra Stone, and that he has discussed the idea with King, who was receptive to the idea.

== Television ==
=== The Shining (1997) ===
The Shining is a three-episode horror television miniseries based on the 1977 Stephen King novel of the same name. Directed by Mick Garris from King's teleplay, it is the second adaptation of King's book after the 1980 film by Stanley Kubrick. The adaptation stars Steven Weber as Jack Torrance, Rebecca De Mornay as Jack's wife Wendy, Courtland Mead and Wil Horneff as different-aged versions of Danny Torrance, and Melvin Van Peebles as Dick Hallorann.

The Shining opened to overwhelming praise from critics when it aired in 1997, which included a 10/10 review from TV Guide. The miniseries' "carefully" and "masterfully crafted" pacing was highlighted by several reviewers, including Ray Richmond of Variety, who also noted its "edge-of-your-seat creepiness" and "surprising emotional complexity and depth". The depth and creepiness was also praised by Ken Tucker of Entertainment Weekly. However, Tom Shales of The Washington Post advised his readers to "avoid [the miniseries] like the plague, because it is the plague".

=== Overlook (TBA) ===
In April 2020, a spin-off television series titled Overlook was announced to be in-development under the direction of J. J. Abrams as an HBO Max streaming service exclusive release. Abrams with his business partner/wife, Katie McGrath will executive produce the show alongside series writers Dustin Thomason and Scott Brown.

Originally conceived and greenlit as a prequel film titled Overlook Hotel with Mark Romanek and Glen Mazzara attached as director and screenwriter, respectively, the project was confirmed abandoned prior to the series order. The project was to be a joint-venture production between Bad Robot Productions, and Warner Bros. TV Group collectively. Additionally, Warner Bros. Entertainment organized a writers room to continue working on scripts for the series, during the industry shutdown due to the COVID-19 pandemic.

In February 2021, head of HBO Casey Bloys said that "they're busily working away at Bad Robot". By August of the same year however, though HBO Max executives liked the project they felt it did not fit their slate and it was decided that the series would not move forward at HBO Max. Warner Bros. Television was shopping the series around to other streaming services before it was picked up by Netflix the following year. The series has not been produced as of 2026.

== Development ==
=== The Shining ===
Before making The Shining, Kubrick directed the film Barry Lyndon (1975), a highly visual period film about an Irishman who attempts to make his way into the British aristocracy. Despite its technical achievements, the film was not a box-office success in the United States and was derided by critics for being too long and too slow. Kubrick, disappointed with Barry Lyndon's lack of success, realized he needed to make a film that would be commercially viable as well as artistically fulfilling. Stephen King was told that Kubrick had his staff bring him stacks of horror books as he planted himself in his office to read them all: "Kubrick's secretary heard the sound of each book hitting the wall as the director flung it into a reject pile after reading the first few pages. Finally one day the secretary noticed it had been a while since she had heard the thud of another writer's work biting the dust. She walked in to check on her boss and found Kubrick deeply engrossed in reading The Shining".

Speaking about the theme of the film, Kubrick stated that "there's something inherently wrong with the human personality. There's an evil side to it. One of the things that horror stories can do is to show us the archetypes of the unconscious; we can see the dark side without having to confront it directly". Nicholson was Kubrick's first choice for the role of Jack Torrance; other actors considered included Robert De Niro (who claims the film gave him nightmares for a month), Robin Williams, and Harrison Ford, all of whom met with Stephen King's disapproval. In his search to find the right actor to play Danny, Kubrick sent a husband and wife team, Leon and Kersti Vitali, to Chicago, Denver, and Cincinnati to create an interview pool of 5,000 boys over a six-month period. These cities were chosen since Kubrick was looking for a boy with an accent which fell in between Jack Nicholson's and Shelley Duvall's speech patterns.

Having chosen King's novel as a basis for his next project, and after a pre-production phase, Kubrick had sets constructed on soundstages at EMI Elstree Studios in Borehamwood, Hertfordshire, England. Some of the interior designs of the Overlook Hotel set were based on those of the Ahwahnee Hotel in Yosemite National Park. To enable him to shoot the scenes in chronological order, he used several stages at EMI Elstree Studios in order to make all sets available during the complete duration of production. The set for the Overlook Hotel was at the time the largest ever built at Elstree, including a life-size re-creation of the exterior of the hotel. In February 1979, the set at Elstree was badly damaged in a fire, causing a delay in the production.

=== Doctor Sleep ===
Warner Bros. Pictures began developing a film adaptation of Doctor Sleep as early as 2014. In 2016, filmmaker Akiva Goldsman was attached to write and produce the film for Warner Bros. For several years, Warner Bros. could not secure a budget for Doctor Sleep, or for a different project, a prequel to The Shining called Overlook Hotel.

In late 2017, Warner Bros. released It, a film adaptation of King's 1986 novel of the same name, and its box office success led the studio to fast track production of Doctor Sleep. In January 2018, Warner Bros. hired Mike Flanagan to rewrite Goldsman's script and direct the film, with Goldsman receiving executive producer credit. On why he was interested in directing Doctor Sleep, Flanagan explained: "It touches on themes that are the most attractive to me, which are childhood trauma leading into adulthood, addiction, the breakdown of a family, and the after effects, decades later".

From June to November, the cast was assembled.

Filming began in September in the U.S. state of Georgia; locations included Atlanta and St. Simons. In the area of Atlanta, specific locations included Covington, Canton, Stone Mountain, Midtown, Porterdale, and Fayetteville. Production concluded in December.

The film score was composed by The Newton Brothers (Andy Grush and Taylor Stewart), who also composed scores for Flanagan's previous works. WaterTower Music has released the film score.

=== Television ===
==== The Shining ====
The creation of this miniseries is attributed to Stephen King's dissatisfaction with director Stanley Kubrick's 1980 film of the same name. In order to receive Kubrick's approval to re-adapt The Shining into a program closer to the original story, King had to agree in writing to eschew his frequent public criticism of Kubrick's film, save for the sole commentary that he was disappointed with Jack Nicholson's portrayal of Jack Torrance as though he had been insane before his arrival at the Overlook Hotel. ABC's success with previous miniseries adaptations of King's work, such as It (1990), The Tommyknockers (1993), and The Stand (1994), made them more than willing to offer the author to work on the screenplay for The Shining miniseries with small Broadcast Standards and Practices enforced.

The casting team had a very difficult time finding an actor for the role of Jack Torrance as most of the considerations who rejected the role worried about being compared to Nicholson's performance in the Kubrick version. Two of the many actors considered included Tim Daly and Gary Sinise. King got very impatient, threatening to "wait another 18 years" if the role for Jack Torrance wasn't booked. Finally, via a suggestion from Rebecca De Mornay, Steven Weber was chosen for the role, four days before filming began. Weber accepted the offer because he was a fan of the Mick Garris-directed miniseries for The Stand and found the script he read to be "multi-layered" and relatable. King was the one who chose De Mornay for the role of Wendy. The producers approached her in 1994, and she accepted the role, enjoying the script for being more "scary", "disturbing", "entertaining", and closer to the novel than the Kubrick version.

Aside from the motive behind the creation of the miniseries, the 1997 rendition featured an important set piece that helped to inspire the original story: The Stanley Hotel in Estes Park, Colorado. King used the hotel that inspired him to write the book as the miniseries' location, with some interior shots in stages also in Denver. Garris tried to make the hotel feel as "enclosed" as possible to add a vibe of claustrophobia when in a closed hotel; the crew did this by emphasizing the "darkness" of the hotel, painting some of Stanley's areas that had recently been painted white brown.

The production team began shooting at the Stanley Hotel in March 1997, the date chosen as it was Denver's snowiest month. However, on the day filming began, they realized the hotel as well as most of Estes Park was in a "snow shadow", meaning it garnered the least amount of snow out of all Denver areas. As a result, they spent $100,000 in snowmaking machines sent from Los Angeles while lucking out on "three or four" shooting days with actual snow falling on Estes. Producer Mark Carliner attributed the lucky snowfalls to a Ute shaman doing a ritual at the highest peak of the Rocky Mountains. The cast and crew, such as Cynthia Garris, Mick Garris' wife who plays the woman in Room 217; and Dawn Jeffrey-Nelson, Courtland Mead's acting coach claimed paranormal experiences occurring at the hotel during shooting.

Some of the cast enjoyed working on The Shining. Mead "wasn't scared" as he had acted previously in horror films like Hellraiser: Bloodline (1996); John Durbin enjoyed the "madness" he got to portray with his character of Horace Derwent; and Stanley Anderson, who accepted the part of Delbert Grady based on his disappointment with the Kubrick version, tried to play the character "real" but with "a sense of distance to [his] view of the other and the world, so it comes out as irony or wryness". However, it was tough for Weber to play his character; because the scenes were not shot in chronological order, it was very difficult to master the character's mental state deterioration, due to it occurring gradually as the story progresses.

==== Overlook ====
In September 2019, J. J. Abrams and his production company, Bad Robot Productions, signed an exclusive deal to produce projects for Warner Bros. Seven months later, HBO Max announced to develop a spin-off series of the novel The Shining, titled Overlook. The new series was to consist of 10 episodes. Overlook aims to focus on the untold stories of the Overlook Hotel from the novel, before the Torrances' arrival. Abrams will produce the series through his Bad Robot banner, alongside Ben Stephenson and Rachel Rusch Rich. However, by August 2021, the show did not move forward on HBO Max, and was later picked up by Netflix.

== Main cast and characters ==
List indicators

This section includes characters who will appear or have appeared in notable roles in the franchise.

- An empty grey cell indicates the character was not in the film, or that the character's official presence has not yet been confirmed.
- ^{A} indicates an appearance through archival footage or audio.
- ^{O} indicates an older version of the character.
- ^{V} indicates a voice-only role.
- ^{Y} indicates a younger version of the character.

Character	Films		Miniseries
Character	The Shining	Doctor Sleep	The Shining
Character	1980	2019	1997
John "Jack" Torrance	Jack Nicholson	Henry Thomas Jack Nicholson^{A}	Steven Weber
Winnifred "Wendy" Torrance	Shelley Duvall	Alex Essoe Shelley Duvall^{A}	Rebecca De Mornay
Daniel "Danny / Tony" Torrance	Danny Lloyd	Ewan McGregor Roger Dale Floyd^{Y} Danny Lloyd^{Y}^{A}	Courtland Mead Wil Horneff^{O}
Richard "Dick" Hallorann	Scatman Crothers	Carl Lumbly Scatman Crothers^{A}	Melvin Van Peebles
Stuart Ullman	Barry Nelson		Elliott Gould
Bill Watson	Barry Dennen		Pat Hingle
Lloyd	Joe Turkel		
The Grady Girls	Lisa Burns & Louise Burns	Sadie Heim & KK Heim Kaitlyn McCormick & Molly Jackson^{V}	
Delbert Grady	Philip Stone	Michael Monks	Stanley Anderson
Lorraine Massey Room 237 Ghost	Lia Beldam Billie Gibson	Sally Hooks	Cynthia Garris
Horace Derwent Apparition with Gash	Norman Gay	Hugh Maguire	John Durbin
Abra Stone		Kyleigh Curran Dakota Hickman^{Y}	
Rose O'Hara Rose the Hat		Rebecca Ferguson	
Dr. John Dalton		Bruce Greenwood	
Lucia "Lucy Stone (née Reynolds)		Jocelin Donahue	
Billy Freeman		Cliff Curtis	
Dave Stone		Zackary Momoh	
Bradley Trevor		Jacob Tremblay	
Crow Daddy		Zahn McClarnon	
Snakebite Andi		Emily Alyn Lind	
Gramdpa Flick		Carel Struycken	

== Additional crew and production details ==
Title	Crew/Detail					
Title	Composers	Cinematographer	Editor	Production companies	Distributing company	Running time
The Shining (1980)	Wendy Carlos; Rachel Elkind	John Alcott	Ray Lovejoy	Hawk Films; Peregrine Productions; The Producer Circle Company	Warner Bros. Pictures (US); Columbia-EMI-Warner Distributors (UK)	144 minutes
The Shining (miniseries)	Nicholas Pike	Shelly Johnson	Patrick McMahon	Lakeside Productions; Warner Bros. Television	ABC	273 minutes
Doctor Sleep	Andy Grush; Taylor Newton Stewart	Michael Fimognari	Mike Flanagan	Intrepid Pictures; Vertigo Entertainment	Warner Bros. Pictures	152 minutes

== Reception ==
=== Box office and financial performance ===
Film	Box office gross			Box office ranking		Home video total	Gross income	Budget	Net income	Ref(s)
Film	North America	Other territories	Worldwide	All time North America	All time worldwide	Home video total	Gross income	Budget	Net income	Ref(s)
The Shining	$44,568,631	$727,542	$45,296,173	#1,959	#9,613	$10,130,294	$55,426,467	$19,000,000	$36,426,467	
Doctor Sleep	$31,581,712	$40,800,000	$72,381,712	#2,707	#2,021	$9,073,129	$81,454,841	$45,000,000	$36,454,841	
Total	$76,150,343	$41,800,000	$117,677,885	x̄2,333	x̄5,817	$19,203,423	$136,881,308	$64,000,000	$72,881,308	

=== Critical and public response ===
Film	Rotten Tomatoes	Metacritic	CinemaScore
The Shining	84% (110 reviews)	68/100 (26 reviews)	—N/a
Doctor Sleep	78% (339 reviews)	59/100 (56 reviews)	B+

== See also ==
- List of adaptations of works by Stephen King
- List of books by Stephen King
