= Doctor Sleep =

Doctor Sleep may refer to:

- Doctor Sleep, a 1991 novel by Madison Smartt Bell
  - Doctor Sleep (2002 film) (also known as Close Your Eyes), a British thriller film based on Bell's novel
- Doctor Sleep (novel), a 2013 horror novel by Stephen King
  - Doctor Sleep (2019 film), an American horror film based on King's novel
