= Stephen King's The Shining =

Stephen King's The Shining may refer to:

- The Shining (novel)
- The Shining (film)
- The Shining (miniseries)
