= Rose the Hat =

- The Shining character
- Rebecca Ferguson as Rose the Hat in Doctor Sleep
- First appearance: Doctor Sleep (2013)
- Created by: Stephen King
- Portrayed by: Rebecca Ferguson

In-universe information
- Full name: Rose O'Hara
- Aliases: Irish Rose, Rose the Hat, Queen Bitch
- Species: Psychic vampire
- Gender: Female
- Occupation: Cult leader, serial killer
- Family: True Knot
- Origin: County Antrim, Northern Ireland

Rose the Hat is a fictional character created by American writer Stephen King. She is the primary antagonist in his 2013 novel Doctor Sleep and in the 2019 film of the same name, in which she is played by Swedish actress Rebecca Ferguson.

== Characterization ==
Rose is the authoritarian leader of a nomadic group of nearly-immortal psychic vampires known as the "True Knot" who feed on children with psychic abilities. They hunt for children because, as Rose explains to Danny Torrance in the film's final act, "the steam becomes corrupted as people grow up". Commenting on Rose's personality, Ferguson said:

She's so sexual and predatory and loving and caring and she has all the elements of what a human being has that has all the elements of a zest for life. And that mixed with a fucking great sense of style, let's call a spade a spade, it's very liberating, getting all of these aspects in one character.

Rose's appearance in the movie is reminiscent to that of a hippie, and she has a penchant for going barefoot. This detail was not present in the original novel, and was influenced by Ferguson's own barefoot habit:

When you read the book, Rose's style isn’t described as a hippie style. I had created my own mood board for Rose without talking to the costume designer at all, or the hair designer, and all of us had the same idea. When we saw all the mood boards, we were all filtering this Woodstock, hippie-esque sexual creature, which was great. Selfishly, I love being barefoot and wearing comfy clothes.

== Reception ==
Critics praised both the character and Ferguson's portrayal, stating that her performance may be her career best to date. Lindsey Romain of Nerdist mentioned, "On first glance, she looks like a woman in an Anthropologie catalogue—not a character plucked from the pages of a modern horror novel. But this is Rose the Hat, the lead villain in Mike Flanagan's adaptation of Stephen King's Doctor Sleep. Played by Rebecca Ferguson, she's disarmingly terrifying. She looks out at the night sky not with wistfulness, but with hunger. The world is decaying around her, and she intends to suck it dry." Brian Tallerico of RogerEbert.com said, "The best thing about Flanagan's film by some stretch is the work by Rebecca Ferguson. The director of Gerald's Game and Hush proves again to be a very capable filmmaker when it comes to directing actresses, getting Ferguson's career-best work to date. She walks away with the film as a presence that's somehow both captivating and terrifying. Her take on Rose the Hat turns a thin character on the page into a great villain, someone who uses her good looks and charisma to disguise her evil intentions."

Brian Davids of The Hollywood Reporter commented, "Rebecca Ferguson has worn many hats throughout her career, but the role of Rose the Hat in Doctor Sleep might be her best fit yet." Yolanda Machado of GQ added, "Perhaps it's this entrancing aura about her that made Doctor Sleep writer-director Mike Flanagan cast Ferguson as one of Stephen King's most intoxicating villains, Rose the Hat, in his new film. Rose is a character unlike any other. Rose is alluring, sensual, tough, and feminine all at once, maternal enough... Rose is a character who needs to be able to win a child's trust with a smile, yet, in a moment's notice, can order and perform a long, torturous execution of a trusting boy who begs for his life wearing his little league uniform."

=== Accolades ===
In 2020, Ferguson won the Fangoria Chainsaw Award as Best Supporting Actress for her portrayal of Rose the Hat. In 2019, she was also nominated by the Seattle Film Critics Society as Best Villain.

== See also ==
- List of barefooters
