= Doctor Sleep (soundtrack) =

Doctor Sleep (Original Motion Picture Soundtrack)

Film score by the Newton Brothers
- Released: November 1, 2019
- Recorded: 2018–2019
- Studio: Raleigh, Hollywood; Capitol, Hollywood; Eastwood Scoring Stage, Warner Bros., Burbank; Sound City, Los Angeles; The Debney Building, Los Angeles
- Genre: Film score
- Length: 87:45
- Label: WaterTower Music
- Producer: The Newton Brothers

The Newton Brothers chronology
Mary (2019)	Doctor Sleep (Original Motion Picture Soundtrack) (2019)	Line of Duty (2019)

Doctor Sleep (Original Motion Picture Soundtrack) is the film score soundtrack to the 2019 film Doctor Sleep, directed by Mike Flanagan. An adaptation of the 2013 novel of the same name by Stephen King and sequel to Stanley Kubrick's 1980 film The Shining, the film's musical score is composed by the Newton Brothers whose score draws influences from the music of the predecessor and incorporated its main title theme into the score. The soundtrack was released under the WaterTower Music label on November 1, 2019.

== Background and development ==
In December 2018, it was reported that the Newton Brothers—a duo of Andy Grush and Taylor Stewart, who previously collaborated in all of Flanagan's works, since Oculus (2018)—had been assigned to score music for Doctor Sleep. The duo had been heavily inspired by the music of The Shining, and also adapted the main title theme "Dies Irae".

Flanagan presented the script of Doctor Sleep to the duo while they were also mixing the score for The Haunting of Hill House (2018). He further insisted them that the music should be bigger with interesting sounds, while adding that he wanted the emotional content and dread of The Shining but also to be expanded in its own way so that it would be woven into the musical landscape curated for the film. The duo then took two different approaches for scoring the film, at first they went with melodic ideas and then decided on constructing the soundscape and tonal ideas which went for a couple of months. Later, they visited Flanagan during the film's production in Atlanta and discussed about his musical intentions, where he wanted it to be tonally driven and resulted it to construct the melodies at sporadic situations. They also wanted the film to have its own soundscape unlike The Shining, which borrowed its soundtrack from needle drops mostly from the late-20th century classical music.

The duo recalled the Flanagan wanted to interpret the 20th century classical music into the score and also incorporate the "Dies Irae" title theme as well. They followed the 12-tone structure for the music and constructed the score at that range. Grush recalled that the piece for a particular melody was constructed in V-flat, and when Flanagan contacted them while supervising the compositions on his IPad, he thought on trying the theme to A-flat which unlocked a series of themes constructed for the film.

== Composition ==
Besides composing, the duo also supervised on the sound effects. Initially, they thought on altering the woodwinds to produce a weird sound that led them to research on wind harps. After talking to manufacturers and travelling to places all over the world, they ended on buying a 90-feet tall wind harp located in a small park in San Francisco. They recorded the sounds of the harp in sync with the wind and manipulated the noises which produced low howling and high weird sounds which were processed manually. They also recorded wind chimes which were processed before recording them. Stewart produced vocal recordings through his modular gears and manipulated those sounds.

The duo recorded the Hurdy Grande, a 20-feet long hurdy gurdy instrument and ancient percussions and bass flutes, which were pitched down after recording, to represent the True Knot cult. They also recorded chimes, tubular bells and bowls for different characters. During the orchestra recording, the orchestrator split the players into three parts, where the violins are recorded in three different sections that are recorded seamlessly to produce a non-stagnant sound.

== Reception ==
Angelica Jade Bastién of Vulture wrote "A score by the Newton Brothers thumps like an errant heartbeat." Michael Roffman of Consequence wrote "At a time when horror scores are so often relegated as forgettable filler, the Newtons really do make a case for placing a precedence on sound again." Brian B. of MovieWeb wrote "The astute listener will recognize occasional musical call backs to the iconic theme from the 1980 adaptation of The Shining." Sandy Schaefer of Screen Rant wrote that the duo's score "give the film the same chilly look and atmosphere as the storyteller's previous output".

Paul Shirey of JoBlo.com wrote "the score to the film is a stand out, hitting all the right beats for atmosphere and, of course, those pesky jump scares, which are peppered throughout to keep you alert". described it as a "moody" score. Clarrise Loughrey of The Independent wrote "Wendy Carlos and Rachel Elkind's original score, with those electronic notes that sound like foghorns, only appears once. Otherwise, it's a more conventional mix of orchestral groans and violin shrieks by the Newton brothers, punctured by the sound of a beating heart."

== Track listing ==
Doctor Sleep (Original Motion Picture Soundtrack) track listing
No.	Title	Length
1.	"Dies Irae / Violet (Incorporating The Shining Main Title)"	0:51
2.	"237"	3:04
3.	"Mrs. Massey"	1:06
4.	"Please Talk Please"	0:51
5.	"The Shining"	5:58
6.	"Lockbox"	1:05
7.	"Rattlesnake"	3:01
8.	"Spoons"	0:55
9.	"The Hat, the Snake & Dan"	3:05
10.	"Turning"	2:38
11.	"Gaucher's Disease"	1:07
12.	"Doctor Sleep"	2:11
13.	"#19"	1:27
14.	"Steam"	3:21
15.	"Redrum"	1:42
16.	"The Looker"	2:42
17.	"Astral Projection"	3:03
18.	"Who's Tony?"	2:41
19.	"Chimes & Outside Voices"	1:39
20.	"Rose Traveling"	4:17
21.	"Grampa Flick"	3:22
22.	"The Things That Lived There"	3:48
23.	"That Which Was Forgotten"	1:05
24.	"The True Knot"	2:06
25.	"Ventriloquism"	2:27
26.	"Radio Waves"	1:00
27.	"Going West"	3:27
28.	"The Overlook"	1:20
29.	"You Seem Put Upon"	4:08
30.	"Bloody Elevators"	2:45
31.	"Enough!"	1:52
32.	"Ventus"	2:51
33.	"The Hedge Maze, Pt. 1"	1:56
34.	"The Hedge Maze, Pt. 2"	2:06
35.	"Old Ghosts"	2:55
36.	"We Go On"	3:53
Total length:		87:45

== Credits ==
Credits adapted from WaterTower Music.

- Music composer and producer – The Newton Brothers
- Programming – James Burkholder, S. Peace Nistades
- Recording – Jay Cloidt (hurdy gurdy), Max Hirtenstein (wind harp)
- Mixing – Snacky, Jonathan Wales, Matt Ward
- Mastering – Patricia Sullivan
- Score editor – Mary Webster
- Soundtrack co-ordinator – Kari Miazek

Orchestra

- Orchestra – The Hollywood Studio Symphony
- Orchestrated and conducted by – Mark Graham
- Orchestra contractor – Gina Zimmitti
- Assistant orchestra contractor – Whitney Martin
- Concertmaster – Charlie Bisharat

Instruments

- Bass – Bill "B.J." Johnson, Chris Kollgaard, Dave Parmeter, Drew Dembowski, Ed Meares, Geoff Osika, Ian Walker, Oscar Hidalgo, Thomas Harte, Mike Valerio
- Bassoon – Anthony Parnther, Damian Montano, Ken Munday, Rose Corrigan
- Cello – Armen Ksajikian, Cecilia Tsan, Charlie Tyler, Dennis Karmazyn, Eric Byers, Giovanna Clayton, Julie Jung, Mike Kaufman, Ross Gasworth, Trevor Handy, Vanessa Freebairn Smith, Tim Loo
- Clarinet – Dan Higgins, Don Foster, Joshua Ranz, Stuart Clark
- Flute – Ben Smolen, Jenni Olson, Johanna Borenstein, Heather Clark
- French horn – Allen Fogle, Dan Kelley, Laura Brenes, Mark Adams, Teag Reaves, Dylan Hart
- Harp – Cristina Montes Mateo
- Hurdy gurdy – Paul Dresher
- Oboe – Lara Wickes
- Percussion – Matt Chamberlain, Michael Chavez, Pete Korpela, Randy Cooke, Brian Kilgore
- Piano, celeste – Robert Thies
- Timpani – Wade Culbreath
- Trombone – Bill Reichenbach, Phil Keen, Steve Holtman, Alex Iles
- Tuba – P. Blake Cooper, Doug Tornquist
- Viola – Aaron Oltman, Alma Fernandez, Andrew Duckles, Caroline Buckman, Dave Walther, Erik Rynearson, Zach Dellinger, Jonathan Moerschel, Luke Maurer, Meredith Crawford, Shawn Mann, Rob Brophy
- Violin – Ana Landauer, Andrew Bulbrook, Armen Anassian, Ashoka Thiagarajan, Ben Jacobson, Camille Miller, Daphne Chen, Eun-Mee Ahn, Grace Oh, Helen Nightengale, Ina Veli, Jackie Brand, Jenny Takamatsu, Jessica Guideri, Joel Pargman, Josefina Vergara, Katie Sloan, Leah Zeger, Luanne Homzy, Lucia Micarelli, Maia Jasper, Marisa Sorajja, Marisa Kuney, Mark Robertson, Natalie Leggett, Paul Cartwright, Phil Levy, Radu Pieptea, Sara Parkins, Sarah Thornblade, Songa Lee, Tammy Hatwan, Tereza Stanislav, Alyssa Park, Bruce Dukov

Vocals

- Choir contractor – Edie Lehmann Boddicker
- Alto – Angie Jarée, Baraka May Williams, Edie Lehmann Boddicker
- Baritone – Abdiel Gonzalez, Tim Davis
- Bass – Reid Bruton
- Soprano – Allie Feder, Anna Schubert, Diane Freiman-Reynolds, Elissa Johnston, Elyse Willis, Suzanne Waters
- Tenor – Greg Whipple, Michael Lichtenauer
