= The Shining (opera) =

American opera based on the novel by Stephen King

- Opera by Paul Moravec
- Librettist: Mark Campbell
- Based on: The Shining by Stephen King
- Premiere: May 7, 2016; Minnesota Opera, Saint Paul

The Shining is an American opera in two acts and an epilogue, with music by composer Paul Moravec and a libretto by Mark Campbell, based on the 1977 novel by Stephen King. The opera received its world premiere on May 7, 2016 at the Ordway Music Theater, Saint Paul, Minnesota. It is part of the "New Works Initiative" of Minnesota Opera.

== Background and composition ==
The idea for an opera based on the Stephen King novel originated with Eric Simonson, who directed the premiere production of the resulting work, and Minnesota Opera Artistic Director Dale Johnson. Moravec and Campbell deliberately designed their opera to hew more closely to King's original novel, compared to the 1980 film directed by Stanley Kubrick. They worked on the opera for three years.

In addition to Simonson as director of the premiere production, other members of the production team included Heidi Spesard-Noble (choreographer), Erhard Rom (scenery and properties designer), Kärin Kopischke (costume designer), Robert Wierzel (lighting designer), and C Andrew Mayer (sound designer).

== Roles ==
| Role | Voice type | Premiere cast, May 7, 2016 (Conductor: Michael Christie) | East Coast cast, September 15, 2023 (Conductor: Timothy Myers) |
|---|---|---|---|
| Jack Torrance | baritone | Brian Mulligan | Craig Irvin Thomas Glass |
| Wendy Torrance | soprano | Kelly Kaduce | Kelly Kaduce Kearstin Piper Brown |
| Danny Torrance | spoken child role | Alejandro Vega | Max Walls Adrienne Ocfemia |
| Dick Hallorann | baritone | Arthur Woodley | Kevin Deas Aubrey Allicock |
| Mark Torrance | baritone | Mark Walters | Malcolm MacKenzie |
| Delbert Grady | tenor | David Walton | Victor Ryan Robertson |
| Horace Derwent | baritone | Alex Ritchie | Andrew Gilstrap |
| Lloyd the Bartender | tenor | John Robert Lindsey | Kameron Lopreore |
| Stuart Ullman | tenor | Robb Asklof | Victor Ryan Robertson |
| Bill Watson | tenor | Rick Penning | Kameron Lopreore |
| Mrs. Massey | soprano | Shannon Prickett | Eva Lukkonen |
| Mrs. Grady | soprano | Jeni Houser | Gabrielle Bennett |

== Synopsis ==
The following is based on the original synopsis by librettist Mark Campbell.

In Acts I and II, the setting is the Overlook Hotel in Colorado, from late September to mid-November 1975.

=== Act I ===
On the last weekend of September 1975, Jack Torrance, his wife Wendy, and his son Danny arrive at the Overlook Hotel, in a remote location in the Colorado Rockies, as Jack has been engaged as winter caretaker at the hotel. Wendy and Jack welcome this development in their lives, in the hope that it will bring the family closer together. Jack, a writer, is also grateful for time to finish his play. The hotel's general manager, Stuart Ullman, gives the Torrances a tour of the hotel and speaks of its famous guests. The family then meets Dick Hallorann, the hotel cook, who shows Wendy and Danny around the kitchen.

Ullman privately tells Jack of concerns about his past personal history, which includes physical abuse and alcoholism. Jack assures Ullman that he has surmounted his problems. Bill Watson takes Jack to the basement and gives him instructions about boiler maintenance. Watson also reveals stories about the hotel's past: an earlier caretaker, Delbert Grady, killed his wife and two daughters, and then himself. A guest, Mrs Massey, committed suicide in a bathtub after her young lover abandoned her.

In parallel, outside the hotel, Hallorann informs Danny of his sense that Danny possesses a second sight, the "shining", which Hallorann's grandmother detected in him as a child. Hallorann also tells Danny that fears about the hotel can be controlled, and that Danny should call out to him if the Torrance family is in danger. Ullman, Watson, and Hallorann say farewell to the Torrances, leaving the family alone on the hotel porch.

Several weeks later in the caretaker's quarters, Wendy reads Treasure Island to Danny as Jack works on his play. As Danny leaves to brush his teeth before bedtime, the couple affirms their love for each other. Danny is trapped in the bathroom, but escapes. Traumatized, he claims that he saw dark visions. Jack tries to shake Danny out of his trauma. Wendy stops him and reveals that Jack once injured Danny. She plans to bring Danny to the local doctor the next day for examination. Wendy puts Danny to bed and sings him a lullaby. Jack remembers his own childhood abuse at the hands of his father, Mark Torrance. Danny utters the word "Redrum", which Wendy dismisses as a reaction to Treasure Island.

Several days later, Jack sifts through boxes of memorabilia in the basement. He finds a scrapbook assembled by "The Manager", and from it learns more about the hotel's infamous past. This includes Horace Derwent's sale of the hotel to the Mafia, and a subsequent Mafia killing at the hotel years later. He also reads more about the Grady family and Mrs. Massey. An invitation to a New Year's Eve masked ball drops from the scrapbook. This inspires Jack to tell the story of the hotel. Wendy and Danny return from the doctor, who has examined Danny and found nothing wrong. Wendy notes Jack's growing obsession with the Overlook Hotel, and requests that they leave immediately. Jack dismisses the suggestion. He goes into town and calls Mr. Ullman, who gets very angry. Later that day Al Shockley calls Jack and tells him not to make Ullman mad and not to write a book about the Overlook.

In the first week of November, strange noises awaken Wendy, and Danny runs into his parents' bedroom in a panic. Jack checks the elevator and then the ballroom, where he momentarily hears people. He sees a dog mask and a large croquet mallet. Shaken, Jack composes himself before returning to the quarters to reassure Wendy. Wendy still believes that they should leave the hotel.

Danny has walked by Room 217 several times, and one day in mid-November, finally enters that room. In the hotel office, a ranger on the CB radio warns Jack of an upcoming blizzard. The ranger's voice then suddenly becomes the voice of his father Mark, who tells Jack to kill his family. Jack smashes the radio with the croquet mallet. Wendy comes in, and is appalled to see that Jack has destroyed their only contact with the outside world. Danny appears with his clothes wet, bruises around his neck, and lipstick marks on his face. Jack tries to protect his family. The structure of the hotel suddenly collapses and reveals all of its apparitions, including Delbert Grady, Mrs Massey, Horace Derwent, and the guests of the New Year's Eve party. Danny cries out for Hallorann as snow begins to fall.

=== Act II ===
In late November, Jack goes to the basement for the boiler’s daily maintenance. Grady appears and encourages Jack to "correct the errors" of Danny and Wendy, in the same manner as Grady's treatment of his wife and daughters. Grady then invites Jack to the masked ball. In the caretaker's quarters, Danny tells his mother that "they" have gotten to his father. Wendy tries to mitigate Danny's fears. Once Danny is alone, however, he again calls out for Hallorann.

Jack joins the masked ball in the ballroom, and orders drinks from Lloyd, the bartender. Onstage, Horace Derwent, Grady, and Lloyd sing, and Mark Torrance then joins them, as eventually does Jack. Jack collapses and the party dissolves. Finding Jack sprawled on the floor, Wendy tries to help him back to their quarters, but Jack attempts to strangle her. Wendy smashes a bottle over Jack's head, and she and Danny lock the unconscious Jack inside the pantry. Jack revives and demands to be released. Wendy takes a large knife from the kitchen and leaves with Danny. Jack frees himself from the pantry, with assistance from Grady.

In the caretaker’s quarters, Wendy tries to calm Danny, and then returns to the kitchen for food. In the ballroom, Wendy sees apparitions, but convinces herself that they are not real. Jack suddenly jumps out from behind the bar and attacks her with the mallet. Wendy plunges the knife into Jack's back and runs back to the quarters, locking the door. Jack follows her and almost breaks through the door, when Wendy slices Jack's hands with razors that she has earlier retrieved from the bathroom. Grady and Derwent appear to Jack, telling him to kill Wendy later, as Hallorann is approaching the hotel on a snowmobile.

Hallorann enters the hotel. Danny tries to warn him, but Jack attacks Hallorann with his mallet and renders him unconscious. Jack corners Danny, but Danny confronts Jack with his first sung line in the opera:

"You are not my father."

Jack briefly becomes lucid again, collapses on the floor, and urges Danny to escape. Derwent, Grady, and Lloyd appear, reproach Jack, and warn him that the boiler is about to explode. Hallorann revives, and takes Wendy and Danny away from the hotel.

In the basement, Jack resolves to let his family live. He has snapped his father's cane, which Mark had used to beat his own wife, Jack's mother, years before. After his family is a safe distance away, Jack allows the boiler to explode, which destroys the hotel and kills him.

=== Epilogue ===
Eight months later, at a hotel in Maine, Wendy and Danny are guests in a cabin. On his work break, Hallorann, now a cook at this hotel, checks in on Wendy and Danny. While Danny fishes from a pond and his mother looks on, Hallorann urges the boy to be strong and continue on with his life and to help his mother, after the family's tragedy.

== Reception of premiere production ==
By February 2016, the scheduled Minnesota Opera performances had advance sales of 95%. By the time of the May 2016 performances, the entire run was sold out.

Reviews of the opera's premiere were generally favourable to all aspects of the production. The libretto and occasional incidental aspects of the music and staging received minimal criticism:

"If the evening's chief question was, can a legitimate, engrossing opera be fashioned from an unlikely source — a popular horror-thriller tale — the answer offered in this eye-filling multimedia production with its Romantic score by Paul Moravec and deft libretto by Mark Campbell, along with a first-rate cast, was a resounding yes.

"Moravec's score for the opera incorporates propulsive, percussion-driven sounds for what could be called the 'mad scenes' of Act Two, along with appropriately eerie moments as tension-builders, but most of the music is tonal and Romantic and yet doesn't sound old-fashioned — the soaring, exultant lyricism, for instance, in the opening scene as Jack and the family anticipate — almost too eagerly — their 'new life,' or at the very end, the beautifully written coda scene, where Dick Hallorann, the cook, consoles Danny and Wendy as the strings play delicate chamber music.

"From Paul Moravec 's score full of discomfiting themes that clash and collide to strongly sung and disarmingly believable portrayals of characters alive and otherwise, The Shining is an unqualified success, ranking alongside 2011's Silent Night as the best works to have been launched by Minnesota Opera's New Works Initiative."

"Paul Moravec's music sets the tone from the first moments. It's a rich, multi-layered soundscape that breathes life into the Overlook Hotel, which is both the setting and the villain of the piece.

"Mark Campbell's libretto makes the point over and over again. Wendy assures young Danny that it's not his father trying to kill him, but the hotel. In turn, Danny uses his second sight, aka the shining, to tell his mother that the hotel has got Daddy, and wants to get them too.

"If you're thinking of Jack and Wendy Torrance as Jack Nicholson and Shelly [sic] Duvall from the movie version, forget it. Brian Mulligan and Kelly Kaduce have created entirely new characters: He's stoic, introspective and determined to do the right thing, as homicidal maniacs go. And she's the picture of strength and fiercely protective maternal love — even if she does pick a stupid moment to go down to the kitchen and make sandwiches."

"Mr. Moravec's witty, evocative music strikes a good balance between the sincere and the creepy. Act I, though slowed by too much exposition, gives Jack and Wendy some heartfelt arias and duets that express their bond, while groans from the orchestra and glassy violins suggest the evil that threatens them. At first, the ghosts are just implied, but from the riotous Act I finale on, they are corporeal. In Act II, the music fragments and disintegrates, and piles on the sardonic darkness with some Kurt Weill-tinged party scenes, as Jack goes over the edge."

"This musical version of Stephen's King's novel about the remote Colorado hotel that turns a man into a homicidal maniac succeeds at nearly everything it attempts. It marries the highest of art forms with one of the most suspect in popular culture. King's story is opened up and realized in new ways, and opera actually looks fun for a change.

That's because composer Paul Moravec comprehends the situation at hand. His music is not overly serious or, as it might have been, camp, though it has elements of both. Moravec gets that most people know this story from the iconic, 1980 film starring Jack Nicholson, so he speaks the language of movie music — the shrill violin, the pulsing tempos of rising emotions, the bent note meant to warn audiences that things aren't what they seem."
