= Wendy Torrance =

- The Shining character
- Shelley Duvall as Wendy Torrance in the 1980 film The Shining
- First appearance: The Shining (1977 novel)
- Created by: Stephen King
- Adapted by: Stanley Kubrick
- Portrayed by: Shelley Duvall (1980); Rebecca De Mornay (1997); Kelly Kaduce (2016); Alex Essoe (2019)

In-universe information
- Full name: Winnifred Torrance
- Occupation: Housewife
- Family: Aileen (sister; deceased)
- Spouse: Jack Torrance
- Children: Danny Torrance

Winnifred (Note: Also spelled "Winifred" in Doctor Sleep.) "Wendy" Torrance is a fictional character of the 1977 horror novel The Shining by the American writer Stephen King. She also appears in the prologue of Doctor Sleep, a 2013 sequel to The Shining.

== Character ==
She is portrayed by Shelley Duvall in the 1980 film adaptation of the novel directed by Stanley Kubrick, by Rebecca De Mornay in the 1997 television miniseries directed by Mick Garris, and played by Alex Essoe in the 2019 film adaptation of Doctor Sleep directed by Mike Flanagan.

Unlike Jack Torrance, little of Wendy's background is revealed in the novel. A bad relationship with her emotionally abusive mother is mentioned. In the film version, the character is much less nuanced than in the book and in the miniseries (written by King himself), where she appears as a "central" character, leading to some critics to refer to the character as "two different versions of Wendy Torrance".

== List of fictional appearances ==
Books

- The Shining (1977) – written by Stephen King
- Doctor Sleep (2013) – written by Stephen King

Films

- The Shining (1980) – portrayed by Shelley Duvall
- Doctor Sleep (2019) – portrayed by Alex Essoe

Other

- The Shining (1997) – TV miniseries, portrayed by Rebecca De Mornay
- The Shining (2016) – opera, portrayed by Kelly Kaduce

== Reception ==
=== The Shining ===
==== Novel ====
The book Characters in 20th-century Literature wrote, "Wendy Torrance is a traditional wife and mother whose energies focus on the safety of her child. Although she is primarily concerned about the physical damage Jack might do to Danny, she knows that certain elements in her own upbringing may affect her performance as a mother—notably the influence of her own resentful, highly critical mother."

In American Nightmares: The Haunted House Formula in American Popular Fiction, Dale Bailey calls the novel version of the character a "modernized gothic heroine".

Writer Chelsea Quinn Yarbro has criticized Wendy's "weakness" as portrayed in the novel, attributing it to King's general inability to paint convincing female characters.

==== Film ====
In an interview with Roger Ebert, Duvall described working with Stanley Kubrick as "almost unbearable" and said that despite all of the stress she endured during the extensive shoot, her performance was overshadowed by the fame of Kubrick, stating, "After I made The Shining, all that work, hardly anyone even criticized my performance in it, even to mention it, it seemed like. The reviews were all about Kubrick, like I wasn't there..."

In A Cinema of Loneliness, Robert Phillip Kolker states, "On the generic level, Wendy is a stereotyped horror-film character, both the instigator and the object of the monster's rage. But she transcends her generic role, protects herself, and destroys the monster. Wendy assumes the "masculine" role in a wonderful symbolic gesture... Getting up to go to Jack, she moves to the rear of the frame and silently, so far back in the composition that it takes some attention to notice it, picks up a baseball bat, with which she will beat down her violent husband. The figure oppressed by the phallus steals it in order to control it. Later, when Jack attempts to smash his way into the bathroom where Wendy and Danny are hiding, she stabs his hand with a large knife, an act of displaced castration that further reduces Jack's potency and threat. The patriarch is hurt with his own weapons, diminished by an acting out on him of his own worst fear of losing his power. Wendy becomes a prototype for the "final girl" who Carol Clover recognizes as the saving figure in contemporary horror".

Stephen King has often stated that Wendy's submissiveness is one of the main reasons for his aversion to Kubrick's film, calling her "one of the most misogynistic characters ever put on film."

== See also ==
- Lists of horror film characters
- Stephen King bibliography
