= Jack Torrance =

Fictional character in The Shining

- The Shining character
- Jack Nicholson as Jack Torrance in the iconic "Here's Johnny!" scene from the 1980 film adaptation of The Shining
- First appearance: The Shining (1977 novel)
- Created by: Stephen King
- Portrayed by: Jack Nicholson (1980); Steven Weber (1997); Brian Mulligan (2016); Henry Thomas (2019)

In-universe information
- Full name: John Daniel Edward Torrance
- Family: Mark Torrance (father; deceased); Brett Torrance (brother; deceased); Becky Torrance (sister); Mike Torrance (brother)
- Spouses: Wendy Torrance (wife; deceased); Alessandra “Sandy” Reynolds (ex-lover; deceased)
- Children: Danny Torrance (son); Lucy Stone (née Reynolds; illegitimate daughter)
- Relatives: Abra Stone (granddaughter); Dave Stone (son-in-law); Jackie Torrance (niece)

John Daniel Edward "Jack" Torrance is a fictional character and the main protagonist of Stephen King's horror novel The Shining (1977). He was portrayed by Jack Nicholson in the novel's 1980 film adaptation, by Steven Weber in the 1997 miniseries, and by Henry Thomas in the 2019 film adaptation of Doctor Sleep. The American Film Institute rated the character (as played by Nicholson) the 25th-greatest film villain of all time. In 2008, Jack Torrance was selected by Empire magazine as one of the 100 greatest movie characters. Premiere magazine also ranked Torrance on their list of their 100 greatest movie characters of all time.

== Fictional biography ==
Jack grew up in Berlin, New Hampshire, where his father, Mark Torrance, worked in the Regional Community Hospital. The youngest of four children, he had three older siblings: Brett, Becky, and Mike. He is a writer, former teacher, and debate team coach. His alcoholism and volatile temper costs him his teaching position at Stovington Preparatory School after he assaults George Hatfield, a student and former member of the debate team, whom he catches vandalizing his car.

Later, Jack's drinking nearly ends his marriage to his wife, Wendy, after he breaks his son Danny's arm in a blind rage. He finally decides to quit drinking after a drunk driving crash in which he and a friend run over an abandoned bicycle in the road and realize they could have killed a child.

Jack accepts a position maintaining the isolated Overlook Hotel in Colorado for the winter, hoping this will salvage his family, re-establish his career, and give him the time and privacy to finish a promising play. He moves to the hotel with Wendy and Danny, who is telepathic and sensitive to supernatural forces. Danny receives guidance from an imaginary friend he calls "Tony." Danny is also comforted by meeting the hotel's kindly cook, Dick Hallorann, who shares Danny's telepathic abilities.

It is later revealed that Jack's father, also an alcoholic, was abusive towards his family. A flashback scene in the novel shows his drunk father brutally bashing Jack's mother with a cane.

The Hotel is haunted by the ghosts of those who died violently within it and is itself host to a being of unknown origin, who wishes to coerce Jack into killing Danny. Apparently, the Hotel believes if it can harness the boy's "shining", then it can gather enough power to "break free" of the building in which it has somehow become trapped. Jack has encounters with ghosts of previous staff of the hotel, who insist he has always been working there and he must kill his family. Jack eventually succumbs to these supernatural forces, starts drinking again, and grows to hate his own wife and child.

Jack cuts off all radio communications and sabotages the hotel snowmobile, their only means of transportation. He then tries to kill Wendy, who knocks him out and locks him in a food storage room. Jack is later helped out of the storage room by the ghost of the previous caretaker, who murdered his own family before committing suicide.

Jack then brutally attacks Wendy with a roque mallet he found, although she escapes. He is interrupted by the arrival of Hallorann, whom he almost beats to death.

Jack finds and confronts Danny, and is about to kill him when his son reaches through the hotel's power and brings out his father's true self. Jack tells Danny to run and remember how much he loves him, before the hotel's power takes over again and forces Jack to bash in his own face with the mallet. Jack had forgotten to dump the boiler, which grows too hot and causes the hotel to explode. Jack is killed, but Danny, Wendy and Hallorann get out just in time.

In the sequel novel Doctor Sleep (2013), Danny (now going by Dan) learns that Jack is also the biological father of Lucy Stone, a woman whose daughter Abra has manifested “shining” abilities even stronger than Dan's. Shortly before he was fired from his teaching position, and unbeknownst to Wendy, Jack had a brief sexual encounter with a student teacher Sandy Reynolds at a party that led to Lucy's conception. Dan is thus Lucy's half-brother and Abra's half-uncle. This book gives Jack's middle name as Edward rather than Daniel.

In the climax of the novel, Jack's ghost intervenes to help Dan's friend Billy Freeman, and Lucy and Abra Stone defeat the main antagonists, Rose the Hat and the True Knot, at the site where the Overlook once stood. After the battle, Jack and Dan make peace with each other before he, Billy, and Abra leave the location.

== In other media ==
=== In film ===
Jack Torrance (played by Jack Nicholson) is portrayed in a less sympathetic manner in the 1980 film; his backstory as a teacher is almost entirely absent, and his reasons for leaving the profession are not addressed. In the novel, his discovery of the Overlook's past and his increasing obsession with it, to the neglect of his original play, fuel the Overlook's gradual possession of him; in the film, his mental deterioration is presented as largely due to isolation, writer's block, and a preexisting antagonism towards Wendy and Danny. Finally, while Jack also dies at the end of the film, his fate is left more ambiguous than in the novel: the final shot reveals a photograph in the Overlook of the July 4 ball in 1921 that shows Jack at the event, suggesting his spirit has, indeed, always been at the Overlook.

In the 2019 film adaptation of Doctor Sleep, Torrance's likeness (Henry Thomas) is taken by The Bartender at the Overlook for an interaction with the adult Danny (Ewan McGregor), which is expanded in the director's cut to include a following scene in the bathroom, where Torrance's likeness is also taken by the Hotel Caretaker. Thomas also portrays Torrance in flashback sequences.

=== In miniseries ===
Author Stephen King was unhappy with director Stanley Kubrick's 1980 film adaptation of the novel, particularly Nicholson's portrayal of Jack Torrance:

The character of Jack Torrance has no arc in that movie. Absolutely no arc at all. When we first see Jack Nicholson, he's in the office of Mr. Ullman, the manager of the hotel, and you know, then, he's crazy as a shit house rat. All he does is get crazier. In the book, he's a guy who's struggling with his sanity and finally loses it. To me, that's a tragedy. In the movie, there's no tragedy because there's no real change.

King then decided to create a miniseries based on his vision of the novel, with Jack Torrance as a more sympathetic character. Torrance in the miniseries is similar to the character in the novel, but the ending is changed. In the book, Jack redeems himself, and the boiler explodes due to the hotel's negligence. In the miniseries, Jack sacrifices himself by causing the boiler to explode in order to destroy the hotel.

The miniseries ends with a scene not in the book: Danny graduates from high school, while his spectral father looks on.

=== In opera ===
An opera based on Stephen King's 1977 novel originated with Eric Simonson, who directed the premiere production of the opera, and Minnesota Opera Artistic Director Dale Johnson. Paul Moravec and Mark Campbell planned to design their opera to adhere to King's novel, unlike the 1980 film adaptation. Jack and the other characters were portrayed similarly like in the novel, and it was approved of by King. Jack is portrayed by Brian Mulligan.

=== In play ===
In 2017, reports began of a new play directed by Ivo van Hove and written by Simon Stephens based on the 1977 book, set to premiere in 2023 in the West End, with Ben Stiller reportedly in talks to play Jack Torrance. As of 2025, no casting has been confirmed.
