= Kelly Kaduce =

American soprano (born 1974)

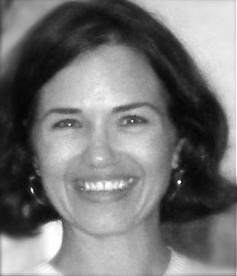
- Kaduce in 2008

Kelly Kaduce (born 1974) is an American soprano. She was born in Winnebago, Minnesota, United States of America. A graduate of St. Olaf College and Boston University (where she studied under Penelope Bitzas), Kaduce won the 1999 Metropolitan Opera National Council Auditions.

== Career ==
Since her debut in 2000, she has appeared in national and international opera houses (e.g., New York City Opera, Boston Lyric Opera, Opera Theater of St. Louis).

Kaduce sang the title role of Anna Karenina in the world premiere of the David Carlson opera in 2007 (Florida Grand Opera and Opera Theater of St. Louis), directed by Colin Graham. She also starred in the world premiere production of Ian Gordon's The Grapes of Wrath (Minnesota Opera), Bright Sheng's Madame Mao (Santa Fe Opera debut in 2003), and the American premieres of Tan Dun's Tea: A Mirror of Soul (Santa Fe Opera) and Michael Berkeley's Jane Eyre (Opera Theater of St. Louis). She created the role of Caroline Gaines in Richard Danielpour's Margaret Garner in Detroit. Kaduce has also appeared as Mimi in Baz Luhrmann's Broadway La Boheme in Los Angeles. She opened the Santa Fe Opera 2010 season as Madama Butterfly.

== Repertoire ==
Kaduce's repertoire includes Donna Anna and Donna Elvira (Mozart's Don Giovanni), Violetta (Verdi's La Traviata), Mimi and Musetta (Puccini's La Boheme), Nedda (I Pagliacci), Wendy Torrance (The Shining), Juliette (Gounod's Romeo et Juliette), the title roles in Suor Angelica, Rusalka, Susannah, Jenufa, Thais, and Richard Strauss's Salome. Her concert repertoire includes Samuel Barber's Prayers of Kierkegaard, Alban Berg'sSeven Early Songs, Richard Strauss's Vier letzte Lieder, and Benjamin Britten's War Requiem.

== Family life ==
Kaduce is married to baritone Lee Gregory.

== Discography ==
- Carlson, Anna Karenina, Robertson.
- Gordon, The Grapes of Wrath, Minnesota Opera.
