= The Shining (novel) =

1977 novel by Stephen King

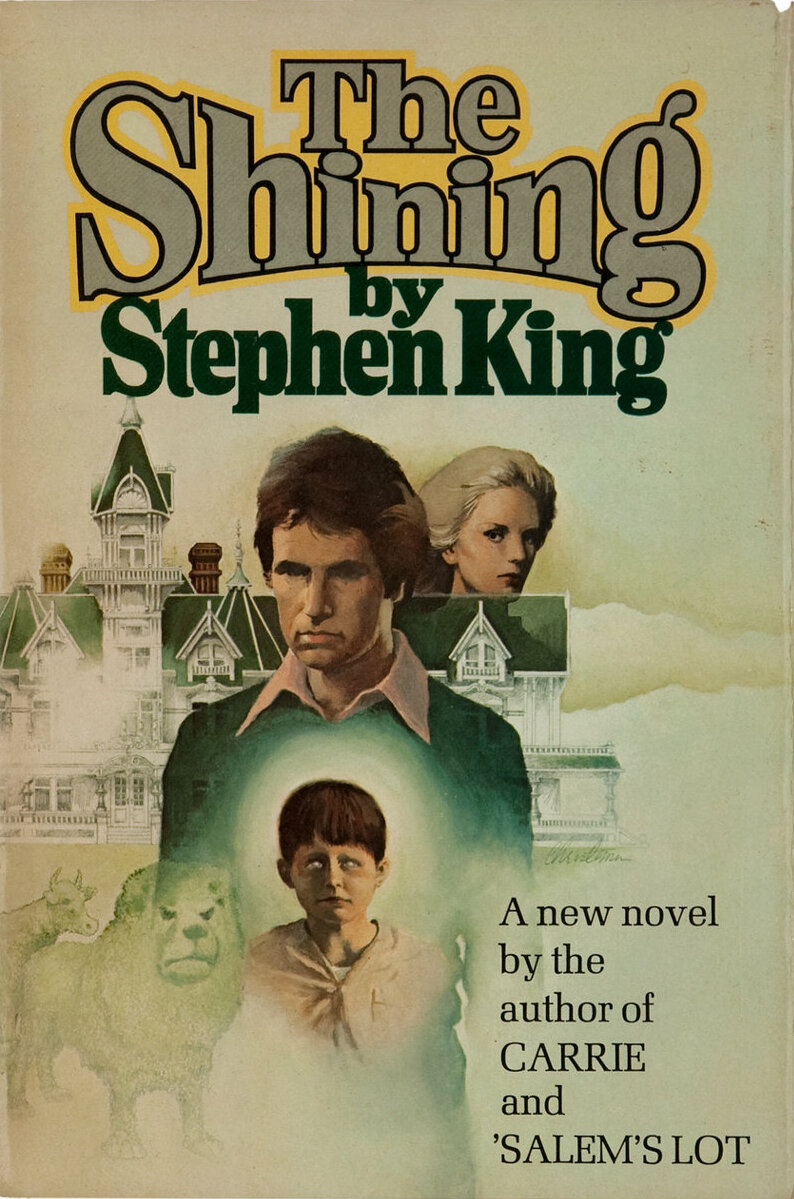
- First edition cover
- Author: Stephen King
- Cover artist: Dave Christensen
- Language: English
- Genre: Gothic novel; Horror; Psychological horror
- Publisher: Doubleday
- Publication date: January 28, 1977
- Publication place: United States
- Media type: Print (hardcover)
- Pages: 447
- ISBN: 978-0-385-12167-5
- LC Class: no2016154517
- Followed by: Doctor Sleep

The Shining is a 1977 horror novel by American author Stephen King. It is King's third published novel and first hardcover bestseller; its success firmly established King as a preeminent author in the horror genre. The setting and characters are influenced by King's personal experiences, including his visit to The Stanley Hotel in 1974 and his struggle with alcoholism. The novel was adapted into a 1980 film and a 1997 miniseries. The book was followed by a sequel, Doctor Sleep, published in 2013, which in turn was adapted into a 2019 film.

The Shining centers on Jack Torrance, a struggling writer and recovering alcoholic who accepts a position as the off-season caretaker of the historic Overlook Hotel in the Colorado Rockies. His family accompanies him on this job, including his young son, Danny, who possesses "the shining", an array of psychic abilities that allow the child to glimpse the hotel's horrific true nature. Soon, after a winter storm leaves the family snowbound, the supernatural forces inhabiting the hotel influence Jack's sanity, leaving his wife Wendy and son in grave danger.

== Plot ==
Jack Torrance, an aspiring writer, is hired as the winter caretaker at the Overlook Hotel, an isolated resort hotel in the Colorado Rockies. Jack is a recovering alcoholic with anger issues, which previously caused him to accidentally break his son Danny's arm and lose a teaching job after assaulting a student. Jack hopes that the hotel's seclusion will help him reconnect with Danny and his wife, Wendy, and give him the motivation needed to complete his unfinished manuscript.

Unknown to his parents, Danny possesses psychic abilities known as "shining", which include reading minds, premonitions, and clairvoyance. While moving into the hotel on closing day, the Torrances meet the chef, Dick Hallorann, who possesses similar abilities to Danny's, and forms a connection with him.

As the Torrances settle in alone at the Overlook, Danny sees ghosts and frightening visions. Danny does not tell either of his parents about his visions because he senses that the caretaking job is important to his father, and he dissuades Wendy from leaving Jack at the Overlook by himself. However, Danny soon realizes that his presence at the hotel amplifies the supernatural activity, turning echoes of past tragedies into dangerous threats. Apparitions take solid form, and the garden's topiary animals come to life. The winter snowfall leaves the Torrances cut off from the outside world.

The Overlook has difficulty possessing Danny, so it turns its attention to Jack by frustrating his desire to work and enticing him with the hotel's dark history through a scrapbook in the basement. Jack begins to develop cabin fever and grows increasingly unstable, destroying a two-way radio and sabotaging a snowmobile. After a fight with Wendy, Jack sees the hotel's bar fully stocked with liquor despite being previously empty and finds himself attending a party of ghosts. As he gets drunk, the hotel uses the ghost of Delbert Grady, a previous caretaker who murdered his family, to urge Jack to do the same to Danny and Wendy. He initially resists but ultimately succumbs to his dark side and the hotel.

Wendy and Danny get the better of Jack after he attacks Wendy, locking him inside the pantry, but Grady's ghost releases him after he makes Jack promise to bring him Danny and kill Wendy. Jack attacks Wendy with one of the hotel's roque mallets, seriously injuring her, but she escapes to the caretaker's suite and locks herself in the bathroom. Jack attempts to break the door with the mallet, but Wendy slashes his hand with a razor blade to deter him. Meanwhile, Hallorann, having received a psychic distress call from Danny while working at a winter resort in Florida, rushes back to the Overlook, only to be attacked by the topiary animals and severely injured by Jack.

As Jack pursues Danny through the hotel and corners him on the top floor, he briefly gains control of himself and implores Danny to flee. The hotel retakes control of Jack, making him violently batter his own face and skull into ruin with the mallet, leaving his body under the hotel's control. Remembering that Jack has neglected to relieve the pressure on the hotel's unstable boiler, Danny informs the hotel that it is about to explode. As Danny, Wendy, and Hallorann flee, the hotel-creature rushes to the basement in an attempt to vent the pressure, but it is too late. The boiler explodes, killing Jack and destroying the Overlook. Fighting off a last attempt by the hotel to possess him, Hallorann guides Danny and Wendy to safety.

The book's epilogue is set during the next summer. Hallorann, who has taken a chef's job at a resort in Maine, comforts Danny over the loss of his father as Wendy recuperates from the injuries Jack inflicted on her.

== Background ==
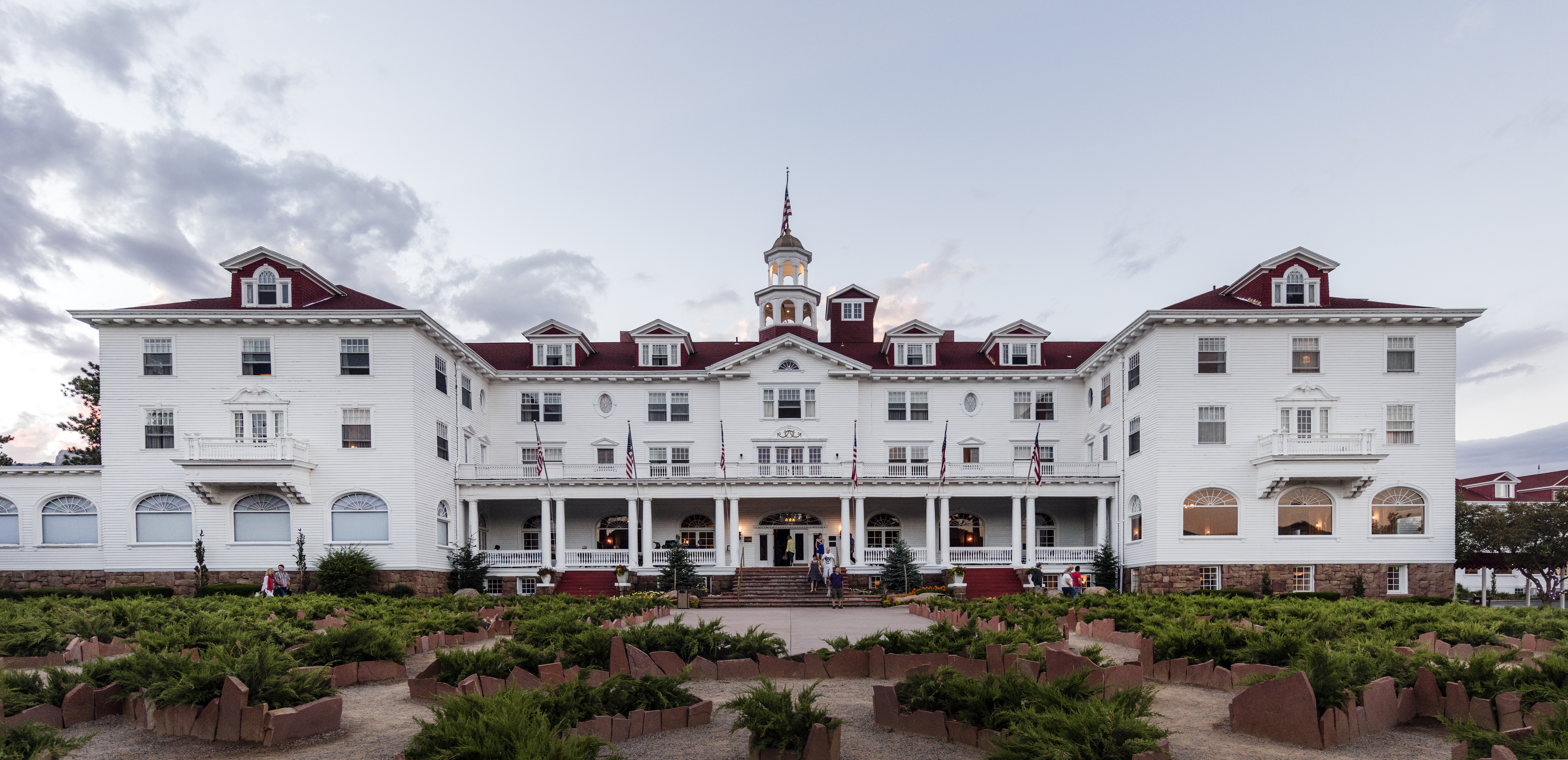
The Stanley Hotel, which hosted King in 1974, served as the inspiration for the Overlook Hotel.

After writing Carrie and 'Salem's Lot, which are both set in small towns in King's native Maine, King was looking for a change of pace for his next book: "I wanted to spend a year away from Maine so that my next novel would have a different sort of background". King opened an atlas of the United States on his kitchen table and randomly pointed to a location, which turned out to be Boulder, Colorado.

On October 30, 1974, King and his wife Tabitha checked into The Stanley Hotel in nearby Estes Park, Colorado. They were the only two guests in the hotel that night: "When we arrived, they were just getting ready to close for the season, and we found ourselves the only guests in the place — with all those long, empty corridors".

Ten years earlier, King had read Ray Bradbury's 1950 short story "The Veldt" and was inspired to write a story about a person whose dreams would become real. In 1972, King started a novel entitled Darkshine, which was to be about a psychic boy in a psychic amusement park; the idea never came to fruition and he abandoned the book. During the night at the Stanley, this story came back to him.

King and his wife had dinner that evening in the grand dining room, totally alone. They were offered one choice for dinner, the only meal still available. Taped orchestral music played in the room and theirs was the only table set for dining: "Except for our table all the chairs were up on the tables. So the music is echoing down the hall, and, I mean, it was like God had put me there to hear that and see those things. And by the time I went to bed that night, I had the whole book in my mind". After dinner, his wife decided to turn in, but King took a walk around the empty hotel. He ended up in the bar and was served drinks by a bartender named Grady.

In King's words: "That night I dreamed of my three-year-old son running through the corridors, looking back over his shoulder, eyes wide, screaming. He was being chased by a fire-hose. I woke up with a tremendous jerk, sweating all over, within an inch of falling out of bed. I got up, lit a cigarette, sat in a chair looking out the window at the Rockies, and by the time the cigarette was done, I had the bones of the book firmly set in my mind".

Sometimes you confess. You always hide what you're confessing to. That's one of the reasons why you make up the story. When I wrote The Shining, for instance, the protagonist of The Shining is a man who has broken his son's arm, who has a history of child beating, who is beaten himself. And as a young father with two children, I was horrified by my occasional feelings of real antagonism toward my children. Won't you ever stop? Won't you ever go to bed? And time has given me the idea that probably there are a lot of young fathers and young mothers both who feel very angry, who have angry feelings toward their children. But as somebody who has been raised with the idea that father knows best and Ward Cleaver on Leave It to Beaver, and all this stuff, I would think to myself, Oh, if he doesn't shut up, if he doesn't shut up... So when I wrote this book I wrote a lot of that down and tried to get it out of my system, but it was also a confession. Yes, there are times when I felt very angry toward my children and have even felt as though I could hurt them. Well, my kids are older now. Naomi is fifteen and Joey is thirteen and Owen is eight, and they're all super kids, and I don't think I've laid a hand on one of my kids in probably seven years, but there was a time...

The Shining was also heavily influenced by Shirley Jackson's 1959 novel The Haunting of Hill House, Edgar Allan Poe's short stories "The Fall of the House of Usher" (1839) and "The Masque of the Red Death" (1842), and Robert Marasco's 1973 novel Burnt Offerings. The story has often been compared to Guy de Maupassant's story "The Inn".

Before writing The Shining, King had written the novel Roadwork and the novella The Body. The first draft of The Shining took less than four months to complete and he was able to publish it before the others. The title was inspired by the 1970 John Lennon song "Instant Karma!", which contained the line "We all shine on". Bill Thompson, King's editor at Doubleday Publishing, tried to talk him out of The Shining because he thought that after writing Carrie and 'Salem's Lot he would get "typed" as a horror writer. King considered that a compliment.

== Deleted prologue and epilogue ==
The Shining originally included a prologue titled "Before the Play" that chronicled earlier events in the Overlook's history, as well as an epilogue titled "After the Play". Neither remained part of the published novel. The prologue was later published in Whispers magazine in August 1982, and an abridged version appeared in the April 26–May 2, 1997 issue of TV Guide to promote the then-upcoming miniseries of The Shining. The epilogue was thought to have been lost but was re-discovered in 2016 as part of an early manuscript version of the novel. Both "Before the Play" and "After the Play" were published as part of the Deluxe Special Edition of The Shining by Cemetery Dance Publications in early 2017.

== Sequel ==
In November 2009, during a reading at the Canon Theatre in Toronto, King described to the audience an idea for a sequel to The Shining. The idea was prompted by the occasional person asking, "Whatever happened to Danny?" The story would follow Danny Torrance, now in his 40s, living in New Hampshire, where he works as an orderly at a hospice, using his powers to support terminally ill patients at their death. Later, on December 1, King posted a poll on his official website, asking visitors to vote for which book he should write next, Doctor Sleep or the next Dark Tower novel:

I mentioned two potential projects while I was on the road, one a new Mid-World book (not directly about Roland Deschain, but yes, he and his friend Cuthbert are in it, hunting a skin-man, which are what werewolves are called in that lost kingdom) and a sequel to The Shining called Doctor Sleep. Are you interested in reading either of these? If so, which one turns your dials more? [We] will be counting your votes (and of course it all means nothing if the muse doesn't speak).

Voting ended on December 31, and it was revealed that Doctor Sleep received 5,861 votes, while The Wind Through the Keyhole received 5,812. In Doctor Sleep, published in September 2013, the plot includes a traveling group of psychic vampires called the True Knot.

== Adaptations ==
The novel was adapted into a 1980 feature film of the same name directed by Stanley Kubrick and co-written with Diane Johnson. King himself wrote a screenplay, which was initially very faithful to the novel but rejected by Kubrick. Although King himself remains disappointed with the adaptation, having criticized its handling of the book's major themes and of Wendy's character, it is regarded as one of the greatest horror films ever made. King's disdain of the film has not lessened in recent years, with his 2018 novel The Outsider even including a jab about how poorly done Kubrick's interpretation of the film is. The film adaptation of Doctor Sleep, released in 2019, was written and directed by Mike Flanagan and served as a direct sequel to the Kubrick film, but it also heavily utilizes and adapts elements of The Shining novel, including Jack's original story being incorporated into the adult Danny's arc, the effects of alcoholism, and the story's conclusion being used for the film's climax, which ultimately led to it earning King's approval.

The novel was also later adapted into a television miniseries, which premiered in 1997 on ABC. King wrote and closely monitored the making of the series to ensure that it followed the novel's narrative. The miniseries garnered popular and critical acclaim, but in recent years has been received less fondly by critics compared to Kubrick's film. The novel was adapted into an opera of the same name in 2016. It is also being adapted into a stage play directed by Ivo van Hove and written by Simon Stephens. Ben Stiller is reportedly in talks to play Jack Torrance in a stage adaptation. A spin-off series titled Overlook is in development by J. J. Abrams and his production company Bad Robot. It was to air on HBO Max and explore the tales of the Overlook Hotel. However, by August 2021, the show did not move forward at HBO Max and was shopped to other outlets before Netflix picked it up the following year.

== See also ==
- Haunted house
- "1408" – Stephen King's 1999 short story about the haunted hotel room
