= Danny Torrance =

Fictional character in The Shining and Doctor Sleep

- The Shining character
- Danny Lloyd as Danny Torrance in 1980 film The Shining
- First appearance: The Shining (1977 novel)
- Last appearance: Doctor Sleep (2019 film)
- Created by: Stephen King
- Portrayed by: Danny Lloyd (1980); Courtland Mead (1997); Wil Horneff (1997); Alejandro Vega (2016); Ewan McGregor (2019); Roger Dale Floyd (2019)
- Abilities: Psychic powers

In-universe information
- Full name: Daniel Anthony Torrance
- Alias: Doctor Sleep
- Family: Jack Torrance (father); Wendy Torrance (mother)

Daniel Anthony "Danny" Torrance is a fictional character who first appears in the 1977 novel The Shining by Stephen King as a child with psychic powers called "the shining". His parents are father Jack Torrance and mother Wendy Torrance. The character was portrayed by Danny Lloyd in the 1980 film adaptation The Shining and by Courtland Mead in the 1997 television miniseries The Shining.

In 2013, Stephen King released the novel Doctor Sleep, a sequel to the 1977 novel that features an adult Dan Torrance as the protagonist. In 2019, Warner Bros. Pictures released the film Doctor Sleep with actor Ewan McGregor playing the adult Dan Torrance.

== Fictional history ==
=== The Shining ===
Danny Torrance is introduced in The Shining as the five-year-old son of Jack and Wendy Torrance. He has psychic powers that fellow psychic Dick Hallorann calls "shining" – he can read people's thoughts, communicate telepathically with others who "shine", and has frequent, frightening prophetic visions. He receives these messages and visions from a supernatural entity he calls "Tony" that only he can see; his parents believe that "Tony" is merely his imaginary friend.

Danny has a difficult relationship with Jack, an alcoholic prone to fits of violent anger. During one such drunken rage, Jack snaps the boy's arm. Horrified, Jack quits drinking and tries to be a better parent, hoping to mend their relationship during the five months they are to be living at the Overlook Hotel as caretakers. As Jack falls under the Overlook's control, however, he grows increasingly unstable, and Danny comes to fear him.

At the Overlook, Danny meets head cook Dick Hallorann, who also "shines". The two sense their connection instantly, and Hallorann tells Danny to reach out to him with his "shine" if he needs help.

While living at the Overlook, Danny experiences terrifying visions of the various evil spirits that inhabit the place, including a desiccated old woman who tries to choke him. He also experiences visions of the word "redrum" – "murder" spelled backwards.

When the Overlook possesses Jack completely, Danny calls for Dick Hallorann's help and a possessed Jack attacks Danny and Wendy (and later Dick Hallorann, having come to Danny's aid) with a roque mallet, severely injuring both adults but failing to harm Danny. Jack tries to kill Danny, but his love for his son breaks through long enough that Jack allows him to escape. Moments later, Jack causes the hotel's boiler to explode, destroying the hotel and himself. His spirit remains with Danny, however, and the boy sees a brief vision of his father years later as he graduates from high school.

=== Doctor Sleep ===
Ewan McGregor as Dan Torrance in a scene of Doctor Sleep (2019)

Thirty years later, Danny (now going by "Dan") is still haunted by the events at the Overlook and tormented by his visions, and as such has become an alcoholic, just like his father. He drifts through the U.S. until he settles in Frazier, New Hampshire, where he quits drinking and joins Alcoholics Anonymous with the help of his friend and fellow alcoholic Billy Freeman. He gets a job tending to a miniature replica of the town and a small train running around it before eventually finding employment at a local hospice, where he uses his "shine" to comfort dying patients as they pass on.

He begins receiving messages from Abra Stone, a young girl with a "shine" of her own, who tells him of a group of psychic vampires called The True Knot, who are killing children who "shine" and absorbing their power. When the True Knot targets Abra, she telepathically asks Dan for help.

Dan travels to Abra's home and convinces her family of the danger she faces after defeating members of the True Knot who try to kidnap her. After talking with Abra's great-grandmother, Concetta Reynolds, he learns that Lucy, Abra's mother, was in fact Jack Torrance's illegitimate child, making him Abra's uncle and Lucy's half-brother, which he reveals to the family. He and Abra telepathically bait the True Knot's leader, Rose the Hat, into following them to the former site of the Overlook. He engages Rose in a brutal battle, aided by Jack Torrance's ghost; together, they push her off an observation platform to her death. Before leaving, Dan sees Jack's ghost wave goodbye and disappear, finally at peace.

The novel ends with Dan celebrating 15 years of sobriety, having become close with Abra and her family as he attends her 15th birthday party. Dan tells Abra about his family's history of alcoholism and rage, warning her to avoid the same issues. Dan advises Abra on how to handle her "shine" whenever she feels upset, before returning to the hospice to comfort a patient.

== List of fictional appearances ==
Novels

- The Shining (1977) – written by Stephen King
- Doctor Sleep (2013) – written by Stephen King

Films

- The Shining (1980) – portrayed by Danny Lloyd
- Doctor Sleep (2019) – portrayed by Ewan McGregor (adult); Roger Dale Floyd (young)

Other

- The Shining (1997) – miniseries, portrayed by Courtland Mead (child); Wil Horneff (older)
- The Shining (2016) – opera, portrayed by Alejandro Vega

== Characterization ==
=== The Shining ===
Danny Torrance in The Shining is one of several child characters in Stephen King's early fiction who deal with parental abandonment or the fear of it; other characters include Carrie White in Carrie and Charlene "Charlie" McGee in Firestarter. Heidi Strengell, in Dissecting Stephen King, says, "In King's view children, like Danny Torrance, are able to deal with fantasy and terror on their own terms better than adults because of the size of their imaginative capacity and their unique position in life." The reference guide Characters in 20th-Century Literature wrote, "Some critics complain that Danny displays an improbable maturity for a child his age." Author Dale Bailey, writing about haunted houses, said King's writing of Danny, a psychic in a haunted setting, borrowed the link made by Shirley Jackson and Richard Matheson in their works. Bailey perceives Danny as having ambivalence toward his father; he loves Jack, but through his "shining" he can see how emotionally disturbed his father is. King said there was evidence of parallels between Danny and his father, "Danny, like Jack himself, may someday fall into behavioral patterns of the father he both loves and fears."

In the novel The Shining, Danny shares his power of "the shining" with several strangers, where in the film adaptation, he is secretive about it, even when confiding in fellow psychic Dick Hallorann. In the novel, Danny has an extraordinary intelligence, a large vocabulary, is attached to his father and is able to foresee all of Hotel Overlook's horrors. In contrast, in the film, he is portrayed as an ordinary boy with only the extraordinary power and has visions that change with events that happen at the hotel. Academic Greg Jenkins says the primary reason for Danny being less talkative was the difficulty for a child actor to memorize lines, but he said the minimal dialogue also created more suspense.

Danny has an "imaginary friend" named Tony that warns him of danger and has been portrayed in different ways. The Dissolve said King's novel suggests Tony as "a part of Danny, a piece of future adult potential made manifest". In Kubrick's film, Tony is only shown as imaginary, "his own crooked finger in an eerie, croaking voice". The TV miniseries, also by King, has Tony as a "glowing, flying, transparent teenager", later revealed to be a future version of himself. Bailey said of the incarnation of Tony in the original novel was "a projection of Danny's mind, giving voice to anxieties which otherwise transcend his understanding", citing as evidence the interlinking of the male Torrances' names: grandfather Mark Anthony Torrance, John Daniel "Jack" Torrance, and Daniel Anthony Torrance.

=== Doctor Sleep ===
Stephen King said he had been asked what happened to Danny Torrance after the events of The Shining, and he decided to write its sequel Doctor Sleep, which portrays Danny as an adult. In the novel, the adult Dan Torrance is depicted as an alcoholic drifter who is haunted by the memory of his father. The Guardian said of the portrayal of Dan, "It... captures the reality of a recovering alcoholic, a state with which King is intimately familiar." King said he wanted to depict Dan as avoiding being like his parents and trying to escape his roots.

In the film adaptation, Dan seemingly sacrifices his own life to save Abra by destroying the Overlook, depicted as condemned but still standing; this is a nod to the ending of King's novel The Shining.
