= Kyliegh Curran =

American actress (born 2005)

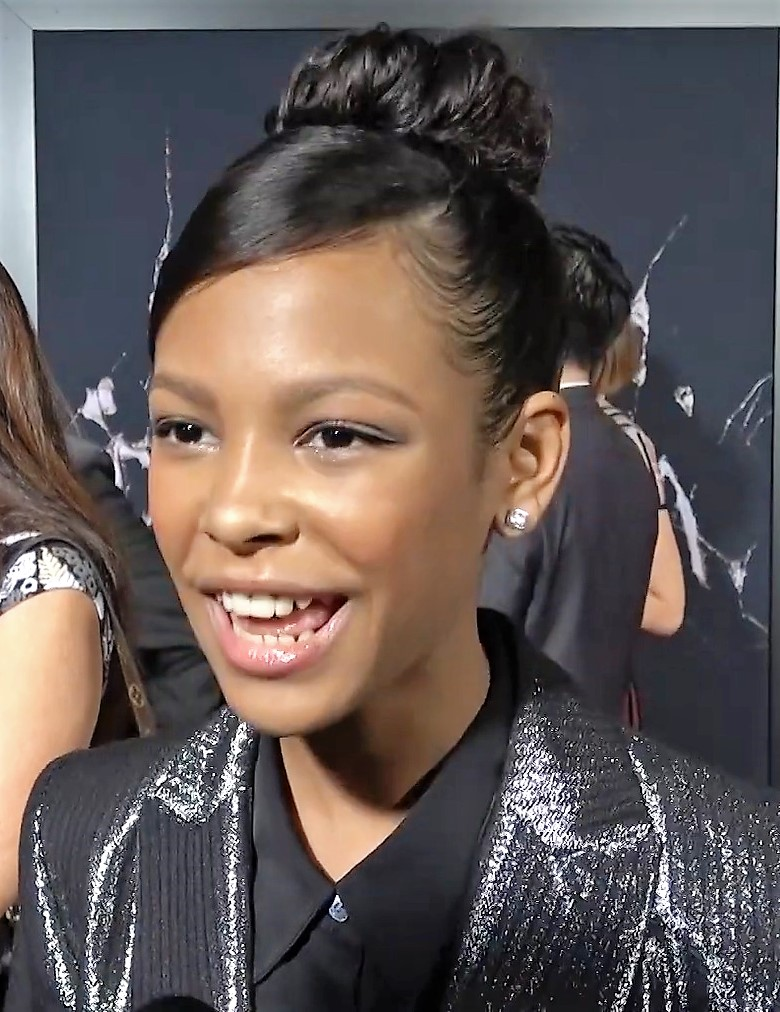
- Curran in 2019
- Born: December 10, 2005 (age 20); Miami, Florida, United States
- Occupation: Actress
- Years active: 2015–present

Kyliegh Curran (born December 10, 2005) is an American actress. She starred in the horror film Doctor Sleep and played Harper on the Disney Channel mystery series Secrets of Sulphur Springs. She previously played young Nala in a Broadway production of The Lion King.

== Early life and education ==
Curran was born in Miami, Florida on December 10, 2005. Her maternal grandfather is the Bahamian-American writer and scholar Whittington B. Johnson.

She started taking acting classes at seven years old. She moved to New York City for her career. Through first and second grades, Curran practiced theater at an Actors' Playhouse conservatory close to the Broadway theatre area. Curran, not finding film-related opportunities in Miami and New York, started attending the British Academy of Performing Arts in Marietta, Georgia and the Renaissance International School of Performing Arts in Milton, Georgia. As part of growing up with an acting career, she is homeschooled.

== Career ==
Curran's first show was Madeline's Christmas in Coral Gables, Florida. When she was 10 years old, she was cast as Young Nala in Julie Taymor's Broadway production of The Lion King. In 2015, she was cast in her first film role in the independent film I Can I Will I Did, which was released in 2017. While living in Georgia, she auditioned for the Stephen King-based horror film Doctor Sleep and was cast in a leading role opposite Ewan McGregor playing Abra, a girl with psychic powers. Following Doctor Sleep, she began work on the Disney Channel series Secrets of Sulphur Springs playing Harper.

== Personal life ==
Living in Atlanta, Curran works with the organizations Girls, Inc. and Reach Out and Read Georgia. She is also involved with environmental issues.

== Credits ==
Curran's acting credits
Year	Title	Medium	Role	Notes	Ref.
2015	The Lion King	Stage	Young Nala	Broadway production by Julie Taymor	
2017	I Can I Will I Did	Feature film	Lily		
2019	Doctor Sleep	Feature film	Abra Stone	Won – 46th Saturn Award for Best Performance by a Younger Actor	
2021–2023	Secrets of Sulphur Springs	Television	Harper	Produced by Disney Channel	
2023	The Fall of the House of Usher	Television	Lenore Usher		
2025	Win or Lose	Television	Taylor	Voice acting	
