= Doctor Sleep (2019 film) =

American film by Mike Flanagan

- Theatrical release poster
- Directed by: Mike Flanagan
- Screenplay by: Mike Flanagan
- Based on: Doctor Sleep by Stephen King
- Produced by: Trevor Macy; Jon Berg
- Starring: Ewan McGregor; Rebecca Ferguson; Kyliegh Curran; Cliff Curtis
- Cinematography: Michael Fimognari
- Edited by: Mike Flanagan
- Music by: The Newton Brothers
- Production companies: Warner Bros. Pictures; Intrepid Pictures; Vertigo Entertainment
- Distributed by: Warner Bros. Pictures
- Release dates: October 21, 2019 (Regency Village Theater); November 8, 2019 (United States)
- Running time: 152 minutes; 180 minutes (Director's Cut)
- Country: United States
- Language: English
- Budget: $45–55 million
- Box office: $72.4 million

Doctor Sleep is a 2019 American supernatural horror film written, directed, and edited by Mike Flanagan. It is a film adaptation of the 2013 novel by Stephen King and serves as a sequel to The Shining (1980). The film stars Ewan McGregor as Dan Torrance, a man with psychic abilities and a drinking problem, who struggles with childhood trauma caused by the horrors at the Overlook Hotel. Rebecca Ferguson, Kyliegh Curran, and Cliff Curtis have supporting roles as new characters: Abra Stone and Billy Freeman team up with Dan to take down Rose the Hat and her gang of followers.

Warner Bros. Pictures began developing a film adaptation shortly after Doctor Sleep was published in 2013. Writer-producer Akiva Goldsman wrote a script, but the studio did not secure a budget for the film until the box office success of its 2017 horror film It, also based on a novel by King. Flanagan was hired to rewrite Goldsman's script and direct the Doctor Sleep film. Flanagan said he wanted to reconcile the differences between The Shining novel and film. Filming began in September 2018 in Georgia, including Atlanta and the surrounding area, and concluded that December.

Doctor Sleep held its world premiere at the Regency Village Theater in Los Angeles on October 21, 2019, and was theatrically released worldwide on October 31, 2019, and in the United States on November 8. The film received generally positive reviews from critics, who praised Flanagan's direction and screenplay, and the performances of the cast (especially McGregor, Ferguson, and Curran) but criticized its runtime. Grossing $72.4 million worldwide, its performance at the box office was a disappointment compared to the other King adaptations released in 2019: It Chapter Two and Pet Sematary.

== Plot ==
After his family's ordeal at the Overlook Hotel, the traumatized Danny Torrance is followed by its ghostly inhabitants seeking his "shine". When Danny is 8 and after an incident with the ghost lady in his bathroom, Dick Hallorann teaches him how to capture them in psychic "lockboxes". In 2011, Dan has become an alcoholic to suppress his abilities. After moving to New Hampshire, Dan recovers through Alcoholics Anonymous. Working as a hospice orderly, Dan uses the shining to comfort dying patients, earning the nickname "Doctor Sleep". A young girl named Abra Stone, whose shine is even greater than Dan's, telepathically reaches out to him, and the two form a psychic friendship.

A separate plotline follows the True Knot, an old cult of psychic vampires led by Rose the Hat. They feed on "steam", a psychic essence released by torturing and killing people who possess the shining. By 2019, as the number of potential prey dwindles, the group has begun starving. They recruit teenage Andi, who has the power of suggestion, but their gruesome killing of a young baseball player traumatizes Abra, who alerts Dan. Rose, who senses Abra's clairvoyance, and later becomes connected to her while shopping, becomes intrigued. Rose infiltrates Abra's dream but is trapped by Abra, who proceeds to rummage through Rose's memory to learn about the cult. Convinced that Abra's immense powers will supply them with steam for years to come, Rose sends the True Knot members after her.

Abra divines the crime scene's location and meets Dan in New Hampshire to give him the information and implore him to help her stop the True Knot. Dan recruits his friend Billy and Abra's father, Dave, to help. They set up an ambush and kill most of the cult, but Billy is killed by Andi before she dies and Dave is killed by Rose's partner, Crow Daddy, who kidnaps Abra. Dan possesses Abra and causes Crow Daddy's car to crash, killing him.

Knowing Rose is coming for them, Dan brings Abra to the now-abandoned Overlook, which is equally dangerous for Rose. Dan sets the hotel's boiler to overload, while briefly confronting an apparition of his father and rejecting an offer to drink.

Rose arrives and overpowers Dan, but he releases the Overlook's occupants from his lockboxes. Drawn to Rose's power, the ghosts devour her before possessing Dan in a bid to make him kill Abra so they can feed on her steam. He goes to the boiler room and regains control before the hotel can make him deactivate it. As fire erupts, he sees a vision of himself as a child being comforted by his mother Wendy. Abra escapes as the Overlook burns down.

Sometime later, Abra speaks to Dan's spirit, who comforts her, telling her to "shine on". Abra tells her mother that Dan and Dave are okay. She then confronts an Overlook ghost and imprisons it in her psychic lockbox.

== Cast ==
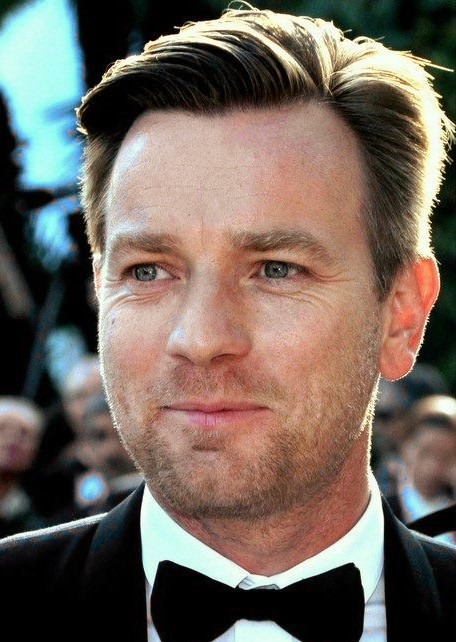
Ewan McGregor plays the role of an aged-up Danny Torrance. Young Danny, who was originally portrayed by Danny Lloyd, is now portrayed by Roger Dale Floyd.

- Ewan McGregor as Dan Torrance, an alcoholic man with psychic powers known as "the shining". The character first appeared as his young self in the film The Shining.
  - Roger Dale Floyd plays a young Danny Torrance (previously portrayed by Danny Lloyd)
- Rebecca Ferguson as Rose the Hat, or "Rosie", the leader of the True Knot, a cult that feeds on people with psychic powers. Ferguson said she had difficulty filming the scene where the True Knot attacks a young child.
- Kyliegh Curran as Abra Stone, or "Abba-do", a girl with "the shining".
  - Dakota Hickman plays a young Abra Stone.
- Carl Lumbly as Dick Hallorann, the late head chef of the Overlook Hotel who has "the shining". Scatman Crothers portrayed the role in The Shining.
- Zahn McClarnon as Crow Daddy, Rose the Hat's lover and right-hand man in the True Knot.
- Emily Alyn Lind as Snakebite Andi, a young member of the True Knot who is able to psychically control people.
- Bruce Greenwood as Dr. John Dalton, leader of Dan's AA group and his boss at the hospice.
- Jocelin Donahue as Lucy Stone, Abra's mother.
- Cliff Curtis as Billy Freeman, Dan's friend, coworker, and AA sponsor
- Robert Longstreet as Barry the Chink (Chunk)⅞ a member of the True Knot.
- Carel Struycken as Grandpa Flick, an aging member of the True Knot.
- Alex Essoe as Wendy Torrance, Dan's mother. Wendy was portrayed by Shelley Duvall in The Shining.
- Zackary Momoh as Dave Stone, Abra's father.
- Jacob Tremblay as Bradley Trevor, a victim of the True Knot, known to Abra as the "baseball boy".
- Henry Thomas as The Bartender, an apparition who calls himself Lloyd but resembles Dan's late father, Jack Torrance; Thomas thus also portrays Torrance briefly in flashback scenes. In The Shining, Torrance was portrayed by Jack Nicholson and Lloyd was portrayed by Joe Turkel. In the director's cut, Thomas additionally portrays the Hotel Caretaker with Torrance's likeness, who in the original film was portrayed by Philip Stone.

Additionally, Catherine Parker appears as Silent Sarey, Met Clark as Short Eddie, Selena Anduze as Apron Annie, and James Flanagan as Diesel Doug, all members of the True Knot cult. Violet McGraw portrays Violet, a child who is murdered at the start of the film by the True Knot cult and later fed to Snakebite Andi as part of her induction into the group, while Bethany Anne Lind portrays Violet's mother. Sadie and KK Heim portray the Grady sisters, with Kaitlyn McCormick and Molly Jackson providing their voices; the characters were originally played by twins Lisa and Louise Burns in The Shining. Sallye Hooks portrays Mrs. Massey, Michael Monks portrays Delbert Grady, and Hugh Maguire portrays Horace Derwent, respectively; played by Lia Beldam and Billie Gibson, Philip Stone, and Norman Gay in The Shining.

== Themes ==
Author Stephen King said he wrote Doctor Sleep because he wondered what Danny Torrance would be like as an adult. The film adaptation's director-writer-editor Mike Flanagan stated, "Danny is so traumatized by what he's been through, he has no idea how to deal with this," and McGregor added, "Dan Torrance's philosophy early on in the story is not to use the shining. He's drunk to suppress the horrible visitations, the spirits that are from the Overlook Hotel."

Flanagan described King's The Shining as "very much about addiction, which is doom. It's about annihilation and the destruction of a family," while Doctor Sleep was about "recovery," stating, "In the way that addiction feels like doom and annihilation, recovery is rebirth, and recovery is salvation, in a way." On themes, Flanagan has stated that "[Doctor Sleep] incorporates a lot of nostalgia from the first film... It also brings in themes that weren't in the first book, and focuses a lot more on the aspects of addiction and recovery."

The Daily Bruin noted that "many elements in the film – particularly during the climax when Rose, Dan and Abra converge in a "shine" to the death – reference recognizable characters and scenes from The Shining."

=== Connections to The Shining novel and film ===
King's The Shining was a 1980 film adaptation produced, co-written, and directed by Stanley Kubrick. King was critical of Kubrick's film to the point of writing and executive-producing a new adaptation with the 1997 television miniseries.

While the Doctor Sleep film is intended to be a direct adaptation of the 2013 sequel novel, Flanagan said the adaptation still "acknowledge[s] Kubrick's The Shining in some way". Flanagan said, "It is an adaptation of the novel Doctor Sleep, which is Stephen King's sequel to his novel, The Shining. But this also exists very much in the same cinematic universe that Kubrick established in his adaptation of The Shining." He explained working with all the sources, "Reconciling those three, at times very different, sources has been kind of the most challenging and thrilling part of this creatively for us." He first read the novel, and then had a conversation with King to work out adapting all the sources. As part of the process, Flanagan recreated scenes from The Shining to use in flashbacks. As did Kubrick with The Shining, Flanagan avoided the horror film trope of jump scares.

On why he wanted to present the film as a continuation of Kubrick's film, Flanagan expressed, "The Shining is so ubiquitous and has burned itself into the collective imagination of people who love cinema in a way that so few movies have. There's no other language to tell that story in. If you say 'Overlook Hotel,' I see something. It lives right up in my brain because of Stanley Kubrick. You can't pretend that isn't the case". King is famously known to dislike Kubrick's adaptation of The Shining, particularly due to omitting several aspects of the novel that were personal to him, such as themes related to alcoholism and its role in the disintegration of family, which Flanagan read as "an examination of his fear of what his alcoholism could do to his family... and he wrote himself hope and sacrifice at the end. None of that is present in the Kubrick film... that was a bridge too far of a personal level for him." The opening of the Doctor Sleep novel was seen as King undoing and avoiding the changes Kubrick made to the Shining film.

During early talks, King's two stipulations for the Doctor Sleep adaptation was that the Overlook would not be present, and that the novel's ending would be retained. King initially rejected Flanagan's pitch of bringing back the Overlook as seen in Kubrick's film, but changed his mind after Flanagan pitched a scene within the hotel towards the end of the film that served as his reason to bring back the Overlook. Upon reading the script, King was so satisfied with the result that he said, "Everything that I ever disliked about the Kubrick version of The Shining is redeemed for me here."

Flanagan later revealed that there were two scenes that convinced King to accept his idea. The first was the scene involving Dan talking with The Bartender in the form of Jack, which was not adapted from either novel and was fully written by Flanagan before finishing his first draft. The second was the ending which directly adapts the final act of The Shining novel that was heavily omitted from Kubrick's film, with Dan and Abra taking the place of the novel's Jack and Danny, as well as the Overlook burning down due to the overloaded boiler. Thus, this film can be seen as a bridge for King's Doctor Sleep and The Shining, incorporating events from both novels. Flanagan said that in his film, "Almost everything Dan does [is] Jack's story from [the original novel]" and that he "really wanted to try to bring back the ending from The Shining novel and give it to Dan." By including these elements into the Doctor Sleep film, Flanagan explained, "I saw it as this gift, to me as a fan, and from me to him as well — that yes, we're going to bring back this Kubrickian Overlook world, and I wanted to celebrate that film. But what if, in doing so, at the same time, you get elements of that ending of that novel, The Shining, that Kubrick jettisoned? Then you start to get the ending you never did, and that King was denied."

== Production ==
=== Development ===
Warner Bros. Pictures began developing a film adaptation of Doctor Sleep as early as 2014. In 2016, filmmaker Akiva Goldsman announced that he would write and produce the film for Warner Bros. For several years, Warner Bros. could not secure a budget for Doctor Sleep, or for a different project, a prequel to The Shining called Overlook Hotel.

In late 2017, Warner Bros. released It, a film adaptation of King's 1986 novel of the same name, and its box office success led the studio to fast track production of Doctor Sleep. In January 2018, Warner Bros. hired Mike Flanagan to rewrite Goldsman's script and direct the film, with Goldsman receiving executive producer credit. On why he was interested in directing Doctor Sleep, Flanagan stated, "It touches on themes that are the most attractive to me, which are childhood trauma leading into adulthood, addiction, the breakdown of a family, and the after effects, decades later."

=== Casting ===
From June to November 2018, the cast was assembled. Owing to the passage of time, many reappearing characters from The Shining had to be recast. Young Danny, his mother Wendy, Dick Hallorann, and the bartender who resembles Jack Torrance all had to be recast. The denizens of the hotel—the Grady sisters, Mrs. Massey (Old Woman in Bath), Delbert Grady, and Horace Derwent—also had to be recast.

Danny Lloyd, who played young Danny Torrance in The Shining makes a cameo appearance in this film as an adult spectator at Bradley Trevor's baseball game. Lloyd had been retired from acting for roughly 38 years and was direct messaged on Twitter by Flanagan to appear in the film. Producer Trevor Macy said of Lloyd's involvement, "[Lloyd] was excited to do [the cameo]. He hadn't acted since [the original]. He's a schoolteacher, and a very successful one at that, like making the world better. He came back for a day, and we were thrilled to have him." When pressed as to why the filmmakers did not extend the same offer to Jack Nicholson, Macy responded, "With Jack, I knew that they approached him for Ready Player One, and that he seems to be very serious about being retired. I had known that he was supportive [of the sequel] but retired."

Regarding the recast characters, Flanagan explained, "We explored everything, and there were only really two options as I saw it: It was either going to be something that was performed, or something that was digital. And even if we had Nicholson come back, based on the rules of the hotel and how the ghosts appear with respect to their age, he'd be performing the part through a digital avatar." Flanagan said that de-aging and digital actors, while improving rapidly, were still inadequate. "The idea of having a digital Danny Torrance riding a trike five minutes into the movie, that just seemed like we were making a video game at that point. It felt disrespectful." Noting that any solution would be controversial, the director decided that the best approach "was not to do impressions; it was to find actors who would remind us of those iconic performances, without ever tipping into parody... I just want to be able to tilt people's memories toward those original actors, but then let the characters be their own. I want to cast someone to play Dick Hallorann; I don't want to cast someone to play Scatman Crothers". The idea of casting a Nicholson impersonator as Jack was also considered, as was casting a big-name actor associated with or reminiscent of Nicholson, such as Leonardo DiCaprio or Christian Slater. Nicholson was also invited to make a cameo appearance as another character, but declined.

=== Filming ===
Filming began in September 2018 in the U.S. state of Georgia; locations included Atlanta, St. Marys, and St. Simons. In the area of Atlanta, specific locations included Covington, Canton, Stone Mountain, Midtown, Porterdale, and Fayetteville. Production concluded in December 2018. By January 2019, Flanagan was editing the film.

=== Music ===
The film score was composed by the Newton Brothers (Andy Grush and Taylor Stewart), who also composed scores for Flanagan's previous works. WaterTower Music has released the film score. The score is heavily inspired by the music of The Shining and includes a reworked rendition of the main theme, "Dies Irae".

Vintage music by Al Bowlly, Ray Noble and Henry Hall is also included in the film, reprising the key part it played in "The Shining". "Home" by Henry Hall & The Gleneagles Hotel Band is available on one release. "And The Bands Played On". Decca DDV 5001/2. The song was never issued before 1977 and was remastered by Keith Gooden & Geoff Milne at Decca in England.

== Release ==
Doctor Sleep had its world premiere at the Regency Village Theater in Westwood, Los Angeles on October 21, 2019. Warner Bros. Pictures released the film theatrically in the United States and Canada on November 8, 2019. They opened the film globally earlier, October 31, 2019, coinciding with Halloween. The film was initially scheduled to be released on January 24, 2020. Deadline Hollywood said the rescheduling reflected Warner Bros. giving "a major vote of confidence" in the film.

=== Home media ===
A director's cut along with the theatrical cut of Doctor Sleep was released on Digital HD on January 21, 2020, and was released on DVD and Blu-ray on February 4. The Blu-ray was also made available in a bundle with the Ultra HD Blu-ray release of the theatrical cut, though the director’s cut itself remained a standard 1080p Blu-ray despite sharing its packaging with the theatrical’s 4K resolution disc. The director's cut is 28 minutes longer.

== Reception ==
=== Box office ===
Doctor Sleep grossed $31.6 million in the United States and Canada, and $40.8 million in other territories, for a worldwide total of $72.4 million.

In the United States and Canada, the film was released alongside Last Christmas, Midway, and Playing with Fire, and was initially projected to gross $25–30 million from 3,855 theaters in its opening weekend. BoxOffice wrote, "Early social and trailer trends are indicative of a potential box office hit should reviews and audience reception prove favorable," but added, "Doctor Sleep's primary barrier to breakout status could be how reliant it is on younger audience familiarity with the source Stephen King novels and/or The Shining." The film made $5.2 million on its first day, including a combined $1.5 million from advanced preview screenings on October 30 and Thursday night previews on November 7, lowering weekend projections to $12 million. It ended up debuting to $14.1 million, getting upset by Midway for the top spot. Deadline Hollywood speculated that despite it being "well-reviewed and well-received" by critics and audiences, the underperformance was due to the 2 1/2-hour runtime, as well as the perception the film was meant for older audiences (67% of the opening weekend attendance was over the age of 24).

Following its debut, it was projected the film would lose Warner Bros. around $20 million. In its second weekend the film made $6.0 million, dropping to sixth. Business Insider speculated that, according to box-office experts, Warner Bros. overestimated The Shining's influence among younger audiences, as well as the mistake Warner Bros. made to release the film worldwide in November after Halloween.

=== Critical response ===
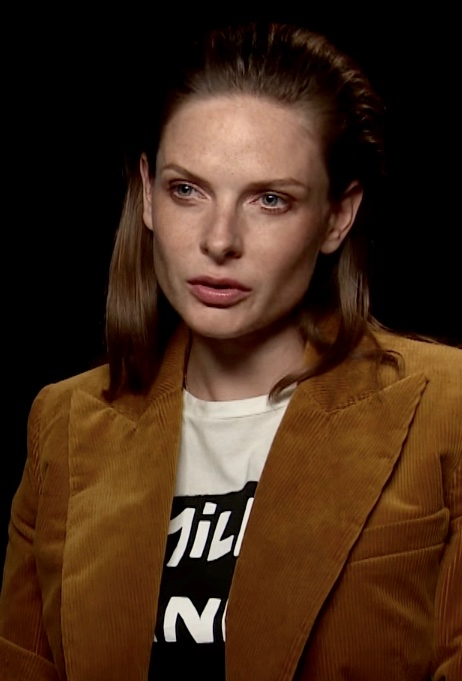
Rebecca Ferguson's performance was praised by critics, winning her the Fangoria Chainsaw Award for Best Supporting Actress.

On the review aggregator website Rotten Tomatoes, 78% of 341 critics' reviews are positive, with an average rating of 7.1/10. The website's consensus reads: "Doctor Sleep forsakes the elemental terror of its predecessor for a more contemplative sequel that balances poignant themes against spine-tingling chills." Metacritic, which uses a weighted average, assigned the film a score of 59 out of 100, based on 47 critics, indicating "mixed or average" reviews. Audiences polled by CinemaScore gave the film an average grade of "B+" on an A+ to F scale, while those surveyed at PostTrak gave it an average four out of five, with 60% saying they would definitely recommend it to a friend.

Brian Tallerico of RogerEbert.com gave the film three out of four, stating, "Flanagan was tasked with making a sequel to a film that stays loyal to a book that ignores the changes made in the first movie. That ain't easy... And while one can sometimes feel Flanagan struggling to satisfy both King and Kubrick fans when he really should be trusting his own vision, he's talented enough to pull off this difficult blend of legacies." Simran Hans of The Guardian gave the film four out of five, noting "adapting Stephen King is one thing, writing a spiritual sequel to a Stanley Kubrick movie quite another. Director Mike Flanagan takes on King's 2013 follow-up novel to The Shining, but adjusts some details to ensure continuity with Kubrick's cult 1980 adaptation of the original book... The new material is fresher and considerably more fun."

BBC's critic Nicholas Barber gave the film four out of five and stated, "Credible in its characterisation, rich in mythological detail, and touchingly sincere in its treatment of alcoholism and trauma, the film is impressive in all sorts of ways. But its greatest achievement is that it makes The Shining seem like a prequel—a tantalising glimpse of a richer and more substantial narrative." Chris Hewitt of Empire gave the film three out of five and noted, "Working off source material that is very different from its predecessor, anyone expecting a straightforward Shining sequel will be disappointed. This isn't a gruelling exercise in pure horror. It's odder and more contemplative, but worth checking in." Kyle Smith of National Review wrote "Though Kubrick's adaptation and The Shawshank Redemption are the only films made from King's stories that achieved greatness, nearly everything he writes contains at least one brilliantly twisted element, and Doctor Sleep has lots of them. It's a shame that more top-tier directors haven't chosen to dig around in the capacious mines of King's imagination."

Peter Travers of Rolling Stone gave the film three out of five stars, saying: "Doctor Sleep relies way too much on borrowed inspiration and eventually runs out of—pardon the word—steam. But this flawed hybrid of King and Kubrick still has the stuff to keep you up nights." Angelica Jade Bastién of Vulture wrote "The film aims in its closing moments to be bittersweet yet hopeful. Instead, it has an unintended, even dour messaging about the cost of escaping your past and whether that's even possible in life. Doctor Sleep could probably never fully stand on its own, and perhaps it's not meant to. It's a horror film with messy pleasures if you're able to meet it on its own level." Todd McCarthy of The Hollywood Reporter stated, "It doesn't have Jack Nicholson, Stanley Kubrick or even much of the Overlook Hotel, but Rebecca Ferguson and other good actors provide some shine of their own in Doctor Sleep, a drawn-out and seldom pulse-quickening follow-up to The Shining that still has enough going on to forestall any audience slumber."

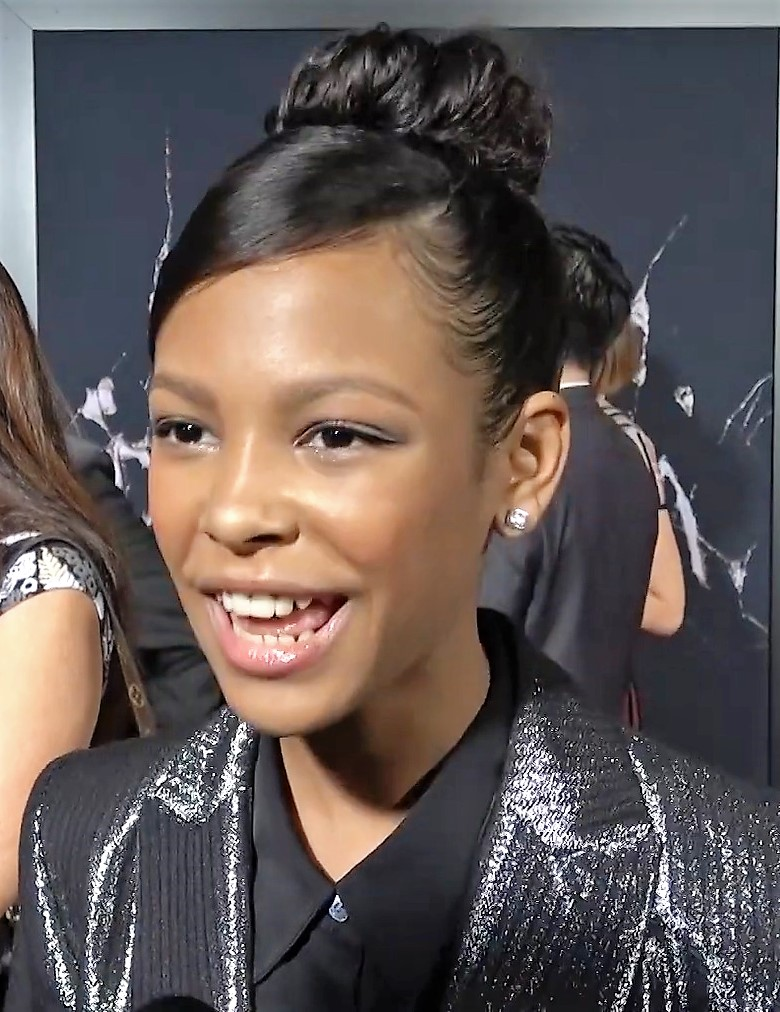
Kyliegh Curran won the Saturn Award for Best Performance by a Younger Actor for her performance.

Tim Grierson of Screen Daily commented, "For a horror director, Flanagan is particularly adept with actors, concerned more about character arcs than cheap frights. That's why Doctor Sleep's uninspired plotting feels even more disappointing. Flanagan gives us such a sense of these people—their demons, their fears, their resilience—that it's a shame that the twists and turns aren't as compelling. Not everyone will make it out alive from the Overlook, but Flanagan brings enough smarts and soul to the flawed, fascinating Doctor Sleep that he manages to escape The Shining's shadow mostly unscathed." Michael O'Sullivan of The Washington Post gave the film two stars out of four and wrote "Part homage to Kubrick's moody atmospherics, and part hyper-literal superhero story, Doctor Sleep is stylish, engrossing, at times frustratingly illogical and, ultimately less than profoundly unsettling... Doctor Sleep will by no means make you drowsy, but it won't keep anyone up at night either." Austin Collins of Vanity Fair added "Doctor Sleep is a horror movie, but what's immediately striking is its sudden breadth, it's humble resistance to the usual perils and thrills of blockbuster. It's refreshing. This is a story that feels larger than it is, in part because this story takes the shine and does something with it, reveals it for the tenuous, impermanent, vulnerable force that it is." Michael Roffman of Consequence of Sound mentioned "Doctor Sleep shouldn't work. Even now, the idea of making a big-budget sequel to arguably the greatest horror film of all time reads like a disaster on paper. Yet, to our surprise, Flanagan's execution warrants its existence."

Tom Philip of GQ wrote, "while Flanagan delivers an ending that sort of respects King's book and rhymes with The Shining's filmed conclusion, it all feels quite forced. At its heart, this is a film about a son rejecting his destiny to become his ghoulish father and forge his own path. It's a shame Doctor Sleep doesn't have the guts to do the same."

David Sims of The Atlantic said, "Flanagan clearly understands how Kubrick's adaptation eclipsed King's attachment to the original story and became entrenched in the broader culture. But this movie is still just a very good facsimile. Doctor Sleep is wonderfully reverent when it comes to Kubrick's film, but that means it can't escape The Shining's shadow, no matter how much King might have wanted it to." Eric Kohn of IndieWire gave the film a C+ grade, commenting, "... Doctor Sleep shows considerable effort to ingratiate itself to discerning cinephiles, from the moody Newton Brothers score to cinematographer Michael Fimognari's dark blue nighttime palette; as a whole, the movie conjures an eerie and wondrous atmosphere that blends abject terror with a somber, mournful quality unique to Flanagan's oeuvre. But his pandering to dueling source material results in a jagged puzzle beneath both of their standards". Alison Foreman of Mashable stated, "Doctor Sleep could have tried to be The Shining's sequel, an intimidated son yearning to be like his father. Instead, it's entirely new... Doctor Sleep isn't The Shining, but it does shine." Justin Chang of the Los Angeles Times wrote, "You can't blame Flanagan for fetishizing the visual iconography of Kubrick's movie, for plunging back into his funhouse of horrors like the proverbial kid in a candy store. But the effect can't help but fundamentally alter the tone and intent of Doctor Sleep, briefly transforming a richly disturbing fantasy into an extravagant act of fan service. It taps into the minutiae of Kubrick's masterwork without fully teasing out its mystery."

=== Accolades ===
Accolades for Doctor Sleep
Award	Date of ceremony	Category	Recipient(s)	Result
Saturn Awards	October 26, 2021	Best Horror Film	Doctor Sleep	Nominated
Saturn Awards	October 26, 2021	Best Actor	Ewan McGregor	Nominated
Saturn Awards	October 26, 2021	Best Actress	Rebecca Ferguson	Nominated
Saturn Awards	October 26, 2021	Best Performance by a Younger Actor	Kyliegh Curran	Won
Saturn Awards	October 26, 2021	Best Director	Mike Flanagan	Nominated
Saturn Awards	October 26, 2021	Best Writing	Mike Flanagan	Nominated
Saturn Awards	October 26, 2021	Best Editing	Mike Flanagan	Nominated
Saturn Awards	October 26, 2021	Best Make-Up	Robert Kurtzman and Bernadette Mazur	Nominated

== Possible sequel ==
Prior to the film's release, Warner Bros. had enough confidence in the film that they hired Flanagan to script a prequel with the working title Hallorann, focusing on the character of Dick Hallorann. Following the disappointing box-office performance of Doctor Sleep, the project was scrapped. However, with the success of the HBO series It: Welcome to Derry, plans for a spin-off focusing on Hallorann have been discussed.

Flanagan also confirmed that he was interested in directing a sequel focused on Abra Stone, and that he had asked King, who was open to the idea.

== See also ==
- Psychic vampire
- List of adaptations of works by Stephen King
- List of vampire films
