= The Shining (miniseries) =

1997 American horror television miniseries

- Promotional poster
- Also known as: Stephen King's The Shining
- Genre: Psychological horror Thriller; Supernatural drama
- Based on: The Shining by Stephen King
- Written by: Stephen King
- Directed by: Mick Garris
- Starring: Rebecca De Mornay; Steven Weber; Wil Horneff; Melvin Van Peebles; Courtland Mead
- Music by: Nicholas Pike
- Country of origin: United States
- No. of episodes: 3

Production
- Cinematography: Shelly Johnson
- Editor: Patrick McMahon
- Running time: 273 minutes
- Production companies: Lakeside Productions; Warner Bros. Television

Original release
- Network: ABC
- Release: April 27 – May 1, 1997

The Shining (stylized as Stephen King's The Shining) is a 1997 three-episode horror television miniseries based on the 1977 Stephen King novel of the same name. Directed by Mick Garris from King's teleplay, it is the second adaptation of King's book after the 1980 film by Stanley Kubrick and was written and produced by King due to his dissatisfaction with Kubrick's version. The miniseries was shot at The Stanley Hotel in Estes Park, Colorado, King's inspiration for the novel, in March 1996.

The 1997 adaptation stars Steven Weber as Jack Torrance; Rebecca De Mornay as Jack's wife Wendy; Courtland Mead and Wil Horneff as different-aged versions of Danny Torrance; and Melvin Van Peebles as Dick Hallorann. Pat Hingle, Elliott Gould, John Durbin, Stanley Anderson, Lisa Thornhill, and Garris' wife Cynthia appear in supporting roles. Several notable writers and filmmakers working in the horror genre cameo in the miniseries' ballroom scene, and King himself appears as an orchestra conductor.

Originally airing from April 27 to May 1, 1997 on the American television network ABC, The Shining enjoyed a favorable reception when it first aired. It was a ratings hit, being in the top 20 of daily viewership numbers for all three episodes; critics noted its depth and atmosphere; and it won two Primetime Emmy and two Saturn Awards.

== Plot ==
The alcoholism and explosive temper that cost Jack Torrance his teaching job also threatens to tear apart his family, after assaulting his 7-year-old son Danny in a drunken rage. Horrified, Jack tells his wife Wendy that should he ever start drinking again, he will leave them one way or another, implying he'd prefer suicide to the risk of harming his loved ones again.

As part of his budding sobriety, Jack takes a high paying job as winter caretaker of the Overlook Hotel, a picturesque summer resort in the Colorado Rockies. He's hopeful the isolation will give him time to complete writing his first play. Manager Stuart Ullman explains the game “Denver croquet”, with its over-sized mallets and balls, was invented by hotel founder Horace Derwent. Danny discovers he can communicate telepathically with the Overlook's head cook, Dick Hallorann, who tells the boy that he, too, "shines". Surprised at the power of Danny's mind, Hallorann departs on a mandatory vacation and tells him to contact him if he needs help: Hallorann will hear, wherever he is. A malevolent force within the hotel determined to use Danny reveals itself. Visions foreshadow what the Torrances will encounter over the winter. Danny is also visited by "Tony", an older man who shows him visions of the events to come.

Jack hears things while exploring the memorabilia-crammed basement. Danny tells Wendy that Jack has become increasingly obsessed with the hotel's history and has become hostile towards him. Wendy wants to leave before the snow gets too deep, but Jack, obsessed with papers he's found, persuades her to stay. He hears his late father's voice from the Overlook's CB radio, telling him Danny must be punished. Jack smashes the radio with a mallet. Danny encounters the hideous ghost of a woman who committed suicide who grabs him and says “We've all been waiting for you.”

The Torrances find Danny dazed, with bruises on his neck, and lipstick on his cheek. He tells them the ghosts forced him to go into the hotel's forbidden Room 217. Hallorann was wrong when he said the ghosts could not hurt them. Wendy tries to escape, but Jack sabotages the snowmobile that is their only means of escape through the harsh winter weather.

A desperate Danny shines to Hallorann, who hastily leaves Florida to find him. The spirits of the Overlook invite Jack into the hotel's shuttered ballroom and ply him with alcohol. Delbert Grady, the Overlook's former caretaker who murdered his family and killed himself, tends bar and invites Jack into a party where he sees dozens of deceased guests. Grady tells Jack that he belongs in this world of depravity, but that first, he must murder his family and Hallorann.

Wendy knocks Jack out. They lock Jack in a cooler. She and Danny agree “it's not Daddy, it's the hotel." However, Grady frees Jack, who assaults Wendy. Injured, she screams for Danny to hide and hobbles away. Warned by Grady, Jack ambushes Hallorann and beats him. Derwent sends Jack to get Danny, and Wendy rouses Hallorann. Tony shows Danny that the boiler is about to explode.

Danny brings Jack—a bloody nightmare—to himself, briefly, and tells him about the boiler. “Jack” races to fix it, but Danny shines to his father, who reverses the valve. Danny, Wendy, and Hallorann escape. Accepting his fate, Jack kills himself by triggering a massive steam explosion that levels the Overlook.

Ten years later at around the age of 17, Danny graduates from high school; he now physically resembles Tony, who is implied to have been his future self. Wendy and Hallorann are present, as is Jack's spirit, telling Danny he loves him. In Colorado, as crews work to rebuild the Overlook, the spirits can be heard playing croquet.

== Cast ==
- Steven Weber as Jack Torrance, the main character of the series.
- Rebecca De Mornay as Wendy Torrance, Jack's wife.
- Courtland Mead as 7-year-old Danny Torrance, Jack and Wendy's son.
  - Wil Horneff as Tony; Danny around age 17
- Melvin Van Peebles as Dick Hallorann
- Pat Hingle as Pete Watson
- Elliott Gould as Stuart Ullman
- John Durbin as Horace Derwent
- Stanley Anderson as Delbert Grady
- Cynthia Garris as Lorraine Massey (Woman in Room 217)
- Lisa Thornhill as Rita Hayworth Look-alike
- Miguel Ferrer as Mark James Torrance
- Michael O'Neill as Doctor Daniel Edwards
- Jan Van Sickle as Al Shockley

Several of Garris' colleagues who work in the horror genre cameo in the miniseries' ballroom scene, such as David J. Schow, Christa Faust, P. G. Sturges, Richard Christian Matheson, and Frank Darabont. Stephen King appears as Gage Creed, the orchestra conductor, and Shawnee Smith cameos as a waitress. Sam Raimi also briefly appears as a gas station attendant.

== Production ==
=== Development ===
The creation of this miniseries is attributed to Stephen King's dissatisfaction with director Stanley Kubrick's 1980 film of the same name. In order to receive Kubrick's approval to re-adapt The Shining into a program closer to the original story, King had to agree in writing to eschew his frequent public criticism of Kubrick's film, save for the sole commentary that he was disappointed with Jack Nicholson's portrayal of Jack Torrance as though he had been insane before his arrival at the Overlook Hotel. ABC's success with previous miniseries adaptations of King's work made them more than willing to offer the author to work on the screenplay for The Shining miniseries with small Broadcast Standards and Practices enforced.

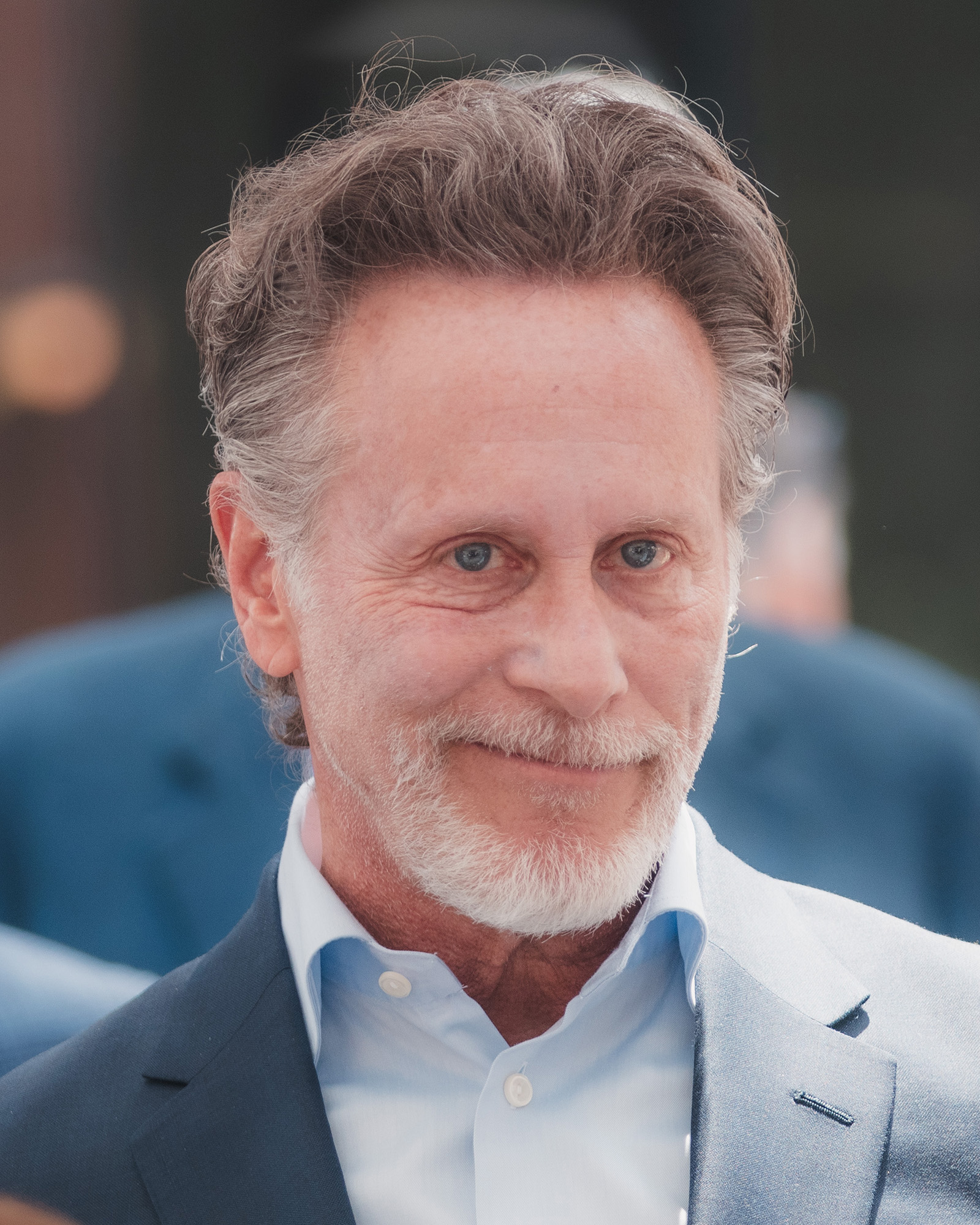
Steven Weber was finally cast as Jack Torrance after the casting team went through a rough time finding an actor for the character.

The casting team had a very difficult time finding an actor for the role of Jack Torrance as most of the considerations who rejected the role worried about being compared to Nicholson's performance in the Kubrick version. Two of the many actors considered included Tim Daly (who had starred with Weber on the TV series Wings) and Gary Sinise. King became very impatient, threatening to "wait another 18 years" if the role for Jack Torrance wasn't booked. Finally, via a suggestion from Rebecca De Mornay, Weber was chosen for the role four days before filming began. Weber accepted the offer because he was a fan of the Mick Garris-directed miniseries for The Stand and found the script he read to be "multi-layered" and relatable. King was the one who chose De Mornay for the role of Wendy. The producers approached her in 1994, and she accepted the role, enjoying the script for being "creepier, more disturbing, and more entertaining," and closer to the novel than the Kubrick version.

=== Filming ===
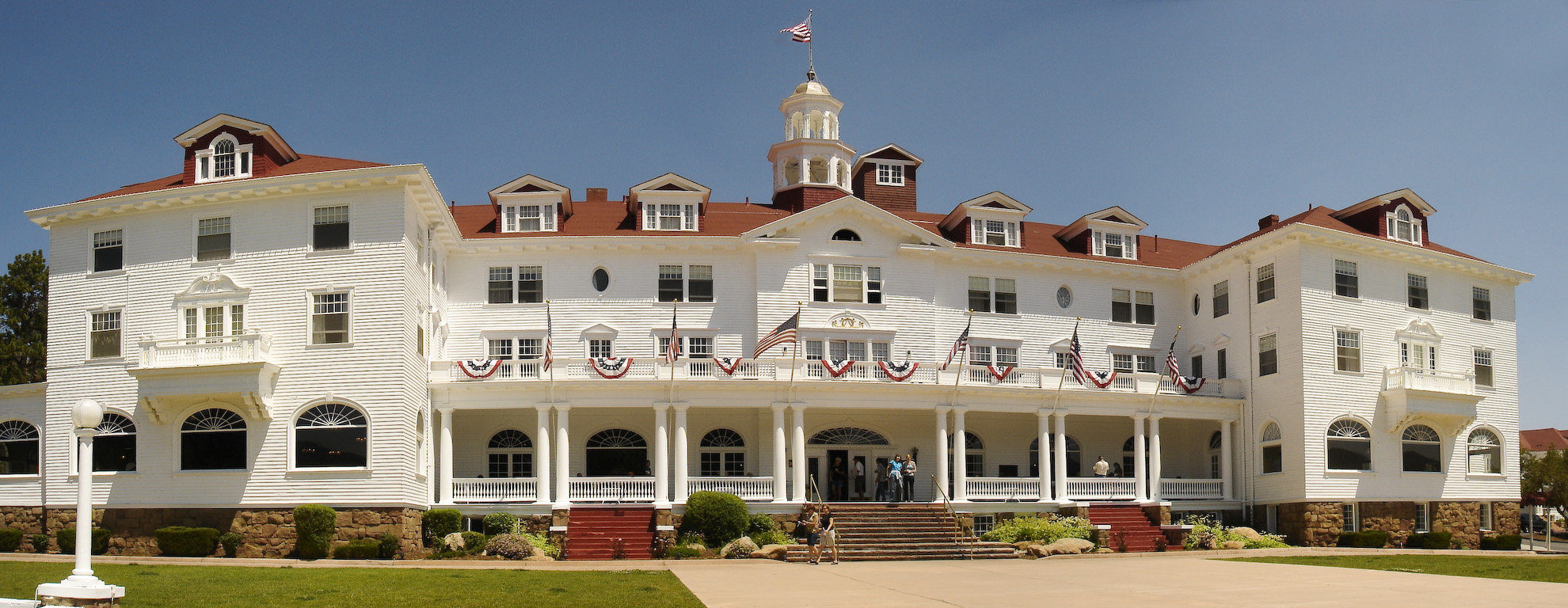
The miniseries was filmed at The Stanley Hotel, the source material's inspiration.

Aside from the motive behind the creation of the miniseries, the 1997 rendition featured an important set piece that helped to inspire the original story: The Stanley Hotel in Estes Park, Colorado. King used the hotel that inspired him to write the book as the miniseries' location, with some interior shots in stages also in Denver. Garris tried to make the hotel feel as "enclosed" as possible to add a vibe of claustrophobia when in a closed hotel; the crew did this by emphasizing the "darkness" of the hotel, painting some of Stanley's areas that had recently been painted white, brown.

The production team began shooting at the Stanley Hotel in March 1996, the date chosen as it was Denver's snowiest month. However, on the day filming began, they realized the hotel as well as most of Estes Park was in a "snow shadow," meaning it garnered the least amount of snow out of all Denver areas. As a result, they spent $100,000 in snowmaking machines sent from Los Angeles while lucking out on "three or four" shooting days with actual snow falling on Estes. Producer Mark Carliner attributed the lucky snowfalls to a Ute shaman doing a ritual at the highest peak of the Rocky Mountains. The cast and crew, such as Cynthia Garris, Mick Garris' wife who plays the woman in Room 217; and Dawn Jeffrey-Nelson, Courtland Mead's acting coach claimed paranormal experiences occurring at the hotel during shooting.

Some of the cast enjoyed working on The Shining. Mead "wasn't scared" as he had acted previously in horror films like Hellraiser: Bloodline (1996); John Durbin enjoyed the "madness" he got to portray with his character of Horace Derwent; and Stanley Anderson, who accepted the part of Delbert Grady based on his disappointment with the Kubrick version, tried to play the character "real" but with "a sense of distance to [his] view of the other and the world, so it comes out as irony or wryness." However, it was tough for Weber to play his character; because the scenes were not shot in chronological order, it was very difficult to master the character's mental state deterioration, due to it occurring gradually as the story progresses.

=== Effects ===
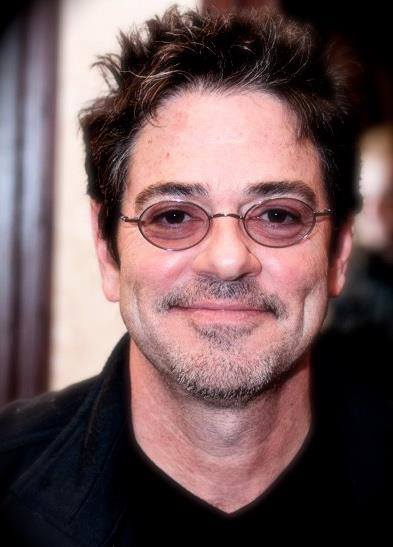
Steve Johnson and his XFX team handled the effects of The Shining.

Steve Johnson and his XFX team were responsible for the effects of The Shining. When it came to the moving topiary animals, both live static and computer-animated versions of them were made. For the more-than-80 dead extra characters in the ballroom, Bill Corso came up with the idea to add black marks on their cheeks and foreheads to make them look dead. A special-effects-predominant ballroom sequence wasn't in the final version, where Gage Creed and his orchestra "run like tallow," in King's words. Garris' reason was that it slowed down the miniseries' pacing and wasn't as "close[] to the real world" as the other scenes. For the makeup of the woman in Room 217, thin shells of Saran Wrap were first glued on to certain areas of the actress' body via K-Y jelly. Then, "some really milky-looking flesh tones" were added over the wrap and purple tones under it, before thin latex was covered over the entire body with certain areas ripped off. Foam latex was also used to slightly alleviate how "creepy" the woman's make-up looked. As Johnson explained what the effects team were going for with the dead lady, "the idea was to try to do something that was different, that would look cool, play in the scene and be allowed on TV."

== Reception ==
The first part of The Shining garnered 19.8 million viewers, ranking #12 for the week with a household rating of 12.5 and a market share of 19. The second part also ranked #12 for the week, with 18.3 million viewers, a 12.1 rating and a 20 share. The third part ranked #14 for the week, with 18.2 million viewers, an 11.9 rating and a 16 share.

The Shining opened to overwhelming praise from critics when it aired in 1997, which included a ten-out-of-ten review from TV Guide. The miniseries' "carefully" and "masterfully crafted" pacing was highlighted by several reviewers, including Ray Richmond of Variety, who also noted its "edge-of-your-seat creepiness" and "surprising emotional complexity and depth." The depth and creepiness was also praised by Ken Tucker of Entertainment Weekly. However, Tom Shales of The Washington Post advised his readers to "avoid [the miniseries] like the plague, because it is the plague."

On Metacritic, it has a weighted average score of 61 out of 100 based on reviews from 14 critics, indicating "generally favorable reviews". Drew Grant of The New York Observer, in 2014, ranked the miniseries as the worst made-for-TV King adaptation.

== Accolades ==
Year	Award	Category	Nominee(s)	Result	Ref.
1997	Artios Awards	Best Casting for TV Miniseries	Lynn Kressel	Nominated	
1997	Online Film & Television Association Awards	Best Miniseries		Won	
1997	Online Film & Television Association Awards	Best Actor in a Motion Picture or Miniseries	Steven Weber	Won	
1997	Online Film & Television Association Awards	Best Actress in a Motion Picture or Miniseries	Rebecca De Mornay	Won (Note: Tied with Glenn Close for In the Gloaming.)	
1997	Online Film & Television Association Awards	Best Supporting Actor in a Motion Picture or Miniseries	Courtland Mead	Nominated	
1997	Online Film & Television Association Awards	Best Supporting Actor in a Motion Picture or Miniseries	Melvin Van Peebles	Won	
1997	Online Film & Television Association Awards	Best Direction of a Motion Picture or Miniseries	Mick Garris	Nominated	
1997	Online Film & Television Association Awards	Best Writing of a Motion Picture or Miniseries	Stephen King	Won	
1997	Online Film & Television Association Awards	Best Costume Design in a Motion Picture or Miniseries		Nominated	
1997	Online Film & Television Association Awards	Best Editing in a Motion Picture or Miniseries		Won	
1997	Online Film & Television Association Awards	Best Lighting in a Motion Picture or Miniseries		Won	
1997	Online Film & Television Association Awards	Best Makeup/Hairstyling in a Motion Picture or Miniseries		Nominated	
1997	Online Film & Television Association Awards	Best Music in a Motion Picture or Miniseries	Nicholas Pike	Won	
1997	Online Film & Television Association Awards	Best New Theme Song in a Motion Picture or Miniseries	Nicholas Pike	Won	
1997	Online Film & Television Association Awards	Best New Titles Sequence in a Motion Picture or Miniseries		Won	
1997	Online Film & Television Association Awards	Best Production Design in a Motion Picture or Miniseries		Won	
1997	Online Film & Television Association Awards	Best Sound in a Motion Picture or Miniseries		Nominated	
1997	Online Film & Television Association Awards	Best Visual Effects in a Motion Picture or Miniseries		Won	
1997	Primetime Emmy Awards	Outstanding Miniseries	Stephen King, Mark Carliner, and Elliot Friedgen	Nominated	
1997	Primetime Emmy Awards	Outstanding Makeup for a Miniseries or a Special	Bill Corso, Douglas Noe, Tracey Levy, Ve Neill, Barry R. Koper, Ashlee Petersen, Jill Rockow, Joe Colwell, Steve Johnson, and Joel Harlow	Won	
1997	Primetime Emmy Awards	Outstanding Sound Editing for a Miniseries or a Special	Thomas DeGorter, Peter Bergren, Kenneth L. Johnson, Brian Thomas Nist, Joe Earle, Bradley C. Katona, Eric A. Norris, Andrew Ellerd, Linda Keim, Bruce Tanis, Ron Evans, Gary Lewis, Barbara Issak, Paul Longstaffe, James Hebenstreit, Stan Jones, Alyson Dee Moore, and Ginger Geary (for "Part 3")	Won	
1998	American Cinema Editors Awards	Best Edited Episode from a Television Mini-Series	Patrick McMahon (for "Part 2")	Nominated	
1998	Golden Reel Awards	Best Sound Editing – Television Mini-Series – Effects & Foley		Nominated	
1998	Saturn Awards	Best Single Genre Television Presentation		Won	
1998	Saturn Awards	Best Genre TV Actor	Steven Weber	Won	
1998	Young Artist Awards	Best Performance in a TV Movie/Pilot/Mini-Series: Young Actor Age 10 or Under	Courtland Mead	Nominated	

== See also ==
- List of ghost films

== Works cited ==
- Warren, Bill (May 1997). "A New Shining". Fangoria. No. 162. pp. 20–25, 75.
