= Doctor Sleep (novel) =

2013 horror novel by Stephen King

- First edition cover
- Author: Stephen King
- Language: English
- Genre: Horror; Gothic; Dark fantasy
- Publisher: Scribner
- Publication date: September 24, 2013
- Publication place: United States
- Media type: Print (Hardcover)
- Pages: 531
- ISBN: 978-1-4767-2765-3
- OCLC: 858924527
- Preceded by: The Shining

Doctor Sleep is a 2013 horror novel by American writer Stephen King and the sequel to his 1977 novel The Shining. The book reached the first position on The New York Times Best Seller list for print, ebook, and hardcover fiction. Doctor Sleep won the 2013 Bram Stoker Award for Best Novel.

The novel was adapted into a film of the same name, directed by Mike Flanagan, which was released on November 8, 2019, in the United States.

== Plot ==
Following the events of The Shining, after receiving a settlement from the owners of the Overlook Hotel, Danny Torrance remains psychologically traumatized as his mother Wendy slowly recovers from her injuries. The two are living in Florida, but angry ghosts from the Overlook, including Mrs. Massey, the woman from Room 217, still want to find Danny and eventually consume his phenomenal "shining" power. Dick Hallorann, the Overlook's former chef, teaches Danny to create mental lockboxes to contain the ghosts, including that of former Overlook owner Horace Derwent.

As an adult, Danny (now going by Dan) takes up his father's legacy of anger and alcoholism. Dan spends years drifting across the United States, but he eventually makes his way to New Hampshire and decides to give up drinking. He settles in the small town of Frazier on a psychic hunch, working first for the Frazier municipal department and then at the local hospice, and attending Alcoholics Anonymous meetings. His psychic abilities, long suppressed by his drinking, re-emerge and allow him to provide comfort to dying patients. Aided by a cat, "Azzie", that can sense when someone is about to die, Dan acquires the nickname "Doctor Sleep".

In the meantime, Abra Stone, a baby girl born in 2001, begins to manifest psychic powers of her own when she seemingly predicts the 9/11 attacks. She slowly and unintentionally establishes a telepathic bond with Dan through Tony, Dan's childhood "imaginary friend". As she grows, the contact becomes more conscious and voluntary, and her shining grows stronger than even his. One night, Abra psychically witnesses the ritual torture and murder of a young boy, Bradley Trevor, by the True Knot, a group of quasi-immortal nomads who possess their own psychic abilities. The True Knot members wander across the United States and periodically feed on "steam", a psychic essence produced when people who possess the shining die in pain. They refer to their victims as Rubes. The True Knot's leader, Rose the Hat, becomes aware of Abra's existence and formulates a plan to kidnap Abra and keep her alive, making her produce a limitless supply of steam.

The True Knot begin to die off from measles contracted from Bradley Trevor; they believe that Abra's steam can cure them. Abra asks for Dan's help, and he reveals his connection with Abra to her father David and their family doctor, John Dalton. Though angry and skeptical, David agrees to go along with Dan's plan to save Abra. With the help of Billy Freeman, a friend of Dan who also possesses a small shining, they foil and kill a raiding party led by Crow Daddy, Rose's second-in-command. However, Dan realizes that Rose will relentlessly hunt Abra for revenge. He visits Abra's great-grandmother Concetta, who is dying of cancer, and telepathically learns from her that he and Abra's mother, Lucy, are half-siblings with the same father: Jack Torrance. As Concetta dies, Dan takes her diseased steam into himself. Meanwhile, dissension among the True Knot, along with Rose's obsession with Abra, leads to the group splitting up, leaving Rose with even fewer followers.

Following another kidnapping attempt that Abra foils with Dan's telepathic help, she baits Rose into confronting her at the location where the Overlook Hotel once stood in the Rocky Mountains in Colorado, now home to a campsite owned by the True Knot. Dan and Billy travel to the site while Abra helps them by using her astral projection. Lying in wait, Dan releases the steam collected from Concetta to the remaining group of True Knot members, killing all of them. He also frees the ghost of Horace Derwent to kill the last member, Silent Sarey, waiting to ambush him and Abra, and the two fight Rose in a long psychic struggle. With help from Billy and the ghost of Dan's father, Jack Torrance, they push Rose off an observation platform so she falls to the ground, breaking her neck and dying. Before leaving the campsite, Dan sees his father wave goodbye, having finally found peace.

In the epilogue, Dan celebrates 15 years of sobriety and attends Abra's 15th birthday party. He tells her about the patterns of alcoholism and violent behavior that run in his family and warns her not to repeat them by starting to drink or submitting to rage. Abra agrees that she will behave, but before they can finish the conversation, Dan is called back to his hospice, where he comforts a dying colleague who had antagonized him in the past.

== Background ==
King described the idea for a sequel to his 1977 novel The Shining on November 19, 2009, during a promotional tour for his novel Under the Dome. During a reading moderated by filmmaker David Cronenberg at the Canon Theatre, King revealed the sequel would follow a character from the original, Danny Torrance, now in his 40s, living in New Hampshire where he works as an orderly at a hospice and helps terminally ill patients die with the aid of extraordinary powers. Later, on December 1, 2009, King posted a poll on his official website, asking visitors to vote for which book he should write next, Doctor Sleep or the next Dark Tower novel:

I mentioned two potential projects while I was on the road, one a new Mid-World book (not directly about Roland Deschain, but yes, he and his friend Cuthbert are in it, hunting a skin-man, which are what werewolves are called in that lost kingdom) and a sequel to The Shining called Doctor Sleep. Are you interested in reading either of these? If so, which one turns your dials more? [We] will be counting your votes (and of course it all means nothing if the muse doesn't speak).

Voting ended on December 31, 2009. Doctor Sleep won the poll with 5,861 votes to The Wind Through the Keyhole's 5,812.

On September 23, 2011, Stephen King received the Mason Award at the Fall for the Book event at the George Mason University in Fairfax, Virginia, during which he read an excerpt from Doctor Sleep. King finished work on the first draft in early November 2011. On February 19, 2012, King read the beginning section of Doctor Sleep at the Savannah Book Festival, in Savannah, Georgia. The audiobook edition of King's 2012 novel The Dark Tower: The Wind Through the Keyhole, released on April 24, 2012, contains the novel's prologue read by the author.

In an interview with Entertainment Weekly, King revealed that he had hired researcher Rocky Wood to work on the continuity between The Shining and Doctor Sleep.

The story was partly inspired by Oscar, a therapy cat who allegedly predicts the deaths of terminally ill patients. King said, "I thought to myself: 'I want to write a story about that.' And then I made the connection with Danny Torrance as an adult, working in a hospice. I thought: 'That's it. I'm gonna write this book.' The cat had to be there. It always takes two things for me to get going. It's like the cat was the transmission and Danny was the motor."

== Publication ==
On May 8, 2012, Stephen King's official website announced a tentative publication date of January 15, 2013, for Doctor Sleep. The book was available for pre-order that same day, with the page count of 544 and ISBN 978-1-4516-9884-8. However, the exact date was removed the next day with the statement that a new release date was forthcoming, and the pre-order items were removed. Stephen King was not happy with the present draft of the novel and felt it needed a lot of editing. On September 18, 2012, a publication date of September 24, 2013 was announced. Cemetery Dance also published Doctor Sleep as a limited edition in three versions: Gift edition (limited to 1,750 copies), Limited edition (limited to 700 copies), and Lettered edition (limited to 52 copies), the latter two signed by Stephen King and the illustrators. On March 1, 2013, Stephen King's official site unveiled the book's cover.

A collector's edition was announced in August 2013 by Hodder & Stoughton for publication in the United Kingdom, limited to 200 numbered copies, signed by Stephen King.

An excerpt was published in the September 13, 2013 issue of Entertainment Weekly magazine.

== Critical reception ==
Steven Poole of The Guardian stated, "Doctor Sleep does not actually deliver the 'good scare' of yore ... What the novel lacks in brute fright, though, it makes up for with more subtle pleasures". Alan Cheuse of NPR wrote, "A rather neatly designed plot has kicked in even before the book opens. ... Stephen King is still scaring the hell out of me." Margaret Atwood in The New York Times commented, "Doctor Sleep is Stephen King's latest novel, and it's a very good specimen of the quintessential King blend ... King's inventiveness and skill show no signs of slacking: Doctor Sleep has all the virtues of his best work." Kathryn Schulz of Vulture stated, "Much as The Shining was fundamentally about family violence, Doctor Sleep is fundamentally about alcoholism. King, a recovering addict himself, is excellent on addiction and its attendant dysfunctions: deception, self-justification, disregard of others, new-leaf fantasies and their near-instant collapse, the next fix as the North Star. And, conversely, he is excellent on deliberate sobriety. Some of the best parts of Doctor Sleep draw on the culture of Alcoholics Anonymous, which also provides this book's ethical core." James Kidd of The Independent stated, "The novel's well-intentioned tale of redemption through sobriety, work and family seems to have profound personal significance for King, himself a recovering alcoholic. Perhaps it is too personal. The Shining had terrified by marrying a recognisable young family to claustrophobia and an unflinching portrayal of a loved one becoming a monster. Doctor Sleep's soupy, supernatural atmosphere reads like horror inspired by fantasy and salvation drawn from therapy. In this, the story doesn't escape its own contrivances." Publishers Weekly called it "less terrifying than its famous predecessor, perhaps because of the author's obvious affection for even the most repellant characters." However, the reviewer stated, "King's latest is still a gripping, taut read that provides a satisfying conclusion to Danny Torrance's story."

The Washington Post's Keith Donohue wrote, "King is a master of the paranormal thriller, cross-cutting among these three plotlines in short cinematic scenes that give Doctor Sleep its relentless narrative drive. His characters, particularly the baddies, are drawn with an economy that brings them briskly to life. Like some twisted bastard son of the Houses of Lovecraft and Dickens, he is as macabre and entertaining as ever ... Despite its many horrors, Doctor Sleep is more assuredly a novel of redemption, well-earned in the end. It won't make you forget Jack Nicholson and his ax, but Doctor Sleep will give you a fresh case of the creeps." Roger Luckhurst of Los Angeles Review of Books stated, "Above all, Doctor Sleep is a novel about addiction and the fight to overcome it ... King's vision of the supernatural is something that hovers numinously on the edges of the awareness, something that needs a cautious and respectful watching at all times. There will be skirmishes, minor battles, victories and losses, but no end to the long term war. Exactly like a recovering alcoholic thinks of booze." Colette Bancroft of Tampa Bay Times noted "At just over 500 pages, Doctor Sleep is a bit slimmer than most of King's recent novels, and it barrels along at an accelerating pace. Is it as bone-chillingly scary as The Shining? No, and few books are. But it's plenty creepy, and it's richer in the themes that have come to occupy King more, especially family relationships." A reviewer of Kirkus Reviews called it "satisfying at every level. King even leaves room for a follow-up, should he choose to write one—and with luck, sooner than three decades hence." Joshua Rothman of The New Yorker stated, "The Shining is introspective, austere, and unsettlingly plausible, which is why it comes to mind whenever you visit a creepy hotel, play croquet, or see an angry dad with his kid. But Doctor Sleep, which feels less like a sequel and more like a spinoff, is unapologetically fun, free-wheeling, and bizarre."

== Film adaptation ==
A film adaptation of the novel directed by Mike Flanagan and starring Ewan McGregor as Danny Torrance was released on November 8, 2019. The film is both an adaptation of the novel and a sequel to the 1980 film adaptation of the first book. It therefore makes significant changes to the plot in order to preserve continuity with Kubrick's 1980 film adaptation.
