= The Black Spot (It: Welcome to Derry) =

7th episode of the 1st season of It: Welcome to Derry

- It: Welcome to Derry episode
- Pennywise (Bill Skarsgård) abruptly awakens from hibernation after the military burn a pillar.
- Episode no.: Episode 7
- Directed by: Andy Muschietti
- Written by: Jason Fuchs; Brad Caleb Kane
- Cinematography by: Daniel Vilar
- Editing by: Matthew V. Colonna; Grant Wooldridge
- Original air date: December 7, 2025
- Running time: 63 minutes

Guest appearances
- Kimberly Guerrero as Rose; Joshua Odjick as Taniel; Morningstar Angeline as Sesqui; Alixandra Fuchs as Terri Bainbridge

Episode chronology
← Previous "In the Name of the Father"	Next → "Winter Fire"

"The Black Spot" is the seventh episode of the American supernatural horror television series It: Welcome to Derry. The episode was co-written by series developer Jason Fuchs and co-showrunner Brad Caleb Kane, and directed by executive producer Andy Muschietti. It was first broadcast on HBO in the United States on December 7, 2025, and also was available on HBO Max on the same date.

In the episode, Clint Bowers and his gang burn down The Black Spot, unleashing a catastrophic event for the patrons, while Bob Gray's past is explored.

The episode received generally positive reviews, with critics praising the Black Spot fire sequence, Muschietti's direction, emotional depth, and acting (particularly Skarsgård, Matilda Lawler, Arian S. Cartaya, and Chris Chalk).

== Plot ==
In 1908, Bob Gray performs as "Pennywise the Dancing Clown" at a carnival. His daughter, Ingrid, aspires to become a clown, and Bob gives her her mother's stage name of "Periwinkle". That night, Bob is approached by a kid in the woods, who asks for his help in finding his parents. He reluctantly accompanies him, but he never returns.

In 1962, Clint Bowers and his gang confront the guests at the Black Spot, demanding Hank to be handed over. Hank offers to surrender, but some of the attendees carry guns, intimidating Bowers' gang into leaving. However, the gang burns down the Black Spot, while also firing at and killing many people inside. Dick Hallorann finds a secret spot to escape and guides Hank, Will and Ronnie into leaving. When they are unable to escape, Rich locks Marge in a fridge to save her from the fire, where the two confess their love before Rich dies. Stan Kersh, a member of the gang and Ingrid's husband, is unable to leave when his car breaks down. Ingrid, wearing her clown costume, shows up, and Pennywise arrives to behead him. He taunts Ingrid, revealing he is not her father, and proceeds to leave to "sleep." Pennywise opens his head, engulfing her with the deadlights.

In the morning, firefighters and paramedics tend to the survivors. Hallorann reveals to Leroy and Fuller that he lost track of Pennywise, but states he knows the location of a pillar. Hank is presumed dead by the authorities, and Charlotte helps him arrange new papers. The massacre is also covered up as an "electrical fire" and blamed on the bar's patrons. The Native Americans learn of the fire and find that the entity consumed the needed amount of bodies, which means it will return in 27 years.

The military finds a pillar and Fuller informs Leroy that the plans have been changed; with the entity asleep, they will take the time to study the pillar, while also trying to find the rest. The pillar is taken to the base, where it is about to be dropped into an incinerator, when Leroy pulls out a gun to stop it. Shaw tells him that he intends to destroy the pillars in order to release the entity and use its powers to scare Americans into unity. The pillar is incinerated, and Shaw assigns Fuller to make sure Leroy does not leave the base. Will is called by a grieving Ronnie, until the voice changes to Pennywise's. Will states he is not afraid, but Pennywise shows up and engulfs him in the deadlights.

== Production ==
=== Development ===
The episode was written by co-showrunners Jason Fuchs and co-showrunner Brad Caleb Kane, and directed by executive producer Andy Muschietti. It marked Fuchs' third writing credit, Kane's third writing credit, and Muschietti's third directorial credit.

=== Writing ===
The episode delves into Pennywise's past, including seeing the human version of Bob Gray in 1908. Fuchs said that the writers asked themselves "Why is It drawn to this form of Pennywise the Dancing Clown, and what is the real story of Bob Gray?", and Stephen King's approval motivated them to properly explore that aspect. Muschietti said, "It is one of those things in the book where you want to open the drawer and see what's inside. That was a big attraction for us. Bill Skarsgård obviously read the book too, and he was very curious about who Bob Gray was, and It's motivation to take this shape. It appears to them as a clown because that's the way he has to basically bait kids, right?" Exploring Pennywise's backstory and Bob Gray's persona was what enticed Skarsgård to reprise his role for the series, as he was initially hesitant to return to the role due to being "something that he did in the past" and having seriously already played a lot of "very dark characters" in Barbarian (2022), John Wick: Chapter 4 (2023), The Crow and Nosferatu (both 2024), but was won over by the prospect of exploring Pennywise's past with Bob Gray, which the Muschiettis had previous discussed doing for a possible third It film.

=== Filming ===
The episode includes the fire of The Black Spot, an event referenced in the novel and films. Muschietti said it was important to adapt the event, "Apart from a dramatic low point, it is a guideline that leads our characters towards a catastrophic conclusion, or, if not a conclusion, a big pivotal point in the story". Barbara Muschietti had previously noted that the Black Spot had been present in the original screenplay of It (2017) that Cary Fukunaga and Chase Palmer wrote before her brother Andy came to the project, but didn't make into the final cut due to budget constraints though they hoped to feature the sequence as the opening for It Chapter Two (2019), which didn't happen. The writers "knew somebody had to go", and decided to have Rich die in the fire. Muschietti said, "Rich is like this character that is so pure and innocent and so full of life. It's the tragic element, you know, of great love stories, like Titanic, or Romeo and Juliet or Doctor Zhivago, where this beautiful love story just doesn't have a great end... Everybody loves him. So it's hard, but the kid had to go".

As the sequence begins, it is filmed as a long take for a few minutes. Muschietti said that he did this to build more tension, "There was a lot of thought put behind it. I really wanted to create an immersive experience of the horror of being inside the Black Spot. That's why the camera, for a long part of the sequence, doesn't come out of it. We are there with the characters". Chris Chalk said that the sequence and the presence of the spirits unnerve Dick Hallorann, "It's interesting [that Pennywise] is not the scariest thing in Dick Hallorann's life — not even close. Dick can see every dead thing on earth, and if it looks at him, it talks to him. He can commune with different realities and he doesn't have control over that. You could go insane in a microbeat".

== Reception ==
"The Black Spot" earned generally positive reviews from critics. Tom Jorgensen of IGN gave the episode a "good" 7 out of 10 rating and wrote in his verdict, "'The Black Spot' sees Andy Muschietti take off flying with a stellar prologue full of intriguing Pennywise backstory, but as the Augery brings It's cycle of death to a harrowing close, the dummies over on the Air Force base can't help stumbling into one more mission in next week's finale, no matter the cost to common sense. Though the narrative's clunky, excellent performances from Bill Skarsgård, Arian S. Cartaya, Matilda Lawler, and Chris Chalk are enough to keep Welcome to Derry's penultimate episode focused on the show's greatest strength: examining human drama through the lens of the greatest horrors imaginable."

William Hughes of The A.V. Club gave the episode a "C–" grade and wrote, "Welcome to Derry has been so focused on the cheap scares of the actual creature in its midst that it's done almost nothing to bolster the metaphorical one. With its characters so isolated into sequestered scenes, and its supporting cast a loose assemblage of mean girls, bad husbands, and drunk-hick cops all pulled directly from central casting, the show has failed to make Derry feel like anywhere — let alone cultivate the vibe of fearful cruelty Shaw is trying to invoke here. There's a version of this idea that works, where we've spent seven episodes watching dread narcotize a town's population into fitful order, only to reveal that it's been the master plan all along. But it's simply not what this team has been able to put up on the screen."

Louis Peitzman of Vulture gave the episode a 3 star rating out of 5 and wrote, "This close to the end of the season, I've come to accept that It: Welcome to Derry is a show I'm going to struggle with. But as frustrating as the storytelling can be, I can't deny there are individual elements that really work. That's certainly the case in 'The Black Spot', an obvious improvement over last week's installment but an episode that left me with some burning questions." Eric Francisco of Esquire wrote, "It: Welcome to Derry episode 7, 'The Black Spot', plays out an inevitability: The burning of Derry's only Black-owned bar. What was just a few sentences in Stephen King's novel and described in retrospect is now fleshed out with all the necessary horror and rage it demands. The tragedy of a community in peril is that no matter who its perpetrators are, violence follows them. You can also say that about everyone in Derry."

Zach Dionne of Decider wrote, "The entity is indeed resting, as the clown, in a pool of blood and bodies and organs. Did it forget it doesn't need a costume anymore? Composer Benjamin Wallfisch does one of his creepiest moves here, a cacophony of singsongy voices crescendoing to screams as we settle on Pennywise's face. It's eyes open; the work's not done." Shawn Van Horn of Collider gave the episode a 9 out of 10 rating and wrote, "HBO Max's It: Welcome to Derry has been filled with many twists and turns so far in its first season. Andy Muschietti, who directed the two It feature films, has taken the smaller moments from Stephen King's novel and made them the focus."

Sean T. Collins of The New York Times wrote, "To its credit, Welcome to Derry is an upsetting show, from the giddy way in which its supernatural entity torments Its victims to the all-too-believable fashion in which racism and militarism quite literally feed It. I both anticipate and dread what Pennywise will do for Its final trick of the season."

TVLine named Bill Skarsgård their "Performer of the Week" on December 13, 2025 for his performance in the episode.

=== Accolades ===
Award	Category	Nominee	Result	Ref.
Art Directors Guild Awards	One-Hour Period Single-Camera Series	Paul Austerberry	Nominated	
