= The Thing in the Dark =

2nd episode of the 1st season of It: Welcome to Derry

- It: Welcome to Derry episode
- Lilly Bainbridge (Clara Stack) in the supermarket having a vision of her father turned into pickles inside jars.
- Episode no.: Season 1 Episode 2
- Directed by: Andy Muschietti
- Written by: Austin Guzman
- Cinematography by: Daniel Vilar
- Editing by: Ethan Sokolow
- Original air dates: October 31, 2025 (HBO Max); November 2, 2025 (HBO)
- Running time: 66 minutes

Guest appearances
- Kimberly Norris Guerrero as Rose; Joshua Odjick as Taniel; Alixandra Fuchs as Terri Bainbridge

Episode chronology
← Previous "The Pilot"	Next → "Now You See It"

"The Thing in the Dark" is the second episode of the American supernatural horror television series It: Welcome to Derry. The episode was written by co-executive producer Austin Guzman, and directed by executive producer Andy Muschietti. It was released on HBO Max on October 31, 2025 and was broadcast on HBO in the United States on November 2, 2025.

In the episode, Lilly and Ronnie face the aftermath of the events at the movie theater, while Leroy investigates the attack from the masked men.

According to Nielsen Media Research, the episode was seen by an estimated 0.155 million household viewers and gained a 0.03 ratings share among adults aged 18–49. The episode received positive reviews from critics, who praised the production values, character development and opening credits sequence, although some felt that the series was over-stuffed with subplots.

== Plot ==
After the attack in the movie theatre, Hank Grogan is blamed by the citizens of Derry for the incident. Police chief Clint Bowers is scolded for not arresting Hank, but is unable to find any evidence he was involved. Leroy welcomes his wife Charlotte and son Will, who have arrived in Derry. He is further informed by Colonel Fuller that while Masters has taken the blame for the night attack, he refuses to expose the other masked men.

Despite being traumatized, Lilly returns to school after a few days, and ignores her friend Marge's attempts to fit in with her friends. While shopping in town, Charlotte tries to stop several schoolchildren from beating a younger boy, but receives disapproving looks from the adults, who otherwise ignore the fight. That night, Ronnie experiences a hallucination wherein she is pulled out of her dead mother's womb, who blames her for her death. Ronnie tells Lilly about her vision, and they discuss the version of events at the theater.

At a military dig site just outside of Derry, Colonel Fuller admonishes airman Dick Hallorann for his lack of progress locating something he believes his "gifts" will guide him to. Chief Bowers takes Lilly out of school and brings her to the station, asking her to recant her testimony of the incident. Under threat of being sent back to Juniper Hill Psychiatric Hospital, Lilly is forced to claim that Hank was in the theater that night, resulting in his arrest and a devastated Ronnie confronts Lilly over this. While shopping, Lilly faces another hallucination, a monstrous, dismembered apparition of her father. Concerned over her mental state, Lilly's mother sends her back to Juniper Hill.

Leroy visits Masters in his cell; he has deduced that he was not one of the masked men, as he is unable to properly load and use a specific firearm that his assailants were adept with. He relays this to General Shaw, who reveals that the attack was staged by him as a test. He explains that this was done to see if Leroy could earn his trust, and shows him their secret project, Operation Precept. As tensions arise in the Cold War, the project aims to locate a fear-inducing "weapon", which they believe is buried somewhere in the area, to aid in the war effort. Fuller arrives to inform them that they found something at the site; a car full of skeletons, believed to be a "beacon" to locate the weapon.

== Production ==
=== Development ===
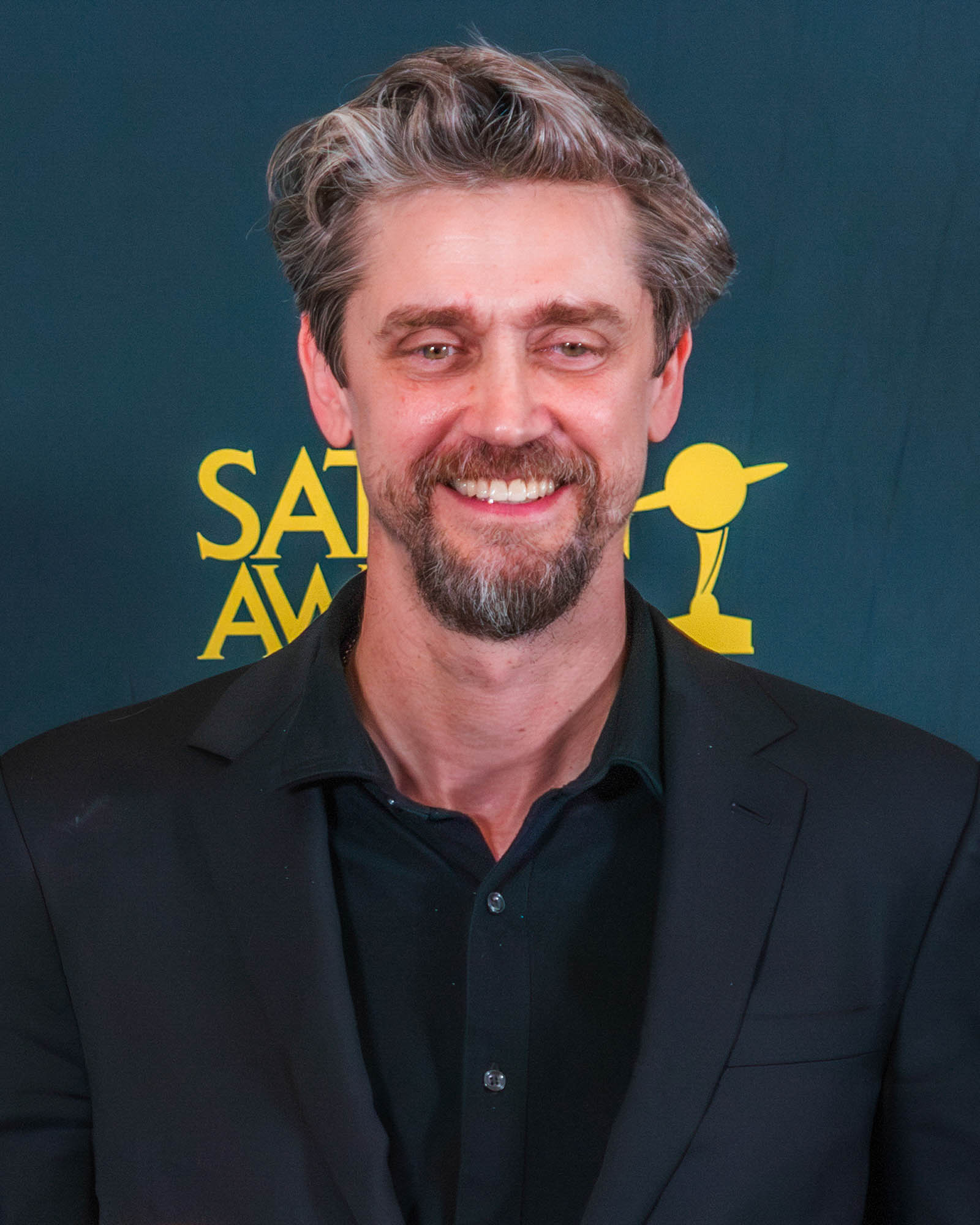
Andy Muschietti, director of the films, returned to direct the episode.

The episode was written by co-executive producer Austin Guzman, and directed by executive producer Andy Muschietti. It marked Guzman's first writing credit, and Muschietti's second directing credit.

=== Writing ===
Co-showrunner Brad Caleb Kane said that Lilly's hallucination in the shopping market is used to reflect her own fears, "Lilly saw her dad in pieces and this was about bringing that visual back in an absolutely horrible way. Lilly also feels responsible for the death of her dad, and of course she's not. She's just a child; it's not her fault that the machinery pulled him in and tore him apart as it did. But she doesn't trust her own judgment in some ways. There's a part of her that worries that she's still to blame for all of this. That's a really interesting starting point for what I hope is an emotional journey for a character who has to come into her own. This is a coming of age story for these kids, and Lilly most of all".

The episode also features a more prominent appearance by Dick Hallorann, played by Chris Chalk. Co-showrunner Jason Fuchs said that the series could be seen as an origin story for the character, "You're seeing him in an earlier moment in his life and in his journey. He's not the man you meet in The Shining. He doesn't have control over his abilities yet in the way that he one day will".

=== Opening credits sequence ===
The episode introduces an opening credits sequence, created by Filmograph, using the song "A Smile and a Ribbon" by Patience and Prudence. Andy Muschietti felt that the name Welcome to Derry felt "touristic", and leads the viewer to "the world of postcards and facade". He also said that the sequence properly depicted Derry as "a place that's seemingly wholesome, but there's something dreadful under the surface".

== Reception ==
=== Viewers ===
In the original American broadcast, "The Thing in the Dark" was seen by an estimated 0.155 million household viewers with a 0.03 in the 18–49 demographics. This means that 0.03 percent of all households with televisions watched the episode. This was a 54% decrease in viewership from the previous episode, which was seen by an estimated 0.334 million household viewers with a 0.10 in the 18–49 demographics.

=== Critical reviews ===
"The Thing in the Dark" earned positive reviews from critics. Tom Jorgensen of IGN gave the episode an "okay" 6 out of 10 rating and wrote in his verdict, "The disturbing imagery and creeping tension remain strong through It: Welcome to Derry's second episode which, like the premiere, is at its best when terrorizing the kids in town. But some outlandish developments at the air base seem to be pointing the conspiracy plot in surprising and not-all-that-convincing directions. It may be an uphill battle for the show to reconcile this with the more grounded psychological horrors going on in Derry, even if those grounded psychological horrors are being driven by an interdimensional monster that looks like Bill Skarsgård stayed out of the sun for way too long."

William Hughes of The A.V. Club gave the episode a "B+" grade and wrote, "while the premiere seemed mostly content to poke a stick at easy Stephen King signifiers as it trotted along toward its big, twisty bloodbath, 'The Thing in the Dark' begins tearing into those aspects of the author's work that continue to make It such a compelling, queasy read nearly 40 years after its publication."

Louis Peitzman of Vulture gave the episode a 4 star rating out of 5 and wrote, "There are also some obvious narrative limitations to consider: Pennywise won't be defeated for good until 2016, and the ending of the Black Spot tale has already been told. None of this is to say that Welcome to Derry can't work on its own terms, but I can't help asking what story the show is trying to tell when it's already feeling this overstuffed. The second episode is heavy on introductions and reveals without a clear anchor, and that makes for a muddled hour, despite some real bright spots."

Meghan McCluskey of TIME wrote, "While we're guessing the Hanlon he'll be rescuing this time around will be Leroy, it seems as though Dick's bravery will still ensure the chain of events that ultimately allows the Losers Club to defeat It over 50 years later is set in motion." Shawn Van Horn of Collider gave the episode a 7 out of 10 rating and wrote, "An old car from the 1930s has been dug up, and out of it tumbles several human skeletons. They're getting close."

Eric Francisco of Esquire wrote, "'The Thing in the Dark,' the second episode of what is becoming the show to watch this fall, is another hour of harrowing adolescence and the ugliness of a time period so many believe to be America's greatest." Zach Dionne of Decider wrote, "Operation Precept is a wild development. The idea of this many adults knowing this much about It, and wanting to turn the entity into a Russian nuclear deterrent, is certainly a bold invention by the show. Will it turn people off? Is bold the right word?"

Sean T. Collins of The New York Times wrote, "Whatever the case, adding a black ops element to It is in keeping with King's existing preoccupations. In that it depicts the impunity of the government to impose its military on unsuspecting communities at will, it also has the benefit of being timely." Ben Sherlock of Screen Rant wrote, "Cartoonish horror like this can work, but you have to balance out the splatstick with something truly disturbing for it to actually scare the audience. Having said that, while the horror side of things is still a let-down, I'm starting to get swept up in the dramatic elements. I'm invested in Lilly and Ronnie's search for the truth, and I'm invested in the Hanlons' struggle to assimilate into their bizarre new town. There's hope that It: Welcome to Derry can become a great show yet."
