= The Great Swirling Apparatus of Our Planet's Function =

4th episode of the 1st season of It: Welcome to Derry

- It: Welcome to Derry episode
- Dick Hallorann (Chris Chalk) discovering the origin of the entity and the first forms it took
- Episode no.: Season 1 Episode 4
- Directed by: Andrew Bernstein
- Written by: Helen Shang
- Cinematography by: Rasmus Heise
- Editing by: Glenn Garland; Matthew V. Colonna; Esther Sokolow
- Original air date: November 16, 2025
- Running time: 62 minutes

Guest appearances
- Kimberly Norris Guerrero as Rose; Rudy Mancuso as Captain Pauly Russo; Joshua Odjick as Taniel; Morningstar Angeline as Sesqui; Thosh Collins; Kiawentiio as Necani

Episode chronology
← Previous "Now You See It"	Next → "29 Neibolt Street"

"The Great Swirling Apparatus of Our Planet's Function" is the fourth episode of the American supernatural horror television series It: Welcome to Derry. The episode was written by supervising producer Helen Shang, and directed by executive producer Andrew Bernstein. It was first broadcast on HBO in the United States on November 16, 2025, and also was available on HBO Max on the same date.

In the episode, Lilly and the gang continue being haunted by strange events, while Leroy grows more suspicious of the military's actions.

According to Nielsen Media Research, the episode was seen by an estimated 0.286 million household viewers and gained a 0.07 ratings share among adults aged 18–49. The episode received mostly positive reviews from critics, who praised the character development, special effects, and answers to mysteries.

== Plot ==
Lilly, Ronnie, Will, and Rich take the photographs to Chief Bowers, but are shocked to discover that the creatures don't appear in them. Bowers dismisses their concerns and orders them to leave.

While fishing with Leroy at the lake, Will is pulled into the water by a monster resembling a burned image of Leroy from the war. As Leroy comforts him, they see a red balloon floating in the distance. Charlotte blackmails a police officer into visiting Hank in jail, revealing that his conviction was illegal since he was charged without a bail hearing. However, Hank confesses to having an affair with a white woman. Later, Leroy confronts her about visiting the police station. That night, Will uses the telescope and sees a shadowy figure watching him on the street, which terrifies him and alerts Leroy.

At school, Lilly and Marge reconcile, and Lilly goes to the bathroom to freshen up when she sees a boy staring at her, unaware that it's a prank by Marge and her friends. Marge goes to the bathroom, but feels guilty about the prank she's about to play. Before she can tell Lilly, two worm-like creatures crawl out of her eyes, forcing her to flee to the woodshop to remove them. Lilly stops her before she stabs herself, but some students enter and believe she has stabbed Marge.

After finding another red balloon, Leroy demands to know the purpose of the Project. Shaw shows him an interrogation in which a Native American, Taniel, crossed the fence to approach the site. Dick Hallorann uses his power to enter Taniel's mind and see a memory of him talking to his Aunt Rose about a spirit called "Tha Galloo". The spirit came to Earth millions of years ago and terrorized people until Native Americans forged a dagger from a fragment of the spirit's star, which contained it. But with the arrival of settlers, the spirit fed on them and grew stronger. The Native Americans took fragments of its star and used them to contain the spirit in the forest, which would later become Derry. When Hallorann asks about the location of the pillars, Taniel points him to a door leading to a black house on Neibolt Street.

== Production ==
=== Development ===
The episode was written by supervising producer Helen Shang, and directed by Andrew Bernstein. It marked Shang's first writing credit, and Bernstein's second directing credit.

=== Writing ===
Taylour Paige explained Charlotte's actions in the episode, "I think you get to really see her in action. You get to see her passion, her integrity, her morale and her relentless spirit. Also, in an interesting way, although it's pure from Charlotte, her activism is a product of the boredom and the stirring in Derry. When she was in the South, there was such camaraderie, even though the South was wrought with such craziness. But in Derry, she's alone and its isolating and she wants to help this other Black family".

Chris Chalk said that Dick Hallorann's knowledge of Pennywise's origin story negatively impacted his view of the world, "It's like, what becomes of a man who thinks he's the most powerful person in his universe and then realizes he's just a cog in the wheel. He discovers he's not powerful in his military posts, because I mean how long is the general going to let this little black dude come around like 'f–k you guys'". Joshua Odjick commented, "It gets hard for Taniel. There's a feeling Taniel has betrayed his people. But he had no control".

=== Filming ===
For the scene where Marge has worm-like creatures emerging from her eyes, prosthetics were placed in Matilda Lawler's head. Lawler commented, "It had these circles that kind of looked like big, gory glasses. [The VFX team] attached wires to the prosthetic and CGI'd the snail eyes on top of those wires. It was definitely a little strange to be having a meltdown over these wires sticking out of my head". Andy Muschietti also said that the scene was used to highlight her fear, "There's a specific reason that's not going to be revealed until the very last episode for which she is wearing the Coke bottle glasses. And so we decided that [her fear] was about the eyes".

== Reception ==
=== Viewers ===
In the original American broadcast, "Now You See It" was seen by an estimated 0.286 million household viewers with a 0.07 in the 18–49 demographics. This means that 0.07 percent of all households with televisions watched the episode. This was a slight increase in viewership from the previous episode, which was seen by an estimated 0.279 million household viewers with a 0.09 in the 18–49 demographics.

=== Critical reviews ===
"The Great Swirling Apparatus of Our Planet's Function" earned mixed-to-positive reviews from critics. Tom Jorgensen of IGN gave the episode an "amazing" 9 out of 10 rating and wrote in his verdict, "'The Great Swirling Apparatus of Our Planet's Function' meaningfully moves forward every one of Welcome to Derry's storylines, packs a wallop on the horror front, and reveals some interesting new details about Pennywise's initial arrival in Derry millions of years in the past - just the shot in the arm Welcome to Derry needed halfway into its first season."

William Hughes of The A.V. Club gave the episode a "B" grade and wrote, "I hold out some hope that the show has at least some sense of where it's going with all of this on a more metaphorically resonant level. But, then, whoops, suddenly it's all magic rocks, or the military sending soldiers into the tunnels under the house on Neibolt street, or all the other things that make me think the show doesn't have more on its mind but 'It, but stretched out over multiple episodes'. As is, all I can do is keep searching and take the stomach-churning highs as they come."

Louis Peitzman of Vulture gave the episode a 3 star rating out of 5 and wrote, "while this week's episode is better than the last, I'm struck even more strongly by a sense of wheel-spinning. We get more kindertrauma and more exposition (so much exposition), but it still feels a bit like we're walking in circles. Now that we're halfway through the season, I'd love a clearer sense of where the story is going, particularly when it comes to the younger characters, who at this point are mostly just there to get traumatized."

Eric Francisco of Esquire wrote, "I'm bitter that It: Welcome to Derry has bummed me out for the second week in a row. But I'm also a cheap date. If Marge's bulging eyes was enough to spook me, I can't wait to see what's behind those doors."

Zach Dionne of Decider wrote, "Let's take it back millions of years, straight to the end of the episode. Seeing It crash to Earth in Stephen King's 1986 novel and, briefly, in 2019's It: Chapter Two is one of the most entrancing moments in the story. In Episode 4 of IT: Welcome To Derry, we have the dark pleasure of seeing the arrival and aftermath fleshed out at length." Chris Gallardo of Telltale TV gave the episode a 4 star rating out of 5 and wrote, "Overall, It: Welcome to Derry Season 1 Episode 4 ramps up the chill factor as the Losers Club, Charlotte, Leroy, and Hallorann unbury interesting truths about It, Derry's societal climate, and each other."

Sean T. Collins of The New York Times wrote, "As it has been since that first batch of terrific child actors was killed off, the acting remains a series highlight. Chris Chalk alternates effortlessly between terrified and terrifying as Dick, while Lawler somehow makes you feel bad for the treasonous Margie, even before she carves her own eye out."
