= Now You See It (It: Welcome to Derry) =

3rd episode of the 1st season of It: Welcome to Derry

- It: Welcome to Derry episode
- Episode no.: Season 1 Episode 3
- Directed by: Andrew Bernstein
- Written by: Guadalís Del Carmen; Gabe Hobson
- Cinematography by: Rasmus Heise
- Editing by: Matthew V. Colonna; Grand Wooldridge
- Original air date: November 9, 2025
- Running time: 58 minutes

Guest appearances
- Kimberly Norris Guerrero as Rose; Rudy Mancuso as Captain Pauly Russo; Joshua Odjick as Taniel; Alixandra Fuchs as Terri Bainbridge

Episode chronology
← Previous "The Thing in the Dark"	Next → "The Great Swirling Apparatus of Our Planet's Function"

"Now You See It" is the third episode of the American supernatural horror television series It: Welcome to Derry. The episode was written by Guadalís Del Carmen and Gabe Hobson, and directed by executive producer Andrew Bernstein. It was first broadcast on HBO in the United States on November 9, 2025, and also was available on HBO Max on the same date.

In the episode, Lilly and Ronnie work together to find a photograph of the creature with the help of Will and Rich, while Hallorann is brought in for a special assignment.

According to Nielsen Media Research, the episode was seen by an estimated 0.279 million household viewers and gained a 0.09 ratings share among adults aged 18–49. The episode received mixed reviews from critics, who praised the character development and military storyline, but criticized the visual effects and the cemetery climax.

== Plot ==
In 1908, a young Francis Shaw visits a carnival and is convinced to enter an attraction featuring freak shows. There, he encounters an old man with a missing eye, who scares him, saying, "Now you see it", before Francis flees the carnival. His father, Monty, takes him home. When their car breaks down, Francis gets water from a Native girl, Rose, by giving her his slingshot, and they establish a friendship. While playing in the woods, Francis is stalked by the old man, who transforms into a large monster. Rose hits it with the slingshot, and they escape the woods.

In 1962, Lilly is released from Juniper Hill and talks with Ronnie about her visions. They meet with Will to ask him to develop the film seen at the movie theater. Shaw is told that the retrieved car belonged to a bandit leader who, along with his gang, was shot by angry townspeople in 1935. Fuller assigns Hallorann to accompany a flight conducted by Leroy and Pauly, as Shaw believes he needs to get closer to the area to locate the weapon. To help, Shaw gets Hallorann to touch his slingshot, which makes him find himself in the sewers. He is confronted by an entity, who torments him with the memory of his dead grandmother. Hallorann nearly falls out of the helicopter but is saved by Leroy. He shares his findings with Shaw but warns that they should avoid it.

Shaw meets with Rose, asking for her help in investigating the dig site, although Rose maintains the Native American community is worried that they might be interfering with ancestral remains. Hallorann dines with Leroy and his wife Charlotte, but Leroy is taken aback when he mentions Will, as he did not reveal this to anyone in the Air Base. He privately tells Hallorann that he knows he was one of the masked men who attacked him that night. Hallorann subsequently reveals that when he felt Leroy's emotions that night, he saw no fear in him.

Lilly, Ronnie, Will and Rich visit a cemetery at night, hoping to use a ritual by Rich's uncle to summon the creature. When Rich reveals he does not exactly know how to do it, Lilly and Ronnie leave on their bikes. However, they are attacked by a creature, which causes them hallucinations. They barely escape but manage to take pictures of the creatures. They develop the pictures, which depict the ghosts of Teddy and Susie, as well as a clown in the distance.

== Production ==
=== Development ===
The episode was written by Guadalís Del Carmen and co-producer Gabe Hobson, and directed by Andrew Bernstein. It marked Del Carmen's first writing credit, Hobson's first writing credit, and Bernstein's first directing credit.

=== Writing ===
For the sequence in the plane, Chris Chalk said that Dick Hallorann thought he could "control" the situation, "There's a calm, because he knows it's in the psychic realm and nothing can hurt him". For the sequence, Chalk based it on real-world people pushing psychic barriers through herbalism and witchcraft across different cultures, although he did not seek a film for inspiration since any other fictional depictions would be "just another person guessing".

Regarding the ending, co-showrunner Brad Caleb Kane wanted to raise the question over whether Pennywise was in the photograph, "Is that Pennywise at the end of 103? I don't know. We think it is... as you can tell by the end of the first episode, we tried to pull the rug out from underneath the audience. So right away, you feel like, no matter who I'm rooting for, nobody is safe in this show, and nothing is as it seems, and anything can happen".

=== Filming ===
The cemetery sequence took around one week to film, due to the night setting required. Amanda Christine said that despite filming past midnight, "it was fun. It was really fun. We were just silly because, I mean, we were kids and literally were [working] off of no sleep. So we were just running around doing whatever in the graveyard for real". Blake Cameron James added, "Of course, the ground wasn't cracking in front of us, so we just had to move our bikes back and forth. It was kind of crazy; I wondered how they were going to make it look".

== Reception ==
=== Viewers ===
In the original American broadcast, "Now You See It" was seen by an estimated 0.279 million household viewers with a 0.09 in the 18–49 demographics. This means that 0.09 percent of all households with televisions watched the episode. This was a 80% increase in viewership from the previous episode, which was seen by an estimated 0.155 million household viewers with a 0.03 in the 18–49 demographics.

=== Critical reviews ===
"Now You See It" earned mixed reviews from critics. Tom Jorgensen of IGN gave the episode a "mediocre" 5 out of 10 rating and wrote in his verdict, "Dick Hallorann's introduction to Pennywise and some interesting backstory for General Shaw aside, both the horror and drama are lacking in IT: Welcome to Derry's largely inert third episode. We're already almost at the halfway mark for this prequel series, which promises to focus on a different time period each season, so Welcome to Derry can't afford many misfires like this going forward if it wants to be taken seriously as a legitimate chapter in Stephen King's larger world of fiction."

William Hughes of The A.V. Club gave the episode a "C+" grade and wrote, "three episodes in, Welcome To Derry remains a well-acted, interestingly plotted drama for adults that only grudgingly seems to share time with a much-less accomplished children's horror show. I dearly want these two sides of the series' brain to be in fuller conversation with each other, for the horror to bleed into the adult world, and for more psychological nuance to pop up among its kids. For now, though, it remains a show where you pick and choose a few high spots amid a buffet of far more prosaic fare."

Louis Peitzman of Vulture gave the episode a 2 star rating out of 5 and wrote, "“When and where the clown is going to appear was a game that I wanted to play with the audience.” While I respect that rationale, the constant teasing of Pennywise is really starting to grate. “Now You See It” presents multiple chances for the dancing clown to pop up, only to pull back. Even as the show's disparate story lines begin to cohere, it's hard not to feel frustrated by this increasingly tedious restraint."

Eric Francisco of Esquire wrote, "Episode 3 of IT: Welcome to Derry, "Now You See It," is a mostly strong episode hindered by one of the worst climaxes I've seen on television in years. Although the episode impressively spans decades and places focus on some tertiary characters while still advancing the A-plot to formalize its core group of kids, I just can't get past the atrocity of the climax."

Zach Dionne of Decider wrote, "It's not much of a hammer blow heading into the credits, but Pennywise has officially, if barely, entered the fray in his most famous form. Let the circus begin." Shawn Van Horn of Telltale TV gave the episode a 3.2 star rating out of 5 and wrote, "This episode of It: Welcome to Derry is a satisfying watch thanks to Leroy and Hallorann's operation and Shaw's hesitancy, but makes the Losers Club's situation too narratively-focused. Still though, by shining a brighter light on that connection between Shaw and Rose, it can make for a compelling element to drive the military plotline forward."

Sean T. Collins of The New York Times wrote, "Nothing in this episode rises to the level of sheer meanness and madness reached by its two predecessors. That's disappointing, but it's also to be expected. There are only so many times you can butcher adorable middle-schoolers or torment them with grotesque and abusive avatars of their dead parents before you hit a point of diminishing returns. This week's set piece, the graveyard chase, is more thrill ride than emotional endurance test, and that's fine too."
