= 29 Neibolt Street =

5th episode of the 1st season of It: Welcome to Derry

- It: Welcome to Derry episode
- The episode marked the return of Bill Skarsgård as Pennywise after six years.
- Episode no.: Season 1 Episode 5
- Directed by: Emmanuel Osei-Kuffour Jr.
- Written by: Brad Caleb Kane
- Cinematography by: Luc Montpellier; Paul Sarossy
- Editing by: Glenn Garland
- Original air date: November 23, 2025
- Running time: 56 minutes

Guest appearances
- Kimberly Norris Guerrero as Rose; Rudy Mancuso as Captain Pauly Russo; Joshua Odjick as Taniel; Sarah Thompson as Nurse; Kiawentiio as Necani

Episode chronology
← Previous "The Great Swirling Apparatus of Our Planet's Function"	Next → "In the Name of the Father"

"29 Neibolt Street" is the fifth episode of the American supernatural horror television series It: Welcome to Derry. The episode was written by co-showrunner Brad Caleb Kane and directed by Emmanuel Osei-Kuffour Jr. It was first broadcast on HBO in the United States on November 23, 2025, and also was available on HBO Max on the same date.

In the episode, the kids are shocked when a still-alive Matty returns, and they get him to take them to the location where he was imprisoned. Meanwhile, Shaw gets Leroy and Fuller to lead a raid into Neibolt Street to find the 13 pillars.

According to Nielsen Media Research, the episode was seen by an estimated 0.286 million household viewers and gained a 0.07 ratings share among adults aged 18–49. The episode received positive reviews from critics, who praised the performances, production values and Bill Skarsgård's return as Pennywise.

== Plot ==
Recovering in the hospital, Marge apologizes to Lilly for her treatment and not believing her. When she returns to the Standpipe with Ronnie, Will and Rich to discuss their next move, they are shocked to discover Matty, alive and hiding in a tent. He states that he was in the sewers, kept prisoner by a clown, and escaped while the clown slept. He also confirms Teddy and Susie died, but claims Phil might still be alive, but paralyzed.

With the information that Dick Hallorann retrieved, Shaw instructs Leroy and Fuller to supervise an operation in the house in Neibolt Street, to locate the 13 pillars. Despite Rose's protests, they intend to use Taniel as a guide through the sewers. Hallorann joins them, but is soon pulled into a vision where he finds himself in a bathroom with his grandparents. Their conversations reveal that Hallorann keeps a box in his head, and It (taking the form of his long-dead, abusive grandfather) mocks him into opening it. Meanwhile, It kills two soldiers (manifesting as a horrifying Uncle Sam), while Taniel escapes from Fuller's watch but drops the pillar Rose gave to him. After It attacks Leroy and Pauly in the form of Charlotte, they agree to shoot anything that seems out of place.

Lilly, Ronnie, Will, Rich, Marge, and Matty enter the sewers, taking some of Lilly's mother's Valium to keep the fear at bay. As they reach a dead-end, they discover the corpses of Teddy, Susie, Phil, and Matty. The entity, which had been masquerading as Matty the entire time, transforms into Pennywise, and chases the kids through the sewers. The kids cross paths with Leroy and Pauly, but Leroy believes this to be It in disguise. He shoots at Will, but Pauly steps in front of him and is severely wounded. Pauly asks Leroy to "make it count", before succumbing to his wound.

Lilly gets lost in the sewer and is confronted by the clown, who takes her father's form. As it charges towards her, an orange light flickers in the water, forcing the clown to retreat. Lilly inspects the light, finding that it is the pillar Taniel dropped. Hank is transported to Shawshank State Prison, but when the bus crashes, he seizes the opportunity to escape. He convinces Ingrid, the woman with whom he had an affair, to help him hide. Hallorann emerges from the sewers and is shocked to see a dead Pauly walking, revealing that the box has been opened.

== Production ==
=== Development ===
The episode was written by co-showrunner Brad Caleb Kane and directed by Emmanuel Osei-Kuffour Jr. It marked Kane's first writing credit, and Osei-Kuffour Jr.'s first directing credit.

=== Casting ===
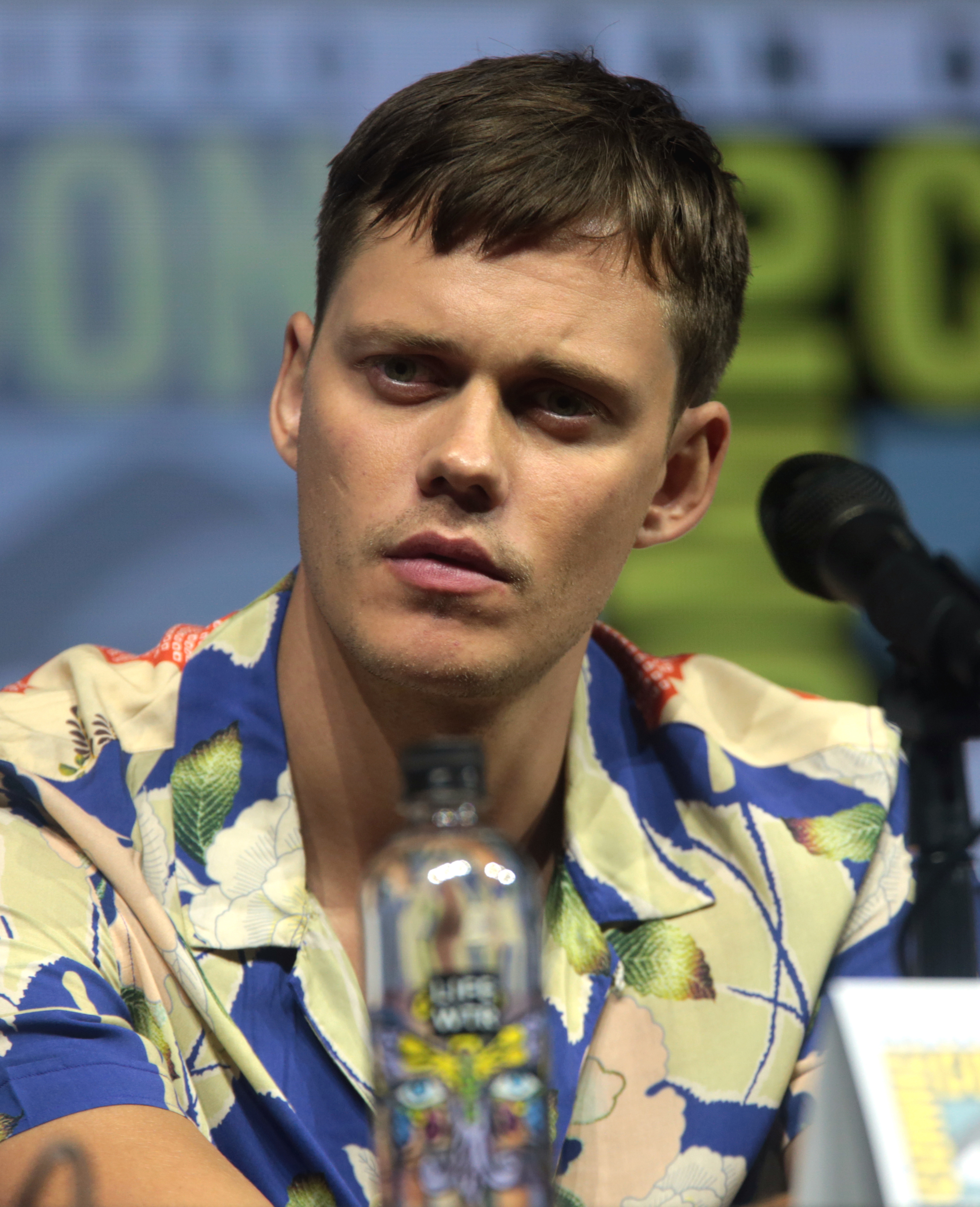
Bill Skarsgård reprises his role as Pennywise 6 years after the films in the episode.

The episode features the return of Bill Skarsgård as Pennywise, having portrayed him in the films. Previously, executive producer Andy Muschietti said that the crew used a "less is more" mentality to justify his absence, "The idea behind the delayed appearance is the build up of expectation. The audience doesn't know that they want it, but I think it creates a very special feeling. When and where the clown is going to appear was a game that I wanted to play with the audience".

Co-showrunner Jason Fuchs says that they had to properly know when Pennywise would be back, as they established he would not be seen in the beginning: "a huge part of the creative process was, 'When do we introduce this character in the context of this story?' It really was a function, ultimately, of the story and the characters dictating it". Executive producer Barbara Muschietti compared him to the shark's presence in Jaws (1975): "You don't want to have him on screen too much, because familiarity is the enemy. Pennywise is all about unpredictability, and if people get too comfortable with him, then It loses its power".

Fuchs also revealed that the episode's plot twist, wherein Matty is actually dead and serving as a vessel for Pennywise, was originally intended to happen in It Chapter Two (2019). It revolved around Mike Hanlon leading the protagonists to the sewers, where he exposes himself as Pennywise. The idea was scrapped as it deviated heavily from Stephen King's original It (1986) novel, but they revisited it for the series: "I remember us talking and going, 'Wait, this is an idea that might actually have found its time and its moment.' Matty as the guide, Matty in that context, makes a lot more sense".

Sarah Thompson, the wife of co-showrunner and episode writer Brad Caleb Kane, appears in a cameo appearance as the school nurse.

== Reception ==
=== Viewers ===
In the original American broadcast, "29 Neibolt Street" was seen by an estimated 0.286 million household viewers with a 0.07 in the 18–49 demographics. This means that 0.07 percent of all households with televisions watched the episode. This was even in viewership from the previous episode, which was seen by an estimated 0.286 million household viewers with a 0.07 in the 18–49 demographics.

=== Critical reviews ===
"29 Neibolt Street" earned positive reviews from critics. Tom Jorgensen of IGN gave the episode a "great" 8 out of 10 rating and wrote in his verdict, "'29 Neibolt Street' sends its characters into the sewers beneath Derry, and Bill Skarsgård floats with ease right back into his most iconic role to date to greet (and eat) them throughout the episode's strong second half. IT: Welcome to Derry is signaling more and more that it's heading towards a climax that will lean on remixed King mythology to escalate the terror, and though not all that setup is clicking in at this point, there are more than enough intriguing loose threads highlighted here for the last three episodes to tie together into something that both honors and iterates on Pennywise's history in Derry."

Louis Peitzman of Vulture gave the episode a 4 star rating out of 5 and wrote, "It took a minute (four hour-long episodes, to be exact), but it finally feels like Welcome to Derry is going somewhere. It's not just the arrival of Pennywise in his familiar clown form — though it is a relief to see him after all the heavy teasing. It's more the sense that the storylines are coming together in a way that gives the plot forward momentum." Shawn Van Horn of Collider gave the episode an 8 out of 10 rating and wrote, "Dick Hallorann had a shadowy encounter with it in the third episode, and we got a faraway shot in Episode 4, but now the moment you've been waiting for has arrived. Pennwyise [sic] is here, and no one is safe."

Eric Francisco of Esquire wrote, "'Neibolt Street' isn't a blockbuster episode, even if it marks the official return of Skarsgård's Pennywise. But it's brimming with interesting odds and ends." Chris Gallardo of Telltale TV gave the episode a 4 star rating out of 5 and wrote, "It: Welcome to Derry Season 1 Episode 5 is a true welcome for Pennywise's grand return all while finally connecting the storylines together in a satisfying, if stuffed, way. With its conclusion presenting huge questions about Hallorann's powers and the MacGuffin to stop It, these last three episodes hold much more potential now."

Sean T. Collins of The New York Times wrote, "As much as Gen. Shaw wants to believe otherwise, sending fully armed troops rolling down American streets to storm houses is a cure worse than any disease it purports to treat. Some problems can't be fixed with boots and guns. If you try, you'll only hurt the country you're claiming to save."

In a negative review, William Hughes of The A.V. Club gave the episode a "C–" grade and wrote, "Outside of a typically good performance from Chris Chalk (who literally gets sucked into a whole different TV show for the back half of this installment), this is Welcome To Derry at its least thoughtful, and, consequently, its least scary. The best you can hope for through most of this is to enjoy the camp, and that's a real waste of what Welcome To Derry can do."
