= Winter Fire =

- It: Welcome to Derry episode
- Episode no.: Episode 8
- Directed by: Andy Muschietti
- Written by: Jason Fuchs
- Cinematography by: Daniel Vilar
- Editing by: Glenn Garland
- Original air date: December 14, 2025
- Running time: 68 minutes

Guest appearances
- Kimberly Guerrero as Rose; Joshua Odjick as Taniel; Sophia Lillis as Beverly Marsh; Andoni Gracia as Rich's Father; Alixandra Fuchs as Terri Bainbridge

Episode chronology
← Previous "The Black Spot"	Next → "A Story of Derry"

"Winter Fire" is the eighth episode and first season finale of the American supernatural horror television series It: Welcome to Derry. The episode was written by series developer Jason Fuchs, and directed by executive producer Andy Muschietti. It was first broadcast on HBO in the United States on December 14, 2025, and also was available on HBO Max on the same date.

In the episode, Lilly, Ronnie and Marge try to save Will and others when Pennywise makes one last stand, while Leroy and Hallorann try to find a dagger that could help them neutralize Pennywise.

The episode received generally positive reviews from critics, who praised the performances, Muschietti's direction, tension, production values, and closure to the season's storylines.

== Plot ==
A large fog emerges over Derry, scaring the townsfolk. The students from Derry High School are summoned to the gym for an assembly, where the principal's corpse is revealed to be puppeteered by Pennywise, who decapitates the corpse in front of the students. Subsequently, Pennywise shows them the deadlights and takes them to It's lair.

Lilly, Ronnie and Marge discover missing people papers, realizing that all the students had disappeared, including Will. They are forced to follow a blood trail by having Marge drive an abandoned milk truck. Leroy is called by Pennywise, who taunts that he has Will kidnapped. He approaches Dick Hallorann, who tries to commit suicide as he is now haunted by spirits, and convinces him to help. They visit Rose, who explains that they need the dagger that the natives created to replace the destroyed pillar. Hallorann uses his powers to locate the dagger, which Lilly is carrying. They leave to find the students, with Rose warning that the dagger will try to break a person's mind in order to return to its place of origin, It's lair.

Upon reaching the Penobscot River, now frozen over, the girls are tormented by Pennywise. It mocks Marge by showing her a missing person pamphlet of her future son, Richie Tozier. Pennywise reveals that It experiences the past, present, and future all at once, meaning that It's death may also be It's birth. Before It can kill Marge, Hallorann freezes It by mentally trapping Pennywise in a false memory as the human Bob Gray, causing the students, including Will, to regain consciousness. The adults arrive, with Leroy and Taniel trying to take the dagger to an ancient tree that marks the end of the pillars' range of influence. However, they are attacked by Shaw and his troops, resulting in Taniel getting killed. Leroy gets Will to take the dagger and bury it below the tree, but the dagger itself makes it difficult by being drawn the opposite direction, toward It's lair. Hallorann tries to trick Pennywise into staying in his mind, but Pennywise discovers the scheme and escapes. When Pennywise unfreezes, Shaw tries to control It by claiming It is free, but Pennywise recognizes Shaw from his childhood, and after frightening Shaw with the form of the one-eyed carnival man, It ultimately devours him.

Pennywise races to stop the kids from reaching the tree, as It is constantly shot by Leroy. As Pennywise makes one last effort, the dagger's power is too strong for the kids to plunge it. Suddenly, the spirit of Rich emerges and helps them succeed in planting the dagger under the tree. Pennywise deforms into the Deadlights and returns to hibernation.

Some time later, Marge delivers a eulogy at Rich's funeral, while Hallorann sees Rich's spirit with his attending parents, comforting them. Lilly finally takes the courage to visit her father's grave. Marge confides in Lilly that Pennywise told her that her future son and friends would kill It, but the creature's omnipresent nature makes her wonder if It can go back in time to kill their ancestors; Lilly responds if it were true, then someone else would have to do something about it. Hallorann parts ways with Leroy, planning to take a job as a cook at a hotel in London. Leroy is honorably discharged and released without charges, as long as he stays silent over the events, and he decides to stay in Derry to prevent anyone else from exploiting It. Rose decides to leave Derry, giving her farm to Leroy. Will and Ronnie share a kiss before the latter leaves Derry with her father.

Ingrid is interned at Juniper Hill, where she is relaxed by the music. 26 years later, in October 1988, an old Ingrid finds that a patient, Elfrida Marsh, committed suicide. She consoles Elfrida's grieving daughter, Beverly, telling her that no one really dies in Derry.

== Production ==
=== Development ===
The episode was written by co-showrunner Jason Fuchs, and directed by executive producer Andy Muschietti. It marked Fuchs' fourth writing credit, and Muschietti's third directorial credit.

=== Writing ===
Andy Muschietti explained that their first pitch to Stephen King was telling the story backwards, as "it has to do with how Pennywise experiences time in a non-linear way." As such, he hoped that this could convince skeptical viewers in watching the series, "Given that it's a prequel, and that people normally with prequels are like, 'Oh, okay, so why should I watch that if we know that the monster dies at the end?' Well, not if he can rewrite history, right?"

The episode includes a reference to Richie Tozier, revealing that he is the future son of Marge. Jason Fuchs said that this "ties in with the mystery that Andy has been hinting at, which is why we're telling this story in reverse... The seeds of that are sewn in that specific moment when It reveals to Marge and to the audience that it knows exactly where this story is going, which raises questions certainly about where our story is going." He further added, "If you know the material and you know story geometry, you know that person has to live and that person has to die and that name is a little similar to that."

While the episode uses a fog as an element, the crew stated that this was not a reference to King's novella The Mist, with Muschietti saying "There's a lot of stuff that we invented for the show, but from our first conversations with Stephen King, he was on board with us creating a lot." He added, "It has its own logic. You see it in episode 4 at the end when Taniel is telling the story and we see how the asteroid hits the Earth. After the explosion, we see the Deadlights are basically surrounded by this smokey fog that trails back. We decided to make that the language of It's expansion."

=== Casting ===
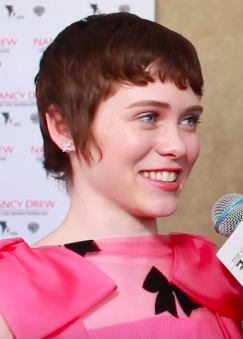
Sophia Lillis reprises her role as Beverly Marsh from the films.

The episode's final scene features a cameo appearance by Sophia Lillis, reprising her role as Beverly Marsh from the films. Muschietti said that "it was important for me to make a stronger connection to the movies" by showing more characters in the series. He also said that Lillis' appearance was "a last-minute idea." He also added, "We always joke that Sophia Lillis always looks the same. She looked 14 when she was 14 and now that she's 24, she still looks 14, so we could bring her back without having to de-age her."

The mid-credits scene was filmed in April 2025. It marked the final acting role of Joan Gregson, the actress playing old Ingrid, who died in June 2025.

== Reception ==
"Winter Fire" earned generally positive reviews from critics. Tom Jorgensen of IGN gave the episode a "good" 7 out of 10 rating and wrote in his verdict, "It: Welcome to Derry's first season saves its biggest, weirdest swings for last. Pennywise's march across the Penobscot, and the race to stop him, provide a good throughline for the finale, even if the military motivations that underpin this conflict completely fall apart. The emotional beats do land, though, with the characters that make it to the end getting satisfying conclusions to their arcs. Fascinatingly, Welcome to Derry seems keen to really get creative with the entire history of It – backwards and forwards – in future seasons, and the groundwork laid for that in “Winter Fire” is interesting if a little hastily explained."

William Hughes of The A.V. Club gave the episode a "C" grade and wrote, "A crew of talented performers, and some genuinely stomach-turning effects shots, have worked overtime to give the series an energy it otherwise might have failed to possess. But a lot of that spark, if I'm being honest, seemed to desert the series once it had Skarsgård to fall back on for a more rote, if charismatic, flavor of menace. And if this is all Muschietti and his fellow writers and directors could think to do with this fantastic creation, in this rich an era of American history, then my vote is obvious after eight episodes of disappointed hopes: Down, I say, with the clown."

Louis Peitzman of Vulture gave the episode a 3 star rating out of 5 and wrote, "Knowing that Pennywise couldn't be defeated outright made the finale a big question mark: How do you end a season in a satisfying way when your hands are tied? To its credit, Welcome to Derry does a decent job of landing the plane, but as with so many components of the preceding seven episodes, “Winter Fire” is best enjoyed without thinking too hard about it."

Zach Dionne of Decider wrote, "" Shawn Van Horn of Collider gave the episode a 8 out of 10 rating and wrote, "In the first season finale, "Winter Fire," IT: Welcome to Derry brings one timeline to a close, only to open the door to more."

Eric Francisco of Esquire wrote, "“Winter Fire,” the eighth and final episode of IT: Welcome to Derry's (mostly) spectacular first season, is a satisfying send-off to a place we can't leave fast enough. It's wall-to-wall action and heart-wrenching drama as the Derry residents who know better mobilize to stop Pennywise from those who don't know what's happening at all." Chris Gallardo of Telltale TV gave the episode a 4 star rating out of 5 and wrote, "It: Welcome to Derry Season 1 Episode 8 is a satisfying ending that confidently wraps up its intertwining storylines through its final fiery confrontation with Pennywise. While it does leave room to explore Derry's past and Pennywise's time-travelling, this chapter closes on a high note despite its shaky run."

Sean T. Collins of The New York Times wrote, "This fluid approach to the movies' continuity is part of what makes this show such a surprise. It: Welcome to Derry feels like a mulligan for Muschietti, who directed them. The first film's haunted-hayride vibe, the second's nonsensical plot and warmed-over, quip-heavy dialogue: All of that has been jettisoned. In their place stands a season-long testament to the power of cruelty in art." Ben Sherlock of Screen Rant wrote, "After delivering a perfectly executed set-piece with the fire at the Black Spot last week, this final battle feels messy and unfocused. But on the whole, It: Welcome to Derry has been an exciting new addition to the franchise and a promising first chapter of what will surely be an epic horror saga."
