= The Pilot (It: Welcome to Derry) =

1st episode of the 1st season of It: Welcome to Derry

- It: Welcome to Derry episode
- Episode no.: Season 1 Episode 1
- Directed by: Andy Muschietti
- Written by: Jason Fuchs
- Cinematography by: Daniel Vilar
- Editing by: Esther Sokolow
- Original air date: October 26, 2025
- Running time: 53 minutes

Guest appearances
- Rudy Mancuso as Captain Pauly Russo; Alixandra Fuchs as Terri Bainbridge

Episode chronology
← Previous —	Next → "The Thing in the Dark"

"The Pilot" is the series premiere of the American supernatural horror television series It: Welcome to Derry. The episode was written by series developer Jason Fuchs, and directed by executive producer Andy Muschietti. It was first broadcast on HBO in the United States on October 26, 2025, and also was available on HBO Max on the same date.

The season is set in Derry, Maine in 1962. After the disappearance of a boy, three high school friends get involved in trying to find him, while two Air Force members arrive at the town to command a B-52.

According to Nielsen Media Research, the episode was seen by an estimated 0.334 million household viewers and gained a 0.10 ratings share among adults aged 18–49. The series premiere received a mostly positive response from critics, who praised its production values, Muschetti's direction, atmosphere, opening sequence, and twist ending, although some were divided over the over-abundance of characters.

== Plot ==
On January 4, 1962 in Derry, Maine, a young boy named Matty Clements escapes from a movie theater after the usher catches him without a ticket. On the outskirts of the city, he is picked up by a family. The father and mother ask Matty where they should drop him off, to where Matty replies, "Anywhere but Derry." However, he becomes unnerved by the family's increasingly strange behavior, and is further confused when they re-enter Derry. The wife suddenly gives birth to a monstrous winged baby, who attacks Matty.

Four months later, Air Force and Korean War veterans Captain Pauly Russo and Major Leroy Hanlon arrive at the Derry Air Force Base, a Strategic Air Command base. General Francis Shaw has assigned Leroy to pilot a B-52, although Leroy experiences racial discrimination from Masters, one of his airmen. Back at the local high school, Teddy Uris remains haunted over Matty's disappearance, while his friend Phil Malkin tries to get Teddy to move on. Lilly Bainbridge, a friend of Matty's, is still mourning the loss of her father, who died tragically in a pickle jarring factory accident one year earlier. While preparing to take a bath at her house, Lilly is shocked to hear Matty's voice coming from the drain of the bathtub, specifically singing "Ya Got Trouble" from The Music Man, the film that Matty snuck into the night of his disappearance. When she shares this with Teddy and Phil, they struggle to believe it.

Later that night, Teddy has Shabbat dinner with his Jewish family and asks his father about the possibility of children being held underground for a long period of time. His father then discusses Teddy's grandparents escape from the Buchenwald concentration camp, where the rest of their families died, and atrocities that included making lamp shades out of human skin. Before bed, Teddy's lampshade begins malfunctioning, and eventually shows many human faces to scare him.

The following day, Teddy, Phil and Lilly investigate Matty's disappearance at the local library. They read in a news article that Matty was last seen by a girl, who they deduce is Veronica "Ronnie" Grogan. When the kids show up outside Ronnie's house to ask for help, Ronnie initially refuses to assist them, but soon changes her mind when Lilly mentions that she heard Matty singing through the pipes. Ronnie claims to have heard voices as well, in the pipes of the local theater where she works with her father. Back at the Air Command base, Leroy is attacked in his bed by three masked men, who demand the specifications to pilot the B-52. He refuses to leak the information and fights back with the help of Pauly, who enters the bedroom in the middle of the fight. The masked men eventually leave the room in a hurry.

Teddy, Phil, Lilly, Ronnie and Phil's sister Susie sneak into the movie theater, where Ronnie projects The Music Man. They recognize the song, and are surprised to see Matty in the film. Matty speaks directly to them, blaming them for his situation before unleashing the winged baby at them. The creature grows and pursues the kids. Teddy and Phil are brutally killed by the baby, and Lilly is unable to save Susie from the same fate. Ronnie barely manages to get Lilly out of the screening, and Lilly screams in horror once she realizes she's carrying Susie's severed hand.

== Production ==
=== Development ===
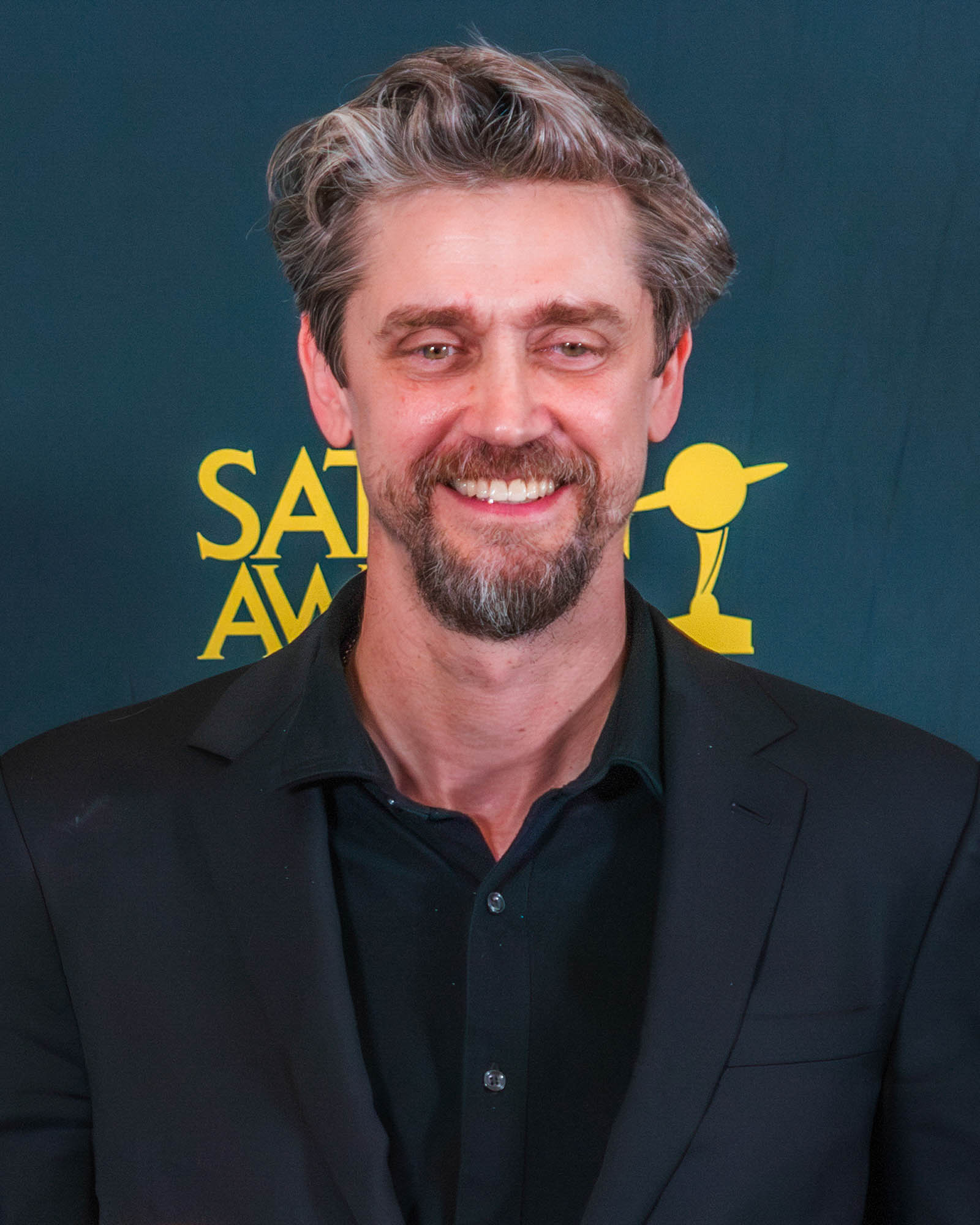
Andy Muschietti, director of the films, returned to direct the episode.

The episode was written by series developer Jason Fuchs, and directed by executive producer Andy Muschietti.

=== Writing ===
Despite Bill Skarsgård confirmed to reprise his role as Pennywise, he does not make an appearance in the episode. Fuchs said that for this and to convince him to reprise the role, they needed new versions of the character, "We knew that we had to create something special just to have Bill come back and play Pennywise, we had to give Pennywise new dimensions. We had to integrate him in a story that felt fitting to this new younger Pennywise. We wanted to show how Pennywise became, or took on the avatar of Pennywise". Muschietti also said that the crew used a "less is more" mentality to justify his absence, "The idea behind the delayed appearance is the build up of expectation. The audience doesn't know that they want it, but I think it creates a very special feeling. When and where the clown is going to appear was a game that I wanted to play with the audience".

The episode ends with Pennywise using its powers to kill Teddy, Phil and Susie. Muschietti said that this was done to prove that "in this world, no one will be safe". Barbara Muschietti also added, "It was important for us to tell a very unpredictable story, because we couldn't repeat the movies. We needed the kids, because there's no It without kids, and we needed them to become friends and fight this monster together. But we needed to subvert the story somehow".

=== Filming ===
The opening sequence followed Matty picked up by a family, when a woman gives birth to a winged creature that attacks him. Muschietti commented on the scene's inclusion, "We knew we needed to catch the audience's attention, and establish a world where nothing is safe. We needed a big inciting event and the disappearance of Matty is how we started putting the pieces together". Daryl Sawchuk, the series' VFX supervisor, commented, "We had a lot of fantastic practical goo and blood and all sorts of stuff that we used as a starting point and then expanded upon when we got into post".

== Reception ==
=== Viewers ===
In its original American broadcast, "The Pilot" was seen by an estimated 0.334 million household viewers with a 0.10 in the 18–49 demographics. This means that 0.10 percent of all households with televisions watched the episode.

=== Critical reviews ===
"The Pilot" earned mostly positive reviews from critics. Tom Jorgensen of IGN gave the episode a "great" 8 out of 10 rating and wrote in his verdict, "IT: Welcome to Derry's premiere makes you feel right at home in America's worst small town. The first episode accomplishes its most important task of re-establishing Derry and Pennywise with style and some expertly-drawn out tension, though some of the more CG-heavy scares fall flat. Indirectly honoring a popular critique of the novel, the kids' side of the story is (so far) way more compelling than the adults', but Pennywise has barely begun to poke his red-tufted head out of the sewer, so there's plenty of time for that storyline to start floating. We all float down here, after all."

William Hughes of The A.V. Club gave the episode a "C" grade and wrote, "If Welcome To Derry is going to be something more than 'IT in eight episodes instead of two movies'—and there is some suggestion, with that ruthless ending, that that's the intended goal — it's going to need a level of focus that's lacking here. As is, we've got some effective scares, but acting, and especially writing, that can't live up to the series' pedigree."

Louis Peitzman of Vulture gave the episode a 4 star rating out of 5 and wrote, "With the sudden reveal that most of these kids aren't our heroes after all, Welcome to Derry delivers a stunning bait and switch. Ronnie and Lilly, the latter still clutching Susie's severed arm, appear to be the only two to make it out of the theater alive."

Meghan McCluskey of TIME wrote, "The final moments of the episode, which was directed by Muschietti, were both gruesome and shocking. They also seemed to signal that whatever Welcome to Derry has up its sleeve in the next seven episodes, the showrunners don't want viewers to feel like they're just getting a rehash of the IT movies — or, maybe more importantly, that they have any idea what's coming next."

Eric Francisco of Esquire wrote, "This is still Derry, Maine as seen in those movies, where a nostalgic Americana hides all of its cruelty beneath a veneer of politeness. Handsome production design and muscular sequences of trauma-inducing terror were the markers of Muschietti's films, and it's thrilling to see more of that in the first episode of Welcome to Derry." Zach Dionne of Decider wrote, "Turns out Welcome to Derry was right to give it a go, because this four-minute sequence is the most disturbing part of the premiere."

Sean T. Collins of The New York Times wrote, "The marvelous thing about this horrifying episode is how little it depends on your knowledge of the source material to convey its message. Welcome to Derry is making a point the movies largely missed: It is about the unique vulnerability of children to violence and hatred. The creative team deserves enormous credit for taking the risk of alienating the audience with material this difficult to watch, made even more difficult by the truly ghastly sound and creature design."
