= Muschietti =

Muschietti is an Italian surname. Notable people with the surname include:

- Andy Muschietti (born 1973), Argentine filmmaker
- Barbara Muschietti (born 1971), Argentine film producer and screenwriter, and Andy's older sister
