= Odjick =

Odjick is a surname. Notable people with the surname include:

- Gino Odjick (1970–2023), Canadian ice hockey player
- Joshua Odjick, Canadian actor
