= Pedro Pan (film) =

- Directed by: Richie Adams
- Screenplay by: Richie Adams; Bart Gavigan
- Story by: Carlos José Alvarez
- Based on: Operation Pedro Pan
- Produced by: Steve Shapiro; Carlos José Alvarez; Ken Whitney; Richie Adams
- Starring: Néstor Carbonell; Allen Leech; Danny Pino; Paz Vega; Andy Garcia; Annabelle Wallis; Yara Martinez; Héctor Medina; Yul Vazquez; Tessie Santiago; Tony Plana; Carlos Gomez; Selenis Leyva; Arian Cartaya; Garret Dillahunt
- Music by: Carlos José Alvarez
- Production company: At Speed Pictures
- Country: United States
- Language: English

Pedro Pan is an upcoming American historical drama film directed by Richie Adams. Adams also wrote the screenplay with Bart Gavigan from a story by composer Carlos José Alvarez. The film is based on Operation Pedro Pan, where Cuban parents sent their children to the United States to escape the Castro regime. The film stars Néstor Carbonell, Allen Leech, Danny Pino, Paz Vega, and Andy Garcia.

== Cast ==
- Néstor Carbonell
- Allen Leech
- Danny Pino
- Paz Vega
- Andy Garcia
- Annabelle Wallis
- Lenora May
- Yara Martinez
- Héctor Medina
- Yul Vazquez
- Tessie Santiago
- Tony Plana
- Carlos Gomez
- Selenis Leyva
- Arian Cartaya
- Angeline De Jesus
- Garret Dillahunt
- Jake Inman
- Glen Halliday

== Production ==
Carlos José Alvarez wrote the story for a film based on Operation Pedro Pan, which was further developed to a full screenplay by Bart Gavigan and Richie Adams, the latter of whom would also direct the film. The project was first reported in October 2025, and the cast included Néstor Carbonell, Allen Leech, Danny Pino, Paz Vega, and Andy García. Annabelle Wallis and Yara Martinez had joined the cast that same month as well. Additional casting announced while in production included Héctor Medina, Yul Vazquez, Tony Plana, Carlos Gomez, Selenis Leyva, Arian Cartaya, and Garret Dillahunt.

Principal photography began in November 2025 in Mexico. Businesses in Mérida, Yucatán underwent location dressing to serve as 1960s Havana, which included classic cars from the era.
