= Arian Cartaya =

American actor

- Born: Arian S. Cartaya; February 14, 2013 (age 13); United States
- Occupation: Actor
- Years active: 2021–present
- Agent: DDO Artists Agency
- Works: Juego de mentiras; It: Welcome to Derry

Arian S. Cartaya is an American actor known for his work as Ricardo "Rich" Santos in the supernatural horror series It: Welcome to Derry.

== Personal life ==
Cartaya is from the United States and has Cuban heritage. His first language is Spanish, and he continues to only speak Spanish in his home. His favorite food is Cuban food, his favorite artist is Bad Bunny, he has two cats, and he likes to do back squats as his workout.

== Career ==
He began acting in 2021 by appearing in the short film Un Pequeño Corte. He was also part of the family comedy series Gordita Chronicles in 2022 as his first significant role, then appeared in multiple episodes of Juego de mentiras and in the short film Birdhouse in 2023. His big break came when he was cast and made an appearance in It: Welcome to Derry in late 2025.

== Filmography ==
=== Film ===
Key
†	Denotes films that have not yet been released

Year	Title	Role	Ref!
TBA	Pedro Pan †	TBA	
TBA	Porto Rico †	TBA	

=== Television ===
Year	Title	Role	Ref!
2022	Gordita Chronicles	Álvaro	
2023	Juego de mentiras	Miguel	
2024	Bad Monkey	Sam O'Peele	
2025	It: Welcome to Derry	Ricardo "Rich" Santos	

=== Short films ===
Year	Title	Role	Ref
2021	Un Pequeño Corte	Mean Boy	
2023	Birdhouse	Juan	
