= It – Welcome to Derry =

American supernatural horror television series

It: Welcome to Derry
- Genre: Supernatural horror
- Based on: It by Stephen King
- Developed by: Andy Muschietti; Barbara Muschietti; Jason Fuchs
- Showrunners: Jason Fuchs; Brad Caleb Kane
- Starring: Taylour Paige; Jovan Adepo; James Remar; Stephen Rider; Matilda Lawler; Amanda Christine; Clara Stack; Blake Cameron James; Arian Cartaya; Miles Ekhardt; Mikkal Karim-Fidler; Jack Molloy Legault; Matilda Legault; Chris Chalk; Peter Outerbridge; Madeleine Stowe; Bill Skarsgård
- Music by: Benjamin Wallfisch
- Opening theme: "A Smile and a Ribbon" by Patience and Prudence
- Country of origin: United States
- Original language: English
- No. of seasons: 1
- No. of episodes: 9

Production
- Executive producers: Barbara Muschietti; Andy Muschietti; Jason Fuchs; Brad Caleb Kane; David Coatsworth; Bill Skarsgård; Dan Lin; Roy Lee; Shelley Meals
- Producers: Lyn Lucibello-Brancatella; Anna Beben
- Cinematography: Daniel Vilar; Rasmus Heise; Luc Montpellier; Paul Sarossy; Catherine Lutes
- Editors: Esther Sokolow; Matthew V. Colonna; Grant Wooldridge; Glenn Garland
- Running time: 29–66 minutes
- Production companies: Rideback; Vertigo Entertainment; FiveTen Productions; K Plus Ultra; Double Dream; Warner Bros. Television

Original release
- Network: HBO
- Release: October 26, 2025 – present

It: Welcome to Derry is an American supernatural horror television series based on Stephen King's 1986 novel It. Serving as a prequel to the films It (2017) and It Chapter Two (2019), the series was developed by Andy Muschietti, Barbara Muschietti and Jason Fuchs, all of whom were involved in the It films. The series stars a large ensemble cast including Bill Skarsgård, who serves as executive producer and reprises his role as Pennywise from the films.

Andy and Barbara Muschietti along with Fuchs began developing the series in March 2022. After receiving a production commitment later that November, Fuchs and Brad Kane were hired as showrunners, and the series was greenlit in February 2023, with Andy Muschietti, who had directed both films, attached to direct multiple episodes, including the pilot. Casting began later in April, with Skarsgård cast in May 2024. Filming for the series began in May 2023 but was halted in July due to the 2023 SAG-AFTRA strike; it concluded in August 2024.

It: Welcome to Derry premiered on HBO on October 26, 2025. The series received generally positive reviews from critics, who praised its direction, production values, title sequence, and performances (particularly from Skarsgård, Chris Chalk, and the younger cast), although the writing and visual effects received some criticism. A special prequel episode was released to HBO Max on October 31, 2026. In August 2026, the series was renewed for a second season, which is expected to premiere in late 2027 or 2028.

== Premise ==
In the first season, set in 1962, a couple with their son move to Derry, Maine, just as a young boy disappears. With their arrival, bad things begin to happen in the town.

In the second season, set in 1935 during the Great Depression, the Bradley Gang, a group of bank robbers, arrives in Derry to purchase ammunition, only to find themselves caught in a brutal massacre and confronted with terrifying horrors.

== Cast and characters ==
=== Main ===
- Taylour Paige as Charlotte Hanlon, an activist, Leroy's wife and Will's mother whose family recently moved to Derry due to Leroy's new assignment.
- Jovan Adepo as Leroy Hanlon, a US Air Force Major, Charlotte's husband and Will's father. An older Leroy was portrayed by Steven Williams in It (2017).
- James Remar as Francis Shaw, a US Air Force Lieutenant General who is Leroy's superior officer and searches for a "weapon" in hopes of ending the Cold War
  - Diesel La Torraca as young Shaw in 1908
- Stephen Rider as Hank Grogan, Ronnie's father and the projectionist at the local cinema
- Matilda Lawler as Marge Truman, a high schooler who finds herself torn between her old friendship with the unpopular Lilly and a desire to fit in with a group of more popular girls. An older Marge was portrayed by Janet Porter in It Chapter Two (2019).
- Amanda Christine as Veronica "Ronnie" Grogan, a high schooler and Hank's daughter who befriends Lilly
- Clara Stack as Lilly Bainbridge, a high schooler dealing with the death of her father and a neglectful mother, and who is both frequently bullied and infamous at school for her supposed insanity
- Blake Cameron James as Will Hanlon, a high schooler who is the son of Leroy and Charlotte and future father of Mike Hanlon, who finds it difficult to adapt to Derry
- Arian Cartaya as Rich Santos, a Cuban American high schooler who befriends Will and has a crush on Marge
- Miles Ekhardt as Matty Clements, a high schooler who disappears when Pennywise awakens
- Mikkal Karim-Fidler as Teddy Uris, a higher schooler and Phil's best friend who comes from a Jewish family
- Jack Molloy Legault as Phil Malkin, a high schooler and Teddy's best friend who is a conspiracy theorist
- Matilda Legault as Susie Malkin, Phil's younger sister
- Chris Chalk as Dick Hallorann, an Airman with telepathic and clairvoyant skills who helps the Air Force search for a "weapon". Chalk plays a younger version of the Hallorann previously portrayed by Scatman Crothers in The Shining (1980) and Carl Lumbly in Doctor Sleep (2019).
- Peter Outerbridge as Clint Bowers, Derry's corrupt police chief
- Madeleine Stowe as Ingrid Kersh / Periwinkle, the head housekeeper at Juniper Hill Asylum and Bob Gray's daughter who befriends Lilly
  - Tyner Rushing as young Ingrid in 1935
  - Emma-Leigh Cullum as child Ingrid in 1908
  - Joan Gregson as an elderly Ingrid in 1988, reprising her role from It Chapter Two. This was her final role, following her death in June 2025.
- Bill Skarsgård as Pennywise, an evil shapeshifting creature that sows chaos in Derry
  - Skarsgård also portrays Bob Gray, the original human Pennywise from 1908

=== Recurring ===
- Rudy Mancuso as Captain Pauly Russo, Leroy Hanlon's partner and best friend in the Air Force
- Alixandra Fuchs as Teresa "Terri" Bainbridge, Lilly's mother
- Thomas Mitchell as Colonel Fuller, a military colonel involved in General Shaw's mission
- Maya McNair as Patricia "Patty" Stanton, the leader of the Pattycakes, a popular group of mean girls, who play cruel pranks to be the center of attention
- Hannah Storey as Rhonda Chambers, a Pattycake and friend of Patty and Elaine
- Maya Misaljevic as Elaine Morrison, a Pattycake and friend of Patty and Rhonda
- Kimberly Guerrero as Rose, a Native American woman who owns a pawn shop and has a history with Shaw
  - Violet Sutherland as young Rose in 1908
- Joshua Odjick as Taniel, Rose's nephew
  - Tres Garcia as young Taniel
- Chad Rook as Sergeant Masters, a racist military sergeant who has tension with Leroy
- Shane Marriott as Reggie Davis, a friend of Hallorann's at the military base
- Dorian Grey as Loverboy Jax, a friend of Hallorann's at the military base
- Richard Walters as Airman Jacobs, a friend of Hallorann's at the military base
- Lazzelle Gelias as Rose Hallorann, the deceased grandmother of Dick
- Wayne Charles Baker as John, a Native American chief in Derry
- Morningstar Angeline as Sesqui, a past Native American warrior
- Kiawentiio as Necani, Sesqui's daughter
- Larry Day as Stanley "Stan" Kersh, the local butcher and Ingrid's husband
- Lindsay Merrithew as Tibbs, Derry's councilman
- Peter Deiwick as Al Malkin, Phil and Susie's father

=== Guest ===
- Finley Burke as Dan Uris, Teddy's brother and future father of Stan Uris. An older Dan was portrayed by Ari Cohen in It.
- Audrey Wellington as Arlene, a teenage girl who is in the car that picks up Matty
- Lochlan Ray Miller as Ray, a child who is in the car that picks up Matty
- Robert Clarke as Dunleavy, Derry's High School principal
- BJ Harrison as Louella Grogan, Ronnie's grandmother and Hank's mother
- Ryan J. O'Callaghan as Mr. Keene, a young pharmacist. An older Keene was portrayed by Joe Bostick in It and It Chapter Two.
- Andrew Moodie as Andy Hallorann, the deceased abusive grandfather of Hallorann
- Isabel Deroy-Olson as Kino, a past Native American girl
- Michael Podemski as Maneese, a past Native American boy
- Moni Ogunsuyi as Noreen, Loverboy Jax's date
- Madeleine Cox as Mabel, a Juniper Hill patient who encounters Pennywise in 1935
- Andoni Gracia as Mr. Santos, Rich's father
- Sophia Lillis as Beverly Marsh, a teenage girl and future member of the Losers' Club, reprising her role from It and It Chapter Two.
- Zahn McClarnon as Mitig, a past Native American warrior

== Episodes ==
Season	Episodes	Originally released	
Season	Episodes	First released	Last released
1	8	October 26, 2025	December 14, 2025
Special		October 31, 2026	

=== Season 1 (2025) ===
No. overall	No. in season	Title	Directed by	Written by	Original release date	U.S. viewers (millions)
1	1	"The Pilot"	Andy Muschietti	Jason Fuchs	October 26, 2025	0.334
In 1962, Matty Clements begs a family to take him out of Derry, but their behavior grows disturbingly strange until the mother gives birth to a mutant baby that attacks him. Four months later, Major Leroy Hanlon arrives at the Derry base and faces a racist incident. Meanwhile, Lilly Bainbridge has a terrifying vision of Matty singing with bloody fingers. Her friend Marge Truman, Teddy Uris, and Phil Malkin dismiss her, until Teddy also suffers a horrific hallucination of a human lampshade. Investigating Matty's disappearance, the group meets Ronnie Grogan, who reveals she has also heard children singing the same eerie song in the sewers. Leroy survives an ambush with the help of his partner and friend Pauly Russo. Lilly, Ronnie, Teddy, Phil and his sister Susie search for answers at a movie theater. There, a film shows Matty accusing them before unleashing the mutant baby, which kills everyone except Lilly, whom Ronnie manages to save.
2	2	"The Thing in the Dark"	Andy Muschietti	Austin Guzman	November 2, 2025 (Note: The second episode was released online on HBO's streaming service on October 31, to coincide with Halloween, and was released on normal broadcast television on November 2.)	0.155
The police investigate Ronnie's father, Hank, suspecting him of the children's murders. Leroy believes the attack was the work of Soviet spies, while racist Sergeant Masters is imprisoned for it. Charlotte tries to stop a fight in Derry, with adults glaring at her. Ronnie experiences a vision of her dead mother. The army searches for something in the woods with Dick Hallorann, observed by Native Americans. Ronnie tells Lilly about her vision, and they discuss the story Lilly gave the police. Will, Leroy's son, struggles to fit in but befriends Ronnie and Cuban American Rich Santos. Chief Clint Bowers blackmails Lilly, and Hank is arrested, prompting Ronnie to confront her. Leroy later clears Masters, and General Francis Shaw reveals he staged the attack to test Leroy's fear, explaining that only Leroy can retrieve a "weapon" that inspires overwhelming fear. After another vision, Lilly returns to Juniper Hill. Meanwhile, the army discovers a car filled with corpses, which is a beacon to locate the weapon.
3	3	"Now You See It"	Andrew Bernstein	Guadalís Del Carmen & Gabe Hobson	November 9, 2025	0.279
In 1908, a young Shaw is pursued by a terrifying man until Rose, a Native American girl, rescues him and explains what the creature is; the two grow close and spend the entire summer together before Shaw leaves Derry. In the present, Lilly is discharged from Juniper Hill and teams up with Ronnie to gather visual evidence to clear Hank's name. After finding nothing useful in the car, Shaw sends Hallorann to use his psychic abilities, triggering visions of soldiers dying in war and bodies drifting before Leroy pulls him back from falling out of the helicopter. Shaw later confronts Rose at her pawn shop about her cease-and-desist letter, hiding the true purpose of the excavations. Meanwhile, Lilly and Ronnie recruit Will and Rich, who claim the entity is an evil orisha, and the group attempts a summoning ritual in a cemetery. When Rich admits he isn't sure it will work, they leave, only to be chased by visions of Teddy and Susie's spirits. They manage to escape and capture several photos, one revealing a clown.
4	4	"The Great Swirling Apparatus of Our Planet's Function"	Andrew Bernstein	Helen Shang	November 16, 2025	0.286
The group brings their photos to Bowers, but the spirits no longer appear. Leroy takes Will fishing, where Will has a vision that tells him that he will die in flames; (Note: As explained by Mike Hanlon in It (2017)) Leroy pulls him out and sees that his son has scratches and cuts on his arms. Will warns that there is something evil in Derry. Later he theorizes with his friends that this evil feeds on fear. Charlotte visits Hank, who admits he was having an affair with a married white woman that night. Marge attempts to prank Lilly but is overwhelmed by a vision in which her eyes burst, injuring one before Lilly intervenes. Will then sees a clown staring at him from his window, and Leroy finds a red balloon when he goes outside. Meanwhile, Hallorann enters the mind of Taniel, Rose's nephew, and learns the entity's origins, whom the natives call "Tha Gallo", and how it grew stronger every time he killed until the natives imprisoned it beneath what would later become Derry. Taniel finally reveals that the entity is in the Neibolt Street house.
5	5	"29 Neibolt Street"	Emmanuel Osei-Kuffour Jr.	Brad Caleb Kane	November 23, 2025	0.286
Shaw tells Leroy he plans to seize the pillars that contain the entity so they can control it. The kids find Matty at their meeting spot, and he reveals Phil is alive. The Native Americans warn that, as always when the entity wakes, a deadly act will occur before it returns to sleep for 27 years. Rose urges Shaw to stop pursuing it, but he refuses. Hank is sent to Shawshank, but the bus crashes and he escapes. The kids, joined by Matty and newcomer Marge, enter the sewers to find Phil and take Lilly's Diazepam, only to become drugged. The army enters with Taniel, but the mission goes awry. The kids discover their friends' bodies just as Matty turns into Pennywise, forcing them to flee. Leroy and Pauly encounter them; Leroy fires, thinking they are illusions, but Pauly intervenes, realizing they are real, and is killed. Pennywise nearly eats Lilly, but the pillar stops him, forcing him to retreat. Hank finds his affair, Ingrid, and tells her how to help him, and she goes to Charlotte. Hallorann emerges from the sewers and sees a dead Pauly.
6	6	"In the Name of the Father"	Jamie Travis	Jason Fuchs & Cord Jefferson & Brad Caleb Kane	November 30, 2025	0.316
Leroy scolds Will for going into the sewers and orders him to stay at the base, but Will refuses, leading Leroy to lose control and slap him. Lilly shows the group the pillar that saved her and insists on returning to destroy the entity; Ronnie argues fiercely with her. Hank hides in the Black Spot until Charlotte can get him out of Derry, which frustrates Hallorann. When Leroy suggests using Hallorann's enhanced gift to locate the pillars, Hallorann becomes furious. Marge confronts her old friend group, the Pattycakes, while growing closer to Rich. Lilly discovers that Ingrid was the clown the group saw, as she was searching for her missing father, the original Pennywise. Ingrid reveals she saw "Pennywise" disguised as her father kill a little girl at Juniper Hill in 1935, and accepted that the entity became her father. She pushes Lilly to accept it and go with her, claiming the entity can become her dead father, but Lilly flees. Meanwhile, the demoted Bowers receives a tip about Hank's whereabouts and leads a group of armed and masked white men to the Black Spot.
7	7	"The Black Spot"	Andy Muschietti	Jason Fuchs & Brad Caleb Kane	December 7, 2025	0.305
In 1908, Bob Gray, Ingrid's father and Pennywise's performer, is lured into the woods by the entity disguised as a child and never returns. In the present, Bowers' mob arrives at the Black Spot demanding Hank, and when the patrons refuse, they set the building on fire. Hallorann saves Hank, Ronnie, and Will, while Rich dies protecting Marge, who survives. Ingrid, in her Periwinkle costume, arrives as Pennywise kills her husband Stan after feeding on the victims; realizing he is not her father, Pennywise shows her the deadlights, leaving her catatonic. Marge and Ronnie inform a paranoid Lilly, increasingly attached to the pillar, about Rich's death. Hallorann, sensing Pennywise has entered hibernation, leads the military to a pillar, which they remove and burn, while Shaw tells Leroy he intends to free Pennywise and use its powers to control Americans. Meanwhile, Rose hides Hank, believed dead. Pennywise reawakens, appears at Will's house, and captures him.
8	8	"Winter Fire"	Andy Muschietti	Jason Fuchs	December 14, 2025	N/A
Under a dense fog, Pennywise kills the school principal and hypnotizes the children, leading them away as Ronnie, Lilly, and Marge pursue him. Leroy seeks Hallorann's help, and with Rose's tea they silence the voices and track Lilly's dagger; Pennywise separates Marge to kill her, knowing her son, Richie Tozier, will be involved in his death. (Note: As depicted in It Chapter Two (2019)) Hallorann freezes the entity long enough to free Will and the other children, but Shaw and the military intervene, killing Taniel and detaining the adults. Pennywise kills Shaw and pursues the children as they try to restore the cage, while the adults subdue the soldiers and shoot Pennywise, slowing him until Rich's spirit helps place the dagger. Marge explains to Lilly that the entity experiences time differently and may be acting to avoid its own future death. After Rich's funeral, Ronnie and Will share a kiss before she leaves Derry with Hank, Hallorann leaves to work as a hotel chef, Charlotte and honorably discharged Leroy remain in Derry, and Ingrid is institutionalized. Twenty-six years later, a still institutionalized Ingrid meets Beverly Marsh after the suicide of her mother Elfrida.

=== Special (2026) ===
No. overall	Title	Directed by	Written by	Original release date	U.S. viewers (millions)
9	"A Story of Derry"	Tazbah Chavez	Cherie Dimaline & Jasmyne Flournoy	October 31, 2026 (Note: The special episode "A Story of Derry" was released to HBO Max at midnight as a surprise release and aired on HBO later the same day.)	TBD
In a Native American tribe, Necani goes hunting to the western forest, where Tha Galloo lives and despite Sesqui's concern, with Kino and Maneese. Tha Galloo appears disguised as English settlers, but Mitig, a Native American, drives it away with a dagger and tells them how the cosmic turtle Maturin defeated the entity. When Maneese leaves the camp, he discovers that Mitig killed his tribe and that this is what has been feeding them. He informs Necani and Kino, and the trio overpowers Mitig and escape with the dagger. Mitig reveals them that he also sacrificed them to Tha Galloo, which then kills him. Sesqui leads a search party into the forest but is mortally wounded by the entity. At a subsuquent council, Kino uses Mitig's substance to astrally communicate with Maturin, who reveals the location of the entity's crash site when he banished it to Earth. The tribe gathers thirteen fragments of the stone from its prison, cages Tha Galloo around the western forest and vows to guard the cage forever.

== Production ==
=== Development ===
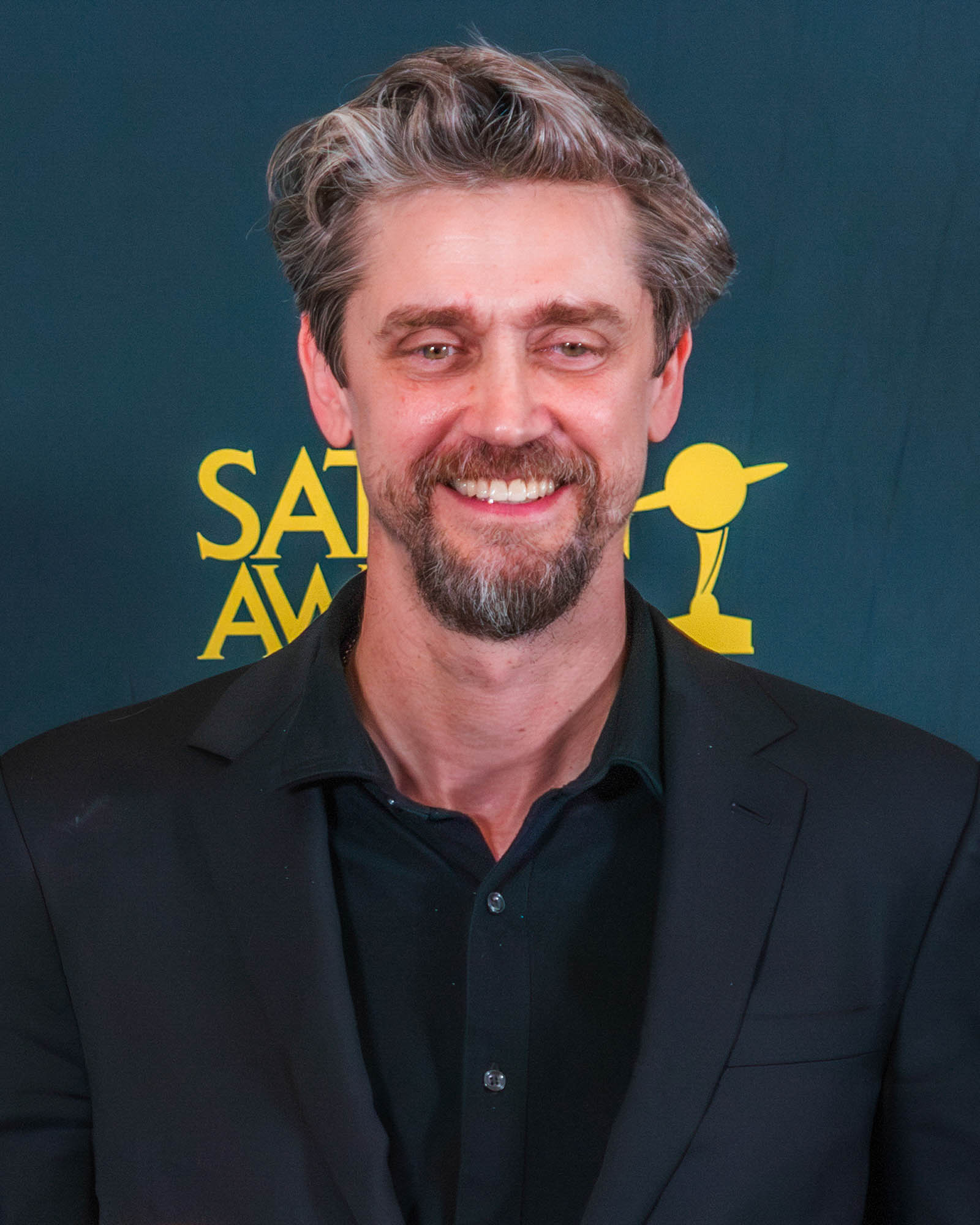
Andy Muschietti, director of the two It films, served as creator and writer of It: Welcome to Derry

The idea of making a prequel series about Bob Gray's origin story and how he became Pennywise came to their mind during the filming of It Chapter Two (2019), which Andy Muschietti called "one of the big enigmas" that serves to generate tension in the book. In March 2022, Variety reported that Andy, Barbara Muschietti and Jason Fuchs were developing and serving as executive producers of a prequel television series of the film It (2017) for HBO Max, titled Welcome to Derry. It was to take place in the 1960s before the events of the film. It received a production commitment in November 2022, and Fuchs and Brad Caleb Kane were hired as co-showrunners. The series was given a greenlight in February 2023, with Andy Muschietti directing multiple episodes, including the pilot written by Fuchs. Bill Skarsgård serves as an executive producer. John Bear Mitchell of the Penobscot Nation served as a consultant during development. This included advising producers on effective depiction of Wabanaki culture and history and actors on appropriate accents as well as other appropriate historic depictions. According to Mitchell, "I wanted the native people in there to be active protectors, for people to know they were managing the evil with ancestral knowledge."

In January 2026, it was announced that a second season is in the works, pending to be greenlit. Following speculation about the delay in the second season renewal, HBO head Casey Bloys mentioned that it was due to the time it takes to find the right story, since there's no "book that you're basing it on", but that it is not in limbo and will be made with the right story. In March 2026, Barbara confirmed that the season would happen and explained that the greenlight would only be given once the right story is ready. She added that it hasn't been officially announced yet because studios usually make advance announcements to "declare their confidence" in a show, which isn't necessary for this series. In August 2026, the series was renewed for a second season, with Kane serving as its sole showrunner.

=== Writing ===
Andy set out a three season plan for Welcome to Derry with each season going back 27 years in time, each one being from chapters at the interlude chapters from the It novel, noting that "there's a reason why the story is told backwards." Muschietti mentioned that with the first season they are only "opening a window" of the story and that it will really "manifest" in the second and third seasons. The series will also focus on why Pennywise stays in Derry when he could go "somewhere else" and how he takes advantage of children because adults do not understand what happens to them. Executive producer Jason Fuchs said that the plan, apart from revealing the origin of Pennywise, is also the origin of the "cursed town". For Fuchs, Derry is also the entity "in many ways" because Pennywise "actually predates Derry". If given the opportunity, the planned seasons would leave a "different understanding of the creature, the town's rules, and what motivates It". With its 1962 setting, the first season explores the history of racism in Derry, through Major Leroy Hanlon's experiences as an African American soldier in a predominantly white military and Charlotte Hanlon's activism. Charlotte realizes that racism also persists in the North when Hank Grogan is made the scapegoat for the town's missing children, reflecting the racial tensions of the civil rights movement. Andy described King as "a writer who is very sensitive to social injustice" and wanted to include social commentary that had previously been subtext in his It films.

Andy stated that the second season will be set in 1935 and will focus on the Bradley Gang massacre and the Great Depression in Derry, introducing new characters and younger versions of characters from the first season. Andy mentioned that there would be a lot of Depression-era themes, with children smoking or missing teeth due to the hardships of the time. In August 2026, writing for the second season was already underway. Andy also described Derry as almost a graveyard, "a carcass of something" with its population depleted, poor, tired, jobless and homeless. The new protagonists are children who lack a suburban, comforting life, instead being runaways or orphans in a bleak environment, while hope keeps them going; a family tree will also connect the timeline to the previous season. In October, it was revealed that King's grandson, Ethan King, joined the writing team for the second season.

=== Casting ===
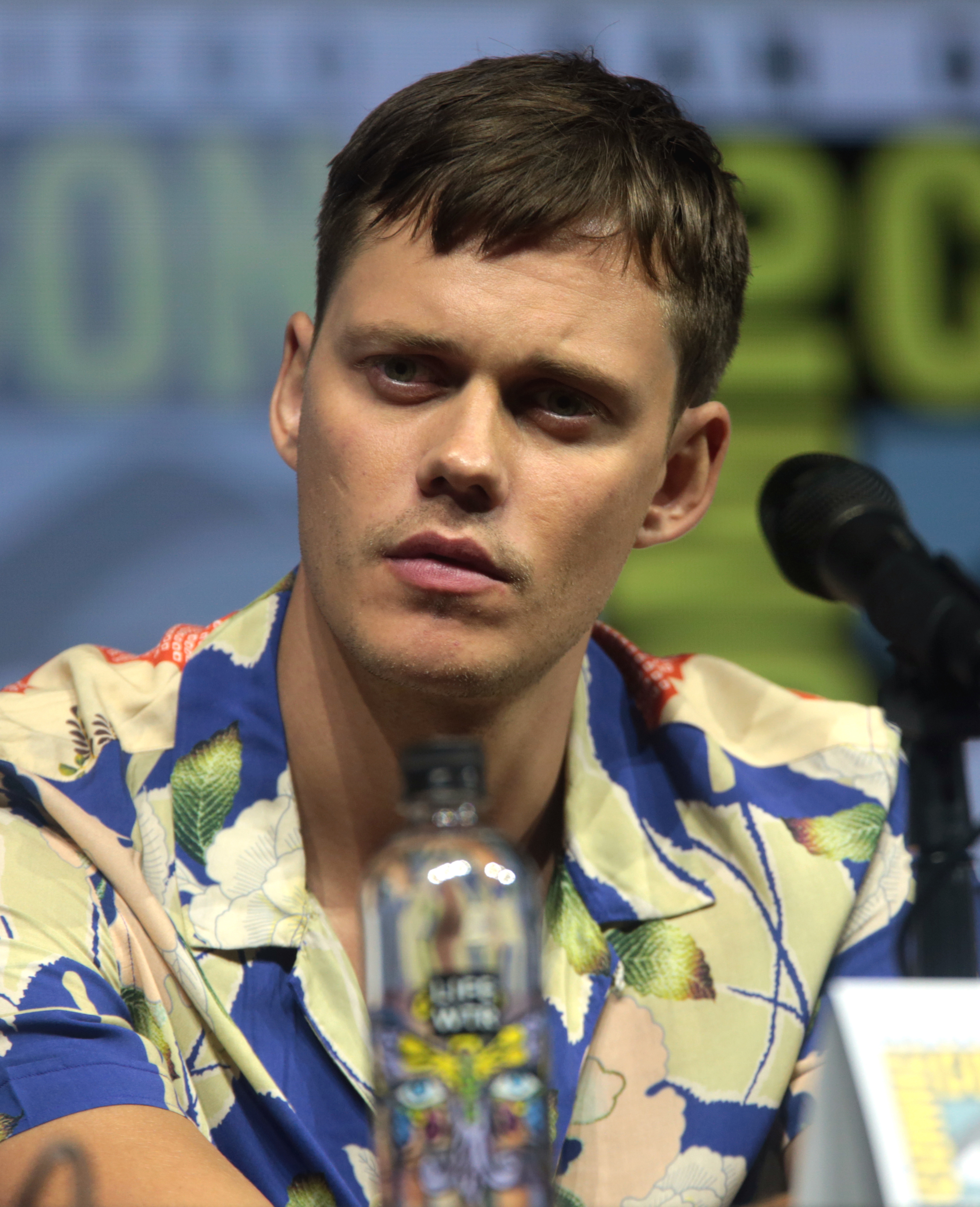
Bill Skarsgård reprises his role as Pennywise from the films.

In April 2023, Jovan Adepo, Chris Chalk, Taylour Paige, and James Remar joined the cast in starring roles. Stephen Rider joined as a series regular and Madeleine Stowe as a recurring guest. In May 2024, Skarsgård was cast to reprise his starring role as Pennywise. The following month, Alixandra Fuchs, Kimberly Norris Guerrero, Dorian Grey, Thomas Mitchell, BJ Harrison, Peter Outerbridge, Shane Marriott, Chad Rook, Joshua Odjick, and Morningstar Angeline were cast in recurring capacities. In July, Rudy Mancuso was cast in a recurring role.

=== Filming ===
Principal photography began in Toronto, Hamilton and Port Hope in May 2023, with the working title Greetings from Fairview, and was expected to continue through December. Scenes were shot at the Delta Secondary School. Scenes set at the Derry Air Forces Base were shot at the Canadian Forces Base Borden in Ontario. In mid-July 2023, production was suspended due to the SAG-AFTRA strike. In August 2024, it was reported that production on the series had concluded, and the series title, It: Welcome to Derry, was announced. Barbara Muschietti revealed the difficulty of returning to film the series with the child cast after the 2023 Hollywood strikes because they were "in a state of spontaneous growth". She estimated that "90% of three episodes" were filmed before production shut down and they had to come back to work in a different season and climate. "This is a summer show", she noted, "but suddenly it wasn't a summer show any more. We had to create a different finale with a different climate". Cinematographers Daniel Vilar and Rasmus Heise shot the season digitally using the Arri Alexa Mini LF camera paired with Panavision Panaspeed lenses. The main visual effects company used was Rodeo FX.

Principal photography for the second season is expected to begin in mid-2027. Location shooting for the season was being considered to take place in Owego, New York, among other potential locations.

=== Music ===
In May 2025, it was reported that Benjamin Wallfisch, the composer of the films, would score the series. Four volumes of the soundtrack were released to streaming platforms from November to December 2025: The first volume, consisting of music from the first two episodes, on November 2; the second volume of music from the third and fourth episodes on November 17; The third volume of music from the fifth and sixth episodes on December 1; and the fourth volume on December 15, containing the music from the final two episodes. The series' intro used the 1956 song "A Smile and a Ribbon" by Patience and Prudence.

== Release ==
=== Broadcast ===
It: Welcome to Derry premiered on HBO on October 26, 2025, with subsequent episodes airing weekly. It was previously slated to stream exclusively on HBO Max in 2024. A special Halloween prequel episode, "A Story of Derry", was released to HBO Max on October 31, 2026 at midnight as a surprise release and aired on HBO later the same day. The second season is expected to premiere in late 2027 or 2028.

=== Podcast ===
During the series release, an 8‑episode podcast IT: Welcome to Derry The Official Podcast was published, discussing the newly released episode weekly. Marc Bernardin and Princess Weekes, as the podcast hosts, discussed the episode and interviewed people from the film crew and the actors.

== Reception ==
=== Critical response ===
On the review aggregator website Rotten Tomatoes, 80% of 166 critics' reviews are positive, with an average rating of 6.9/10. The website's consensus reads: "While scattered plotting occasionally drains the fear from its chilling premise, It: Welcome to Derry compellingly deepens the myth of Pennywise through sharp social commentary, a dreadful atmosphere, and committed performances." Metacritic, which uses a weighted average, assigned the series a score of 61 out of 100, based on 30 critics, indicating "generally favorable" reviews.

Chris Hayner for Polygon called the series an "excellent prequel" and said that he was more interested in the lore of Derry and the influence of Pennywise on it than in the films. He mentioned how the violence was "plenty graphic" and how Pennywise terrorizes and controls the town "through other methods". Chris Evangelista for /Film criticized the show's attempt to answer every mystery that is presented, even those that "no one was asking" and that it is not necessary to reveal Pennywise's origin since "things like that should defy a reasonable explanation", but praised that "it is consistently bloody" and that Bill Skarsgård does not appear in every episode, with Pennywise seen more as a "shape-shifting creature" that "enhances the show" with a higher variety of scares. He stated that the series would "satisfy hungry horror fans".

Jack Hamilton for Slate dubbed the series "a baffling, half-baked mess", complimenting the acting performances of the adult cast and highlighting some standout horror sequences, but criticized the "one-dimensional" writing for the child characters, overly complex plotting, "dated" representation of Native Americans in the United States, weak fanservice and "ham-fisted forays into socio-historical commentary". Lucy Mangan of The Guardian awarded the series three out of five stars, calling the "demonic, liver-eating baby... horrifying", and concluding that "horror fans and fans of King's themes would likely enjoy the series [but] its visceral elements [may] push viewers' tolerance".

=== Audience viewership ===
It: Welcome to Derry garnered 5.7 million viewers in its first 3 days, becoming the third most-watched debut on the platform, behind only House of the Dragon and The Last of Us. The premiere of the penultimate episode was seen by 5.8 million viewers, with the average audience of the episodes was 10.7 million viewers per episode, with a 60% increase in audience with each episode. The season finale was the most-watched episode with 6.5 million viewers, a 12% increase over the previous record holder. It officially remained in the top three series debuts, and the season was considered a success.

=== Accolades ===
Award	Year	Category	Recipient(s)	Result	Ref.
Art Directors Guild Awards	2026	One-Hour Period Single-Camera Series	Paul Austerberry (for "The Black Spot")	Nominated	
Astra Creative Arts Awards	2025	Best Costume Design	It: Welcome to Derry	Nominated	
Astra Creative Arts Awards	2025	Best Main Title Design	It: Welcome to Derry	Won	
Astra Creative Arts Awards	2025	Best Makeup	It: Welcome to Derry	Nominated	
Astra TV Awards	2026	Best Supporting Actor in a Drama Series	Bill Skarsgård	Nominated	
Astra TV Awards	2026	Best Cable Drama Ensemble	It: Welcome to Derry	Won	
Astra TV Awards	2026	Best Directing in a Drama Series	It: Welcome to Derry	Nominated	
Black Reel TV Awards	2026	Outstanding Drama Series	It: Welcome to Derry	Nominated	
Black Reel TV Awards	2026	Outstanding Lead Performance in a Drama Series	Jovan Adepo	Nominated	
Black Reel TV Awards	2026	Outstanding Supporting Performance in a Drama Series	Chris Chalk	Nominated	
Black Reel TV Awards	2026	Outstanding Supporting Performance in a Drama Series	Taylour Paige	Nominated	
Black Reel TV Awards	2026	Outstanding Directing in a Drama Series	Emmanuel Osei-Kuffour Jr. (for "29 Neibolt Street")	Nominated	
Black Reel TV Awards	2026	Outstanding Writing in a Drama Series	Jason Fuchs, Cord Jefferson, and Brad Caleb Kane (for "In the Name of the Father")	Nominated	
Black Reel TV Awards	2026	Outstanding Production Design	It: Welcome to Derry	Nominated	
Critics' Choice Super Awards	2026	Best Horror Series, Limited Series, or Made-for-TV Movie	It: Welcome to Derry	Nominated	
Critics' Choice Super Awards	2026	Best Actress in a Horror Series, Limited Series, or Made-for-TV Movie	Taylour Paige	Nominated	
Dorian TV Awards	2026	Best Genre TV Show	It: Welcome to Derry	Nominated	
Golden Trailer Awards	2026	Best Horror/Thriller (Trailer/Teaser) – TV/Streaming Series	"Clown" (HBO Max / Buddha Jones)	Won	
Golden Trailer Awards	2026	Best Horror/Thriller (Trailer/Teaser) – TV/Streaming Series	"Trouble" (Warner Bros. Discovery / Zealot)	Nominated	
Golden Trailer Awards	2026	Best Horror/Thriller Poster – TV/Streaming Series	Illustrated Teaser: "Capitol Theater" (HBO Max / The Refinery)	Nominated	
Golden Trailer Awards	2026	Best Horror/Thriller TV Spot – TV/Streaming Series	Duck and Cover Spot (HBO Max / Trailer Park Group)	Nominated	
Golden Trailer Awards	2026	Best Horror/Thriller TV Spot – TV/Streaming Series	Microfiche Spot (HBO Max / Trailer Park Group)	Nominated	
Golden Trailer Awards	2026	Best Original Score (Trailer/Teaser) – TV/Streaming Series	"Clown" (HBO Max / Buddha Jones)	Nominated	
Golden Trailer Awards	2026	Best Sound Editing (Trailer/Teaser) – TV/Streaming Series	"Trouble" (Warner Bros. Discovery / Zealot)	Nominated	
Golden Trailer Awards	2026	Best Thriller TrailerByte for a TV/Streaming Series	Social "Stranger Things" (HBO Max / Rebel)	Nominated	
Golden Trailer Awards	2026	Home Ent: Best Digital – Horror/Thriller	DIG30 "BP & F" (HBO / BOND)	Nominated	
Imagen Awards	2026	Best Young Actor	Arian Cartaya	Won	
MacGuffin Awards	2026	One Hour Period Television Series	Jim Murray	Nominated	
NAACP Image Awards	2026	Outstanding Performance by a Youth (Series, Special, Television Movie or Limited-Series)	Amanda Christine	Nominated	
NAACP Image Awards	2026	Outstanding Performance by a Youth (Series, Special, Television Movie or Limited-Series)	Blake Cameron James	Nominated	
Primetime Creative Arts Emmy Awards	2026	Outstanding Special Visual Effects in a Season or Movie	Daryl Sawchuk, Steve Dellerson, Pier Lefebvre, Jordan Schilling, Steven Tether, Darcy Callaghan, Zena Bielewicz, Eric Withee, Maria Sartzetaki, Sebastien Chartier, Ben King, and Lara Ramirez	Nominated	
Primetime Creative Arts Emmy Awards	2026	Outstanding Title Design	Aaron Becker, Seth Kleinberg, Troy Miller, Joseph Ahn, Michael Lo, Hsien Lun Su, Li-Yu Chen, and Lee Nelson	Nominated	
Saturn Awards	2026	Best Horror Television Series	It: Welcome to Derry	Won	
Saturn Awards	2026	Best Young Performer in a Television Series	Arian Cartaya	Nominated	
Saturn Awards	2026	Best Young Performer in a Television Series	Clara Stack	Nominated	
Saturn Awards	2026	Best Guest Starring Role on Television	James Remar	Nominated	
Saturn Awards	2026	Best Guest Starring Role on Television	Bill Skarsgård	Nominated	
Visual Effects Society Awards	2026	Outstanding Visual Effects in a Photoreal Episode	Daryl Sawchuk, Steve Dellerson, Pier Lefebvre, Steven Tether, and Darcy Callaghan (for "Winter Fire")	Nominated	
Visual Effects Society Awards	2026	Outstanding Character in an Episodic, Commercial, Game Cinematic, or Real-Time Project	Philip Harris-Genois, Pierric Danjou, Chloe Ostiguy, and Jonathan Bourdua (for "The Thing in the Dark"; The Pickle Monster)	Won	
Visual Effects Society Awards	2026	Outstanding Character in an Episodic, Commercial, Game Cinematic, or Real-Time Project	Théo Peronnard, Yan Morin-Dubuisson, Yan Detang, and Jonathan Fleming-Bock (for "Winter Fire"; Pennywise)	Nominated	
