= Matilda Lawler =

American actress

- Occupation: Actress
- Years active: 2017–present

Matilda Lawler is an American actress best known for starring roles in the film Flora & Ulysses, as Flora, the HBO Max miniseries Station Eleven, the HBO series It: Welcome to Derry and the Christmas fantasy series The Santa Clauses. She has received nominations for a Gotham Award, Emmy Award, and a Screen Actors Guild Award.

== Early life ==
Lawler's parents, Matthew and Mara Lawler (nee Demey), are actors.

== Career ==
Lawler's first acting role was in a stage production of Jack and Annie at Hoboken Children's Theater when she was in the first grade. She made her Broadway debut in The Ferryman (2018).

In 2017, she starred in the play The Net Will Appear, in which she played a nine-year-old who becomes friends with a 70-year-old. The actor who played the latter character, Richard Masur, became Lawler's mentor and best friend. She tapped into their relationship for the emotions needed to portray her character in Station Eleven.

For her work in Station Eleven, The New Yorker called Lawler "a gifted performer". In 2022, she appeared in the main cast of the Disney+ limited series The Santa Clauses.

== Acting credits ==
=== Film ===
| Year | Title | Role | Notes |
|---|---|---|---|
| 2020 | The Block Island Sound | Emily | |
| 2020 | Good Grief | Young Nora | Short film |
| 2021 | Flora & Ulysses | Flora | |
| 2024 | Ezra | Ruby | |

=== Television ===
| Year | Title | Role | Notes |
|---|---|---|---|
| 2019–2021 | Evil | Mathilda Mowbray / Brenda | Guest role - 2 episodes |
| 2021–2022 | Station Eleven | young Kirsten Raymond | Main role |
| 2022–2023 | The Santa Clauses | Betty, Santa's Chief of Staff | Main role: season 1 Recurring role: season 2 |
| 2023–present | The Gilded Age | Frances Montgomery | Recurring role - 6 episodes |
| 2025 | It: Welcome to Derry | Margaret "Marge" Truman | 8 Episodes |

=== Theatre ===
| Year | Title | Role | Venue |
|---|---|---|---|
| 2017 | The Net Will Appear | Rory | Mile Square Theatre |
| 2018 | The Ferryman | Honor Carney | Bernard B. Jacobs Theatre |
| 2025 | The Thing About Jellyfish | Suzy Swanson | Berkeley Repertory Theatre |

== Awards and nominations ==
| Year | Association | Category | Work | Result | Ref. |
|---|---|---|---|---|---|
| 2022 | Gotham Awards | Outstanding Performance in a New Series | Station Eleven | Nominated | |
| 2023 | Children's and Family Emmy Awards | Outstanding Younger Performer | The Santa Clauses | Nominated | |
| 2023 | Screen Actors Guild Awards | Outstanding Performance by an Ensemble in a Drama Series | The Gilded Age | Nominated | |
