= Chris Chalk =

American actor

- Born: Christopher Eugene Chalk; December 7, 1977 (age 48); Asheville, North Carolina, United States
- Education: University of North Carolina at Greensboro
- Occupation: Actor
- Years active: 2005–present
- Spouse: K.D. Chalk (m. 2017)

Christopher Eugene Chalk (born December 7, 1977) is an American actor. He is best known for his roles as Lucius Fox in the Fox drama series Gotham and Dick Hallorann in the HBO horror series It: Welcome to Derry. He is also known for co-starring in the HBO political drama series The Newsroom and the HBO historical drama series Perry Mason.

== Early life and education ==
Christopher Eugene Chalk was born in Asheville, North Carolina, on December 7, 1977. He studied at Asheville High School, graduating in 1996.

He attended the University of North Carolina at Greensboro.

== Career ==
On stage, Chalk is known for his role in the 2010 Broadway play Fences.

He is known for television roles such as journalist Gary Cooper in The Newsroom, Marine Tom Walker in Homeland, and murderer Jody Adair in Justified.

Chalk has also been in multiple Law & Order episodes and appears in Gotham as a young Lucius Fox and in It: Welcome to Derry as a young Dick Hallorann. He appeared in the films 12 Years a Slave (2013) and The Red Sea Diving Resort (2019).

He made his directorial debut with the film Our Deadly Vows in 2023.

== Personal life ==
Chalk married Kimberley Dalton Mitchell in his hometown of Asheville on April 22, 2017.

== Filmography ==
=== Film ===
Year	Title	Role	Notes
2005	Rent	Street Vendor Who Sells Coats	
2006	The Architect	Drug Dealer	
2007	Before the Devil Knows You're Dead	Officer	
2012	Being Flynn	Ivan	
2013	12 Years A Slave	Clemens	
2013	Burning Blue	Special Agent Jones	
2015	Lila & Eve	Alonzo	
2016	Come and Find Me	Buck Cameron / Kyle	
2017	Detroit	Officer Frank	
2019	The Red Sea Diving Resort	Col. Abdel Ahmed	
2021	Godzilla vs. Kong	Ben	
2023	All Dirt Roads Taste of Salt	Isaiah	
2023	Our Deadly Vows	Chance Charles	Also director, writer, and executive producer

=== Television ===
Year	Title	Role	Notes
2006	Rescue Me	Young Black Male	Episode: "Sparks"; uncredited
2009	The Good Wife	Third Year Associate	Episode: "Crash"
2009	Law & Order: Special Victims Unit	Neal Douglas	Episode: "Turmoil"
2010	Law & Order: Criminal Intent	Austin Arvis	Episode: "Inhumane Society"
2011	Person of Interest	Lawrence Pope	Episode: "Pilot"
2011–2013	Homeland	Tom Walker	7 episodes
2012–2014	The Newsroom	Gary Cooper	24 episodes
2013	Justified	Jody Adair	2 episodes
2014	Sons of Anarchy	Flint	Episode: "Black Widower"
2015	Complications	Darius Bishop	8 episodes
2015–2019	Gotham	Lucius Fox	33 episodes
2016	The Blacklist	John Addison	Episode: "Drexel (No. 113)"
2016–2017	Underground	William Still	5 episodes
2019	When They See Us	Yusuf Salaam	Miniseries; 2 episodes
2020–2023	Perry Mason	Paul Drake	16 episodes
2022	Shining Girls	Marcus	8 episodes
2024	Feud: Capote vs. The Swans	James Baldwin	Episode: "The Secret Inner Lives of Swans"
2025	It: Welcome to Derry	Dick Hallorann	Main role
