= Barbara Muschietti =

Argentine film producer (born 1971)

Bárbara Muschietti
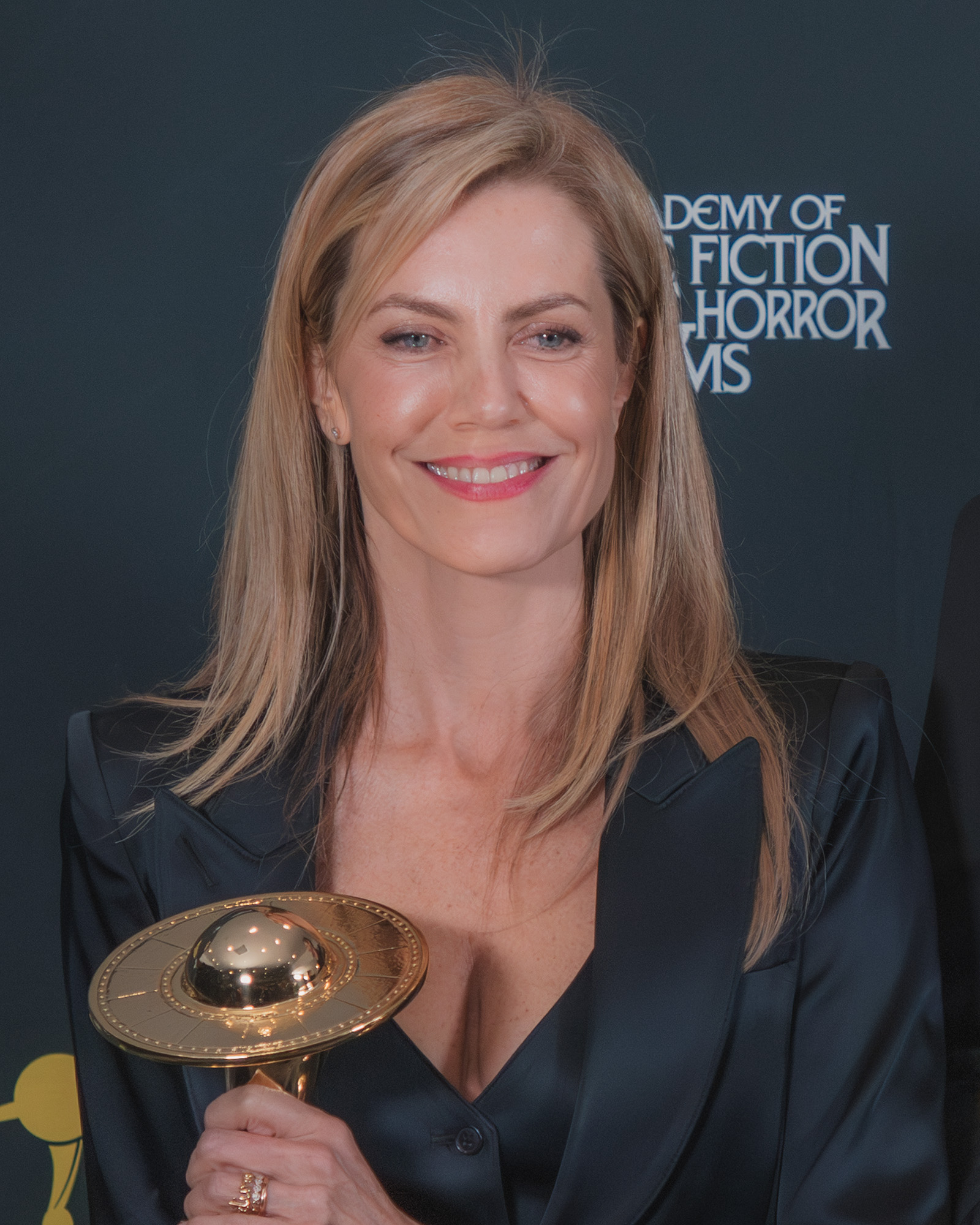
- Muschietti in 2026
- Born: 22 December 1971 (age 54); Vicente López, Buenos Aires, Argentina
- Occupation: Film producer
- Years active: 1996–present
- Known for: Mamá (short film); Mama; It; It Chapter Two
- Relatives: Andy Muschietti (brother)

Bárbara Muschietti (born 22 December 1971) is an Argentine film producer, best known for producing the 2013 horror film Mama, the 2017 and 2019 adaptations of Stephen King's It, and the 2023 superhero film The Flash, all of which were directed by her younger brother, Andy Muschietti.

== Personal life ==
Muschietti is of Italian descent. She is married to writer Arthur Phillips.

== Filmography ==
Producer

| Year | Title | Notes |
|---|---|---|
| 2008 | Mamá | Short film |
| 2011 | Historias de Dhallywood | Documentary |
| 2013 | Cromosoma cinco | Video documentary |
| 2013 | Mama | Also writer |
| 2014 | Antigona despierta | Documentary |
| 2017 | It | |
| 2019 | It Chapter Two | |
| 2023 | The Flash | |
| 2026 | They Will Kill You | |

Executive producer

- Locke & Key (2020–2022)
- The Electric State (2024)
- It: Welcome to Derry (2025–present) (Also developer)
- Ride or Die (2026)
