= Jason Fuchs =

American actor and screenwriter (born 1986)

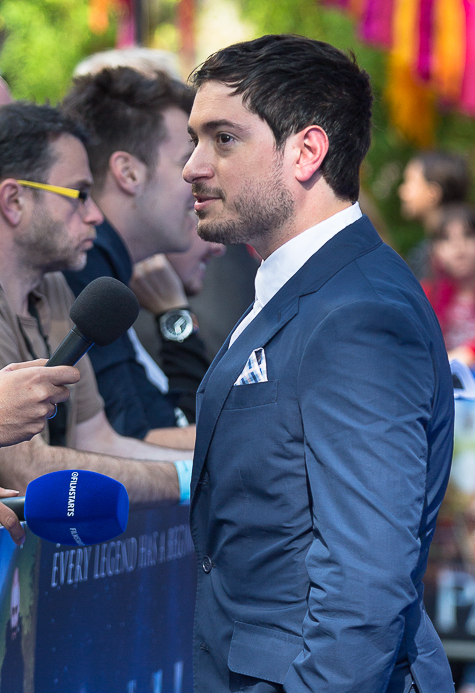
- Fuchs at the Pan premiere in September 2015
- Born: Jason Isaac Fuchs; March 5, 1986 (age 40); New York City, U.S.
- Education: Columbia University
- Occupations: Actor; screenwriter
- Years active: 1996–present

Jason Isaac Fuchs (born March 5, 1986) is an American actor and screenwriter, best known for writing Ice Age: Continental Drift (2012), Pan (2015), and Argylle (2024). He is also known for his role as Lawrence Grey on the Fox dramatic thriller The Passage. In January 2015, Fuchs was included on the Forbes 30 Under 30 list.

As a writer, his films have grossed over $1.9 billion at the global box office, making him one of the 100 highest grossing screenwriters of all time, one of only two writers under age 40 on that list.

== Early life ==
Fuchs was born in New York City, to a Jewish family (of Hasidic background on his father's side). He went on to enroll and graduate from Columbia University in 2009 as a film studies major.

== Career ==
Fuchs has been acting since he was seven years old, making his debut at Lincoln Center in the play Abe Lincoln in Illinois with Sam Waterston. Fuchs has also guest-starred on Cosby, The Sopranos, The Beat, Law & Order: Criminal Intent, Law & Order: Special Victims Unit, Ed, and All My Children. His first feature film role was as Marvin in the 1996 movie Flipper, co-starring Elijah Wood. In 1998 he appeared in two movies, Louis & Frank and Jane Austen's Mafia!. Fuchs also starred in 2003 film The Hebrew Hammer, co-starring Adam Goldberg.

In 2004, Fuchs took the role in Winter Solstice. Fuchs wrote, produced and starred in the 2006 short film Pitch, which made its premiere at the 2006 Cannes Film Festival. He next appeared in Holy Rollers, a movie inspired by actual events in the late nineties when Hasidic Jews were recruited as mules to smuggle ecstasy from Europe into the United States. He played a brother of Justin Bartha's character, alongside Jesse Eisenberg and Ari Graynor.

In 2012, Fuchs' original TV movie musical, Rags, was broadcast on Nickelodeon. The film, which Fuchs co-wrote with Hillary Galanoy & Elizabeth Hackett with Billie Woodruff directing, was a revisionist take on the Cinderella tale, starring Keke Palmer and Max Schneider. The film received 3.5 million live viewers. Later that year, Fuchs made his feature screenwriting debut with the animated sequel Ice Age: Continental Drift. Despite receiving generally mixed reviews from critics, the film grossed $877 million at the box office, making it the fifth highest-grossing film of 2012, and the highest-grossing animated film internationally to that point.

His script Pan was listed on Hollywood's 2013 Black List, and was made into a 2015 film, which was a critical and box office failure. Fuchs co-wrote the 2017 film Wonder Woman with Zack Snyder and Allan Heinberg. In 2016, Warner Bros. hired Fuchs to write the script for a Lobo feature film, and a film adaptation of the video game Minecraft. Fuchs stopped working on the script for the Minecraft film in August 2018.

In 2019, Fuchs was featured in a major recurring role as Lawrence Grey on the Fox series The Passage. In November 2022, it was announced that Fuchs was one of the showrunners of It: Welcome to Derry, a prequel series to the horror films It and It Chapter Two.

In September 2025, it was announced that Fuchs would write the script to a live action adaptation of My Hero Academia for Netflix. In June 2026, TheWrap reported that Fuchs had been hired by Paramount to write the script for an untitled Transformers film. Which then later revealed to be a new film by Michael Bay.

== Filmography ==
=== Film ===
Year	Title	Role	Notes
1996	Flipper	Marvin	
1998	Louis & Frank	Louis Jr.	
1998	Mafia!	Vincenzo	
2000	Spooky House	Yuri	
2003	The Hebrew Hammer	Adolescent Hasidic Boy	
2004	Winter Solstice	Bob	
2006	Pitch	Jason	Short film
2010	Holy Rollers	Leon Zimmerman	
2010	The Firefly and the Bride	Brat	
2016	La La Land	Carlo	
2019	It Chapter Two	Richie's Manager	
2024	Argylle	Moderator	

==== As screenwriter/producer ====
Year	Title	Writer	Producer	Notes
2006	Pitch	Yes	Yes	Short film
2012	Ice Age: Continental Drift	Yes	No	
2012	Rags	Yes	No	Television film
2015	Pan	Yes	No	
2017	Wonder Woman	Story	No	
2018	I Still See You	Yes	Executive	
2019	It Chapter Two	Yes	Co	Additional Literary Material (Uncredited)
2024	Argylle	Yes	Yes	
2025	A Minecraft Movie	Yes	No	Additional Literary Material (Uncredited)
TBA	My Hero Academia	Yes	No	

=== Television ===
Year	Title	Role	Notes
1998	Cosby	David	
2000	The Sopranos	Junior Sontag	Episode: "Commendatori"
2000	The Beat	Joshua Meyerwitz	
2002	Law & Order: Criminal Intent	Ricky Feldman	
2002	Law & Order: Special Victims Unit	Nick Radsen	
2003	Fillmore!	Johnny Nevada (voice)	
2003	Ed	Wesley Stout	
2005	All My Children	Young Ryan	2 episodes
2019	The Passage	Lawrence Grey	6 episodes
2021	Mythic Quest	Strauss	1 episode
2025–present	It: Welcome to Derry	—N/a	Co-Showrunner and co-creator
2026	Crystal Lake	Nate	3 episodes

=== Video games ===
Year	Title	Role
2004	Red Dead Revolver	Billy Cougar / Jody / Young Red Harlow
2006	Bully	Bo
2008	Grand Theft Auto IV	The Crowd of Liberty City

== Awards and nominations ==
- 2018: Satellite Award for Best Adapted Screenplay for Wonder Woman (Nominated)
- 2018: USC Scripter Award for Best Adapted Screenplay for Wonder Woman (Nominated)
- 2018: Saturn Award for Best Film Screenplay for Wonder Woman (Nominated)
- 2018: Hugo Award for Best Dramatic Presentation - Long Form for Wonder Woman (Won)
- 2019/2020: Saturn Award for Best Horror Film for It Chapter Two (Nominated)
- 2025: Saturn Award for Best Action / Adventure Film for Argylle (Nominated)
- 2026: Black Reel TV Awards for Outstanding Writing in a Drama Series for IT: Welcome to Derry (Nominated)
- 2026: Dorian TV Award for Best Genre Show for IT: Welcome to Derry (Nominated)
