= Dick Hallorann =

Fictional character from Stephen King's The Shining

- The Shining character
- Scatman Crothers as Dick Hallorann in The Shining
- First appearance: The Shining (1977 novel)
- Last appearance: It: Welcome to Derry (2025 TV series)
- Created by: Stephen King
- Portrayed by: Scatman Crothers (1980); Melvin Van Peebles (1997); Arthur Woodley (2016); Carl Lumbly (2019); Chris Chalk (2025)

In-universe information
- Full name: Richard Hallorann
- Occupation: Head Chef at The Overlook Hotel, US Airman (formerly)
- Family: Carl Hallorann (brother; deceased); Rose Hallorann (grandmother; deceased); Andy Hallorann (grandfather; deceased)

Richard "Dick" Hallorann is a fictional character created by Stephen King from his 1977 novel The Shining. He has telepathic abilities he called "the shining" and is the head chef at the Overlook Hotel. He meets Danny Torrance, a boy who is also telepathic, and learns that the evil spirits of the hotel have taken control of Danny's father, Jack.

Hallorann is portrayed by Scatman Crothers in Stanley Kubrick's 1980 adaptation of the novel. He was later portrayed by Melvin Van Peebles in the 1997 miniseries adaptation, and Carl Lumbly in the 2019 film Doctor Sleep, an adaptation of the 2013 novel of the same name. Chris Chalk portrayed a younger Hallorann in the It prequel series, It: Welcome to Derry.

== In literature ==
=== The Shining ===
Hallorann first appears in The Shining, where he is the head chef at the Overlook Hotel in Colorado. While packing away for winter one day, Hallorann meets the new caretaker, Jack Torrance, and his family: his wife, Wendy, and son, Danny. Hallorann discovers that Danny carries the same psychic abilities as him. He tells Danny that, when he was a child, he discovered that he and his grandmother could carry conversations with each other without even moving their mouths. She called this telepathy "shining". Hallorann warns Danny that the Overlook can be dangerous, especially to those who "shine". Later, Hallorann is contacted by Danny, who reveals that his father has been influenced by Delbert Grady and the other spirits inhabiting the hotel. Hallorann returns to the hotel in an attempt to rescue Danny and Wendy from Jack. He is successful and the three escape, leaving Jack behind in the hotel while it explodes.

=== It ===
Hallorann is mentioned in Stephen King's 1986 epic supernatural horror novel It as being one of the founders of The Black Spot, a bar in Derry, Maine which catered towards African-American soldiers. The Black Spot was eventually burned down in an act of racial hatred by a group titled "The Maine Legion of White Decency" in 1930. Hallorann uses his Shining ability to find survivors and rescue them, one of them being Will Hanlon, who went on to become the father of Mike Hanlon, a central character in It. It is suggested that the arson of The Black Spot was initiated by Pennywise the Clown, the novel's main antagonist. The Black Spot was also referenced in King's 1994 horror-fantasy novel Insomnia.

=== Doctor Sleep ===
In Stephen King's 2013 sequel, Doctor Sleep, which occurs several years after the events of The Shining, Hallorann remains close with Wendy and Danny, and becomes something of a mentor to the latter. One night, Danny wakes up to use the restroom, only to encounter Lorraine Massey, one of the spirits from The Overlook, prompting Wendy to call Hallorann for help. Hallorann reveals that, as a child, he was emotionally, physically and sexually abused by his grandfather, Andy. After Andy's death, Hallorann was haunted by his ghost, but his grandmother taught him how to lock away such ghosts in an imaginary "lockbox". Hallorann teaches Danny this technique.

Years later, Danny (now going simply by "Dan") attempts to locate Hallorann for help protecting fellow "Shiner" Abra Stone from the True Knot. Dan discovers that Hallorann had died in 1999, but he is still able to communicate with and advise Dan by briefly possessing the body of Eleanor Ouellette, a woman in the hospice where Dan works.

== In film and television ==
=== The Shining film ===
Hallorann was portrayed by musician Scatman Crothers in Stanley Kubrick's 1980 film adaptation. While the film departs from King's novel in many ways (much to King's chagrin), one of the most notable changes is Hallorann's death. In King's novel, Hallorann survives Jack's rampage. However in the film, Hallorann arrives at the Overlook Hotel after sensing that Danny and Wendy are in danger. Jack subsequently strikes Hallorann in the chest with an axe, killing him. His body is then discovered by Wendy when the Overlook attempts to trick her.

Crothers, who stated that he had wanted to play the role of Hallorann before the film had even started production, had a difficult time filming with Kubrick, who had a reputation for repeating takes multiple times in order to get the perfect shot. For example, Kubrick shot 148 takes of the scene in which Hallorann explains The Shining ability to Danny, at the end of which Crothers burst into tears. The shot of Hallorann in a state of shock and horror after being contacted by Danny while staying in Miami also took another 60 takes, which again proved strenuous to Crothers.

=== The Shining miniseries ===
In King's 1997 miniseries adaptation of the novel directed by Mick Garris, Hallorann is portrayed by Melvin Van Peebles. In this interpretation, Jack attacks Hallorann with a croquet mallet once he arrives at the hotel, and Hallorann survives the encounter, as in the novel. While the miniseries itself earned mixed reviews, Van Peebles' performance as Hallorann was critically acclaimed.

=== Doctor Sleep ===
Hallorann was portrayed by Carl Lumbly in the 2019 film adaptation which maintains continuity with Stanley Kubrick's The Shining 1980 film adaptation. Similarly to the novel, Hallorann's ghost instructs Dan to use "lockboxes" to lock away the bad apparitions. Hallorann's spirit later appears again to instruct Dan to protect Abra.

=== It: Welcome to Derry ===
Hallorann was portrayed by Chris Chalk in the prequel series set years before Stanley Kubrick's The Shining 1980 film adaptation. Once Air Force and Korean War veterans Captain Pauly Russo and Major Leroy Hanlon get off a plane at the Derry Air Force Base. Hallorann drives the two and Colonel Fuller to meet with General Shaw, where Leroy is assigned to pilot a B-52, although he experiences racial discrimination from Masters, one of his airmen. After Shaw deescalates the situation, he orders Hallorann to drive him to Q airmen, not without staring down Leroy before he drives off. Hallorann is one of the only enlisted Airmen on the base who is afforded special privileges due to his importance in tracking Pennywise for the military.

After Pennywise is sealed at the end of the season, Hallorann bids goodbye to Leroy and says the voices in his head have gone quiet, before revealing that he is taking an offer to work as a chef in a hotel in London.

=== Cancelled Hallorann film ===
Prior to the release of Doctor Sleep, Warner Bros. had enough confidence in the film that they hired Mike Flanagan to write a prequel focusing on the character, with the working title Hallorann. Following the low box office performance of Doctor Sleep, the project was scrapped. However, with the success of It: Welcome to Derry, a spin-off focusing on Hallorann has been discussed.

== In other media ==
Hallorann appears in the operatic adaptation of King's novel portrayed by Arthur Woodley in a baritone part. In this adaptation, he is again attacked with a mallet by Jack, but is left unconscious and remains in the Overlook Hotel when it explodes. He was able to survive and becomes close with Wendy and Danny.

The character has been parodied in various media. In The Simpsons's Treehouse of Horror parody of The Shining, dubbed "The Shinning", the role of Hallorann is filled by Groundskeeper Willie, who refers to the ability to "Shine" as "The Shinning". Willie is killed by Homer Simpson, who fills in for the role of Jack Torrance. Hallorann is again parodied in the music video for "Spit It Out" by heavy metal band Slipknot. The video parodies the film as a whole, with the band's keyboardist, Craig Jones, filling in for the role of Hallorann in the narrative.

== Reception ==
Hallorann's portrayal in the book, as well as the performance by Scatman Crothers, have been positively received by fans. While not as well acclaimed as Crothers' portrayal, Melvin Van Peebles' portrayal of Hallorann in the 1997 miniseries adaptation was praised.

Hallorann's death in the film adaptation of The Shining is seen as being one of the first movies to start the trope of "The Black Guy Always Dies First In Horror Movies". This is a trope that recognises the fact that African-American or minority characters often do not survive horror movies, and are sometimes the first to be killed off. Hallorann is the first person killed in The Shining, is one of two deaths (along with Jack Torrance) in the film, and is the only on-screen death.

For his performance as Hallorann, Crothers won the Saturn Award for Best Supporting Actor in 1981; Crothers also won Best Supporting Actor from the Academy of Science Fiction, Fantasy or Horror for his portrayal.
