= Joshua Odjick =

Canadian actor

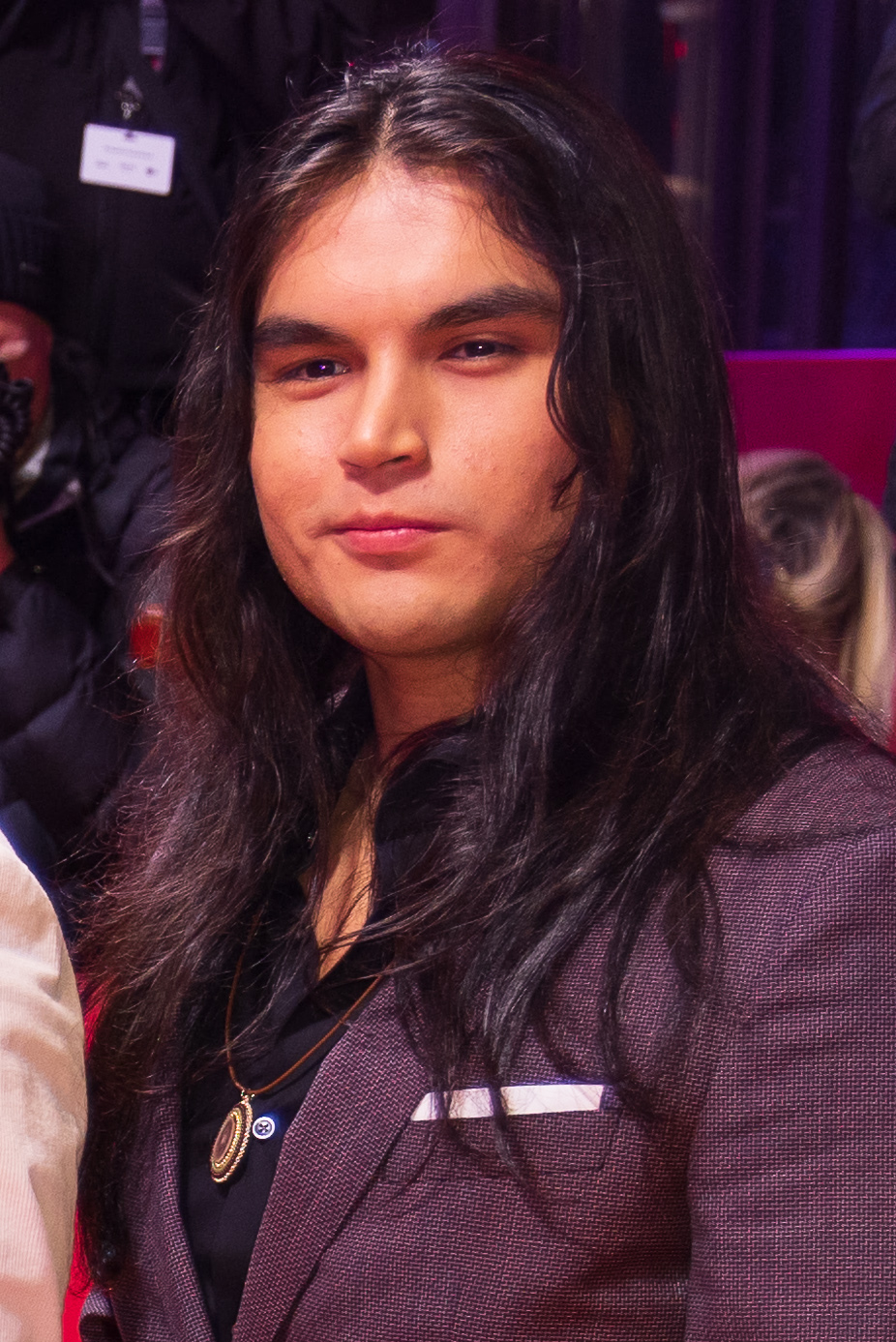
- Odjick in 2023
- Born: October 28, 2001 (age 24); Ottawa, Ontario, Canada
- Occupation: Actor
- Years active: 2020–present

Joshua Odjick (born October 28, 2001) is a Canadian actor of Algonquin-Anishinaabe/Cree heritage and hails from the Kitigan Zibi Anishinabeg First Nations Community. He is most noted for his performance as Pasmay in the 2021 film Wildhood, for which he won the Canadian Screen Award for Best Supporting Actor at the 10th Canadian Screen Awards in 2022, and the Vancouver Film Critics Circle award for Best Supporting Actor in a Canadian Film at the Vancouver Film Critics Circle Awards 2021.

== Early life ==
A member of the Kitigan Zibi Anishinabeg First Nation, he attended Heritage College in Gatineau, Quebec.

== Career ==
In addition to Wildhood, he has appeared in the films Bootlegger, Bones of Crows and Darkest Miriam, as well as the television series Coroner, Unsettled, Little Bird and The Swarm.

In June 2024, it was announced that Odjick had joined the cast of the American supernatural horror television series It: Welcome to Derry. The series was released in 2025 on HBO. In the same year, Odjick, Anna Lambe and Joel Oulette cohosted the documentary series Warrior Up!.

In July 2024, Odjick was cast in a role as Collie Parker on the dystopian horror film The Long Walk, based on the 1979 novel of the same name by Stephen King.

In February 2025, the Governor General's Performing Arts Awards announced Odjick as the recipient of a mentorship, which will see film director Atom Egoyan provide support and guidance to Odjick for a year in the creation and production of Odjick's first short film as a filmmaker.

In July 2025, he was announced as having a supporting role in the upcoming television series adaptation of Bon Cop, Bad Cop.

== Filmography ==
=== Film ===
Year	Title	Role	Notes
2021	Boundless	Journalist (uncredited)	Short film
2021	Wildhood	Pasmay	
2021	Bootlegger	Joseph	
2022	Bones of Crows	Jake Whallach	
2023	Darkest Miriam	Beautiful Young Man	
2025	Sweet Summer Pow Wow	Riley	
2025	The Long Walk	Collie Parker (#48)	
2025	Dusk & Dawn	Dusk	
2025	Frontier Crucible	Apache #2	
2026	Lupe Q and the Galactic Earworms	Toro	Post-production
2026	Down	Art Spirit	Short film; completed
TBA	Wind River: The Next Chapter	Danny Grey	Post-production
TBA	Lumi	Path	Post-production
TBA	Love Is Not the Answer	TBA	Post-production

=== Television ===
Year	Title	Role	Notes
2020	Coroner	Ernest Couchie	Episode: "One Drum"
2020	Unsettled	Myles	10 episodes
2022	Pour toi Flora	Jean	Miniseries; 5 episodes
2022	Heritage Minutes	Tom Longboat	Episode: "Tom Longboat"
2022	Three Pines	Tommy Kis	3 episodes
2023	The Swarm	Leon Anawak	8 episodes
2023	Little Bird	Niizh	2 episodes
2023	Bones of Crows	Jake Whallach	2 episodes
2024	Warrior Up!	Co-host	
2025	NCIS: Origins	Young Témet Téngalkat	Episode: "From the Ashes"
2025	It: Welcome to Derry	Taniel	6 episodes
2026	Law & Order Toronto: Criminal Intent	Mike Brazeau	Episode: "XOXO"
2026	Bon Cop, Bad Cop	Joe Broom	Series regular
2026	North of North	Cheekbones	2 episodes
