= It (miniseries) =

1990 psychological horror drama miniseries

- Promotional poster of It
- Also known as: Stephen King's It
- Genre: Supernatural horror Psychological drama Coming-of-age
- Based on: It by Stephen King
- Teleplay by: Tommy Lee Wallace (episodes 1 and 2); Lawrence D. Cohen (episode 1)
- Directed by: Tommy Lee Wallace
- Starring: Harry Anderson; Dennis Christopher; Richard Masur; Annette O'Toole; Tim Reid; John Ritter; Richard Thomas; Tim Curry; Jonathan Brandis; Emily Perkins; Seth Green
- Narrated by: Tim Reid
- Composer: Richard Bellis
- Countries of origin: United States; Canada
- Original language: English
- No. of episodes: 2

Production
- Producers: Mark Basino; Allen S. Epstein; Jim Green
- Cinematography: Richard Leiterman
- Editors: David Blangsted; Robert F. Shugrue
- Running time: 192 minutes (original/VHS version); 187 minutes (DVD/Blu-ray version)
- Production companies: Lorimar Television; DawnField Entertainment; The Konigsberg & Sanitsky Company; Green/Epstein Productions
- Budget: $12 million

Original release
- Network: ABC
- Release: November 18 – November 20, 1990

It (also known as Stephen King's IT) is a 1990 ABC two-part psychological horror drama miniseries directed by Tommy Lee Wallace and adapted by Lawrence D. Cohen from Stephen King's 1986 novel of the same name. The story revolves around a predatory monster that can transform itself into its prey's worst fears to devour them, allowing it to exploit the phobias of its victims. It mostly takes the humanoid form of Pennywise, an evil clown. The protagonists are The Lucky Seven, or The Losers Club, a group of outcast kids who discover Pennywise and vow to kill him by any means necessary. The series takes place over two different time periods, the first when the Losers first confront Pennywise as children in 1960, and the second when they return as adults in 1990 to defeat him a second time after he resurfaces.

Cast members included Tim Curry (Pennywise), Richard Thomas, Annette O'Toole, John Ritter, Harry Anderson, Jonathan Brandis, Tim Reid, Dennis Christopher, and others. Produced by Green/Epstein Productions, It was filmed over a period of three months in Vancouver, British Columbia, in mid-1990 with a budget of $12 million, double the usual television budget. The miniseries was first broadcast during the November sweeps month. Despite the risk factors, mixed pre-airing critical reviews, and coverage of President George H. W. Bush's foreign trips cutting into the program, It was ABC's biggest success of 1990; the miniseries pulled through with a total of 30 million viewers for its two parts.

It was nominated for two Emmy Awards, one Eddie Award, one Youth in Film award, and a best miniseries recognition from the People's Choice Awards; it won two of the nominations, an Emmy Award for Outstanding Music Composition for Richard Bellis' score and an Eddie Award for the miniseries' editing.

While divided critical perspectives towards It have continued in later years, the miniseries has become most known for Curry's version of Pennywise, considered by several publications to be one of the scariest clown characters in film and television. It has also spawned an Indiegogo-funded documentary film about the miniseries' production, titled Pennywise: The Story of It (2020); and an alternate history sequel short named Georgie, also by the producers of the documentary.

== Plot ==
During a heavy rainstorm in Derry, Maine, in the spring of 1960, George Denbrough plays in the streets with a paper sailboat made by his stuttering older brother, Bill. It falls into a storm drain, where Georgie encounters Pennywise the Dancing Clown. Pennywise entices Georgie to reach in to retrieve his boat, only to tear his arm off and leave him to bleed to death. A few months later, Bill and his asthmatic peer Eddie Kaspbrak befriend the chubby new kid Ben Hanscom. The trio are later joined by Beverly Marsh, who lives with her abusive father, and she and Ben are introduced to Bill and Eddie's other friends: the comical Richie Tozier and skeptical, Jewish Boy Scout Stan Uris.

Ben develops feelings for Beverly, and sends her an anonymous poem, but she assumes the poem is from Bill and develops feelings for him. At school, by the creek, and around town, they are all bullied by Henry Bowers and his greaser gang. The kids all have grotesque, frightening encounters with Pennywise. In July, the group is joined by Mike Hanlon, an African-American boy, as Bowers' gang chases him. The kids, now dubbing themselves the "Losers Club", fend off the Bowers Gang with rocks. While looking through Mike's History of Derry school project scrapbook, the Losers soon realize that Pennywise, whom they refer to as "It", is not a human, but an ancient creature that awakens roughly every thirty years to hunt and feed.

Realizing that It killed Georgie, Bill leads the Losers into Derry's sewers to kill the creature. Stan becomes separated from the group and is attacked by Bowers and Belch Huggins. Belch is killed by It who has also already killed Victor Criss, and Henry is left traumatized, his hair shocked white. Stan regroups with the Losers in a large sewer chamber. The chamber fills with fog as the seven join hands to form a circle, their united strength, but the circle is broken when Stan is grabbed by It. The Losers take advantage of It's ability to access and use their imaginations against It. Eddie imagines his inhaler is full of battery acid, injuring half of the clown's face, then Beverly slingshots silver earrings at It, which 'breaks' Pennywise's head open, his light force seeping out. Wounded, It flees down a drain, where the children hear groaning, and conclude It is dead. The group exits the sewers, but vows to return should It ever return. Bowers, now insane or possessed from It's deadlights, confesses to the child killings and is institutionalized.

Thirty years later, in May 1990, It kills Laurie Ann Winterbarger in her backyard, signaling another awakening and feeding spree. Mike, the only one to stay in Derry, contacts his old friends to fulfill their oath after hearing reports of missing children. All of the Losers, who have gone on to have successful careers, return to Derry, except for Stan; He cannot bear the thought of returning to fight It, and slits his wrists to bleed to death. The other Losers reunite in Derry, later learning of Stan's suicide. Upon returning, they are all taunted and terrorized by Pennywise. Bowers, with Pennywise’ help, escapes from the asylum to murder the Losers. Meanwhile, Bill's wife, Audra, travels to Derry but is later captured by It, hypnotized by the monster's "deadlights". Bowers attacks and stabs Mike, but fatally stabs himself with his knife when Eddie and Ben rush in to save Mike. Mike is hospitalized, and he gives Bill the two silver earrings he retrieved from the sewers ten years ago. The five remaining Losers return to the sewers to confront It, where Bill realizes that It has Audra.

They reach It's inner sanctum, see the catatonic Audra engulfed in spiderwebs, and discover It's true form of an enormous, spider-like monster. Bill, Ben and Richie are entranced by the deadlights emerging from It, as Beverly retrieves the silver earring she overshot. Eddie attempts to repeat the wound he inflicted on It as a kid, but is grabbed and mortally wounded. Beverly frees her friends, but Eddie dies. The others follow the injured demon spider, killing it by ripping out its heart and crushing it. They remove Eddie's body and the catatonic Audra from the sewers. Mike recovers in the hospital, explaining how the Losers go their separate ways once again, their memories of It and each other fading over time, save for his journal; Beverly and Ben get married and are expecting their first child, and Richie is cast in a film. Bill is preparing to leave Derry, but pulls Audra out of her catatonia by riding her down a street on "Silver", his childhood cruiser.

== Cast and characters ==
I was at first a bit intimidated by my all-star cast, but my fears were unfounded – they all turned out to be generous and supportive team players. The child actors were much more of a challenge [...] I'm especially proud of the adult/child pairings, as I think we made really astute choices and got really lucky making it believable that that group of seven kids grew up to be that group of seven adults, which is no easy feat.

— Tommy Lee Wallace, 2015

It's main ensemble features actors were not very well known in horror, such as John Ritter, Tim Reid, Harry Anderson, and Tim Curry. Thomas's only previous horror venture was Tales from the Crypt; and Anderson's experience in the genre included an episode in the series and his magician shows, where he would eat live animals, put a nail up in his nose, and catch a gun bullet with his teeth. This casting was unusual for a horror production at the time, but producer Jim Green reasoned that it was in order to increase eyeballs from more easily frightened casual viewers. The majority of the adult actors in the film, including Ritter, Dennis Christopher, Reid and Anderson, were hand-chosen by Wallace and Cohen for their roles. Emily Perkins and Marlon Taylor, who played the young Beverly Marsh and Mike Hanlon, were cast out of Vancouver, while Seth Green and Jonathan Brandis were cast out of Los Angeles for the parts of young Richie and Bill.

=== It / Pennywise / Robert "Bob" Gray ===
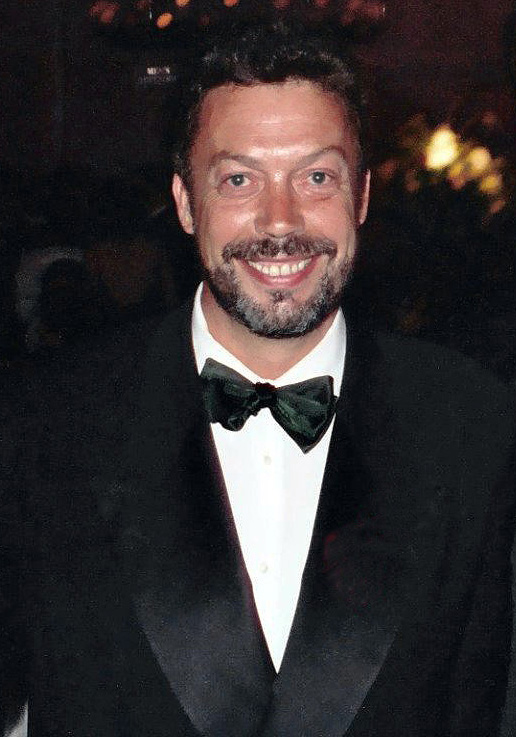
"What's fun about [Pennywise] is that a clown is traditionally a very cozy, comforting image, and Pennywise is none of those things." —Tim Curry in an interview published during It's production

It is the titular shapeshifting antagonist of the miniseries whose primary form is a wisecracking clown named Pennywise, played by Tim Curry. Curry used Robin Williams-esque natural improvisation when playing Pennywise, giving the character a Bronx accent in order to sound like, as Curry put it, "an old-time Catskills comic." While the original novel showcased It taking on many other incarnations, the miniseries only features four of them (not counting the forms of Georgie, Stan, and Al Marsh): an elderly lady Beverly meets named Mrs. Kersh, portrayed by Florence Paterson; Ben's dead father Captain Hanscom, played by Steve Makaj; a werewolf Richie encounters after viewing I Was a Teenage Werewolf (1957) played by an unknown actor (a 1991 Fangoria feature states an actor played the werewolf, but it did not specify who and the actor is not credited in the miniseries); and It's true spiderlike form, portrayed by Brent Baker.

According to writer Lawrence D. Cohen, he had written the script for the series without a specific actor in mind for the role of Pennywise. Malcolm McDowell, Roddy McDowall, and Alice Cooper were in consideration to play Pennywise, but director Tommy Lee Wallace wanted Curry for the role. King recalled that there was doubt from the crew about Curry playing Pennywise, perhaps due to the actor previously being known for comic roles in films like The Rocky Horror Picture Show (1975) and Clue (1985).

Wallace was not a fan of the other choices, particularly McDowall, as Wallace found him to have too much "sweetness" to play a part like Pennywise. Curry took the role for the clown's "subversive nature," being "both beguiling and murderous" and "a smile gone bad." He was originally planned to play all of It's forms, not just the clown; however, the crew thought it was more efficient to have different actors play the other forms so they did not have to take up so much time dealing with makeup changes.

Because of the amount of makeup Curry's character required, he had the earliest call time of all the actors. On each shooting day, it took at least three hours for him to take off his make-up and get out of his costume. Curry's performance unnerved the cast and crew so much they avoided him as much as possible while on set. While waiting between shots, Curry would be chain-smoking and showing his sharp teeth if one of the child actors got too close to him. As Perkins recalled, "He really tried to intimidate us, because he wanted the fear to be real in our performances." However, Wallace recalled having a pleasant time working with Curry: "Tim was always well-prepared, easy on set, patient and low-key."

In a 2015 interview with Moviefone, Curry called the role of Pennywise "a wonderful part", giving his blessing to would-be successor Will Poulter, who ultimately dropped out. Bill Skarsgård replaced him, and while being interviewed at Fan Expo Canada, Curry gave his approval, saying that "I like [Bill] Skarsgård. I think he's very clever. It'll be interesting to see what sort of clown face he puts on. because it's not an obvious clown face at all.[..] So I'm fascinated to see it."

=== The Losers ===
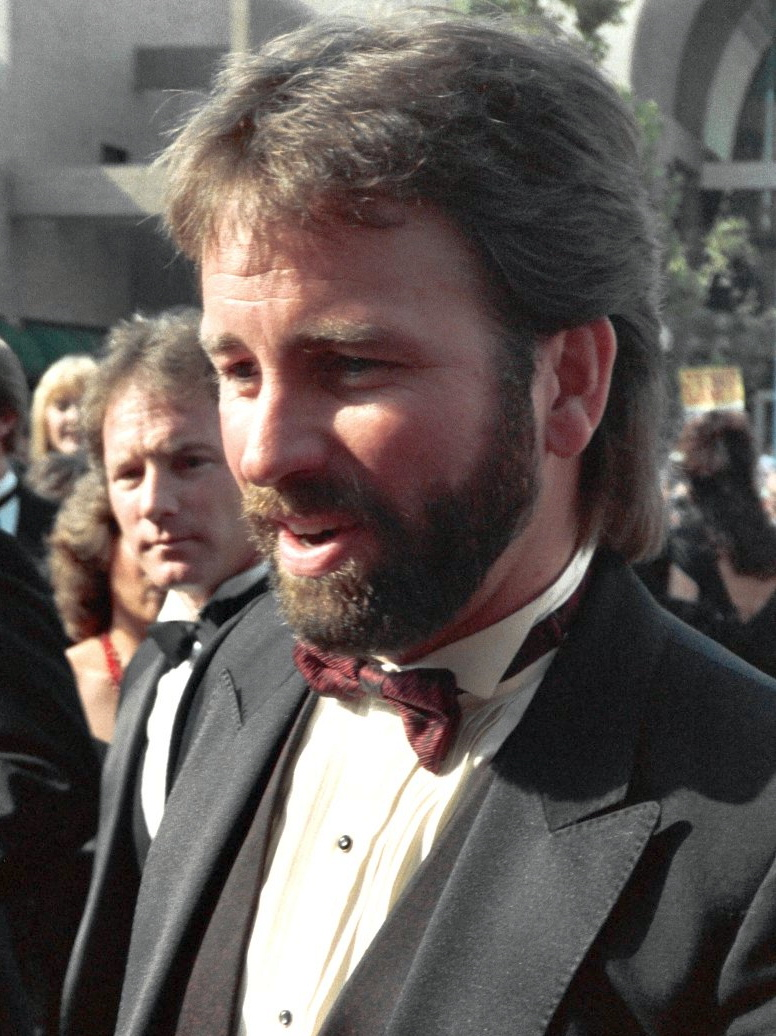
John Ritter had made several attempts to appear in a King adaptation before he worked on It.

- Richard Thomas portrays Bill Denbrough, the stuttering founder of the Losers Club whose desire to kill Pennywise is heavily influenced by the death of his younger brother Georgie. As an adult, he is a bestselling horror writer who lives in the United Kingdom before returning to Derry to face It in the present time. A Stephen King fan himself, Thomas easily related with the character he portrayed, as he was an easily frightened kid and had an imagination "so vivid that I could scare myself about just about anything. And I've never been particularly fond of snakes." Jonathan Brandis, who played young Bill, described his role the hardest he had ever done, especially when it came to performing the stuttering.
- Annette O'Toole portrays Beverly Marsh, the only female member of the Losers Club, and a fashion designer who has lived both in an abusive family and an abusive relationship. O'Toole was cast in the film at the suggestion of Ritter, with whom she had recently shot The Dreamer of Oz, and she recalled the process happening very quickly. "What I loved about the character was the way she dealt with this terrible, lonely and abusive childhood she had and the way she found a family with these other kids," O'Toole commented. "She kind of gets into this club, and it doesn't really matter that she's a girl. They accept her, and she finds a group of really kindred souls." Describing the actors' interaction off the set, Ritter commented: "It was fun to refer to Annette as the 'it' girl when we went to restaurants together. She was the only woman with us and people thought it was kind of strange for six men to be out with one woman." Emily Perkins portrays young Beverly Marsh.
- John Ritter portrays Ben Hanscom, who has become a successful architect and has undergone a major physical transformation, losing his childhood weight and becoming fit and self-assured. Ritter had previously worked with Thomas on The Waltons. Ritter related to the role of Ben; as a child, he also called his friends "losers" during his most depressed moments. This was Ritter's first horror production, which excited him: "The thing I like about horror is you have to ask: Can I take it? It's like going on a roller-coaster ride. How far can you hang over the edge before you have to pull back? It's the idea that there is this dark side." A huge King fan after the novel Carrie was released, Ritter made multiple attempts to appear in a King screen adaptation before It, all of which failed; his most recent of these was trying to get in touch with George A. Romero to star in a later-rejected theatrical version of The Stand Romero was planned to direct. Ritter then heard about a feature-length version of It in development and asked his manager, "Tell them [ABC] I'll play any part they want me to. I'll play the girl." Initially, Ritter was unable to appear in the miniseries as casting began just as he started filming The Dreamer of Oz: The L. Frank Baum Story (1990). However, the casting was postponed following Romero's leave of the It project (see Development), which opened space for him to get the part of Ben. The young version of Ben is played by Brandon Crane, who, like Ritter, also connected with the character he played; he was raised without a dad and bullied for being fat at school in real life. Crane would later cameo in It Chapter Two (2019) as a working assistant for the adult Ben Hanscom, who was played by Jay Ryan in the film.
- Harry Anderson portrays Richie Tozier, the comedic relief of the group who works as a late-night talk show host and did funny impressions of real-life figures as a child. Anderson used improvisation with delivering one-liners for his character, and even made a directing suggestion to Wallace for a moment where all the Losers Club members hug Bill except for Richie; Wallace was not sure about the decision at first, but Anderson's idea was executed in the final cut as Richie was the only cynical member of the group after Stan's death. Seth Green plays young Richie.
- Dennis Christopher portrays Eddie Kaspbrak, an asthmatic limousine service runner who has lived with his overbearing mother into his adult life. Jim Carrey was originally considered for the character before Christopher was chosen. Adam Faraizl plays young Eddie.
- Tim Reid portrays Mike Hanlon, the only one to remain in Derry following the Losers Club's first defeat of It in 1960. Working as a librarian in the town, he calls all of the Losers to return to Derry 30 years later. David Alan Grier was initially considered for the role of Mike before Reid was cast. The young version of Mike is portrayed by Marlon Taylor, who recalled going through "two auditions and three or four callbacks before I was told that I had the part of young Mike."
- Richard Masur portrays Stanley Uris, a real estate broker who was a Jewish Boy Scout as a kid. Due to the character's early death, Masur has far less screen time than the other Loser actors. Ben Heller, who played young Stan, only had local theatre experience, small parts in 21 Jump Street and Wiseguy, and no commercial or modeling experience before auditioning for It. He got the role after his third read to the casting director, receiving the call claiming he got the part just after his seventeenth birthday. Masur and Thomas previously appeared together in The Waltons episode "The System" in 1974.

Given that the shooting entailed an adult cast with child counterparts, Wallace sought to have the adult actors meet with the children playing the younger versions of their characters: "We made a point of bringing the adult and children actors together for a couple of days, even though it was costly, since the adults and the kids have no scenes together." For Ritter and Crane, the two looked very different, which meant they had to make similar the young and adult versions of Ben through actions and facial expressions.

=== Supporting cast ===
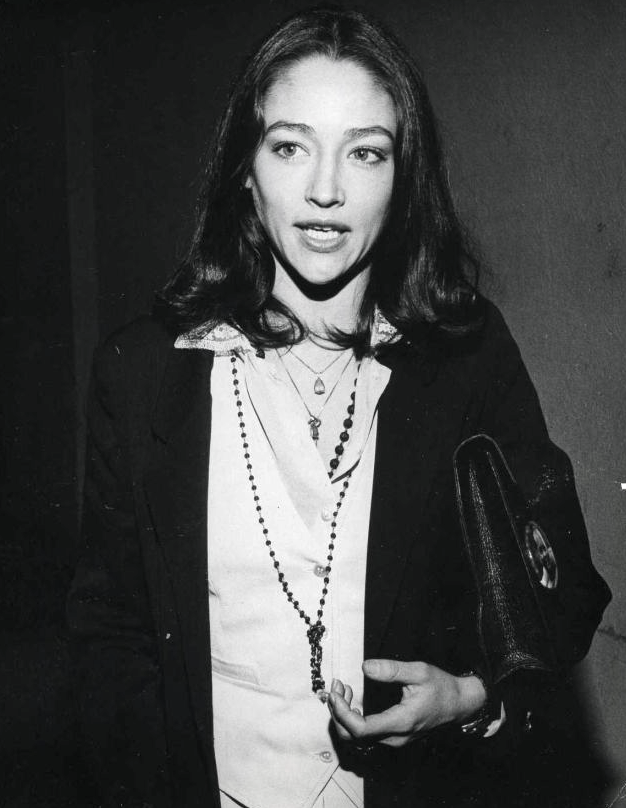
Olivia Hussey portrays Bill Denbrough's wife Audra.

Because It was filmed in Vancouver, most of the supporting cast consists of actors well known in Canadian media and theater; exceptions include British-Argentine actress Olivia Hussey as Bill's wife Audra, Tony Dakota as his brother Georgie Denbrough, and Michael Cole as Henry Bowers. Jarred Blancard played the young version of Henry; he hated having to call the character Mike Hanlon the "Nigger", often apologizing to the actor playing young Mike, Marlon Taylor, for repeatedly using the word during practice. The two actors remained friends after filming had wrapped. The number of the Bowers Gang are reduced from seven in the novel to five for the miniseries: Gabe Khouth as Victor Criss and Chris Eastman as Belch Huggins, while the actors of Peter Gordon and Moose Sadler go uncredited.

Other relatives of members of the Losers Club include Sheila Moore as Eddie's mother Ms. Kaspbrak; Michael Ryan as Beverly's abusive boyfriend Tom Rogan; Frank C. Turner as her just-as-abusive father Alvin Marsh; Caitlin Hicks as Stanley's wife Patti; Steven Hilton and Sheelah Megill as Bill's parents Zack and Sharon respectively; Noel Geer as Cousin Bradley; Susan Astley as Aunt Jean; and Claire Vardiel as Ben's mother Arlene Hanscom.

Chelan Simmons, who played Pennywise's first victim Laurie Ann Winterbarger, had her first non-commercial experience with It; she would later be known for appearing in several 21st-century budget horror films and a 2002 telefilm version of Carrie. Due to her fear of clowns, she has admitted to never seeing the miniseries or reading the original novel. The girl's mother is portrayed by Merrilyn Gann. Two Gemini Award winners, Nicola Cavendish and Venus Terzo, appear as a desk clerk and Ben's woman, Lyndi, respectively. Terence Kelly, who portrays officer Nell, was nominated for a Gemini for another role as an officer in Reg Serge.

Two actors later known from The X-Files appear in It: William B. Davis as Mr. Gedreau, and Megan Leitch as a library aide Richie talks to while being taunted by Pennywise. Other well-known Canadian actors in the miniseries include Laura Harris as Loni; Garry Chalk, most known for voice acting, as Eddie's gym class coach; Jay Brazeau as a taxi driver; Tom Heaton as Mr. Keene; Paul Batten as his grandson; Donna Peerless as teacher Miss Douglas; and Kim Kondrashoff, Helena Yea, and Charles Siegel as Joey, Eddie's chauffeur, Rose, the waitress at the Chinese restaurant, and Nat, Richie's agent, respectively.

== Context ==
A horror sci-fi miniseries these days is as rare as moon rocks, as few and far between as known inhabited planets.

— A 1990 review of It from The Hollywood Reporter.

TV's inherent timidity, its fear of going too far and driving away viewers, is in direct contrast to the purpose of horror, which is to go so far that it scares the people who watch it.

— A contemporaneous It review explaining horror's difficulty in television.

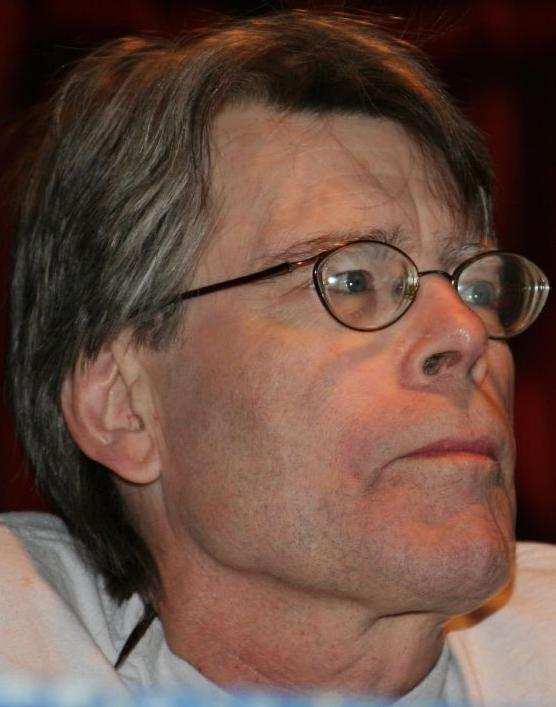
King was strongly dismayed at the limited market for horror on television, and had low expectations once the miniseries was greenlit.

There was only one television version of a Stephen King story before It, that being the 1979 adaptation of 'Salem's Lot (1975), directed by Tobe Hooper. Although critically acclaimed, it did not change King's negative view of horror television, as he still believed that the format was "too institutionally fainthearted and unimaginative to handle real horror" in 1983. This skepticism continued into the mid-1980s when he wrote and published It (1986), and despite its success, he never thought a television version of the book would happen, as TV had a censorship rule not to show children in jeopardy, a major theme in It.

It was written over four years by King with inspirations from the story "Three Billy Goats Gruff" and legends about Bangor, Maine's sewer system. Despite garnering a polarized critical response for its huge number of pages and bizarre sexual sequences, It was the best-selling hardcover fiction book in the United States in 1986, according to Publishers Weekly; and a British Fantasy Award winner.

King's predictions that a TV version of the book would not happen turned out to be false, though justified according to newspaper critic Matt Roush. At the end of the 1980s, a horror product of any kind was an unlikely gamble for a network. The television market was dominated by sitcoms, soap operas, and fictional presentations of real life events; there were series like Freddy's Nightmares (1988–90) and Friday the 13th: The Series (1987–90), but they were often hampered by network censorship, commercial breaks, low budgets, and "cheesy execution."

Other factors increased the risk of a network doing a film or miniseries version of a King story in the late 1980s to 1990; theatrical King screen transfers were performing poorly at the box office, and big TV events like miniseries or films were becoming far less important to viewers due to a rise in VCR ownership by 20 percent from 1985 to 1990. This resulted in channels like ABC taking several cost-cutting measures, such as adding more regular series to its lineup.

Some critics also questioned the airing of a horror film like It on television, a format much easier for children to access than theaters due to less parental and government restrictions.

King described his expectations of the miniseries being "in the basement. Here was a book that sprawled over 1,000 pages, and they were going to cram it into four hours, with commercials."

== Pre-production ==
"We're taking some chances with It, but the networks may be learning there's an audience for heightened evenings. People are hip and savvy, they've seen it all. What David Letterman did with the talk show, Twin Peaks did with the drama. It's a different arena now, with cable and all, and they've got to compete."

— Ritter in a July 1990 interview predicting It's purpose in the television market

Hollywood significantly increased their interest in screen adaptations of King's work after the box office success of Pet Sematary (1989), and several of them went into development; around this time, ABC had acquired the rights to a television miniseries of It and green-lit it to be an eight-to-ten-hour miniseries. One reason, according to Lawrence D. Cohen, was that it was "the heyday of networks adapting lengthy novels for TV." ABC film chief Allen Sabinson explained that they chose to produce It as a previous film based on a King story about children, Stand by Me (1986), was a success. The producers were also focused on the story's drama aspects, likely due to most viewers leaning towards drama productions in 1990.

It was made at a time when the television landscape was making a slight change into unusual styles, as indicated by the popularity of shows like David Lynch's Twin Peaks (1990–91) and Tales from the Crypt (1989–96). Twin Peaks was constantly referenced in discussions between the cast and crew of It during shooting. As Tommy Lee Wallace recalled, "It brought everyone's attention to the fact that it doesn't have to be like and look like and act like everything else to succeed. You can break new ground – not with hard-core violence or nudity, necessarily – but just by being different and strange, which I certainly am trying to bring to It." At the same time, CBS was taking similar chances with the horror film Psycho IV: The Beginning (1990), which aired in the same month as It and also featured Olivia Hussey, who played Audra in It.

=== Development ===
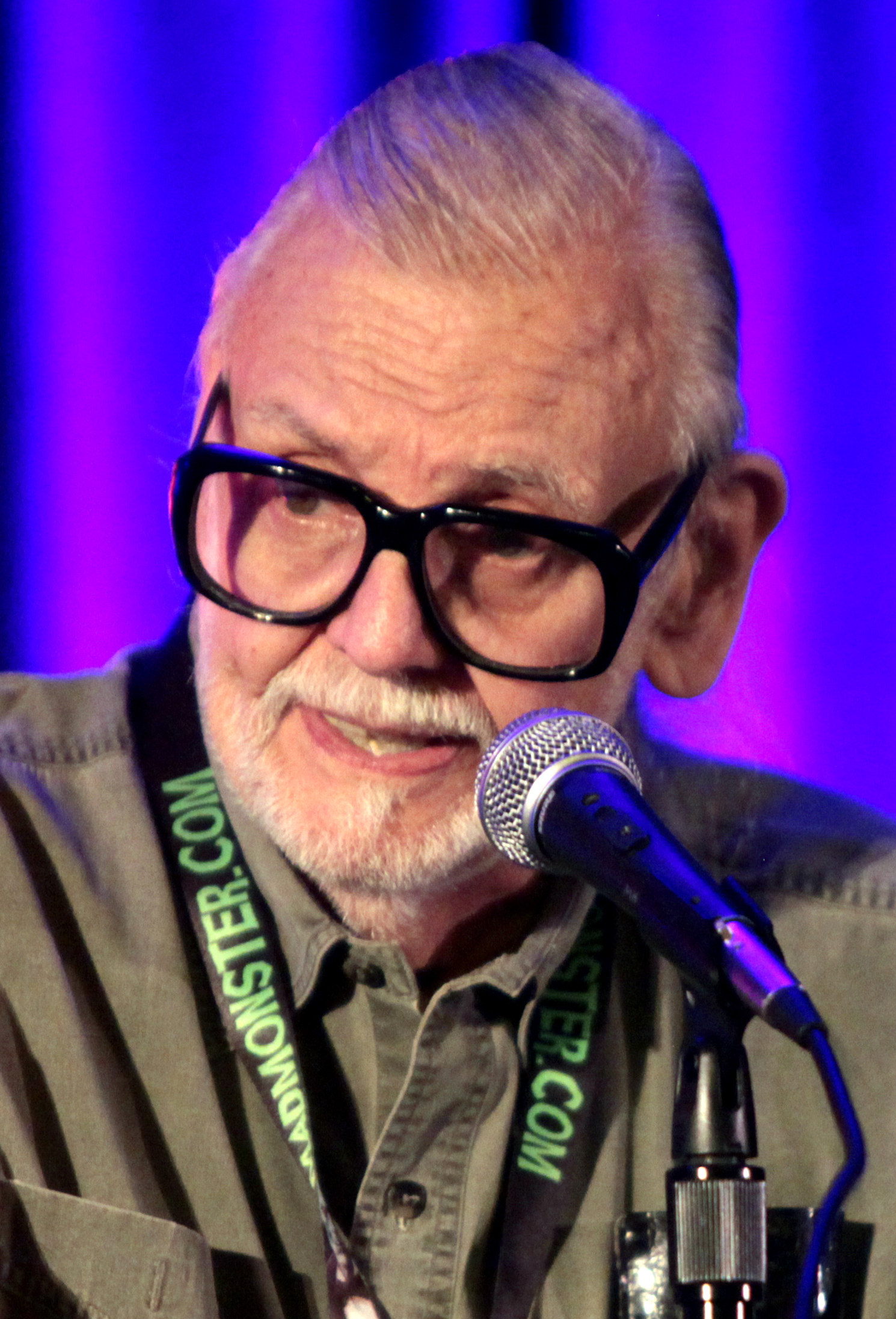
George A. Romero was originally planned to be It's director, but his scheduling conflicts and the miniseries' length decrease influenced him to drop out of the project.

George A. Romero had originally been signed on to direct the project, which at the time ABC had planned for an eight-to-ten-hour series that would run over four two-hour blocks. On June 1, 1989, ABC announced that the miniseries would be six hours and directed by Romero, with no cast planned. A July 1989 announcement published in the Houston Chronicle indicates that the miniseries was originally planned to be set in "small-town Massachusetts" instead of Derry.

In an interview published in January 1990, ABC's Dan Doran described It as a "long-range development project, and it's not even a firm, 100% commitment yet." He also revealed Romero's involvement to be "tentative." However, Romero described himself as being incredibly involved in the project: "I worked with the effects guys. I did [story] boards. I must have thousands of pages of scripts and notes." However, a scheduling conflict with his 1990 remake of Night of the Living Dead (1968) resulted in him having to leave the project just after ABC decreased the length of the miniseries to four hours. His exit initially upset him because it reminded him of his time being dropped from Pet Sematary. However, he stated in 1993 that he appreciated his leave, feeling that the length decrease lessened the likely "impact" of the miniseries' final product. The producers were also worried about Romero making the miniseries too graphic for television.

The producers "lost their nerve" from how much work they could be faced doing an eight-to-ten hour miniseries. Thus, ABC condensed it to a three-part series, before shortly after making it a two-part miniseries once Tommy Lee Wallace was signed on to direct after reading a draft of the first part of Cohen's script.

=== Writing ===
Cohen, who had previously written the film adaptation of Carrie in 1976, was hired to write It, receiving a manuscript of the novel that was sent to his New York apartment in 1986 before the book was published. Although King had multiple drafts of the script sent to him by Cohen, he had little to no involvement in the writing of the miniseries. Cohen's early drafts rejected the flashback format of the book, where the first night would show the Losers as kids and the second part as adults. He originally planned for the spider form to be hinted at in part one when Pennywise was hit by the rock, but the idea was scrapped. Cohen also initially wrote the second episode as, according to Wallace, "a very interior melodrama" that differed heavily from the novel and where Tom Rogan played a much bigger role in the plot.

In reading Cohen's draft, Wallace initially avoided reading the book to get an objective view of it: "I knew I was dealing with people who had been intimately involved with the book for years." After noticing many issues in the script, especially in the second part, Wallace gave Cohen an offer to rewrite his drafts; however, that would have required Cohen to take a three-week trip to the miniseries' Vancouver production location, which his schedule would not permit as he was involved in other projects. This led Wallace to have to re-write the script himself and use the book as reference, which turned out to fix all of the original drafts' issues. As Wallace explained, "One of the things I believe I contributed in my rewrite was just packing in as much of what was memorable about the book." He added the flashback structuring from the book into the script and made sure the screenplay for the second part "maintain[ed] some of the rhythm" of the first.

=== Changes from the novel ===
Given the length of the King novel, which runs 1,138 pages, a great deal of material was left out of Cohen's 215-page screenplay, including subplots concerning the personal lives of the adult characters and a scene in which the young male members of the Loser's Club each lose their virginity to Beverly. Cohen, while upset about the material that did not make it in the final cut, also opined, "the best moments from the book made the cut and the rest are casualties of war." Themes of friendship and loyalty were distorted in the miniseries in order to appeal to non-horror TV viewers.

O'Toole has admitted to disliking the removal of the Losers' orgy scene: "This was their greatest attachment to one another – she thought they were all going to die, and this was a gift she was giving to each one of them, and I thought it was the most beautiful, generous love-filled gift, and it tied them all together in such an amazing way." Cohen retrospectively admitted that he wished he was permitted to write an ending different from the novel's: "If I had to do it over again, my instinct would be to find a way to have the adults confront Pennywise in another way, in all his shapeshifting glory."

One major change King disliked but had to deal with was the decreased amount of depth of the main characters, particularly Richie Tozier, who was altered from a Los Angeles DJ into a television show comedian. He found the miniseries' version of Richie to have only two dimensions: "scumbag" and "sort of a kindhearted Buddy Hackett." However, Wallace and Cohen retained the centrality of Pennywise in the source novel; as noted by film scholar Tony Magistrale in Hollywood's Stephen King, the made-for-television movie retains the "association between the adult world of Derry and It [which] is further established in the masterful choice of a carnival clown as a unifying symbol for the various creatures representing the monster."

== Production ==
=== Filming ===
We really felt like we were in Derry. All the exterior stuff was done in Stanley Park and I remember being amazed it was so woodsy and so far removed.

— Crane, 2015

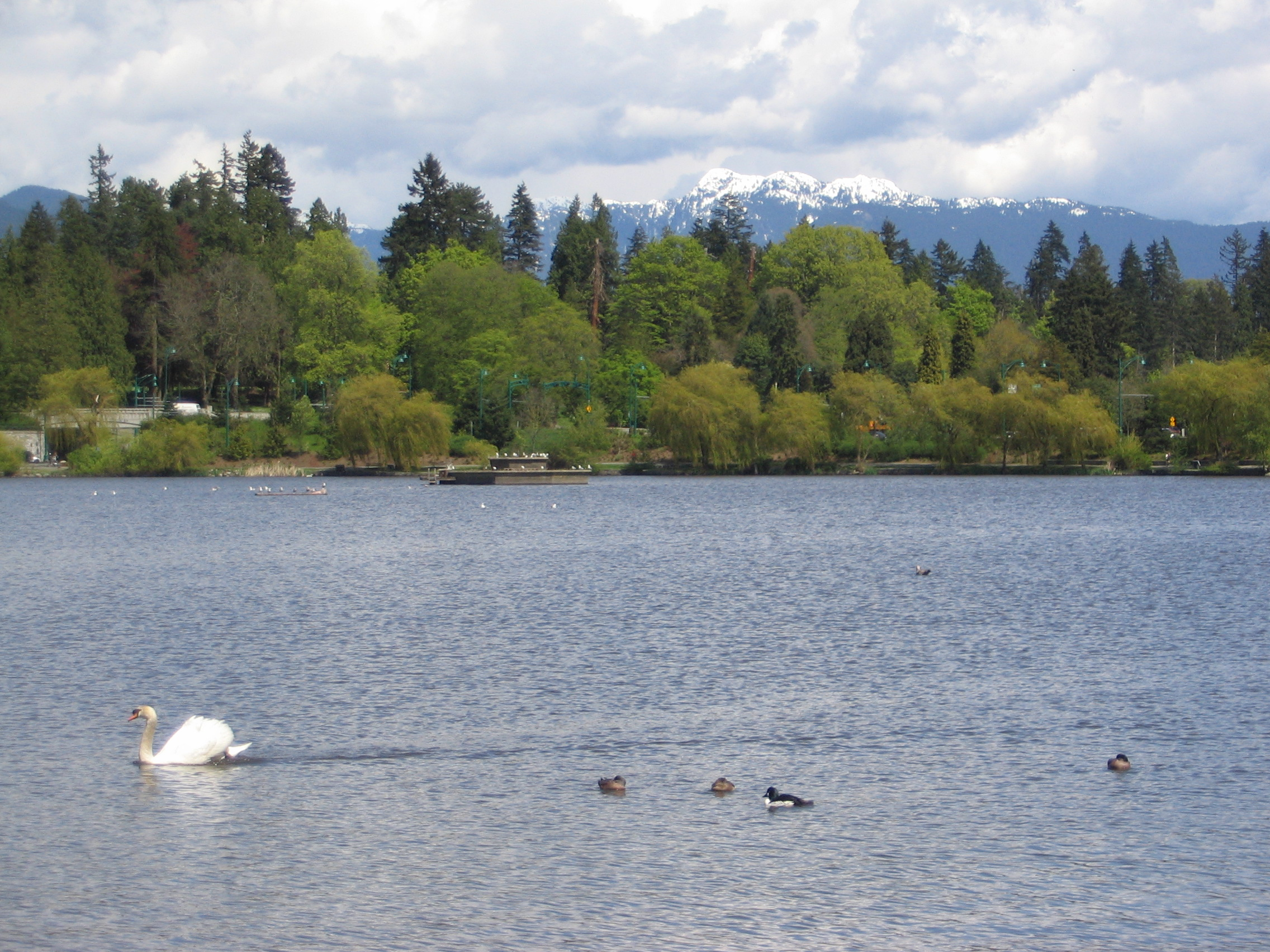
The Lost Lagoon served as It's filming location for the Captain Hanscom scene.

It was shot over a three-month summer period in Vancouver, British Columbia, Canada. Green set the budget at $12 million, double the usual television film, to give It a major motion picture feel. Filming locations in Vancouver included Stanley Park, Beaver Lake and Saint Thomas Aquinas High School Convent in North Vancouver. The Buntzen Lake Hydro Plant, in particular, was used as the miniseries' sewer plant.

For the opening scene where Laurie Winterbarger is eaten by Pennywise, Simmons' shots were done while Curry was not on set; Wallace stood at the laundry area of the backyard giving her simple directions for emotions. However, she still met Curry via read-throughs and while in her trailer after the shot: "while walking down the sidewalk Tim walked by in the full clown costume—make up and all. He turned to me and said 'Hi!' in a very friendly voice, but it still scared me half to death!" Similarly, the scene where Patti Uris finds her husband dead in the tub (done on the first shooting day) involved Uris not being on set for shots of Caitlin Hicks' reaction. The Captain Hanscom sequence in the first part was shot at the Lost Lagoon, which involved Makaj on a platform just below the water surface to give the illusion of the character standing on water. The shots of the captain's corpse were done when Crane was not on set.

Filming It was not without difficult sequences. The scene where the blood-filled balloon explodes in Beverly's bathroom required multiple takes due to how difficult it was to get the timing of the explosion right. The theater scene took many retakes and much waiting, so Curry went on the stage and entertained the child extras with singalongs, all unaware he was playing a monster character in the miniseries. Shooting the last sewer scene was tough for the adult actors, as they had to deal with walking in an area filled with rust likely infected with tetanus. The final scene with Bill and Audra Denbrough took days to rehearse, a library scene with all the adult actors involved some slight injuries due to the number of objects randomly flying around the place, while the photo album scene where Pennywise comes to life was the hardest scene to shoot for Wallace.

=== Directing ===
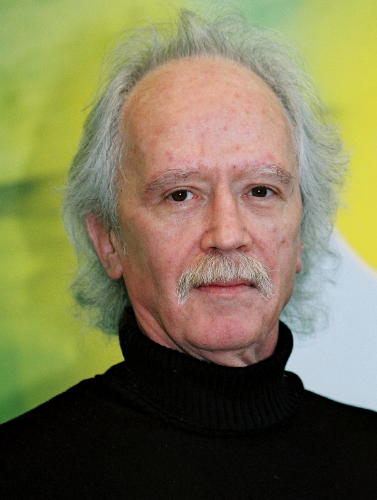
Tommy Lee Wallace had previously worked with John Carpenter (pictured), and much of Wallace's directing for It was inspired by Carpenter's work.

In explaining why directing a screen version of a King story was difficult, Wallace summarized, "Stephen King is so good with language that he can make almost anything sound incredibly scary. Some of King's images translate to film. Some are simply ethereal, like smoke."

A lot of Wallace's directing was influenced by films he worked on with John Carpenter, such as Halloween (1978) and The Fog (1980). He made several technical and staging decisions just to make each scene scarier or weird. These included interesting camera tricks, such as the Chinese restaurant scene being shot with a handheld camera; and shots where It goes through pipes filmed as if they were from It's point of view, a decision inspired by Wallace's past experiences working with Carpenter.

The Chinese restaurant sequence was shot in only one take and involved the actors not being aware what was going to happen so that "our expressions were all real," explained Reid. As Wallace explained, "The fortune cookie scene is an example of how to get great scare-power out of fairly humble, low-budget special effects. A trick table, puppeteers underneath, a handful of creepy little cookie models, a group of characters taken by surprise. So much depended on the details."

When it came to the Ms. Kersh scene, Wallace placed several incidental details, such as Mrs. Kersh's teeth being rotten like Pennywise's, to give the audience a clue something was up; the scene also ends with Beverly Marsh in the middle of the street, with intentionally no extras around to add to the creep factor. Wallace also chose to make the furniture in Stanley Uris' house odd to signify something being wrong with the character.

=== Special effects ===
Gene Warren's effects company Fantasy II were in the middle of working on Predator 2 (1990) when ABC assigned the company to work on It with a deadline of 12 weeks. The effects team of It included Warren, who handled the visual effects; Bart Mixon, who coordinated the makeup effects and Pennywise's animated deadlights; Jo-Anne Smith, who had previously worked on Curry's make-up for his role in Legend (1985); Salty Ray; J.C. Matalon; and the Fantasy II effects team run by Warren's son, Gene Warren Jr., and including Jim McLoughlln, Aaron Sim, Brent Baker, Norman Cabrera, and Joey Orosco. Fantasy II had previously worked on a feature also directed by Wallace titled Fright Night Part 2 (1988) and another King adaptation named Pet Sematary (1989).

The majority of the special effects were done practically without digital alteration, such as puppeteers being used to animate the fortune cookies in the Chinese restaurant scene. Some scenes were done with replacement animation, an animation technique similar to stop motion animation. Replacement animation was used for when Pennywise came out of the drain, killed Belch in the sewers, and did a somersault in the air. A lot of the effects Wallace planned to use while storyboarding did not make it into the final version for budget reasons, such as the roots writhing around Pennywise in his ghostly encounter with the adult Losers in the sewer. Lindsay Craig, an artist who made a living doing prop work in film and television, created some of the blood for It using food coloring, water, and methacyl.

While It's lair features many cocooned humans, Sally Ray and J.C. Matalon sculpted only six of them, four children and two adults, for close-up shots.

To work with the deadline, Mixon divided the design team of each It creature into four artists: "Each artist was given a considerable amount of freedom with his creations, with occasional input from Warren or myself to make sure we were adhering to Wallace's vision."

==== Pennywise ====
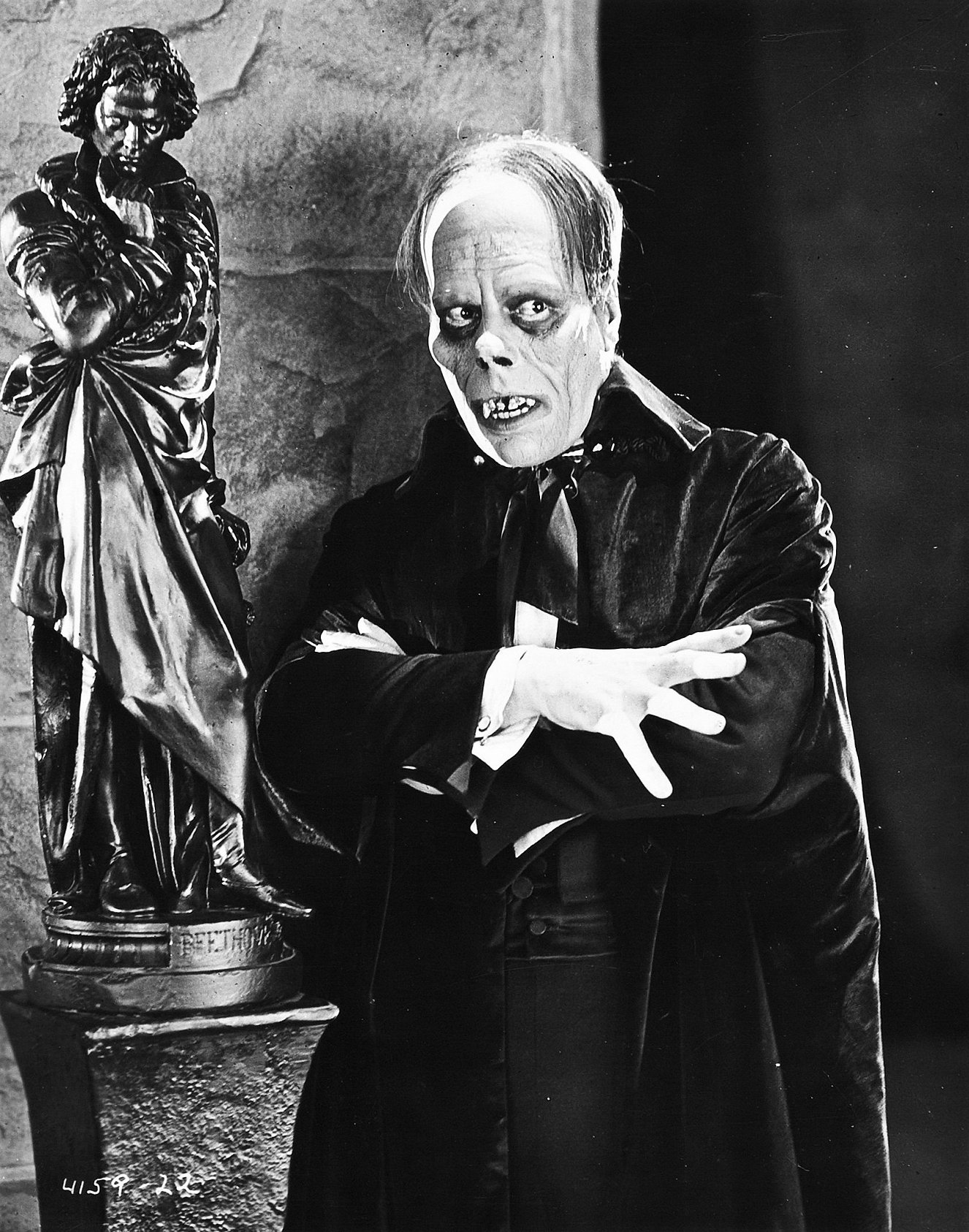
The appearance of Pennywise was based on Lon Chaney in The Phantom of the Opera (1925).

When designing Pennywise, Mixon focused on making him look as "friendly" as possible: "This creature is trying to lure children in, so he's not going to be a monster at first." He began drawing concepts for how Pennywise would look before Curry was cast, researching the looks of most other clowns in the process. Original storyboards for Pennywise featured exaggerated cheekbones, a sharp chin, and bulbous forehead.

The Losers Club watch as Pennywise goes down the drain after his head was cracked open. Multiple effect techniques can be seen in this shot, such as rotoscoping for Pennywise's deadlights, the incorporation of a stop-motion puppet into a live-action shot, and a visual of one of Mixon's original head designs for the clown that only can be seen on the puppet.

Mixon began working on a head cast for the Pennywise character after Curry was cast in the role; he also designed three clay molds for testing. According to Mixon, he based the shape of Pennywise's head on Lon Chaney in The Phantom of the Opera (1925), "stylized into a clown." Three different versions of the clown's face were created, one of which resembled a hobo clown, another that was "a little meaner," and the final one seen in the series.

Mixon then worked with Curry on the makeup and tested two concepts: one with just a nose, headpiece, and a make-up pattern Curry suggested; and another one that was closer to the original designs. The former was chosen, although the other make-up choice is featured in the final cut when Pennywise is sprayed with battery acid. Instead of traditional clown make-up, PAX paint was used for makeup that made Pennywise look "almost like a living cartoon."

According to director Wallace, "Tim [Curry] objected strongly to all the rubber. He had recently been in several movies which covered him in prosthetics and I'm sure he felt all the glue and latex would just get in his way. He was right, of course. With those eyes, and that mouth, and his crazy, sardonic sense of humor, less turned out to be more in the makeup department." However, the bulbous forehead was kept to give the character "a supernatural aspect without getting in the way." Getting the clown faces right also depended on some of the actor's own efforts, to the point where he had to do a day of training of not only getting into the character but also practicing the faces. Small adjustments to Pennywise's face, such as on his mouth and the eyebrows ("the hardest thing to get right" according to Curry), were still being made in the first five days of shooting.

In the scenes when the clown became vicious, Curry wore yellow lenses and two sets of sharp teeth throughout shooting: a smaller set he could talk while wearing, and a less flexible but far bigger set for more horrifying shots. The teeth were designed by Jim McLoughlin. Wallace originally did not want Pennywise to switch into a "horror" look but rather maintain the "nice" clown look throughout the miniseries, but this idea was dropped.

Dan Platt sculpted a puppet replication of Pennywise specifically for the stop motion scenes, with painting done by Mixon and the hair by Jack Bricker. Rotoscoping was used for Pennywise's "dead light" effects in the first part of the miniseries.

==== Werewolf ====
Norman Cabrera sculpted the design of the werewolf. Because Wallace did not want it to look like a usual "Howling type of creature," Mixon instructed Cabrera to make "a slicker, '90s version" of the wolf from the 1950s film Richie viewed. The makeup used for the werewolf character was kept simple, consisting only of a spandex hood mask, gloves, and hair tied around the neck all put together through KY Jelly; this was done to suit the limited application time and "the nature of the shots." Jack Bricker created the wolf's hair, and Mimi Cabrera made stylistic additions. Aaron Sims painted three sets of false eyes for the wolf; a "beauty pair" for close-up shots, a "stunt pair" that had the pupils "drilled out," and a set of glowing eyes. Only the "stunt" and "beauty" pairs are seen in the final miniseries.

==== Mrs. Kersh ====
For the part when Mrs. Kersh is revealed to be Alvin Marsh's corpse, Florence Peterson was still playing the character. Cabrera was responsible for the Marsh part of Kersh's make-up, composed of two face pieces, one teeth piece, false fingernail pieces, one neck piece, two pieces on the back of the hands, and an "empty eyesocket" piece. Mixon handled a PAX paint layer of the makeup. As Mixon explained, "Director Wallace wanted an empty eyesocket look for Al, so Cabrera sculpted rot inside the sockets and then burned tiny holes through the foam for the actor to see through."

==== Stanley's refrigerator head ====
The scene when the Losers find Stanley's severed head in the refrigerator was done via a split screen effect; it consists of one shot of Masur wearing a Jim-McLoughlin-designed "severed neck" with black areas filled in by another shot of the refrigerator without the actor. McLoughlin also created a dummy head of Stan used for wide shots.

==== The spider ====
I had a problem with the spider. King was able to conjure it up in his head, but it was difficult to bring to the screen. We set the tone and parameters in the first part of the movie with Pennywise. But when you get to the spider, you move into a different world. It was supposed to be a horror movie, not Jason and the Argonauts.

— Warren, 2015

Producing and shooting It's final spider form required a budget of $200,000 and 13 weeks of time. It began with Mixon coming up with the idea of a "soft and fleshy" spiderlike creature. Joey Orosco, with some help from Henry Mayo, used his idea to create a design that included the abdomen and multiple limbs of a spider; and shoulders, hips, and torso-attaching legs of a human; the body parts went through more than 16 concept sculptures. In addition to painting the entire creature, Orsco molded the torso, arms, and head; while the spider's legs and abdomen were sculpted by Sims. Sims also molded a stop-motion replica of the spider, with an armature built by Mike Joyce, used for nine split-screen, rear projection, and tabletop shots supervised by Warren.

As Wallace explained, the spider was far less "beefy and muscular" and more "lean and mean" than what was in the concept drawings; its face was also not supposed to be as visible as it was in the final cut, although he blames himself for letting that happen. As Mixon described the 500-pound, 250-foot radio-controlled spider, "They've had some other creatures on TV but I can't think of anything just this big or this neat." Its odd design and unusually large size caught the attention of Canadian customs officials when it reached the US-Canada border of White Rock during its relocation from Los Angeles to a sound stage at The Bridge Studios; the officials delayed the operation.

Brent Baker was inside the spider, previously going through three months of training in using it, where there was a video monitor showing him how the spider was moving: "It got a little stuffy, but they had a place where they could stick in a little hose if I wanted water or some fresh air." Baker got really uncomfortable when the spider had to do multiple shots of the roll-over movement, as he would have to lay on his side while the crew set up another shot. Dave Kindlon's mechanics of the spider required control by various operators for different body parts; the head was radio-controlled by three people, the legs were operated by six people, one person operated the arms, one handled the deadlights, and others handled the movement of the entire spider.

As Mixon described controlling the spider, "We used a certain amount of animatronics for the head, and the body had some of my crew members inside it. Once we got it into place, we couldn't move it around too much, because it was pretty unwieldy. For some reason, they shot it in super slow motion, so it's no wonder it looks like it's not moving! It was capable of more than what you saw onscreen."

The final spider figure disappointed both the cast and Wallace. On set, Thomas called the spider a "diva," Ritter mocked it as a "muppet from hell," and O'Toole recalled most of the cast calling it the "Alaskan king crab." King also disliked the spider, mocking it as "three Chevy headlights on the bottom of a wheelbarrow." The effects artists made touches after King revealed his disappointment during production.

As the producers were about to throw away the spider, Bart's father Tom rushed to Fantasy II to obtain it; as of January 1993, the spider resided in a Houston, Texas, warehouse owned by Bart's parents Tom and Barbara.

== Music ==
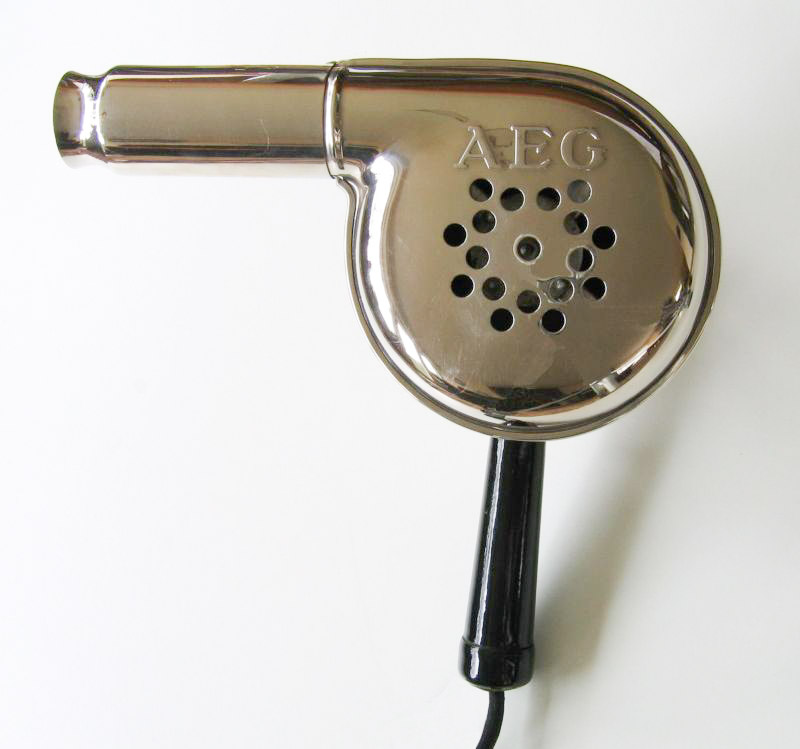
The use of a hair dryer gave Bellis the idea to use a major seventh as the first interval for It's title theme.

It was composer Richard Bellis' first score since his career "came to a screeching halt for some unknown reason" in 1984. He was in the fourth year of owning a woodwork business when getting the call to score the miniseries. The score took five weeks to compose and produce. Bellis recorded four-days worth of orchestra parts performed by various ensembles that had 55 players at most, and the electronic instruments were tracked at Ray Colcord's home studio.

Bellis' use of motifs and ostinatos in It were inspired by the works of Bernard Herrmann. The music features motifs of not only each Loser and Pennywise but also themes of nostalgia and the difference between the past and the present. In presenting the story's varied tone, the score mixes together adventurous orchestra motifs (especially so for the music of the last showdown between It and the Losers), horror synthesizer pieces, circus music, big band jazz, creepy sound design touches, and trumpet-heavy music accompanying the setting of Derry.

Bellis took a long time figuring out the first interval of the title theme, since he considered the use of a tritone overused in horror. Then, one day, he spontaneously chose the interval to be a major seventh after he heard it on the hairdryer he was using. The scrapbook seen in the title sequence influenced how he composed the theme: "I do remember being struck by the fact that it was not like other scrapbooks, filled with happy memories. The pages were sparse and the sequence mostly in black & white." The producers and Wallace initially intended The Temptations' cover of "The Way You Do the Things You Do" to be the title song, but it is instead played in the sequence where the Losers build a dam in the final cut.

The choice of calliope, drums, and bells for Pennywise's circus theme was obvious to Bellis; however, how he would use the bright-toned circus instruments was challenging in composing the theme for an evil clown. As Bellis described his thinking process, "Does the music have to be evil too? Besides, calliope music is usually very busy— I use this instrument as a scoring instrument or will that just be distracting? Maybe I can use it in a register lower than an actual calliope is capable of playing and just with single notes. And what about a sort of "demented" carousel? Maybe I can create something that uses my major seventh interval?"

In the beginning of It, Winterbarger sings "Itsy Bitsy Spider" while riding on a bike, which foreshadows the titular antagonist's spider form.

Wallace and the producers disliked the score (particularly the title music) according to Bellis.

The first release of the score was in February 1996, but only as a 16-minute suite on the album Richard Bellis: Film Music Volume 1. Then, a 2-CD release of the TV movie's complete score by Richard Bellis was released on November 15, 2011, by Intrada Records, and is volume 184 of the label's special collection. On October 31, 2016, Warner Brothers, as part of their Archive Collection Series, issued the score in a shorter, one-tracklist version on CD and Spotify. In 2017, Waxwork Records issued the entire score for the first time on vinyl. A six-minute suite of the score, along with a six-minute outtake recording of an orchestra session, can be heard on Bellis' website.

On October 18, 2016, guitarist Eric Calderone released his electric guitar cover of Bellis' circus theme for It.

=== Track listing ===
Disc 1
No.	Title	Length
1.	"Main Title"	1:52
2.	"Enter the Clown"	3:04
3.	"Georgie Dies"	4:17
4.	"Ben Gets the News"	0:51
5.	"Punks"	2:18
6.	"I Hate It Here"	1:53
7.	"Bedroom Jazz Source"	2:24
8.	"The Slap"	1:45
9.	"Die if You Try"	4:02
10.	"Richie's Talk Show Play-Off"	0:34
11.	"The Beast – First Encounter"	2:05
12.	"Mike Remembers"	0:58
13.	"Mike Joins the Group"	5:07
14.	"Pennywise"	0:39
15.	"Circus Source"	1:10
16.	"Target Practice"	2:51
17.	"The Sewer Hole"	3:13
18.	"Stan Gets Nabbed"	4:27
19.	"The Fog"	3:25
20.	"The Pact"	1:43
21.	"Stan's Suicide"	0:50
22.	"End Credits I"	1:00
Total length:		50:28

Disc 2
No.	Title	Length
1.	"Main Title Part II"	1:51
2.	"The Graves"	1:48
3.	"Library Balloons"	2:53
4.	"Ben's Flashback"	0:35
5.	"Skeleton on the Pond"	0:40
6.	"Guillory's Muzak"	1:27
7.	"Hydrox"	2:49
8.	"Audra"	1:45
9.	"Fortune Cookie"	1:54
10.	"Silver Flyer"	2:22
11.	"Leftover Stan"	1:52
12.	"Henry and Belch"	2:20
13.	"Every Thirty Years"	1:56
14.	"Audra Arrives"	2:02
15.	"This Time It's for Real"	4:26
16.	"The Smell of Death"	1:59
17.	"Something's Coming"	4:00
18.	"The Spider's Web"	5:11
19.	"Hi Ho Silver"	4:33
20.	"End Credits Part II"	1:00
Total length:		47:23

== It's content in relation to television restrictions ==
You'll know that this is no slasher film where stupid teenagers almost volunteer to be victims and bleed all over the screen. This is the terror of the unnatural, delivered by threats and special effects, not by corpses.

— John Hanauer, 1990

AllMovie suggested It pushed the television barriers not only with its amount of blood, but also with its themes of child endangerment.

As It was a television production, its content had to follow Broadcast Standards and Practices. This limited the amount of violence, gore, and blood displayed, and how it was presented. For instance, since blood could not come out of body orifices, blood instead had to come out of physical objects such as sinks and photo books. Mixon re-called that, when designing the skeleton Ben encountered, ABC did not want the skeleton to be wet and have muscles hanging off of it. However, the skeleton was supposed to be wet as it had just emerged from a river. To get around the problem, Mixon decided to replace the skeleton meat with seaweed. As Mixon explained, "They just didn't want any [wet] gore, although rot and decay was okay." The biggest broadcast rule the makers of It had to loophole around was not to show kids in jeopardy, which was a major issue as kids facing deadly situations was a prominent theme of the story. An example of this is Georgie's death; he could not have his arm shown to be ripped off, so it had to only be implied through dialogue.

The censorship It dealt with made it more of a psychological horror product, something different from most popular horror productions at the time. Most of this horror is executed through the titular villain and the scared expressions of the Losers Club actors. Philip Rosenthal wrote that in order to be scared of It, "it is necessary to embrace the fantasy that such an evil entity could exist and cloud minds the way It does." The lack of graphic content It could display also resulted its story to be very character-orientated for its genre. Like the original novel, It deals with multiple themes related to childhood: children's safety issues, trauma adults unconsciously place on kids, the importance of friendship, and childhood fears that continue into adulthood. The Losers face problems of bullying, abusive parenting, racism, and lack of adult attention to the sudden increase of child deaths. They are connected as outsiders dealing with similar levels of traumatic situations, and they work together to overcome those traumatic feelings by defeating "It," a symbol of their inner fears.

It also features comic touches to its otherwise scary plot and was labeled by a 2019 retrospective review as being a campy production for its "fake-looking" It forms, the over-the-top performances of the main cast, and bizarre story elements, such as adults being terrified by balloons. Curry's performance of Pennywise is also cited as a reason for unintentional hilarity, as it combines horror, black comedy, and cheeriness. In addition to his odd methods of transportation, such as popping out of sinks, storm drains, and shower heads, Pennywise appears and acts like a regular circus clown, instead of a malevolent extraterrestrial being. However, this very appearance in combination with his evil acts is recognized as the major element of terror in the miniseries.

== Reception ==
=== Broadcast ===
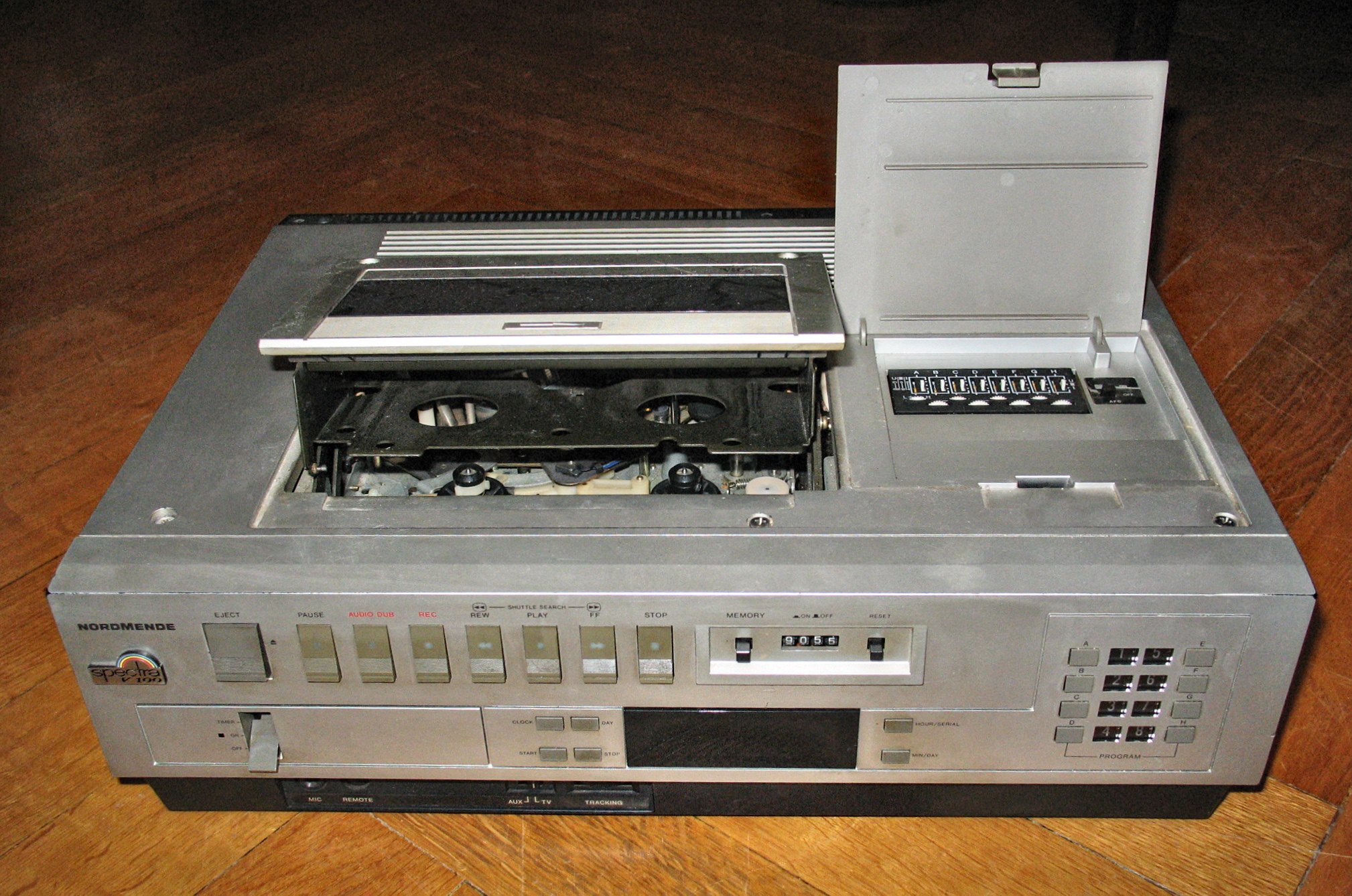
Part Two of It was the most VCR-recorded television production of November 1990.

ABC originally did not want King seeing the footage of It until after it was broadcast; however, the author threatened the network that he would not do any promotional interviews if he did not see it first. King explained in a September 1990 Fangoria interview that he had seen the first hour of the miniseries, and that the rest was currently being edited. His reasoning for checking on the miniseries' progress was, "It's my damn book and I worked on it for three years."

It was initially planned to air on ABC in May 1990 before being moved to the "sweeps month" of November, specifically the nights of November 18 and November 20. That weekend, It and other network programs had to contend with many cut-ins of coverage of president George H. W. Bush's European trips, such as meetings with Václav Havel and Helmut Kohl; and his visit with troops in the Persian Gulf.

Just before the broadcast, a variety of predictions were made by television writers about how big It's ratings would be. Journalist Janos D. Froelich analyzed the final product of It as looking cheaper than ABC's previous sweeps month big events, which made her less faithful about it being successful. Mike Drew suggested that while the star power could increase the miniseries' chances of succeeding, its content was "probably too tamed-down by TV requirements" to gain its primary target horror demographic. However, Joan Hanauer suggested the program would be "a natural ratings grabber" for its "good clean horror fun," and Greg Paeth forecasted that it could bring in curious King fans.

It turned out to be the biggest success of 1990 for Capital Cities, owner of ABC, garnering nearly 30 million viewers over its two-night premiere. Part 1 was the fifth highest rated program of the week with an 18.5/29 rating/share, and being watched in 17.5 million households. Part 2 was the second highest rated program of the week with a 20.6/33 rating/share, and watched in 19.2 million households. During a time when recording television programs on tape with VCR was becoming a commonly-practiced activity in family homes, the second part of It was the most taped program of the month of November, with 1.96 million tape machines detected by A.C. Nielsen to be recording it. In a year where traditional television films like Decoration Day (1990) and The Incident (1990) garnered the most viewers, It was the only non-safe fare on 1990 to obtain the high ratings it received.

In France, the miniseries aired on M6 on October 16, 1993, under the title Il est revenu, French for He Came Back. When it aired on BBC One in the United Kingdom in 1994, part one garnered 6.6 million viewers; and the second part became the eleventh-most viewed program of the period of May 29 to August 14, 1994, by attracting 7.6 million watchers.

=== Pre-broadcast reviews ===
Television experts reported "rave" and not-so-fond reviews of It from television critics. Farrell Peter The Oregonian honored It as "the best horror show ever made for network television, and among the better miniseries of any genre offered this year," praising its multi-layered story and performances. Some critics called it one of the far better King films. The Cincinnati Post labeled it "one of the creepiest productions put together for broadcast TV" (although opined it to be nothing more than for "thrills and chills"), and the St. Louis Post-Dispatch writer Eric Mink cherished it as "a gripping, bloody horror romp that will leave most of your major muscle groups aching from long stretches of constant tension." Matt Roush of USA Today categorized It as "the mini-series equivalent of those Saturday matinee shockers that merrily warped a generation before Freddy and Jason began stalking their more graphic turf." Both David Zurawik of The Baltimore Sun and Ron Miller of the Press-Telegram enjoyed It for working both as a straightforward scary miniseries and a very deep story, Zurawik highlighting its many "finely crafted" mythic and religious undertones.

Some critics highlighted its priority on character development over the typical horror traits of blood and gore, Richmond elaborating it was "all the more disturbing and believable by the fact that we are forced to care about these people as individuals." Many reviewers spotlighted some of the scare moments of the miniseries, often using the Chinese restaurant sequence as an example. Particularly appreciated in some reviews was the miniseries' horrification of everyday objects and scenarios, such as shower heads and photo galleries. Times Union writer Steve Bornfeld recommended it for its freaky visuals and "effective cast," particularly Curry: "With his razor-sharp teeth and bloody balloons, Curry delicately balances clown-like cheer and pure evil, exploiting the freak show side of clowns that can terrify children." Julia Keller of The Columbus Dispatch applauded the "solid production values" and "crisp direction," where "each moment is crafted and distinct as, layer upon chilly layer, an edifice of terror is painstakingly created." Reviewers also described the special effects as "exceptionally effective," "jaw-dropping," and "rival[ing] anything you've seen on the big screen."

However, many writers also panned It's long length and padding, The Washington Times writer Rick Martin criticizing its lack of scary moments over a four-hour running time. The Miami Herald critic Hal Boedeker wrote that It was padded with the leads dickering around with confronting It, as if it was "a monster movie without the heroes confronting "the thing;"" and "trite" and "tasteless" dialogue, such as slurs targeted toward the black Mike and the Jewish Stan. Virginia Mann of The Record attributed the long length to the story's repetitive structure, where there are multiple scenes involving one Loser encountering the same villain: "After a while, even the scary stuff starts to seem silly." Some reviewers also criticized its out-of-nowhere undeveloped subplots and unexplained concepts, such as the lack of explanation for why only the Loser Clubs and none of the other adults see It's incarnations. Martin noted one plot error in particular: "[Bill] still feels responsible for his kid brother's being snatched by Ronald McDeath, and though he wasn't there at the time manages a detailed flashback of his brother's last moments." Some reviewers felt the miniseries failed to capture King's horror style, one of them included Dusty Saunders; he wrote that its terror was not "unrelenting" enough, as some of "the scenes and the special effects come across as routine, familiar work from predictable monster movies." He also was an outlier in dismissing the character of Pennywise, writing that he "comes across as a berserk, somewhat laughable circus character."

==== Part one ====
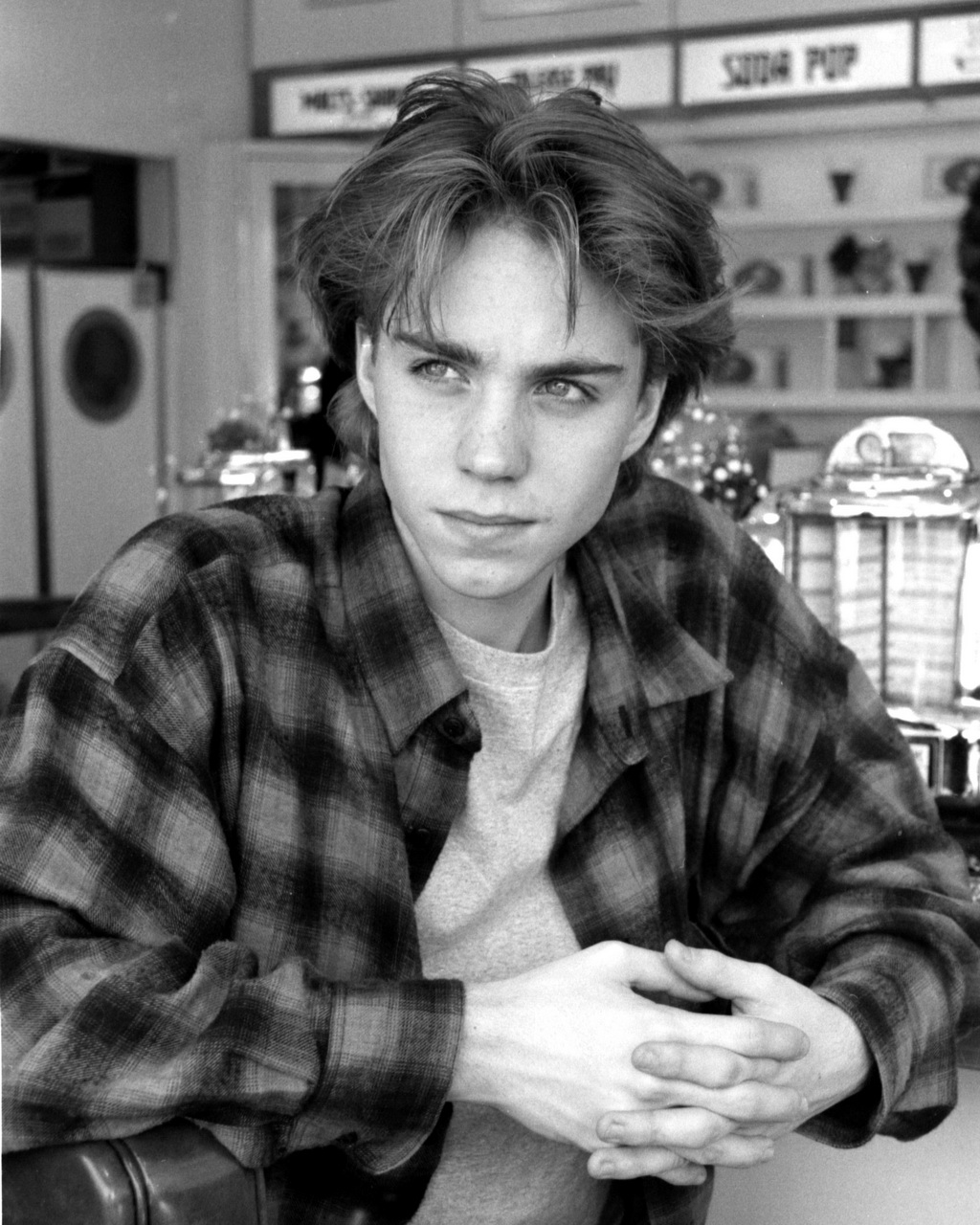
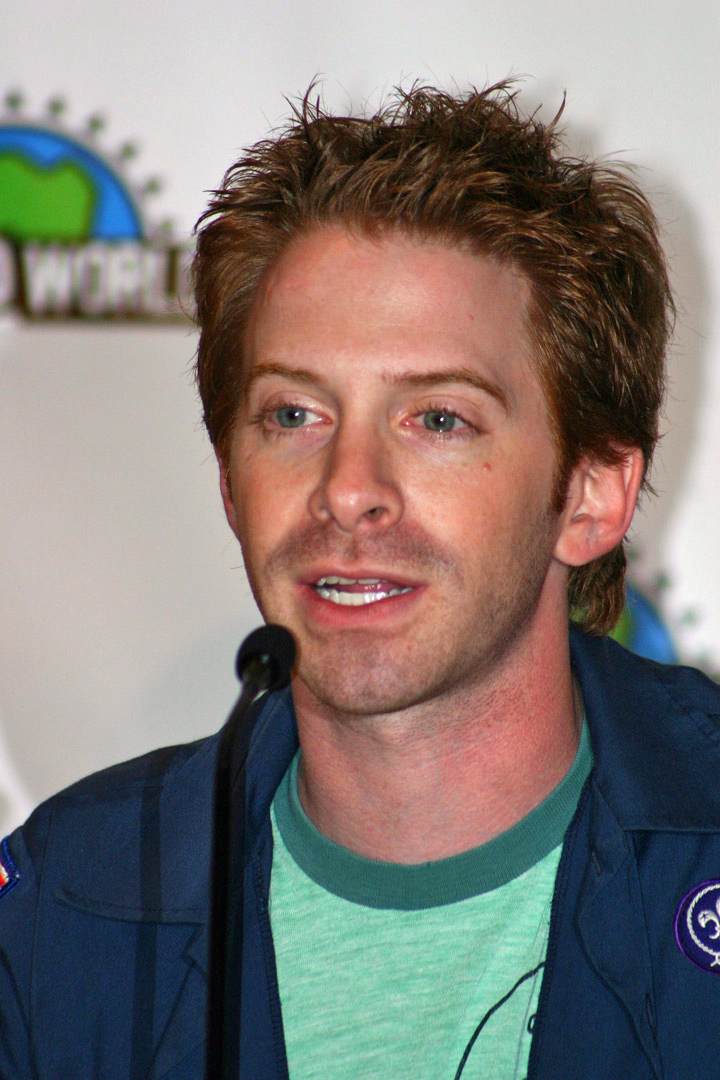
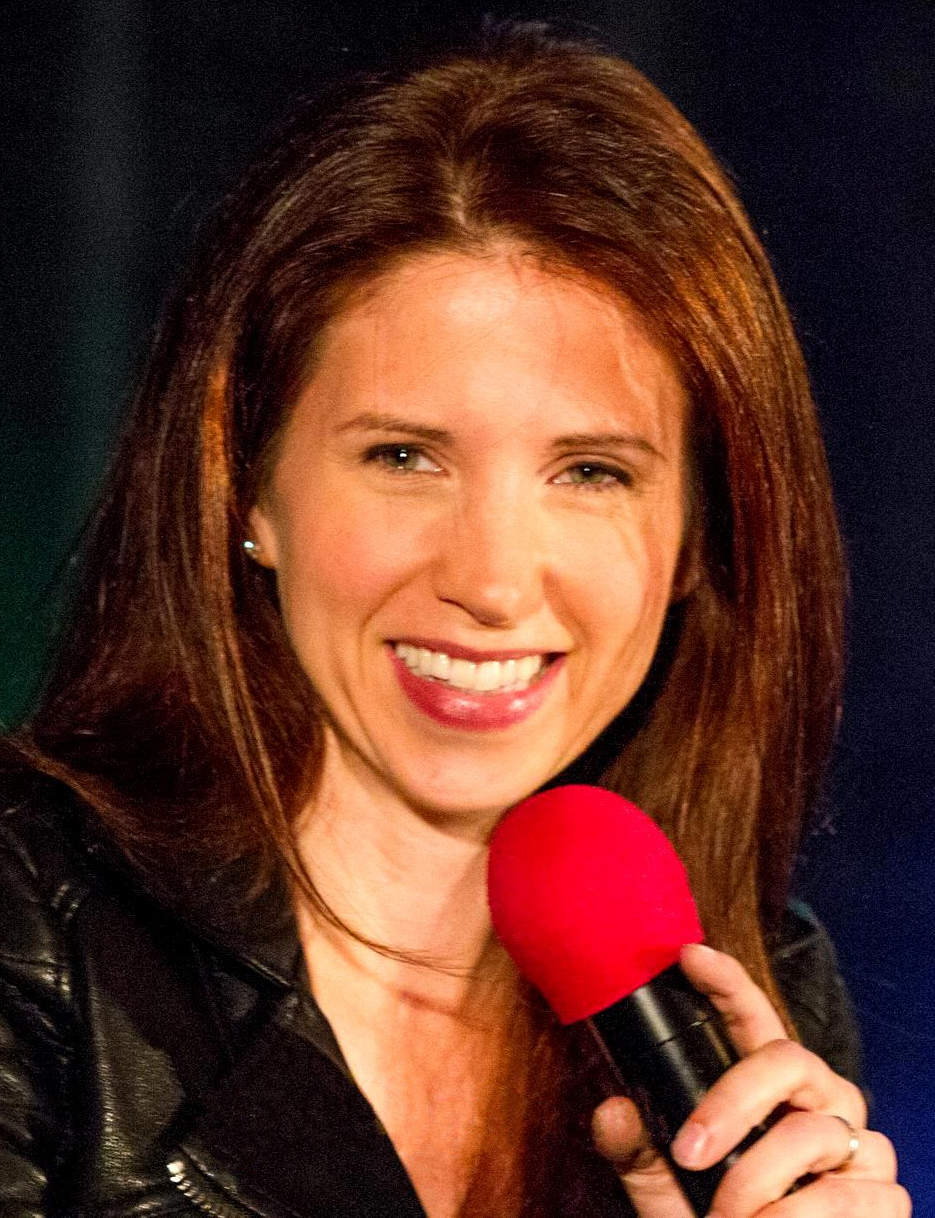
It's child cast, which included Jonathan Brandis (left), Seth Green (middle), and Emily Perkins (right), garnered praise from reviewers.

The most praise came towards the series' first part, a common highlight being the performances of the child actors and its development of the Losers. Jonathan Storm described Crane as "awkward but adorable" and Perkins as having "a subtlety to the role that belies her years; her sidelong stare can be full of fear one second, contempt the next."

The part had the most "impact" of the miniseries because it focused on children, a very "vulnerable" demographic of people, analyzed The San Diego Union writer Robert P. Laurence. Ed Bark of The Dallas Morning News wrote that, "We yearn to recapture what they had, and we also wince at the indignities they endured as members of their self-proclaimed "Losers' Club.'" Tim Funk of The Charlotte Observer explained, "Watching them, we can't help but recall our own childhood hurts and fears. But we're also reminded what a soothing salve friendship was."

Keller wrote the Losers' bonding "never lurch into the sentimental, but are deeply, powerfully moving all the same," also finding the back-and-forth flashback technique to be the miniseries' "most effective" aspect. However, Bodeker was less favorable towards the story's presentation of juvenile endangerment, made only more "distasteful" by its "hack filmmaking." Mink also called the introduction to the adult losers in the first part "ridiculously trite" and Bodeker a "monotonous" setup.

==== Part two ====
The second part garnered more criticism, a recurring con being the adult actors. Laurence opined the adult actors were "more willing to accept the story on its own terms," thus making the second half less interesting. Storm explained that the adult characters' "foolish" and "spoiled" behavior made their problems look more "trivial" than their younger counterparts, and called their activities less "interesting" as well: "The adults just sit around and eat Chinese food or whine through strange attempts at romance."

Mal Vincent felt the adult characters unintentionally looked like "psychopaths" seeing It's mind images, but also liked the performers of the grown-ups more than most other critics: "they do manage, just as importantly, to suggest camaraderie and friendship which, considering they are mostly stars of competing TV series, is an achievement in itself." He also called the premise of adults keeping to a vow they held for thirty years to kill a monster "silly." Chapman called Christopher's performance of Eddie "embarrassing," while Tucker panned Thomas' performance for being more like his character for The Waltons than a horror novelist. Funk opined the miniseries' final half to be somewhat inferior for being "a bit silly at key points," and Tucker disfavored the second part's predictable plot.

The ending of the miniseries garnered the most disappointment with critics, even those most favorable toward the miniseries. Bark dismissed it as a "hokey, feel-good" resolution, Keller called it "trite," and Chapman described it as a "cop-out" as it ruined the "epic mind game" notion of It being in the characters' heads. It's spider form was particularly derided, called by Chapman a "cheap Alien imitation," described by Mann "as if it crawled out of a low-budget Japanese monster movie," and by the Richmond Times-Dispatch "more laughable than frightening."

=== Accolades ===
It was ranked the tenth best television miniseries/film in 1990 by the Orange County Register; and USA Today honored Pennywise the best television clown of 1990, alongside Homey the Clown from In Living Color. Bellis won the Primetime Emmy Award for Outstanding Achievement in Music Composition for a Miniseries or a Special (Dramatic Underscore) for his score for It, the first time a composer won the award for a horror production. David Blangsted and Robert F. Shugrue were nominated for the Primetime Emmy Award for Outstanding Editing for a Single-Camera Miniseries or Special, losing to the Hallmark film Sarah, Plain and Tall (1991). Blangsted and Shugrue did, however, win an Eddie Award for Best Edited Television Work on a Miniseries. Crane was nominated for a Youth in Film award for "Best Young Actor Starring in a TV Movie, Pilot, or Special," but lost to Stephen Dorff in Always Remember I Love You. It was nominated for a People's Choice Award for Favorite TV Mini-Series, being defeated by The Civil War (1990).

== Later years ==
=== Home media ===
It was released on VHS and LaserDisc in 1991. Warner Home Video released the VHS version in the United Kingdom on August 22, 1991; Samhain, Britain's longest running horror magazine, promoted it with a five-copy giveaway for readers who sent in when the original novel was published. In January 1992, a high-quality, digital-stereo LaserDisc version of It was released in Japan. On February 10, 1993, Warner Home Video released two VHS versions of It: a standard-play-speed set consisting of two tapes, as 193 minutes was too much time for a standard play tape to hold; and a one-tape, lower-quality, extended play-speed version. Houston Chronicle writer Bruce Westbrook considered this a questionable business decision for Warner: The versions were being sold at a high rental price ($79.99); and many retailers were un-equipped to display "cumbersome two-tape" products or worried about customers not wanting to rent a long two-tape set for just one night. The VHS and LaserDisc releases feature It as originally aired. In 1998, It was re-released on VHS on a single cassette tape and was altered, removing the end credits from part 1 and the opening credits of part 2. These edits carried over to all future releases of the miniseries. Warner Home Media released the miniseries on Blu-ray in 2016 and 2018.

=== Retrospective opinion and legacy ===
While the climax may be somewhat unavoidably unsatisfying, it is nostalgically remembered for its strengths, including its unforgettably gruesome Pennywise portrayal, its memorably shocking moments of on-screen visceral horror [...] and its thoroughly convincing portrayal of camaraderie from both generations of the Losers Club.

— SciFiNow, 2015

Stephen King's It is considered by most fans to be the most terrifying made-for-television horror film of all time.

— HorrorHound, 2009

More time and more money would've helped in the visual effects department, but I think we did okay with what we had, and what we had, above all else, was a brilliant cast and brilliant material. Stephen King and I corresponded after the fact, and he felt as I did about the show's strengths and weaknesses, but overall was very complimentary.

— Wallace, 2015

As of July 2026, on Rotten Tomatoes, the miniseries holds an approval rating of 70% based on 69 reviews. The site's consensus reads, "Though hampered by an uneven second half, It supplies a wealth of funhouse thrills and an idelible turn from Tim Curry as Pennywise." On Metacritic, it has a weighted average score of 79 out of 100 based on reviews from nine critics, indicating "generally favorable" reviews. It topped The New York Observer's 2014 list of the best Stephen King miniseries; the source explained that while it was "two hours too long," it was still the scariest King miniseries of all time. Complex called it the scariest horror film of 1990, noting its "manipulative" horror as well the relationships of the Losers: "The camaraderie and shared history of It's protagonists stir feelings of warm nostalgia in viewers—which makes it all the more horrifying every time Pennywhistle pops up."

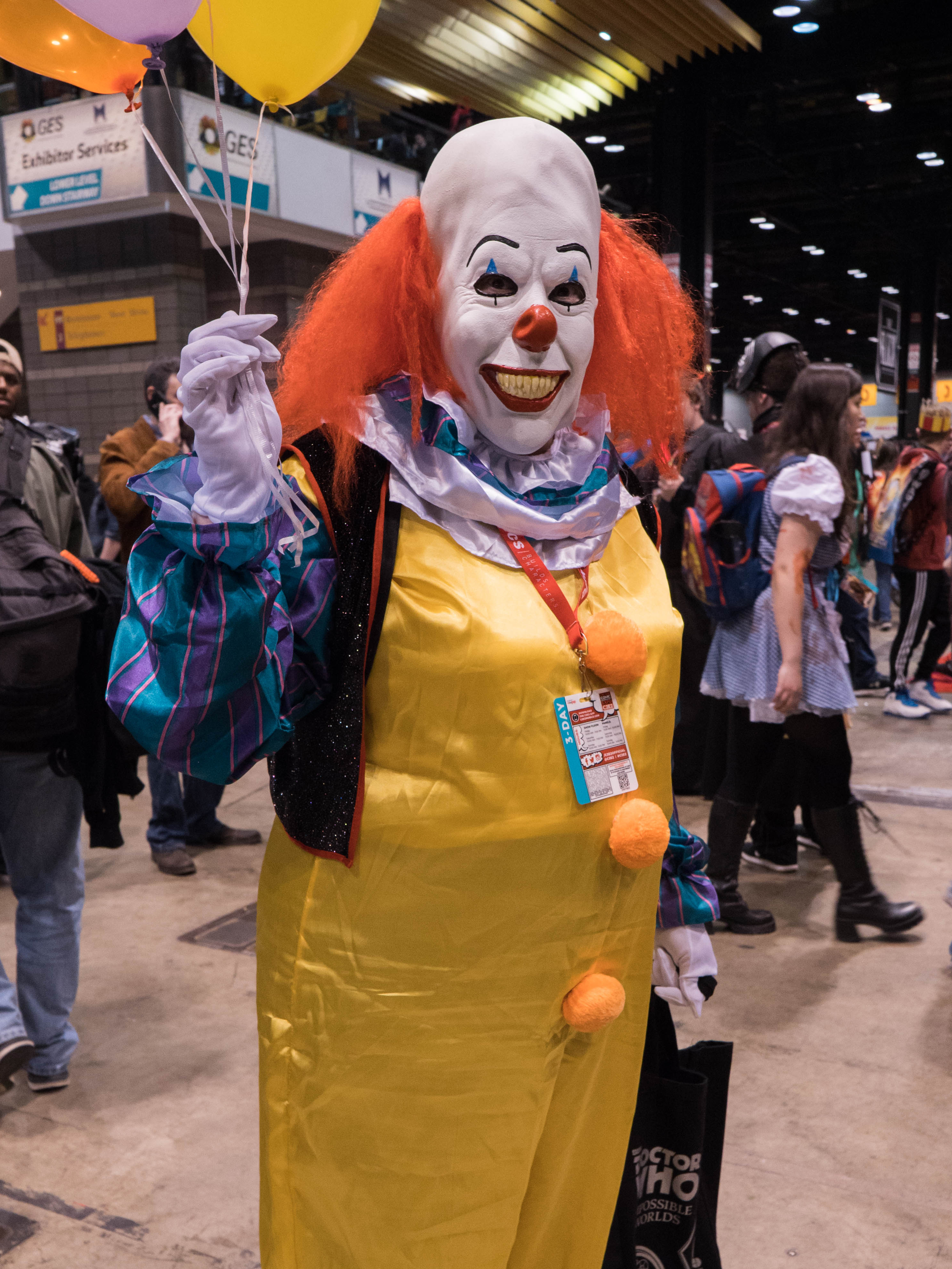
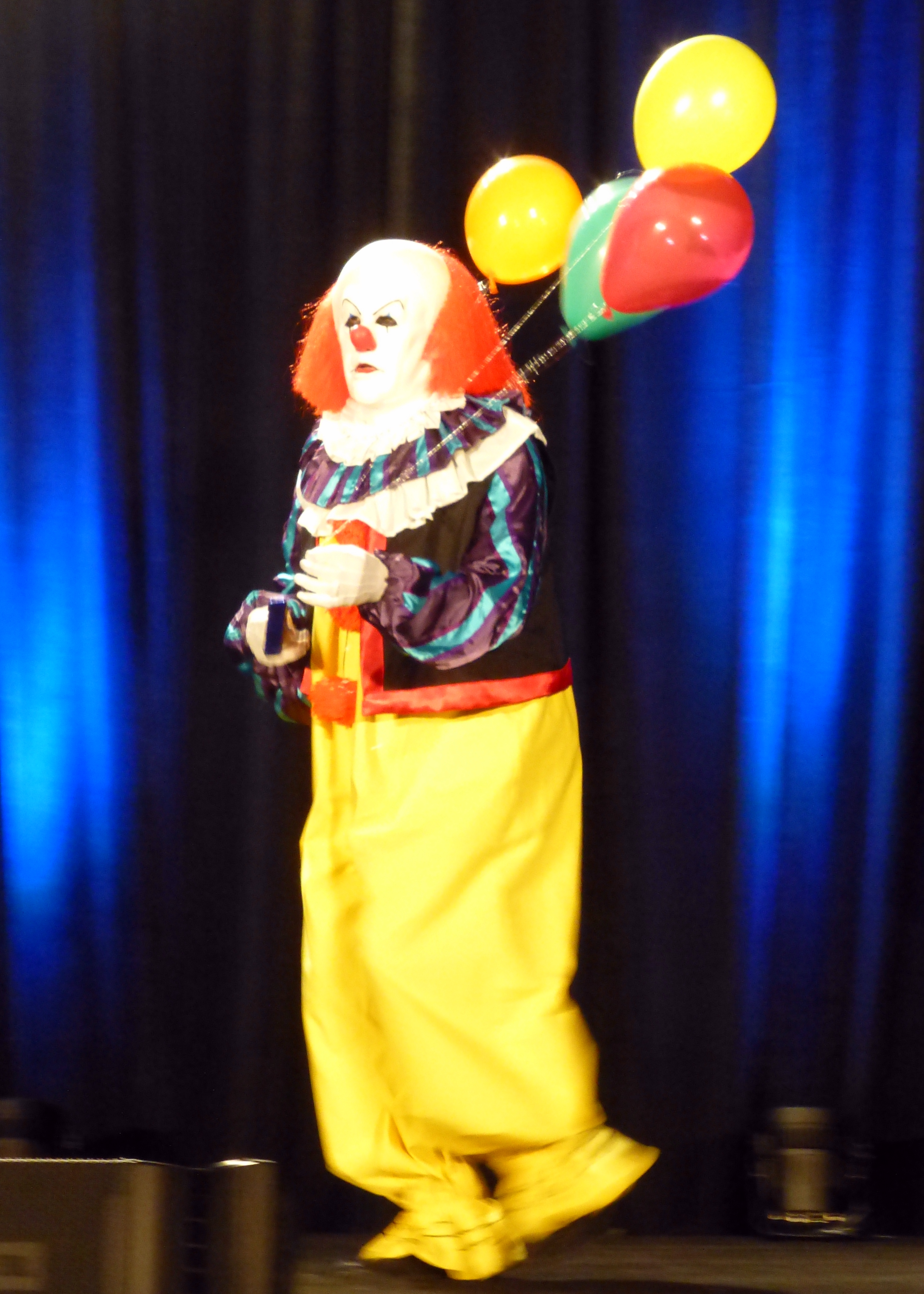
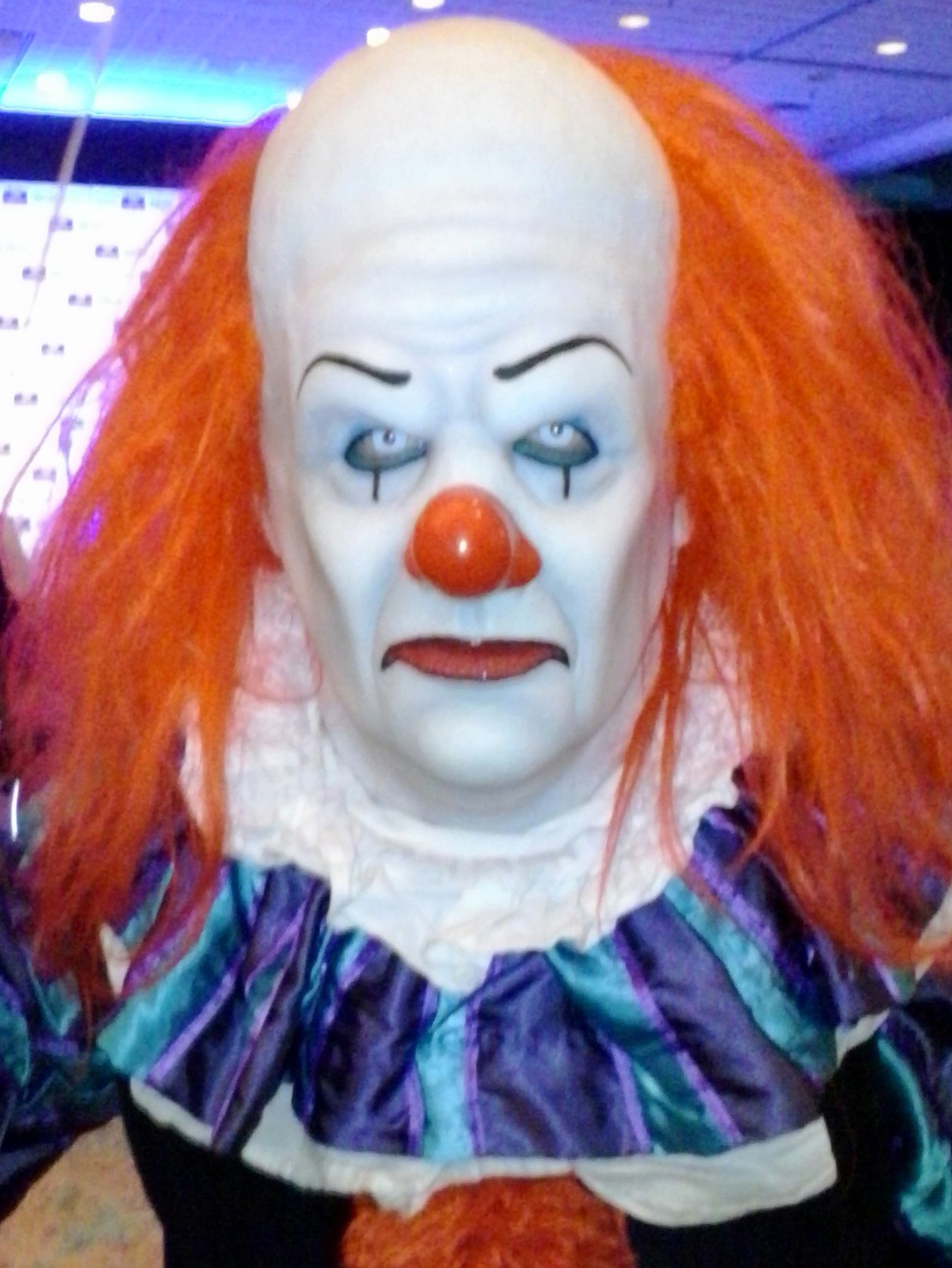
Convention photos of various cosplays of Curry's Pennywise, which has been the main reason for the miniseries' cult following according to writer James Smythe.

Many retrospective pieces have spotlighted Curry's version of Pennywise, being called by several publications and scholars as one of the most terrifying clown characters in film and television. In fact, it is "widely considered the archetype of the [evil clown] genre," wrote Jessica Glenza. As The Atlantic summarized the terror of the performance and character, "He speaks in a kind of singsongy, guttural growl, his teeth are sharp fangs, and the contrast between his comical yellow dungarees and his penchant for ripping off children's limbs is fairly stark." Rolling Stone writer Sean T. Collins described it as "the stuff sleepless nights are made of. He gloats, he giggles, he taunts, he devours the scenery like the monster himself devours middle-schoolers – and he generally sears his way right into the brain of the viewer."

Collins and James Smythe of The Guardian claimed the miniseries to have a cult status, Smythe using Curry's portrayal as the main reason: "To this day, it's Pennywise that people turn to if you ask them to picture a scary clown. Far more people than ever read the book have seen pictures of Curry's Pennywise, or have watched clips, or remember their siblings forcing them to watch it with them." Curry's portrayal of the character turned him into a horror icon. As Bloody Disgusting explained, "His mixture of pleasant charm with gleeful terror has cemented the character in our minds, filling our slumbers with nightmares." In 2015, the source ranked his version of the clown the best Stephen King villain. Perkins recalled being at Hal-Con "and a lot of people wanted to talk about It with me, especially women who really loved Beverly and wanted to be her because they felt like an outcast, and saw her as a character with a lot of strength."

However, the other parts of the miniseries have faced more divided opinions. Smythe, while finding the miniseries enjoyable overall, also found the writing to be "clunky" and the other performances to be "soapy." Sandra Harris of Moviepilot noted the miniseries' "gorgeous scenery" and "nice interweaving of flashbacks with the regular scenes," while Ian Jane of DVD Talk and John Campopiano of Bloody Disgusting praised the combination of childhood nostalgia with horror elements. Dan Stephens from the UK website Top 10 Films praised the first part of the miniseries for its story, character development, and suspense. However, he found the second part disappointing, disliking the lack of "friendship and togetherness" of the main characters that was present during the first part as well as the clichéd ending. The Mary Sue critic Kate Gardner appreciated It for its camp value, but was disappointed with how the miniseries rejected the "character study" aspects of the novel to fit the three-hour running time. Rozsa was also one of the few reviewers to dislike the child performers, describing their line delivery as "unconvincing."

Jonathan Barkin, in a 2016 review, wrote that the first part, while the best of the miniseries, suffered from "awkward attempts to tie everything together," where what is only shown is "the smallest of snippets and there aren't really any solid connecting lines." He also panned the second part for padding it with uninteresting presentations of the adult Losers. His overall criticisms includes its flashback structure and cheap television look, especially when it came to the spider and the "lazy" choice of close-up shots for Pennywise's scary faces.

There have been several internet memes using gifs of the scene where Pennywise meets Georgie.

While King has admitted to enjoying the miniseries, calling it a "really ambitious adaptation of a really long book;" Wallace, who only read the novel years after finishing It, stated in 2003 that he found the miniseries to be inferior to its source material. In 2015, however, he stated that he "was, and am, very, very proud of It."

It's commercial success began a wave of miniseries adaptations of Stephen King works, such as The Tommyknockers (1993), another miniseries where Cohen wrote the script; Rose Red (2002), and 11.22.63 (2016). It also was a heavy part of ABC's later decisions of allowing King to write screenplays of miniseries versions of his works, such as The Stand (1994) and The Shining (1997).

=== In other media ===
In 2013, Pennywise made an appearance in an advertisement for organic food company Herbaria that was produced by Andreas Roth with Jung von Matt/Neckar and Tempomedia.

The two-part late 2010s film version of It (Chapter One and Chapter Two) feature references to the miniseries. A doll replica of Curry's Pennywise is seen in Chapter One in the scene where Richie encounters a room of clown dolls in the house on Neibolt Street; the doll was also included in the film's trailer. Chapter Two not only features a cameo from Crane, but also Pennywise (portrayed by Bill Skarsgård) reiterating the miniseries line "Kiss me, fat boy" (though in a less comical fashion) and the designs of the clownhouse's clown bags having the same pattern as the attire of Curry's Pennywise. Skarsgård stated in an interview about the miniseries, "I watched the whole thing, and...it's cute. It's very dated, you know?" The 2017 film's Henry Bowers actor Nicholas Hamilton and editor Jason Ballantine admitted to using the miniseries as reference when working on the 2017 version.

=== Documentary and short film ===
In May 2017, an Indiegogo campaign was created for Pennywise: The Story of IT, an independent documentary film about the production and lasting impact of the It miniseries. The project met its crowdfunding goal in June 2017, with production beginning the following month. The film, directed by Chris Griffiths and produced by John Campopiano and Gary Smart, will feature interviews with members of the miniseries' cast and crew, including Tim Curry, Tommy Lee Wallace, Bart Mixon, Seth Green, Richard Thomas, and Emily Perkins. From October 27 to October 28, 2018, at the Scotiabank Convention Centre's 2018 Frightmare in the Falls event, Campopiano held an exhibit of the props, costumes, memorabilia, and behind-the-scenes of It to promote the documentary. On February 22, 2019, an extended trailer for the film was uploaded to YouTube. The documentary had its world premiere at the Sitges Film Festival on October 15, 2021, and premiered in select theaters on July 8 and digital formats on July 26, 2022. It was first released on DVD and Blu-ray in the UK on October 24, 2022, and then released worldwide on November 22, 2022. The documentary was met with mixed reviews with That's Pop Culture rating it three out of five stars, saying, "A solid documentary that doesn't quite have the IT factor". Robert Martin for Starburst remarked that, "there's nothing exciting or unusual about the telling of the story - it's a very standard documentary indeed. It's the subject matter only which keeps the interest and that’ in itself is fascinating." giving it 4 out of 5. The Reviews Hub website added, "Without much drama to keep it running, and a bloated running time of over two hours, Pennywise: The Story of It dilutes any interesting nuggets in a sea of trite interviews.". Composer Sean Schafer Hennessy wrote the music for the documentary, which was released digitally on July 8, 2022.

In August 2018, it was announced that Pennywise: The Story of IT co-producer Campopiano was producing a short alternate history sequel film to the miniseries titled Georgie. The short, directed by Ryan Grulich, features Tony Dakota reprising his role as Georgie Denbrough from the It miniseries, and centers on the idea of how the narrative could have continued had Georgie not been killed by Pennywise. The short also features Ben Heller, who portrayed young Stanley Uris in the miniseries. On August 27, 2018, a teaser trailer for Georgie was uploaded to YouTube. The short premiered at the Boston Underground Film Festival on March 22, 2019, and made its debut online on June 10, 2019, on the Fangoria Facebook page.

=== Merchandise ===
From May 22 to May 29, 2015, the company Horror Decor sold Pennywise dolls as part of their Killer Carnival Punks collection that also featured doll versions of the clown from Poltergeist (1982) and Gunther from The Funhouse (1981).

Factory Entertainment has released several products based on the miniseries: a lunchbox, a 15" Premium Motion Statue of Pennywise with an audio card playing some of Curry's lines, and a plush doll of the clown. The company's Pennywise figure and lunchbox was previewed at the 2017 American International Toy Fair. As part of Mezco Toyz' Living Dead Dolls line, the company sold copies of a 10" doll replication of Pennywise from November 2017 to January 2018.

On July 25, 2017, HalloweenCostumes.com, in collaboration with Hollywood effects company Immortal Masks, produced and released a 100%-silicone mask of the 1990 version of Pennywise, selling it at a very high price of $899.99.

On February 16, 2018, the National Entertainment Collectibles Association released various toys of the miniseries' Pennywise, such as a 2" tall scaler mini of Pennywise, an 8" bobble head of the character, a 6.5" battery-powered Pennywise that moves when exposed to light. The next day (per customer requests), it released a 7" "ultimate" action figure of Pennywise that featured interchangeable hands and four heads as well as balloons and a paper boat for the character to hold. Two more Pennywise figures were released exactly a year later: a second version of the figure that added three new interchangeable heads, a three-dimensional "emerging hand" book object, and a balloon featuring text saying "Turn Back Now;" and a 6" figure of a Saturday morning cartoon-style design of the clown, included as part of a collection that included similar-looking cartoon figures of Freddy Krueger, Jason Voorhees, and the 2017 film version of Pennywise. In January 2020, NECA released an 8" "clothed action figure" of Pennywise where he'll wear a sewed version of his costume; it had two interchangeable heads and interchangeable hands that includes glove and monster hands.

In March 2020, Japanese company Kotobukiya, as the first product of their Dokodemo horror statue series, released a 3" ARTFX figure that replicates It's shower scene, specifically the part when Pennywise comes out of the drain.

=== Adaptations ===
In 1998, a 52-episode Indian television adaptation of the miniseries, Woh, was broadcast.

In September 2004, The WB announced a two-hour telefilm remake of the It miniseries written by Peter Filardi and produced by Mark Wolper, both of whom had previously worked on the 2004 version of Salem's Lot. On June 7, 2006, the plan for the project changed into a four-hour miniseries remake of the 1990 adaptation that would air on The Sci-Fi Channel. There were no further announcements.

== See also ==
- Gingerclown (2013), another production starring Curry as an evil clown
- The Steadfast Tin Soldier, a 1992 adaptation of which by Hanna-Barbera also featured Curry in a clown role
