= Living Doll =

Living Doll(s) may refer to:

== Film and television ==
- The Living Doll (1908 film) (French: La Poupée vivante), short silent film by Georges Méliès
- "Living Doll" (The Twilight Zone), 1963 episode of American TV series The Twilight Zone
- Living Doll, 1970 Filipino film starring Tony Ferrer
- Living Dolls (TV series), 1989 American sitcom
- Living Dolls: The Making of a Child Beauty Queen, 2001 American TV documentary
- "Living Doll" (CSI), 2007 episode of American TV series CSI: Crime Scene Investigation

== Music ==
- "Living Doll" (song), by Lionel Bart, performed by Cliff Richard

== See also ==
- Haunted doll, a doll or stuffed animal purported to be cursed or possessed in some way
- My Living Doll, American TV sitcom in 1964–65
- Living Dead Dolls, 1998 line of American horror dolls
