= Cinema of Fear =

Horror movie–based toy line

Cinema Of Fear was a toy line of action figures, plush dolls, "screen grab" dioramas, and limited edition toys manufactured by Mezco Toyz based on New Line's horror franchises: Friday the 13th, The Texas Chain Saw Massacre, A Nightmare on Elm Street, and Rob Zombie's Halloween II remake.

== Action figures ==
Series 1 (Fall 2007)

- Jason Voorhees (Friday the 13th: The Final Chapter) with machete, hacksaw, axe, cleaver, alternate hand, tombstone and alternate wound head.
- Freddy Krueger (A Nightmare on Elm Street 3: Dream Warriors) with Freddy skeleton, alternate head and alternate hand
- Leatherface (The Texas Chain Saw Massacre) with chainsaw, mallet, alternate old lady mask head and alternate old lady apron
- Chop Top (The Texas Chainsaw Massacre 2) with Nubbins corpse, switchblade, hanger, alternate hippie head, alternate lighter hand and radio

Series 2 (Spring 2008)

- Jason Voorhees (Friday The 13th: Jason Lives) with machete, spear, severed head, heart, and tombstone.
- Freddy Krueger (Nightmare on Elm Street) with alternate head, hands, and chestplate.
- Nancy Thompson (A Nightmare on Elm Street) sleeping in bathtub with Freddy's gloved hand emerging from the water.
- Leatherface (Texas Chainsaw Massacre 2) with film-specific mask, cleaver, electric knife, skin from a victim's face, extra pieces of skin, and chainsaw.

Series 3 (Fall 2008)

- Jason Voorhees (Jason Goes to Hell: The Final Friday) with machete, dagger, and miniature Jason demon.
- Freddy Krueger (The Dream Child) with alternate hand, deformed Freddy baby, and film-accurate chef's hat.
- Leatherface (Texas Chainsaw Massacre 2003 Remake) with chainsaw, mallet, and maskless alternate head.
- The Hitchhiker (Texas Chainsaw Massacre) with bindle, camera, pocket knife, and razor.

Series 4 (Summer 2009)

- Jason Voorhees (Friday the 13th Part III) with signature machete, alternate head with ax to fit in the gaping wound, and severed arm.
- Freddy Krueger (The Dream Master) with surgeon's outfit as seen in the film, pizza topped with "the faces of the damned", bone saw, and an alternate head with surgical mask.
- Debbie "The Roach Girl" (The Dream Master) with set of severed arms and roach hotel.

== Screen grabs ==
Series 1

- Friday the 13th (Crystal Lake ending scene)
- The Texas Chainsaw Massacre (Kirk's Death)
- A Nightmare on Elm Street 3: Dream Warriors ("Freddy as a worm" scene)

Series 2

- Friday the 13th Jason Lives (Tommy Jarvis & Jason underwater battle)
- The Texas Chainsaw Massacre 2003 remake (Morgan's death). Also in "MonoChrome Variant"
- A Nightmare on Elm Street (Freddy attempting to come through wall while Nancy is sleeping) Also "Nighttime Variant" (black and white)

== Plush dolls ==
Series 1

- Jason Voorhees (Friday the 13th Part 3) with machete
- Leatherface (Texas Chainsaw Massacre) with chainsaw
- Freddy Krueger (Nightmare on Elm Street) with removable hat

Series 2

- Jason Voorhees (Friday the 13th Part 2) wearing potato sack with a single eyehole. Comes with pickaxe.
- Leatherface (Texas Chainsaw Massacre 2).
- Freddy Krueger (Dream Warriors) dressed in a tuxedo.

== Exclusives ==
Jason Voorhees (Jason Lives, Plush) 10 inch tall with removable hockey mask, severed head, machete, ax, spear, cloth outfit, and fourteen points of articulation.

Jason Voorhees (Hockey Jersey Edition) with machete and hockey jersey.

Jason Voorhees (The New Blood, Plush) 12 inch figure with full articulation and removable fabric jacket and removable hockey mask. This was the first 12" scale release.

== Stylized 9-inch plush ==
Leatherface (Texas Chainsaw Massacre) with chainsaw, bucket of gore, bloody mallet, "bone" handle knife, and removable apron. Featured 13 points of articulation and cloth outfit.

== Friday the 13th (2009) ==
Jason Voorhees (Friday the 13th 2009) 7" articulated figure with weapons used in the film.

== 3.75-inch figures ==
- Jason Voorhees with machete, removable mask and display stand.
- Leatherface with chainsaw, mallet and display stand.
- Freddy Krueger with removable hat and garbage can lid and display stand.

== Tiny Terrors ==
- Leatherface
- Jason Voorhees
- Freddy Krueger

Each of these figures were 2 inch "mini" versions.

== 12-inch figure(s) ==
Freddy Krueger - 12 inch scale figure released to commemorate the twenty-fifth anniversary of A Nightmare on Elm Street. Featured approximately a dozen points of articulation and the faces of his victims' souls in chest. Came with cloth sweater, a miniature of the marionette as seen in the third film, and a removable hat.

== Halloween 2 (2009) ==
- Michael Myers 7 inch articulated figure based on the 2009 version of Halloween II by Rob Zombie. Dressed in film-specific jumpsuit with bloody knife.
