= Brandon Crane =

American actor (born 1976)

Brandon Crane (born February 26, 1976) is an American actor. He is perhaps best known for his role as the young Ben Hanscom in the television miniseries Stephen King's It.

== Life ==
Crane was born in Oceanside, California. He began his career in television adverts at the age of four. He began working in television in 1983 with It's an Adventure, Charlie Brown. After finishing secondary school, Crane started taking singing lessons and has pursued a career in musical theatre ever since.

Crane played the young Ben Hanscom in It, a television miniseries based on Stephen King's 1986 novel of the same title. Crane resonated with his role, as he was himself bullied at school for his weight. He later made a cameo appearance in It Chapter Two (2019) as a board member of the adult Ben Hanscom's (Jay Ryan) company.

In 2005, Crane married his longtime girlfriend, Ami Davis. They have a daughter.

== Partial filmography ==
=== Film ===
- 1983: It's an Adventure, Charlie Brown — Camp Kids (voice, uncredited)
- 1988: A Place at the Table
- 1990: Stephen King's It — young Ben Hanscom
- 1991: The Moms' Team
- 2019: It Chapter Two — Hanscom Architecture board member
- 2021: Pennywise: The Story of 'It' — Himself

=== Television ===
- 1985: Otherworld (2 episodes) — Smith Sterling
- 1987: Magnum (1 episode)
- 1989: Full House (1 episode) — Sheldon
- 1989–1991: The Wonder Years (18 episodes) — Doug Porter
- 1990: Generations (1 episode)
- 1991: Step by Step (1 episode)
