= Steven Hilton =

Steve, Stephen or Steven Hilton may refer to:

- Steven M. Hilton (born 1950), American philanthropist and foundation CEO
- Steven J. Hilton (born 1961), American business executive and philanthropist
- Steve Hilton (born 1969), British-born American Fox News political commentator
- Stephen Hilton (born 1974), English composer, record producer, YouTuber and influencer
