= Steven J. Hilton =

American business executive and philanthropist

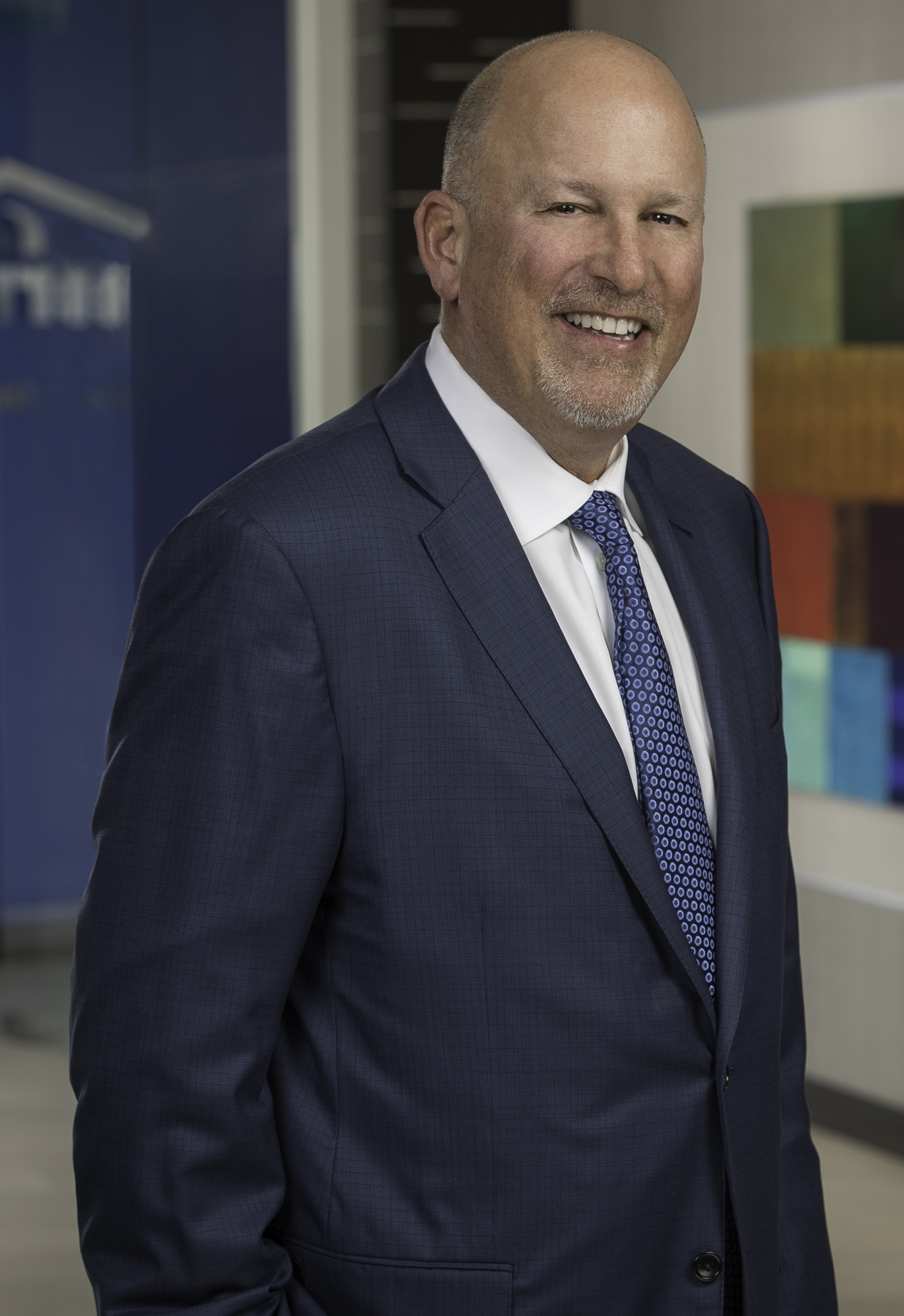
- Hilton in 2019
- Born: Steven Joseph Hilton; 1961 (age 64–65); Los Angeles, California
- Education: University of Arizona
- Occupations: Businessman; Philanthropist
- Years active: 1985–present
- Spouse: Suzanne Dube (m. 2003)
- Children: 4

Steven Joseph Hilton (born 1961) is an American business executive and philanthropist. He is the co-founder, executive chairman, and former CEO of Meritage Homes Corporation.

== Early life and education ==
Hilton was born in Los Angeles, California in 1961. His father, Samuel Hilton, was a Holocaust survivor from Warsaw, Poland, who was captured with Hilton's grandfather by German SS soldiers in 1943, and held in five concentration camps in Poland, Germany, and Czechoslovakia, before being liberated by Soviet forces at Theresienstadt outside of Prague. The sole survivor of his immediate family, Samuel Hilton recuperated in an orphanage in Windermere, England, before immigrating to the United States, settling in Los Angeles.

Hilton was raised in the Los Angeles area before moving with his family to Scottsdale, Arizona at the age of 12. He attended Chaparral High School in Scottsdale and, in 1983, graduated from the University of Arizona with a Bachelor of Arts in accounting and finance. In 2022, he sold his Silverleaf home in Scottsdale, Arizona.

== Career ==
=== Monterey Homes and Meritage Homes ===
In 1985, at the age of 24, Hilton and William W. Cleverly co-founded Monterey Homes, a single-family homebuilder based in Scottsdale, Arizona. In 1996, Monterey completed a reverse merger with Homeplex Mortgage Investments, becoming a publicly traded company listed on the New York Stock Exchange. In 1997, the company was renamed Meritage Homes Corporation.

From 1997 to May 2006, Hilton served as co-chairman and co-chief executive officer of Meritage Homes; in May 2006, he was named sole chairman and chief executive officer. Between 1997 and 2005, Meritage acquired eight homebuilding companies across the United States. The company grew from producing fewer than 300 homes a year in 1996 to over 10,500 homes in 2005, with revenue of $3.5B. In 2011, Hilton led the rollout of Meritage's "Green Program", an energy-efficient homebuilding initiative that began in the Phoenix and was later extended across the company's seven-state footprint. During his tenure, Meritage became a multi-year recipient of the United States Department of Energy's Energy Star Partner of the Year. In 2012, Builder named Hilton CEO of the Year.

Hilton retired as chief executive officer of Meritage Homes effective January 1, 2021, and was succeeded by Phillippe Lord. At the time of his retirement, the company had a market capitalization of approximately US$3.5 billion and had delivered more than 130,000 homes during his tenure. He continues to serve as executive chairman of the company's board of directors. Hilton now serves as Executive Chairman of the Board of Directors of Meritage.

=== Other roles ===
Hilton served as a director of Western Alliance Bancorporation from 2004 to 2022. He has held a minority ownership stake in the Phoenix Suns of the National Basketball Association since 2004. In 2006, he was named an Entrepreneurial Fellow by the Eller College of Management at the University of Arizona.

== Philanthropy ==
Hilton served as a director of the Jewish Federation of Greater Phoenix from 1993 to 2003 and on the board of the King David Community Day School from 1995 to 2003. Since 1995, he has been a Foundation Trustee and board member of the Boys & Girls Clubs of Greater Scottsdale. He is chairman of the board of the Banner Health Foundation, the philanthropic arm of Banner Health, serving an initial two-year term from 2021 to 2023, and is a board member of the TGen Foundation and the National Pancreatic Cancer Advisory Council.

The Steven J. Hilton Family Foundation, a private grantmaking foundation based in Paradise Valley, Arizona, funds initiatives primarily in Arizona and Utah, with Hilton serving as its president. He led efforts to develop the Ina Levine Jewish Community Campus, which opened in 2002. He also contributed to and led the development of the King David Community Day School (now Pardes Jewish Day School), which opened in 2006.

== Personal life ==
Hilton married Suzanne Dube in 2003. He has four children: Shari, Eva, Sophie, and Harrison.
