= Mezco Toyz =

American toy company

- Formerly: Aztech Toyz
- Industry: Entertainment
- Founded: 2000; 26 years ago
- Founder: Michael Markowitz
- Headquarters: Long Island City, NY, U.S.
- Products: Action figures, plushies
- Brands: Mez-Itz
- Website: mezcotoyz.com

Mezco Toyz is an American company headquartered in Long Island City that makes action figures and other collectibles based on original and licensed properties. One of the popular products is the cult hit toy line Living Dead Dolls.

The more popular line is its One:12 line, which has licenses to popular brands such as Marvel, DC, and Godzilla. Other popular licensed properties include Family Guy, South Park and Hellboy. Outside of action figures and doll releases, Mezco is also known for their original block-style figures line Mez-Itz.

== History ==
Mezco Toyz was created by Michael Markowitz (Mez), the President of Mezco, who maintains himself as the overseer of all aspects of design and development. Working with artists and other professionals in the toy industry, Markowitz conceives and directs each line from start to finish.

Mezco Toyz was established in 2000 from the ashes of the short-lived toy production company Aztech Toyz, which obtained recognition for its stylized line of Silent Screamers action figures based on classic black and white silent pictures from the beginning of cinema. The Silent Screamers line was renewed as one of the original releases from Mezco.

In 2022, Mezco announced the Wednesday Living Dead doll. This was released shortly after the Netflix series started streaming. Their Wednesday doll also includes Thing. Along with many other pop culture toys, Mezco announced in August 2023 the released of their Wednesday figure. The figurine is in a dancing pose and modeled after Jenna Ortega's portrayal of Wednesday Addams in the Netflix series, Wednesday.

As of March 1, 2023, the company offered products from over 60 brands. In May, Mezco released their new Superman figure. The new Superman is in a Recovery Suit Edition which is outfitted in all-black and a part of The One:12 collection. In June, Mezco Toyz One:12, announced the release of new action figures, Storm Shadow, Snake Eyes, Destro, Roadblock, and Firefly.

On June 28, 2023, Mezco released an Indiana Jones figurine complete with a gun, multiple whips, torch with blow darts, a spiderweb, a bag of sand, a gun, and a pedestal with the fertility idol from Raiders of the Lost Ark. Indiana also comes with four interchangeable heads, five sets of hands, and a base to stand on. In August 2023 Mezco Toyz received the licensing to do a Raiders of the Lost Ark figure. The figure was of Major Toht, the German Nazi spy. The figurine is portrayed by actor, Ronald Lacey in his movie outfit. The black trench coat, striped suit, fedora, and black from glasses. The figurine also comes with multiple face changes, including the iconic face from the end of the movie where his face is melting. Also included are nine interchangeable hands, a pistol, the Staff of Ra's headpiece, and four pairs of glasses, as well as a light up Ark of the Covenant and an unholy ghost. The figurine is on pre-order and will be shipped in August 2024.

In October 2023, Mezco released a new G.I. Joe action figure with the field commander Duke. This action figure is part of the One:12 Collective by Mezco. The action figure has a grenade launcher, machine gun, hand gun, six hand grenades, a knife, and multiple weapon FX. It also features three interchangeable faces and thirteen interchangeable hands.

In November 2023, Mezco announced The Golden Age Joker will be part of the One: 12 Collective. The Golden Age Joker has three interchangeable heads, three interchangeable hairs, and ten interchangeable hands. The figure will be released in August 2024.

== Products ==
=== Original creations ===
- Creepy Cuddlers: Zombies
- Living Dead Dolls
  - LDD presents
  - Wednesday Living Dead
  - Michael Myers from Halloween II
- Rumble Society
- Mez-its
- Rumble-Mugz
- Gomez
- 5 points
- Mezco Designer Series
- Mezco's Monsters

=== Licensed products ===
- Cinema Of Fear
- ThunderCats
- Earthworm Jim
- Mars Attacks
- Universal Monsters
- Child's Play
- South Park
- Domo
- LittleBigPlanet
- Family Guy
- Scott Pilgrim
- Kaiju Collective

=== Mezco One:12 Collective ===
- Marvel Comics
  - Wolverine
  - Captain America
  - Doctor Strange
  - The Punisher
  - Spider-Man
  - Spider-Man (Miles Morales)
  - Iron Man
  - Red Skull
  - Deadpool
  - Old Man Logan
  - Daredevil
  - Cyclops
  - Blade
  - Ghost Rider
  - Black Bolt and Lockjaw
  - Magneto
  - Moon Knight
  - Iron Fist
  - Gambit
  - Thanos
  - Bishop
- Marvel Cinematic Universe
  - Thor: Ragnarok
  - Spider-Man: Homecoming
  - Daredevil
  - Black Panther
  - The Punisher
  - Captain Marvel
- DC Comics
  - Batman
  - Shazam
  - Darkseid
  - Green Arrow
  - Arsenal
  - Black Adam
  - The Joker
  - The Golden Joker
  - Deathstroke
  - The Flash
  - Reverse Flash
  - Green Lantern (John Stewart)
  - Commissioner Gordon
  - Catwoman
  - Green Lantern (Hal Jordan)
  - Aquaman
  - Harley Quinn
  - Black Mask
  - Wonder Woman
  - KGBeast
  - John Constantine
  - Doctor Fate
  - Nightwing
  - Red Hood
- DC Extended Universe
  - Batman v Superman: Dawn of Justice
  - Suicide Squad
  - Wonder Woman
  - Justice League
- Halloween
- Star Trek
  - James T. Kirk
  - Spock
  - Hikaru Sulu
  - Leonard McCoy
- Judge Dredd
- Space Ghost
- Universal Monsters
  - Frankenstein
- A Clockwork Orange
- Ghostbusters
  - Ray Stantz
  - Egon Spengler
  - Peter Venkman
  - Winston Zeddmore
- Evil Dead II
- Diabolik
- Popeye
- John Wick 2
- The Warriors
- Batman (1989 film)
- Conan the Barbarian
- Planet of the Apes
- DC Universe
  - Superman
- The Dark Knight
- The Dark Knight Rises
- Rumble Society
  - Gomez
  - Atticus Doom
  - Death Adder
  - Cuzin Eddie
  - PSCC (pink skulls chaos club)
  - Hoodz
  - Black Skulls Death Brigade
  - Black Skulls Death Brokers
  - Captain Nemo
  - Krig-13
  - Hawk P-40
  - Doc Nocturnal
  - White Skull: Agent
  - Baron Bends
  - Gold Skull Ninja
  - Mossquatch
- Lord of Tears: Owl Man
- Conan
  - Conan the Barbarian
  - Conan the Conqueror
- Indiana Jones: Raiders of the Lost Ark
  - Indiana Jones
  - Major Toht
  - Ark of the Covenant
- G.I. Joe
  - G.I. Joe: Duke
  - G.I. Joe: Firefly
  - G.I. Joe: Storm Shadow
  - G.I. Joe: Snake Eyes
  - G.I. Joe: Roadblock
  - G.I. Joe: Destro

=== MDS Mega Scale Series ===
- Pizza Face Chucky

== Past products ==
- 20,000 Leagues Under the Sea
- Alien
- Animal House
- Army of Darkness
- Austin Powers
- The Blues Brothers
- Breaking Bad
- Cryptozoology
- Dark Carnival
- Defenders of the Dragon
- Dick Tracy
- Edward Scissorhands
- Gangsters Inc.
- The Goon
- Hellboy (the movie)
- Hellboy Comic
- Hellboy II: The Golden Army
- Heroes
- Hoodz
- Jack the Ripper
- Kong
- Miami Vice
- Monsters
- NFL: Extreme Athletes
- Notorious B.I.G.
- The Osbournes
- Pirates
- Popeye
- Predator
- Public Enemy
- Reservoir Dogs
- RoboCop
- Scarface
- Scary Tales
- Silent Screamers
- TikiMon
- Underworld
- The Warriors

== See also ==
- Funko
- McFarlane Toys
