= Living Dead Dolls =

Line of horror dolls

- Type: Horror dolls
- Inventor: Ed Long and Damien Glonek
- Inception: 1998
- Manufacturer: Mezco Toyz
- Available: Yes
- Website: https://www.livingdeaddolls.com/

Living Dead Dolls is a line of horror dolls first produced as handmades in 1998 in the United States by Ed Long and Damien Glonek, and commercially manufactured by Mezco Toyz since 2000.

== Concept ==
Living Dead Dolls are ten inches tall, made of plastic, with fabric clothing, and come packed in coffin-shaped boxes with death certificates. Each doll has a different cause of death, which is usually described in doggerel verse on the certificate. While the dolls are occasionally inspired by real people such as Lizzie Borden, they are described explicitly as dolls, not representations of actual dead children, and are aimed at an adult audience aged upwards of 15 years.

== Origins ==
The first Living Dead Dolls appeared for sale in the USA in 1998. They were originally craft dolls individually customised by either Ed Long or Damien Glonek and described as "handmades." These original handmade dolls were sold exclusively through Glonek's mail order company Unearthly Possessions, as well as at horror conventions along the East Coast. At one of these conventions, Mike "Mez" Markowitz, the founder of Mezco Toyz noticed the dolls, and subsequently contacted Long and Glonek about manufacturing and distributing the dolls commercially.

At the time of their introduction in 1998, the Living Dead Dolls tapped into the business trend for "witty repackaging of Gothic themes for a teen/twenty-something audience" that emerged after the success of Buffy the Vampire Slayer, which had premiered the previous year. One commentator noted in 2006 that the Living Dead Dolls were unusual among Gothic themed products in that they fell outside the theme of clothing and music that typically defined merchandise aimed towards this market. In addition, the dolls were distinct in that they were generally not obviously connected to pre-existing popular culture such as Buffy the Vampire Slayer, Star Wars or The Lord of the Rings, although were often sold alongside merchandise for these franchises.

== Production history ==
The first commercial series of Living Dead Dolls, Series 1, was released early in the United States in 2000, with a production run of 40,000 sets; and a second edition in Japan. Apart from the boy doll, Damien, the dolls were all based on original handmade designs, such as Eggzorcist, a doll wearing a bunny suit had originally been made for Long's former girlfriend. From 2001, after the dolls went into production, it was possible to request custom handmades directly from the creators. These custom handmades originally cost $666 each, later increased to $800. In 2004, Long & Glonek announced on the Mezco message boards that they would no longer accept commissions or make handmades to order, but would instead occasionally offer handmade dolls on eBay to the highest bidder.

Since their commercial launch by Mezco in 2000, variations have been produced such as miniature dolls, ragdolls and baby dolls, large 18-inch tall porcelain dolls and 13-inch tall fashion dolls called 'Fashion Victims.' A separate line called "Living Dead Dolls Presents" offers dolls based on contemporary and classic movie characters such as Annabelle and the Creature of the Black Lagoon. In addition to dolls, the brand has produced a wide range of spin-off merchandise including stationery sets, pencil sharpeners, and party lights.

Since 2001, a wide range of exclusive special edition dolls have been manufactured too. One of the first of these sets was a 2001 bride and groom set called Died and Doom made as a Tower Records exclusive, while others, such as the Blue Eggzorcist (2003), were only available from specific conventions. Some dolls were only released in specific countries such as the 2003 UK exclusive Jack The Ripper, and others, like Abigail Crane & Mr. Graves, were exclusive only to members of Mezco's club.

By 2017, the thirty-fourth series of the dolls had been produced.

In 2022 it was announced that Mezco Toyz would be releasing a Wednesday Living Dead Doll based on the popular Netflix series, Wednesday.

== Critical response ==
In 2002, the Greek government banned the dolls, releasing a statement which described them as a "serious threat to the smooth formation and development of the child's personality and mental health." Two of the dolls singled out were Inferno, a bat-winged doll with fiery eyes, and Sybil, wearing a collar and chains. In response, the Irish government also looked into banning the dolls, with the Minister of State for Children, Brian Lenihan describing it as a question of "public morality." The dolls were also "nearly banned" in Singapore.

== Products ==
There have been over 34 series of Living Dead Dolls.

=== Current Living Dead Dolls series ===
- The Return of the Living Dead Dolls: Damien
- The Return of the Living Dead Dolls: Eggzorcist
- The Return of The Living Dead Dolls: Sadie
- Resurrection Frozen Charlotte Variant
- Resurrection Talking Chloe Variant
- Resurrection Talking Chloe
- Resurrection Maggot Variant
- Resurrection Maggot
- Vesper
- 20th Anniversary Series - Mystery Collection
- 20th anniversary series
- Ride of Valentine Pencil Sharpener
- Blindbox figures: Resurrection Series 1
