= Jeffrey Boam =

American screenwriter and film producer (1946–2000)

- Born: Jeffrey David Boam; November 30, 1946; Rochester, New York, United States
- Died: January 26, 2000 (aged 53); Los Angeles, California, United States
- Education: Sacramento State College; University of California, Los Angeles
- Occupations: Screenwriter; producer
- Notable work: Indiana Jones and the Last Crusade Lethal Weapon 2 The Dead Zone

Jeffrey David Boam (November 30, 1946 – January 26, 2000) was an American screenwriter and film producer. He is known for writing the screenplays for The Dead Zone, Indiana Jones and the Last Crusade, Innerspace, The Lost Boys, and Lethal Weapon 2 and 3. Boam's films had a cumulative gross of over US$1 billion. He was educated at Sacramento State College and UCLA. Boam died of heart failure on January 26, 2000, at age 53.

== Early life and education ==
Boam was born in Rochester, New York. He grew up in Fair Lawn, New Jersey, and his family moved to Sacramento, California, when he was 11. His father was an aeronautical engineer. He developed a taste for action films by watching World War II film on television as a child. As a teenager, he saw the film Tom Jones, which he said "made the greatest impression" on him, ultimately making him "want to be in movies." He attended Sacramento State College, earning a B.A. in art in 1969. While interested in the film industry, he initially thought that his art training would lead him to a career in art direction or production design. Not wanting to "serve in the ranks", he decided that directing would be most satisfying. He entered graduate school at UCLA film school, hoping to start a career in directing. He couldn't afford to pay for his own film, processing, and equipment. But he did own a typewriter, so he took a writing course and prepared to study screenwriting instead of directing. At UCLA, he took classes under Richard Walter. Boam took an advanced screenwriting class taught by William Froug. He decided to "target" Froug, hoping to impress the writing teacher into accepting him to be a directed studies student. Boam was impressed by Froug's success, and wanted one-on-one help. He said, "I just knew that Bill could help me, but I needed more than the slightly impersonal, two-hour-a-week instruction of the class." He gave Froug two screenplays for review, but the writing teacher wasn't impressed with either of them. This didn't deter Boam, who persisted. Boam told Froug, "Well, I'll just have to write better." Froug relented and started mentoring him, and said that over the semesters Boam got "better and better, but ... was still struggling." The two collaborated on a screenplay called Johnny, about the bank robber John Dillinger. On the day the screenplay was finished, they learned that director John Milius was starting production on Dillinger, destroying their hopes of selling their script as a feature. However, their script was bought under a one-year option for $10,000 by producer Edward Lewis, who sold it to NBC as a possible television movie. In the end, the screenplay was never produced.

Boam graduated from UCLA in 1973, with a Master of Fine Arts degree. He got a job as a film booker for Paramount Pictures, where he kept track of film prints and made sure the movies were distributed to the correct theaters. All the while, he was writing scripts, trying to land a screenwriting job. Of the work at Paramount, Boam said, "I was ... in the worst kind of Siberia in Hollywood." He switched from Paramount to the film distribution office at 20th Century Fox, where he earned $200 a week. In 1976, Froug helped him get an agent, and some of his scripts were shopped around Hollywood. He got a flurry of meetings with film studio executives and producers, eventually meeting producer Tony Bill. Bill offered to pay Boam the same $200 per week he was making at Fox, but instead write screenplays. Bill's stipulation was that he get a free option on whatever was written. Before Boam entered into that arrangement, one of his scripts was optioned by director-producer Ulu Grosbard. This became Boam's first Hollywood writing job.

== Career ==
=== Straight Time ===
Ulu Grosbard took on the directing job of the film Straight Time, after its original director, actor Dustin Hoffman, dropped out to focus on starring in the lead role. The film, based on the novel No Beast So Fierce by Edward Bunker, is about a thief who is released from prison and tries to live a straight life. Boam was asked to rewrite the script, and he quit his job at Fox to work with Grosbard. He received writing credit for the film, along with Bunker and Alvin Sargent.

=== The Dead Zone ===
As a film adaptation of Stephen King's 1979 novel The Dead Zone was being developed by Lorimar, producer Carol Baum gave the book to Boam, and asked him to write a screenplay. "I saw it had great possibilities and agreed to do it," Boam said. Boam developed a script with director Stanley Donen, who left the project before the film reached production at Lorimar. The company eventually closed its film division after a series of box office failures, and soon after, producer Dino de Laurentiis bought the rights to the novel. He initially disliked Boam's screenplay and asked King to adapt his own novel. De Laurentiis reportedly then rejected King's script as "involved and convoluted"; however, David Cronenberg, who ultimately directed the film, said that he was the one who decided not to use the script, finding it "needlessly brutal". De Laurentiis rejected a second script by Andrei Konchalovsky, eventually returning to Boam. The film was finally on track to be made when de Laurentiis hired a producer, Debra Hill, to work with Cronenberg and Boam.

Boam abandoned King's parallel story structure for The Dead Zone's screenplay, turning the plot into separate episodes. Boam told writer Tim Lucas in 1983, "King's book is longer than it needed to be. The novel sprawls and it's episodic. What I did was use that episodic quality, because I saw The Dead Zone as a triptych." His script was revised and condensed four times by Cronenberg, who eliminated large portions of the novel's story, including plot points about Johnny Smith having a brain tumor. Cronenberg, Boam, and Hill had script meetings to revise the screenplay page by page. Boam's "triptych" in the screenplay surrounds three acts: the introduction of Johnny Smith before his car accident and after he awakes from a coma, a story about Smith assisting a sheriff to track down the Castle Rock Killer, and finally Johnny deciding to confront the politician Stillson. Boam said that he enjoyed writing character development for Smith, having him struggle with the responsibility of his psychic abilities, and ultimately give up his life for the greater good. "It was this theme that made me like the book, and I particularly enjoyed discovering it in what was essentially a genre piece, a work of exploitation," he said. In Boam's first draft of the screenplay, Johnny does not die at the end, but rather has a vision about the Castle Rock Killer, who is still alive and escaped from prison. Cronenberg insisted that this "trick ending" be revised. Boam submitted the final draft of the screenplay on November 8, 1982.

King is reported to have told Cronenberg that changes the director and Boam made to the story "improved and intensified the power of the narrative." In an interview with film critic Christopher Hicks, Boam said that the success of the film is generally credited to Cronenberg, and that King would not give Boam credit for writing a good script. He said, "It's hard for him to admit that he's not the one who could crack that book. But I think that movie holds together as a real movie. It's not just some kind of weird concoction of Stephen King's."

=== Writing for Warner Bros. ===
Pleased with Boam's early work on Straight Time and a script called The Good Guys, Warner Bros. signed him to an exclusive contract as a staff writer. He was frequently asked to rewrite and polish scripts for "high concept" films with commercial potential. His contract with Warner Bros. was for $3 million, over three years, and had a great deal of flexibility built into it. He was able to pick and choose the projects he wanted to work on, and was able to decide on the rewrite he was offered. His contract also allowed for the possibility of producing and directing projects. His first producing project was for a science-fiction comedy called Space Case, about a Los Angeles detective who specializes in locating people abducted by aliens. The screenplay for Space Case was developed by Boam and screenwriter Richard Outten, and written by Outten. Despite skepticism by Warner Bros. executives, Boam encouraged Outten to finish the screenplay. However, they were beaten to production by another film with a similar story, Men in Black, and Space Case was never made.

=== Innerspace ===
When producer Peter Guber was developing Innerspace, a film about an explorer who is miniaturized and sent into another man's body, he hired a young writer named Chip Proser to write a script for the story. Director Joe Dante thought the story was too much like Fantastic Voyage, and did not want to direct it. Guber later took the story to Warner Bros. with executive Bruce Berman. Director John Carpenter was briefly attached to the project. Warner Bros. asked Boam to rewrite the script, but he initially refused. "I balked at it," Boam said, "I didn't even think the premise had much merit." Carpenter convinced Boam that there was a good story to tell, and Boam wrote a draft. He said, "I took the premise and basically invented everything else." Eventually Carpenter left the project to direct Big Trouble in Little China, and Dante joined as director. Dante said that Boam's screenplay was "a wonderful script ... completely the opposite of the first. It was ... imaginative, funny, clever ..." Dante was pleased that the new script was not a "rip off" of Fantastic Voyage. He said that although both Boam and Proser share writing credit for the film, it was Boam "who really wrote the picture." The script was given to Steven Spielberg, who liked it so much, he agreed to produce the film.

=== The Lost Boys ===
The original screenplay for The Lost Boys, written by James Jeremias and Janice Fischer, was a more innocent vision involving children in a Peter Pan-like plot. Its producer Richard Donner wanted to increase the appeal to teenagers. Boam was requested by director Joel Schumacher to rewrite the screenplay, hoping to "sex up the plot and up the ante on laughs and the violent disposal of vamps".

=== Funny Farm ===
In 1986, actor Chevy Chase bought the rights to Jay Cronley's novel Funny Farm. The story is a comedy about a couple from New York City that move to a small New England town, and the quirky troubles and encounters they have. Chase and his business partner Bruce Bodner hired Boam to adapt the book for film. The three spent several weeks developing the script. The screenplay was originally episodic, mirroring the structure of the novel. When George Roy Hill was hired as director, he insisted a new script be written, with a more definitive plot. Boam, Chase, and Bodner then spent the remainder of the year rewriting the screenplay.

=== Lethal Weapon films ===
Lethal Weapon was written by Shane Black, and was released in the spring of 1987. A buddy-cop story, it starred Mel Gibson as Martin Riggs, a suicidal detective who uses crazed antics to deal with criminals. He is paired with Roger Murtaugh (played by Danny Glover), a veteran detective with a traditional home life. Boam was hired to make some changes on the script, after the producers found parts of it too grim. Though he contributed some scenes, he is uncredited on the screenplay. For the sequel, Lethal Weapon 2, Black submitted a script, but it was rejected by the film's producers as "too dark and violent". In Black's original script, the Martin Riggs character dies. Boam was hired again, this time to completely rewrite the sequel. He gained widespread notice for writing the screenplays for Lethal Weapon 2 and later for Lethal Weapon 3. Boam was credited somewhat unusually for Lethal Weapon 3; He is credited twice in the 'screenplay by' credits. This is because he did one draft by himself (granting him the first credit) and a second draft collaborating with Robert Mark Kamen (granting him the second credit). In this rare scenario, Boam was hired to rewrite his own script with a second writer. After receiving the unusual writing credits, the advertising department assumed it was a misprint and produced posters with the credits "Story by Jeffrey Boam, Screenplay by Jeffrey Boam and Robert Mark Kamen". After a few of the posters had been sent out, the WGA contacted the department, telling them that the initial credits were the correct ones, and ordering the posters to be recalled and destroyed. A few still remain in circulation, however.

=== Indiana Jones and the Last Crusade ===
Indiana Jones and the Last Crusade, the third film in the popular Indiana Jones series, went through a flimsy scripting process before Boam was hired to write a draft. As early as 1984, George Lucas was playing with the concept of having Jones encounter the fabled Holy Grail, the cup said to have been used by Jesus Christ during the Last Supper. Director Steven Spielberg rejected Lucas's script outlines, disliking the Grail idea. Screenwriter Diane Thomas wrote a haunted house story for Indiana Jones, but Spielberg said that after producing Poltergeist, he did not want to do a similar film. Lucas hired Chris Columbus to write a draft for the film, and he submitted Indiana Jones and the Lost City of Sun Wu Kung, a story with evil spirits, ghosts, and demons. Again, Spielberg rejected the story as not believable enough. Lucas convinced him to go back to the Holy Grail idea, and Menno Meyjes was hired to develop another screenplay. The new script focused on the Arthurian legend aspect of the Holy Grail. Although the script was not to the liking of Lucas and Spielberg, it had elements that eventually became part of the finished film: the Holy Grail, and the introduction of Indiana Jones's father, Henry Jones Sr.

Spielberg suggested that Boam write the next draft, and Lucas agreed to it. Boam felt some nervousness going into the process. He joked that "the battlefield was littered with writers before I came on to the scene. There were four or five before me. Each writer had their script next to them covered with blood." Boam said that when Spielberg called to offer him the job, Spielberg said "something like, 'You wanna get real rich?' and I said, 'Yeah, why?' and he said, 'I think you should do the next Indiana Jones movie.'" Boam is reported to have replied to Spielberg's offer by saying, "I just don't know why you didn't come to me before." Boam spent two weeks filled with eight-hour days working with Lucas to develop the story. The two blocked out all other commitments to create the story, building it "beat by beat". Lucas already knew many of the set pieces that were to be in the movie. During the two-week story conference, Boam worked to incorporate it all into the new narrative. "Jeff was very collaborative," Lucas said, adding, "He'd try to include both Steven's ideas and my ideas, and tried to get what we wanted done."

Spielberg liked the story outline presented by Lucas and Boam, but wanted a first draft before making a decision to move forward. He was planning on directing the film Rain Man, but an Indiana Jones project would take precedence. Boam signed a contract on April 14, 1987. He wrote his first draft that summer, and turned it in on September 15, with another revision on September 30. It was at that time that Spielberg made a commitment to direct the Indiana Jones film over Rain Man, based on reading one of Boam's unfinished drafts. Spielberg said, "We licked it with Boam". Spielberg brought actor Sean Connery in to portray Henry Jones Sr., and Connery provided substantial input into the character, who Lucas originally conceived as an eccentric professor—"an Obi-Wan Kenobi type." Boam wanted to expand the father character, making him more central to the plot. He said that in Meyjes's original script, "the father was sort of a MacGuffin ... they didn't find the father until the very end. I said to George, 'It doesn't make sense to find the father at the end. Why don't they find him in the middle?'" He wanted the father-son relationship to be the main point, rather than the Grail. With the input of Spielberg and Connery, Boam altered the senior Jones from "a somewhat crotchety old character" to a man with more "vitality". Connery wanted the father to have a prior sexual relationship to the same female archeologist that Indiana Jones sleeps with. Boam incorporated this into the script, with Indiana's reaction to learning that he and his father slept with the same woman defused through humor. Boam said, "He's a bit humbled and surprised that his dad would be able to attract this young attractive woman ... but he isn't appalled by it."

Boam, who was raised Catholic, used many religious themes and metaphors in his script for the film. In preparing the story, he studied grail literature, but ultimately invented new mythology. He made the grail a symbol for faith. He said, "I guess the major given of faith is that it can't be proved otherwise you don't need faith. So that is why I created the idea that the grail can't be removed (from its hiding place). You can find the grail, but you can't really prove that you found it." When Indiana Jones finally discovers the grail hidden among decoys, its knight guardian tells him that he will die if he drinks from the wrong cup. Boam said that this scene is a metaphor for "the one true God vs. false gods". He worried that the film's religious themes would face criticism from the general audience, as well as religious scholars. He was relieved when the criticism did not appear, saying, "Nobody working on this movie was a religious scholar ... I was wondering if the numerous allusions to Christ in Indiana Jones were going to put people off. I was afraid the kids in the audience would think it was not a very hip subject matter."

Indiana Jones and the Last Crusade was a hit film, earning over $474 million worldwide.

=== Television ===
Boam met writer Carlton Cuse through producer Bernard Schwartz. According to Cuse, Boam approached him after his work on the television series Crime Story and asked that the two form a writing partnership. The two had plans to write original films together, but they eventually developed the stories and scripts for Lethal Weapon 2, Lethal Weapon 3, and Indiana Jones and the Last Crusade. They formed a production company, Boam/Cuse Productions, and produced a television pilot based on The Witches of Eastwick. NBC requested the pilot in 1992, and it starred Catherine Mary Stewart and Julia Campbell. They also planned a comedy series called Cat Canyon. With Cuse, Boam co-created and produced the series The Adventures of Brisco County, Jr. featuring Bruce Campbell, which premiered on the Fox Network in 1993. It was the only series Boam wrote that made it on to television.

Boam wrote and directed a 1993 episode of HBO's Tales From the Crypt, entitled "Creep Course", based on the EC comic Haunt of Fear number 23–1. The episode's story involves an archeology professor who enlists the aid of a jock in his class to trick an unsuspecting female student into becoming a human sacrifice to a mummy. In the end, she turns the tables on them, and they become victims of the mummy instead. Boam told EON Magazine in 1996 that he did not enjoy the directing experience, finding the work days too long and labor-intensive.

=== The Phantom and late scripts ===
Paramount hired Boam in 1992 to write a script for The Phantom, based on Lee Falk's comic strip character, with Joe Dante to direct. The box office failure of The Shadow, a similarly themed period adventure, put the film on hold for several years. Boam's original script was intended to be a funny spoof of The Phantom. The studio restarted the film with Simon Wincer as director, who had Boam make changes to the original script, including a decision to keep the screenplay close in style and tone to the source material. Dante said that "nobody seemed to notice it was written to be funny, so it was—disastrously—played straight."

Boam worked on screenplay drafts for a feature-length movie based on the DC Comics World War II hero Sgt. Rock, which was not produced.

In a 1995 interview, Boam expressed an interest to rewrite and polish the Star Wars scripts George Lucas had written for the Star Wars prequel trilogy. Lucas ultimately wrote and directed all of those films himself.

Boam worked with George Lucas again in the fourth Indiana Jones film at some point before his death in 2000; Boam and Lucas came up with placing the title character in a nuke town only for him to survive the atomic blast inside a fridge during the middle of the story. Such a set-piece survived through the screenplay's various iterations that ultimately turned into Indiana Jones and the Kingdom of the Crystal Skull in 2008, written by David Koepp, albeit the scene was placed around the film's first act instead.

== Writing style ==
Boam's action film scripts are character-driven and mixed with humor. He told The New York Times that he had no problem writing a contrived plot in service of character interactions. "Plot tries to engage intellectually, but that's not how an audience responds," he said, adding, "I want emotional reaction, not intellectual engagement. An audience wants to be wound up because it enjoys the pop at the end when it's liberated." Writing in Scr(i)pt magazine, Ray Morton said that Boam's scripts "showed a strong feel for genre and story construction as well as a solid aptitude for creating robust, well-developed characters, and clever, witty dialogue."

He rarely outlined a script, preferring to finish a story in his head, and then write the draft. Boam said, "I don't have any kind of routine, where I do notes or outlines or character sketches. I just try and live with it in my head, until it's ready to be spat out." He wrote every weekday, from 10:00 am to 6:00 pm, without taking breaks.

== Personal life ==
Boam lived in the San Fernando Valley with his wife, Paula, a photographer and daughter of a Paramount Pictures vice president. They had three children, Tessa, Mia, and Dashiell. USA Today described Boam as "low-key", and The New York Times called him "a polite, soft-spoken family man without a trace of the frenzied energy of his films." Film critic Christopher Hicks said that Boam could be unusually candid, but that "Boam is simply Boam—a reclusive writer rather than a celebrity worried about his image. And what you see is what you get, if perhaps a bit outspoken and opinionated." He died on January 26, 2000, due to a heart failure from a rare lung disease.

William Froug wrote, "His agonizingly slow death at a young age touched everyone who ever knew or worked with this most remarkable young man. Jeffrey’s widow told me he was struggling with the vicissitudes of Hollywood and questioning his own talent during his final days."

== Filmography ==
- Straight Time (with Edward Bunker) (1978)
- The Dead Zone (1983)
- Innerspace (with Chip Proser, 1987)
- The Lost Boys (with Janice Fischer and James Jeremias, 1987)
- Funny Farm (1988)
- Indiana Jones and the Last Crusade (1989)
- Lethal Weapon 2 (1989)
- Lethal Weapon 3 (with Robert Mark Kamen, 1992)
- The Witches of Eastwick (with Michael Cristofer and Carlton Cuse, 1992, TV)
- The Adventures of Brisco County, Jr. (also co-creator and executive producer, with Carlton Cuse, 1993, TV)
- Tales from the Crypt, episode No. 61, "Creep Course" (1993) (TV, also director)
- The Phantom (1996, also co-producer)
