= Jack (2004 film) =

2004 American drama TV film directed by Lee Rose

- Based on: Jack by A. M. Homes
- Written by: A. M. Homes
- Directed by: Lee Rose
- Starring: Anton Yelchin; Ron Silver; Stockard Channing; Erich Anderson; Brent Spiner
- Music by: Velton Ray Bunch
- Country of origin: United States
- Original language: English

Production
- Producers: Dan Paulson; Rose Lam
- Cinematography: Jan Kiesser
- Editor: Peter V. White
- Running time: 104 minutes
- Production companies: Daniel L. Paulson Productions; Susan Rose Productions

Original release
- Network: Showtime
- Release: June 20, 2004

Jack is a 2004 American made-for-television drama film written by A. M. Homes and directed by Lee Rose. Adapted from Homes' 1990 novel of the same name, the film is about a boy whose life is torn apart because of his parents' divorce. The film stars Anton Yelchin, Stockard Channing, Ron Silver, Erich Anderson and Brent Spiner.

== Plot ==
Jack is a 15-year-old boy going through puberty. When his parents Anne and Paul divorce, his world starts to fall apart. While on a fishing trip with his father, Jack learns that Paul is in a live-in relationship with a man. The youth is bullied at school when other students find out about this.

Jack's best friend Max also has problems, because his mother is being beaten by his father. Jack has a crush on another friend, Maggie, and learns that her father is also gay. By the end, Jack matures and learns to accept his family and friends, and more importantly, himself.

== Cast ==
- Anton Yelchin as Jack
- Stockard Channing as Anne
- Ron Silver as Paul
- Erich Anderson as Steve Burka
- Andrew Airlie as Michael
- Brent Spiner as Vernon
- Giacomo Baessato as Max
- Britt Irvin as Maggie
- Ryan Drescher as Sammy
- Kevin Blatch as Jim
- Jordan Weller as Eddie Hayes
- Blu Mankuma as Coach
