= Music for Torching =

A. M. Homes novel

- Author: A. M. Homes
- Language: English
- Publication date: 1999

Music for Torching is a 1999 novel by American writer A. M. Homes. It is about a dysfunctional suburban family in the contemporary United States. The book deals with issues including sex, infidelity, social consciousness, and school violence. It is one of Homes' most critically acclaimed books.

== Background ==
Homes published the first chapter of her 1999 novel Music for Torching as a short story in The New Yorker. The title comes from a 1955 jazz album of the same name, recorded by singer Billie Holiday. It features some characters who appeared in short stories of her first collection, The Safety of Objects (1990).

== Plot summary ==
Characters include Elaine and Paul, a married middle-class couple, and their two male children. Paul works in New York City, and Elaine is "staying at home" to rear the children. The couple alternate between proclaiming their happiness and boredom. By the end of the first chapter, they have set fire to their house.

== Reception ==
Gary Krist of The New York Times wrote that this novel by Homes was "far more effectively unsettling [than her previous The End of Alice], mainly because she serves up her feast of deviance in a narrative that is much more difficult to dismiss." He described this novel as "nasty and willfully grotesque."

He wrote further:

"The fact is, I was at times appalled by the book, annoyed by it, angered by it. Its ending struck me as cynical and manipulative. But even so, I found myself rapt from beginning to end, fascinated by Homes's single-minded talent for provocation."

He says of the last chapter:

"But here, again, Homes proves herself such a virtuoso portraitist of modern depravity that any sense of violation is complicated by an overwhelming exhilaration. The scene is so electrifying, in other words, that you can almost forgive Homes the blatantly aggressive impulse behind it."

He concluded with a caveat: "In her last two novels, the desire to outrage is so conspicuous that it risks obscuring her powerful gifts as a novelist."

Jill Adams in The Barcelona Review described this novel as having Homes' "trademark style of wry humor applied to the uncanny dissection of suburbia’s facade." Britain's The Observer found it "immensely disturbing". People magazine called the novel "haunting.",
