= Gary Krist =

Gary Krist may refer to:

- Gary Steven Krist (born 1945), American kidnapper and drug smuggler
- Gary Krist (writer) (born 1957), American writer and journalist
