= Empire of Sin =

Empire of Sin may refer to:

- Empire of Sin (video game), a 2020 video game
- Empire of Sin: A Story of Sex, Jazz, Murder, and the Battle for Modern New Orleans, a 2014 book
- Sins of Empire, a 2017 book
