= Go Fish (film) =

1994 film by Rose Troche

- Film poster
- Directed by: Rose Troche
- Written by: Rose Troche; Guinevere Turner
- Produced by: Rose Troche; Guinevere Turner
- Starring: Guinevere Turner; V. S. Brodie
- Cinematography: Ann T. Rossetti
- Edited by: Rose Troche
- Music by: Scott Aldrich; Brendan Dolan; Jennifer Sharpe
- Distributed by: The Samuel Goldwyn Company
- Release date: June 10, 1994
- Running time: 84 minutes
- Country: United States
- Language: English
- Budget: $15,000–$250,000
- Box office: $2.5 million

Go Fish is a 1994 American Romance comedy drama film written by Guinevere Turner and Rose Troche and directed by Rose Troche. It premiered at the Sundance Film Festival in 1994, and was the first film to be sold to a distributor, Samuel Goldwyn, during that event for $450,000. The film was released during Pride Month in June 1994 and eventually grossed $2.5 million. The film was seen as groundbreaking for celebrating lesbian culture on all levels, and it launched the careers of co-writers Troche and Turner. Go Fish is said to have proved the marketability of lesbian issues for the film industry.

== Plot ==
Max is a young lesbian college student in Chicago who has gone ten months without having sex. She and her roommate and college professor Kia are in a coffee shop when they run into Ely, a hippieish woman with long braided hair, whom Max initially dismisses. Max and Ely end up going to a film together, and afterward return to Ely's place, where, after some flirtatious conversation, they kiss. They are interrupted by a phone call from Ely's partner Kate, with whom Ely has been in a long-distance relationship for more than two years, which puts a bit of a damper on things.

Ely decides to cut her hair into a very short butch style. At a bookstore, she meets Max, who barely recognizes her.

Kia's girlfriend Evy returns to her family's home to find her ex-husband Junior there and be confronted by her mother, who tells her that Junior told her he spotted Evy at a gay bar. Evy's mother throws her out, and Evy flees to Kia's place, where Max invites her to live with them.

Ely and her roommate Daria throw a dinner party and, after a spirited game of I Never, Max and Ely reconnect. After making plans to go out again, they kiss. Over the course of several phone conversations, Ely reveals that she's "sort of broken up" with Kate. They meet for a second date, but they don't make it out of the apartment; Max ends up trimming Ely's fingernails, which turns into foreplay before they have sex. Intercut with the closing credits are shots and short scenes of Max and Ely's burgeoning relationship.

== Themes ==
=== Queer identity and community ===
Go Fish has a theme of lesbian identity and community firmly taking place in the context of 1990s Chicago. This film is categorized as being part of the new queer cinema, a term which B. Ruby Rich described as having an element of rejection of stereotypical or tragic portrayals of members of the LGBTQ+ community. Go Fish celebrates lesbian relationships and community in everyday settings, making an emphasis to show the mundane and how members of this community of are living their lives. The film's black-and-white and low-budget aesthetic furthers this idea of it being a raw and unfiltered portrayal of this community. It takes on almost an episodic structure, shows dialogue between close-knit groups of lesbian friends, and focuses on love and acceptance in a supporting community place. Go Fish actively avoids framing lesbian life through a heterosexual lens, and portrays characters who have real struggles and real aspirations, underlining the authenticity of the film. The group of friends in the film who engage in matchmaking and offer advice to Max throughout the film showcases how the lesbian community acts as her chosen family as well as a social and moral anchor for her.

Developed amidst the AIDS crisis, Go Fish brought attention to marginalized voices, celebrating love and solidarity as a response to societal exclusion. Director Rose Troche described it as an "antidote to despair", highlighting how the film's joyous portrayal of community offered an alternative to the bleak landscape for LGBTQ+ people in cinema at the time. Filmmaker Magazine detailed the behind-the-scenes dynamic as a DIY, community-driven process. Troche and co-writer/actress Guinevere Turner collaborated closely with friends, casting local acquaintances and filming in everyday locations, which allowed the narrative to feel rooted in reality and accessible to a broader audience. This communal production process, as noted by Troche, aligned with the film's themes of solidarity and self-acceptance, as well as the feminist undertones of giving space to lesbian women's voices in film. By focusing on the lives, love, and friendships of lesbian women, Go Fish broke new ground in queer cinema, making it a significant cultural marker in LGBTQ+ representation and visibility.

== Cast ==
- Guinevere Turner as Camille "Max" West
- V. S. Brodie as Ely
- T. Wendy McMillan as Kia
- Anastasia Sharp as Daria
- Migdalia Melendez as Evy
- Scout as Hairdresser
- Dave Troche as Junior

== Production ==
Rose Troche and Guinevere Turner read B. Ruby Rich's article "New Queer Cinema" in Sight and Sound and were inspired to contact Christine Vachon for production support. The script was written collaboratively between Troche and Turner and the film took about three years to finish. Prior to writing the film, the pair had worked on projects for ACT UP Chicago. Actors for the film were friends, people spotted around town, or volunteers pulled from open casting calls.

== Reception ==
On the review aggregator website Rotten Tomatoes, 76% of 70 critics' reviews are positive, with an average rating of 6.4/10. The website's consensus reads: "With sensitive direction from Rose Troche and terrific work from co-writer/star Guinevere Turner, Go Fish plays a winning hand." Variety summarized it as "a fresh, hip comedy about contemporary lifestyles within the lesbian community. Theatrical prospects are excellent for an all-female picture that is sharply observed, visually audacious and full of surprising charms". The Rolling Stone commented that "Troche brings an engagingly light touch to material that ranges from negotiating girl bars to maintaining friendships".

IndieWire ranked it in 5th place on its list of the 15 Greatest Lesbian Movies of All Time.

Rita Kempley of The Washington Post wrote "Go Fish hasn't got an agenda unless it's that girls just gotta have fun". Melissa Pierson of Entertainment Weekly gave the film a "B+", explaining her reasoning by writing that "In matters of both sex and artistic license, this is a rental to make you say, "Vive la difference"".

== Awards and nominations ==
- Berlin International Film Festival Teddy Award winner for Best Feature Film (1994)
- Deauville Film Festival Audience Award winner and Critics Award nomination for Rose Troche (1994)
- GLAAD Media Awards winner for Best Feature (1995)
- Gotham Awards Open Palm Award for Rose Troche (1994)
- Independent Spirit Awards nomination for Best Supporting Female for V. S. Brodie (1995)
- Political Film Society Award for Human Rights nomination (1995)
- Sundance Film Festival Grand Jury Prize nomination (1994)

== See also ==
- List of LGBT-related films directed by women
- List of lesbian filmmakers
