= Quick Change =

1990 film by Bill Murray, Howard Franklin

- Theatrical release poster
- Directed by: Howard Franklin; Bill Murray
- Written by: Howard Franklin
- Based on: Quick Change by Jay Cronley
- Produced by: Robert Greenhut; Bill Murray
- Starring: Bill Murray; Geena Davis; Randy Quaid; Jason Robards
- Cinematography: Michael Chapman
- Edited by: Alan Heim
- Music by: Randy Edelman
- Distributed by: Warner Bros.
- Release date: July 13, 1990
- Running time: 89 minutes
- Country: United States
- Language: English
- Budget: $17 million
- Box office: $15.3 million

Quick Change is a 1990 American crime comedy film directed by Howard Franklin and Bill Murray (in their feature directorial debuts) and written by Franklin. Based on the novel of the same name by Jay Cronley, the film stars Murray, Geena Davis, Randy Quaid, and Jason Robards. Quick Change follows three people on an elaborate bank robbery and their subsequent escape.

Filmed and set in New York City, Quick Change is the second adaptation of Cronley's novel, after the 1985 Franco-Canadian film Hold-Up. It is also the only directorial credit in Murray's career.

Quick Change was theatrically released in the United States on July 13, 1990. Upon release, it was a commercial failure, grossing $15.3 million worldwide against a budget of $17 million, but received positive reviews, with praise for Murray's performance and humor.

== Plot ==
Grimm is a burned out New Yorker who's down on his luck. He longs to escape his miserable life in New York City - and the country - but is lacking the means to do so. Desperate, he dresses up as a clown and robs a bank in midtown Manhattan. He sets up a daring hostage situation tying fake dynamite all over his waist and successfully steals $1 million along with his accomplices: girlfriend Phyllis and best friend Loomis.

The heist itself is smooth and uneventful, but the getaway proves problematic. The relatively simple act of getting to the airport to catch a flight out of the country is complicated by the fact that fate, luck, and all of New York City appear to be conspiring against their escape.

To begin with, the trio is seeking the Brooklyn-Queens Expressway to get to the airport, but the signs were removed during construction work, resulting in the three robbers becoming lost in an unfamiliar neighborhood in Brooklyn. Then, a thug robs the trio of everything they have (except the bank money, which they have taped under their clothes).

After changing into new clothes at Phyllis's apartment, they are confronted and nearly gunned down by the paranoid schizophrenic tenant. At the same time, a fire has broken out across the street and the fire department arrives and pushes their car away from a hydrant only to cause it to roll downhill and then down an embankment.

When the three crooks eventually manage to flag down a cab, the foreign driver does not understand English. This causes an emotional Loomis to jump out of the moving cab to grab another, but he runs into a newsstand, knocking himself unconscious. The driver leaves, thinking he has killed Loomis. An anal-retentive bus driver, a run-in with mobsters, and Phyllis's increasing desperation to tell Grimm the news that she is pregnant with his child add further complications.

All the while, Rotzinger, a world-weary but relentless chief of the New York City Police Department, is doggedly attempting to nab the fleeing trio. A meeting on board an airliner at the airport occurs between the robbers and the chief, who gets the added prize of having a major crime boss dropped in his lap with their assistance. Unfortunately, the chief only realizes who they were after their plane has taken off.

== Cast ==
- Bill Murray as Grimm
- Geena Davis as Phyllis Potter
- Randy Quaid as Loomis
- Jason Robards as Chief Walt Rotzinger
- Philip Bosco as Bus Driver
- Bob Elliott as Bank Guard
- Phil Hartman as Mr. Edison
- Jack Gilpin as Yuppie Hostage
- Tony Shalhoub as Cab Driver
- Victor Argo as Mike Skelton
- Stanley Tucci as Johnny
- Kathryn Grody as Mrs. Edison
- Richard Joseph Paul as Lieutenant Dennis Jameson
- Jamey Sheridan as The Mugger
- Kurtwood Smith as Vince Lombino / Russ Crane
- Paul Herman as Interrogating Policeman

== Production ==
In her 2022 memoir Dying of Politeness, Davis claimed that Murray sexually harassed her during their first meeting for the film by insisting on using an electric massage device on her despite her repeatedly telling him to stop. She said that he also screamed at her for being late during filming.

A number of scenes where the trio are driving around lost, happen upon a modern joust/duel, and even the taxi scenes were filmed in various parts of Queens and Brooklyn. The scene where the woman is screaming at the road crew was filmed in the South Bronx. The scenes that were filmed right after the escape from the bank were filmed on the Brooklyn waterfront that is now totally unrecognizable in the present day as it appeared in the film.

Jonathan Demme was initially chosen to direct the film, but then was no longer available. Ron Howard was then approached. He turned it down after reading the script, saying that there was no character to root for. After unsuccessful attempts to agree on a suitable director, Howard Franklin and Bill Murray opted to direct the picture themselves.

== Reception ==
On Rotten Tomatoes, the film has an approval rating of 84% based on 37 reviews, with an average rating of 6.7/10. The website's critics consensus reads: "Quick Change makes the most of its clever premise with a smartly skewed heist comedy that leaves plenty of room for its talented cast to shine." On Metacritic it has a weighted average score of 56 out of 100 based on 17 critics, indicating "mixed or average reviews". Audiences surveyed by CinemaScore gave the film an average grade of "B" on an A+ to F scale.

Several critics claim it is one of Murray's finest roles: a jaded man who has had too much of the Big Apple. Also praised were the strong performances by the supporting cast, particularly Robards as the police chief Rotzinger, who, while almost as burned out as Murray, is still determined to capture the robbers as a swan song to his long career.

Roger Ebert of the Chicago Sun-Times wrote: "'Quick Change is a funny but not an inspired comedy. It has two directors... and I wonder if that has anything to do with its inability to be more than just efficiently entertaining."
