= Hold-Up (1985 film) =

- French film poster
- Directed by: Alexandre Arcady
- Written by: Alexandre Arcady; Jay Cronley (book)
- Starring: Jean-Paul Belmondo; Kim Cattrall; Guy Marchand; Jean-Pierre Marielle
- Cinematography: Michael Chapman
- Music by: Serge Franklin
- Distributed by: AMLF
- Release date: 23 October 1985
- Running time: 114 minutes
- Countries: Canada; France
- Language: French
- Budget: CAD $8,000,000
- Box office: 2,367,294 admissions (France)

Hold-Up is a Franco-Canadian crime comedy from 1985, starring Jean-Paul Belmondo and directed by Alexandre Arcady. The screenplay by Arcady, Daniel Saint-Hamont and Francis Veber is based on the novel Quick Change by Jay Cronley. The novel was filmed again, as Quick Change (1990), with Bill Murray starring and co-directing.

== Plot ==
Dressed as a clown, Grimm holds up a bank in Montreal and takes 30 hostages. While confusing and ridiculing the police with his behavior, he manages to rid the bank of a fortune, but then a companion arouses trouble...

== Cast ==
- Jean-Paul Belmondo as Grimm
- Kim Cattrall as Lise
- Guy Marchand as Georges
- Jean-Pierre Marielle as Simon Labrosse
- Jacques Villeret as Jeremie
- Jean-Claude de Goros as Inspector Fox
- Tex Konig as Lasky

== Box office ==
The film was the 16th highest-grossing movie of its year in France, and was the first time since 1976 that Belmondo has not delivered a top 10 hit movie.

== Music ==
The music that Grimm plays in Rome is by Nino Rota from La strada (1954), which also features a clown as a main character.

=== Soundtrack ===
The soundtrack, composed by Serge Franklin, was released by Music Box Records and includes the complete score of Alexandre Arcady's Last Summer in Tangiers (1987).
