= Jack (Homes novel) =

1990 debut novel by A.M. Homes

- Author: A. M. Homes
- Language: English
- Published: Vintage
- Publication date: 1990
- Publication place: United States
- Pages: 240

Jack is the 1990 debut novel by American writer A. M. Homes, written when she was 19. She wrote the novel while attending Sarah Lawrence College. It is a bildungsroman or coming-of-age novel, dealing with a 15-year-old boy's grappling with issues of divorce and sexuality in his family and among his friends.

== Plot ==
Jack is a 15-year-old boy who is dealing with the divorce of his parents Anne and Paul, as he starts to develop a crush on his friend Maggie. He must also deal with the subsequent revelation that his father Paul is gay and now living with a male partner after his separation from Anne.

When news of his father's liaison spreads in his high school, Jack is bullied by some students. He learns that his friends also are dealing with difficult issues: Max reveals that his father beats his mother. Maggie has a gay father and shares her feelings about learning that.

== Characters ==
- Jack, 15-year-old boy
- Anne, his mother
- Paul, his father
- Bob, his father's live-in companion
- Michael
- Vermon
- Max, a friend of Jack
- Maggie, a friend of Jack
- Sammy
- Jim
- Eddie Hayes
- Coach

== Reception ==
The book was highly praised by such contemporaries as David Foster Wallace, who noted, “A moving novel, and a very refreshing one. Jack is such an engaging, attractive human being, it’s a pleasure to believe in him.”

Because of its sensitive treatment of issues of divorce, sexuality and spousal abuse, the book has been popular with young adults. It continues to be featured on reading lists for high school and college classes.

== Adaptation ==
Homes adapted her novel as a television film, Jack, writing the screenplay. It aired in 2004 on Showtime TV, starring Anton Yelchin as Jack, and Stockard Channing and Ron Silver as his parents Anne and Paul.
