= Someone to Watch Over Me (film) =

- Theatrical release poster
- Directed by: Ridley Scott
- Written by: Howard Franklin
- Produced by: Thierry de Ganay; Harold Schneider
- Starring: Tom Berenger; Mimi Rogers; Lorraine Bracco
- Cinematography: Steven B. Poster
- Edited by: Claire Simpson
- Music by: Michael Kamen
- Production company: Columbia Pictures
- Distributed by: Columbia Pictures
- Release date: October 9, 1987
- Running time: 106 minutes
- Country: United States
- Language: English
- Budget: $12.8 million
- Box office: $10.3 million

Someone to Watch Over Me is a 1987 American neo-noir romantic thriller film directed by Ridley Scott and written by Howard Franklin. It stars Tom Berenger as a police detective who has to protect a wealthy woman (Mimi Rogers), who is a key witness in a murder trial. The film's soundtrack includes the George and Ira Gershwin song from which the film takes its title, recorded by Sting, and Vangelis' "Memories of Green", originally from Scott's Blade Runner (1982).

Someone to Watch Over Me was released by Columbia Pictures on October 9, 1987. The film received mixed to positive reviews from critics but was a box office bomb, grossing $10.3 million against a $12.8 million budget.

== Plot ==
Socialite Claire Gregory attends a party and art show sponsored by one of her oldest friends, Winn Hockings. Accompanying her is her straitlaced boyfriend, Neil Steinhart. In another part of town, there is another party, this one for newly appointed NYPD detective Mike Keegan.

Winn is accosted by a former partner, Joey Venza, who is angry because Winn had not come to him to borrow money for his new art studio. After a short argument, he stabs Winn to death. Claire witnesses the killing, screams, and is spotted by Venza. He pursues her, but she manages to get back into the elevator just in time.

The police are called in, including Keegan. He is a married man, but immediately falls for Claire. Along with fellow cops, he is assigned to protect Claire until Venza is arrested and she can make a positive ID and later testify in court.

Keegan is determined to protect Claire and goes to extremes to do so. Venza makes numerous threats and attempts on her life, nearly succeeding at one point. Keegan and his wife Ellie separate over his involvement with Claire. He and Claire acknowledge their love but Keegan cannot bring himself to simply abandon his family.

At the end, Venza, who draws out Keegan by taking his son hostage, is shot by Ellie and killed. Claire breaks up with Neil and intends to go to Europe to get over Keegan, who returns to his wife and son.

== Cast ==
- Tom Berenger as Mike Keegan
- Mimi Rogers as Claire Gregory
- Lorraine Bracco as Ellie Keegan
- Jerry Orbach as Lt. Garber
- John Rubinstein as Neil Steinhart
- Andreas Katsulas as Joey Venza
- Daniel Hugh Kelly as Scotty
- Harley Cross as Tommy
- Tony Di Benedetto as T.J.
- Jim Moriarty as Koontz
- Mark Moses as Win Hockings

== Production ==
The film was initially pitched to Scott in 1982 during a dinner party by Howard Franklin. It was primarily written by Franklin by late 1982 with Scott years later bringing in Danilo Bach and David Seltzer to refine it. Ridley Scott made the film following Legend which had been a notable box office failure. In July 1986 Alan Ladd, Jr. announced the film would be made for MGM. By September the project had shifted to Columbia Pictures where David Puttnam, who produced Scott's debut feature The Duellists, was head of production. Tom Berenger was cast in the lead role on the strength of his performance in Platoon.

Principal photography began on December 8, 1986, with the shoot lasting thirteen weeks. Locations included the Bergdorf Goodman Building, Central Park, Guggenheim Museum and various streets on the Upper East Side. Production moved to Burbank Studios on January 19, 1987, to film the interior of Miss Gregory's apartment and Mike Keegan's home in Queens. The interiors used for the nightclub scenes were filmed on the RMS Queen Mary docked in Long Beach.

== Release ==
Someone to Watch Over Me was released in the United States on October 9, 1987. It was the first film greenlit by Puttnam to be released, but by the time it was released, Puttnam had resigned.

=== Home media ===
The film was originally released in the United States on VHS in May 1988 and did better on home video. It was first released on remastered DVD in October 1999 by Sony Pictures with widescreen and full-screen format options, including production notes and theatrical trailers. Shout! Factory released it on Blu-ray under their Shout Select banner on March 12, 2019, including two new extra features, an interview with screenwriter Howard Franklin and an interview with director of photography Steven Poster. Powerhouse Films (Indicator) released the film in the U.K. on limited edition Blu-ray on May 17, 2021, in a 2k restoration containing the aforementioned extras from Shout as well as a new audio commentary from filmmaker and film historian Jim Hemphill and the theatrical trailer.

== Reception ==
=== Box office ===
In the United States and Canada, Someone to Watch Over Me grossed $10.3 million at the box office, against a budget of $12.8 million It opened at No. 4, its first of four consecutive weeks in the Top 10 at the domestic box office.

=== Critical response ===
On the review aggregator website Rotten Tomatoes, 67% of 33 critics' reviews are positive, with an average rating of 5.8/10. The website's consensus reads: "Its plot is sometimes hard to swallow, but some fine acting and director Ridley Scott's stylish visual flair make Someone to Watch Over Me an engaging police thriller." Metacritic, which uses a weighted average, assigned the film a score of 55 out of 100, based on 15 critics, indicating "mixed or average" reviews. Audiences polled by CinemaScore gave the film an average grade of "B+" on an A+ to F scale.

Roger Ebert gave the film two stars out of four and wrote:

There is something fundamentally wrong with a script in which the hero sleeps with the wrong woman. I am not talking here in moral terms, but in story terms. The makers of this film got so carried away by their High Concept that they missed the point of the whole story.

He did, however, praise Lorraine Bracco for playing her role "with great force and imagination." Vincent Canby of The New York Times wrote:

Nothing that happens to these three characters is moving or even exciting. To keep the movie going until its absurd ending, the character of the murderer is changed, midstream, from an ordinary, run-of-the-mill New York mobster into a crazed psychotic. Howard Franklin's screenplay plays less like a feature film than like the pilot for a failed television series about New York policemen.

Variety called the film "a stylish and romantic police thriller which manages, through the sleek direction of Ridley Scott and persuasive ensemble performances, to triumph over several hard-to-swallow plot developments." John Ferguson of Radio Times awarded it four stars out of five, describing it as an "intelligent thriller" which "remains one of Ridley Scott's most quietly satisfying works". He wrote that "it may lack the power of the director's Gladiator, Thelma & Louise and Blade Runner, but this is still beautifully shot and remains a stylish affair", and he praised the performances as "first rate".

Michael Wilmington of the Los Angeles Times called the film "an erotic culture-clash thriller that's almost swoony with glamour and romance. The movie is exciting, richly textured. But, despite its high quality, there's something unformed about it, like a poem that doesn't quite sing, a painting with a color missing." Rita Kempley of The Washington Post called it "a reasonably enjoyable romantic thriller" that "shows off director Ridley Scott's extraordinary visual artistry. The sets are so sumptuous, you'll want to move right in. But the haze is so thick, you'll need to bring a defogger. Scott, who directed Alien and Blade Runner, looks at the world through veils of smog. What with these pictorial pollutants, he loses sight of plot." Pauline Kael observed in The New Yorker that Scott "has put so much morbid, finicky care into this silly little story that he's worried the fun out of it."
