= Howard Franklin =

American screenwriter and film director

- Born: United States
- Occupation(s): Screenwriter, film director
- Spouse: Anne Litt
- Children: Nelson

Howard Franklin is an American screenwriter and film director, known for such films as The Name of the Rose and his three collaborations with Bill Murray: Quick Change, Larger than Life, and The Man Who Knew Too Little. His other films include The Public Eye, about a 1940s tabloid photographer modeled on the photojournalist Weegee and starring Joe Pesci; Someone to Watch Over Me and The Big Year.

== Filmography ==
Year	Title	Director	Writer	Executive Producer	Notes
1984	Romancing the Stone	No	Uncredited	No	Script revisions
1986	The Name of the Rose	No	Yes	No	Co-written with Andrew Birkin, Gérard Brach and Alain Godard
1987	Someone to Watch Over Me	No	Yes	No	
1990	Quick Change	Yes	Yes	No	Co-directed with Bill Murray
1992	The Public Eye	Yes	Yes	No	
1996	Larger than Life	Yes	No	No	
1997	The Man Who Knew Too Little	No	Yes	No	Co-written with Robert Farrar
2001	Antitrust	No	Yes	No	
2007	Fracture	No	Uncredited	No	Script revisions
2011	The Big Year	No	Yes	No	
2015	The King of 7B	No	Yes	Yes	Made-for-television film Co-written with Dan Fogelman
