= Jessica Campbell =

American actress (1982–2020)

- Campbell in the 1999 film Election
- Born: October 30, 1982; Tulsa, Oklahoma, U.S.
- Died: December 29, 2020 (aged 38); Portland, Oregon, U.S.
- Occupation: Actress
- Years active: 1992–2002
- Children: 1

Jessica Campbell (October 30, 1982 – December 29, 2020) was an American actress.

== Biography ==
Campbell was born in Tulsa, Oklahoma. Her acting appearances included the roles of Tammy Metzler in the 1999 film Election, for which she was nominated for an Independent Spirit Award for Best Debut Performance, Julie Gold in the 2001 film The Safety of Objects, and the two-episode guest role of Amy Andrews in the TV series Freaks and Geeks.

After retiring from acting in 2002, Campbell became a naturopathic practitioner. She died at the home of a relative in Portland, Oregon, on December 29, 2020, aged 38. No cause of death was given, but Campbell had suffered from flu-like symptoms on the day of her death.

== Filmography ==
=== Film ===
Year	Title	Role	Notes
1999	Election	Tammy Metzler	
2001	The Safety of Objects	Julie Gold	
2002	Dad's Day	Mary Elizabeth Kelly	Direct-to-video
2002	Junk	Doris	Also co-producer

=== Television ===
Year	Title	Role	Notes
1992	In the Best Interest of the Children	Julie Cain	Television film
2000	Freaks and Geeks	Amy Andrews	2 episodes
