= Jack Gilpin =

American actor (born 1951)

- Born: John Mitchell Gilpin; May 31, 1951 (age 75); Boyce, Virginia, U.S.
- Education: Harvard University
- Occupation: Actor
- Years active: 1981–present
- Spouse: Ann McDonough (m. 1986)
- Children: 3, including Betty Gilpin
- Relatives: Drew Gilpin Faust (cousin)

John Mitchell Gilpin (born May 31, 1951) is an American actor.

== Early life ==
Gilpin was born on May 31, 1951, in Boyce, Virginia, the son of Lucy Trumbull (Mitchell) and Kenneth Newcomer Gilpin, a businessman. His paternal great-grandfather was politician and general Lawrence Tyson. His maternal grandfather was World War I hero and aviation pioneer Gen. William "Billy" Mitchell. His first cousin is Drew Gilpin Faust, who served as president of Harvard University from 2007 to 2018.

Gilpin attended Phillips Exeter Academy, graduating in 1969, and then obtained his undergraduate degree from Harvard University in 1973. He studied acting at the Neighborhood Playhouse School of the theatre in New York City.

== Career ==
He had a recurring role on the TV series Kate & Allie, and is a frequent Law & Order guest star, having appeared in all of the first three series: Law & Order, Law & Order: Special Victims Unit, and Law & Order: Criminal Intent. Gilpin appeared in the films Heartburn, Something Wild, She-Devil, Revenge of the Nerds II: Nerds in Paradise, Quiz Show, Reversal of Fortune, Barcelona, and The Notorious Bettie Page. He had also acted on stage, including in the Broadway production of Getting And Spending.

In 2008, Gilpin appeared in the film 21, playing the role of Bob Phillips who is interviewing student candidates for the fictional "Robinson Scholarship" to attend Harvard Medical School. Gilpin's character appears in the first scene of the film and his words set the stage for the movie's plot; he appears again in the final scene to bring closure to the film.

== Personal life ==
Gilpin is married to actress Ann McDonough. He has three children, including actress Betty Gilpin.

Gilpin was ordained as priest of the Episcopal Church on December 15, 2012. He is currently in charge of St. John's Episcopal Church in New Milford, Connecticut, where he had arrived as a deacon two months prior to his ordination. He had previously been a licensed lay preacher at Christ Church in his hometown of Roxbury, Connecticut.

== Filmography ==
=== Film ===
Year	Title	Role
1985	Compromising Positions	Patrol Car Cop
1986	Heartburn	Ellis
1986	Something Wild	Larry Dillman
1987	Revenge of the Nerds II: Nerds in Paradise	Mr. Comstock
1987	Hiding Out	Dr. Gusick
1988	Funny Farm	Bud Culbertson
1988	The Dream Team	Dr. Talmer
1988	Little Sweetheart	Mr. Harrison
1988	She-Devil	Larry
1990	Quick Change	Yuppie Hostage
1990	Reversal of Fortune	Peter MacIntosh
1994	Barcelona	The Consul
1994	Quiz Show	Jack
1995	Reckless	Weatherman
1996	The Juror	Accountant, Juror
1997	Commandments	Gordon Bloom
1997	Last Breath	Dr. Stevens
1998	Mulan	Bai, Big Twin Hun #1
1999	Random Hearts	David Dotson
1999	Cherry	The Preacher
2000	101 Ways (The Things a Girl Will Do to Keep Her Volvo)	George
2001	The Boys of Sunset Ridge	Simon Longfellow
2005	The Notorious Bettie Page	Roy Page
2007	The Life Before Her Eyes	Mr. McCleod
2008	21	Bob Phillips
2009	Adventureland	Mr. Brennan
2011	Higher Ground	Dr. Adams
2012	Trouble with the Curve	Schwartz
2013	Syrup	Mister Jamieson
2023	A Little White Lie	Narrator

=== Television ===
Year	Title	Role	Notes
1982	As the World Turns	Librarian	
1984–1987	Kate & Allie	Roger	
1985	The Equalizer	Harvey	Episode: "Desperately"
1986	The Equalizer	Harvey	Episode: "Tip on a Sure Thing"
1992	Unnatural Pursuits	Art Novak	
1993	Lifestories: Families in Crisis	Jim Remy	
1994–1996	New York Undercover	Headmaster Scowcroft	
1995	Law & Order	Dr. Simon Reed	
1995	New York News		
1996	Aliens in the Family	Mr. Bellamy	
1997–2001	Law & Order	Mr. Axtell	
1998	From the Earth to the Moon	Ted Sorenson	
1999	Cosby	Mr. Harris	
2001	Big Apple	Laurent Holbein	
2001	100 Centre Street	Richard Quince	
2002	One Life to Live	Joel Miranda	
2003	Law & Order: Criminal Intent	Dr. Michael Roland	
2003	Ed	Herzog	
2003	Law & Order: Special Victims Unit	Ron Wolcott	
2006	3 lbs	Dr. Wardell	
2007	Damages	Headmaster Lalas	
2012	30 Rock	Douglas	
2012	The Good Wife	Frank Anderson	
2012	My America		
2013	Alpha House	Senate Chaplain Teeter	
2014	Forever	Conrad Carlyle	
2015	Madam Secretary	Frank Anderson	
2016	The Night Of	Doctor	
2016–2021	Billions	Sean Ayles	
2018	Succession	Mr. Wambsgans	
2019	The Last O.G.	Curlan Guillory	
2020	The Blacklist	Mr. Fenberg	
2020	Power Book II: Ghost	Martin Saxe	
2022–present	The Gilded Age	Church	

== Awards and nominations ==
Year	Association	Category	Project	Result	Ref.
2023	Screen Actors Guild Awards	Outstanding Ensemble in a Drama Series	The Gilded Age	Nominated	
