= Funny Farm (film) =

1988 film by George Roy Hill

- Theatrical release poster by Steven Chorney
- Directed by: George Roy Hill
- Screenplay by: Jeffrey Boam
- Based on: Funny Farm by Jay Cronley
- Produced by: Robert L. Crawford
- Starring: Chevy Chase; Madolyn Smith; Joseph Maher; Jack Gilpin; Brad Sullivan; MacIntyre Dixon
- Cinematography: Miroslav Ondrícek
- Edited by: Alan Heim
- Music by: Elmer Bernstein
- Production companies: Pan Arts, Inc.
- Distributed by: Warner Bros. Pictures
- Release date: June 3, 1988
- Running time: 101 minutes
- Country: United States
- Language: English
- Budget: $19 million
- Box office: $25 million

Funny Farm is a 1988 American comedy film starring Chevy Chase and Madolyn Smith. The film was adapted from a 1985 comedic novel of the same name by Jay Cronley. It was the final film directed by George Roy Hill before his death in 2002.

== Plot ==
Andy Farmer is a New York City sports writer who moves with his kindergarten teaching wife, Elizabeth, to the seemingly charming town of Redbud, Vermont, so he can write a novel. They do not get along well with the residents, and other quirks arise such as being given exorbitant funeral bills for Claude Musselman, a long-dead man buried on their land years before they acquired the house.

Marital troubles soon arise from the quirkiness of Redbud as well as the fact that Elizabeth was critical of Andy's manuscript, while writing her own manuscripts for children's books. Andy's publisher Michael Sinclair comes to town to personally see the manuscript after letters informing him of his deadline go unanswered. To avoid having to return the advance that Sinclair gave him, Andy takes one of Elizabeth's manuscripts and passes it off as his own. After Elizabeth receives a call from Sinclair praising the work on "his children's book", she leaves Andy out of anger.

They soon decide to divorce and sell their home. To expedite the sale, the Farmers offer the town's residents a $15,000 donation to Redbud and $50 cash each if they help make a good impression on their prospective home buyers. To make good on the deal, the citizens remake Redbud into a perfect Norman Rockwell-style town. Their charade dazzles Bud and Betsy Culbertson, a pair of prospective buyers, who make the Farmers an offer on the house. However, Andy declines to sell after realizing that he genuinely enjoys small-town living.

Andy and Elizabeth decide to stay together in Redbud, much to the chagrin of the locals, who are now angry that they lost their promised money. Though Mayor Barclay does not hold the Farmers liable for the $15,000, as the sale of their house did not occur, Andy decides to pay everyone in Redbud their $50, which helps improve his standing among the townspeople. The film ends with Andy taking a job as a sportswriter for the Redbud newspaper, and Elizabeth, pregnant with their first child, having written multiple children's stories.

== Cast ==
- Chevy Chase as Andy Farmer
- Madolyn Smith as Elizabeth Farmer
- Kevin O'Morrison as Sheriff Ledbetter
- Alice Drummond as Ethel Dinges
- Mike Starr as Crocker
- Glenn Plummer as Mickey
- Joseph Maher as Michael Sinclair
- MacIntyre Dixon as Mayor Barclay
- Bill Fagerbakke as Lon Criterion
- Nicholas Wyman as Dirk Criterion
- William Newman as Gus Lotterhand
- Kevin Conway as Crum Petree
- Brad Sullivan as Brock
- Dakin Matthews as Marion Corey, Jr.
- Audrie J. Neenan as Ivy
- Nesbitt Blaisdell as Hank
- William Duell as Mac
- Helen Lloyd Breed as Old Telephone Operator
- Kit Le Fevre as Young Telephone Operator
- Jack Gilpin as Bud Culbertson
- Caris Corfman as Betsy Culbertson

== Production ==
Screenwriter Jeffrey Boam said he "loved" the Jay Cronley book Funny Farm. "It was exactly the kind of movie I always wanted to write,” said Boam. “It needed a lot of work because it wasn’t told in the fashion that could be filmed, but I loved the idea of working with Chevy. He was a comedy hero of mine and still is.”

Boam says the tone of the film changed from what he expected when director George Roy Hill signed. "George wanted to do a much classier version than I ever imagined it to be," said Boam. "I imagined it to be a little cruder, more low-brow humor, rougher and more like the movies Chevy was doing at the time, but George was a classy guy and he wasn’t going to do that. He does what he does. He made the movie classy, and I think a lot of Chevy’s fans were let down because it wasn’t as raucous and vulgar as they might have expected."

== Filming ==
The movie was filmed between August and November 1987 on location in Vermont, mostly in Townshend, Vermont. The New York City apartment at the beginning of the movie is located at the Apthorp, 2211 Broadway. The house bought by Andy (Chase) and Elizabeth Farmer (Madolyn Smith) is on Fire Pond Road, Grafton, Vermont. Townshend locals frequently blame the film for the irregular sized trees on their town common, with all but one tree allegedly being inadvertently killed when the filmmakers dyed them autumnal colors; the filmmakers paid for replacements to be planted.

== Reception ==
Funny Farm received mixed reviews at the time of its release. On Rotten Tomatoes, the film has a 64% rating, based on 22 reviews, with an average rating of 5.1/10.

Vincent Canby, in his review for The New York Times, called the film "good-natured even when it's not funny," and went on to say that its best jokes are recycled from other, better, films. In a negative review for the Los Angeles Times, Michael Wilmington said "Funny Farm – a weak-fish-out-of-water comedy about a New York City couple who see their rural paradise turned into a rustic hell–is a movie with a doubly deceptive title. This movie isn't about a farm, and it isn't very funny, either." In a staff review, Variety said, "As pleasant yuppie comedies go, this is about par."

However, film critics Roger Ebert and Gene Siskel were strong champions of the film, praising it on The Oprah Winfrey Show, The Tonight Show Starring Johnny Carson, and At the Movies. Ebert called the film a "small miracle," while Siskel said it was "the best film Chase has made" and compared it to the films of Preston Sturges. Siskel and Ebert collectively praised the script's numerous laugh-out-loud moments, the strong direction, the beautiful cinematography, and editing which consistently ends scenes at just the right moment.

The film grossed $25 million on a $19 million budget, making it a modest box office success, but was seen as an overall disappointment especially considering Chevy Chase's popularity as a comic actor in the 1980s with a handful of box office hits. It was released during a very busy summer movie season. The Tom Hanks comedy Big, now considered a classic, opened the same day and became one of the year's highest-grossing films while Crocodile Dundee II was in its second week of release and also became one of the year's biggest hits. Other releases throughout the summer, including Coming to America, Who Framed Roger Rabbit, and Die Hard, all were very high-grossing films, giving Funny Farm a slim chance of high box-office results in comparison.

Then-U.S. President Ronald Reagan viewed this film at Camp David on June 11, 1988.
