= A. M. Homes =

American writer (born 1961)

Amy M. Homes
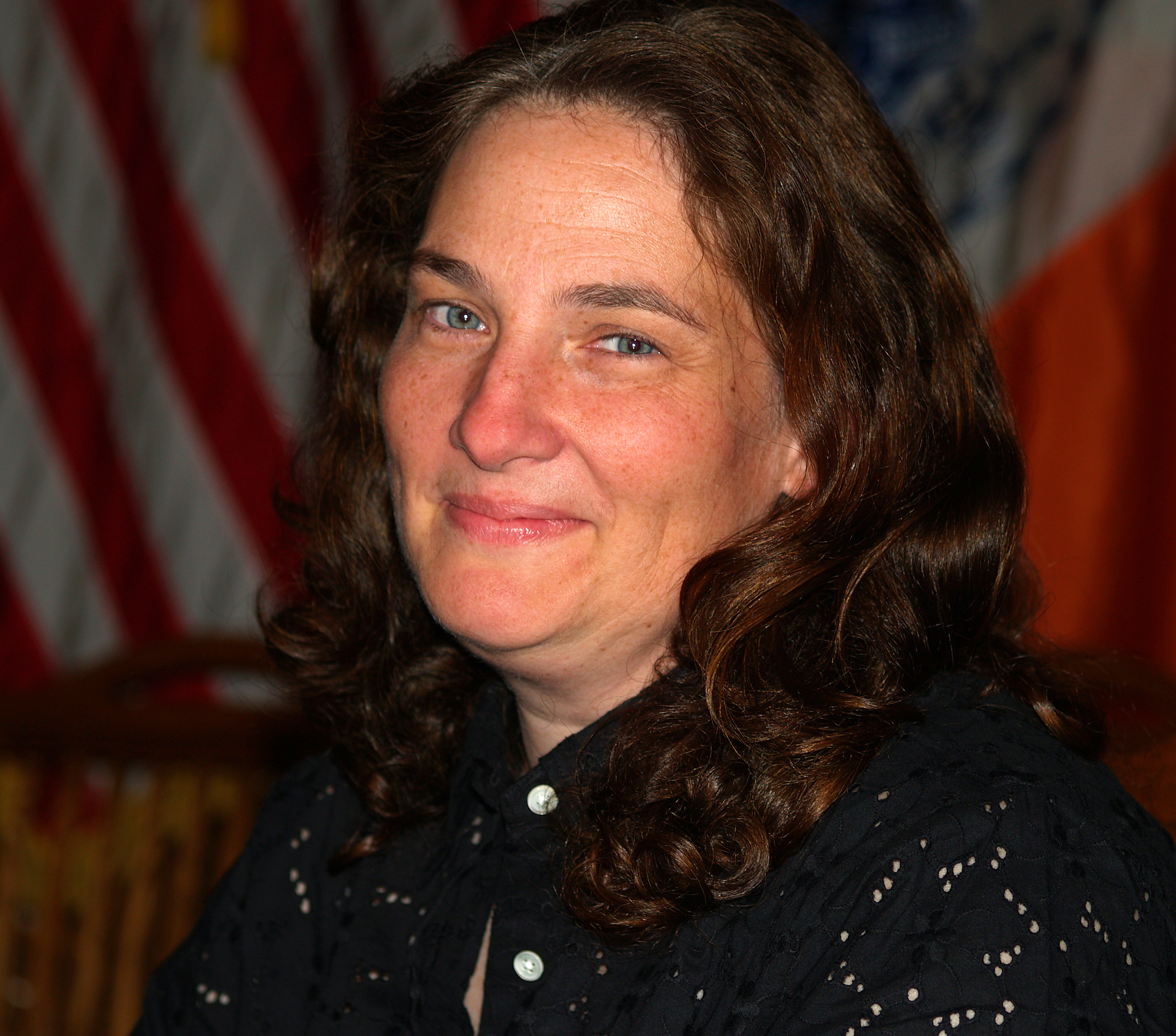
- A. M. Homes
- Born: December 18, 1961 (age 64); Washington, D.C., U.S.
- Education: Bethesda-Chevy Chase High School; American University; Sarah Lawrence College (BA); Iowa Writers' Workshop (MFA)
- Occupations: Fiction writer; memoirist; screenwriter
- Children: Juliet Homes
- Writing career
- Pen name: A. M. Homes
- Period: 1989–present
- Notable works: The End of Alice (1996)
- Website: www.amhomesbooks.com

Amy M. Homes (pen name A. M. Homes; born December 18, 1961) is an American writer best known for her controversial novels and unusual short stories, which feature extreme situations and characters. Notably, her novel The End of Alice (1996) is about a convicted child molester and murderer.

Homes, who was adopted at birth, met her biological parents for the first time when she was 31 and published a memoir, The Mistress's Daughter (2007) about her exploration of her expanded "family." Her novel May We Be Forgiven was published by Viking Books in 2012; its first chapter was published in the 100th issue of Granta (in 2008; edited by William Boyd), and was selected by Salman Rushdie for The Best American Short Stories 2008. The novel won the Women's Prize for Fiction in 2013. Her latest novel, The Unfolding, was published by Viking on September 6, 2022.

== Early life ==
Amy Michael Homes was born in 1961 in Washington, D.C. and given up for adoption at birth. She was raised in Chevy Chase, Maryland and, after graduating from Bethesda-Chevy Chase High School, attended American University.

Homes received her Bachelor of Arts in 1985 from Sarah Lawrence College, where she studied with author Grace Paley and then earned a Master of Fine Arts from the Iowa Writers' Workshop.

== Career ==
Homes has written both short stories and novels; the former published in such leading magazines as Granta, The New Yorker, McSweeney's, and BOMB.

=== Novels ===
She wrote her first novel, Jack, when she was 19, but it wasn't published until 1989, when she was 28 and had already published some short stories. An exploration of family life and sexuality, Jack features a son of divorced parents who learns that his father is gay. The book was critically praised and is still featured in school and college reading lists. Homes wrote a screenplay film adaptation by the same name, produced in 2004 for the Showtime cable network.

Her second novel, In a Country of Mothers (1993), centers on an adopted girl and her psychotherapist, who begins to think this patient might be the daughter she herself had given up at birth. (Homes was writing this novel, and its publication was in production, before her own birth mother tracked her down, in 1992.)

Homes's 1996 novel The End of Alice is narrated mostly by a convicted child molester and murderer, imprisoned in the West Block of Sing Sing. The Pulitzer Prize-winning author Michael Cunningham described this work as:

"...dark and treacherous as ice on a highway. It establishes A. M. Homes as one of the bravest, most terrifying writers working today. She never plays it safe, and it begins to look as if she can do almost anything."

It aroused considerable controversy and received mixed reviews due to its thorny subject matter and objectionable protagonists (in the UK, bookseller W.H. Smith refused to carry it).

Homes published the first chapter of her 1999 novel Music for Torching as a short story in The New Yorker. The novel features characters who appeared in the short stories of her first collection, The Safety of Objects, including a suburban couple that deliberately burns down their own house. Jill Adams in The Barcelona Review described it as having Homes's "trademark style of wry humor, applied to the uncanny dissection of suburbia’s facade." Britain's The Observer found it "immensely disturbing." People magazine called the novel "haunting," and Gary Krist in The New York Times described it as"

"...[a] nasty and willfully grotesque novel. The fact is, I was at times appalled by the book, annoyed by it, angered by it. Its ending struck me as cynical and manipulative. But even so, I found myself rapt from beginning to end, fascinated by Homes's single-minded talent for provocation."

He concluded with a caveat: "In her last two novels, the desire to outrage is so conspicuous that it risks obscuring her powerful gifts as a novelist."

In This Book Will Save Your Life (2006), a novel set in Los Angeles, she satirized the culture of the city's upper-class residents. It features "a rich, isolated man who suffers a physical crisis and goes on a wild compassion spree." The Guardian said, "it was kitschy and bordered on the inane, but [had] something appealing about its mixture of the apocalyptic and the perkily upbeat, [captured] by John Waters when he said: 'If Oprah went insane, this might be her favourite book.'"

With May We Be Forgiven (2012), Homes returned to the setting of several of her prior novels: Westchester County, New York. With a violence-packed, emotional incident in its first chapter, it won the Women's Prize for Fiction (formerly the Orange Prize), awarded in the United Kingdom.The Guardian review described it as, "a novel about forgiveness, family, intimacy, consumerism and the myth of success." The reviewer said, "AM Homes can't really be compared to any other writer; no one else is quite as dark and funny and elegant, all at the same time."

=== Short stories ===
Homes's first short-story collection, The Safety of Objects, was published in 1990. Writing in the Los Angeles Times, Amy Hempel wrote: "Homes is confident and consistent in her odd departures from life as we know it, sustaining credibility by getting the details right." The book was adapted as an independent feature film of the same name, released in 2001 and starring Glenn Close, among others. Homes co-wrote the screenplay with the movie's director, Rose Troche.

Writing in The Guardian in 2003, author Ali Smith described Homes's second short story collection, Things You Should Know, as "funny and glinting and masterful, light as air, strange as a dream, monstrous as truth: the real and classic thing."

Homes's third collection of stories, Days of Awe, was published in 2018.

=== Journalism ===
Homes's articles and essays have appeared in magazines including The New Yorker, Artforum, Vanity Fair, and McSweeney's. She has also been a contributing editor to BOMB since 1995, where she has published articles and interviews with various artists and writers, such as Eric Fischl, Tobias Wolff, and Adam Bartos.

=== Memoir ===
In 2004, The New Yorker published "The Mistress's Daughter," her essay about meeting her biological parents for the first time, at age 31. Her mother, unmarried when Amy was born, had immediately surrendered her baby for adoption through a lawyer's office. Homes expanded the essay with greater exploration of her biological family members and published her memoir, also called The Mistress's Daughter, in 2007.

=== Television ===
Homes wrote for season two of the television drama series The L Word and produced its third season. She developed an HBO series, The Hamptons, about eastern Long Island's ocean-side resort towns, a series she described as "a cross between Desperate Housewives and Grapes of Wrath."

Since 2010, Homes has been developing television pilots for CBS with Timberman/Beverly Productions. In 2013, she was developing Koethi Zan's best-selling novel The Never List as a dramatic series for CBS television. Homes was a writer and co-executive producer on both the 2017 USA series Falling Water and the Stephen King series Mr. Mercedes (which David E. Kelley developed.

== Personal life ==
Homes lives in New York City with her daughter, Juliet, born in March 2003. She has taught in the writing programs at Columbia University, The New School, and New York University. In 2008, she began teaching in the Creative Writing Program at Princeton University.

In her memoir The Mistress's Daughter, Homes describes separately meeting both her birth parents for the first time when she was 31. Her birth mother, Ellen Ballman, had had a years-long affair with her much older, married boss, Norman Hecht, during which she became pregnant, at age 22. The relationship ended before Homes's birth. In 1992, Ballman initiated contact with Homes through the intermediary lawyer. Homes and Ballman became acquainted, and it later it emerged that Ballman hoped her daughter might donate a kidney to her. She died of complications from kidney disease in 1998. At the request of Homes's biological father, she took a DNA test in 1993 to verify his paternity. She subsequently met some members of her father's official family, but was not welcomed into their homes.

Asked about her sexuality, Homes said in an April 2007 interview in The Washington Post, "I've dated men and I've dated women, and there's no more or less to it than that." In an interview with Diva magazine, she said, "I am bisexual, but I wouldn't necessarily define myself that way."

Once a guest artist at the artists' collective Yaddo, Homes was named its co-chairwoman with Susan Unterberg in 2013. "Without Yaddo, I wouldn't exist as a writer," said Homes, "Yaddo gives artists the increasingly rare gift of a time and place to do one's work, suspended from the intrusive buzz of the every day. I am forever indebted."

== Awards ==
Homes has received numerous awards, including a Guggenheim Fellowship, a National Endowment for the Arts Fellowship, a Cullman Center for Scholars and Writers Fellowship from the New York Public Library, New York Foundation for the Arts fellowships, and the Deutscher Jugendliteraturpreis. Her work has been translated into 22 languages.

In June 2013, she won the prestigious Women's Prize for Fiction (formerly called the Orange Prize for Fiction) for her novel May We Be Forgiven (2012).

== Bibliography ==
=== Books ===
==== Novels ====
- Jack (1989)
- In a Country of Mothers (1993)
- The End of Alice (1996)
- Appendix A: An Elaboration on the Novel The End of Alice (1996)
- Music for Torching (1999)
- This Book Will Save Your Life (2006)
- May We Be Forgiven (2012)
- The Unfolding (2022)

==== Story collections ====
- The Safety of Objects (1990)
- Things You Should Know (2002)
- Days of Awe (2018)

==== Non-fiction ====
- Los Angeles: People, Places, and the Castle on the Hill (2002)
- On the Street 1980–1990 by Amy Arbus, introduction by Homes
- The Mistress's Daughter (2007)

=== Essays and reporting ===
- Homes, A. M. (June 2013). "Curious George". Spotlight. Vanity Fair. Vol. 634. p. 105.
- Homes, A. M. (June 2018). "On Writing Letters to Famous Strangers". Essays. The Paris Review.
