= The End of Alice =

Novel by A.M. Homes

- Author: A. M. Homes
- Publisher: Scribner (US); Anchor Books (UK)
- Publication date: March 1, 1996
- ISBN: 0-684-81528-1

The End of Alice is a 1996 novel by American writer A. M. Homes. It was published in the United States by Scribner and in the United Kingdom by Anchor Books.

The story is narrated mostly by a middle-aged pedophile and child killer who is serving a life sentence. He receives correspondence from a 19-year-old girl who plans to seduce a 12-year-old neighborhood boy. The child killer encourages her and gives her tips on grooming children. He delights in the girl's letters detailing her progress. The scenes involving the girl (who is never named) are written from a third-person perspective.

== Plot summary ==
When the novel opens, a pedophile and child murderer – identified only as "Chappy" – has been in prison for 23 years. (He narrates most of the novel, including accounts of his treatment by his unstable, emotionally and sexually abusive mother.) Now in his 50s and with a parole hearing approaching, Chappy tells of receiving a letter from an unnamed 19-year-old girl who takes a morbid interest in his case. She tells him that she is on summer holiday from college and plans to groom a 12-year-old boy named Matthew, who lives in her neighborhood.

Chappy encourages the girl, and she soon begins to accomplish her goals. He eagerly reads the girl's letters as she describes her successes, though he berates her for her poor grammar and for her liberal use of exclamation points. As the girl corresponds with Chappy, he recounts his past, contrasting events in his life with the explicit details given by the girl of how she grooms Matthew, who is an outcast and easy to manipulate. She gives Matthew tennis lessons, and eventually becomes his babysitter. While babysitting she exposes herself to Matthew and she begins to rape him regularly.

During the novel, Chappy refers frequently to "Alice", his 12-year-old victim, whom he continuously sexually assaulted. During his parole hearing, it is revealed that he brutally murdered and decapitated Alice after she protested that the assault resulted in bleeding. He tried to convince her it was the start of her period, but she did not listen. He overpowered and killed her, framing the exchange as Alice provoking him with a fight.

The girl's sexual abuse of Matthew ends when she goes to Europe for an end-of-summer trip. While traveling, she receives a letter from her parents, who have found a letter from the narrator and know what she has done; they write that she will need to "see someone" when she returns home.

== Release and controversy ==
The book generated significant controversy and received mixed reviews in the United States and even more so in the United Kingdom. It was criticized for its explicit scenes of child sexual abuse and prison rape, and for its sympathetic portrayal of two protagonists who believe that sexually abusing minors is perfectly acceptable. Defenders of the book argued that, as it was written mostly from the perspective of the pedophiles, it needed to express their beliefs.

When the novel was published in the UK in 1997, representatives of the National Society for the Prevention of Cruelty to Children (NSPCC) complained about it and appealed to bookstores not to stock it. Only W. H. Smith observed this request. The NSPCC's spokesman, Jim Harding, described The End of Alice as "the most vile and perverted novel I've ever read."

== Reception ==
Randall Kenan of Elle, wrote: "Homes manages — with language both lyrical and frighteningly direct — to usher the reader into the horrific landscape of a disturbed mind and, at the same time, of a funny, vulnerable, ultimately very sad human being."

The Barcelona Review said The End of Alice is a novel that "rings true from beginning to end, that adds real insight into its characters and their worlds, that crawls under the skin, disturbs, digs at the reader's own psyche, and pushes [them] into a new position in the author-reader relationship."
