= May We Be Forgiven =

2012 novel by A. M. Homes

- Author: A. M. Homes
- Publisher: Viking
- Publication date: 2012
- Pages: 480 pp.
- Awards: Baileys Women's Prize for Fiction
- ISBN: 0-670-02548-8
- OCLC: 778828024

May We Be Forgiven is a 2012 novel by American writer A. M. Homes. It won the 2013 Baileys Women's Prize for Fiction.

== Writing and publication ==
What became the first chapter of the novel was published as a short story in Granta Magazine 100th issue in 2007. It was selected by Salman Rushdie for The Best American Short Stories 2008. Homes went on to develop characters and plot as a novel.

== Plot ==
The central character is Harry Silver, a professor based in New York City whose specialty is "Nixonology", the study of former US President Richard Nixon. His brother George is a TV executive who ends up in a psychiatric ward after a car accident in which two people die. Harry falls into an affair with George's wife Jane while trying to comfort and assist her. After walking out of the hospital, George finds them together and kills Jane. He is committed to a mental institution for the murder. This horrific first chapter of loss sets up the rest of the novel.

In the aftermath of the scandal, Harry's wife leaves him. He moves from Manhattan into George's suburban life to care for his dog, and nephew and niece, a boy and a girl who each attend elite boarding schools. Harry functions as an innocent abroad in this different world, allowing for numerous satirical encounters and observations. He goes through a kind of redemption, cobbling together a kind of family, including three generations.

== Critical reaction ==
Garth Risk Hallberg in The New York Times found influences of authors Don DeLillo and John Cheever in Homes' earlier work and this novel, saying while "Homes’s early work traded on the dissonance between the former’s 'Kulturkritik' and the latter’s introspection, “May We Be Forgiven” fumbles toward harmony." He criticised Homes' style as too flat and minimalistic. He noted that Harry is "a figurative cousin to Jack Gladney, the “Hitler studies” scholar in DeLillo’s “White Noise”." Hallberg found the book to be overly detailed and its satire superficial and dated. The review concluded by saying the novel was "a picaresque in which nothing much happens, a confession we can’t quite believe, a satire whose targets are already dead."

The Guardian found it a "very uneven novel, rickety, meandering and repetitive", impressive in its humor but featuring "an uneasy mixture of truism (be nice to children, animals, strangers) and kitsch (form friendships with immigrants who work at fast food outlets, listen to the wise medicine man)". It concluded, "'May We Be Forgiven' is a semi-serious, semi-effective, semi-brilliant novel which could not be called, overall, an artistic success. But you'd have to have no sense of the absurd, and no sense of humour, not to be pretty impressed." The Independent found it very entertaining, with "delicious black humour, her sharp characterisation, and – yes – that thrilling narrative intensity." Critic David Evans thought the work was too particular to stand for "state-of-the-nation" satire, as another critic had characterized it.

The novel won the 2013 Women's Prize for Fiction, an annual literary award for novels by women writers published in English in the United Kingdom in the previous year.
