= The Safety of Objects =

2001 film

- Theatrical release poster
- Directed by: Rose Troche
- Written by: Rose Troche; A. M. Homes
- Based on: The Safety of Objects by A. M. Homes
- Produced by: Dorothy Berwin; Christine Vachon
- Starring: Glenn Close; Dermot Mulroney; Jessica Campbell; Patricia Clarkson; Joshua Jackson; Moira Kelly; Robert Klein; Timothy Olyphant; Mary Kay Place
- Cinematography: Enrique Chediak
- Edited by: Geraldine Peroni
- Music by: Barb Morrison; Charles Nieland; Nance Nieland
- Production companies: Clear Blue Sky; Renaissance Films; Infilm; Killer Films
- Distributed by: IFC Films
- Release date: April 24, 2001
- Running time: 121 minutes
- Countries: United Kingdom; United States
- Language: English
- Box office: $319,299

The Safety of Objects is a 2001 American drama film based upon a collection of short stories of the same name written by A. M. Homes and published in 1990. It features four suburban families who find that their lives become intertwined. The film was directed by Rose Troche, who co-wrote the screenplay with Homes. It touches upon many issues of the human experience in life. There are about 15 major characters in the film.

Glenn Close plays Esther Gold, the mother of several children, including a son in a coma from a car accident. The other characters are related to the accident either directly or indirectly. As the story continues, the audience learns that all of the characters are connected in ways that they never knew.

== Plot summary ==
In a suburban neighborhood, Paul Gold lies in his bedroom in a coma caused by a traumatic car accident. He is cared for by his mother, Esther, who in tending him closely has distanced herself from her husband Howard and young daughter Julie. Trying to elicit her mother's attention, Julie enters Esther in a local radio contest, hoping to win a brand-new car.

Meanwhile, after years of putting his job first, Jim Train feels his family, especially his efficient wife Susan, no longer needs him. He tries to reconnect with his son Jake (Alex House), on the edge of puberty, but the youth is preoccupied with romantic fantasies about his younger sister's twelve-inch plastic doll. After Jim is skipped over for a promotion, he stops going to work, claiming that a bomb threat was called into his office. Feeling unappreciated by his family, he convinces Esther and Julie to let him help them win the car.

The Trains' neighbor, Helen Christianson, feeling older and less desirable, tries new products to keep her feeling young. She succeeds only in alienating her husband, who loves her as she is.

Helen's good friend, Annette Jennings, in the midst of a messy divorce, struggles to provide financially for her two daughters. Sam, the older tomboyish daughter, is desperate to go to camp that summer. Sam's younger sister has mental disabilities and requires special schooling, which her father, Annette's ex-husband, refuses to pay for. Annette is also mourning the loss of Paul, with whom she was having a relationship. Randy, the neighborhood's landscaper, is coping (poorly) with his own younger brother's death in the same car accident that grievously injured Paul Gold.

Annette's ex-husband comes to visit his daughters. He says that he wants to take Sam on a holiday. Annette refuses because Sam is not interested in spending time with her father, and her ex-husband does not want to care for the younger daughter. Sam overhears their argument and runs away from her father when he tries to talk to her at the park. Soon she bumps into Randy, who tells her that her mom instructed him to pick her up.

Randy takes Sam to a remote cabin in the woods and keeps her there, not allowing her to call home. He calls her 'Johnny', after his late brother. After what appears to be three days, Randy starts driving back to the suburb, to recreate the night when the characters' lives intersected. When the beer he asks Sam to hand him does not explode, he appears to realize that the person in the back seat is Sam, not his brother.

Esther eventually gets to the final two slots in the radio contest, only to pull out at the last moment after nearly three days of physical and emotional taxation. Julie becomes angry and runs off. Jim, angry at what he feels is an inadequate second-place prize, becomes violent and wrecks the area. He gets chased off by Bobby, Helen's son, who works as the mall security guard. Esther, who finally realizes how much she has neglected her daughter, goes home and tearfully suffocates her son. Jim returns to his home, and Randy lets Sam go home. Helen almost cheats on her husband, but eventually returns home without taking that step.

A flashback reveals the cause of the car crash: Randy, Paul, and Randy's younger brother Johnny were traveling in a car after a gig that Paul's band played. Johnny gave Randy and Paul beers which he had shaken, and they exploded when opened, on Paul who was driving. Another car, carrying Julie and Bobby, came from the opposite direction, speeding to rush Julie home after an impromptu tryst so she would not get in trouble for violating her curfew. Both drivers became distracted, both cars had to swerve, and Paul's car crashed and flipped over. The guilt that has consumed both Randy and Julie throughout the film, is shown to have originated from each taking blame for the crash.

Each acknowledges their heightened understanding of the effects of these events in their lives and choices, and lastly, the interconnectedness of these families.

== Cast ==
- Glenn Close as Esther Gold
- Dermot Mulroney as Jim Train
- Jessica Campbell as Julie Gold
- Patricia Clarkson as Annette Jennings
- Joshua Jackson as Paul Gold
- Moira Kelly as Susan Train
- Robert Klein as Howard Gold
- Timothy Olyphant as Randy
- Mary Kay Place as Helen Christianson
- Kristen Stewart as Sam Jennings
- Alex House as Jake Train
- Charlotte Arnold as Sally Christianson
- Aaron Ashmore as Bobby Christianson
- C. David Johnson as Wayne Christianson

== Reception ==
Rotten Tomatoes, a review aggregator, reports that 49% of 73 surveyed critics gave the film a positive review; the average rating is 6.20/10. The site's consensus reads: "The large cast of characters and scripting are too unwieldy, and the suburban angst theme feels tired." Metacritic calculated an average rating of 58/100 based on 29 reviews, which it terms "mixed or average reviews". Eddie Cockrell of Variety called it a "masterful" film with "a refreshing lack of cynicism and irony". Rating it 2/4 stars, Roger Ebert of the Chicago Sun-Times described it as "a literate soap opera". A. O. Scott wrote in The New York Times that Trouche "assembles the damaged human elements of Ms. Homes's world with patience and precision, and more often than not chooses dry understatement over easy satire or obvious sentiment". Los Angeles Times critic Kevin Thomas said that it is "so intense emotionally that had it come in half an hour earlier it could have retained far greater impact". Writing for the San Francisco Chronicle, Mick LaSalle called the film "a noble attempt that doesn't hang together".
