= Let It Ride (film) =

1989 film by Joe Pytka

- Theatrical release poster
- Directed by: Joe Pytka
- Screenplay by: Nancy Dowd (as "Ernest Morton")
- Based on: Good Vibes by Jay Cronley
- Produced by: David Giler
- Starring: Richard Dreyfuss; David Johansen; Teri Garr; Allen Garfield
- Cinematography: Curtis Wehr
- Edited by: Dede Allen; Jim Miller
- Music by: Giorgio Moroder
- Production company: Paramount Pictures
- Distributed by: Paramount Pictures
- Release date: August 18, 1989 (United States)
- Running time: 90 minutes
- Country: United States
- Language: English
- Budget: $18 million
- Box office: $4.9 million

Let It Ride is a 1989 American comedy film. It was directed by Joe Pytka (in his feature non-documentary debut) from a screenplay by Nancy Dowd (credited as Ernest Morton) based on the 1979 novel Good Vibes by Jay Cronley. It stars Richard Dreyfuss, David Johansen, Teri Garr, and Allen Garfield. The story is centered on a normally unsuccessful habitual gambler who experiences a day in which he wins every bet he places, and focuses on the personality contrasts and the perpetually upbeat, hopeful attitudes of losers.

Let It Ride was primarily filmed at Hialeah Park Race Track, which was closed in 2001 and reopened on November 28, 2009. The film was released in the United States on August 18, 1989, by Paramount Pictures.

== Plot ==
Jay Trotter and his best friend Looney are cab drivers working the night shift in Miami, Florida. Looney records his passengers' private conversations with a hidden microphone. He has a new tape of two men talking about an upcoming horse race and how one of the horses, due to unethical practices by its owner and trainer, is sure to win. Trotter and Looney go to the track to place a $50 win bet on the horse, named Charity, despite the fact that Trotter told his wife Pam that he would quit betting forever. In the restroom of the bar next door to the racetrack, he prays, asking for just one big day. A man exiting the bathrooms overhears him and says to let it ride. Trotter places a $50 bet on the tipped horse, who wins and pays $28.40 to win (earning Trotter $710).

Armed with newfound confidence, Trotter approaches the two men from Looney's cab ride and gives them the tape of their taxi conversation. Out of gratitude, they give Trotter a tip for the next race, a necktie, and a ticket to the Jockey Club. He places a large bet on Faith Healer and wins again.

Sensing that this could be his "lucky day," Trotter intends to "let it ride" (parlaying all of his track winnings on every race), on a horse named Lord Byron. Just before the next race, before he can make another bet, he is arrested in a case of mistaken identity. After he is released, he realizes the horse he was going to bet has lost. Now, he really feels this is his "lucky day". Trotter resumes his lucky wagering streak. As he accumulates more money and uses his new clubhouse friends' membership in the track's exclusive clubhouse dining room, he starts meeting other well-to-do gamblers, including the wealthy Mrs. Davis and a sexy vixen named Vicki. Trotter soon becomes a hero to the ticket seller, who despite working decades in the industry has never seen a gambler as great as Trotter. He also visits the customers of the track's bar.

However, Trotter has neglected his wife Pam, who realizes he must be at the racetrack. She confronts him at the track clubhouse and flies into a rage. Trotter calms her and tells her of his hot streak. Unable to decide on a horse in the next race, he takes a survey of the track patrons and, eliminating any selection they give him, bets on the remaining horse, Fleet Dreams, who wins. In the excitement, Vicky embraces Trotter, and Greenberg pulls her off. Trotter is asked to leave the Jockey club. Trotter decides to call it a day and goes home to Pam, buying her a diamond necklace on the way. At home, he finds Pam intoxicated and passed out.

He heads back to the track to help the patrons of Marty's bar across the street, but when he suggests sharing his luck by betting their money together, they all balk at the idea. Disconcerted, Trotter goes for a walk around the track. Vicki suddenly offers to go to bed with him. He turns her down by professing his love for his wife.

After Looney advises him not to, Trotter makes a bet of $68,000 on Hot to Trot. As the race begins, Looney and Trotter argue, and the main characters all make resolutions. Vicki vows to give up rich guys and consider a poor one, looking at Looney. The race comes down to a photo finish. While everyone awaits the result, Pam shows up to thank Jay for his gift and to tell him not to worry about the money, when the announcer reports the winner: Hot to Trot.

The total winnings from Trotter's bet on the last race at 40:1 odds would have netted him around $2.7 million. However, the large wager dropped the odds on Hot To Trot down to 8:1, netting Trotter $612,000 (worth $1.7 million in 2026 dollars).

== Cast ==
- Richard Dreyfuss as Jay Trotter
- David Johansen as Looney
- Teri Garr as Pam Trotter
- Jennifer Tilly as Vicki
- Allen Garfield as Greenberg
- Robbie Coltrane as Ticket Seller
- Michelle Phillips as Mrs. Davis
- Cynthia Nixon as Evangeline
- Ralph Seymour as Sid
- Richard Edson as Johnny Casino
- Trevor Denman as Race Track Announcer
- Edward Walsh as Marty (as Ed Walsh)

== Reception ==
On the review aggregator website Rotten Tomatoes, 36% of 11 critics' reviews are positive, with an average rating of 4.9/10. Metacritic, which uses a weighted average, assigned the film a score of 33 out of 100, based on 9 critics, indicating "generally unfavorable" reviews.

== Trivia ==
- The script originally called for Vicki's top to come open during the scene at the Jockey Club. Jennifer Tilly asked for it to stay closed.

== See also ==
- List of films about horses
- List of films about horse racing
