= The Dead Zone (film) =

1983 film by David Cronenberg

- Theatrical release poster
- Directed by: David Cronenberg
- Screenplay by: Jeffrey Boam
- Based on: The Dead Zone by Stephen King
- Produced by: Debra Hill
- Starring: Christopher Walken; Brooke Adams; Tom Skerritt; Herbert Lom; Anthony Zerbe; Colleen Dewhurst; Martin Sheen
- Cinematography: Mark Irwin
- Edited by: Ronald Sanders
- Music by: Michael Kamen
- Production company: Dino De Laurentiis Company
- Distributed by: Paramount Pictures
- Release date: October 21, 1983
- Running time: 103 minutes
- Country: United States
- Language: English
- Budget: $7.1–10 million
- Box office: $20.8 million (US/Canada) $16.3 million (worldwide rentals)

The Dead Zone is a 1983 American science fiction thriller film directed by David Cronenberg. The screenplay, by Jeffrey Boam, is based on the 1979 novel of the same title by Stephen King. The film stars Christopher Walken, Brooke Adams, Tom Skerritt, Herbert Lom, Martin Sheen, Anthony Zerbe, and Colleen Dewhurst. Walken plays a schoolteacher, Johnny Smith, who awakens from a coma to find that he has psychic powers. The film received positive reviews. The novel also inspired a television series of the same name in the early 2000s, starring Anthony Michael Hall, the pilot episode of which borrowed some ideas and changes used in the 1983 film.

In the novel, the phrase "dead zone" refers to the part of Johnny's brain that is irreparably damaged, resulting in his dormant psychic potential awakening. When some information in Johnny's visions is beyond his perception, he considers that information as existing "in the dead zone." In the film adaptation, the phrase "dead zone" is that part of his psychic vision that is missing—a blank area that he cannot see. This "dead zone" refers to an outcome that is not yet determined, meaning Johnny can change the future.

== Plot ==
After having a headache following a ride on a roller coaster in Castle Rock, Maine, schoolteacher Johnny Smith politely declines when his girlfriend Sarah asks if he wants to spend the night with her. As he drives home through stormy weather, he has a car accident that leaves him in a coma. Awakening under the care of neurologist Dr. Sam Weizak, Johnny learns that five years have passed, and Sarah is now a married mother.

Johnny discovers that he has gained the ability to psychically see aspects of people's lives (past, present, and future) through physical contact. As he touches a nurse's hand, he sees her daughter trapped in a fire. He also sees that Weizak's mother, long thought to have died during World War II, is still alive, and how a pushy reporter's sister committed suicide, hinting at abuse by his hand.

With physical therapy, Johnny relearns to walk but retains a limp and must use a cane. Sarah reestablishes contact with him, but she is torn between her love for him and her family. They eventually drift apart.

As news of his gift spreads, Sheriff George Bannerman from nearby Castle Rock asks Johnny for help with a series of murders. At first Johnny declines, but he eventually agrees to help. Through a vision at the crime scene, he discovers that deputy Frank Dodd is the killer. Before Bannerman can arrest him, Dodd commits suicide. Dodd's mother shoots Johnny, before being killed by Bannerman.

Johnny moves to a different town and lives a more isolated life as he grows physically weaker due to his psychic abilities. Despite Weizak's concerns, Johnny refuses further treatment. He tutors children, working from home. The wealthy Roger Stuart hires Johnny to tutor his son, Chris. Through Stuart, Johnny meets Greg Stillson, a superficially charismatic third-party candidate for the United States Senate, for whom Sarah and her husband, Walt, volunteer. Stuart warns Johnny that Stillson is dangerous.

Johnny receives a vision of Chris and two other boys drowning in a local pond during an ice hockey game. He implores Stuart to change his plans, but he refuses and fires Johnny. Chris, however, stays home and lives, while the two other boys drown. Johnny realizes that he has a "dead zone" in his visions, where the future is changeable.

At a political rally, Johnny shakes Stillson's hand and has a vision of Stillson as president ordering a pre-emptive nuclear strike. Johnny seeks out Weizak's advice, asking, for instance, if he would have killed Adolf Hitler if he had the chance, knowing beforehand the atrocities Hitler would commit. Weizak replies that he would have had no choice but to kill him. Johnny comes to the realization that in order to save countless lives, he must kill Stillson at any cost. Johnny leaves Sarah a letter, telling her that what he is about to do will cost him his life, but is a worthwhile sacrifice.

Sarah and her family attend a rally for Stillson. Johnny also sneaks in with a rifle; he shoots at Stillson but misses. In the ensuing commotion, Stillson grabs Sarah's baby and holds him as a human shield, which a photographer captures on film. Before Johnny can fire again, he is shot by Stillson's bodyguard. Johnny touches Stillson's hand and foresees that, after the photograph is published, Stillson's career ends in disgrace and he commits suicide, thus averting the nuclear attack. Johnny lies dying as Sarah embraces him and tells him that she loves him.

== Cast ==
- Christopher Walken as Johnny Smith
- Brooke Adams as Sarah Bracknell
- Tom Skerritt as Sheriff George Bannerman
- Herbert Lom as Dr. Sam Weizak
- Anthony Zerbe as Roger Stuart
- Colleen Dewhurst as Henrietta Dodd
- Nicholas Campbell as Deputy Frank Dodd
- Martin Sheen as Greg Stillson
- Sean Sullivan as Herb Smith
- Jackie Burroughs as Vera Smith
- Géza Kovács as Sonny
- Simon Craig as Chris Stuart
- Peter Dvorsky as Dardis
- Barry Flatman as Walt Bracknell
- Les Carlson as Brenner

== Production ==
=== Development ===
The Dead Zone was initially under production by Lorimar Film Entertainment

After King's novel The Dead Zone was released in 1979, Lorimar Film Entertainment began developing a film adaptation. Producer Carol Baum gave the book to screenwriter Jeffrey Boam and asked him to write a screenplay. "I saw it had great possibilities and agreed to do it," Boam said. He developed a script with director Stanley Donen, who left the project before the film had reached production at Lorimar. Boam completed his first draft for the film on the same day as Ronald Reagan's election as president.

Lorimar eventually closed its film division after a series of box-office failures, and soon after, producer Dino De Laurentiis bought the rights to The Dead Zone. He initially disliked Boam's screenplay and asked King to adapt his own novel. De Laurentiis then reportedly rejected King's script as "involved and convoluted"; however, David Cronenberg, who ultimately directed the film, said that he was the one who decided not to use the script, finding it "needlessly brutal". De Laurentiis commissioned another script from Andrzej Żuławski, but rejected it and returned to Boam. Cronenberg later questioned the quality of the script De Laurentiis read as it was initially written in Polish, translated to English, and then translated to Italian. The film was finally on track to be made when De Laurentiis hired producer Debra Hill to work with Cronenberg and Boam.

Cronenberg initially rejected De Laurentiis' offer to direct the film, but accepted the position after meeting Hill. Cronenberg received five scripts for the film, including one from King which he described as "the worst one by far". Although Cronenberg did not write Fast Company he was involved in the writing process and made edits during filming. The Dead Zone was his first film in which he did not have any involvement in writing the script. It was also his first film that did not have any Canadian content.

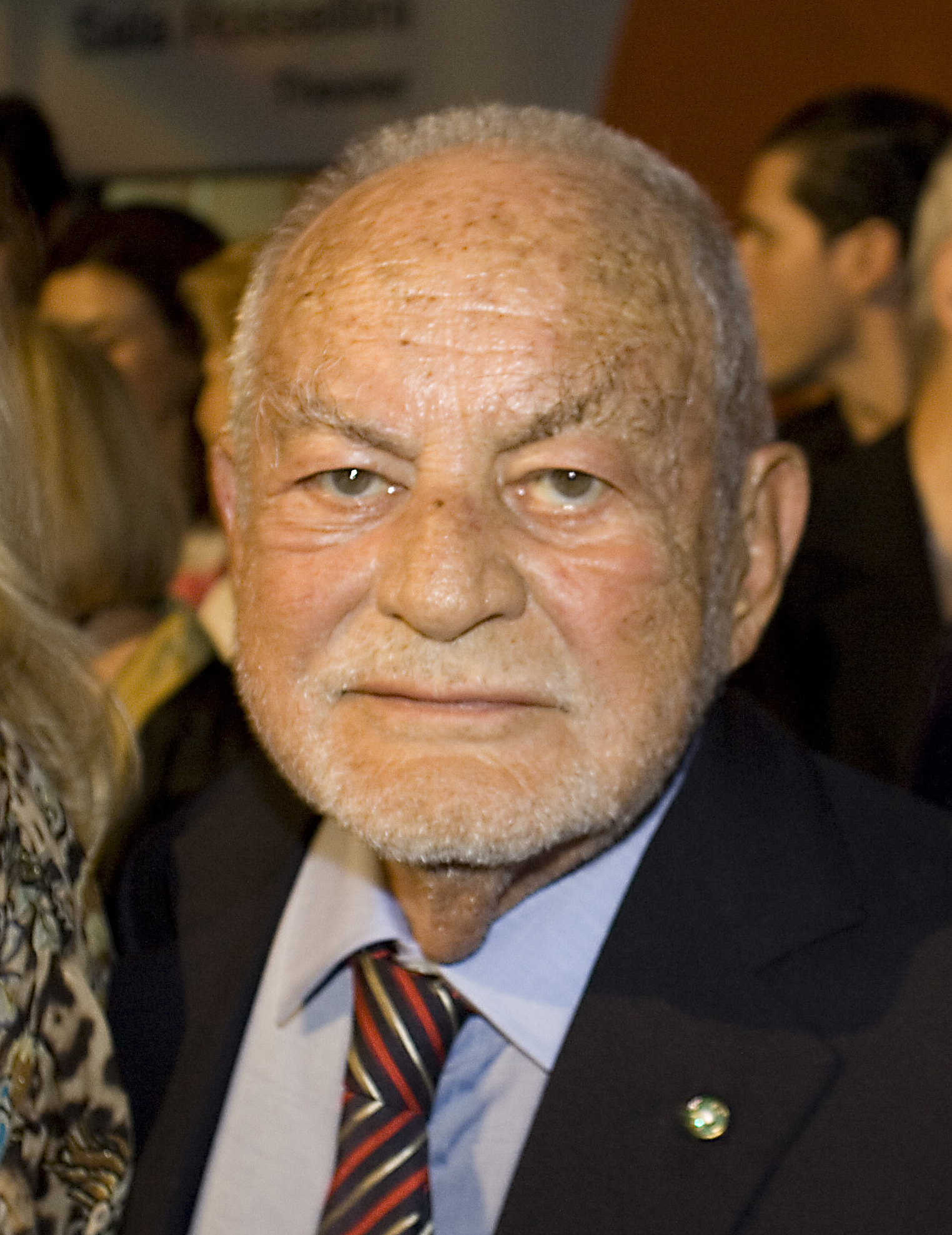
Film producer Dino De Laurentiis purchased the rights to The Dead Zone after Lorimar's failed attempt to produce the film.

Boam abandoned King's parallel story structure for The Dead Zone's screenplay, turning the plot into separate episodes. Boam told writer Tim Lucas in 1983, "King's book is longer than it needed to be. The novel sprawls and it's episodic. What I did was use that episodic quality, because I saw The Dead Zone as a triptych." His script was revised and condensed four times by Cronenberg, who eliminated large portions of the novel's story, including plot points about Johnny Smith having a brain tumor.

Cronenberg, Boam, and Hill had script meetings to revise the screenplay page by page. Boam's "triptych" in the screenplay surrounds three acts: the introduction of Johnny Smith before his car accident and after he awakes from a coma, a story about Smith assisting a sheriff in tracking down the Castle Rock Killer, and finally Johnny deciding to confront the politician Stillson. Boam said he enjoyed writing character development for Smith, having him struggle with the responsibility of his psychic abilities, and ultimately giving up his life for the greater good. "It was this theme that made me like the book, and I particularly enjoyed discovering it in what was essentially a genre piece, a work of exploitation," he said. In Boam's first draft of the screenplay, Johnny does not die at the end, but rather has a vision about the Castle Rock Killer, who is still alive and escaped from prison. Cronenberg insisted that this "trick ending" be revised. Boam submitted the final draft of the screenplay on November 8, 1982.

Boam stated that Donen wanted the film to be told from an outside point of view while Cronenberg wanted it from Johnny's perspective. King is reported to have told Cronenberg that the changes the director and Boam made to the story "improved and intensified the power of the narrative."

Before Christopher Walken was cast as Johnny Smith, Bill Murray was considered for the role as it was King's first choice. Cronenberg initially wanted Nicholas Campbell to portray Johnny, but the director wound up casting him as the Castle Rock Killer instead. Cronenberg also wanted Hal Holbrook to portray Sheriff Bannerman but De Laurentiis objected.

In addition to Donen, both John Badham and Michael Cimino were also considered to direct.

=== Filming ===
The financial failure of Videodrome occurred during the filming of The Dead Zone. Shooting started in early January 1983 and took place in the Greater Toronto Area and the Regional Municipality of Niagara of Cronenberg's native Ontario, Canada. The so-called Screaming Tunnel, located in nearby Niagara Falls, Ontario, was also used as the backdrop for the scene in which Johnny first helps Bannerman and Dodd. The gazebo was built by the film crew and donated to Niagara-on-the-Lake. It was Cronenberg's first film to utilize stereophonic sound.

According to a David Cronenberg interview on the DVD, The Dead Zone was filmed during a relentless deep freeze in southern Ontario, which lasted for weeks, creating an authentic atmosphere of subzero temperatures and icy, snow-packed terrain, which made for great natural shooting locations, despite it being almost too cold for cast and crew to tolerate at times. Canada's Wonderland, a theme park 30 km north of Toronto's city limits, was also used as a filming location.

=== Music ===
The music soundtrack, composed by Michael Kamen, was recorded by the National Philharmonic Orchestra, London, at the famous EMI Abbey Road Studios. Michael Kamen conducted the recording sessions; the orchestra was contracted and led by Sidney Sax. This is the only Cronenberg film since The Brood (1979) for which Howard Shore was not composer.

== Release ==
The film's premiere was planned for the Toronto International Film Festival, but three days before the showing Paramount removed it as the studio did not want negative reviews six weeks before the film's theatrical release. Daniel was premiered instead.

Cronenberg criticized the film's theatrical distribution and stated that it could have been number one at the box office had its distribution been better. The head of marketing at Paramount, David [sic] Rose, was arrested for embezzling money and Cronenberg theorized that Rose might have taken money meant for the marketing of the film. Stephen Rose was the Vice President of Global Marketing at the time, and later indicted by a federal grand jury in New York on charges of conspiring to evade federal income taxes and filing false income tax returns in 1983 and 1984.

Cronenberg showed his own Dolby stereo version of the film in Toronto for a month as none of the theaters were playing that version and broke even without concessions.

== Reception ==
=== Box office ===
The film grossed $20.8 million in the United States and Canada). Worldwide, it earned theatrical rentals of $16.3 million.

=== Critical reception ===
The Dead Zone received very positive reviews on release. It holds an approval rating of 89% on review aggregator website Rotten Tomatoes based on 54 reviews, with an average score of 7.7/10. The site's consensus reads, "The Dead Zone combines taut direction from David Cronenberg and a rich performance from Christopher Walken to create one of the strongest Stephen King adaptations." On Metacritic, the film has a score of 69 out of 100 based on 8 reviews, indicating "generally favorable reviews".

Roger Ebert of the Chicago Sun-Times gave the film three-and-a-half stars, describing The Dead Zone as by far the best of the half-a-dozen cinematic adaptations of King's novels to that date. He praised Cronenberg's direction for successfully weaving the supernatural into the everyday, and noted believable performances by the entire cast, especially Walken: "Walken does such a good job of portraying Johnny Smith, the man with the strange gift, that we forget this is science fiction or fantasy or whatever and just accept it as this guy's story." Janet Maslin of The New York Times referred to the film as "a well-acted drama more eerie than terrifying, more rooted in the occult than in sheer horror." Robin Wood stated that it was the first film by Cronenberg that he could admire and called it a "healthy development".

Dave Kehr of the Chicago Reader was more critical of the film, describing it as "By no means a bad film, just a disappointingly bland and superficial one ... in which director David Cronenberg relinquishes the one thing that had always set him apart from his Canadian colleagues: his willingness to follow his intuitions rather than the logic of a script."

== See also ==
- List of American films of 1983
- The Dead Zone (TV series), a television series also based on the novel
- "The Ned Zone", a segment of The Simpsons' "Treehouse of Horror XV" episode that parodies the novel and film
- "Ed Glosser, Trivial Psychic", a Saturday Night Live sketch featuring Christopher Walken that parodies the film

== Works cited ==
- Collings, Michael R. (August 30, 2008). The Films of Stephen King. Borgo Press. ISBN 978-0-89370-984-6.
- Cronenberg, David (2006). David Cronenberg: Interviews with Serge Grünberg. Plexus Publishing. ISBN 0-85965-376-5.
- Knelman, Martin (1987). Home Movies: Tales from the Canadian Film World. Key Porter Books. ISBN 1-55013-049-8.
- Rodley, Chris, ed. (1997). Cronenberg on Cronenberg. Faber and Faber. ISBN 0-571-19137-1.
