= The Man Who Knew Too Little =

1997 film by Jon Amiel

- Theatrical release poster
- Directed by: Jon Amiel
- Screenplay by: Robert Farrar; Howard Franklin
- Based on: Watch That Man by Robert Farrar
- Produced by: Arnon Milchan; Michael Nathanson; Mark Tarlov
- Starring: Bill Murray; Peter Gallagher; Joanne Whalley; Richard Wilson
- Cinematography: Robert M. Stevens
- Edited by: Pamela Power
- Music by: Christopher Young
- Production companies: Regency Enterprises; Polar Productions
- Distributed by: Warner Bros.
- Release dates: November 14, 1997 (United States); June 4, 1998 (Germany)
- Running time: 94 minutes
- Countries: Germany; United States
- Language: English
- Budget: $20 million
- Box office: $13.7 million

The Man Who Knew Too Little is a 1997 spy comedy film starring Bill Murray and directed by Jon Amiel. The screenplay was written by Robert Farrar and Howard Franklin, based on Farrar's 1997 novel Watch That Man. Upon release, the film received generally mixed reviews and was a box office bomb, grossing just $13.7 million against its $20 million budget.

== Plot ==
Wallace Ritchie flies from Des Moines, Iowa, to London, United Kingdom, to spend his birthday with his brother, James. James is not expecting the visit and is hosting a business dinner that night. To keep Wallace entertained, he sets him up with an interactive improv theatre business, the "Theatre of Life", which promises to treat the participant as a character in a crime drama. Before the night begins, James hands Wallace a pair of Ambassador cigars, promising to "fire them up" before midnight in celebration of Wallace's birthday. Wallace answers a phone call intended for a hitman at the same payphone that the Theatre of Life uses for its act.

The contact, Sir Roger Daggenhurst, mistakes Wallace for Spencer, the hitman he has hired, and Wallace assumes the identity. The real Spencer picks up the phone call meant for Wallace and murders one of the actors, prompting a police investigation. Daggenhurst, his assistant Hawkins, British Defense Minister Gilbert Embleton, and Russian intelligence agent Sergei plan to detonate an explosive device (hidden in a Matryoshka doll) during a dinner between British and Russian dignitaries, in order to rekindle the Cold War and replace their aging technology.

Still believing he's acting with the Theatre of Life, Wallace meets Lori, Embleton's call girl. Lori plans to blackmail Embleton for a substantial amount of money using letters that detail the plot; Spencer was hired to eliminate her and destroy the letters. Wallace scares off Embleton when he arrives to look for the letters and drives off Spencer. Fearing their plot will be revealed, Daggenhurst hires two more hitmen, while Sergei hires now-inactive spy Boris "The Butcher" Blavasky to eliminate "Spencer". Boris succeeds in killing the real Spencer, but Wallace and Lori return, retrieving the letters.

Using Spencer's communicator, Wallace mentions lighting up some, "big Ambassadors, at 11:59," referring to James' cigars. Thinking the words refer to the assassination plot, both sides believe he is an American spy who has caught on to their scheme. Daggenhurst offers Wallace and Lori three million British pounds in return for the letters, to be exchanged at the same hotel where the dinner is taking place; this is a ruse to capture and kill them both. All the while Wallace gets close to his "co-star" Lori, who admits she would love to study acting once they are paid.

Wallace contacts James and tells him to meet him at the hotel. Soon after, James sees an evening news report that Wallace has murdered an actor and the police are searching for him, prompting James to abandon the business dinner. Wallace and Lori are caught and held captive. Boris opts for torture by Dr. Ludmilla Kropotkin, but Wallace and Lori separate and escape before she arrives. James is captured and sent to be tortured by Dr. Kropotkin. Wallace evades the hitmen and finds himself part of a group of Russian folk dancers performing for the ambassadors. During the routine, he sees the Matryoshka doll bomb, unwittingly disarms it seconds before it goes off, blocks a poison dart from Boris with it, and steals the show with his improvised dancing.

Realizing their plot has failed when the bomb fails to go off, Sergei and Daggenhurst bring out two bags containing the promised £3 million for Wallace and Lori and release James, who is exhausted but otherwise fine after his torture session. Boris congratulates Wallace for his impressive covert skills and gives him a souvenir pistol, telling Wallace he will continue his butcher shop business. Sergei and Daggenhurst attempt to escape with half the money and discover Wallace's doll, which they believe is only a normal one he picked out for himself. They are proven wrong when they realign the doll, reactivating the bomb and blowing them up, just as Wallace and Lori share a kiss.

Some time later, on an exotic beach with Lori, Wallace unwittingly incapacitates a spy, passing a test by an unknown American espionage group. Believing he is capable of being a top agent, they offer him a position on "the team". Thinking that they wish to make him a theatrical star, Wallace accepts their offer.

== Cast ==
- Bill Murray as Wallace Ritchie
- Peter Gallagher as James Ritchie
- Joanne Whalley as Lori
- Alfred Molina as Boris "The Butcher" Blavasky
- Richard Wilson as Sir Roger Daggenhurst
- Geraldine James as Dr. Ludmilla Kropotkin
- John Standing as Gilbert Embleton
- Anna Chancellor as Barbara Ritchie
- Nicholas Woodeson as Sergei
- Simon Chandler as Hawkins
- John Thomson as Dimitri
- Terry O'Neill as Spencer
- Cliff Parisi as Uri
- Dexter Fletcher as Otto
- Eddie Marsan as Mugger
- Sheila Reid as SS Captain Woman

== Production ==
The story and script were derived from the novel Watch That Man by the film's co-writer Robert Farrar. Farrar got the idea from a chance remark at a dinner party. Farrar said, "Somebody told me about these strange live theater performances which were all the rage in England in the '80s. The idea was to telephone for instructions if you wanted to take part. My immediate reaction was, 'Wouldn't it be fabulous if somebody got the wrong number, and it all went hopelessly wrong?'"

Filming took place at a variety of London locations, including Three Mills Studios in London's East End and Elstree Film Studios.

== Release ==
Released to theaters nationally and internationally on November 14, 1997, The Man Who Knew Too Little was financed by Regency Enterprises and distributed by Warner Bros.

=== Box office ===
On its opening weekend, the film grossed $4.6 million and placed at the No. 5 spot, behind the films The Jackal, Starship Troopers, Disney's re-release of The Little Mermaid, and Bean. It ultimately grossed $13.7 million worldwide and was considered a box office bomb upon release.

== Reception ==
On review aggregator Rotten Tomatoes, the film has an approval rating of 37% based on reviews from 38 critics.

Lawrence Van Gelder of The New York Times called The Man Who Knew Too Little "another movie high on concept and low on execution." Gelder continued, "Yearning to combine the lunatic spirit of the Pink Panther, the panache of James Bond and the suspense of Hitchcock, this comedy turns out to be a one-joke movie executed in routine fashion [...] the plotting relies heavily on misinterpreted words, like ambassador (actually the cigars, not the envoys), port (the wine, not the harbor), gone (not dead but departed), that probably convey more humor on the page than on the screen." Van Gelder concluded, "Neither an inspired physical comedian nor the beneficiary of clever lines, genuinely inventive situations or intensifying suspense, Murray rides through the silliness of 'The Man Who Knew to Little' mainly on a funnyman reputation established 13 years ago in 'Ghostbusters'".

Michael Wilmington of the Chicago Tribune wrote, "'The Man Who Knew Too Little' is a movie where almost everything seems to go wrong, beginning with the title. An obvious takeoff on 'The Man Who Knew Too Much' – the name of the twice-filmed Alfred Hitchcock thriller (1934 and 1956) about an ordinary family plunged accidentally into international intrigue – the title is awkward, silly and unoriginal. Just like this movie. Despite a good cast and director (Jon Amiel of 'Sommersby' and TV's 'The Singing Detective')...the writers take a half-baked premise and clumsily retool it into a Murray vehicle. But they've cheated their star. Here, it isn't Murray who seems trapped where he doesn't belong, but the whole movie. Terminally unfunny, lazily unsuspenseful, uncertainly directed and full of good but stranded actors, [the film] isn't just a 'wrong man' comedy thriller. It's the wrong movie. For Murray and for us."

In 2010, Nathan Rabin of The A.V. Club reviewed the film and said that "it doesn’t aspire to do anything more than wring some cheap laughs out of a preposterous premise. In that respect, its success is directly equivalent to its extremely modest ambition."

== See also ==
- The Man Who Knew Too Much (1934 film)
- The Man Who Knew Too Much (1956 film)
