= Bedrooms and Hallways =

- UK theatrical release poster
- Directed by: Rose Troche
- Written by: Robert Farrar
- Produced by: Dorothy Berwn; Ceci Dempsey
- Starring: Kevin McKidd; Hugo Weaving; James Purefoy; Tom Hollander; Christopher Fulford; Julie Graham; Con O'Neill; Paul Higgins; Jennifer Ehle; Harriet Walter; Simon Callow
- Cinematography: Ashley Rowe
- Edited by: Chris Blunden
- Music by: Ian MacPherson; Alfredo D. Troche
- Distributed by: Alliance Films
- Release date: 1998
- Running time: 96 minutes
- Country: United Kingdom
- Language: English
- Budget: £3 million
- Box office: $136,049

Bedrooms and Hallways is a 1998 comedy-drama film about homosexuality. It was written by Robert Farrar and directed by Rose Troche, starring Kevin McKidd, James Purefoy, Tom Hollander, Julie Graham, Simon Callow, Jennifer Ehle, Con O'Neill, and Hugo Weaving.

== Plot ==
Leo, an openly gay man, celebrates his 30th birthday. Arriving home, he is very unhappy to find a surprise party organised by his roommates Darren and Angie in full swing. Leo has a complicated personal history with some of the guests and hides in his bedroom, feeling grumpy and old. This history is explained in an extended flashback.

Leo’s brother Adam had encouraged him to attend his weekly men's group run by New Age-type goofball Keith whose wife is Sybil. There, Leo meets hunky Irishman Brendan on whom he develops a crush, which he reluctantly reveals to the group. However, Brendan is straight and lives with his ex-girlfriend Sally, who is later revealed to be Leo's high school sweetheart. A series of 'Iron John' group exercises leads Brendan and Leo to develop a friendship. As they bond, Brendan begins to develop sexual curiosity about Leo. Another member of the men's group becomes jealous of their friendship, and Brendan fights with him over Leo. Brendan appears unexpectedly at Leo's door late one night and sleeps with him. They subsequently become something of a couple, to the consternation of one man in their men's group, though it encourages another, Terry, to explore his sexuality.

Meanwhile, flamboyant Darren has met estate agent Jeremy, who gets a kick out of having sex in houses for sale to which he has keys. However, he is not interested in "couply" things, despite Darren's attempts. Eventually they have sex with handcuffs and blindfolds in the bedroom of Sally’s house, during which she unexpectedly returns home. Jeremy abandons Darren, who dumps him. Leo gets close once more to Sally, and ends up kissing her. Feeling guilty, he leaves in a panic, and ends up telling Brendan what happened, who is furious as he still has feelings for Sally. Leo decides to confess to Sally that he is the one who is seeing Brendan (Sally had previously believed it was Leo's roommate Angie). He inadvertently does so while Brendan is there too, and leaves Brendan to face Sally.

Back at the surprise party, Brendan and Terry get into an argument over Leo, and Brendan punches Terry. Brendan asks him to go with him for a drink (the same tactic he had employed with Leo). Brendan starts dating Terry; Leo's brother Adam gets together with Angie; Jeremy and Darren make up; and Leo sleeps with Sally.

== Cast ==
- Kevin McKidd as Leo
- Julie Graham as Angie
- Simon Callow as Keith
- Con O'Neill as Terry
- Harriet Walter as Sybil
- Christopher Fulford as Adam
- James Purefoy as Brendan
- Jennifer Ehle as Sally
- Tom Hollander as Darren
- Hugo Weaving as Jeremy
- Paul Higgins as John

The film is notable for bringing together a number of actors on the cusp of breaking out into high-profile careers. McKidd became a leading man in films such as Topsy-Turvy, Anna Karenina (2000) on PBS, Nicholas Nickleby, De-Lovely, HBO's mini-series, Rome, and ABC's Grey's Anatomy. Purefoy, too, received starring roles in Mansfield Park (1999), Resident Evil (2002), Vanity Fair (2004) and as Marc Antony in Rome. Tom Hollander broke through in 2001 in Gosford Park, followed by nominated performances in Cambridge Spies, The Libertine, and Pride & Prejudice. He is probably best known, however, for portraying the villainous Cutler Beckett in Pirates of the Caribbean: Dead Man's Chest and Pirates of the Caribbean: At World's End.

Hugo Weaving had already become well known after his role in The Adventures of Priscilla, Queen of the Desert in 1994 and Babe in 1995 (as Rex the Sheepdog). The year after Bedrooms and Hallways debuted, he became even better known through significant roles in The Matrix film and The Lord of the Rings film trilogy, some of the top-grossing film series of all time.

== Reception ==
On review aggregator website Rotten Tomatoes the film has a score of 69% based on reviews from 13 critics, with an average rating of 6.3/10.

Marjorie Baumgarten of The Austin Chronicle awarded film with 3 stars out of 5, while Bob Graham of the San Francisco Chronicle gave it 3 out of 4.

== See also ==
- Queer Cinema
