= Jay Cronley =

American novelist

Jay Cronley (November 9, 1943 – February 26, 2017) was an American newspaper columnist for the Tulsa World and the author of many works of humorous fiction, including Fall Guy, Good Vibes, Quick Change, and Funny Farm. Cronley became a member of the Oklahoma Writers Hall of Fame in 2002.

Several of Cronley's novels have been made into feature films. Good Vibes was made into the 1989 comedy Let It Ride, which starred Richard Dreyfuss, David Johansen, Richard Edson, Jennifer Tilly, and Teri Garr. Quick Change was the source of two film adaptations, in 1985, and in 1990. The 1985 version, Hold-Up, was directed by Alexandre Arcady and was set in Montreal. The 1990 version starred Bill Murray, Geena Davis, and Randy Quaid; like the novel, it was set in New York City. George Roy Hill directed the 1988 adaptation of Funny Farm. The 2004 French film Nos amis les flics, directed by Bob Swaim, is based on Cheap Shot.

Cronley wrote about horse racing for ESPN.

== Literary reception ==
Kirkus Reviews called Walking Papers a "clever and entertaining caper" and "a little thin, but ingenious and occasionally even original."

== Death ==
Jay Cronley died from natural causes on February 26, 2017, at his home in Tulsa, Oklahoma.

== Novels ==
- Fall Guy (1977)
- Good Vibes (1979)
- Screwballs (1980)
- Quick Change (1981)
- Cheap Shot (1984)
- Funny Farm (1985)
- Walking Papers (1988)
- Shoot! (1997)
