= Funny Farm (novel) =

1985 novel by Jay Cronley

- First edition
- Author: Jay Cronley
- Language: English
- Genre: Comic novel
- Publisher: Atheneum Books
- Publication date: October 1, 1985
- Publication place: United States
- Pages: 248
- ISBN: 0689116098
- Preceded by: Cheap Shot
- Followed by: Walking Papers

Funny Farm is a comic novel written by Jay Cronley. It was published in 1985 by Atheneum Books.

In 1988, it was adapted into a film of the same name, starring Chevy Chase. It was Cronley's first novel to be adapted for an American film.
