= Empire of Sin (book) =

Book by Gary Krist

Empire of Sin: A Story of Sex, Jazz, Murder, and the Battle for Modern New Orleans
- First edition
- Author: Gary Krist
- Language: English
- Subject: History
- Genre: Non-fiction
- Published: 2014
- Publisher: Crown Publishing Group
- Publication place: USA
- Pages: 432
- ISBN: 0770437060

Empire of Sin: A Story of Sex, Jazz, Murder, and the Battle for Modern New Orleans is a 2014 non-fiction book by American author Gary Krist. The book is focused on the early 20th century in New Orleans, around the time that jazz became en vogue in the city. Much of the book is set in and around Storyville, New Orleans. A major figure detailed in the book is Thomas C. Anderson. The book was named one of the top ten books of 2014 by The Washington Post and Library Journal.
