= Rose Troche =

American film director

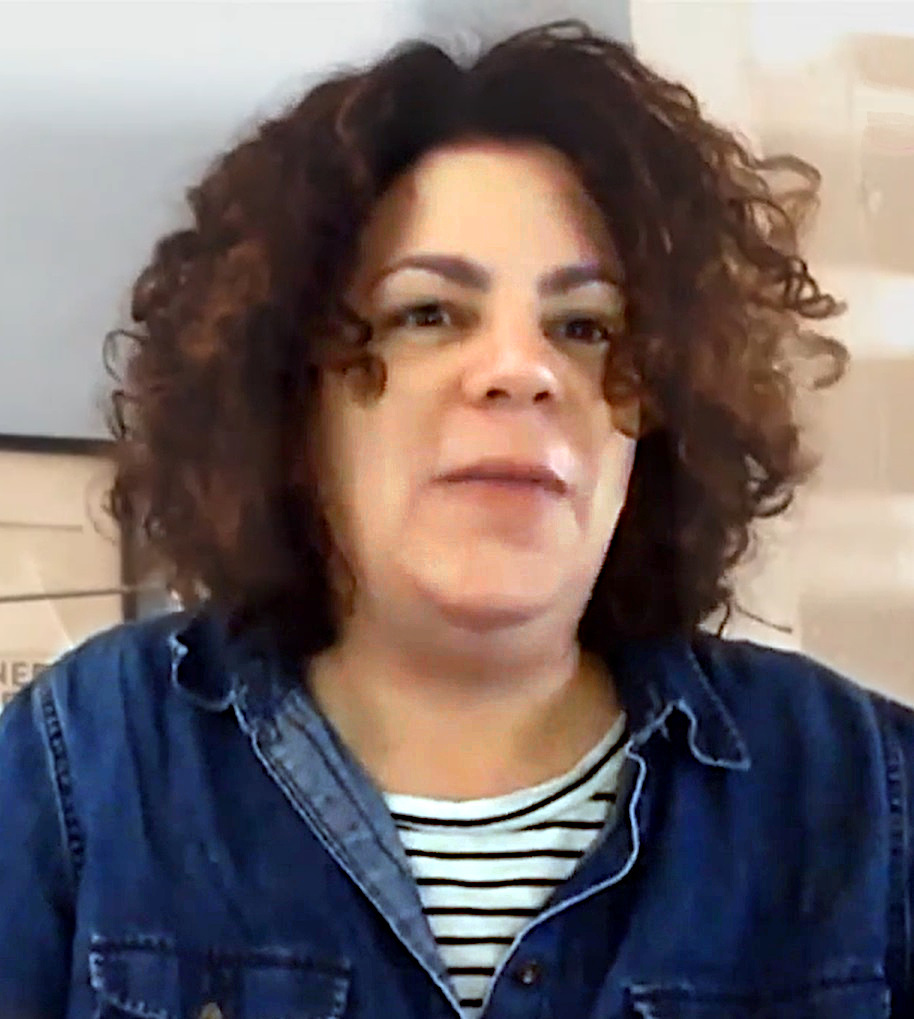
- Troche in 2016
- Born: 1964 (age 61–62); Chicago, Illinois, U.S.
- Occupations: Director, producer, screenwriter

Rose Troche (/troʊˈʃeɪ/; Spanish: [ˈtɾotʃe]; born 1964) is an American film and television director, television producer, and screenwriter.

== Early life and education ==
Troche was born to Puerto Rican parents and grew up on the north side of Chicago. In an interview she stated, "My parents thought moving to the suburbs was a sign of success," and "We were always the family that made everyone say, 'There goes the neighborhood.'" She and her family moved to the suburbs when she was a teen. She started working part-time at a movie theater where her interest in film developed. She earned her undergraduate degree in art history from the University of Illinois at Chicago and went on to get a graduate degree in film.

== Personal life ==
Troche is a lesbian. She met and started a relationship with Guinevere Turner in the early 1990s. They began to work on a film based on their own experiences and their friends in the Chicago lesbian community, which they originally titled "Ely and Max," but was changed to Go Fish. By 1993, Troche and Turner ended their relationship and Troche moved to New York where she wrote several scripts. Rose Troche says mixing business and romance on a lesbian film set can be a recipe for disaster. Turner and Troche detail how their breakup during the middle of Go Fish's production was not only difficult for them personally but also trying for their cast and crew, who felt compromised by the fighting couple's palpable tension on the set. Troche lived in London from 1997 to 1999, until she returned to the United States to direct The Safety of Objects (2001).

To make sure she would not forget the film's lesson, she had "remember that this life is short" tattooed on the inside of her left wrist, in Spanish, as she was writing the script.

== Career ==
Troche began her professional filmmaking career in the 1990s. Troche is just one of several lesbian directors who launched their careers with independent gay-themed films and have gone on to find work in Hollywood, where women make up just 12% of the Directors Guild of America membership.

=== Early career ===
While studying at the University of Illinois at Chicago, Troche made several short films while in school such as Let's Go Back to My Apartment and Have Sex (1990), This War Is Not Over (1991) and Gabriella series of short films in (1991–1993).

Rose Troche did three features before she went into television, Go Fish, Bedrooms and Hallways and The Safety of Objects. These three films were made over the course of ten years.

After completing The Safety of Objects, Troche realized that she had only directed so much content and wanted to work on her craft of directing. She wanted to work on projects that were immediate work not something that was going to take three years to make.

=== Films ===
Her directorial debut was the groundbreaking film Go Fish (1994), a lesbian love story. Made on a shoestring budget, it was one of the truly "independent" films of the mid 90s, and certainly one of the first in the lesbian genre. It premiered at the Sundance Film Festival in 1994. The film was co-written and co-produced with Guinevere Turner, who was Troche's girlfriend at the time. Her next feature film was Bedrooms and Hallways (1998) which explored sexuality.

She also directed The Safety of Objects (2001), which was adapted from the short stories of A. M. Homes and focused on heterosexual love in suburbia.

She was also a producer for both Go Fish and The Safety of Objects, as well as for Stacie Passon's 2013 film Concussion.

==== Go Fish ====
Rose Troche, a Latina director teamed up with her then partner and co-writer to finance on their own an experimental lesbian feature. It was the first film to be sold to a distributor during the Sundance Film Festival. With the small amount of approximately $8000, started their road to a Samuel Goldwyn $450,000 sale. Help along the way with Vachon's company Killer Films who contributed $5000 when funds ran out and John Pierson bankrolled the remaining $53,000. "Troche's Latina identity was (problematically) written out of the marketing campaign and the film was promoted on the basis of her gender and sexuality." The film was released during gay pride month in June 1994 and eventually grossed $2.4 million. Go Fish proved the marketability of lesbian issues for the film industry. Troche mentioned that during the filming of Go Fish (1994), at one point she didn't have money to pay her phone and electric bills. The film also put a label on her and critics considered her "a professional queer", a fact that she sometimes hated: "Go Fish made me such a card-carrying member. It is, like, boring. I go into interviews for Bedrooms and Hallways and all anyone can talk about is being gay, gay, gay." "If you're gay, and you sleep with someone of the opposite sex, does that make you straight?" Troche muses afterward. "I've done it, and I don't consider myself straight at all."

==== Bedrooms and Hallways ====
In 1997, Troche moved to London to direct the film Bedrooms and Hallways (1998) with British producer Dorothy Berwin and her partner Ceci Dempsey. The film was backed by a major studio so it was completed fast. It was a film that was exploring the romantic complications among a diverse group of gay, straight, and undecided characters. Troche said she wanted to make a film "that's genderless, without sexual identity and politics." The movie is a sex farce that tries to challenge conventional and rigid views on gender and sexual orientation. The film won the Audience Award at the 1998 London Film Festival.

==== The Safety of Objects ====
Troche returned to the United States, and to her previous supporter, Christine Vachon, and British financiers in order to direct The Safety of Objects (2001). The film was made from the short stories of A.M. Homes, who also co-wrote the screenplay with Troche. Troche used seven of the 11 stories in the collection, melding the suburban vignettes into one story. The ensemble cast with Glenn Close, Timothy Olyphant, Mary Kay Place, Patricia Clarke and Dermot Mulroney does an excellent job of delivering Troche's vision of one emotional arc to the seamlessly blended narratives.

=== Television ===
Troche's television work is just as extensive as her film work. She directed an episode of the HBO hit drama Six Feet Under. For three seasons, she has been a director and writer for the Showtime series The L Word, a show about lesbian friends living in Los Angeles. She has served as the associate producer for the series and was recently promoted to co-executive producer. She has also expanded her writing and directing credits, writing an episode for the series South of Nowhere and directing an episode of the series Touching Evil, as well as Ugly Betty and Law & Order. Troche got offered to do and episode of Six Feet Under (2001), and she enjoyed the beauty of being able to work with three cameras, it opened up her world to a different way of filming.

==== 2001 Six Feet Under episodic series – (2001-2005) ====
Season 2 Episode 3 was written by Kate Robin and was directed by Troche. In 2002, Six Feet Under won the Peabody Award and Rose Troche was one of the directors for one of the episodes.

==== 2004 The L Word (TV Show) – episodic series – various episodes ====
Troche was the co-executive producer and writer, of this popular series about a group of Los Angeles lesbians of which she has also directed several episodes. For Troche, casting for The L Word, "a lot of convincing" and some volleying of "you don't understand, but our audience will." Troche says her films are all connected to various stages in her life. Making a lesbian film was important to her when she was younger; she is very pleased with her current project, writing and directing the first lesbian series to screen on American television. The L Word discussed hot topics such as selecting a sperm donor, bringing out a "straight" girl, lesbian bed death, bisexuality, living in the closet and the number of degrees of separation between lesbian ex-lovers.

==== 2005 South of Nowhere (TV Show) ====
Troche was the consulting producer on five episodes.

== Themes ==
Troche believes that even if she eschews queer themes (which she did in The Safety of Objects), every film she makes is, philosophically, gay. "For example, I write my women like I like my women. They don't let people get away with anything. They're tough-talking," she says. "The truth is, everything I do is informed by being queer. My homosexuality doesn't go away just because, the characters aren't gay."

Troche seems to always have a character that relocates from the East Coast to the West Coast, and shows their struggle with Los Angeles. She also has a wide variety of multi-racial cast, which ties back to her life. She lived on the East Coast and was an outcast in her suburban community by being queer in a Puerto Rican community.

== Filmography ==
Film
Year	Title	Director	Writer	Producer	Notes
1990	Let's Go Back to My Apartment and Have Sex	Yes	Yes	No	short film
1991	This War is Not Over	Yes	Yes	No	short film
1991–1993	Gabriella	Yes	Yes	No	series of three short films
1994	Go Fish	Yes	Yes	Yes	feature film debut
1997	Pride Divide	No	No	No	documentary, appears as herself
1998	Bedrooms and Hallways	Yes	No	No	
2001	The Safety of Objects	Yes	Yes	co-producer	
2009	Chinatown Film Project	Yes	No	No	
2012	Xanadu	Yes	No	No	
2013	Concussion	No	No	Yes	
2019	30/30 Vision: 3 Decades of Strand Releasing (segment "R. Troche")	Yes	Yes	TBD	
2022	My Fake Boyfriend	Yes	No	No	

Television
Year	Title	Director	Writer	Producer	Notes
1990	Law & Order	Yes	No	No	
2001	Six Feet Under	Yes	No	No	Episode: "The Plan"
2004	Touching Evil	Yes	No	No	Episode: "Memorial"
2004	The L Word	Yes	Yes	Yes	Various episodes from season one and two
2005	South of Nowhere	Yes	No	consulting	
2006	Ugly Betty	Yes	No	No	
2010	Future States	Yes	Yes	No	
2012	Rochelle	Yes	No	No	
2012	Hunting Season	No	No	Yes	
2014	Finding Carter	Yes	No	No	
2015	Sugar	Yes	No	No	
2017	Star	Yes	No	No	
2018	Black Lightning	Yes	No	No	
2018	Vida	Yes	No	No	
2018	Sorry for Your Loss	Yes	No	No	
2018	All American	Yes	No	No	
2019	On Becoming a God in Central Florida	Yes	No	No	
2020-21	FBI: Most Wanted	Yes	No	No	
2020	Zoey's Extraordinary Playlist	Yes	No	No	
2021	FBI	Yes	No	No	
2022	Tom Swift	Yes	No	No	
2022	The Walking Dead	Yes	No	No	Episode: "Faith"
2023	Ginny & Georgia	Yes	No	No	2 episodes

== Awards ==
Year	Award	Category	Work	Result
1994	Berlin International Film Festival	Teddy	Go Fish	Won
1994	Deauville Film Festival	Audience Award	Go Fish	Won
1994	Deauville Film Festival	Critics Award	Go Fish	Nominated
1994	Gotham Awards	Open Palm Award	Go Fish	Won
1994	Paris Lesbian and Feminist Film Festival	Best Feature Film	Go Fish	Won
1994	Sundance Film Festival	Grand Jury Prize - Drama	Go Fish	Nominated
1998	London Film Festival	Audience Award	Bedrooms and Hallways	Won
1999	Verzaubert - International Gay & Lesbian Film Festival	Rosebud - Best Film	Bedrooms and Hallways	Nominated
2001	San Sebastián International Film Festival	Golden Seashell	The Safety of Objects	Nominated
2002	Deauville Film Festival	Critics Award	The Safety of Objects	Won
2002	Deauville Film Festival	Grand Special Prize	The Safety of Objects	Nominated
2004	Chlotrudis Awards	Best Adapted Screenplay	The Safety of Objects	Nominated
2004	San Francisco International Lesbian & Gay Film Festival	Frameline Award		Won
2014	Film Independent Spirit Awards	Best First Feature	Concussion (shared with Stacie Passon)	Nominated
2015	Outfest	Outfest Achievement Award		Won

== See also ==
- List of female film and television directors
- List of lesbian filmmakers
- List of LGBT-related films directed by women
- List of Puerto Ricans
