= Gary Krist (writer) =

American writer

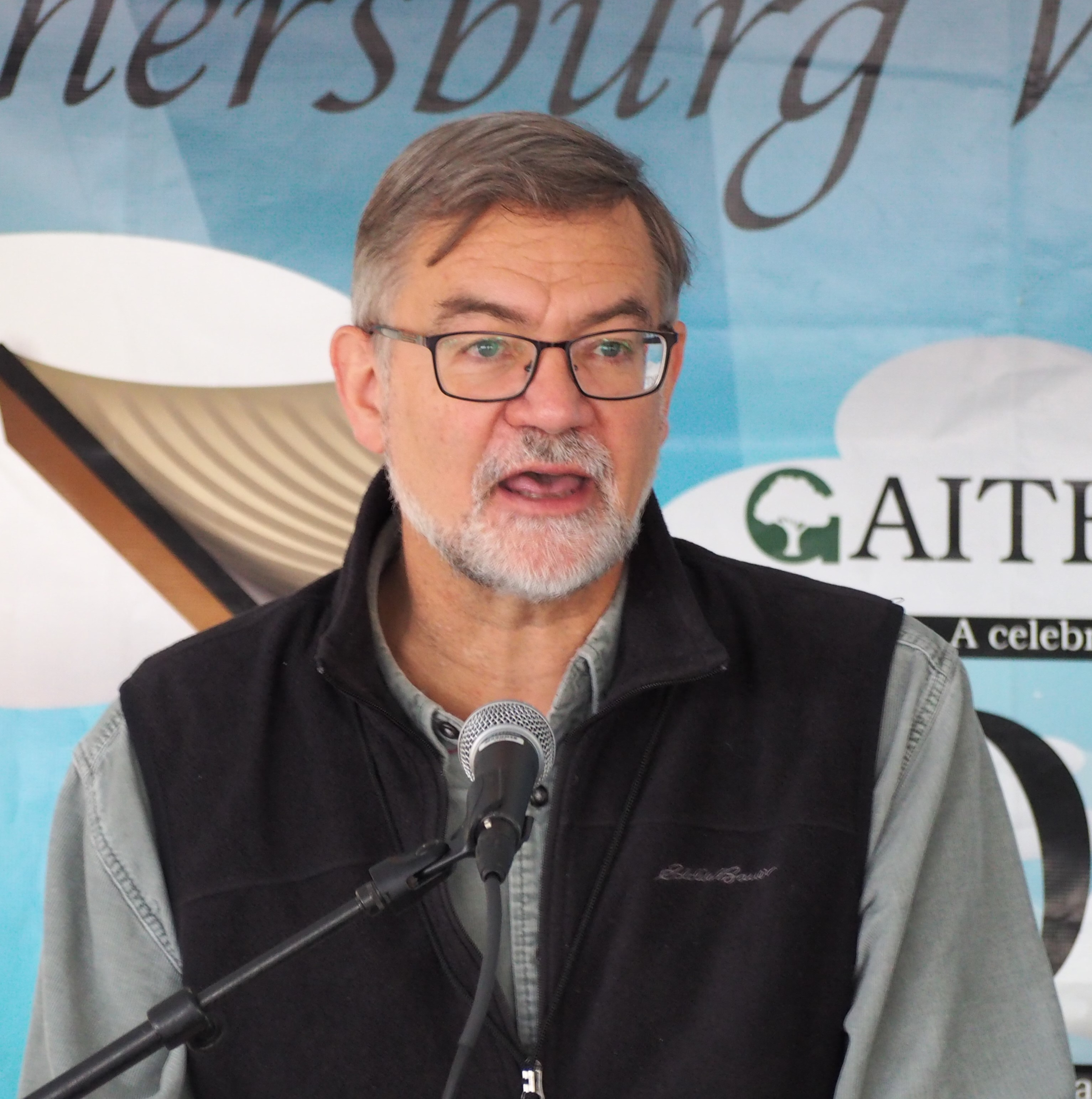
- Born: 1957 (age 68–69); Jersey City, New Jersey, U.S.
- Education: Princeton University
- Writing career
- Genres: Narrative nonfiction; novels; short stories
- Website: garykrist.com

Gary Michael Krist (born 1957) is an American writer of fiction, nonfiction, travel journalism, and literary criticism. Before turning to narrative nonfiction with The White Cascade (2007), a book about the 1910 Wellington avalanche, City of Scoundrels (2012), about Chicago's tragic summer of 1919, and Empire of Sin (2014), about the reform wars in turn-of-the-century New Orleans, Krist wrote three novels--Bad Chemistry (1998), Chaos Theory (2000), and Extravagance (2002). He has also written two short story collections--The Garden State (1988) and Bone by Bone (1994). His most recent books are The Mirage Factory: Illusion, Imagination, and the Invention of Los Angeles (2018) and Trespassers at the Golden Gate: A True Account of Love, Murder, and Madness in Gilded-Age San Francisco (2025).

== Career ==
He has been a frequent book reviewer for The New York Times Book Review, Salon, and The Washington Post Book World. His satire pieces have appeared in The New York Times, The Washington Post Outlook section, and Newsday, and his stories, articles, and travel pieces have been featured in National Geographic Traveler, The Wall Street Journal, GQ, Playboy, The New Republic, and Esquire, and on National Public Radio's Selected Shorts. His short stories have also been anthologized in such collections as Men Seeking Women, Writers' Harvest 2, and Best American Mystery Stories.

He has been the recipient of The Stephen Crane Award, the Sue Kaufman Prize from The American Academy of Arts and Letters, a Lowell Thomas Gold Medal for Travel Journalism, and a fellowship from the National Endowment for the Arts. "Empire of Sin" was named one of the top ten books of 2014 by The Washington Post and Library Journal. Krist has been awarded a 2020-2021 Public Scholar grant from the National Endowment for the Humanities to support the research for Trespassers at the Golden Gate, about the early history of San Francisco.

== Life ==
Born in Jersey City, New Jersey, Krist is a graduate of Princeton University. In 1979–80, he studied literature at the Universitaet Konstanz (Germany) on a Fulbright Scholarship. The author has been profiled in The New York Times Book Review (November 6, 1988) and the Style section of The Washington Post (February 25, 2007).

Krist and his wife live in Jersey City, New Jersey.

== Bibliography ==
Novels and story collections

- The Garden State New York : Vintage Books, 1988. ISBN 9780679725152, OCLC 19920702
- Bone by Bone New York Harcourt Brace, 1994. ISBN 9780151820641, OCLC 832166232
- Bad Chemistry New York: Random House, 1998. ISBN 9780679449317, OCLC 228438897
- Chaos Theory New York : Jove Books, 2001. ISBN 9780515130850, OCLC 46321399
- Extravagance New York : Broadway Books, 2002. ISBN 9780767913317, OCLC 53075282

Nonfiction

- The White Cascade: The Great Northern Railway Disaster and America's Deadliest Avalanche New York: Henry Holt and Company, 2007. ISBN 9780805083293, OCLC 150384796
- City of Scoundrels: The 12 Days of Disaster that Gave Birth to Modern Chicago New York: Broadway Books, 2012. ISBN 9780307454300, OCLC 801926578
- Empire of Sin: A Story of Sex, Jazz, Murder, and the Battle for Modern New Orleans New York: Broadway Books, 2014. OCLC 951367121
- The Mirage Factory: Illusion, Imagination, and the Invention of Los Angeles New York: Crown Publishers, 2018. ISBN 9780451496386, OCLC 1037895213
- Trespassers at the Golden Gate: A True Account of Love, Murder, and Madness in Gilded-Age San Francisco New York: Crown Publishers, 2025. ISBN 9780593444214, OCLC 1440669782
