= 1738 in literature =

This article contains information about the literary events and publications of 1738.

== Events ==
- April 11 – Robert Blair marries Isabella Law.
- July 10 – Richard Dawes is appointed Master of the Royal Grammar School, Newcastle.
- August – Laurence Sterne is ordained a priest, and in the autumn becomes vicar of Sutton-on-the-Forest, Yorkshire.
- August 8 – Jonathan Swift writes to Alexander Pope describing the deterioration in his mental condition; Swift will eventually be given into the care of a legal guardian.
- September 18 – Samuel Johnson composes his first solemn prayer (published 1785).

== New books ==
=== Prose ===
- James Anderson – The Constitutions of the Free-Masons, 2nd ed.
- Jean-Baptiste de Boyer, Marquis d'Argens – Jewish Letters (published anonymously)
- John Banks – Miscellaneous Works in Verse and Prose
- Alexander Gottlieb Baumgarten – De ordine in audiendis philosophicis per triennium academicum quaedam praefatus acroases proximae aestati destinatas indicit Alexander Gottlieb Baumgarten
- Louis de Beaufort – Dissertation sur l'incertitude des cinq prèmiers siècles de l'histoire romaine
- Thomas Carte - A General Account of the Necessary Materials for a History of England
- Robert Dodsley – The Art of Preaching
- Marie Huber – Lettres sur la religion essentielle à l'homme (Letters Concerning the Religion Essential to Man)
- David Hume (anonymously) – A Treatise of Human Nature (dated 1739)
- Pierre Louis Maupertuis – Sur la figure de la terre
- Margareta Momma – Samtal emellan Argi Skugga och en obekant Fruentimbers Skugga (Conversation between the Shadow of Argus and the Unfamiliar Shadow of a Female)
- Francis Moore – Travels into the Inland Parts of Africa
- Abbé Prévost – Memoirs of a Man of Quality (anonymous English translation)
- Thomas Shaw – Travels in Barbary and the Levant
- Jonathan Swift
  - The Beasts Confession to the Priest
  - A Complete Collection of Genteel and Ingenious Conversation
- William Warburton
  - The Divine Legation of Moses Demonstrated
  - A Vindication of the author of the Divine Legation of Moses
- George Whitefield – A Journal of a Voyage from London to Savannah in Georgia
- Diego de Torres Villarroel
  - Anatomía de todo lo visible e invisible
  - Vida ejemplar de la venerable madre Gregoria Francisca de Santa Teresa

=== Drama ===
- Robert Dodsley – Sir John Cockle at Court
- Carlo Goldoni
  - Momolo Cortesan
  - L'uomo di mondo
- Sir Hildebrand Jacob
  - The Happy Constancy
  - The Prodigal Reformed
  - The Trial of Conjugal Love
- George Lillo – Marina (adapted from Shakespeare's Pericles, Prince of Tyre)
- Charles Marsh – Amasis, King of Egypt
- James Miller –
  - Art and Nature
  - The Coffee House
- Alexis Piron – La Metromanie
- António José da Silva – Precipicio de Faetonte
- James Thomson – Agamemnon

=== Poetry ===
- Mark Akenside (anonymously) – A British Philippic
- Elizabeth Carter (anonymously) – Poems Upon Particular Occasions
- John Gay – Fables: Volume the Second
- Eugenio Gerardo Lobo – Obras poéticas líricas
- Samuel Johnson – London, A Poem, on the Third Satire of Juvenal
- Alexander Pope
  - The Sixth Epistle of the First Book of Horace Imitated
  - The First Epistle of the First Book of Horace Imitated
  - (with Jonathan Swift) An Imitation of the Sixth Satire of the Second Book of Horace
  - One Thousand Seven Hundred and Thirty Eight
  - The Universal Prayer
  - One Thousand Seven Hundred and Thirty Eight: Dialogue II
- James Thomson – The Works of Mr Thomson
- Diego de Torres Villarroel – Juguetes de Talia, entretenimiento del numen
- John Wesley – A Collection of Psalms and Hymns (first English edition)

== Births ==
- February 9 (baptized) – Mary Whateley, English poet and playwright (died 1825)
- May 9 – John Wolcot, English satirist and poet (died 1819)
- May 12 – Jonathan Boucher, English philologist (died 1804)
- May 27 – Moritz August von Thümmel, German humorist and satirical author (died 1817)
- June 21 – Gottlieb Christoph Harless, German bibliographer (died 1815)
- July 24 – Betje Wolff, Dutch novelist (died 1804)
- November 15 – Joseph Johnson, English publisher (died 1809)
- December 4 – Karl Friedrich Kretschmann, German poet, playwright and storyteller (died 1809)
- unknown date – Manuel Lassala, Spanish dramatist and philosopher (died 1806)

== Deaths ==
- January 6 – Jean-Baptiste Labat, French polymath (born 1663)
- March – Margrethe Lasson, Danish novelist (born 1659)
- April 25 – Giacomo Laderchi, Italian ecclesiastical historian (born c. 1678)
- June 5 – Isaac de Beausobre, French Protestant theologian (born 1659)
- July 8 – Jean-Pierre Nicéron, French lexicographer (born 1685)
- September 3 or 4 – George Lillo, English playwright (born 1691)
- September 23 – Herman Boerhaave, Dutch humanist writer (born 1668)
- November 10 – John Asgill, English pamphleteer (born 1659)
