= On Slide Inn Road =

Short story by Stephen King

- Short story by Stephen King
- Country: United States
- Language: English
- Genre: Horror short story

Publication
- Published in: Esquire
- Publisher: Hearst Communications
- Media type: Print, digital
- Publication date: 2020 (first publication)

Chronology
Rat	Red Screen

"On Slide Inn Road" is a short story by Stephen King, first published in the October/November 2020 issue of Esquire. It was collected in King's 2024 collection You Like It Darker.

== Plot summary ==
The Brown family–husband and wife Frank and Corinne, their children Billy and Mary, and Frank's Vietnam veteran father Donald ("Grandpop")–are driving to Derry, Maine, to visit Grandpop's sister, who is dying from cancer. The trip is being made in Grandpop's elderly Buick Estate station wagon. Grandpop has brought along various pieces of baseball memorabilia belonging to his sister (a former member of the Maine Black Bears who played shortstop in the Women's Baseball World Series) to show her, including her softball glove (with Dom DiMaggio's autograph), a Louisville Slugger with Ted Williams' autograph, and baseball cards.

The family have detoured down "Slide Inn Road", which Grandpop states is a shortcut to Highway 196. The road is initially asphalt, but eventually becomes dirt and then hardpan. Shortly after the family pass the remains of the eponymous Slide Inn - which burned down some time before - they reach a washout at the top of a hill, obliging Frank to reverse back down to the Slide Inn to turn the car around. Frank accidentally reverses into a ditch while attempting a three-point turn.

Billy and Mary walk to the remains of the Slide Inn, where a panel truck with a Delaware license plate is sitting with a flat tyre. As Billy looks into the flooded cellar hole, he sees a woman's leg protruding from the water. Billy and Mary are then confronted by two men, Galen Prentice and Pete Smith, who are implied to have murdered the woman. Billy attempts to lead the men to believe that he did not see the woman's leg.

After Galen and Pete help Frank push the Buick out of the ditch, Pete produces a .38 revolver and robs Frank and Grandpop of their wallets and Corinne of her purse. Grandpop, suspecting that Galen and Pete will go on to murder the family and steal the Buick, claims that he has $3,300 (equivalent to $4,105 in 2025) for his sister's funeral expenses in the trunk of the car. As Galen looks in the trunk, Grandpop hits him several times with the autographed baseball bat. Pete attempts to shoot Grandpop; Frank fails to react, but Billy seizes Pete's arm, enabling Grandpop to break his wrist with the bat and disarm him. Pete flees, while Galen is revealed to have died. The family retrieve the revolver and their possessions before leaving in the Buick to call the police.

== Publication ==
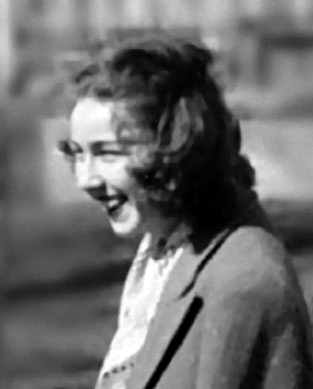
"On Slide Inn Road" was dedicated to Flannery O'Connor, whose 1953 story "A Good Man Is Hard to Find" inspired it.

"On Slide Inn Road" has been described as a "reimagin[ing]" of, and a "hat tip" to, the 1953 story "A Good Man Is Hard to Find" by Flannery O'Connor, to whom it was dedicated. Writing for Popzara, Trent McGee described it as "reimagin[ing] Flannery O'Conner's most famous story [...] by way of Raymond Carver, with a characteristically King-style conclusion that brings it all together." Michael Washburn suggests that the story "has an obvious debt not only to Flannery O'Connor's 'A Good Man Is Hard to Find,' which King acknowledges at the end, but to King's own 2012 story 'Batman and Robin Have an Altercation'."

On Slide Inn Road was first published in the October/November 2020 issue of Esquire. In 2024, "On Slide Inn Road" was collected in King's book You Like It Darker.

== Reception ==
Reviewing You Like It Darker for Bloody Disgusting, Jenn Adams described "On Slide Inn Road" as one of two stories featuring "unpleasant older men bonding with a younger generation – King's version of generational trauma." Adams suggested that "On Slide Inn Road" "harken[s] back to the unflinching horror of [King's] earlier career" and is "admittedly fascinating in [its] sheer nastiness and cruelty" but "lack[s] the emotional punch of the collection's longer tales". Bev Vincent stated that "On Slide Inn Road" "feels like one of King's early crime stories". Writing in The New York Times, Gabino Iglesias described "On Slide Inn Road" as "a master class in tension [...] full of King's dark humor." SFX described "On Slide Inn Road" as an "entertaining short sharp shock". Rob Merrill described "On Slide Inn Road" as featuring "horror tempered with heart".

Reflecting on King's own age at the time of writing, Brett Milam noted Grandpop as an example of "many of King's protagonists [being] purposefully old and retired", while Sassan Niasseri (writing for Rolling Stone) described the story as "a defense of old age". Brice Stratford (writing for The Spectator World) interpreted the stories in You Like It Darker as being a reflection on King's own life, with "On Slide Inn Road" being an "exploration of old age and mortality".

Mike Finn described "On Slide Inn Road" as "the story of a life-or-death moment that shows the different assessments of and reactions to threat, made by three generations in a family" and "a thriller centred on a tense, tightly written action scene, made three-dimensional by the vivid depiction of the family". Reviewing You Like It Darker, Michael Washburn judged "On Slide Inn Road" to be the strongest story in the collection, noting that "King uses deft touches to etch in the differences among the social media-savvy kids in the car, their white-collar parents, and the old-timer." Washburn interpreted "On Slide Inn Road" as intentionally drawing a contrast between "the banker who sternly observes progressive etiquette [who] proves a weakling and a coward" and "the old deplorable [who] shows what he is made of", suggesting, "'On Slide Inn Road' will not lead to invitations to cocktail parties or PEN America functions for King" and "it is by far one of the most perceptive things he's done in a long time." Similarly, Brice Stratford noted "...it is the problematic, repugnant old man who must risk himself to save his family, and the pompous, progressive son who fails when it really counts. King is not simplistic."

== See also ==
- "A Good Man Is Hard to Find"
- Stephen King short fiction bibliography
