= Two Talented Bastids =

Novella by Stephen King

- Author: Stephen King
- Language: English
- Genre: Speculative fiction
- Publisher: Scribner
- Publication date: May 21, 2024
- Publication place: United States
- Media type: Print (Hardcover)

Two Talented Bastids ("Two Talented Bastards") is a novella by Stephen King, first published in King's 2024 collection You Like It Darker.

== Plot summary ==
Mark Carmody has retired from his job as a school superintendent to care for his elderly father, the retired bestselling author Laird Carmody. Laird grew up in the small town of Harlow in Castle County, Maine, where he and his childhood friend David "Butch" LaVerdiere went on to work in a series of blue-collar jobs, purchasing the town dump in 1955. Throughout their lives, Laird dabbled in writing and Butch in art, but neither attained any significant success until their mid-forties, when both abruptly became highly successful in their respective fields. Butch died in 2019.

In 2021, freelance writer Ruth Crawford approaches Laird for an interview about the coincidence of both him and Butch suddenly becoming successful in their middle age. Laird initially refuses, but eventually agrees to answer three questions. When Ruth asks about the two men's success, Laird responds, "We were just two talented bastids." Before Laird dies during hip replacement surgery in 2023, he tells Mark that the true explanation for his success can be found in the locked bottom drawer of his desk. After Laird's funeral, Mark opens the drawer to find a folder of newspaper clippings about UFO sightings in Castle County and a notepad recounting a hunting trip made by Laird and Butch to the 30-Mile Wood in November 1978.

During the trip, Laird and Butch observe that wildlife has gone missing from the Wood. That night, they see nine circles of light moving in the sky. Two days later, the men find a young "woman" lying on a bridge near their cabin; they realize she is not human when, upon touching her, they find that her body has the consistency of Play-Doh. Realizing the woman is not breathing, the two men save her life when Butch delivers artificial respiration and Laird administers an EpiPen and oxygen mask. They return to the cabin with the woman; while discussing what to do, they are rendered unconscious by an unnaturally bright light.

When Laird and Butch awaken, the woman is gone and has been replaced by a young man. He explains that he is an alien collecting souvenirs of human civilization, which he claims will be gone within a century. As thanks for saving the woman, "Ylla", the young man gives them a small gray case, which he describes as "a way to use what you are not using", noting that "nothing can give you what isn't already there." After the young man leaves, Laird and Butch each blow on the case, which opens to emit a mint-scented air. The next day, Butch awakens and produces a high-quality drawing of the alien, while Laird awakens with the inspiration for a story. Leaving the case behind in the cabin, the two men return home and go on to success.

After reading the story, Mark visits the by-now abandoned cabin, on which Laird has paid property taxes in advance up to 2050. Finding the gray case, Mark recalls his daydreams of becoming a famous pianist. He blows on the case, but it does not open, suggesting that Mark - unlike Laird and Butch - does not have inherent untapped talent. He returns to his life, reflecting, "It's all right to want what you can't have. You learn to live with it. I tell myself that, and mostly I believe it."

== Relation to other works ==
The lakeside cabin belonging to Mike Noonan (the main character of King's 1998 work Bag of Bones) is noted as having been replaced with a housing development. The "Suicide Stairs" in Castle Rock, Maine (featured in the 2017 work Gwendy's Button Box by King and Richard Chizmar) are mentioned.

== Publication ==
Two Talented Bastids was published in 2024 as the opening tale of King's collection You Like It Darker.

== Reception ==
Emily Burnham (reviewing You Like It Darker for the Bangor Daily News) considered Two Talented Bastids to be the strongest story in the collection, stating that it "returns to time-honored themes in the author's vast body of work [but] never feels like it's rehashing well-worn tropes in the King oeuvre", adding that the story "unfolds in typically King-ian fashion — a mix of humor, poignancy and genuinely shocking moments". Gabino Iglesias (reviewing You Like It Darker for the New York Times) stated that Two Talented Bastids "opens the book brilliantly [...] its gradual slide into terror perfectly sets the tone for the entire collection". Mike Finn described Two Talented Bastids as "a Matryoshka Doll of a story", with three nested narratives. Brice Stratford (writing for The Spectator World) described the story as "King at his best — utterly invigorating, finding the magic in the humdrum." Similarly, Dana Brigandi of the James V. Brown Library described the story as "classic King at his best".

Bev Vincent described the story as "a fascinating take on the source of creative talent". Matthew Jackson (writing for Paste) described it as "a reflection on the mercurial nature of creativity and a depiction of the ways in which aging opens us up to new possibilities". Brett Milam described Two Talented Bastids as a "meta" story that "reflects another persistent King theme — the process around writing and creativity". Jenn Adams (writing for Bloody Disgusting) similarly described Two Talented Bastids as "King's most meta narrative to date", interpreting the main character of Laird Carmody as "a thinly veiled reference to King himself" and the story as being King "grappl[ing] with his own unparalleled success while confronting us with the horror of unfulfilled dreams". Brice Stratford also interpreted the story as being a reflection on King's own life, discussing "exploration of and anxiety around writing and talent". Eoghan O'Sullivan (writing for the Irish Examiner) suggested, "you might be mistaken for thinking you're reading King’s On Writing (A Memoir of the Craft)".

Justin Hamelin suggested that "the literary prose are strong in this one but the surreal aspects of the story come off rather flat, a very rare shortcoming on King's part".

== See also ==
- Stephen King short fiction bibliography
