= Duma Key =

Novel by Stephen King

- First edition cover
- Author: Stephen King
- Audio read by: John Slattery
- Language: English
- Genre: Psychological horror, Crime
- Publisher: Scribner
- Publication date: January 22, 2008
- Publication place: United States
- Media type: Print (hardcover)
- Pages: 611
- ISBN: 978-1-4165-5251-2

Duma Key is a horror novel by American writer Stephen King published on January 22, 2008, by Scribner. The book reached No. 1 on the New York Times Best Seller list. It is King's first novel to be set in Florida, as well as the first to be set in Minnesota. The dust jacket features holographic lettering.

== Plot ==
Edgar Freemantle, a wealthy Minnesotan building contractor, barely survives a severe worksite accident wherein his truck is crushed by a crane. Edgar loses his right arm while suffering severe head injuries impairing his speech, vision, and memory. During his long recovery, he experiences suicidal thoughts and violent, abusive mood swings, spurring his wife to file for divorce.

On the advice of his psychologist, Dr. Kamen, Edgar relocates southward and rents a beach house on the island of Duma Key, off the Florida coast. Kamen further advises Edgar to rekindle his onetime sketching hobby as a restorative. Edgar retains local college student Jack Cantori as a part-time personal assistant. Soon after, he meets and befriends the island's other full-time residents, octogenarian heiress Elizabeth Eastlake (sufferer of final-stage dementia, whose family trust owns most of the island) and her live-in attendant, Jerome Wireman, himself a once-gifted attorney whose wife and daughter's tragic deaths led him to (unsuccessfully) attempt suicide via gunshot wound.

Decades-old paranormal phenomena revisit Duma Key as Edgar delves obsessively into his art, lapsing into a semi-conscious haze; his artwork captures psychic visions, revealing his ex-wife's affair, his friend's suicidal depression and his younger daughter Ilse's fleeting marital engagement. Later, Edgar uses his newfound artistic powers to manipulate the outside world, healing Wireman's degenerating neurological condition and suffocating a child murderer in his jail cell. When Ilse visits the island, she and Edgar drive to a disused, overgrown area where colors seem unnaturally vivid, and Ilse becomes violently ill. Elizabeth warns Edgar that Duma Key "has never been a lucky place for daughters" and that his paintings must be sold to multiple geographically distant buyers, lest their otherworldly power grow too concentrated or dangerous.

Freemantle comes to learn that his beach house has hosted many successful artists, including Elizabeth, during its eighty-year existence. Edgar and Wireman manifest pronounced psychic talents while on or near the island, seemingly stemming from their debilitating brain injuries. Edgar's art becomes more vivid and distressing, featuring ship-and-seaside compositions whose vessel and mysterious, red-cloaked passenger draw nearer to shore in each successive painting. Elizabeth grows alternately lucid then incoherent as her dementia worsens, scattering her beloved china figurines, murmuring that, "The table is leaking", and repeatedly urging Wireman to throw one faceless figurine into her koi pond. In a moment of chilling clarity, Elizabeth asks Edgar if he has begun painting the ship yet.

After Edgar's paintings attract statewide acclaim, he hosts an art exhibition and accompanying lecture at an upscale Sarasota gallery, gaining a devoted audience (including Edgar's visiting loved ones) and yielding half a million in sales. Elizabeth makes a rare appearance at said exhibition; upon seeing his ship-and-seaside paintings, she reacts violently, making cryptic references and warnings, before suffering an incapacitating (and ultimately fatal) stroke. Edgar notices previously unseen details in his work: the ship's rotting sails, children toys littering its decks, screaming faces hiding in its foamy wake.

Narrative timelines interweave as Edgar's present-day ordeal parallels the tragedy which befell the Eastlake family in 1927. Young Elizabeth, suffering a head-wound in a horse carriage accident, turns to sketching as a means of recuperation. An outside presence—"Perse"—speaks to her, sometimes in her mind or sometimes through her rag-doll, filling her with knowledge, reality-altering powers and a gradual infiltration of sinister urges. Elizabeth directs her bootlegger father to a pile of ship debris in the shallows, unearthing a red-cloaked porcelain figurine. Her sketches grow progressively more malevolent, until, driven by fear, she rebels against Perse, provoking the entity's wrath. As an act of retaliation, Elizabeth's twin sisters are lured into the ocean to drown. Only her nursemaid, Melda, takes direct action; as Perse's drowned-sister things move beachward, the governess holds them off by means of silver jewelry, buying precious moments with her life while Elizabeth neutralizes the Perse statuette.

Edgar faces similar otherworldly dangers while unraveling the Eastlake mystery. He returns home to find "Where our sister?" childishly scrawled on an unused canvas. He then discovers that those in possession of his artworks either die or are possessed and driven into murderous deeds by Perse. He persuades his loved ones to discard their paintings, but a local art critic (whom Edgar forgot had also purchased one of his paintings) is possessed by Perse and bludgeons and drowns his beloved daughter Ilse.

As Edgar, Jack and Wireman race to discover the secret of Perse, the ghost ship's undead passengers return for them. Fighting their way to Duma Key's overgrown region—Heron's Roost, the original Eastlake manor—the trio locate the Perse-carving, sealed in a ceramic keg of whiskey (originally filled with water from the Eastlake pool - a location where young Elizabeth and Melda noted Perse’s powers were diminished). A crack had formed during the passage of years and thus "the table [whisky keg] was leaking" draining the water and allowing Perse’s powers to return. Knowing that submerging the Perse figurine in fresh water (As a young Elizabeth had done in 1927) neutralizes Perse’s powers, Edgar returns the figurine to a freshwater source (an emptied flashlight filled with drinking water ingeniously suggested by Jack). With Perse and her undead servants seemingly defeated, Edgar then returns to his beach house and faces down Perse's final temptation - a sand apparition wearing Ilse's face. He dispatches the Ilse doppelgänger by striking it with Melda’s silver bracelet, claiming a final victory over Perse.

Later it is revealed that Jack is attending Florida State University - his tuition paid in full by Edgar. Edgar and Jerome Wireman fly to Minnesota and drop the Perse statuette into Lake Phalen's freshwater depths, where it can forever sleep undisturbed.

Wireman makes plans to move to Mexico and start a hotel business, proposing that Edgar join him. However, he dies of a heart attack only two months later, before Edgar has a chance to see him again. Edgar laments not getting to see his friend again and that "we always think we have more time..." Then Edgar commences his final painting: a massive tropical storm, which becomes real and destroys Duma Key.

== Characters ==
Edgar Freemantle
The central character in the book, which focuses on his struggles. He eventually takes the lead in the climactic fight against Perse.
Jerome Wireman
A former lawyer from Omaha who moved down to Florida after losing his wife and daughter, surviving a suicide attempt, and being fired from his law firm.
Elizabeth Eastlake
A wealthy heiress and former art patron suffering from Alzheimer's disease, she plays a major role in the story's background and urges the protagonists to fight the evil force present on the island.
Pam Freemantle
Edgar's wife who divorces him at the beginning of the novel. The mother of Melinda and Ilse Freemantle. During the novel she has several affairs, but gradually reconciles with him until the events of the climax begin.
Ilse Freemantle
Edgar's younger daughter who remains the only person from his "other life" to stay close to him and who is the person he loves most in the world.
Jack Cantori
A local college student who serves as Edgar's chauffeur and handyman, keeping the house stocked with groceries and picking up whatever odds and ends he needs. It is his quick thinking that allows them to trap Perse at the end of the novel.
Nan Melda
Elizabeth Eastlake's nanny and housekeeper for the Eastlake family in the 1920s who discovered Elizabeth's powers with drawing and found out about Perse. Elizabeth confided in Nan Melda and they worked together to defeat Perse by Melda creating a distraction while Elizabeth submerged the Perse-statuette into a freshwater tank. Nan Melda was killed by Elizabeth's father after Perse tricked him into believing she was harming his children. Nan Melda's legacy helped Edgar and the others to discover Perse's weakness to silver and fresh water.
Perse
The evil force manifested on Duma Key, she first reached out through young Elizabeth Eastlake to get back to the surface from the ocean before being trapped in freshwater (she is left powerless by it), until the present day. She commands a ship of damned souls, and while not human is said to have something distinctly feminine about her, and she is manifest in an old china doll with a red cloak. She is again put back to sleep at the end of the novel though the characters fear she will eventually escape again. Her full name (Persephone), description and role in the book are all generally influenced by and taken from the Greek Goddess Persephone, the Queen of the Underworld.

=== Minor characters ===
There are a large number of minor characters in the book who have only passing significance to the main characters or to the plot of the book, including large numbers of friends and family from Edgar's "other life" as well as Wireman's family and boss, a number of characters with loose association to the two, and the various people who rent houses on Duma Key during the tourism season.

== Critical and popular reception ==
Critics mainly liked the book. King told USA Today that "a lot of today's reviewers grew up reading my fiction. Most of the old critics who panned anything I wrote are either dead or retired".

The New York Times critic Janet Maslin called the novel "frank and well grounded" and lauded the brevity and imagery of the novel, as well as the furious pace of the last third. Mark Rahner of the Seattle Times criticized King as a little unoriginal and longwinded, but praised the characters and the terror of the novel.

Richard Rayner in the Los Angeles Times called the novel a "beautiful, scary idea" with gritty down-to-earth characters. "[King] writes as always with energy and drive and a wit and grace for which critics often fail to give him credit [but] the creepy and largely interior terror of the first two-thirds of the story dissipates somewhat when demon sailors come clanking out of the ocean." The Boston Globe's Erica Noonan called the novel a "welcome return" to a similar style of some of King's better novels.

== Film ==
A film adaptation was in development but the project has stalled.

== See also ==
- "Memory", a related short story by King. King describes it as "the first chapter of Duma Key all kind of dressed up" in the Lilja's Library interview.
- Rattlesnakes, a novella in the 2024 book You Like It Darker by King, references Duma Key several times.
- Alan Wake, a 2010 video game with a similar premise to Duma Key. King's work is repeatedly referenced during the game.
