= Laurie (short story) =

Short story by Stephen King

- Short story by Stephen King
- Country: United States
- Language: English
- Genre: Horror short story

Publication
- Published in: StephenKing.com
- Media type: Digital, audiobook
- Publication date: 2018

"Laurie" is a short story by Stephen King, first published as a free download on his website on May 17, 2018. It was collected in King's 2024 book, You Like It Darker.

== Plot summary ==
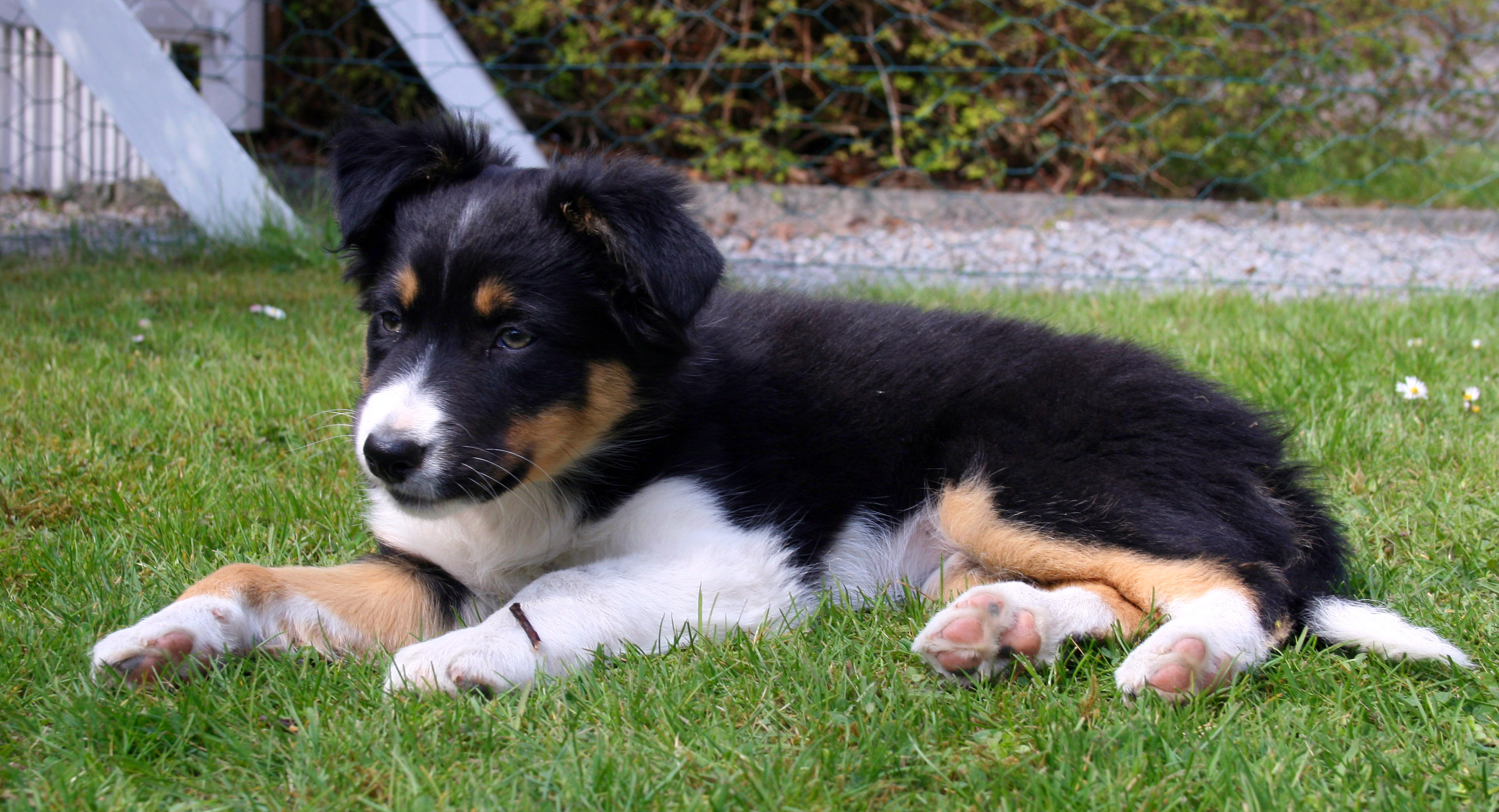
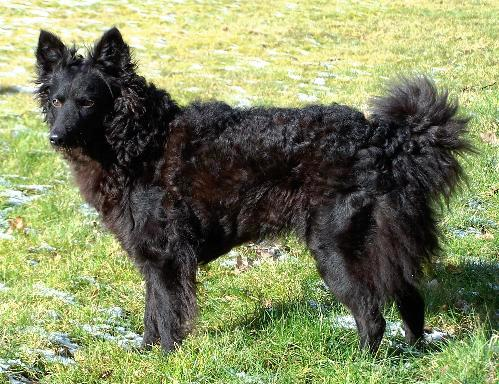
Laurie, the titular puppy, is a mix of a Border Collie (top) and a Mudi (bottom).

Lloyd Sunderland is a 65-year-old retiree living in the fictional island community of Caymen Key, Florida. (Note: The name is changed to Rattlesnake Key for the version in You Like It Darker) He has become depressed and lost weight after his wife Marian died from a glioblastoma six months prior. One September, Lloyd is visited by his older sister, Beth, who gifts him a Border Collie-Mudi puppy out of concern for his wellbeing. He is initially unwilling to accept the dog but ultimately agrees to look after her on a trial basis, naming her "Laurie".

Lloyd gradually bonds with Laurie as he looks after her, and in mid-October he tells Beth that he will keep her. He finds his physical and mental health improving, and begins eating more healthily and sleeping better. He also resumes working part-time as an accountant. Lloyd regularly takes Laurie for walks along "Six Mile Path", a boardwalk running alongside a canal.

On December 6, Lloyd's neighbor Evelyn Pitcher asks him if he has seen her husband, Don. While walking along Six Mile Path with Laurie, Lloyd finds Don's cane–cracked and dotted with blood–next to a section of the Path that has been overgrown with palmetto. After Laurie pulls free of Lloyd and runs under the palmetto, Lloyd follows and finds her confronting a ten foot long alligator which has killed and partially eaten Don. After Lloyd commands Laurie to go home, he is attacked by the alligator. When Lloyd hits the alligator with Don's cane, the boardwalk partially collapses, dumping the alligator into the canal and enabling Lloyd to escape with Laurie, who has waited for him on the other side of the palmetto. Lloyd calls the police, who notify Evelyn that Don has been killed.

Two days after the incident, Lloyd is visited by Gibson, a game warden with the Florida Fish and Wildlife Conservation Commission. Gibson informs Lloyd that the alligator has been captured and that it had been hidden alongside the boardwalk for several weeks, guarding a clutch of eggs. Lloyd speculates that Don provoked an attack by unintentionally hitting the alligator while swinging his cane. The story ends with Lloyd wondering what Laurie sees when she looks at his face and reflecting, "It was life, you were stuck with it, and all you could do was live it."

== Relation to other works ==
Lloyd Sunderland and Laurie make a cameo appearance in King's 2024 novella Rattlesnakes, attending the funeral of a resident of the Key.

== Publication ==
"Laurie" was first published on King's website on May 17, 2018, with no prior announcement. An audio recording was included on the audiobook version of Elevation, which was released later that year. A French translation was published by Éditions Albin Michel in 2019. In 2024, "Laurie" was collected in King's book You Like It Darker, with the first edition book cover referencing the plot of "Laurie". The story was dedicated to King's wife Tabitha's corgi Vixen, who died in spring 2018.

== Reception ==
Jenn Adams (writing for Bloody Disgusting) described "Laurie" as "a touching story". RTÉ also described "Laurie" as "touching", while stating that "it still bears [King's] unmistakable touch". Writing for The New Zealand Herald, Greg Fleming described "Laurie" as "an atypically sweet tale for King". Mike Finn suggested that "there's no high horror here but there is a solid story", describing "Laurie" as "another take on being old and alone and trying to give your life shape and purpose". Writing for Corriere della Sera, Stefano Ferri described "Laurie" as a "very strange story", suggesting "the plot has nothing to do with the dog but only with the owner". Justin Hamelin described "Laurie" as "rather forgettable".

Reviewing You Like It Darker for The Spectator World, Brice Stratford interpreted the collection as being a reflection on King's own life, with "Laurie" being an "exploration of old age and mortality". Similarly, Sassan Niasseri (writing for Rolling Stone) suggested that King saw himself in the main character of "Laurie", noting that King is also a dog-owner who has partially relocated to Florida in his old age.

In a 2025 article on "frightening critters" in King's works, Jenn Adams (writing for Bloody Disgusting) stated "one of [King's] most ferocious animals is also one of his most recent creations". Adams states, "with no ill intent or discernible malice, the alligator is a benign version of King's murderous monkey, a deadly monster waiting patiently in the shadows for an innocent victim to cross her path."

== See also ==
- Stephen King short fiction bibliography
