= The Fifth Step =

Short story by Stephen King

- Short story by Stephen King
- Country: United States
- Language: English
- Genre: Horror short story

Publication
- Published in: Harper's Magazine
- Publisher: Doubleday
- Media type: Print, digital
- Publication date: 2020 (first publication)

Chronology
Squad D	If It Bleeds

"The Fifth Step" is a short story by Stephen King, first published in the March 2020 issue of Harper's Magazine. It was collected in King's 2024 collection You Like It Darker.

== Plot summary ==
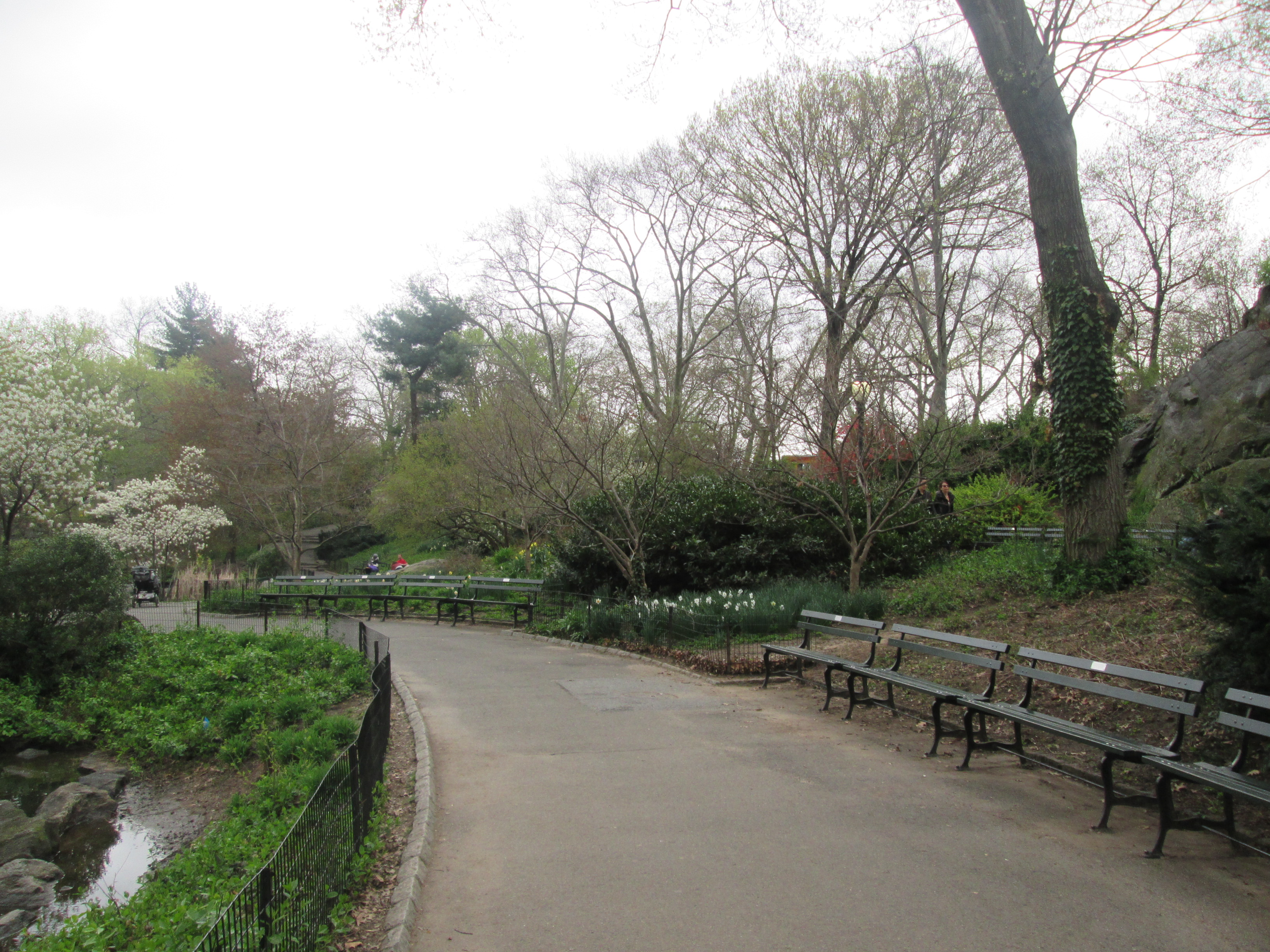
"The Fifth Step" takes place on a bench in Central Park.

Harold Jamieson is a 68-year old widower and retiree living in New York City. While reading the New York Times on a bench in Central Park one morning, he is approached by "Jack", an alcoholic salesman who is attempting to complete Alcoholics Anonymous' twelve-step program. Jack has reached step five - "admitted to God, to ourselves, and to another human being the exact nature of our wrongs" - and at the behest of his sponsor has approached Jamieson, a stranger, to ask him to listen to his admissions.

After Jamieson agrees to listen, Jack lists his various wrongdoings, which include fighting with another student in fourth grade for no reason, stealing alcohol from his mother, buying alcohol for a homeless man, cheating at Brown University, smuggling cocaine over the Canadian border, lying to his employer, and lying to his wife. Jamieson becomes uneasy after Jack describes having wanted to beat his wife after she argues with him about his drinking.

As Jack prepares to leave, he confesses to Jamieson that he murdered his wife, and then stabs Jamieson between the ribs with an ice pick. As Jack leaves Jamieson–seemingly dying–on the bench, he admits that he enjoys killing people, describing it as "the chief of my wrongs", then leaves Jamieson with the words "You'll be in my prayers tonight".

== Publication ==
"The Fifth Step" was originally published in the March 2020 issue of Harper's Magazine. In 2021, "The Fifth Step" was included in the anthology Best Crime Stories of the Year edited by Lee Child. In 2024, "The Fifth Step" was collected in King's book You Like It Darker.

== Reception ==
Writing for USA Today, Brian Truitt described "The Fifth Step" as having "one heck of a slowburn reveal", while SFX described "The Fifth Step" as an "entertaining short sharp shock" and Eric Eisenberg of CinemaBlend described it as "an effective quick-bite horror story [...] with a sharp twist at the end". Justin Hamelin called "The Fifth Step" "a nasty little yarn that made me gasp aloud". Writing in The New York Times, Gabino Iglesias described "The Fifth Step" as "a literary shanking — it's fast and violent in equal measure." Reviewing You Like it Darker, Rob Merrill described "The Fifth Step" as the "darkest" story in the collection, stating "in just 10 pages [it] should scare anyone who's been paying attention to the true crime stories splashed across the screens of this country's tawdrier news sources." Describing the story as "Twilight Zone-type", Mike Finn noted "how clearly, after a few deft paragraphs, I could see Harold Jamieson". "The Fifth Step" was mentioned among "other distinguished stories of 2020" in The Best American Short Stories 2021, edited by Heidi Pitlor and Jesmyn Ward. Amanda Mullen (writing for Screen Rant) stated "although 'The Fifth Step' is one of the shorter tales in You Like It Darker, its ending makes it one of the most disturbing", comparing it to King's 1977 work "The Man Who Loved Flowers".

A mixed review was received from the website EverythingStephenKing.com, which described "The Fifth Step" as "a nice story, well told" - noting "King's ability to create believable characters and situations has not diminished over the years" - but also as "forgettable", with a predictable ending. Reviewing You Like It Darker for Bloody Disgusting, Jenn Adams suggested that "The Fifth Step" would "likely prove terrifying to those in Alcoholics Anonymous" but "feel[s] slight and may not evoke the same powerful response in readers without similar life experiences." Also reviewing You Like It Darker, Brett Milam judged "The Fifth Step" to be the weakest of the 12 stories in the collection.

Reviewing You Like It Darker for The Spectator World, Brice Stratford interpreted the collection as being a reflection on King's own life, with "the addict cataloging his life’s strengths and failings" in "The Fifth Step" referencing King's own substance abuse issues.

Sassan Niasseri (writing for Rolling Stone) noted that "The Fifth Step" is a rare example of a story by King with a twist ending.

== See also ==
- Stephen King short fiction bibliography
