= A Contention for Honor and Riches =

1630s play by James Shirley

A Contention for Honor and Riches is a Caroline era stage play, a short drama or interlude written by James Shirley and first published in 1633. Generally classed as a morality play, it illustrates the continuing influence of archaic forms of drama on the relatively "sophisticated" or even "decadent" theatre of the Caroline era.

The play was entered into Register on November 9, 1632 and was published the following year in quarto by the bookseller William Cooke, who issued many of Shirley's plays in the 1630s, either alone or in partnership with Andrew Crooke. Shirley dedicated the volume to Edward Golding, of Colston, Northamptonshire, a personal friend. No data on the play's theatrical history has survived; it is not known when, or even if, the work was ever staged. The most likely date for the play's authorship may be 1630. The existing play, "A moral masque in three scenes," was later reworked and expanded by the author into a full five-act drama, and eventually published in 1659 under the title Honoria and Mammon.

1630 was relatively late in the history of English Renaissance theatre for a morality play — though the form, while unfashionable, was not entirely extinct in Shirley's era. Late examples include Four Plays in One (c. 1608–13), from the canon of John Fletcher, and The Sun's Darling (1624), a collaboration between Thomas Dekker and John Ford. As is often the case in the morality form, the characters in Shirley's Contention are known by generic titles more than personal names: Lady Honor, Lady Riches, Ingenuity, Gettings, the Courtier, the Soldier, the Vice, etc. (In the later expansion, Honoria and Mammon, the same characters are given personal names.)

== Synopsis ==
At the start of the play, Ingenuity, a scholar, pays court to the Lady Riches, but the two quarrel. The Lady's other suitors, Gettings and Clod (Clod represents country gentlemen, while Gettings represents the London merchant class), also quarrel — not with their Lady but with each other. The outcome of their dispute is that Clod challenges Gettings to a duel. Lady Honor also has her suitors — in her case, the Courtier and Soldier ply their suits to her while Ingenuity watches. After Honor and Ingenuity have left them alone, the Courtier and Soldier also argue, and are about to fight, when their nemeses Honesty and No-Pay enter and scare them off.

Next, Gettings and Clod are shown on the "field of honor," about to start their duel. But they too are interrupted: Long Vacation and Foul-Weather-in-Harvest enter, and the two suitor/duellists reconcile because of their fear of these figures. (Long Vacation refers to the period at the end of the legal year in August and September, when business in the City of London is slack.) Lady Riches shows up, and accepts Gettings as her intended husband — but grants a reversion of the office of husband to Clod. The Soldier and Courtier also turn up, searching for Honor — but they are distracted by the presence of Riches. Finally Honor and Ingenuity arrive to complete the cast: everyone else is surprised to learn that Ingenuity and Honor are now married — though the news prompts a general reconciliation among all the members of the group.
