= You Like It Darker =

2024 collection of stories by Stephen King

- First edition cover
- Author: Stephen King
- Audio read by: Will Patton; Stephen King
- Language: English
- Genre: Horror
- Publisher: Scribner
- Publication date: May 21, 2024
- Publication place: United States
- Media type: Print (hardcover), e-book, audiobook
- Pages: 502
- ISBN: 978-1668037713
- Preceded by: If It Bleeds

You Like It Darker is a collection of twelve stories by American author Stephen King, published by Scribner in May 2024. The book was announced on November 6, 2023, via Entertainment Weekly, which provided a look at the book's wraparound cover, table of contents, and an excerpt from "Rattlesnakes", a sequel to King's 1981 novel Cujo.

== Stories ==
#	Title	Originally published in	Type
1	Two Talented Bastids	Previously unpublished	Novella
2	"The Fifth Step"	March 2020 issue of Harper's Magazine	Short story
3	"Willie the Weirdo"	McSweeney's 66 (Spring 2022) (Note: Originally published in French in Bifrost #104 (October 2021))	Short story
4	Danny Coughlin's Bad Dream	Previously unpublished	Novella
5	"Finn"	Finn e-book (2022)	Short story
6	"On Slide Inn Road"	October/November 2020 issue of Esquire	Short story
7	"Red Screen"	Red Screen e-book (2021)	Short story
8	"The Turbulence Expert"	Flight or Fright (2018)	Short story
9	"Laurie"	stephenking.com (2018)	Short story
10	Rattlesnakes	Previously unpublished	Novella
11	The Dreamers	Previously unpublished	Novella
12	The Answer Man	Previously unpublished	Novella

== Selected stories ==
Notable stories (the novellas) in the collection include:

=== Two Talented Bastids ===
This story unravels a concealed secret that's shared regarding the otherworldly genesis of the artistic abilities and the remarkable careers of childhood friends from a small Maine town: painter David "Butch" LaVerdiere and author Laird Carmody.

=== Danny Coughlin's Bad Dream ===
Focusing on the impact of a sudden and unprecedented psychic event, this tale explores the profound upheaval caused in numerous lives.

=== Finn ===
A young Irish man experiences frequent injuries and bad luck while growing up. His grandmother tells him that God will give him two bits of good luck for every bit of bad. At 19, while running home from his girlfriend's house, he is mistaken for another young man, abducted and tortured for information he does not have. When his kidnappers realize their mistake they release him, giving him four thousand euros for his trouble. Walking home, he remembers Ambrose Bierce's "An Occurrence at Owl Creek Bridge" and wonders whether he is only imagining his emancipation while actually dying under torture.

=== Rattlesnakes ===
A sequel to King's 1981 novel Cujo, this tale follows grieving widower Vic Trenton's search for solace after the death of his beloved wife Donna. In Florida his journey takes an unexpected twist when he meets a new neighbor who lost her twin sons to a snake attack. The neighbor dies, unexpectedly leaving all her assets to Trenton and this makes the police suspicious of him. Supernatural forces appear, threatening Trenton and his sanity.

=== The Dreamers ===
A narrative centered on a reticent Vietnam veteran who, upon responding to a job advertisement, discovers that certain realms of the universe are better left undiscovered. Stephen King said that though it is very rare that he scares himself with what he writes, a story in the upcoming collection titled The Dreamers was "so creepy" that he "couldn't think about it at night".

=== The Answer Man ===
This story probes the dual nature of prescience, contemplating whether it constitutes good fortune or a curse, and reflects on how lives marked by profound tragedy can still hold significance.

== Publication ==
The collection was published on May 21, 2024, by Scribner. It is available in physical, digital and audio book formats.

In July 2024, King noted that his 2016 short story "The Music Room" had been omitted from the collection due to him forgetting about it, but that it would "probably" be included in the paperback edition. It was included after the Afterword in the paperback edition.

== Critical response ==
The book debuted at number one on The New York Times fiction best-seller list for the week ending May 25, 2024.

In his USA Today review, Brian Truitt commends Stephen King's You Like It Darker for its array of twelve dark and engaging stories. The collection is praised for revisiting familiar characters and settings while exploring new horrors, such as deadly snakes, ghosts, and mad scientists. Truitt highlights King's ability to blend horror with deeper themes of talent, unrealized dreams, and existential musings. Despite some less impactful stories, the collection is noted for its gripping narrative and ability to evoke fear.

Kirkus Reviews points out that while some stories might feel less developed, the overall collection remains engaging. The review appreciates the familiar "King staples" and notes that the stories successfully revisit old haunts and characters, providing a mix of suspense and horror.

== See also ==
- Stephen King short fiction bibliography
- Unpublished and uncollected works by Stephen King
