= The Turbulence Expert =

Short story by Stephen King

- Short story by Stephen King
- Country: United States
- Language: English
- Genre: Horror/science fiction short story

Publication
- Published in: Flight or Fright
- Publisher: Cemetery Dance Publications
- Media type: Print, audiobook
- Publication date: 2018

Chronology
Elevation	Squad D

"The Turbulence Expert" is a short story by Stephen King, first published in the 2018 horror anthology Flight or Fright. It was collected in King's 2024 collection You Like It Darker.

== Plot summary ==
While eating dinner in Boston, Craig Dixon, a "turbulence expert," receives a phone call from his "facilitator", who instructs him to board a flight to Sarasota later that evening. Dixon reluctantly agrees; he considers running but is convinced his employer will catch him and potentially execute him. On the flight, Dixon is seated between Mary Worth, an elderly widowed librarian, and Frank Freeman, a gruff businessman. Dixon experiences severe apprehension about the flight. He reflects on his lifestyle, which includes a high salary and living in high-class hotels.

As the plane passes over South Carolina, it encounters a severe patch of clear-air turbulence. Dixon closes his eyes and experiences a vivid vision of the plane crashing, after which the plane rights itself. Worth tells Dixon that she was sure the plane was going to crash, saying, "I saw it."

In Sarasota, Dixon is met by a stretch limousine that will take him to a hotel. After seeing Worth standing on the curb, he offers her a lift to Siesta Key. During the journey, Dixon explains that he works for an unnamed organization that is capable of predicting clear-air turbulence, which is a far more serious phenomenon than the public believes. "Talented" individuals such as Dixon are required on flights that will encounter clear-air turbulence, with their terror triggering telepathic abilities that prevent the plane from crashing.

Remembering that Worth was also terrified and also believed the plane would crash, Dixon invites her to join the organization, privately noting that once she joins she will never be able to leave and that recruiting her will enable him to retire two years earlier. The story ends with Worth being contacted by Dixon's facilitator, after which she is seen acting as a turbulence expert on a flight from Boston to Dallas.

== Publication ==
Bev Vincent suggests that the central idea behind "The Turbulence Expert" can be traced to an interview King gave to Dennis Miller in 1998, where he disclosed a fear of flying and stated "the flight you have to be afraid of is the flight where there's nobody on who's afraid of flying [...] those are the flights that crash" and that "you have three or four people who are terrified right out of their minds... we hold it up."

"The Turbulence Expert" was first published in 2018 as part of the 2018 horror anthology Flight or Fright, which was conceived of by King and edited by him along with Bev Vincent. An audiobook was released consecutively by Simon & Schuster Audio, with King narrating his own story. In 2024, "The Turbulence Expert" was collected in King's book You Like It Darker.

== Reception ==
Stephen Spignesi noted that "The Turbulence Expert" represents one of King's occasional forays into science fiction, commenting "he doesn't 'let us down' (pun intended) with his latest effort." Greg Chapman of the New York Journal of Books stated "like many of King’s short stories, it leaves you guessing—and wanting more". Reviewing Flight or Fright, Publishers Weekly described "The Turbulence Expert" as "a perfectly tense tale".

Less positive reviews were received from Ross Jeffery of STORGY Magazine, who described "The Turbulence Expert" as "a good story [...] not a great story" and "a simple story that really didn't move me at all", and from SFX, which described "The Turbulence Expert" as "half-formed". Reviewing You Like It Darker for Bloody Disgusting, Jenn Adams suggested that "The Turbulence Expert" would "play on existing fears of airline travel" but "feel[s] slight and may not evoke the same powerful response in readers without similar life experiences." Critiquing elements of the plot, Michael Washburn suggested that "King's concept here is interesting, but he might have thought it through with more rigor [...] and set [it] aside if he could not resolve its contradictions". Describing the story as "Twilight Zone-style", Mike Finn suggested that "the central conceit of the story was original and fun. The story was briskly told and felt a little sparse". Reviewing You Like It Darker for Rolling Stone, Sassan Niasseri judged "The Turbulence Expert" to be the weakest story in the collection.

Reviewing You Like It Darker, Justin Hamelin suggested that "'The Turbulence Expert' and 'Red Screen' would make for nice Creepshow episodes, with no overt gruesome horror but plenty of weird vibes."

== See also ==
- Stephen King short fiction bibliography
