= The Contention of Ajax and Ulysses =

1659 play written by James Shirley

The Contention of Ajax and Ulysses for the Armour of Achilles is a short comedic Caroline era stage play, a 'Dramatic Interlude' in three scenes written by James Shirley performed 1654-58 and first published in 1659. As its title indicates, the subject of the play is a staple of the Greek classical literature: the fate of Achilles' armour, after the hero was fatally wounded in the heel by Hector. Shirley most likely drew upon Book 13 of the Metamorphoses of Ovid as his direct source, along with Thomas Heywood's play The Iron Age. The poem from the final scene, "The glories of our blood and state", has been set to music several times.

== History ==
The play was first printed in an octavo volume issued by the bookseller John Crooke, containing both The Contention and another play by Shirley, Honoria and Mammon. The title page states that The Contention was "nobly represented by young gentlemen of quality, at a private entertainment of some persons of honour." No specific data about the stage history of either piece has survived, however; both may have been works that Shirley prepared for performance by the schoolboys he taught after the theatres closed with the start of the English Civil War in 1642.

While not one of Shirley's most notable stage works, the third and final scene of The Contention contains a funeral dirge spoken by the seer Calchas for Ajax who has committed suicide while consumed with rage that Ulysses alone had been awarded the armour of Achilles. The poem begins "The glories of our blood and state / Are shadows, not substantial things," which has been often excerpted and reproduced, sometimes under the title of "Death the Leveller." Included in collections of familiar quotations, the poem is the most famous and popular work in Shirley's canon; Louisa May Alcott quotes its concluding line in Little Women.

== Synopsis ==
The play is set in the Grecian camp outside the walls of Troy, during the Trojan War; it opens soon after the death of Achilles, with Lycippus and Dydimus (the pages of Ajax and Ulysses) disputing the relative worths of their masters. The pages' dispute quickly turns into an argument, an exchange of vituperative insults, and then a fight. The fight is broken up by the entrance of Calchas, the most famous seer of his age, who clears away the pages for the debate that is about to take place: Ajax and Ulysses are going to contend over who has the right to the amour of Achilles. The Greek generals and officers, led by Agamemnon and including Menelaus, Nestor, Thersander, and Diomedes, enter and seat themselves to hear the debate; Ajax and Ulysses follow. Ajax begins, and makes long and fulsome speeches in praise of his own valor and prowess in battle; he also attacks the courage, character, and manner of speech of his opponent. Ulysses speaks second, and is far more eloquent and perceptive, turning Ajax's bluster against him. Once the contenders withdraw, the generals decide to award Achilles' armor to Ulysses.

The play's second scene opens with Lycippus and Dydimus making up their argument and shaking hands. Polybrontes, a politician, becomes the object of their merriment. Meanwhile Ajax has lost his mind as a result of his defeat by Ulysses, slays Polybrontes in a rage, mistakes Chalcas for Ulysses, and eventually commits suicide. The brief third and final scene shows Chalcas declaiming a dirge for Ajax during his funeral procession towards the temple.

== Musical settings ==
The dirge in Scene 3 was set to music at the time by Edward Coleman, first printed in The Musical Companion of 1667, and published a number of times thereafter. It was well known as a song — King Charles II was reportedly fond of it, as performed by the versatile bass singer John Bowman.

Hubert Parry made a setting of the poem for chorus and orchestra in 1883, published in 1885 as The Glories of our Blood and State.

Granville Bantock set the poem for 4-part male chorus and piano, published in 1910 'In Memoriam Edward VII'.
