= The Dreamers (novella) =

2024 novella by Stephen King

- Author: Stephen King
- Language: English
- Genre: Cosmic horror
- Set in: Castle Rock, Maine, United States
- Publisher: Scribner
- Publication date: May 21, 2024
- Publication place: United States
- Media type: Print (Hardcover)

The Dreamers is a novella by Stephen King, first published in King's 2024 collection You Like It Darker.

== Plot summary ==
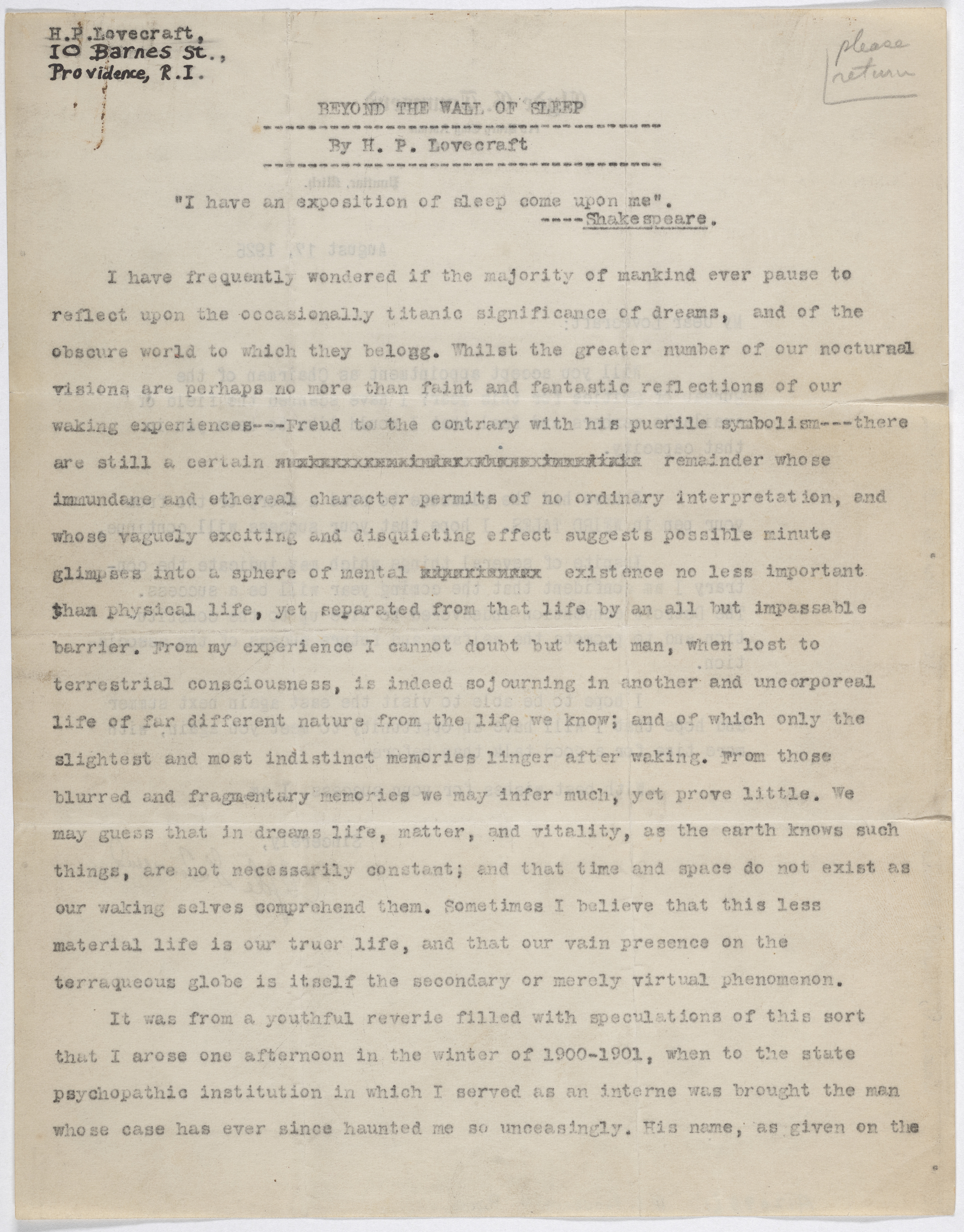
The Dreamers drew comparisons to H. P. Lovecraft's 1919 work "Beyond the Wall of Sleep", which is referenced within the novella.

In June 1971, Vietnam War veteran William Davis is discharged from the military; his wartime experiences have left him "empty", with his "emotions scrubbed". After staying with his mother in Skowhegan, Maine, Davis relocates to Portland, Maine and finds work as a stenographer for Temp-O. The following year, Davis responds to a job advertisement posted by Elgin, a self-described gentleman scientist in Castle Rock, Maine. Elgin hires Davis as an assistant for his experiments, which aim to "go under" the "wall of sleep".

Elgin and Davis begin their experiments, which entail administering the hypnotic drug Flurazepam to a human test subject who is instructed to study a picture of a red house with a green door in a forest. The subject is then instructed to dream of the house, and then to enter the house and attempt to lift up the living room floor and see what is beneath. Elgin and Davis watch the subject through a one-way mirror, with Davis transcribing the subject's remarks.

Davis witnesses the teeth of the first subject, Althea Gibson, grow larger. After awakening, she states that upon lifting the living room floor in her dream, she saw "darkness" and smelled a "stench". Elgin explains to Davis that the drug rendered Althea suggestible, enabling her to access "the reality beneath the dream". Elgin theorizes that dreams are a barrier between humans and the "matrix of existence", and that his experiments will enable him to look past this barrier.

The second and third experiments are unsuccessful, while the fourth test subject does not appear. The fifth subject, Hiram Gaskill, writes "the moon is full of demons" in Vietnamese on a writing pad while asleep. Davis grows apprehensive and advises Elgin to terminate the experiment; Elgin refuses. Davis himself ultimately decides to remain Elgin's assistant, seeing his curiosity in the experiment as a sign that his humanity remains. The sixth subject, Annette Crosby, awakens screaming, having dreamed of opening the green door to encounter a disembodied voice that uttered a word resembling "tantullah" or "tamtusha".

The final test subject is Burt Devereaux. During the experiment, Devereaux's eyeballs turn black, swell and split, emitting floating black filaments. He is left catatonic. Davis drives Devereaux to a rest area off Maine State Route 119 and abandons him there in his car, then hitchhikes back to Castle Rock. When he arrives back at Elgin's house, he finds Elgin in the test room with his head swathed in the filaments. As Davis watches, the filaments spell out his name on the one-way mirror. Davis turns on the house's gas stove and uses his lighter to ignite an explosion that destroys the house.

Davis returns to Temp-O. When he is eventually interviewed by the police, he maintains that he left Elgin's employ some time before the explosion. In September 1972, Davis relocates to Nebraska, where he begins working on a farm. Davis dreams of standing outside the red house with the green door; he knows that one day he will open the door and enter the house, where "there will be no mercy".

== Publication ==
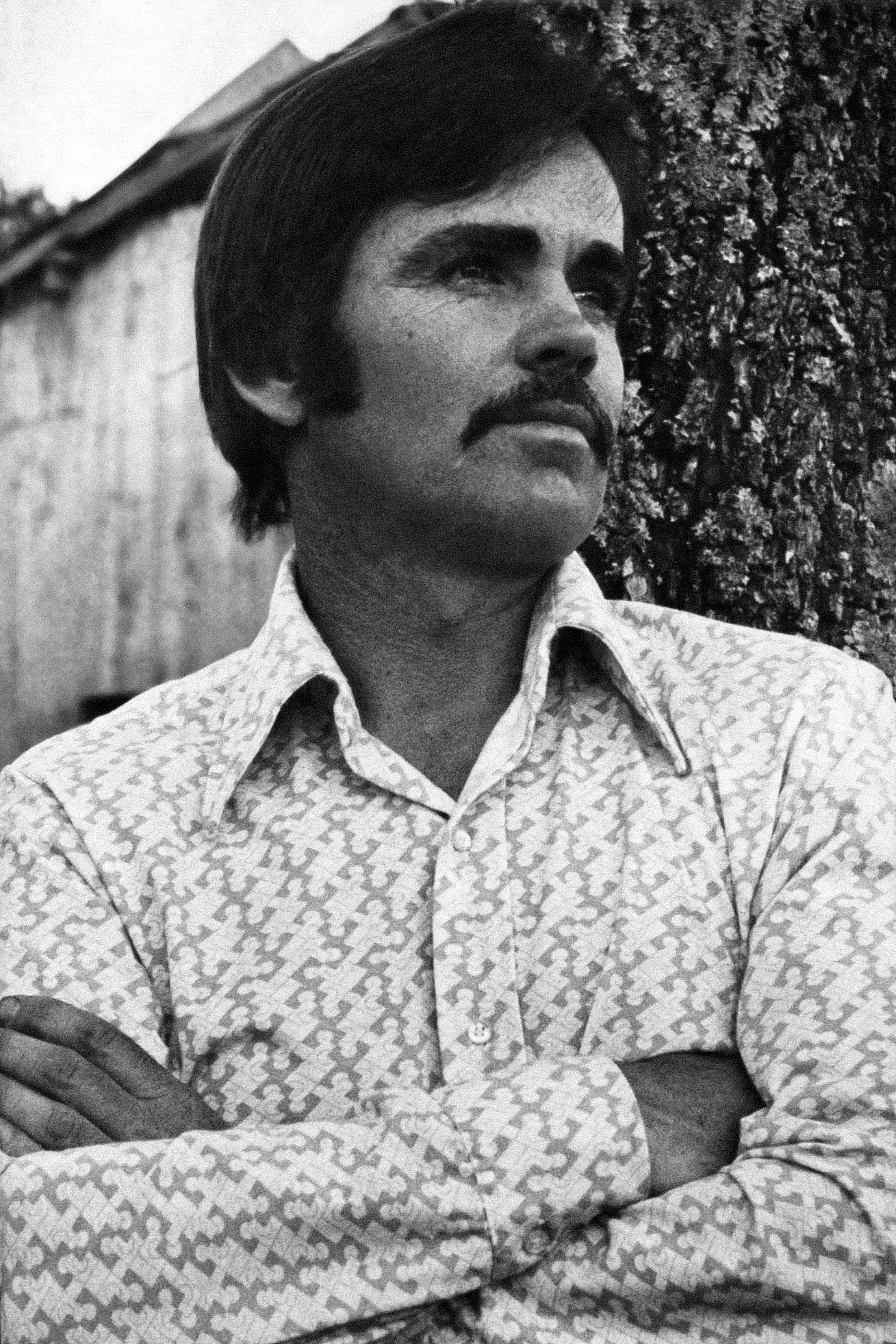
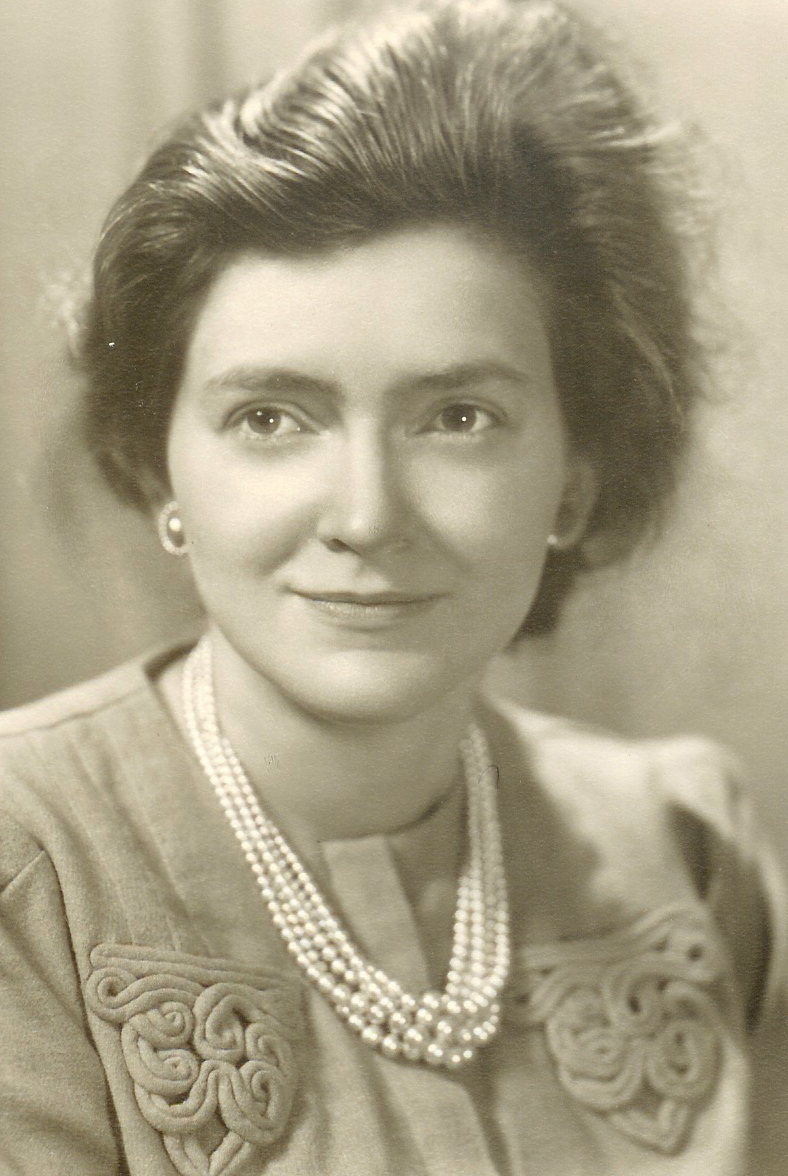
The Dreamers was dedicated to the authors Cormac McCarthy (left) and Evangeline Walton (right).

Paying tribute to author Cormac McCarthy upon his death in June 2023, King previewed The Dreamers, a story he had written while reading McCarthy's 2022 book The Passenger. He described The Dreamers as "very much under the influence of McCarthy's prose" and "very much in McCarthy's style", also saying "I stole his style for that story; it made the story possible". In August 2023, King noted The Dreamers as a rare example of one of his stories that he himself was scared by, describing it as "so creepy" that he "couldn't think about it at night". The Dreamers was published in 2024 as part of King's collection You Like It Darker. The story was dedicated to McCarthy, and to the fantasy author Evangeline Walton.

== Reception ==
Jenn Adams (reviewing You Like It Darker for Bloody Disgusting) ranked The Dreamers as the "most classically scary" story in the volume, describing it as "pure Lovecraftian horror" and "shocking horror and nihilism at its best, reminiscent of King's 2014 novel Revival." Gorian Delpâture (writing for RTBF) described The Dreamers as "both a tribute to Cormac McCarthy (in style) and to HP Lovecraft (in theme)". Sassan Niasseri (writing for Rolling Stone) also noted the Lovecraftian influence and the resemblance to Revival, as well as noting the influence of Cormac McCarthy and the contrast between McCarthy's "laconic" writing style and King's "flowery" style. Mike Finn suggested that the story "...worked because it focused more on the struggle of a young man who has recently returned from the war in Vietnam and who has grown so used to numbing his feelings that he is now unable to connect with life and the living. His fatalism and his emotional distance gave this story of a scientist meddling with things best left alone a depth that surprised me." Eric Eisenberg described The Dreamers as "one of the scariest stories that Stephen King has written in the 21st century". Ali Karim of Shots magazine described The Dreamers as "a superbly realised cosmic horror piece", while Brandon Truitt of USA Today described The Dreamers as "good old-fashioned cosmic terror". Bev Vincent noted The Dreamers as an example of the "common theme in King's stories [...] that the other universes that abut against ours are not nice places."

A less positive review was received from Justin Hamelin, who stated that The Dreamers "...just missed the honor roll for me", noting "the outright mention of Lovecraft and one of his strongest works pulled me out of the story a bit, even for only a paragraph or so." SFX described the story as "a baffling attempt to merge HP Lovecraft and mad scientist movies."

== See also ==
- Stephen King short fiction bibliography
- "Beyond the Wall of Sleep"
- Lovecraftian horror
- Revival
