= Beyond the Wall of Sleep =

1919 short story by H. P. Lovecraft

- Short story by H. P. Lovecraft
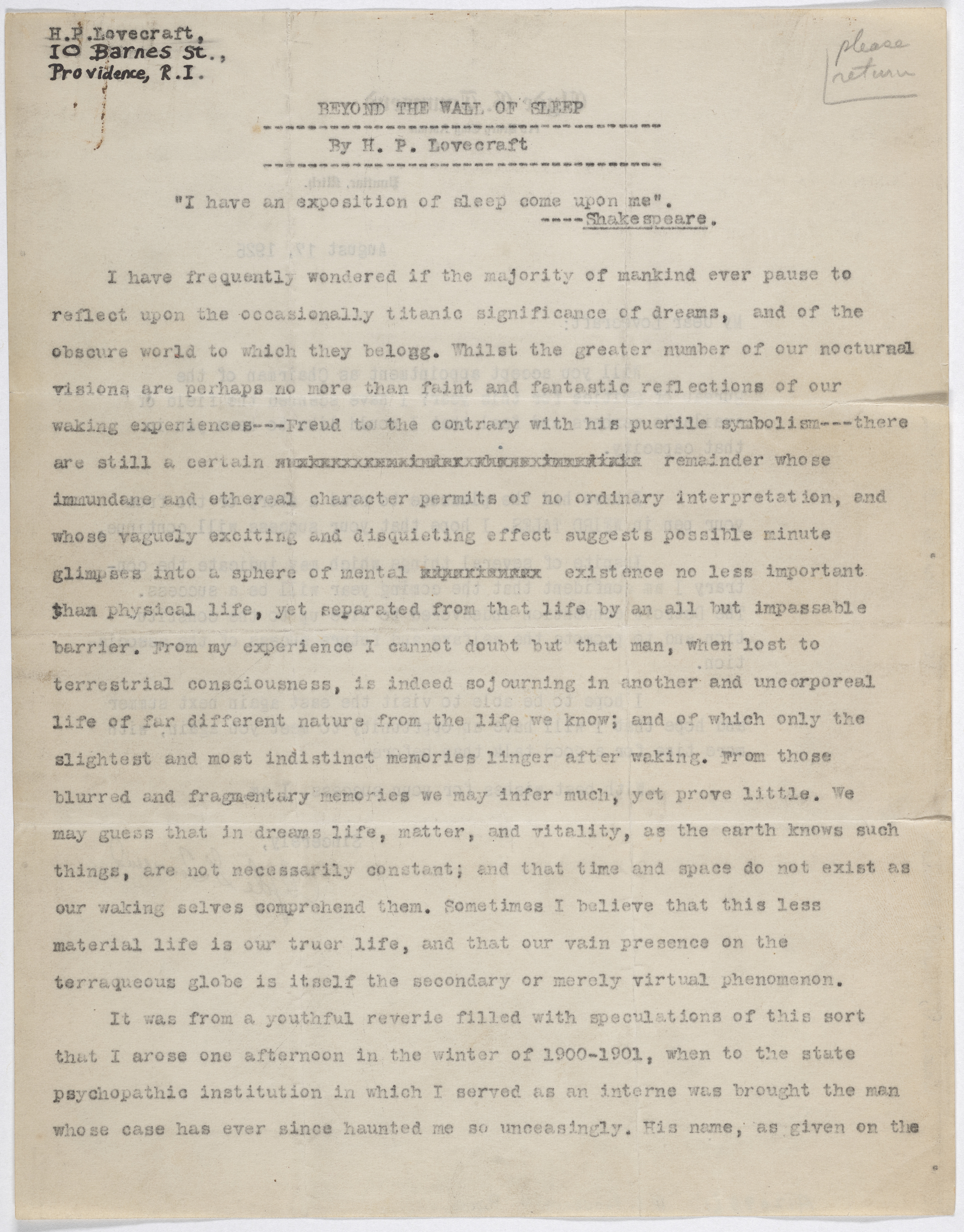

Text available at Wikisource
- Country: United States
- Language: English
- Genre: Science fiction

Publication
- Published in: Pine Cones
- Publication type: Magazine
- Publication date: October 1919

"Beyond the Wall of Sleep" is a science fiction short story by American writer H. P. Lovecraft, written in 1919 and first published in the amateur publication Pine Cones in October 1919.

== Plot ==
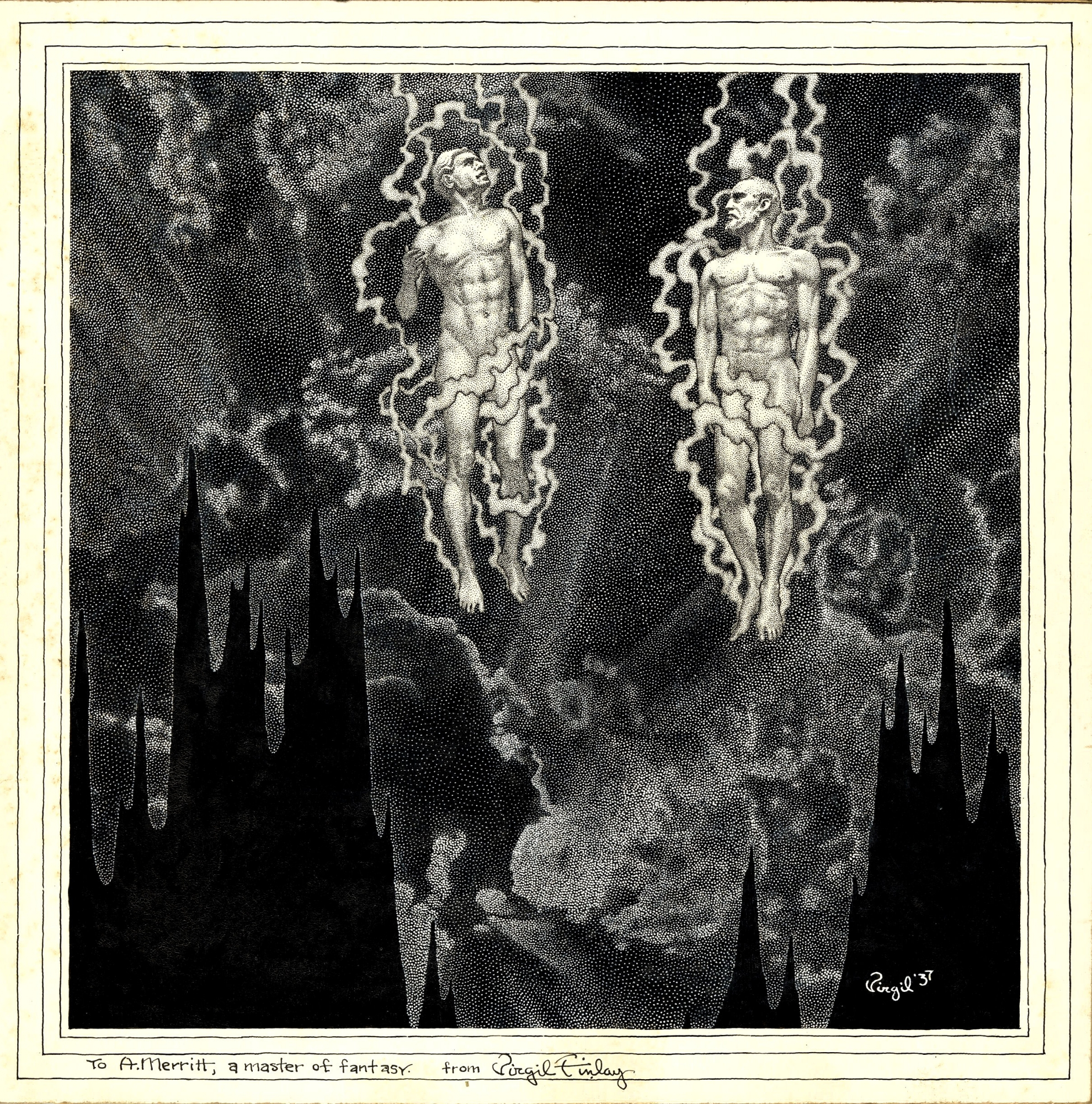
Main illustration for the story "Beyond the Wall of Sleep". Internal illustration from the pulp magazine Weird Tales (March 1938, vol. 31, no. 3, page 331).

A former intern and a worker of a mental hospital relates his experience with Joe Slater, an inmate who died at the facility a few weeks after being confined as a criminally insane murderer. He describes Slater as a "typical denizen of the Catskill Mountain region, who corresponds exactly with the 'white trash' of the South", for whom "laws and morals are nonexistent" and whose "general mental status is probably below that of any other native American people". Although Slater's crime was exceedingly brutal and unprovoked, he had an "absurd appearance of harmless stupidity" and the doctors guessed his age at about forty. During the third night of his confinement, Slater had the first of his "attacks". He burst out from an uneasy sleep and into a frenzy which was so violent that it took four orderlies to restrain and strait-jacket him. For nearly fifteen minutes he gave vent to an incredible rant. The words were in the voice and couched in the paltry vocabulary of Slater but the onlookers could construe from the inadequate language a vision of:

green edifices of light, oceans of space, strange music, and shadowy mountains and valleys. But most of all did he dwell upon some mysterious blazing entity that shook and laughed and mocked at him. This vast, vague personality seemed to have done him a terrible wrong and to kill it in triumphant revenge was his paramount desire. In order to reach it... he would soar through abysses of emptiness 'burning' every obstacle that stood in his way.

The ranting stopped as suddenly as it had started. This was the first of what would become nightly "attacks" of a similar nature. The peripheral otherworldly images of Slater's visions were different and more fantastic with each successive night, but always there was the central theme of the blazing entity and its revenge. The doctors were perplexed with Slater's case. Where did a backward man like Slater get such visions, when surely an illiterate rustic like him would have had little if any exposure to fairy tales or fantasy stories? Not that there were stories similar to Slater's. Why, too, was Slater dying?

As an undergraduate, the intern had built a device for two-way telepathic communication which he had tested with a fellow student with no result. The device was designed around his principle that thought was ultimately a form of radiant energy. Heedless of any ethics, he attached himself with Slater to the device as Slater lay near death. With the device switched on, he received a message from a light being whose experiences had been what were transmitted through Slater's medium. This being explained that, when not shackled to their physical bodies, all humans are light beings. The thought-message went on to explain that, as light beings within the realm of sleep, humans can experience the vistas of many planes and universes which remain unknown to waking awareness.

The intern understood that the light being would now become completely incorporeal, and finally undertake a last battle with its nemesis near Algol. Slater died then, and there were no further transmissions. That night an enormously bright star was discovered in the sky near Algol. Within a week it had dimmed to the luminosity of an ordinary star and in a few months it had become barely visible to the naked eye.

== Inspiration ==
Lovecraft said the story was inspired by an April 27, 1919 article in the New York Tribune. Reporting on the New York state police, the article cited a family named Slater or Slahter as representative of the backwards Catskills population.

The nova mentioned at the end of Lovecraft's story is a real star, a nova known as GK Persei; the quotation is from Garrett P. Serviss' Astronomy with the Naked Eye (1908).

The title of the story may have been influenced by Ambrose Bierce's "Beyond the Wall"; Lovecraft was known to be reading Bierce in 1919. Jack London's 1906 novel Before Adam, which concerns the concept of hereditary memory, contains the passage, "Nor...did any of my human kind ever break through the wall of my sleep."

== Publication ==
"Beyond the Wall of Sleep" was first published in October 1919 in Pine Cones, an amateur journal edited by John Clinton Pryor. It was subsequently reprinted in The Fantasy Fan (October 1934) and Weird Tales (March 1938).

== Reception ==
The book Science-Fiction: The Early Years describes the concepts of both "Beyond the Wall of Sleep" and "From Beyond" as "very interesting, despite stiff, immature writing."

== Other media ==
- A graphic novel adaptation written by Steven Philip Jones and drawn by Octavio Cariello was originally published in 1991 by Malibu Graphics. It was reprinted in an individual graphic novel in 2016 by Caliber Comics and is part of Caliber's H. P. Lovecraft Worlds anthology series.
- Several metal bands have recorded songs inspired by this story, including Black Sabbath (covered by Macabre and Static-X), Sentenced, Manticora, and Opeth, as well as guitarist Christian Muenzner.
- Beyond the Wall of Sleep (2006), movie starring Tom Savini and William Sanderson
- Unspeakable: Beyond the Wall of Sleep (2025), movie starring Edward Furlong and Bai Ling
- In The Dreamers by Stephen King a scientist conducts experiments to "go under" the wall of sleep and keeps a copy of Beyond the Wall of Sleep.
