= Rattlesnakes (novella) =

Novella by Stephen King

- Author: Stephen King
- Language: English
- Genre: Horror fiction
- Set in: Florida, United States
- Publisher: Scribner
- Publication date: May 21, 2024
- Publication place: United States
- Media type: Print (Hardcover)
- Preceded by: Cujo

Rattlesnakes is a novella by Stephen King, first published in 2024 as part of King's collection You Like It Darker. It is a sequel to King's 1981 novel Cujo, reintroducing the character of Vic Trenton.

== Plot summary ==
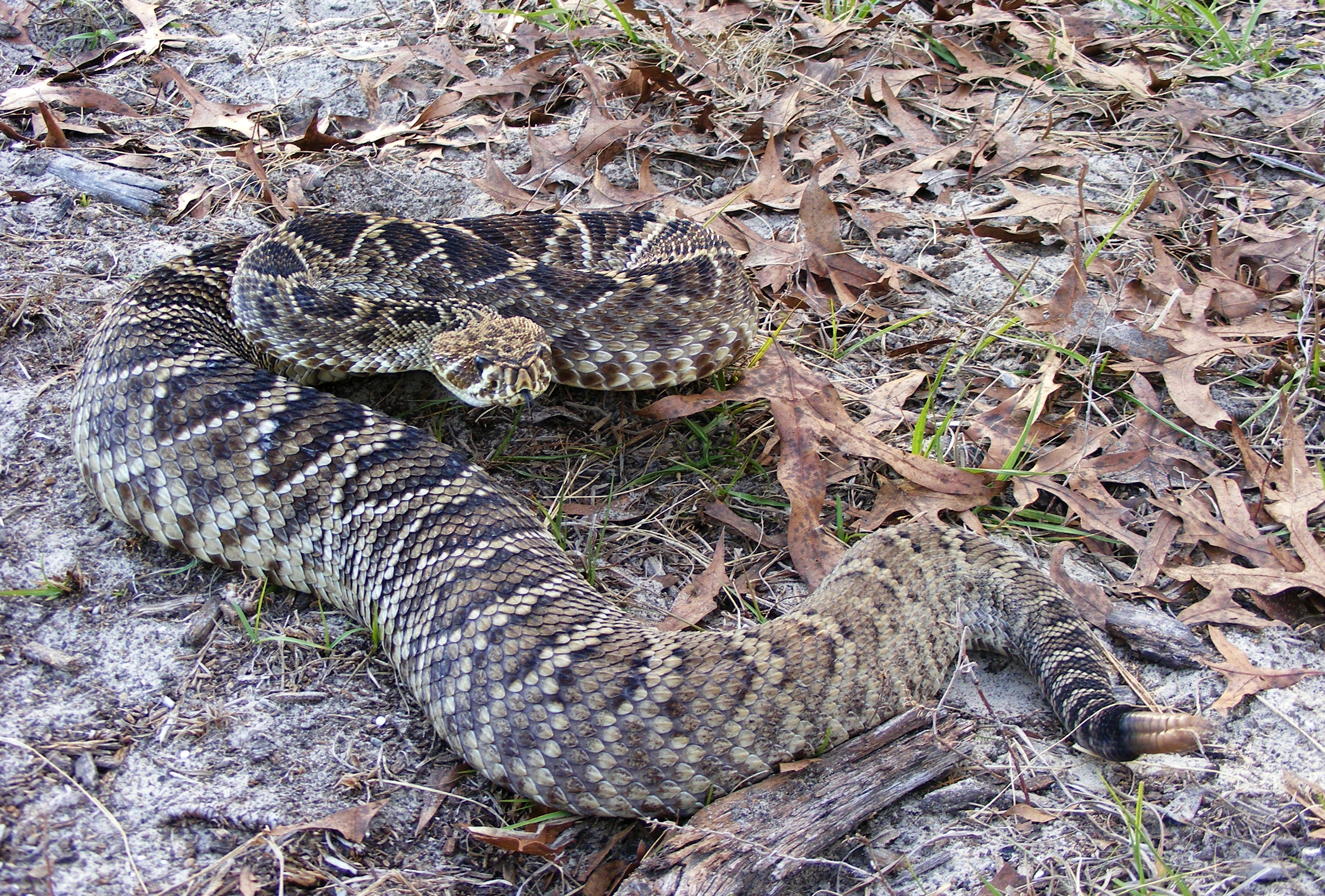
The antagonists of the story are ghostly twins who were killed by the titular rattlesnakes.

In 1980, advertising executive Vic Trenton's four-year-old son Tad died from dehydration after he and his mother, Vic's wife Donna, were trapped in a broken-down car in Castle Rock, Maine, by Cujo, a rabid St. Bernard dog. (Note: As depicted in Cujo (1981)) The trauma of Tad's death led the couple to divorce; decades later they reconciled and remarried, but Donna died several years later from cancer. Shortly before her death, Donna seemingly saw, and spoke to, the ghost of Tad as an adult; Vic believes that Tad came to escort Donna into the afterlife.

Over 40 years later, the now-retired Vic is weathering the COVID-19 pandemic in his friend Greg's McMansion on Rattlesnake Key along Florida's Gulf Coast. While walking he encounters Alita Bell, an elderly woman pushing a large, squeaky-wheeled stroller with children's t-shirts on its seats. Alita introduces Vic to her four-year-old twin sons, Jacob and Joseph, who she seemingly believes are seated in the empty stroller. Vic, forewarned by Greg, humors Alita by pretending to see the boys.

Several days later, Alita visits Vic to bring him cookies. During the visit, she claims the twins are playing in Greg's study; later, Vic is momentarily unsettled to see that a wicker basket containing the toys of Greg's cat has been upended. The caretaker, Mr. Ito, tells Vic that Alita's sons, Jacob and Joseph, died in the early 1980s after wandering out of her garden and being bitten by rattlesnakes, with their father dying from a heart attack after finding their bodies. Following the twins' deaths, a posse drove the snakes to a shell beach at the north end of the island where they were wiped out.

While walking the following day, Vic finds Alita's corpse in her driveway next to the stroller; he summons the police, who remove the body and lock the stroller in Alita's garage. The next morning, Vic awakens to find the stroller in his house's courtyard. While pushing the stroller back to Alita's house, he inadvertently touches the t-shirts, causing him to have a vision of the twins' deaths. The police dismiss the appearance of the stroller as a prank. That night, Vic hears the stroller in his bathroom; when he enters, he sees the stroller with burial suits on its seats and a bathtub full of rattlesnakes, with a child's hand projecting and beckoning to him. Vic flees; when he finally returns, there is no sign of the snakes, but the stroller has moved to the courtyard.

The next day, while planning to flee the island, Vic is visited by Andy Pelley, a semi-retired police officer. Pelley provides more information on the destruction of the snakes; the majority were burned alive on the beach, while others drowned in a whirlpool while trying to swim to a neighboring island, Duma Key (which was submerged by a massive tropical storm in the 2000s). (Note: As depicted in Duma Key (2008)) Pelley instructs Vic not to leave the island, revealing that Alita made a new will shortly before her death leaving all her assets to Vic; Pelley suspects Vic of coercing Alita into writing the will and murdering her.

Vic is stalked by the stroller and the ghosts of the twins, who telepathically urge him to "see us, roll us, dress us." Vic surmises that the ghosts were driven insane by their violent deaths and are attempting to reclaim their childhood. He visits a gazebo at the end of the house's boardwalk, where he implores Tad to help him. Tad's ghost scratches the letters "PRA" on the gazebo's floor, which Vic interprets to mean "pram". Reading the message, Vic realizes how he can banish the ghosts. He pushes the stroller to the shell beach; during the trip, the twins grow suspicious. They attack Vic, first with a horde of spectral rattlesnakes, then with two living rattlesnakes, which Vic dispatches using Alita's snake-pole. Vic throws the stroller into the whirlpool, banishing the ghosts. He momentarily sees a vision of Duma Key above the waves, and an adult Tad waving to him.

Three years later, Vic is living in Newburyport, Massachusetts. Alita's autopsy and toxicology screening found no evidence of foul play, exonerating Vic. Pelley continues to harbor suspicions against him, but has also started to realize that unnatural forces were at work. Vic ultimately inherits $4.5 million from Alita; he keeps $500,000 and donates the remainder to a food bank in Sarasota. As the story ends, a consortium of real estate agents is exploring plans to reclaim Duma Key via dredging; Vic believes that this will lead to the stroller being found, and fears that the ghosts of the twins might once again pursue him.

== Relation to other works ==
The protagonist of Rattlesnakes, Vic Trenton originally appeared in King's 1981 novel Cujo. Trenton's wife Donna and son Tad also appear as characters in the story.

Rattlesnakes takes place on Rattlesnake Key, which is described as lying to the south of Duma Key, the island introduced in King's titular 2008 novel. Sunk by a tropical storm following the events of the novel, mention is made of plans to restore Duma Key.

The characters of Lloyd Sunderland and Laurie from King's 2018 short story "Laurie" make a cameo appearance in Rattlesnakes, attending the funeral of Alita Bell.

== Publication ==
Rattlesnakes is a sequel to King's 1981 novel Cujo. The story is set on "Rattlesnake Key", a fictional island on the Florida Gulf Coast, to the south of another of King's fictional islands, Duma Key. King was inspired to write the story while listening to "Highway 49" by the Jeff Healey Band on a walk; the story "came into [his] mind, fully blown". King announced Rattlesnakes in May 2022. It was published in May 2024 as part of King's collection You Like It Darker. The story was dedicated to John D. MacDonald, who wrote extensively about Florida. An audiobook version of the story was narrated by actor Will Patton.

== Reception ==
Writing for Bloody Disgusting, Jenn Adams described Rattlesnakes as a "gut-wrenching tale" featuring "moments of stark terror and shocking gore" and "deliver[ing] a bloody bite reminiscent of King's early career along with a harrowing warning against holding on to the past." Neil McRobert (writing for Vulture) described Rattlesnakes as "one of [King's] most striking engagements with the malign supernatural in quite some time" Eric Eisenberg described Rattlesnakes as "a scary and original ghost story that inspects the extreme grief that comes with losing a child". Mike Finn described Rattlesnakes as "classic Stephen King", stating that "...King evokes a real place, populates it with real people and then makes the supernatural overwhelmingly real." Matthew Jackson (writing for Paste) described Rattlesnakes as "a heady mix of emotional turmoil, vivid terror, and pure visceral power". SFX described Rattlesnakes as "a classic, you could say formulaic, King ghost story that has little new to offer, but is well-crafted and well creepy". Justin Hamelin described Rattlesnakes as "damn near the perfect King ghost story, with the supernatural meeting grief and paranoia halfway. Think Duma Key meets Bag of Bones if they strolled through Pet Sematary", adding "King has an uncanny talent to catch us up with characters as if we bumped into them on a walk in the park. He also does what only he seems to do so brilliantly, turning a mostly unimpressive inanimate object into an avatar of terror yet again." Writing for USA Today, Brandon Truitt stated that Rattlesnakes "...brings a little healing catharsis to a traumatizing read ("Cujo" definitely sticks with you) and opens up a new wound with unnerving bite." Carl Little wrote that the story "features some classic King motifs, including demonic twins".

== See also ==
- Stephen King short fiction bibliography
- Cujo
- Duma Key
