= 1659 in literature =

This article contains information about the literary events and publications of 1659.

== Events ==
- January 27 – The poet Andrew Marvell is elected a member of Parliament for Kingston upon Hull in England's Third Protectorate Parliament.
- August – William Davenant is briefly imprisoned for his part in George Booth's Cheshire uprising in favor of restoring the English Monarchy.
- unknown dates
  - Méric Casaubon edits John Dee's journal of angel magic.
  - The Icelandic pastor Jón Magnússon completes his Píslarsaga (Passion Saga, or Story of My Sufferings).

== New books ==
=== Prose ===
- Richard Baxter – The Holy Commonwealth
- Méric Casaubon (ed.) – A True & Faithful Relation of What passed for many Yeers between Dr. John Dee (A Mathematician of Great Fame in Q. Eliz. and King James their Reignes) and some spirits
- Thomas Hobbes – De Homine
- Christiaan Huygens – Systema Saturnium
- Ninon de l'Enclos – La Coquette vengée (The Flirt Avenged)
- Richard Lovelace – Lucasta (posthumous)
- William Prynne – Parliamentary Writs (further parts in 1660, 1662 and 1664)
- Johann Heinrich Rahn – Teutsche Algebra
- Péter Révay – De monarchia et sacra corona regni hungariae centuriae septem
- John Rushworth – Historical Collections of Private Passages of State... (also The Rushworth Papers)
- Anna Maria van Schurman – The Learned Maid, or Whether a Maid May Be a Scholar? (English version of 1638 Latin original)
- Jeremy Taylor – Discourse on the Nature, Offices and Measures of Friendship

=== Drama ===
- Anonymous – The London Chanticleers
- Richard Brome – Five New Plays, including The English Moor, The Lovesick Court, The Weeding of Covent Garden, The New Academy, and The Queen and Concubine
- Joan Leonardsz Blasius – De Edelmoedige Vijanden
- Sir William Davenant – The History of Sir Francis Drake
- John Day and Henry Chettle – The Blind Beggar of Bethnal Green (published six decades after its premiere)
- Juan Bautista Diamante – El honrador de su padre
- Richard Flecknoe – The Marriage of Oceanus and Britannia
- Molière – Les Précieuses ridicules
- Walter Montague – The Shepherd's Paradise
- Agustín Moreto – No puede ser...
- James Shirley
  - The Contention of Ajax and Ulysses
  - Honoria and Mammon
- Joost van den Vondel – Jephta

=== Poetry ===
- William Chamberlayne – Pharonnida: A heroick poem
- Luis de Ulloa Pereira – Versos

== Births ==
- January 1 – Humphrey Hody, English theologian and archdeacon (died 1707)
- March – Margrethe Lasson, Danish novelist (died 1738)
- March 25 – John Asgill, English pamphleteer (died 1738)
- March 26 – William Wollaston, English philosopher, classicist and cleric (died 1724)
- April 29 – Sophia Elisabet Brenner, Swedish poet and writer (died 1730)
- unknown dates
  - Thomas Creech, English classicist and translator (died 1700)
  - Kata Szidónia Petrőczy, Hungarian poet (died 1708)

== Deaths ==
- January 7 – Laurenz Forer, Swiss theologian and controversialist writing in Latin and German (born 1580)
- January 31 – János Apáczai Csere, Hungarian linguist, mathematician and encyclopedist (born 1625)
- February 4 – Francis Osborne, English essayist (born 1593)
- April 15 – Simon Dach, German poet and hymnist (born 1605)
- June 3 – Morgan Llwyd, Welsh preacher, poet and writer (born 1619)
- September 22 – Thomas Morton, English polemicist and bishop (born 1564)
- October 27 – Giovanni Francesco Busenello, Italian poet and librettist (born 1598)
