= Flight or Fright =

Short story anthology edited Stephen King and Bev Vincent

- First edition
- Editors: Stephen King; Bev Vincent
- Language: English
- Genre: Horror
- Publisher: Cemetery Dance Publications
- Publication date: September 4, 2018
- Publication place: United States
- Media type: Print (hardcover)
- Pages: 336
- ISBN: 978-1-587-67679-6

Flight or Fright is a horror anthology edited by Stephen King and Bev Vincent, published by Cemetery Dance Publications on September 4, 2018. All of the stories within the anthology are about flight-based horrors.

The audiobook of Flight or Fright was released on September 4, 2018, by Simon & Schuster Audio. It is narrated by Stephen King, Bev Vincent, Norbert Leo Butz, Christian Coulson, Santino Fontana, Simon Jones, Graeme Malcolm, Elizabeth Marvel, David Morse, and Corey Stoll.

== Background ==
At a dinner with friends, before a screening of The Dark Tower in Bangor, Maine, Stephen King brought up how much he hated flying. This sparked a conversation about various stories on the fear of flying, and other horrors that can happen in flight. King said "there [has] never been a collection of flight-based horror stories [...] someone ought to do the book", to which Richard Chizmar responded "I would, in a heartbeat." This discussion prompted King and Bev Vincent to collect and edit Flight or Fright, with Chizmar publishing it under Cemetery Dance Publications.

== Stories ==
#	Title	Author	Originally published in
1	"Cargo"	E. Michael Lewis	Shades of Darkness (2008) by Barbara Roden & Christopher Roden
2	"The Horror of the Heights"	Sir Arthur Conan Doyle	November 1913 issue of The Strand Magazine
3	"Nightmare at 20,000 Feet"	Richard Matheson	Alone by Night (1962) by Don Congdon & Michael Congdon
4	"The Flying Machine"	Ambrose Bierce	First published as "The Clipper of the Clouds" in the April 3, 1891 issue of the San Francisco Examiner
5	"Lucifer!"	E. C. Tubb	Vision of Tomorrow #3 (1969) by Philip Harbottle
6	"The Fifth Category"	Tom Bissell	Fall 2014 issue of The Normal School
7	"Two Minutes Forty-Five Seconds"	Dan Simmons	April 1988 issue of Omni
8	"Diablitos"	Cody Goodfellow	A Breath from the Sky: Unusual Stories of Possession (2017) by Scott R. Jones
9	"Air Raid"	John Varley	Asimov's Choice: Black Holes & Bug-Eyed-Monsters (1977) by George H. Scithers
10	"You Are Released"`	Joe Hill	Previously unpublished
11	"Warbirds"	David J. Schow	A Dark and Deadly Valley (2007) by Mike Heffernan
12	"The Flying Machine"	Ray Bradbury	The Golden Apples of the Sun (1953) by Ray Bradbury
13	"Zombies on a Plane"	Bev Vincent	Dead Set: A Zombie Anthology (2010) by Michael McCrary & Joe McKinney
14	"They Shall Not Grow Old"	Roald Dahl	Over to You: Ten Stories of Flyers and Flying (1946) by Roald Dahl
15	"Murder in the Air"	Peter Tremayne	The Mammoth Book of Locked Room Mysteries and Impossible Crimes (2000) by Mike Ashley
16	"The Turbulence Expert"	Stephen King	Previously unpublished
17	"Falling"	James Dickey	February 11, 1967 issue of The New Yorker

== Reception ==
Publishers Weekly called Flight or Fright "a strong anthology full of satisfying tales", saying it "will have the reader thinking twice about flying." Becky Spratford of Booklist said, "Whether readers take it to the airport or read it with feet firmly planted on the ground, Flight or Fright delivers on its promised theme and will make the next plane ride a little more exciting."

== See also ==
- Stephen King bibliography
- Stephen King short fiction bibliography
