= Memory (Stephen King) =

- Short story by Stephen King
- Country: United States
- Language: English
- Genre: Short story

Publication
- Published in: Tin House
- Media type: Print
- Publication date: 2006

Chronology
The Things They Left Behind	Willa

"Memory" is a short story by Stephen King, originally published in 2006. It was the basis for King's 2008 novel Duma Key.

== Plot summary ==
Edgar Freemantle is the millionaire owner of The Freemantle Company, a Minnesota-based general contractor. While visiting a construction site, he is severely injured in an accident that sees him lose most of his right arm, break multiple bones, and lose part of the vision in his right eye. Freemantle suffers from amnesia and mood swings, leading to the end of his marriage six months following the accident.

After Freemantle begins contemplating suicide, his psychologist Dr Xander Kamen encourages him to resume his childhood hobby of sketching. While convalescing by Lake Phalen, Freemantle witnesses a car accident in which his neighbor's dog, "Gandalf", is struck by a car. Realizing Gandalf is fatally injured, Freemantle channels memories of his own accident, which inexplicably gives him the strength to euthanise the dog using his left arm. When Freemantle discusses the incident with Kamen, Kamen tells him that "it's the bad memories that wear thin first [then] they tear open and let the light through".

== Publication ==
"Memory" was originally published in volume 7, number 4 of Tin House in summer 2006. It was republished as an annex to the 2007 work Blaze, which King published under the pseudonym Richard Bachman. King went on to adapt "Memory" into a novel, Duma Key, which was published in 2008.

King read "Memory" during the "Seven Days of Opening Nights" event at Florida State University on February 26, 2006, where he became a guest speaker after filling in for Richard Russo when he was unable to attend. King explained that the story was partially inspired by his 1999 car accident and how much of the incident he could and could not remember.

== See also ==
- Duma Key
- Stephen King short fiction bibliography
