= Honoria and Mammon =

Stage play by James Shirley

- Original language: English
- Written by: James Shirley
- Characters: Honoria; Mammon; Conquest; Alamode; Phantasme; Alworth; Fulbanke; Maslin; Traverse; Dash; Squanderbag; Doctor
- Genre: Morality, Comedy
- Setting: Metropolis, or New-Troy (London)

Premiere
- Date: 21 November 2013 (published 1659)
- Place: London

Honoria and Mammon is a Caroline era stage play by James Shirley, first published in 1659 though not produced until 2013. It is a revision and expansion of Shirley's earlier morality play A Contention for Honor and Riches (c. 1630, printed 1633), and illustrates the persistence of influence of archaic forms of drama through the final phase of English Renaissance theatre.

== Publication ==
The play was first printed in 1659 (though the publication date has sometimes been erroneously listed as 1658), in an octavo volume issued by the bookseller John Crook that also contains Shirley's The Contention of Ajax and Ulysses. In that edition, Honoria and Mammon bears a dedication by Shirley "To the Candid Reader." The scene of the play is identified as "Metropolis, or New-Troy."

== Synopsis ==
The Lady Honoria has three suitors for her hand in marriage: Alamode, a courtier; Alworth, a scholar; and Conquest, a colonel. Lady Aurelia Mammon — "widow / To the late high treasurer, Sir Omnipotent Mammon" — has two suitors of her own, a wealthy Londoner named Fulbank and a countryman called Maslin. Honoria introduces Alworth to Mammon, but she dismisses him as beneath her consideration. Alamode and Conquest fight a duel over Honoria; Conquest wins, disarming Alamode and knocking him down. Maslin and Fulbank similarly quarrel over Mammon, though mutual cowardice saves them from serious fighting. Lady Mammon's gentleman usher, a demon called Phantasm (the Vice in the earlier version), helps Fulbank to win his Lady's hand; Phantasm then tempts a lawyer named Traverse to steal Mammon from Fulbank. Traverse succeeds in this — but then Alamode wins her from Traverse and takes Mammon to his country house. Once in the country, though, Alamode is supplanted by Maslin, who in turn is displaced by Conquest.

Meanwhile, Honoria has chosen Alworth over his competitors. She tests him, pretending she has changed her mind; and from his response, she judges him worthy of her. After the strain of the trial, however, Alworth faints, and a physician is called. The lawyer Traverse, who is tempted by Honoria's availability as well as Mammon's, masquerades as a doctor treating Alworth; he tells Honoria that Alworth is dead, and when she faints, he carries her away to his own country house. Conquest then rescues Honoria from Traverse with a band of his soldiers. Alworth shows up, in disguise; yet when he reveals himself to Honoria, Conquest recognizes him and takes him prisoner. Phantasm reveals his demon nature to Lady Mammon, and deserts her; sobered, she accepts Conquest as her husband, and he gives up Honoria to Alworth. The suitors who have lost out console themselves as best they can.

== Characters ==
- HONORIA (a fine Lady)
- AURELIA MAMMON (a wealthy Lady)
- PHANTASME (a servant to Mammon)
- COLONEL CONQUEST (a Souldier)
- ALAMODE (a Courtier)
- FULBANK (a City type)
- MASLIN (a Country type)
- ALWORTH (a Scholar)
- TRAVERS (a Lawyer)
- DASH (his Minion)
- DOCTOR
- CAPTAIN SQUANDERBAG
- SERJEANT
- MARSHALL
- GUARD
- Men
- Citizens
- Country-Men
- Souldiers
- Servants, &c.

== Performance history ==
As with the work's earlier form the Contention, no data on the stage history of Honoria and Mammon has survived. The play was never acted professionally— though it is possible that the drama may have been designed "for the schoolboys Shirley taught after the closing of the theatres" in 1642. The play eventually received its first professional production on 21 November 2013, as part of a repertory season by the Owle Schreame theatre company directed by Brice Stratford, who also took the part of Travers, at Shirley's burial site of St Giles in the Fields Church.
