= The Answer Man (novella) =

Novella by Stephen King

- Author: Stephen King
- Language: English
- Genre: Speculative fiction
- Set in: New Hampshire, United States
- Publisher: Scribner
- Publication date: May 21, 2024
- Publication place: United States
- Media type: Print (Hardcover)

The Answer Man is a novella by Stephen King, first published in King's 2024 collection You Like It Darker.

== Plot summary ==
In 1937, Phil Parker, a recent graduate from Harvard Law School, stays at his parents' summer home in the small town of Curry, New Hampshire, where he contemplates whether to work at a white-shoe law firm in Boston (where both his father and his fiancé Sally Ann's father are senior partners, but where Phil believes he will be unhappy) or instead to establish his own practice in Curry, which Phil believes will grow rapidly once the Great Depression ends. While driving along Route 111, he sees hand-painted signs advertising the "Answer Man". The signs lead to a roadside stall where Phil encounters the Answer Man, who advertises that he will answer questions for five minutes for $25 (equivalent to $560 in 2025). While assuming the Answer Man is a fraud, Phil eventually decides to pay him in an attempt to help resolve his dilemma. After the five minutes begin, the Answer Man stuns Phil by correctly giving his mother's maiden name. In response to his questions, the Answer Man tells Phil that he will marry Sally Ann, that they will live happily in Curry, that Curry will prosper, and that Phil will fight in the impending world war but emerge unscathed. After the five minutes end, Phil's vision goes black, and he awakens in his car to find the Answer Man and his stall gone.

Phil marries Sally Ann in 1938 and establishes his practice in Curry several weeks later. He builds his practice by assisting farmers who have been foreclosed upon by banks. Following the attack on Pearl Harbor and the subsequent hostilities with Japan, Phil enlists in the 22nd Marine Regiment. In 1944, by which time Phil holds the rank of lieutenant, he participates in the Battle of Eniwetok. After Japanese soldiers hidden in spider holes initiate a counterattack on the battalion command post shortly before dawn, Phil foils the counterattack by leading his troops in an attack on their rear, gunning down multiple Japanese soldiers with a Nambu light machine gun while miraculously avoiding injury. For his actions, Phil receives the Medal of Honor and returns to the U.S. to sell war bonds, meeting his three-year-old son Jacob for the first time. By 1950, Curry is growing and Phil's practice is thriving.

In 1951, Phil encounters the Answer Man for a second time while driving home from a meeting with a New Hampshire State Senator about a potential election bid. Despite the fourteen years that have passed, the Answer Man is no older, but his price has increased to $50 (equivalent to $620 in 2025) for three minutes. While speaking to the Answer Man, Phil realizes that passing students cannot see them, which the Answer Man explains is due to them being located in a "fold" of reality. After paying the Answer Man, Phil learns that he will not run for the Senate; he is disconcerted when the Answer Man tells him that Jacob will not play baseball at high school. After the three minutes end, the Answer Man's price has changed to $200 (equivalent to $2,481 in 2025) for three minutes, and Phil once again loses consciousness. In 1952, Jacob suffers a severe nosebleed and is diagnosed with acute lymphoblastic leukemia; he dies eight months later at the age of 10. A depressed Sally Ann begins drinking heavily, eventually dying in a car crash in 1960. Phil grows listless and questions whether the Answer Man was merely a figment of his imagination.

In 1964, Phil is approached by Christine Lacasse, a burn victim who wishes to sue the New England Freedom Corporation for $5,000,000 (equivalent to $51,905,000 in 2025) for faulty wiring that resulted in a house fire which killed her husband and five children. The case stirs Phil from his listlessness. He continues the lawsuit on behalf of Christine's brother after she dies of pneumonia in 1967, and in 1970 wins a final judgement of $7,400,000 (equivalent to $61,350,000 in 2025), of which Phil receives half. Phil subsequently carries out pro bono legal work until retiring, becoming a respected pillar of the community.

In 1995, a now-elderly Phil is diagnosed with a brain tumor, turning down an operation after he learns the odds of surviving are even. Later that year, Phil encounters the Answer Man for a third and final time on the outskirts of Curry. The Answer Man's appearance once again appears unchanged, but his price is now "all answers free". The Answer Man confirms to Phil that there is an afterlife, but cryptically answers "yes" when Phil presses him for details. Phil once again awakens behind the wheel of his car and drives home.

== Publication ==
King began writing The Answer Man in the Millennium Hilton New York One UN Plaza in 1977, but abandoned it after approximately six pages. In the late-2010s, King's finished and unfinished work was comprehensively archived. His nephew, John Leonard, discovered the unfinished typescript of The Answer Man amongst King's papers and convinced him to finish it. King described the process of completing The Answer Man decades after beginning it as "calling into a canyon of time and listening for the echo to come back". Bev Vincent notes commonalities between The Answer Man and King's other works Fair Extension and The Life of Chuck.

The Answer Man was finally published in 2024 as the closing tale in King's collection You Like It Darker. King dedicated the story to his nephew.

== Reception ==
Reviewing You Like It Darker for Bloody Disgusting, Jenn Adams described The Answer Man as "one of the most beautiful and upsetting stories of King's career" that questions "what is the meaning of life and what can we expect at the end of our days?" Matthew Jackson (writing for Paste) stated that The Answer Man "plays with our own attempts to lay out a clear future for the ones we love and explores how destiny warps the longer we try to stare it in the face." Eric Eisenberg described it as having "exciting highs and powerful, emotional lows". Writing for Corriere della Sera, Stefano Ferri suggested that The Answer Man was potentially the best work of King's career. Ali Karim of Shots magazine described The Answer Man as "a dark morality tale, written in a beguiling style that starts with whimsy, but soon turns nasty" and as "an EC horror styled narrative that is both incisive and thought provoking". Writing for Popzara, Trent McGee described it as "a modern fable [that] may be one of the best short stories King has ever published" and as "almost a reworking on the story of Job". Bev Vincent described "The Answer Man" as "a beautiful and poignant story that shows how a skilled writer can encapsulate a rich life in a mere fifty pages".

Writing in USA Today, Brian Truitt stated that The Answer Man "weaves together Americana and the otherwordly [...] in a surprisingly emotional telling full of small-town retro charm and palpable dread." Writing for Vulture, Neil McRobert described The Answer Man as having "a flavor of American rural gothic, as if Mark Twain had taken a stab at a fairy tale" and "the kind of otherworldly realism that King has always excelled at, but it benefits from his now senior perspective". Writing for the Star Tribune, Maren Longbella described The Answer Man as an "achingly melancholic, genie-in-a-bottle story" that "echoes many themes King has touched on over his career: nostalgia for a different time, ordinary lives intersecting with the supernatural, loss and grief", quipping "if it had included bullies and dreams, it would have been the perfect embodiment of a King story". Justin Hamelin suggested that The Answer Man "...might be one of King’s greatest works of fiction", adding "the final page of the story is equal parts devastating and sanguine". SFX described the story as "the perfect bittersweet thematic closure to [You Like It Darker], with a healthy dollop of King's trademark nostalgia."

A less positive review was received by Mike Finn, who described The Answer Man as "too abstract and too bio-pic fast".

== See also ==
- Stephen King short fiction bibliography
