= James V. Brown Library =

Public library in Williamsport, Pennsylvania

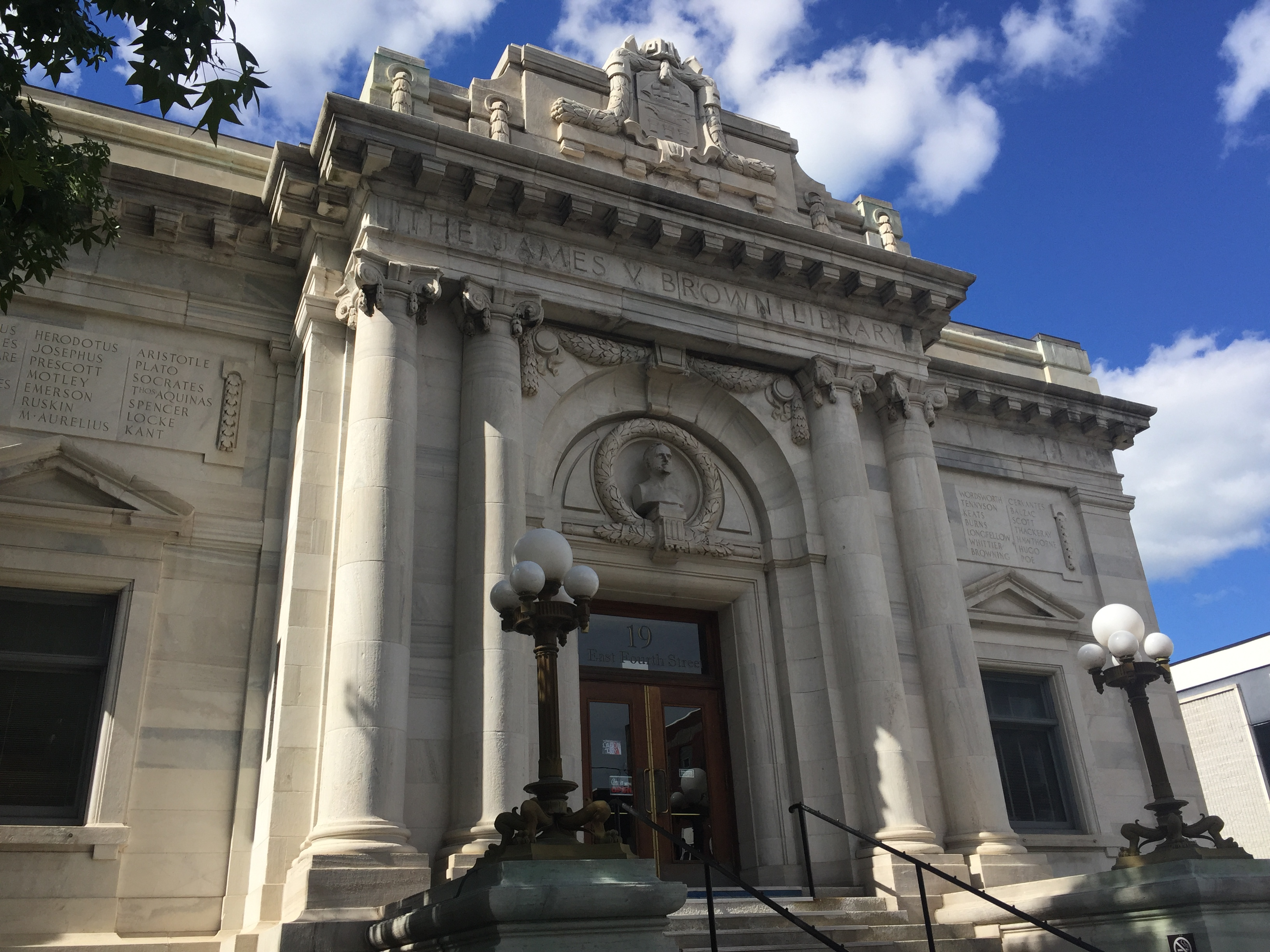
- The East Fourth Street entrance
- Location: United States
- Established: 1907
- Architect(s): Edgar V. Seeler

Other information
- Affiliation: Family Place Libraries; Libraries Transform

The James V. Brown Library is a public library in Williamsport, in Lycoming County, Pennsylvania and the headquarters of the Lycoming County Library System and the North Central Library District. The main building formally opened to the public in 1907.

== History ==
When James V. Brown died in 1904, he left a plot of land and $150,000 for the creation of a public library. This included $10,000 for the purchase of books and an endowment of $10,000 per year for other library-related purposes. The cornerstone was laid on 10 March 1906, and the library opened on 17 June 1907 with an initial holding of approximately 12,000 volumes (1,300 were in the reference room, 1,600 in the children's room and 600 in the Pennsylvania room). By noon of the first day, 150 books had been checked out.

The building was designed by Edgar V. Sealer of Philadelphia in imitation of French Renaissance architecture, and is built of white Pennsylvania marble. The entrance door is flanked by double columns; over it is a bust of the donor.

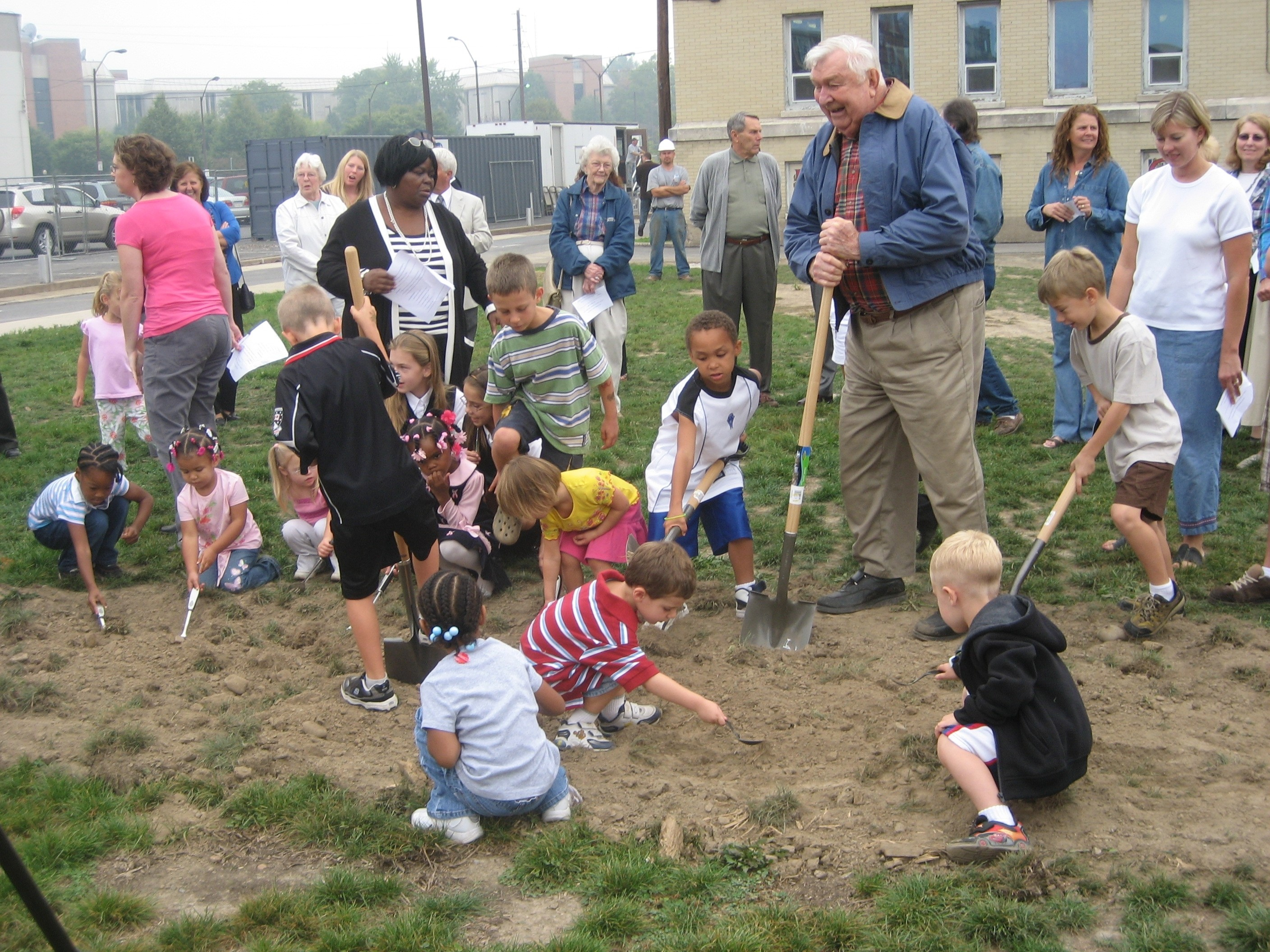
Groundbreaking for the Kathryn Siegel Welch Children's Wing

In 2008, work began on a new children's wing with 26,400 square feet (2,450 m^{2}) of floor space on three floors. This new wing, the Kathryn Siegel Welch Children's Wing, was completed in 2009 at a cost $6.5 million, of which $2 million came from a state grant.

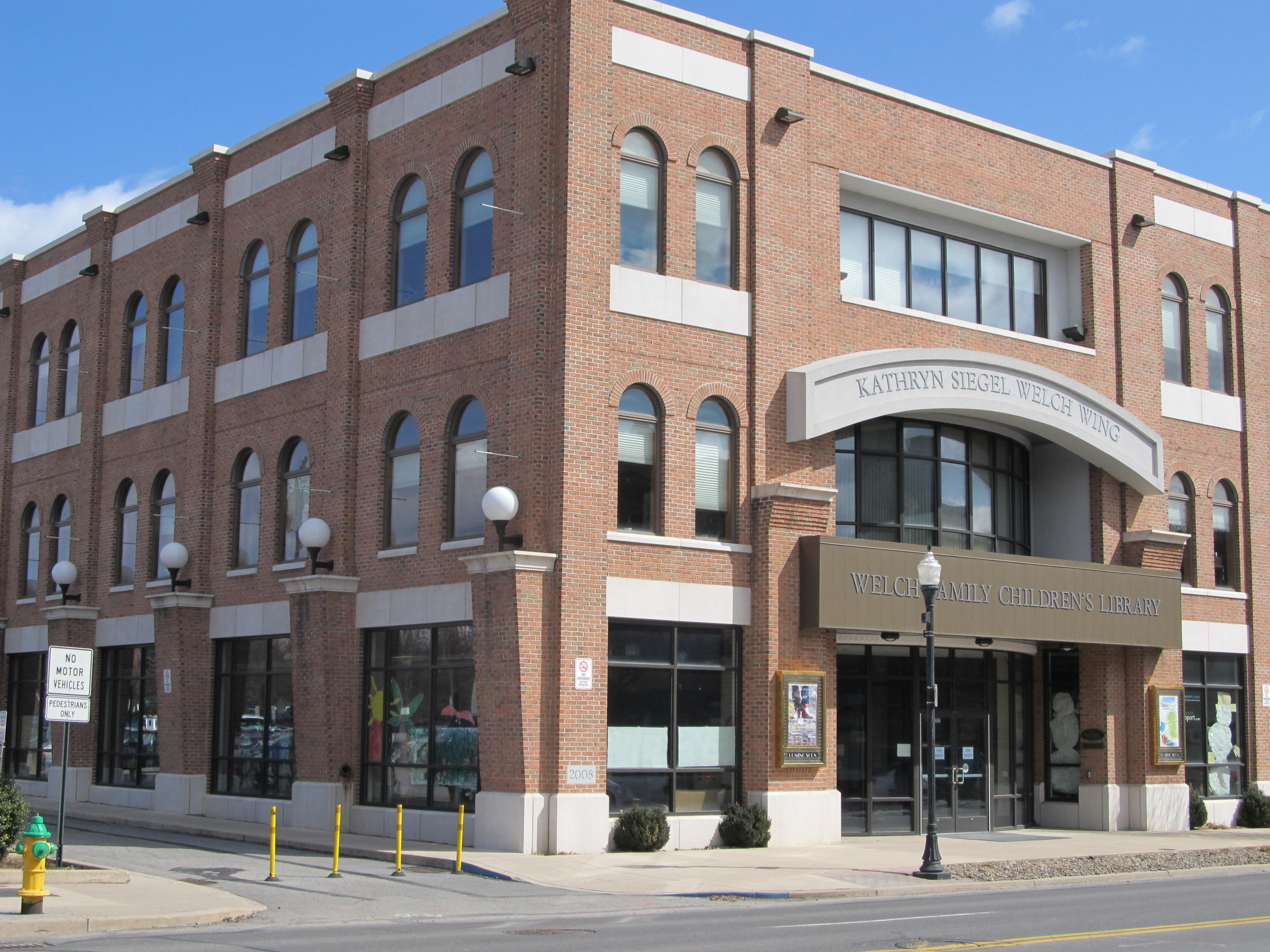
The completed Kathryn Siegel Welch Children's Wing opened in 2009

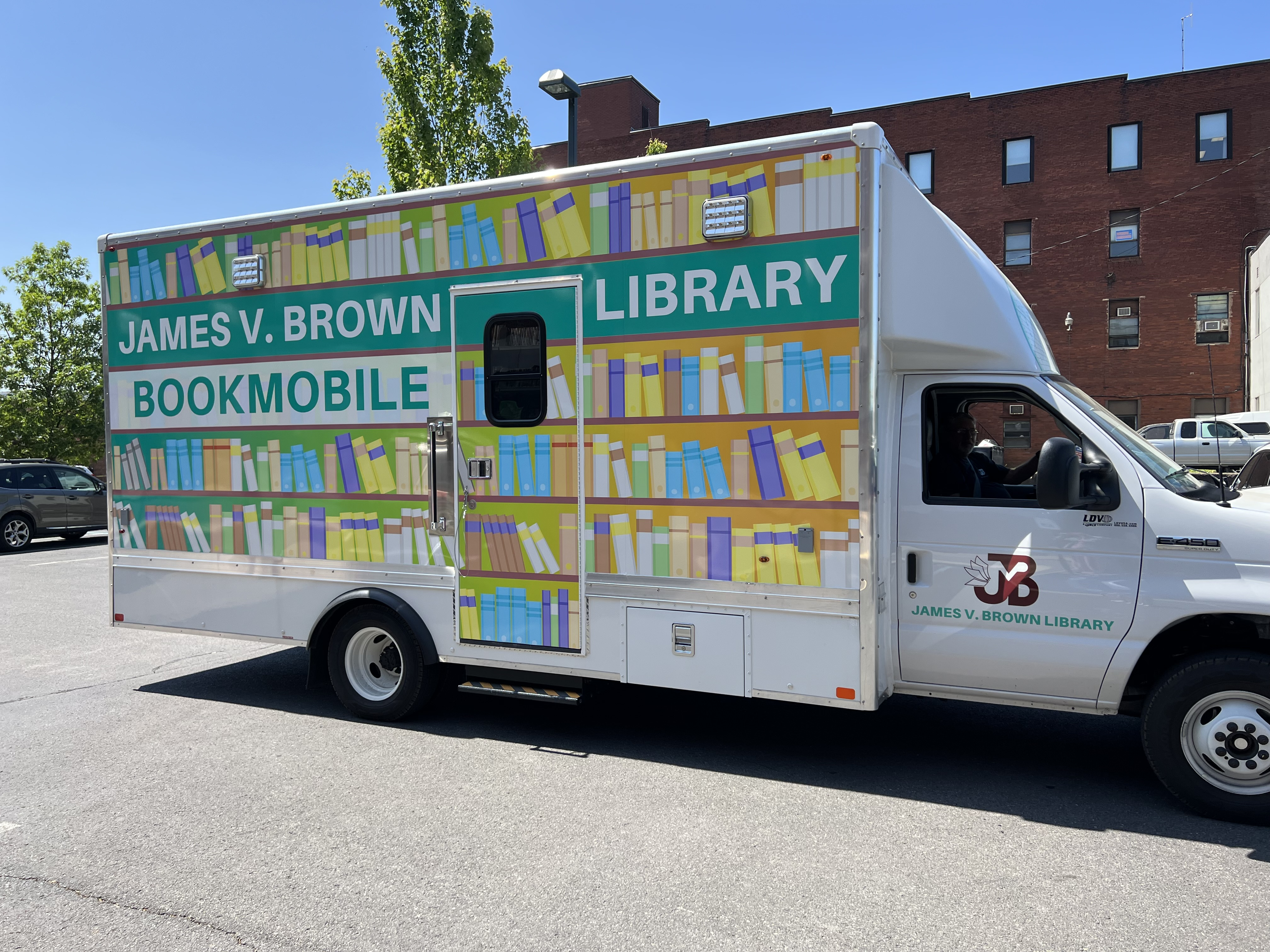
The Bookmobile.

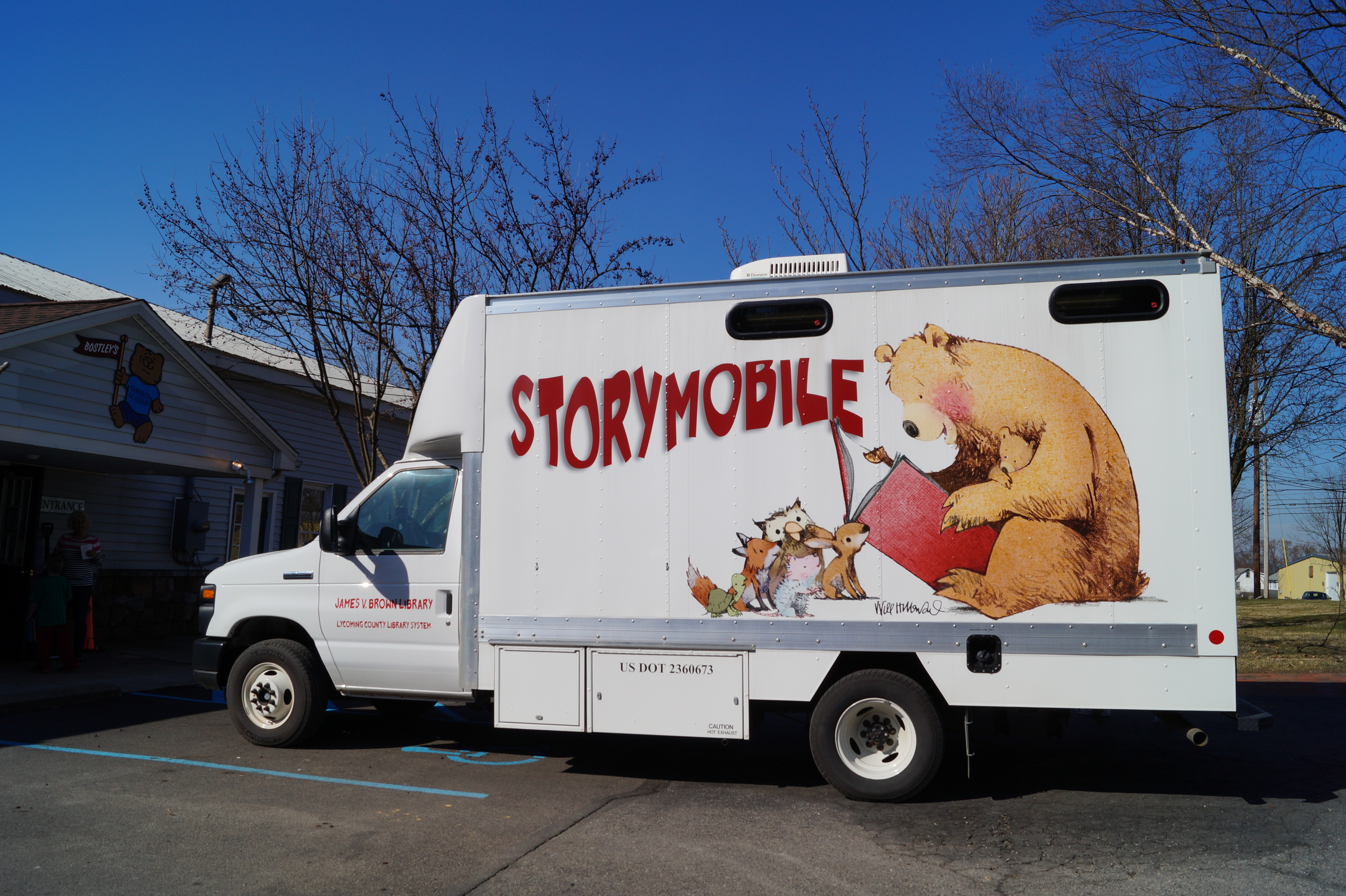
The Storymobile is an outreach vehicle that serves early childhood education facilities.

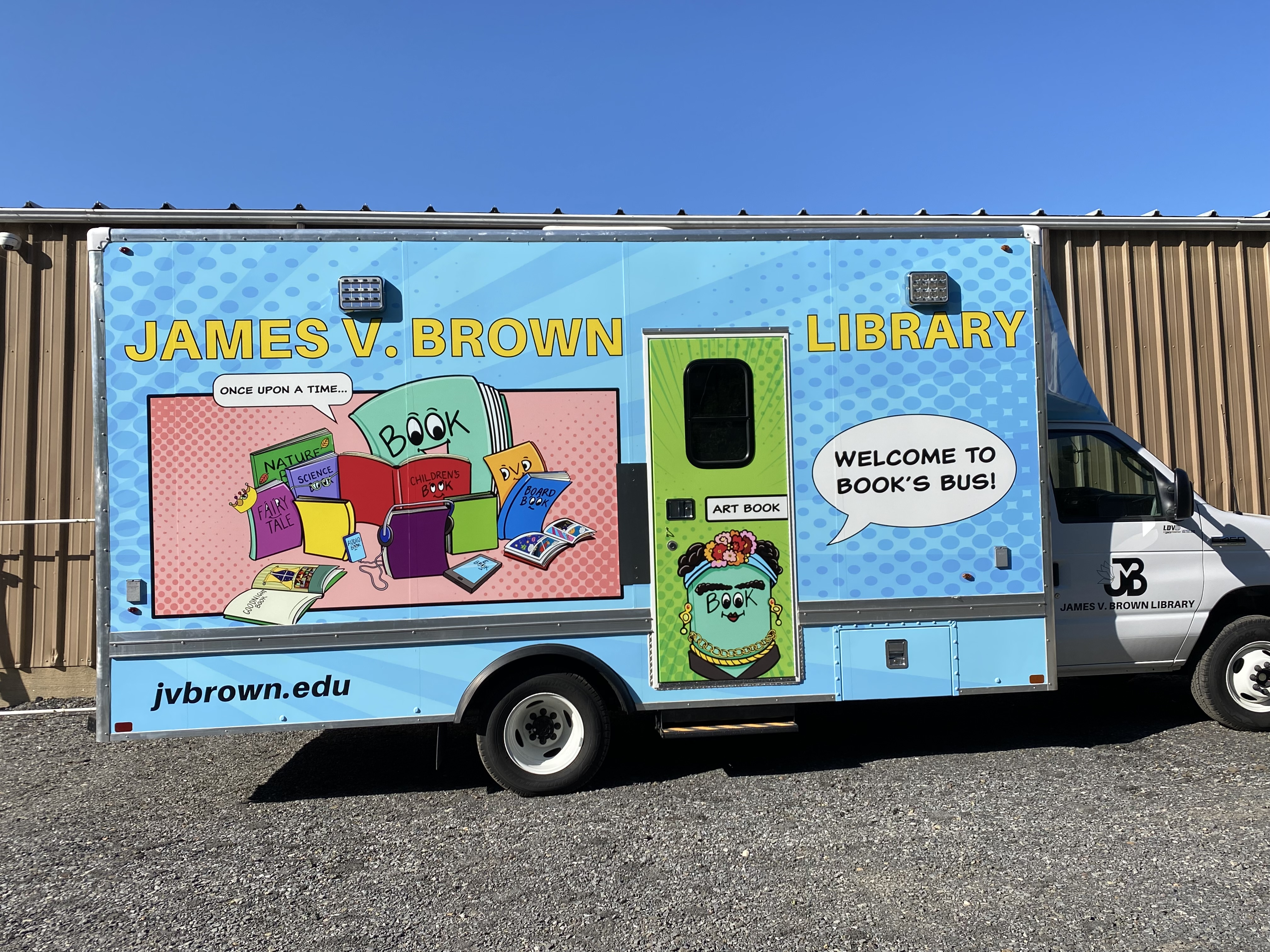
The third outreach vehicle of the James V. Brown Library, Book's Bus, debuted in June 2023.

The library operates three traveling library vehicles, the Bookmobile, Book's Bus and the Storymobile.

== Recognition ==
The library has received many "Best Practices in Early Learning" awards from the Pennsylvania Library Association for its early childhood programs.
