= Mike Heffernan =

Australian rules footballer

Personal information
- Full name: Mike Heffernan
- Born: 23 December 1939 (age 86)
- Original team: Seymour
- Height: 183 cm (6 ft 0 in)
- Weight: 84.5 kg (186 lb)

Playing career^{1}
Years	Club	Games (Goals)
1961	Collingwood	2 (0)
- ^{1} Playing statistics correct to the end of 1961.

Mike Heffernan (born 23 December 1939) is a former Australian rules footballer who played with the Collingwood in the Victorian Football League (VFL).
