= Amasis, King of Egypt =

Play by Charles Marsh

- Original language: English
- Written by: Charles Marsh
- Genre: Tragedy

Premiere
- Date: 22 September 1738
- Place: Covent Garden Theatre, London

Amasis, King of Egypt is a 1738 tragedy by the British writer Charles Marsh, about pharaoh Amasis I.

== Bibliography ==
- Nicoll, Allardyce. A History of Early Eighteenth Century Drama: 1700-1750. CUP Archive, 1927.
