= Red Screen =

Short story by Stephen King

- Short story by Stephen King
- Country: United States
- Language: English
- Genre: Horror/science fiction short story

Publication
- Publisher: Humble Bundle
- Media type: ebook
- Publication date: September 9, 2021

Chronology
Billy Summers	—

"Red Screen" is a short story by Stephen King, first published as an ebook by Humble Bundle in September 2021. It was collected in King's 2024 collection You Like It Darker.

== Plot summary ==
As he prepares for work, Frank Wilson, an NYPD homicide detective, is chided by his wife Sandi for various mistakes such as leaving the toilet seat up. Wilson reflects that Sandi has been more critical over the past six to eight months, and wonders whether she has changed or he has become more forgetful.

While driving to work, Wilson is diverted to a crime scene in Queens. Several hours later he interrogates Leonard Crocker, a plumber who has confessed to stabbing his wife Arlene to death. Crocker claims that he did not kill his wife, but rather an alien being who had stolen Arlene's body one year prior, killing her in the process. Crocker claims that Arlene was taken over by one of the frontrunners of an invasion force of "pure mind" aliens that will eventually number in the millions, telling Wilson that he learned about the invasion on the dark web.

As Wilson - believing Crocker intends to mount an insanity defense - attempts to end the interview, Crocker claims that the personalities of people taken over by the aliens change to become more irritable and critical as a means of wearing down victims, enabling them to be taken over by other aliens. Before Wilson concludes the interview, Crocker makes an oblique reference to seeing a "red screen".

Upon arriving home that evening, Wilson is again chided by Sandi. While eating a reheated dinner, he receives a call from his captain, who informs him that Crocker has killed himself at the Metropolitan Detention Center. Following the call, Sandi comforts Wilson by cooking him a fresh meal, and later that night they have sex for the first time in several weeks. After Sandi states that she needs to tell Wilson something, he suspects that she will ask for a divorce. Instead, she tells him that her irritable behavior over the last few months has been due to premature menopause. As the couple prepare to go to sleep, the screen of Wilson's cell phone momentarily flashes red, and Sandi smiles in the dark.

== Publication ==
"Red Screen" was inspired by Invasion of the Body Snatchers and similar works. As recounted by King, "the first paragraphs of 'Red Screen' and 'Finn' existed weeks and months before I actually put them down. I could see every period and comma."

"Red Screen" was originally published as a limited edition ebook by Humble Bundle in September 2021. The proceeds from sales of the story were donated to the American Civil Liberties Union (ACLU), a charity selected by King. It was the first "Humble Exclusive" story. The story was originally released on a "pay what you want" basis with a minimum price of $5 USD (equivalent to $6 in 2025) for a period of one week. The limited release was purchased 19,264 times, raising $149,772 (equivalent to $177,950 in 2025) for the ACLU. Ian Carlos Campbell noted King's collaboration with Humble Bundle as the latest example of King's "history of tinkering with different release strategies", similar to the publication of Ur as an exclusive to the Amazon Kindle 2 in 2009. Similarly, Emily Burnham of the Bangor Daily News noted that "King has often been ahead of the curve when it comes to releasing his works in different formats", referencing the success of the ebook Riding the Bullet in 2000 and its impact on digital publishing.

In 2024, "Red Screen" was collected in King's book You Like It Darker.

== Reception ==
Reviewing You Like It Darker for Bloody Disgusting, Jenn Adams described "Red Screen" and "Finn" as two of the less developed stories in the collection, stating that each "present[s] ominous ideas, but offer[s] little more than snapshots of larger terror". Also reviewing You Like It Darker, Ali Karim of Shots magazine described "Red Screen" as "less engaging [...] little more than a shrug." Kirkus Reviews described "Red Screen" as a "misstep", while SFX described it as "half-formed".

A more positive review was offered by Mike Finn, who described it as "a fast, clever, Twilight Zone-style take on what the red screens that have appeared on some iPhones really mean", and by Eoghan O'Sullivan (writing for the Irish Examiner), who described it as "a particularly chilling reveal, the layers slowly peeling away and then just when you think you've found the centre, there's one more jump to come". Sassan Niasseri (writing for Rolling Stone) interpreted the story as having feminist themes, suggesting that "King is very clever here [...] if men knew their wife's body and mind better, they wouldn't have to believe in conspiracy theories in which she is a monster".

Reviewing You Like It Darker, Justin Hamelin suggested that "'The Turbulence Expert' and 'Red Screen' would make for nice Creepshow episodes, with no overt gruesome horror but plenty of weird vibes."

== See also ==
- Stephen King short fiction bibliography
