= Margrethe Lasson =

Danish novelist

Anna Margrethe Lasson (March 1659 – March 1738) was a Danish novelist, the first novelist in Denmark.

She was born in Copenhagen, Denmark. Her Parents were Jens Lassen (1625–1706), was a High Court judge on the island of Fyn, and Margrethe Christensdatter Lund. She grew up in the parish of Dalum. In 1662 her father purchased the manor of Dalum Kloster. In 1680, however, Jens Lassen was convicted of treason against the Crown and had to repay a large debt. Left destitute after her father's death in 1706, she lived in poverty with a sister at Priorgården in Odense. Their home was sold at auction but they were allowed to live there to their deaths.

Lasson was the author of a baroque tribute poem to the Norwegian poet Dorothe Engelbretsdatter (1634–1716), whom she defended and admired. In 1715, she wrote the novel Den beklædte Sandhed, which was published in 1723 and became the first novel in Denmark. Her pseudonym was “det danske Sprogs inderlige Elskerinde Aminda”. Her writing was inspired by French writer Madeleine de Scudéry (1607–1701). She died in Odense.

== Sources ==
- Lotte Thrane. "Margrethe Lasson" Dansk Kvindebiografisk Leksikon
