= Brice Stratford =

English theatre director and writer

- Born: February 1987 (age 39)
- Occupations: Theatre director, actor, writer
- Organization: Owle Schreame theatre company

Brice Stratford (born February 1987) is an English director, writer, and actor-manager. He has focused on classical theatre, the New Forest area of Southern England, and British folklore and mythology. He founded the Owle Schreame theatre company, which focused on Renaissance plays. He has written two books on British mythology.

== Career ==
=== Theatre ===
Stratford founded the Owle Schreame theatre company, which specialized in Mediaeval and Renaissance theatre, in Cambridge in 2008. In 2013 at St Giles-in-the-Fields in Camden he produced, directed and performed in the company's The Unfortunate Mother (1640) by Thomas Nabbes, Honoria and Mammon (1659) by James Shirley and Bussy D'Ambois (1607) by George Chapman; the three authors had all been interred in the churchyard, and two of the plays (Honoria and Mammon and The Unfortunate Mother) had apparently never previously been performed. In 2016 the company revived three Interregnum Droll plays at the Edinburgh Festival Fringe, and later produced other drolls – performing a selection of Mummers plays at the Old Red Lion Theatre in 2017 and reviving the obscure 1660 droll version of A Midsummer Night's Dream at the Edinburgh Festival Fringe in 2018.

In 2013, via online public vote, Stratford received the award for the People's Favourite Male Performance at The Offies for his 2012 performance as Lord Chamberlain in Ondine at The White Bear Theatre.

In 2014 he held the Owle Schreame Awards, which were for innovation in classical theatre.

In December 2017 he founded The Owle Schreame Theatre Company Limited in Lyndhurst, Hampshire in the New Forest; the company was dissolved in January 2020.

=== Historical research ===
In 2017, while researching the history of Glasshayes House in Lyndhurst, Stratford discovered sketches in the Richard Lancelyn Green archive which indicated that Arthur Conan Doyle had been the architect of the 1912 redesign of the building, apparently as an example of Spiritualist architecture.

Stratford has written two books, both published in 2022. New Forest Myths and Folklore, concerning the New Forest area of Southern England, was published by The History Press. Anglo-Saxon Myths: The Struggle for the Seven Kingdoms, a collection of stories from the Anglo-Saxon period, was published by Batsford Books.
