= Castle Rock (Stephen King) =

Part of Stephen King's fictional Maine

- Stephen King location
- Aerial view of Orange, Massachusetts, as the town as pictured in the Castle Rock TV series
- First appearance: The Dead Zone (1979)
- Created by: Stephen King
- Genre: Horror fiction

In-universe information
- Type: Town in Maine

Castle Rock (sometimes referred to as the Rock) is a fictional town appearing in Stephen King's fictional Maine topography, providing the setting for a number of his novels, novellas, and short stories. Castle Rock first appeared in King's 1979 novel The Dead Zone and has since been referred to or used as the primary setting in many other works by King. The nearby fictional Shawshank State Prison is also featured in several of King's works and is often associated with Castle Rock.

As a native of Durham, Maine, King was inspired by his hometown when creating Castle Rock. The town name is taken from the fictional mountain fort in William Golding's 1954 novel Lord of the Flies.

Other notable fictional towns that King has used as the central setting in more than one work include Derry and Jerusalem's Lot.

== Population and geographical location ==
The population of Castle Rock was 1,280 by 1959 and around 1,500 in Needful Things. According to the book cover, Needful Things was "The Last Castle Rock Story". However, the town later served as the setting for the short story "It Grows on You", published in King's 1993 collection Nightmares & Dreamscapes. This story, according to King, serves as an epilogue to Needful Things.

In Needful Things, Castle Rock is placed 18 miles (29 km) southwest of South Paris. In The Body, Harlow is 30 miles (48 km) east of Castle Rock. In the anthology film Creepshow (1982), written by King, a sign at the end of "The Lonesome Death of Jordy Verrill" puts Portland at 37 miles, and Boston at 188 miles. "Weeds", the 1976 short story on which "The Lonesome Death of Jordy Verrill" was based, was set in New Hampshire.

Geographically, this puts Castle Rock within 37 miles of Portland, Maine. This region could include real places such as Durham, Lisbon, Danville, Auburn, Lewiston, Bridgton, and maybe even Sabattus.

In the short story "Mrs. Todd's Shortcut", Castle Rock is described as being 79 miles from Bangor, Maine as the crow flies, with the most common driving route being 156.4 miles: Route 97 to Mechanic Falls, then Route 11 to Lewiston, and then the Interstate to Bangor.

A map on King's official website places Castle Rock in Oxford County, in the vicinity of Woodstock. The works in which Castle Rock appears place the town in the fictional "Castle County", which also includes such fictional towns as Castle Lake, Castle View, and Harlow. The location of Castle Rock has been linked to Marblehead, which has a park by the same name.

Part of the Castle Rock area is underlain by limestone. It makes the water hard and hosts at least one bat-infested cave unknown to the inhabitants, as noted in Cujo.

Besides Castle Rock and the oft-used Derry and Jerusalem's Lot, King has created other fictional Maine towns. These include Chamberlain in Carrie; Chester's Mill in Under the Dome; Haven in The Tommyknockers; Little Tall Island in Dolores Claiborne and Storm of the Century; Harlow in Revival; Tarkers Mills in Cycle of the Werewolf, and Ludlow (unrelated to the real Maine town of Ludlow) in Pet Sematary and The Dark Half.

== Characters of Castle Rock ==
=== George Bannerman ===
George Bannerman is the sheriff of Castle Rock, appearing in The Dead Zone, Cujo, and The Body. In The Dead Zone, Bannerman, after years of failing to catch the local serial killer the Castle Rock Strangler, approaches Johnny Smith to help catch the Strangler. Bannerman is horrified to learn the Strangler is, in reality, Deputy Frank Dodd, whom he viewed as a surrogate son. The two men corner Dodd in his house, where he commits suicide.

In Cujo, Bannerman helps organize the search for Donna and Tad Trenton, who are currently missing, and unbeknownst to anyone, trapped at the Camber house by the titular rabid Saint Bernard. Suspicious when there are no leads to their location and inspired by his previous investigation with Smith and the Dodd case, Bannerman checks at the Camber house and discovers Donna and Tad. Before he can phone in this discovery, Cujo appears and viciously mauls and disembowels him.

Bannerman was portrayed by Tom Skerritt in The Dead Zone and Sandy Ward in Cujo. In the television adaptation of The Dead Zone, Bannerman is merged with the character of Walt Hazlett to form the character Sheriff Walt Bannerman, portrayed by Chris Bruno.

=== Joe Camber ===
Appeared in the novel Cujo (1981) and portrayed by Ed Lauter in the film adaptation of the same name (1983), Joe is an alcoholic, controlling man who frequently abuses his wife Charity and is generally hostile to everyone around him; the only two exceptions are his son Brett and his friend Gary Pervier. The townspeople are aware of his hard drinking but consider him a competent, honest mechanic. Joe is mauled to death by his own dog, Cujo, once he becomes rabid.

=== Alan Pangborn ===
Alan Pangborn appears in the novel The Dark Half (1989), the novella "The Sun Dog" (1990), and the novel Needful Things (1991). He is also a primary character in the Castle Rock television series based on King's novels. In The Dark Half, Pangborn is introduced as the sheriff of the town Castle Rock. He has a wife Annie and two children, Toby ("Al") and Todd. The story establishes that Pangborn has a penchant for magic tricks. Pangborn re-appears again as the main protagonist of Needful Things, which establishes him as a widower dating Polly Chalmers. The story reveals that Annie and Todd died in a car crash soon after the events of The Dark Half. Pangborn was portrayed by Michael Rooker in the film adaptation of The Dark Half and Ed Harris in the film Needful Things, both released in 1993. Alan and Polly are also briefly mentioned in Bag of Bones (1998) in a conversation between author Michael Noonan and the then-Castle County Sheriff Norris Ridgewick. Ridgewick mentions they are "doing real well" after having relocated to New Hampshire, though Polly still has arthritis.

In the television series Castle Rock, which features an original story set around established Stephen King characters and stories, Alan Pangborn worked as town sheriff in the 1980s and 1990s, but is now retired. He is in a romantic relationship with town resident Ruth Deaver and has pursued her since at least 1990. He is said to be a widower and shown to have an interest in magic and sleight of hand, but no mention is made in regards to Polly ever being in his life. The show and its characters regularly discuss the town's history, but do not ever reference the destruction the town suffered in Needful Things, suggesting the main events of that novel did not happen in the continuity of the show, and this version of Pangborn never met Polly. The younger Pangborn of the 1980 and 90s is portrayed by actor Jeffrey Pierce while the Pangborn of 2018 is portrayed by Scott Glenn.

=== Ace Merrill ===
John "Ace" Merrill is a psychopathic, cruel bully who appears in "The Body", "The Sun Dog", "Nona", and Needful Things. In "The Body", Ace leads a gang of bullies who torment Gordie Lachance, Chris Chambers, Teddy Duchamp, and Vern Tessio. He later attempts to murder them after they find Ray Browers' body, so that Ace and his gang will get the credit. Chris scares Ace and his gang off by threatening them with a handgun. As an adult, Gordie sees that Ace has become an alcoholic, overweight millworker and takes pleasure in seeing his tormentor so miserable.

By the time of "The Sun Dog", Ace has been sent to Shawshank State Penitentiary and disowned by his only remaining family, his uncle Pop Merrill. In Needful Things, Ace returns to his hometown, on the run to avoid being murdered by two drug dealers over unpaid debts. Ace holds a grudge against Sheriff Alan Pangborn for having arrested him. Ace becomes the right-hand man of Leland Gaunt, a demon who provides Ace with cocaine and the implications of buried treasure in exchange for procuring guns for him. In the novel's climax, Ace and Buster Keeton team up at Gaunt's behest to wreak havoc. Merrill holds Pangborn's girlfriend Polly Chalmers at gunpoint when Gaunt and Pangborn confront each other, only to be shot in the head by Norris.

Merrill is played by Kiefer Sutherland in Stand by Me and Paul Sparks in the television series Castle Rock.

=== Pop Merrill ===
Reginald Marion "Pop" Merrill is a loan shark and the owner of the Emporium Galorium, a local junk store, who appears in "The Sun Dog" and is mentioned in Needful Things. Pop is a greedy, cruel, and miserly man, who often scams his customers and is disliked by the rest of the town. In spite of this, Pop is extremely wealthy and well-connected and serves a variety of clients, from desperate people he takes advantage of to renowned billionaires. In "The Sun Dog", Kevin Delevan takes his haunted Sun 660 Polaroid camera (which only produces photos of a malevolent dog standing in front of a white picket fence that becomes increasingly monstrous as more photos are taken with it) to Pop, who is unable to uncover anything wrong with the camera. Kevin and his father John (who had previously been the victim of Pop's outrageous interest rates) resolve to destroy the camera, but Pop, sensing the opportunity for money, swaps the camera with another Sun 660 and keeps the haunted one. All of Pop's clients balk at it, either believing it to be a fraud or being overcome with dread when they see it. The dog also begins to gradually drive him mad, allowing it to take control of him and force him to take photos on the Sun 660, which Pop believes to be a broken cuckoo clock he is repairing. Kevin and John, who had caught on to Pop's scam, attempt to stop him from releasing the dog, but they are too late; the dog breaks free, causing molten plastic to slice Pop's throat open. The dog is trapped once again by Kevin, and the Emporium burns down. Needful Things shows that the reason for Pop's death is unknown to the general public, though everyone, even his nephew Ace Merrill, is happy that he is dead. Gaunt later convinces Ace that Pop had buried part of his fortune to gain his assistance and cause a feud between him and Sheriff Pangborn.

Pop was portrayed by Tim Robbins in the television series Castle Rock.

=== Gary Pervier ===
Gary Pervier is the closest neighbor to Joe Camber, and a local WWII veteran and alcoholic, who appears in Cujo. During WWII, Gary charged a German machine gun nest before retreating his squadron to safety. Gary wins a DSC award afterwards for this event. In the summer of 1980, Gary is living just outside of Castle Rock in a dilapidated house. Gary's best friend is his neighbor, Joe Camber. After Joe's wife Charity wins a large sum of lottery money, Joe convinces Gary to go on a trip with him down to Boston while Charity and Joe's son Brett are visiting Charity's sister in Connecticut. On the morning they are supposed to leave for Boston, Joe's rabid Saint Bernard Cujo attacks Gary while he is going through a hangover in his yard. Cujo bites Gary on the shoulder before he can kick the dog away. Gary runs into his house to get his shotgun, but Cujo breaks through the screen door and charges at Gary, ripping his throat out.

Gary was portrayed by Mills Watson in Cujo (film).

=== Kevin Delevan ===
Kevin Delevan is a local teenager who appears in "The Sun Dog". On his 15th birthday, Kevin receives a Sun 660 Polaroid camera as a gift. The camera quickly proves to be supernatural in nature, as it only produces photographs of a malevolent dog in front of a white picket fence, that becomes closer to the photograph and increasingly monstrous as more photos are taken with the camera. For lack of a better option, Kevin takes the camera to Pop Merrill, and both quickly conclude that the camera is haunted. Kevin's father John learns about this, as well, and the two decide to destroy the camera; however, Pop swaps the camera with another Sun 660. Kevin experiences psychic dreams where he enters "Polaroidville", an odd dimension that exists within photographs; Kevin comes to the conclusion that the dog is a predator from Polaroidsville that sees the real world as a new hunting ground, and that he is receiving the messages from Polaroidsville's "dogcatcher", who, through cryptic clues, reveals to Kevin that the only way to stop the dog is to take another photo of it and that Pop kept the camera. John and Kevin go to stop Pop from freeing the dog, but are too late; the dog breaks loose and kills Merrill, but Kevin is able to trap it within another Sun 660. A year later, on his 16th birthday, Kevin is given a computer as a gift. When he turns it on, he receives a message from the dog, which reveals that the dog is loose again and is eager to get revenge against Kevin.

=== Frank Dodd ===
Frank Dodd is a deputy serving under Sheriff George Bannerman, while also moonlighting as the Castle Rock Strangler, a serial killer who rapes and murders women, who appears in The Dead Zone novel, and is referenced in almost all stories set in Castle Rock. Dodd uses his involvement in the investigation to keep track of its progress and avoid capture. Dodd murders six women and girls from 1970 to 1975. Dodd's first victim is a young waitress whom he rapes and strangles in the Castle Rock town common. After Dodd murders a nine-year-old girl, who is found in the same location as his first victim, Bannerman brings in psychic Johnny Smith to assist in the investigation. Smith discovers Dodd is the killer, and Bannerman and Smith corner Dodd in his home, where he commits suicide and writes "I CONFESS" in lipstick on his neck. By the time of Cujo, Frank has become a local boogeyman to the children of Castle Rock. Tad Trenton's closet is haunted by a malevolent spirit that claims to be Dodd's ghost and threatens to murder the boy. The ghost later appears before the boy's father Vic while he sits in Tad's room. When Cujo attacks Sheriff George Bannerman, he imagines that the dog is possessed by the ghost of Dodd, and mentally inquires if he came back because Hell was too hot for him.

Dodd is portrayed by Nicholas Campbell in The Dead Zone film and by Michael Rogers in the television series.

=== Cujo ===
Cujo is a Saint Bernard owned by the Camber family and the titular character of Cujo, and is referenced in several of King's other works. Cujo is initially a playful dog that is friendly to every person he meets, although rabbits drive him wild. One day he chases a rabbit into a cave and is bitten by a rabid bat. No one notes much significance to the wound, but as it festers Cujo becomes depressed and occasionally ill-tempered (people think he's just bothered by the summer heat or, as observed by two delivery men, "going bad"), then goes mad. He becomes convinced that humans are responsible for his pain, and this prompts him to go on a murderous rampage. After murdering Joe Camber and Gary Pervier, Cujo traps Donna and Tad Trenton inside their broken-down car after they come for auto repairs. Cujo refuses to allow them to leave, and continually tries to break in and kill them. When Donna leaves the car to escape, Cujo bites her repeatedly, though she manages to evade death, and Cujo continues to keep a watchful eye over the car. Eventually, Sheriff George Bannerman arrives and attempts to phone in his discovery of the two, only for Cujo to disembowel him. Donna impales him in the eye with a broken baseball bat, killing him. In Needful Things, Polly Chalmers, while at the now-abandoned Camber home, encounters Cujo's malevolent and restless spirit, which chases her out of the farm.

=== Norris Ridgewick ===
Norris Ridgewick is a deputy sheriff of Castle County, who served under Alan Pangborn and later succeeded him as sheriff. Ridgewick serves a minor role in The Dark Half as comic relief. He reappears as a main character in Needful Things, being one of those manipulated by Leland Gaunt into helping him drive the town into chaos. After realizing his part in it, Ridgewick initially attempts suicide, but instead decides to help restore order and plays a crucial part in stopping Gaunt. Ridgewick was portrayed by Zachary Mott in The Dark Half, Ray McKinnon in Needful Things, and Timothy John Smith in the television series Castle Rock. He also makes a brief appearance in Bag of Bones and is a secondary character in both Gwendy's Magic Feather and Gwendy's Final Task. His arrest of Raymond Andrew Joubert is described in Gerald's Game.

=== Polly Chalmers ===
Polly Chalmers is a local eccentric and Alan Pangborn's girlfriend, who appears in The Dark Half and Needful Things. She is portrayed by Bonnie Bedelia in the 1993 film adaptation of the same name.

=== Buster Keeton ===
Danforth "Buster" Keeton is the cruel, hot-tempered, and mentally unstable town selectman, who appears in The Dark Half and Needful Things. Keeton plays a prominent role in Needful Things, where Gaunt's manipulations and exploitation of his instability and gambling debts to drive him into madness and convince Keeton to become his assistant. He is played by JT Walsh in Needful Things.

=== Leland Gaunt ===
Leland Gaunt is a demon who serves as the primary antagonist of Needful Things. He arrives and serves as the proprietor of the titular shop, making people pull pranks on others in exchange for worthless items; these pranks inevitably lead to someone's death, and he is eventually revealed to have been wandering the earth for centuries, collecting the souls of his unwitting customers. He recruits Buster Keeton and Ace Merrill, who aid in his efforts. At the end of the novel, Pangborn frees the souls Gaunt collected and forces him out of Castle Rock. The epilogue reveals he has set up a new shop in Junction City, Iowa, to begin the cycle anew. He is portrayed by Max Von Sydow in the 1993 adaption of Needful Things.

=== Thad Beaumont ===
Thad Beaumont is an author and the main protagonist of The Dark Half. Thad specializes primarily in writing cerebral fiction, but writes gritty and hyperviolent crime novels under the pseudonym George Stark to support his family. Thad retires the pseudonym after being discovered and subsequently blackmailed by Fred Clawson, jokingly declaring Stark dead. Stark returns, now inhabited by the spirit of Thad's twin whom he absorbed in utero, and goes on a killing spree of everyone involved in his "death". Though Stark is eventually killed, Thad's wife leaves him and takes the kids after realizing Thad liked Stark's violent nature on some level. Thad makes a brief appearance in Needful Things, having descended into alcoholism and occasionally calling Pangborn. He is mentioned to have committed suicide in Bag of Bones. He is portrayed by Timothy Hutton (in a duel role to George Stark) in the 1993 Dark Half film adaptation.

=== Andy Clutterbuck ===
Andy Clutterbuck is a deputy sheriff of Castle County who served under Alan Pangborn. In both The Dark Half and Needful Things, he plays a minor role, assisting in Pangborn's investigations. His wife is killed in the climax of Needful Things, and Clutterbuck is left grief-stricken; he succumbs to alcoholism and eventually commits suicide. Following Needful Things, Clutterbuck has appeared again in Lisey's Story and as police chief in Drunken Fireworks in 2015.

== Shawshank State Prison ==
Shawshank State Prison
- Stephen King location
- Prison as pictured in film adaptation
- First appearance: Rita Hayworth and Shawshank Redemption (1982)
- Created by: Stephen King
- Genre: Crime fiction

In-universe information
- Type: Prison

Shawshank State Prison is a fictional New England state prison in the state of Maine. It serves as the primary location in the novella Rita Hayworth and Shawshank Redemption by Stephen King, as well as the film adaptation. The prison has also been mentioned in several other works by or related to King.

Shawshank State Prison first appeared in Stephen King's novella entitled Rita Hayworth and Shawshank Redemption. The story was originally published in the 1982 short story collection Different Seasons alongside three other novellas, two of which also referenced the prison.

The Shawshank Redemption, a motion picture based on the novella, was released in 1994. The actual building used for filming was the Ohio State Reformatory in Mansfield, Ohio.

Shawshank State Prison also appears in several episodes of the Hulu original series Castle Rock. For the series, the showrunners used the West Virginia Penitentiary as the prison. "Part of the reason we chose the prison that we chose to shoot at was we loved the idea that there are houses literally in the shadow of the prison," said showrunner Sam Shaw. "It's pretty different from the amazing prison in Ohio that they shot for the movie, which stands alone."

== Literary works set in Castle Rock ==
Publication year	Title	Notes
1979	The Dead Zone	Protagonist Johnny Smith travels to Castle Rock to assist the police in tracking a serial killer.
1981	Cujo	The lives of two Castle Rock families are changed after the eponymous St. Bernard becomes rabid.
1982	The Body	During the summer of 1960, four young Castle Rock boys set out "on a quest" to find the body of a boy who has gone missing from a neighboring town and is now presumed dead. The novella was originally published in the collection Different Seasons.
1983	"Uncle Otto's Truck"	Short story collected in Skeleton Crew (1985).
1984	"Mrs. Todd's Shortcut"	Short story collected in Skeleton Crew (1985).
1985	"Gramma"	First published in Weirdbook magazine in 1984, the short story was revised and collected a year later in Skeleton Crew. The story takes place in a Castle Rock home, where a young boy is left home alone to keep tabs on his bedridden grandmother.
1985	"Nona"	First published in the 1978 anthology Shadows, the short story was later revised and collected in the 1985 collection Skeleton Crew. Castle Rock became a setting in the 1985 version of the story, replacing the fictional and geographically similar Blainesville, Maine.
1989	The Dark Half	Introduction of Sheriff Alan Pangborn, who appears in the next two stories.
1990	The Sun Dog	Novella from Four Past Midnight.
1991	Needful Things	Leland Gaunt opens a shop in Castle Rock. His manipulations provoke violence and death, and the novel ends with several buildings and town blocks of Castle Rock on fire or destroyed. The book cover advertised this as "The Last Castle Rock Story".
1993	"It Grows on You"	Originally published in Marshroots in the 1973 fall issue, "It Grows on You" was later revised in the August 1982 publication of Whispers and again for the 1993 short story collection Nightmares & Dreamscapes. It's in this latter publication that Castle Rock was made part of the short story, as its events revolve around a house located in the town. This has been called an "epilogue" to Needful Things.
2009	"Premium Harmony"	Short story collected in The Bazaar of Bad Dreams (2015).
2015	Drunken Fireworks	Novella collected in The Bazaar of Bad Dreams (2015).
2017	Gwendy's Button Box	Novella written with Richard Chizmar.
2018	Elevation	The novella follows a Castle Rock resident, who rapidly loses weight without any physical signs of weight loss.
2019	Gwendy's Magic Feather	Novel written by Richard Chizmar, as a follow-up to Chizmar and King's novella "Gwendy's Button Box".
2024	Two Talented Bastids	The novella is partly set in Castle Rock and the surrounding county.

== Works that refer to Castle Rock ==
Publication year	Title	Notes
1982	Rita Hayworth and Shawshank Redemption	Narrator Red recounts Castle Rock as the town he lived in before his incarceration at Shawshank. The novella was originally published in the collection Different Seasons.
1983	Pet Sematary	Refers to the events of Cujo which take place in Castle Rock.
1986	It	Beverly Marsh alludes to serial murderer Frank Dodd as "that crazy cop [who] killed all those women in Castle Rock."
1990	The Stand	Originally published in 1978, The Stand was later reissued in 1990 with missing material reinstated and revised. In this Complete and Uncut Edition, Castle Rock is mentioned as being part of the Lakes Region of Maine.
1992	Gerald's Game	The climactic events of Needful Things that took place in Castle Rock are mentioned as having taken place a year prior.
1993	One on One	Novel written by Tabitha King, the wife of Stephen King. Castle Rock is mentioned as a sports rival to Greenspark, the primary setting of the novel. In an afterword, she thanks "another novelist who was kind enough to allow me" to borrow the name.
1994	The Stand	Television miniseries with teleplay written by Stephen King.
1994	"The Man in the Black Suit"	Short story that appears in Everything's Eventual.
1998	Bag of Bones	Castle Rock is mentioned significantly, along with Derry, Maine.
1999	The Girl Who Loved Tom Gordon	The protagonist, Trisha McFarland, listens to the exploits of her hero, baseball player Tom Gordon, on her Walkman on the WCAS Castle Rock radio station.
2000	"Riding the Bullet"	
2001	Dreamcatcher	Refers to the Castle Rock radio station.
2004	Kingdom Hospital	Television series developed by Stephen King.
2006	Lisey's Story	
2008	"N."	Short story that appears in Just After Sunset.
2009	Under the Dome	Chester's Mill is mentioned as being close to Castle Rock and the road leading to it is shown on the town map in the novel's preface.
2010	A Good Marriage	Novella published in the collection Full Dark, No Stars.
2011	11/22/63	
2013	Doctor Sleep	
2014	Revival	
2019	"Squad D"	Short story published in the 2018 anthology Shivers 8.
2020	Mr Harrigan's Phone	Novella published in the collection "If It Bleeds". Craig stated his father took him to dinner in Castle Rock when celebrating being awarded Salesman of the Month.

=== Shawshank State Prison ===
Publication year	Title	Notes
1982	Apt Pupil	The novella was originally published in the collection Different Seasons. The story appears alongside Rita Hayworth and Shawshank Redemption.
1982	The Body	The novella was originally published in the collection Different Seasons. The story appears alongside Rita Hayworth and Shawshank Redemption.
1985	Nona	Published in Skeleton Crew.
1985	The Trap	Novel published by Tabitha King, Stephen King's wife.
1986	It	One of the missing children's stepfathers is mentioned as having been incarcerated in Shawshank, a teenaged perpetrator of a hate crime is sentenced to serve a term in Shawshank, and another character is threatened with working in "the lime pit" at Shawshank.
1990	The Sun Dog	Novella published in Four Past Midnight.
1991	Needful Things	
1992	Dolores Claiborne	
1993	"The Fifth Quarter"	Originally published in the April 1972 issue of Cavalier, "The Fifth Quarter" was later revised and published in the 1993 short story collection Nightmares & Dreamscapes. It's in this latter publication in which the main character mentions that he served time at Shawshank.
1998	Bag of Bones	
2002	From a Buick 8	
2007	Blaze	
2009	Under the Dome	After Jim Rennie Junior kills Angie McCain and Dodee Sanders, he fears being sent to Shawshank.
2010	A Good Marriage	Novella published in Full Dark, No Stars.
2011	11/22/63	
2020	Mr. Harrigan's Phone	Novella published in If It Bleeds.
2021	Later	

== In other media ==
=== Television ===
In February 2017, Hulu announced they were partnering with J. J. Abrams and Stephen King to create a limited series entitled Castle Rock. Later that month, Hulu issued a ten-episode order for the series, with production set to begin at a later date. It was also revealed that the series would bring together characters and situations from throughout King's entire canon. Filming for the series began in August 2017. The small Western Massachusetts town of Orange served as a stand in for filming scenes set in Castle Rock. The series premiered on Hulu on July 25, 2018. In August 2018, Hulu announced that they have renewed the series for a second season, which premiered on October 23, 2019.

Apart from appearing in the Castle Rock TV series, Shawshank State Prison is also mentioned in two episodes of Haven and multiple episodes of It: Welcome to Derry. References to the prison can also be found in works of King's son Joe Hill, including the novel NOS4A2 and the 2019 comic Basket Full of Heads. Shawshank was also referenced in an episode of Murder, She Wrote ("Race to Death", season 12, episode 21), though unconnected to works from King and Hill.

=== Film ===
The town of Castle Rock made its first onscreen appearance in the 1983 film Cujo. In that film, Mendocino and Santa Rosa, California, stood in for Castle Rock. That same year, Castle Rock appeared onscreen again in The Dead Zone. This time, the Maine town was portrayed by locations in and around Niagara Falls, Ontario, including the Screaming Tunnel and Queen's Royal Park in neighboring Niagara-on-the-Lake.

Stand by Me (1986), a film adaptation of King's 1982 novella The Body, was the next film in which Castle Rock appeared. However, in this version of the story, Castle Rock is located in the state of Oregon. Filming took place in Oregon as well as California, with locations including Brownsville, Oregon, and Lake Britton in Shasta County, California. Director Rob Reiner later named his production company Castle Rock Entertainment, which subsequently produced several adaptations of King's works.

In addition to appearing onscreen, the town of Castle Rock is also referenced in several films. The first such reference came in the 1982 film Creepshow, which was Stephen King's first produced screenplay. At the end of the film's "The Lonesome Death of Jordy Verrill" segment, a directional sign shows Castle Rock located five miles away.

In the 1990 film adaptation of Graveyard Shift, the character Jane Wisconsky tells John Hall she is originally from Castle Rock.

The screenplay to the 1992 film Sleepwalkers was also written by King. In the film, the sheriff calls for backup from Castle Rock. However, this version of Castle Rock is located in Indiana.

The town of Gibsons, British Columbia, Canada, serves as the location of Castle Rock in the 1993 film Needful Things.

In the 2007 film adaptation of King's novella The Mist (1980), David Drayton reads a newspaper called The Castle Rock Times.

== In popular culture ==
The name "Shawshank" is often used in popular culture as a noun to reference a successful prison break. An example of this can be found in the twelfth episode of The Flash's first season. The series features cast members from The Shawshank Redemption, including Clancy Brown and William Sadler.

== See also ==
- Shawshank tree, a white oak tree featured in the 1994 film
