= Cujo =

Novel by Stephen King

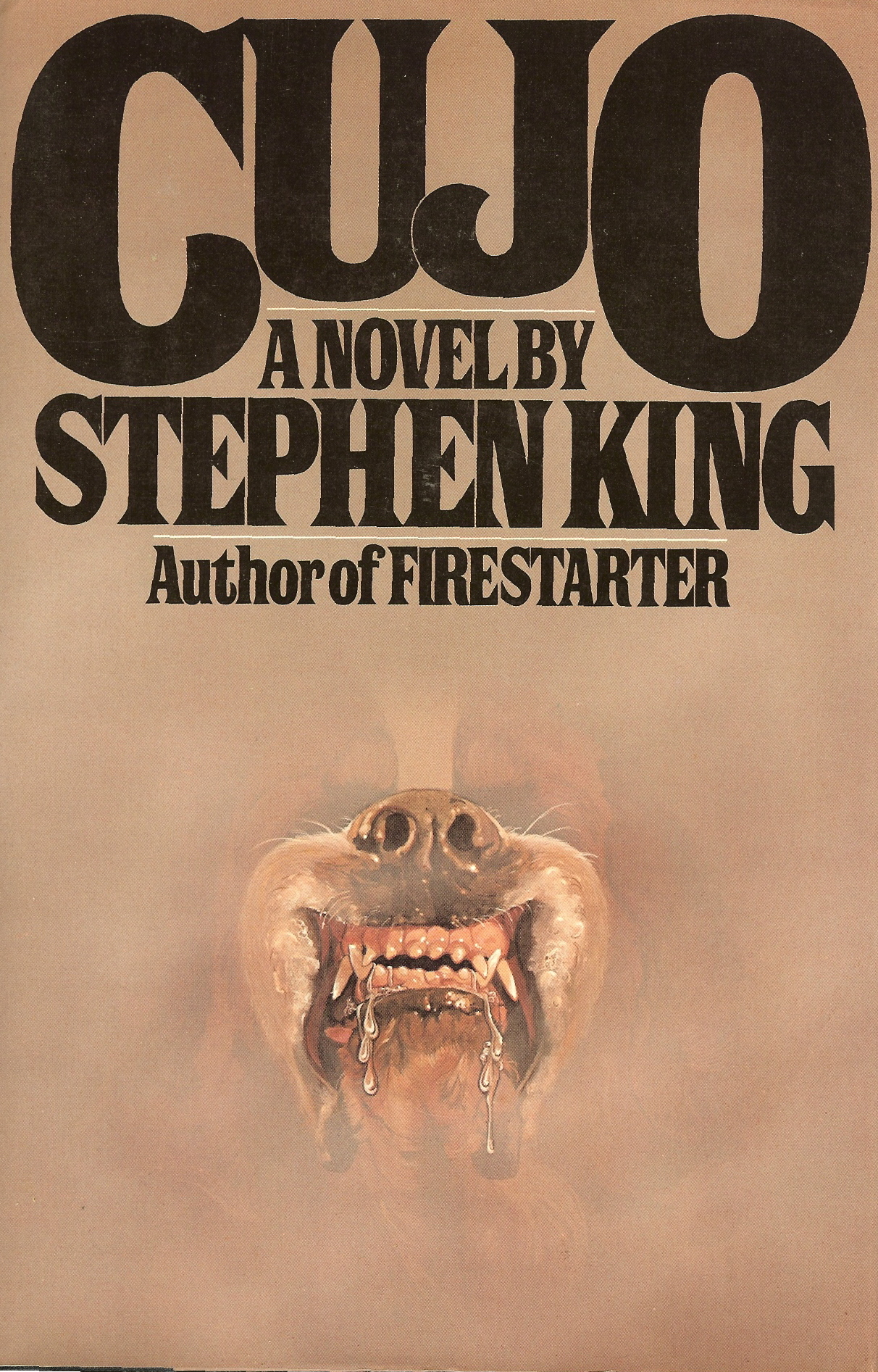
- First edition cover
- Author: Stephen King
- Language: English
- Genre: Horror
- Set in: Castle Rock, Maine
- Publisher: Viking Press
- Publication date: September 8, 1981
- Publication place: United States
- Media type: Print (hardcover)
- Pages: 319
- ISBN: 978-0-670-45193-7
- Followed by: Rattlesnakes

Cujo (/ˈkuːdʒoʊ/) is a 1981 horror novel by American writer Stephen King about a Saint Bernard who contracts rabies, then goes on a killing spree in his hometown. The novel won the British Fantasy Award in 1982 and was made into a film in 1983. Cujo's name was based on the alias of Willie Wolfe, one of the men responsible for orchestrating Patty Hearst's kidnapping and indoctrination into the Symbionese Liberation Army. King mentions Cujo in On Writing, referring to it as a novel he "barely remember[s] writing at all". King wrote the book during the height of his struggle with alcohol addiction. King goes on to say he likes the book and wishes he could remember enjoying the good parts as he put them on the page.

== Background ==
According to King, the novel was partly inspired by his trip to a mechanic during the spring of 1977. In a 2006 interview with The Paris Review, King describes how issues with his motorcycle led him to visit an auto shop on the northern outskirts of Bridgton, Maine. He claims his motorcycle died when he arrived at the shop, and moments after, a Saint Bernard emerged from the garage, growling at him and eventually lunging for his hand. Although the mechanic stopped the dog from harming King by hitting the dog's hindquarters with a wrench, King was still startled by the encounter. This incident, as well as a story published in a Portland, Maine, newspaper about a young child who was killed by a Saint Bernard, provided inspiration for the novel. King also owned a dysfunctional Ford Pinto at the time, which is the same car model the novel's protagonist, Donna Trenton, drives to the auto garage where she encounters the rabid Cujo.

== Plot ==
In 1977, the middle-class Trentons move from NYC to Castle Rock, Maine. In the summer of 1980, Vic learns that Donna has recently had an affair with local tennis player Steve Kemp. In the midst of this household tension, Vic's advertising agency is failing due to a cereal scandal. Vic is forced to go on a business trip, leaving Donna and their son, four-year-old Tad, at home alone.

Joe Camber is a blue-collar mechanic who abuses his wife, Charity, and their ten-year-old son, Brett. Charity wins a $5,000 (equivalent to $18,000 in 2025) lottery prize and uses the proceeds to bargain with Joe to allow her to take Brett on a trip to visit Charity's sister in Connecticut and show him the possibility of a better life. Joe agrees and secretly plans to take a pleasure trip to Boston with his friend Gary Pervier, an alcoholic war veteran.

The Cambers' dog Cujo, a large, good-natured St. Bernard, chases a rabbit in the nearby wilderness and inserts his head in a small cave. A bat bites him on the nose and infects him with rabies, against which Cujo has not been vaccinated. Cujo enters the prodromal phase, becoming lethargic and irritable. After Charity and Brett leave town, Cujo kills Joe and Gary.

Donna, with Tad, takes their failing Ford Pinto to Joe's house for repairs. The car breaks down in the Cambers' dooryard; as Donna attempts to find Joe, Cujo attacks her. She gets back into the car but is trapped when Cujo continues attacking them. The interior of the car becomes increasingly hot in the summer sun. During one escape attempt, Donna is bitten in the stomach and leg but manages to escape back into the car. Tad becomes catatonic with fear and begins to have seizures.

Steve goes to the Trenton home to attack Donna after she ends their affair and ransacks the empty house. Vic returns to Castle Rock after failed attempts to contact his wife. The police suspect Steve of kidnapping Donna and Tad. Sheriff George Bannerman is sent to the Cambers' house, but Cujo attacks and kills him. After witnessing the attack and realizing Tad is in danger of dying of dehydration, Donna battles the weakened Cujo, with the animal seemingly winning before she bludgeons and stabs him in the head with the remains of the baseball bat. Cujo slumps over, dead.

Vic arrives as the fight ends, but Tad has already died from dehydration and heat stroke. A veterinarian performs a necropsy on Cujo to check for rabies prior to the cremation of his remains. Charity receives a phone call speaking about the deaths of Tad and her husband due to Cujo's rampage.

Several months later, the Trenton and Camber families are trying to move on. Donna completed her treatment for rabies, and her injuries healed. The Trentons' marriage has survived, as well as Vic's business, and they mourn Tad together. Charity, now working in order to support herself and Brett, gives her son a new, vaccinated puppy. In postscript, it is said that the hole Cujo chased the rabbit into was never discovered, and the bats abandoned it. It also reiterates to the reader that Cujo was a good dog who always tried to keep his owners happy, but the ravage of rabies drove him to violence.

== Characters ==
- Cujo: a friendly Saint Bernard that becomes murderous after contracting rabies from a bat bite.
- Donna Trenton: wife of Vic Trenton. She becomes trapped in the car after arriving at the auto shop where Cujo lurks.
- Vic Trenton: Donna's husband. He is on a work-related trip when his wife and son encounter Cujo at the Camber auto shop.
- Tad Trenton: son of Donna and Vic. He becomes trapped in the car with Donna at the auto shop.
- Gary Pervier: the next-door neighbor and poker buddy of Joe Camber. A sixty-year-old WW2 army veteran and an alcoholic. He is the first victim of Cujo.
- Joe Camber: mechanic and owner of the auto shop where Donna and Tad encounter Cujo. Owner of Cujo and second victim.
- Charity Camber: wife of Joe Camber. She and her son leave Cujo behind while on a trip to visit Charity's sister.
- Brett Camber: son of Joe and Charity.
- Frank Dodd: a former Castle Rock police officer who was discovered to be the "Castle Rock Strangler", a serial killer traumatizing Castle Rock during the 1970s (see The Dead Zone). Cujo makes many references to Dodd throughout the story.
- George Bannerman: the current Castle Rock sheriff. He once worked with Dodd and discovered Dodd's guilt in the Castle Rock murders. He is killed by Cujo in his attempt to save Donna and Tad.
- Steve Kemp: The man with whom Donna has had an affair. He breaks into and vandalizes Donna's house after learning she wants to end the affair.
- Roger Breakstone: Vic's friend and business partner. He accompanies Vic on his work-related trip.

== Critical reception ==
Upon its initial release in 1981, the novel earned and maintained a high position on bestseller lists in the United States. Some critics have criticized the novel for its ending. The 1983 film adaptation of the novel featured a more optimistic conclusion. Cujo received the following accolades:

- Locus Award Nominee for Best Fantasy Novel (1982)
- Balrog Award Nominee for Best Novel (1982)
- British Fantasy Award for Best Novel (August Derleth Fantasy Award) (1982)

According to the American Library Association, Cujo was the 49th most banned and challenged book in the United States between 1990 and 1999.

== Adaptations ==
=== Cujo (1983) ===
In 1983, Lewis Teague directed a film adaptation. Its plot is similar to the novel; however, Tad survives in the film. It was written for the screen by Don Carlos Dunaway and Barbara Turner.

=== Cujo (TBA) ===
On March 11, 2025, Netflix announced they were developing a new adaptation/remake of the 1983 film with Roy Lee serving as producer. On March 18, 2025, Darren Aronofsky was revealed to be in talks to direct.

== Allusions and connections to other King novels ==
- There are allusions to Cujo in King's other works, which often reference the Saint Bernard and refer generally to the incident of the summer of 1980 when the rabid dog killed four people in Castle Rock, Maine.
- On the official Stephen King website, Cujo is listed as a character in numerous other novels, including Needful Things, The Body, The Dark Half and Pet Sematary.
- King's 2024 collection, You Like It Darker, contains the story Rattlesnakes, described by King as a sequel to Cujo. It is told in the first person with Vic Trenton as narrator.
