= Nona (short story) =

- Short story by Stephen King
- Country: United States
- Language: English
- Genres: Horror, short story

Publication
- Published in: Shadows (1st release), Skeleton Crew
- Publication type: Anthology
- Media type: Print (Paperback)
- Publication date: 1978

"Nona" is a short horror story by Stephen King, first published in the 1978 anthology Shadows and later collected in King's 1985 collection Skeleton Crew.

== Plot summary ==
The story is the account of an unnamed man being held in prison, recounting his life as a college dropout who met and fell in love with a beautiful girl named Nona, while aimlessly hitchhiking on a snowy winter's night in Maine. That night, the narrator is seduced by Nona into murdering several innocent bystanders. Somewhere near Castle Rock, Nona lures the narrator to a graveyard and morphs into a hideously large rat which laughs at him. It's not immediately clear whether the narrator has encountered a supernatural force or Nona is a figment of his insanity. Later, the narrator is found alone by the authorities, taken into custody, and sentenced to prison where he now writes his tale. Also, the narrator is preparing to commit suicide as he contemplates hearing strange sounds in the walls (not unlike H.P. Lovecraft's short story "The Rats in the Walls" (1924), King's own earlier short story, "Jerusalem's Lot" (1978), or King's later novella "1922" (2010)).

== Connection to King's other works ==
In Hearts in Atlantis (1999) there is a character called Ronnie Malenfant, who has the same surname as the character Betsy Malenfant which appears in "Nona". In Hearts In Atlantis, Ronnie refers to having a sister.

Ace Merrill and Vern Tessio, who first appeared in The Body (1982), were not in the original version of this story but were added in flashback by King before the publication of Skeleton Crew in 1985. Ace later played a major role in Needful Things (1991).

== See also ==
- Stephen King short fiction bibliography
