= Needful Things (film) =

1993 film by Fraser Clarke Heston

- Theatrical release poster
- Directed by: Fraser C. Heston
- Screenplay by: W. D. Richter
- Based on: Needful Things by Stephen King
- Produced by: Jack Cummins
- Starring: Ed Harris; Max von Sydow; Bonnie Bedelia; J. T. Walsh; Amanda Plummer
- Cinematography: Tony Westman
- Edited by: Rob Kobrin
- Music by: Patrick Doyle
- Production companies: Castle Rock Entertainment; New Line Cinema
- Distributed by: Columbia Pictures
- Release date: August 27, 1993
- Running time: 120 minutes
- Country: United States
- Language: English
- Box office: $15.2 million (US)

Needful Things is a 1993 American horror thriller film based on Stephen King's 1991 novel of the same name. The film was directed by Fraser C. Heston, and stars Ed Harris, Max von Sydow, Bonnie Bedelia, and J. T. Walsh. Needful Things was released by Columbia Pictures on August 27, 1993. The film received mixed reviews, critics praised the performances and ending, but criticized its portrayal of its story and felt it inferior to its source material, while grossing $15.2 million.

== Plot ==
Leland Gaunt arrives in Castle Rock, Maine, and opens a shop called Needful Things where he exchanges items of great personal worth for "pranks" the customers must play on their neighbors. The first customer, a boy named Brian Rusk, receives a rare baseball card in return for throwing turkey muck onto Wilma Jerzyck's sheets as they dry on clothes lines. Wilma assumes her enemy Nettie Cobb is responsible. She confronts Nettie at her workplace, the Castle Rock Diner, and threatens Nettie's dog. Gaunt then makes Brian return to Wilma's house and throw apples at it, breaking the windows. Wilma thinks Nettie did it because she is well known for the apple pies she makes daily at the diner.

Boat salesman Danforth Keeton has embezzled $20,000 of town tax money to pay gambling debts. After Sheriff Alan Pangborn tells Keeton that state auditors suspect him, Gaunt sells Keeton a clockwork game that predicts the outcome of any horse race, allowing him to recoup and replace the money before he can be charged. Keeton hates the townspeople who mockingly call him "Buster" Keeton, and has a long-running feud with Deputy Norris Ridgewick.

Meanwhile, Nettie Cobb obtains a figurine from Gaunt that is identical to one her violent ex-husband destroyed. To pay her debt she sneaks into Keeton's house and scatters citation notices, allegedly from Ridgewick, throughout. While she does this, Hugh Priest kills Nettie's dog in exchange for a 1950s college letter jacket. Nettie assumes Wilma killed the dog and confronts her. A violent fight erupts, killing both women. Brian tries to talk to Alan as he investigates the deaths, but loses courage and leaves. Alan later finds Brian and asks why he is scared. Brian says that Gaunt is a monster then holds a gun to his head and threatens suicide. The gun goes off but Alan manages to save Brian's life.

Gaunt gives Alan's fiancée Polly Chalmers a necklace that cures her crippling arthritis, telling her she must never remove it. After Alan's talk with Brian, he is very suspicious of Gaunt and begs Polly to remove the necklace, but she is unwilling. After Alan leaves she tries to pry the necklace open but an electric shock throws it across the room. Her hands immediately become twisted and she cannot pick it up. Gaunt appears and replaces it on her neck. Polly becomes mesmerized by Gaunt, who tells her that Alan has been embezzling money for years. He convinces her to go to Alan's boat to see the evidence. She finds a large amount of cash strewn over Alan's desk and phones him to break off their engagement.

Keeton attacks Ridgewick at the police station. Alan subdues Keeton, but after he leaves, Keeton overpowers Ridgewick and escapes. He drives home, accuses his wife of having an affair with Ridgewick, and kills her with a hammer. Gaunt then has Keeton place explosives in the Catholic church, where Alan is telling Father Meehan that he suspects Gaunt is the Devil incarnate. The church explodes, but Alan and Meehan escape. Father Meehan believes that the town's Baptist minister Reverend Rose is behind the attack and goes to find him.

Gaunt starts selling guns, encouraging people to kill whoever wronged them, and his pranks spread paranoia and anger throughout the town. A riot ensues with Gaunt watching from the sidelines and Alan trying to restore order. He pulls his gun on Father Meehan, who is trying to behead Reverend Rose, and Gaunt encourages him to shoot them. Instead, Alan fires into the air, getting everyone's attention. Alan brings the townsfolk to their senses by exposing Gaunt's web of lies and manipulation.

A despondent Keeton emerges from Needful Things, pointing a gun at Alan and Ridgewick and wearing a vest of explosives. Alan talks him down and helps him see Gaunt's true nature, but Gaunt taunts Keeton and repeatedly calls him "Buster". Infuriated, Keeton pushes Gaunt through the store window, setting off the bomb and destroying Needful Things.

Defeated but completely unharmed, Gaunt emerges from the burning wreckage saying that this was not his best work. He tells Alan and Polly that he looks forward to collaborating with their grandson in 2053, then departs.

== Cast ==
- Ed Harris as Sheriff Alan J. Pangborn
- Max von Sydow as Leland Gaunt
- Bonnie Bedelia as Polly Chalmers
- Amanda Plummer as Netitia "Nettie" Cobb
- J. T. Walsh as Danforth "Buster" Keeton III
- Ray McKinnon as Deputy Norris Ridgewick
- Valri Bromfield as Wilma Wadlowski Jerzyck
- Duncan Fraser as Hugh Priest
- Shane Meier as Brian Rusk
- W. Morgan Sheppard as Father Meehan
- Don S. Davis as Reverend Willie Rose
- Gillian Barber as Myrtle Keeton
- Lochlyn Munro as John LaPointe
- Campbell Lane as Frank Jewett
- Frank C. Turner as Pete Jerzyck
- Robert Easton as Lester Pratt.
- Lisa Blount as Cora Rusk (uncredited)

== Reception ==
Needful Things received mixed reviews from critics. The film holds a 32% rating on Rotten Tomatoes, based on 28 reviews, with an average rating of 4.8/10. Audiences polled by CinemaScore gave the film an average grade of "B−" on an A+ to F scale.

Roger Ebert gave it 1.5 out of 4 stars, saying the film "only has one note, which it plays over and over, sort of a Satanic water torture. It's not funny and it's not scary and it's all sort of depressing." Janet Maslin, film and literary critic for The New York Times, gave the film a resoundingly negative review, saying that "though this is by no means the grisliest or most witless film made from one of Mr. King's horrific fantasies, it can lay claim to being the most unpleasant."

== Awards ==
At the 1993 Academy of Science Fiction, Fantasy & Horror Films Awards, Needful Things was nominated for three Saturn Awards and won one: Amanda Plummer for best supporting actress.

== Release ==
On May 22, 1996, Needful Things was aired in a four-hour timeslot on TBS. This airing included more than an hour of excised footage not included in the theatrical release, including scene extensions, abridgements, reordering, and additional scenes of character & world development, in addition to edits for language & violence.

=== Home media ===
Needful Things was originally released on VHS in February 1994, by New Line Home Video. Afterwards, the rights to the title reverted to MGM Home Entertainment, who released it on DVD in August 2002.

In July 2023, Kino Lorber released an Ultra HD Blu-ray edition, containing both the theatrical cut, presented in a new 4K remaster, and the full-length TV version, presented in upscaled HD from an SD master.

== Related film ==
The character of Alan Pangborn (Ed Harris) also appeared in The Dark Half, based on the 1989 novel of the same name, where he is portrayed by Michael Rooker. The film makes no reference to Needful Things, as it is set prior to the events of Needful Things.
