= The Dark Half (film) =

1993 American horror film by George A. Romero

- Original 1993 theatrical poster
- Directed by: George A. Romero
- Screenplay by: George A. Romero
- Based on: The Dark Half by Stephen King
- Produced by: Declan Baldwin
- Starring: Timothy Hutton; Amy Madigan; Julie Harris; Michael Rooker
- Cinematography: Tony Pierce-Roberts
- Edited by: Pasquale Buba
- Music by: Christopher Young
- Production company: Dark Half Productions
- Distributed by: Orion Pictures
- Release date: April 23, 1993
- Running time: 121 minutes
- Country: United States
- Language: English
- Budget: $15 million
- Box office: $10.6 million

The Dark Half is a 1993 American supernatural horror film written and directed by George A. Romero, and starring Timothy Hutton, Amy Madigan, Michael Rooker, Julie Harris, and Royal Dano in his final film role. An adaptation of the 1989 novel of the same name by Stephen King, the film follows a writer whose personal and writerly alter ego begins to commit a series of murders. Hutton's performance was commended but overall reviews were mixed, and The Dark Half was a box office disappointment.

== Plot ==
An author of highbrow literary novels, Thad Beaumont is better known for the bestselling murder mystery suspense-thrillers he writes under the pen name "George Stark". Beaumont wishes to retire the Stark name and symbolically buries Stark in a mock grave.

Stark has mysteriously become a physical entity and begins terrorizing Beaumont's family and friends after he emerges from the grave. Stark then kills local photographer Homer Gamache and steals his truck. He then murders Thad's editor, agent, and his agent's ex-wife, and kills a man named Fred Clawson, who was trying to blackmail Thad. Stark also kills at least one hotel desk clerk and several cops, and his off-story murder of a cocaine-using young woman who provided information on the Beaumont/Stark link is so brutal that the characters don't state how she died.

When the police suspect Thad of murdering Gamache, he tries to convince Sheriff Alan Pangborn of Castle Rock, Maine that he had nothing to do with it. After putting an all-points bulletin on Clawson, who was accused of the death of Gamache, the New York police find him castrated and his throat slit. They find a message on the wall, written in Clawson's blood: "The sparrows are flying again." Thad starts to think that he may have a psychic connection to the killer.

While in his office, Thad begins to receive messages from Stark, and begins to worry about the next victim. He and his family start to receive threatening phone calls from Stark. Pangborn initially suspects the phone calls are a prank by Thad himself until Stark begins to describe how he is going to kill Thad's family, disturbing Pangborn.

State Police find Gamache's truck with Thad's fingerprints all over it. For some reason, Stark wants to live in the material world, after only appearing in a set of Thad's best selling books. Thad writes, but he is not alone in suspecting something strange: Sheriff Pangborn is equally suspicious and continues investigating. Thad begins to realize that Stark is his parasitic twin brother who died at "childbirth".

Thad's mother never told him about the twin, and he was completely unaware until a local doctor tells him that Stark was a fraternal twin that was living inside Thad's brain. (A scene in the film's start shows a developing fetus inside Beaumont's brain.) Stark arrives, kills the doctor, and blames Thad for the crime. Thad's colleague Reggie realizes that Stark is an entity controlled by the books that Thad wrote and that Stark will do anything he can to stop Thad. Stark kidnaps Thad's wife Liz and his children, and makes a deal with Thad: finish a book that depicts Stark living in the real world, or he will kill his family.

While writing the book, Thad notices Stark is healing himself with his writings, as Stark started to deteriorate due to Thad not writing anymore books, causing Thad to absorb his sickness. Thad and Stark get into a fight, which ends with Thad stabbing Stark in the neck with a pencil. Sheriff Pangborn arrives and unties Liz, who says that Thad and Stark are upstairs. A huge flock of sparrows arrive via a bird call Thad's friend and colleague Rawlie gave to him and tears Stark apart, taking him to the land of the dead. The sparrows are agents of Death that come to collect souls and carry them to their final destination. Thad and Liz are spared, and they, along with Pangborn, watch as the sparrows disappear into the night.

== Cast ==
- Timothy Hutton as Thad Beaumont and George Stark
- Amy Madigan as Liz Beaumont
- Michael Rooker as Sheriff Alan Pangborn
- Julie Harris as Reggie Delesseps
- Robert Joy as Fred Clawson
- Chelsea Field as Annie Pangborn
- Royal Dano as Digger Holt
- Rutanya Alda as Miriam Cowley
- Beth Grant as Shayla Beaumont
- Kent Broadhurst as Mike Donaldson
- Tom Mardirosian as Rick Cowley
- Glenn Colerider as Homer Gamache

== Production ==
The film was shot from October 1990 until March 1991, partly at Washington & Jefferson College, in Washington, near Pittsburgh, Pennsylvania. Notable in the film are the chapel in the Old Main, seen at the beginning of the film as Beaumont's classroom, and the office of the college chaplain, used as Beaumont's office. Members of the faculty and student body served as extras in the film.

The residence featured in the film is a home located on Maple Avenue in the Edgewood neighborhood of Pittsburgh.

The film was Romero's third foray into filming with the support of a major film production company (after Creepshow and Monkey Shines), causing some problems for the notoriously low-budget director.

== Release ==
The Dark Half was not released for two years after its completion because of Orion Pictures' bleak financial situation at the time. The film eventually saw release in the United States on April 23, 1993.

=== Home media ===
Scream Factory released The Dark Half on Blu-ray on November 18, 2014. Eureka! Entertainment released a dual-format DVD and Blu-ray set in the United Kingdom on October 14, 2019.

On June 5, 2025, Vinegar Syndrome released a 4K UHD Blu-ray edition.

== Reception ==
=== Box office ===
In its opening week The Dark Half ranked in the box office charts at number 6, gathering a total of $3,250,883 from 1,563 theatres.

=== Critical response ===
Critics gave the film mixed reviews, though they praised Timothy Hutton's performance in the film as well as the screenplay. On Rotten Tomatoes, it currently holds a 55% from 40 reviews. The critics consensus reads: ”The Dark Half is a highly serious psychological study that can be faulted for being more curious than actually scary.” Metacritic, which uses a weighted average, assigned the film a score of 53 out of 100, based on 17 critics, indicating "mixed or average" reviews.

Roger Ebert gave the film two out of four stars, praising Hutton's against type performance as Stark that "definitively shed his nice-guy image". He faulted it for failing to "develop its preternatural opening theme" and not offering a satisfactory explanation for Stark's existence. The Chicago Tribune praised the film's special effects and described the film as entertaining, but was critical of Madigan's performance.

Michael Wilmington of the Los Angeles Times alternately praised the acting ensemble and summarized: "Violent and credibility-straining it may be, but it's not cheap or thoughtless. The film captures the best part[s] of the book." Vincent Canby of The New York Times praised the film's screenplay as intelligent, adding that it is "an exceptionally entertaining film of its kind. Only Stanley Kubrick has ever adapted a King novel (The Shining) in such a way that the ending remains as satisfyingly spooky as the beginning."

Kristi Turnquist of The Oregonian awarded the film a two and a half out of four-star rating, praising its nightmarish tone and writing, "Though The Dark Half loses its punch in the second half, Romero and Hutton make it frightening and funny enough to qualify as—drum roll, please—the best evil-twin horror movie this year."

=== Accolades ===
Institution	Year	Category	Recipient(s)	Result	Ref.
Fangoria Chainsaw Awards	1993	Best Actor	Timothy Hutton	Nominated	
Fangoria Chainsaw Awards	1993	Best Actress	Amy Madigan	Nominated	
Fangoria Chainsaw Awards	1993	Best Supporting Actor	Michael Rooker	Nominated	
Fangoria Chainsaw Awards	1993	Best Supporting Actress	Julie Harris	Nominated	
Fangoria Chainsaw Awards	1993	Best Wide-Release Film	The Dark Half	Nominated	
Fangoria Chainsaw Awards	1993	Best Screenplay	George A. Romero	Won	
Fangoria Chainsaw Awards	1993	Best Soundtrack	Christopher Young	Nominated	
Fangoria Chainsaw Awards	1993	Best Makeup FX	John Vulich; Everett Burrell	Nominated	
Fantafestival	1993	Best Actor	Timothy Hutton	Won	
Fantafestival	1993	Best Film	George A. Romero	Won	
Fantafestival	1993	Best Screenplay	Paul Hunt; Nick MCCarthy	Won	
Saturn Awards	1993	Best Director	George A. Romero	Nominated	
Saturn Awards	1993	Best Horror Film	The Dark Half	Nominated	
Saturn Awards	1993	Best Make-Up	John Vulich; Everett Burrell	Nominated	
Saturn Awards	1993	Best Supporting Actress	Julie Harris	Nominated	

== Related film ==
The character of Alan Pangborn (Michael Rooker) also appears in Needful Things, based on the 1991 novel of the same name, portrayed by Ed Harris.
