= Four Past Midnight =

1990 novella collection by Stephen King

- First edition cover
- Author: Stephen King
- Cover artist: Rob Wood-Stansbury
- Language: English
- Genre: Supernatural fiction
- Publisher: Viking
- Publication date: September 24, 1990
- Publication place: United States
- Media type: Print (hardcover)
- Pages: 763
- ISBN: 978-0-670-83538-6
- Preceded by: Skeleton Crew
- Followed by: Nightmares & Dreamscapes

Four Past Midnight is a collection of novellas written by Stephen King in 1988 and 1989 and published in August 1990. It is his second book of this type, the first one being Different Seasons. The collection won the Bram Stoker Award in 1990 for Best Collection and was nominated for a Locus Award in 1991. In the introduction, King says that, while a collection of four novellas like Different Seasons, this book is more strictly horror with elements of the supernatural.

== Novellas ==
=== The Langoliers ===
The Langoliers
- Author: Stephen King
- Language: English
- Genre: Dark fantasy
- Publication place: United States

==== Plot ====
Pilot Brian Engle, immediately after a difficult flight from Tokyo to Los Angeles, learns that his ex-wife Anne has died in an accident and boards a red-eye flight to Boston as a passenger. A flight attendant speaks of an unusual phenomenon over the Mojave Desert that resembles an aurora. Brian falls asleep during takeoff, having been awake throughout his previous flight. Dinah Bellman, a young blind girl with psychic abilities, also falls asleep, and awakes to find that her aunt and several other passengers have disappeared.

Dinah, mistaking a wig for a scalp, screams and awakes Brian and nine other passengers: teacher Laurel Stevenson, English diplomat Nick Hopewell, writer Bob Jenkins, violinist Albert Kaussner, recovering addict Bethany Simms, businessman Rudy Warwick, mechanic Don Gaffney, mentally ill bank manager Craig Toomy and an unknown heavily intoxicated passenger. The passengers find that the crew and the passengers who were awake have disappeared, leaving the airliner under the control of the autopilot. Brian takes control of the plane but is unable to make any outside contact, and the passengers can only see a dark void below. Brian manages to land in Bangor, Maine, despite furious protests from Toomy, who insists on reaching Boston for an important board meeting.

Upon arrival, the group finds the airport deserted. The clocks have stopped, there is no electricity and the environment seems generally lifeless. As all products and substances have lost their quality, fuel does not burn, thus preventing further flight. Dinah hears an approaching and threatening sound, and the group agrees to leave before it arrives. The unhinged Toomy considers the situation to be a conspiracy against him and takes Bethany hostage at gunpoint, but the environment has robbed the gun of its potency, and the passengers subdue Toomy.

Bob concludes that the aforementioned phenomenon was a "time rip" that has sent their plane into the past. As Dinah reports that the sound is growing closer, Toomy relates to Dinah and Laurel that the sound is emitted by the "Langoliers", which were said by his abusive father to hunt and devour negligent and unmotivated boys. Albert theorizes that time is still flowing inside the plane, which is proven when food brought on board is restored to its normal properties. With the realization that fuel pumped into the airliner will also return to normal, Brian has the plane refueled and manages to start the engines. Meanwhile, Toomy frees himself from his bonds and stabs Dinah, perceiving her to be a Langolier. Despite this, Dinah insists that Toomy must not be killed because the group needs him alive. As Albert and Don search for a stretcher for Dinah, Toomy kills Don before Albert subdues him. Dinah, while being transported onto the plane, telepathically leads Toomy to the runway, where he hallucinates his board meeting. The Langoliers appear in the form of toothed spherical creatures, and they are distracted from the departing plane as they devour Toomy and the surrounding reality.

Bob proposes that the Langoliers' purpose is to clean up what is left of the past by devouring it. Dinah succumbs to her injuries, and the plane approaches the time rip. Bob realizes that the passengers must be asleep when passing through the rip, otherwise they will disappear. Albert suggests lowering the cabin pressure to induce unconsciousness, which would require one passenger to sacrifice himself by remaining conscious to restore the pressure just before the plane passes through the rip. Nick volunteers, wishing to atone for mistakenly shooting and killing three Irish children, and asks Laurel to go to his father to ask forgiveness. Nick, wearing an emergency oxygen mask, flies the plane through the rip and disappears. Brian awakes and lands the plane at Los Angeles, but the passengers are again met with a deserted airport. Realizing that they are in the near future, the passengers take shelter against a wall to avoid the airport's human traffic and wait for the present to catch up to them. A wave of rising noise and motion hits them and they find themselves in the present again.

==== Adaptations ====
The Langoliers was adapted for a two-part TV movie in 1995. The TV movie stars Kate Maberly, Kimber Riddle, Patricia Wettig, Mark Lindsay Chapman, Frankie Faison, Baxter Harris, Dean Stockwell, David Morse, Christopher Collet, and Bronson Pinchot.

The movie version of The Langoliers, produced for broadcast on ABC-TV, was filmed almost exclusively in and around the Bangor International Airport in Bangor, Maine (where author Stephen King attended college) during the summer of 1994. King himself, echoing Alfred Hitchcock's famous numerous cameos, made a cameo appearance in the film as Craig Toomy's boss during Toomy's hallucination.

In 2021, Greek filmmaker Aristotelis Maragkos created an experimental film using footage from the miniseries of The Langoliers, titled The Timekeepers of Eternity. Maragkos re-edited the series to a single hour to focus more closely on Toomy’s deterioration, and printed each individual frame onto black and white copy paper in order to hand-animate each scene with stop-motion.

The audiobook of this story is read by actor Willem Dafoe.

=== Secret Window, Secret Garden ===
Secret Window, Secret Garden
- Author: Stephen King
- Genre: Horror, Thriller

Secret Window, Secret Garden is similar to King's earlier novel The Dark Half. Both are about authors who are thinly veiled analogues of King himself—Thad Beaumont in The Dark Half and Mort Rainey in Secret Window, Secret Garden.

==== Plot ====
Morton Rainey, a successful novelist in Maine, is confronted by a man from Mississippi named John Shooter, who claims Mort plagiarized a story he wrote. Mort vehemently denies ever plagiarizing anything. Shooter leaves, but not before leaving his manuscript, "Secret Window, Secret Garden". Mort throws the manuscript into the trash can. When his housemaid recovers the manuscript—thinking it belongs to Mort—he finally reads Shooter's story, discovering that it is almost identical to his short story "Sowing Season". The only differences are the title, the character's name, the diction, and the ending. Mort is disturbed by these findings.

Shooter returns a few days later. Having learned that "Sowing Season" was published two years before Shooter claimed to have written "Secret Window, Secret Garden", Mort confronts him with this information. An enraged Shooter accuses Mort of lying and demands proof, giving Mort three days to show him his published story. Overnight, he kills Mort's cat and burns down the house of his ex-wife, which contained the magazine issue in which "Sowing Season" was published. Mort orders a new copy of the magazine. He also asks his caretaker, Greg Carstairs, to tail Shooter and to talk to a man named Tom Greenleaf, who drove past Mort and Shooter. Shooter, angry that Mort has involved other people in their business, kills both men and plants evidence framing Mort for the murders. Upon receiving the magazine and returning home, Mort finds that "Sowing Season" has been removed.

Mort realizes that Shooter is really his own split personality. He had created "Shooter" out of guilt for stealing the story "Crowfoot Mile" early in his career and had recently been suspected of another act of plagiarism, although he was innocent the second time. Tom had not seen Shooter while driving by—he saw Mort, by himself. Mort realizes he burned down his own home, killed his own cat, and murdered two people. Mort hears who he believes to be Shooter pulling into his driveway. Desperate for any sign of his own sanity, he looks outside only to see his ex-wife, Amy. Devastated, he loses control of his body and mind to Shooter. He blacks out. Amy discovers that Mort has gone insane, having written the word "Shooter" all over his house. She goes to Mort's study, where "Shooter" attempts to kill her in an ambush. She manages to escape. "Shooter", chasing Amy outside, is shot by her insurance investigator. Mort becomes himself again, addresses Amy, and dies.

Later, Amy and Ted Milner—a man she had an affair with before divorcing Mort—discuss her ex-husband's motives. She insists that Mort had become two people, one of them a character so vivid it became real. She then recalls something Tom witnessed—when he drove past Mort alone, he saw Shooter and Mort in his rearview mirror, but Shooter was transparent. Amy then reveals that while digging through Mort's house, she found Shooter's trademark hat. She left it right-side up on a trash bag. When she returned, she found a note from Shooter inside the overturned hat, revealing that he has traveled back to Mississippi with the story he came for, "Crowfoot Mile". Amy remarks that Mort had created a character so vivid, he actually came to life.

==== Adaptations ====
A 2004 film adaptation called Secret Window was made, starring Johnny Depp, John Turturro, Maria Bello and Timothy Hutton. The storyline of the movie differs from that of the novel, most notably in their respective endings. In the movie, Mort kills his wife and her lover, while in the novel he is killed before he has a chance to do so. In the movie, after months it is shown that Mort grew corn in his wife's garden, where it is implied that he buried her and her lover, thus removing any proof that he murdered them. Another difference is the titles of the short stories: in the movie, Mort Rainey wrote a story called "Secret Window" and John Shooter wrote "Sowing Season". The story in the movie version is set in upstate New York instead of Maine.

A three-episode radio adaptation was first broadcast in 1999 on BBC Radio 4 starring Henry Goodman, William Roberts, Barbara Barnes, Lee Montague and Kerry Shale.

The audiobook of this story is read by actor James Woods.

==== Inspiration ====
King has been the subject of unfounded accusations of plagiarism. A woman claimed that King stole several of her story ideas and based characters from his books on her. All of her cases have been dismissed. In another incident, a deranged man broke into King's home, and when discovered by King's wife, claimed that King stole the plot of Misery from the intruder's aunt and that he had a bomb in the shoebox he was holding and was going to blow up the house. The fake bomb was made of pencils with paperclips wrapped around the erasers.

=== The Library Policeman ===
The Library Policeman
- Author: Stephen King
- Genre: Horror

The Library Policeman tells of Sam Peebles and his battle against an age-old fear.

Peebles is asked to give a speech to his local Rotary Club. An office assistant named Naomi Higgins directs him to the public library to check out books that might help with his speechwriting. At the library, he receives a library card and assistance in finding books from an elderly librarian, Ardelia Lortz. Having noticed a series of disturbing posters in the children's section, including one featuring a frightening "Library Policeman" character, he discusses their appropriateness with Ardelia. After being rebuffed by her, Sam checks out the books with the warning that they must be returned on time or else "I'll have to send the Library Policeman after you."

The speech is a success, but the books are accidentally destroyed and a menacing Library Policeman terrorizes Sam at his house. Naomi informs Sam that Ardelia Lortz has been dead for many years. Ardelia, as a young woman, died by suicide in 1960 after murdering two children and a local deputy sheriff. Through Naomi, Sam meets Dave "Dirty Dave" Duncan, an alcoholic former sign painter and a former lover of Ardelia's. From Dave's recollections, Sam discovers that Ardelia is not a person but a being which feeds on fear and that Duncan was a sometimes unwilling companion/conspirator in helping her feed from the fear of children. Dave believes Ardelia is seeking revenge and a new host. While the trio attempt to stop Ardelia's return, Sam recalls a repressed memory: a man claiming to be a "Library Policeman" raped and threatened Sam when he was a young child in St. Louis. However, the new Library Policeman is not just a recreation of the man from Sam's past, but also an embodiment of Ardelia, who wants Sam as her new host.

Dave dies defending Sam and Naomi from Ardelia. Sam and Naomi defeat the Library Policeman/Ardelia, only to discover that Ardelia has already attached to Naomi in the form of a blistery growth. Sam removes the creature from Naomi's neck and destroys it under the wheels of a passing train.

==== Adaptations ====
The audiobook of this story is read by actor Ken Howard.

=== The Sun Dog ===
The Sun Dog
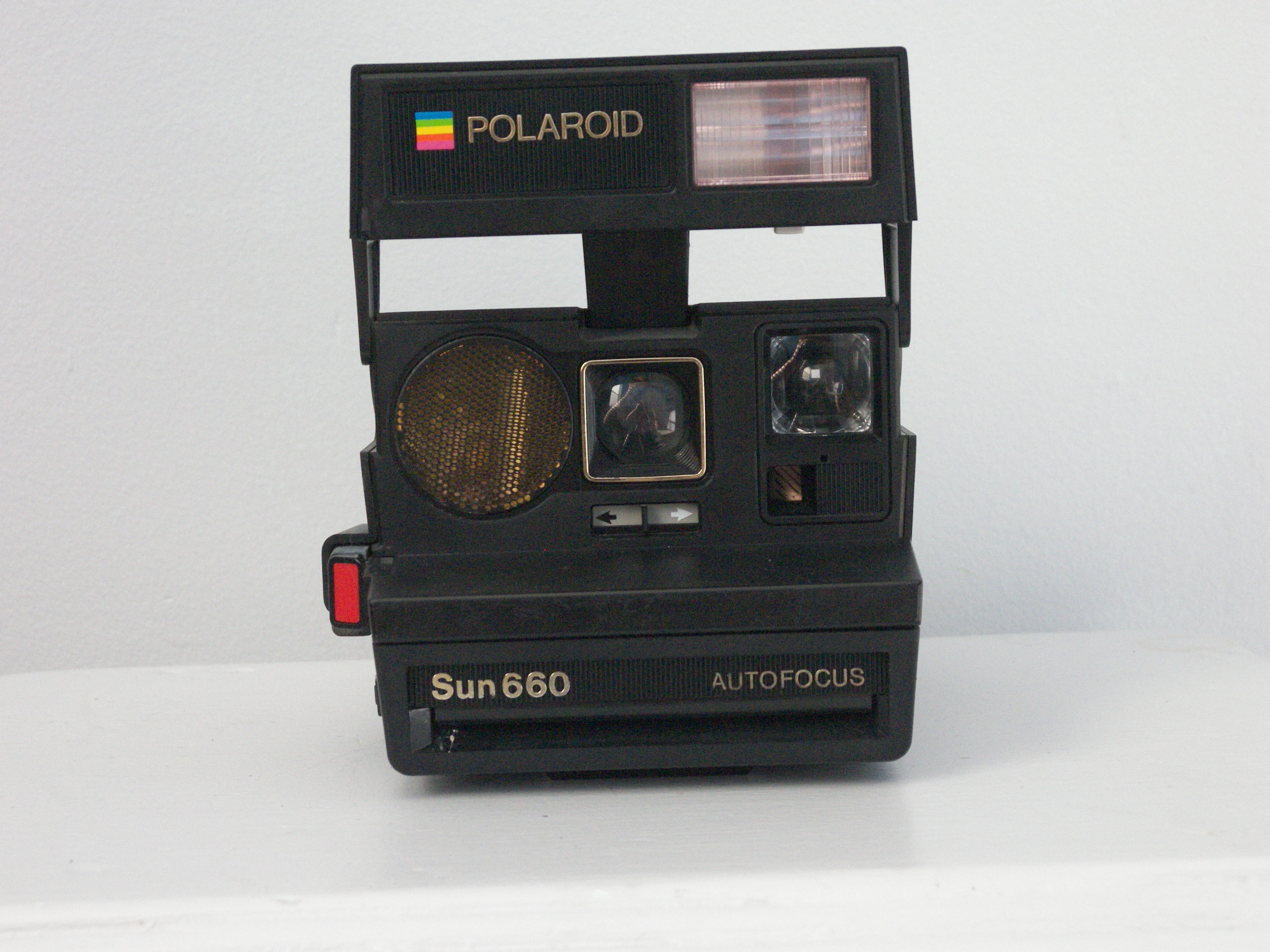
- A Polaroid Sun 660
- Author: Stephen King
- Genre: Supernatural horror

When Kevin Delevan receives a Sun 660 Polaroid camera for his fifteenth birthday, he discovers a strange defect: the only photos it produces are of a malicious black dog which seems to move closer with each shot as though to attack the photographer. On a recommendation, Kevin seeks help from Reginald "Pop" Merrill, the wealthy and unscrupulous owner of a junk shop in the town of Castle Rock, Maine. While just as unsettled by the phenomenon as Kevin, Merrill sees an opportunity to further his own interests; namely, selling the camera to a paranormal enthusiast for a great deal of money. He manages to switch out the camera for another of the same model, which Kevin destroys. Much to his dismay, however, Merrill cannot rid himself of the Sun as his customers either dismiss it as a hoax or decline to purchase it due to the discomfort and unease they feel upon viewing the photos. Furthermore, he finds himself increasingly compelled to use the Sun–the dog slowly advancing and transforming into something more savage and monstrous with every picture he takes.

In the meantime, Kevin is plagued by recurring nightmares about the dog. Realizing that Merrill tricked him and the Sun was never destroyed, he sets out to prevent Merrill from taking any more photos for fear that the dog will "break through" into the real world. By this point, the camera's influence over Merrill has caused him to lose his grip on sanity. After waking up one night to find himself holding the Sun and repeatedly pressing its trigger, he resolves to smash it in the morning. However, he hallucinates that one of the cuckoo clocks hanging on the wall of his store is really the camera and smashes that instead. Under the illusion that he is repairing a clock at his workbench, Merrill starts taking pictures again. At this moment, Kevin and his father arrive to confront Merrill, but are too late to stop him. The dog tears its way out of the final photograph, killing Merrill in the process. Inspired by his nightmares, Kevin has brought another Sun with him, and just as the dog is about to release itself, he takes its picture, trapping it once more in the "Polaroid world".

In the epilogue, Kevin gets a computer for his following birthday. In order to test its word processor function, he types "The quick brown fox jumps over the lazy dog." Rather than a printout of this text, the page reads, "The dog is loose again. It is not sleeping. It is not lazy. It's coming for you, Kevin. It's very hungry. And it's VERY angry."

==== Adaptations ====
In April 1999, White Cap Productions and IMAX Corporation announced a film adaptation of The Sun Dog. The proposed film, helmed by Lawrence D. Cohen (who had previously adapted King's Carrie and It), was to be filmed in IMAX's giant-screen 3D format, and distributed exclusively to IMAX theaters. Production was expected to begin in 2000, however by May of that year the project had been placed on hold. It was ultimately dropped from IMAX's production slate in October 2001.

The 2016 Audible audiobook of this story is read by Maine humorist Tim Sample.

== Reception ==
Upon its release, Michael A. Morrison in Washington Post called the collection "exceptionally well crafted" with the exception of Sun Dog, praising King's "unexpected similes" and his use of "dreams to reveal character". Robert Chatain called it possibly King's best book and "a serious, heavyweight effort", characterising the tales as "rich" as well as "fast, tricky, even perverse, like carnival rides that look easy from the ground but turn unexpectedly nasty and vertiginous when we're up in the air".

However, Josh Rubins in Entertainment Weekly graded the anthology a "C+" and considered it formulaic with "enthusiasm" and contemporary setting. Rubins compared "The Langoliers" to—quoting characters of the novella—a "stupid disaster [movie]" and a "bad [television] movie." He found "Secret Window, Secret Garden" bearably suspenseful with a "gimmicky, least convincing [finale]." He called "The Sun Dog" the "simplest, most distinctive story" and praised it as mostly "a delicious black comedy." Andy Solomon in The New York Times commented that King's mass appeal comes "ironically from his cliched diction," referring to the anthology's reliance on popular culture for descriptions.

== See also ==
- Stephen King short fiction bibliography
