= Mrs. Todd's Shortcut =

- Short story by Stephen King
- Country: United States
- Language: English
- Genre: Fantasy short story

Publication
- Published in: Redbook (1st release), Skeleton Crew
- Publication type: Magazine (1st release)
- Media type: Print (Paperback)
- Publication date: 1984

"Mrs. Todd's Shortcut" is a short story by Stephen King, first published in the May 1984 issue of Redbook magazine, and collected in King's 1985 collection Skeleton Crew.

== Plot summary ==
David, friend of a caretaker named Homer Buckland, is an elderly man who is spending his later years hanging out at the local gas station in a small town. He listens to Homer narrate a tale about a woman he knew named Ophelia Todd, who was obsessed with finding shortcuts before disappearing sometime ago. Homer admired her persistence but began to have doubts regarding her infatuation of the subject. Mrs. Todd's habit of resetting her odometer shows remarkable evidence that something strange is going on. He also discovered evidence that her shortcuts are taking fewer miles than are in a straight line between the trip origin and its destination, something that would be impossible in reality. Mrs. Todd compared the shortcuts to folding a map to bring two points closer together, suggesting she had discovered a warped version of reality, akin to a wormhole.

Mrs. Todd finally convinces Homer to take one of the special 'shortcuts'. On his first trip, Homer loses his hat to the grasping arms of a living tree. Soon he encounters road signs and bizarre animals which he cannot explain. Frightened, Homer does not wish to take any more rides. He also begins to notice how Mrs. Todd is changing and growing younger with each trip she takes. The appeal of this overwhelms Homer, despite his discovery of a horrifying rodent-like creature on the grille of her car which she brushes off as if it were a normal animal. She disappeared shortly after this with her husband officially declaring her dead after several years pass. After Homer returns from a trip to Vermont, David notices that he is looking younger. He watches as Homer gets into Mrs. Todd's car, noting that she appears to now resemble a teenager. As the two drive off into the night, David thinks about the prospect of getting younger himself.

== References to other works ==
A reference to Cujo is made when the story mentions Joe Camber getting killed by his own dog.

A indirect reference to The Dark Tower is made when the description of the creature clinging to the grille of Mrs. Todd’s Mercedes matches that of a billy-bumbler, a creature from Mid-World. King's 1991 novel The Waste Lands contains the first appearance of a billy-bumbler within the Dark Tower series. Given that the publication of "Mrs. Todd’s Shortcut" precedes that of The Waste Lands, it is possible that the first appearance inspired the latter.

== Reception and significance ==
The story has been cited as an example of the use of hyperspace space folding travel outside classic stories of interstellar space travel.

== See also ==
- Stephen King short fiction bibliography
