= It Grows on You =

- Short story by Stephen King
- Country: United States
- Language: English
- Genres: Horror, fantasy

Publication
- Published in: Marshroots
- Publication type: Periodical
- Publisher: University of Maine
- Media type: Print (magazine and paperback)
- Publication date: Autumn 1973

"It Grows on You" is a short story by American writer Stephen King, originally published in Marshroots in 1973. It was nominated for the 1983 Locus Award for "Best Short Story".

== Plot summary ==
The story recounts bizarre and inexplicable events that have taken place in a notorious house in the town of Castle Rock, Maine. The house seems to take on a life of its own as new wings are added, growing in a way that seems proportionate to the awful events that occurred there.

== Publication ==
King wrote "It Grows on You" in 1973. It was influenced by Sherwood Anderson's Winesburg, Ohio, Thornton Wilder's Our Town, and the works of Davis Grubb such as "Where the Woodbine Twineth". King sought to "capture that world of dirt roads, abandoned houses, and general stores full of old men, old baked bean supper posters, and old flypaper" and to depict "...a house that would grow every time some old campaigner in the town kicked the bucket [...] a kind of rambling New England memorial that was half-crypt, half living organism."

"It Grows on You" was originally published in volume three, number one of the University of Maine publication Marshroots in autumn 1973. In August 1982, a revised version was published in Whispers; this version was nominated for the Locus Award for "Best Short Story" in 1983 . In 1992, it was included in the anthology Death edited by Stuart Schiff. In October 1993, a further revised version was collected in King's book Nightmares & Dreamscapes. In the notes to Nightmares & Dreamscapes, King suggested that "It Grows on You" could serve as a sequel to his 1991 work Needful Things, which is also set in Castle Rock.

== See also ==
- Castle Rock (Stephen King)
- Needful Things
- Stephen King short fiction bibliography
