= Needful Things =

1991 novel by Stephen King

- Author: Stephen King
- Illustrator: Bill Russell
- Cover artist: Rob Wood
- Language: English
- Genre: Horror
- Publisher: Viking
- Publication date: October 1991
- Media type: Print (Hardcover and Paperback)
- Pages: 690
- ISBN: 978-0-670-83953-7

Needful Things is a 1991 horror novel by American author Stephen King. The story focuses on a shop that sells collectibles and antiques, managed by Leland Gaunt, a new arrival to the town of Castle Rock, Maine, the setting of many King stories. Gaunt often asks customers to perform a prank or mysterious deed in exchange for the item they are drawn to. As time goes by, the many deeds and pranks lead to increasing aggression among the townspeople, as well as chaos and death. A protagonist of the book is Alan Pangborn, previously seen in Stephen King's novel The Dark Half.

It was made into a 1993 film of the same name. According to the cover, this novel is "The Last Castle Rock Story". However, the town later serves as the setting for the short story "It Grows on You" (published in King's 1993 collection Nightmares & Dreamscapes, which King said serves as an epilogue to Needful Things) as well as King's 2017 novella Gwendy's Button Box and 2018 novella Elevation.

== Plot summary ==
A new shop named "Needful Things" opens in the small town of Castle Rock, Maine, sparking the curiosity of its citizens. The proprietor, Leland Gaunt, is a charming elderly gentleman purportedly from Akron, Ohio, who always seems to have an item in stock that is perfectly suited to any customer. The prices are surprisingly low, considering the merchandise – such as a rare Sandy Koufax baseball card, a picture of Elvis Presley, a carnival glass lampshade, and a fragment of petrified wood stated to be from Noah's Ark – but he expects each customer to also play a "prank" on someone else in town. Each customer enters a trance and becomes highly agreeable when making a deal with Gaunt, afterwards forgetting anything abnormal about the encounter. Gaunt has complete knowledge of the long-standing private histories and conflicts between the various townspeople, and the pranks are his means of forcing them to escalate.

Gaunt quickly marks local Sheriff Alan Pangborn and Polly Chalmers, Alan's sweetheart and proprietor of a local sewing shop, as being the most likely to question and interfere with him. Gaunt avoids Alan and offers Polly an ancient charm that relieves the terrible arthritic pain in her hands, as well as giving Gaunt control over her. Local boy Brian Rusk vandalizes the home of Wilma Jerzyck, who loathes Nettie Cobb, Polly's housekeeper, and alcoholic Hugh Priest kills Nettie's dog. Nettie and Wilma then kill each other with knives in a public confrontation, increasing tensions in town.

Other rivalries begin to fester, spurred by the personal motives and secrets of the people involved. Gaunt hires petty criminal John "Ace" Merrill as his assistant, providing him with high-quality cocaine and hinting at buried treasure that could relieve the debt he owes to drug dealers. Ace's first assignment is to retrieve crates of pistols, ammunition, and blasting caps from a garage in Boston; Gaunt soon begins to sell the pistols to his customers so they can protect their purchases.

The truth is eventually revealed: for centuries, Gaunt has tricked people into buying worthless junk that magically appears to be whatever they treasure or desire most. They then become so paranoid about keeping their items safe that they eagerly buy up the weapons that he offers, until the whole town is caught up in madness and violence. Ace begins to suspect the supernatural background of his new employer, but Gaunt keeps him in line through intimidation and promises of revenge against Alan and Castle Rock.

During a rash of suicides, assaults, and violent deaths, town selectman Danforth "Buster" Keeton (who has been secretly embezzling from public funds to fuel his gambling addiction) kills his wife and is then recruited by Ace to work for Gaunt. The two men plant dynamite all over town, using the caps Ace brought back. Alan sets out to kill Ace, led by Gaunt to believe him responsible for the car accident that killed his wife and son. Polly realizes the evil of the charm she bought and destroys it. Deputy Norris Ridgewick attempts suicide, realizing that his prank on Priest has led to a fatal shootout, but decides to go to the police station to help. As the bombs explode, Buster is wounded by Norris and is put out of his misery by Ace. Taking Polly hostage, Ace demands that Alan hand over a hoard of buried cash he allegedly stole. Norris shoots and kills Ace, leaving Alan to face off against Gaunt.

Using sleight of hand and magic novelties that suddenly come to life, Alan forces Gaunt back and grabs his valise, which contains the souls of his customers. Gaunt flees the scene, his car turning into a horse-drawn wagon (with the words CAVEAT EMPTOR – "Let the buyer beware" – written on the side), and the survivors are left to ponder an uncertain future. The novel ends as it begins, in first-person direct address indicating that a new and mysterious shop called "Answered Prayers" is about to open in a small Iowa town – ominously implying that Gaunt is ready to begin his business cycle again.

== Characters ==
- Alan Pangborn: the Sheriff of Castle Rock and the main protagonist. He appeared in The Dark Half, another novel by King. He quits his job as sheriff at the end of the novel.
- Leland Gaunt: Presumably a demon in human form (implied in the film to be Satan), who has spent centuries traveling about the world and tricking people into selling their souls to him, usually in exchange for useless objects disguised as the things they want most. Gaunt's plans are ultimately thwarted and he is forced to leave Castle Rock without the souls he collected.
- Brian Rusk: An 11-year-old boy who becomes the first customer of "Needful Things", buying a rare Sandy Koufax baseball card. Brian's prank leads to the death of Nettie and Wilma. Brian is overcome with guilt, sinking into depression. Brian ultimately shoots himself with his father's gun in front of his little brother Sean, warning Sean to stay out of "Needful Things".
- Patricia "Polly" Chalmers: known as the town's most eccentric woman, Polly was originally a Castle Rock native but the residents consider her an "out-of-towner" after she lives in San Francisco for years before returning. She has arthritis which causes severe pain in her hands. After she accepts a magical amulet from Gaunt that relieves her pain, she becomes susceptible to his influence and is turned against Alan by fabricated evidence that he investigated the death of the infant child she had in San Francisco. Polly is able to realize Alan is innocent, destroys the amulet and the spider creature inside it, and convinces Alan not to kill Ace.
- Norris Ridgewick: one of the town's deputies and Sheriff Pangborn's closest ally. He buys a Bazun fishing rod from Gaunt in exchange for a prank on Hugh Priest, leading to the deaths of both Priest and Henry Beaumont. Ridgewick is assaulted by Keeton, then attempts suicide, but after realizing how worthless his fishing rod is plays a key role in Gaunt's defeat. Later books reveal that he would take Pangborn's place as sheriff of Castle Rock
- John "Ace" Merrill: the town's resident "bad boy" and petty criminal, who is back after time in prison. Gaunt hires Ace into his service, and manipulates him into deciding to kill Alan. Ace is ultimately shot dead by Ridgewick when he goes after Polly, his death not being noticed by Alan or Gaunt. Merrill also appears in King's novella The Body.
- Danforth "Buster" Keeton: the town's head selectman, who often uses the authority of his office to intimidate others. He is also a secret gambling addict who has embezzled funds from the town. Keeton has paranoid delusions, believing that a group known as "They" are out to get him. Keeton is mortally wounded by a gunshot from Norris, and Ace finishes him off with a headshot.
- Wilma Jerzyck: The town bully and first victim of one of Mr. Gaunt's pranks, performed by Brian Rusk, which starts the cycle. Wilma is a cruel woman, often starting fights and begins tormenting Nettie after the prank. Wilma and Nettie both attack and kill each other.
- Netitia "Nettie" Cobb: Polly's best friend and housekeeper, and enemy of Wilma Jerzyck. Nettie is mentally unstable, having killed her abusive husband. Nettie is implied to develop a crush on Gaunt, and is ultimately killed when she attacks Wilma for killing her dog (a deed actually committed by Hugh Priest).
- Myrtle Keeton: Lonely wife of Buster Keeton. Myrtle buys a porcelain doll from Mr. Gaunt. Myrtle is ultimately beaten to death by a deranged Keeton with a hammer.
- Hugh Priest: Local drunk who purchases a foxtail from Gaunt. Priest kills Nettie's dog Raider for a prank, and spirals into madness. Priest is killed in a firefight with Henry Beaumont.
- Henry Beaumont: Owner of the local bar; incurs Hugh's wrath after refusing to serve him any more alcohol one night and then taking his car keys because he was too drunk to drive home. He and Hugh kill each other in a shootout at the bar.
- Sally Ratcliffe: A speech teacher and a deeply religious woman, who buys a wooden splinter from Gaunt that is supposedly a remnant of Noah's Ark. She later hangs herself out of guilt after taking part in the town-wide pranks and discovering that her fiancé has supposedly cheated on her with another woman.

== Relation to other King works ==
In the notes to Nightmares & Dreamscapes, King suggested that his short story "It Grows on You" (originally written in 1973, and published in revised format in 1993) could serve as a sequel to Needful Things.

== Film adaptation ==
In 1993, a film adaptation of King's book directed by Fraser C. Heston and starring Max von Sydow, Ed Harris, Bonnie Bedelia and J. T. Walsh was released in theaters. It received generally negative reviews from critics, with an overall rating of 32% on Rotten Tomatoes.

== In popular culture ==
- The Rick and Morty episode "Something Ricked This Way Comes" (2014) features the Devil as the proprietor of a store named Needful Things, which sells cursed items.
- Gaunter O'Dimm, a character in The Witcher 3: Wild Hunt (2015) and its expansion pack Hearts of Stone, is based in part on Leland Gaunt. Like Gaunt, Gaunter O'Dimm is a supernatural entity who takes delight in granting "wishes" that cause suffering among mortals.
- The title of Stranger Things (2016–2025) was chosen as it sounded similar to Needful Things, while the show's logo took inspiration from the front page of King's novel Firestarter (1980).

== See also ==
- 1991 in literature
