= Drunken Fireworks =

Audiobook by Stephen King

- Audiobook cover image
- Author: Stephen King
- Audio read by: Tim Sample
- Genre: Humor
- Publisher: Simon & Schuster Audio
- Publication date: June 30, 2015
- Publication place: United States
- Media type: Audio
- Pages: 31 (in The Bazaar of Bad Dreams)
- ISBN: 978-1-4423-8964-9
- 1:20:07 runtime

Drunken Fireworks is an audiobook novella written by Stephen King and read by Tim Sample released in June 2015. It is a humorous story that predominantly takes the form of a police statement given by the protagonist, Alden McCausland, to the Castle County police chief Andy Clutterbuck, followed by a closing conversation between Alden and the officers present. The story follows the McCauslands coming into "new money" and a developing yearly competition of one-upmanship dubbed the "Fourth of July arms race" with their old money neighbors across the lake, the Massimos, who may or may not be "connected". What starts as a friendly, competitive fireworks display competition escalates each year until it ends in disaster.

The story was later published in print form as part of King's collection The Bazaar of Bad Dreams in November 2015.

== Plot ==
At the Castle County police station, Alden McCausland, a blue-collar mechanic, recounts the events leading up to the night before. Years ago, McCausland's father purchased a cabin on Abenaki Lake as a second home. Being on the run-down west side, it was a fixer-upper from the start. Even after it was paid off, the family couldn't afford to fix it up much, and then Alden's father died. Alden and "Ma" later received a substantial life insurance settlement, followed by a $250,000 (equivalent to $340,000 in 2025) winning scratch-off ticket. Over time they fixed up the cabin, left their jobs in town, and moved in permanently—as well as drinking more frequently.

The Massimo family had a mansion on the east side of the lake opposite the McCauslands called Twelve Pines Camp. Ma claimed that they were "connected" and real rich through ill-gotten gains instead of "accident rich" like the McCauslands. When Paul Massimo brought his family to town, they filled up their place. The Massimos knew how to have fun with cookouts, football games, singing and a fair amount of drinking themselves. One of the older boys in the family looked a little like Ben Affleck and carried a trumpet on his hip. He played the trumpet along with their songs, and closed each night by playing "Taps". Ma hated the trumpet and didn't think he was very good, once saying, "Dizzy Gillespie he ain't. Someone ought to dip that trumpet in olive oil and stick it up his ass. He could fart out 'God Bless America.'"

The year 2012 was the start of what became the "Fourth of July arms race". Alden purchased some sparklers, firecrackers and cherry bombs from Pop Anderson at his local flea mart. After opening the Fourth of July celebration with some drinks, Alden and Ma lit up their sparklers and waved them around. The young Massimo children across the lake got excited and asked for their own sparklers, which seemed to burn brighter and longer than the McCausland's, prompting the trumpeter to blow out—wah-wah—seeming to boast the fact. This angered Ma, who wanted to set off their firecrackers to step up. The Massimos matched with even more firecrackers set off by all the children, followed by another trumpeted—"waah waah—Try again." Confident the cherry bombs would out-do them, Ma lit them off only to be outdone by a pair of M-80 booms, and another three blasts: "Waaaah ... waaaah ... waaaah." Ma and Alden looked at each other and agreed to get them next year.

== Reception ==
The novella was reviewed by AudioFile, Publishers Weekly, Portland Press Herald, Sarasota Herald-Tribune, and Bev Vincent at Cemetery Dance Publications.

== Adaptation ==
At one point, a film adaptation was in development, optioned by Rabbit Bandini Productions and Rubicon Entertainment. The announcement came in June 2016, with James Franco set to star at the time.
