= Screaming Tunnel =

Tunnel in Ontario, Canada

Coordinates: 43.14518°N 79.14497°W

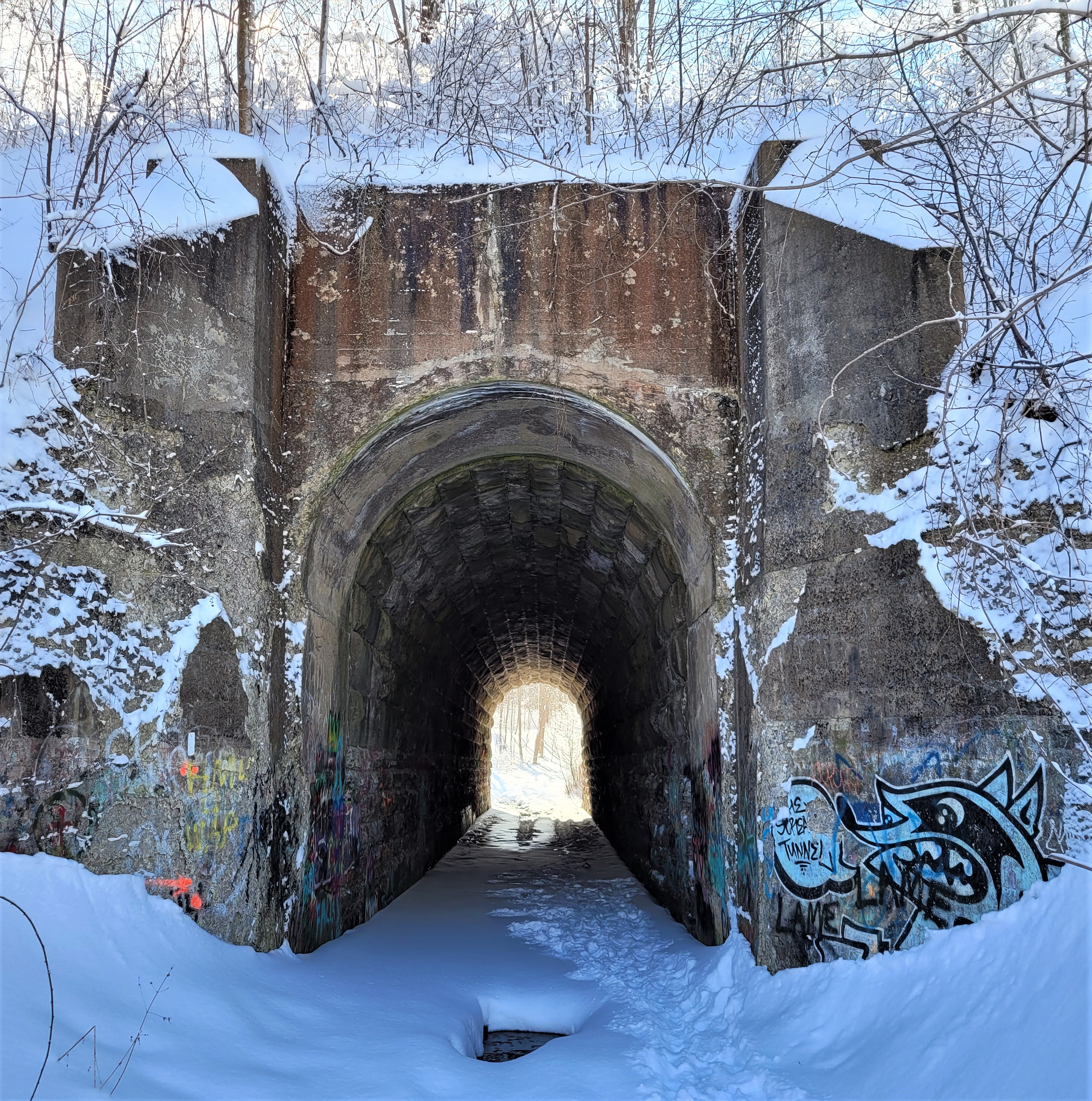
Screaming Tunnel-Southern Entrance

The Screaming Tunnel is a small limestone tunnel, running underneath what once was a Grand Trunk Railway line (now the Canadian National Railway). It is located in the northwest corner of Niagara Falls, Ontario, Canada. It was originally built for a North to South line for the Grand Trunk Railway, which was never built. The tunnel was abandoned and used as drainage tunnel so the water could be removed from the farmlands nearby. This water would go underneath the Grand Trunk Railway and down to the valley below. Throughout the 20th century, farmers used this tunnel to transport goods and animals safely underneath the busy railroad above.

The tunnel, constructed at some point in the 19th century, is 16 feet (4.9 m) in height and 125 feet (38 m) long. The Bruce Trail passes through it.

A local legend recounts that the tunnel is haunted by the ghost of a young woman whose clothing had caught fire. She died in the tunnel trying to find the nearest house. All versions of these legends end with the girl's screams filling up the tunnel as she was burning to death.

The tunnel was used as a set during the filming of David Cronenberg's 1983 film adaptation of Stephen King's horror novel The Dead Zone.
