= John L. Adams =

American actor (born 1970)

- Born: December 4, 1973 (age 52); Winston-Salem, North Carolina, United States
- Education: Winston-Salem State University
- Occupations: Actor, director, comedian
- Years active: 2000-present
- Notable work: The Dead Zone

John L. Adams (born 4 December 1973) is an American actor, comedian and director. He is most notable for his role as Bruce Lewis on Stephen King's The Dead Zone.

== Biography ==
Adams was born 4 December 1973 in Winston-Salem, North Carolina. He attended Winston-Salem State University before travelling to California to pursue a career in standup comedy. He continued to primarily do comedy until he signed a deal with NBC in 2000 to appear on Just Deal as Mr. Peña. From 2002 to 2007, he starred as Bruce Lewis in The Dead Zone with Anthony Michael Hall.

== Filmography ==
| Year | Title | Role | Notes |
|---|---|---|---|
| 2000 | Just Deal | Mr. Peña | 10 episodes |
| 2000 | Pacific Blue | | 1 episode |
| 2001-2002 | Girlfriends | Vosco | 7 episodes |
| 2002 | NYPD Blue | Shawn Tomlinson | 1 episode |
| 2002-2007 | The Dead Zone | Bruce Lewis | Recurring character |
| 2004 | CSI: Crime Scene Investigation | Manny | 1 episode |
| 2006 | NCIS | Seth Patterson | 1 episode |
| 2023 | Wolf Pack | David Lang | 5 episodes |
