= Johnny Smith (The Dead Zone) =

- Walken portraying Smith
- Created by: Stephen King (novel); Michael Piller (TV adaptation)
- Portrayed by: Christopher Walken (film); Anthony Michael Hall (TV series); Evan Smith (as a child, TV series); Kai-Read Friedman (as a child, TV series)

In-universe information
- Full name: John Smith
- Occupation: Psychic detective Former schoolteacher Tutor
- Family: Herbert Smith (father); Vera Smith (mother); J.J. Bannerman (son in TV series)

John Smith is a fictional character and the protagonist of Stephen King's 1979 novel The Dead Zone. He possesses psychic abilities that allow him to see moments of the future and past, usually triggered by touching objects or a person related to that future. He is portrayed by Christopher Walken in the 1983 film and Anthony Michael Hall in the 2002 television series. Paste Magazine has ranked Johnny Smith the sixth out of eight creepiest Christopher Walken performances.

In the novel, the "dead zone" is the part of Johnny Smith's brain that is damaged beyond repair, causing dormant parts to awaken in order to compensate, leading to psychic abilities; when information in his visions is obstructed, Johnny says it exists in the dead zone. In the movie adaptation starring Walken, a "dead zone" is a blind spot that only appears in precognitive visions, representing that the future can be altered. In the TV series starring Hall, the "dead zone" is not his brain damage but instead the previously dormant part of Johnny's brain that awakens and activates his psychic abilities.

== Novel ==
In 1953, Johnny Smith is six years old when he suffers a head injury and immediately has a psychic vision of the near future, an event he barely even remembers as an adult. As an adult in 1971, Johnny Smith is an English teacher living in Cleaves Mills, nearby the fictional town of Castle Rock in Maine. After a date with his girlfriend Sarah at a county fair, he is involved in a car crash. His injuries leave him in a coma for four and a half years. Desperate for hope, his mother Vera becomes intensely religious, believing prayer will bring her son back.

On May 17, 1975, Johnny regains consciousness. Medical testing reveals a minor part of his brain suffered permanent damage. As if to compensate for the damage, a long-dormant part of his brain has become active. When Johnny touches certain people or objects, he now sometimes experiences psychic visions relating to them, revealing either hidden truths about their past, dangers in their future, or situations happening in the present that are connected to them. His visions have limitations and parts of them are often clouded. Johnny refers to this obstructed information as existing in the damaged part of his brain, "the dead zone."

Initially hoping to use his powers to help others, such as warning a woman that her kitchen is on fire, Johnny eventually denies their existence and is relieved when a tabloid reporter, with whom he refused to co-operate, decides to label him a fraud. Johnny then reluctantly uses his power again when Sheriff George Bannerman seeks assistance in tracking the Castle Rock Strangler, a serial killer. After finding the killer, Johnny is again a subject of interest to news media. He is unable to return to his old teaching job on the grounds that he is now "too controversial" to be an educator. He goes into semi-retirement, taking a job as a private tutor. Sometime later, he meets rising politician Greg Stillson. As a result, Johnny foresees a nuclear apocalypse that Stillson will directly cause if he goes on to become president.

Reluctant to resort to murder, Johnny's hand is forced when he discovers that he has developed a terminal tumor. With no hope of gathering evidence to expose Stillson's threat in the time left to him, Johnny instead attempts to shoot him at a public event. Johnny fails and is fatally wounded by Stillson's security detail, but not before the politician is photographed attempting to use a nearby child as a human shield. Grabbing Stillson's leg, Johnny dies knowing that he has succeeded in preventing Stillson from ever becoming president.

The 1983 movie adaptation of The Dead Zone is mainly faithful to the novel but does include some changes. In the movie, Johnny explains that visions of the future include a "blank spot" or "dead zone" and his doctor concludes this represents that the future is not set and can be altered.

== Television series ==
In the television series The Dead Zone, Johnny is introduced in the pilot episode, "Wheel of Fortune (Part 1)". Born John Robert Smith in 1967, this version of Johnny is a high school science teacher in Cleaves Mills High near Bangor and engaged to be married to Sarah Anne Bracknell, whom he has known since childhood. A horrific car crash on June 6, 1995 puts Johnny into a coma for six-years. Told that Johnny will never wake up, his mother Vera loses faith in God and later dies. Sarah marries local Penobscot County Sheriff Walter T. Bannerman. The two are raising Johnny and Sarah's son JJ (the boy is unaware of his true father's identity). On September 1, 2001, rising politician Greg Stillson is sworn in as a state representative. At the moment Stillson takes his oath, Johnny awakens from his coma, saying, "Something's wrong."

Johnny quickly discovers he now has psychic visions that can be triggered by physical contact. His doctor tells him that a dormant portion of his brain, an area one might normally consider a "dead zone" of the brain, now seems to be active and may be responsible for his powers. Johnny and Sarah reunite and he learns he has a son. Sarah wants JJ to come to know and love Johnny, hoping to eventually explain their connection to the child. Sarah is conflicted about her feelings for Johnny, while Johnny is torn between hoping Sarah will leave her husband and thinking he should move on with his life. His physical therapist Bruce Lewis also becomes his confidant and best friend as he tries to resume a normal life in Bangor.

Driven to action by visions of death and crime, Johnny repeatedly uses his power to aid Sheriff Bannerman, and the two develop a grudging respect for each other. On many of his adventures, Johnny is aided by Bruce Lewis, who helps ground him and offers emotional support. Unlike his novel and movie counterparts, Johnny is able to increasingly accept his powers over time and become more comfortable with their use, though he still dislikes public attention and resents strangers believing he can solve all their problems. In the first season episode "Shaman," Johnny has a vision of a Native American shaman who had similar abilities centuries before and realizes he is not the first one to have this gift. By holding onto the shaman's personal item, Johnny is able to send messages into the past during moments the shaman also held the object. Johnny realizes he can preserve or alter the past by communicating with and influencing another "dead zone" psychic. In the season two episode "The Hunt", Johnny learns the U.S. government employs other psychics to help with counter-terrorist operations; he aids them for a short time.

During the first two seasons of the show, Johnny has a casual relationship with local journalist Dana Bright. In season three, he has a more serious relationship with therapist and psychiatrist Rebecca Caldwell, though this ends at the beginning of season four. In the fourth-season episode "Double Vision", Johnny meets another psychic named Alex Sinclair who has experienced metaphorical visions since childhood. The two feel a romantic connection but fear their combined psychic abilities will only too much stress for a relationship. They meet again on different adventures.

During the first season, Johnny is haunted by visions of a dark tower surrounded by flames. After encountering politician Greg Stillson in the season 1 finale, his vision becomes clearer and he realizes that the dark tower he sees is actually an ash-covered version of the Washington Monument that exists in a possible future where Stillson has caused an apocalypse on Earth. Johnny's quest to stop "armageddon" becomes the ongoing subplot of the series during his other adventures, and he later shares his vision of the future and his fear of Stillson with Bruce. In the season two finale "Vision," Johnny learns he can sometimes communicate with Christopher Wey, a man who will become a "dead zone" psychic in the future when he wakes up from a coma after the apocalypse has happened. As with the shaman, Wey communicates with Johnny in the "past" by touching a personal object, the head of Johnny's cane. Eventually, Wey works alongside future versions of Johnny and JJ who are hoping to change their reality by sending messages into the past.

In the season two episode "Zion", Johnny's power temporarily activates Bruce's dead zone. Rather than a vision of the past or future, Bruce experiences a timeline where he never left his home and so never met Johnny. This alternate timeline resembles the canon of the novel and movie, showing Johnny as a suspicious and unsocial loner who attempts to publicly assassinate Stillson. Bruce is shocked by Johnny's attitude and behavior in this version of events, saying, "This is the you that would have been had I not been there for you." Before the vision ends, Bruce sees Johnny fail to kill Stillson and in turn be gunned down by the man's security detail. Bruce then has a vision of his father telling him that his destiny is to protect Johnny Smith.

After six seasons, The Dead Zone was canceled without resolving whether or not Johnny would prevent the apocalypse. In the final episode, Johnny learns his father had psychic abilities. The same episode depicts JJ suffering a minor head injury and then experiencing a vision in his eye of the apocalypse when Greg Stillson touches him (a vision Johnny experiences in his own eye simultaneously elsewhere). JJ tells his parents only that he saw something "terrible" when he touched Stillson, and the last scene of the episode shows Johnny preparing to discuss it further.
