= The Dead Zone (TV series) =

2002 science fiction drama television series

- Genre: Science fiction; Thriller; Drama
- Created by: Michael Piller; Shawn Piller
- Based on: Characters from The Dead Zone by Stephen King
- Starring: Anthony Michael Hall; Nicole de Boer; Chris Bruno; John L. Adams; Connor Price
- Opening theme: "New Year's Prayer" by Jeff Buckley (seasons 1–3) "Dead Zone Epic" by Blues Saraceno (seasons 4–6)
- Countries of origin: United States; Canada
- Original language: English
- No. of seasons: 6
- No. of episodes: 80 (list of episodes)

Production
- Producer: Peter Lhotka ("Wheel of Fortune (Part 1)" – "What It Seems (Part 2)")
- Running time: 45 minutes
- Production companies: Crescent Entertainment (seasons 1–3); Lionsgate Television; The Segan Company (seasons 1–5); Modern Entertainment (seasons 1–3); Piller² Productions / The Piller/Segan Company; Paramount Network Television (seasons 1–5); CBS Paramount Network Television (season 6); Dead Zone Production Company

Original release
- Network: USA Network
- Release: June 16, 2002 – September 16, 2007

The Dead Zone, also known as Stephen King's The Dead Zone (in the United States) is a science fiction drama television series starring Anthony Michael Hall as Johnny Smith, who discovers he has developed psychic abilities after a coma in six years. The show, credited as "based on characters" from Stephen King's 1979 novel, first aired in 2002, and was produced by Lionsgate Television and Paramount Network Television (later CBS Paramount Network Television) for the USA Network.

The show was originally commissioned for UPN, but the network dropped the show and it was picked up by USA. The series was filmed in Vancouver, British Columbia, Canada, for its first five seasons. The sixth and last season was billed as "the season that changes everything" and production was moved to Montreal.

The Dead Zone was expected to be renewed for a seventh season, but due to financial concerns and fear of low ratings on the part of the producers, the series was cancelled on a major cliffhanger in December 2007 without a series finale. Syfy was rumored to possibly pick up the series after it was cancelled by USA, but it did not occur.

== Plot ==
Small-town teacher Johnny Smith is involved in a car accident that leaves him comatose for about six years. After regaining consciousness, Johnny begins having visions of the past and future triggered by touching items or people; doctors attribute the visions to activity in a previously unused "dead zone" of his brain that is attempting to compensate for the impaired function of the portions injured in the accident. Johnny also learns that his fiancée, Sarah, gave birth to his son in the interim following the accident, but has since married another man.

With the help of Sarah, her husband (and town sheriff) Walt Bannerman, and physical therapist Bruce, Johnny begins using his abilities to help solve crimes. His attempts to do good, though, are complicated by intermittent visions of apocalyptic events brought about following the future election of congressional candidate Greg Stillson.

== Cast and characters ==
The cast of The Dead Zone

=== Main ===
- Anthony Michael Hall—John Robert "Johnny" Smith
- Nicole de Boer—Sarah Anne Bracknell-Bannerman
- John L. Adams—Bruce Lewis (seasons 1–5, main; guest star season 6)
- Chris Bruno—Sheriff Walter T. "Walt" Bannerman (seasons 1–5, main; guest star season 6)
- Connor Price—John "Johnny"/"JJ" Bannerman/Smith (season 6)

=== Recurring ===
- David Ogden Stiers—Rev. Eugene "Gene" Purdy
- Bill Mondy—Deputy Roscoe
- Sean Patrick Flanery—Greg Stillson
- Garry Chalk—James Stillson (seasons 1–4)
- Spencer Achtymichuk—John "Johnny"/"JJ" Bannerman (seasons 1–5)
- Kristen Dalton—Dana Bright (seasons 1–2, 5)
- Frank Whaley—Christopher Wey (seasons 2–3)
- Sarah Wynter—Rebecca Caldwell (seasons 1–4)
- Martin Donovan—Malcolm Janus (seasons 4–6)
- Laura Harris—Miranda Ellis (seasons 4–5)
- Jennifer Finnigan—Alexandra "Alex" Sinclair (seasons 4 and 6)
- Cara Buono—Acting Sheriff Anna Turner (season 6)
- Grant L. Roberts—Big Man (season 6)

=== Characters ===
- Johnny Smith (played by Anthony Michael Hall) is a retired schoolteacher who, as a result of a car accident, has developed psychic abilities. An encounter with a carnival trickster in the first episode (before the car accident) makes it clear Johnny already has some psychic abilities, but after the coma, their nature changes from intuition to visions, the latter requiring urgent action, even when personally inconvenient, whereas earlier, Johnny only uses his ability on a carnival trickster to amuse his fiancée Sarah. Whenever he undergoes one of his visions in his eye, Johnny has shown to be capable of manipulating the time localized around the vision, allowing him to stop, slow, reverse, or forward the time relative to himself within the vision, leaving him as the only one aware of his temporal alterations within it, thus allowing him to further examine the details from the past, future, and occasionally the present.
- Sarah Bracknell Bannerman (played by Nicole de Boer) is Johnny's former fiancée and the mother of his son, J.J. Sarah married Walt Bannerman during Johnny's coma, and the two are raising J.J. together. Sarah knew Johnny when they were children, and later taught at the same school as he did. Sarah's mother died when she was a teenager, which strained her relationship with her father. At the end of season 5, Sarah was pregnant with Walt's child. At the beginning of season 6, she gives birth to Walt's daughter and names her "Hope".
- Sheriff Walt Bannerman (played by Chris Bruno) initially has a very rocky relationship with Johnny, who often feels that Walt stole Sarah from him. Since then, as Johnny displays his powers more and more often in law enforcement situations, Johnny becomes an asset to Walt, and the two become friends. The name Walt Bannerman is a combination of the names George Bannerman and Walt Hazlett; in the novel, George Bannerman was the sheriff, and Walt Hazlett was the man Sarah married. At the beginning of season 6, Walt is killed in a fire at the Faith Heritage Chapel, but he continued to pop up throughout the season in visions and flashbacks, and even briefly as a ghost.
- Bruce Lewis (played by John L. Adams) is a physiotherapist who helps Johnny regain his strength after his coma. Bruce is an open-minded spiritual person as a result of a religious upbringing by his pastor father. He is Johnny's best friend and frequently his voice of reason, and may very well be the reason for the divergence in this series when compared to the novel or 1983 movie (Johnny never tried to kill Greg Stillson before the election). An episode in season 2 even featured a vision of an alternate reality where instead of being a physical therapist, Bruce was a reverend who never met Johnny after waking up from his coma. Thus, with the absence of his guidance, this version of Johnny became unstable, deranged, and driven mad by his abilities.
- Rev. Gene Purdy (played by David Ogden Stiers), another original character in the series, is a religious leader and head of a prestigious university and foundations funded by Vera Smith, Johnny's mother. Johnny always speculated that Purdy's interest in Vera was for financial gain, but his powers allowed him to discover that Purdy had been in love with Vera for more than 35 years. Upon Vera's suicide over the grief of the loss of her son, Purdy covered up the incident and made everyone believe she died of a heart attack, thus preserving her dignity in the public eye. Purdy has long been involved with somewhat shady dealings, but is always in the constant service of God. His devotion sometimes clouds his judgment, and he has even gone as far as to cover up a murder to protect better interests. At the end of the season-six premiere "Heritage", Purdy leaves Cleaves Mills after being involved in a fire that killed Walt Bannerman and Malcolm Janus at the Faith Heritage Chapel.
- Dana Bright (played by Kristen Dalton) is a journalist for the Bangor Daily News. Dana covered much of Johnny's early work, and later became romantically linked with him; she was also in a relationship with Gene Purdy. She left the show for some time, and her absence was not explained until the season 5 episode "Articles of Faith". Because of her coverage of Johnny, Dana was able to move on up to reporting for a Boston television station, choosing her career ambitions above her increasingly complex relationship with Johnny. At the end of that episode when she leaves, both are shown to harbor, to some degree, feelings for each other.
- Greg Stillson (played by Sean Patrick Flanery) is a mentally unstable politician who has taken many illegal steps to secure an election. Upon meeting with Johnny Smith, Stillson clearly would become responsible for an apocalyptic event that Johnny has seen in his visions and is trying to prevent. After the death of Malcolm Janus (see below), Johnny's visions of a Stillson-created apocalypse ceased, but after some further revelations, they returned at the end of the season.
- Deputy Roscoe (played by Bill Mondy) is a deputy who works for Walt. Roscoe is usually first on the scene and very dependable.
- Johnny "J.J." Bannerman (played by Spencer Achtymichuk (seasons 1–5) and Connor Price (season 6)) is the biological son of Johnny and Sarah. Sarah was pregnant when Johnny had his accident, and she ultimately married Walt, who raised J.J. as his own son. As of the third season, Walt and Sarah have told J.J. that Johnny is his biological father, and Johnny has taken on more fatherly duties. In the season-six episode "Big Top", Johnny starts to believe that J.J. has inherited his powers, but J.J. appears to be covering up his innate abilities. In the series finale, J.J. has his first actual vision when he sees Armageddon in the pupil of his eye sharing it within Johnny's eye during a scuffle with Greg Stillson.
- Malcolm Janus (played by Martin Donovan) is a power broker who believes that Greg Stillson is "destined for great things". His ultimate goal is to place Stillson in the White House. He also gave Reverend Purdy a global sphere of influence, in return for financial support of Stillson's campaigns. Janus is apparently a member of the Illuminati, as he wears a ring with their symbol. At the beginning of season-six episode "Heritage", Janus is killed in self-defense by Purdy at the Faith Heritage Chapel.
- Christopher Wey (played by Frank Whaley) is a man from the future who has been comatose since 2003. He wakes after the apocalypse to discover that he has a "dead zone" similar to Johnny's, and that he can communicate with the present-day Johnny when both are in contact with the head of his cane. Wey is revealed to be in league with a future Johnny Smith and J.J.
- Rebecca Caldwell (played by Sarah Wynter) is a child psychiatrist who met Johnny during his investigation of the murder of her sister Rachel. Rebecca became Johnny's girlfriend, and at one time, found out that Greg Stillson may have been responsible for her sister's murder and will be responsible for the upcoming apocalypse. As of the third-season finale, she has purchased a gun in an attempt to assassinate Stillson. Rebecca was stopped by Johnny and discovered that Stillson did not kill Rachel. She left Johnny, seeking to sort things out for herself.
- Alex Sinclair (played by Jennifer Finnigan) is a female psychic who discovered her "dead zone" when she was stung by a swarm of bees (presumably "killer bees") as a child and became hyperallergic to bee stings and products. Alex first appears in the fourth-season episode "Double Vision", where she and Johnny track down a sniper together. At the end of the episode, Johnny and she clearly have developed feelings for each other, but she decides that she is not ready to pursue the relationship. Alex does later appear in the fourth-season Christmas episode "A Very Dead Zone Christmas", where the idea of Johnny and her getting together is further explored.
- Anna Turner (played by Cara Buono) is the sheriff pro tem of Penobscot County; Anna investigated the final unofficial case of the recently deceased Sheriff Walt Bannerman.

== Music ==
- In the pilot episode, the music class practices the song "Mr. Sandman". In the same episode, Johnny and Sarah make out in his car to "Sleep Walk", a song by Santo & Johnny, which also featured in the Stephen King movie Sleepwalkers.
- The theme song from seasons 1–3 is "New Year's Prayer" by Jeff Buckley.
- The new theme song since season 4 is "Dead Zone Epic" by Blues Saraceno.
- The promos for season 4 featured the song "Brace Yourself" by Howie Day.
- The promos for season 5 featured the song "By My Side" by INXS.
- The promos for season 6 featured the song "Touch Me" by The Doors.

== Home media ==
Lionsgate Home Entertainment has released all six seasons of The Dead Zone on DVD in Region 1, while CBS Home Entertainment (distributed by Paramount) has also released all six seasons in Region 2.

On June 26, 2012, Lionsgate Home Entertainment released a complete series set on DVD in Canada only, while Paramount also released it in Europe.

In Australia, all six seasons had been released on DVD from 2006 to 2009. Madman Entertainment/Via Vision Entertainment has obtained the rights to the series and released a complete series box set on January 6, 2021.

The entire series is available on demand in the United States on YouTube and the Pluto TV app.

The series on DVD has the episode order based on the production order rather than the order in which the episodes were aired on TV.

DVD name	Ep #	Region 1	Region 2	Region 4	Additional information (Region 1 DVDs only)
Season 1	13	June 17, 2003	January 30, 2006	March 16, 2006	"Behind the Scenes: Genesis" - The creators of the series explain how The Dead Zone came to be.; "Writing" -A featurette, it takes viewers inside meetings with the writing staff as they outline each episode.; "Music and Special Effects"- An in-depth tour of The Dead Zone's amazing visual effects; Never-before-seen interviews with various guest stars; Commentary on all 13 episodes; Storyboards
Season 2	19	June 8, 2004	May 1, 2006	May 4, 2006	Production commentary for all 19 episodes; "The Kaking of an Episode"; Cast and crew interviews; Never-before-seen interviews with directors and guest stars; Deleted scenes; Storyboards
Season 3	12	June 7, 2005	February 12, 2007	January 11, 2007	Commentaries for all 12 episodes; Featurettes: "HD Conversion" and "Wacky Caterers"; Deleted scenes; Short film ("Five Minutes 'til Mitch") directed by John L. Adams with introduction
Season 4	12	June 13, 2006	July 23, 2007	September 6, 2007	The production design of The Dead Zone featurette; Audio commentaries; Deleted scenes
Season 5	11	June 5, 2007	July 13, 2009	July 10, 2008	"The Other Side of the Camera" explores the directorial debut of series stars Chris Bruno and John L. Adams.; "A Day with JLA?" is a guided tour of a typical day on set with series star John L. Adams.; Audio commentaries
Season 6	13	June 3, 2008	March 22, 2010	December 24, 2009	"A New Home for The Dead Zone"; "All Aboard: Filming The Dead Zone"; Audio commentary on four episodes
Complete Series	80	June 26, 2012	N/A	January 6, 2021	same as individual seasons

== Ratings ==
The first season averaged 6.4 million viewers, while season four averaged 3.4 million and season six averaged 2.1 million. The series premiere scored 6.4 million viewers, holding the record for highest premiere on USA Network, until bested by The 4400 premiere, which drew 7.4 million viewers.

== See also ==
- Seeing Things—Canadian TV series
