= Elevation (novella) =

Novella by Stephen King

- First edition cover
- Author: Stephen King
- Language: English
- Genre: Literary fiction Drama
- Published: October 30, 2018
- Publisher: Scribner
- Publication place: United States
- Media type: Print (hardcover)
- Pages: 144
- ISBN: 978-1-982102-31-9

Elevation is a suspense novel by American author Stephen King, published on October 30, 2018, by Scribner. The book contains chapter-heading illustrations by Mark Edward Geyer, who previously illustrated King's first editions of Rose Madder and The Green Mile.

== Plot summary ==
In Castle Rock, Maine, Scott Carey faces a mysterious illness which causes bizarre effects on his body and makes him rapidly lose weight, even if he appears healthy on the outside. While battling this disease with his trusted doctor, he also tries fixing a dire situation involving a lesbian couple trying to open a restaurant surrounded by a disapproving public.

== Publication ==
King announced Elevation in an interview with Entertainment Weekly on December 22, 2017. While talking about his recent novella Gwendy's Button Box, King said, "I've written another novella called Elevation, which is also a Castle Rock story and, in some ways, it's almost like a sequel to Gwendy. Sometimes you seed the ground, and you get a little fertilizer, and things turn out." A small excerpt as well as the cover for the book were both unveiled by Entertainment Weekly on May 29, 2018. Despite King referring to Elevation as a novella, the book is billed on the cover as a novel.

== Reception ==
Kirkus Reviews called it "A touching fable with a couple of deft political jabs on the way to showing that it might just be possible for us all to get along."

== Film adaptation ==
In an interview with CinemaBlend, filmmaker Jack Bender said he is writing a film adaptation of Elevation.
