= Cujo (film) =

1983 film by Lewis Teague

- Theatrical release poster
- Directed by: Lewis Teague
- Screenplay by: Don Carlos Dunaway; Barbara Turner (Note: Credited as Lauren Currier.)
- Based on: Cujo by Stephen King
- Produced by: Robert Singer; Daniel H. Blatt
- Starring: Dee Wallace; Daniel Hugh-Kelly; Danny Pintauro; Ed Lauter; Christopher Stone
- Cinematography: Jan de Bont
- Edited by: Neil Travis
- Music by: Charles Bernstein
- Production companies: Taft Entertainment Company; Sunn Classic Pictures
- Distributed by: Warner Bros.
- Release date: August 12, 1983
- Running time: 93 minutes
- Country: United States
- Language: English
- Budget: $6 million
- Box office: $21.2 million

Cujo is a 1983 American horror film directed by Lewis Teague, written by Don Carlos Dunaway and Barbara Turner (using the pen name Lauren Currier), and starring Dee Wallace, Daniel Hugh Kelly, and Danny Pintauro. An adaptation of Stephen King's 1981 novel of the same name, it follows a mother and her son who are trapped inside their car while protecting themselves from a rabid St. Bernard.

== Plot ==
Cujo, a friendly and easygoing St. Bernard, chases a wild rabbit and inserts his head into a cave, where a rabid bat bites him on the nose. The Trenton family—advertising executive Vic, housewife Donna, and young son Tad—take their car to the rural home of abusive mechanic Joe Camber for repairs, where they meet Cujo, the Camber family's pet, and get along well with him.

Vic and Donna's marriage is tested when Vic learns that Donna had been having an affair with her ex-boyfriend from high school, Steve Kemp. The early signs of Cujo's infection start to appear, even though no one understands it. Joe Camber's wife, Charity, and his son, Brett, agree to leave for a week to visit Charity's sister in Connecticut. The furious stage of Cujo's infection sets in fast. Cujo refrains from attacking Brett but goes completely delusional and kills the Cambers' alcoholic neighbor, Gary. He then fatally mauls Joe.

Vic goes out of town on a business trip as Donna and Tad return to the Cambers' house for more car repairs. Cujo tries to attack them, and they are forced to take shelter in their Ford Pinto. Donna tries to drive home, but the car's alternator gives out, and the two are trapped inside. The hot sun makes conditions unbearable, and Donna realizes that she must take action before they both die from heatstroke or dehydration.

Attempts at escape are foiled by Cujo repeatedly attacking the car, breaking a window, and biting Donna. Vic returns after his phone calls go unanswered, and finds Donna and Tad missing and his house vandalized by Kemp. Police are certain his wife and son might be at the Cambers'. Local sheriff George Bannerman goes to make an inspection, but Cujo mauls him to death as well.

Donna attempts to get to the house to bring an overheated Tad water; she fights Cujo with a baseball bat until it breaks. Cujo jumps and is impaled in the stomach by the broken bat. Donna takes the sheriff's gun and contemplates shooting the dog, but decides that saving Tad is more important. Inside the house, Cujo tries again to attack them, jumping through a window, but Donna fatally shoots him in the face. Shortly after, Vic arrives and rescues the two.

== Cast ==
- Dee Wallace as Donna Trenton
- Danny Pintauro as Tad Trenton
- Daniel Hugh-Kelly as Vic Trenton
- Christopher Stone as Steve Kemp
- Ed Lauter as Joe Camber
- Kaiulani Lee as Charity Camber
- Billy Jacoby as Brett Camber
- Mills Watson as Gary Pervier
- Jerry Hardin as Masen
- Sandy Ward as Sheriff George Bannerman
- Arthur Rosenberg as Roger Breakstone
- Frank Welker as Cujo (vocal effects)

== Production ==
Principal photography of Cujo took place mainly on a cattle ranch on Sonoma Mountain near Petaluma, California in the fall of 1982.

The original director was Peter Medak, who left the project two days into filming, along with DOP Anthony B. Richmond. They were replaced by Lewis Teague and Jan de Bont respectively.

Cujo was played by four St. Bernards, several mechanical dogs, and a black Labrador–Great Dane mix in a St. Bernard costume. In some shots, stuntman Gary Morgan played Cujo while wearing a large dog costume. Karl Miller was the trainer for the dogs in Cujo. Frank Welker provided the vocal effects of Cujo.

== Release ==
Warner Bros. Pictures released Cujo theatrically in the United States on August 12, 1983.

=== Home media ===
Artisan Entertainment first released Cujo on DVD format in 2000. A 25th-anniversary DVD was subsequently released by Lionsgate in 2007. Olive Films issued a 30th-anniversary Blu-ray on January 22, 2013. Kino Lorber released a 40th-anniversary 4K UHD Blu-ray edition on October 24, 2023.

== Reception ==
=== Box office ===
Cujo was a modest box office success for Warner Bros. The film opened in second place at the U.S. box office. It grossed a total of $21,156,152 domestically, making it the fourth-highest-grossing horror film of 1983 behind Jaws 3-D, Psycho II, and Twilight Zone: The Movie.

=== Critical response ===
Reviews from critics were mixed. Janet Maslin of The New York Times wrote the film was "by no means a horror classic, but it's suspenseful and scary". Variety panned it as "a dull, uneventful entry in the horror genre, a film virtually devoid of surprises or any original suspense". Gene Siskel of the Chicago Tribune gave the film one star out of four, calling it "one of the dumbest, flimsiest excuses for a movie I have ever seen". Roger Ebert called it "dreadful", while Linda Gross of the Los Angeles Times wrote that "no theater is air conditioned enough to justify watching this scary, gory and beastly movie," though she did concede that Teague "directs the violent, scary scenes and some of the quiet domestic ones with efficiency."

Steve Jenkins of The Monthly Film Bulletin wrote that "for the most part Cujo works very effectively as a near reductio ad absurdum of the woman-in-peril-mode", but disliked that the film changed the ending from the book, thinking it made "absolutely no sense in terms of the film's logic". Author and film critic Leonard Maltin gave the film three out of a possible four stars, calling it "genuinely frightening", and also writing: "Builds slowly but surely to [its] terrifying (but not gory) climax". Stephen King called the film "terrific" and named it one of his favorite adaptations.

Film student Alice Foulkes wrote a retrospective review of Cujo for The National Student in 2018, in which she argued that the absence of fantasy elements and general plausibility of Cujo make it more terrifying than most horror films.

On review aggregation website Rotten Tomatoes, it holds a 60% approval rating based on 45 reviews, with the website's consensus stating: "Cujo is artless work punctuated with moments of high canine gore and one wild Dee Wallace performance". On Metacritic, the film holds a 57 out of 100 based on reviews from 8 critics, indicating "mixed or average" reviews.

== Remake ==
In March 2025, Netflix announced they were developing a remake of the film with Roy Lee serving as producer.
