= The Dead Zone (novel) =

1979 novel by Stephen King

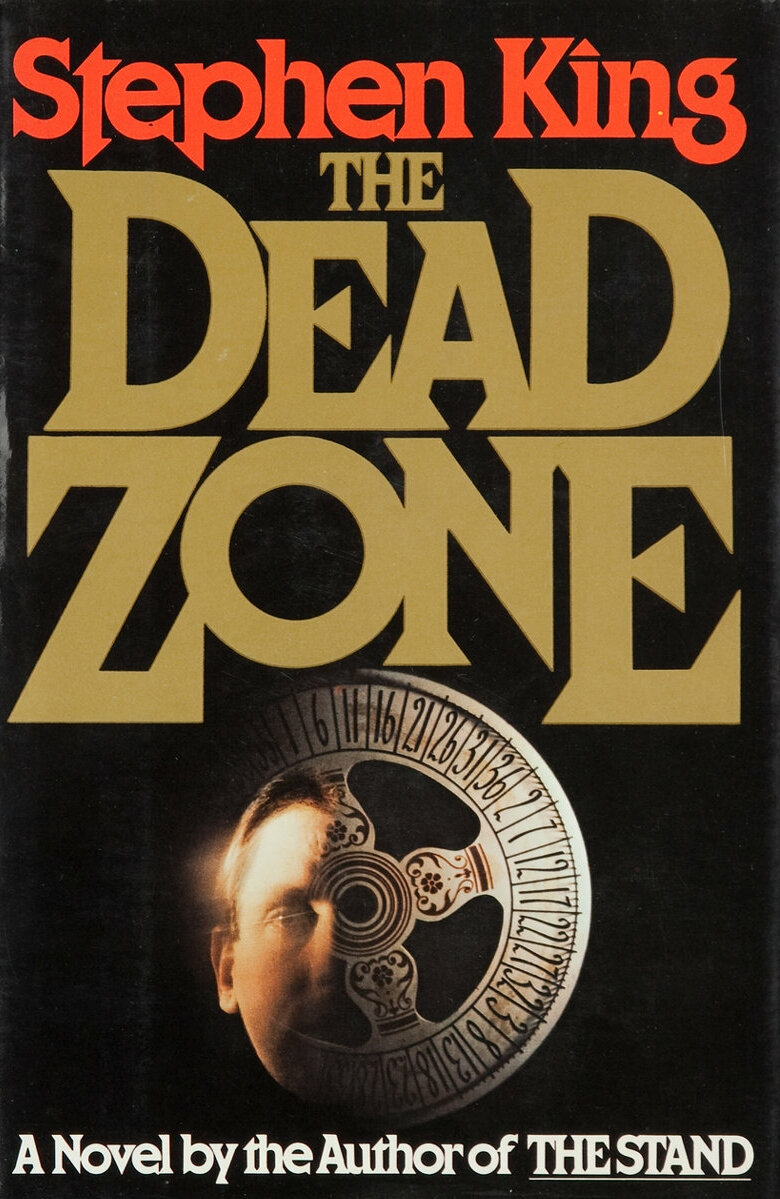
- First edition cover
- Author: Stephen King
- Language: English
- Genre: Science fiction, Thriller
- Publisher: Viking Press
- Publication date: August 16, 1979
- Publication place: United States
- Media type: Print (Hardcover and Paperback)
- Pages: 428
- ISBN: 978-0-670-26077-5

The Dead Zone is a science fiction thriller novel by Stephen King published in 1979. The story follows Johnny Smith, who awakens from a coma of nearly five years and, apparently as a result of brain damage, now experiences clairvoyant and precognitive visions triggered by touch. When some information is blocked from his perception, Johnny refers to that information as being trapped in the part of his brain that is permanently damaged, "the dead zone". The novel also follows a serial killer in Castle Rock, and the life of rising politician Greg Stillson, both of whom are evils Johnny must eventually face.

Though earlier King books were successful, The Dead Zone was the first of his novels to rank among the ten best-selling novels of the year in the United States. The book was nominated for the Locus Award in 1980 and was dedicated to King's son Owen. The Dead Zone is the first story by King to feature the fictional town of Castle Rock, which serves as the setting for several later stories and is referred to in others. The TV series Castle Rock takes place in this fictional town and makes references to the Strangler whom Johnny helped track down in The Dead Zone. The Dead Zone is King's seventh novel and the fifth under his own name. The book spawned a 1983 film adaptation as well as a television series.

== Plot ==
As a child in 1953, Johnny Smith falls unconscious after a collision while ice-skating, then mumbles a prophetic warning to an adult who later suffers an accident. In an unconnected incident, a young, emotionally troubled door-to-door Bible salesman named Greg Stillson vindictively kicks a dog to death.

By 1970, Johnny is a high school teacher in the small town of Cleaves Mills, Maine, with a new girlfriend named Sarah. After winning repeatedly at a carnival wheel of fortune, Johnny is involved in a car accident and falls into a coma. Waking up nearly five years later, Johnny finds that he has suffered a neural injury, with one part of his brain seriously damaged, making it a "dead zone". As if to compensate, other parts of the brain now show heightened activity. As a result, Johnny sometimes experiences clairvoyant visions when touching people and objects. His mother, who has become fanatically religious during the period of Johnny's coma, insists that he has been given a holy mission which he must not decline; she soon dies of a stroke.

While in hospital rehab, Johnny helps various people but is frustrated by sensational media coverage and the public's demands for assistance. When he rejects a lucrative offer to lend his name to fake predictions published in a tabloid, the tabloid editor denounces him as a fraud, but Johnny merely hopes that the public's disillusionment will let him resume a normal life.

Johnny plans to resume teaching at the high school despite severe recurring headaches. Sarah visits him at his father's house, and they have sex for the first and only time. She makes it clear that she has a new life with her husband Walt and their child, and leaves Johnny forever. Sheriff George Bannerman of Castle Rock asks Johnny to help catch a local serial killer. After a nine-year-old girl is murdered, Johnny investigates and reluctantly identifies the Castle Rock Strangler as Bannerman's deputy Frank Dodd, who commits suicide after leaving a confession. As Johnny feared, the incident reignites the public's interest in his power, and he is seen as too controversial to return to teaching.

Greg Stillson, now a successful businessman and mayor of Ridgeway, New Hampshire, enlists a biker gang and threatens to kill the people he bullies if they reveal his actions or do not aid him. In 1976, he wins a seat in the U.S. House of Representatives as an independent, having blackmailed a local businessman into raising funds for him. Johnny becomes a private tutor to a teenage boy in Ridgeway and develops an interest in politics. He meets Stillson and is horrified to see a vision of an older Stillson, now President, causing a worldwide nuclear conflict. As Johnny's health worsens, he contemplates Stillson's presidency, comparing his dilemma to someone with the ability to time travel having the opportunity to kill Hitler in 1932. Rather than assassinate Stillson to ensure the vision does not come true, Johnny procrastinates because of doubt in his vision, his abhorrence of murder, and his belief that there is no urgent need to act immediately since he has met an FBI agent investigating Stillson as a possible threat.

The FBI agent is killed by a car bomb. Meanwhile, Johnny's warnings that a disaster will occur at his pupil's graduation party are ignored by some, leading to several deaths. Now believing he must take more decisive action to prevent nuclear war, and learning his headaches are the result of a brain tumor, Johnny buys a rifle to kill Stillson. At the next rally, Stillson begins his speech, and Johnny shoots from a balcony. He misses and is wounded by guards. Stillson grabs a young child and uses him as a human shield. A bystander photographs Stillson's act. Unable to shoot a child, Johnny is shot twice by the bodyguards, and he falls from the balcony, mortally wounded. Dying, Johnny touches Stillson a final time. He feels only dwindling impressions and knows the terrible future has been prevented. When the picture of Stillson using a child as a shield is published, it ends his political career.

An epilogue intersperses excerpts of letters from Johnny to his loved ones, a "Q & A" transcript of a purported Senate committee (chaired by real-life Maine Senator William Cohen) investigation of Johnny's attempt to assassinate Stillson, and a narrative of Sarah's visit to Johnny's grave. Sarah feels a brief moment of psychic contact with Johnny's spirit and, comforted, drives away.

== Reception ==
Christopher Lehmann-Haupt of The New York Times compared reading the novel to the experience of watching "a particularly compelling movie", which he said is evidence of the novel's entertainment value, even if it does not speak of its literary value. The Washington Post's reviewer wrote, "It is not a book that will please everyone, but those who like it will probably like it a lot." In a retrospective review, James Smythe of The Guardian wrote that The Dead Zone had become one of his favorite King novels after rereading it. Smythe said that although the novel seems to have no clear antagonist throughout the first two-thirds, it reveals itself as "a more literary novel about rehabilitation and loss".

The Dead Zone was nominated for the Locus Award for Best Fantasy Novel, the World Fantasy Award for Best Novel, and the Balrog Award for Best Novel. Despite the above, the American Library Association found The Dead Zone to be the 82nd-most banned and challenged book in the United States between 1990 and 1999.

== Adaptations ==
=== Film ===
In 1983, the novel was adapted by screenwriter Jeffrey Boam into a film of the same name, starring Christopher Walken as Johnny and Martin Sheen as Greg Stillson. It was directed by David Cronenberg. In the movie adaptation, the phrase "dead zone" does not refer to the part of Johnny's brain that is damaged. Instead, it refers to the blind spots in Johnny's visions of the future. Since they do not appear in visions of the past or events that are occurring in the present, Johnny concludes the "dead zone" blindspots represent that the future is not set and can be altered.

=== Television ===
The television series The Dead Zone began broadcasting in late 2002, airing on the USA Network and starring Anthony Michael Hall as Johnny, Nicole de Boer as Sarah, and Sean Patrick Flanery as Greg Stillson. In the TV series, the phrase "dead zone" does not refer to the part of Johnny's brain that is damaged but instead to the previously "dormant" part of his brain that awakens and causes his psychic abilities. It is shown that others before and after Johnny who suffered similar injuries also have their "dead zones" awakened and experience the same psychic abilities.

Sarah's husband Walt and the character of Sheriff George Bannerman were combined for the TV show into a new character Walt Bannerman, who marries Sarah during Johnny's coma and is the local sheriff. Walt regularly works with Johnny, the two combining police resources and psychic visions to solve many cases. While in the book, Sarah and Johnny only share a kiss before his coma, the TV series depicts them as childhood friends who then become long time lovers and conceive a child before Johnny's accident. When Johnny awakens from his coma, he learns he and Sarah have a son, Johnny or "JJ", who is being raised by her and Walt. Among the supporting cast, Johnny's physical therapist Bruce becomes his best friend and most trusted aid during his adventures and his eventual investigation of Stillson. A season 2 episode reveals that if Johnny and Bruce had never met, then Johnny would have become an isolated loner who dies while attempting to assassinate Stillson at a rally, just as occurred in the book.
