= The Body (King novella) =

1982 coming-of-age story novella by Stephen King

- 2009 audiobook edition cover
- Author: Stephen King
- Language: English
- Genre: Coming-of-age story
- Publisher: Viking
- Publication date: 1982
- Publication place: United States
- Media type: Print (Hardcover)

The Body is a novella by American writer Stephen King. The Body was published in King's 1982 collection Different Seasons and later adapted into the 1986 film Stand by Me.

The story takes place during the summer of 1960 in the fictional town of Castle Rock, Maine. After a boy disappears and is presumed dead, twelve-year-old Gordie LaChance and his three friends set out to find his body along the railway tracks. During the course of their journey, the boys, who all come from abusive or dysfunctional families, come to grips with death and the harsh truths of growing up in a small factory town that does not seem to offer them much of a future.

== Plot summary ==
Gordon "Gordie" Lachance reminisces about his childhood in Castle Rock, Maine. At that time, Gordie's elder brother Dennis (also known as Denny), whom his parents favored, had recently died, leaving Gordie's parents too depressed to pay much attention to him. In 1960, Gordie and his three friends − Chris Chambers, Teddy Duchamp and Vern Tessio − learn that a gang of hooligans led by Ace Merrill has accidentally discovered the dead body of a missing boy named Ray Brower, who was hit by a train. Because the gang found the body while driving a stolen car, they elected not to report the body to the police. The boys decide to find the body "officially" so they can become famous. In preparation for the expedition, Chris steals a gun from his father, and the boys camp out in a nearby field.

Over the course of the narrative, the adult Gordie recalls his first published story, Stud City, about the life of a simple man named Edward "Chico" May whose older brother also died. He has a girlfriend, Jane, for whom he does not have particularly strong feelings. Chico knows that his stepmother Virginia slept with his brother before he died, but he hesitates to tell his father about it. One day, Chico fights with his father over Virginia and leaves the house.

Along the way, the boys trespass at the town dump and are chased by Chopper, the dog belonging to the dump custodian, Milo Pressman. Teddy gets into a verbal skirmish with Milo when the latter insults Teddy's father (a World War II veteran who was given a Section 8 discharge for trauma related to the Normandy invasion) by calling him a "loonie". Gordie and Vern are nearly run over by a train while crossing a trestle. While at a resting point, Gordie tells his friends another story, "The Revenge of Lard-Ass Hogan", in which the titular Davie "Lard-Ass" Hogan exacts vengeance on the town locals for ridiculing his wide girth by downing a whole bottle of castor oil before engaging in the town's annual pie-eating contest and vomiting on the previous year's champion, which causes a chain reaction that nauseates the entire audience. The next morning, the boys stumble upon a small pond and take a swim, but jump out in horror when they find it teeming with leeches.

After a thunderstorm, the boys finally find Ray Brower's body. Ace's gang arrives shortly after to try to officially recover the body as well. During an argument, Chris pulls the gun on the gang and forces them to leave, but Ace promises reprisals. Tired, depressed, and fearing retaliation, the boys decide there is nothing more to be done with the body and return home. Subsequently, Ace reports the body as an anonymous tip, and the gang members severely beat all four boys. The four friends eventually drift apart, but Gordie and Chris remain close. Chris decides to prepare for higher education, and he and Gordie both graduate from the University of Maine.

In the present day, Gordie tells how he learned of Chris's death after he was fatally stabbed while trying to stop an argument in a restaurant, about the deaths of Vern and Teddy (in a house fire and car crash, respectively), about his own successful writing career, and about his recent visit to Castle Rock, where he has discovered that Ace has become an alcoholic and works at the town's mill.

== Publication ==
The Body was published in King's 1982 novellas collection Different Seasons. It incorporates two earlier short stories by King: "Stud City" (published in Ubris in 1969) and "The Revenge of Lard-Ass Hogan" (published in The Maine Review in 1975). In the afterwords of Different Season, King says that The Body is the oldest story in the collection, which King began writing after finishing 'Salem's Lot.

=== Accusation of plagiarism ===
A former friend and college roommate of King's, George MacLeod, claimed that King had cribbed the idea for The Body from a short story MacLeod had been working on, but these claims are disputed by King. MacLeod’s story was written from an experience he had as a child. His father had told him about a dead dog he had spotted on railroad tracks, prompting MacLeod and his friends to go looking for “the body” one day after school. Since MacLeod’s accusations, King has refused his fans' requests to read their manuscripts for advice; King has explained that he is concerned that there may be further accusations of plagiarism.

== Adaptation ==
The Body was adapted into the 1986 film Stand by Me directed by Rob Reiner. The screenplay, by Bruce A. Evans and Raynold Gideon, was nominated for the Academy Award for Best Adapted Screenplay and the Writers Guild of America Award in the same category.

== See also ==
- Stephen King short fiction bibliography
