= The Dark Half =

1989 novel by Stephen King

- First edition cover
- Author: Stephen King
- Language: English
- Genre: Psychological horror
- Publisher: Viking
- Publication date: October 20, 1989
- Publication place: United States
- Media type: Print (Hardcover)
- Pages: 431
- ISBN: 978-0-670-82982-8

The Dark Half is a horror novel by American writer Stephen King, published in 1989. Publishers Weekly listed The Dark Half as the second-best-selling book of 1989 behind Tom Clancy's Clear and Present Danger. The novel was adapted into a feature film of the same name in 1993.

Stephen King wrote several books under a pseudonym, Richard Bachman, during the 1970s and 1980s. Most of the Bachman novels were darker and more cynical in nature, featuring a far more visceral sense of horror than the psychological, gothic style common in many of King's most famous works. When King was identified as Bachman, he wrote The Dark Half – about an author – in response to his outing. At an early point, the book may have been intended to be published as "co-authored" by King and Bachman.

The book's central villain, George Stark, was named in honor of Richard Stark, the pen name of writer Donald E. Westlake under which he wrote some of his darkest, most violent books. King telephoned Westlake personally to ask permission. King's own "Richard Bachman" pseudonym was also partly named for Stark: King had been reading a Richard Stark novel at the time he chose the pen name.

== Plot summary ==
Thad Beaumont is a novelist and recovering alcoholic who lives in the town of Ludlow, Maine. Thad's own books – cerebral literary fiction – are not very successful. Under the pen name "George Stark," he writes highly successful crime novels about a psychopathic killer named Alexis Machine. When Thad's authorship of Stark's novels becomes public knowledge, Thad and his wife, Elizabeth, decide to stage a mock burial for his alter ego at the local cemetery, which is featured in a People magazine article. His epitaph reads: "Not a Very Nice Guy."

Stark emerges from the mock grave as a physical entity, complete with the personality traits that Thad exhibited while writing as him, such as alcohol abuse and Pall Mall cigarette smoking. He then goes on a killing spree, gruesomely murdering everyone he perceives as responsible for his "death" – Thad's editor, agent and the People interviewer, among others. A cryptic message has also been found at some of the murder sites: "The Sparrows Are Flying Again." Thad, meanwhile, is plagued by surreal nightmares. Stark's murders are investigated by Alan Pangborn, the sheriff of the neighboring town of Castle Rock, who finds Thad's fingerprints at the crime scenes. This evidence, and Thad's unwillingness to answer his questions, causes Pangborn to believe that Thad, despite having alibis, is responsible for the murders. Later, it is discovered that Stark has the same fingerprints as Thad, a clue to the twinship he and Thad share.

Thad eventually discovers that he and Stark share a mental bond, and begins to find notes from Stark written in his own handwriting. The notes tell Thad what activity Stark has been engaging in. Observing his son and daughter, Thad notes that twins share a unique bond, feeling each other's pain and at times appear to read each other's mind. Using this as a key to his own situation, he begins to discover the even deeper connection behind himself and Stark. He also realizes that the sounds of a flock of sparrows inside Thad's head that he hears during headaches take on a new meaning in the form of "psychopomps."

Pangborn eventually learns that Thad had an unborn twin brother who was absorbed into Thad in utero and later removed from his brain when he was a child. He had suffered from severe headaches and it was originally thought to be a tumor causing them. The neurosurgeon who removed it found the following inside: part of a nostril, some fingernails, some teeth and a malformed human eye. This leads to questions about the true nature of Stark, whether he is a malevolent spirit with its own existence, or Thad himself, manifesting an alternate personality. Thad eventually destroys Stark in a showdown where he uses a bird call to bring forth a flock of sparrows that tear Stark's body apart, but the book ends on an unhappy note. It is suggested by Pangborn that Thad's wife may be having serious doubts about the future of their relationship: she is appalled that Thad not only created Stark (if unintentionally), but that a part of him liked Stark.

== Adaptations ==
The novel was adapted as a film, The Dark Half, by George A. Romero in 1990, and was released in 1993. It was filmed in part at Washington and Jefferson College and other locations in southwestern Pennsylvania. It stars Timothy Hutton as Thad/Stark, Amy Madigan as Elizabeth, Michael Rooker as Alan Pangborn, and Julie Harris as an eccentric colleague of Thad's who provides some vital information about the supernatural.

A video game adaptation was released for MS-DOS in 1992. It was developed by Symtus and published by Capstone Software.

In December 2019, it was announced that MGM would develop a film adaptation of the novel, with Alex Ross Perry set to write and direct.
