= On Writing: A Memoir of the Craft =

2000 memoir by Stephen King

On Writing
- First edition cover
- Author: Stephen King
- Cover artist: Lisa Litwak
- Subjects: Autobiography, writing
- Published: 2000 (Scribner; original); 2010 (10th anniversary edition); 2020 (20th anniversary edition)
- Publication place: United States
- Pages: 288 (2000)
- ISBN: 978-0684853529
- Preceded by: Nightmares in the Sky
- Followed by: Secret Windows: Essays and Fiction on the Craft of Writing

On Writing: A Memoir of the Craft is a memoir by American author Stephen King that describes his experiences as a writer and his advice for aspiring writers. Originally published in 2000 by Charles Scribner's Sons, it was King's first book after he was involved in a car accident a year earlier. Scribner has published two expanded editions: the 10th Anniversary Edition (2010) has an updated reading list from King; and the 20th Anniversary Edition (2020) adds contributions from King's two sons, Joe Hill and Owen.

The book is organized into five sections: "C.V.", where King highlights events in his life that influenced his writing; "What Writing Is", where King urges the reader to take writing seriously; "Toolbox", discussing English mechanics; "On Writing", where King details his advice to aspiring writers; and "On Living: A Postscript", where he describes his roadside accident and how it affected his life.

In 2008, Entertainment Weekly included On Writing on their "The New Classics: Books – The 100 best reads from 1983 to 2008" list. In their reviews, Sharon Johnson of The Patriot-News and Julie Woo of Associated Press praised King's advice as "solid". John Mark Eberhart of the Sunday Free Lance-Star called King's writing advice "pedestrian", but ultimately concluded that On Writing was "a slight but transitionally important work that should lead [King] to better things."

== Background ==
Stephen King began composing On Writing in 1997. After completing the "C.V." and "Toolbox" sections, he set aside the manuscript in February or March 1998, explaining in the final section of On Writing that he was uncertain how or whether he should proceed with it. In June 1999, he reread the uncompleted draft and became determined to finish it.

On June 19, 1999, King was hit by a van while walking along Maine State Route 5. He subsequently struggled to return to writing, uncertain whether he could publish another novel. In an interview with NBC, he said: "After the accident, I was totally incapable of writing. At first it was as if I'd never done this in my life. ... It was like starting over again from square one."

In January 2000, King wrote on his website that he had finished On Writing and was more optimistic about his career, stating, "My endurance is much less than it was and my output has been cut in half, but I am working." In the final section of On Writing, "On Living: A Postscript", King reflects on the accident and his return to writing, stating "Things have continued to get better." It was the first book he published following his accident.

== Summary ==
On Writing is divided into five sections, each with a different focus. Although the first section, "C.V." narrates his life, King said that it is not an autobiography, but more a curriculum vitae, owing to the sporadic nature of his memories. It discusses events in King's life that contributed to his development as a writer, such as his early exposure to writing, his early attempts to be published, his relationship with his wife,his mother's death, and his history of drug and alcohol abuse.

In the second section, "What Writing Is", King compares writing to telepathy. He briefly reintroduces himself and includes an example of literary description. He urges the reader to take writing and his advice seriously.

The third section, "Toolbox", discusses English mechanics and the importance of vocabulary, grammar and style in writing.

The fourth section, "On Writing", details King's advice on the art of writing.

The fifth section, "On Living: A Postscript", discusses the accident in 1999 where King was struck by a van while walking down Maine State Route 5. The book's United Kingdom paperback edition concludes with "Jumper", a short story by Garret Adams that won the On Writing competition.

== Reception ==
In 2008, Entertainment Weekly listed On Writing 21st on their list of "The New Classics: Books – The 100 best reads from 1983 to 2008".

Sharon Johnson, in a review published by The Patriot-News, wrote that King survived his car accident "with his skill intact", calling King's advice "solid" and "an unexpected gift to writers and readers." Peter Sobczynski, a correspondent for the Post-Tribune, called the book "a fun, incisive read", specifically highlighting its emotional power: "In writing candidly and honestly about his recovery from a trauma that should have killed him, King has never been more affecting. Obviously, it is a good thing he was able to survive and get back into shape on a physical and emotional level."

Julie Woo for the Associated Press also called King's advice "solid", specifically about dialogue and plot. However, Woo also observed that "many other books about writing offer such advice and some are more inspirational and ambitious," noting how "King cannot replicate a formula for his success so he does the next best thing by describing his work habits and environment urging that consistency in those areas can be conducive to good writing." John Mark Eberhart wrote a mixed review in the Sunday Free Lance-Star. Criticizing King's recommendations on writing, Eberhart remarked that they were "so pedestrian that I can't remember when I first ran across any of them." On the other hand, Eberhart praised On Writing's discussion of King's personal life, stating that "King's writing about his own alcoholism and cocaine abuse is among the best and most honest prose of his career." Eberhart ultimately characterized the book as "a slight but transitionally important work that should lead [King] to better things."

On Writing won the Locus Award for Best Non-fiction in 2001.

== Audiobook ==
- 2000: On Writing: A Memoir of the Craft (read by Stephen King), Simon & Schuster Audioworks, ISBN 978-0743506656
