= The Reaper's Image =

- Short story by Stephen King
- Country: United States
- Language: English
- Genre: Horror short story

Publication
- Published in: Startling Mystery Stories
- Publication type: Magazine
- Media type: Print (Periodical & Paperback)
- Publication date: Spring 1969

"The Reaper's Image" is a horror short story by American writer Stephen King, first published in Startling Mystery Stories in 1969 and collected in Skeleton Crew in 1985. The story is about an antique mirror haunted by the visage of the Grim Reaper, who appears to those who gaze into it.

== Plot summary ==
The story follows an irascible antique collector, Johnson Spangler, as he visits the Samuel Claggert Museum and tries to authenticate the legendary "Delver's Mirror". Museum curator Mr. Carlin ushers Spangler through the building and recounts the history of the rare Elizabethan mirror and the numerous attempts to destroy it. The curator also explains the mirror's infamous history, recounting all the people who looked into it and mysteriously disappeared.

Carlin tells a skeptical Spangler that an image of the Grim Reaper is rumored to appear in the mirror, standing close to the viewer. Spangler scoffs, but feels unnatural horror when he looks into the mirror and claims to see some friction tape in the mirror's corner. He angrily confronts Carlin, who claims the mirror is undamaged. However, Carlin claims that there is no tape, and Spangler is "seeing the reaper." When Spangler runs his hand over the "friction tape", he feels a smooth surface rather than the rough outside of the tape. When Spangler looks again, the friction tape is gone. As Carlin relates the story of a high school boy who saw the Reaper and disappeared without a trace, Spangler becomes ill and rushes out of the second floor, while Mr. Carlin stays behind to wait.

== Publication ==
King wrote "The Reaper's Image" at age 18 in summer 1966, shortly before beginning college. It was first published in issue 12 of Startling Mystery Stories in spring 1969. He was paid $35 (equivalent to $307 in 2025) for the story, which was his second to be published commercially (the first being "The Glass Floor", published in autumn 1967). In 1985, a revised version was collected in King's second book of short stories, Skeleton Crew.

== Reception ==
Literary critic Michael R. Collings writes that although it draws on Edgar Allan Poe and H. P. Lovecraft, "The Reaper's Image" was "a stronger, more independent piece of atmospheric horror than King had yet produced", making use of flashbacks, self-consistent characterizations, and "allow[ing] the mystery of the Delver mirror to develop its own power rather than imposing a mystery upon the characters, as he had done in 'The Glass Floor'." Similarly, Darrell Schweitzer comments "The story is quite similar to 'The Glass Floor', but is told more skillfully". Tyson Blue describes the story as "a traditional Stephen King tale [...] one of his nods to his literary forebears", suggesting the story was influenced by the works of Edgar Allan Poe.

== Adaptations ==
A short film adaptation of The Reaper's Image was released in 2013.

== See also ==
- Stephen King short fiction bibliography
