= Secret Windows =

Book by Stephen King

- Author: Stephen King
- Language: English
- Subject: Writing
- Publisher: Book of the Month Club
- Publication date: October 2000
- Publication place: United States
- Media type: Print (Hardcover)
- Pages: 433
- ISBN: 0-16-500643-9
- Preceded by: On Writing: A Memoir of the Craft
- Followed by: Faithful (book)

Secret Windows: Essays and Fiction on the Craft of Writing is a collection of short stories, essays, speeches, and book excerpts by Stephen King, published in 2000. It was marketed by Book of the Month Club as a companion to King's On Writing. Although its title is derived from a King novella (Secret Window, Secret Garden), it is not otherwise related to that novella or the film adaptation, Secret Window.

The texts in the collection are primarily concerned with writing and the horror genre. Several of the entries have been published elsewhere, including introductions King had written for other authors' novels, as well as introductions and essays from King's previous books. This volume also includes several short works that had not been previously published elsewhere, including lectures given by King, an interview with King conducted by Muriel Gray, a never-before-published short story by King, titled "In the Deathroom," and an introduction written by Peter Straub.

== Contents ==
Title	Originally published in	Original publication date	Notes
Introduction by Peter Straub	Previously unreleased	Previously unreleased	Introduction
"Jumper"	Dave's Rag	1959–1960	Short story
"Rush Call"	Dave's Rag	1960	Short story
The Horror Market Writer and the Ten Bears: A True Story	Writer's Digest	1973	Essay
Foreword to Night Shift	Night Shift	1978	Foreword
On Becoming a Brand Name	Adelina	1980	
Horror Fiction	Danse Macabre	1981	Chapter
An Evening at the Billerica (Massachusetts) Library		1983	Speech transcript
The Ballad of the Flexible Bullet	The Magazine of Fantasy & Science Fiction	1984	Novella
How It happened	Book of the Month Club news	1986	
Banned Books and Other Concerns: The Virginia Beach lecture	Virginia Beach Public Library	1986	
Turning the Thumbscrew on the Reader	Book of the Month Club news	1987	
"Ever Et Raw Meat?" and Other Weird Questions	The New York Times book review	1987	Essay
A new introduction to John Fowles' The Collector	The Collector	1989	Introduction
What Stephen King does for Love	Seventeen	1990	Essay
Two Past Midnight: A note on Secret Window, Secret Garden	Four Past Midnight	1990	
Introduction to Jack Ketchum's The Girl Next Door	The Girl Next Door	1995	Introduction
Great Hookers I Have Known			Essay
A Night at the Royal Festival Hall: Muriel Gray interviews Stephen King		1998	Interview
An Evening with Stephen King		1999	
"In the Deathroom"	Blood and Smoke	1999	Short story
