= List of The Stand characters =

The following is a partial list of characters from Stephen King's novel The Stand. The novel was published in 1978, with its narrative set during the 1980s; however, a second edition was released in 1990, is considerably longer than the first version (1,200 pages compared to 800 pages), and is set in the 1990s. The two versions are essentially the same, although some content was added in the second version, including a new ending. The book was also adapted into a television mini-series, starring Gary Sinise, Molly Ringwald, and Rob Lowe and was released by the American Broadcasting Company (ABC) network in 1994. In 2008, Marvel Comics published a comic book adaptation that was ended in 2012. Warner Bros. Pictures released an announcement in January 2011 that the company would be producing a movie remake of the King novel. The project never came to fruition and the book was eventually adapted as a second miniseries for the streaming service CBS All Access where it is currently streaming.

== Project Blue ==
=== Specialist Charles D. Campion ===
Charles Campion is an American soldier stationed at a military base in the California desert. While Campion is on guard duty one night, a deadly superflu virus escapes containment; a system intended to lock down the base fails to activate immediately, giving Campion time to flee by car with his wife and daughter. He finally succumbs to the superflu at a gas station in the fictional town of Arnette, East Texas, spreading the virus and making him its patient zero.

In the 1994 miniseries, Campion is portrayed by Ray McKinnon. In the 2020 miniseries, he is portrayed by Curtiss Cook Jr.

=== General William "Billy" Starkey ===
The ruthless, intellectual, West Point-educated U.S. Army general in charge of the highly classified Project Blue, "Billy" Starkey provides much of the early exposition in The Stand through his POV and conversations with his friend and aide-de-camp, Major Len Creighton. Starkey realizes mankind is doomed from the moment the superflu escapes the labs where it was created, but makes every effort to contain its spread regardless.

Though personally compassionate, Starkey goes to extreme lengths to cover up the accidental outbreak and subsequent pandemic for as long as possible. Starkey directs a draconian campaign of blockades, murdering civilians and journalists, and violating civil rights, all of which leads to rising chaos in the U.S. as the public becomes convinced the federal government is lying to them about what is happening. In an attempt to maintain plausible deniability, Starkey activates a contingency plan to have spies release the virus in the Eastern Bloc and China, effectively guaranteeing the near-extinction of all mankind. After being dismissed by the President of the United States due to his failure to contain the virus, Starkey commits suicide in the laboratory where the superflu was created.

In the 1994 miniseries, Starkey is portrayed by Ed Harris, and is shown to hold the rank of lieutenant general. In the 2020 miniseries, he is portrayed by J. K. Simmons.

=== Major Len Creighton^{†} ===
A dedicated and loyal career U.S. Army officer, Len Creighton is General Starkey's friend and right-hand man; he periodically updates Starkey as he works behind the scenes to suppress both the "Captain Trips" superflu and the truth of its origins. As things fall apart, Starkey is fired by the President and subsequently takes his own life, leaving Creighton in charge of U.S. Army containment efforts as both the Army and civilization collapse. Creighton is last heard speaking to another U.S. Army officer via radio in Los Angeles, but it is unknown whether he survives the superflu or the chaos that follows.

^{†} This character is named Len Carsleigh in pre-1990 editions of the novel and in the 1994 miniseries.

In the 1994 miniseries, Carsleigh is played by Robert Knott. The character does not appear in the 2020 miniseries.

== Boulder ==
=== Mother Abagail ===
Abagail Freemantle, also known as Mother Abagail, leads the good survivors of the Captain Trips plague and claims to be a prophet of God. She is 108 years old and lives in a farmhouse near Hemingford Home, Nebraska.

Born in 1882 to freed slaves from South Carolina, Abagail outlived three husbands and all her seven children. She is one of the 0.6% of the population that is immune to the superflu and initially appears to some of the plague survivors in their dreams, drawing them to her farmhouse, just as Randall Flagg (also known as the "Dark Man" and the "Walking Man") draws the evil survivors to his settlement in Las Vegas. She and her followers make their way towards Boulder, Colorado where they establish the "Boulder Free Zone" government.

Abagail receives prophetic visions from God, which end when she believes she has sinned due to pride and goes into exile in the wilderness. She later regains her ability and returns to the Boulder Free Zone. The timing of her arrival saves most of the Free Zone Committee from Harold Lauder's assassination attempt. On her deathbed, she shares one final vision: four men from the committee will travel to the West coast to confront Flagg. She makes no prediction as to what will occur, only that one will fall before arriving in Las Vegas, while the remainder will be brought before Flagg. Mother Abagail dies shortly after revealing this prophecy.

In the 1994 miniseries, Mother Abagail was portrayed by Ruby Dee, and is described as being 106 years old. In the 2020 miniseries, she was portrayed by Whoopi Goldberg, who had previously turned the role down in 1994. The 2020 miniseries also features a young girl portrayed by Kendall Joy Hall who is implied to be the spirit of Mother Abagail.

Salon and Gizmodo criticized Mother Abagail for being an example of the Magical Negro stereotype, a black character with magic powers whose sole purpose is to help the white protagonists.

=== Stuart "Stu" Redman ===
Stu Redman is a quiet, intelligent widower and veteran from Arnette, Texas, with a tragic history; he has lost most of his family, leaving only his brother Bryce (who lived in Minnesota working as a system analyst for IBM) as a sole surviving family member, prior to the apocalyptic pandemic. He is at his friend's gas station the night Charles Campion arrives. Redman is the first to show positive signs of immunity to the superflu and is taken by government authorities, first to the Atlanta Centers for Disease Control and Prevention (CDC), then to the fictitious Stovington, Vermont disease center. They inject him with a pure strain of the virus occasionally and his immune system keeps killing it, but they have failed to create a cure from him. Redman escapes from the Stovington facility after a government employee attempts to execute him (Redman himself guesses that it was decided he "knows too much") and he kills his attacker in self-defense.

After wandering New England for several days, Redman meets and befriends Glen Bateman and, shortly after, Frances Goldsmith and Harold Lauder. Redman becomes romantically involved with Goldsmith despite their large age gap, and enters a marital relationship with her including accepting her unborn child; their involvement causes resentment with Lauder, who holds an unrequited love for Goldsmith. Redman rises to authority in the Boulder Free Zone, becoming the spokesperson for the Free Zone Committee and acting as the Zone's first marshal. Following an assassination attempt by Lauder, Mother Abagail tells Redman that he must travel west to confront Randall Flagg in Las Vegas.

Redman, together with Larry Underwood, Bateman, and Ralph Brentner, travels towards Las Vegas, but breaks his leg in Utah and is forced to stay behind, along with Kojak the dog. Redman develops pneumonia, due to injury and hypothermia, but witnesses the destruction of Las Vegas. He is saved by Tom Cullen, who nurses him back to health. Redman and Cullen return to Boulder first by snowmobile and finally by foot, where Goldsmith has given birth to the first post-plague child who has survived the Superflu, a son named Peter. The following summer, Redman and Goldsmith, who are now expecting a child together, depart from Boulder with Peter and begin traveling toward Goldsmith's hometown of Ogunquit, Maine.

In the 1994 miniseries, Stu was portrayed by Gary Sinise. In the 2020 miniseries, he was portrayed by James Marsden.

=== Frances "Frannie" Goldsmith ===
A college student from Ogunquit, Maine, Frances Goldsmith (often called Frannie) is pregnant at the start of the book, a topic which resulted in a painful standoff with her mother Carla and the end of her relationship with the baby's birth father, Jesse Rider. Her older brother, Frederick, had died after being accidentally killed by a motorcyclist whose brakes were failing when Frances was young, and she was close to her elderly father, Peter. The superflu wipes out Goldsmith's community, with her and Harold Lauder being the only local survivors after a parking lot attendant, Gus Dinsmore, contracts the virus and dies on June 30. It is also believed that Jesse is dead. After burying her father in his garden, Frances decides to join Lauder and they leave the vacant town.

At Lauder's suggestion, the two make their way to the Stovington facility of the CDC, encountering Stu Redman along the way. While Frances agrees to let Redman travel with them, Lauder is highly resistant, mainly due to his own feelings for Frances. Along with Glen Bateman, the group arrives at Stovington to confirm not only the deaths of everyone at the facility, but also that Redman was nearly killed in his escape from there.

The group then continues west towards Mother Abagail, during which time Frances falls deeply in love with Redman. The fact that he is significantly older is noted in her diary, along with many other aspects of the trip, and thus she is like her mother, who was significantly younger when she married her father. Lauder confesses his love to Frances, and she politely but firmly rejects him, before she and Redman reciprocate their feelings for each other. They eventually enter a marital relationship upon settling in Boulder.

Frances serves on the original Free Zone Committee and acts as its moral compass. Although Lauder claims to have dealt with his jealousy toward Redman, Frances remains suspicious, which is later justified when she finds details of a plot to kill Redman in Lauder's diary. Frances saves the majority of the Committee when she intuitively senses the presence of a bomb Lauder has planted but is unable to prevent its detonation. Frances is moderately injured in the blast, but her unborn child remains safe. Frances is opposed to Redman traveling to Las Vegas, but comes to terms with the journey when she realizes Redman cannot be swayed.

Frances later takes up residence with Lucy Swann and delivers a baby boy, named Peter after her father. After the initial joy wears off, he falls ill with the superflu and she is devastated. However, she is rewarded by news of both Redman's return to the Free Zone and Peter's recovery, proving that babies born to immune parents can develop resistance to the virus. Throughout the novel, Frances becomes more and more homesick for her native Maine, and she and Redman – now expecting a child together – eventually decide to take Peter and depart for Ogunquit. When Redman asks Frances, "Do you think people ever learn anything?", she reluctantly replies, "I don't know."

In the 1994 miniseries, Frannie was portrayed by Molly Ringwald. In the 2020 miniseries, she was portrayed by Odessa Young.

=== Nick Andros ===
A 22-year-old deaf-mute drifter, originally from Caslin, Nebraska, Nick Andros is beaten and robbed outside of (fictional) Shoyo, Arkansas by some local thugs, shortly after the start of the epidemic. Mildly injured in the assault and initially jailed, Andros is befriended by the local sheriff and his wife. Andros expresses a desire to press charges against his attackers, and the sheriff tracks down and arrests three of the four before falling ill with the superflu. Andros becomes the newest deputy, due to the absence of any other healthy people, and watches two of the thugs die of the plague, along with the sheriff. Andros decides to let the third prisoner go, and tends to the sheriff's wife before she also dies.

In the original 1978 publication of the novel, Andros falls from a bicycle and hits his head in the abandoned Shoyo, but scratches on his leg from the fall become infected and leave him sick for days. In the 1990 revised–expanded edition the injuries occur under different circumstances: Ray Booth, Andros' fourth attacker who escaped arrest but is slowly succumbing to the plague, attacks Andros a second time and nearly blinds him in one eye; panicking, Andros accidentally fires his service weapon before unholstering it and the bullet grazes his leg, causing the limb to become infected. Although Andros kills the weakened Booth, the injuries force him to wear an eye patch for most of the story.

Andros eventually recovers from the infection to his leg and begins his journey to Hemingford Home, Nebraska. Along the way he meets Tom Cullen, and later, Ralph Brentner, June Brinkmeyer, Gina McCone, Dick Ellis, and Olivia Walker; the group becomes a surrogate family to him. Andros leads the growing band of survivors to both Nebraska and Mother Abagail, who guides them on to Boulder. Andros serves on the Free Zone Committee, for which he is the leading thinker, and eventually recruits Cullen as a member of the spy contingent that travels to the West coast.

He does not like or trust Harold Lauder and unilaterally nixes his initial placement on the FZC. Andros is killed by Lauder's bomb and it is later revealed that he was meant to lead the stand against Flagg. Andros later reappears as a spirit to Cullen and, finally able to speak, guides Cullen as he attempts to return from Vegas and shows him how to save the life of a very ill Redman.

In the 1994 miniseries, Andros was portrayed by Rob Lowe, and is from Ridley, Pennsylvania. In the 2020 miniseries, he was portrayed by Henry Zaga.

=== Tom Cullen ===
Tom Cullen is initially thought to be in his mid-twenties to mid-thirties, with a mild to moderate learning disability. Nick Andros encounters him while cycling through Oklahoma. Upon learning that Cullen remembers his father's return from the Korean War, Andros realizes he must be much older, perhaps in his forties. The two form a close bond, despite the fact that Andros cannot speak and Cullen cannot read Andros' notes. When the two encounter Ralph Brentner, Cullen is finally able to learn Andros' name.

Cullen's speech includes colloquialisms such as "My laws!" and "Laws, yes!" He frequently references himself in third person. Cullen also punctuates important points, believing them to be spelled "M-O-O-N" such as exclaiming, "M-O-O-N, that spells Nebraska!" When he is required to make a logical connection, Cullen can slip into a form of self-hypnosis, wherein he is able to make connections that he cannot while "awake" — that is, conscious and focused on something superficial.

Andros, Stu Redman, and Glen Bateman use this ability to place a post-hypnotic suggestion in Cullen that will help him act as the third Free Zone spy. During one session the group discovers that while hypnotized, Cullen possesses the same type of foresight as Mother Abagail, concurrently referring to himself as the "Tom" Andros met in Oklahoma and "God's Tom".

Cullen travels west, transmitting a hypnotically-imprinted cover story to gain entrance into Las Vegas, and is able to avoid detection by Randall Flagg. Cullen's anonymity seems to stem from his disability, as Flagg tells Dayna Jurgens that every time he tries to see the third spy, all he sees is the moon; this confirms her sighting of Cullen earlier (while both were on Las Vegas work crews). It is Jurgens's desire to protect both Cullen and his status as a spy that compels her to commit suicide, rather than submit to further questioning from Flagg. The sight of the full moon rising over Las Vegas triggers Cullen to act on a post-hypnotic suggestion planted in his mind and begin the return trip to Boulder, avoiding the nuclear explosion that destroys the city.

During his journey, Cullen has a prophetic dream that compels him to double back and find Redman, who has broken his leg and has contracted pneumonia. With help from Andros's spirit, who appears to Cullen in visions, Cullen is able to nurse a delirious and dying Redman to convalescence in a central Utah (Green River) hotel. Several weeks later, the improving Redman takes Cullen to western Colorado (Grand Junction), where they get snowed in for almost a month. Finally, they return to Boulder and verify an earlier report that Las Vegas was destroyed.

In the 1994 miniseries, Cullen was portrayed by Bill Fagerbakke. In the 2020 miniseries, he was portrayed by Brad William Henke.

=== Larry Underwood ===
Lawson "Larry" Underwood is a young, narcissistic singer-songwriter who, at the beginning of the novel, is starting to achieve significant success with his debut single, "Baby, Can You Dig Your Man?" He tallies a debt with a drug dealer while living in Los Angeles and travels to New York City to hide, on the pretext of visiting his loving, but deeply disapproving, mother. When pressed, his mother points out his greatest character flaw to him directly: "You're a taker...you came home to me because you knew that I have to give." As the plague and anarchy destroy New York, Underwood attempts to care for his dying mother, but she eventually succumbs to the superflu.

Shortly after, Underwood finds he is one of the few living people remaining in New York City. He meets a troubled middle-aged woman named Rita Blakemoor and the two decide to leave New York together. They experience a frightening trek through the Lincoln Tunnel, an incident that Underwood is often haunted by for much of the story. Blakemoor eventually dies from a drug overdose that Underwood describes as "70% accident and 30% suicide." He feels guilty over his relief that he does not have to deal with her anymore, a confirmation of his mother's assessment of him.

Haunted by his dreams of Randall Flagg and Blakemoor, Underwood falls into a semi-catatonic state of self-reflection for several days until he finally collapses from exhaustion in New Hampshire. This event is the beginning of a turning point in Larry's life.

Recovering after a night's sleep, Underwood travels to Maine, where he plans to spend the summer; along the way he meets Nadine Cross and the young Leo Rockway (known then only as "Joe" at the time, and behaving like a feral creature). The three travel to Ogunquit, where they find Harold Lauder's painted sign and decide to follow the directions. Underwood leads Cross and Joe to Stovington, Vermont, meeting Lucy Swann along the way. In Stovington, they find Lauder's directions to Nebraska. Underwood, who gradually finds himself in the unexpected role of a trusted group leader, brings a growing party of people across the country to Nebraska, and finally to Boulder.

Although Underwood is initially interested in Cross, she spurns his advances and he begins a relationship with Swann instead. Arriving in Boulder, Underwood settles down with Swann and Leo, becoming a member of the Free Zone Committee. Cross attempts to seduce Underwood but he rejects her, having committed to Swann. Underwood later breaks into Lauder's home with Frannie Goldsmith, after Leo instructs him to embark on an investigation before something horrible happens.

They find Lauder's ledger, in which Lauder has documented his intention to kill Stuart Redman. However, Lauder's plan is already in motion. Underwood leaves Boulder with Redman, Ralph Brentner, and Glen Bateman, after Mother Abagail instructs them to go to Las Vegas. Underwood leads the party after Redman breaks his leg during the journey to Las Vegas, where Underwood and Brentner eventually die in the nuclear explosion caused by the Trashcan Man.

In the 1994 miniseries, Larry was portrayed by Adam Storke. He does not meet Rita Blakemoor in New York, instead meeting Nadine Cross there, alone. He travels with her, but she abandons him. He later meets Lucy Swann and Joe, and travels with them to Boulder. In the 2020 miniseries, he was portrayed by Jovan Adepo.

=== Glen Bateman ===
An associate professor of sociology who went into retirement some years before the superflu hit, Glendon Pequod "Glen" Bateman met Stu Redman near his home in Woodsville, New Hampshire. A senior citizen with arthritis, Bateman often serves as a mentor figure to the younger Redman. Bateman also experiences dreams of Mother Abagail and joins Redman, Frannie Goldsmith, and Harold Lauder on their journey to meet Mother Abagail (and to satisfy a sociological curiosity as to how humanity will rebuild itself).

Bateman becomes part of the reform committee in Boulder and is later one of the four men who Mother Abagail proclaims must meet Flagg in Las Vegas. When Redman is seriously injured on the journey, Bateman is saddened to leave him behind. Bateman, along with Larry Underwood and Ralph Brentner, travels to Las Vegas where he is detained by Flagg's forces. Flagg offers Bateman his freedom on the provision that he "get down on [his] knees and beg for it." Bateman refuses, laughing at Flagg for being so transparent, leading Flagg to order Lloyd Henreid to execute Bateman. "It’s all right, Mr. Henreid", Bateman says as he dies, "you don’t know any better."

In the 1994 miniseries, Bateman was portrayed by Ray Walston. In the 2020 miniseries, he was portrayed by Greg Kinnear.

=== Ralph Brentner ===
Ralph Brentner, an amiable Midwest farmer and United States Army veteran, meets Nick Andros and Tom Cullen as their paths cross on a highway in Kansas; together they form the first party to find Mother Abagail. Despite a lack of formal education, Brentner possesses a great deal of common sense and is very skilled with tools and machines; he uses a powerful radio transmitter to contact other groups of survivors across the country. Brentner is elected to the first Free Zone Committee - a position he accepts with reluctance - and typically serves as Andros' "voice", reading his notes to the others during committee meetings.

Brentner survives Lauder's assassination attempt, losing the third and fourth fingers on his left hand, and is chosen as one of the four people to stand against Flagg. Along with Stu Redman, Glen Bateman and Larry Underwood, Brentner travels to Las Vegas and is instrumental in convincing Underwood to leave Redman behind after he breaks his leg. The three are captured by Flagg, who plans an execution by dismemberment in front of the Golden Nugget Hotel in downtown Las Vegas. Brentner is the first to notice the "Hand of God" as it descends from the sky to detonate the Trashcan Man's nuclear weapon, killing everyone present.

In the 1994 miniseries, Brentner was portrayed by Peter Van Norden. A female version of the character, named Ray Brentner, was portrayed by Irene Bedard in the 2020 miniseries.

=== Leo Rockway / "Joe" ===
Leo is a young boy, 11 years old, discovered alone by Nadine Cross in Epsom, New Hampshire. She found him dying on the lawn of his home of an infected animal bite and nursed him back to health. He acted in a feral way and would not speak—only communicating in grunts and growls—and refused to wear clothes aside from his underwear. He had violent tendencies, brandishing a kitchen knife that he refused to let Cross take from him. She called him "Joe", not knowing what his name was.

Upon discovering Larry Underwood, he became intent on killing him. Cross stopped him each time, insisting they continue to follow him in hiding to investigate him. However, in Maine, Rockway made their presence known, attempting to rush at Underwood with his knife. After disarming him, Underwood agrees to let Cross and Rockway join him in his journey to Nebraska.

Upon meeting Mother Abagail in Nebraska, Rockwood suddenly speaks, saying his birth name aloud and gradually abandoning his feral behavior. He becomes close to Underwood and Lucy Swann, beginning to fear Cross, referring to the two women as "Lucy-mom" and "Nadine-mom" respectively. Later, he tells Underwood of his premonition regarding Harold Lauder, prompting the search of his home and discovery of his diary.

=== Kojak ===
Kojak is Glen Bateman's dog, an Irish Setter, whom he adopted after his original master died of the superflu. Formerly named Big Steve, Kojak is a rare survivor of the superflu, which affects dogs and horses as well as humans (the book notes that cats are immune). When Bateman leaves with Stu Redman, Kojak is initially left behind. However, he follows his owner and is later attacked by wolves after arriving at Mother Abagail's empty house. Though injured, Kojak manages to walk to the Free Zone.

He joins Bateman, Redman, Ralph Brentner, and Larry Underwood on their journey to Las Vegas. When Redman is injured, Kojak stays behind, killing small animals to feed Redman and fetching sticks for fire-building. After being found by Tom Cullen, Kojak is taken back to Boulder. It is stated in the novel that he will live for sixteen years after his master's death, and that a female puppy is found near Boulder, indicating that the canine species will survive.

In the 1994 miniseries Kojak is a golden retriever mix, while in the 2020 miniseries he is a purebred golden retriever.

=== Susan Stern ===
Part of a harem of women who were taken captive by a gang of ex-soldiers and repeatedly raped, Susan Stern — a former student at Kent State University — is one of the women Stu Redman and his party rescue. (note: this version of her earlier experience is only in the revised–expanded version of the novel.) Stern becomes a member of the original Boulder Free Zone Committee and recruits fellow ex-captive Dayna Jurgens to serve as a spy on the West Coast. Stern is later killed by Lauder's assassination attempt on the committee.

In the 1994 miniseries, Susan was portrayed by Cynthia Garris. She is not rescued from the harem, but instead found by Nick Andros and his party on the road to Nebraska, and arrives at Mother Abagail's home along with Andros, Tom Cullen, Ralph Brentner, Dick Ellis and Gina McKone. After reaching Boulder, she begins a relationship with Brad Kitchener, the only technician, even trying to have children with him. In the 2020 miniseries, Susan is played by Lisa Chandler, although aspects of her character are applied to Dayna Jurgens instead.

=== Dayna Jurgens ===
Dayna Jurgens is a community college physical training (PT) instructor from Xenia, Ohio. In the revised-expanded version, she is one of the women whom Stu Redman's party rescues from the harem. While she initially displays some level of romantic interest in Redman, this does not extend beyond flirtation and a brief kiss before she leaves for Las Vegas. Jurgens's affectionate behavior towards Redman causes Frannie Goldsmith feelings of consternation; later, it is revealed that Jurgens is bisexual.

As the Boulder Free Zone begins to establish itself, fellow harem survivor Susan Stern recruits Jurgens to serve as a spy on its behalf and learn about Randall Flagg's operations on the West Coast. In Las Vegas, Jurgens works with a streetlight-repair crew and sleeps with Lloyd Henreid as part of her ploy to obtain information. While working with the crew, she observes Tom Cullen on a passing truck. Flagg, aware of her identity through telepathy, summons her to his office and attempts to make her reveal the third spy, whose mind he is unable to penetrate. She tries to kill him with a hidden knife, but he turns it into a banana.

To protect Cullen and save herself from torture, Jurgens commits suicide by ramming her head through a plate glass window and turning so that the broken edges cut her throat and pierce her eye. This act of free will marks the beginning of Flagg's downfall, as while he foresaw her assassination attempt and consequently thwarted it, he did not predict her suicide attempt and lost his chance to uncover Cullen. Enraged, he kicks her corpse around the office and later has Lloyd burn it.

In the 1994 miniseries, Dayna was portrayed by Kellie Overbey. As the harem subplot was cut from this version, she is instead introduced in a relationship with a man named Mark when she is found by Redman's party. Mark later dies of appendicitis, depressing her, mixing her role with that of Perion from the novel.

In the 2020 miniseries, Jurgens is played by Natalie Martinez. This version of Jurgens takes on characteristics of Susan Stern and Mark Zellman from the novel and retains her death scene, albeit toned down (stabbing herself in the neck with a broken bottle).

=== Lucy Swann ===
The first survivor encountered by Larry Underwood's party, 24-year-old New Hampshire housewife Lucy Swann survived the superflu while her husband and daughter died. Swann joins the party on its way to the Stovington Plague Center. Swann becomes romantically involved with Underwood, but senses her feelings are unrequited due to Underwood's strong attraction to Nadine Cross; Swann's feeling persists despite Cross's lack of interest in Underwood. When Cross finally decides to tempt Underwood, however, he rejects her and commits himself to Swann, much to her surprise. Swann supports Underwood during his tenure as a member of the Free Zone Committee, in addition to serving as a devoted wife and a mother to Leo Rockway. Unlike Frannie Goldsmith, Swann supports Underwood's decision to travel west to confront Flagg, unaware that she is pregnant. Swann takes care of Goldsmith during Redman's absence and, by the end of the book, has given birth to twins fathered by Underwood.

In the 1994 miniseries, Lucy was portrayed by Bridgit Ryan. The character does not appear in the 2020 miniseries.

=== Judge Richard Farris ===
Judge Richard Farris is a man in his late seventies who joins Larry Underwood's traveling party in Illinois. Usually referred to as The Judge, Farris is a sharp, well-spoken, educated, and insightful man who served as a judge in the 1950s but has since retired. Lucy Swann and Underwood become very close with Farris, and Underwood is upset when he successfully recruits Farris as the first of three Free Zone spies, but is unable to inform a distraught Swann of his whereabouts after he sets out. While drinking beer with Underwood, Farris accepts the mission before Underwood can even muster the confidence to make the request, as he understands the spies' importance, assuring a saddened Underwood that he will be fine. Farris attempts to infiltrate Las Vegas from the north, but is intercepted by a pair of Flagg's sentries on the eastern border of Oregon. They have been ordered to kill him without inflicting any head injuries, as Flagg wants to send the heads of any captured spies back to Boulder as a warning. Farris and one of the sentries are killed in a shootout that leaves Farris' head obliterated, a sign that Flagg's power is fallible, and Flagg kills the surviving sentry for disobeying orders.

In the 1994 miniseries, Judge Farris was portrayed by Ossie Davis, and travels to Boulder as part of Stu Redman's party, rather than Underwood's. The character was written as female in the 2020 miniseries, portrayed by Gabrielle Rose.

== Las Vegas ==
=== Randall Flagg ===
Randall Flagg, also known as the Dark Man, The Man With No Face, or the Walkin' Dude, is the main antagonist. He is the embodiment of evil, an antichrist-like being whose goal is destruction and death. In the novel, he's presented as diametrically opposed to Mother Abagail's personification of good.

Flagg's appearance shifts between human, demon, and various animals, and it is implied that he has lived many lives across many eras; "Flagg" is merely the name of the force's present form. Tom Cullen describes Flagg thus: "He looks like anybody you see on the street. But when he grins, birds fall dead off telephone lines. When he looks at you a certain way, your prostate goes bad and your urine burns. The grass yellows up and dies where he spits. He’s always outside. He came out of time. He doesn’t know himself." During the occasional passages told from Flagg's perspective, it becomes evident he does not know his origins and has no memory of his life before Captain Trips, though he vaguely remembers isolated, violent, or hateful events, such as participating in the Vietnam War, the Assassination of John F. Kennedy, Ku Klux Klan lynchings, race riots in the 1960s, the kidnapping of Patty Hearst, and a vague speculation that he was involved in Charles Manson's family. Most of Flagg's memories indicate that not only was he able to escape during the last moments of many of these events, they also nourished his evil nature.

Like Mother Abagail, Flagg appears to various survivors in their dreams, whereby he provides the dreamers with a choice; Flagg attracts those who are drawn to structure, destruction, and power. He rescues Lloyd Henreid from starving to death in prison and, with Henreid as second-in-command, establishes a community in Las Vegas, Nevada. Although Flagg possesses the ability to predict the future, along with several demonic powers, he begins to very gradually lose control as his plans proceed in an increasingly problematic manner. A weakness of Flagg's that turns out to be completely disastrous for him and his followers is his inability to read the minds or track the movements of individuals with mental deficits or illness, most significantly Tom Cullen. At the end of the novel, the "Hand of God" detonates a nuclear bomb, destroying Las Vegas and all of Flagg's gathered followers. The revised–expanded edition of the novel includes an epilogue in which Flagg, in a new incarnation, awakens in an unknown tropical location where he meets a primitive tribe. Flagg convinces the tribe's members that he has arrived to teach them the ways of civilization, identifying himself as Russell Faraday.

In the 1994 miniseries, Flagg was portrayed by Jamey Sheridan. In the 2020 miniseries, he was portrayed by Alexander Skarsgård. The former leaves Flagg's fate ambiguous, while the latter uses the expanded edition's epilogue of Flagg assuming leadership of the primitive tribe after he is seemingly killed by the Hand of God's lightning.

King revealed in an interview that Flagg was partially inspired by Legion; Flagg is a hollow demon filled with other people's fear, hatred, and resentment. However, instead of Satan, as has been suggested in relation to the Dark Man, King compared Flagg to 1950s serial killer Charles Starkweather.

==== In other media ====
The Dark Man character appears in many guises in other King novels and short stories, always with the initials "R.F." This powerful character is found throughout King's other stories, most notably in The Dark Tower series. It's through The Dark Tower series that readers have been able to further understand the multifarious character, as King reveals that he was born with the name "Walter Padick" and that his father was Sam the Miller of Eastar'd Barony. Padick was raped by a drifter at the age of 13 during an explorative journey outside of his home area, whereby the young man wanted to experience the wider world. Following the passing of numerous centuries, Padick became an emissary for the Crimson King and assumes a range of identities, including Randall Flagg. Flagg is also the main villain in The Eyes of the Dragon, set in a medieval world called Delain, and there are some passages in that book that allude to Flagg's immortality and "pure evil" status.

=== Lloyd Henreid ===
Lloyd Henreid starts off as a petty criminal once imprisoned for attempted rape. He, along with Andrew "Poke" Freeman, engages in a killing spree across Nevada, Arizona, and New Mexico, resulting in six murders, Freeman's death, and Henreid's detention in a Phoenix jail. If Henreid undergoes his scheduled trial, it is likely that he will be placed on death row under a new statute that reduces the delays and appeals in the capital punishment process. Once the plague hits, Henreid's fellow prisoners become fatal victims of the superflu, in addition to the guards. In the midst of the commotion, Henreid is forgotten in his cell and eventually becomes the sole-surviving inhabitant of the prison complex. Henreid's character demonstrates both resilience and an ability to forecast problems by rapidly concluding that his situation is growing dire well before the cessation of regular services to inmates. Henreid is able to save himself from starvation by eating food that he has saved, along with whatever rats, roaches, or other vermin he can catch—he also very nearly consumes the leg of a dead cellmate (in the revised–expanded version, Flagg insinuates that Henreid did indeed eat some human flesh, despite Henreid's attempts to hide the cuts in the leg before the Dark Man arrived). Henreid is found by Flagg, who frees him from his cell after Henreid, at that point starving and nearly delirious, agrees to be Flagg's right-hand man, despite Henreid's suspicion that his liberator is actually a devil. At this time, Flagg also gives Henreid a black stone with a red flaw to symbolize Henreid's allegiance to Flagg.

Henreid subsequently finds himself feeling more intelligent and able than he thought he was, running several of the day-to-day activities in Las Vegas and overseeing operations at a military base. Henreid attributes his newfound abilities to Flagg, although Jurgens later suspects that Henreid's natural ability to anticipate problems has only been amplified by a fear of disappointing Flagg through failure. For saving his life and elevating him to his second-in-command position, Henreid is fiercely loyal to Flagg, a commitment that persists despite his growing doubts over Flagg's overall power and control. The character's loyalty is further affirmed when he foregoes an opportunity to leave Las Vegas with several close friends; however, Henreid respects the decision of the men who plan to abandon Las Vegas and does not inform Flagg about the deserters. Flagg forces Henreid to shoot Bateman and, as Bateman dies, he forgives Henreid with his dying breath, saying "It's all right, Mr. Henreid.... you don’t know any better." At the execution of Underwood and Brentner, Henreid is then killed in the nuclear explosion caused by the Trashcan Man's atomic warhead. Prior to his death, Henreid's last words are: "Oh shit, we're all fucked!"

In the 1994 miniseries, Henreid was portrayed by Miguel Ferrer. He was portrayed by Nat Wolff in the 2020 miniseries, where instead of being killed by the explosion, he is decapitated by a metal ornament knocked loose by the Hand of God's lightning.

=== Nadine Cross ===
A teacher at a private school in New Hampshire, Cross has retained her virginity due to a vaguely defined, but powerful, sense that she is destined for something "dark and unique." After the outbreak of the superflu, Cross finds an emotionally damaged young boy whom she calls "Joe," who has regressed to a savage state of mind but trusts Cross and remains with her. Cross meets Larry Underwood when Joe finds him sleeping—Joe is working up the courage to kill the sleeping Underwood, but Cross intervenes. The pair secretly follows Underwood to Maine, where Joe attempts once again to kill Underwood, but is overpowered. After a discussion, Cross agrees to join Underwood and find other survivors. Cross is attracted to Underwood but her subconscious conviction that she must remain "pure" has further strengthened, and Cross begins to both fear and anticipate that she is destined to be with Flagg.

Upon arriving in Boulder, Cross begins to surrender to the seductive allure of Flagg. Joe, who has sufficiently recovered to the point that he reveals that his real name is "Leo Rockway", is suddenly reluctant to be in the company of Cross. Later, Rockway reveals that Cross had already known it was too late to engage in sexual relations with Underwood. Cross desperately proceeds with a final attempt to seduce Underwood, an act that would break her virginal commitment to Flagg and free her, but Underwood is, by this stage, firmly committed to Lucy Swann and rejects Cross's advances.

Cross eventually surrenders to Flagg completely, communicating with him with the use of a Ouija board — an echo of her terrifying experience with a Ouija board in college, when she was first touched by Flagg. Cross then seduces Harold Lauder and, although she will not do "that one little thing" with him, they are apparently free to sexually engage in any other manner that they wish. Cross uses Lauder for the purpose of an assassination plot against the committee. This plot is ultimately hindered by the return of Mother Abagail and Frannie Goldsmith's premonition, resulting in only two members being killed rather than all seven.

Cross travels west with Lauder, but when Lauder's motorcycle crashes, she states that Flagg allowed her to choose this method of death for him instead of allowing him to be killed by Flagg upon reaching Las Vegas. Lauder shoots at Cross and nearly hits her, suggesting that Cross may unconsciously prefer death to the dark consummation awaiting her in Las Vegas and also revealing limitations to Flagg's power. Cross continues on towards Las Vegas, until Flagg appears to her in the desert and reveals his true nature by raping her, an experience that is so horrific to Cross, despite causing her immense pleasure, that she falls into catatonia. Flagg takes Cross to Las Vegas and the pair resides in the penthouse suite of the MGM Grand hotel complex; Cross's pregnancy is announced shortly after their arrival. Cross eventually recovers sufficiently to taunt Flagg about his inevitable failure until, in his rage, Flagg throws Cross off the penthouse sundeck. Cross smiles as she falls and afterward Flagg observes that she had taunted him in the hopes that he would kill her.

In the 1994 miniseries, Cross was portrayed by Laura San Giacomo, taking on aspects of Rita Blakemoor from the novel. She meets Larry in New York, but leaves him after nearly sleeping with him, later being brought to Boulder by Teddy Weizak (portrayed by Stephen King). In the 2020 miniseries, she was portrayed by Amber Heard, while Isla Crerar portrayed a young version.

=== "The Trashcan Man" ===
Donald Merwin Elbert, better known as the "Trashcan Man", is a man diagnosed as schizophrenic with pyromaniac tendencies. He often found himself in trouble during his years as a youth due to his fixation with fire, and his nickname comes from his childhood habit of starting fires in trash cans. The Trashcan Man received electroconvulsive therapy at a mental hospital in Terre Haute, Indiana, before being incarcerated at the age of 17 for burning down a church. Upon reaching his 18th birthday, he was transferred to the state prison.

After the entire prison population has either died from the superflu or fled, the Trashcan Man escapes and returns to his (fictional) hometown of Powtanville, Indiana. He indulges his ambition of burning down cities, setting fire to oil tanks in Powtanville and Gary, Indiana. While running from the Powtanville fires, he vaults over a railing and breaks his right wrist; the fracture does not set properly and the injury eventually causes his hand to point away from his body at an almost 90-degree angle. Later, while setting the fires in Gary, he sustains severe burns to his left arm when a timing device he has placed in a tank ignites prematurely. The Trashcan Man abandons his original plans of starting fires randomly across America to join Flagg when the Dark Man appears in his dreams and promises him "great work" in the desert. After treating his severely burned arm, the Trashcan Man finds a bicycle and proceeds to travel westward with haste.

In the revised-expanded version, the Trashcan Man briefly travels with a cocky street thug named The Kid, who becomes severely intoxicated, forces the Trashcan Man to masturbate him, and sodomizes him with a pistol. When The Kid threatens to not only kill the Trashcan Man on several occasions (always for petty reasons) but also to overthrow the Dark Man, Flagg sends wolves to rid himself of this potential rival. East of Colorado's Eisenhower Tunnel, The Kid ends up trapped in a car and surrounded by wolves, which kill him when he eventually tries to flee.

With the threat of The Kid neutralized, the Trashcan Man continues west to Las Vegas, where he receives a black stone with a red flaw and becomes one of Flagg's key associates. Due to his savant talent regarding destructive devices, the Trashcan Man is assigned to search for weapons in the desert and assist in arming the fighter aircraft at Indian Springs Air Force Base. The Trashcan Man performs his duties with proficiency until, while being teased by fellow workers, a comment causes him to experience a flashback regarding his tormented youth.

The Trashcan Man undergoes a schizophrenic episode and reverts to his old destructive ways, destroying several trucks and aircraft, which kills all the experienced pilots in Las Vegas. He flees into the desert, overcome with anguish over his actions; at first he plans to kill himself, but later he seeks redemption by bringing Flagg the most powerful weapon he can find: an atomic bomb in the form of a nuclear warhead that has been detached from a missile. The Trashcan Man transports the warhead across the desert in a trailer attached to an all-terrain vehicle, contracting a lethal case of radiation poisoning in the process. The sickness has reached its terminal stage when the Trashcan Man arrives in Las Vegas. The Trashcan Man ultimately causes Flagg's apparent destruction, as the Hand of God descends from the sky and activates the warhead, destroying Las Vegas and every one of its inhabitants.

In the 1994 miniseries, the Trashcan Man was portrayed by Matt Frewer. In the 2020 miniseries, the Trashcan Man was portrayed by Ezra Miller.

=== Harold Lauder ===
Harold Emery Lauder is sixteen years old and lives in Ogunquit, Maine, at the beginning of the novel. He is the younger brother of Goldsmith's best friend, Amy Lauder, and is a social outcast at Ogunquit High School, where he served as an editor for its literary magazine and wrote a number of strange stories. Lauder's obnoxiousness and arrogance hinder his ability to interact with others and engage as an active member of the community in the novel. After the superflu wipes out the entire population of Ogunquit, except for himself and Goldsmith, the two head to the Stovington Plague Center in Vermont. Lauder leaves a prominent note on the roof of a barn, as it overlooks the most popular route into town, detailing their plans for future travelers. This ongoing effort by Lauder enables several other groups to join them in Colorado.

Lauder harbors an unrequited obsessive love with Goldsmith and perceives himself as her protector. When the pair meets Redman, Lauder initially refuses to accept Redman, even going so far as to threaten him with a gun; after a conversation in which Redman explains to Lauder that he just wants to accompany the pair and is not harboring any desire towards Goldsmith, Lauder relents. After the plague facility proves to be a disappointment, the survivors head towards Nebraska, before reaching Colorado to join Mother Abagail; the group picks up more survivors during their journey. Lauder attempts to profess his love to Goldsmith but is rejected. As Goldsmith becomes more involved with Redman, Lauder's jealousy grows.

Lauder seeks out Goldsmith's journal and finds she mocks him in her private thoughts, and considers him to be "immature". Lauder swears vengeance upon Goldsmith and Redman from that point onward.

Lauder becomes a respected and esteemed member of the Boulder Community. Due to the harsh conditions after the plague, he loses weight and his acne clears up; he finds that those around him view his intelligence as an asset rather than an isolating hindrance. His ideas are used to improve the conditions within the community, and he frequently volunteers for the toughest jobs in the Boulder Free Zone, including the removal of dead bodies. His newfound toughness and resilience earns him the nickname "Hawk" from the other work crew members as a sign of respect. Nevertheless, Lauder persistently finds it difficult to let go of his old self-image.

In a moment of emotional clarity, Lauder realizes that he is accepted and valued, and that he can choose a new life for himself as a respected member of society. Unable to cast aside his past humiliations and his feelings of betrayal from Goldsmith and Redman, Lauder instead focuses on vengeance. Lauder reaches the point of readying his gun to assassinate Redman, while scouting for a missing Mother Abagail, but does not pull the trigger when Redman invites Lauder over for dinner with him and Goldsmith.

Soon after this incident, Nadine Cross approaches Lauder and reveals an in-depth knowledge of his insecurities, hatreds, and fears; she also alludes to her own. Cross and Lauder enjoy a decadent series of sexual escapades, but Nadine does not allow Harold vaginal intercourse with her, as she has engaged in a supernaturally-inspired commitment with Flagg. Lauder succumbs to Cross' seduction, fulfilling Flagg's wishes by constructing a bomb to kill the Free Zone's leadership committee.

While those who meet Lauder suspect there is something troublesome about him, they keep their suspicions to themselves as they become preoccupied with the politics of the Free Zone and the recruitment of scouts to spy on Flagg. Nick Andros is an exception to this, unilaterally vetoing Lauder's appointment to the committee out of distrust. Larry Underwood thinks Harold is a politician type and has mixed feelings about him, while Leo Rockway refuses to even go near Harold and tells Larry that he feels scared.

Lauder detonates his bomb during a committee meeting, killing two members and five other people, after which he and Cross flee toward Las Vegas. Lauder wrecks his motorcycle after slipping on an oil slick; the accident is implied to have been arranged by Flagg, who distrusts Lauder's intellectual and traitorous nature. He survives with a badly broken leg and attempts to shoot Cross, who abandons him.

Realizing that he is dying, Lauder writes a note in which he takes responsibility for his actions and expresses remorse, and signs it with the "Hawk" nickname as a way of accepting the best version of himself that existed briefly in Boulder. Lauder then commits suicide by shooting himself through the mouth. Stu Redman and his traveling group later find the body but do not bury it, choosing to leave it intact beyond Redman's gesture of removing the pistol from Lauder's mouth. Redman is surprised to find himself wanting to avenge Lauder's death along with the bombing victims when he finally encounters Flagg.

In the 1994 miniseries, Harold was portrayed by Corin Nemec. In the miniseries, Stu's group does not find his body; instead, Stu psychically senses his suicide and grimly informs the others, stating bluntly "God rest his sorry excuse for a soul". He was portrayed by Owen Teague in the 2020 miniseries, which retains Stu's group finding his body.

=== Whitney Horgan ===
A former butcher, Horgan joined Flagg's group as a cook, described by Lloyd Henreid as a "fat, loud sack of shit" but also an excellent chef. He performs minor tasks but is highly ranked in Flagg's society, reporting directly to Henreid or Flagg himself. Horgan plans to flee to Brazil with several others after first asking a reluctant Henreid to join them, saying sadly that he would go to Boulder if he thought they would accept him there and adding "it's just...all gone bad here". Henreid ultimately refuses the offer, but quietly tells his friend he will keep his flight plan secret, while adding he will stay with Flagg until either he or Flagg is killed because he owes that much.

Horgan decides to take a "stand" against Flagg and publicly challenges him prior to the executions of Underwood and Brentner, leading to the realization from a few people in the crowd that Flagg has lied about what the Trashcan Man has done. Flagg initially tells Horgan that he had intended to let him leave without consequence, but then mutilates and eventually kills Horgan with a ball of lightning that emanates from his finger. The lightning that killed him gathers in the sky over the next few moments before descending as the Hand of God and activating the Trashcan Man's nuclear bomb.

In the 1994 miniseries, Horgan was portrayed by Sam Anderson. The character does not appear in the 2020 miniseries.

=== Julie Lawry ===
Lawry is an unstable, sex-crazed teenager who lives through the pandemic. Lawry and Nick Andros have sexual intercourse in the deserted store where they meet and then Lawry attempts to convince Andros to leave Cullen behind. However, when Lawry reveals her true nature, ridiculing Cullen's impairment and frightening him against Pepto-Bismol with a claim that the product is poison, Andros ultimately rejects her. Lawry then tries to kill them both with a rifle and ends up joining Flagg. In Las Vegas she recognizes Cullen and informs Henreid of Cullen's status as a spy. It is unknown if Lawry was killed in the nuclear explosion that destroys Las Vegas.

In the 1994 miniseries, Lawry was portrayed by Shawnee Smith and is inadvertently electrocuted when she trips over Whitney Horgan's body while fleeing from the Trashcan Man's missile warhead. She was portrayed by Katherine McNamara in the 2020 miniseries, where she is killed by the Hand of God's lightning.

=== The Rat Man ===
"Ratty" Erwins, also known as The Rat Man, is a pirate-like hoodlum. Erwins wears a red sash, a necklace of silver dollars around his neck, and a sword. The character is described, in Lawry's words, as "the only guy in Las Vegas too creepy [for Lawry] to sleep with; except maybe in a pinch". Erwins is killed in the explosion at the end of the book.

In the 1994 miniseries, The Rat Man was portrayed by Rick Aviles. He is first seen in New York when the plague hits, and says "The Rat Man forgive you, this time" when Larry bumps into him in an arcade. He later appears very prominently in Flagg's society, and accompanies Lloyd in sending the Trashcan Man to Flagg, later is among the group which apprehends Dayna Jurgens, and breaks Larry's guitar before he and Ralph are taken on stage to die by dismemberment. In the 2020 miniseries, a female version of the character named The Rat Woman, portrayed by Fiona Dourif, appears and is killed by the Hand of God's lightning.

=== "The Kid" ===
"The Kid" is a thug from Shreveport, Louisiana, who meets the Trashcan Man during the latter's journey to Las Vegas. The character drives an enhanced hot rod-style vehicle and has a fanatical love of Coors beer and Rebel Yell whiskey. The Kid is also ambitious, unstable, and easily angered, traits that the Trashcan Man discovers when the character nearly kills him for spilling a can of beer on a carpet. The Kid and the Trashcan Man travel together until they reach the blocked Eisenhower Tunnel. The Kid has revealed to the Trashcan Man that he intends to replace Flagg, so Flagg sends wolves that trap the Kid in a car. The Kid survives for several days until, facing starvation, he opens the car door and strangles a wolf as he himself dies.

The Kid's body is later found by Redman, Underwood, Bateman, and Brentner on their journey to Las Vegas. Underwood calls him "the Wolfman," wonders what his story is and notes on account of the wolf he strangled that "he hadn't been lacking in the balls department."

In the original edition, The Kid appeared as a minor character and only appeared in the Trashcan Man's flashbacks; the revised–extended edition includes the full story of The Kid's encounter with the Trashcan Man.

The Kid does not appear in the 1994 miniseries, nor is he mentioned. For the 2020 miniseries, Marilyn Manson was in talks to portray the Kid, but his part was cut out of the script during the writing process.

=== Jenny Engstrom ===
A former nightclub dancer, Engstrom awaits Flagg in Las Vegas with Ronnie and Hector and kisses Flagg's boots upon his arrival. She works for the group as a construction worker and becomes close friends with Jurgens, who is confused as to why Engstrom, whom Jurgens perceives as a "nice" person, is cooperating with an evil group. Later, Whitney Horgan informs Lloyd Henreid that Engstrom intends to flee the group, while Flagg tells Henreid that he already knows the names of people who want to leave, including Engstrom. Engstrom is present during the executions and is thus killed during the explosion of the nuclear bomb.

Engstrom does not appear in either adaptation, with aspects of her character given to Julie Lawry in both miniseries.

=== Barry Dorgan ===
Barry Dorgan is a skilled, affable 20-year veteran of the Santa Monica Police Department in California. Unlike many of those drawn to Las Vegas after the superflu epidemic, Dorgan is neither sadistic nor especially authoritarian, instead viewing the leadership in Boulder as simply too complacent to build an organized society. Grown cynical after many years confronting the worst in society, Dorgan rationalizes backing Flagg as the only feasible means of bringing back a semblance of order.

Dorgan is one of the sentries who intercepts Underwood, Bateman, and Brentner, who are all surprised by Dorgan's decent, professional nature, but make it clear his rational views do not excuse or exculpate his service on behalf of the vile, monstrous being he reports to. Dorgan stands guard over Underwood and Brentner shortly before their planned executions, dying when the Trashcan Man's nuclear bomb destroys Las Vegas.

In the 1994 miniseries, Dorgan was portrayed by Chuck Adamson. The character does not appear in the 2020 miniseries.

=== Bobby Terry and Dave Roberts ===
Bobby Terry and Dave Roberts are two of the men assigned by Flagg to guard the eastern border of Oregon, with instructions to intercept and kill Free Zone spy Judge Farris. The sentries have also been ordered not to inflict any head wounds, as Flagg wants to send the heads of any captured spies back to the Free Zone as a warning. Terry and Roberts are posted at a store in Copperfield, Oregon; while Roberts takes a nap one rainy day, Terry becomes distracted by a comic book and almost misses seeing Farris drive past. Terry and Roberts catch up to him, and Roberts feigns a friendly introduction as Terry prepares to fire from the car he and Roberts are using. Roberts shoots and wounds Farris, who returns fire without hitting either man; Terry shoots wildly in response, accidentally killing Roberts and fatally striking Farris twice in the head. Seeing that Farris' features have been obliterated, Terry panics and decides to head south. However, Flagg has observed these events while disguised as a crow, and he resumes human form and inflicts a slow, painful death on Terry (implied to take most of 18 hours) for disobeying orders.

In the 1994 miniseries, Terry was portrayed by Sam Raimi, while Roberts was portrayed by John Dunbar. In the 2020 miniseries, Terry is portrayed by Clifton Collins Jr., while Roberts does not appear.
