= The Ballad of the Flexible Bullet =

Short story by Stephen King

- Author: Stephen King
- Language: English
- Genre: Fantasy, Novella
- Published in: The Magazine of Fantasy & Science Fiction (1st release), Skeleton Crew
- Publication date: 1984
- Publication place: United States
- Media type: Print (Magazine & Paperback)

The Ballad of the Flexible Bullet is a fantasy novella by American writer Stephen King, first published in The Magazine of Fantasy & Science Fiction in 1984 and collected in King's 1985 collection Skeleton Crew as well as the 2000 collection Secret Windows. The title is in reference to the narrator's belief that insanity is a sort of "flexible bullet": it will eventually kill, but how long this process takes, and how much damage the bullet does before the victim finally dies, are impossible to predict. Since the publication of this story, King has occasionally used the term "flexible bullet" to describe insanity, in reference to this story.

== Plot summary ==
The main character is Henry, fiction editor for the struggling Logan's magazine. Henry receives an unsolicited short story called "The Ballad of the Flexible Bullet" from up-and-coming novelist Reg Thorpe, and considers the story to be very dark, but also a masterpiece. Through his correspondence with Thorpe, Henry learns of—and, due to Henry's own alcoholism, comes to believe in—Thorpe's various paranoid fantasies. Most notably, Henry and Thorpe believe that their typewriters serve as homes for Fornits, tiny elves who bring creativity and good luck. The story, told from Henry's perspective as he relays it in anecdotal form at a barbecue, concerns Henry's descent into Thorpe's madness. Meanwhile, Henry also struggles to get Thorpe's story published, despite the fact that Logan's is in the process of closing its fiction department.

== Connections ==
In the television mini-series Nightmares and Dreamscapes, a fornit's symbol can be seen on a letter in the story "Battleground".

== Major themes ==
Madness is the chief theme of the novella. The narrator is asked to tell a story about a young author who is driven insane by early acclaim. After naming and debating the merits of Sylvia Plath and other novelists, the narrator reveals to the audience his own personal experiences with insanity. Henry's drinking makes him susceptible to Thorpe's fantasies about Fornits and "They,"- shadowy antagonists never described in detail persecuting Thorpe and his Fornit.

Henry confesses that he experienced a drunken hallucination where he met and communicated with his own Fornit, making Henry an unreliable narrator.

The narrator, Henry, is a recovering alcoholic. Much of the novella describes how Reg Thorpe's delusions, although unrelated to alcoholism, mirror and amplify Henry's own irrational and self-destructive conduct. This could be considered a case of folie à deux.

"The Ballad of the Flexible Bullet" shares a common theme of fear of nuclear power with Stephen King's novel The Tommyknockers. While at a literary party, the protagonist of The Tommyknockers delivers a drunken rant about the dangers of atomic power. This is of course similar to Thorpe and Henry's fears of radium crystals and radiation poisoning. The novella mentions the case of the Radium Girls as an example of society's ignorance of the dangers of nuclear power.

As the novella is the story of a story told at a house party, "The Ballad of the Flexible Bullet" is a frame tale.

== See also ==
- Stephen King short fiction bibliography
