= For Owen =

1985 poem written by Stephen King

- Short story by Stephen King
- Country: United States
- Language: English
- Genre: Poetry

Publication
- Published in: Skeleton Crew
- Publication type: Anthology
- Publisher: Signet Books
- Media type: Print (Hardback & Paperback)
- Publication date: 1985

"For Owen" is a poem by Stephen King first published in King's 1985 collection Skeleton Crew. The thirty-four line free verse poem consists of eleven unrhymed, unmetered verse paragraphs. The poem concerns King walking his son Owen to school, as the boy describes a fantastical school attended by anthropomorphized fruit.

== See also ==
- Stephen King short fiction bibliography
