= Big Wheels: A Tale of the Laundry Game (Milkman No. 2) =

- Short story by Stephen King
- Country: United States
- Language: English
- Genres: Horror, short story

Publication
- Published in: New Terrors (1st released), Skeleton Crew
- Media type: Anthology
- Publication date: 1980

Chronology
- Series: yes
Morning Deliveries (Milkman No. 1)	—

"Big Wheels: A Tale of the Laundry Game (Milkman #2)" is a horror short story by Stephen King, first published in the 1980 anthology New Terrors, edited by Ramsey Campbell, and collected in King's 1985 collection Skeleton Crew. It was adapted from an unfinished novel called "The Milkman". The events in this story follow the events of the previously unpublished short story "Morning Deliveries (Milkman #1)", which appears in the same collection.

== Plot summary ==
The plot centers on two laundry workers named Rocky and Leo in a small Pennsylvania town in 1969. After finishing up a shift at work, the men drive around, getting drunk and searching for an auto-inspection station. The inspection certification on Rocky's car runs out at midnight and he needs to find somewhere that will renew it. They are drunk and getting drunker, drinking Iron City beers, which have the likeness of Pittsburgh Steelers players on them. They finally come across an inspection station owned by an old friend of Rocky's, Bob Driscoll. Rocky crashes the car into Bob's garage and in the ensuing verbal confrontation Bob recognizes him. They then reminisce about old times while Bob inspects Rocky's vehicle for certification. Rocky and Leo continue to drink; at one point, Leo falls into a drunken stupor.

After Bob approves the vehicle, Rocky and Leo depart, both very drunk. Later that night, Bob, who is in an unhappy marriage, kills his wife and burns down their home.

On the way home on a long, dark stretch of road, Leo tells Rocky that he sees a vehicle following them, implying that it is a milk truck. Rocky's wife had left him for a local milkman, Spike (the primary character in "Morning Deliveries (Milkman No. 1)"). Rocky's reaction is extreme; he begins speeding dangerously and reveals to Leo that Spike "kills people." Rocky's Chrysler crashes fatally into an oncoming vehicle that suddenly appears riding the median line.

It's revealed that Spike, the local milkman, is driving this vehicle and that he's indeed a serial killer, who plans to visit Bob's home and leave full cans of gasoline, suggesting that he will successfully influence Bob into killing his wife.

Although not directly part of the main storyline (which takes on a darkly humorous tone), it's implied that there are links between one of the men and an unsolved murder of a teenage couple, although it is probable that this is another murder committed by Spike.

== See also ==
- "Morning Deliveries (Milkman No. 1)"
- Stephen King short fiction bibliography
