= The Revelations of 'Becka Paulson =

Short story by Stephen King

- Short story by Stephen King
- Country: United States
- Language: English
- Genre: Horror

Publication
- Published in: Rolling Stone (first release), Skeleton Crew (limited edition)
- Publication type: Magazine (first release)
- Media type: Print (magazine and paperback)
- Publication date: 1984

"The Revelations of 'Becka Paulson" is a 1984 horror short story by American writer Stephen King.

== Publication ==
"The Revelations of 'Becka Paulson" was first published in the July 19 to August 2, 1984 issues of Rolling Stone magazine. It was included in a limited edition of King's 1985 collection Skeleton Crew published by Scream Press. The story was reworked and incorporated as a subplot in King's 1987 book The Tommyknockers. In 1991, "The Revelations of 'Becka Paulson" was included in the anthology "I Shudder At Your Touch" edited by Michele Slung.

== Plot summary ==
Rebecca "'Becka" Paulson accidentally shoots herself in the head with her husband Joe's target pistol while spring cleaning. The .22 Winchester Rimfire bullet lodges in her brain, and begins to have some strange effects. In a stroke of "luck", the bullet does not kill 'Becka, but her severe brain damage causes her to begin to hallucinate that the 3D picture of Jesus on top of the TV is talking to her. Over the following weeks, Jesus proceeds to tell her the deepest secrets of everyone she comes into contact with.

Jesus tells 'Becka that Joe is having an affair with Nancy Voss, who works at the local post office. Under the instruction of Jesus, 'Becka opens up the Paulson's television set and rewires it to fatally electrocute whoever touches the knob. After Joe's afternoon nap, he walks into the living room and goes to turn on the television, resulting in a gruesome scene where his body starts to burn to a crisp, turning black with his hair starting to smoke. As 'Becka watches Joe burst into flames, and the picture of Jesus explodes, she realizes that everything Jesus had told her was made-up and all in her head, caused by the bullet embedded in her brain. 'Becka, with a sudden change of heart, jumps up to try to save Joe, electrocuting herself in the process, and the two fall dead, the victim of a tragic quirk of fate that was in the end far from lucky.

== Adaptations ==
The story was adapted into a June 1997 episode of the television series The Outer Limits; Brad Wright wrote the teleplay, and Steven Weber directed. In July 2020, Deadline Hollywood reported that The CW is adapting the story into a one-hour drama series titled Revelations. However, The CW later passed on the show.

== Reception ==
Algis Budrys states that "The Revelations of 'Becka Paulson" "goes along just fine until the ending, which is so much less than what we have been built up for".

== See also ==
- Stephen King short fiction bibliography
- The Tommyknockers
