= Jumper (short story) =

Short story by Stephen King

- Short story by Stephen King
- Country: United States
- Language: English
- Genre: Short story

Publication
- Published in: Dave's Rag
- Media type: Print
- Publication date: 1959-1960

Chronology
"Thirty-One of the Classics"	"Rush Call"

"Jumper" is a short story by Stephen King. Originally serialized in the self-published newspaper Dave's Rag in 1959–1960, it was later collected in the 2000 work Secret Windows. It was King's first piece of fiction to be published.

== Plot summary ==
The protagonist of "Jumper" is Jeff Davis, a police counselor. Davis is summoned to the Chrysler Building in New York City after Robert Steppes, a "serial jumper", threatens to jump from the 15th floor. The police accidentally knock Steppes from the ledge he is standing on when trying to catch him with a hook, but he is able to pull himself back onto the ledge. After talking to Steppes, Davis becomes convinced that "although theoretically, any man can take his own life, few men could really commit suicide, and Robert was not one of those men" and walks along the ledge to Steppes, who ultimately does not jump.

== Publication ==
King wrote "Jumper" at the age of 12. It was originally published in Dave's Rag, a weekly neighborhood newspaper self-published by King's older brother David King in Durham, Maine using a hectograph, as a three-part serial from December 1959 to early-1960. In 2000, it was collected in Secret Windows, unchanged other than spelling corrections.

== Reception ==
Rocky Wood describes "Jumper" as "clearly juvenilia" but with "some sentences that are stunning when one considers a 12-year-old boy wrote them", noting "sophisticated thinking is evident". Patrick McAleer describes "Jumper" as "flash fiction".

== See also ==
- Stephen King short fiction bibliography
