= Beachworld =

- Short story by Stephen King
- Country: United States
- Language: English
- Genres: Horror, science fiction, short story

Publication
- Published in: Weird Tales (1st release), Skeleton Crew
- Publication type: Magazine
- Media type: Print (Periodical)
- Publication date: 1984

"Beachworld" is a science fiction short story by Stephen King, first published in Weird Tales in 1984, and collected in King's 1985 collection Skeleton Crew.

== Plot summary ==
"Beachworld" is set in an undefined distant future. Among the few clues to the date is the passing reference that the last of the Beach Boys died eight thousand years ago (hence, approximately in the 11th millennium CE).

Two crewmembers, Rand and Shapiro, survive the crash-landing of their spacecraft on an uncharted planet made up entirely of sand. Rand becomes hypnotized by the endless dunes and refuses to either move from the very spot he's standing on or drink water. Shapiro also feels drawn to the dunes but, unlike Rand, finds this hypnosis frightening and is relieved to go inside their shipwreck, where the dunes are out of sight. At one point he sees, or imagines, how the unnamed world once hosted civilized intelligent life, but over time the cities, bodies of water, and ultimately everything on the planet was overtaken and buried by the sand.

When another spacecraft arrives in response to Shapiro's distress beacon, the crew initially treat his account with skepticism. Rand fights them off, drawing strength from his eroded sanity. The captain sends out an android to force Rand to leave, but it quickly breaks down as sand gets into it. The sand also rises up to stop a tranquilizer dart a crewman fires at Rand. As the black glass burned into the sand by the ship's thrusters on landing steadily crumbles, the captain finally heeds Shapiro's demands to leave. The ship lifts off, narrowly managing to reach escape velocity as a giant hand-shaped wave of sand tries to bring it down. Rand stares up at the ship as it disappears and begins to pile handfuls of sand into his mouth.

== Adaptations ==
A live action version of Beachworld was released in 2015 by filmmaker Chad Bolling.

Another live action version of "Beachworld" from OneNinth & Pointed Pictures premiered online in 2021 as part of the Stephen King Rules Dollar Baby Film Festival.

== See also ==
- Stephen King short fiction bibliography
- The Invisible Enemy (The Outer Limits)
