= Sleeping Beauties (novel) =

Novel by Stephen King and Owen King

- First edition cover
- Author: Stephen King, Owen King
- Language: English
- Genre: Dark Fantasy, Horror
- Publisher: Scribner
- Publication date: September 26, 2017
- Publication place: United States
- Media type: Print (Hardcover)
- Pages: 702
- ISBN: 978-1-5011-6340-1

Sleeping Beauties is a novel by Stephen King and his son Owen King, released on September 26, 2017. The book was first mentioned during a promotional appearance on the CBC radio program q. Of the novel, Stephen King stated, "Owen brought me this dynamite idea and I've collaborated a couple of times with Joe. I'm not going to say what the idea is because it's too good."

The novel was officially announced in June 2016 and takes place in a women's prison in West Virginia during a strange mystical occurrence that causes all the women in the world to fall asleep. An excerpt was published on September 1, 2017, by Entertainment Weekly in their special The Ultimate Guide to Stephen King issue.

== Plot ==
In the impoverished town of Dooling, part of the fictional Tri-Counties region of Appalachia, a bizarre murder occurs when two men running a meth lab out of their mobile home are beaten to death by a mysterious woman, who then sets fire to the lab before allowing herself to be arrested by the local sheriff, Lila Norcross. At the same time, reports start coming in of a mysterious sickness spreading across the world, which causes women to fall into a deep sleep, cocooned in a strange material. Dubbed "Aurora" (presumably named after the princess of the same name, who is also known as sleeping beauty), the disease also causes the sleeping women to enter into a homicidal rage, attacking and brutally murdering any adult who tries to open the cocoons.

Lila's husband Clint, the chief psychiatrist at the Dooling Correctional Institute for Women, begins noticing Aurora occurring among his patients at the same time that the woman, who is given the name "Evie Black", is incarcerated there. As the disease continues to spread throughout Dooling, the local women become desperate to keep themselves awake, leading to looting and riots. Lila herself falls victim to the illness and is replaced by her alcoholic chief deputy, Terry Coombs, who in turn appoints Frank Geary, a former animal control officer with a short temper, as his second-in-command. Clint's superior, Warden Janice Coates, fires one of her guards, Don Peters, for sexual harassment; he drugs her with Xanax, leaving Clint to protect the dwindling number of still-awake female inmates.

Clint interviews Evie, learning that she is an "emissary" sent by an otherworldly being who believes that women are capable of building a society free of war, abuse and other evils she says are caused primarily by men. Clint, according to her words, is "the Man" whose purpose is to protect Evie for "a week or so", when she promises to cure the women of Aurora. Meanwhile, Frank and Terry deputize several new recruits, including Peters and a juvenile delinquent named Eric Blass, and gradually restore order to Dooling. Rumors of Evie's ability to sleep and wake without trouble spread throughout the town, leading Frank in a quest to start manipulating Terry to take her from the prison to somehow save the sleeping women. Clint's son Jared and his friend Mary manage to hide Lila and three other women in an empty house, worrying that Frank will use their bodies as hostages.

Meanwhile, in an alternate dimension, the women find themselves in a post-apocalyptic Dooling, which they refer to as "Our Place". Lila and Janice assume leadership, and the women begin to re-establish themselves, even as many mysteriously vanish (due to their bodies having been destroyed by men in the real world). A group sent to look for other survivors instead come across a magnificent Tree, which turns out to be the portal between Our Place and Dooling. Elaine Nutting, Frank's wife, tries to burn the Tree down because she doesn't want to return to the real world, but Evie sends an inmate, Jeanette Sorley, to stop her. Jeanette finds Elaine in the process of setting fire to the Tree and wrestles the lighter and a gun away from her. Jeanette then throws the lighter away and picks up the gun to put it in her belt. Before she can do so, leaves rustle behind her. Jeanette turns with the gun in her hand, and Lila then shoots and kills Jeanette by mistake.

Clint and his allies steal weapons from the police station, prompting Frank and Terry to assemble a posse to assault the prison and capture Evie. During the attack, two criminals use a stolen bazooka to blow up the station and part of the prison, killing fifteen women before Vanessa Lampley, a former guard, shoots them dead. Terry commits suicide out of grief and cowardice, Peters and Blass are killed, and most of Frank's men desert him, but he manages to reach Evie's cell. Clint, Jared, Janice's daughter Michaela, an inmate named Angel Fitzroy and an elderly volunteer, Willy Burke, try to persuade him to spare her life, even as Evie herself promises Frank that killing her is the only way to save his family. Realizing that Evie is trying to prove that men are inherently violent and should be allowed to die out, Clint uses guilt to force Evie to use her power to save Willy when his heart suddenly stops. Seeing this, Frank and the others allow Evie to return to Our Place, where she gives the women the chance to decide whether to return to Dooling or stay put. Ultimately, all of the women vote to return.

As sleeping women around the world awake from their slumber, life slowly begins to return to normal. However, Lila and Clint's marriage, already on shaky ground, falls apart, and they decide to separate, with Clint resuming his old job at a prison in a neighboring town and Lila resigning as sheriff. Haunted by Jeanette's death and seeking forgiveness, Lila drives out to where the Tree used to stand and asks Evie for a sign of her presence. A single brown moth (one of Evie's forms) then lands on her hand.

== Characters ==
=== Main ===
- Lila Norcross: Clint Norcross's wife, who works as the local sheriff. She brooks no backtalk and has a very dry undertone in her dialogue, heightened because of her lack of sleep; at the start of the story, she is working the night shift and had been up for over 12 hours straight. She continues to try to stay awake to help the town, but eventually succumbs to Aurora, at which point she takes leadership of the women in Our Place.
- Clint Norcross: A psychiatrist for the Dooling Correctional Institute for Women. He originally planned to be a private therapist, but quit to work for the prison on the first day after a patient named Paul Montpellier spent his entire session complaining about how he got kicked out of his house after having been caught having an affair. The women at the facility seem to favor him over other therapists because he treats them like people, not problems to be solved with exercises that don't work. He really believes that his patients can get better, and thinks often that "in a perfect world, x patient would never have been arrested." He believes most of the women to be good people, just luckless. Because of this, Eve chooses him to watch over her and prove that a man's world is worth saving.
- Frank Geary: The only animal control officer in town. He has an extremely short temper, yet somehow always manages to rationalize it. For example, when he punches a hole in his wall, he thinks, "sometimes you punch a wall to avoid punching the person in front of you." When he yells at his daughter, he thinks, "sometimes you've got to yell to be heard." Frank believes himself to be a good person despite his many flaws, excusing his lack of self-control as "Bad Frank" and labeling himself as "Good Frank". Eve considers him to be representative of what she considers to be the worst tendencies of men.
- Jeanette Sorley: An inmate imprisoned for manslaughter after she stabbed her violent husband in the crotch with a screwdriver while they were both high, and then sitting and watching while he bled to death. Clint thinks that Jeanette had acted out of self-defense, claiming that because of her husband's abuse, she would've either died or been emotionally traumatized for the rest of her life unless she killed him first. Jeanette has been on good report for a long time at the start of the story, and is currently working to get paroled so she can see her son. She is remorseful for her actions despite everything and wishes she hadn't turned out a murderer.
- Eve Black: A mysterious woman who is seemingly responsible for the spread of Aurora. She demonstrates several powers, including shapeshifting and communicating telepathically with animals such as rats. She justifies her actions by claiming a mission to determine whether men can survive in a world without women.

=== Minor ===
- Jared Norcross: Lila and Clint's only son. He's a lot like his father, both in looks and personality. He is somewhat insecure and has a good heart.
- Elaine Nutting: Frank's ex-wife. She's a very religious woman-in fact, they met at her church. She is currently separated from Frank on account of her inability to tolerate his short temper.
- Nana Geary: Frank's daughter. She has a talent for drawing and probably a bit of trauma from her father constantly yelling at her, yet she still loves him.
- Terry and Roger: Lila's deputies. They're described as being somewhat dumb and lacking initiative, with Terry in particular struggling with an alcohol problem. Lila says that Terry is the smarter of the two, but lacks the temperament to be a leader. Both men remain on duty when Frank takes over the sheriff's department and quickly fall under his sway
- Janice Coates: The warden of Dooling Correctional Institute for Women. She has a no-nonsense attitude and little patience, and has a good working relationship with Clint. She has a daughter named Michaela, who works for the news and was the first to tell her mom about the Aurora virus, which allows the facility to make vital preparations. Coates falls victim to the virus and helps Lila in Our Place, which inspires her to retire and reconnect with Michaela after the virus is reversed.
- Don Peters: A senior guard at the Institute who sexually abuses the inmates, and uses his position to block any complaints. When the Warden fires him, he drugs her with sleeping pills and walks off the job. He is then hired as one of Frank's deputies and dies while helping him assault the prison.
- Eric Blass: A classmate of Jared's who displays sociopathic tendencies, as shown in a scene where he and Don Peters murder a homeless woman by setting her on fire. Eric gets deputized by Frank, only to be killed during the prison raid.

== Reception ==
Among the positive reviews, The Guardian wrote "... epic, colourful story of global pandemic, and shows a youthful vigour not seen in years."

In 2017, it won the Goodreads Choice Award for the Horror Category with more than 50,000 votes. It was also nominated for the [[Bram Stoker Award]] for Superior Achievement in a Novel.

A review from a feminist point of view on bound2books.com acknowledges the novel's attempts to raise feminist themes, but criticizes the lack of representation of trans and intersex people, the surface-level exploration of the societal impact of women disappearing from key professions, and the hypersexualization and underdeveloped role of Evie Black.

== Adaptations ==
=== Television ===
In April 2017, Deadline Hollywood reported that Anonymous Content had purchased the television rights to the novel. In April 2019, AMC made a commitment to a pilot script by Owen King for an open-ended television series.

=== Comic books ===
In July 2019, Deadline Hollywood further reported that IDW Publishing would be releasing a 10-part comic book adaptation of the novel created by novelist Rio Youers and artist Alison Sampson. The first issue came out in June 2020, with the final issue releasing in March 2022.
