= Skeleton Crew (short story collection) =

1985 short story collection by Stephen King

- First edition cover
- Author: Stephen King
- Language: English
- Genre: Horror, science fiction
- Publisher: Putnam
- Publication date: June 21, 1985
- Publication place: United States
- Media type: Print (hardcover)
- Pages: 512
- ISBN: 978-0-399-13039-7
- Preceded by: Different Seasons
- Followed by: Four Past Midnight

Skeleton Crew is a short story collection by American writer Stephen King, published by Putnam in June 1985. A limited edition of a thousand copies was published by Scream/Press in October 1985 (ISBN 978-0910489126), illustrated by J. K. Potter, containing an additional short story, "The Revelations of 'Becka Paulson", which had originally appeared in Rolling Stone magazine (July 19 – August 2, 1984), and was later incorporated into King's 1987 novel The Tommyknockers. The original title of this book was Night Moves.

== Stories ==
#	Title	Originally published in	Notes
1	The Mist	Dark Forces (1980)	Novella
2	"Here There Be Tygers"	Spring 1968 issue of Ubris	
3	"The Monkey"	November 1980 issue of Gallery	
4	"Cain Rose Up"	Spring 1968 issue of Ubris	
5	"Mrs. Todd's Shortcut"	May 1984 issue of Redbook	
6	"The Jaunt"	June 1981 issue of The Twilight Zone Magazine	
7	"The Wedding Gig"	December 1980 issue of Ellery Queen's Mystery Magazine	
8	"Paranoid: A Chant"	Previously unpublished	Poem
9	"The Raft"	November 1982 issue of Gallery	
10	"Word Processor of the Gods"	January 1983 issue of Playboy	
11	"The Man Who Would Not Shake Hands"	Shadows 4 (1981)	
12	"Beachworld"	Fall 1984 issue of Weird Tales	
13	"The Reaper's Image"	Spring 1969 issue of Startling Mystery Stories	
14	"Nona"	Shadows (1978)	
15	"For Owen"	Previously unpublished	Poem
16	"Survivor Type"	Terrors (1982)	
17	"Uncle Otto's Truck"	October 1983 issue of Yankee	
18	"Morning Deliveries (Milkman #1)"	Previously unpublished	
19	"Big Wheels: A Tale of the Laundry Game (Milkman #2)"	New Terrors (1980)	
20	"Gramma"	Spring 1984 issue of Weirdbook	
21	The Ballad of the Flexible Bullet	June 1984 issue of The Magazine of Fantasy & Science Fiction	Novella
22	"The Revelations of 'Becka Paulson"	Summer 1984 issue of Rolling Stone	Featured only in the 1985 limited edition
23	"The Reach"	November 1981 issue of Yankee	

== Overview ==
The collection features 22 works, which include 18 short stories, two novellas (The Mist and The Ballad of the Flexible Bullet), and two poems ("Paranoid: A Chant" and "For Owen"). In addition to the introduction, in which King directly addresses his readers in his signature conversational style, Skeleton Crew also features an epilogue entitled "Notes" wherein King discusses the origins of several stories in the collection. The stories are collected from science-fiction and horror anthologies (Dark Forces, Shadows, Terrors, and New Terrors), genre magazine publications (Twilight Zone, Ellery Queen's Mystery Magazine, Startling Mystery Stories, Weirdbook and Fantasy and Science Fiction), and popular magazines (Redbook, Gallery, Yankee and Playboy).

Although published in 1985, the stories collected in Skeleton Crew span 17 years from "The Reaper's Image" (King's second professional sale when he was just 18 years old) to The Ballad of The Flexible Bullet which was completed in 1983.

The collection also features more personal works, including "For Owen", the poem he wrote for his son, and "Gramma", a horrific tale from an 11-year-old boy's perspective that seems to recall King's horrors living with his invalid grandmother.

Of one of the stories in the collection, King says: "As far as short stories are concerned, I like the grisly ones the best. However, the story "Survivor Type" goes a little bit too far, even for me."

== Adaptations ==
=== Film and television ===
"Word Processor of the Gods" (1984 Laurel TV, directed by Michael Gornick) was a 22-minute episode of Tales from the Darkside.

"Gramma" was adapted into an episode of the 1985 iteration of The Twilight Zone, written by Harlan Ellison. In 2014, it was loosely adapted into a film called Mercy, starring Chandler Riggs and Dylan McDermott.

"The Raft" was adapted as a segment of the 1987 New World Pictures anthology film Creepshow 2, with a script by George A. Romero, and directed by Michael Gornick.

"The Revelations of 'Becka Paulson" was adapted into a June 1995 episode of the television series The Outer Limits; Brad Wright wrote the teleplay, and Steven Weber directed.

The Mist was adapted into the film The Mist (2007 The Weinstein Company, written and directed by Frank Darabont), which was released on November 21, 2007; it was later adapted as a 2017 Spike TV series.

"Survivor Type" was adapted as an animated segment for a special episode of the 2019 Creepshow TV series with the main character voiced by Kiefer Sutherland.

A film adaptation of "The Monkey" directed by Osgood Perkins with James Wan as executive producer through his Atomic Monster production label was released by Neon on February 21, 2025.

"The Jaunt" was optioned to be made into a feature film by production company Plan B Entertainment, with Andy Muschietti set to direct, but no developments have taken place since the announcement in 2015.

=== Dollar Baby adaptations ===
The following stories have been adapted as Dollar Baby short films:

- Here There Be Tygers (1988), by Guy Maddin
- Cain Rose Up (1989), by David C. Spillers
- Paranoid (2000), by Jay Holben
- Here There Be Tygers (2003), by James Cochrane
- The Jaunt (2007), by Todd Gorman
- Survivor Type (2011), by Chris Ethridge and Jayson Palmer
- The Reaper's Image (2013) by Sammy Bates
- The Man Who Would Not Shake Hands (2022) by Nicholas Bromund
- Cain Rose Up (2022) by Miguel Marquez

=== Other media adaptations ===
The Mist was adapted as a 90-minute full-cast audio recording in 1984 in "3-D Sound" from ZBS Productions, released by Simon & Schuster, Inc.

In 1985, the American Library Association issued a series of posters that featured celebrities encouraging Americans to patronize their local libraries. In one of these, Michael J. Fox holds a copy of Skeleton Crew while a skeletal hand rests on his shoulder.

== Reception ==
Neil Gaiman reviewed Skeleton Crew for Imagine magazine, and described it as "500 pages of gorious goodies."

Skeleton Crew is critically held as showing King as a maturing writer with greater breadth and depth than his previous short works.

Skeleton Crew won the Locus Award for Best Collection in 1986.

== Reviews ==
- Review by Faren Miller (1985) in Locus, #291 April 1985
- Review by Michael R. Collings (1985) in Fantasy Review, June 1985
- Review by Doc Kennedy (1985) in Rod Serling's The Twilight Zone Magazine, July–August 1985
- Review by Don D'Ammassa (1985) in Science Fiction Chronicle, #73 October 1985
- Review by Algis Budrys (1985) in The Magazine of Fantasy & Science Fiction, November 1985
- Review by David Pringle (1985) in Interzone, #13 Autumn 1985
- Review by Roz Kaveney (1985) in Foundation, #34 Autumn 1985
- Review by Darrell Schweitzer (1986) in Science Fiction Review, Spring 1986
- Review by Andy Sawyer (1986) in Paperback Inferno, #63

== See also ==
- Dollar Baby
