= Morning Deliveries (Milkman No. 1) =

- Short story by Stephen King
- Country: United States
- Language: English
- Genres: Horror, short story

Publication
- Published in: Skeleton Crew
- Publication type: Anthology
- Publisher: Signet Books
- Media type: Print (Paperback)
- Publication date: 1985

Chronology
—	Big Wheels: A Tale of the Laundry Game (Milkman No. 2)

"Morning Deliveries (Milkman No. 1)" is a short story by Stephen King that was published in his 1985 collection Skeleton Crew.

== Plot summary ==
The story follows the morning route of a milkman named Spike Milligan in Devon, Pennsylvania. Milligan leaves various "surprises" in the milk bottles for his customers to find, including poisonous liquids, deadly gas, and venomous spiders.

== Publication ==
"Morning Deliveries (Milkman #1)" was published in 1985 as part of King's short story collection Skeleton Crew. It is a companion piece to King's short story "Big Wheels: A Tale of the Laundry Game (Milkman No. 2)", which also appears in Skeleton Crew. It was adapted from an unfinished novel called "The Milkman", in which the character was named "Spider Milligan".

== Adaptations ==
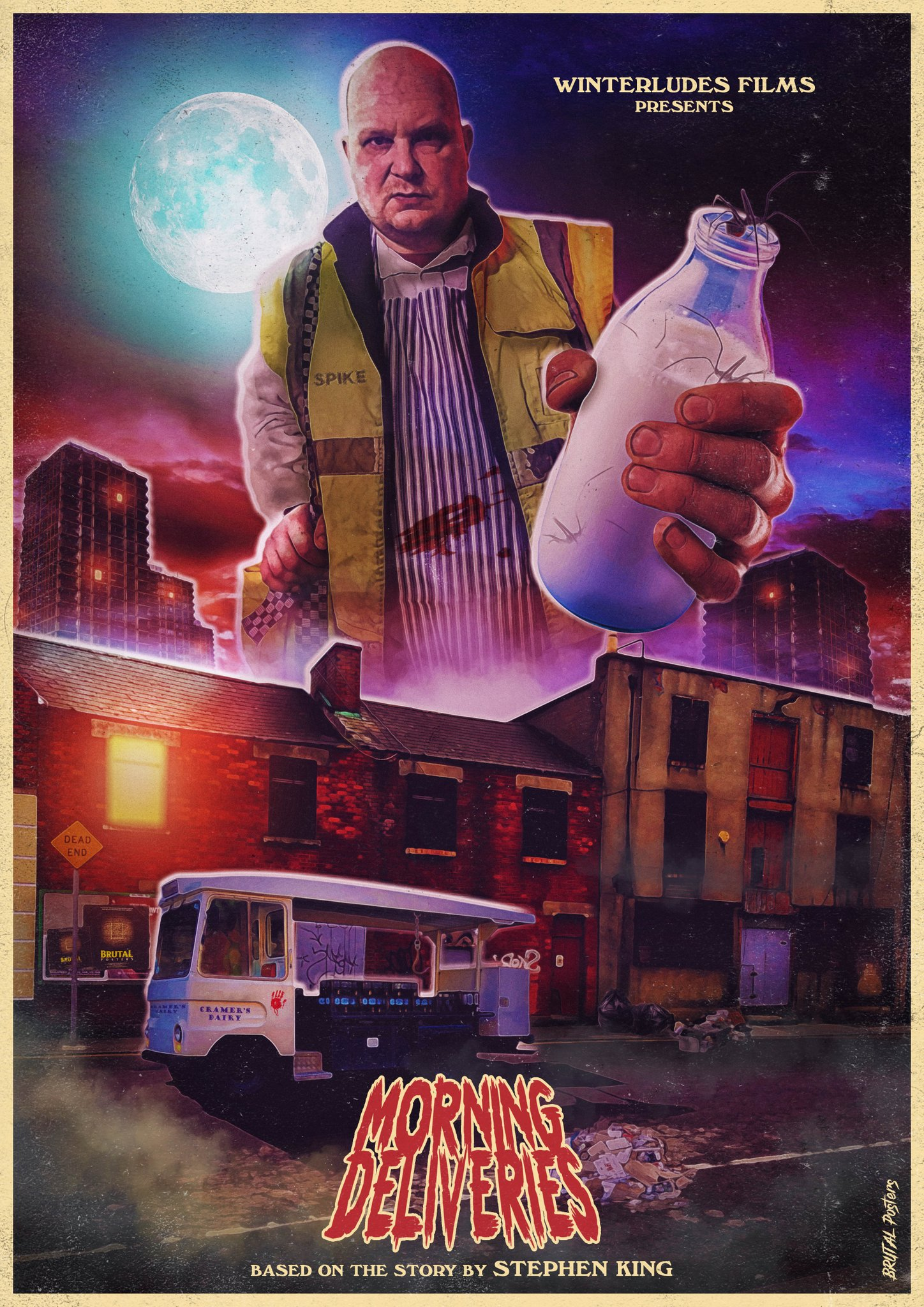
Landon Sweeney as Spike Milligan in Morning Deliveries: Part One.

A short film adaptation of the story titled Morning Deliveries: Part One and starring Landon Sweeney as Spike Milligan was released in 2019.

A short film adaptation of Morning Deliveries: Part One, starring Paris Peterson as Spike Milligan was filmed and released in 2020.

== See also ==
- "Big Wheels: A Tale of the Laundry Game (Milkman No. 2)"
- Stephen King short fiction bibliography
