= The Wedding Gig =

- Short story by Stephen King
- Country: United States
- Language: English
- Genres: Mystery, short story

Publication
- Published in: Ellery Queen's Mystery Magazine (December 1, 1980); Skeleton Crew
- Publication type: Magazine
- Media type: Print (Periodical & Paperback)
- Publication date: 1980 (first publication)

"The Wedding Gig" is a short story by Stephen King, first published in the December 1, 1980 issue of Ellery Queen's Mystery Magazine. It was collected in King's 1985 book Skeleton Crew.

== Plot summary ==
Told from the viewpoint of a bandleader in 1927 during the Prohibition era, the story centers on an Irish American small-time racketeer, Mike Scollay, who hires the narrator's jazz band for $200 (equivalent to $3,707 in 2025) to play at the Chicago wedding of his 350-pound sister, Maureen, and her 90-pound Italian American fiancé, Rico Romano. At the gig, Mike's enemy, "the Greek", blackmails a man to enter the wedding reception and insult Maureen in front of the guests. Shortly after, Mike is shot down in a hail of gunfire from the Greek's men.

The bandleader is approached a short time later in a bar by Maureen, who is despondent and depressed, feeling that she caused her brother's death and filled with self-loathing over her weight and the way she is aware other people perceiving her. After requesting a song, she leaves, and the narrator never sees her again, but he, like everyone else in the country, follows her story from that point on. Now Maureen Romano, she takes over her brother's racket, with her husband as her first lieutenant, and carves out a criminal empire that ironically far eclipses the operations of both her brother and the Greek, whom she soon hunts down and takes a gruesome revenge on. In 1933, Maureen dies of a heart attack and her husband, who does not share her leadership abilities, is sent to Illinois State Penitentiary the following year. The narrator sadly reflects on the cruel rumors that her weight had increased to 500-lb by that point.

== Publication ==
"The Wedding Gig" was first published in Ellery Queen's Mystery Magazine in December 1980 (and reprinted in its June 2004 issue). It was revised for King's 1985 collection Skeleton Crew. It later appeared in the 1999 mystery story anthology Master's Choice, edited by Lawrence Block.

== See also ==
- Stephen King short fiction bibliography
