= Rush Call =

Short story by Stephen King

- Short story by Stephen King
- Country: United States
- Language: English
- Genre: Short story

Publication
- Published in: Dave's Rag
- Media type: Print
- Publication date: 1960

Chronology
"Jumper"	"The Cursed Expedition"

"Rush Call" is a short story by Stephen King. Originally published in his brother's self-published newspaper Dave's Rag in 1960, it was later collected in the 2000 work Secret Windows.

== Plot summary ==
The story takes place on Christmas Eve. The "Scrooge-like" character Dr. Thorpe volunteers to attend the scene of a traffic collision, where a boy with acute appendicitis is trapped in a car. After successfully removing the boy's appendix in a four-hour operation, Thorpe gains an understanding of the "true meaning of Christmas".

== Publication ==
King wrote "Rush Call" at the age of 12. It was originally published in Dave's Rag, a weekly neighborhood newspaper self-published by King's older brother David King in Durham, Maine using a hectograph, in 1960. In 2000, it was collected in Secret Windows, unchanged other than spelling corrections.

== Reception ==
Rocky Wood describes "Rush Call" as "clearly juvenilia" but with "some sentences that are stunning when one considers a 12-year-old boy wrote them", noting "sophisticated thinking is evident".

== See also ==
- "The Breathing Method"
- Stephen King short fiction bibliography
