= The Stand (2020 miniseries) =

2020 American dark fantasy streaming television miniseries

- Television release poster
- Genre: Post-apocalyptic; Fantasy drama; Horror; Disaster
- Based on: The Stand by Stephen King
- Developed by: Josh Boone; Benjamin Cavell
- Starring: James Marsden; Odessa Young; Owen Teague; Alexander Skarsgård; Whoopi Goldberg; Amber Heard; Jovan Adepo; Henry Zaga; Nat Wolff; Irene Bedard; Brad William Henke; Greg Kinnear
- Music by: Nathaniel Walcott; Mike Mogis
- Country of origin: United States
- Original language: English
- No. of episodes: 9

Production
- Executive producers: Benjamin Cavell; Taylor Elmore; Josh Boone; Will Weiske; Jimmy Miller; Roy Lee; Richard P. Rubinstein
- Producers: Stephen Welke; Jill Killington; Knate Lee; Owen King
- Production locations: British Columbia, Canada
- Cinematography: Thomas Yatsko; David Stockton; Elie Smolkin
- Editors: Robb Sullivan; Matthew Rundell; Marc Clark; Rob Bonz; Robert Berman
- Running time: 49–65 minutes
- Production companies: Vertigo Entertainment; Mosaic Media Group; CBS Studios

Original release
- Network: Paramount+; Prime Video
- Release: December 17, 2020 – February 11, 2021

The Stand is an American post-apocalyptic TV series comprising nine episodes, based on the 1978 novel of the same name by Stephen King. Produced by Vertigo Entertainment, Mosaic Media Group, and CBS Studios, the series stars an ensemble cast led by James Marsden, Odessa Young, Owen Teague, Alexander Skarsgård, Whoopi Goldberg, Amber Heard, Jovan Adepo, Henry Zaga, Nat Wolff, Irene Bedard, Brad William Henke and Greg Kinnear.

The plot centers on a pandemic resulting from a mishap at a military biological research facility, which allows the escape of a lethal strain of influenza. After the pandemic kills almost the entire world population, the few survivors are drawn to one of two figures, Randall Flagg and Mother Abagail, setting up a final good-vs-evil confrontation. The adaptation alters details (gender, ethnicity, age, etc.) of some main characters, moves the setting to the modern-day 21st century, and features a new ending in the final episode co-written by Stephen King with his son, Owen King. The finale adds on the expanded ending of the 1990 version of the book making it the third variation of the story's conclusion.

The first episode was released on Paramount+ on December 17, 2020, and on Prime Video on January 3, 2021. The series received mixed reviews from critics, who praised its cast and production values, but some criticised its lengthy runtime.

== Premise ==
The Stand is described in CBS publicity as "King's apocalyptic vision of a world decimated by plague and embroiled in an elemental struggle between good and evil. The fate of mankind rests on the frail shoulders of the 108-year-old Mother Abagail and a handful of survivors. Their worst nightmares are embodied by a man with a lethal smile and unspeakable powers: Randall Flagg, the nefarious 'Dark Man.'"

== Cast ==
=== Main ===
- James Marsden as Stu Redman
- Odessa Young as Frannie Goldsmith
- Owen Teague as Harold Lauder
- Alexander Skarsgård as Randall Flagg
- Whoopi Goldberg as Mother Abagail Freemantle
- Amber Heard as Nadine Cross
- Jovan Adepo as Larry Underwood
- Henrique Zaga as Nick Andros
- Nat Wolff as Lloyd Henreid
- Irene Bedard as Ray Brentner
- Brad William Henke as Tom Cullen
- Greg Kinnear as Glen Bateman

=== Recurring ===
- Eion Bailey as Teddy Weizak
- Gabrielle Rose as Judge Farris
- Gordon Cormier as Joe
- Olivia Cheng as Dr. Sylvia Wen
- Natalie Martinez as Dayna Jurgens
- Katherine McNamara as Julie Lawry
- Fiona Dourif as the Rat Woman
- Ezra Miller as Trashcan Man

=== Guest starring ===
- Hamish Linklater as Dr. Jim Ellis
- Daniel Sunjata as Cobb
- J. K. Simmons as General William Starkey
- Kristy Dawn Dinsmore as Maria
- Heather Graham as Rita Blakemoor
- Angus Sampson as Garvey
- Clifton Collins Jr. as Bobby Terry
- Kendall Joy Hall as Young Abigail Freemantle

== Episodes ==
No.	Title	Directed by	Teleplay by	Original release date
1	"The End"	Josh Boone	Josh Boone & Benjamin Cavell	December 17, 2020
A lethal weaponized strain of influenza, known as "Captain Trips", is unleashed, causing an apocalyptic pandemic that kills billions around the world in less than a month, although a small number of people are immune and survive. Harold Lauder, a troubled teenager and geek, vies for the affections of his former babysitter Frannie Goldsmith, the only other survivor in their hometown of Ogunquit, Maine. Frannie, depressed at the loss of her father and pregnant with her now deceased boyfriend's baby, attempts suicide by overdosing on pills. Harold saves her, and the two of them leave Ogunquit in search of other survivors. In a flashback, Stu Redman witnesses the death of soldier Charles Campion, who was patient zero, in Arnette, Texas. Stu is taken in by medical authorities at the Stovington, Vermont CDC facility who hope to find the source of his immunity. After Captain Trips kills off the entire staff, Stu escapes the facility with the aid of dying General William Starkey, who admits to Stu that he was in command of the base where the virus was engineered, before he kills himself to join his dead family. In a flash forward to Boulder, Colorado where survivors have gathered, Harold works on a burial crew clearing corpses from the city, while Stu and a more pregnant Frannie have entered a marital relationship. Overcome with jealousy, Harold schemes to kill them. In a flashback, Campion is shown being subtly manipulated into spreading the virus by the sinister Randall Flagg, allowing him to escape the military base where it had been developed as a bioweapon. (In the original story, Flagg merely attributed the virus to human behavior and took advantage of the ensuing chaos to seize power.)
2	"Pocket Savior"	Tucker Gates	Josh Boone & Benjamin Cavell	December 24, 2020
In a largely-abandoned New York City, musician Larry Underwood meets fellow survivor Rita Blakemoor in Central Park, and they begin a relationship. Once they realize there will be millions of dead bodies rotting in the summer sun, the pair decide to leave New York. They encounter a small group of marauders who want to gang-rape Rita, but the pair escapes by traveling through the sewers. A few days later, overwhelmed by grief and depression, Rita dies by suicide by overdosing on pills. Meanwhile, career criminal Lloyd Henreid is trapped in prison in Arizona when Captain Trips kills the entire prison staff and all of the other inmates. Weak from starvation, Lloyd resorts to eating rats and cannibalism by eating part of the leg of his dead cellmate. After several days, he is visited by Flagg and swears loyalty to him in exchange for his release. Later, Larry arrives in Boulder with two other survivors, Nadine Cross and a mute child named Joe. Larry becomes one of the new community's leaders alongside Stu. He also meets a Native American woman, Ray Brentner, who serves as the personal assistant to Mother Abagail Freemantle.
3	"Blank Page"	Danielle Krudy & Bridget Savage Cole	Jill Killington & Owen King	December 31, 2020
In a flashback to her childhood, Flagg makes contact with Nadine through a Ouija board and promises she will be his queen. In the present, the adult Nadine, a teacher who is a 30-year-old virgin, joins up with Joe, and the two of them run into Larry near Des Moines, Iowa. At first reluctant to bring them along, Larry bonds with Joe over playing the guitar. Elsewhere, Stu encounters Frannie and Harold, but Harold's jealousy prevents Stu from joining them. Stu then meets sociology professor Glen Bateman and his dog Kojak. Stu is surprised to see Kojak, as Captain Trips also killed most domesticated animals. Glen has painted pictures of Mother Abagail, whom they have both had dreams about, and of a visibly-pregnant Frannie. Meanwhile, Nick Andros, a deaf-mute temp worker, is attacked in a bar in Shoyo, Arkansas by a group of redneck barflies and loses an eye. Rejecting Flagg's temptations in a dream, Nick chooses to go to Mother Abagail. Later, he meets Tom Cullen in Oklahoma, an illiterate man with a mental learning disability who spells all words that are important to him as M-O-O-N. Months later, in Boulder, Mother Abagail and her ruling Boulder Free Zone committee (Stu, Frannie, Larry, Glen, and Nick) encounter a Vegas escapee with crucifixion wounds, who warns them of Flagg. Flagg orders Nadine to seduce Harold and then get his help to kill Mother Abagail and the committee.
4	"The House of the Dead"	Danielle Krudy & Bridget Savage Cole	Jill Killington & Owen King and Benjamin Cavell & Eric Dickinson	January 7, 2021
On the road together, Harold confesses his feelings to Frannie, but she rejects him. They are ambushed by a serial rapist holding two women captive. Stu and Glen arrive and, after a brief firefight, one of the rapist's captives is killed and the other, Dayna Jurgens, breaks free and kills him with a pipe. Stu, Glen, Frannie, Harold, and Dayna travel together towards Boulder. Meanwhile, Nick and Tom, also traveling to Boulder, encounter an unstable and vicious woman named Julie Lawry in a small town in Kansas. After her cruelty to Tom leads Nick to reject her, she attempts to shoot them both as they leave. Nick and Tom look at a poster with the words 'Hemingford Home' on it, in which there is a family sitting around a table. In Boulder, the committee votes to send three spies across the mountains to assess the threat from Flagg who may be planning an attack on Boulder. Frannie nominates Dayna Jurgens, Larry nominates Judge Farris, and Glen nominates Tom Cullen. Stu and Glen instruct Tom to come back to Boulder when the moon is full. Nadine seduces Harold while still keeping her virginity, and convinces him to help her kill Mother Abagail and the committee. While stealing explosives for this purpose, Nadine kills Teddy Weizak, one of Harold's friends.
5	"Fear and Loathing in New Vegas"	Chris Fisher	Jill Killington & Knate Lee	January 14, 2021
Dayna Jurgens arrives in New Vegas where she secures a position as one of Lloyd Henreid's girls. She finally meets Flagg, who reveals that he knows who she really is, and offers to let her go on the condition that she reveal who the "third spy" is. Flagg states that he could always see Dayna and Judge Farris with his powers, but every time he tried to see the third spy, all he could see was the Moon. Dayna kills herself to avoid revealing any secrets. In Boulder, Harold is haunted by Teddy's death. Stu and Frannie, suspicious of Harold, invite him over for dinner so that Larry can break into Harold's house and snoop around. Nadine tries to seduce Larry, knowing that if she gives him her virginity it will free her from Flagg, but he rejects her. Harold, suspicious of Frannie's dinner offer, sets up cameras in his home, and catches Larry on video in his house. Mother Abagail is upset about the committee sending spies west and prays to God for advice, only to be attacked by Flagg in his wolf-form. The next morning, Ray Brentner arrives at her house to find her gone, having left a cryptic note.
6	"The Vigil"	Chris Fisher	Jill Killington & Knate Lee	January 21, 2021
Donald Merwin Elbert, aka "Trashcan Man", arrives in New Vegas where Flagg orders him to use his pyromaniac weapons-sensing ability to find a nuclear bomb, which Flagg plans to use against Boulder. One of Lloyd's men kills Judge Farris, angering Flagg, who wanted to force her to reveal the last spy. Flagg figures it out too late as Tom has already left Vegas hiding in a truck carrying corpses. In Boulder, Mother Abagail has ventured into the woods to commune with God and atone for her sin of pride, and to try and figure out God's plan. She is confronted by Flagg, who taunts and attacks her. Harold and Nadine rig Mother Abagail's house with explosives, planning to set it off during a vigil for her. Joe warns Larry of Nadine's duplicity just as he realizes that the batteries in his walkie-talkie have been removed, and his motorcycle has been sabotaged. Frannie breaks into Harold's house and finds his surveillance-room and explosives. Harold finds her and tries to trap her, but she manages to escape. Joe hears Mother Abagail's voice and finds her in the woods, where she is rescued. Harold and Nadine activate the explosives just as Frannie arrives to warn the committee. The blast kills many, including Nick.
7	"The Walk"	Vincenzo Natali	Owen King	January 28, 2021
Following the explosion, Harold and Nadine leave Boulder on their motorcycles to join Flagg's group in Vegas. Nadine tricks Harold, and he loses control of his motorcycle on a curve and is impaled by a tree branch when he tumbles down a ravine. Nadine leaves him there to die, telling him it's for the best. Over the next few days, as he is dying, Harold writes his final thoughts in his journal before committing suicide by shooting himself in the head through his mouth. Nadine meets Flagg in the desert, where she finally gives herself to him sexually. Flagg reveals his true demonic form to a horrified Nadine. From her hospital bed, Mother Abagail reveals God's will to Stu, Larry, Ray, and Glen: they are to travel to New Vegas by foot to make a final "stand" against Flagg and his followers, and that "one will fall" on the way there. She then dies peacefully. After saying their goodbyes, the four journey westward with Kojak following them. They encounter Harold's remains a few days later, and Larry reads his journal before covering his body. While climbing out of a steep washed-out area, Stu falls and breaks his leg. Larry, Ray and Glen recognize Mother Abagail's prediction and go on without him. A short time later, Kojak returns to stay with Stu. The other three eventually enter New Vegas where they are arrested and taken to Flagg's hotel. They are greeted by Nadine, who sees herself as beautiful and glamorous, but in truth is emaciated, ghostly pale, and very pregnant.
8	"The Stand"	Vincenzo Natali	Benjamin Cavell & Taylor Elmore	February 4, 2021
Glen, Ray, and Larry are given a show trial in front of a large public gathering. Glen mocks Flagg and the crowd's fear of him, prompting Lloyd to shoot and kill him. Flagg appears weakened by these actions. Ray and Larry are separated, and Nadine visits Larry to try to get him to understand his situation. Instead, he shows Nadine her own reflection, the shock of which causes Nadine to go into labor. Realizing that she was never meant to live after giving birth, Nadine throws herself out of a window to her death, angering Flagg at the loss of his son. Larry and Ray are sentenced to be drowned in a swimming pool, viewed by everyone in New Vegas. Larry declares that he "shall fear no evil." Slowly some of the residents begin to join Larry in his chant, and Flagg begins to lose his grip on the crowd. Trashcan Man arrives with a nuclear bomb while showing signs of advanced radiation poisoning. A mysterious storm-cloud, which some the men identify as "the hand of God", forms above the hotel and emits bolts of lightning that kill everyone present, and finally destroy Flagg. The lightning then detonates the nuclear bomb, obliterating all of New Vegas and everyone in it. Stu, from his position in the wash out, witnesses the nuclear explosion, just as Tom finds Kojak and follows him. Back in Boulder, Joe feels Flagg's death, and they see the red glow of the explosion to the west. Frannie goes into labor.
9	"The Circle Closes"	Josh Boone	Stephen King	February 11, 2021
Frannie gives birth to a girl whom she names Abagail, after Mother Abagail. The baby becomes infected with Captain Trips but recovers, and over the coming months more babies are born in Boulder who are also immune to the disease. Stu, Tom, and Kojak eventually return to Boulder, and Stu reunites with Frannie. Several months later Stu, Frannie, and baby Abagail leave Boulder with Kojak to head back to Frannie's hometown in Maine. Passing through Nebraska, they stay at an abandoned house in the midst of a cornfield, which is being watched over by a mysterious young girl. While Stu heads into a nearby town to get more supplies, Frannie is frightened by the returned spirit of Flagg. She falls down a water well and is badly injured. Frannie awakes in a jungle, where Flagg shows her a tribal village of illiterate people who were unaffected by the superflu, and offers to heal her and return her to her daughter if she agrees to let him use her from time-to-time to see what is going on in the world. She refuses and flees, angering and disappointing Flagg. Frannie then encounters Mother Abagail's spirit who predicts that she will have four more children with Stu and her descendants will repopulate the world. Stu returns and, with the help of the little girl, who is implied to be the spirit of a young Mother Abagail, rescues Frannie. The girl miraculously heals Frannie's injuries before disappearing. Days later, Stu and Frannie finally arrive in Ogunquit. While watching the sun rise over the ocean they discuss having more children, and ponder mankind's future. Back in the jungle, weakened and taking on the new name "Russell Faraday", Flagg appears nude before the primitive tribe. He kills one of their warriors with his dark magic, and, rising into the air, demands their worship. The tribe, terrified of him, falls to their knees, which helps Flagg regain his strength.

== Production ==
=== Development ===
In January 2011, Warner Bros. Pictures and CBS Films were developing a feature-length film adaptation of author Stephen King's 1978 novel The Stand, which had previously been adapted as a 1994 miniseries. In August 2011, David Yates was hired to direct with Steve Kloves writing the screenplay. They subsequently left the project with Yates later explaining that he felt it would work better as a miniseries. In October 2011, Ben Affleck was named as the new director. In January 2012, David Kajganich was hired to write the screenplay. In an interview in November 2012, Affleck admitted that he was having difficulty with the adaptation.

According to Kajganich, when he was hired, the plan was to make a two-film adaptation. Kajganich claimed he finished the first draft of part one, only for Warner Bros. to change their minds and change the project to a single film. Kajganich then scripted a one-film version. In August 2013, Scott Cooper replaced Affleck as director. In November 2013, Cooper left the project. Cooper later stated that he was unable to make the story fit into one film.

On February 25, 2014, Josh Boone was hired to write and direct the adaptation. He later revealed that he wanted Christian Bale to play Randall Flagg and Matthew McConaughey for the role of Stu Redman. By September 10, 2014, the script had been completed and pre-production was underway. In November, Boone planned to split his adaptation into four full-length feature films in an effort to remain true to the breadth of King's sprawling novel. In June 2015, Warner Bros. proposed an eight-part Showtime miniseries to set up the story, which would culminate in Josh Boone's film. However, in February 2016, The Stand project was put on hold and the rights reverted to CBS Films.

In September 2017, King talked of doing an extended TV series on Showtime or Paramount+. On March 30, 2018, it was reported that CBS All Access were redeveloping the project into a ten-hour limited series with Boone still attached to serve as director. In January 2019, a 10-hour limited series was ordered by CBS Television Studios to be broadcast on CBS All Access. The production features Stephen King's son Owen King as a producer and writer, and a new ending written by Stephen King. The episode count was reduced to nine episodes after the writing process had finished.

=== Casting ===
In June 2019, James Marsden, Amber Heard, Whoopi Goldberg, Greg Kinnear, Odessa Young and Henry Zaga were all in consideration for the roles of Stu Redman, Nadine Cross, Mother Abagail, Glen Bateman, Frannie Goldsmith and Nick Andros, respectively. On July 8, Marilyn Manson confirmed in an interview with Revolver that he had been cast in an undisclosed role and also recorded a cover of The Doors' "The End" with Shooter Jennings for inclusion in the miniseries. However, it could not be used due to the series' tight budget.

By August 1, Marsden, Heard, Young, and Zaga were all cast in the series. According to news reports, Stephen King wrote an entirely different ending to the final chapter of the series that is different from either the book or coda. The last episodes were written by King and his son Owen. On September 11, 2019, Alexander Skarsgård was cast as Randall Flagg. Confirmed cast members included Goldberg, Jovan Adepo, Owen Teague, Brad William Henke, and Daniel Sunjata for the roles of Mother Abagail, Larry Underwood, Harold Lauder, Tom Cullen, and Cobb respectively.

By September 13, 2019, production on the series had begun. In October, Nat Wolff, Eion Bailey, Katherine McNamara, Hamish Linklater and Heather Graham were added to the cast. Natalie Martinez was confirmed to have a role in the series in December 2019, and confirmed that she was playing Dayna Jurgens in the comments section of an Instagram post. In January 2020, Clifton Collins Jr. revealed on Instagram that he would play the minor role of Bobby Terry. In their interview with GQ in March 2020, Ezra Miller confirmed they had a role in the series which was undisclosed but later revealed to be Trashcan Man. With this news, it was revealed that Marilyn Manson was in talks to play The Kid but that his part was cut out of the script during the writing process. In May 2020, Vanity Fair revealed the first look at Gordon Cormier as Joe.

On August 19, 2020, Mick Garris, the director of the 1994 miniseries adaptation, confirmed that he would have a non-speaking cameo in the new series. On December 3, 2020, showrunner Ben Cavell revealed during the Television Critics Association virtual panel presentation for the series that Stephen King would have a cameo.

On August 7, 2019, the Daily Moth reported that Josh Boone cast a hearing actor (Henry Zaga) over a deaf actor for the role of a deaf character, Nick Andros. This sparked a backlash from multiple well-known deaf actors. A deaf man from Los Angeles, Jared Perez-DeBusk, had a brief conversation on Instagram with Boone, sharing the exchange in a vlog and showed screenshots in the comments section. In the comments, Boone explained that the deaf character, in his dreams and when he turns into a ghost, can speak and hear, so it is acceptable to have a hearing actor because the character is both deaf and hearing depending on whether he is asleep or awake. Boone said Zaga is a dedicated actor and has been hard at work learning ASL, and that there would be deaf consultants on set. CAD Media said on Twitter that there would be a meeting on August 7, 2019, between the miniseries' production team and CBS on this issue.

In August 2020, Fiona Dourif and Irene Bedard were cast as gender-swapped versions of The Rat Man and Ralph Brentner, respectively. On December 11, 2020, Gabrielle Rose's role as The Judge was confirmed. On December 16, 2020, J. K. Simmons was confirmed to play a supporting character, later revealed to be General Starkey. Bryan Cranston has a voice cameo role as the President of the United States.

=== Filming ===
The production filmed in and near Vancouver, British Columbia from September 2019 to March 2020.

During filming, the working title "Radio Nowhere" was used. Specific filming locations included the Ladner Trunk Road in Ladner, British Columbia for some small town downtown areas and downtown Vancouver; for example, the latter was used for filming a dead body hanging from a building, as well as other "dead bodies, trash & debris, shouting of coarse language & gunfire", according to news reports. South Surrey’s (pink) Pacific Inn, the "quaint" downtown area of Port Coquitlam standing in for parts of Boulder, Colorado and other areas of the Lower Mainland. Exteriors of the home of Mother Abagail were filmed at a house built for the production in Ladner.

The production completed filming a few days before it would have been shut down due to the COVID-19 pandemic.

=== Music ===
The original score for the series was composed by Nate Walcott and Mike Mogis, who have collaborated with Josh Boone on Stuck in Love (2012) and The Fault in Our Stars (2014).

== Release ==
The miniseries premiered on December 17, 2020, with a new episode that was released weekly. In March 2021, Amazon Prime Video began streaming the series in some countries.

== Reception ==
On the review aggregator Rotten Tomatoes, it has an approval rating of 57%, based on 58 critic reviews. The website's critics consensus reads, "Despite an A-list cast and a smattering of poignant moments, The Stand's extended runtime doesn't make for better storytelling, leaving its expansive cast stranded in a cluttered apocalypse." Metacritic gives it a weighted average score of 56 out of 100 based on 24 critic reviews, indicating "mixed to average reviews".

=== Accolades ===
Award	Date of ceremony	Category	Recipient(s)	Result	Ref(s)
Visual Effects Society Awards	2022	Outstanding Visual Effects in a Photoreal Episode	Jake Braver, Phillip Hoffman, Laurent Hugueniot, Vincent Papaix	Nominated	

== Home media ==
Paramount Home Media Distribution released the series on Blu-ray on October 5, 2021.

== See also ==
- The Stand (1994 miniseries)
