= Owen King =

American writer (born 1977)

- Born: Owen Philip King; February 21, 1977 (age 49); Bangor, Maine, U.S.
- Education: Vassar College; Columbia University
- Occupation: Author
- Spouse: Kelly Braffet (m. 2007)
- Parents: Stephen King (father); Tabitha King (mother)
- Relatives: Joe Hill (brother)
- Website: www.owen-king.com

Owen Philip King (born February 21, 1977) is an American author of novels and graphic novels, and a television film producer. He published his first book, We're All in This Together, in 2005 to generally positive reviews, but his first full-length novel, Double Feature, had a less enthusiastic reception. King collaborated with his father, writer Stephen King, in the writing of the novel Sleeping Beauties.

== Early life ==
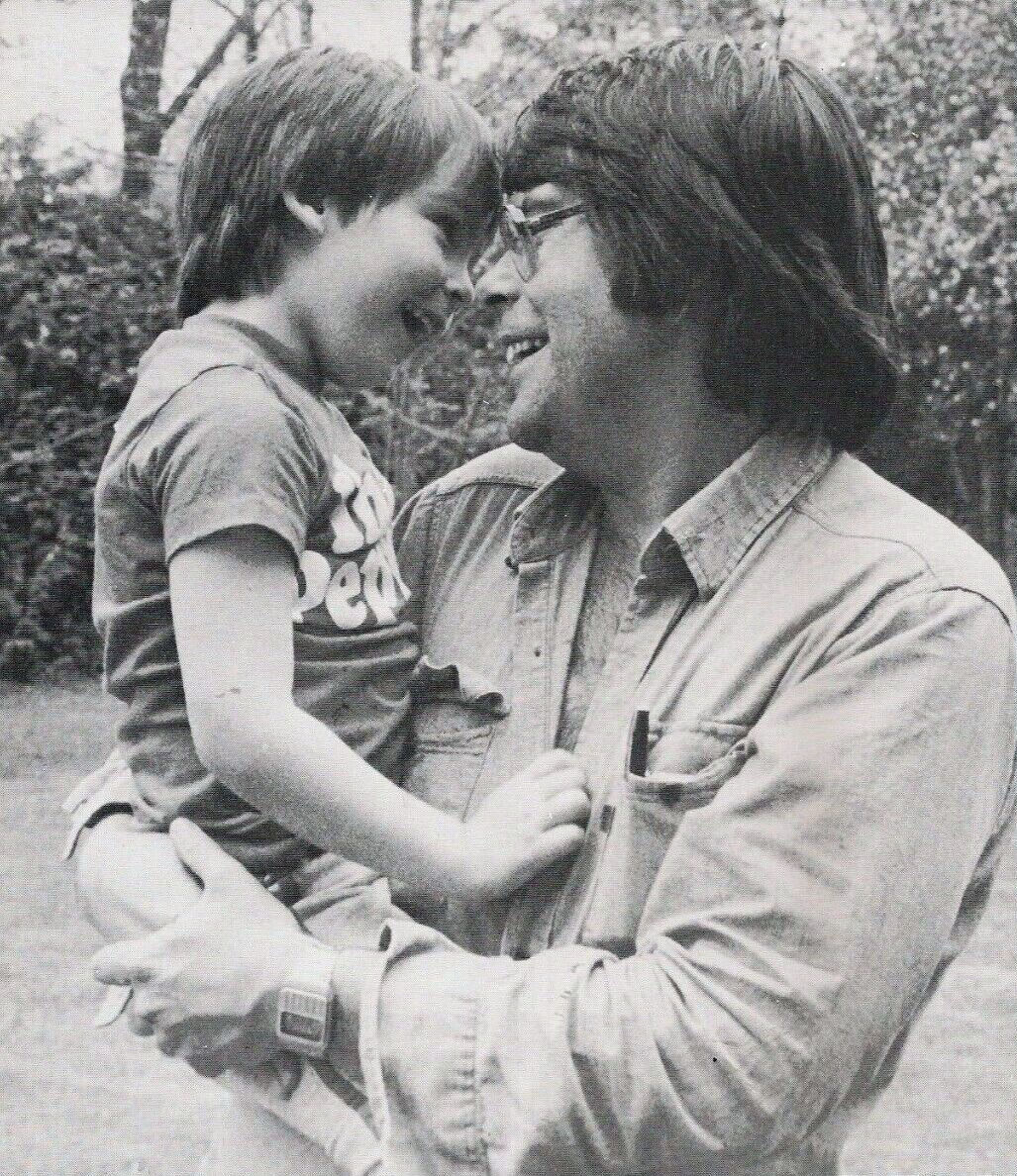
Portrait of Owen and Stephen from the first edition of Different Seasons (1982)

King was born in 1977 in Maine to parents Tabitha and Stephen King. He has two older siblings, Naomi King and Joseph Hillström King. He was raised in Bangor, Maine, showing an interest in writing during high school. King attended Vassar College and Columbia University, where he earned a Master of Fine Arts degree.

== Career ==
King published his first book, We're All in This Together, a collection of three short stories and a novella, in 2005. His short fiction has been published in various journals, such as One Story and Prairie Schooner. His debut novel, Double Feature, was published in 2013.

Sleeping Beauties, a writing collaboration between Owen King and his father, Stephen King, was published in September 2017 and is set in a women's prison in West Virginia. King is working with filmmaker Josh Boone on adapting the Clive Barker novel The Great and Secret Show for television.

In 2020, he co-wrote and produced the CBS All Access Mini-series adaption of his father's novel The Stand.

In 2023, Scribner published The Curator, King's second solo novel.

In June 2024, Syzygy Publishing, an imprint of Image Comics, began publishing the first five issues of Self Help, a serial comic book co-written by Owen King and Jesse Kellerman. A graphic novel collecting issues 1-5 was published by Simon & Schuster in February 2025.

== Initial reception of works ==
The reception for King's collection We're All in This Together was positive, with both the Los Angeles Times and The Independent giving it positive reviews.

King's first full-length novel, Double Feature, was called "overwritten" in a review in The New York Times.

King's graphic novel Intro to Alien Invasion reception was mixed, with Publishers Weekly opining that the comic was unable to consistently transcend its "B movie source material," while Booklist called the spoofing of B-list material "highly successful".

In the New York Times, Dexter Palmer's review of The Curator concluded, "This novel is richly imagined, its surface pleasures deliberately subverted by the bleak suggestion at its core: that a successful organized attempt to reduce inequity will have to overcome not just the inertia of a nation’s politics, but human nature."

== Personal life ==
King is married to writer Kelly Braffet (born 1976) and lives in New Paltz, New York.

== Awards ==
- John Gardner Award
- Fink Award

== Bibliography ==
=== Literary ===
Collections and novels

- We're All in This Together: A Novella and Stories (July 5, 2005)
  - "We're All in This Together"
  - "Frozen Animals"
  - "Wonders"
  - "Snake"
  - "My Second Wife"
- Double Feature (March 19, 2013)
- Sleeping Beauties (September 22, 2017), co-written with Stephen King
- The Curator (March 7, 2023)

Short stories

- "My Second Wife" (2001), The Bellingham Review #48, Spring 2001
- "Wonders" (2002), Book Magazine #22, May/June 2002
- "Frozen Animals" (2003), Harper Palate, Vol. 3 #1, Summer 2003
- "The Cure" (2006), One Story #85, December 20, 2006
- "Nothing is in Bad Taste" (2008), Subtropics #5, Winter/Spring 2008
- "Home Brew" (2011), Prairie Schooner, Vol. 85 #2, Summer 2011
- "The Idiot's Ghost" (2011), The Fairy Tale Review #7, The Brown Issue
- "The Curator" (2014), Lady Churchill's Rosebud Wristlet #31, Dec. 2014
- "Confederate Wall" (2015), Subtropics Issue 19, Spring/Summer 2015
- "Positive Comments" (2018), Ploughshares/Emerson College, Kindle Single

Graphic novels

- Intro to Alien Invasion (September 15, 2015), co-written with Mark Jude Poirier, drawings by Nancy Ahn
- Sleeping Beauties (February 2020), co-written with Stephen King, adapted by Rio Youers, illustrations by Alison Sampson

Anthology contributions

- Bottom of the Ninth: Great Contemporary Baseball Stories edited by John McNally (Southern Illinois University Press, 2003)
  - "Wonders"
- When I Was A Loser edited by John McNally (Free Press, 2007)
  - "Sports"
- HANG THE DJ: An Alternative Book of Music Lists edited by Angus Cargill (Faber & Faber, 2008)
  - "Spit it Out! The Top Ten Stutter Songs"
- The Late American Novel: Writers On The Future Of Books edited by Jeff Martin & C. Max Magee (Soft Skull, 2011)
  - "Not Quite as Dire as Having Your Spine Ripped Out, But…"
- Never Can Say Goodbye: Writers on their Unshakeable Love for New York edited by Sari Botton (Touchstone, 2014)
  - "Hot Time in the Old Town"
- The Good Book: Writers Reflect on Favorite Bible Passages edited by Andrew Blauner (Simon & Schuster, November 10, 2015)
  - "Never Quite As Simple: On Luke 2:19"
- Detours edited by Brian James Freeman (Cemetery Dance Publications, December 31, 2015)
  - "The Curator"
- Small Blows Against Encroaching Totalitarianism (McSweeney's Publishing, September 4, 2018)
  - "The Idea of Reasonable Debate"
- The Darkling Halls of Ivy edited by Lawrence Block (Subterranean Press, May 2020)
  - "That Golden Way"
- Minor Characters edited by Jamie Clarke (Roundabout Press, April 15, 2021)
  - "Rabbit"
- Joe R. Lansdale's The Drive-In: Multiplex Edited by Christopher Golden and Brian Keene (Thunderstorm Books, Fall 2023)
  - "Behind Screen 4"

Introductions/Afterwords

- 25 Years in the Word Mines: The Best of Graham Joyce by Graham Joyce (PS Publishing, September 2014)
  - Foreword by Owen King
- The Great and Secret Show by Clive Barker (Gauntlet Press, 2016)
  - Introduction by Owen King
- The Devil's Own Work by Alan Judd (Valancourt Books, January 6, 2015)
  - Introduction by Owen King
- Westlake Soul by Rio Youers (Short, Scary Tales Publications, October 2020)
  - Introduction by Owen King
- The World Lansdalean: The authorized Joe R. Lansdale Bibliography by Joe Lansdale (Short, Scary Tales Publications, 2021)
  - Foreword by Owen King

=== Web articles ===
- "Singing Along To A Murderous Threat, NPR song of the day: "You Rascal You" by Hanni El Khatib" (December 15, 2011)
- "A Gallery of Drama, NPR song of the day: "Change the Sheets" by Kathleen Edwards" (2/3/2012)
- "Tear For Tear, Without Peer, NPR song of the day: "Look the Other Way" by Justin Townes Earle" (April 17, 2012)
- "Interview with Tom Bissell" (April 17, 2012) The Rumpus
- "The Biggest Thing Ever, an excerpt from Double Feature" (12/3/2012) Guernica
- "Interview with Erin McKeown" (February 15, 2013) The Rumpus
- "Book Notes: Double Feature" (March 19, 2013) Largehearted Boy
- "Role Remix: Steve Buscemi" (March 19, 2013) Grantland
- "(Title, If Any)" (4/1/2013) The Weeklings
- "Best Guess: Owen King interprets the Exhibit Song Book, an exchange with singer/songwriter Jenny Owen Youngs" (7/11/2013)
- "Interview with Peter Squires" (July 25, 2013) The Rumpus
- "Matters of Faint Import, Vol. 1: "The Dress Code of Mumford & Sons" (September 24, 2013) The Weeklings

(w/James Jackson Toth, Elizabeth Nelson Bracy, and Timothy Bracy)

- "Review of People Park by Pasha Malla" (11/4/2013) Publishers Weekly
- "Matters of Faint Import, Vol. 2: "Holiday Special" (December 24, 2013) The Weeklings

(w/James Jackson Toth, Elizabeth Nelson Bracy, and Timothy Bracy)

- "The Heiress, Review of Havisham by Ronald Frame" (January 1, 2014) Los Angeles Review of Books
- "Director's Cut, Review of Mount Terminus by David Grand" (April 27, 2014) The New York Times Book Review
- "Nine Librarian-Approved Headlines For The Rest Of The Season" (July 18, 2014) Just A Bit Outside
- "Baseball's Greatest Hit" (July 29, 2014) Just A Bit Outside
- "Spinners 5, Gades 0" (9/4/2014) Just A Bit Outside
- "No, Pitchers Don't Have To Look Like Pitchers" (4/7/2015) Just A Bit Outside
- "JABO Book Club: Alison Gordon's Foul Balls, A Conversation with Rob Neyer" (5/8/2015) Just A Bit Outside
- "Baseball Language and The Players" (May 26, 2015) Just A Bit Outside
- "Big Brother: A Conversation with Andrew Ervin" (6/3/2015) The Brooklyn Rail

=== Editor ===
- Who Can Save Us Now?: Brand-New Superheroes and Their Amazing (Short) Stories (July 15, 2008)
  - "The Meerkat"

== Film and television producer ==
- The Stand (2020 TV series), writer and producer
- Let Me Go (The Right Way) (2022 short film), writer

== See also ==
- "For Owen"
