= Bird (Lisbeth Scott album) =

Studio album by Lisbeth Scott
- Released: 24 March 2015
- Label: Valley Entertainment

Lisbeth Scott chronology
Om Sweet Om	Bird

Bird is the 2015 album by singer-songwriter Lisbeth Scott. The album includes three new recordings of songs that had been previously used in films: "Good To Me" (Shutter), "Wonderful Life" (The Big Wedding), and "Just Like Rain" (The Boy Next Door).

== Track listing ==
No.	Title	Writer(s)	Length
1.	"Beautiful Disaster"	Lisbeth Scott	4:17
2.	"Good To Me"	Nathan Barr, Lisbeth Scott	3:20
3.	"One Last Time"	Lisbeth Scott	4:11
4.	"Just Like Rain"	Lisbeth Scott	3:29
5.	"Let It All Go"	Lisbeth Scott	4:06
6.	"So In Love"	Lisbeth Scott	4:07
7.	"Spare Me"	Christine McVie	4:04
8.	"Wonderful Life"	Nathan Barr, Lisbeth Scott	3:43
9.	"Still Feel Fine (featuring Abra Moore)"	Lisbeth Scott	4:29
10.	"Familiar Ground"	Lisbeth Scott	5:58
11.	"Hallelujah"	Leonard Cohen	4:07

== Credits ==
Musicians

- Lisbeth Scott - vocals, guitar, piano, bass, percussion, ukulele
- Nathan Barr - guitars on track 2, 11; mandolin on track 7
- Butch Norton - drums on tracks 1, 3, 5, 6
- Greg Leisz - pedal steel on tracks 1, 3
- Dan Lutz - bass on tracks 1–3, 5, 6
- Phil Parlapiano - mandolin on tracks 1, 3
- Quinn - drums on tracks 2, 4, 7, 11
- Tina Guo - cello on track 4
- John Huldt - guitars on tracks 5–9
- Matthias Weber - organ maestro on track 7
- Abra Moore - featured vocals on track 9
- Coyote String Quartet - strings on track 10
- Joel Douek - string arrangement on track 10
- Ian Walker - bass on track 11
- Adi Ovarsson - accordion on track 11
- Joseph Trapanese - orchestration on track 11
- Steve Erdody, Julie Gigante, Natalie Leggett, Brian Dembow - string quartet on track 11
- Adam Moseley - drum programming on track 7,9

Production

- Lisbeth Scott - producer, engineer
- Daniel Lerner - mixer on tracks 1–8, 10; engineer on tracks 2, 8, 10
- Adam Moseley - mixer on tracks 9, 11
- Jun Murakawa - engineer on tracks 1, 5, 7
- Jimmy Fahey - engineer on tracks 2, 3
- Quinn - engineer on tracks 4
- Dave Bianco - engineer on tracks 5
- Steve Lukach - engineer on tracks 7
- Nathan Barr - engineer on tracks 11
