= The Parting Glass (film) =

2018 film directed by Stephen Moyer

- Film poster
- Directed by: Stephen Moyer
- Written by: Denis O'Hare
- Produced by: Stephen Moyer; Mark Larkin; Cerise Hallam Larkin; Denis O'Hare; Anna Paquin
- Starring: Ed Asner; Rhys Ifans; Melissa Leo; Cynthia Nixon; Denis O'Hare; Anna Paquin; Paul Gross
- Cinematography: Guy Godfree
- Edited by: Todd Sandler
- Music by: Nathan Barr
- Distributed by: Sony Pictures Home Entertainment
- Release date: June 2018 (Edinburgh)
- Running time: 95 minutes
- Countries: United States; Canada
- Language: English

The Parting Glass is a 2018 American-Canadian drama film written by Denis O'Hare, directed by Stephen Moyer and starring Ed Asner, Rhys Ifans, Melissa Leo, Cynthia Nixon, Anna Paquin and O'Hare. It is Moyer's feature directorial debut.

== Premise ==
After the mysterious death of Colleen, the youngest sister, her estranged family comes together to sort through her belongings.

== Cast ==
- Melissa Leo as Al
- Cynthia Nixon as Mare
- Denis O'Hare as Danny
- Ed Asner as Tommy
- Rhys Ifans as Karl
- Anna Paquin as Colleen
- Oluniké Adeliyi as Sue
- Paul Gross as Sean

== Release ==
The film premiered at the Edinburgh International Film Festival in June 2018. The film was then released by Sony Pictures Home Entertainment on digital platforms on September 10, 2019.

== Reception ==
On the review aggregator website Rotten Tomatoes, 100% of 7 critics' reviews are positive.

On Variety, Guy Lodge wrote that "it's the kind of film that unfolds with the warm, deliberate intimacy of a good play." Writing for The Hollywood Reporter, Stephen Farber described the film as "a tender, searing story of death and dying."

In her review for Screen International, Wendy Ide wrote: "The stingingly perceptive screenplay is particularly strong on capturing the banal details which become invested with meaning following the death of a loved one."

== See also ==
- List of drama films of the 2010s
- List of Canadian films of 2018
- List of American films of 2018
- List of directorial debuts
