= Lisbeth Scott =

- Born: January 1, 1978 (age 48); Boston, Massachusetts
- Occupations: Composer, singer, songwriter
- Years active: 1994–present
- Website: www.lisbethscott.com

Lisbeth Scott (born January 1, 1978) is an American composer, vocalist, multi-instrumentalist, producer and songwriter of Armenian origin, born in Boston, Massachusetts. She is featured on the soundtracks for the films Avatar, Avatar: The Way of Water, Concussion, Shrek, The Passion Of The Christ, Transformers, The Big Wedding (co-wrote "Wonderful Life" with Nathan Barr), The Chronicles of Narnia: The Lion, the Witch, and the Wardrobe, The Chronicles of Narnia: Prince Caspian and Munich, in which she sings a 3 minute solo specifically written for her by John Williams. In addition she is featured in Iron Man 2, Disney's Wings of Life, Spider-Man and many more. She co-wrote and performed the songs "Where", and "One Breath" for Narnia. She also co-wrote and performed "Good To Me" in the movie Shutter, "Edge of Heaven" with Joel Douek for the film The Wildest Dream, "Real Love" (for Macy Grey) for the film Domino (with Harry Gregson Williams) and countless others. Her songs and vocals have been featured in hundreds of Hollywood blockbusters, many of them Oscar and Grammy winners and nominees. As a composer she has scored both television and film.

== Career ==
Scott has scored numerous feature films including the Universal feature All My Life. She also wrote, produced and performed the end credit song for the film titled Just for You and I, as well as produced "Hit Me With Your Best Shot" for the film which was performed by Keala Settle. Scott recently scored, with Nathan Barr, a new Stephen King feature, "Salem's Lot", for Warner Brothers/New Line and is currently scoring the NBC feature Documentary about the life and works of Shere Hite. She scored the 2022 Louie Schwartzberg film "Gratitude Revealed" for which she was nominated by the HMMA for best score. In 2020 she scored the Universal silent film restoration Stella Maris. In addition, Scott scored the Netflix films American Son and Justine, as well as the Moving Art episodes Machu Picchu and Oceans for Louie Schwartzberg. Lisbeth scored the feature films Caroline and Jackie and Shouting Secrets (co-composed with Matthias Weber). After co-composing the first two seasons with Nathan Barr, Scott solo composed and performed the music for Seasons 3 and 4 of Amazon's top children's show Tumble Leaf, for which she was nominated for two Annie Awards. The films I Am Somebody's Child, Dry, The Fallen Tree and the documentary Lady Ganga: Nilza's Story, also feature her scores.

For Mel Gibson's 2004 film The Passion of the Christ, she contributed to John Debney's score by writing and singing lyrics in Aramaic, based on Psalms and other biblical material.

In addition to this, Scott also provided the vocals for the ending theme of Metal Gear Solid 4: Guns of the Patriots, "Here's To You", which is a cover of the song of the same name that appeared in the 1971 film Sacco e Vanzetti. She is also featured on the games Journey which was nominated for a Grammy, and "Lair".

Scott is featured vocalist on the main titles of both Halo and The Expanse and others.

She has collaborated with John Williams, Danny Elfman, John Debney, Hans Zimmer, Harry Gregson-Williams, Brian Tyler, James Horner, Nathan Barr, Simon Franglen, Yoav Goren for GLOBUS, Rob Duncan, Snuffy Walden, Yoko Shimomura, Kaoru Wada, and Paul Schwartz and has been a featured vocalist on four of Schwartz's releases which spent 10 weeks in Billboard's top ten.

She also co-wrote and performed a song used in HBO's True Blood entitled "Take Me Home" featuring composer Nathan Barr on cello. She was frequently a featured vocalist on the series. In addition she wrote lyrics for Iron Man 2, scored by John Debney.

Lisbeth is one of several featured lead vocalists on four Globus albums; Epicon, Break From This World, Cinematica and Every End a Whispered Start. She is also featured vocalist on John Debney's movement "Love" from the recently completed, interfaith project by Ihab Darwish, The Abrahamic Symphony.

In 2014 Scott was featured on the compilation Songs from a Stolen Spring that paired Western musicians with artists from the Arab Spring. On the album Scott performed the Jimmy Cliff song "Many Rivers to Cross" that was meshed with "Once Upon a Time" by the Tunisian musician Lobna Noomene.

Scott has released 12 solo albums and is featured on countless soundtracks. Calm and Comfort, her newest release featuring the playing of the all female string group Orchid Quartet, was released in 2022 on Hearts of Space Records.

== Discography ==
- Sirens (Zone Records, 1994)
- Climb (Zone Records, 1997)
- Dove (2002)
- Fair Skye (2003)
- Passionate Voice (2004)
- Munich (2005)
- Charmed (AIX DVD-Audio/Video, 2005)
- Rough and Steep (2006)
- Globus - Epicon (2006)
- The Ten Thousand Steps (Biomusique, 2008)
- Hope Is a Thing (2009)
- Globus - Break from this World (2011)
- Om Sweet Om (Hearts of Space Records, 2011)
- The Long Road Down (Song from the Miniseries Hatfields & McCoys) (Valley Entertainment, 2012)
- Journey (Sony Computer Entertainment America, 2012)
- Songs from a Stolen Spring (Valley Entertainment/Kirkelig Kulturverksted, 2014)
- Om Sweet Om (Valley Entertainment, 2014)
- Bird (Valley Entertainment, 2015)
- Eternal Om (Hearts of Space Records, 2016)
- Calm and Comfort (Hearts of Space, 2022)

== Filmography ==
1997

- The Peacemaker (Music by Hans Zimmer)

1998

- Sleepy Hollow (Music by Danny Elfman)

1999

- Blast from the Past (Music by Steve Dorff)

1999

- The Sixth Sense (Music by James Newton Howard)**

2000

- Dinosaur (Music by James Newton Howard)

2001

- Atlantis: The Lost Empire (Music by James Newton Howard)
- Spy Game (Music by Harry Gregson-Williams)

2002

- The Scorpion King (Music by John Debney)
- Agent Cody Banks (Music by John Powell)
- Spider-Man (Music by Danny Elfman)

2003

- The Last Samurai (Music by Hans Zimmer)**
- Sinbad: Legend of the Seven Seas (Music by Harry Gregson-Williams)
- Bruce Almighty (Music by John Debney)

2004

- The Passion of the Christ (Music by John Debney)*
- Shrek 2 (Music by Harry Gregson-Williams)
- Christmas with the Kranks (Music by John Debney)
- King Arthur (Music by Hans Zimmer)

2005

- Kingdom of Heaven (Music by Harry Gregson-Williams)**
- Domino (Music by Harry Gregson-Williams)
- King Kong (Music by James Newton Howard)**
- The Chronicles of Narnia: The Lion, the Witch and the Wardrobe (Music by Harry Gregson-Williams)**
- Munich (Music by John Williams)**
- Star Wars: Episode III – Revenge of the Sith (Music by John Williams)
- Lair (Music by John Debney)

2006

- Blood Diamond (Music by James Newton Howard)
- Déjà Vu (Music by Harry Gregson-Williams)
- Canvas (Music by Joel Goodman)

2007

- Gone Baby Gone (Music by Harry Gregson-Williams)
- Shrek the Third (Music by Harry Gregson-Williams)
- Evan Almighty (Music by John Debney)
- Captain Abu Raed (Music by Austin Wintory)

2008

- Metal Gear Solid 4: Guns of the Patriots (Music by Harry Gregson-Williams, Ennio Morricone)
- 24: Redemption (Music by Sean Callery)
- The Chronicles of Narnia: Prince Caspian (Music by Harry Gregson-Williams)
- Indiana Jones and the Kingdom of the Crystal Skull (Music by John Williams)
- Tropic Thunder (Music by Theodore Shapiro)
- The Mummy: Tomb of the Dragon Emperor (Music by Randy Edelman and John Debney)

2009

- Avatar (Music by James Horner)
- Breaking Point (Music by Pinar Toprak)
- Transformers: Revenge of the Fallen (Music by Steve Jablonsky)
- X-Men Origins: Wolverine (Music by Harry Gregson-Williams)

2010

- The Chronicles of Narnia: The Voyage of the Dawn Treader (Music by David Arnold. Themes by Harry Gregson-Williams)
- Prince of Persia: The Sands of Time (Music by Harry Gregson-Williams)
- Iron Man 2 (Music by John Debney)
- To Rest in Peace (Music by Leah Curtis)
- Lahore (Music by Wayne Sharpe)
- The Wildest Dream (Music by Joel Douek)

2011

- Battle: Los Angeles (Music by Brian Tyler)
- Your Highness (Music by Steve Jablonsky)
- Transformers: Dark of the Moon (Music by Steve Jablonsky)
- Cowboys & Aliens (Music by Harry Gregson-Williams)
- The Ledge (Music by Nathan Barr)

2012

- Journey (Music by Austin Wintory)**
- Exitus Roma (Music by Leah Curtis)
- Mass Effect 3 (Music by Sam Hulick)
- Hatfields & McCoys (TV miniseries) (Music by John Debney)
- High Vibrations Yoga: Inner Peace and Outer Strength

2013

- The Big Wedding (Music by Nathan Barr, song Nathan Barr/Lisbeth Scott)
- Broken Horses (Music by John Debney)
- Population Boom (Music by Karwan Marouf, song Karwan Marouf/Lisbeth Scott)

2015

- The Boy Next Door directed by Rob Cohen (Music by Randy Edelman and Nathan Barr)

2016

- The Americans (Music by Nathan Barr)

2017

- Carnival Row (Music by Nathan Barr)

2018

- The Great (Music by Nathan Barr)

2020

- All My Life (Music by Lisbeth Scott)

2022

- Avatar: The Way of Water Directed by James Cameron (music by Simon Franglen)
- Gratitude Revealed (Music by Lisbeth Scott)

2024

- 'Salem's Lot (Music by Nathan Barr and Lisbeth Scott)

*Academy Award Nomination
**Grammy Award Nomination
