= Nathan Barr =

American film and television composer and musician

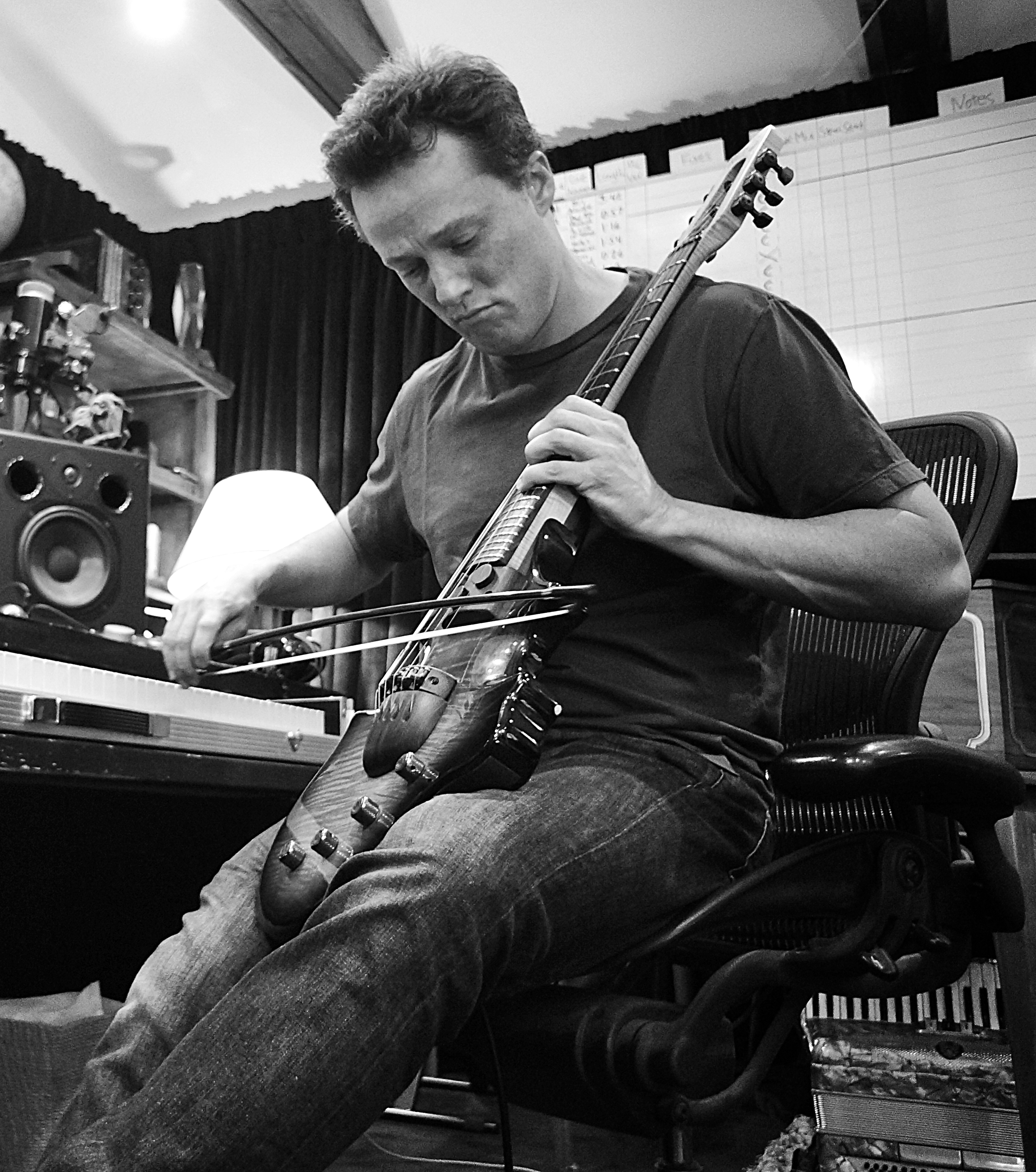
- Nathan Barr playing his bowed guitar
- Born: Nathan W. Barr; February 9, 1973 (age 53); New York City, New York, U.S.
- Other name: Nate Barr
- Occupation: Composer

Nathan W. Barr (born February 9, 1973; also known as Nate Barr) is an American film and television composer and musician. His television scores include True Blood, The Americans, Carnival Row, and The Great. He won a Primetime Emmy Award for Outstanding Main Title Theme Music in 2020 for his work on the miniseries Hollywood.

== Early life ==
Barr started studying music in Tokyo, Japan at the age of four. He studied cello and English literature at Skidmore College.

== Career ==
In 1996, Barr moved to Los Angeles to pursue a career in composing film and television scores. One of his first jobs was working under the tutelage of Hans Zimmer on the films As Good as It Gets and The Prince of Egypt. After 8 months with Zimmer, Barr landed an agent and branched out on his own. Since then, Barr has scored a large array of feature films and TV series, including all episodes of HBO's series True Blood.

In 2009, Barr co-wrote and produced a song with Pete Townshend for FX's The Americans called "It Must Be Done" and in 2005 Barr hired Billy Gibbons from ZZ Top to play guitar on his score for The Dukes Of Hazzard.

== Filmography ==
=== Film ===
| Year | Title | Director | Notes |
|---|---|---|---|
| 1998 | Hairshirt | Dean Paras | —N/a |
| 1998 | Traveling Companion | Paula Goldberg | Short film |
| 1999 | Beyond the Mat | Barry W. Blaustein | Documentary film |
| 1999 | From Dusk Till Dawn 3: The Hangman's Daughter | P. J. Pesce | Direct-to-video film |
| 2000 | The Virginian | Bill Pullman | Television film |
| 2000 | Red Dirt | Tag Purvis | Television film |
| 2001 | Venus and Mars | Harry Mastrogeorge | —N/a |
| 2001 | Going Greek | Justin Zackham | —N/a |
| 2001 | Big Time | Jerry Heiss | —N/a |
| 2002 | Cabin Fever | Eli Roth | —N/a |
| 2003 | Briar Patch | Zev Berman | —N/a |
| 2005 | 2001 Maniacs | Tim Sullivan | —N/a |
| 2005 | The Dukes of Hazzard | Jay Chandrasekhar | —N/a |
| 2005 | Hostel | Eli Roth | —N/a |
| 2007 | Grindhouse | Eli Roth | Thanksgiving segment |
| 2007 | Rise: Blood Hunter | Sebastian Gutierrez | —N/a |
| 2007 | Watching the Detectives | Paul Soter | —N/a |
| 2007 | Hostel: Part II | Eli Roth | —N/a |
| 2008 | Shutter | Masayuki Ochiai | —N/a |
| 2008 | Lost Boys: The Tribe | P. J. Pesce | —N/a |
| 2009 | The Slammin' Salmon | Kevin Heffernan | —N/a |
| 2010 | Open House | Andrew Paquin | —N/a |
| 2010 | The Last Exorcism | Daniel Stamm | —N/a |
| 2011 | The Ledge | Matthew Chapman | —N/a |
| 2013 | The Big Wedding | Justin Zackham | —N/a |
| 2015 | The Boy Next Door | Rob Cohen | Composed with Randy Edelman featuring vocal by Lisbeth Scott |
| 2015 | Hollywood Adventures | Timothy Kendall | —N/a |
| 2017 | Flatliners | Niels Arden Oplev | —N/a |
| 2018 | The Domestics | Mike P. Nelson | Additional Music by Stephen Lukach |
| 2018 | The House with a Clock in Its Walls | Eli Roth | —N/a |
| 2018 | The Parting Glass | Stephen Moyer | —N/a |
| 2020 | The Turning | Floria Sigismondi | Additional Music by Justin Caine Burnett |
| 2020 | The Hunt | Craig Zobel | Additional Music By Justin Caine Burnett & Stephen Lukach |
| 2020 | Uncle Frank | Alan Ball | —N/a |
| 2021 | Kate | Cedric Nicolas-Troyan | —N/a |
| 2022 | Prey for the Devil | Daniel Stamm | —N/a |
| 2023 | The Beanie Bubble | Kristin Gore; Damian Kulash | Composed with Damian Kulash |
| 2024 | A Bit of Light | Stephen Moyer | |
| 2024 | 'Salem's Lot | Gary Dauberman | Composed with Lisbeth Scott |

=== Television series ===
| Year | Title | Notes |
|---|---|---|
| 2000 | Fear | —N/a |
| 2001 | Kate Brasher | —N/a |
| 2008–14 | True Blood | —N/a |
| 2013–15 | Hemlock Grove | Composed with Todd Haberman |
| 2013–18 | The Americans | —N/a |
| 2014 | Tumble Leaf | —N/a |
| 2015–17 | Sneaky Pete | Composed with Stephen Lukach |
| 2016 | Greenleaf | —N/a |
| 2017 | The Son | —N/a |
| 2019 | Fosse/Verdon | —N/a |
| 2019 | The Rook | Additional music by Justin Caine Burnett |
| 2019 | Carnival Row | —N/a |
| 2020 | The Great | Includes Bird on a Wire by Simone Istwa |
| 2020 | Hollywood | —N/a |
| 2022–25 | The Tiny Chef Show | Theme song composer |
| 2023 | The Diplomat | Composed with Dimitri Smith |
| 2025 | The Morning Show | Season 4 |

== Awards ==
- 2010 BMI Award for Original Score for True Blood Season 2 (HBO)
- 2009 Hollywood Media in Music Award for Best Score for True Blood (HBO)
- 2009 BMI Award for Original Score for True Blood (HBO)
- 2006 BMI Award for Music for Film: The Dukes of Hazzard

| Year | Award | Category | Nominee(s) | Result | Ref. |
|---|---|---|---|---|---|
| 2013 | Primetime Emmy Award | Outstanding Original Main Title Theme Music | The Americans | Nominated | |
| 2013 | Primetime Emmy Award | Outstanding Original Main Title Theme Music | Hemlock Grove | Nominated | |
| 2020 | Primetime Emmy Award | Outstanding Original Main Title Theme Music | Carnival Row | Nominated | |
| 2020 | Primetime Emmy Award | Outstanding Original Main Title Theme Music | Hollywood | Won | |
| 2020 | Primetime Emmy Award | Outstanding Music Composition for a Limited Series, Movie, or Special | Hollywood | Nominated | |
| 2022 | Primetime Emmy Award | Outstanding Music Composition for a Limited Series, Movie, or Special | A Very British Scandal: Episode 1 | Nominated | |
