= Leah Curtis =

Musician and composer

Leah Curtis is a Los Angeles-based Australian composer whose work centres on contemporary classical music, with a focus on orchestral composition and commissioned works. Alongside her classical composition practice, she is in demand as a composer, arranger and orchestrator for international cinema and fine art installations.

== Awards ==
Curtis has been the recipient of a number of awards include the Queen Elizabeth II Trust, the Dame Joan Sutherland Award, the Reg Waite Award, Young Shakespearean Artist of the Year, two Hollywood Music in Media Awards with multiple nominations and a Fulbright. She is a recipient of Reel Change from New Music USA.

=== APRA-AGSC Screen Music Awards ===
These awards are presented annually since 2002 by the Australasian Performing Right Association (APRA) and the Australian Guild of Screen Composers (AGSC).

Year	Nominee / work	Award	Result
2012	Animula Vagula from Exitus Roma Featuring Lisbeth Scott	Best Original Song Composed for the Screen	Nominated

=== Hollywood Music in Media Awards ===
The Hollywood Music in Media Awards are presented annually.

Year	Nominee / work	Award	Result
2014	No Ticket to Travel for Woodland	Best Original Song/Score for a Commercial Advertisement	Nominated
2013	Moving Water from Empyrean	Best Original Score (Indie / Short / Documentary)	Nominated
2012	Animula Vagula from Exitus Roma Featuring Lisbeth Scott	Best World Song	Won
2012	Animula Vagula from Exitus Roma Featuring Lisbeth Scott	Best Original Song (Indie / Short / Documentary)	Nominated
2010	Salamun Salam (Peace of Peace) Featuring Lisbeth Scott	Best World Song	Won
2010	To Rest in Peace	Best Original Score (Indie / Short / Documentary)	Nominated
2009	Australia Suite	Best Orchestral / Classical Work	Nominated

=== The Park City Film Music Festival ===
The first U.S. (American) film festival dedicated to the impact of music in film, held annually in Park City, Utah.

Year	Nominee / work	Award	Result
2012	To Rest in Peace	Best Impact of Music in a Short Film 3rd Place	Won
