= Second Act (film) =

2018 film by Peter Segal

- Theatrical release poster
- Directed by: Peter Segal
- Written by: Justin Zackham; Elaine Goldsmith-Thomas
- Produced by: Jennifer Lopez; Elaine Goldsmith-Thomas; Justin Zackham; Benny Medina
- Starring: Jennifer Lopez; Leah Remini; Vanessa Hudgens; Treat Williams; Milo Ventimiglia
- Cinematography: Ueli Steiger
- Edited by: Jason Gourson
- Music by: Michael Andrews
- Production companies: STXfilms; H. Brothers; TMP; Nuyorican Productions
- Distributed by: STXfilms
- Release date: December 21, 2018 (United States)
- Running time: 104 minutes
- Country: United States
- Language: English
- Budget: $16 million
- Box office: $72.3 million

Second Act is a 2018 American romantic comedy film directed by Peter Segal and written by Elaine Goldsmith-Thomas and Justin Zackham. It stars Jennifer Lopez, Leah Remini, Vanessa Hudgens, Treat Williams and Milo Ventimiglia.

The plot follows a woman in her forties who successfully pursues a second chance at a corporate career, after a friend's son creates a fake résumé and credentials for her.

The film received mixed reviews from critics, with praise of Lopez's performance but criticism of the story and the script, and grossed over US$72 million worldwide.

== Plot ==
Maya Vargas is the assistant manager of the Queens Value Shop store, where she has worked for the past 15 years. During that time she has dramatically improved sales, customer relations, and general store culture through her intuitive and innovative methods. She awaits a store visit by an executive of her company, Mr. Weiskopf, anxiously hoping to be promoted to manager.

Maya's boyfriend Trey, co-workers, and several regular customers all assure Maya that she is guaranteed the promotion. However, she is passed up in favor of Arthur, a non-local company employee with an MBA from Duke.

Mr. Weiskopf explains that while he values Maya's dedication and success, as Maya only has a GED and no college degree, she is ineligible for the promotion by company policy. Her skilled computer programmer godson Dill then rebuilds her background online, unbeknownst to her, giving her a Harvard degree and world travel.

Maya is surprised to be called to interview at, then hired as a consultant by one of the supermarket's suppliers F&C, a large cosmetics company. Initially she has no idea her whole background and credentials were doctored by the youth.

When Maya shares the news with Trey, he immediately urges her to come clean about her true background. When he proposes they spend a few weeks away together to get started on creating a family, she pulls away, saying it is not the right time. Trey does not think Maya will ever decide the timing is right, so splits up with her

F&C CEO, Mr. Clarke, soon has Maya head a team developing a new, all-natural skin care product in competition with a team led by his daughter Zoe. With help from Development Executive Hildy, Maya enlists overlooked F&C employees Ariana and Chase to help come up with something in the allotted three months.

Given a fully-stocked, luxury apartment and company credit cards, Maya's friend Joan comes over. After Maya is told that Trey is getting a lot of female companionship, her friend helps outfit her with the cards.

Mr. Clare invites the two teams to his yacht club. There, as according to Maya's resumé she had been on Harvard's rowing team, Maya and Zoe each guide their own team. It comes to a sudden, disastrous end when Maya inadvertently orders her crew to turn sharply into the other boat, sinking it. This amuses the CEO.

Afterwards, Maya and Zoe get to know each other. Both of Maya's parents had died, she stayed with her grandmother until her death, then she ended up in the foster system. Zoe's mother died three years ago, but she confesses to having been adopted.

Hildy explains the product must be completely organic, profitable and fill a gap in the market. The team of three tries to do research on the street to uncover what is needed in the market. While in the lab they test many natural items to find a successful combination.

When a possible Chinese distributor is in town, Zoe asks Maya to come along as interpreter, as Mandarin fluency is on her resumé. As Joan's vet speaks it, she is able to muddle through by using an earpiece.

Just before Zoe takes Maya to her dad's to give her some notes, he gives her some news. In her bedroom, she shows her knicknacks from her childhood. Taking out the baby blanket and card with it, Maya realizes that Zoe is the biological child she gave up as a teenager because she could not cope with the challenges of parenthood.

Deciding to keep their connection secret, the teams push ahead. Maya's comes up with an all-in-one, organic, UV protection moisturizer. At the launch Maya comes clean, so passes the credit to Ariana and Chase, in the nick of time before the vengeful DE Ron can out her.

Feeling betrayed, Zoe goes to London to finish art school. Meanwhile, Maya returns to Queens and helps create an online shopping app, coded by Stanford student Dill. Trey comes back to her, and when Zoe finishes her degree and returns to NYC, they also reconcile.

== Cast ==
- Jennifer Lopez as Maya DaVilla
  - Brianda Agramonte as young Maya DaVilla / Maria Vargas
- Vanessa Hudgens as Zoe Clarke
- Leah Remini as Joan
- Treat Williams as Anderson Clarke
- Milo Ventimiglia as Trey
- Annaleigh Ashford as Hildy Ostrander
- Lo Mutuc (Note: Credited as Charlyne Yi) as Ariana Ng
- Alan Aisenberg as Chase Horowitz
- Freddie Stroma as Ron Ebsen
- Dave Foley as Felix Herman
- Larry Miller as Weiskopf
- Dierdre Friel as Big Ant
- Lacretta as Suzi Teplitsky
- Dan Bucatinsky as Arthur Coyle
- Dalton Harrod as Dilly
- John James Cronin as Otto
- Elizabeth Masucci as Claire
- Michael Boatman as Edward Taylor
- Anna Suzuki as Alicia Zhou
- Ellen Cleghorne as Shaniqua

== Production ==
In June 2017, Jennifer Lopez signed on to star. In October 2017, Leah Remini, Annaleigh Ashford, Vanessa Hudgens, Dan Bucatinsky and Freddie Stroma joined the cast of the film. In November 2017, Milo Ventimiglia, Treat Williams, Larry Miller, Dave Foley, Lo Mutac, and Alan Aisenberg were added. Lopez was also a producer.

=== Filming ===
Principal photography began on October 23, 2017 in New York City. Filming finished on December 15, 2017.

=== Music ===
On September 21, 2018, Sia was announced as the composer for the original song "Limitless" for the film's soundtrack, produced by Jesse Shatkin and performed by Lopez. On October 9, 2018, Lopez performed the song at the American Music Awards.

== Release ==
Second Act was initially scheduled to be released in the United States on November 21, 2018, but in September 2018, following "incredible" test screenings, its distributor STXfilms moved it to December 14, and then again to December 21, 2018.

The studio spent $19–30 million on promotion and advertisements for the film.

== Reception ==
=== Box office ===
Second Act grossed $39.3 million in the United States and Canada, and $33 million in other territories, for a total worldwide gross of $72.3 million, against a production budget of $16 million. In order to break-even, the film needed to gross an estimated $30–40 million.

In the United States and Canada, the film was released alongside Aquaman, Welcome to Marwen and Bumblebee, and was projected to gross $9–13 million from 2,607 theaters over its five-day opening weekend. It made $2.5 million on its first day, including $515,000 from Thursday night previews. It went on to debut at $6.5 million for the weekend, finishing seventh at the box office. It then grossed $1 million on Monday and $3 million on Christmas Day, for a five-day total gross of $10.6 million. In its second weekend, it increased by 13%, grossing $7.4 million.

=== Critical response ===
On Rotten Tomatoes, the film holds an approval rating of 44% based on 117 reviews, with an average rating of 5.1/10. The website's critical consensus reads, "Second Act proves Jennifer Lopez remains as magnetic as ever on the big screen; unfortunately, the movie's muddled story isn't always worthy of her gifts." On Metacritic, the film has a weighted average score of 46 out of 100, based on 27 critics, indicating "mixed or average reviews". Audiences polled by CinemaScore gave the film an average grade of "B+" on an A+ to F scale.

Owen Gleiberman of Variety wrote: "Even though Second Act shouldn't work, it does (sort of). It's got flow, a certain knowing ticky-tackiness about its own contrivances. You know you're watching a connect-the-dots comedy, but the dots sparkle. And Lopez gives her first star performance in a while. Age has enriched her talent; she brings curlicues of experience to every scene." Ariana Romero of Refinery29 gave the film a positive review and wrote: "All of the bumps in Maya's life are distractions from the joy of seeing Jennifer Lopez, one of our most charming celebrities, triumph, all while making us laugh and wearing impeccable clothing." Romero also praised the film's costume designers, Patricia Field and Molly Rogers. Keith Uhlich of The Hollywood Reporter wrote that "J.Lo looks movie-star fabulous in her many form-fitting dresses."

Michael Phillips of the Chicago Tribune gave the film 2 out of 4 stars, saying: "Good cast, nearly hopeless script. Second Act hinges on a significant reveal around the midpoint, and it's a lulu in the worst way—preposterously coincidental, outrageously contrived." On Roger Ebert.com, Nell Minow judged it a poor film that "tries to borrow from" Working Girl: "Even the boundless charms of Jennifer Lopez cannot overcome a mess of a script in 'Second Act,' a mishmash that has as much of an identity crisis as its name-switching, past-hiding, resume-inflating main character."

Lopez's performance in the film earned her a nomination for Best Actress at the 2019 Imagen Awards.
