= List of awards and nominations received by Anna Paquin =

Anna Paquin awards and nominations
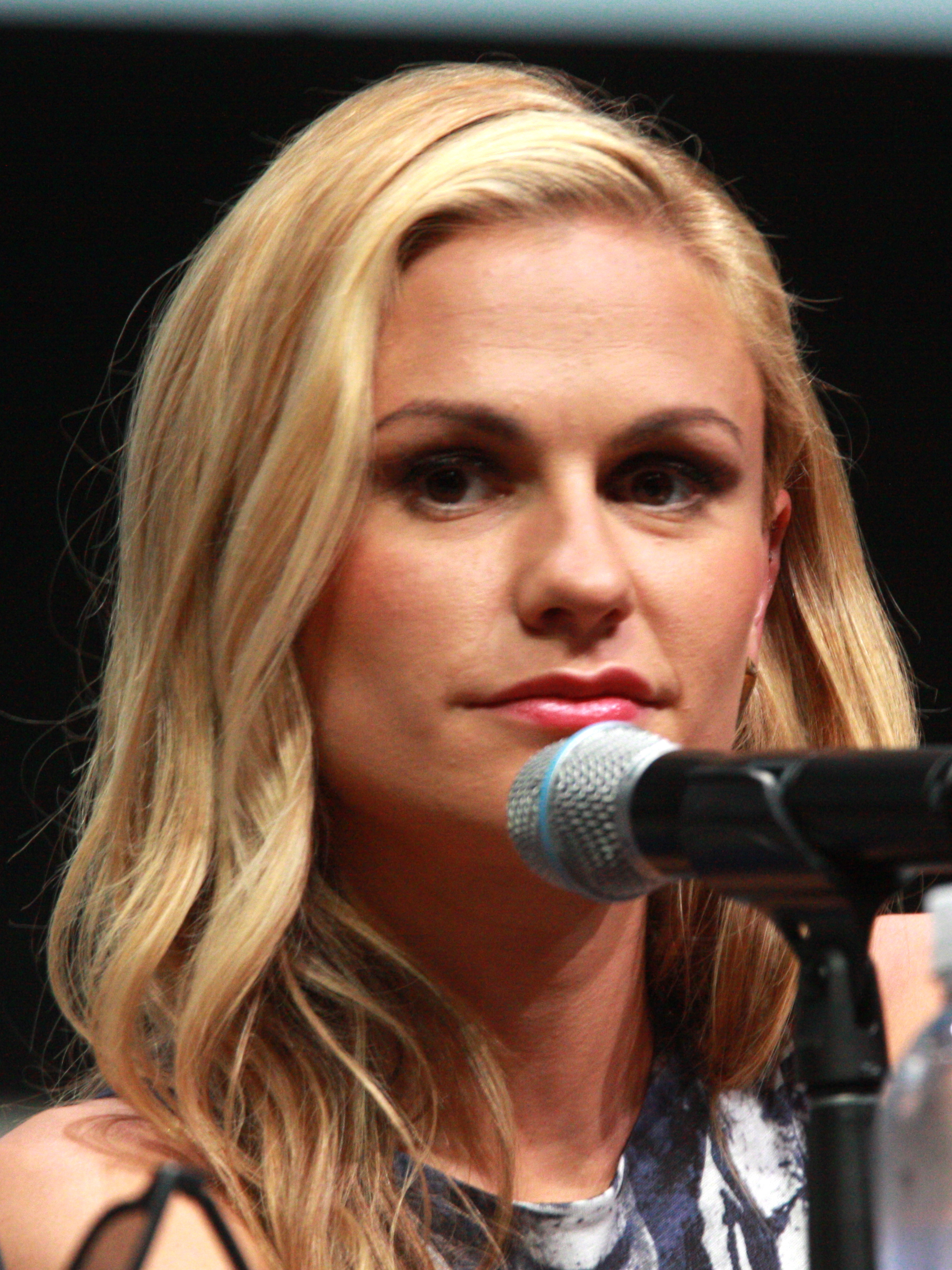
- Paquin in 2013
Awards and nominations
Award	Wins	Nominations
Academy Awards	1	1
Critics' Choice Awards	1	3
Drama Desk Award	1	1
Golden Globe Awards	1	5
Primetime Emmy Awards	0	1
Satellite Awards	2	3
Saturn Awards	0	4
Screen Actors Guild Awards	0	4

Totals (Note: Certain award groups do not simply award one winner. They acknowledge several different recipients, have runners-up, and have third place. Since this is a specific recognition and is different from losing an award, runner-up mentions are considered wins in this award tally. For simplification and to avoid errors, each award in this list has been presumed to have had a prior nomination.)
- Wins: 26
- Nominations: 62

This is a list of awards and nominations received by New Zealand-Canadian actress Anna Paquin.

== Major associations ==
=== Academy Awards ===
Year	Work(s)	Category	Result	Ref.
1994	The Piano	Best Supporting Actress	Won	

=== Primetime Emmy Awards ===
Year	Work(s)	Category	Result	Ref.
2007	Bury My Heart at Wounded Knee	Outstanding Supporting Actress in a Miniseries or a Movie	Nominated	

=== Golden Globe Awards ===
Year	Work(s)	Category	Result	Ref.
1994	The Piano	Best Supporting Actress – Motion Picture	Nominated	
2008	Bury My Heart at Wounded Knee	Best Supporting Actress – Series, Miniseries or Motion Picture Made for Television	Nominated	
2009	True Blood	Best Actress in a Television Series – Drama	Won	
2010	True Blood	Best Actress in a Television Series – Drama	Nominated	
2010	The Courageous Heart of Irena Sendler	Best Actress in a Miniseries or Motion Picture – Television	Nominated	

=== Screen Actors Guild Awards ===
Year	Work(s)	Category	Result	Ref.
2001	Almost Famous	Outstanding Performance by a Cast in a Motion Picture	Nominated	
2008	Bury My Heart at Wounded Knee	Outstanding Performance by a Female Actor in a Motion Picture Made for Television or Miniseries	Nominated	
2010	True Blood	Outstanding Performance by a Cast in a Drama Television Series	Nominated	
2020	The Irishman	Outstanding Performance by a Cast in a Motion Picture	Nominated	

== Other associations ==
=== Critics' Choice Awards ===
Year	Work(s)	Category	Result	Ref.
1998	Fly Away Home	Best Young Actress in a Movie	Nominated	
2016	Roots	Best Supporting Actress in a TV Movie/Miniseries	Nominated	
2020	The Irishman	Best Acting Ensemble in a Movie	Won	

=== Drama Desk Award ===
Year	Work(s)	Category	Result	Ref.
2005	The Distance from Here	Outstanding Ensemble	Won	

=== Gotham Awards ===
Year	Work(s)	Category	Result	Ref.
2005	The Squid and the Whale	Best Ensemble Cast	Won	

=== MTV Movie & TV Awards ===
Year	Work(s)	Category	Result	Ref.
2001	X-Men	Best On-Screen Duo	Nominated	
2004	X2	Best Kiss (with Shawn Ashmore)	Nominated	

=== People's Choice Awards ===
Year	Work(s)	Category	Result	Ref.
2010	True Blood	Favorite TV Drama Actress	Nominated	

=== Satellite Awards ===
Year	Work(s)	Category	Result	Ref.
2008	True Blood	Best Actress – Television Series Drama	Won	
2009	True Blood	Best Cast – Television Series	Won	
2010	True Blood	Best Actress – Television Series Drama	Nominated	

=== Saturn Awards ===
Year	Work(s)	Category	Result	Ref.
2001	X-Men	Best Performance by a Younger Actor	Nominated	
2009	True Blood	Best Actress on Television	Nominated	
2010	True Blood	Best Actress on Television	Nominated	
2011	True Blood	Best Actress on Television	Nominated	

=== Scream Awards ===
Year	Work(s)	Category	Result	Ref.
2009	True Blood	Best Horror Actress	Won	
2010	True Blood	Best Horror Actress	Won	
2011	True Blood	Best Horror Actress	Nominated	
2011	Scream 4	Best Cameo (with Kristen Bell)	Nominated	

=== Teen Choice Awards ===
Year	Work(s)	Category	Result	Ref.
2003	X2	Choice Movie: Chemistry (with Shawn Ashmore)	Nominated	
2009	True Blood	Choice Summer TV Star: Female	Nominated	
2010	True Blood	Choice TV Actress Fantasy/Sci-Fi	Nominated	
2010	True Blood	Choice Summer TV Star: Female	Nominated	
2011	True Blood	Choice TV Actress Fantasy/Sci-Fi	Nominated	
2012	True Blood	Choice TV Actress Fantasy/Sci-Fi	Nominated	

=== Young Artist Awards ===
Year	Work(s)	Category	Result	Ref.
1997	Fly Away Home	Best Leading Young Actress in a Feature Film	Nominated	
1998	The Member of the Wedding	Best Leading Young Actress in a TV Movie/Pilot/Mini-Series	Nominated	
2000	A Walk on the Moon	Best Supporting Young Actress in a Feature Film	Nominated	

=== YoungStar Awards ===
Year	Work(s)	Category	Result	Ref.
1997	Fly Away Home	Best Performance by a Young Actress in a Drama Film	Nominated	
1999	A Walk on the Moon	Best Performance by a Young Actress in a Drama Film	Nominated	

== Critics awards ==
Association	Year	Work(s)	Category	Result	Ref.
Austin Film Critics Association Awards	2020	The Irishman	Best Ensemble	Nominated	
Awards Circuit Community Awards	1993	The Piano	Best Actress in a Supporting Role	Won	
Awards Circuit Community Awards	2005	The Squid and the Whale	Best Cast Ensemble	Nominated	
Blockbuster Entertainment Awards	2001	X-Men	Favorite Actress — Science Fiction	Nominated	
Chicago Film Critics Association	1994	The Piano	Best Supporting Actress	Nominated	
Chicago Film Critics Association	2011	Margaret	Best Actress	Nominated	
Detroit Film Critics Society Awards	2019	The Irishman	Best Ensemble	Nominated	
Film Critics Circle of Australia	1994	The Piano	Best Supporting Actor — Female	Won	
Florida Film Critics Circle Awards	2019	The Irishman	Best Ensemble	Nominated	
Georgia Film Critics Association Awards	2019	The Irishman	Best Ensemble	Nominated	
London Film Critics' Circle	2011	Margaret	Actress of the Year	Won	
Los Angeles Film Critics Association	1993	The Piano	Best Supporting Actress	Won	
National Society of Film Critics	1994	The Piano	Best Supporting Actress	Nominated	
Online Film & Television; Association Awards	1999	Hurlyburly	Best Youth Performance	Nominated	
Online Film & Television; Association Awards	2007	Bury My Heart at Wounded Knee	Best Supporting Actress in a Motion Picture or Miniseries	Won	
Online Film & Television; Association Awards	2009	True Blood	Best Actress in a Drama Series	Nominated	
Online Film & Television; Association Awards	2009	The Courageous Heart of Irena Sendler	Best Actress in a Motion Picture or Miniseries	Nominated	
Online Film & Television; Association Awards	2010	True Blood	Best Actress in a Drama Series	Nominated	
San Diego Film Critics Society Awards	2019	The Irishman	Best Ensemble	Runner-up	
Seattle Film Critics Society Awards	2019	The Irishman	Best Ensemble	Nominated	
Village Voice Film Poll	2011	Margaret	Best Actress	Won	
Women's Image Network Awards	2013	True Blood	Actress Drama Series	Won	
Washington D.C. Area Film Critics Association Awards	2019	The Irishman	Best Ensemble	Nominated	
