= Anna Paquin =

New Zealand actress (born 1982)

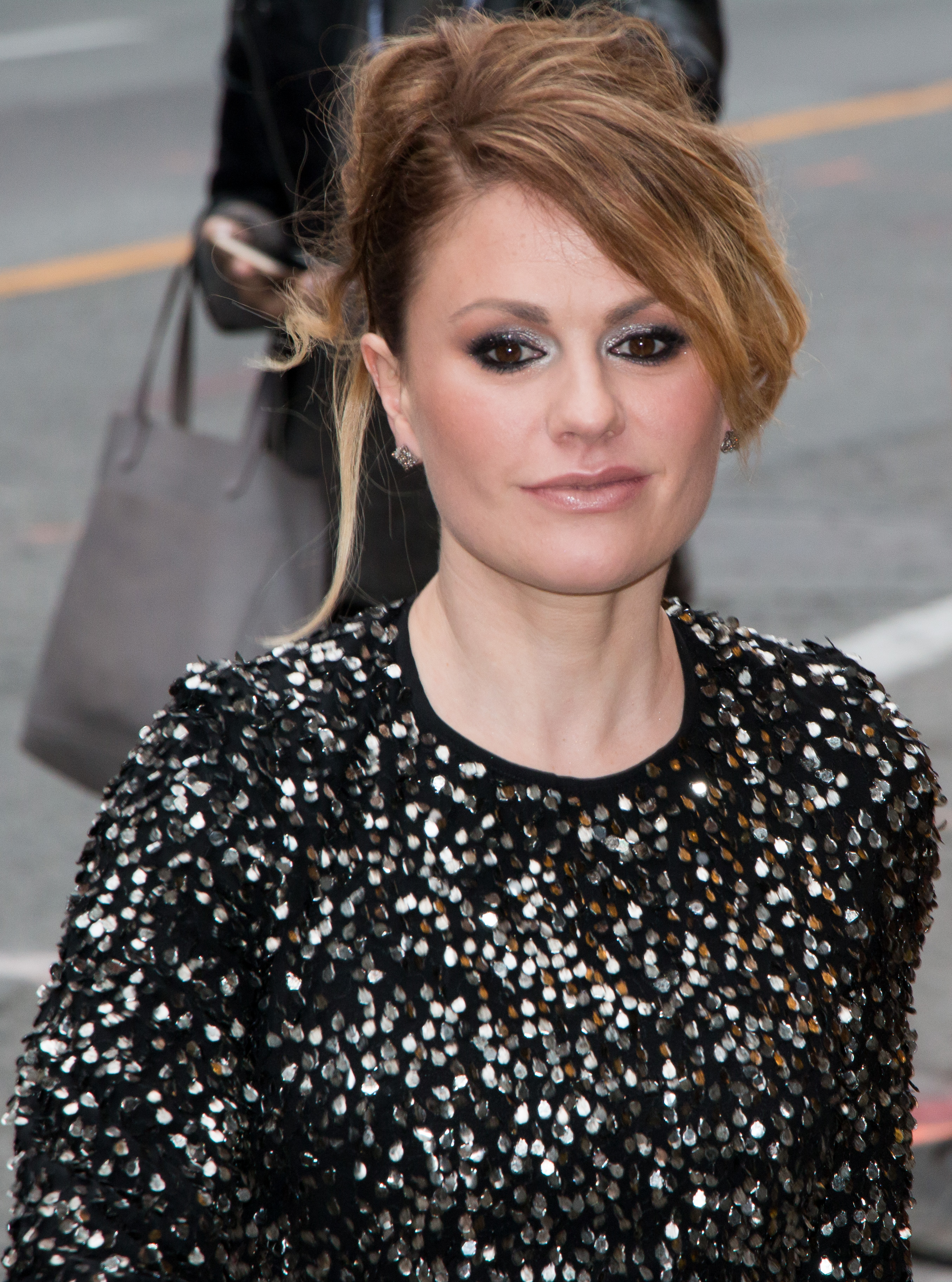
- Paquin in 2018
- Born: Anna Helene Paquin; 24 July 1982 (age 44); Winnipeg, Manitoba, Canada
- Other name: Anna Emery
- Citizenship: New Zealand; Canada
- Occupation: Actress
- Years active: 1993–present
- Spouse: Stephen Moyer (m. 2010)
- Children: 2
- Awards: Full list

Anna Helene Paquin (/ˈpækwɪn/ PAK-win; born 24 July 1982) is a New Zealand actress. Born in Winnipeg, Canada, and raised in Wellington, she made her acting debut in the romantic drama film The Piano (1993), for which she won the Academy Award for Best Supporting Actress at the age of 11, becoming the second-youngest winner in Oscar history. As a child actress, she had roles in Fly Away Home (1996), Jane Eyre (1996), Amistad (1997), The Member of the Wedding (1997), and A Walk on the Moon (1999), as well as in Cameron Crowe's comedy drama film Almost Famous (2000).

Paquin continued to perform prominent roles into adulthood, portraying Rogue in the X-Men franchise (2000–2006, 2014). Her other film credits include 25th Hour (2002), Trick 'r Treat (2007), Margaret (2011), The Good Dinosaur (2015), and The Irishman (2019). She played the lead role of Sookie Stackhouse in the HBO vampire drama television series True Blood (2008–2014), for which she won a Golden Globe Award for Best Actress in 2009. Among other accolades, Paquin was nominated for a Primetime Emmy Award and a Golden Globe Award for her work in the television film Bury My Heart at Wounded Knee (2007), in addition to a further Golden Globe nomination for her work in the television film The Courageous Heart of Irena Sendler (2009).

== Early life ==
Paquin was born on 24 July 1982 in Winnipeg, Manitoba, Canada. Her father, Brian Paquin, is a retired Canadian physical education teacher, and her mother, Mary Brophy, is a New Zealand teacher of English from Wellington. Brian is of Dutch and French descent. Paquin holds dual New Zealand and Canadian citizenship. The youngest of three children, she has a brother and a sister. Paquin has stated that, due to the Great Famine, all her maternal great-grandparents had immigrated to New Zealand from Ireland.

The family moved to Wellington in 1986, and Paquin attended Raphael House Rudolf Steiner School, Hutt Intermediate School and Wellington Girls' College. Her parents divorced when she was 12 years old. She moved to the United States at the age of 16. Paquin then attended Windward School, graduating in 2000. She studied for one year at Columbia College, living in Carman Hall. She subsequently dropped out to continue her acting career.

== Career ==
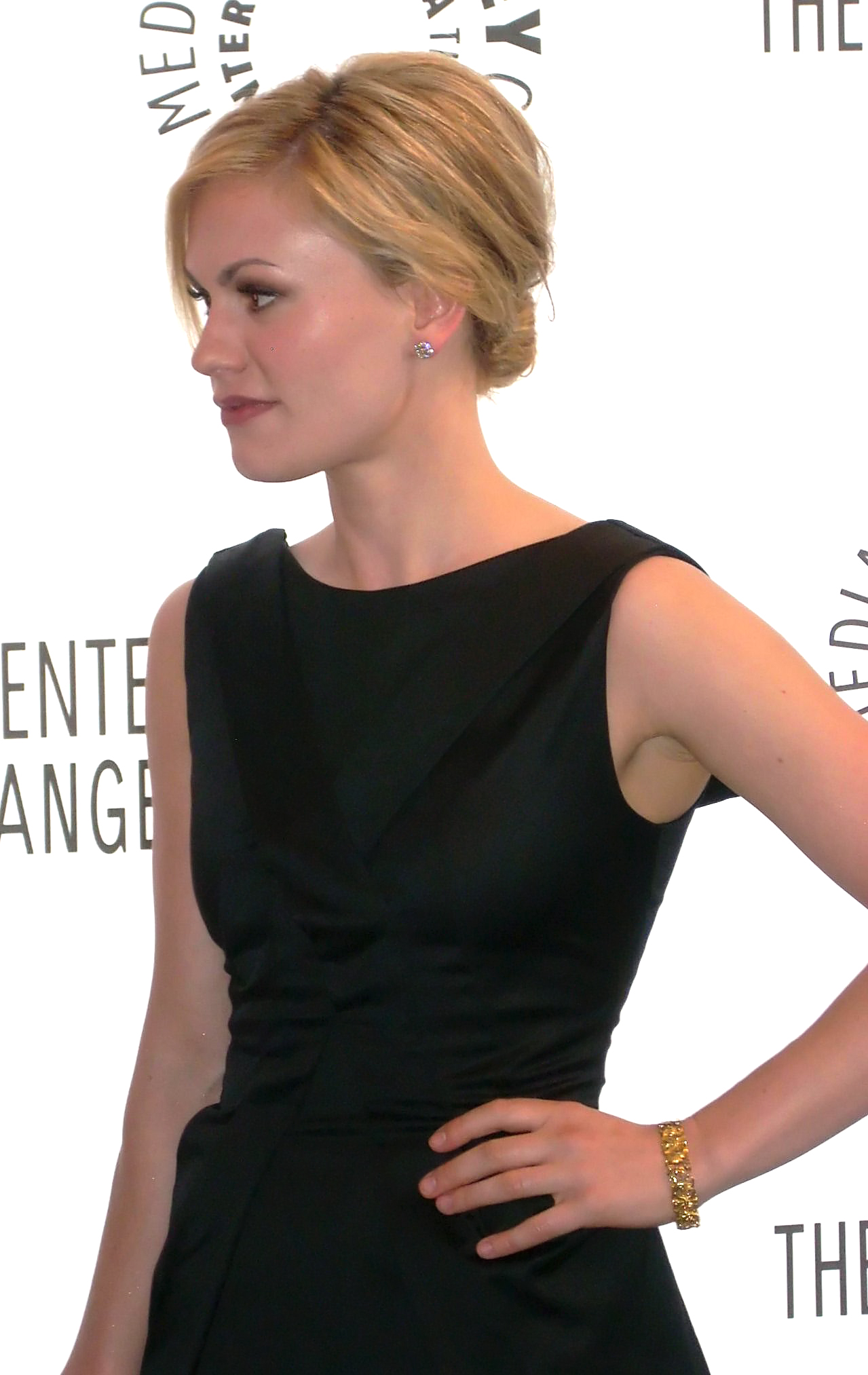
Paquin at the 25th Annual Paley Television Festival, April 2009

Director Jane Campion was looking for a little girl to play a main role in The Piano, set to film in New Zealand, and a newspaper advertisement was run announcing an open audition. Paquin's sister read the ad and went to try out with a friend; this inspired Paquin to audition. When Campion met Paquin—whose only acting experience had been as a skunk in a school play—she was very impressed with the nine-year-old's performance of the monologue about Flora's father, and she was chosen from among the 5000 candidates. When The Piano was released in 1993 it was lauded by critics, won prizes at a number of film festivals, and eventually became a popular film among a wide audience. Paquin's debut performance in the film earned her the 1994 Academy Award for Best Supporting Actress at the age of 11, making her the second-youngest winner in the category, behind Tatum O'Neal.

The Piano was made as a small independent film and was not expected to be widely known, and Paquin and her family did not plan to continue to pursue acting. However, she was invited to the William Morris Agency, and she kept receiving offers for new roles. She systematically rejected them, but she did appear in three commercials for the phone company MCI in 1994. She later made a series of television commercials for Manitoba Telecom Systems in her birth city of Winnipeg. She also appeared as a voice in an audiobook entitled The Magnificent Nose in 1994. In 1996, she appeared in two films. The first role was as young Jane in Jane Eyre. The other was a lead part in Fly Away Home playing a young girl who, after her mother dies, moves in with her father and finds solace in taking care of orphaned goslings. As a teenager, she had roles in other films, including A Walk on the Moon, Finding Forrester, Amistad, Hurlyburly, She's All That and Almost Famous. In the 2003 English dub of the Studio Ghibli film Castle in the Sky, she voiced the main female protagonist, Sheeta.

Paquin played the mutant superhero Rogue in the Marvel Comics movie X-Men in 2000, its sequel X2 in 2003, and its third instalment, X-Men: The Last Stand, in 2006. Between 2006 and 2007, she starred in, as well as executive-produced Blue State. The film is made by Paquin Films, a production company formed by her and her brother, Andrew. In November 2006, she completed the film Margaret, which was released in 2011. She played Elaine Goodale in HBO's made-for-TV film Bury My Heart at Wounded Knee, based on Dee Brown's best-seller, garnering a Primetime Emmy Award nomination. In 2007, she played the role of Laurie in the horror film Trick 'r Treat, which was released in 2009.

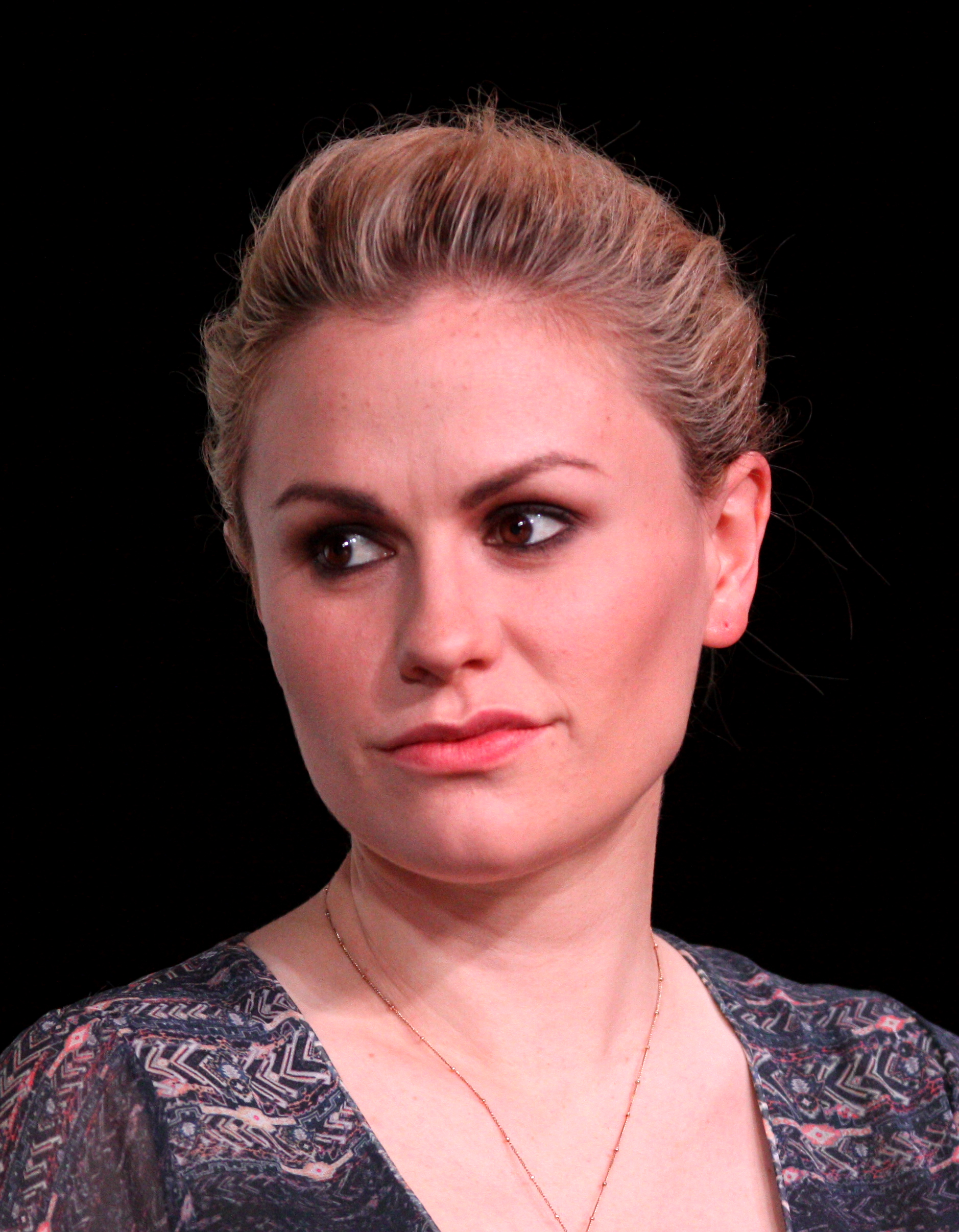
Paquin at the 2012 San Diego Comic-Con

Paquin was cast as waitress Sookie Stackhouse in the HBO series True Blood in 2008, her first role in a TV series. The show is based on The Southern Vampire Mysteries series of novels by Charlaine Harris, set in the fictional town of Bon Temps, Louisiana. The series saw Paquin doing nude scenes for the first time. While working on True Blood, she started dating co-star Stephen Moyer and later married him in 2010. In 2009, Paquin played Irena Sendler, a Polish woman hailed as a heroine of the Holocaust, in The Courageous Heart of Irena Sendler, a CBS TV film biographical film based on the book Mother of the Children of the Holocaust: The Irena Sendler Story, by Anna Mieszkowska. The film was made in Latvia, and was a Hallmark Hall of Fame presentation for the network.

In 2010, Paquin's film The Romantics, a romantic comedy with Josh Duhamel and Katie Holmes, was released in the US at selected cinemas in September. She played a cameo role in Scream 4, alongside Kristen Bell in 2011. She also played the voice of Kristin on an episode of Phineas and Ferb. Paquin reprised her role as Rogue in the 2014 film X-Men: Days of Future Past, but most of her scenes were cut out for the theatrical release. An alternative version of the film with all of Paquin's scenes reinstated was released as The Rogue Cut on 14 July 2015. Paquin voiced Ramsey in Disney•Pixar's film The Good Dinosaur. She also played Nancy Holt, the wife of a Confederate soldier, in the 2016 miniseries Roots.

In June 2016, the Human Rights Campaign released a video in tribute to the victims of the Orlando nightclub shooting; in the video, Paquin and others told the stories of the people killed there. Later in 2017 Paquin starred in television series Bellevue, also being the executive producer, and acted as Nancy Montgomery in the television miniseries Alias Grace. In 2018, she acted in husband Stephen Moyer's directorial debut, The Parting Glass, and in Laurie Collyer's comedy-drama film Furlough.

In 2019, Paquin appeared in Martin Scorsese's critically acclaimed drama, The Irishman. That year, she also produced and starred as Robyn in television series Flack and appeared in the television series The Affair. In 2021, she portrayed the wife of Kurt Warner in the biographical Christian sports film, American Underdog.

In 2022, Paquin starred in A Friend of the Family for Peacock.

In 2023, Paquin starred in Netflix Original True Spirit alongside Teagan Croft and Cliff Curtis. The movie is based on the journey of Jessica Watson, an Australian sailor who attempted solo global circumnavigation at 16 years old, with Paquin playing her mother.

== Personal life ==
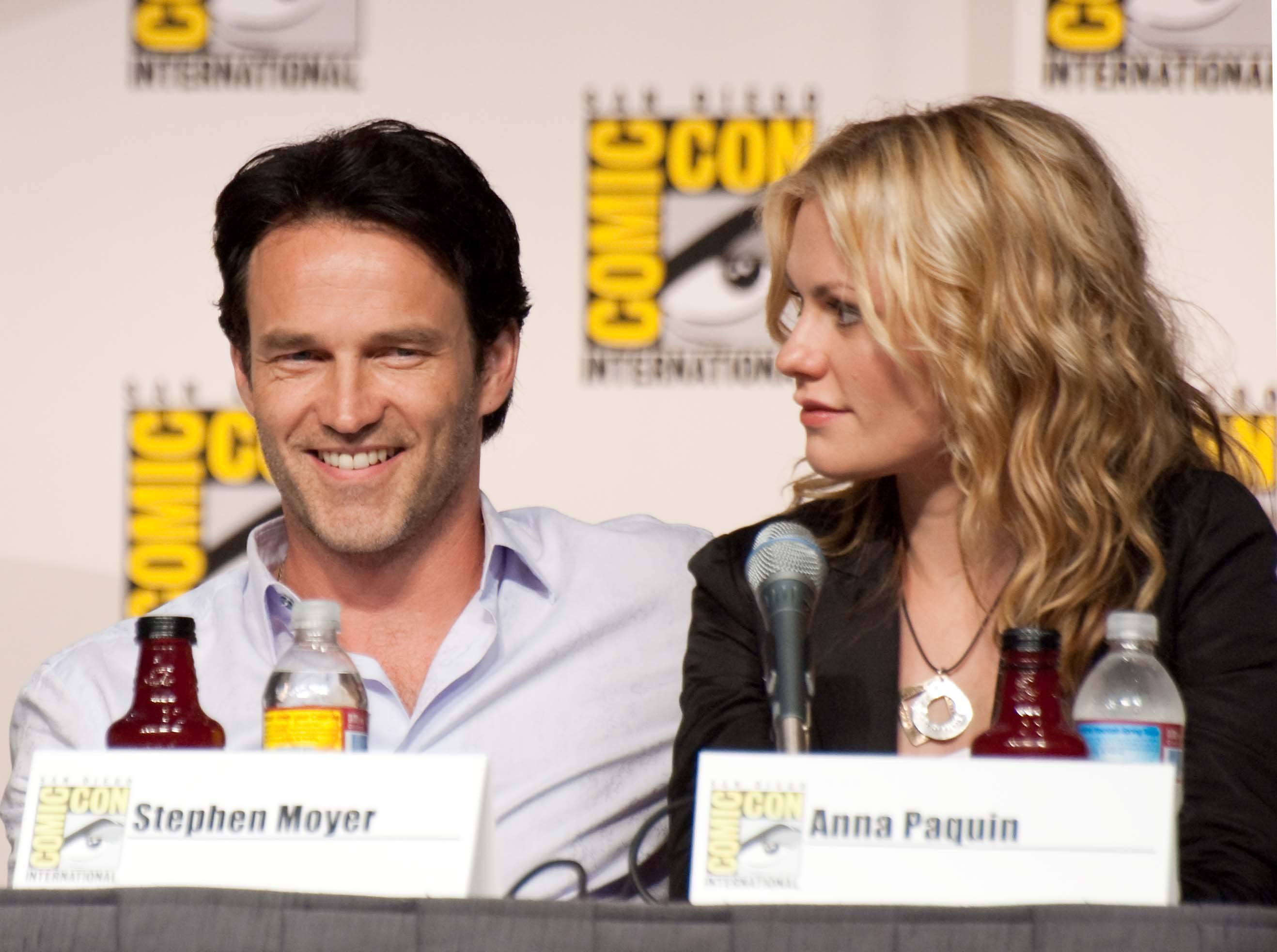
Paquin with husband and True Blood costar Stephen Moyer, 2009

On 5 August 2009, Paquin announced her engagement to her True Blood co-star Stephen Moyer, whom she had been dating since filming the series pilot in 2007. They married on 21 August 2010 at a private residence in Malibu, California. Paquin gave birth to fraternal twins on 12 September 2012. She has a stepson and a stepdaughter through her marriage to Moyer. The couple reside in Venice, Los Angeles, and visit New Zealand yearly to see Paquin's family.

In 2010, Paquin came out as bisexual in a public service announcement for the Give a Damn campaign as part of the True Colors Fund, an advocacy group organised by Cyndi Lauper dedicated to LGBT equality. The video features Paquin stating, "I'm Anna Paquin. I'm bisexual, and I give a damn." When asked about her participation in the video, Paquin said her sexuality had not been a secret but that she had not "ever had an opportunity to speak out about [it] in a way that would be useful. Obviously I know that one person's voice doesn't necessarily do that much, but I just wanted to do my bit." In May 2012, in an Us Weekly interview Paquin rejected the notion that bisexuality is a choice. "My sexuality is not made up, for a bisexual, it's not about gender. That's not the deciding factor to who they're attracted to," stated Paquin. In 2014, she described herself on Twitter as "Proud to be a happily married bisexual mother".

Paquin also supports other charities and foundations such as the Children's Hospital Los Angeles, Make-A-Wish Foundation, Elton John AIDS Foundation, and The Art of Elysium.

== Acting credits ==
=== Film ===
| Year | Title | Role | Notes | Ref(s) |
|---|---|---|---|---|
| 1993 | The Piano | Flora McGrath | Academy Award for Best Supporting Actress | |
| 1996 | Jane Eyre | Young Jane Eyre | | |
| 1996 | Fly Away Home | Amy Alden | | |
| 1997 | Amistad | Queen Isabella II of Spain | | |
| 1998 | Hurlyburly | Donna | | |
| 1999 | A Walk on the Moon | Alison Kantrowitz | | |
| 1999 | She's All That | Mackenzie Siler | | |
| 1999 | It's the Rage | Annabel Lee | | |
| 2000 | Castle in the Sky | Sheeta (voice) | English dub | |
| 2000 | X-Men | Anna Marie/Rogue | | |
| 2000 | Almost Famous | Polexia Aphrodisia | | |
| 2000 | Finding Forrester | Claire Spence | | |
| 2001 | Buffalo Soldiers | Robyn Lee | | |
| 2002 | Darkness | Regina | | |
| 2002 | 25th Hour | Mary D'Annunzio | | |
| 2003 | X2 | Anna Marie / Rogue | | |
| 2005 | Steamboy | James Ray Steam (voice) | English dub | |
| 2005 | The Squid and the Whale | Lili | | |
| 2006 | X-Men: The Last Stand | Anna Marie/ Rogue | | |
| 2007 | Blue State | Chloe Hamon | Also executive producer | |
| 2007 | Mosaic | Maggie (voice) | | |
| 2007 | Trick 'r Treat | Laurie | | |
| 2010 | The Romantics | Lila Hayes | | |
| 2010 | Open House | Jennie | | |
| 2011 | Scream 4 | Rachel | Cameo | |
| 2011 | Margaret | Lisa Cohen | | |
| 2013 | Straight A's | Katherine | | |
| 2013 | Free Ride | Christina | Also producer | |
| 2014 | X-Men: Days of Future Past | Anna Marie / Rogue | Cameo; expanded role in The Rogue Cut | |
| 2015 | The Good Dinosaur | Ramsey (voice) | | |
| 2018 | Furlough | Lily Benson | | |
| 2018 | The Parting Glass | Colleen | Also producer | |
| 2018 | Tell It to the Bees | Jean Markham | | |
| 2019 | The Irishman | Peggy Sheeran | | |
| 2021 | American Underdog | Brenda Warner | | |
| 2022 | A Bit of Light | Ella | Also producer | |
| 2023 | True Spirit | Julie Watson | | |

=== Television ===
| Year | Title | Role | Notes | Ref(s) |
|---|---|---|---|---|
| 1997 | The Member of the Wedding | Frankie Adams | Television film | |
| 2007 | Bury My Heart at Wounded Knee | Elaine Goodale | Television film | |
| 2008–2014 | True Blood | Sookie Stackhouse | Main role | |
| 2009 | The Courageous Heart of Irena Sendler | Irena Sendler | Television film | |
| 2011 | Phineas and Ferb | Kristen (voice) | Episode: "The Curse of Candace" | |
| 2013 | Susanna | Katie | Main role | |
| 2016 | Roots | Nancy Holt | Episode: "Part 4" | |
| 2017 | Bellevue | Annie Ryder | Main role; also executive producer | |
| 2017 | Alias Grace | Nancy Montgomery | Main role | |
| 2017 | Philip K. Dick's Electric Dreams | Sarah | Episode: "Real Life" | |
| 2019 | The Affair | Joanie Lockhart | Main role (season 5) | |
| 2019–2020 | Flack | Robyn | Main role; also executive producer | |
| 2021 | Modern Love | Isabelle | Episode: "In the Waiting Room of Estranged Spouses" | |
| 2022 | A Friend of the Family | Mary Ann Broberg | Miniseries | |

=== Theatre ===
| Year | Title | Role | Venue | Ref(s) |
|---|---|---|---|---|
| 2001 | The Glory of Living | Lisa | MCC Theater | |
| 2002 | This Is Our Youth | Jessica Goldman | Garrick Theatre | |
| 2003 | Manuscript | Elizabeth Hawkins | Falmouth Academy | |
| 2003 | Drug Buddy | Wendy | Manhattan Theatre Club | |
| 2004 | Roulette | Jenny | Ensemble Studio Theatre | |
| 2004 | The Distance from Here | Shari | MCC Theater | |
| 2004 | The 24-Hour Plays, South of the Border | Maylene | MCC Theater | |
| 2005 | After Ashley | Julie Bell | Vineyard Theatre | |
| 2005 | Dog Sees God: Confessions of a Teenage Blockhead | Marcy | Westside Theatre | |
| 2006 | The 24 Hour Plays, The Blizzard | Jenny | MCC Theater | |

== See also ==
- List of actors with Academy Award nominations
- List of oldest and youngest Academy Award winners and nominees — Youngest winners for Best Supporting Actress
- List of LGBTQ Academy Award winners and nominees — Confirmed individuals for Best Supporting Actress
- List of New Zealand Academy Award winners and nominees
- List of Canadian Academy Award winners and nominees
