= Lights Out (2011 TV series) =

American television boxing drama series

- Tagline: "Everybody loves a comeback."
- Genre: Sports drama
- Created by: Justin Zackham
- Starring: Holt McCallany; Stacy Keach; Catherine McCormack; Pablo Schreiber; Meredith Hagner; Ryann Shane; Lily Pilblad; Billy Brown
- Country of origin: United States
- Original language: English
- No. of seasons: 1
- No. of episodes: 13

Production
- Executive producers: Ross Fineman; Warren Leight; Phillip Noyce; Justin Zackham
- Producer: Robin Veith
- Production locations: Bayonne, New Jersey; Jersey City, New Jersey
- Running time: 40–43 minutes
- Production companies: Warren Leight Productions; Fineman Entertainment; Fox Television Studios; FX Productions

Original release
- Network: FX
- Release: January 11 – April 5, 2011

Lights Out is an American boxing drama television series from the FX network in the United States. It stars Holt McCallany as Patrick "Lights" Leary, a New Jersey native, and former heavyweight champion boxer who is considering a comeback. The series premiered on January 11, 2011, at 10 p.m. ET/PT. On March 24, 2011, FX announced the cancellation of the show. The final episode aired on April 5.

== Plot synopsis ==
An aging, former world heavyweight champion, Patrick "Lights" Leary is an extremely proud, good-hearted Irish American who is struggling to find his identity after retiring from his beloved boxing. After years of wear and tear in the ring, he is diagnosed with pugilistic dementia (a neurological disorder that affects boxers who suffered too many hits to the head, gradually causing memory loss and constant headaches). Now, Lights is struggling to support his family (a wife and three daughters) and their comfortably secure lifestyle in Bayonne, New Jersey, after his amoral and incompetent brother/business manager squanders Lights' life savings. Running out of ways—and time—to earn enough money to re-secure his family's future, Leary must decide whether to either: accept the brutal and demeaning job of debt collector for a local racketeer; or, launch a long shot, health-risking, comeback for the huge payday that would result from becoming "the champ" once again.

== Cast ==
- Holt McCallany as Patrick "Lights" Leary
- Pablo Schreiber as Johnny Leary
- Catherine McCormack as Theresa Leary
- Stacy Keach as Robert "Pops" Leary
- Meredith Hagner as Ava Leary
- Ryann Shane as Daniella Leary
- Lily Pilblad as Katherine Leary
- Billy Brown as Richard "Death Row" Reynolds
- Elizabeth Marvel as Margaret Leary
- Bill Irwin as Hal Brennan
- Reg E. Cathey as Barry K. Word
- Eamonn Walker as Ed Romeo

== Episodes ==
No.	Title	Directed by	Written by	Original release date	US viewers (millions)
1	"Pilot"	Norberto Barba & Clark Johnson	Justin Zackham	January 11, 2011	1.487
Former heavyweight boxing champion Patrick "Lights" Leary (Holt McCallany) struggles to find his identity after retiring from the sport. He also wonders how he is going to support his medical resident wife Theresa (Catherine McCormack), and their three daughters. The series premiere begins five years after Leary's retirement following a controversial split-decision loss to Richard "Death Row" Reynolds (Billy Brown). The Learys' once charmed life is on shaky ground; the IRS is determined to take away their mansion, and Patrick's brother/manager Johnny (Pablo Schreiber) wants him to make a comeback, despite him showing signs of pugilistic dementia.
2	"Cakewalk"	Norberto Barba	Warren Leight	January 18, 2011	0.921
When Leary is threatened with criminal charges, he must do the bidding of bookmaker Hal Brennan (Bill Irwin) to make them go away. Lights is also being coy with his suspicious wife Theresa, and Mike Fumosa (Ben Shenkman), a pesky reporter—both having heard rumors that he will return to the ring to fight Reynolds. Meanwhile, his daughter Daniella (Ryann Shane) finds out about her father's diagnosis and confronts him.
3	"The Shot"	Ed Bianchi	Bryan Goluboff	January 25, 2011	0.819
Lights struggles to help train his father's young fighter, Omar "The Armenian Avenger" Assarian (Pedro Pascal) for the middleweight championship against Monte "The Hurricane" Harris (Corey Michael Lincoln). Omar may be the best hope for Leary Gym of becoming a champion since Lights retired. However, promoter Barry K. Word (Reg E. Cathey) is only interested in getting Omar into the fight if Johnny agrees to a deal involving Lights' return. Meanwhile, Patrick's family makes him a memory book for his 40th birthday and he spends the rest of the night watching the outcome of the fight.
4	"Bolo Punch"	Norberto Barba	Carter Harris	February 1, 2011	0.864
Johnny gets himself in a life-threatening situation when he is unable to pay his gambling debt after betting on Omar's fight. So Lights has to put himself on the line to bail him out by fighting an MMA fighter named Dokaj (Bas Rutten) in order to make the money and save his brother. Meanwhile, Theresa offers to donate $50,000 to help rebuild a clinic that her church is involved with in Haiti, but she soon discovers that the family's $12 million from Lights' fighting career is all gone.
5	"The Comeback"	Rosemary Rodriguez	Story by : Nathan Jackson & Warren Leight; Teleplay by : Warren Leight, Eli Bauman & Joe Tracz	February 8, 2011	0.803
The Learys' financial situation turns more desperate and they are advised to consider bankruptcy. However, Lights decides to make a comeback with a few easy fights, but discovers Johnny's deal with Barry Word. Despite this, Lights tries to find his own fight enlisting Reynolds' old sparring partner Jo Jo Reade (Hisham Tawfiq) for his next opponent. But an unfortunate accident causes him to take on a harder challenger in the dangerous ex-con Javier "El Diablo" Morales (Gavin-Keith Umeh) and the aftershock threatens Lights' and Theresa's marriage.
6	"Combinations"	Tom DiCillo	Stu Zicherman	February 15, 2011	0.700
Lights starts training for his fight with El Diablo—his first fight in five years, while dealing with the heartbreak of being away from his family. While sparring, he receives an injury from a thumb to the eye, causing him to see double. This gets him into trouble hanging out with Johnny who tries to help his brother's well-being by setting him up with a call girl. When stories fly about his night out and that the fact he has been cage fighting for money, Lights seeks advice from reporter Mike Fumosa to make the story go away, but he wants to write about Lights' private life in return.
7	"Crossroads"	Ken Girotti	Robin Veith	February 22, 2011	0.742
As the fight with Morales nears, Lights finds himself at a crossroad in his life and career. He is about to attempt a comeback both in the ring trying for his 36th win, and at home trying to gain the support of his family. But when he asks Theresa to be in his corner for the fight, he instead gets unwanted support from an unlikely ally.
8	"Head Games"	Phil Abraham	Bryan Goluboff	March 1, 2011	0.802
When his father decides not to train him because he does not think he is capable of fighting at a professional level anymore, Lights turns to Ed Romeo (Eamonn Walker), Reynolds' former trainer for some heightening of his skills. Not only does Ed train him in an unorthodox style, he tries to make Lights realize he should fight for his wife and girls, and cut his father, brother, and sister out for the fact that they are suffocating him. Lights takes this into account when he grows suspicious of their sudden interest to help him with his big fight in an effort to fire Romeo.
9	"Infight"	Jean de Segonzac	Story by : Bryan Goluboff & Warren Leight; Teleplay by : John P. Roche	March 8, 2011	0.797
Lights alliance to Ed Romeo, his new boxing mentor comes between him and his family. Although, Romeo likes Teresa and the girls, he wants Lights to cut his father and brother out because he thinks they are weighting him down. This does not sit well with Lights, who in return, tells Romeo he does not feel free of them, but feels controlled by him and decides to free himself of his eccentric trainer. Meanwhile, at the gym, Johnny and Romeo get into a fight, which ends up in an unfortunate accident for Lights.
10	"Cut Men"	Nick Gomez	Carter Harris	March 15, 2011	0.688
After being accidentally stabbed with scissors by Johnny, Lights' injury puts his comeback, his health and Theresa's medical career in jeopardy, especially when Barry Word can not postpone the fight because of the penalty fees. As his family's expenses pile up, Lights tries to speed up the healing process by secretly seeing a doctor to give him a potent "medicine cocktail" mixed with prednisone. Lights tries to recover from his unfortunate injury, but finds out from Mike Fumosa—now a TV reporter—that Word is already setting up Reynolds' next fight with a Ukrainian Muslim boxer named Mustafa. Meanwhile, Lights and Johnny find out that Margaret is seeing gangster Hal Brennan, and think he is playing her to get closer to Light's and backing his fight.
11	"Rainmaker"	Norberto Barba	Robin Veith	March 22, 2011	0.693
Lights tries to help a hard-up former champ, Jerry "The Rainmaker" Raynes (David Morse), but the punchy boxer ends up helping him. Meanwhile, Councilman Randall Hess (Patrick Collins) is brought in for questioning in a prostitution scandal and is all of a sudden "talkative" with the FBI. Hess threatens Lights' future by trying to get him to confess his involvement in having the councilman take a bribe when he delivered a cake box full of cash from Brennan. However, Lights gets arrested for bribing a public official and has to find a way out without jeopardizing his family and his upcoming fight.
12	"Sucker Punch"	Jean de Segonzac	Stu Zicherman	March 29, 2011	0.614
Things are heating up two weeks before the big fight when Lights is no longer the favorite to win and is a 6 to 1 underdog. This makes Barry Word worried and tells him take a dive. Furthermore, Lights gets a surprise visit from his estranged mother, Mae (Valerie Perrine), who has left the family several times over the years. Though Margaret considers her mother dead and Johnny suspects her of wanting a handout, Mae claims she just wants her family back, so Lights and Pops try to reunite with her.
13	"War"	Norberto Barba	Story by : Bryan Goluboff & Warren Leight; Teleplay by : Warren Leight	April 5, 2011	0.636
After all the trials and tribulations that led up to the championship fight, Lights goes to "war" when he finally faces off with "Death Row" Reynolds for the heavyweight title. Before the big fight, Hal Brennan gathers all the former champs that have been burned by Barry Word and starts a war against him by starting a new boxing alliance called United Boxers. But in order for Lights to be a part of it, he suggests a 10 percent cut for a health fund to help all the boxers in need of medical care. Meanwhile, Word has a pre-fight talk with Lights, and it is not very inspiring the night before the fight. Theresa has her own talk with Reynold's wife, Jennifer (Reiko Aylesworth). As soon as the third round begins, Lights manages to K.O. Reynolds and wins back his title, but suffers a severe concussion. After the fight Theresa makes a shocking discovery about Lights: she goes to bring him to the post-fight press conference, when he asks her, "Who won?"

== Reception ==
Lights Out has received positive reviews from television critics. Review aggregate Metacritic awarded the series a score of 79%, based on 25 reviews, indicating "Generally favorable reviews". Matt Roush from TV Guide said "Lights Out delivers a sucker punch of downbeat realism as Leary takes a pounding from life but refuses to give up. McCallany brings such a weary dignity to the role you can't help but root for him." He went on to say "Lights Out has its work cut out for it to find and hold an audience and deliver the proverbial TKO, but on the basis of the work alone, it's a triumph." The New York Times review said "In other words, even the soapier subplots of Lights Out are sparingly written and tautly filmed, and the story never strays too far from the violence that is at its core. It's an ambitious drama that doesn't lose sight of what Patrick tells a television interviewer about retirement: 'Sometimes, you miss hitting people.'" Brian Lowry at Variety said in his review "Lights Out isn't an unqualified knockout, but in its milieu, leading man and rich supporting players, score the show a clear winner on points. And that's no bull." James Poniewozik from Time said "It starts and finishes strong, and in between, it passed the most important test this non-boxing-fan could hold it to: when I finished one episode, I immediately wanted to put another in." Matthew Gilbert of The Boston Globe said "The story of Patrick 'Lights' Leary is engrossing from the first bell, with nicely developed plots and psychological twists that transcend the genre cliches of the boxing drama. And the acting is strong where it matters." Dorothy Rabinowitz from The Wall Street Journal said in her review "It's quickly clear that this skillfully sustained, sharply plotted series is a fighter saga you'll want to follow to the final bell." Ed Bark from Uncle Barky said "It sometimes lapses into the abundant cliches of its genre. Pound for pound, though, you won't see many better dramas this season. Gloves on or off, it keeps scoring points."

Lights Out drew 1.5 million viewers in its pilot episode—793,000 of them from the highly sought-after 18- to 49-year-old demographic. Viewership declined from there, however, with the series averaging 863,000 viewers per episode.

Lights Out was cancelled by FX on March 24.
