= The Bucket List =

2007 comedy-drama film by Rob Reiner

- Theatrical release poster
- Directed by: Rob Reiner
- Written by: Justin Zackham
- Produced by: Craig Zadan; Neil Meron; Alan Greisman; Rob Reiner
- Starring: Jack Nicholson; Morgan Freeman; Sean Hayes; Rob Morrow
- Cinematography: John Schwartzman
- Edited by: Robert Leighton
- Music by: Marc Shaiman
- Production companies: Zadan/Meron Productions; Reiner/Greisman Productions
- Distributed by: Warner Bros. Pictures
- Release dates: December 15, 2007 (Hollywood); December 25, 2007 (United States)
- Running time: 97 minutes
- Country: United States
- Language: English
- Budget: $45 million
- Box office: $175.4 million

The Bucket List is a 2007 American buddy comedy-drama film directed and produced by Rob Reiner, written by Justin Zackham, and starring Jack Nicholson and Morgan Freeman. The main plot follows two terminally ill men on their road trip with a wish list of things to do before they "kick the bucket".

Zackham coined the expression "bucket list" after he wrote his own "List of Things to do Before I Kick the Bucket" and shortened it to "Justin's Bucket List". The first item on his list was to "get a film made at a major studio". This list gave him the idea for the screenplay, and The Bucket List became his first studio film.

The film premiered on December 15, 2007, in Hollywood and opened in limited release in the United States on December 25, 2007, by Warner Bros. Pictures. The film then had a wide release on January 11, 2008. Despite receiving mixed reviews from critics, the film was chosen by National Board of Review as one of the top ten films of 2007 and was a box office success, opening at #1 in the United States, and grossed over $175.4 million worldwide, against a $45 million budget.

== Plot ==
Two elderly men, blue-collar automotive mechanic Carter Chambers and billionaire Edward Cole, meet for the first time in a hospital owned by Edward after both men are diagnosed with terminal lung cancer.

Carter, a gifted amateur historian and family man, wanted to become a history professor in his youth but had to make a choice when he was having a baby. Edward is a four-time divorced healthcare tycoon and cultured loner. He enjoys drinking kopi luwak, one of the most expensive coffees in the world and mocking his personal valet Matthew, whom he wrongly but intentionally calls Thomas.

While in the hospital, Carter and Edward manage to find common ground. For fun, Carter started writing a list of activities to do before he "kicks the bucket." After hearing he has less than a year to live, he dejectedly discards his list.

Edward finds the list the next morning and urges Carter to do everything on it, adds his own items and offers to finance all expenses. He agrees, although his wife Virginia objects, so the two patients begin their globetrotting last vacation along with Matthew. They go skydiving, drive a vintage Shelby Mustang and Dodge Challenger around California Speedway, fly over the North Pole, eat dinner at Chèvre d'or, visit the Taj Mahal, ride motorcycles on the Great Wall of China, attend a lion safari in Tanzania and visit Mount Everest.

Atop the Great Pyramid of Giza, they confide mutually about faith and family. Carter reveals that he has long been feeling less in love with his wife and feels some regret for his chosen path. Edward discloses that he is deeply hurt by his estrangement from his only daughter, who distanced herself after he drove away her abusive husband. Later, while in Hong Kong, Edward hires a prostitute to approach Carter, as he has never been with any woman but his wife. Carter declines and insists they stop the bucket list and go home.

During the return journey, Carter tries to reunite Edward with his estranged daughter. Considering this a breach of trust, Edward scolds him and then angrily storms off. Carter returns home to his family while he, feeling alone, breaks down weeping in his luxury home.

Carter's family reunion turns out to be short-lived as, while readying for marital romance, he suffers a seizure and is rushed to the hospital. There, it is discovered that the cancer has spread to his brain. Edward, now in a remarkable remission, visits him to reconcile.

Carter, always a Jeopardy! fan and knowledgeable trivia fanatic, reveals how Edward's kopi luwak coffee is fed to and defecated by an Asian palm civet cat before being harvested. As the two laugh hysterically over the obscure fact, crossing off the item 'laugh to tears', Carter implores Edward to finish the list for him.

After Carter dies during surgery, Edward manages to reconcile with his own daughter, who introduces him to the granddaughter he never knew he had. After greeting the little girl by kissing her cheek, he thoughtfully crosses "kiss the most beautiful girl in the world" off the bucket list. Soon after, Edward delivers a eulogy at Carter's funeral, during which he explains that the last three months of Carter's life were, thanks to Carter, the best three months of his own.

An epilogue reveals that Edward lived to age 81 and Matthew then took his ashes to a peak in the Himalayas. As he places a Chock full o'Nuts coffee can of Edward's ashes alongside another can of Carter's ashes, he crosses off the last item on the bucket list, "witness something truly majestic", and tucks the completed list between the cans. A posthumous voice-over from Carter says that he thought Edward would have gotten a laugh out of being buried on the mountain, as it is "against the law".

== Cast ==
- Jack Nicholson as Edward Perriman Cole
- Morgan Freeman as Carter Chambers
- Sean Hayes as Matthew / Thomas
- Beverly Todd as Virginia Chambers
- Rob Morrow as Dr Hollins
- Alfonso Freeman as Roger Chambers
- Rowena King as Angelica
- Jennifer DeFrancisco as Emily Cole
- Serena Reeder as Rachel
- Annton Berry Jr as Kai
- Verda Bridges as Chandra
- Destiny Brownridge as Maya
- Brian Copeland as Lee
- Ian Anthony Dale as Instructor
- Noel Guglielmi as Mechanic
- Jonathan Hernandez as Manny
- Andrea J. Johnson as Elizabeth
- Jordan Lund as Tattoo Artist
- Jonathan Mangum as Richard
- Christopher Stapleton as Kyle
- Alex Trebek as Himself
- Taylor Ann Thompson as Edward's Granddaughter
- Karen Maruyama as Nurse Shing

== Release ==
The film opened in wide release in the United States and Canada on January 11, 2008, and grossed $19,392,416 from around 3,200 screens across 2,911 theaters, averaging $6,662 per theater ($6,060 per screen) and ranking #1 at the box office. The film closed on June 5, 2008, never having a weekend-to-weekend decline of more than 40%, and ended up with a final gross of $93,466,502 in the United States and Canada and another $81,906,000 overseas, for a total gross of $175,372,502 worldwide, easily recouping the film's considerable $45 million budget and turning a sizable profit for Warner Bros.

== Reception ==
The Bucket List received mixed reviews from critics. On Rotten Tomatoes, the film has a rating of 40% based on 177 reviews, with an average rating of 5.20/10. The site's critical consensus reads, "Not even the earnest performances of the two leads can rescue The Bucket List from its schmaltzy script". Metacritic gave the film a score of 42 out of 100, based on 34 critics, indicating "mixed or average reviews". Audiences polled by CinemaScore gave the film an average grade of "A−" on an A+ to F scale.

Chicago Sun-Times film critic Roger Ebert, who was diagnosed with thyroid cancer in 2002 and whose lower jaw was removed in 2006, criticized the film's portrayal of cancer sufferers, writing in his one-star review that The Bucket List "...thinks dying of cancer is a laff riot followed by a dime-store epiphany."

=== Accolades ===
The Bucket List was named one of the ten best films of 2007 by the National Board of Review.

Award	Date of ceremony	Category	Recipient(s)	Result	Ref.
AARP Movies for Grownups Awards	February 4, 2008	Best Movie for Grownups	The Bucket List	Nominated	
AARP Movies for Grownups Awards	February 4, 2008	Best Buddy Picture	The Bucket List	Won	
Golden Reel Awards	February 23, 2008	Outstanding Achievement in Sound Editing – Dialogue and ADR for Feature Film	The Bucket List	Nominated	
Grammy Awards	February 8, 2009	Best Song Written for Visual Media	John Mayer for "Say"	Nominated	
Japan Academy Film Prize	February 20, 2009	Outstanding Foreign Language Film	The Bucket List	Nominated	
National Board of Review Awards	January 15, 2008	Top Ten Films	The Bucket List	Won	
Village Voice Film Poll	2008	Worst Film	The Bucket List	1st Place (Note: Tied with Southland Tales)	

== Soundtrack ==
A score album from Varèse Sarabande was released on January 15, 2008, featuring composer Marc Shaiman's original score for the film as well as a selection of newly recorded themes from Shaiman's previous scoring projects, including City Slickers, Simon Birch, The Addams Family, Mother, North, Sleepless in Seattle, South Park: Bigger Longer & Uncut, Mr. Saturday Night, and Stuart Saves His Family.

It also features a rearranged version of the James Bond theme "Goldfinger" (titled "Printmaster"), with Shaiman's own voice and lyrics in which he spoofs the industry's habit of tracking music in scenes where they do not belong.

The full list of 23 songs is as follows:

1. Hospital Hallway (from the movie)
2. Like Smoke through a Keyhole (from the movie)
3. Best in L.A. (from the movie)
4. Really Bad News (from the movie)
5. Milord – Édith Piaf (from the movie)
6. Hotel Source (from the movie)
7. Did You Hear It? (from the movie)
8. Flying Home (from the movie)
9. Homecomings (from the movie)
10. Life and Death (from the movie)
11. The Mountain (from the movie)
12. End Credits (from the movie)
13. Theme from The American President ("A Seed of Grain")
14. Theme from City Slickers
15. Theme from Simon Birch
16. Theme from The Addams Family
17. Theme from Mother
18. Theme from North
19. Sleepless in Seattle / A Wink and a Smile"
20. South Park: Bigger Longer & Uncut/ "Blame Canada"
21. Theme from Mr. Saturday Night
22. "Printmaster" (After John Barry's "Goldfinger")
23. Theme from Stuart Saves His Family ("What Makes a Family")

The theme song, John Mayer's "Say", is not included on the Bucket List soundtrack, but included on the re-release of Mayer's third album Continuum.

== Home media ==
The film was released on DVD and Blu-ray on June 10, 2008.

== See also ==
- Hawks
