= Open House (2010 film) =

- Film poster
- Directed by: Andrew Paquin
- Written by: Andrew Paquin
- Produced by: Amir Cyrus Ahanchian (EP); Barry Brooker; Sriram Das
- Starring: Brian Geraghty; Rachel Blanchard; Tricia Helfer; Stephen Moyer; Anna Paquin
- Cinematography: Joseph White
- Edited by: Tim Mirkovich
- Music by: Nathan Barr
- Production company: StoneBrook Entertainment
- Distributed by: Lionsgate Entertainment
- Release date: April 24, 2010 (Tribeca)
- Running time: 88 minutes
- Country: United States
- Language: English

Open House is a 2010 thriller film directed by Andrew Paquin. Was screened at the 2010 Tribeca Film Festival. It was released on DVD in August 2010 in the United States by Lionsgate.

The film features a cameo by the director's sister Anna Paquin and her husband Stephen Moyer.

== Plot ==
The film begins as real estate agent Carl (Gabriel Olds) hosts an open house. As Carl finishes with the last couple viewing the house, a man arrives and watches Carl briefly before hiding in the basement. Carl checks the basement but does not see anyone. Alice (Rachel Blanchard) returns home after a run. Carl reveals that it has been tough to interest buyers in the house.

That night, Alice has some friends over for dinner, including Jennie (Anna Paquin). Alice confides in Jennie that her ex-husband Josh (Stephen Moyer) thinks she is being overemotional by selling their house. Alice falls asleep and wakes up in the middle of the night. She notices that Jennie's car is in the driveway. So, Alice looks for Jennie in the house, only to find her corpse in the garage with her throat slashed. As she screams, someone emerges from a crawlspace behind Alice and grabs her.

The next day, Lila (Tricia Helfer) arrives at the house and is greeted by David (Brian Geraghty), who has chained Alice into the crawlspace. Lila approves of their new house, and announces that it is now home. David sets up a video camera in an upstairs window as Lila relaxes in the hot tub. Josh arrives at the house to retrieve his golf clubs and is surprised to find Lila in the hot tub. She explains that she is housesitting and seduces Josh. David films their encounter, and when Lila is ready to climax, he retrieves a kitchen knife. David gives the knife to Lila, and she stabs Josh in the neck, leaving David to clean up the body.

During the day, Lila disappears, while David maintains the house. He lets Alice out of the crawlspace to eat and use the bathroom. Eventually, he warns Alice that Lila would kill her if she knew that Alice was still alive. David lets Alice sit with him while he works at his computer, but he is always careful to stash her back in the crawlspace before Lila gets home. One day, when a pair of housecleaners arrive unexpectedly, David kills them.

Lila and David host a dinner party with two couples. During the dinner party, Lila reveals that David is writing a children's story. As she describes the plot of the story, it becomes clear that she and David are twins. After one couple leaves, Lila seduces the woman in the second couple. As the man joins the two of them in a ménage à trois, David sets up the video camera. He gets a kitchen knife and goes into the bedroom, where the couple start screaming.

During their days together, Alice grows more and more convinced that David is an unwilling partner in his murderous relationship with Lila. She convinces David that they can run away together. Meanwhile, she secretly grabs a small kitchen knife and takes it with her to the crawlspace.

One day, Lila pretends to be a potential buyer of the house and lets Carl take her on a tour. In the bedroom, she tries to seduce Carl, but he hears David hiding in the bathroom. She quickly slashes his throat and orders David to clean up the body before the blood soaks through the floor to the ceiling in the living room.

David tells Lila that all the bodies they have accumulated are starting to rot and that they will have to leave the house soon. As they prepare to leave, David packs a suitcase filled with his belongings and some clothes for Alice. When Lila discovers the suitcase, she marches to the garage and checks all the coolers where David has stored the bodies, looking for Alice. Not seeing her corpse, Lila looks for Alice. When she puts her eye up to a hole in the crawlspace door, Alice stabs Lila with her knife. The two struggle, but Alice overpowers the severely wounded Lila.

When one of Alice's friends arrives at the house to check on her, he sees the blood from Lila's wounds and discovers the panicked Alice in chains. He tries to cut through her chains with a hacksaw. When he goes upstairs to call 911, David kills him, but not before the dispatcher indicates the police are on the way.

David rushes downstairs to find Alice holding her knife to Lila's neck. She threatens to kill Lila unless David releases her. Instead, David offers to assist Alice with slashing Lila's neck, believing it to be the only way that he will be able to leave with Alice alongside him. Lila, however, then manages to stab Alice in the chest as both she and David are forced to flee whilst Alice lies wounded, but still clinging to life, on the floor, with the sound of sirens approaching. The film finally closes as Lila tours yet another new house before declaring to the realtor that it already feels like home.

== Reception ==
On Slant Magazine, André Schenker wrote that the film is "free of subtext as it is of narrative tension or general interest, Open House devolves into little more than a stale gorefest, enlivened only ever so slightly by the familial and sexual ambiguities of the central couple’s relations."

In his review for Fearnet, Scott Weinberg gave it a 3/5 rating saying that "there's something about an ugly presence in a beautiful setting that's just sort of ... interesting." On Dread Central, Debi Moore wrote that "he [Andrew Paquin] doesn’t reinvent the wheel here, but he does craft a very competent and satisfactory slow burner of a home invasion tale that shows off his keen eye."

== See also ==
- List of American films of 2010
- List of thriller films of the 2010s
