= Patricia Rae =

American actress

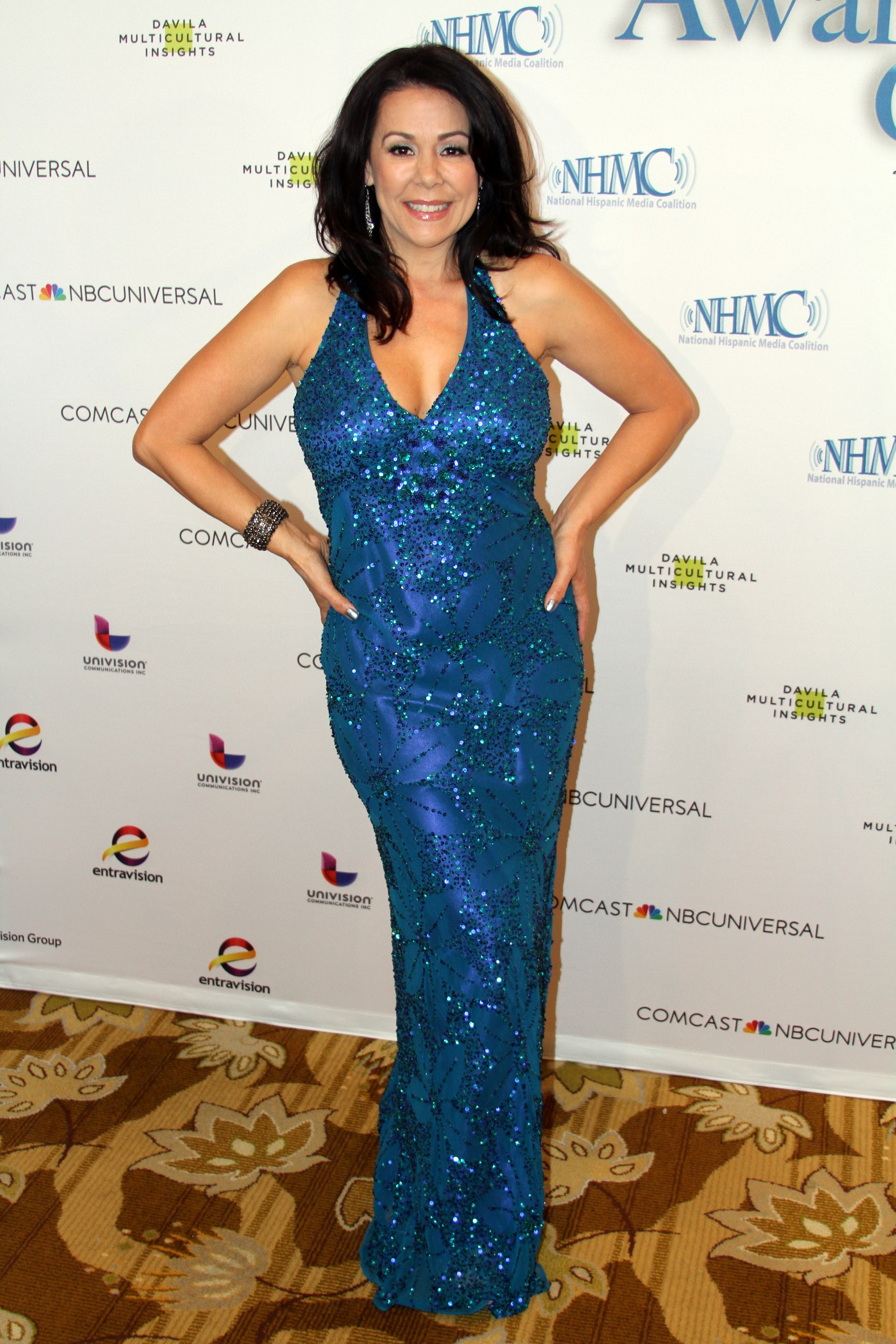
- Rae at the National Hispanic Media Coalition's 16th Annual Impact Awards Gala
- Born: April 9, 1965 (age 61); Manhattan, New York City, U.S.
- Occupation: Actress
- Children: 1

Patricia Rae (born April 9, 1965) is an American actress.

== Early life and work ==
Rae, who is of Colombian ancestry, was born in Manhattan and spent her childhood in Queens. As a child, Rae spoke only Spanish at home, but learned to speak English by watching Sesame Street while she was in kindergarten. Rae was a very precocious child, quite talkative, and used her humor to deflect bad behavior. Two of her main influences growing up were Carol Burnett and Lucille Ball.

Rae's journey into the acting world began in elementary school. While in fourth grade, the drama teacher noticed her and recommended she be in the musical "Oliver Twist". She moved to Florida in her teens where she resumed her scholastic activities, and with the support of the Drama club, was able to find a successful and comfortable niche in acting. Rae earned a series of awards in regional and statewide competitions with her drama troupe. Rae went on to study at the prestigious Lee Strasberg Theatre and Film Institute.

Rae worked for well over two decades, knocking on doors and dedicating herself completely to her craft before seeing any success in her acting career. Rae lived much of her professional life on the East Coast where she worked in theatre, commercials, sketch comedy, independent film and TV. Her first experience on a film set came with her first professional job securing a co-starring role opposite Don Johnson in the (1984–1990) hit TV series "Miami Vice".

After years spent in New York, Rae moved her family from New York to Los Angeles in search of that "breakthrough" role, landing that role of a lifetime in Maria Full of Grace. Her performance as Carla, a pregnant Colombian woman living in a tiny apartment in New York with her family, earned Rae a prestigious Imagen Awards nomination for Best Supporting Role.

== Career ==
=== Film ===
Rae's first two film appearances were in the 2002 movies Swimfan and Nightstalker. Rae landed her first Spanish speaking role in the 2003 movie Maria Full of Grace, which earned her an Imagen Awards nomination for Best Supporting Role. Her next two appearances came in the 2004 movie "Cut Off" & the 2006 movie "Midnight Clear". In 2007 Rae appeared in two more films, "Driftwood" & "Crazy". In 2008 Rae appeared in another two films, "Chasing the Green" & P.J., where Rae was nominated for 'Best Supporting Actress in a Feature', for her role of Shelly, at the July 25–31, 2008 Action on Film International Film Festival. In 2009 she had a small part as Maria in the movie "Dozers". Rae had a busy 2010, appearing in four films that year: Las Angeles, where she played Linda; American Flyer, where she played the role of Maria; Caged Animal, where she played an attorney; and Silverlake Video: The Movie, where she not only played the provocative role of Vikki, but also produced the film. Beginning in 2011 Rae has appeared in the following three films: Detachment, where she played Ms. Estrada; Tamale Lesson (Video Short), playing Blanca, and her biggest role to date, in the 2013 movie The Big Wedding, where she plays Madonna Soto, the biological Colombian mother of Alejandro Griffin (Ben Barnes).

=== Television ===
Rae has appeared on the small screen in several hit television series including Miami Vice, Chuck, The Mentalist, Third Watch, The Closer, Law & Order, Law & Order: Criminal Intent, Life and Heartland. Her first recurring role on TV was on Chuck, playing Bolonia Grimes, Morgan grimes' mother, and girlfriend to Big Mike. She also had recurring roles on The Chicago Code and on New York News, starring Mary Tyler Moore, but the show was canceled before she returned to the show. Rae had a recurring role on the CBS comedy New York News, and made brief cameo appearances in the following television shows; Law & Order: Special Victims Unit, Alias, Malcolm in the Middle and Zeke and Lutherand, where she played a tango instructor with her own school (Ms. Cordova's School of Dance).

=== Stage ===
Rae's stage credits include the one-woman show 'Under Construction', which was a one-woman show, that Rae wrote, based loosely on her childhood. 'The Making of Patricia Rae', which premiered at the 'Stella Adler Conservatory' in 'New York', 'Zoraida', 'Mickey & Roger', 'Late One Sunday Night', 'Latin Lives', 'Faade', 'Does a Tiger Wear a Necktie', and 'The Seagull'. Rae is a member of the Elephant Theatre Company in Los Angeles, where she won a BackStage West Garland Award in 2008 for best ensemble performance in "In Arabia we'd all Be Kings" produced at The Elephant Theater.

== Personal life ==
Rae currently resides in Los Angeles. She is an accredited Power Flow Yoga teacher in Studio City, California.

== Filmography ==
=== Film ===
Year	Title	Role	Notes
2002	Swimfan	Jake's Nurse	
2002	Nightstalker	Teenager's Mother	
2003	Maria Full of Grace	Carla	First Spanish speaking role
2004	Cut Off	Val	
2006	Midnight Clear	Samantha	
2007	Driftwood	Carla Alvarez	
2007	Crazy	Patty	
2008	Chasing the Green	Mona Beads	
2008	Heaven's Messenger	Shelly	
2009	Dozers	Maria	
2010	Las Angeles	Linda	
2010	American Flyer	Maria	
2010	Silverlake Video: The Movie	Vikki	
2010	Caged Animal	Lawyer	
2011	Detachment	Ms. Estrada	
2011	Tamale Lesson	Blanca	
2013	The Big Wedding	Madonna Soto	
2015	Bloodsucking Bastards	Sofia	
2017	Big Bear	Waitress	

=== Television ===
Year	Title	Role	Notes
1986	Miami Vice	Sally	Episode: "Florence Italy"
1995	New York News	Ghetto Mom	Episode: "Good-Bye Gator"
1997	Law & Order	Claudia	Episode: "Harvest"
1999	Third Watch	Mother	Episode: "Hell Is What You Make of It"
2000	Law & Order: Special Victims Unit	Sonia Paredes	Episode: "Baby Killer"
2001	Law & Order: Criminal Intent	Tia	Episode: "Jones"
2003	Malcolm in the Middle	Ranch Hand's Wife	Episode: "Academic Octathalon"
2003	Alias	Young Girl's Mother	Episode: "Reunion"
2007	Heartland	Emily Diaz-Turner	Episode: "The Places You'll Go"
2008	The Closer	Mrs. Guzman	Episode: "Sudden Death"
2008	Life	Stella Horta	Episode: "Everything... All the Time"
2009	Chuck	Bolonia Grimes	Episodes: "Chuck Versus the Ring", "Chuck Versus the Predator", "Chuck Versus the Suburbs"
2010	Zeke and Luther	Miss Cordova	Episode: "Crouching Zeke, Dancing Luther"
2011	The Chicago Code	Gloria Betz	Episode: "Hog Butcher"
2011	The Mentalist	Esther	Episode: "Bloodhounds"
2012	Blue Bloods	Mrs. Ortiz	Episode: "Parenthood"
2019–2023	All Rise	Judge Abigail Delgado	18 episodes
