= One Chance (film) =

2013 British biographical film

- Theatrical release poster
- Directed by: David Frankel
- Written by: Justin Zackham
- Produced by: Simon Cowell; Michael Menchel; Krys Thykier; Brad Weston
- Starring: James Corden; Alexandra Roach; Mackenzie Crook; Colm Meaney; Julie Walters
- Cinematography: Florian Ballhaus
- Edited by: Wendy Greene Bricmont
- Music by: Theodore Shapiro
- Production companies: The Weinstein Company; Syco Entertainment
- Distributed by: Entertainment Film Distributors
- Release dates: 9 September 2013 (TIFF); 25 October 2013
- Running time: 103 minutes
- Country: United Kingdom
- Language: English
- Budget: $12 million
- Box office: $10.9 million

One Chance is a 2013 British biographical film about opera singer and Britain's Got Talent winner Paul Potts, directed by David Frankel and written by Justin Zackham. It was screened in the Special Presentation section at the 2013 Toronto International Film Festival.

== Cast ==
- James Corden as Paul Potts
  - Christopher Bull as Young Paul (Age 9)
  - Ewan Austin as Young Paul (Age 14)
- Alexandra Roach as Julz, Paul's wife
- Mackenzie Crook as Braddon, Paul's coworker at The Carphone Warehouse
- Valeria Bilello as Alessandra
- Colm Meaney as Roland, Paul's father
- Julie Walters as Yvonne, Paul's mother
- Trystan Gravelle as Matthew, Paul's lifelong bully
  - Ieuan Heinz Chakrabarti-Adams as Young Matthew (Age 9)
  - Rhys Coxley as Young Matthew (Age 14)
- Sion Tudor Owen as Choirmaster, Paul's mentor
- Jemima Rooper as Hydrangea, Braddon's girlfriend
- Alex Macqueen as Dr. Thorpe, Paul's emergency physician

The film also features archival footage of Simon Cowell, Amanda Holden, Piers Morgan, and Ant & Dec from Britain's Got Talent.

== Production ==
The screenplay was written by Justin Zackham based on the life of Britain's Got Talent winner Paul Potts. Simon Cowell, who was one of the judges in the show and who helped Potts win the competition, served as one of the producers of the film along with Michael Menchel, Krys Thykier and Brad Weston. Producers Harvey Weinstein and Bob Weinstein immediately agreed to co-produce and finance the film after liking the script, and director David Frankel reduced his directing fee of US$6 million to US$1.2 million in exchange for a larger share of the film's gross.

James Corden was chosen to reprise Potts, who also wanted to sing for the role and trained with a singing teacher with multiple lessons. Further, some of the producers came to witness him singing but after recording half of a song, they realized it would not work and go ahead with someone else. Later Potts himself served as the singing voice for Corden matching the overdub onscreen. Corden admitted that Potts decided to distance himself from the film, "in a nice way" adding "we were making the film of a man's life that we never saw, you know. The moment that the film stops is the moment that we ever had any awareness of [Paul] existing. So I think the only thing that I know that [Paul] said to people is that he didn't want it to be a tale of just woe and sadness… he wanted it to have a lightness of touch to it."

One Chance was shot in Italy and the United Kingdom. Filming continued for seven weeks before being wrapped in November 2012.

== Release ==
One Chance was premiered at the 2013 Toronto International Film Festival as a "special presentation" on 9 September 2013. It was released in cinemas on 25 October 2013.

== Reception ==
As of October 2021 it holds an approval rating of 63% on Rotten Tomatoes, based on 59 reviews, with an average rating of 5.5/10; the consensus states: "Predictable and sentimental, yet thoroughly agreeable, One Chance is an unapologetic crowd-pleaser that achieves its admittedly modest goals." On Metacritic, the film has a score of 49 out of 100 based on reviews from 12 critics, indicating "mixed or average reviews".

Peter Bradshaw of The Guardian wrote "Like Slumdog Millionaire, it's a film in which a British TV show has a starring role, and perhaps in the future every small-screen franchise product will get its own movie deal. But happy endings can be illusory in this business. Ken Loach should now be drafted in to tell the story of Steve Brookstein, who won The X-Factor in 2004 but went back to singing on P&O Ferries and in branches of Caffè Nero." Christy Lemire of RogerEbert.com wrote "This workmanlike underdog tale from director David Frankel is winning nonetheless, mostly thanks to an irresistible lead performance from James Corden". Ben Kenigsberg of The New York Times stated, "The appealing Mr. Corden manages the not insignificant task of maintaining interest in a story whose climax has already been passed around on YouTube. The real Mr. Potts supplies his singing voice in moments that are distractingly dubbed. “One Chance” is a slick, salesmanlike package." Geoffrey Macnab of The Independent wrote "Potts, played as a "lovely big fatty" by James Corden, has a fatalistic approach to life. But, as you'd expect from the director of The Devil Wears Prada, the film doesn't go in for gritty Ken Loach-like realism in its portrayal of South Wales."

Anthony Kaufman of Screen International wrote "One could fault the filmmaking team for employing such likeable archetypes and polished elements, from its smooth production values to its formulaic structure. But ultimately, the movie accomplishes exactly what it sets out to do as a feel-good entertainment. One Chance doesn't blow its opportunity." Michael O'Sullivan of The Washington Post wrote "There's never really terribly much at stake here, except the success of one chubby nerd with dreams of nailing Puccini's “Nessun dorma.” But maybe that dream is enough." Tim Robey of The Daily Telegraph wrote "the film mainly exists for one reason: it's a star vehicle tailored for James Corden. Watching [him] lip-synch to Nessun Dorma is an instant litmus test for how you'll respond to this. Only a blocked nose could fail to detect an unavoidable whiff of cheese, but the script is sparkier than you might expect for something written by Justin Zackham, and Corden barrels into the role with guts, at least."

Complimenting the cinematography, Scott Foundas of Variety wrote "Bright, widescreen lensing by Florian Ballhaus has the effect of giving everything a picture-postcard sheen, even the supposedly soul-crushing Port Talbot steelworks." David Rooney of The Hollywood Reporter admitted that "It provides a picture-postcardy centerpiece, with splendid views of the Grand Canal and Piazza San Marco courtesy of Frankel's regular cinematographer Florian Ballhaus. But the Italian interlude strikes some minor false notes, and the film works best on home ground."

Francesca Rudkin of The New Zealand Herald wrote "If you're hoping for more spine-tingling moments such as Nessun Dorma, you may be disappointed. The famous audition is the one and only truly affecting scene; as eyewatering as watching it on YouTube for the first time." Nigel Andrews of Financial Times wrote "James Corden is robustly likeable and, when needed, emotionally flibbertigibbet. Unimaginable that anyone could play the role better. By contrast the casting of Julie Billy Elliot Walters as Paul's go-for-it mum merely proves that the makers' imagination didn't stretch far, elsewhere, beyond the typecasting Rolodex." Zeba Blay of Digital Spy wrote "One Chance avoids some of the pitfalls of the genre by having a funny if calculable script, a great supporting cast, and a very strong and engaging lead in Corden. If you need more out of your reality television star biopics, it would be better to go elsewhere." R. Kurt Oselund of Slant Magazine wrote "In One Chance, like Prada before it, Frankel crams his story with predictable developments, yet he matches his subject in spirit, pushing something into the spotlight that, however unlikely, elicits irresistible glee."

== Soundtrack ==
One Chance: The Incredible True Story of Paul Potts: Motion Picture Soundtrack

Soundtrack album by Various Artists
- Released: 21 October 2013
- Genre: Classical; Pop
- Length: 54:04
- Label: Sony Music; Big Machine
- Producer: Taylor Swift; Jack Antonoff

The soundtrack was released in the United Kingdom on 21 October 2013. It was released in the United States the next day via digital download with two extra tracks by The London Session Orchestra, a CD was released on 7 January 2014. It was scored by Theodore Shapiro. "Sweeter than Fiction" by Taylor Swift was included on the soundtrack and was released as the lead single on 21 October 2013 by Big Machine Records. The single received a nomination for Best Original Song at the 71st Golden Globe Awards.

No.	Title	Performer(s)	Length
1.	"Nessun dorma"	Paul Potts	2:52
2.	"Nella Fantasia"	Potts	4:24
3.	"Vesti la giubba" (from Pagliacci)	Potts	3:26
4.	"E lucevan le stelle"	Potts	3:10
5.	"Ich liebe Dich"	Potts	2:41
6.	"Time to Say Goodbye" (Con te partirò) (2012 Version)	Il Divo	4:21
7.	"I. Allegro con brio" (Mozart: Symphony No. 25 in G Minor, K. 183)	Columbia Symphony Orchestra and Bruno Walter	4:42
8.	"Celeste Aida" (from Aida)	Potts	5:08
9.	"Farewell to Earth" ("O terra addio" from Aida)	Potts and Kylie Watt	1:44
10.	"Introitus Kyrie" (Mozart: Requiem, K. 626) (Remastered)	Bavarian Radio Symphony Orchestra, Colin Davis and Angela Maria Blasi	2:38
11.	"Arrivederci Roma" (in B)	Vittorio Grigolo	3:42
12.	"'O sole mio"	Mario Lanza	2:28
13.	"Che gelida manina" (from La bohème)	Potts	5:38
14.	"O soave fanciulla" (from La bohème)	Potts and Watt	3:15
15.	"Sweeter than Fiction"	Taylor Swift	3:55
Total length:			54:04

US bonus track
No.	Title	Performer(s)	Length
16.	"Moment of Truth"	The London Session Orchestra	1:40
Total length:			55:44

US Amazon.com exclusive bonus track
No.	Title	Performer(s)	Length
17.	"Venice"	The London Session Orchestra	3:29
Total length:			58:13
