= Justin Zackham =

American screenwriter and filmmaker

- Born: December 16, 1970 (age 55); Connecticut, U.S.
- Occupations: Film writer, director, producer
- Years active: 2001-
- Notable work: The Bucket List (2007)

Justin Zackham (born 16 December 1970) is an American and British screenwriter, director and producer. He wrote the films The Bucket List, One Chance, The Big Wedding, and Second Act. He also created the FX TV series Lights Out. Zackham coined the term "bucket list" with his screenplay for the film, inspired by his own "List of Things to do Before I Kick the Bucket", which he shortened to "Justin's Bucket List".

== Education ==
Zackham grew up in Greenwich, Connecticut, United States and also has some British heritage. He graduated from NYU Film School.

== Career ==
After moving to Los Angeles in the 1990s, Zackham wrote and directed the 2001 fraternity comedy Going Greek. He also wrote himself a "List of Things to Do Before I Kick the Bucket", which he shortened to "Justin's Bucket List". The first item on the list was to have a movie made at a major Hollywood studio. Several years later, that list became the idea for a speculative screenplay which he wrote before submitting to producers, nearly all of whom turned him down. The script found its way to Rob Reiner who called Zackham after reading the first ten pages and said he would like it to be his next film, if that was agreeable to Zackham. The Bucket List was distributed by Warner Bros. and starred Jack Nicholson and Morgan Freeman becoming an international hit. In 2012, the term "bucket list" was listed in both Webster's Dictionary and the Oxford English Dictionary.

In 2011, Zackham produced and directed his screenplay, The Big Wedding, featuring Robert De Niro, Diane Keaton, Susan Sarandon, Katherine Heigl, Amanda Seyfried, Topher Grace and Robin Williams. The film was purchased by Lionsgate and was released 26 April 2013.

Zackham also wrote the original screenplay One Chance about the Britain's Got Talent winner Paul Potts. David Frankel directed the film for The Weinstein Company starring the Tony Award-winner James Corden, Julie Walters, Colm Meaney, Mackenzie Crook and Alexandra Roach. It was screened in the Special Presentation section at the 2013 Toronto International Film Festival. The film was shot in Italy and the United Kingdom.

Zackham wrote and produced Second Act for STX Entertainment. The 2018 film starred Jennifer Lopez, along with Leah Remini, Annaleigh Ashford, Vanessa Hudgens, Dan Bucatinsky, Freddie Stroma, Milo Ventimiglia, Treat Williams and Charlyne Yi. The film was directed by Peter Segal.

== TV credits ==
Zackham is the creator and executive producer of the FX drama series Lights Out, about a former heavyweight champion facing bankruptcy and Alzheimer's disease.

He wrote Riverside, a 2007 television pilot, a coming of age semi-autobiographical drama about five men and a girl in their late 20s who have been friends since childhood and who struggle to maintain their tight-knit group in the face of adulthood.

== Filmography ==
Film

Year	Title	Director	Writer	Producer
2001	Going Greek	Yes	Yes	No
2007	The Bucket List	No	Yes	No
2013	The Big Wedding	Yes	Yes	Yes
2013	One Chance	No	Yes	No
2018	Second Act	No	Yes	No

Television

Television by Justin Zackham
Year	Title	Writer	Creator	Note
2011	Lights Out	Yes	Yes	Episode "Pilot"
