= Going Greek =

2001 film by Justin Zackham

- Directed by: Justin Zackham
- Written by: Justin Zackham
- Produced by: Kevin Conlon; Eric Y. Kim
- Starring: Dylan Bruno; Laura Harris; Simon Rex; Dublin James; Chris Owen
- Distributed by: Hart Sharp Video
- Release date: 2001
- Running time: 90 minutes
- Country: United States
- Language: English

Going Greek is a 2001 American comedy film written and directed by Justin Zackham.

== Plot ==
Set in any-college U.S.A., centering on Jake, an embittered ex-high school American football star who is coerced into pledging the "coolest" fraternity on campus. Jake does so in order to protect Gil, his somewhat nerdy, but Greek-obsessed cousin. As the semester progresses, Jake struggles to maintain his grades as well as his affair with Paige, a beautiful sophomore who hates all fraternities. Through naked scavenger hunts, sorority ass-signings, all-night beer fests, keg parties, sorority swapping, and other creative pledge activities, Jake discovers that he's actually beginning to enjoy himself. But when some of the frat brothers step up their attempts to force Gil into quitting the house, both his scholarship and his relationship with Paige are threatened. Jake must swallow his pride and turn to his fellow pledges for help into seeing the big-hearted Gil through to the end, or risk losing everything. Jake quickly learns that no man is an island, and that the friends we make in college are friends for life.

== Cast ==
- Dylan Bruno as Jake
- Laura Harris as Paige
- Simon Rex as Thompson
- Dublin James as Gil
- Chris Owen as Davis
- Steve Monroe as Nick
- Oliver Hudson as Ziegler
- Harvey Silver as T.J.
- Todd Giebenhain as Russ
- Corey Pearson as "Sully"
- Charlie Talbert as Dooly
- Susan Ward as Wendy
- Tom Bower as Bill
- Evan Jones as Stoner Roommate
