= Stephen Moyer =

English actor (born 1969)

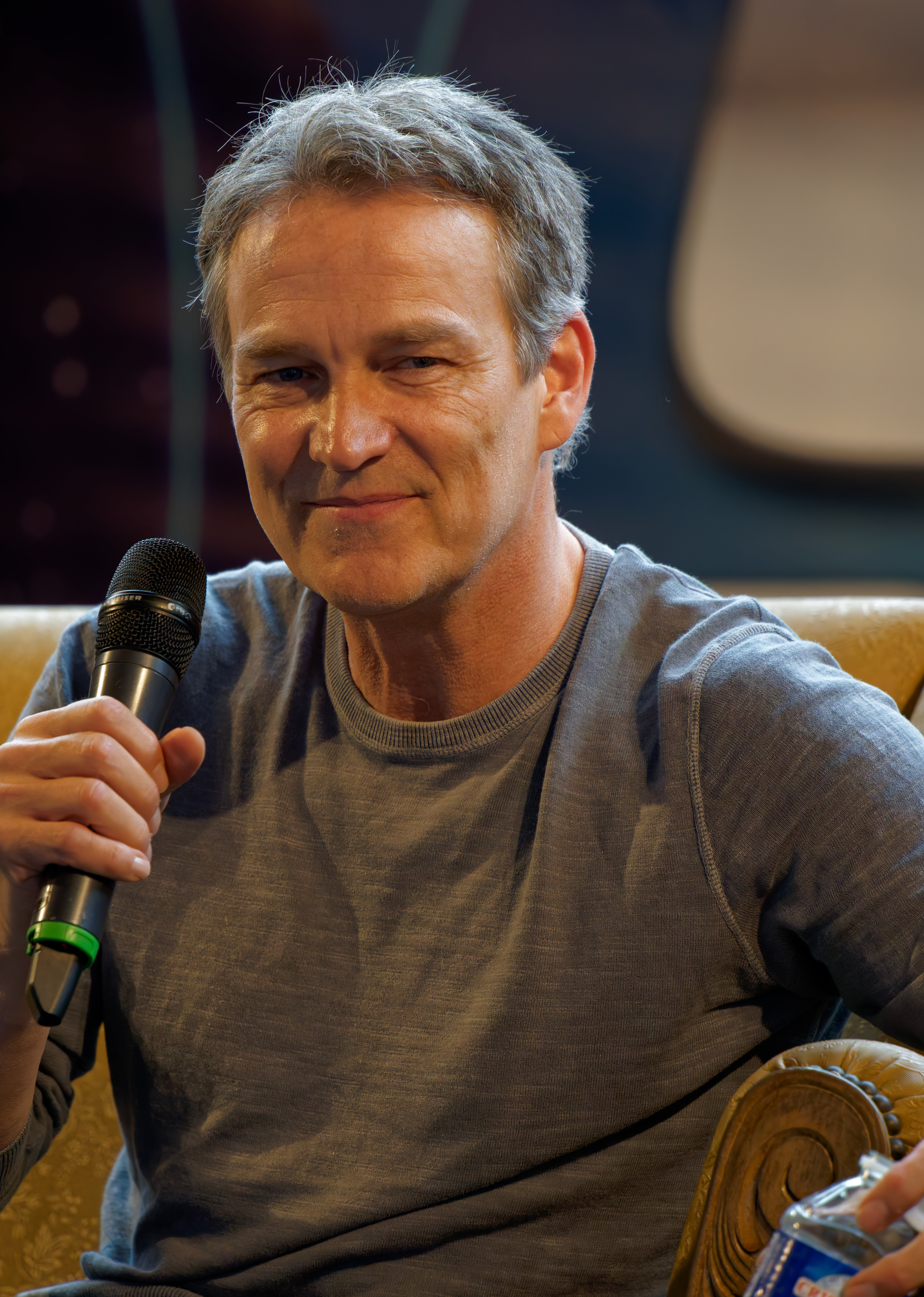
- Moyer in 2024
- Born: Stephen John Emery; 11 October 1969 (age 57); Brentwood, Essex, England
- Education: London Academy of Music and Dramatic Art
- Occupations: Actor, film director
- Years active: 1993–present
- Spouse: Anna Paquin (m. 2010)
- Partner: Lorien Haynes (1999–2006)
- Children: 4

Stephen John Emery (born 11 October 1969), known professionally as Stephen Moyer, is an English actor and film director. He is best known for portraying the vampire Bill Compton in the HBO television series True Blood.

== Early life and career ==
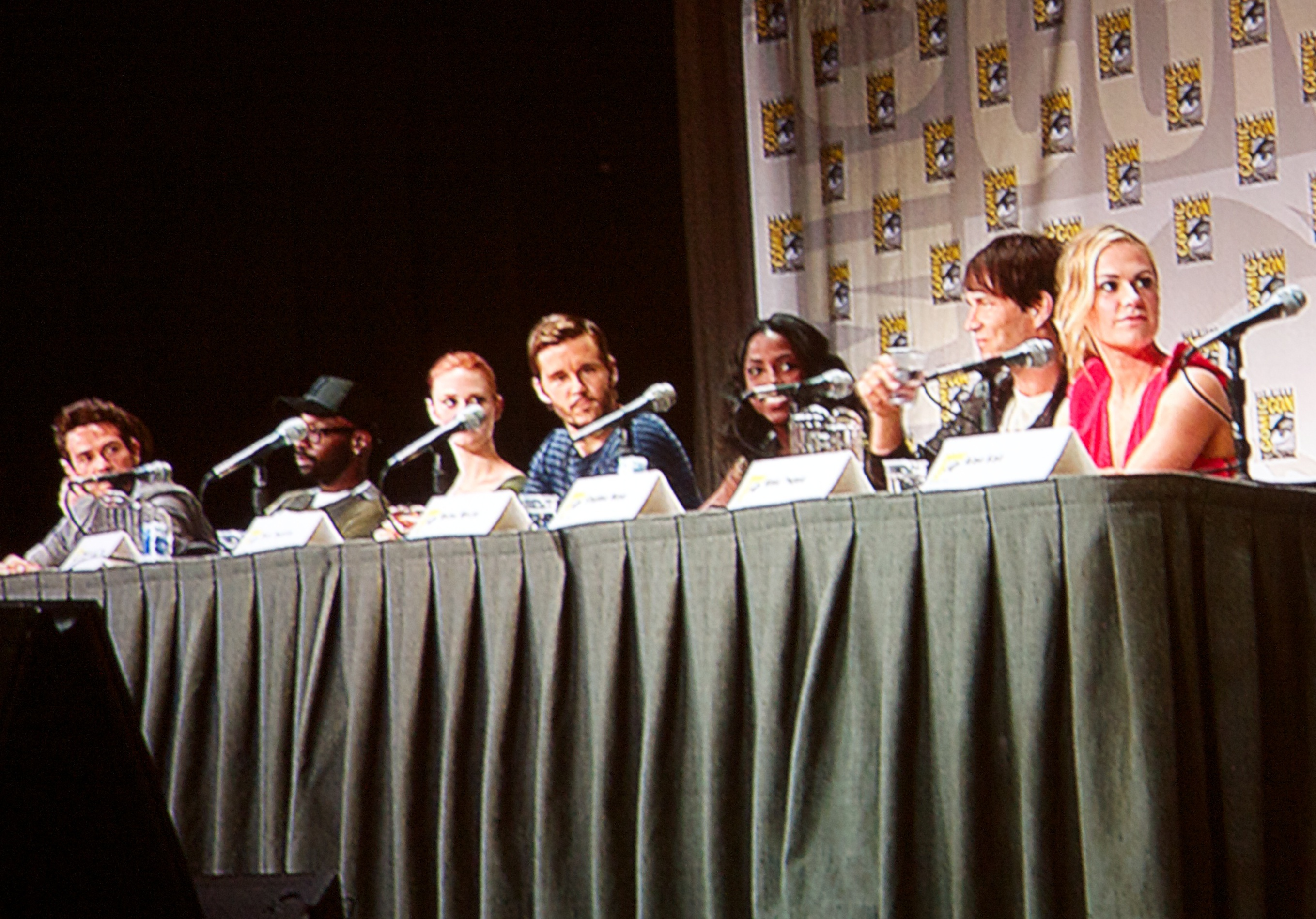
Moyer at 2011 International Comic-Con San Diego with Ryan Kwanten, Deborah Ann Woll, Anna Paquin, Rutina Wesley, and Nelsan Ellis of the TV show True Blood.

Moyer was born in Brentwood, Essex and attended St Martin's, a comprehensive school in Hutton, Essex. He graduated from the London Academy of Music and Dramatic Art (LAMDA).

After graduating from LAMDA, Moyer worked in theatre for five years. He worked with the National Theatre Wales, the Royal Shakespeare Company and the Oxford Stage Company, work which included going on tour and playing Romeo in productions of Romeo and Juliet. He then made the transition to television and film.

In 1997, Moyer made his big-screen debut landing the lead role in the film adaptation of the long-running comic strip Prince Valiant by Hal Foster, working alongside Ron Perlman and Katherine Heigl.

In 2004 he co-starred with Rashida Jones in the transatlantic romantic drama series NY-LON.

In 2007 he was cast opposite Anna Paquin, who played his character's love interest, Sookie Stackhouse, in the HBO series True Blood. The show ran for 7 seasons.

He became Brentwood Theatre's first patron in October 2007, especially supporting their "Reaching Out, Building On" campaign to help fund the 2008 completion of backstage facilities that was supported by True Blood fans from across the world.

== Personal life ==
Moyer has two children from his relationship with journalist Lorien Haynes from 1999 to 2006 — a son named Billy, born in 2000 and a daughter, Lilac, born in 2002.

In 2007, during the filming of the True Blood pilot, Moyer and Anna Paquin began dating. They became engaged in 2009 and married on 21 August 2010 at a private residence in Malibu, California.

Moyer and Paquin have fraternal twins Charlie and Poppy, who were born in 2012.

Moyer has dealt with alcoholism in the past. In 2015, he said that he had been sober for 14 years and that the addiction stemmed from his roots in British theatre, emulating the public images of personal heroes like Peter O'Toole. At a dinner at the CLARE Foundation, a southern California non-profit facility, he stated, "There's this rush that happens from doing our job, this whirring buzz, and you want to continue that buzz." He works with CLARE Foundation to help others with rehabilitation and sobriety.

Moyer is a supporter of West Ham United F.C.

== Filmography ==
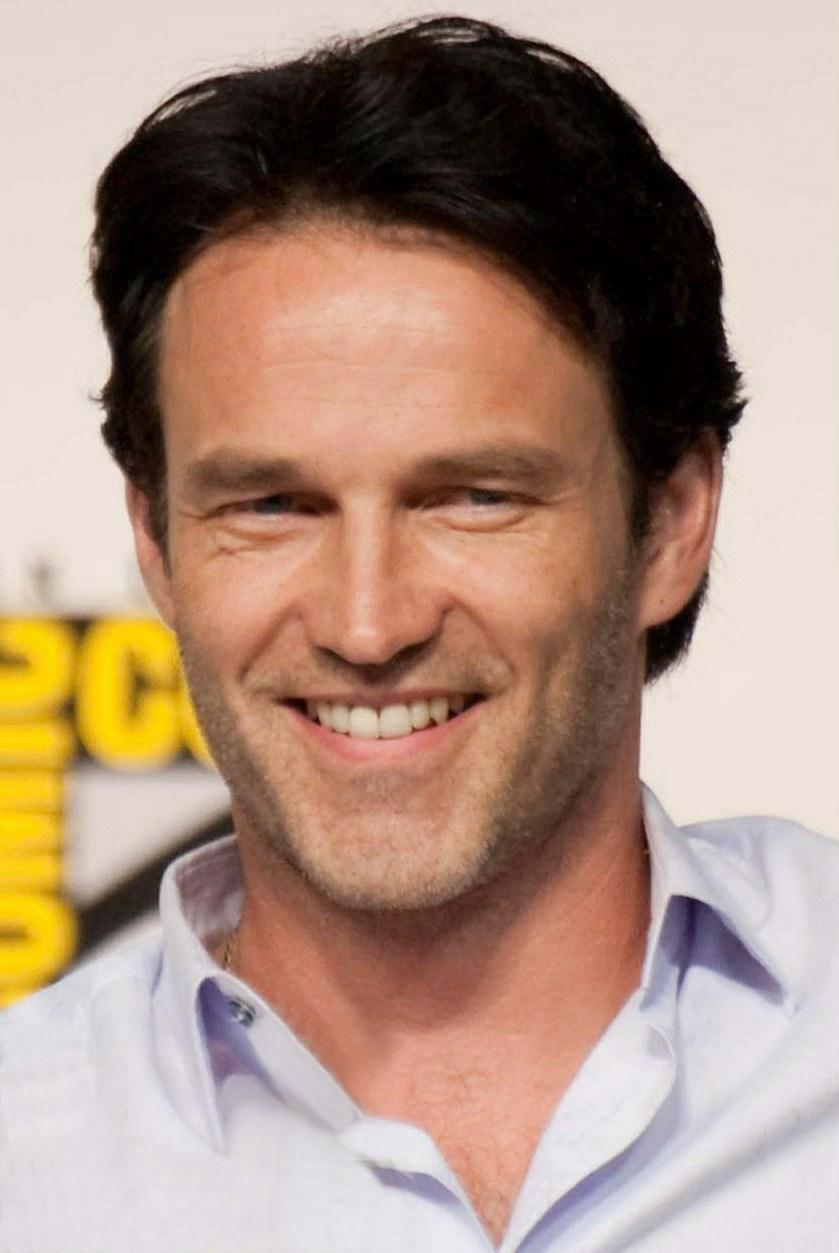
Moyer at ComicCon, 25 July 2009

=== Film ===
Year	Title	Role	Notes
1997	Prince Valiant	Prince Valiant	
1998	Comic Act	Danny	
2000	Quills	Prouix, the Architect	
2001	Men Only	Jason	
2001	Princess of Thieves	Prince Philip	
2003	Trinity	Brach	
2004	Deadlines	Alex Randal	
2005	Undiscovered	Mick Benson	
2007	88 Minutes	Guy LaForge	
2007	Alternate Endings	Editor	
2008	Restraint	Andrew	
2010	Open House	Josh	
2011	Priest	Owen Pace	
2011	The Caller	John Guidi	
2011	The Double	Brutus	
2012	The Barrens	Richard Vineyard	
2013	Evidence	Detective Reese	
2013	Devil's Knot	John Fogleman	
2015	Concussion	Ron Hamilton	
2016	Detour	Vincent	
2017	The Hatton Garden Job	Marcus Ford	
2018	Juveniles	Ben	
2018	The Parting Glass	—N/a	Director and producer
2019	Godzilla: King of the Monsters	Fighter Pilot	Uncredited
2020	G-Loc	Bran	
2021	After We Fell	Christian Vance	
2021	Last Survivors	Troy	
2022	After Ever Happy	Christian Vance	
2023	After Everything	Christian Vance	
2024	A Bit of Light	—N/a	Also director and producer

=== Television ===
Year	Title	Role	Notes
1993–94	Conjugal Rites	Philip Masefield	Main role; 13 episodes
1995	Castles	Martin Franks	16 episodes
1996	Lord of Misrule	Olly	Television film
1996	Cadfael	Godwin	Episode: "A Morbid Taste for Bones"
1997	A Touch of Frost	D.C. Burton	Episode: "Penny for the Guy"
1997	The Grand	Stephen Bannerman	Main role (series 1), 8 episodes
1998	Ultraviolet	Jack Beresford	Episodes: "Habeas Corpus", "Persona Non Grata"
1999	Highlander: The Raven	Jeremy Dexter	Episode: "Thick as Thieves"
1999	Midsomer Murders	Christopher Wainwright	Episode: "Death in Disguise"
1999	Life Support	Tom Scott	[unknown episodes]
1999	Cold Feet	Nick Marsden	Episode 2.5
2000	The Secret	Marcel Birkstead	Television film
2000	Sunburn	Trevor Watts	Episode 2.1
2000	Peak Practice	Chris Rhodes	Episode: "Hit and Run"
2001	Princess of Thieves	Prince Philip	Television film
2001	Men Only	Jason	Television film
2001	Uprising	Simcha "Kazik" Rotem	Television film
2002	Menace	Mark	Television film
2003	Perfect	Mark	Television film
2003	Entrusted	David Quatermain	Television film
2004	NY-LON	Michael Antonioni	Main role, 7 episodes
2004	The Final Quest	Young Danny Duke	Television film
2005	Waking the Dead	Steven Hunt	Episodes: "Undertow” Parts 1&2
2006	Casualty	Mark Ellis	Episode: "Waste of Space"
2007	Lilies	Mr Brazendale	Main role; 8 episodes
2007	The Starter Wife	Sam	Television miniseries
2007	Empathy	Jimmy Collins	Television film
2008–14	True Blood	Bill Compton	Main role; 80 episodes
2010	Phineas and Ferb	Jared	Voice role; episode: "The Curse of Candace"
2011	Ice	Simon Peterson	Television miniseries
2012	Jan	Gery	15 episodes
2013	The Sound of Music Live!	Georg von Trapp	Live television special
2015	Killing Jesus	Pontius Pilate	Television film
2015	The Bastard Executioner	Milus Corbett	Main role
2017	Shots Fired	Officer Calvert Breeland	Main role
2017	Safe House	Tom Brook	Main role
2017–19	The Gifted	Reed Strucker	Lead role; 29 episodes
2020	Fortunate Son	Vern Lang	8 episodes
2024	Sexy Beast	Teddy Bass	Main Cast
2024	Elsbeth	Alex Modarian	season 1 episode 1 "Pilot"
2025	Elsbeth	Alex Modarian	season 2 episode 20 "Ramen Holiday"
2025	Art Detectives	DI Mick Palmer	Lead role; 6 episodes
2025	The Forsytes	Jolyon Forsyte Senior	Main Cast
2026	The Night Agent	The Father	Main role (season 3)

=== Theatre ===
Year	Title	Role	Location
2013	Chicago	Billy Flynn	Hollywood Bowl
2024	Macbeth	Macbeth	Off-Broadway

== Awards ==
Year	Nominated work	Award	Category	Result
2009	True Blood	Satellite Award	Best TV Ensemble	Won
2009	True Blood	Scream Award	Best Actor in a Horror Movie or TV Show	Won
2009	True Blood	Teen Choice Award	Choice Summer TV Star: Male	Nominated
2010	True Blood	Saturn Award	Best Actor in Television	Nominated
2010	True Blood	Teen Choice Award	Choice Summer TV Star: Male	Nominated
2010	True Blood	Scream Award	Best Horror Actor	Nominated
2010	True Blood	Scream Award	Holy Sh*t! Scene of the Year	Won
2010	True Blood	Satellite Award	Best Actor in a TV Drama Series	Nominated
2011	True Blood	Saturn Award	Best Actor in Television	Won
2011	True Blood	Scream Award	Best Horror Actor	Nominated
