= The Big Wedding =

2013 American romantic comedy directed by Justin Zackham

- Theatrical release poster
- Directed by: Justin Zackham
- Screenplay by: Justin Zackham
- Based on: Mon frère se marie by Jean-Stéphane Bron and Karine Sudan
- Produced by: Justin Zackham; Anthony Katagas; Clay Pecorin; Richard Salvatore; Harry J. Ufland
- Starring: Robert De Niro; Katherine Heigl; Diane Keaton; Amanda Seyfried; Topher Grace; Susan Sarandon; Robin Williams; Ben Barnes; Christine Ebersole; David Rasche; Patricia Rae; Ana Ayora
- Cinematography: Jonathan Brown
- Edited by: Jon Corn
- Music by: Nathan Barr
- Production companies: Two Ton Films; Millennium Films
- Distributed by: Lionsgate
- Release date: April 26, 2013
- Running time: 89 minutes
- Country: United States
- Language: English
- Budget: $35 million
- Box office: $46.5 million

The Big Wedding is a 2013 American comedy film written and directed by Justin Zackham. It is an American remake of the original 2006 Swiss-French film Mon frère se marie (My Brother Is Getting Married), written by Jean-Stéphane Bron and Karine Sudan.

The film stars an ensemble cast that includes Robert De Niro, Katherine Heigl, Diane Keaton, Amanda Seyfried, Topher Grace, Ben Barnes, Susan Sarandon and Robin Williams. It was released in the United States and Canada on April 26, 2013, by Lionsgate. The Big Wedding was panned by critics upon release and underperformed at the box office.

== Plot ==
Don and Ellie Griffin were a New England couple married for 20 years before they divorced. They have three children from their marriage: Lyla, Jared and adopted son Alejandro, who originates from Colombia.

In preparation for Alejandro's wedding, Ellie arrives at Don's (and her old) home and lets herself in. She interrupts Don just as he is about to perform oral sex on Bebe, his girlfriend of eight years (and Ellie's former best friend). All are embarrassed, but they make small talk and he shows Ellie to her room.

Meanwhile, Alejandro and his fiancée Missy are meeting with Father Moinighan, the priest who will be marrying them. It is revealed that his biological mother Madonna is going to be coming from Colombia to the wedding, which upsets him because he does not have a "traditional" family, and it is believed that his Catholic mother will not approve of that nor the fact that Don and Ellie are divorced.

Lyla, who reveals that she is separated, goes to the hospital and, after passing out briefly, sees Jared, an obstetrician. They talk and it is revealed that he is a virgin and is waiting for the "right one".

Back home, Alejandro tells Ellie that his mother is coming to the wedding. Explaining that, as she is a devout Catholic and does not believe in divorce, Alejandro asks Ellie and Don to pretend to be married for the next three days. Hearing this, Bebe becomes upset with Don and leaves the house. Madonna arrives with Alejandro's biological 20-year-old sister Nuria. Nuria flirts with Jared after she brazenly strips naked to skinnydip in the family's lake.

That evening, the family goes out to dinner with Missy and her bigoted parents Muffin and Barry, and Bebe shows up as their waitress, which surprises everyone. Meanwhile, Nuria starts fondling Jared under the table, and Ellie sees Nuria giving Jared a handjob. She takes Nuria to the restroom for a chat, telling her that American women are not as forward and desire romance before having sex.

When they arrive home, Jared tells Nuria that he wants to have sex, as she had suggested earlier, but she tells him no, asking him instead to do romantic things for her, such as read her poetry. Don and Ellie, meanwhile, end up having sex when Ellie, still pretending to be Don's wife, sleeps in his room.

Ellie and Madonna go for a walk in the woods and talk. Neither understands the other's language, although they think they are communicating on some level. At the same time, Don and Lyla talk privately, and she reveals that she is pregnant.

On the wedding day, before the ceremony, Don tells Bebe that he had sex with Ellie. Although Bebe says that she forgives them, she still punches him in the face. She also reveals that Ellie cheated on Don with Missy's father before Don cheated on her. Muffin says that she knows about Ellie and Barry, and tells them that she is bisexual, implying that she is interested in a sexual affair with both Bebe and Ellie.

Meanwhile, Missy and Alejandro end up getting married on the family dock alone to escape the chaos. The family runs after them and, after some of them fall into the lake, the wedding reception takes place. Jared goes upstairs to talk with Nuria, who tells him that she has decided to no longer follow Ellie's advice about being not so sexually available, and they sleep together.

Back at the reception, Ellie and Bebe have made up. Don surprises Bebe by proposing to her, and they get married on the spot. Lyla's estranged husband Andrew arrives at the wedding and, after finding out that she is pregnant, reconciles with her. Madonna realizes that she has been lied to about his family, and he runs after her as she starts to leave. But she reveals that her own past was not as pure as he thought, that she too had lied to protect him, and she forgives him.

Some time passes and it is revealed that Lyla has had a daughter named Jane, as Don attaches a plaque with her name to their family tree.

== Cast ==
- Ben Barnes as Alejandro Soto Griffin
- Amanda Seyfried as Melissa "Missy" O'Connor, Alejandro's fiancée
- Robert De Niro as Donald Robert "Don" Griffin, Alejandro's adoptive father
- Diane Keaton as Eleanor "Ellie" Griffin, Alejandro's adoptive mother
- Katherine Heigl as Lyla Griffin, Alejandro's adoptive older sister
- Topher Grace as Jared Griffin, Alejandro's adoptive older brother
- Susan Sarandon as Beatrice Martha "Bebe" McBride
- Robin Williams as Father Bill Moinighan
- Christine Ebersole as Muffin O'Connor, Missy's mother
- David Rasche as Barry O'Connor, Missy's father
- Patricia Rae as Madonna Soto, Alejandro's biological mother
- Ana Ayora as Nuria Soto, Alejandro's biological younger sister
- Kyle Bornheimer as Andrew, Lyla's husband
- Megan Ketch as Jane, nurse at Jared's hospital
- Christa Campbell as Kim

== Production ==
The film was originally to be titled The Wedding. It is an American remake of the original 2006 French film, Mon frère se marie (My Brother Is Getting Married), which was written by Jean-Stéphane Bron and Karine Sudan.

Principal photography took place during summer 2011 in Greenwich, Connecticut. Locations included St. Agnes Church, Christ Church, Gabriele's Italian Steakhouse, and a private home in the town's Stanwich section.

Director Justin Zackham and producer Clay Pecorin appeared on a Season 6 episode of TLC's Cake Boss. They ordered the wedding cake for the film from Buddy Valastro at Carlo's Bakery in Hoboken, New Jersey.

Referring to the scene in which her character jumps naked into a lake, Ana Ayora said, "There was definitely a little bit of anxiousness, but that was Nuria. Nuria wouldn't hesitate, so I didn't hesitate."

== Reception ==
The film was panned by critics. The Big Wedding holds a 7% rating on Rotten Tomatoes, based on 106 reviews, with an average rating of 3.2/10. The website's critical consensus states, "The Big Wedding's all-star cast is stranded in a contrived, strained plot that features broad stabs at humor but few laughs." On Metacritic, the film has a score of 28/100, based on reviews from 32 critics, indicating "generally unfavorable" reviews. One observer pointed out that The Big Wedding's reviews are among the worst of the year. Audiences polled by CinemaScore gave the film an average grade of "C+" on a scale of A+ to F.

According to Business Insider, the movie "was a massive flop at theaters" but recouped its production costs by a few million dollars. It opened with box-office receipts of $7.5 million at 2,633 North American locations, leading one observer to state, "Expect domestic exhibitors to file for divorce in the very near future". C. S. Strowbridge of The Numbers stated, "There's little reason to suspect it will stick around any longer than theater owners are contractually obligated to keep it."

Heigl was nominated for Worst Supporting Actress at the 34th Golden Raspberry Awards in 2013, where she lost to Kim Kardashian for Temptation: Confessions of a Marriage Counselor.
