= Armond Lebowitz =

American film editor

- Born: September 25, 1926
- Died: April 30, 2015 (aged 88); Thousand Oaks, California
- Occupation: Film editor

Armond Lebowitz (25 September 1926 – 30 April 2015) was an American film editor. He worked in many films by Larry Cohen, such as Q - The Winged Serpent (1982) and Perfect Strangers (1984). He also edited Ladybug Ladybug (1963), Too Many Thieves (1966), The Incident (1967), and A Midsummer Night's Dream (1967).

== Filmography ==
- The Ambulance (1990)
- A Return to Salem's Lot (1987)
- The Stuff (1985)
- Special Effects (1984)
- Tales of the Unexpected (1982-1984)
- Perfect Strangers (1984)
- Chiefs (1983)
- Q (1982)
- Full Moon High (1981)
- See China and Die (1981)
- Angel and Big Joe (1975)
- The Incident (1967)
- A Midsummer Night's Dream (1967)
- Too Many Thieves (1966)
- For the People (1965)
- Ladybug Ladybug (1963)
- Satan in High Heels (1962)

== Bibliography ==
- Derry, Charles (30 September 2009). Dark Dreams 2.0: A Psychological History of the Modern Horror Film from the 1950s to the 21st Century. McFarland Publishing. p. 447. ISBN 9780786433971.
