= Scream, Baby, Scream =

1969 American horror film

- VHS cover
- Directed by: Joseph Adler
- Written by: Larry Cohen
- Produced by: Joseph Adler
- Starring: Ross Harris; Eugenie Wingate; Chris Martell; Suzanne Stuart; Larry Swanson; Gordon Walsh
- Cinematography: Julio C. Chávez
- Edited by: Joseph Adler
- Music by: Chris Martell
- Distributed by: Troma Entertainment
- Release date: 1969
- Running time: 84 minutes
- Country: United States
- Language: English

Scream, Baby, Scream (also known as Nightmare House) is a 1969 American horror film directed by Joseph Adler and written by Larry Cohen, who went on to write such horror classics as It's Alive and Q.

== Plot ==
Charles Butler is a world-renowned artist, but behind his macabre and grotesque imagery lies a more brutal truth.

Alongside the insane Dr. Garrison and their mutant lackeys, he is kidnapping beautiful models and artists so he can take his art to the next stage, and turn living humans into living paintings. Jason, a young art student realizes this disgusting scheme a little bit too late, as his beloved girlfriend Janet has been kidnapped by Butler and Garrison. As he races to their mansion in the middle of nowhere, stoned and afraid, Butler's last words with the boy echoes in his mind; "Yesterday's nightmare is today's dream and tomorrow's reality."
