= List of horror films of 1969 =

A list of horror films released in 1969.

Horror films released in 1969
Title	Director	Cast	Country	Notes
Blind Beast	Yasuzo Masumura	Eiji Funakoshi, Mako Midori, Noriko Sengoku	Japan	
Blood of Dracula's Castle	Al Adamson, Jean Hewitt	John Carradine, Alexander D’Arcy, Paula Raymond	United States	
The Corpse	Viktors Ritelis	Michael Gough, Yvonne Mitchell, Sharon Gurney	United Kingdom	
Eye of the Cat	David Lowell Rich	Michael Sarrazin, Gayle Hunnicutt, Eleanor Parker	United States	
Fangs of the Living Dead (a.k.a. Malenka, the Vampire's Niece)	Amando de Ossorio	Anita Ekberg, Julian Ugarte, Gianni Medici	Spain; Italy	
Fear No Evil	Paul Wendkos	Louis Jourdan	United States	Television film
Frankenstein Must Be Destroyed	Terence Fisher	Peter Cushing, Veronica Carlson, Freddie Jones	United Kingdom	
The Haunted House of Horror (a.k.a. The Dark)	Michael Armstrong	Frankie Avalon, Jill Haworth, Dennis Price	United Kingdom	
Hiroku Kaibyoden	Tokuzo Tanaka	Kojiro Hongo, Naomi Kobayashi, Mitsuyo Kamei	Japan	
Horrors of Malformed Men	Teruo Ishii	Teruo Yoshida, Tatsumi Hijikata, Minoru Ohki	Japan	
Inferno of Torture	Teruo Ishii		Japan	
It's Alive!	Larry Buchanan	Tommy Kirk, Shirley Bonne, Annabelle Weenick	United States	Television film
The Mad Room	Bernard Girard	Stella Stevens, Shelley Winters, Skip Ward	United States	
Night of Bloody Horror	Joy N. Houck, Jr.	Gerald McRaney, Gaye Yellen, Evelyn Hendricks	United States	
Nightmare in Wax	Bud Townsend	Cameron Mitchell, Scott Brady	United States	
The Oblong Box	Gordon Hessler	Vincent Price, Christopher Lee, Alister Williamson	United Kingdom; United States	
Rote lippen (a.k.a. Two Undercover Angels)	Jesús Franco	Janine Reynaud, Rossana Yanni, Adrian Hoven	West Germany; Spain	
Scream Baby Scream	Joseph Adler	Brad F. Grinter, Rossie Harris, Chris Martell	United States	

== Citations ==
- Curti, Roberto (2015). Italian Gothic Horror Films, 1957–1969. McFarland. ISBN 978-1-4766-1989-7.
- Hardy, Phil, ed. (1995). The Overlook Film Encyclopedia. Vol. 3. Overlook Press. ISBN 0-87951-624-0.
- Krafsur, Richard P., ed. (1997). The American Film Institute Catalog of Motion Pictures Produced in the United States: Feature Films, 1961–1970, Part 2. University of California Press. ISBN 0-520-20970-2.
- Lázaro-Reboll, Antonio (2004). Spanish popular cinema. Manchester University Press. ISBN 0-7190-6283-7.
