= Daniel Pearl (cinematographer) =

American cinematographer

- Born: 1951 (age 73–74); The Bronx, New York, U.S.
- Occupation: Cinematographer
- Years active: 1974–present

Daniel Pearl, A.S.C. (born 1951 in The Bronx, New York) is an American cinematographer who has worked on many feature films, over 400 music videos and more than 250 commercials. He is known for his cinematography work on various horror films, including The Texas Chain Saw Massacre (1974) and its 2003 remake, Aliens vs. Predator: Requiem (2007), Friday the 13th (2009), The Boy (2016) and Mom and Dad (2017).

After gaining a master's degree at University of Texas at Austin, Pearl met Tobe Hooper in a film lab. After receiving some advice from the cinematographer about filters, Hooper later invited him to work on The Texas Chain Saw Massacre, saying that "it's really important that I have a Texan shoot this film."

He won the first MTV cinematography award for "Every Breath You Take." He filmed the Michael Bay-directed "I'd Do Anything for Love (But I Won't Do That)", which he cites as "one of my personal all-time favorite projects ... I think the cinematography is pure, and it tells a story about the song." Michael Bay would later produce the 2003 Chainsaw remake.

== Filmography ==
=== Film ===
Year	Title	Director	Notes
1974	The Texas Chain Saw Massacre	Tobe Hooper	
1978	Fairy Tales	Harry Hurwitz	
1978	The Fifth Floor	Howard Avedis	
1979	She Came to the Valley	Albert Band	
1979	Hometown U.S.A.	Max Baer Jr.	
1980	Getting Wasted	Paul Frizler	
1980	The Return	Greydon Clark	
1981	Full Moon High	Larry Cohen	
1982	The Junkman	H. B. Halicki	With Tony Syslo
1982	Zapped!	Robert J. Rosenthal	
1987	It's Alive III: Island of the Alive	Larry Cohen	
1987	A Return to Salem's Lot	Larry Cohen	
1987	Amazon Women on the Moon	Joe Dante; Carl Gottlieb; Peter Horton; John Landis; Robert K. Weiss	
1987	Deadly Illusion	Larry Cohen; William Tannen	
1987	Hiding Out	Bob Giraldi	
2003	The Texas Chainsaw Massacre	Marcus Nispel	
2007	Pathfinder	Marcus Nispel	
2007	Captivity	Roland Joffé	
2007	Aliens vs. Predator: Requiem	Greg and Colin Strause	
2009	Friday the 13th	Marcus Nispel	
2012	The Obama Effect	Charles S. Dutton	
2012	The Apparition	Todd Lincoln	
2012	No One Lives	Ryuhei Kitamura	
2016	The Boy	William Brent Bell	
2017	Mom and Dad	Brian Taylor	
2019	The Intruder	Deon Taylor	

=== Television ===
Year	Title	Director	Notes
1998	When You Believe: Music from 'The Prince of Egypt'	Mary Lambert	Documentary film; Mariah Carey's segments
2004	Frankenstein	Marcus Nispel	TV movie
2012	Great Performances	Jim Gable	Episode "Rod Stewart: Merry Christmas, Baby"
2015	Mariah Carey's Merriest Christmas	James Yukich	TV special
2021	Mariah's Christmas: The Magic Continues	Joseph Kahn	TV special

=== Actor ===
Year	Title	Director	Notes
2013	Crystal Lake Memories: The Complete History of Friday the 13th	Daniel Farrands	Documentary film, himself
