= The Ambulance =

1990 film by Larry Cohen

- Home media release poster
- Directed by: Larry Cohen
- Written by: Larry Cohen
- Produced by: Larry Cohen; Moctesuma Esparza; Robert A. Katz
- Starring: Eric Roberts; James Earl Jones; Megan Gallagher; Richard Bright
- Cinematography: Jacques Haitkin
- Edited by: Claudia Finkle; Armond Leibowitz
- Music by: Jay Chattaway
- Production company: Epic Productions
- Distributed by: Triumph Releasing Corporation
- Release date: October 19, 1990
- Running time: 95 minutes
- Country: United States
- Language: English

The Ambulance is a 1990 American comedy thriller film written and directed by Larry Cohen. It stars Eric Roberts, Megan Gallagher, James Earl Jones, Janine Turner, Red Buttons, and Eric Braeden as the Doctor. Kevin Hagen, in his final film role released during his lifetime, plays a cop. In his first film role, Stan Lee of Marvel Comics has a small role as himself.

== Plot ==
Aspiring comic book artist Josh Baker meets a young woman named Cheryl on the streets of New York City, who proceeds to collapse and is rushed to a hospital by an ambulance. When Josh arrives at the hospital, he is shocked to find that there is no record of Cheryl ever being admitted. He soon learns another startling discovery: Cheryl's roommate also vanished after being picked up by the same ambulance.

Convinced that there is some sort of conspiracy going on, Josh proceeds to investigate the disappearances, despite the overt disdain and discouragement from Lt. Spencer.

== Cast ==
- Eric Roberts as Josh Baker
- James Earl Jones as Lieutenant Frank Spencer
- Megan Gallagher as Officer Sandra Malloy
- Red Buttons as Elias Zacharai
- Janine Turner as Cheryl Turner
- Eric Braeden as The Doctor
- Richard Bright as Detective Jerry McClosky
- James Dixon as Detective John "Jughead" Ryan
- Jill Gatsby as Jerilyn O'Brien
- Martin Barter as Street Gang Leader
- Laurene Landon as Patty
- Nick Chinlund as Hugo (credited as Nicholas Chinlund)
- Beatrice Winde as Head Nurse
- Kevin Hagen as Cop At Stables
- Matt Norklun as Ambulance Driver
- Rudy Jones as Ambulance Driver
- Stan Lee as Marvel Comics Editor
- Deborah Hedwall as Nurse Barbera Feinstein
- Susan Blommaert as Hospital Receptionist
- Jordan Derwin as Hospital Official
- Alexandra Jones as The Waitress
- Michael O'Hare as Hal

== Production ==
In November 1988, it was reported that Larry Cohen would be writing and directing The Ambulance for Trans World Entertainment with Lionel Stander to star as an aging reporter investigating a link between an ambulance and the disappearance of New York City residents.

Cohen later said he was inspired by "the concept of taking something that is thought of as being benign or benevolent... or anything else that has a safe and wholesome image, and turning it into an object of terror." He had done this for It's Alive (babies) and The Stuff (junk food) and wanted to do it with ambulances. "When you hear or see an ambulance on the street, it's usually considered to be something that is going to rescue you and take care of you, a vehicle of mercy," said Cohen. "In this story, it's actually a vehicle of murder. The whole idea of an ambulance that suddenly arrives from nowhere, picks people up, and takes them away to some dark place where they are never seen or heard of again was completely original and creepy." Cohen further cited his own experience being taken in an ambulance after an attack of indigestion. Describing the incident, Cohen stated:

What a terrifying experience it was to be taken and put in one of those things. You’re never more helpless than when you’re strapped down in one of those stretchers. You don't know what they're sticking into your arm or what they're doing to you. You sign that piece of paper when you go in the hospital and then your life isn't your own anymore, you're under the control of somebody else. And you don't know what they're doing. This is the ultimate in vulnerability.

Cohen described the film as a dark comedy with the premise being a mixture of Franz Kafka and Alfred Hitchcock.

Cohen says at one stage the financiers wanted a "classier" title than The Ambulance so he retitled it In Thin Air. They changed their mind and the film went back to being called The Ambulance. In the May, 1990 edition of his column Stan's Soapbox, Stan Lee mentions playing himself in a scene in "an adventure mystery called Into Thin Air" and refers to the name change in a later column. Cohen became acquainted with Lee when a producer bought the rights to Doctor Strange. Cohen had been hired to write a script for the film that ultimately ended up not getting made. Despite the movie not getting made, Cohen became friends with Lee and Bob Kane and based on his experiences with the two of them decided to make the main character of The Ambulance a cartoonist and asked Stan Lee to act in the film. Lee was very eager to do the film as it was the only time scenes and dialogue had ever been written specifically for him rather than just a cameo appearance. Cohen continued to remain friends with Lee after the film.

Cohen wanted to cast John Travolta or Jim Carrey in the lead but his producers refused.

In April 1989 it was reported that Eric Roberts and James Earl Jones had been cast as the leads. The following month, it was reported that production had begun on the film with Red Buttons having joined the cast.

Donald Trump made a small cameo in a deleted scene.

Jamie Lee Curtis was originally considered to play Officer Sandra Malloy.

The role of the villain was originally played by Wesley Addy. However Cohen was unhappy with his performance and recast the role with Eric Braeden. Braeden's casting came at the suggestion of Cohen's mother who was a fan of The Young and the Restless.

Shooting took place between May and June of 1989.

== Release ==
Epic Productions had initially planned to release the film in October 1990, but this was later pulled with Triumph announcing a tentative release for early 1991. The delays in release were most likely attributed to legal and financial troubles with its original distributor Trans World Entertainment. Additionally, in May 1991, Epic Productions ceased their distribution and acquisition activities and fulfilled their existing distribution deals through an existing agreement with Columbia-Tristar Home Video.

Cohen had attempted to meet with other distributors to secure a theatrical release for the film, but due to the off-beat nature of the film that differed from most high concept thrillers of the time the film was seen as a gamble at the box office skipped a theatrical run in both the United States and United Kingdom.

The film had its premiere at the Montreal World Film Festival in 1991. The film was given a direct-to-video release on October 27, 1993 by Triumph Releasing .

The film was released on Blu-ray on March 13, 2018, by Scream Factory.

== See also ==
- List of films featuring diabetes
