= Harry Bellaver =

American actor (1905–1993)

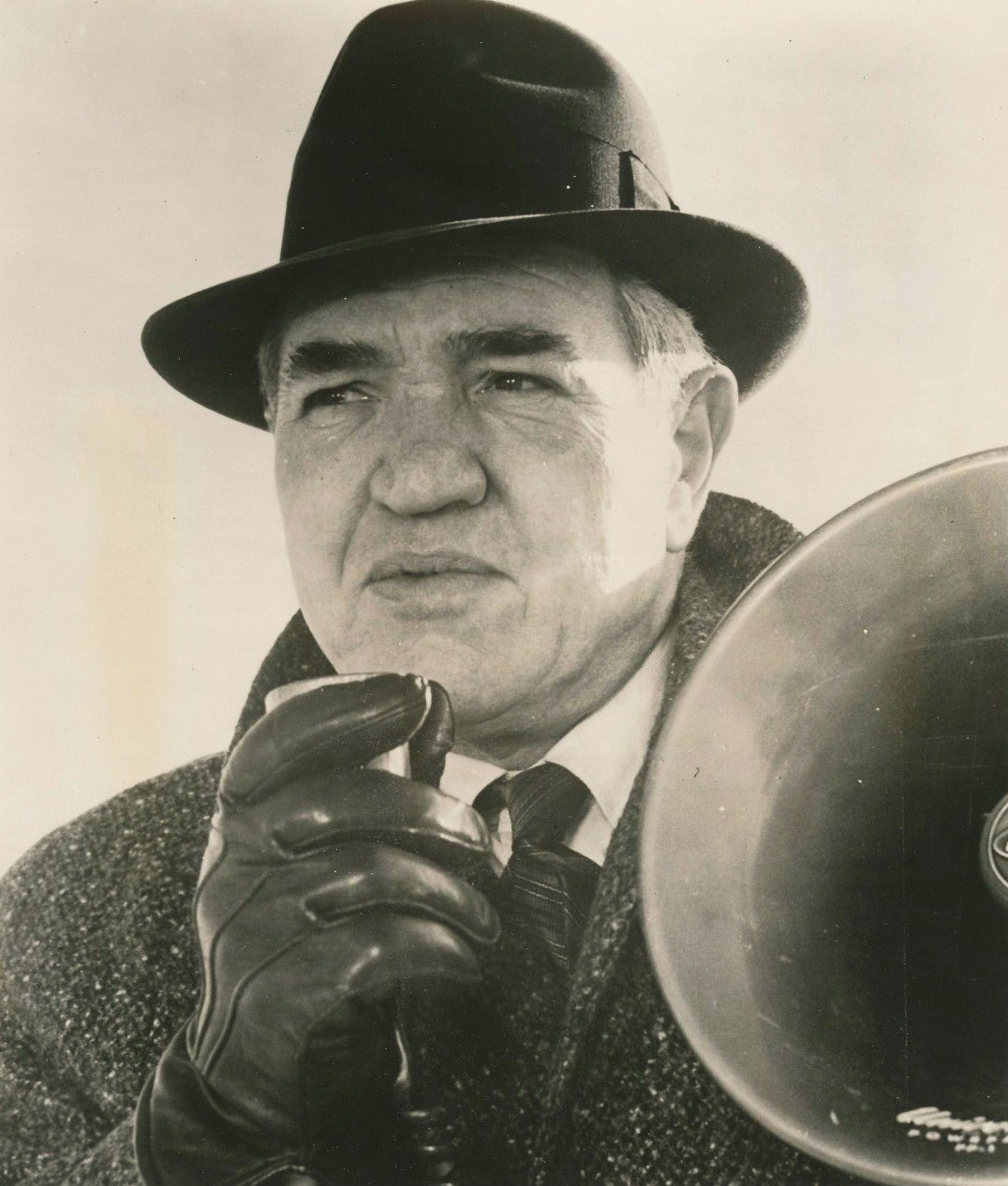
- Bellaver in Another World, 1970
- Born: Enricho Bellaver; February 12, 1905; Hillsboro, Illinois, U.S.
- Died: August 8, 1993 (aged 88); Nyack, New York, U.S.
- Occupation: Actor
- Years active: 1938–1985
- Spouse: Gertrude Dudley Vaughan Smith (m. 1932; died 1992)
- Children: 2

Harry Bellaver (born Enricho Bellaver; February 12, 1905 – August 8, 1993) was an American stage, film, and television actor who appeared in many roles from the 1930s through the 1980s. He starred in 136 episodes of the police drama Naked City (1958-1963)

== Early years ==
Bellaver was born in Hillsboro, Illinois, the son of Matteo and Maria (née Copa) Bellaver. His father worked in the Hillsboro coal mines. He left school at a young age and worked various jobs but eventually was awarded a scholarship to Brookwood Labor College in Katonah, New York.

== Stage ==
Bellaver was a member of the Hedgerow Players of Rose Valley, Pennsylvania, for eight years. Early in Bellaver's career, he appeared in numerous Broadway plays. He made his Broadway debut in the 1931 Group Theatre in the play 1931.

Bellaver appeared in the original production of the Broadway musical Annie Get Your Gun as Chief Sitting Bull. He appeared in the same role in the 1958 and 1966 revivals.

== Film ==
Bellaver was a prolific film character actor, mainly in "working class" roles, from 1939 through the 1960s. He appeared in the film adaptation of From Here to Eternity and in several notable film noirs. He played the role of ex-convict "Creeps" in 1939's Another Thin Man with William Powell and Myrna Loy. He appeared in The House on 92nd Street (1945) as a taxi driver spying for the Nazis and again played a cab driver, this time victimized by a gangster, in Side Street (1950). He played Sam the Surgeon in the classic Bob Hope comedy The Lemon Drop Kid (1951).

He appeared in Love Me or Leave Me with James Cagney and Doris Day in 1955 and The Old Man and the Sea with Spencer Tracy in 1958. His other film roles included appearances in One Potato, Two Potato (1964), A Fine Madness (1966), Madigan (1968), The Hot Rock (1972), God Told Me To (1976), Blue Collar (1978), and the comedy Hero at Large (1980), starring John Ritter and Anne Archer. His last film role was as an old miner in the horror film The Stuff (1985).

== Television ==
Bellaver is best known for his featured role as Sgt. Frank Arcaro, in the television series Naked City, appeared in 136 of the series' 138 combined episodes. He played an older, mellow detective who was a counterpoint to the dedicated young detectives played by James Franciscus and Paul Burke. He also was on Another World as Ernie Downs.

== Military service ==
Bellaver served in the Special Services Unit of the U.S. Army during World War II, where he toured the front lines as a stage manager and actor in the U.S.O. Camp Show Over 21, which starred Vivian Vance and Philip Ober.

== Personal life ==
Bellaver married Gertrude Dudley Vaughan Smith, "Dudley". They had two daughters, Vaughan and Lee.

Bellaver lived in Tappan, New York, when he died of pneumonia on August 8, 1993, at Nyack Hospital in Nyack, New York. He was survived by his daughters, Lee Bellaver of Stone Ridge, New York, and theatrical casting director Vaughn Bellaver-Allentuck of East Hampton, Long Island, two grandsons, a granddaughter, and two great-granddaughters.

== Broadway roles ==
- Night Over Taos (1932) - Diego
- Merry-Go-Round (1932) - Butch and as Beachley
- We, the People (1933) - Mike Ramsay
- She Loves Me Not (1933) - Mugg Schnitzel
- Russet Mantle (1936) - Pablo
- The World's Full of Girls (1943) - Sergeant Snyder
- Annie Get Your Gun (1946) - Chief Sitting Bull
- That Championship Season—1973—Booth Theatre; New York City

== Film roles ==
- Another Thin Man (1939) - 'Creeps' Binder
- The House on 92nd Street (1945) - Max Coburg
- Kiss of Death (1947) - Bull Weed (uncredited)
- Perfect Strangers (1950) - Gabor Simkiewicz, Bailiff
- Side Street (1950) - Larry Giff
- No Way Out (1950) - George Biddle
- Stage to Tucson (1950) - Gus Heyden
- The Lemon Drop Kid (1951) - Sam the Surgeon
- The Tanks Are Coming (1951) - Sergeant Lemchek
- Something to Live For (1952) - Billy, Elevator Operator
- From Here to Eternity (1953) - Private Mazzioli
- Miss Sadie Thompson (1953) - Joe Horn
- The Great Diamond Robbery (1954) - Herb
- Love Me or Leave Me (1955) - Georgie
- Serenade (1956) - Tonio
- The Birds and the Bees (1956) - Marty Kennedy
- The Brothers Rico (1957) - Mike Lamotta
- Slaughter on Tenth Avenue (1957) - Benjy Karp
- The Old Man and the Sea (1958) - Martin
- One Potato, Two Potato (1964) - Judge Powell
- A Fine Madness (1966) - Knocker
- Madigan (1968) - Mickey Dunn
- The Hot Rock (1972) - Rollo the Bartender
- God Told Me To (1976) - Cookie
- Blue Collar (1978) - Eddie Johnson
- Hero at Large (1980) - Eddie
- The Stuff (1985) - Old Miner (final film role)

== Selected Television roles ==
- Alfred Hitchcock Presents (1957) (Season 2 Episode 37: "The Indestructible Mr. Weems") - (Lodge) Brother Bronsky
- Alfred Hitchcock Presents (1957) (Season 3 Episode 5: "Silent Witness") - Police Sergeant Waggoner
