= God Told Me To =

1976 film by Larry Cohen

- Movie poster
- Directed by: Larry Cohen
- Written by: Larry Cohen
- Produced by: Larry Cohen
- Starring: Tony Lo Bianco; Sandy Dennis; Sylvia Sidney; Sam Levene; Robert Drivas; Mike Kellin; Richard Lynch; Deborah Raffin
- Cinematography: Paul Glickman
- Edited by: Arthur Mandelberg; William J. Waters; Chris Lebenzon; Michael D. Corey
- Music by: Frank Cordell
- Production company: The Georgia Company
- Distributed by: New World Pictures
- Release date: October 22, 1976
- Running time: 90 minutes
- Country: United States
- Language: English

God Told Me To (released in some theatrical markets as Demon) is a 1976 science fiction horror film written, directed, and produced by Larry Cohen. Like many of Cohen's films, it was shot on location in New York City and incorporates aspects of the police procedural. The film depicts sniper attacks, mass stabbings, mass shootings, and familicides performed by seemingly normal people, who all claim that God told them to kill. A religious NYPD detective suspects that the perpetrators were influenced by a cult leader with apparent psychic powers. During the investigation, the detective also investigates his own past and the identity of his birth mother. He discovers that both he and the cult leader were the result of mysterious virgin births.

== Plot ==
In New York City, a gunman perched atop a water tower opens fire with a .22 caliber rifle on the crowded streets below, randomly killing fifteen pedestrians. Peter Nicholas, a devout Catholic NYPD detective, climbs the tower to talk to the sniper. Before jumping to his death, the gunman tells Nicholas that "God told" him to commit the murders.

Although traumatized by the attack, Nicholas investigates a series of seemingly unpremeditated murders that follow: a mass stabbing at a supermarket, a mass shooting by a police officer at a St. Patrick's Day parade, and a man who murders his wife and children. They have all been committed by a variety of unconnected, seemingly normal assailants who claim that God told them to kill. Nicholas learns that one of the murderers knew a long-haired young man named Bernard Phillips. When Nicholas visits Phillips' address, Phillips' mother assaults Nicholas with a knife, but she dies during the attack by falling down a flight of stairs. She turns out to have been a virgin and to have once claimed she was abducted by aliens. Nicholas' superiors refuse to acknowledge a religious motivation for the murders and suspend him, so he leaks this story to the press, causing a panic.

A corrupt high-level NYPD officer is stabbed to death by Zero, a gangster he had betrayed. Zero disguises the murder as one of the "God" killings; however, Nicholas correctly deduces that it is a cover for a non-connected murder, noting that the previous killers all remained where they committed their crimes and accepted being arrested or shot (or committing suicide) after confessing that "God told them to" commit the atrocities.

A group of wealthy religious cultists are in thrall to Bernard Phillips and are aware that Phillips is influencing the murderers as he contacts and controls them via psychic powers while informing them of each impending atrocity. Phillips has one of the members invite Nicholas to join them, but when Nicholas asks whether the follower knows about Phillips' mother, the follower suffers convulsions and drops dead.

Another cult member attempts to kill Nicholas by pushing him in front of a subway train, but when he fails, Nicholas forces him to take him to Phillips, who isolates himself in a fiery furnace room deep underground. After delivering Nicholas, the follower decapitates himself using an elevator. A brief meeting convinces Nicholas that he himself is special and that the reason Phillips does not kill him is that Phillips needs him for some purpose.

By researching his own adoption records, Nicholas finds an old woman who seems to be his birth mother. She explains that she gave up her out-of-wedlock child after she was brutally impregnated by a strange ball of light while she walked home from the World's Fair in 1941. The meeting distresses both of them, and Nicholas is wracked with doubt over who or what he is. He realizes that he too has psychic powers, which he uses to confront and kill Zero.

Nicholas confronts Phillips one last time and discovers the truth: both he and Phillips are the result of "virgin births" caused by a mysterious extraterrestrial "entity of light" with psychic/supernatural powers and advanced spacecraft technology. Nicholas' human genes are dominant, which is why he is unaware of his true nature, while Phillips is more like their unseen progenitor. Phillips reveals himself to be a hermaphrodite who wishes to spawn a new species with his "brother". Nicholas refuses and attacks Phillips, whose powers cause the building they are in to collapse. Nicholas manages to escape the scene but Phillips is killed. Nicholas is arrested for the murder of Phillips. As he is led into court by police, a news reporter asks him why he committed the crime. He responds, "God told me to." Nicholas is committed to the Matteawan State Hospital for the Criminally Insane.

== Cast ==
- Tony Lo Bianco as Lieutenant Peter J. Nicholas
- Deborah Raffin as Casey Forster
- Sandy Dennis as Martha Nicholas
- Sylvia Sidney as Elizabeth Mullin
- Sam Levene as Everett Lukas
- Robert Drivas as David Morten
- Mike Kellin as Deputy Commissioner
- Richard Lynch as Bernard Phillips
- Sammy Williams as Harold Gorman
- George Patterson as Zero
- Harry Bellaver as "Cookie"
- Andy Kaufman as Police Assassin

== Production ==
Cohen took inspiration from the Bible to make the film; he thought God in the Bible was one of the most violent characters in literature. He was also influenced by Erich von Däniken's 1968 book Chariots of the Gods? Unsolved Mysteries of the Past.

The film was financed by Edgar Scherick and Daniel Blatt. They were originally credited as executive producers but Cohen says when they saw the finished film they insisted their names be taken off it.

Robert Forster was originally cast in the lead role. A few days into filming, he and Cohen had a falling out and Forster quit. Forster said Cohen "was one of those guys who yelled a lot on the set, and I said, 'Hey, this isn't for me. Let me out of here.' We parted friendly and all that." Cohen replaced him with Tony Lo Bianco, who had been in Cohen's play The Nature of the Crime.

Bernard Herrmann, who had scored Cohen's earlier film It's Alive (1974), was originally assigned to score God Told Me To as well, and Cohen claims on the DVD commentary track that Herrmann saw the first cut of the film immediately after completing the recording sessions for his score to Taxi Driver (1976) and made notes on how he believed it could be scored. However, within the next 15 hours, Herrmann died. Cohen then asked composer Miklós Rózsa to score the film. Rózsa turned it down, saying "God told me not to". Frank Cordell composed the score heard in the released version of God Told Me To, and both the film and Taxi Driver were dedicated to Herrmann. Composer Robert O. Ragland, who later scored Cohen's 1982 film Q – The Winged Serpent, wrote two of the songs for the film.

The alien abduction sequence, where a naked woman is drawn up into the cavernous interior of an extraterrestrial spacecraft, features (manipulated) generic stock model footage from Gerry Anderson's science fiction TV series Space: 1999.

Sylvia Sidney appears as Detective Nicholas's long-lost, traumatized mother in a nursing home. Andy Kaufman appears as a possessed policeman who goes on a shooting rampage at the Saint Patrick's Day parade — it was Kaufman's first role in any film, and the same footage was later used for the finale of a documentary called The Passion of Andy Kaufman, in a segment called "Thus Spake Zarathustra", with music by Eumir Deodato.

== Release and reception ==
The film was sold to New World Pictures. It did not perform well upon its original release and was re-issued under the title Demon.

Roger Ebert gave the film one star out of four. The film has since been reappraised, with Rolling Stone naming it one of the "20 Scariest Films You've Never Seen".

In the early 2010s, Time Out conducted a poll with several authors, directors, actors and critics who have worked within the horror genre to vote for their top horror films. God Told Me To placed at number 94 on their top 100 list.

On the review aggregator website Rotten Tomatoes, 80% of 15 critics' reviews are positive, with an average rating of 6.3/10. Metacritic, which uses a weighted average, assigned the film a score of 55 out of 100, based on 6 critics, indicating "mixed or average" reviews.
