= Ronni Chasen =

American publicist (1946–2010)

- Born: Veronica Cohen; October 17, 1946; Kingston, New York, U.S.
- Died: November 16, 2010 (aged 64); Beverly Hills, California, U.S.
- Cause of death: Homicide by gunshot
- Resting place: Hillside Memorial Park Cemetery in Culver City, California, U.S.
- Occupation: Publicist
- Relatives: Larry Cohen (brother)

Ronni Sue Chasen (October 17, 1946 – November 16, 2010) was an American publicist, who once represented such actors as Michael Douglas, as well as musicians such as Hans Zimmer and Mark Isham, among others. Chasen directed the Academy Award campaigns for more than 100 films during her career, including Driving Miss Daisy in 1989 and The Hurt Locker in 2009.

Chasen was shot and killed on November 16, 2010, while driving home from the premiere of the film Burlesque. Police initially suspected that that her death was the result of a contract killing by an expert marksman but later concluded that unemployed felon Harold Martin Smith killed Chasen during a random robbery. On December 2, 2010, Smith died by suicide after detectives attempted to approach him at his residence in Beverly Hills.

== Life and career ==
Chasen was born Veronica Cohen to a Jewish family on October 17, 1946, in Kingston, New York. She was raised in both the Riverdale neighborhood of the Bronx and the Washington Heights section of Manhattan. She won a series of Duncan Toys Company yo-yo contests held in Morningside Heights as a child.

Chasen began her early career as a publicist for her brother, film director Larry Cohen, who hired her as a publicist for his 1973 Blaxploitation film, Hell Up in Harlem, which became one of her earliest jobs in the industry.

Chasen became known in Hollywood for her PR work on such films as On Golden Pond (1981), and the second film in the Oliver Stone/Michael Douglas Wall Street film franchise, Wall Street: Money Never Sleeps (2010). She was pushing for Oscar recognition for Douglas in his role as the money hungry, risk averse character Gordon Gekko. Chasen successfully directed the Oscar campaign for the 1989 film Driving Miss Daisy, which won the Academy Award for Best Picture the following year.

In addition to being named the Senior Vice President for Publicity at Metro-Goldwyn-Mayer in 1993, Chasen owned the PR firm Chasen & Co., in which she focused on artists who composed film music, such as Trevor Horn, Mark Isham, Hans Zimmer, Jan A. P. Kaczmarek, and brothers David and Thomas Newman. Laura Dunn of the Society of Composers and Lyricists said of Chasen, "She laid the groundwork for so many others on how to be a top publicist in the film music industry representing top composers and songwriters."

According to Los Angeles Times film critic Patrick Goldstein, Chasen reminisced about her early years while working with George Burns on the hit 1970s film The Sunshine Boys and coaching the budding star John Travolta on how to handle his first interview after his fame first broke during Welcome Back, Kotter.

Chasen was working with Richard D. Zanuck and Lili Zanuck for the Oscar campaign of the 2010 film Alice in Wonderland at the time of her death. Following her murder, Chasen was called "Hollywood's ultimate old-school publicist" by Patrick Goldstein.

== Death ==
Chasen was shot in Beverly Hills on November 16, 2010, at approximately 12:28 a.m. PST, as she was driving home from the Hollywood premiere of the film Burlesque.

Neighbors near the intersection of Whittier Drive and Sunset Boulevard in the city of Beverly Hills, California originally reported hearing gunshots in front of their homes, but more calls came into the 911 call center a few moments later stating that a late model, black Mercedes-Benz had run a curb, then hit and toppled a concrete street light. When police arrived, they found Chasen slumped in the driver's seat, the steering wheel airbag inflated, with blood emanating from her nose and chest area, in and out of consciousness with the front passenger side window shattered. Chasen was pronounced dead at Cedars-Sinai Medical Center.

Chasen was buried at Hillside Memorial Park Cemetery in Culver City, California. She was the sister of film director Larry Cohen, who died in 2019.

=== Investigation ===
Beverly Hills Police Department sources stated that Chasen received three gunshot wounds to the chest and one to the back, causing her to lose control of the vehicle just after turning from Sunset Boulevard onto Whittier Drive. Police surmised that Chasen's killer was an expert marksman and likely shot her from an SUV or truck that pulled alongside her car. A leaked coroner's report noted that hollow-point bullets might have been used by the gunman.

On December 1, 2010, the Los Angeles Times reported that a man believed to be involved with Chasen's murder committed suicide after being confronted by police at the Harvey Apartments on Santa Monica Boulevard in East Hollywood, Los Angeles and that the suspect in Ronni Chasen's slaying had been under police surveillance before he killed himself. The Los Angeles Times reported the man, a convicted felon named Harold Martin Smith, was approached by police in the apartment lobby, at which point he pulled out a pistol and shot himself in the head. On December 6, 2010, it was reported that the man was no longer considered a person of interest in the murder. However, on December 8, 2010, the Beverly Hills Police Department declared its preliminary conclusion that Chasen's murder had been a random act of violence, a robbery attempt turned violent. According to the police, the gun the suspect used to kill himself was the same one used to murder Chasen. Police said they believed the man acted alone and it was in no way connected with road rage – an operating theory the previous week. An anonymous tip through America's Most Wanted stated that the suspect began bragging to neighbors that he shot Chasen and got $10,000 for it, but the final police report stated that the killing was a failed robbery.
