= Hitler Meets Christ =

- Directed by: Brendan Keown
- Written by: Michael Moriarty
- Produced by: Brendan Keown; Jeremy Dyson
- Starring: Michael Moriarty; Wyatt Page
- Release date: 2007 (Cinequest Film Festival)
- Country: Canada
- Language: English

Hitler Meets Christ is a film that premiered at the Cinequest Film Festival in 2007 and went on to play at other festivals internationally.

It was written as a play, then titled Hitler and Christ meet Death at the Port Authority Bus Station, by Michael Moriarty while he was living in New York and acting in Law & Order. It was adapted for screen after Moriarty moved to Vancouver, British Columbia, Canada.

The film was produced by Brendan Keown and Jeremy Dyson of Third Tribe Productions and directed by Brendan Keown.

In 2010 the film was released on DVD by Pathfinder Pictures.

== Plot ==
A homeless man who thinks he is Adolf Hitler meets another homeless man who thinks he's Jesus Christ at a train station.
