= A Return to Salem's Lot =

1987 horror film directed by Larry Cohen

- Promotional poster
- Directed by: Larry Cohen
- Written by: Larry Cohen; James Dixon
- Based on: Characters by Stephen King
- Produced by: Larry Cohen; Paul Kurta
- Starring: Michael Moriarty; Samuel Fuller; Andrew Duggan; Ricky Addison Reed; June Havoc; Evelyn Keyes
- Cinematography: Daniel Pearl
- Edited by: Armond Leibowitz
- Music by: Michael Minard
- Production company: Larco Productions
- Distributed by: Warner Bros.
- Release dates: May 13, 1987 (Cannes); August 1, 1987 (Shock Around the Clock Festival); September 11, 1987 (United States)
- Running time: 101 minutes
- Country: United States
- Language: English

A Return to Salem's Lot is a 1987 American vampire film co-written and directed by Larry Cohen and starring Michael Moriarty, Andrew Duggan, Samuel Fuller, Evelyn Keyes, and June Havoc. It is a theatrical sequel to the 1979 miniseries Salem's Lot, which in turn is based on the Stephen King novel of the same name. It follows an anthropologist and his son who encounter supernatural incidents and vampirism in the small town of Jerusalem's Lot. Ronee Blakely and Tara Reid appear in supporting roles, the latter making her feature film debut.

Cohen had previously written a screenplay for the 1979 Salem's Lot miniseries that had been rejected by Warner Bros. Pictures at the time. Years later, the studio approached Cohen to write and direct a low-budget feature for them; he proposed a sequel to Salem's Lot. While writing the screenplay, Cohen was inspired by Thornton Wilder's play Our Town, and sought to rework familiar tropes of the vampire film, presenting the vampires as typical Americans descended from Europe, having fled their native country to establish a colony in America in the 1600s.

Filmed in Vermont in late 1986, A Return to Salem's Lot was screened at the 1987 Cannes Film Market before receiving a limited theatrical release from Warner Bros. in the fall of that year.

== Plot ==
Joe Weber, an anthropologist working in South America, is summoned back to the United States by his ex-wife, Sally, who informs him that their dysfunctional adolescent son, Jeremy, will be committed to a psychiatric institution if Joe does not intervene. Joe takes custody of Jeremy, and decides to return to his hometown of Salem's Lot, Maine, where he owns an abandoned, rundown farmhouse passed down to him by his deceased Aunt Clara.

Unbeknownst to Joe, Salem's Lot is in fact a vampire colony. One night, a group of teenagers are stopped by police officers who subsequently—along with other various townspeople—begin feeding on them. Sherry, one of the teenagers, manages to hide out in a church before fleeing to the outskirts of town, stumbling into Joe and Jeremy's home. Joe brings Sherry to meet with Judge Axel, the town mayor, to report the incident. Inside, Joe, Sherry, and Jeremy are welcomed to a dinner attended by various high society, among them Amanda Fenton, the young granddaughter of the town doctor. At the urging of her grandmother, Amanda takes Jeremy on a tour of the town while the adults congregate. When Sherry notices one of her attackers at the gathering, she becomes hysterical, and is escorted to another room to be killed and fed upon.

To Joe's shock, Judge Axel reveals himself and the townspeople to be vampires. Axel attempts to appeal to Joe's objective anthropological methodology, hoping he can give their community mainstream exposure, and eventually write a religious text for their people. Axel gives Joe a tour of the town, during which he explains the dangers of drinking human blood in the late 20th-century, amongst them various contractible viruses such as hepatitis and AIDS. To remedy this, Axel has arranged for the locals to primarily feast on the blood of live cows at their local dairy. During the tour, Joe is met by his Aunt Clara, whom he believed to be dead—she, too, is a vampire. During the feeding on the cows for blood, Mrs. Axel states " I must confesses I prefer human blood" and "Axel says I have a drinking problem".

Bewildered by what he has learned, Joe nevertheless decides to remain in Salem's Lot and renovate his familial home. At a nighttime school meeting, Jeremy and Joe learn that the townspeople have bred "drones", people who can safely be exposed to sunlight in order to oversee daily operations of the community, maintaining a façade of normalcy. The school principal also explains the vampires' origins, and how they traveled to the United States concurrent to the pilgrims. Joe soon rekindles a romance with Cathy (also a vampire), a woman whom he had an affair with as a teenager. Meanwhile, Jeremy tells Joe that he plans to become a vampire and live eternally in the community. When Jeremy becomes sensitive to sunlight and grows ill, Joe realizes he has already begun his transformation. When Joe attempts to flee with Jeremy, he is attacked along a river by two of the local drones, one of whom he bludgeons to death with a rock, before being knocked unconscious himself.

Joe awakens from the attack in the Axels' home, where Aunt Clara, Cathy, and others reveal that Cathy is pregnant with Joe's child. They also inform him Jeremy is about to be "reborn". Shortly after, Joe is met by Van Meer, an eccentric Nazi hunter who has been surveilling the town. Joe and Van Meer bond together, hoping to save Jeremy from the vampires' influence. After staging a siege against the townspeople with Van Meer and burning down their homes, Joe and Jeremy are confronted by Axel, who reveals himself in his true, grotesque vampiric form. A fight ensues in a barn, culminating in Axel being impaled with an American flag. Van Meer, stealing a schoolbus, saves Joe and Jeremy. The trio drives away from Salem's Lot as the sun rises, and the remaining vampires burn in the sunlight.

== Cast ==
- Michael Moriarty as Joe Weber
- Ricky Addison Reed as Jeremy Weber
- Samuel Fuller as Van Meer
- Andrew Duggan as Judge Axel
- Evelyn Keyes as Mrs. Axel
- Jill Gatsby as Sherry
- June Havoc as Aunt Clara
- Ronee Blakley as Sally
- James Dixon as Rains
- David Holbrook as Deputy
- Katja Crosby as Cathy
- Tara Reid as Amanda Fenton
- Brad Rjin as Clarence
- Janelle Webb as Sarah
- Robert Burr as Dr. Fenton

== Themes ==
Larry Cohen biographer Tony Williams describes a unifying theme of A Return to Salem's Lot as that of "becoming a human being." Williams also notes the film's vampires as being presented as part of a capitalist consumer society, writing that the "ancient consumer society of vampires are really all-American... [the film] presents vampires as a fundamental part of America's economic and institutional structure."

Author Mike Mayo, writing in The Horror Show Guide: The Ultimate Frightfest of Movies (2013), notes that Cohen "uses Stephen King's premise of a small town overrun by bloodsuckers as a platform from which he can satirize conservative American smugness."

== Production ==
=== Development ===
Larry Cohen said the film began when he went to Warner Bros. with Andre de Toth and pitched them the idea of remaking House of Wax (1953). Warner was not interested. However the studio wanted Cohen to make a film for their video division. Cohen was only willing to do this if Warner would pay for two films, to be shot back-to-back. Warner agreed. The two films were to It's Alive III: Island of the Alive and A Return to Salem's Lot. Both had built-in name recognition ideal for the straight-to-video market.

Cohen had previously written a draft screenplay for the 1979 miniseries based on Stephen King's novel of the same name, but it was rejected by Warner Bros. at the time. Years later, Warner Bros. approached Cohen to direct another low-budget feature for them, and he proposed a sequel to Salem's Lot that only loosely used King's source novel for its basis. Cohen was influenced by the Thornton Wilder play Our Town when writing the screenplay.

"The intention was always to bring a sense of humor to the picture in playing with the established elements of vampire movies. Audiences recognize aspects of the mythology and know what they mean, but I don't like vampire movies particularly. In fact, I find them very tedious. With A Return to Salem's Lot, I tried to revamp the vampire legend by making vampires the most persecuted race in Europe."

=== Filming ===
Principal photography took place in Vermont in St. Johnsbury, as well as Newbury and Peacham, in the fall of 1986. Some additional photography took place in New York City.

Recalling the shooting experience in Peacham, Cohen said: "The inhabitants virtually gave us the entire town. I disrupted normal activities for several weeks. Since the film was about vampires, I shot late into the night and recruited the townspeople to be extras and their children to play young vampires." The film was shot by cinematographer Daniel Pearl, who had previously shot Tobe Hooper's The Texas Chain Saw Massacre (1974).

== Release ==
A Return to Salem's Lot opened at the Cannes Film Market on May 13, 1987. (Note: In an article published in the New York Daily News on Monday, May 18, 1987, the journalist notes their attendance of a screening of the film (along with Cohen's It's Alive III: Island of the Alive) on the previous Wednesday; this date, though not named, would have been May 13, 1987.) On August 1, 1987, the film screened at the Shock Around the Clock Festival, a horror film festival in London. It was given a limited theatrical release in the United States by Warner Bros., opening on September 11, 1987 in select cities, such as Fall River, Massachusetts. The film opened in Des Moines, Iowa the following week, on September 18, 1987.

=== Home media ===
A Return to Salem's Lot was released on VHS by Warner Home Video on July 20, 1988. The film was released to made-on-demand DVD by the Warner Archive Collection in 2010.

In June 2021, it was announced that Shout! Factory, through its horror sub-label Scream Factory, would be releasing the film for the first time on Blu-ray on August 21, 2021.

== Reception ==
The Des Moines Register gave the film a zero-star rating, referring to it as "a festival of bad acting" and "quite possibly the most amateurishly made vampire movie in memory," adding, "Return, in fact, plays like a movie made by people who've heard about how movies are made but who've never seen one." Jim Schembri of The Age noted that the film "outstay[s] its welcome after about five minutes." William Thomas of Empire gave the film a one out of four star-rating, writing, "Larry Cohen, the man who helmed Q and It’s Alive!, directs as if he has been possessed by some middling incubus of the film industry. Pallid doesn't do it. This is offensively bad in every department and should be left to rot in a vault somewhere."

Alan Jones of the Radio Times gave the film a favorable review, awarding it 3 out of 5 stars and writing: "Cohen happily whittles away at the American Dream, offering plenty of satire and allegory, as well as examining moral dilemmas, plus fine performances by old-timers June Havoc, Evelyn Keyes and director Samuel Fuller, who steals the show as a single-minded vampire hunter." The New York Daily News ranked the film number four in a list of the top-ten B movies of the year.

DVD Talk commented that the film was "Too interesting to miss, but regrettably not very scary."

== See also ==
- 'Salem's Lot
- Vampire films
- List of vampire films

== Sources ==
- Doyle, Michael (2015). Larry Cohen: The Stuff of Gods and Monsters. Los Gatos, California: BearManor Media. ISBN 978-1-310-99378-7.
- Mayo, Mike (2013). The Horror Show Guide: The Ultimate Frightfest of Movies. Los Angeles, California: Visible Ink Press. ISBN 978-1-578-59459-7.
- Williams, Tony (2016). Larry Cohen: The Radical Allegories of an Independent Filmmaker (Revised ed.). Jefferson, North Carolina: McFarland & Company. ISBN 978-1-476-61819-7.
