= It's Alive (2009 film) =

Film by Josef Rusnak

- DVD cover
- Directed by: Josef Rusnak
- Screenplay by: Larry Cohen; Paul Sopocy; James Portolese
- Based on: It's Alive; 1974 film by Larry Cohen
- Produced by: Marc Toberoff; Robert Katz
- Starring: Bijou Phillips; James Murray; Owen Teale; Jack Ellis; Skye Bennett; Arkie Reece; Todd Jensen; Raphaël Coleman
- Cinematography: Wedigo von Schultzendorff
- Edited by: Alain Jakubowicz; Patrick McMahon
- Music by: Nicholas Pike
- Distributed by: Millennium Films
- Release date: April 20, 2009
- Running time: 80 minutes
- Country: United States
- Language: English
- Box office: $1,035,267

It's Alive is a 2009 American science fiction horror film directed by Josef Rusnak. It is a remake of the 1974 film written and directed by Larry Cohen. Bijou Phillips stars as a mother who has a mutant baby that kills people when scared. The film was released on April 2, 2009, as a direct-to-video and received mostly negative reviews upon release.

== Plot ==
In Albuquerque, New Mexico, Lenore Harker leaves college to have a baby with her architect boyfriend, Frank. After discovering the baby has doubled in size in just a month, Dr. Orbinson and his surgical team extract the baby by caesarian section. After the doctor cuts the umbilical cord, the newborn mutant baby Daniel goes on a rampage and slaughters the surgical team in the operating room. He afterwards crawls onto his mother's belly and falls asleep. Lenore and Daniel are found on the operating table, the room covered in blood. Lenore has no memory of what happened.

After questioning by the police, Lenore wants to leave and take Daniel home. Authorities arrange for a psychologist to help her regain her memory of the delivery. Soon, Daniel bites Lenore when she feeds him, revealing his taste for blood.

Daniel begins to attack small animals and progresses to killing adult humans when he is scared. One of his victims is the therapist who came to Lenore and Frank's house who wants to try hypnosis on Lenore but she refuses. She asks the therapist to leave. Lenore refuses to accept that her baby is a cannibalistic killer. Frank comes home from work to find Lenore sitting in the baby's room, but Daniel is not in his crib. The electricity goes off. Frank goes to check the fuse and at the same time searches for Daniel in the basement. Then he finds himself locked in by Daniel. Daniel kills Marco, the police officer who came with Sergeant Perkins. Perkins finds Frank in the basement. As Perkins and Frank search for the mutant baby, Daniel suddenly attacks Perkins cause him to accidentally shoot the gas which cause the explosion, killing him in the process. While Lenore heard the noise, she finally stands up and begins looking for Daniel. Frank tricks Daniel to enter the trash can and captures him in the process. He takes him far away to the house now setting on fire. While Lenore calling out Frank and Daniel, he kept continuing screaming as Frank brings his gun about to shoot the mutant baby. But cannot bring himself to kill him as Daniel begins to cry. While Daniel continue crying, Frank was hesitating to open the lid. As Frank opens the trash can, he thinks Daniel died from lack of oxygen but an enraged Daniel leaps out of the trash can and attacks Frank in retaliation.

Lenore finds Frank injured, she apologizes Frank for everything that happened to them. But then Daniel cries can be heard, Lenore finds Daniel and she brings him into the burning house. Going inside the baby room and sit on a rocking chair as she sings him to sleep. Frank and Chris watch helplessly as the house burns to the ground with Lenore and Daniel inside.

== Cast ==
- Bijou Phillips as Lenore Harker
- James Murray as Frank Davis
- Raphaël Coleman as Chris Davis
- Owen Teale as Sgt. Perkins
- Ty Glaser as Marnie
- Oliver Coopersmith as Mike
- Ioan Lov as Adam
- Jack Ellis as Prof. Baldwin
- Skye Bennett as Nicole
- Arkie Reece as Perry
- Todd Jensen as Dr. Orbinson
- Marianna Stanicheva as Nurse #1
- Alexis Bergemann as Nurse #2
- Michal Yannai as Wrinkled Nurse
- Laura Giosh as Officer Marcos

== Production ==
Shooting began in Sofia, Bulgaria, in March 2007.

== Release ==
The film was released straight-to-DVD in the United States on October 6, 2009. It is available in both rated and unrated editions. The film had theatrical release in the Philippines in August 2009. Outside the US, it grossed $957,897.

== Reception ==
Gareth Jones of Dread Central rated it 3/5 stars and wrote, "Don't go into It's Alive expecting a genuinely good movie (let's face it, neither was the original), but do expect to be entertained." Brian Orndorf of DVD Talk rated it 1.5/5 stars and wrote that the film "lacks suspense or even basic waves of dread".

Not all reviews of the film were negative. HorrorFreakNews.com awarded the film 3 out of 5 stars, writing, "It's Alive intelligently shifts conventional scary movie making. Moreover, the movie cleverly pushes the viewer to focus on the evil incarnated by the child."

Larry Cohen, the director of the 1974 original, was interviewed on December 21, 2009, regarding the remake and commented : "It's a terrible picture. It's just beyond awful. ... I would advise anybody who likes my film to cross the street and avoid seeing the new enchilada."
