= Perfect Strangers (1984 film) =

- Film poster
- Directed by: Larry Cohen
- Written by: Larry Cohen
- Produced by: Paul Kurta
- Starring: Anne Carlisle; Brad Rijn; Ann Magnuson
- Cinematography: Paul Glickman
- Edited by: Armond Lebowitz
- Music by: Dwight Dixon
- Production company: Hemdale Film Corporation
- Distributed by: New Line Cinema
- Release date: November 1984
- Running time: 91 minutes
- Country: United States
- Language: English
- Budget: $4.1 million

Perfect Strangers is a 1984 thriller film directed by Larry Cohen. It stars Anne Carlisle, Brad Rijn and Ann Magnuson.

== Plot ==
A Mafia hit man discovers a young boy has witnessed him killing someone. Under Mafia pressure he is urged to kill the boy but is picked up by the boy's mother and soon they fall into a relationship.

== Cast ==
- Anne Carlisle as Sally
- Brad Rijn as Johnny
- John Woehrle as Fred
- Matthew Stockley as Matthew
- Stephen Lack as Burns
- Ann Magnuson as Malda

== See also ==
- List of American films of 1984
