= Pick Me Up (Masters of Horror) =

- Masters of Horror episode
- DVD cover
- Episode no.: Season 1 Episode 11
- Directed by: Larry Cohen
- Written by: David Schow
- Production code: 111
- Original air date: January 20, 2006

Guest appearances
- Paul Anthony; Fairuza Balk; Crystal Lowe; Malcolm Kennard; Warren Kole; Laurene Landon; Michael Moriarty

Episode chronology
← Previous "Sick Girl"	Next → "Haeckel's Tale"

"Pick Me Up" is the eleventh episode of the first season of Masters of Horror. Aired in North America on January 20, 2006, it was based on the short story by David J. Schow. The episode was directed by Larry Cohen, his final project before his death in 2019.

== Plot ==
On a two-lane highway, two serial killers clash in a turf war: one is named Wheeler (Michael Moriarty) who kills hitchhikers he picks up in his truck, and the other is named Walker (Warren Kole) who is a hitchhiker who murders whoever gives him a ride. Stacia (Fairuza Balk), a recently divorced woman, falls in between the battle of wits.

After a transport bus breaks down, Wheeler and Walker kill the driver and passengers — save for Stacia, who left previously. Fascinated, Wheeler and Walker examine each other's victims. Wheeler murders a woman (Laurene Landon) and hangs her body in the truck, and pistol whips and decapitates a man with the sliding door of the luggage compartment. Walker garrotes the bus driver with a dead snake, shoots a passenger, leaves another passenger to die tied by her wrists to a tree and wrapped in barbed wire (whom Wheeler finds alive and taunts), slaughters a punk, and partially skins his girlfriend before killing her.

Later, at a roadside motel, the two psychopaths play head games with each other and Stacia, clashing over who will get to kill her. As she is leaving the motel, Wheeler offers her a ride then assaults her while driving, handcuffing her in the truck's cab. He finds Walker standing in the middle of the highway and brakes to a stop just before hitting him. Walker accepts a ride, and the two bicker and draw their pistols, ready to kill Stacia and each other. Stacia, sitting in the middle, slams on the brakes and sends the two murderers through the windshield onto the road and causes the truck's cab to fall on its side. Stacia unsuccessfully struggles to get Wheeler's gun, while the wounded Wheeler and Walker fight to determine who will kill her as an ambulance siren sounds.

In the end, Wheeler and Walker are side by side in the ambulance, still fighting and cursing at one another. Finally, they cease and declare a truce. Walker attempts to strike a deal with Wheeler as he points out how much fun the two of them could have with an ambulance, revealing that he still has his craft knife he used to torture the stoner's girlfriend. However, one of the EMTs rams syringes full of air into their chests, killing them both. The new killer tells the driver that he plans to save Stacia (bound and gagged in an upper bunk of the ambulance) for later.
