= Michael Moriarty =

American actor

- Born: Michael George Moriarty; April 5, 1941 (age 85); Detroit, Michigan, U.S.
- Education: Dartmouth College (BA)
- Occupation: Actor
- Years active: 1971–present
- Spouse: Margaret Brychka
- Relatives: George Moriarty (grandfather)
- Awards: Tony Award (1974); Golden Globe Award (1979); Emmy Award (1974, 1978, 2002)

Michael George Moriarty (born April 5, 1941) is an American actor. He received an Emmy Award and Golden Globe Award for his role as a Nazi SS officer in the 1978 miniseries Holocaust and a Tony Award in 1974 for his performance in the play Find Your Way Home. He starred as Executive Assistant District Attorney Benjamin Stone for the first four seasons (1990–1994) of the television show Law & Order. Moriarty is also known for his roles in films such as Bang the Drum Slowly, Who'll Stop the Rain, Q: The Winged Serpent, The Stuff, Pale Rider, Troll, Courage Under Fire, and Shiloh.

Moriarty is the grandson of Major League Baseball player, manager, scout, and umpire, George Joseph Moriarty.

== Early life ==
Moriarty was born in Detroit, Michigan, on April 5, 1941, the son of Eleanor—née Paull—and Dr. George Moriarty, a surgeon. His parents divorced when he was 11.

Moriarty attended middle school at Cranbrook School in Bloomfield Hills before transferring to the University of Detroit Jesuit High School, graduating in 1959. He then majored in theater at Dartmouth College, graduating with a bachelor of arts degree in 1963. He received a Fulbright Scholarship and moved to London, where he enrolled in the London Academy of Music and Dramatic Art.

== Acting career ==
Before gaining fame in films, Moriarty worked for several years as an actor at the Guthrie Theater in Minneapolis. In 1973, Moriarty was cast as the egocentric baseball player Henry Wiggen in Bang the Drum Slowly opposite Robert De Niro as a slow-witted, terminally ill catcher. In the same year, Moriarty starred in a TV movie adaptation of Tennessee Williams' The Glass Menagerie with Katharine Hepburn. Coincidentally, the film also featured Sam Waterston, who later replaced Moriarty as the Executive Assistant District Attorney on Law & Order. Moriarty's role in The Glass Menagerie (as Jim, the Gentleman Caller; Waterston played the son Tom) won him an Emmy Award for Best Supporting Actor. He had a small part in The Last Detail, which was nominated for several Academy Awards. In 1974, Moriarty starred as rookie detective Bo Lockley in the acclaimed police drama Report to the Commissioner.

Moriarty won a Tony Award in 1974 for his performance in the play Find Your Way Home. His career on the screen was slow to develop, while his theatre career was flourishing. He played the lead character in Report to the Commissioner and had a significant role in Who'll Stop the Rain. He starred as the German SS officer Erik Dorf in the television miniseries Holocaust, which earned him another Emmy. Through the 1980s, Moriarty starred in such Larry Cohen movies as Q, The Stuff, It's Alive III: Island of the Alive, and A Return to Salem's Lot (much later, he appeared in Pale Rider and The Hanoi Hilton, as well as the Masters of Horror episode "Pick Me Up", directed by Cohen. In 1986, he starred in the fantasy science-fiction movie Troll, playing the role of Harry Potter, Sr. (unrelated to the Harry Potter series).

In 1989, Moriarty starred in the HBO production Tailspin: Behind the Korean Airliner Tragedy, which dramatized the Soviet Union's shoot-down of Korean Air Lines flight 007 in 1983. He portrayed U.S. Air Force Major Hank Daniels, who was largely ignored (if not ridiculed) for showing how the ill-fated airliner had strayed off course into air space known by the Soviets to be used by U.S. Air Force electronic surveillance planes as they approached Soviet air space.

From 1990 to 1994, Moriarty starred as Executive Assistant District Attorney Ben Stone on Law & Order. He left the show in 1994, alleging that his departure was a result of his threatening a lawsuit against then-Attorney General Janet Reno, who had cited Law & Order as offensively violent. Moriarty criticized Reno's comment and claimed that she wanted to censor not only shows such as Law & Order, but also such fare as Murder, She Wrote. He later accused Law & Order executive producer Dick Wolf of not taking his concerns seriously and claimed that Wolf and other network executives were "caving in" to Reno's "demands" on the issue of TV violence. On September 20, 1994, on The Howard Stern Show, he made an offer to NBC, claiming that he would return to his role on the show if Wolf was fired. Moriarty published a full-page advertisement in a Hollywood trade magazine calling upon fellow artists to stand up with him against attempts to censor TV show content. He subsequently wrote and published The Gift of Stern Angels, his account of this time in his life. In the fictional Law & Order universe, Ben Stone resigns from the D.A.'s office in 1994 after a witness in one of his cases is murdered. The February 7, 2018, episode of Law & Order: Special Victims Unit shows Sam Waterston's character, Jack McCoy, delivering a eulogy at Stone's funeral.

Wolf and others working on Law & Order contradict Moriarty's account of how he left the series. On November 18, 1993, Moriarty and Wolf, along with other television executives, met with Reno to dissuade her from supporting any law that would censor the show. Wolf said that Moriarty overreacted to any effect the law was likely to have on the show. Law & Order producers claim they were forced to remove Moriarty from the series because of "erratic behavior", an example of which reportedly happened during the filming of the episode "Breeder", when, according to the episode's director Arthur Forney, Moriarty began muttering to himself with a vacant look in his eyes, was unable to deliver his lines with a straight face, and had to be taken to a doctor. Series and network officials deny any connection between his departure and Janet Reno. Wolf also denies that the show has become less violent, graphic, or controversial since 1994.

Moriarty acted in The Last Detail, Courage Under Fire, Along Came a Spider, Shiloh, Emily of New Moon, and James Dean, for which he won his third Emmy. In 2007, he debuted his first feature-length film as screenwriter and performed the role of a man who thinks he is Adolf Hitler in Hitler Meets Christ.

== Other ventures ==
In addition to his acting career, Moriarty is a semiprofessional jazz pianist and singer, as well as a classical composer. He has recorded three jazz albums (although the first, Reaching Out, went unreleased). He has regularly performed live in both New York City and Vancouver with a jazz trio and quintet. In a 1990 concert review, New York Times reviewer Stephen Holden called Moriarty "a jazz pianist of considerable skill, an oddball singer with more than one vocal personality, and a writer of eccentric, jivey jazz songs."

Moriarty is politically active, describing himself as a "centrist" and sometimes as a "realist". Moriarty announced his intention to run for the presidency in 2008 in an interview in the November 2005 issue of Northwest Jazz Profile, but he never formally declared his candidacy. He later endorsed fellow former Law & Order actor Fred Thompson for the presidency during the 2008 Republican primaries, as well as Carly Fiorina during the 2016 primary election cycle. He has been a frequent contributor of numerous political columns to the Enter Stage Right online Journal of Conservatism.

Moriarty was a member of the Writers and Artists for Peace in the Middle East, a pro-Israel group. In 1984, he signed a letter protesting West German arms sales to Saudi Arabia.

== Personal life ==
In 1966, Moriarty married the ballet dancer Francoise Martinet. They had one son and divorced in 1978. That year, he married Anne Hamilton Martin; they divorced in 1997. In 1998, he married Suzana Cabrita; they divorced in 1999. Moriarty then entered a common-law relationship with his manager, Margaret Brychka. In November 2000, he was charged with assaulting Brychka. Moriarty, who had entered an alcohol treatment program, was released on a peace bond and the proceedings were stayed. The couple reunited.

Shortly after leaving Law & Order, Moriarty moved to Canada, declaring himself a political exile.

In 2006, in the blog Enter Stage Right Moriarty wrote that he was a "very bad drunk", but as of 2004, he had been sober for two years.

== Filmography ==
=== Film ===
| Year | Title | Role | Notes |
|---|---|---|---|
| 1971 | My Old Man's Place | Trubee Pell | |
| 1972 | Hickey & Boggs | Ballard | |
| 1973 | Bang the Drum Slowly | Henry "Author" Wiggen | |
| 1973 | The Last Detail | First Lieutenant Marine Duty Officer | |
| 1974 | Shoot It Black, Shoot It Blue | Herbert G. Rucker | |
| 1975 | Report to the Commissioner | Bo Lockley | |
| 1978 | Who'll Stop the Rain | John Converse | |
| 1981 | Reborn | Mark | |
| 1982 | The Sound of Murder | Charles Norberry | |
| 1982 | Q | Jimmy Quinn | |
| 1982 | Blood Link | Keith Mannings | |
| 1985 | Odd Birds | Brother T.S. Murphy | |
| 1985 | Pale Rider | Hull Barret | |
| 1985 | The Stuff | David "Mo" Rutherford | |
| 1986 | Troll | Harry Potter Sr. | |
| 1987 | The Hanoi Hilton | Williamson | |
| 1987 | It's Alive III: Island of the Alive | Jarvis | |
| 1987 | A Return to Salem's Lot | Joe Weber | |
| 1989 | The Secret of the Ice Cave | Manny Wise | |
| 1989 | Dark Tower | Dennis Randall | |
| 1990 | Full Fathom Five | McKenzie | |
| 1995 | Broken Silence | Pater Mulligan | Chicago International Film Festival Award for Best Supporting Actor |
| 1996 | Courage Under Fire | General Hershberg | |
| 1996 | Shiloh | Ray Preston | |
| 1998 | Earthquake in New York | Captain Paul Stenning | |
| 1999 | The Art of Murder | Cole Sheridan | |
| 1999 | Shiloh 2: Shiloh Season | Ray Preston | |
| 2000 | Woman Wanted | Richard Goddard | |
| 2001 | House of Luk | Mr. Kidd | |
| 2001 | Along Came a Spider | Senator Hank Rose | |
| 2003 | Cold Blooded | Mark Solomon | |
| 2005 | Fugitives Run | Callohan | |
| 2005 | Neverwas | Dick | |
| 2007 | Hitler Meets Christ | Hitler | |
| 2012 | The Yellow Wallpaper | Mr. Isaac Hendricks | |
| 2017 | King Cohen: The Wild World of Filmmaker Larry Cohen | Himself | |
| 2021 | Gunfight at Dry River | John 'Boone' Hawkins | |
| 2022 | The Phantoms | Mr. Hendricks | |
| 2023 | Of Things Past | Michael Dietrich | Filmed in 1985 |

=== Television ===
| Year | Title | Role | Notes |
|---|---|---|---|
| 1973 | A Summer Without Boys | Abe Battle | TV movie |
| 1973 | The Glass Menagerie | Jim O'Connor | Primetime Emmy Award for Outstanding Supporting Actor in a Miniseries or Movie |
| 1977 | The Deadliest Season | Gerry Miller | TV movie |
| 1978 | Holocaust | Erik Dorf | Golden Globe Award for Best Actor – Television Series Drama; Primetime Emmy Award for Outstanding Lead Actor in a Miniseries or Movie |
| 1978 | The Winds of Kitty Hawk | Wilbur Wright | TV movie |
| 1979 | Too Far to Go | Richard Maple | TV movie |
| 1986 | Cagney & Lacey | Patrick Lowell | Episode: "Act of Conscience" |
| 1986 | Hotel | Brad Carlton | Episode: "Heroes" |
| 1987 | The Equalizer | Dr. Peter Kapik | Episode: "Encounter in a Closed Room" |
| 1988 | The Twilight Zone | Warren Cribbens | Episode: "20/20 Vision" |
| 1988 | Windmills of the Gods | President Paul Ellison | TV movie |
| 1988 | Frank Nitti: The Enforcer | Hugh Kelly | TV movie |
| 1989 | The Equalizer | Wayne "Seti" Virgil | Episode: "Starfire"; Nominated: Primetime Emmy Award for Outstanding Guest Actor in a Drama Series |
| 1989 | Tailspin: Behind the Korean Airliner Tragedy | USAF Major Hank Daniels | TV movie |
| 1990–1994 | Law & Order | Benjamin Stone | Main cast (Seasons 1–4); Nominated: Golden Globe Award for Best Actor – Television Series Drama; Nominated: Primetime Emmy Award for Outstanding Lead Actor in a Drama Series (1991–94) |
| 1993 | Born Too Soon | Fox Butterfield | TV movie |
| 1995 | Children of the Dust | John Maxwell | Miniseries, main cast |
| 1996 | Crime of the Century | Governor Harold Hoffman | TV movie |
| 1997–1999 | PSI Factor: Chronicles of the Paranormal | Michael Kelly | Recurring role (Seasons 2–3) |
| 1997 | Dead Man's Gun | John Pike | Episode: "Death Warrant" |
| 1997 | The Arrow | President Dwight D. Eisenhower | TV movie |
| 1998 | Poltergeist: The Legacy | Major Robert "Johnathan" Boyle | Episode: "Father to Son" |
| 1998 | Touched by an Angel | Dr. Charles Crayton | Episode: "Seek and Ye Shall Find" |
| 1998 | Emily of New Moon | Douglas Starr | 3 episodes |
| 1999 | Strange World | Unknown | Episode: "Pilot" |
| 2000 | The Adventures of Jules Verne | Dr. Draco | Episode: "The Eyes of Lazzaro" |
| 2000 | Children of My Heart | Rodrique Eymard | TV movie |
| 2000 | The Outer Limits | Solicitor-General Wallace Gannon | Episode: "Final Appeal" |
| 2001 | Mentors | William Randolph Hearst | Episode: "Citizen Cates" |
| 2001 | James Dean | Winton Dean | TV movie Primetime Emmy Award for Outstanding Supporting Actor in a Miniseries or a Movie |
| 2002 | Stephen King's Dead Zone | Reverend Gene Purdy | Episode: "Unaired Pilot" |
| 2002 | Taken | Colonel Thomas Campbell | Episode: "Beyond the Sky" |
| 2002 | Just Cause | Dr. Hamilton Whitney | Episode: "Death's Detail" |
| 2004 | The 4400 | Orson Bailey | Episode: "Pilot" |
| 2006 | Masters of Horror | Jim Wheeler | Episode: "Pick Me Up" |
| 2006 | 12 Hours to Live | Donald Saunders | TV movie |
| 2006 | Deadly Skies | General Dutton | TV movie |
| 2006 | Santa Baby | T.J. Hamilton | TV movie |
