= Laurene Landon =

Canadian actress (born 1957)

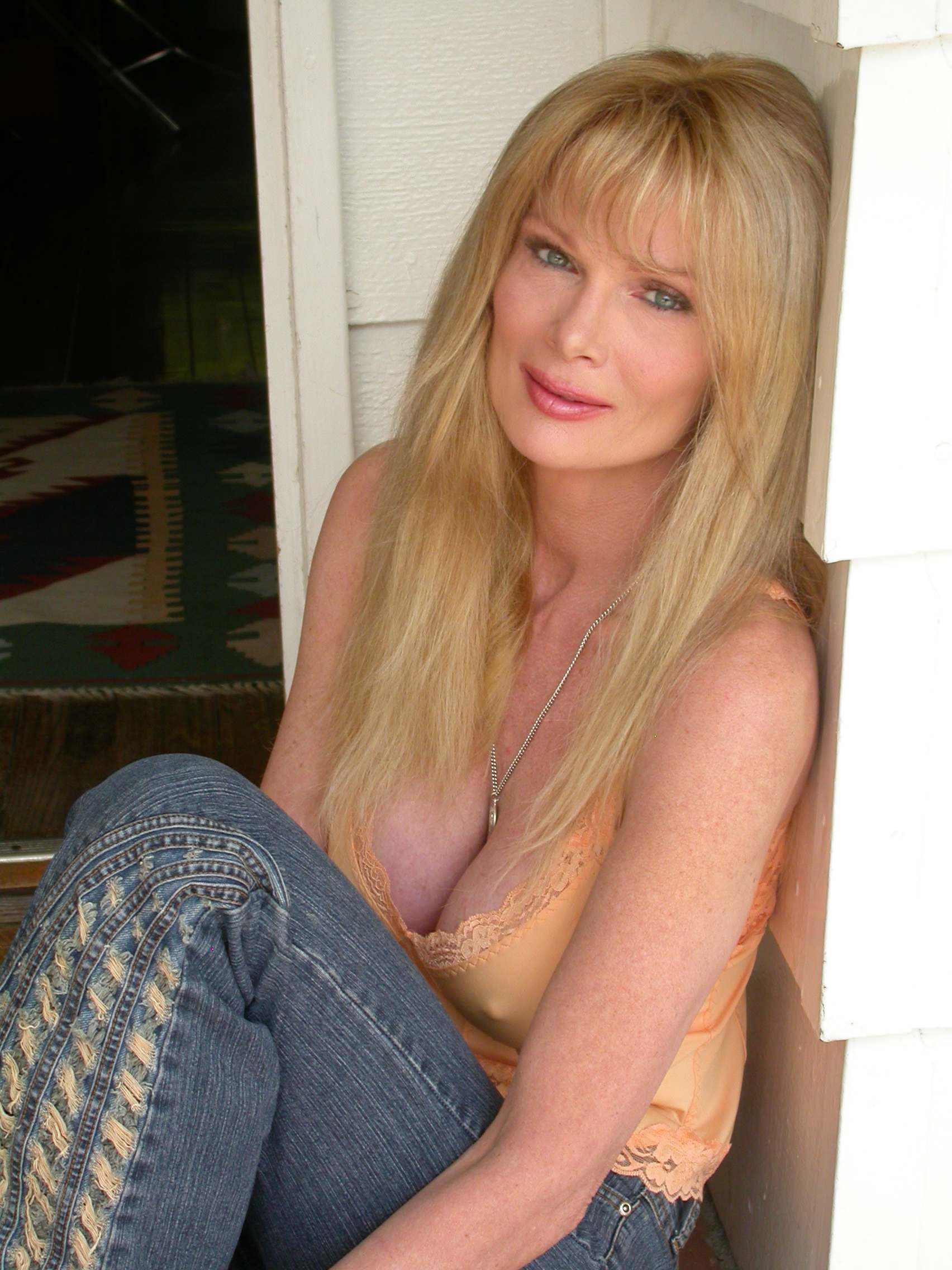
- Landon in 2008
- Born: Laurene Landon Coughlin; March 17, 1957 (age 69); Toronto, Ontario, Canada
- Occupation: Actress
- Years active: 1979–present

Laurene Landon Coughlin (born March 17, 1957) is a Canadian film and television actress. She first began appearing in movies in the 1980s. She is best known for her roles in Maniac Cop (1988) and Maniac Cop 2 (1990), ...All the Marbles (1981), Airplane II: The Sequel (1982), I, the Jury (1982) and Hundra (1983).

== Early life ==
Born in Toronto, Ontario, she attended California State University and began training in their police academy program, but decided that law enforcement was not for her when she came to the realization that she might someday have to use a gun. So she decided to try her hand at acting and began her career as an extra in films.

== Career ==
Landon began acting in a bit part in 1979's Bitter Heritage, also released as Naked in My Grave. She was cast as a featured skater in Roller Boogie in that same year. She gained a small role in 1981's Full Moon High, her first of many collaborations with director Larry Cohen. She spent part of her early career as a model and in 1980 was a runner-up in the Miss Black Velvet pageant in Las Vegas. There, a casting director told her to go see another casting director in Los Angeles, regarding a feature film called ...All the Marbles (alternate title, The California Dolls). As she found modeling boring and was unable to sit still for hours at a time, she took his suggestion and landed the role of "Molly" in the film.

Landon starred as Mike Hammer's right-hand woman Velda in Larry Cohen and Richard T. Heffron's acclaimed 1982 Mickey Spillane movie adaptation I, the Jury. She appeared in Airplane II: The Sequel (1982), Hundra (1983), Maniac Cop (1988), and Maniac Cop 2 (1990). She returned to film acting as "Birdy" in the 2005 television movie Masters of Horror: Pick Me Up, followed by small or uncredited roles in the films Stand Up (2007) and Drive (2011). She appeared in Alien Vampz and Alien Vampz 2, as well as the comedy Strap-Off. In 2015, she played Detective Higgins in Samurai Cop 2: Deadly Vengeance, had a supporting role in the feature film Day Out of Days, and appeared in Sky. She had a starring role in the 2017 film, Syndicate Smashers.

== Filmography and television ==
| Year | Film/TV Show | Role | Other notes |
|---|---|---|---|
| 1979 | Bitter Heritage | | aka Naked in My Grave |
| 1979 | Scoring | Marsha | |
| 1979 | Roller Boogie | Featured skater | |
| 1981 | ...All the Marbles | Molly | reissued as The California Dolls |
| 1981 | Full Moon High | Blondie | |
| 1982 | Airplane II: The Sequel | Testa, shuttle stewardess | |
| 1982 | I, the Jury | Velda | |
| 1983 | Hundra | Hundra | |
| 1984 | Yellow Hair and the Fortress of Gold | Yellow Hair | |
| 1985 | The Stuff | Cameo appearance in The Stuff commercial | |
| 1986 | Armed Response | Deborah Silverstein | |
| 1986 | America 3000 | Vena | |
| 1987 | It's Alive III: Island of the Alive | Sally | |
| 1988 | Maniac Cop | Teresa Mallory | |
| 1989 | Wicked Stepmother | Vanilla | |
| 1989 | A Hollywood Story | | Guest star |
| 1990 | The Ambulance | Patty | |
| 1990 | Maniac Cop 2 | Teresa Mallory | |
| 2005 | Masters of Horror: Pick Me Up | Birdy | |
| 2007 | Stand Up | Hippie Woman | |
| 2011 | Drive | actress | uncredited |
| 2013 | Knife to a Gunfight | Barry | |
| 2014 | Electric Boogaloo: The Wild, Untold Story of Cannon Films | Herself | Documentary on the story of The Cannon Group |
| 2015 | Hunter | Major Sintel | |
| 2015 | Day Out of Days | Anne Malone | |
| 2015 | Sky | Charlene | |
| 2015 | Samurai Cop 2: Deadly Vengeance | Detective Higgins | |
| 2016 | Enter the Samurai | Herself | Documentary on the creation of Samurai Cop 2: Deadly Vengeance |
| 2017 | Syndicate Smasher | Detective Carol Driscoll | |
| 2019 | Nation's Fire | Myra | |
| 2020 | Sorrow's Way | Opal | pre-production |
| 2022 | Staycation | Tabitha Musgraves | |
| 2022 | The Once and Future Smash | Herself | |
| 2023 | The Devil's Left Hand | Mother Stann | |
