= It's Alive (1974 film) =

1974 film by Larry Cohen

- 1977 theatrical re-release poster
- Directed by: Larry Cohen
- Written by: Larry Cohen
- Produced by: Larry Cohen
- Starring: John P. Ryan; Sharon Farrell; James Dixon; William Wellman Jr.; Shamus Locke; Andrew Duggan; Guy Stockwell; Michael Ansara
- Cinematography: Fenton Hamilton
- Edited by: Peter Honess
- Music by: Bernard Herrmann
- Production company: Larco Productions
- Distributed by: Warner Bros.
- Release dates: April 26, 1974 (Woods Theatre, Chicago); October 18, 1974 (U.S.)
- Running time: 91 minutes
- Country: United States
- Language: English
- Budget: $500,000
- Box office: $7.1 million

It's Alive is a 1974 American science fiction horror film written, produced, and directed by Larry Cohen. It stars John P. Ryan and Sharon Farrell as a couple whose infant child turns out to be a vicious mutant. The film's cast also includes James Dixon, William Wellman Jr., Shamus Locke, Andrew Duggan, Guy Stockwell, and Michael Ansara. The baby was designed and created by special effects make-up artist Rick Baker, and the film's score was composed by Bernard Herrmann.

It's Alive was distributed by Warner Bros. and received mixed reviews upon release. It spawned two sequels, It Lives Again (1978) and It's Alive III: Island of the Alive (1987), as well as a 2009 remake. It is the only film in the It's Alive series with a PG rating as the remainder of the series all have the R rating.

== Plot ==
In Los Angeles, Frank Davis and his wife Lenore are expecting their second child. Frank is a successful PR consultant, and his wife is a stay-at-home mom for their first child, Chris. The couple avoided having a child for several years while Lenore took contraceptive pills. When their child is ready to be born, they leave Chris with a family friend, Charley, and go to the hospital. Their second child, a baby boy, is born monstrously deformed, with fangs and claws. Immediately after birth, it kills the doctors and nurses in the delivery room and flees through a skylight. Lenore is left alive, screaming for her child as a horrified Frank discovers the carnage.

Frank and Lenore are allowed to leave the hospital while the police, including Lt. Perkins, investigate the killings. Frank and Lenore receive attention from the press, which results in Frank being fired from his job. Meanwhile, the Davis' baby lurks around outdoors, killing several people, including a milkman. As the killings continue, the press and the police hound Frank and Lenore. Frank meets with medical researchers who convince him to sign documents allowing them to experiment on the child's body once it has been found and killed. Frank denies that the child is his son and joins the hunt for the murderous infant.

An executive of a pharmaceutical company contacts the doctor who prescribed the contraceptive pills to Lenore. The executive acknowledges that the pills may have caused the child's mutation. He tells the doctor that the child must be destroyed to prevent the discovery of the company's liability. Meanwhile, the child makes its way to a school. Frank learns of the child's location and arrives at the school, where police officers are present. Frank informs Lt. Perkins that Chris attends the school. The baby attacks and kills an officer in a classroom before escaping through a window into the night.

Later, Frank discovers that Lenore is hiding the infant in the basement of their home. Chris runs away from Charley's house to get back home, and Charley drives after him. Lenore pleads with Frank and promises that the baby will not hurt their family. Frank, armed with a gun, enters the basement, where he finds Chris talking to the baby and promising to protect him. Frank shoots at the baby, injuring it. The infant flees the basement and bites Charley on the neck, killing him.

The police track the infant into the storm sewers, where Frank hunts him with a rifle. When he finds the baby, he realizes that it is frightened. He apologizes to the child and picks him up. Wrapping the baby in his coat, Frank tries to elude the police, but a mob of armed cops confronts him as he exits the sewers. He pleads for them to study the child, but not to harm him. A fertility doctor shouts at the police to kill him. The child suddenly leaps from Frank's arms and attacks the doctor as the cops open fire, killing both the infant and the doctor. As the police escort away the grieving Davises, a depressed Lt. Perkins receives news that another similar mutant baby has been born in Seattle.

== Cast ==
- John P. Ryan as Frank Davis
- Andrew Duggan as the Professor
- Sharon Farrell as Lenore Davis
- Guy Stockwell as Bob Clayton
- James Dixon as Lieutenant Perkins
- Michael Ansara as the Captain
- William Wellman Jr. as Charley
- Robert Emhardt as the Executive
- Shamus Locke as the Doctor
- Daniel Holzman as Chris Davis

== Production ==
Special effects make-up artist Rick Baker designed and created the murderous baby depicted in the film. Larry Cohen, who wrote, produced and directed the film, called Baker on the telephone while Baker was at the home of Dick Smith, where he was working on effects for the 1973 film The Exorcist. During that initial phone call, Cohen pitched the concept of the film to Baker, and suggested building a baby suit that could be worn by Cohen's cat, or "a chicken or something [...] maybe two chickens!"

Baker next heard from Cohen two weeks after filming had begun. Cohen had decided to rarely show the infant in the film, and asked Baker to create a "dummy baby" for the actors to react to. Baker constructed the baby with an aluminum wire armature, allowing for articulated limbs and adjustable eyeballs. For close-up shots, Baker created a full-head mutant infant mask, a pair of gloves, and a partial body suit, which were worn by Baker's then-girlfriend and later wife, Elaine Parkyn.

== Release ==
The film had a complicated release through Warner Bros. beginning in 1974. Upon completing the film, Cohen found the executives who had backed the production had been replaced and the new executives showed little interest in the project. The studio gave the film a one theater run in April—May 1974 in Chicago. It was then given a limited release beginning October 18, 1974. The film drew respectable business, but the company still did not fully support the project. Three years after its original release, Warner Bros. saw another change in executives and Cohen asked the new group to review the film.

It's Alive was reissued in March 1977 with a new advertisement campaign. The updated 1977 TV advertisement features a baby carriage, accompanied by the lullaby "Rock-a-bye Baby" and a voice-over that says, "There's only one thing wrong with the Davis baby. It's alive." The new ad drew people into theaters, ultimately earning Warner Bros. $7.1 million in U.S. domestic rentals.

=== Critical response ===
On the review aggregator website Rotten Tomatoes, It's Alive holds an approval rating of 67% based on 24 critic reviews and has an average rating of 6/10. The site's critical consensus reads, "Tough and unpleasant, It's Alive throttles the viewer with its bizarre mutant baby theatrics." On Metacritic, which assigns a normalized rating to reviews, the film has a weighted average score of 72 out of 100 based on six reviews, indicating "generally favorable" reviews.

Vincent Canby of The New York Times wrote, "Mr. Cohen is not unintelligent, but the few interesting ideas in his horror films, including the recent Demon, are drenched in supreme silliness by way of the dialogue and special effects." A review published in Variety called it a "stomach-churning little film", praising Herrmann's "highly effective" score but criticizing the film's script as being too far-fetched. Gene Siskel of the Chicago Tribune gave the film one out of four stars, lambasting it as "imbecilic". Kevin Thomas of the Los Angeles Times called it "a sort of primitive low-budget sequel — rip-off may be the better word — to Rosemary's Baby. Despite patches of risible dialogue and other ludicrous bits and pieces it holds attention and even manages to be pretty scary." Tom Milne of The Monthly Film Bulletin wrote, "Attitudes to horror films being what they are, it's a fairly safe bet that John Ryan won't get the credit he so richly deserves for an outstanding performance which brings It's Alive within striking distance of Night of the Living Dead."

Leonard Maltin gave It's Alive two-and-a-half out of four stars, commending Herrmann's score but noting that the film is "not for all tastes." A review published by TV Guide awarded the film three out of five stars, reading, "Part visceral horror flick and part Oedipal allegory, It's Alive explores a widely repressed but crucial element of family life—parents' ambivalence toward their children—and satirizes society's cavalier treatment of its youngest members." A review published by Time Out reads, "Despite such potentially sidesplitting material, the film often manages to instill a genuinely chilling atmosphere, with its initially kitsch family growing into human beings as they plummet into a world unhinged and apart at the seams." Dennis Schwartz of Ozus' World Movie Reviews gave It's Alive a grade of "A," praising Ryan's performance and calling the film "a wacky low-grade entertaining horror pic, one that also has an edge, is discomforting and surprisingly has a good blend of humor and splatter."

=== Home media ===
Warner Home Video released It's Alive on VHS and, on October 5, 2004, on DVD.

On May 15, 2018, Shout! Factory released a three-disc Blu-ray box set of the It's Alive trilogy. This set contains It's Alive, as well as its sequels It Lives Again and It's Alive III: Island of the Alive.

== Related works ==
=== Novelization ===
The novelizations of the first film and its sequels expound on the dangers of various prescription drugs administered to expectant mothers during the 1950s and early 1960s (e.g. thalidomide), the use of fertility drugs, and the indirect use of pesticides on people. In the story, the mother of the first mutant child had a history of taking combined oral contraceptive pills prior to planning her second pregnancy, whereupon she instead began taking an inadequately tested fertility drug to facilitate the conception of her second child.

=== Sequels and remake ===
It's Alive was followed by two sequels, It Lives Again (1978) and It's Alive III: Island of the Alive (1987). A remake was released in 2009.

== See also ==
- List of American films of 1974
