= It's Alive III: Island of the Alive =

- Theatrical release poster
- Directed by: Larry Cohen
- Written by: Larry Cohen
- Produced by: Paul Stader
- Starring: Michael Moriarty; Karen Black; Laurene Landon; James Dixon; Gerrit Graham; Macdonald Carey; Neal Israel
- Cinematography: Daniel Pearl
- Edited by: David Kern
- Music by: Laurie Johnson
- Production company: Larco Productions
- Distributed by: Warner Bros. Pictures
- Release date: May 27, 1987
- Running time: 95 minutes
- Country: United States
- Language: English

It's Alive III: Island of the Alive is a 1987 American science fiction horror film written and directed by Larry Cohen. It is the sequel to the 1978 film It Lives Again. The film stars Michael Moriarty, Karen Black, Laurene Landon, James Dixon, Gerrit Graham, Macdonald Carey and Neal Israel. The film was released by Warner Bros. Pictures in May 1987.

== Plot ==
Several years after the first two films' events, a woman goes into labor in a cab on a rainy night. Panicked, the cab driver seeks out a police officer to assist in the birth before searching for a public phone to call an ambulance. While he's away, the woman gives birth to a mutant baby. Recognizing it as a mutant child like those from the prior films, the officer tries to shoot and kill the infant, who reacts by killing the officer and mother. The following day, the mutant baby's corpse is found inside a Catholic church, where it dragged itself to die.

In a courtroom, Stephen Jarvis is pleading for the court to spare his mutant son's life, who he argues acts aggressively because it's reacting to the hostility of the people and chaos surrounding him. The baby breaks out of its cage, but Jarvis calms it, convincing the judge to spare the child and four others like him by quarantining them on a remote deserted island. After the trial, Jarvis is a social pariah, unable to work his former acting job and the child's mother, Ellen, wants to live her own life without him as if she never gave birth. Jarvis soon becomes remarkably bitter, as he can't pay his legal fees and women want nothing to do with him, afraid that he'll pass on the mutation through casual touch. Aware that the babies are still alive and the mutations were a side effect of a medication his pharmaceutical company produced, Cabot and some of his associates travel to the island. They hope to kill the babies to manufacture the drug under a new label, only for the mutant babies to kill and eat the entire party.

Five years later, Lt. Perkins approaches Jarvis, telling him that Dr. Swenson has recruited him to launch an expedition to the island to study the babies' growth and wants Jarvis to accompany them. The trip proves to be disastrous; only Jarvis and Perkins survive - Perkins has been deserted on the island while Jarvis remains on the boat as the mutants' captive as they want to travel to Cape Vale, Florida. While traveling, Jarvis realizes that the babies grew quickly and have reached adulthood, as one of them has given birth to a baby, with the father implied to be Jarvis's son. Jarvis discerns that the mutants communicate with each other telepathically. He also determines that the only reason he's still alive is because of the existence of the ship's sailing crew's bodies and because his son has been protecting him. He also realizes that the children are traveling to find Ellen. Eventually, their ship comes across another vessel, at which point Jarvis's son throws his father overboard to save his life, expecting that the ship will pick him up.

When Jarvis awakens, he finds himself held captive in Cuba but manages to convince his captors of his identity, that the mutant children pose a danger to those around them, and to get them to take him back home. Meanwhile, the children arrive in the United States, where they promptly kill several people they consider a threat to either them or Ellen while also defending a woman being attacked by killing a gang of punks. Ultimately both Jarvis and the mutants find Ellen, upon which point the mutants try to get her to take the child. Initially reluctant, Ellen accepts the child after Jarvis convinces that the mutants looked for her out of love for their child, as they're dying of measles and would be unable to care for the child and because they strongly instinctually associated her with motherhood. The two accept the child just as its parents die from measles, while the final remaining adult mutant distracts the police, allowing Jarvis and Ellen to escape. The film ends with the two driving away together with the child, searching for a safe place to raise it.

== Cast ==
- Michael Moriarty as Stephen Jarvis
- Rick Garia as Tony
- Ann Dane as Dr. Morrell
- Karen Black as Ellen Jarvis
- Carlos Palomino as first Cuban
- William Watson as Cabot
- Laurene Landon as Sally
- Tony Abatemarco as second Cuban
- C.L. Sussex as Hunter
- James Dixon as Lt. Perkins
- Gladys Portugues as waitress
- Patch Mackenzie as Robbins
- Gerrit Graham as Ralston
- Joanne Lara as second waitress
- John Woehrle as first cop
- Macdonald Carey as Judge Watson
- Bobby Ramsen as TV Host
- Lauri Riley as medic
- Neal Israel as Dr. Brewster
- Jill Gatsby as girl in cab
- Marilyn Staley as Miss Garson
- Art Lund as Dr. Swenson
- Kevin O'Connor as cab driver
- Mitchell Edmonds as Stewart

== Production ==
Larry Cohen later said the film began when he went to Warner Bros. Pictures with Andre de Toth and pitched them the idea of remaking House of Wax (1953). Warner was not interested. However the studio wanted Cohen to make a film for their video division. Cohen was only willing to do this if Warner would pay for two films, to be shot back-to-back. Warner agreed. The two films were sequels to It's Alive and Salem's Lot. Both had built-in name recognition ideal for the straight-to-video market.

It was Cohen's third It's Alive film.

I thought if I was going to make a third movie, I had to follow this story through to some kind of new and satisfying resolution. So, I asked myself some questions: what are these babies like as adults? What is the monster going to look like when it physically develops and ages? I thought those were important questions to answer and deal with. Otherwise, there was no point in making the movie if I was just going to have a load of monster babies running around again, killing people. The second film was, to a degree, different from the first because the protagonists were trying to save the monsters. In the third film, we got all of the monster birth stuff out of the way in the prologue and gave the audience their horror. The rest of the movie was more of an exploration of Jarvis' character and the progress of the monster children. I thought that differentiation from the events of the previous pictures made Island of the Alive a worthwhile project.

Cohen says the theme of the film were encapsulated in one of the opening scenes, where Michael Moriarty's character argues for his son's existence:

That scene was really what this film was about: whether or not society was going to permit these creatures to live or if it would destroy them. Such an important question would have to be decided by a jury's prudence and so the idea of beginning our story with a courtroom trial made perfect sense to me. I liked the idea of commencing the film with a direct moral question. I thought it was a legitimate and challenging opening as the monsters’ very existence was at stake. The monsters are eventually removed from society and quarantined on an island where they will come of age in isolation. In that regard, Island of the Alive is different from It’s Alive and It Lives Again, as I wanted to try something that had a contrasting tone and thrust to the whole story. You’ll no doubt notice that there is much more humour in the third film than in the previous two pictures.

The film was filmed on location in Kauai, Hawaii.

James Dixon reprises his role as Lt. Perkins from the previous two films in this It's Alive film series. His character is the only one that appears in all three films. Others, like Frank Davis and Eugene Scott, were just mentioned in the film.

It was Larry Cohen's third film with Michael Moriarty. The director deliberately encouraged his star to play the role in an eccentric manner:

I always like to make use of Moriarty's bravery and his willingness to give a way-out, individualistic performance. Your average actor will just give you a straightdown-the-line performance, but Moriarty takes big chances. You'll find that when you are adventurous as an actor and take big chances, you often get good results... Moriarty is not the kind of actor who needs to dress up to inhabit a character. He has such great instincts and abilities, it just all comes out. I thought the character of Jarvis in Island of the Alive and Moriarty’s performance was terrific. He had a controlled insanity about him, but that character is not without humanity and courage. The way Jarvis comes out and makes fun of himself, and everybody else around him, makes the entire situation seem insane. Obviously, in reality, it would be an insane situation if you and your wife had given birth to this monster child.

== Release and Reception ==
The film was released on home video on August 31, 1994. "It's Alive III: Island of the Alive" received a negative to mixed reception. It has a 44% rating on Rotten Tomatoes based on nine reviews.
