= The Stuff =

1985 film by Larry Cohen

- Theatrical release poster
- Directed by: Larry Cohen
- Written by: Larry Cohen
- Produced by: Paul Kurta
- Starring: Michael Moriarty; Andrea Marcovicci; Garrett Morris; Paul Sorvino
- Cinematography: Paul Glickman
- Edited by: Armand Lebowitz
- Music by: Anthony Guefen; Richard Seaman (jingles)
- Distributed by: New World Pictures
- Release date: June 14, 1985
- Running time: 87 minutes
- Country: United States
- Language: English
- Budget: $1.7 million

The Stuff is a 1985 American science fiction horror film written and directed by Larry Cohen and starring Michael Moriarty, Garrett Morris, Andrea Marcovicci, and Paul Sorvino. The film follows the discovery of a mysterious, sweet, and addictive substance becoming a popular dessert in the United States but soon begins attacking people and turning them into zombies. Cohen cited consumerism, unhealthy foods, and potentially hazardous products as his influences for writing this film's story.

The film was the subject of a legal dispute, Effects Associates v. Cohen. Effects Associates sued Cohen, but the trial court ruled in favor of Cohen. In 1990, the United States Court of Appeals for the Ninth Circuit ruled that Effects Associates held the copyright of the footage for use outside of The Stuff.

When the film was released, it did not perform well. Later, critics praised its acting, story, and performances, and it has been compared to The Blob and The Substance and regarded by film scholars and critics as a cult classic satire on American consumerism, mass media, and health foods.

== Plot ==
Several quarry workers in Georgia discover a white cream-like substance bubbling out of the ground. Said to be addictive and sweet, the substance, marketed as "The Stuff", is sold to the general public in containers much like ice cream or yogurt. Despite nobody knowing what it is and having zero calories, The Stuff becomes a nationwide hit. One night, a young boy named Jason discovers that The Stuff appears to be alive. Despite his efforts to convince his family, they dismiss him, continuing to consume it and nothing else. Later, he is arrested by a sheriff at a supermarket after vandalizing The Stuff's displays. The Stuff continues growing in popularity, with many becoming obsessed with it.

Former FBI agent-turned-industrial saboteur David "Mo" Rutherford is hired by the leaders of the suffering ice cream industry to find out exactly what The Stuff is and eradicate it. Rutherford bands together with junk food mogul Charles W. "Chocolate Chip Charlie" Hobbs, who has lost control of his company and is now living in poverty. At the town's post office, both find the owner—a regular consumer of The Stuff—dead. They learn the item's secret: The Stuff is actually a living, parasitic extraterrestrial organism that gradually takes over the brain and mutates those who eat it into zombie-like creatures, which it then uses to make more of itself before bursting out of their bodies and leaving empty husks behind. The Stuff's weakness is that it is susceptible to fire, and Mo uses this to escape several traps set by The Stuff and zombies.

Rutherford eventually saves Jason and pairs with his lover, Nicole Kendall, an advertising executive. The trio infiltrates the distribution plant, an organized corporate effort to spread The Stuff to eliminate world hunger. Then they use explosives to destroy the lake where The Stuff is being extracted. Meanwhile, United States Army Colonel Malcolm Grommett Spears, a retired soldier, teams up with the trio and leads a militia in battling the zombies and transmitting a civil defense message for Americans to break their addiction to The Stuff by destroying it with fire. However, as they attempt to broadcast their warning, a mass of The Stuff bursts out of a zombified Charlie's throat, cornering Nicole and Jason in a recording booth. Rutherford electrocutes The Stuff, burning it, and then they make their national broadcast. The Stuff's popularity quickly plummets as the public rallies to destroy all supplies. With the crisis seemingly averted, Rutherford, Nicole, Jason, and Colonel Spears are hailed as national heroes.

Mo then visits the head of The Stuff Company, Mr. Fletcher. He tells Mo that the destruction of the mine has not hurt his business since The Stuff exists in many areas, but Mo swears to rid the world of its existence. Mr. Fletcher then introduces Mr. Evans, the ice cream mogul who had initially hired Mo, alongside with whom he now works. They introduce a new product, "The Taste", a mixture of 88% ice cream and 12% The Stuff, supposedly enough to make people crave more without it taking over their minds. An undaunted Mo brings in Jason, carrying a box full of The Stuff containers. He holds both moguls at gunpoint and forces them to consume the product as punishment for the innocent lives they have destroyed with the product. As they eat, Rutherford inquires, "Are you eating it, or is it eating you?" After they finish, Mo and Jason leave them behind as police sirens can be heard approaching.

Smugglers sell The Stuff on the black market, where one of them tastes it. In a post-credits scene, a woman in a bathroom says, "Enough is never enough", while holding a cup of The Stuff.

== Cast ==
- Michael Moriarty as David "Mo" Rutherford
- Andrea Marcovicci as Nicole Kendall
- Garrett Morris as Charles W. "Chocolate Chip Charlie" Hobbs
- Paul Sorvino as Colonel Malcolm Grommett Spears
- Scott Bloom as Jason
- Danny Aiello as Mr. Vickers
- Patrick O'Neal as Fletcher
- Alexander Scourby as Evans
- Russell Nype as Richards
- Collette Blonigan as Jason's mother
- Frank Telfer as Jason's father
- Brian Bloom as Jason's brother
- John Newton as Howard
- Nicolas De Toth as Griswald
- Brooke Adams, Laurene Landon, Tammy Grimes, Abe Vigoda, Clara Peller, and Jason Evers as Stuff commercial guest stars
- Mira Sorvino as Factory Worker (uncredited); she had come to visit her father, Paul Sorvino, on set, and was used as an extra.

== Production ==
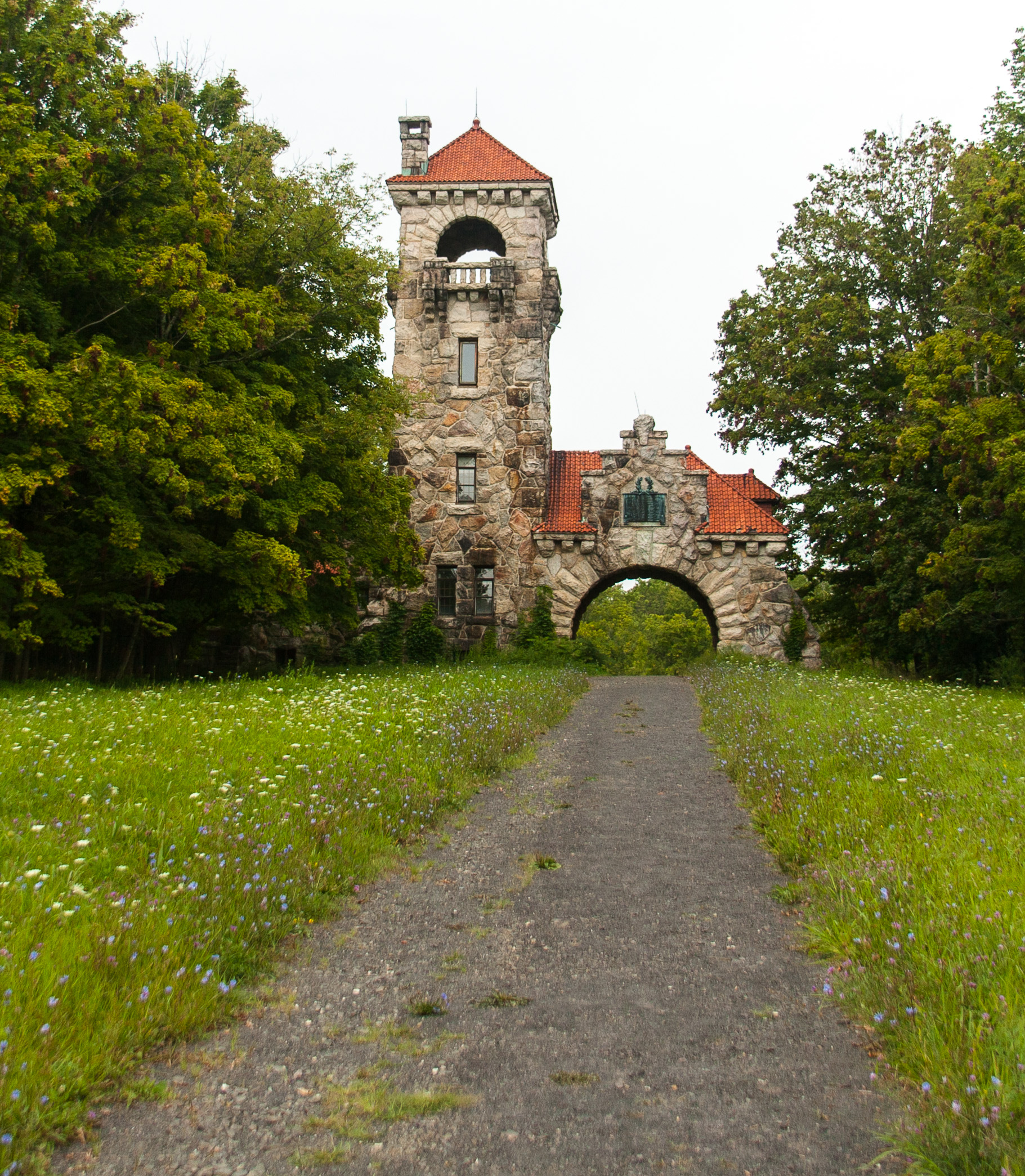
The gatehouse at the Mohonk Mountain House was featured in a scene in The Stuff.

On April 15, 1983, the Hollywood Reporter reported that the film was originally going to be titled Stuff! and the budget would be $10 million. Shooting for the film started in August 1984 and ended in September of that year. Filming locations included New Paltz, New York, New York City, and Los Angeles. Post-production began in January 1985 at Raleigh Studios in Los Angeles and continued into the summer. The Mohonk Mountain House gatehouse was notably used as Colonel Malcolm Grommett Spears' headquarters in the film.

Multiple puppets were used to simulate the deaths of characters who had become hosts of The Stuff. Four models of Garrett Morris's head were made for Charlie's transformation sequence, one of which Cohen still claimed to own. When The Stuff was eaten on screen, Tofutti, yogurt, and whipped cream were used. For visual effect, mashed potato flakes, polyurethane foam, and firefighting foam were used. Because fish bones made up the firefighting foam, it had a fetid odor.

The script was an original story by Cohen. He commented on consumerism in the United States and called some of the products being sold "damaging". He said that he frequently read about product recalls because of these products "harming people" and cited unhealthy foods as an example of this phenomenon. He cited the consumption of "junk food" and its effects as his influence. He questioned how this consumption could be detrimental.

Cohen wanted to cast Arsenio Hall as "Chocolate Chip Charlie" W. Hobbs, since he thought he was not only a good actor but also a rising star. The executives at New World Pictures, however, wanted someone more recognizable and thus cast Garrett Morris instead. Morris did not enjoy working with Cohen; in a "Random Roles" section at The A.V. Club where Morris was asked about The Stuff, he simply said that if he did not respect someone, he would not talk about them, and therefore he had nothing to say about Larry Cohen.

== Release ==
Cohen said the film was significantly trimmed in post-production. Although he and New World Pictures disagreed on the detail and pacing of the film, he agreed to increase the pacing of the film by removing some commercials and a romantic scene. Cohen did not believe the deleted scenes would work in the final product, but he called the process of removing scenes he favored "painful".

Cohen said that executives at New World Pictures preferred a film that was strictly in the horror genre and had heavy amounts of gore, but The Stuff seemed more satirical, humorous, and unconventional compared to other horror films. The comedic portrayals of the characters appeared to have "greatly diluted the horror element". He said that before the film was released, people in a different audience would favor this film instead of those in Cohen's target audience.

The film premiered at USA Film Festival on March 30, and it was theatrically released in the United States by New World Pictures, opening in several California cities on June 14, 1985.

The film did not perform well, and Cohen feels that it was hurt by the fact that it was sold as a horror film when it was basically a satirical comedy. Cohen stated, "the day The Stuff opened in New York a hurricane hit and the newspapers were not delivered. Of course, we had received all these great reviews, but it didn't matter because nobody ever got to read a single word of them."

=== Copyright dispute ===
The company Effects Associates was hired by Cohen to supply some of the special effects shots. When the shots were delivered, Cohen was not satisfied with shots of exploding factory buildings and paid only half (c. $8,000) of the agreed price for those shots. In Effects Associates v. Cohen, Effects Associates brought an action against Cohen in court to claim full compensation, but also because the parties had no written copyright agreement regarding the use of the shots. The trial court decided in favor of Cohen, ruling that a grant was "implied" for the non-exclusive use of the shots in the film. At the United States Court of Appeals for the Ninth Circuit in 1990, Cohen tried to say that under Section 204 of the Copyright Act, the transfer had to be written down, and this transfer was not in writing, but it did not apply to him. Judge Alex Kozinski, the presiding judge of the Court of Appeals for the Ninth Circuit at the time, said:

Section 204's writing requirement is not unduly burdensome; it necessitates neither protracted negotiations nor substantial expense. The rule is really quite simple: If the copyright holder agrees to transfer ownership to another party, that party must get the copyright holder to sign a piece of paper saying so. It doesn't have to be the Magna Charta; a one-line pro forma statement will do.

Consequently, the Court of Appeals of the Ninth Circuit rejected Cohen's statement, held summary judgment on the existence of an "implied license" that does not require writing, confirmed the ruling, and confirmed that Effects Associates still retained the copyright for use outside of The Stuff and could allow other parties to use the footage.

=== Home media ===
The film was released on VHS and Betamax in 1985 by New World Home Video. It was eventually released on DVD by Anchor Bay Entertainment in 2000. On September 20, 2011, Image Entertainment reissued The Stuff under its "Midnight Madness Series" banner on DVD.

A special Blu-ray was released in the United Kingdom and United States on April 19, 2016, by Arrow Films. On July 22, 2025, Arrow Films reissued the film in a limited edition 4K UHD Blu-ray set featuring the original theatrical cut as well as an earlier pre-release cut of the film. According to Jim Vorel of Paste Magazine, Denver Film discovered an additional 30 minutes of previously unreleased footage in 2021.

== Reception ==
Colin Greenland reviewed The Stuff for White Dwarf #77 and stated that "A brilliant performance by Cohen stalwart Michael Moriarty as an industrial spy after the truth holds the straggling plot together." It received positive reviews from critics: on review aggregator website Rotten Tomatoes, the film has a 68% rating, based on 19 reviews. According to Bruce Kawin and Tony Williams, The Stuff satirizes American consumerism, mass media, and health foods. Roger Crow of On: Yorkshire Magazine called the film a "schlock horror satire", praised Moriarty's performance, and said the film paid homage to "The Blob and Invasion of the Body Snatchers [and] went on to inspire cosmetics horror satire The Substance." He said the quality of the special effects and picture quality ranged from good to bad. He praised the performance, direction, script, and rewatchability of the film. Ian Berriman of SFX praised Moriarty for his ability to improvise in the film, calling him "delightfully idiosyncratic". Berriman also wrote that although many special effects did not look believable, they contributed to the appeal of the film. He lauded the Arrow Video 4K version as having previously unreleased footage of The Stuff added to the film, the "romance element [being] properly fleshed out", and the addition of an alternative soundtrack. Scott Tobias of A.V. Club called the film "conformity by the spoonful and the public laps it right up, even as they pay an awful price for their gluttony", and said that because of Moriarty's acting in one of Cohen's previous films, Q, Cohen provided dialogue that was appropriate for his delivery in the film.

Budd Wilkins of Slant Magazine called The Stuff "a barbed satire of 1980s consumer culture", commented on corporations' tendencies to solicit dangerous products to people, compared consumerism to addiction, and praised the performances of guest stars Abe Vigoda and Clara Peller. Peller, who appeared in the "Where's the beef" commercials for Wendy's, appears in a parody of these commercials in the film. Wilkins also called Moriarty's performance "deliriously jazzy", compared him to John Wayne, and commended quotes that Moriarty said in the film. When Wilkins reviewed the 4K UHD Blu-Ray release, he praised the improvements in the sound quality and the appearances of the colors and details. A writer for Film-Authority said that the cover could have looked like Street Trash, but remarked that Cohen did not make "mindless trash". That writer said that this film predates scandals similar to what Abscam was involved in, compared this film to The Substance, said there were "references to the KFC secret recipe as served by the Colonel", remarked on the titillation in the advertisements, said that the parody of the Wendy's commercials had its phrase become "Where's the Stuff", and noted, "British audiences might wonder out loud what happened to defunct products like Sunny D or Cremola Foam". The writer wrote that although satire finds little favor, the film is "funny, sharp and satirical".

== Sources ==
- Doyle, Michael (2015). Larry Cohen: The Stuff of Gods and Monsters. Albany, Georgia: Bear Manor Media. ISBN 978-1-593-93850-5.
- Kawin, Bruce F. (2012). Horror and the Horror Film. New York City, New York: Anthem Press. ISBN 978-0-857-28449-5.
- Williams, Tony (2016). Larry Cohen: The Radical Allegories of an Independent Filmmaker (Revised ed.). Jefferson, North Carolina: McFarland & Company. ISBN 978-1-476-61819-7.
