= Joseph Adler =

American film director (1940–2020)

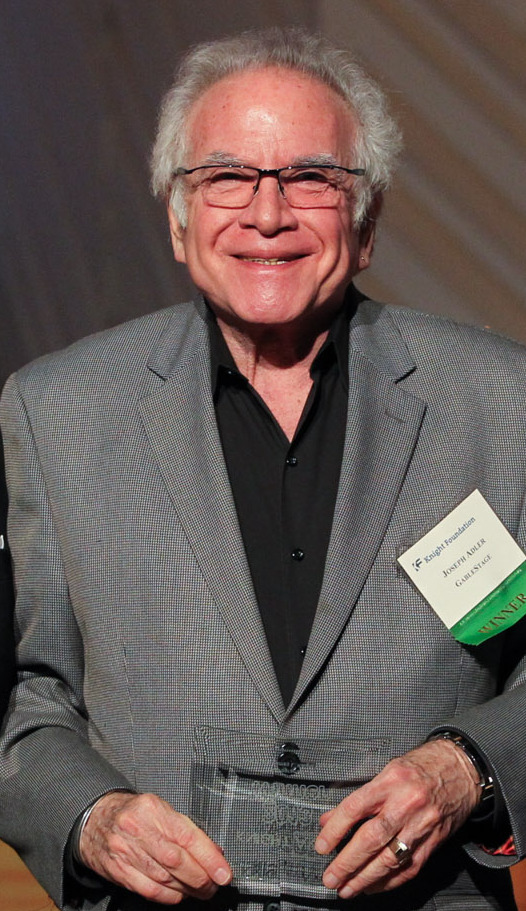
- Adler receives a Knight Arts Challenge award from the Knight Foundation in 2013
- Born: October 5, 1940; Brooklyn, New York, U.S.
- Died: April 16, 2020 (aged 79)
- Education: Carnegie Mellon University, New York University

Joseph Adler (October 5, 1940 – April 16, 2020) was an American theatre director.

== Early life ==
Adler was born in Brooklyn, New York. He studied drama at Carnegie Mellon University in Pittsburgh, and graduated from the Film Department at New York University.

== Career ==
Adler directed at many South Florida Theatres including: Coconut Grove Playhouse, New Theatre, Area Stage, Hollywood Boulevard Theatre, Players Theatre, Ruth Foreman Theatre, Florida Shakespeare Theatre, City Theatre, Hollywood Playhouse and Shores Performing Arts. Active in South Florida's film and theatre community for many years, he has directed hundreds of television commercials and industrial films – winning many awards, including the Clio. Other directorial credits include several independent feature films, a video version of the Broadway hit comedy Doubles and a cable TV series.

During Adler's tenure as Producing Artistic Director, GableStage was the recipient of 59 Carbonell Awards and 197 Carbonell nominations. He was nominated 21 times (14 at GableStage) and 10 times won the Carbonell Award for Best Director: The Shadow Box (Coconut Grove Playhouse); The Killing of Sister George (Players Theatre); A Lesson Before Dying, James Joyce's The Dead, Edward Albee's The Goat, Frozen, The Pillowman, Lieutenant of Inishmore, Ruined, and Adding Machine (GableStage).

As of the 2017–18 season, Adler was in his twentieth season at the GableStage in Coral Gables, Florida, in the Miami area. GableStage operates out of the historic Coral Gables Biltmore Hotel.

== Awards ==
Adler was awarded the George Abbott Award for "significant contributions to the artistic life and cultural development of greater Miami, Fort Lauderdale, and the Palm Beaches."

== Death ==
Adler died on April 17, 2020, following a long illness.
