= Q (1982 film) =

1982 horror film directed by Larry Cohen

Q – The Winged Serpent
- Theatrical release poster by Boris Vallejo
- Directed by: Larry Cohen
- Written by: Larry Cohen
- Produced by: Larry Cohen
- Starring: Michael Moriarty; Candy Clark; David Carradine; Richard Roundtree
- Cinematography: Fred Murphy
- Edited by: Armond Lebowitz
- Music by: Robert O. Ragland
- Production companies: Arkoff International Pictures; Larco Productions
- Distributed by: United Film Distribution Company
- Release date: October 8, 1982 (New York City)
- Running time: 93 minutes
- Country: United States
- Language: English
- Budget: $1.1 million
- Box office: $255,000

Q – The Winged Serpent (also known as Q) is a 1982 American monster horror crime movie written, co-produced and directed by Larry Cohen and starring Michael Moriarty, Candy Clark, David Carradine and Richard Roundtree. The film follows a petty swindler (Moriarty) who accidentally intrudes in a case involving a winged deity monster that poses a threat to New York City. He is the only person who has information that can help the police to stop the creature.

== Plot ==
The Aztec god Quetzalcoatl, a winged reptilian monster, takes up residence in the art-deco spire of the Chrysler Building, with frequent jaunts in the midday sun to devour various helpless New Yorkers on the rooftops. The resulting bloody mess confounds detectives, Shepard and Powell, who are already occupied with a case involving a series of bizarre ritual murders linked to a secret neo-Aztec cult.

Jimmy Quinn, a cheap, paranoid crook who wishes to be a jazz pianist, takes part in a botched diamond heist. Attempting to hide from police after the robbery, he stumbles upon the creature's lair atop the Chrysler building. Quinn abandons his attempts to settle down and leave his life of crime, deciding to extort from the city an enormous amount of money in exchange for directions to the creature's nest, which houses a colossal egg.

Quinn makes a deal with the city, $1 million for the location of the nest. He leads Shepard and a paramilitary assault team to the top of the Chrysler Building where they shoot the egg, killing the baby inside. Because the creature itself was not present in the nest, the city reneges on its offer to Quinn, taking back the $1 million and leaving him broke once again. Later, after killing Powell, the creature comes to the tower. After the showdown, the creature, riddled with bullets, falls onto the streets of Manhattan. Finally, Shepard shoots the Plumed Serpent's crazed priest (who had been committing the ritual murders) as he tries to kill Quinn to resurrect his "god". Ultimately, a second large egg hatches in a different location in the city.

== Cast ==
- Michael Moriarty as Jimmy Quinn
- Candy Clark as Joan
- David Carradine as Detective Shepard
- Richard Roundtree as Sergeant Powell
- James Dixon as Lieutenant Murray
- Malachy McCourt as Commissioner Nick McConnell
- Fred J. Scollay as Captain Fletcher
- Peter Hock as Detective Harold Kipps
- Ron Cey as Detective Hoberman
- Mary Louise Weller as Mrs. Pauley
- John Capodice as Doyle
- Tony Page as Webb
- Shelly Desai as Kahea
- Lee Louis as Officer Banyon
- Eddie Jones as The Watchman

== Production ==
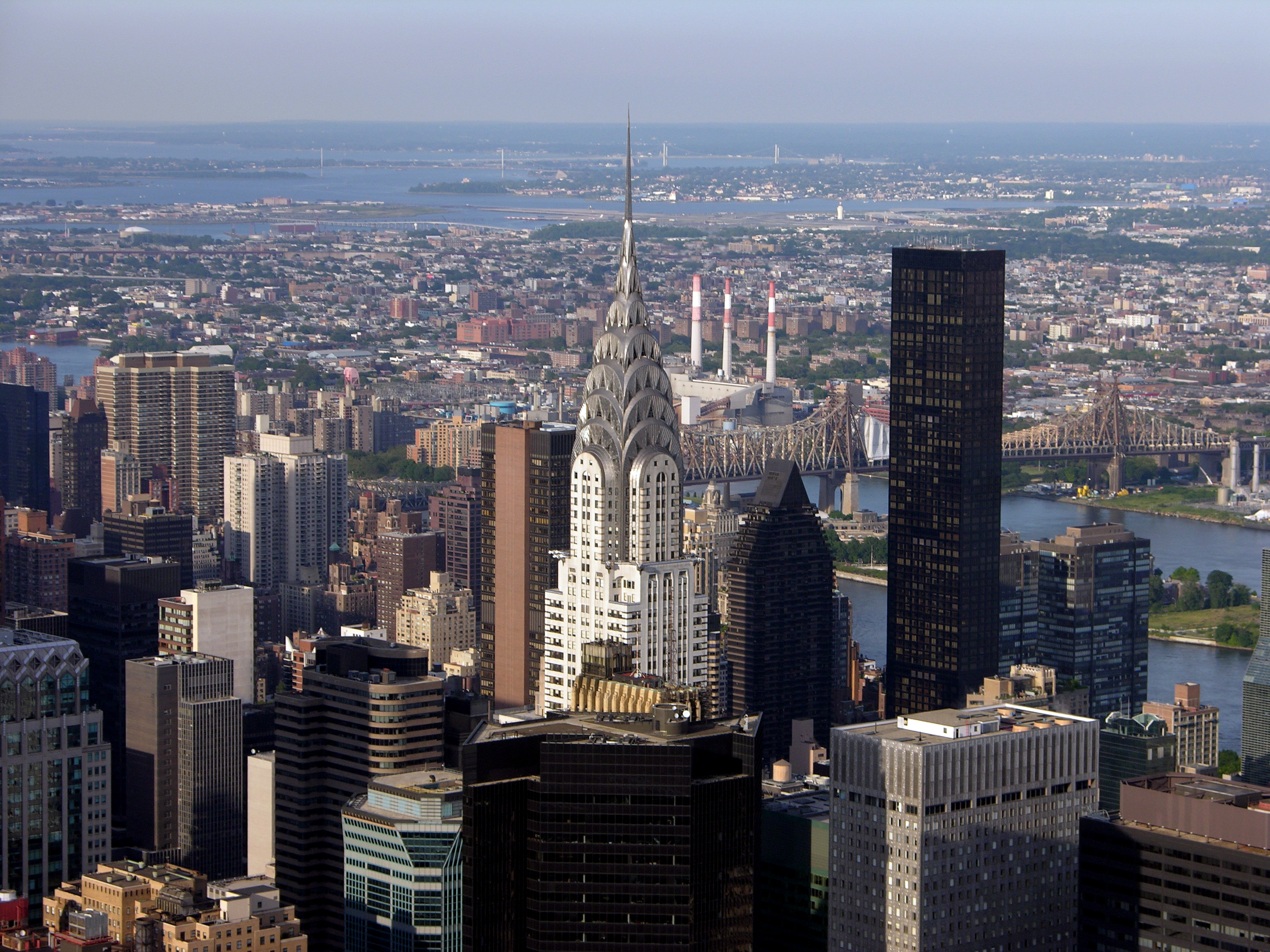
A major part of the film's shooting took place in The Chrysler Building

Q – The Winged Serpent was shot on location in and around New York City's Chrysler Building and uses the interior of the building's tower crown as a primary location. Though the owners initially refused to secure the building to the movie's production, they finally relented and agreed after they were offered an $18,000 (equivalent to $60,000 in 2025) fee. The overall production budget was over $1.1 million. The film's special effects for the flying serpent were done using stop-motion animation by Randall William Cook and David Allen.

According to writer-director Larry Cohen, Michael Moriarty's character Jimmy Quinn was not a failed piano player in the script, but when Cohen discovered Moriarty wrote and played music, he used it: "I wrote the extra scene where he auditions and fails to get the job. After that we just kept building on that".

== Release ==
The film was given a limited release theatrically in the United States by United Film Distribution Company beginning in New York City on October 8, 1982, the same date Twentieth Century-Fox would release I, The Jury. Q would gross approximately $255,000 at the box office.

=== Critical response ===
On the review aggregator website Rotten Tomatoes, Q – The Winged Serpent holds a 72% approval rating based on 29 reviews, with an average rating of 6.40/10. The consensus reads: "Q's campy charms may be lost on audiences who want their monsters frightening, but a game cast and lovingly retrograde visual effects give this kaiju romp some majesty."

Roger Ebert gave the film two-and-a-half out of four stars in his original review, saying it was a “silly monster movie” harkening back to similar films from the 1940s and ‘50s, and commending Moriarty's performance. Ebert relates the anecdote that, when movie reviewer Rex Reed met Q – The Winged Serpent's producer, Samuel Z. Arkoff, Reed told him: "What a surprise! All that dreck—and right in the middle of it, a great Method performance by Michael Moriarty!", while Arkoff replied: "The dreck was my idea." Colin Greenland reviewed Q – The Winged Serpent for Imagine, and stated: "It is not often that a film is enjoyable as a monster movie, a character study and a satire, but Q – The Winged Serpent scores on every one. As well as taking a few swipes at the police, the mass media, and big city politics, Larry Cohen cannot resist poking fun at the innumerable monsters that have gone chomping and stomping among the skyscrapers over the years." Gene Siskel awarded the film three out of four stars.

Film critics and journalists James Marriott and Kim Newman featured Q on their 2006 book The Definitive Guide to the Cinema of Fear. Although they criticized the film's pacing as moving "too fast", they felt that overall was entertaining. In his retrospective review, Chuck Bowen of Slant gave The Winged Serpent a rating of three out of five stars, praising Shout! Factory's 2013 restoration. In 2019, Screen Rant critic Rocco Thompson cited it as Larry Cohen's sixth essential film of his career.

=== Home media ===
The film was later released on VHS by MCA/Universal Home Video. It was released on DVD by Blue Underground in 2003. Shout! Factory released the film on Blu-ray on August 27, 2013, through their Scream Factory sublabel.

== See also ==
- The Flying Serpent
- The Giant Claw
- List of cult films
- Rodan (film)
