= Nebraska Legislature 3rd district =

American legislative district

Nebraska's 3rd legislative district
- Map of Nebraska Legislature districts with the 3rd district shaded in red
Senator
Victor Rountree; D–Bellevue
since 2025
- Demographics: 72.7% White; 5.3% Black; 16.9% Hispanic; 2.4% Asian; 0.7% Native American
- Population (2020): 38,656

The Nebraska Legislature's 3rd district is one of the 49 legislative districts in the Nebraska Legislature. The district is located in eastern Nebraska and covers part of northeastern Sarpy County. The area of Sarpy County it covers includes sections of Bellevue and Papillion, as well as unincorporated areas surrounding them. It is bounded on the east by District 45, the south by District 36, and the west by District 14. Victor Rountree has represented the district since 2025.

== Demographics ==
The US Census Bureau recorded the population as of 2020 at 38,656.

- 72.7% of the district is White.
- 16.9% of the district is Hispanic.
- 5.3% of the district is Black.
- 2.4% of the district is Asian.
- 0.7% of the district is Native American.

== List of representatives ==
Representative	Party	Years of service	Legislature	Residence
Victor Rountree	Democratic	2025 - present	109th	Bellevue
Carol Blood	Democratic	2017-2025	105th-108th	Bellevue
Tommy Garrett	Republican	2013-2017	103rd-104th	Bellevue
Scott Price	Republican	2009-2013*	101st-103rd	Gretna
Gail Kopplin	Democratic	2005-2009	99th-100th	Gretna
Ray Mossey	Republican	2002-2005	98th	Papillion
Jon Bruning	Republican	1997-2002*	95th-97th	Sarpy County
Michael T. Avery	Republican	1993-1997	93rd-94th	Gretna
Emil Beyer	Republican	1981-1993	87th-92nd	Gretna
Orval Keyes	Democratic	1973-1981	83rd-86th	Springfield
Orval Keyes	Republican	1969-1973*	79th-83rd	Papillion

- Scott Price resigned before his term ended. Tommy Garrett was appointed to fill the vacancy.
- Jon Bruning resigned before his term ended. Ray Mossey was appointed to fill the vacancy.
- Orval Keyes switched parties from Republican to Democratic in 1973.
