= Shooting Stars (1983 film) =

- Genre: Action; Comedy
- Written by: Michael Fisher
- Directed by: Richard Lang
- Starring: Billy Dee Williams; Parker Stevenson; John P. Ryan; Edie Adams; Fred Travalena
- Music by: Dominic Frontiere
- Country of origin: United States
- Original language: English

Production
- Executive producers: Douglas S. Cramer; Aaron Spelling; E. Duke Vincent
- Producer: Richard Lang
- Cinematography: Richard L. Rawlings
- Editors: Bob Bring; Marsh Hendry; John Woodcock
- Running time: 96 minutes
- Production company: Aaron Spelling Productions

Original release
- Network: ABC
- Release: July 28, 1983

Shooting Stars is a 1983 American made-for-television action comedy film starring Billy Dee Williams and Parker Stevenson.

It was the pilot for a proposed TV series which did not eventuate. However, it aired as a stand-alone TV movie on ABC on July 28, 1983.

== Plot ==
Two actors who play detectives are fired from their jobs. They decide to go into business as private investigators.

== Cast ==
- Billy Dee Williams as Douglas Hawke
- Parker Stevenson as Bill O'Keefe
- John P. Ryan as Detective Mcgee
- Edie Adams as Hazel
- Fred Travalena as Teddy
- Richard Bakalyan as Snuffy
- Tori Spelling as Frank Mcrae
- Frank McRae as Tubbs
- Robert Webber as J Woodrow Wilson
- Kathleen Lloyd as Laura O'Keefe
- Denny Miller as Tanner
- John Randolph as Stevenson
- David Faustino as Patrick
- Robert Webber as Woodrow Norton
- Efrem Zimbalist Jr. as Robert Cluso
