= Outlet store =

Store where a manufacturer directly sells to the consumer

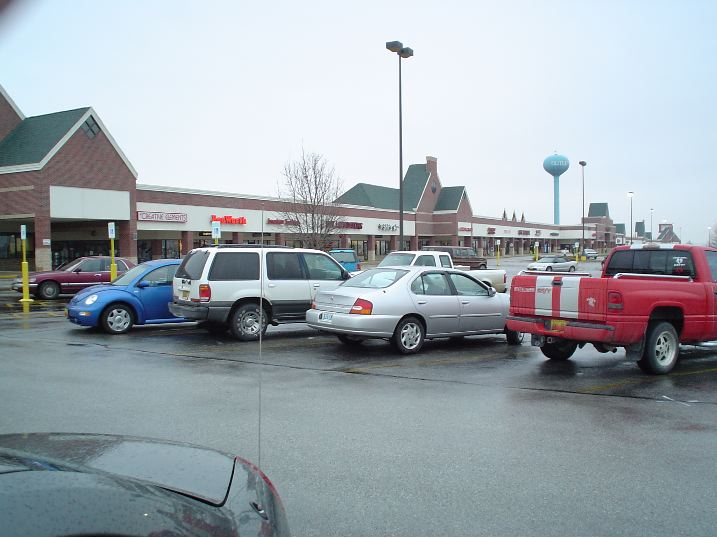
The Nebraska Crossing Outlets Mall (Gretna, Nebraska, 2004)

An outlet store, factory outlet or factory store is a brick and mortar or online store where manufacturers sell their merchandise directly to the public. Products at outlet stores are usually sold at reduced prices compared to regular stores because they are overstock, closeouts, returns, factory seconds, or lower-quality versions manufactured specifically for outlets. Traditionally, a factory outlet was a store attached to a factory or warehouse, sometimes allowing customers to watch the production process, as in the original L.L. Bean store. In modern usage, outlet stores are typically manufacturer-branded stores such as Gap or Bon Worth grouped together in outlet malls. The invention of the factory outlet store is often credited to Harold Alfond, founder of the Dexter Shoe Company.

== History ==
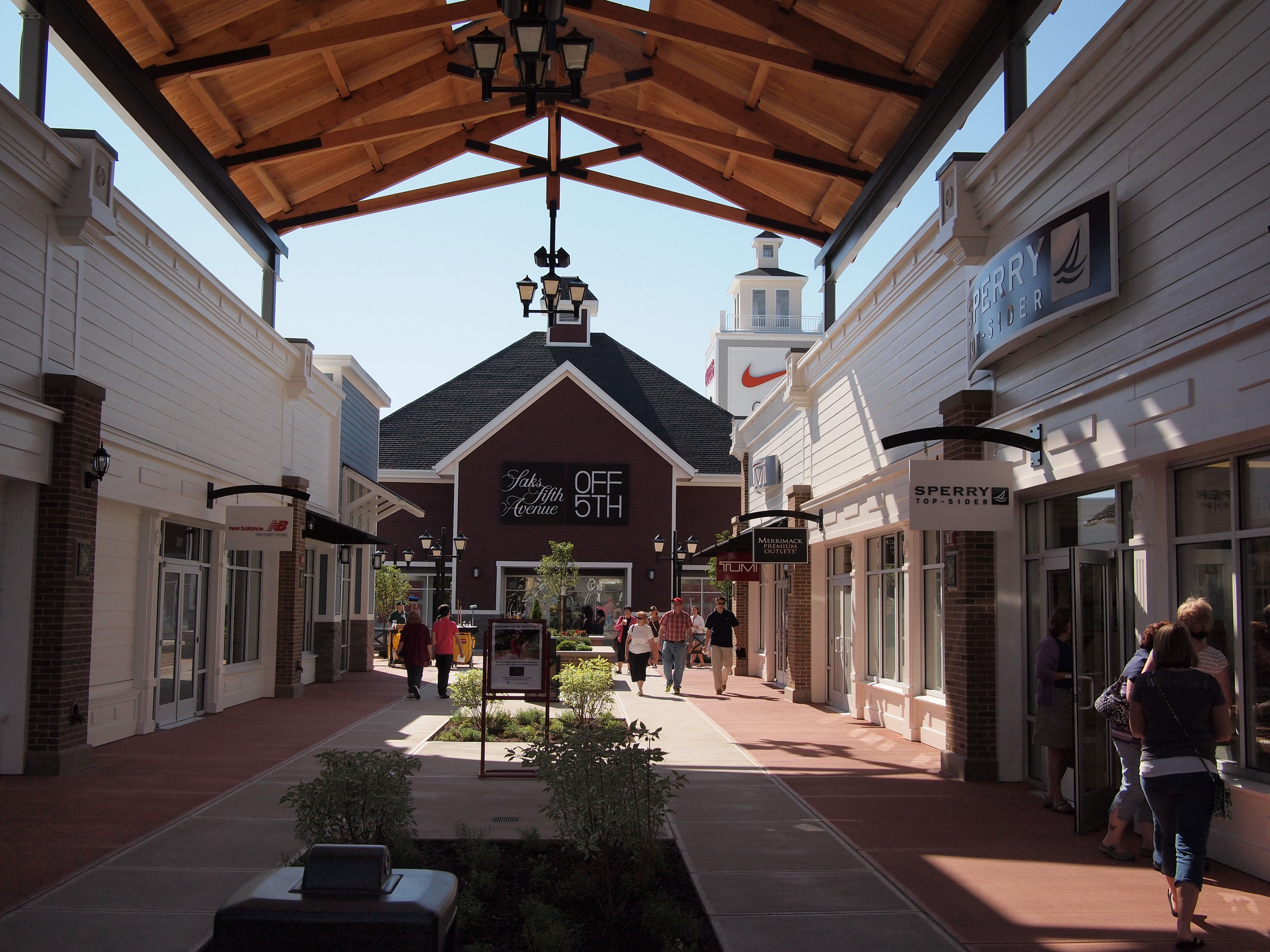
Merrimack Premium Outlets in New Hampshire in 2012

Outlets first surfaced in the eastern United States in the 1930s. Factory stores started to offer damaged or excess goods to employees at a low price. After some time, the audience expanded to include non-employees. In 1936, Anderson-Little (a men's clothing brand) opened an outlet store independent of its existing factories. Until the 1970s, the primary purpose of outlet stores was to dispose of excess or damaged goods.

In 1970, Vanity Fair opened the first multi-store factory outlet center in Reading, Pennsylvania. Outlet stores enabled manufacturers to directly enter the retail field themselves and capture more of the profit associated with their brand names. Very few outlet centers were built within major cities, in order to minimize disruption to manufacturers' existing relationships with department stores and other chain stores which had traditionally sold their merchandise. To avoid "retaliation" against manufacturers from such retailers, outlet centers were often positioned at least 20 to 30 miles from the nearest department store, along major highways between metropolitan areas or in resort or recreational areas.

Throughout the 1980s and 1990s, outlet centers grew rapidly in the United States. A typical outlet center in the United States is opened with between 100,000 and 200,000 square feet (about 1 to 2 hectares) of retail space. This can gradually increase to 500,000 to 600,000 feet (around 5 hectares). The average outlet center has an area of 216,000 square feet. In 2003, outlet malls in the United States generated $15 billion in revenue from 260 stores.

The number of American outlet centers increased from 113 in 1988 to 276 in 1991 and to 325 in 1997.

Outlet malls are not an exclusively American phenomenon. In Canada, the Dixie Outlet Mall dates from the late 1980s and was followed by Vaughan Mills in 1999, and Toronto Premium Outlets in 2013. In Europe, retailer BAA McArthurGlen has opened 13 malls with over 1,200 stores and 3 million square feet (about 30 hectares) of retail space; describing itself as an "outlet village", Bicester Village, on the edge of the town of Bicester in Oxfordshire in England, is a regular stop for bus-tours of foreign tourists, especially from China. Stores have also been emerging in Japan since the mid to late 1990s.

== Difference between outlet and regular stores ==
A majority of the products sold by clothing and accessory manufacturers at outlet stores are specifically manufactured for outlets using lower-quality materials and manufacturing processes than their higher-priced products sold in regular stores. Tags may list a "Compare At" or "Comparable Value" price which indicates the outlet retailer's estimated full price of similar products at regular stores, but in many cases the specific product has never been available at that higher price point.

As of 2026, many brands operated more off-price stores than regular-price ones - for example, 96 Ann Taylor regular stores and 122 Ann Taylor Factory stores in the U.S., and 93 Nordstrom regular department stores and 269 Nordstrom Racks.

Outlet stores often have more stringent return policies than regular stores, and manufacturers will typically not allow returns or exchanges for products purchased at outlets stores at their regular stores.

== Outlet malls ==
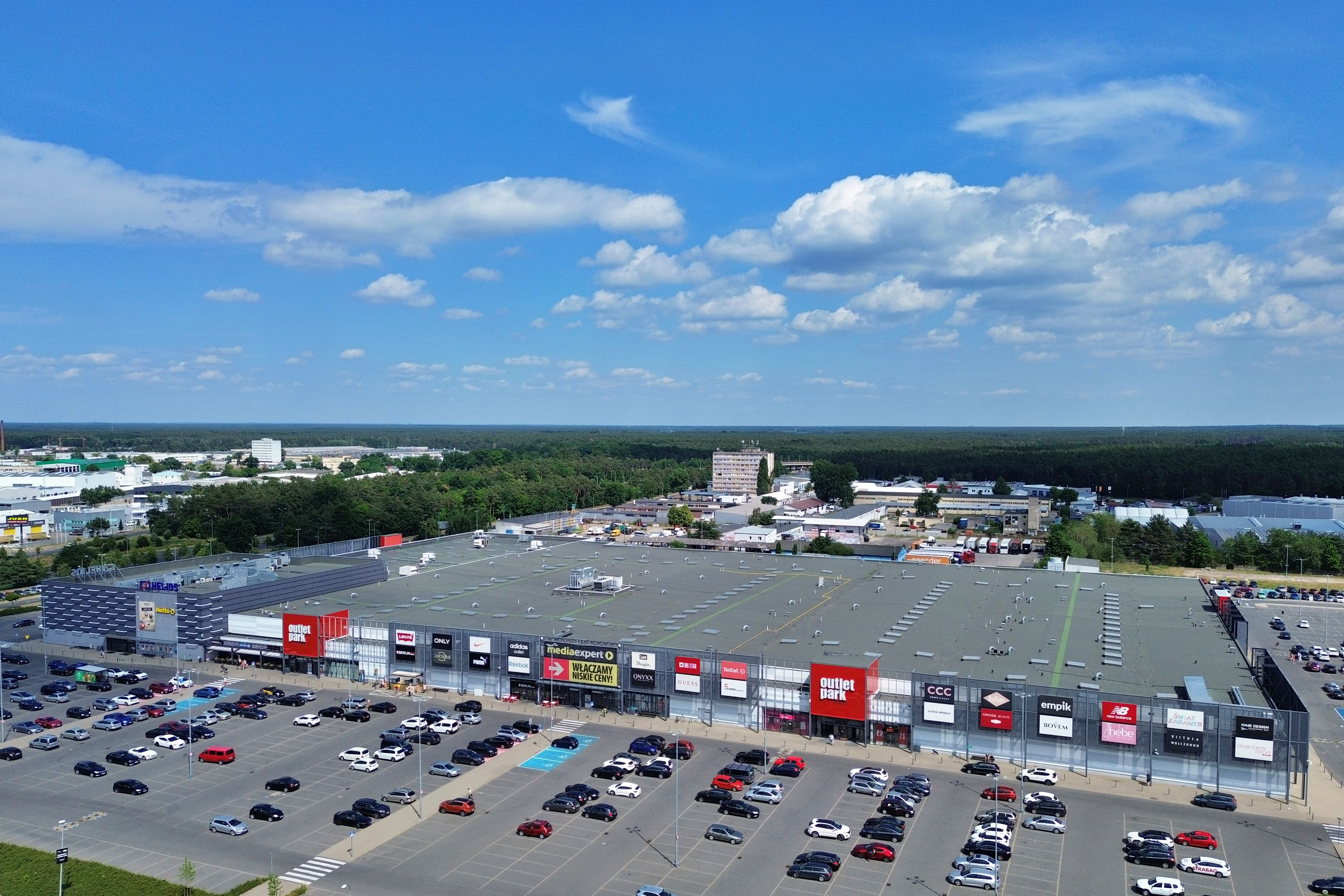
Outlet Park Szczecin, one of the largest outlet malls in Poland.

An outlet mall is a shopping mall composed primarily of outlet stores as anchors and other smaller stores. Examples in the United States include series of malls such as Fashion Outlet owned by Macerich, and Premium Outlets owned by Simon Property Group.
