= Osiedle Majowe =

Neighbourhood of Szczecin, Poland

- Administrative neighbourhood
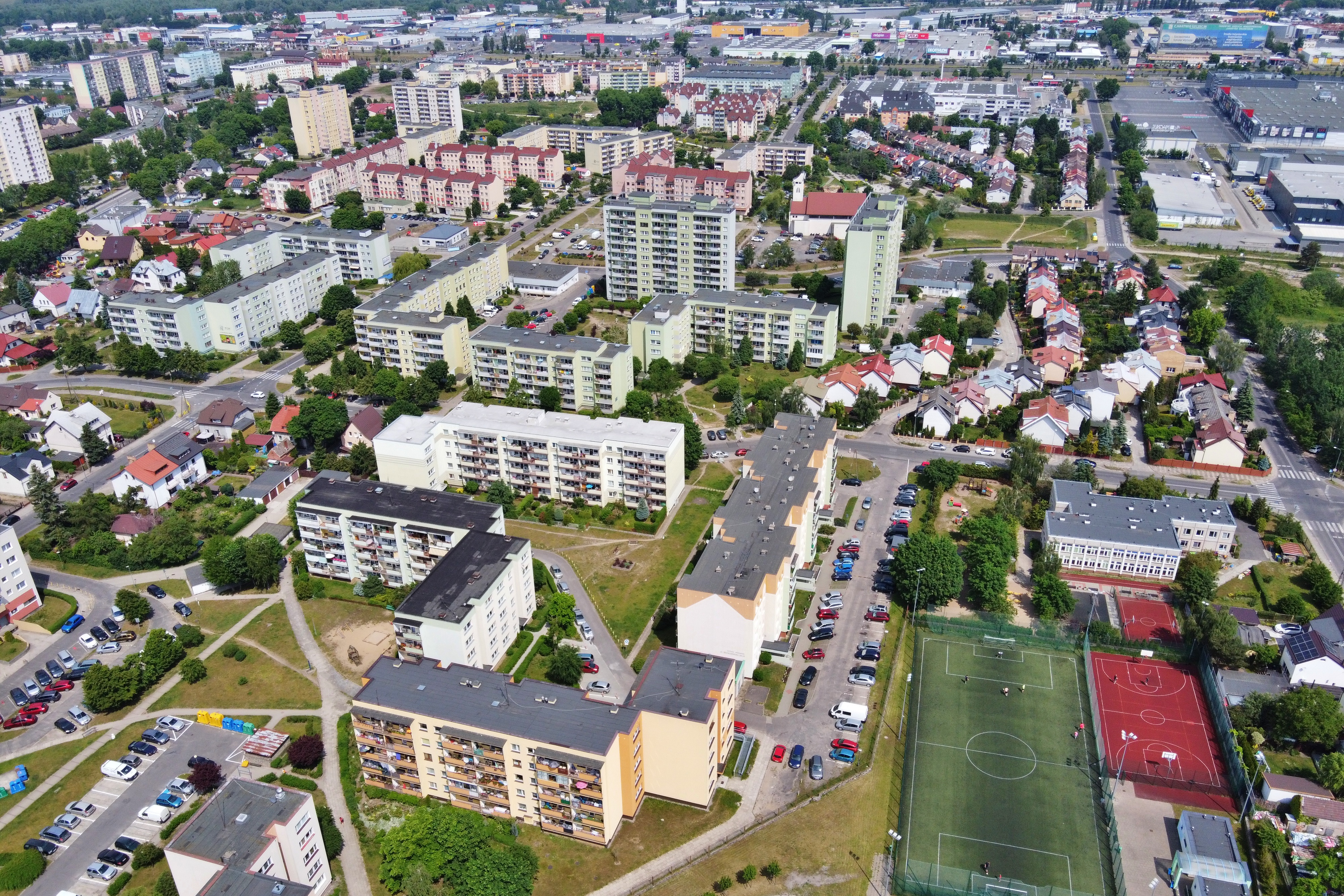
- The residential buildings in Osiedle Majowe, at the intersection of Maciejowa and Iwaszkiewicza Streets.

- Location within Szczecin.
- Coordinates: 53°22′36″N 14°39′56″E
- Country: Poland
- Voivodeship: West Pomeranian
- City and county: Szczecin
- District: Right Bank

Area
  - Total: 1.9 km^{2} (0.73 sq mi)

Population (2025)
  - Total: 6,562
  - Density: 3,500/km^{2} (8,900/sq mi)
- Time zone: UTC+1 (CET)
  - Summer (DST): UTC+2 (CEST)
- Area code: +48 91
- Car plates: ZS

Osiedle Majowe (Polish: [ɔˈɕɛ.dlɛ maˈjɔ.vɛ]; lit. 'May Estate') is an administrative neighbourhood forming a subdivision of the West district in the city of Szczecin, Poland. It it dominated by a housing estate with high-rise apartment buildings, and also includes the low-rise single-family housing. It has an area of 1.9 km^{2} (0.73 sq mi), and in 2025, it had the population of 6,562 people. Its south-west portion forms the neighbourhood of Krzekoszów.

Prior to the Second World War, the area included the hamlet of Krzekoszów, which was incorporated into the city in 1939. It again became a separate settlement in 1945 and was reincorporated in 1948. The housing estate of Osiedle Majowe begun being developed in 1974, and continued throughout the 1980s.

== Toponomy ==
The name Osiedle Majowe translates from Polish to mean the May Estate or the May Neighbourhood. It was named after the month of May from the Julian and Gregorian calendars. The neighbourhood is sometimes simply referred to as Majowe.

== History ==
The neighbourhood of Krzekoszów (German: Wilhelmsmühle bei Altdamm) was present in the area prior to the Second World War. It originally developed as a small farming hamlet with a gristmill, named Wilhelm Mill (Wilhelmsmühle). The settlement, together with its farmlands, was located in the area between the current Strugi Street to the north, Niedźwiedzia Street, Zoologiczna Street, and Dąbska Street to the east, the railway tracks to the south, and Botaniczna Street to the west. Krzekoszów was incorporated into the city of Szczecin on 15 October 1939. On 26 April 1945, during the Second World War, it was captured by the Red Army of the Soviet Union. Afterwards, it city core was placed under the Polish administration on 5 July 1945, while its suburbs were placed under Soviet military occupation, becoming separate settlements. They were relinquished to the Polish control on 5 July 1945, and the area of Krzekoszów was reincorporated into the city on 1 May 1948.

In 1974, the housing estate, named Osiedle Majowe (lit. 'May Estate'), begun being developed in the area between Gombrowicza Street to the north, Botaniczna Street to the east, Nałkowskiej Street to the south, and Łubinowa Street to the west. It was designed by Witold Gombrowicz. The neighbourhood was dominated by 5- and 12-storey apartment buildings. Its initial construction was finished in the 1980s. The housing estate also incorporated the single-family detached and semi-detached homes of Krzekoszów, located in the areas Łubinowej, Zaranie, and Botaniczna Streets, with the developments dating to before the Second World War. Several 4- and 11-storey apartment buildings were built between the low-rise buildings. Numerous commercial and service outlets were built in the areas of Kosynierów and Iwaszkiewicza Street. It included a market place stretching between Iwaszkiewicza and Zaranie Street, now informally known as the Literature Square. In the 1990s, the neighbourhood was expanded with the construction of the apartment buidlings to the north of Gombrowicza Street, reaching to Struga Street. Several large commercial buildings were developed in the area of Struga Street, including the Słoneczne shopping mall, opened in 1997 at 18 Struga Street. Additionally, in 2012, the outlet mall named Outlet Park Szczecin was opened at 42 Struga Street. It was later expanded in 2015, and 2017, currently having an area of 31,000 m^{2}.

Between 1999 and 2007, the Church of the Divine Providence, a Roman Catholic parish church was built at 19 Dąbrowskiej Street.

On 28 November 1990, the neighbourhood of Majowe-Kijewo was established, as one of the administrative subdivisions of the West district, being governed by an elected neighbourhood council. It consisted of the housing estates of Kijewo and Osiedle Majowe. On 10 March 2003, they were separated into two administrative units. In 2005, the border between Osiedle Majowe and Dąbie was modified.

== Characteristics ==
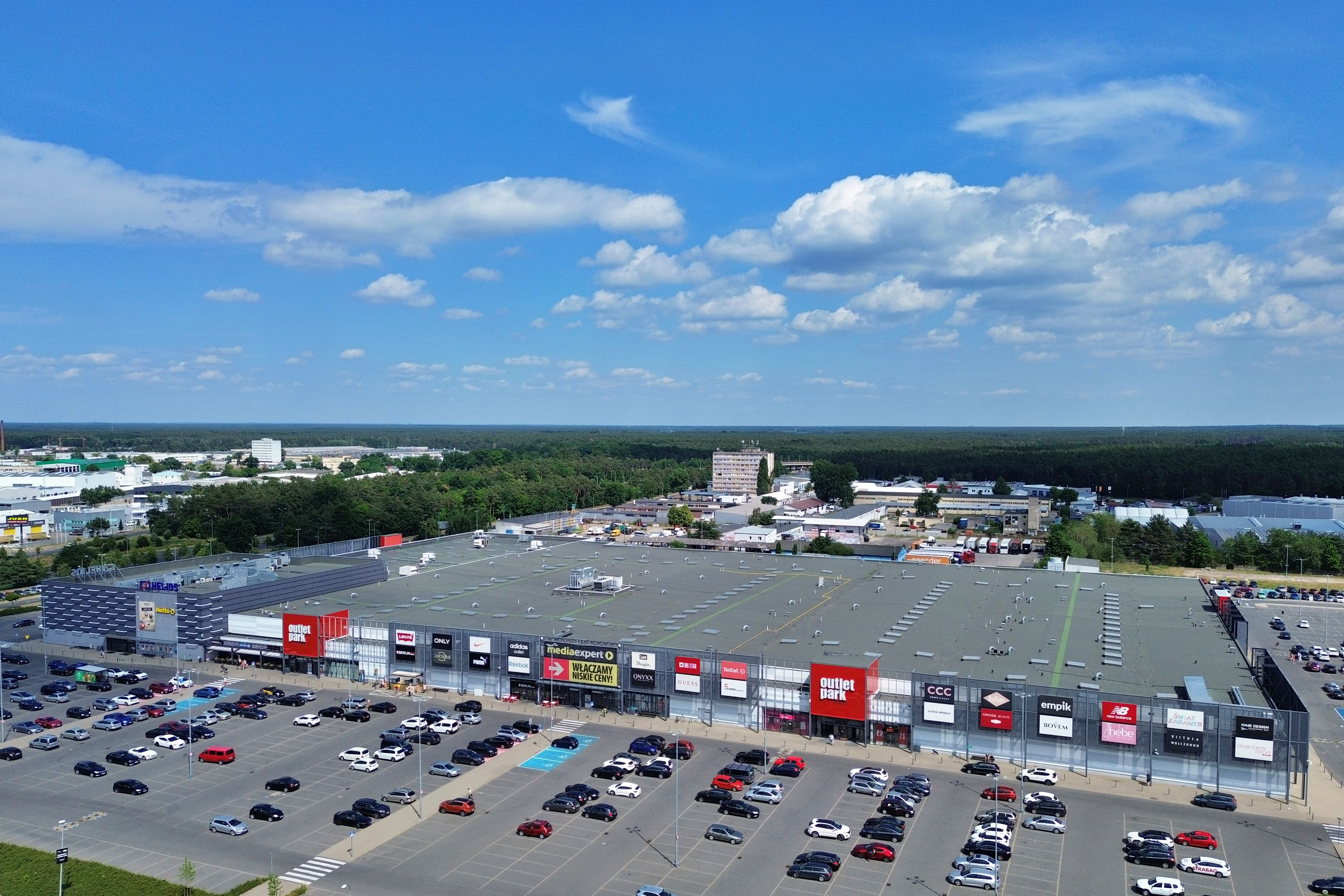
The Outlet Park Szczecin shopping mall.

Osiedle Majowe is a residential area, dominated by the apartment buildings, located between Struga Street to the north, Botaniczna Street to the east, Nałkowskiej Street to the sout, and Łubinowa Street to the west. It also includes single-family detached and semi-detaches homes in the areas of Łubinowa, Zaranie, and Botaniczna Streets. The area to the south of Dąbrowskiej Street, is also sometimes called Krzekoszów, after the historic village, previously located in the nieighbourhood. In the north, in the area of Struga Street, the neighbourhood also includes numerous commercial buildings. It includes the shopping malls of Słoneczne, and Outlet Park Szczecin, located at 18 and 42 Struga Street, respectively. The later is an outlet mall, with an area of 31,000 m^{2}. Osiedle Majowe also includes the Church of the Divine Providence, a Roman Catholic parish church at 19 Dąbrowskiej Street. In the east, the neighbourhood also has a portion of the Dąbie Forest Park.

== Demographics ==
Historical population
| Year | 2005 | 2008 | 2009 | 2010 | 2011 | 2012 | 2013 | 2014 | 2015 | 2016 | 2017 | 2018 | 2019 | 2020 | 2021 | 2025 |
| Pop. | 8,139 | 8,023 | 7,935 | 7,732 | 7,607 | 7,669 | 7,587 | 7,411 | 7,368 | 7,339 | 7,273 | 7,143 | 7,086 | 7,031 | 6,966 | 6,562 |
| ±% | — | −1.4% | −1.1% | −2.6% | −1.6% | +0.8% | −1.1% | −2.3% | −0.6% | −0.4% | −0.9% | −1.8% | −0.8% | −0.8% | −0.9% | −5.8% |

== Government and boundaries ==
Osiedle Majowe is one of the administrative neighbourhoods forming a subdivision of the Right Bank district in the city of Szczecin, Poland. It is governed by a locally elected neighbourhood council with 15 members. Its headquarters are located at 33 Nałkowskiej Street. Its boundaries are approximately determined by Struga Street, Tarpanowa Street, Dąbska Street, Łubianowa Street, and the boundary with the neighbourhood of Bukowe-Klęskowo. Osiedle Majowe borders the neighbourhoods of Bukowe-Klęskowo, Dąbie, Kijewo, and Osiedle Słoneczne. It has the total area of 1.9 km^{2} (0.73 sq mi).
