= Kopplin =

Kopplin is a surname. Notable people with the surname include:

- Björn Kopplin (born 1989), German football player
- Gail Kopplin (1939–2021), American politician and school administrator from Nebraska
- Zack Kopplin (born 1993), American political activist, journalist, and television personality
