= Senator Beyer =

Senator Beyer may refer to:

- Emil Beyer (1929–2014), Nebraska State Senate
- Lee Beyer (born 1948), Oregon State Senate
- Roger Beyer (born 1960), Oregon State Senate
- Rudolph Beyer (1889–1970), Wisconsin State Senate
