= Senator Garrett =

Senator Garrett may refer to:

- Avery Garrett (1916–1988), Washington State Senate
- Billy Garrett (politician) (born 1956), North Carolina State Senate
- Daniel E. Garrett (1869–1932), Texas State Senate
- Helen Garrett (1929–2006), Kentucky State Senate
- Julian Garrett (1940–2026), Iowa State Senate
- Michael Garrett (politician) (born 1980s), North Carolina State Senate
- Susan Garrett (born 1950), Illinois State Senate
- Tom Garrett (Virginia politician) (born 1972), Virginia State Senate
- Tommy Garrett (Nebraska politician) (born 1954), Nebraska State Senate
- William A. Garrett (1854–1951), Virginia State Senate
