= Carol Blood =

American politician (born 1961)

Member of the Nebraska Legislature from the 3rd district
- In office January 4, 2017 – January 8, 2025
- Preceded by: Tommy Garrett
- Succeeded by: Victor Rountree

Personal details
- Born: Carol Vacek; March 5, 1961 (age 65) Bellevue, Nebraska, U.S.
- Party: Democratic
- Spouse: Joe Blood (m. 1987)
- Children: 3
- Education: Metropolitan Community College (attended)
- Website: Campaign website

Carol Blood (née Vacek; born March 5, 1961) is an American politician from the U.S. state of Nebraska. In 2016, she was elected to represent District 3 in Sarpy County in the Nebraska Legislature with 51.56% of the vote. In 2020 she was re-elected with 50.4% of the vote. She was the Democratic nominee in the 2022 Nebraska gubernatorial election. Blood is a member of the Democratic Party, though elections to the Nebraska Legislature are officially nonpartisan.

== Early life and career ==
Blood was born in McCook, Nebraska. She graduated in 1979 from Adams Central High School in nearby Hastings, Nebraska. In 2008, Blood was elected to the Bellevue, Nebraska, City Council as the at-large representative. She was re-elected to the city council in 2012. She previously served as executive director of the La Vista Chamber of Commerce. Blood has been a member of the Bellevue Public Safety Foundation Board since 2005, serving as chair for seven years. The organization supports police and fire department activities in Bellevue.

== Nebraska Legislature ==
=== Elections ===
==== 2014 ====
In 2014, Blood was defeated by Tommy Garrett in a race to fill the two years remaining of a four-year legislative term vacated by state senator Scott Price, who resigned in November 2013. Garrett was appointed to the seat by Governor Dave Heineman. In Nebraska, an appointed state legislator must run in the next election to keep their seat.

Blood and Garrett, who both ran uncontested in the nonpartisan primary, moved onto the general election. In the primary election, Blood received 1,706 votes, or 49.4%, of the 3,453 votes cast. Garrett received 1,747, or 50.6%. In the general election, Blood lost the election with 4,179, or 46.3%, of 9,024 votes cast. Garrett won the election with 4,845 votes, or 53.7%.

==== 2016 ====
In 2016, Blood defeated Republican incumbent Tommy Garrett with 7,959, or 51.4%, of the 15,488 votes cast. Garrett received 7,476 votes, or 48.3%. Blood's campaign focused on "common sense tax relief" and eliminating taxes on social security and military retirement once Nebraska lawmakers address a $1 billion budget shortfall.

Blood said her history of "evidence-based budgeting" would help with tax reform. She also said education and public safety were among her top priorities.

==== 2020 ====
On May 12, 2020, Blood defeated Rick Holdcroft with 50.4% of the vote for the general election held November 3, 2020.

=== Legislative tenure ===
==== 2017 session ====
Blood served on the Agriculture, General Affairs, and Government, Military, and Veterans Affairs committees.

She introduced LB85, which called to make people ineligible to run for elected office if they held any outstanding penalties from the Nebraska Accountability and Disclosure Commission. The bill, which passed on a vote of 48-0-1, also prohibits anyone from being appointed to an elective office until any civil penalties and interest are paid.

Blood said LB88 was a priority to make Nebraska a more “military-friendly state,” which directly affects her district—home those who are employed at Offutt Air Force Base. Ultimately, LB88, or the Interstate Medical Licensure Compact and the Nurse Licensure Compact, passed on a vote of 49-0-0.

==== 2018 session ====
During the 2018 session, Blood met directly with the Nebraska Supreme Court and negotiated reduced fees for military spouses seeking to join the Nebraska State Bar Association.

Blood introduced legislation to increase the handgun permit fee from $5 to $25, failed to pass on a 16–26 vote. In Nebraska, the gun permit fee has remained $5 since it was introduced in 1991. Blood said the proposed increased cost would have helped mitigate increased labor costs to process the permits. Blood said that the number of gun permit applications in Nebraska have quadrupled in the last decade.

Blood's LB692, which called to require the state department of corrections to conduct a regular staffing analysis report, became a part of the Judiciary Committee's LB841, which passed on a 42-1-6 vote.

==== 2019 session ====
From 2019 to 2020, Blood served on the agriculture committee, general affairs committee, and the government, military and veterans affairs committee.

==== 2021 session ====
From 2021 to 2022 Blood served on the business and labor, government, military and veterans affairs, and urban affairs committee.

Blood was appointed to the decennial Redistricting Committee, which utilizes census data to draw all political district maps.

==== 2023 session ====
Blood currently serves on the business and labor, urban affairs, and judiciary committees.

Blood has introduced legislation to ratify the "Child Labor Amendment", which is a federal constitutional amendment that gives Congress the power to regulate child labor. The amendment was successfully proposed by Congress in 1924 and ratified by 28 states over the course of 12 years. However, the amendment died out, and has not been ratified by the 38 states needed - but the amendment had no time limit, so it is still on the books as a proposed amendment. Nebraska never ratified the amendment, nor did it ever reject it.

== 2022 gubernatorial race ==
On August 2, 2021, the Lincoln Journal Star reported that she was considering running in the 2022 Nebraska gubernatorial election. On September 13, 2021, she formally announced her candidacy for the Democratic nomination for Governor of Nebraska in the 2022 Nebraska gubernatorial election.

In the May 10 primary, she defeated Roy Harris and became the Democratic nominee. On November 8, 2022, she lost to Republican gubernatorial nominee Jim Pillen, 59% to 36%. Her running-mate and nominee for lieutenant governor was former state senator and Nebraskan rancher Al Davis.

== Personal life ==
Blood lives in Bellevue with her husband, Joe. They have three children and twelve grandchildren.

Party political offices
Preceded by Bob Krist	Democratic nominee for Governor of Nebraska; 2022	Succeeded by Lynne Walz
