= The Missouri Breaks =

1976 film by Arthur Penn

- Theatrical release poster by Bob Peak
- Directed by: Arthur Penn
- Written by: Thomas McGuane
- Produced by: Elliott Kastner; Robert M. Sherman
- Starring: Marlon Brando; Jack Nicholson; Randy Quaid; Kathleen Lloyd; Frederic Forrest; Harry Dean Stanton
- Cinematography: Michael Butler
- Edited by: Dede Allen; Gerald B. Greenberg; Steven A. Rotter; Cynthia Scheider
- Music by: John Williams
- Distributed by: United Artists
- Release date: May 19, 1976
- Running time: 126 minutes
- Country: United States
- Language: English
- Budget: $10 million
- Box office: $14 million

The Missouri Breaks is a 1976 American Western film starring Marlon Brando and Jack Nicholson. The film was directed by Arthur Penn, with supporting performances by Randy Quaid, Harry Dean Stanton, Frederic Forrest, John McLiam, and Kathleen Lloyd in her film debut. The score was composed by John Williams.

The title of the film refers to a forlorn and very rugged area of north-central Montana, where over eons, the Missouri River has made countless deep cuts or "breaks" in the land.

The film explores themes including the American frontier myth, economic exploitation and law and order. Like some other films directed by Penn, it has been read as an allegory of capitalism and the American counterculture.

== Plot ==
Tom Logan is a rustler experiencing hard times. His gang and he are particularly upset by the hanging of a friend of theirs by David Braxton, a land baron, who takes the law into his own hands. They decide to seek vengeance against Braxton by killing his foreman Pete Marker, hanging him from the same tree used by Braxton and his men to hang their friend. Logan and his gang then buy a small farm close to Braxton's ranch with money they stole during a train robbery, and begin rustling his stock.

First the gang, without Logan, rides across the Missouri River and north of the border into Canada to steal horses belonging to the North-West Mounted Police. The theft initially goes well, until the Mounted Police catch up to the gang, forcing them to abandon the stolen horses and flee for their lives. In their absence, Logan plants crops and enters into a relationship with Braxton's aggressive, virginal daughter, Jane.

Braxton is incensed with both his rustling problem and his daughter, and sends for Robert E. Lee Clayton, a notorious Irish-American "regulator", who for a price, will take care of the rustlers.

Quickly suspicious of Logan, who does not strike him as a farmer, Clayton dons a variety of disguises and begins to pick off Logan's gang, one by one. Identifying himself under the pseudonym of "Jim Ferguson", he kills Logan's young friend Little Tod, who cannot swim, by drowning him in the Missouri River.

Clayton spies on Logan with binoculars and taunts Braxton about his daughter's affair with a horse thief. Braxton attempts to discharge him, but Clayton is determined to finish his job. He shoots Logan gang member Si as he is trying to have sex with a farmer's adulterous wife. He also shoots Cary after he enters an outhouse. Finally, Clayton arrives at the gang's hideout one night and sets fire to the house, forcing a burning Cal to run to the river and throw himself in to extinguish the flames. He asks Cal where Logan is, and Cal says he was in the house but refused to come out. Clayton then impales Cal through his right eye with a large throwing star. Logan arrives the next morning, and sadly buries Cal.

A few nights later, Clayton is serenading his horse by campfire light. Once the campfire goes dark and Clayton falls asleep, Logan sneaks into his camp and slits his throat. Logan then comes after Braxton, who has been feigning a trance due to shock. At an opportune moment, Braxton pulls a gun on Logan and attempts to kill him. Logan gets the upper hand and shoots Braxton in the chest, killing him.

Logan abandons his farm and packs up to leave, planning to go north of the Missouri River. Jane arrives, telling him that she has found a buyer for the ranch, and asks about the two of them. He acknowledges to Jane the possibility that they can renew their relationship at another time and place, maybe six months in the future.

== Cast ==
- Marlon Brando as Lee Clayton
- Jack Nicholson as Tom Logan
- Randy Quaid as Little Tod
- Frederic Forrest as Cary
- Harry Dean Stanton as Calvin
- John McLiam as David Braxton
- John Ryan as Si
- Sam Gilman as Hank Rate
- Kathleen Lloyd as Jane Braxton

== Production ==
Brando agreed to accept $1 million for five weeks' work plus 11.3% of gross receipts in excess of $10 million. Nicholson agreed to accept $1.25 million for 10 weeks work, plus 10% of the gross receipts in excess of $12.5 million. (Nicholson later sued producer Elliott Kastner for unpaid wages.)

In a May 24, 1976 Time interview, Brando revealed he "changed the entire flavor of his character—an Irish-American bounty hunter called 'Robert E. Lee Clayton'—by inventing a deadly hand weapon resembling both a harpoon and a mace that he uses to kill." Brando said "I always wondered why in the history of lethal weapons no one invented that particular one. It appealed to me because I used to be very expert at knife throwing." Brando broke the monotony of the production by playing childish pranks with rubber spiders and eggs as well as frequently mooning the cast and crew. He would interrupt shots with bizarre behavior like biting a chunk out of a frog during a river scene and taking potshots at grasshoppers instead of his firing a gun at co-star Nicholson as scripted. Director Penn apparently made no effort to control him.

In August, while filming a scene on the Yellowstone River that required the two main characters on horses to cross the river, one of the horses, named Jug, died in the river. The American Humane Association (AHA) investigated. When questioned, the film's production executive, Jack Grossberg, said Jug hit a car body with one hoof, had a heart attack, and then died of shock. The sheriff came to the conclusion that it was an accident. According to a spokesman for the Billings Humane Society, the sheriff's investigation was unsatisfactory. Both the National and Billings Humane Societies alleged that Jug drowned after being bound, strapped, and dragged through the water. Representatives from both the local and national AHA requested access to the set, but were told by the producers the set was closed to visitors, without exception. Harold Melniker of the Hollywood chapter of the AHA stated that the accident would not have occurred if the river bottom had first been checked. After the horse's drowning and the injury of several others, including one by AHA-prohibited tripwire, the film was placed on the AHA's "unacceptable" list.

== Reception ==
=== Box office ===
Missouri Breaks grossed $14 million domestically (United States and Canada), against a production budget of $10 million.

=== Critical response ===
Coming on the heels of Brando and Nicholson's Oscar-winning turns in The Godfather and One Flew Over the Cuckoo's Nest respectively, the film was highly anticipated, but became a notorious critical and commercial flop. At the time, Vincent Canby's review in The New York Times cited "an out-of-control performance" by Brando.

Since its release, the reception of the film has improved. In 2003, Xan Brooks of The Guardian wrote: "On first release, Arthur Penn's 1976 Western found itself derided as an addled, self-indulgent folly. Today, its quieter passages resonate more satisfyingly, while its lunatic take on a decadent, dying frontier seems oddly appropriate...". On the review aggregator website Rotten Tomatoes, 78% of 27 critics' reviews are positive, with an average rating of 6.5/10. Metacritic, which uses a weighted average, assigned the film a score of 65 out of 100, based on 11 critics, indicating "generally favorable" reviews.

== In other media ==
In M. Night Shyamalan's 2021 film Old, Rufus Sewell's character repeatedly asks the other characters if they remember the title of a film that starred Marlon Brando and Jack Nicholson. The character in the film, a surgeon named Charles, has schizophrenia, then develops dementia as he ages. Shyamalan explained that the character's question was based on a conversation he had with his father, Dr. Nelliyattu C. Shyamalan, who also has dementia: "I've never seen [The Missouri Breaks]...It's from my dad, who actually has some dementia, and he would not stop talking about Jack Nicholson and Marlon Brando, this movie that they were in. And I was like 'Dad, I have never seen it.' And he goes, 'Jack Nicholson! Marlon Brando!' And he kept going on and on about it. I was like 'Dad, I'm putting this in a movie if you keep talking about this.' And he did."
