= Orval Keyes =

American politician (1913–1991)

Member of the Nebraska Legislature from the 3rd district
- In office January 6, 1969 – January 7, 1981
- Preceded by: Dale Payne
- Succeeded by: Emil Beyer

Personal details
- Born: October 31, 1913
- Died: April 29, 1991 (aged 77) Gretna, Nebraska
- Party: Republican (until 1973); Democratic (1973–1991)
- Spouse: Lois Gottsch (m. 1939)
- Children: 9
- Occupation: Farmer, cattle feeder

Orval Keyes (October 31, 1913 – April 29, 1991) was an American politician from Nebraska who served as a member of the Nebraska Legislature from the 3rd district from 1969 to 1981. He was initially a Republican but switched to the Democratic Party in 1973.

== Early career ==
Keyes was born in 1913, and graduated from Springfield High School in Springfield, Nebraska. Keyes was a farmer and served as the director of several local school districts.

== Nebraska Legislature ==
In 1968, Keyes challenged State Senator Dale Payne for re-election in the 3rd district. Reed placed first in the primary, winning 41 percent of the vote to Payne's 34 percent and Keyes's 25 percent. However, on July 24, 1968, Payne withdrew from his re-election campaign, and Keyes gathered signatures to appear on the general election ballot. Reed was seen as the frontrunner going into the election, but Keyes defeated him in a "mild upset," receiving 54 percent of the vote to Reed's 46 percent.

Keyes ran for re-election in 1972. Following redistricting, the district, which previously included all of Sarpy County, was redrawn to only include western Sarpy County. He was challenged by four opponents: Sarpy County Planning Commissioner Lewis Bottorff, Bellevue College student John Eating, real estate salesman Fred Krambeck, and former Papillion City Councilman Raymond Lemke. In the primary election, Keyes narrowly placed first, winning 32 percent of the vote to Lemke's 28 percent. In the general election, Keyes defeated Lemke, winning his second term, 54–46 percent.

In 1973, Keyes switched parties, citing the state party's support for Lemke in his re-election campaign, which he said "made my stay unwelcome." In doing so, Keyes suggested that he might challenge Republican Congressman John McCollister for re-election, noting that McCollister "had better be prepared." However, Keyes ultimately declined to run, and endorsed Dan Lynch's campaign.

Keyes ran for re-election to a third term in 1976. He was challenged by Gretna School Board member Keith Barkley. Keyes placed first in the primary over Barkley by a wide margin, winning 59 percent of the vote to Barkley's 41 percent. In the general election, Keyes defeated Barkley, 57–43 percent.

In 1980, Keyes ran for re-election to a fourth term. He was challenged by Emil Beyer, a real estate investor and former member of the Papillion School Board. Keyes placed first in the primary election, receiving 54 percent of the vote to Beyer's 46 percent, and they advanced to the general election. Beyer ultimately defeated Keyes, winning 55 percent of the vote to Keyes's 45 percent.

== 1982 campaign for State Tresurer ==
In 1982, Keyes announced that he would run for State Treasurer. He won the Democratic nomination unopposed, and faced appointed State Treasurer Kay Orr, the Republican nominee, in the general election. Orr defeated Keyes in a landslide, winning 63 percent of the vote to Keyes's 37 percent.

== Death ==
Keyes died on April 29, 1991.
