= Ray Mossey =

American politician

Member of the Nebraska Legislature from the 3rd district
- In office November 15, 2002 – January 5, 2005
- Preceded by: Jon Bruning
- Succeeded by: Gail Kopplin

Personal details
- Born: June 16, 1967 (age 59) Bellevue, Nebraska
- Party: Republican
- Occupation: Police officer

Military service
- Allegiance: United States
- Branch/service: United States Air Force
- Years of service: 1986–1990
- Awards: Air Force Achievement Medal; Air Force Good Conduct Medal; Air Force Commendation Medal

Ray Mossey (born June 16, 1967) is a Republican politician who served as a member of the Nebraska Legislature from 2002 to 2005.

== Early life ==
Mossey was born in Bellevue, Nebraska, and grew up in Manitou Springs, Colorado, graduating from Manitou Springs High School. He served in the United States Air Force Security Police from 1986 1990. Mossey was stationed at RAF Mildenhall in the United Kingdom and Davis–Monthan Air Force Base in Tucson, Arizona. After retiring from the Air Force, he returned to Nebraska, and served as a Sarpy County deputy sheriff from 1990 to 1992, and then as an officer in the Omaha Police Department from 1992 to 2001. In 1998, Mossey was hit by a drunk driver and suffered a permanent back injury, and was awarded a service-connected disability in 2001.

== Nebraska Legislature ==
In 2002, State Senator Jon Bruning was elected Attorney General of Nebraska, and resigned from his seat in the Nebraska Legislature, which was based in Sarpy County, prior to a special legislative session to avoid a conflict of interest. Mossey applied to fill the vacancy, and was appointed by Governor Mike Johanns to serve out the remainder of Bruning's term, which expired in 2005.

Mossey ran for re-election in 2004. He was challenged by Gail Kopplin, the former superintendent of Gretna Public Schools, and Pam Duin, a registered nurse. Though the race was formally nonpartisan, Mossey was a Republican and Duin and Kopplin were Democrats. In the primary election, Mossey placed first with 42 percent of the vote, and advanced to the general election with Kopplin, who placed second with 36 percent. Following Mossey's arrest for prescription fraud, he ended his re-election campaign on October 15, 2004, but his name remained on the ballot. Kopplin ultimately won the election in a landslide, receiving 62 percent of the vote to Mossey's 38 percent.

== Legal troubles ==
On June 25, 2004, Mossey was arrested for committing prescription fraud and carrying a concealed weapon. Mossey entered into a pretrial diversion program, which required that he complete a pain management program and complete community service in exchange for the dismissal of the criminal charges.

After Mossey missed a filing deadline to report his campaign contributions and expenditures and the state Accountability and Disclosure Commission noticed discrepancies in his filings, they opened an audit of his campaign. Mossey ultimately dropped his re-election campaign, and failed to respond to the commission's request for additional records. The commission sent him a letter on November 30, 2002, requesting "clarification as to the campaign purpose" of over $7,000 in campaign expenditures, but Mossey failed to respond. Mossey was later fined $14,000 for using campaign funds for illegitimate purposes, including on the dating site eHarmony, an Omaha tattoo parlor, and medical expenses in Florida. Though Mossey entered into a payment agreement, on April 14, 2006, the commission sued him for failure to pay.

On February 7, 2005, Mossey got into a car accident and was cited for driving under the influence. Several days later, the county prosecutor's office concluded that, by consuming alcohol and failing to respond to the commission's questions regarding his campaign finances, Mossey violated the conditions of his diversion agreement, and resumed prosecution of his felony prescription fraud case. He was later charged with driving under the influence, and he pleaded not guilty. On June 24, 2005, the trial court judge excluded evidence from the blood test that was administered of Mossey, concluding that the test had been unlawfully conducted. On appeal, the judge's decision was reversed, and the blood test was admitted, Mossey ultimately pleaded guilty, and was sentenced to 12 months on probation. Mossey also pleaded no contest to his prescription fraud charge, and was sentenced to two years on probation.

Mossey moved to Galveston, Texas, to attend college, but after failing to attend a court hearing to demonstrate that he was abiding by the terms of his probation on November 21, 2006, he was sentenced to a ten-day jail term.
