= When the Legends Die =

1972 film by Stuart Millar

- Cover of the 1963 Lippincott first edition of When the Legends Die by Hal Borland
- Author: Hal Borland
- Cover artist: Paul Laune
- Language: English
- Genre: Young adult novel
- Publisher: Lippincott
- Publication date: 1963
- Publication place: United States
- Media type: Print (hardcover)
- Pages: 288

When the Legends Die
- Directed by: Stuart Millar
- Screenplay by: Robert Dozier
- Based on: When the Legends Die; 1963 novel by Hal Borland
- Produced by: Stuart Millar; Gene Lasko
- Starring: Richard Widmark; Frederic Forrest; Luana Anders
- Cinematography: Richard H. Kline
- Edited by: Louis San Andres
- Music by: Glenn Paxton
- Production company: Sagaponack Films
- Distributed by: Twentieth Century Fox Film Corporation
- Release date: October 19, 1972
- Running time: 107 minutes
- Country: United States
- Language: English

When The Legends Die is a 1963 American novel written by Hal Borland and a 1972 American Western film released in DeLuxe Color by Twentieth Century-Fox.

== Novel ==
The novel, about the life of a Ute Indian young man, was written in 1963 by Hal Borland. While it was written as a mainstream novel, it became a young adult classic. The novel is roughly divided into four parts: Tom Black Bull's youth with his parents who lived "off the reservation" in the wilderness of southern Colorado; Tom's experience as an orphan sent to the reservation school against his will; Tom's "abandonment" of the Indian lifestyle and his success on the rodeo circuit in Colorado, New Mexico, Texas and Oklahoma; and finally Tom's return to his roots — reconciling himself with his heritage and his solitary relationship with the land and the wilderness.

== Film ==
The film was made in 1972, starring Richard Widmark and Frederic Forrest. It was directed by Stuart Millar from a screenplay written by Robert Dozier. It was freely adapted from the novel, updating the action from the start of the 20th century to the present, and cutting out the majority of the original plot, effectively based on only one middle section of the novel.

The title is taken from the saying "When the legends die the dreams end, when the dreams end there is no more greatness."

The film had a budget of $1,520,000.

=== Plot ===
A Ute Indian youth, Tom Black Bull (Frederic Forrest), leaves the reservation to enter the rodeo life. He is under the tutelage of Red Dillon (Richard Widmark), a talented man with a drinking problem. The youth deals with the struggle between two worlds and deciding what life has to offer.

== Cast ==
- Richard Widmark as Red Dillon
- Frederic Forrest as Tom Black Bull
- Luana Anders as Mary
- Vito Scotti as Meo (Dillon's caretaker)
- Herbert Nelson as Dr. Wilson
- John War Eagle as Blue Elk
- John Gruber as Clyde "Tex" Walker
- Garry Walberg as School Superintendent
- Jack Mullaney as Gas Station Attendant
- Malcolm Curley as Benny Grayback (school principal)
- Roy Engel as Sam Turner
- Rex Holman as Neil Swenson
- Mel Gallagher as Cowboy
- Tillman Box as Young Tom Black Bull
- Sondra Pratt as Angie (girl who picks up Tom)

== Reception ==
The Denver premiere of When the Legends Die at the Esquire Theatre in August 1972 was the subject of a legal challenge. Four trustees of the Denver-based Golden Indian Bread Foundation, including Vernon Bellecourt, national director of the American Indian Movement, sued in Denver District Court to halt the screening, which had been advertised as a benefit for the foundation. Bellecourt called the film "another exploitation by 20th Century-Fox." The trustees argued that holding the benefit at the Esquire would create the public impression that the foundation endorsed the film. Judge James Flanigan denied the request for a temporary restraining order on August 25, 1972, and the premiere proceeded as scheduled.
