= It Lives Again =

1978 American film

- Theatrical release poster
- Directed by: Larry Cohen
- Written by: Larry Cohen
- Produced by: Larry Cohen
- Starring: Frederic Forrest; Kathleen Lloyd; John P. Ryan; John Marley; Andrew Duggan; Eddie Constantine
- Cinematography: Fenton Hamilton
- Edited by: Curtis Burch; Louis G. Friedman; Carol Oblath
- Music by: Themes: Bernard Herrmann; Orchestration and Conducting: Laurie Johnson
- Production company: Larco Productions
- Distributed by: Warner Bros. Pictures
- Release date: May 10, 1978
- Running time: 91 minutes
- Country: United States
- Language: English
- Box office: $1.5 million (US-Canada rentals)

It Lives Again (also known as It's Alive II) is a 1978 American science fiction horror film written, produced and directed by Larry Cohen. It is the sequel to the 1974 film It's Alive. The film stars Frederic Forrest, Kathleen Lloyd, John P. Ryan, John Marley, Andrew Duggan and Eddie Constantine. The film was released by Warner Bros. Pictures on May 10, 1978. This was followed by a 1987 sequel It's Alive III: Island of the Alive.

== Plot ==
Frank Davis, still reeling from the death of his child and the part he played in it, sees his chance to atone by assisting other would-be parents of mutant children. He tries to warn soon-to-be parents Jody and Eugene Scott of the conspiracy to murder their baby and the other unborn mutant children who are being born around the country. They are convinced when they are met by Mallory and a strong force of police officers at the hospital as Jody is about to go into labor. She is rescued by Frank from the maternity ward before she goes into labour. The baby is delivered in a truck specially constructed for this purpose. They elude the people going after them.

The baby is placed with two others in a secluded confine for observation by the doctors Frank has been working with. Frank informs a skeptical Eugene about the special bond the babies have with their parents. Despite seemingly adjusting slightly to society, they take advantage of an opportunity to escape and begin wreaking havoc. While one of the other babies attacks Eugene in the pool, the Scott baby corners Jody with intentions unclear until Frank arrives to defuse the situation. Frank discovers a homing device placed in Jody's purse by her mother before taking the baby to safety. On his way in the woods, Frank is stopped by a night watchman, whose flashlight spooks the previously calm baby, and it attacks and kills Frank in an attempt to escape.

Mallory is revealed to be the father of the monster baby born in Seattle and convinces a recovering Eugene and Jody. Through a homing device placed in Jody's purse by her mother, Mallory and his people track Jody to the place in Los Angeles where her baby is taken. The baby also finds them and Jody calms a frightened Eugene as the baby only came to be a part of the family, just as Frank had said. Mallory enters with the intent to kill the baby, but it attacks him first, forcing Eugene to shoot it to save Mallory's life.

Eugene goes up to expectant couples in the street to warn them and offer his help, just as Frank Davis did to him.

== Cast ==
- Frederic Forrest as Eugene Scott
- Kathleen Lloyd as Jody Scott
- John P. Ryan as Frank Davis
- John Marley as Mr. Mallory
- Andrew Duggan as Dr. Perry
- Eddie Constantine as Dr. Forest
- Bobby Ramsen as Dr Santo De Silva
- Glenda Young as Lydia
- Melissa Inger as Valerie
- Jill Gatsb as Cindy
- Lynn Wood as Jody's Mother
- Dennis O'Flaherty as Dr Peters
- James Dixon as Det. Lt. Perkins

== Reception ==
Vincent Canby of The New York Times wrote: "Shot for shot, performance for performance, non-scare for non-scare, 'It Lives Again' surpasses the tackiness of the original, perhaps because the new work has three monster-babies instead of one." A contemporary review published in Variety reads: "Though this is all so much silliness, Cohen effectively uses a good cast topped by Frederic Forrest and Kathleen Lloyd to build up suspense for the growling, slashing attacks by the terrible tykes."

Tom Milne of The Monthly Film Bulletin praised the performances in the film, called the action sequences "sometimes superb," but writing that "the film's ideas, notably the suggestion that the mutants may be nature's answer to the problem of survival in a polluted world, are never really developed." A review published by TV Guide gave the film 3 stars out of 5, reading: "Once again Cohen uses his outrageous premise to explore with insight the fabric of American family life, power structures, and social mores--addressing such topics as corporate abuse of the public trust, abortion, and government omnipotence."

On the review aggregator website Rotten Tomatoes, the film holds an approval rating of 47% based on 15 reviews, with an average score of 4.9 out of 10.
