= Frederic Forrest =

American actor (1936–2023)

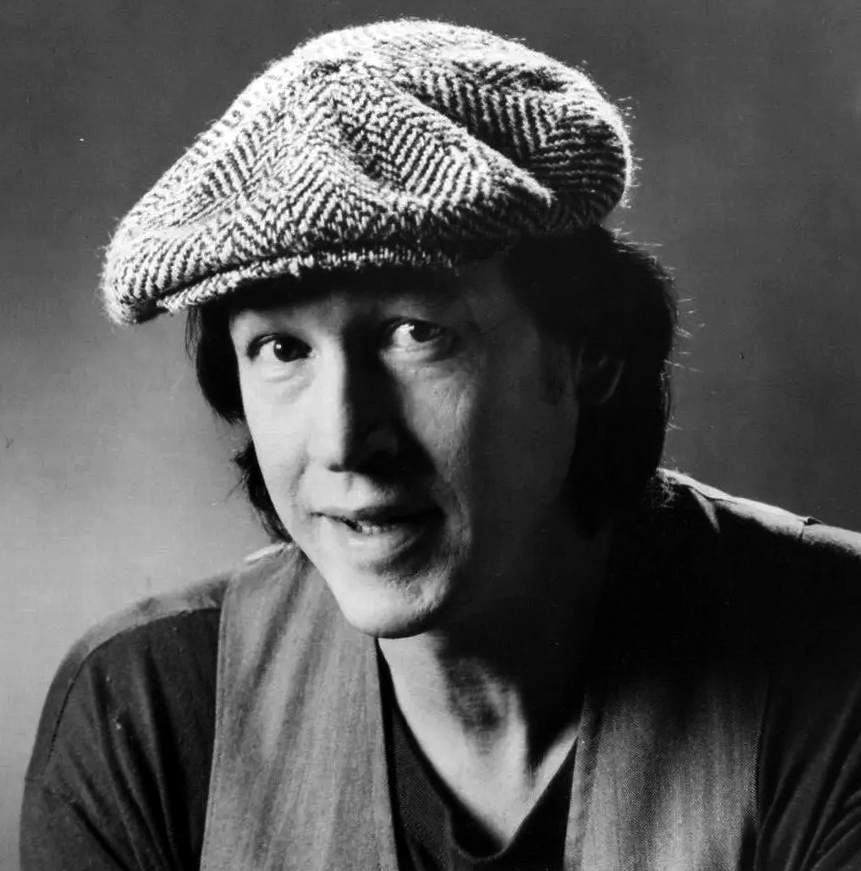
- Forrest in 1987
- Born: Frederic Fenimore Forrest Jr. December 23, 1936; Waxahachie, Texas, U.S.
- Died: June 23, 2023 (aged 86); Santa Monica, California, U.S.
- Occupation: Actor
- Years active: 1967-2006
- Spouses: Nancy Whitaker (m. 1960; div. 1963); Marilu Henner (m. 1980; div. 1982); Nina Dean (m. 1985, divorced)

Frederic Fenimore Forrest Jr. (December 23, 1936 – June 23, 2023) was an American actor. A figure of the New Hollywood movement, Forrest was best known for his collaborations with director Francis Ford Coppola, playing featured roles in The Conversation (1974), Apocalypse Now (1979), One from the Heart (1982), and Tucker: The Man and His Dream (1988). He was nominated for an Academy Award, a Golden Globe Award, a New York Film Critics Circle Award, and received a National Society of Film Critics for Best Supporting Actor for his portrayal of Huston Dyer in the musical drama The Rose (1979), an honor shared with his performance as Jay "Chef" Hicks in Apocalypse Now.

Forrest came to public attention for his performance in When the Legends Die (1972), which earned him a nomination for the Golden Globe Award for Most Promising Newcomer. His other credits include the films The Missouri Breaks (1976), Hammett (1982), Valley Girl (1983), The Two Jakes (1990), Falling Down (1993), and All the King's Men (2006) as well as the television series 21 Jump Street, Lonesome Dove, and Die Kinder.

== Career ==
During the 1960s, Frederic Forrest appeared in TV shows like Dark Shadows and Gunsmoke.

In 1966, Forrest began acting on stage in an off-Broadway production of Viet Rock. His film debut was in When the Legends Die (1972).

Forrest was known for his roles as Chef in Apocalypse Now, the neo-Nazi surplus store owner in Falling Down, a borderline-psychotic family man in the fact-based Right to Kill?, and Dashiell Hammett in Hammett (1982) and Citizen Cohn (1992). He had a role as the bandit Blue Duck in the 1989 miniseries Lonesome Dove. He was nominated for an Academy Award for his supporting role in The Rose.

Forrest also appeared in Valley Girl, The Two Jakes, The Stone Boy, The Missouri Breaks, The Deliberate Stranger (TV), Promise Him Anything (TV), and Dario Argento's first American film Trauma.

On television, he played Captain Richard Jenko on the first season 21 Jump Street in 1987. Forrest was replaced by actor Steven Williams. In 1990, he appeared as private investigator Lomax in the miniseries Die Kinder. He played Sgt. McSpadden in the U.S. Civil War-themed movie Andersonville and U.S. Army General Earle Wheeler in 2002's Path to War, the final film of director John Frankenheimer.

== Personal life ==
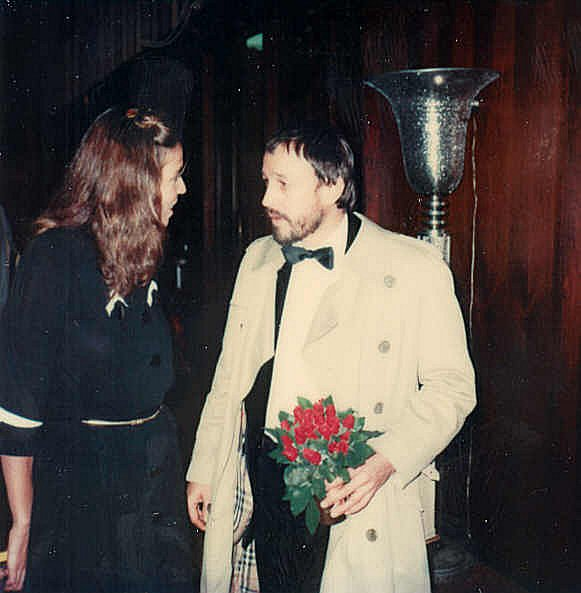
Forrest in 1979

Forrest was born on December 23, 1936 in Waxahachie, Texas, the son of Virginia Allee (née McSpadden) and Frederic Fenimore Forrest, a furniture store owner whose greenhouses provided plants for sale in retail stores. He served in the United States Army and later attended Texas Christian University, graduating in 1960 with a bachelor's degree in fine arts. In 1993, he was a recipient of TCU's Distinguished Alumni Award.

Forrest was married three times: to his college girlfriend Nancy Whitaker from 1960 to 1963, to actress Marilu Henner from 1980 to 1983, and to model Nina Dean in 1985. He did not have any children.

Forrest died at his home in Santa Monica, California on June 23, 2023 at age 86.

== Filmography ==
List of film credits
Year	Title	Role	Notes
1966	Viet Rock		
1968	The Filthy Five	Johnny Longo	credited as Matt Garth
1969	Futz!	Sugford	
1972	When the Legends Die	Tom Black Bull	Nominated – Golden Globe Award for New Star of the Year – Actor
1973	The Don Is Dead	Tony Fargo	
1974	The Conversation	Mark	
1974	The Gravy Train	Rut	
1975	Permission to Kill	Scott Allison	
1976	The Missouri Breaks	Cary	
1978	It Lives Again	Eugene Scott	
1979	Apocalypse Now	Jay "Chef" Hicks	National Society of Film Critics Award for Best Supporting Actor (also for The Rose)
1979	The Rose	Huston Dyer	National Society of Film Critics Award for Best Supporting Actor (also for Apocalypse Now); Nominated – Academy Award for Best Supporting Actor; Nominated – Golden Globe Award for Best Supporting Actor; Nominated – New York Film Critics Circle Award for Best Supporting Actor
1982	One From the Heart	Hank	
1982	Hammett	Hammett	
1983	Valley Girl	Steve Richman	
1984	The Stone Boy	Andy Jansen	
1985	Return	Brian Stoving	
1986	Where are the Children?	Courtney Parrish	
1987	Stacking	Buster McGuire	
1988	Tucker: The Man and His Dream	Eddie	
1989	Valentino Returns	Sonny Gibbs	
1989	Cat Chaser	Nolen Tyner	
1989	Music Box	Jack Burke	
1990	The Two Jakes	Chuck Newty	
1992	Twin Sisters	Delvaux	
1992	The Habitation of Dragons	Leonard Tolliver	
1992	Rain Without Thunder	Warden	
1992	Double Obsession	Paul Harkness	filmed in Boulder, distributed by Tri-Star, directed by Eduardo Montes-Bradley
1993	Falling Down	Nick, Nazi Surplus Store Owner	
1993	Trauma	Dr. Judd	
1993	Precious Victims	Sheriff Frank Yocom	
1993	Hidden Fears	Mike	
1994	Chasers	Duane	
1994	Lassie	Sam Garland	
1995	One Night Stand	Michael Joslyn	
1997	Crash Dive	Adm. Pendleton	
1997	The Brave	Lou Sr.	
1997	The End of Violence	Ranger MacDermot	
1997	One of Our Own	Maj. Ron Bridges	
1998	Boogie Boy	Edsel Dundee	
1998	Point Blank	Mac Bradford	
1998	Whatever	Mr. Chaminski	
1998	Black Thunder	Admiral Pendleton	
1998	The First 9½ Weeks	David Millman	direct-to-video film
1998	Implicated	Det. Luddy	
1999	Sweetwater	Alex (present day)	
2000	Shadow Hours	Sean	
2000	A Piece of Eden	Paulo Tredici	
2000	The Spreading Ground	Det. Mike McGivern	
2000	Militia	William Fain	
2002	The House Next Door	Vernon Crank	
2003	The Quality of Light	David	
2006	All the King's Men	Donald Stark	

== Television ==
Year	Title	Role	Notes
1967	Dark Shadows	Blue Whale customer	1 episode
1974	Larry	Larry Herman	TV movie
1978	Ruby and Oswald	Lee Harvey Oswald	TV movie
1979	$weepstake$		1 episode
1979	Mrs. Columbo	Martin	episode: "Word Games"
1979	Survival of Dana	Mr. Davies	TV movie, uncredited
1983	Who Will Love My Children?	Ivan Fray	TV movie
1983	Saigon: Year of the Cat	Bob Chesneau	TV movie
1985	Quo Vadis?	Petronius	miniseries
1985	Right to Kill?	Richard Jahnke, Sr.	TV movie
1986	The Deliberate Stranger	Det. Bob Keppel	miniseries
1987	21 Jump Street	Captain Richard Jenko	6 episodes
1988	Little Girl Lost	Tim Brady	TV movie
1988	Beryl Markham: A Shadow on the Sun	Raoul Schumacher	TV movie
1988	Gotham	Father George	TV movie
1989	Lonesome Dove	Blue Duck	3 episodes
1990	Die Kinder	Lomax	6 episodes
1992	The Young Riders	Tommy Urbach	2 episodes
1992	Citizen Cohn	Dashiell Hammett	TV movie
1994	Against the Wall	Weisbad	TV movie
1996	Andersonville	Sgt. McSpadden	TV movie
1998	Murphy Brown	Kenny	episode: "A Man and a Woman"
2002	Path to War	Earle Wheeler	TV movie
