= Hal Borland =

American writer and journalist (1900–1978)

- Born: Harold Glen Borland; May 14, 1900 Sterling, Nebraska, U.S.
- Died: February 22, 1978 (aged 77)
- Occupation: Writer, journalist, naturalist
- Education: University of Colorado; Columbia University (BA)
- Spouse: Helen Alyse Levene (died 1944); Barbara Ross Dodge
- Children: 3

Harold Glen Borland (May 14, 1900 – February 22, 1978) was an American writer, journalist and naturalist. In addition to writing many non-fiction and fiction books about the outdoors, he was a staff writer and editorialist for The New York Times.

== Early life and education ==
Borland was born on the plains in Sterling, Nebraska, to Sarah M (née Clinaburg) and William Arthur Borland. When Hal was 10, the family moved 30 miles south of Brush, Colorado, where his father staked out a homesteader's claim on the prairie. Hal later detailed his experience on the homestead in his book "High, Wide, and Lonesome." After proving out on the homestead claim, his father sold the homestead and bought a weekly newspaper in Flagler, Colorado, where Hal finished his school years. This experience is detailed in his book "Country Editor's Boy." After attending local schools, he studied at the University of Colorado from 1918 to 1920, majoring in engineering. While there, he held jobs at the Denver Post and the Flagler News. It was during this time he realized his true calling was as an author, and he soon moved to New York where he studied journalism and graduated from Columbia University in 1923 with a Bachelor of Arts degree in literature. While living in New York City, Borland came down with a life-threatening case of appendicitis. Subsequently, he and his wife, Barbara Dodge Borland, moved to Salisbury, Connecticut. This Hill, This Valley is about their first year there, and is considered a classic in American nature writing.

== Career ==
Borland started writing as a journalist for publications such as The Denver Post and the Flagler News. While attending Columbia University he wrote for the Brooklyn Times, the United Press, and King Features Service. After graduation Borland worked for a variety of newspapers across the United States, eventually settling in Philadelphia and working for Curtis Newspapers, the Philadelphia Morning Sun, and the Philadelphia Morning Ledger from 1926 until 1937.

In 1937 Borland began writing for The New York Times, first as a staff writer for The New York Times Sunday Magazine (1937-1943) and then in 1942 as an editorial writer for The New York Sunday Times, a position he held until his death in 1978. While at The Times, Borland began writing about his experience as an outdoorsman in a series of editorials that were later compiled into two books. He wrote similar pieces for the Berkshire Eagle (1958-1978), Pittsburgh Press (1966-1978), and Torrington Register (1971-1978).

Borland also wrote short stories, poetry, novels (including westerns under the pseudonym Ward West), biographical novels, non-fiction, articles for a variety of magazines, and one play.

His 1963 novel When the Legends Die was adapted for film in 1972.

== Works ==
- Heaps of Gold (1922), a collection of verse
- Rocky Mountain Tipi Tails (1924), a young adult novel.
- Valor, the Story of a Dog (1934)
- Winter poetry (1935)
- What is America? : or, America is Americans, a patriotic playlet in one act (1942)
- Halfway to Timberline (1953)
- The Amulet (1957)
- High, Wide, and Lonesome (1956, 1990), Borland's experience on the homestead south of Brush, Colorado.
- The Seventh Winter (1960)
- The Dog Who Came to Stay (1961)
- An American Year: Country Life and Landscapes Through the Seasons (1946, 1957)
- Beyond Your Doorstep: A Handbook to the Country (1962)
- When the Legends Die (1963), about the struggles of a young Ute Indian to live apart from white society, has become a young adult classic.
- How to Write and Sell Non-Fiction (1956)
- This Hill, This Valley (1957)
- The Youngest Shepherd : a tale of the Nativity (1962)
- Sundial of the Seasons: A Selection of Outdoor Editorials from the New York Times (1964)
- King of Squaw Mountain (1964)
- Sundial of the Seasons (1964)
- The History of Wildlife in America (1975, 1988) a publication of the National Wildlife Federation
- Hal Borland's Book of Days (1976)
- Our natural world : the land and wildlife of America as seen and described by writers since the country's discovery (Ed., 1969)
- Hal Borland's Twelve moons of the year : his own selections from his nature editorials in The New York times (1979, 1985)
- Countryman: A Summary of Belief (1965)
- Hill Country Harvest (1967)
- Homeland: A Report from the Country (1969)
- Country Editor's Boy (1970), growing up in Flagler, Colorado.
- Borland Country childhood memoirs (1971)
- Penny; the story of a free-soul basset hound (1972)
- This World of Wonder (1973)
- Sunrise (1975)
- A Countryman's Woods (1983)
- A Place to Begin: The New England Experience (1976) Sierra Club
- The Golden Circle: A Book of Months (1977)
- A Countryman's Flowers gardening and botany (1981)
- Plants of Christmas (1987)

== Awards and honors ==
- Meeman Award for Conservation Writing (1966)
- John Burroughs Medal for Distinguished Nature Writing (1968)
- Interpretive Naturalists Award (1973)

== Personal life ==
Borland was married twice, to Helen Alice née Le Bene until her death in 1944, and to Barbara Ross née Dodge until Borland's death in 1978. Both of his wives were also writers. Borland and Helen had three sons, Harold Glen Jr. (1925-1963), Donal William (1927-2017), and Neil Frederick (1929-1944).

In 1952, Borland and wife Barbara moved to a 100-acre farm in Connecticut, where they lived and worked until his death in 1978 at the age of 77 from emphysema.
