= Outlet Park Szczecin =

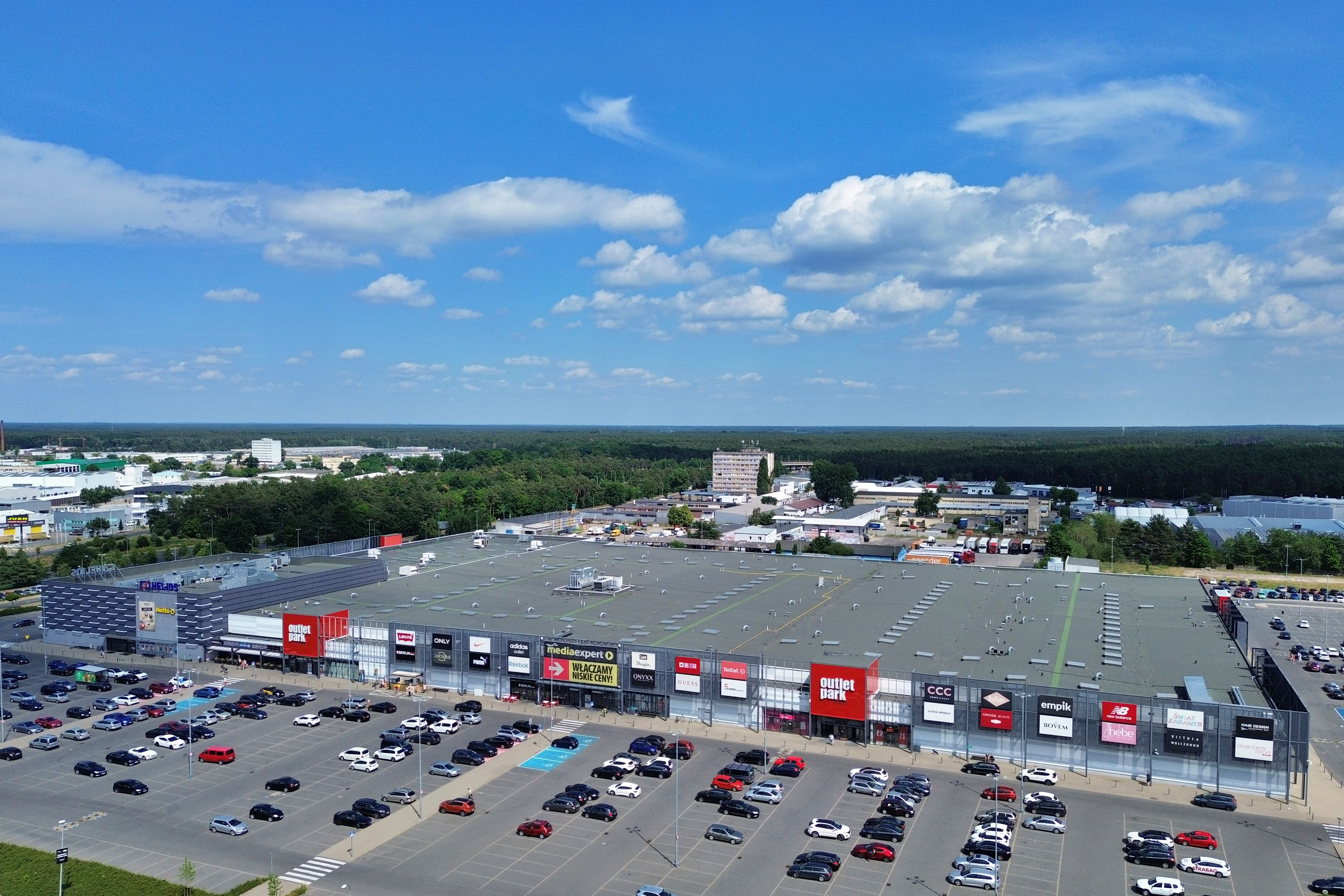
- The building in 2023.
- Interactive map of the Outlet Park Szczecin area

General information
- Type: Outlet mall
- Location: 42 Struga Street, Szczecin, Poland
- Coordinates: 53.3806°N 14.6710°E
- Construction started: June 2011
- Opened: 7 November 2012
- Owner: EPP

Technical details
- Floor count: 1
- Floor area: 31,000 m^{2}

Design and construction
- Architecture firm: Studio A4
- Developer: Echo Investment
- Main contractor: Polimex-Mostostal

Other information
- Number of stores: 120 (+12 outside)

Website
- outletpark.eu/en/

Outlet Park Szczecin (Polish: [ˈʂt͡ʂɛ.t͡ɕin]), also simply known as Outlet Park, is an outlet mall in the city of Szczecin, Poland, located at 42 Struga Street, within the neighbourhood of Osiedle Majowe within the Right Bank district. It has the total area of 31,000 m^{2}, of which 28,000 m^{2} is usable floor area, and 21,300 m^{2} is dedicated to stores and services. It makes it one of the largest outlet malls in the country. The building is owned by the company EPP. It was opened on 7 November 2012.

== History ==
Outlet Park Szczecin was constructed between June 2011 and November 2012. It was developed as an outlet mall by the company Echo Investment. The building was designed by architecture film Studio A4 based in Szczecin, with its façade being designed by the firm Open Architekci, and its interiors, by the firm S. M. Art. The Warsaw-based company Polimex-Mostostal was its main contractor. The shopping mall was originally planned to be opened in 13 September 2012, which was later delayed, with the opening taking place on 7 November 2012. Upon opening it had the total floor area of 30,200 m^{2}, of which, 24,000 m^{2} was designated for the stores. The building was later expanded internally between February and November 2015, with additional 5,000 m^{2} store area being added. Another expansion took place between May 2016 and September 2017, with addition of another 3,800 m^{2} store area. On 12 December 2025, a cinema in the mall added the IMAX scraning rooms, becoming the first in the city to offer them. In December 2025, the complex was expanded on the outside, with two rows of twelve store stalls, known as the Commercial Alley (Polish: Aleja Handlowa), streaching from the building to Struga Street.

== Characteristics ==
Outlet Park Szczecin is a one-storey outlet mall, with the total area of 31000 m^{2}, of which 28,000 m^{2} is usable floor area, and 21,300 m^{2} is dedicated to stores and services. It makes it one of the largest outlet malls in the country. It has 120 stores, as well as a cinema which includes IMAX screening rooms. The shopping mall is owned by company EPP. On the outside, it also includes two rows of twelve store stalls, known as the Commercial Alley (Polish: Aleja Handlowa), streaching from the building to Struga Street. In 2025, the complex has 1,100 parking spaces.
