= Krzekoszów =

Neighbourhood of Szczecin, Poland

- Neighbourhood
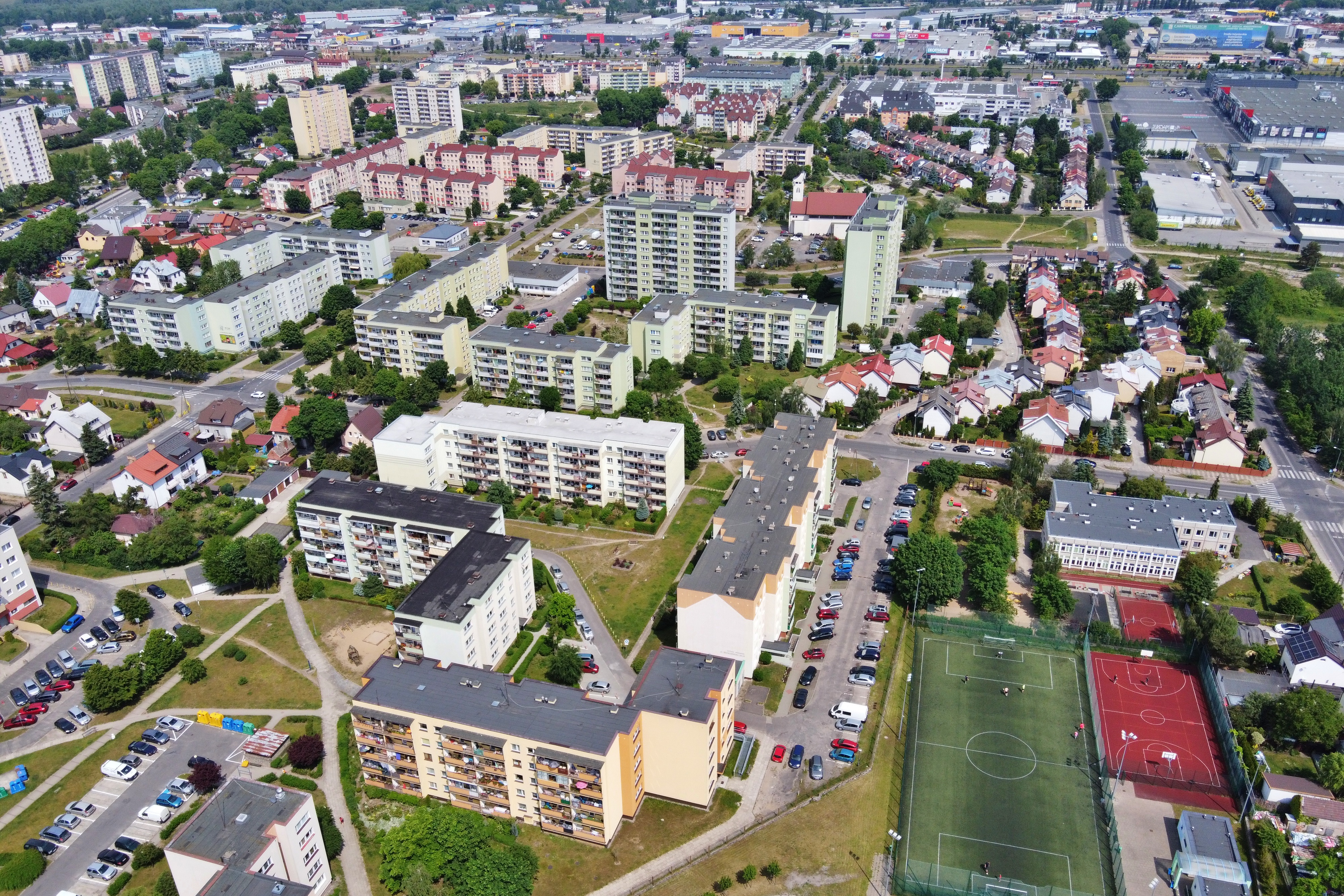
- The residential buildings in Krzekoszów, at the intersection of Maciejowa and Iwaszkiewicza Streets.
- Interactive map of Krzekoszów
- Coordinates: 53.3763°N 14.6674°E
- Country: Poland
- Voivodeship: West Pomeranian
- City and county: Szczecin
- District: Right Bank
- Administrative neighbourhood: Osiedle Majowe
- Time zone: UTC+1 (CET)
  - Summer (DST): UTC+2 (CEST)
- Area code: +48 91
- Car plates: ZS

Krzekoszów (Polish: [kʂɛˈkɔ.ʂuf]; German until 1945: Wilhelmsmühle bei Altdamm [ˈvɪl.hɛlmsˌmyː.lə ˈbaɪ̯ ˈʔalt.dam]) is a small neighbourhood of Szczecin, Poland, located within the West district, in the administrative subdivision of Osiedle Majowe. It is located to the south of Dąbrowskiej Street, and to the east of Łubianowa Street, in the area of Botaniczna, Maciejowicza, Nałkowskiej, and Ziemianicza Streets. The neighbourhood is a mixed area with mid- and high-rise apartment buildings, and low-rise detached and semi-detached homes. It used to be a farming hamlet, present in the area prior to the Second World War. It was incorporated into the city in 1939, and became separate settlement again in 1945. It was reincorporated in 1948. Beginning in 1974, and continuing throughout the 1980s, the housing estate of Osiedle Majowe, consisting of apartment buildings, was developed in its area, between its single-family housing.

== History ==
The neighbourhood of Krzekoszów was present in the area prior to the Second World War. It originally developed as a small farming hamlet with a gristmill, named Wilhelm Mill (Wilhelmsmühle). The settlement, together with its farmlands, was located in the area between the current Strugi Street to the north, Niedźwiedzia Street, Zoologiczna Street, and Dąbska Street to the east, the railway tracks to the south, and Botaniczna Street to the west. Krzekoszów was incorporated into the city of Szczecin on 15 October 1939. On 26 April 1945, during the Second World War, it was captured by the Red Army of the Soviet Union. Afterwards, it city core was placed under the Polish administration on 5 July 1945, while its suburbs were placed under Soviet military occupation, becoming separate settlements. They were relinquished to the Polish control on 5 July 1945, and the area of Krzekoszów was reincorporated into the city on 1 May 1948.

In 1974, the housing estate, named Osiedle Majowe (lit. 'May Estate'), begun being developed in the area between Gombrowicza Street to the north, Botaniczna Street to the east, Nałkowskiej Street to the south, and Łubinowa Street to the west. It was dominated by 5- and 12-storey apartment buildings. Its initial construction was finished in the 1980s. The estate also incorporated the single-family detached homes of Krzekoszów, located in the areas Łubinowej, Zaranie, and Botaniczna Streets, with the developments dating to before the Second World War. Several 4- and 11-storey apartment buildings were built between the low-rise buildings. Conteporarly, the area to the south of Dąbrowskiej Street is considered part of the neighbourhood of Krzekoszów.

On 28 November 1990, the area of Krzekoszów was incorporated into the neighbourhood of Majowe-Kijewo, which was established as one of the administrative subdivisions of the West district, being governed by an elected neighbourhood council. On 10 March 2003, they were separated into two administrative units. Following the administrative changes, Krzekoszów became part of the administrative neighbourhood of Osiedle Majowe.

== Characteristics ==
Krzekoszów is a residential neighbourhood, considered part of the housing estate of Osiedle Majowe. It is located to the south of Dąbrowskiej Street, and to the east of Łubianowa Street, in the area of Botaniczna, Maciejowicza, Nałkowskiej, and Ziemianicza Streets. The neighbourhood is a mixed area with mid- and high-rise apartment buildings, and low-rise detached and semi-detached homes.
