= Dale Payne =

American politician (1917–2008)

Member of the Nebraska Legislature from the 3rd district
- In office January 1, 1963 – January 6, 1969
- Preceded by: Edwin McHugh
- Succeeded by: Orval Keyes

Personal details
- Born: November 24, 1917 Smith County, Kansas
- Died: June 1, 2008 (aged 90) Mentone, California
- Party: Republican
- Spouse: Eleanor Petrasek (m. 1948)
- Education: Glendale Junior College; Walla Walla College
- Occupation: Real estate broker, building contractor, lobbyist

Military service
- Allegiance: United States
- Branch/service: United States Army Air Forces

Dale Payne (November 24, 1917 – June 1, 2008) was a Republican politician from Nebraska who served as a member of the Nebraska Legislature from the 3rd district from 1963 to 1969.

== Early life ==
Payne was born in Smith County, Kansas, in 1917, and grew up in Kansas. He attended Glendale Junior College and Walla Walla College, and served in the U.S. Army Air Forces during World War II. Payne moved to Bellevue, Nebraska, after the war ended, and was a building contractor with his father and lobbied for car dealers, serving as the director of the Nebraska New Car Dealers Association. He served on the state Highway Safety Committee from 1955 to 1959.

== Nebraska Legislature ==
In 1962, State Senator Edwin McHugh, who represented the Sarpy County-based 3rd district, declined to seek re-election, and Payne ran to succeed him. In the nonpartisan primary, he faced Plattsmouth Mayor Grant Roberts, postman Blase Cupich, businessman Byron Brown, and Plattsmouth School Board member Chester Sporer. Roberts placed first in the primary, winning 37 percent of the vote, and Payne narrowly placed second, receiving 22 percent of the vote to Cupich's 20 percent. Payne and Roberts advanced to the general election, which Payne narrowly won, defeating Roberts, 51–49 percent.

Payne ran for re-election to a four-year term in 1964, and was challenged by Bellevue City Councilman Waldo Shallcross. Payne placed first in the primary election by a wide margin, winning 77 percent of the vote. He won re-election in the general election by an identical margin, defeating Shallcross, 77–23 percent.

In 1968, Payne sought re-election to a third term, and was challenged by attorney Charles Reed and farmer Orval Keyes. In the primary election, Payne placed second, receiving 34 percent of the vote to Reed's 41 percent and Keyes's 25 percent. Reed and Payne advanced to the general election, but on July 24, 1968, Payne ended his campaign, citing his need to attend to his business interests.

== Post-legislative career ==
After leaving the legislature, Payne was a lobbyist for the Sarpy County Board of Supervisors, and was appointed the county's civil defense director. Payne ran for the Nebraska Railway Commission from the 1st district in 1970. In the Republican primary, he faced attorney John Finnegan, the chief counsel to the commission; businessman Walter Haase, the former secretary to the state Liquor Commission; and former Railway Commissioner Robert Marland. Payne came third in the primary, receiving 25 percent of the vote to Marland's 30 percent and Finnigan's 28 percent. He retired as the Sarpy County civil defense director in 1982.

== Death ==
Payne died on June 1, 2008.
