= Sterling, Nebraska =

- Village
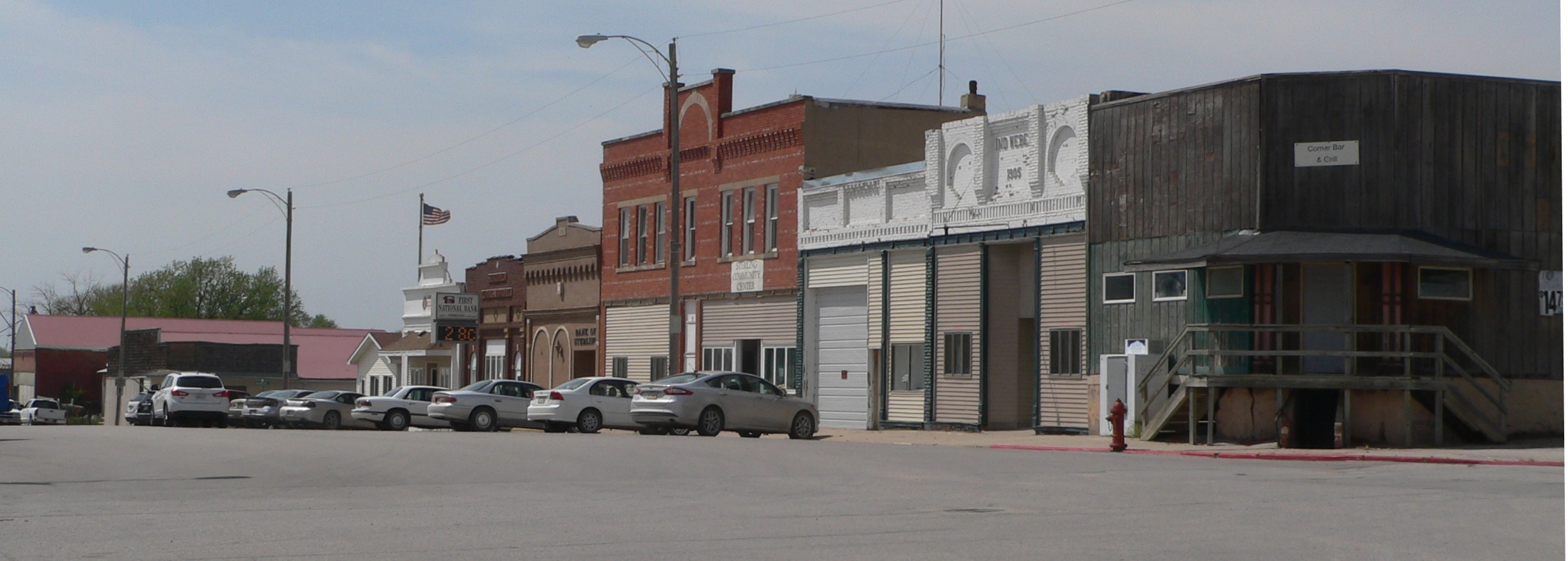
- Downtown Sterling: Broadway
- Motto: "Small Town...Big Heart"
- Location of Sterling, Nebraska
- Coordinates: 40°27′40″N 96°22′39″W
- Country: United States
- State: Nebraska
- County: Johnson

Area
  - Total: 0.41 sq mi (1.05 km^{2})
  - Land: 0.41 sq mi (1.05 km^{2})
  - Water: 0 sq mi (0.00 km^{2})
- Elevation: 1,201 ft (366 m)

Population (2020)
  - Total: 482
  - Estimate (2021): 486
  - Density: 1,190/sq mi (459/km^{2})
- Time zone: UTC-6 (Central (CST))
  - Summer (DST): UTC-5 (CDT)
- ZIP code: 68443
- Area code: 402
- FIPS code: 31-47150
- GNIS feature ID: 2399896
- Website: www.sterlingne.com

Sterling is a village in Johnson County, Nebraska, United States. The population was 482 at the 2020 census.

== History ==
Sterling was platted in 1870 when the Atchison and Nebraska Railroad was extended to that point. The village was named after Sterling, Illinois.

== Geography ==
According to the United States Census Bureau, the village has a total area of 0.41 square miles (1.06 km^{2}), all land.

== Demographics ==
Historical population
Census	Pop.	Note	%±
1900	782		—
1910	714		−8.7%
1920	804		12.6%
1930	702		−12.7%
1940	640		−8.8%
1950	547		−14.5%
1960	471		−13.9%
1970	476		1.1%
1980	526		10.5%
1990	451		−14.3%
2000	507		12.4%
2010	476		−6.1%
2020	480		0.8%
2021 (est.)	486	▲	1.3%
U.S. Decennial Census

=== 2010 census ===
As of the census of 2010, there were 476 people, 206 households, and 126 families residing in the village. The population density was 1,161.0 inhabitants per square mile (448.3/km^{2}). There were 229 housing units at an average density of 558.5 per square mile (215.6/km^{2}). The racial makeup of the village was 99.8% White and 0.2% from other races. Hispanic or Latino people of any race were 1.7% of the population.

There were 206 households, of which 30.6% had children under the age of 18 living with them, 51.5% were married couples living together, 7.8% had a female householder with no husband present, 1.9% had a male householder with no wife present, and 38.8% were non-families. 32.5% of all households were made up of individuals, and 18% had someone living alone who was 65 years of age or older. The average household size was 2.31 and the average family size was 3.02.

The median age in the village was 40.8 years. 26.5% of residents were under the age of 18; 4.3% were between the ages of 18 and 24; 23.1% were from 25 to 44; 28.7% were from 45 to 64; and 17.2% were 65 years of age or older. The gender makeup of the village was 47.7% male and 52.3% female.

=== 2000 census ===
As of the census of 2000, there were 507 people, 223 households, and 134 families residing in the village. The population density was 1,253.8 inhabitants per square mile (484.1/km^{2}). There were 234 housing units at an average density of 578.7 per square mile (223.4/km^{2}). The racial makeup of the village was 98.62% White, 0.39% Native American, and 0.99% from two or more races. Hispanic or Latino people of any race were 1.18% of the population.

There were 223 households, out of which 28.3% had children under the age of 18 living with them, 49.3% were married couples living together, 7.2% had a female householder with no husband present, and 39.9% were non-families. 36.3% of all households were made up of individuals, and 24.2% had someone living alone who was 65 years of age or older. The average household size was 2.27 and the average family size was 3.01.

In the village, the population was spread out, with 25.8% under the age of 18, 6.3% from 18 to 24, 26.0% from 25 to 44, 21.5% from 45 to 64, and 20.3% who were 65 years of age or older. The median age was 39 years. For every 100 females, there were 85.7 males. For every 100 females age 18 and over, there were 82.5 males.

As of 2000 the median income for a household in the village was $30,313, and the median income for a family was $43,036. Males had a median income of $28,839 versus $25,000 for females. The per capita income for the village was $16,302. About 4.5% of families and 6.7% of the population were below the poverty line, including 1.9% of those under age 18 and 19.0% of those age 65 or over.

== Arts and culture ==
=== Annual cultural events ===
The Johnson County Fair is an annual event held each year in August. The event includes parades, carnival rides, livestock shows and exhibits, arts and crafts, and a softball tournament.

The Antique Tractor & Machinery Show is an annual event held each year in August and is sponsored by the Deer Creek Sodbusters, a club dedicated to the preservation of America's agricultural heritage. The event began in 1983 as a plowing bee, and is now an antique show with family entertainment. The event received national recognition in 1999 when it was officially designed a "Local Legacy" by the U.S. Library of Congress.

== Parks and recreation ==
The Wirth Brothers Lake is a twenty-seven acre lake located nine miles from Sterling. The area offers tent camping, fishing, and an archery range.

== Notable persons ==
- Hal Borland, author and editor.
- Gail Kopplin, member of the Nebraska Legislature.

== Education ==
Sterling is part of the Sterling Public Schools district. The district has an elementary school, middle school and high school. Students attend Sterling High School.

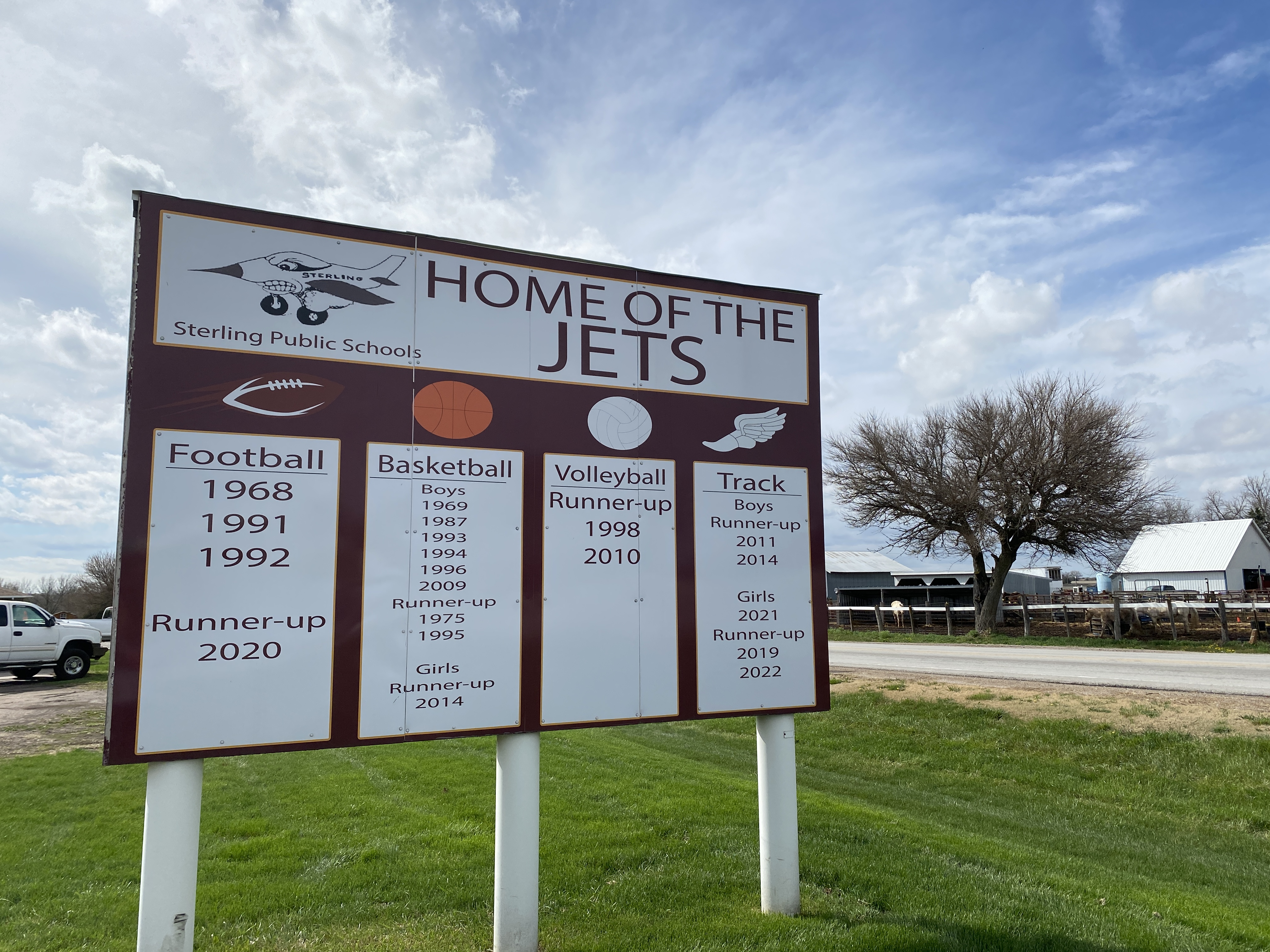
Sign featuring team state championships won by the Sterling High School Jets in Sterling, Nebraska.
