= Michael T. Avery =

American politician (1952–2023)

Member of the Nebraska Legislature from the 3rd district
- In office January 6, 1993 – January 8, 1997
- Preceded by: Emil Beyer
- Succeeded by: Jon Bruning

Personal details
- Born: February 15, 1952 (age 74) Newcastle, Wyoming
- Died: August 30, 2023 (aged 71) Omaha, Nebraska
- Party: Republican
- Children: 2 (Brandon, Shawn)
- Education: University of Nebraska–Lincoln (B.S.)
- Occupation: Wildlife biologist

Michael T. Avery (February 15, 1952 – August 30, 2023) was a Republican politician who served as a member of the Nebraska Legislature from the 3rd district from 1993 to 1997. He was originally elected as a Democrat, but later switched to the Republican Party.

== Early life ==
Avery was born in Newcastle, Wyoming, and graduated from Crawford High School in Crawford, Nebraska, in 1970. He attended the University of Nebraska, graduating with his bachelor's degree. He worked as a fish and wildlife biologist and aquatic education coordinator for the Nebraska Game and Parks Commission.

In 1980, Avery ran for the Gretna City Council from Ward I. He defeated Ruth Houser in the election, receiving 57 percent of the vote to her 43 percent. He was re-elected unopposed in 1984. In 1988, Avery ran for Mayor and was elected unopposed.

== Nebraska Legislature ==
In 1992, State Senator Emil Beyer declined to seek re-election, and Avery ran to succeed him in the 3rd district, which included most of Sarpy County in metropolitan Omaha. In a crowded primary, former Sarpy County Planning Commissioner Lynda Thorpe placed first with 26 percent of the vote. Avery narrowly beat out businessman Bob Twiss for second place, receiving 3 votes more than Twiss, which was confirmed by a recount. In the general election, Avery defeated Thorpe, winning 53 percent of the vote to Thorpe's 37 percent.

Avery ran for re-election in 1996 and was challenged by Richard Bellino, a businessman, and Jon Bruning, a business development consultant and attorney. Avery placed first in the primary, winning 47 percent of the vote to Bruning's 39 percent and Bellino's 14 percent. In the general election, the Omaha World-Herald endorsed Bruning over Avery, criticizing Avery's "relatively low profile" and his abstentions on pieces of legislation. Bruning ultimately defeated Avery by a wide margin, receiving 55 percent of the vote to Avery's 45 percent.

== Post-legislative career ==
In 1998, Avery was elected to the Gretna Board of Education. He was re-elected in 2002 unopposed, and in 2006.

Following his departure from the legislature, Avery served on the board of the Nebraska Christian Coalition. In 2000, Avery led a group of voters that placed Measure 415, an initiated constitutional amendment imposing term limits on state senators, on the ballot, which was ultimately ratified.

In 2002, following Bruning's election as Attorney General of Nebraska, Avery applied for his vacant seat, but Governor Mike Johanns ultimately appointed Ray Mossey.

Avery ran for a position on the Learning Community Coordinating Council for Douglas and Sarpy counties, which oversaw the school districts within both counties. He was elected in 2008, and re-elected in 2012, and 2016. He did not seek re-election in 2020.

== Death ==
Avery died in Omaha, Nebraska, on August 30, 2023.
