= Kathleen Lloyd =

American actress (born 1948)

- Born: Kathleen Gackle; September 13, 1948 (age 78); Santa Clara, California, U.S.
- Other name: Kathy Lloyd
- Education: University of California, Los Angeles
- Occupations: Actress; musician
- Years active: 1970–2004

Kathleen Lloyd (also credited as Kathleen Gackle) (born September 13, 1948) is an American actress and musician known for her role as the female lead in The Missouri Breaks (1976), opposite Marlon Brando and Jack Nicholson. She also appeared in the horror films The Car (1977) and It Lives Again (1978).

== Early years ==
Lloyd was born in Santa Clara, California. She is the daughter of a poultry farmer from Santa Maria, California. She had also been a musician, and her mother had been a flamenco dancer. She left the University of California, Los Angeles to venture into acting after winning a Hugh O'Brian Acting Award.

== Career ==
Lloyd made more than 80 screen appearances between 1970 and 2003, almost all in television series, including a recurring role as Assistant District Attorney Carol Baldwin on Magnum, P.I. from 1983 to 1988. She also had recurring roles on The Gangster Chronicles as Stella Siegel, and Hill Street Blues as Nurse Linda Wulfawitz.

In the early-to-mid-1970s, Lloyd was billed sometimes as Kathy Lloyd and sometimes as Kathleen Gackle.

== Filmography ==
- Room 222 (TV series, 1970, season 1 episode 23, "I Love You Charlie, I Love You Abbie") as Abbie
- Marcus Welby MD (TV Series, 1970, season 2, episode 1, "A Very Special Sailfish") as Angela
- Bearcats! (1971, episode 1, "The Devil Wears Armor") as Sister Catalina
- Adam-12 (TV series, 1972, episode: “The Wednesday Warrior”) as Tawnia Baker
- The Sixth Sense (TV series, 1972, episode: "The Eyes That Wouldn't Die") as Kathy Turner
- Ironside (TV series, 1972, episode: "His Fiddlers Three") as Diane Lombard
- Ironside (TV series, 1973, episode: "The Best Laid Plans") as Bank Teller
- Incident on a Dark Street (1973, TV movie)
- Kung Fu (Tv series, 1973, episode: “Blood Brother”)
- Such Dust as Dreams Are Made On (1973, pilot movie for Harry O)
- Emergency! (1972, episode: "Musical Mania")
- Harry O (1975, episode: "Silent Kill")
- Sorority Kill (1974, TV movie)
- Medical Center (TV series) (1974, episode: "Saturday's Child")
- The Missouri Breaks (1976) as Jane Braxton
- The Car (1977)
- Skateboard (1978)
- It Lives Again (1978)
- Lacy and the Mississippi Queen (1978, TV movie)
- Hart to Hart (1979, episode: "You Made Me Kill You" Sea 1 Ep 5) as Peggy
- High Midnight (1979, TV movie)
- Take Down (1979)
- Make Me an Offer (1980, TV movie)
- The White Shadow (1980, episode: "Gonna Fly Now") as Paula
- The Incredible Hulk (1980, episode: "On the Line") as Randy Phelps
- The Jayne Mansfield Story (1980, TV movie)
- The Choice (1981, TV movie)
- The Gangster Chronicles (1981, miniseries) as Stella Siegel
- Strike Force (1981, episode: "The Predator") as Lucy Durrant
- Magnum, P.I. (1982-1988, TV series, 21 episodes)
- Simon and Simon (1982, TV series episode: “Guessing Game “)
- Shooting Stars (1983, TV movie)
- Cagney & Lacey (1983, TV series episode: "Date Rape")
- Airwolf (1984, TV series) (Episode "To Snare a Wolf") as Antonia Donatelli
- Obsessed with a Married Woman (1985, TV movie)
- Sins of the Father (1985, TV movie)
- Murder, She Wrote (1986, episode: "Obituary for a Dead Anchor") as Paula Roman
- Stingray (1986, Season 1, Episode 6: "Sometimes You Gotta Sing The Blues") as Candice
- Best Seller (1987)
- The Law & Harry McGraw (1987, Episode 6: She's Not Wild About Harry) as Gwen Kellogg
- The Man with Three Wives (1993, TV movie)
- Babylon 5 (1997, episode: "The Deconstruction of Falling Stars") as Elizabeth Metarie
- Diagnosis: Murder (1999), episode: "Gangland" as Emma Bornstein
- One Last Flight (1999)
