= Emil Beyer (Nebraska politician) =

American politician (1929–2014)

Member of the Nebraska Legislature from the 3rd district
- In office January 7, 1981 – January 6, 1993
- Preceded by: Orval Keyes
- Succeeded by: Michael T. Avery

Personal details
- Born: May 20, 1929 Omaha, Nebraska
- Died: November 21, 2014 (aged 85) Gretna, Nebraska
- Party: Republican
- Spouse: Barbara
- Children: 4 (Linda, Diane, Randall, Vicki)
- Occupation: Catering, real estate development and investments

Emil E. Beyer (May 20, 1929 – November 21, 2014) was a Republican politician from Nebraska who served as a member of the Nebraska Legislature from the 3rd district from 1981 to 1993.

== Early life ==
Beyer was born in Omaha, Nebraska, in 1929. He worked in business, owning and operating a catering business, a real estate development and investment firm, and a trucking company. Beyer served on the Papillion La Vista School Board, and then moved to Gretna, where he was elected Police Magistrate and served on the city planning board.

== Nebraska Legislature ==
In 1980, Beyer announced that he would challenge incumbent State Senator Orval Keyes in the 3rd district, which was based in Sarpy County. In the primary election, Keyes placed first over Beyer, winning 54 percent of the vote to Beyer's 46 percent. They advanced to the general election, where Beyer defeated Keyes, winning 55–45 percent.

Beyer ran for re-election in 1984, and was challenged by Linda Garvin, a Millard teacher. Garvin placed first over Beyer in the primary election, winning 58 percent of the vote to Beyer's 42 percent. Though the Nebraska Democratic Party targeted Beyer for defeat, and though the race was expected to be close, Beyer defeated Garvin with 55 percent of the vote.

In 1988, Beyer ran for re-election to a third term, and was challenged by Wayne Miller, a librarian and student at the University of Nebraska at Omaha. In the primary, Beyer placed first over Miller, winning 61 percent of the vote to Miller's 39 percent.

Beyer declined to seek re-election in 1992, saying that he and his wife had decided to "devote our time and energy to our family and business interests."

== Death ==
Beyer died on November 21, 2014.
