= Victor Rountree =

Nebraskan state senator

Member of the Nebraska Legislature from the 3rd district
- Incumbent
- Assumed office January 8, 2025
- Preceded by: Carol Blood

Personal details
- Born: June 16, 1959 (age 66) Wilson, North Carolina
- Party: Democratic
- Spouse: Cheryl
- Children: 3
- Education: University of Maryland, Community College of the Air Force

Victor Rountree (born June 16, 1959) is an American politician from Bellevue, Nebraska, who has served in the Nebraska Legislature representing the 3rd district since 2025.
