= John P. Ryan =

American actor (1936–2007)

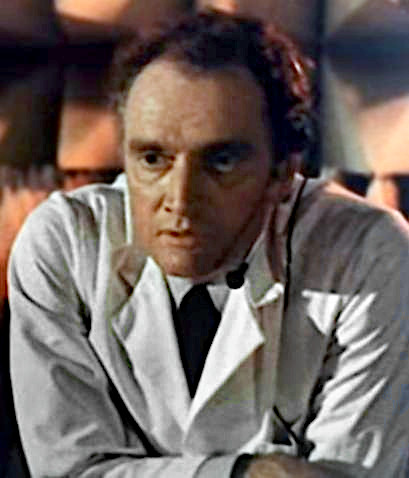
- Ryan in Futureworld, 1976
- Born: July 30, 1936; New York City, U.S.
- Died: March 20, 2007 (aged 70); Los Angeles, California, U.S.
- Education: City College of New York; Actors Studio
- Occupation: Actor
- Years active: 1966–1996
- Children: 3, including Alexa Kenin

John Patrick Ryan (July 30, 1936 – March 20, 2007) was an American actor. A prolific character actor known for playing "slimy villains, tough cops, and military officers," he worked with notable directors like Bob Rafelson, Francis Ford Coppola, Andrei Konchalovsky, Arthur Penn, Philip Kaufman, and The Wachowskis, and often appeared in films starring his friend Jack Nicholson.

== Early life and education ==
Ryan was born in New York City, the son of Irish immigrant parents, and graduated from Rice High School in Harlem. He studied English at the City College of New York and acting at the Actors Studio.

== Career ==
Among his stage roles, Ryan played King Henry in The Lion in Winter and Mr. DePinna in You Can't Take It with You at the 1966 Williamstown Theatre Festival. He starred in the Broadway productions Daphne in Cottage D (1967) and Medea (1973).

Ryan got into film acting at the encouragement of his friend Jack Nicholson. He appeared opposite Nicholson in Five Easy Pieces (1970), The King of Marvin Gardens (1973), The Missouri Breaks (1976), The Postman Always Rings Twice (1981), and Hoffa (1992).

He usually played supporting roles or character parts, though he played a rare leading role in the Larry Cohen-directed horror film It's Alive and its sequel It Lives Again. He also appeared in such films as Dillinger (1973), Futureworld (1976), Breathless (1983), The Right Stuff (also 1983), The Cotton Club (1984), Three O'Clock High (1987), and Best of the Best (1989). One of his best-known parts was as prison warden Ranken in Runaway Train (1985). His last role was as mobster Mickey Malnato in The Wachowskis' directorial debut Bound (1996).

=== Helicopter crash ===
On May 16, 1989, while filming the Chuck Norris sequel Delta Force 2: The Colombian Connection in the Philippines, Ryan was involved in a helicopter crash. The helicopter took off to film a scene, then veered to the left and plunged into a forty-foot ravine. Four people on board were killed and roughly ten people were hospitalized, including Ryan.

== Personal life ==
Ryan was married to actress Maya Kenin, becoming the stepfather of Alexa Kenin (1962–1985). He had two daughters. Ryan was a life member of the Actors Studio, and a member of the Academy of Motion Picture Arts and Sciences.

=== Death ===
Ryan died from a stroke in Los Angeles, California, at the age of 70.

== Stage appearances ==
Year	Title	Role	Venue	Notes
1963	The Lady of the Camellias	Buyer	Winter Garden Theatre, Broadway	
1966	Serjeant Musgrave's Dance	Constable	Lucille Lortel Theatre, Off-Broadway	
1966	Duet for Three	John	Cherry Lane Theatre, Off-Broadway	
1966	You Can't Take It with You	Mr. DePinna	Williamstown Theatre Festival	
1966	The Lion in Winter	King Henry	Williamstown Theatre Festival	
1966-67	Yerma	Villager / Victor (understudy)	Vivian Beaumont Theater, Broadway	
1967	Daphne in Cottage D	Joseph	Longacre Theatre, Broadway	
1970	Nobody Hears a Broken Drum	Jamie O'Hanlin	Fortune Theater, Off-Broadway	
1972	The Love Suicide at Schofield Barracks	Maj. Cassidy	ANTA Playhouse, Broadway	
1972	Gypsy	Rich Man's Son	Theatre at Unitarian Church of AllSouls, Off-Broadway	
1972	The Silent Partner	Mr. Drumm	Actors Studio Theatre, Off-Broadway	
1972	Twelve Angry Men	Juror No. 3	Queens Theatre in the Park	
1973	Medea	Jason	Circle in the Square Theatre, Broadway	
1975	The Country Girl		Stagewest, West Springfield	

== Filmography ==
=== Film ===
Year	Title	Role	Notes
1967	The Tiger Makes Out	Toni's Escort	
1968	A Lovely Way to Die	Harry Samson	
1968	What's So Bad About Feeling Good?	Roger	Uncredited
1970	Five Easy Pieces	Spicer	
1971	Been Down So Long It Looks Like Up to Me	'Oeuf'	
1972	The Legend of Nigger Charley	Martin Goldman	
1972	The King of Marvin Gardens	Houston	
1973	Shamus	'Hardcore'	
1973	Dillinger	Charles Makley	
1973	Cops and Robbers	Pasquale 'Patsy' Aniello	
1974	It's Alive	Frank Davis	
1976	The Missouri Breaks	Si	
1976	Futureworld	Dr. Schneider	
1978	It Lives Again	Frank Davis	
1980	On the Nickel		
1980	The Last Flight of Noah's Ark	Coslough	
1981	The Postman Always Rings Twice	Ezra Liam Kennedy	
1982	The Escape Artist	Vernon	
1983	Breathless	Lt. Parmental	
1983	The Right Stuff	Head of Program	
1984	The Cotton Club	Joe Flynn	
1985	Runaway Train	Warden Ranken	
1986	Avenging Force	Prof. Elliott Glastenbury	
1987	Three O'Clock High	Mr. O'Rourke	
1987	Fatal Beauty	Lt. Kellerman	
1987	Death Wish 4: The Crackdown	Ferrari / Fake Nathan White	
1987	Rent-a-Cop	Cmdr. Wieser	
1987	City of Shadows	Sgt. Fireman	
1989	Best of the Best	Jennings	
1990	Delta Force 2: The Colombian Connection	Gen. Taylor	
1990	Class of 1999	Mr. Hardin	
1990	Eternity	Thomas Vandervere / Prosecutor	
1992	White Sands	Arms Dealer	Uncredited
1992	Hoffa	"Red" Bennett	
1992	Star Time	Sam Bones	
1993	Batman: Mask of the Phantasm	'Buzz' Bronski (voice)	
1993	Young Goodman Brown	The Devil	
1994	The Patriots	Arthur	
1994	Bad Blood	John Blackstone	
1995	Tall Tale	'Grub'	
1996	Bound	Mickey Malnato	Final film role

=== Television ===
Year	Title	Role	Notes
1973	Kojak	Peter Ibbotson	Episode: "Cop in the Cage"
1975	Death Scream	Det. Dave Lambert	Television film
1977	The Rockford Files	Dearborn	Episode: "Dirty Money, Black Light"
1980	Buck Rogers in the 25th Century	Kurt Belzack	Episode: "Twiki is Missing"
1983	M*A*S*H	Major Van Zandt	Episode: "That Darn Kid"
1983	Miss Lonelyhearts	Peter Doyle	Television film
1984	Simon & Simon	Stewart Crawford	Episode: "Break a Leg, Darling"
1985	Cagney & Lacey	Philip Corrigan	Episode: "Organized Crime"
1986	Houston: The Legend of Texas	David G. Burnet	Television film
1989	Miami Vice	Jake Manning	Episode: "The Cell Within"
1993	The Adventures of Brisco County, Jr.	Sheriff Bob Cavendish	Episode: "Showdown"
