= Nebraska Crossing =

Outdoor lifestyle center in Gretna, Nebraska, U.S.

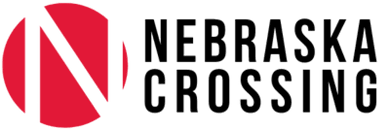
- Location: Gretna, Nebraska, United States
- Coordinates: 41°5′55.34″N 96°15′0.60″W
- Address: 21209 Nebraska Crossing Drive
- Opened: October 1993
- Developer: OTB Destination, LLC
- Manager: OTB Destination, LLC
- Owner: OTB Destination, LLC
- Architect: Avant Architects
- Num. of stores: 85
- Num. of anchor tenants: 9
- Floor area: 350,000 sq ft (33,000 m^{2})
- Website: nexcrossing.com

Nebraska Crossing, also referred to as NEX Crossing, is an outdoor lifestyle center in Gretna, Nebraska, United States with over 85 global and national retail brands. Originally conceived in 1990, the mall opened in October 1993 and was largely redeveloped in 2013. Its anchor stores are Tory Burch, Kate Spade New York, Polo Ralph Lauren, Nike, Under Armour, Coach, Michael Kors, UNTUCKit, Tecovas, and Vineyard Vines.

== History ==
In July 1990, a commercial area was announced and planned to be built on Interstate 80 located right outside Omaha, Nebraska. The factory outlet would cost $15 million and would be known as the Nebraska Crossing Manufacturers Outlet. Despite initial plans to break ground in early 1991, financial difficulties pushed its groundbreaking to 1992. Construction began in late 1992 and the mall began to open in October 1993. By 1995, the mall had 56 stores and total area of 200,000 square feet (0.0072 sq mi).

In December 2010, a major redevelopment plan was announced for Nebraska Crossing. These plans would increase the amount of property to 310,000 square feet (0.011 sq mi). In spite of initial plans to expand the original building, in late 2012 it was announced that the original building be demolished. The building would then be replaced with a new $70 million facility. As a part of the redevelopment, the mall changed its name to Smart Outlets at Nebraska Crossing. Demolition began in early 2013 and was completed by May. Construction of the new mall began shortly after. The mall officially re-opened in November 2013.

Despite concerns from public health officials, Nebraska Crossing became one of the first malls to re-open during the COVID-19 pandemic.

In January 2024, a $3.2 billion expansion project to Nebraska Crossing, titled, "The Good Life District," was announced. In January 2025, Rod Yates, an approved applicant for the project, notified the state that the project would not be viable under current conditions. Gretna mayor Mike Evans expressed disappointment that his and Yates' visions did not align.

By February 2025, Yates team outlined Legislative Bill 637, which would establish the Destination Nebraska Act, which would drastically expand Nebraska Crossing. It would Additionally, Yates came out with a new plan to de-annex Nebraska Crossing from Gretna in favor of making it become its own village. In 2026
