= Scott Price (politician) =

American politician

Member of the Nebraska Legislature from the 3rd district
- In office 2009–2013
- Preceded by: Gail Kopplin
- Succeeded by: Tommy Garrett

Personal details
- Born: August 5, 1962 (age 64) White Sands Missile Range, New Mexico, United States
- Party: Republican

Scott Price (born August 5, 1962) is a politician from the U.S. state of Nebraska. A resident of Bellevue, Price served from 2009 to 2013 in the unicameral Nebraska Legislature. He was born at White Sands Missile Range in New Mexico.

== State legislature ==
Price was elected in 2008 to represent the 3rd Nebraska legislative district. He sat on the Agriculture, General Affairs, and Government, Military and Veterans Affairs committees. Price resigned from the legislature on November 1, 2013.
