= Gail Kopplin =

American politician (1939–2021)

Member of the Nebraska Legislature from the 3rd district
- In office 2005–2009
- Preceded by: Ray Mossey
- Succeeded by: Scott Price

Personal details
- Born: May 20, 1939 Sterling, Nebraska, U.S.
- Died: January 13, 2021 (aged 81)

Gail Kopplin (May 20, 1939 – January 13, 2021) was a politician from the U.S. state of Nebraska. From 2005 to 2009, he represented the 3rd District in the unicameral Nebraska Legislature. Kopplin was a retired school administrator.

Kopplin was born in Sterling, Nebraska and graduated from Peru State College in 1966. He attended the University of Nebraska–Lincoln, earning an education specialist certificate in 1982 and a Master's degree in education in 1988.

He was elected in 2004 to represent the 3rd Nebraska legislative district. Kopplin sat on the Education and Natural Resources committees. In 2008, he lost a re-election bid to Scott Price.
