= Tommy Garrett (Nebraska politician) =

American politician

Member of the Nebraska Legislature from the 3rd district
- In office 2013–2017
- Preceded by: Scott Price
- Succeeded by: Carol Blood

Personal details
- Born: June 4, 1954 (age 72) Keesler Air Force Base; Biloxi, Mississippi, U.S.
- Party: Republican
- Occupation: Consultant, retired Air Force colonel

Tommy Garrett (born June 4, 1954) is a politician from the U.S. state of Nebraska. In 2013, he was appointed to fill a vacancy in the unicameral Nebraska Legislature, representing a district in Sarpy County, in the Omaha metropolitan area. Garrett is a member of the Republican Party. In Nebraska, the legislature is non-partisan.

== Early life and career ==
Garrett was born at Keesler Air Force Base in Biloxi, Mississippi. His father died when he was 13, and the family settled in Colorado; Garrett graduated from William C. Hinkley High School in Aurora, Colorado, in 1972. In 1976, he received a B.S. in business management from Colorado State University; in the same year, he joined the U.S. Air Force. He received an M.S. in international relations from Troy State University in 1986, and an M.S. in national security strategy from the National War College in 2000.

In 1977, Garrett married Julie Ann Cullen; the couple produced three children.

In the Air Force, Garrett worked in the field of intelligence. He served overseas in Operation Desert Storm and in Operation Iraqi Freedom. Garrett and his family moved 17 times during his 26 years in the military, ending at Offutt Air Force Base in Bellevue, Nebraska, where he retired in 2003 with the rank of colonel.

After leaving the Air Force, Garrett spent four years working as a manager for a major defense contractor. In 2007, he founded the Garrett Group in Bellevue; the disabled-veteran-owned business provides security, intelligence, and information security consulting to the Defense Department.

== Nebraska Legislature ==
In November 2013, state senator Scott Price of Bellevue resigned his seat in the Legislature, citing family responsibilities. Price had represented the 3rd District, consisting of part of eastern Sarpy County, including parts of Bellevue and Papillion. Governor Dave Heineman, charged with naming a replacement, announced that he was appointing Bellevue businessman Patrick Shannon, who had unsuccessfully run for the position in 2004. Hours after Heineman's announcement, Shannon withdrew his name from consideration, stating that the need to care for his elderly parents took precedence. Several of Nebraska's major media outlets noted that he had never paid a $16,000 fine arising from 2004 campaign-law violations, and suggested that this might have influenced his decision to withdraw. On December 11, 2013, Heineman announced that he was naming Garrett to the post; Garrett was sworn in that day.

=== 2014 election ===
In 2014, an election was held to determine who would fill the remaining two years of the four-year legislative term. Garrett ran for the position; he was challenged by Carol Blood, a member of the Bellevue City Council. In the nonpartisan primary election, Garrett, a Republican, received 1747 of the 3453 votes cast, or 50.6% of the total; Blood, a Democrat, received 1706 votes, or 49.4%.

As the top two vote-getters, both moved on to the general election. Each candidate claimed to be the one who best understood, and who could do the most for, small businesses. Each declared that taxes needed to be lowered for veterans and retirees. Garrett decried "needless government regulation"; Blood called for more promotion of wind energy in Nebraska, stating that it would create many jobs.

Over the entire course of the election, Garrett's campaign raised over $84,000, and spent nearly $87,000. Major contributions included over $9000 from the Nebraska Chamber of Commerce & Industry PAC and over $3500 from the Greater Omaha Chamber of Commerce PAC, $8200 from the Nebraska Farm Bureau Federation, $7000 from the Nebraska Bankers State PAC, $4500 from the Nebraska Realtors PAC, and $3000 from the Republican State Leadership Committee. Blood raised about $49,500 and spent over $57,000. Major contributions to her campaign included $4000 from the Nebraska Association of Trial Attorneys PAC, $4000 from the Nebraska Hospital Association PAC, $2500 from Firefighters for Better Government, $2500 from two International Brotherhood of Electrical Workers locals, and about $1800 from the Nebraska Democratic Party.

In the general election, Garrett received 4845 of the 9024 votes cast, or 53.7% of the total. Blood received 4179 votes, or 46.3%.

=== 2016 election ===
In 2016, Garrett ran against Blood a second time for his incumbent seat. However, Garrett was defeated by Blood, who received 7,959 votes, or 51.4%. Garrett received 7,476 of the votes cast, or 48.3%.

=== Legislative tenure ===
==== 2015 session ====
In the Legislature, Garrett served as chairman of the Rules Committee; as vice-chairman of the Government, Military, and Veterans Affairs Committee; and on the Transportation and Telecommunications Committee, and the Committee on Committees.

Among the "most significant" actions taken by the Legislature in its 2015 session were three bills that passed over vetoes by governor Pete Ricketts. LB268 repealed the state's death penalty; LB623 reversed the state's previous policy of denying driver's licenses to people who were living illegally in the United States after being brought to the country as children, and who had been granted exemption from deportation under the Barack Obama administration's Deferred Action for Childhood Arrivals (DACA) program; and LB610 increased the tax on gasoline to pay for repairs to roads and bridges. Garrett voted in favor of the death-penalty repeal, and to override Ricketts's veto of the measure; he voted for passage of LB623, and to override the gubernatorial veto; and he voted against the gas-tax increase, and to sustain the veto.

==== 2016 session ====
In its 2016 session, the Nebraska legislature passed three bills that Ricketts then vetoed. LB580 would have created an independent commission of citizens to draw new district maps following censuses; supporters described it as an attempt to de-politicize the redistricting process, while Ricketts maintained that the bill delegated the legislature's constitutional duty of redistricting to "an unelected and unaccountable board". Garrett voted for the bill in its 29–15 passage. Sponsor John Murante opted not to seek an override of the governor's veto.

A second vetoed bill, LB935, would have changed state audit procedures. The bill passed by a margin of 37–8, with 4 present and not voting; Garrett was among those voting in favor. The bill was withdrawn without an attempt to override the veto; the state auditor agreed to work with the governor on a new version for the next year's session.

A third bill passed over Ricketts's veto. LB947 made DACA beneficiaries eligible for commercial and professional licenses in Nebraska. The bill passed the Legislature on a vote of 33–11–5; the veto override passed 31–13–5. Garrett voted for the bill, and for the override of Ricketts's veto.

The legislature failed to pass LB10, greatly desired by the Republican Party, which would have restored Nebraska to a winner-take-all scheme of allocating its electoral votes in U.S. presidential elections, rather than continuing its practice of awarding the electoral vote for each congressional district to the candidate who received the most votes in that district. Supporters were unable to break a filibuster; in the 32–17 cloture motion, Garrett was among those who voted against the bill.
