= Gretna, Nebraska =

City in Sarpy County, Nebraska, United States

- City
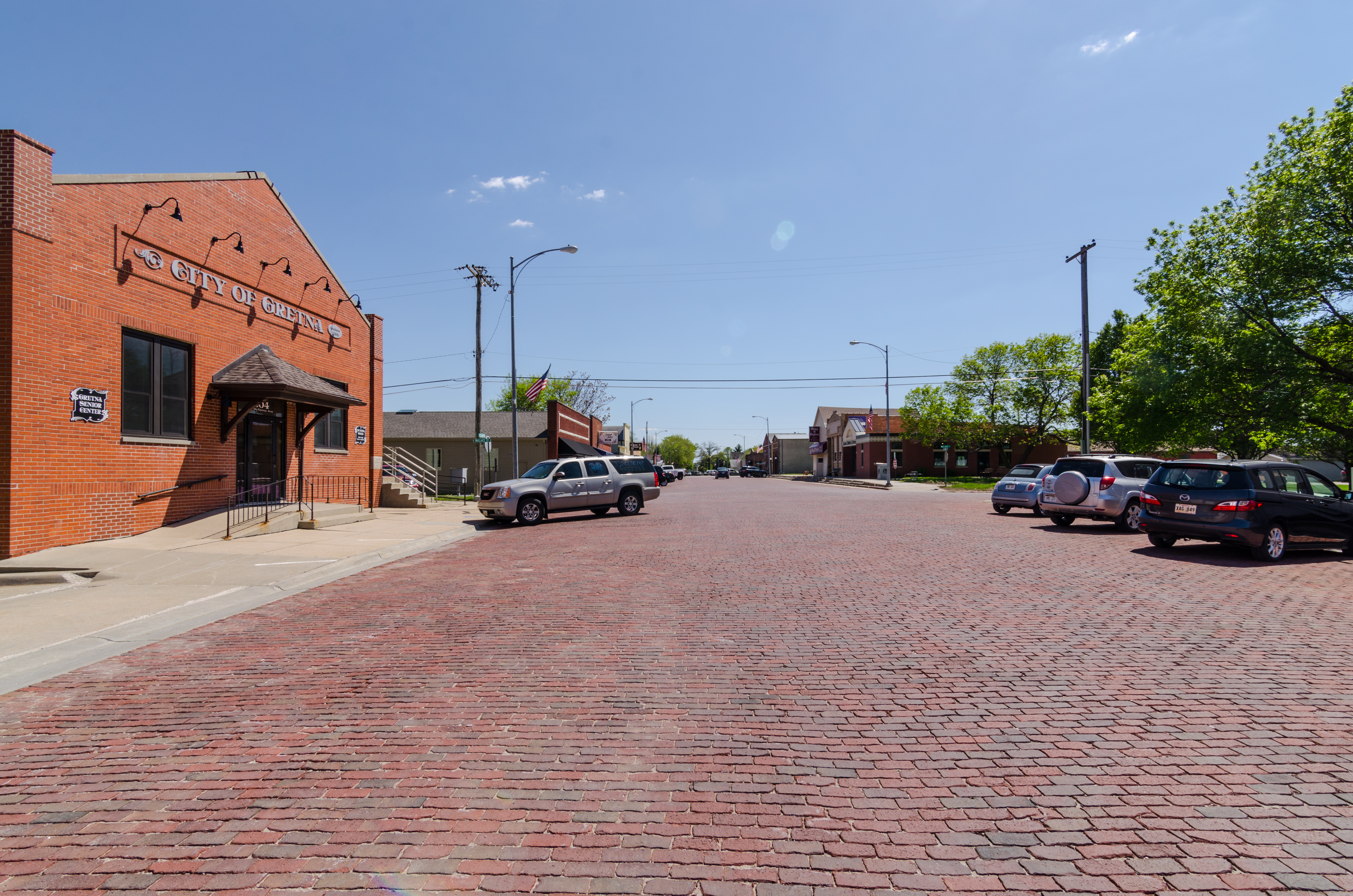
- Downtown looking south on McKenna Avenue, May 2017

- Location of Gretna, Nebraska
- Coordinates: 41°08′27″N 96°14′23″W
- Country: United States
- State: Nebraska
- County: Sarpy
- Founded: Summer of 1886
- Incorporated: July 10, 1889

Government
  - Mayor: Mike Evans

Area
  - Total: 7.049 sq mi (18.257 km^{2})
  - Land: 6.951 sq mi (18.003 km^{2})
  - Water: 0.097 sq mi (0.251 km^{2})
- Elevation: 1,112 ft (339 m)

Population (2020)
  - Total: 5,083
  - Estimate (2023): 9,207
  - Density: 1,302/sq mi (502.8/km^{2})
- Time zone: UTC−6 (Central (CST))
  - Summer (DST): UTC−5 (CDT)
- ZIP Code: 68028
- Area codes: 402 and 531
- FIPS code: 31-20260
- GNIS feature ID: 2394248
- Sales tax: 7.5%
- Website: gretnane.org

Gretna is a city in Sarpy County, Nebraska, United States. It is part of the Omaha metropolitan area and considered a suburban bedroom community for Omaha. The city's population was 5,083 at the 2020 census and estimated to be 9,071 in 2022.

== History ==
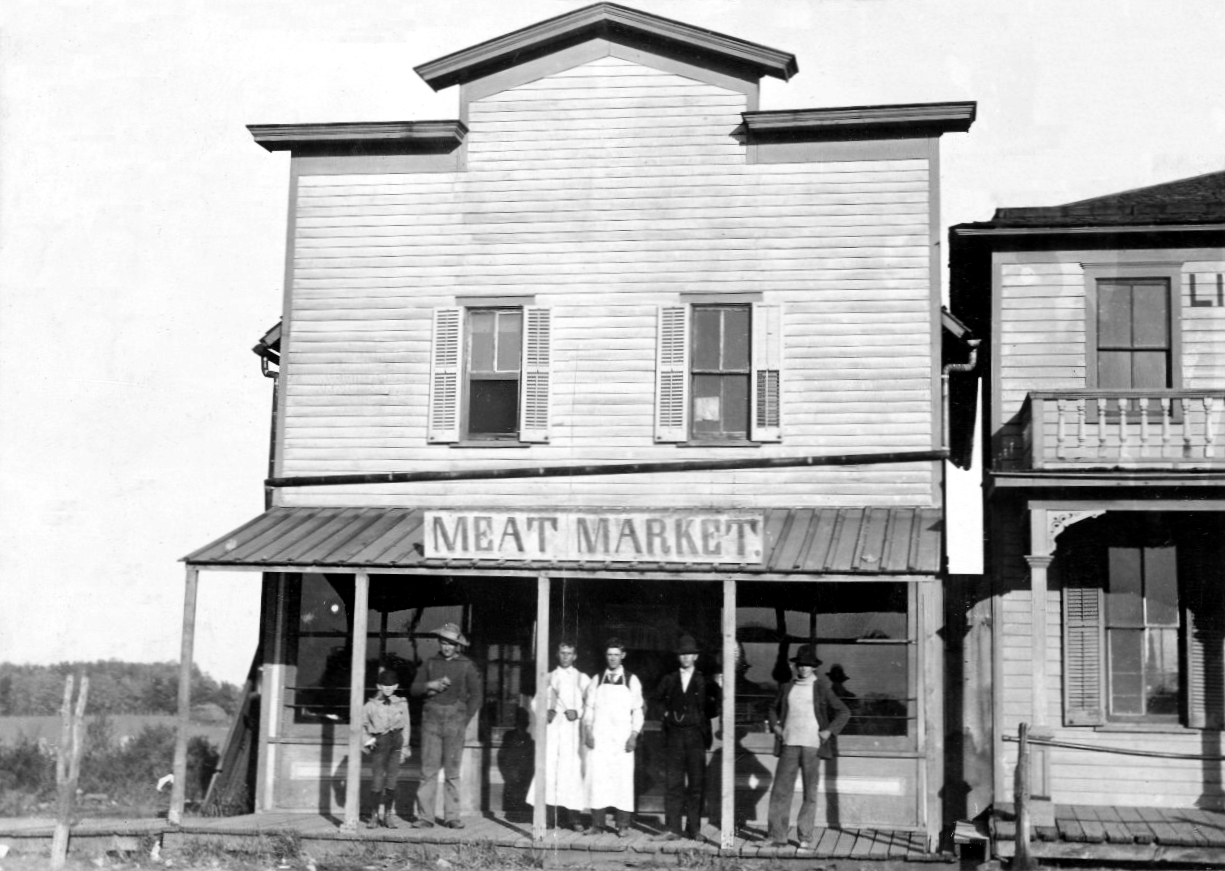
Meat Market in Gretna, circa 1895

Gretna started shortly after the Burlington Railroad built a short line between Omaha and Ashland in the summer of 1886. Advent of the village of Gretna on this new laid rail line was the cue for the exit of the nearby trading post of Forest City, which had existed since 1856. In its day, Forest City, located 2.5 miles southwest of where Gretna now stands, was a flourishing and busy place, but it was doomed by the railroad which passed it by. The only markers that exist today to show the site of old Forest City is the cemetery (Holy Sepulchre) which is located a little to the east of what was the center of activity in the settlement and the 1886 homestead originally owned by the Schnack Family and located on Schnack Acres at 234th St. Names that were prominent in the beginnings of Forest City were the families of Adolph Schnack, William Langdon, John Thomas and John Conner.

The Lincoln Land Company, recognizing the potential of the site, surveyed and platted the town site of Gretna in 1887. The village was incorporated by July 10, 1889. The name suggests Scotland's Gretna Green, the place of origin of some of the earliest settlers.

== Geography ==
According to the United States Census Bureau, the city has a total area of 7.049 square miles (18.26 km^{2}), of which 6.951 square miles (18.00 km^{2}) is land and 0.097 square miles (0.25 km^{2}) is water.

== Demographics ==
Historical population
Census	Pop.	Note	%±
1890	255		—
1900	466		82.7%
1910	484		3.9%
1920	491		1.4%
1930	477		−2.9%
1940	482		1.0%
1950	438		−9.1%
1960	745		70.1%
1970	1,557		109.0%
1980	1,609		3.3%
1990	2,249		39.8%
2000	2,355		4.7%
2010	4,441		88.6%
2020	5,083		14.5%
2023 (est.)	9,054		78.1%
U.S. Decennial Census; 2020 Census

=== 2020 census ===
As of the 2020 census, Gretna had a population of 5,083. The median age was 36.9 years. 28.6% of residents were under the age of 18 and 15.1% of residents were 65 years of age or older. For every 100 females there were 92.6 males, and for every 100 females age 18 and over there were 91.5 males age 18 and over.

100.0% of residents lived in urban areas, while 0.0% lived in rural areas.

There were 1,938 households in Gretna, of which 38.2% had children under the age of 18 living in them. Of all households, 51.8% were married-couple households, 15.7% were households with a male householder and no spouse or partner present, and 26.6% were households with a female householder and no spouse or partner present. About 27.4% of all households were made up of individuals and 14.2% had someone living alone who was 65 years of age or older. The average household size was 2.5 and the average family size was 3.2.

There were 2,008 housing units, of which 3.5% were vacant. The homeowner vacancy rate was 0.1% and the rental vacancy rate was 6.6%.

Racial composition as of the 2020 census
Race	Number	Percent
White	4,702	92.5%
Black or African American	27	0.5%
American Indian and Alaska Native	13	0.3%
Asian	24	0.5%
Native Hawaiian and Other Pacific Islander	3	0.1%
Some other race	52	1.0%
Two or more races	262	5.2%
Hispanic or Latino (of any race)	158	3.1%

=== Income and poverty ===
The 2016–2020 5-year American Community Survey estimates show that the median household income was $69,592 (with a margin of error of +/- $21,688) and the median family income $102,646 (+/- $14,567). Males had a median income of $55,159 (+/- $8,524) versus $39,627 (+/- $3,278) for females. The median income for those above 16 years old was $45,473 (+/- $7,973). Approximately, 6.7% of families and 6.5% of the population were below the poverty line, including 8.6% of those under the age of 18 and 12.5% of those ages 65 or over.

=== 2010 census ===
As of the 2010 census, there were 4,441 people, 1,594 households, and 1,139 families living in the city. The population density was 2,114.8 inhabitants per square mile (816.5/km^{2}). There were 1,671 housing units at an average density of 795.7 per square mile (307.2/km^{2}). The racial makeup of the city was 97.4% White, 0.6% African American, 0.1% Native American, 0.5% Asian, 0.3% from other races, and 1.1% from two or more races. Hispanic or Latino of any race were 1.6% of the population.

There were 1,594 households, of which 43.8% had children under the age of 18 living with them, 56.7% were married couples living together, 11.2% had a female householder with no husband present, 3.6% had a male householder with no wife present, and 28.5% were non-families. 24.5% of all households were made up of individuals, and 10.1% had someone living alone who was 65 years of age or older. The average household size was 2.72 and the average family size was 3.29.

The median age in the city was 34.5 years. 31.7% of residents were under the age of 18; 5.8% were between the ages of 18 and 24; 28.7% were from 25 to 44; 21.4% were from 45 to 64; and 12.4% were 65 years of age or older. The gender makeup of the city was 49.0% male and 51.0% female.

== Education ==
The city's education system dates back to 1898 with the construction of the first school building. The schoolhouse underwent renovations in 1908, and in 1936, when a gym was added. The Gretna Public Schools District was majorly consolidated in 1958 when it reached its present size of 70 square miles. Gretna Public Schools consists of eight elementary schools, three middle schools, and two high schools. Schools include:

- Aspen Creek Elementary
- Aspen Creek Middle School
- Cedar Hollow Elementary
- Falling Waters Elementary
- Gretna East High School
- Gretna Elementary
- Gretna High School
- Giles Creek Middle School
- Gretna Middle School
- Harvest Hills Elementary
- Palisades Elementary
- Squire John Thomas Elementary
- Whitetail Elementary

Gretna Public Schools has passed several bond issues to build new facilities. Gretna's school bonds have become the third-highest bond levy tax burden for property owners in the state. Gretna has a bond levy of 0.33456, with only Bennington and Elkhorn ranking higher, each with a bond levy of .34.

== Notable people ==
- Andy Janovich, professional football player
- Sarah Weber, professional Soccer player
- Zane Flores, College American football player

== See also ==
- List of municipalities in Nebraska
- Nebraska Crossing
