= Salem's Lot (disambiguation) =

'Salem's Lot is a 1975 novel by Stephen King.

Salem's Lot may also refer to one of its adaptations or locations:

- Salem's Lot (1979 miniseries)
- Salem's Lot (2004 miniseries)
- Salem's Lot (1995 radio drama)
- 'Salem's Lot (film), a 2024 feature film
  - 'Salem's Lot (soundtrack)
- The fictional town of Jerusalem's Lot, Maine

== See also ==
- A Return to Salem's Lot, a 1987 theatrical sequel to the 1979 miniseries
