= Natzler =

Natzler is a surname. Notable people with the surname include:

- Gertrud Natzler (1908–1971), Austrian-American ceramicist
- Grete Natzler (1906–1999), Austrian actress and operatic soprano
- Hertha Natzler (1911–1985), Austrian actress
- Otto Natzler (1908–2007), Austrian–born ceramicist
