= Barney McFadden (actor) =

American film, stage and television actor

- McFadden in Centennial, 1978
- Born: Bernard Joseph Eugene McFadden; November 22, 1946; New York, U.S.
- Died: March 9, 2006 (aged 59); Los Angeles, California, U.S.
- Occupations: Film, stage and television actor

Bernard Joseph Eugene McFadden (November 22, 1946 – March 9, 2006) was an American film, stage and television actor. He was best known for playing Andrew Norris in the American soap opera television series Guiding Light.

== Life and career ==
Ned Tebbets (McFadden) getting killed in his jail cell by vampire Kurt Barlow (Reggie Nalder) in the miniseries Salem's Lot (1979).

McFadden was born in New York, the son of Joseph McFadden. He attended college in Long Island, New York, majoring in philosophy. He began his stage career in the stage play Come Back Little Sheba at the Cincinnati Playhouse in the Park. He appeared in three drama plays at the Allenberry Playhouse, and studied at Sanford Meisner's Neighborhood Playhouse School of the Theatre. He appeared in the stage play Abelard and Heloise in Los Angeles, California, and in 1972, he worked in his brother's vineyard in Northern California. He then began his screen career in 1975, playing Andrew Norris in the CBS soap opera television series Guiding Light. In 1976, he appeared in the CBS crime drama television series Kojak.

Later in his career, McFadden guest-starred in television programs including The Rockford Files, Barnaby Jones, Dallas, Buck Rogers in the 25th Century, CHiPs, Police Woman, Centennial and Logan's Run. He played the recurring role of Rudy Lansing in the NBC soap opera television series The Yellow Rose, and the recurring role of Jack Hendricks in the ABC action adventure television series Spy Game. He also appeared in films such as Intersection, A Mother's Prayer and Crazed.

McFadden retired from acting in 1999, last appearing in the CBS legal drama television series JAG. Aside from acting, he worked as a general contractor.

== Death ==
McFadden died from a stroke on March 9, 2006, in Los Angeles, California, at the age of 59.
