= 'Salem's Lot (soundtrack) =

'Salem's Lot (Original Motion Picture Soundtrack)

Film score by Nathan Barr and Lisbeth Scott
- Released: October 4, 2024
- Recorded: 2022–2023
- Genre: Film score
- Length: 52:39
- Label: WaterTower Music
- Producers: Nathan Barr; Lisbeth Scott

Nathan Barr chronology
A Bit of Light (2024)	'Salem's Lot (2024)

Lisbeth Scott chronology
Gratitude Revealed (2024)	'Salem's Lot (2024)

'Salem's Lot (Original Motion Picture Soundtrack) is the film score to the 2024 supernatural horror film 'Salem's Lot directed by Gary Dauberman based on the 1975 novel by Stephen King. The film score is jointly composed by Nathan Barr and Lisbeth Scott and released through WaterTower Music on October 4, 2024.

== Development ==
In June 2022, it was announced that Nathan Barr and Lisbeth Scott would compose the score for 'Salem's Lot. The duo discussed on a traditional, thematic horror score which served as a throwback to 1970s horror films over a modern and subversive approach. Barr utilized a Wurlitzer theatre pipe organ featuring 1,366 pipes to create unsettling sounds by manipulating air pressure and flow directly into the pipes, which was rarely utilized by traditional organ owners and players. The machinery of the instrument was used to create a motor-like sound serving as a consistent texture to the highly intense scene.

A specific motif for Mark was recorded using Fena, a toy piano originated in Spain from the 1950s, and an old instrument such as Scarab was used to enhance the unsettling atmosphere of the basement scenes. Scott also provided eerie vocals which served as the motif for the townspeople who were influenced by the vampire master Bario. Some of their compositions had been influenced by the editing, such as the main title sequence being composed much late due to the editing process, and the subsequent editing to the mortuary scene, led the composers to repurpose and rewrite music to match the pacing of the film.

== Release ==
The soundtrack was released through WaterTower Music on October 4, 2024.

== Reception ==
S.J. of After Misery wrote "Composers Lisbeth Scott and Nathan Barr's score also understands the assignment as their music growls like a bloodthirsty animal with its rumbling bass and devilish vocals to invoke a great level of dread and urgency". Hugh Verheylewegen of Pixelated Geek wrote "The score by composers Nathan Barr and Lisbeth Scott is excellent as it helps elevate the film’s tension alongside the visuals". Lovia Gyarkye of The Hollywood Reporter and Peter Debruge of Variety called the score "eerie" and "unsettling". V. L. Jones of Morbidly Beautiful wrote "the haunting music score by Nathan Barr and Lisbeth Scott, makes this film even more hair-raising than the 1979 version."

== Track listing ==
No.	Title	Length
1.	"Main Title Theme (from 'Salem's Lot)"	2:32
2.	"Mike Is Dead"	3:30
3.	"Town Theme"	0:33
4.	"Tree House Attack"	3:55
5.	"Barlow and Straker"	2:31
6.	"Mark's Game Plan"	4:14
7.	"The Mortuary"	5:22
8.	"Flashback"	1:23
9.	"Ralphie's Abduction"	2:46
10.	"Blood Waltz"	1:31
11.	"Search Party"	1:40
12.	"The Funeral"	3:59
13.	"Barlow on the Hunt"	4:10
14.	"The Town Is Dead"	2:46
15.	"Find Barlow"	4:03
16.	"The Drive-In"	4:55
17.	"Ben's Theme"	2:49
Total length:		52:39

== Additional music ==
The following songs are not included in the soundtrack:

- "Sundown" – Gordon Lightfoot
- "Hurdy Gurdy Man" – Donovan
- "Clap for the Wolfman" – The Guess Who (Burton Cummings)
- "Can't Live Without You Girl" – Bill Hurd
- "Ain't No Harm" – Jim Turner
- "Just Another Day" – Mike Shepstone and Peter Dibbens
- "Vienna Blood Waltz, Op. 354" – Johann Strauss II

== Accolades ==
Award	Date of ceremony	Category	Recipient(s) and nominee(s)	Result	Ref.
Motion Picture Sound Editors	February 23, 2025	Outstanding Achievement in Music Editing – Broadcast Long Form	Andrew Silver (supervising music editor), John Carbonara and Lightchild (music editor)	Nominated	
