= Father Callahan =

- The Dark Tower character
- Father Callahan from Wolves of the Calla. Art by Bernie Wrightson.
- First appearance: 'Salem's Lot
- Last appearance: The Dark Tower VII: The Dark Tower
- Created by: Stephen King
- Portrayed by: James Gallery (1979); Nigel Anthony (1995); James Cromwell (2004); John Benjamin Hickey (2024)

In-universe information
- Species: Human
- Gender: Male
- Occupation: Priest
- Nationality: American

Father Donald Frank Callahan is a fictional character created by Stephen King. He originally appeared in the 1975 novel 'Salem's Lot and later The Dark Tower, appearing in The Dark Tower V: Wolves of the Calla, The Dark Tower VI: Song of Susannah and finally The Dark Tower. He is at first an alcoholic with a troubled faith, but he seems to find his peace in The Dark Tower novels, and his faith is restored.

== History ==
=== 'Salem's Lot ===
Father Callahan is the local Roman Catholic priest of the small Maine town of Jerusalem's Lot. An alcoholic, Callahan presides over the funeral of Danny Glick, a young boy who was, unbeknownst to the townsfolk, killed by the vampire Kurt Barlow. Life appears to go on as normal, but more and more of the populace are turned into vampires by Barlow and the new vampires he creates. Local writer Ben Mears, schoolteacher Matt Burke and a young boy named Mark Petrie discover what is happening. Joined by doctor Jimmy Cody and Susan Norton, they convince Callahan of the vampire presence and enlist him to help.

Callahan leads a daytime assault on the old house that is Barlow's hiding place, only to find that the vampire has vacated the premises in anticipation of their attack. However, the group uses the opportunity to destroy the vampiric Susan, whom Barlow had turned during an unsuccessful attempt by her and Mark Petrie's to invade the house and destroy Barlow, and purify the house against future vampire occupation.

That night, Callahan encounters Barlow himself when the latter invades the Petrie family's home and kills Mark's parents in retaliation for Mark killing Barlow's trusted human familiar. Barlow then seizes Mark and challenges Callahan to drop the cross he is using to hold him at bay and face him "faith to faith". Callahan initially refuses, not trusting Barlow to release Mark, but Barlow ups the ante by releasing the boy, who flees. Now confronted with the choice, Callahan's faith fails, with the cross consequently becoming useless against Barlow. Barlow then seizes him, cuts open a vein in his own throat and forces the priest to drink his blood, damning him. Defeated, Callahan returns to his church, but burns his hand on the door and is refused entrance. Callahan leaves the town on a bus, bemoaning how "unclean" he has become.

=== Wolves of the Calla ===
After fleeing 'Salem's Lot, Callahan arrives in New York City, and becomes a vagrant. Now able to sense vampires, he realizes that they live and hunt all around him. His alcoholism gets worse but after he starts working at a homeless shelter, he begins to recover. He befriends several people, such as Rowan Magruder and Lupe Delgado. Callahan develops a deep fondness for Lupe, and later admits to having fallen in love with him. He wonders if this means he is gay, but despite a brief kiss on the cheek, nothing physical occurs between them.

Callahan learns that there are three types of vampires. The Type Ones are the most powerful and are almost immortal. They can spread vampirism to others and create Type Two vampires. Kurt Barlow was a Type One. Type Twos are more common and can create other Type Twos or Type Threes. Lastly, the Type Threes cannot spread vampirism but can spread diseases that travel by blood, such as HIV. Callahan refers to them as "mosquitoes". After Lupe is infected by a Type Three vampire and dies from AIDS, Callahan begins to kill vampires (mostly Type Threes). This attracts the attention of the Crimson King and his soldiers, the Low Men or "can-toi". The Hitler Brothers, two hoodlums who murder Jews, black people and homosexuals and carve swastikas on their victim's foreheads, are hired to find Callahan. They torture Rowan Magruder, who later dies of his wounds, in hopes of finding him.

They later find and attack Callahan, and carve a cross on his forehead, intending it to become a swastika. But before they can finish the swastika, Callahan is rescued by Calvin Tower and Aaron Deepneau, two men who figure prominently later in Roland's quest. The Hitler Brothers flee, and are later killed by the Low Men. Callahan is later lured into a building by Richard Sayre, a Low Man, and several vampires. Rather than be infected, he jumps out a window committing suicide.

After his death, he wakes up in the Way Station, where he encounters Walter o'Dim who gives him Black Thirteen, one of the "Bends" in the Wizard's Rainbow. Walter apparently does so in the hopes that it will kill Roland Deschain later in his journey. It transports him to the Doorway Cave outside Calla Bryn Sturgis, where he leads a new life and over the next five years attempts to teach the locals his religion.

Roughly every 23 years, the Callas are raided by wolves, which turn out to be robotic soldiers serving the Crimson King. These Wolves steal half of the Calla's children, who return a few months later "roont". "Roont" (ruined) children are sterile, mentally handicapped, grow to be larger and stronger than other children, and die painfully at a younger age. When Roland and his ka-tet arrive, Callahan seeks their help to defeat the Wolves. During their stay, he shares with them his story since the events of 'Salem's Lot. The Wolves are defeated with the help of the ka-tet, but Susannah becomes possessed by the demon succubus known as Mia and escapes via the Doorway Cave. There, Callahan discovers a copy of the novel 'Salem's Lot, in which he is a major character, causing him to question his reality.

=== Song of Susannah ===
Immediately after the events of the previous book, the ka-tet regroups in Callahan's house, where they lay down their plans of action; Roland and Eddie would follow Susannah to New York while Jake and Callahan would be sent to Maine in 1977, intending to visit Calvin Tower (the man who saved Callahan from the Hitler Brothers) as well as Stephen King, in order to ensure that the latter will finish writing the chronicle of the Dark Tower. Callahan plans to question King about his existence, but something goes wrong when the door is opened. The group is uncontrollably sucked through and separated, with Roland and Eddie ending up in Maine and Jake, Callahan, and Oy thrown to New York City in 1999.

The trio lands violently in the middle of a busy street, and Oy is very nearly run down by a speeding cab. Preventing a potentially deadly response from an angry Jake, Callahan beats down the aggressive driver and bribes him (before Jake had the opportunity to shoot him), and they remove themselves from the scene.

Thanks to Jake's psychic connection with Susannah, they find the hotel where Susannah/Mia left Black Thirteen. They attempt to remove it safely, but it awakens and forces them both to their knees, urging them to murder each other. They nearly succumb to the suicidal whisperings, but Callahan uses his restored faith to silence the orb, putting it back into its slumber and saving their lives.

Callahan and Jake place Black Thirteen to a long-term storage locker underneath the World Trade Center, buying enough time to store it until 2002. Their hope is that either it will remain dormant or that Roland will arrive at some point to destroy it. As they depart, they comment on how Black Thirteen might be destroyed if the buildings collapsed on top of it, foreshadowing that the future terrorist attack will either shatter or forever bury the artifact.

They go to the Dixie Pig, the restaurant stronghold of the Low Men and vampires where Susannah is being held, where they prepare to ambush the unknown forces within.

=== The Dark Tower ===
Father Callahan from The Dark Tower. Art by Michael Whelan.

Jake and Callahan burst into the Dixie Pig, where they are greeted by a preponderance of Low Men and lesser vampires, as well as a gathering of "Type One" vampires (of which there are only a small number in existence).

Seeing the overwhelming odds against them, Callahan sends Jake on ahead to rescue Susannah while he draws their attention. After dispatching several Low Men and Type Ones, he is goaded to toss away both his cross and the sigil of the turtle (the magical ornament that incapacitates the Low Men). At this point, Callahan realizes what he did not understand while facing Barlow in 'Salem's Lot: the power of his faith transcends such objects.

Eventually, once Jake has reached relative safety, Callahan is overwhelmed and swarmed by the vampires. Before the beasts can assault him, he once again escapes their clutches by shooting himself under the chin. Before taking his own life, he converses briefly with Roland, who bears witness to the scene across time and space. His final words to Roland and in life were a benediction to the Gunslinger: "May you find your Tower, Roland, and breach it,...and may you climb to the top!"

Jake in particular was disturbed by his death, and the ka-tet mourned the loss of their friend and compatriot. When Roland finally made it to the Dark Tower, Callahan's is one of the names shouted by Roland as he walks through the field of roses, showing Roland's respect and love for the redeemed priest.

== Other versions ==
=== Deleted scene ===
The original draft of 'Salem's Lot originally depicted a different fate for Callahan. Rather than forced to drink Barlow's blood and leaving town damned, he marks the vampire with a knife before committing suicide. Furious, the vampire desecrates the priest's body, decapitating it and hanging it upside down. This scene was changed by King before he originally published the story, though it was included in a section of deleted scenes featured in the deluxe limited edition released by Centipede Press in 2005 and the later trade edition.

=== 1979 miniseries ===
In the 1979 miniseries adaptation of 'Salem's Lot, Father Callahan is featured only as a minor character. He is played by James Gallery. Callahan is first briefly seen officiating at the funeral of Danny Glick. Later, Ben Mears and Susan Norton have a brief interview with him where they try to convince him to join them against the evil in the town. Callahan is skeptical and makes a brief comment on how the Church's view of evil has changed. Soon afterwards, Callahan is at the Petrie house to talk to Mark and his parents about Mark's nocturnal experiences. Abruptly, with a surge of electricity and a tremor, the vampire Barlow enters, kills the Petrie parents, seizes Mark and challenges Callahan. The exchange, although shortened, is much the same as in the original novel, only with Straker, now also present, interpreting for the monstrous and inarticulate Barlow. Barlow lets Mark go in order to confront Callahan, who falteringly hold on to his crucifix while facing the vampire. Barlow plucks the Crucifix from the priest's hand, and Callahan is not seen again, presumably killed.

=== 1995 radio drama ===
In the BBC radio-dramatization of the 'Salem's Lot novel, Callahan was voiced and played by Nigel Anthony.

=== 2004 miniseries ===
James Cromwell as Father Callahan.

In the 2004 Salem's Lot miniseries, Father Callahan was portrayed by James Cromwell. The beginning of the miniseries shows an event taking place after most of the story; Ben Mears enters a homeless shelter in a big city and sees Callahan giving out food. Mears confronts Callahan and chases him up some stairs where they struggle. Callahan shoots Mears, but Mears pushes himself and Callahan out a window and the two of them land on a police car. The rest of the film is told in flashback as Ben explains to a hospital orderly why he attacked Callahan.

Callahan is generally portrayed as in the novel, but after Barlow forces him to drink his blood, Callahan does not leave town in shame. Instead, Barlow makes him visit Matt Burke in the hospital and murder him.

As Ben Mears tells his story to the orderly, Callahan is suffocated with a pillow by Mark Petrie in the hospital.

The framing story of Callahan now living in a big city, working in a homeless shelter and his being pushed out of an upper storey window are clearly inspired by the events in the Dark Tower: Wolves of the Calla novel, though the miniseries does not use any of the further material featuring Callahan from the other Dark Tower books, which feature his return and redemption.

=== 2024 film ===
In the 'Salem's Lot film, released on Max on October 3, Father Callahan is played by veteran actor John Benjamin Hickey. Early in the movie Callahan is shown to be a heavy drinker who wakes up in the town jail. He admits to having a crisis of faith, but he still shows faith in humanity, telling Constable Gillespie that evil thrives when good people do nothing to stop it. Later, before Danny Glick's funeral, he shares a drink from a flask with gravedigger Mike Ryerson. When Mears, Susan, and Dr. Cody come to his church and tell him about Barlow and the townspeople who have been turned into vampires, he is initially skeptical. But when Mark Petrie arrives looking for holy water, telling his own story of the undead and that he was forced to kill Richard Straker, Callahan agrees to help. The group goes to the Marsten House looking for Straker's body, and to find out what happened to Matt Burke. Straker's body is missing, but the group ends up in the basement and is attacked by a turned Burke. After Mears destroys Burke, the group separates but agrees to meet at the church by sundown. Father Callahan goes with Mark to his home to warn his parents about the threat, but Barlow arrives and kills Mark's parents. Callahan tells Mark to flee as he holds Barlow at bay with his crucifix. After Mark gets away, Barlow challenges Callahan's resolve, and his faith fails, making the crucifix useless. Barlow then kills him after a brief struggle. His body is later found in the Petrie home by Mears, Dr. Cody, and Mark.
