= Jordan Preston Carter =

American actor

- Born: July 31, 2008 (age 18); United States
- Occupation: Actor
- Years active: 2016–present

Jordan Preston Carter (born July 31, 2008) is an American actor. He is best known for playing Quincy Jr. in the crime drama series The Haves and the Have Nots and Mark Petrie in the horror film 'Salems's Lot.

== Early life ==
Carter was born in the U. S. on July 31 2008. He developed an interested in storytelling at a young age and loved to read and imagine different characters. He has said that his mother is his main influence on his career.

== Career ==
His first big role came playing Quincy Jr in the crime series The Haves and the Have Nots. His next recurring role came in the drama miniseries DMZ starring Rosario Dawson. His biggest movie role so far has been playing Mark Petrie in the horror film 'Salems's Lot starring Lewis Pullman.

== Filmography ==
=== Film ===
Year	Title	Role	Notes
2016	Untitled	Young David Pines	Short
2019	Shaft	5-8 year old JJ	
2019	The Last Full Measure	Jeremy	
2020	The Violent Heart	Young Daniel	
2022	Sons 2 the Grave	Bailey	
2024	'Salem's Lot	Mark Petrie	

=== Television ===
Year	Title	Role	Notes
2016	Power	Child#1	Episode: "Stealing Fire"
2017	Uncle Joey	Boy	
2015–2021	The Haves and the Have Nots	Quincy Jr	57 episodes
2022	DMZ	Odi Peerlis	4 episodes
2022	Ms. Marvel	Gabe	Episode: "Destined"
2022	Kindred	Cyrus	Episode: "Furniture"
2023	Princess Power	Kiwi Boy	Episode: "The Princess and the Bees"
