= The Scotland Yard Mystery =

1934 film directed by Thomas Bentley

- Directed by: Thomas Bentley
- Screenplay by: Frank Miller
- Based on: The Scotland Yard Mystery by Wallace Geoffrey
- Produced by: Walter C. Mycroft
- Starring: Gerald du Maurier; George Curzon; Grete Natzler; Belle Chrystall
- Cinematography: James Wilson
- Edited by: Walter Stokvis
- Production company: British International Pictures
- Distributed by: Wardour Films
- Release date: 3 January 1934
- Running time: 76 minutes
- Country: United Kingdom
- Language: English

The Scotland Yard Mystery (released in the US as The Living Dead) is a 1934 British crime film directed by Thomas Bentley and starring Sir Gerald du Maurier, George Curzon, Grete Natzler, Belle Chrystall and Wally Patch. The screenplay concerns a criminal doctor who operates a racket claiming life insurance by injecting victims with a life suspending serum turning them into living dead. The film is based on a play by Wallace Geoffrey. It was made by one of the biggest British companies of the era, British International Pictures, at their Welwyn Studios.

== Plot summary ==
The board of directors of the World Insurance Company observe that five heavily insured policy holders have all died within the first year of taking out their insurance. One, Doctor Freeman, had certified them all as being in good health, and he is called before the board to explain this strange coincidence.

Dr. Freeman is engaged to Mary Stanton, daughter of Chief Inspector Stanton. She induces her father to take an interest in the case to save her fiancé's reputation and professional standing. When another heavily insured person suddenly dies, the Inspector becomes convinced a criminal mind is behind these deaths.

The deceased policy holders are exhumed, and, instead of bodies, the coffins are found to be full of old books. Stanton gets on the trail of Dr. Floyd, who has certified that one of the men died of heart failure, but Floyd has mysteriously disappeared.

An absorbing interest is taken in the case by Dr. Masters, the chief pathologist. However, Stanton begins to believe him implicated when an important witness is poisoned in his very office by a drink that Masters himself administered.

Masters' home is watched, but he outwits the police by kidnapping Stanton's daughter, Mary. When Stanton and Freeman enter Masters' laboratory they find Mary there, deceased. Masters then begins to relate the story of his discovery of a serum that produces complete catalepsy, so complete that any doctor would certify the victim as having died of heart failure. He alone possesses the anti-toxin. He has used his great discovery to defraud the insurance company, splitting the spoils with the "deceased" who, upon their "resurrection," have gone abroad with their share of ill-gotten gains.

To Stanton and Freeman's insistent demands that he restore Mary to life, Masters answers that he will if the Inspector allows him and his wife to escape to Europe. However, the Inspector won't compromise his position, and he wins the secret of the anti-toxin from Irene Masters by pretending to torture her husband.

In the excitement of bringing Mary back to the world of the living, the Masters make their escape, taking a plane headed for Europe. But the police radio calls the plane back, and Masters gives himself the serum hoping to deceive the police.

When the plane lands, gunfire ensues, and the only bottle left of the anti-toxin, which Masters entrusted to Irene Masters, is smashed by a bullet. Masters ultimately meets the fate he had planned for others and joins the "Living Dead."

== Cast ==
- Sir Gerald du Maurier as Commissioner Stanton
- George Curzon as Doctor Charles Masters
- Grete Natzler as Irene Masters
- Belle Chrystall as Mary Stanton
- Leslie Perrins as John Freeman
- Frederick Peisley as Kenneth Bailey
- Wally Patch (billed as Walter Patch) as Detective Sergeant George
- Henry Victor as Floyd
- Herbert Cameron as Paxton
- Paul Graetz as Paston

== Bibliography ==
- Low, Rachael. Filmmaking in 1930s Britain. George Allen & Unwin, 1985.
- Wood, Linda. British Films, 1927-1939. British Film Institute, 1986.
