= Reggie Nalder =

Austrian actor (1907–1991)

- Born: Alfred Reginald Natzler; 4 September 1907; Vienna, Austria-Hungary
- Died: 19 November 1991 (aged 84); Santa Monica, California
- Occupation: Actor
- Years active: 1940s–1990s

Reggie Nalder (born Alfred Natzler; 4 September 1907 – 19 November 1991) was a prolific Austrian film and television character actor from the late 1940s to the early 1990s. His distinctive features—partially the result of disfiguring burns—together with a haunting style and demeanor led to his being called "The Face That Launched a Thousand Trips".

== Life and career ==
Born in Vienna, Austria-Hungary, he was the son of actor and operetta singer Sigmund Natzler. He was a cousin of actresses and singers Grete Natzler and Hertha Natzler. As a young man he performed at second-rate Vienna theatres and from the 1930s in several cabarets in Paris. After World War II he worked for the German language service of the BBC.

Nalder is perhaps best remembered for his roles as an assassin in Alfred Hitchcock's 1956 remake of The Man Who Knew Too Much, the vampire Kurt Barlow in the 1979 television adaptation of the Stephen King novel Salem's Lot, and the Andorian ambassador Shras in the Star Trek episode "Journey to Babel".

Nalder appeared, at the request of star Frank Sinatra, in a brief, uncredited role as a communist spymaster named Dmitri in John Frankenheimer's 1962 film The Manchurian Candidate. He also had a brief role in the 1981 Walt Disney film The Devil and Max Devlin but later stated in an interview that he could not stand working with its star Bill Cosby, who he described as "a pig", as well as "rude, arrogant, and very untalented."

Nalder's television work also included episodes of the series 77 Sunset Strip, It Takes a Thief, Surfside Six, Boris Karloff's Thriller ("The Terror in Teakwood" and "The Return of Andrew Bentley"), McCloud and I Spy. Nalder was also credited as "Detlef Van Berg" in the X rated films Dracula Sucks (1978) and Blue Ice (1985), but performed in no scenes of a pornographic nature.

== Death ==
Nalder died of bone cancer in Santa Monica, California in 1991, aged 84.

== Partial filmography ==
- Roxy and the Wonderteam (1938) - Fußballer
- Jericho (1946)
- La colère des dieux (1947)
- Dilemma of Two Angels (1948) - Bébé
- Le signal rouge (1949)
- Adventures of Captain Fabian (1951) - Constant
- Bluebeard (1951) - Captain of the guard
- Betrayed (1954) - (uncredited)
- The Lovers of Lisbon (1955) - Le maître d'hôtel / Hotel Manager (uncredited)
- Les évadés (1955) - Le gardien avec le chien / Guard with dog (uncredited)
- The Man Who Knew Too Much (1956) - Rien
- Liane, Jungle Goddess (1956) - Viktor Schöninck
- Not Delivered (1958) - Dédé
- Romarei, das Mädchen mit den grünen Augen (1958) - Sekretär Dewitz
- The Spiral Road (1962) - Burubi
- Convicts 4 (1962) - Greer
- The Manchurian Candidate (1962) - Gomel (uncredited)
- The Day and the Hour (1963) - Le gestapiste
- Les saintes-nitouches (1963)
- Mark of the Devil (1970) - Albino
- The Bird with the Crystal Plumage (1970) - Needles, Yellow Jacket Assassin (uncredited)
- Mark of the Devil Part II (1973) - Natas
- The Dead Don't Die (1975) - Perdido
- Fellini's Casanova (1976) - Faulkircher
- Crash! (1977) - Man at swap meet
- Zoltan, Hound of Dracula (1977) - Veidt Smith
- Battlestar Galactica (miniseries pilot/theatrical release & episode "Saga of a Star World") (1978) - bartender
- Dracula Sucks (a.k.a. Lust at First Bite) (1978) - Dr. Van Helsing
- Seven (1979) - Ronald Kahala 'The Hermit'
- Salem's Lot (1979) - Kurt Barlow
- The Devil and Max Devlin (1981) - Chairman of Devil's Council
- Blue Ice (1985) - Anton Stuttgart
- Jericho (1991) - German conqueror (final film role)
