= Salem's Lot (1979 miniseries) =

1979 television miniseries

- Promotional poster
- Genre: Horror; Fantasy
- Based on: 'Salem's Lot by Stephen King
- Screenplay by: Paul Monash
- Directed by: Tobe Hooper
- Starring: David Soul; James Mason; Lance Kerwin; Bonnie Bedelia; Lew Ayres
- Music by: Harry Sukman
- Country of origin: United States
- Original language: English
- No. of episodes: 2

Production
- Executive producer: Stirling Silliphant
- Producer: Richard Kobritz
- Production locations: Ferndale, California, U.S. Warner Bros. Studios, Burbank, California, U.S.
- Cinematography: Jules Brenner
- Editor: Carroll Sax
- Running time: 191 minutes
- Production company: Warner Bros. Television
- Budget: US$4 million

Original release
- Network: CBS
- Release: November 17 – November 24, 1979

Related
- A Return to Salem's Lot; Salem's Lot (2004); Chapelwaite; Salem's Lot (2024)

Salem's Lot (also known as Salem's Lot: The Movie, Salem's Lot: The Miniseries and Blood Thirst) is a 1979 American horror television miniseries directed by Tobe Hooper, and adapted by Paul Monash from the 1975 novel 'Salem's Lot by Stephen King. It stars David Soul, James Mason, Lance Kerwin, Bonnie Bedelia and Lew Ayres. The plot concerns a writer who returns to his hometown and discovers that its citizens are turning into vampires.

After Warner Bros. acquired the rights to Salem's Lot, several filmmakers developed screenplays but none proved satisfactory. Producer Richard Kobritz decided that, due to the novel's length, Salem's Lot would work better as a television miniseries than as a feature film. He and screenwriter Monash followed the general outline of King's novel but changed some elements, including turning the head vampire Kurt Barlow from a cultured human-looking villain into a speechless demonic-looking monster. With a budget of $4 million, principal photography began on July 10, 1979, in Ferndale, California.

Salem's Lot first aired in two feature-length installments on CBS in November 1979, and received positive reviews, earning three nominations at the 32nd Primetime Emmy Awards. In the years following its broadcast, it has accumulated a cult following and has had a significant impact on the vampire genre. It was followed by a 1987 theatrical sequel, A Return to Salem's Lot, directed by Larry Cohen.

== Plot ==
At a church in Guatemala, a man and a boy, Ben Mears and Mark Petrie, are filling small bottles with holy water. When one of the bottles begins to emit an eerie supernatural glow, Mears tells Mark that "they've found us again." Knowing an evil presence is nearby, they decide to stay to fight it.

Two years earlier, Mears, a successful author, returns after a long absence to his small hometown of Salem's Lot, Maine. Mears intends to write a book about the Marsten House, an old, ominous property on a hilltop which has a reputation for being haunted. Attempting to rent it, Mears finds that it has already been purchased by another new arrival in town, the mysterious Richard Straker, who is in the process of opening an antique shop with his oft-mentioned but never present business partner, Kurt Barlow. Instead, Mears moves into a boarding house in town run by Eva Miller and develops a romantic relationship with a local woman, Susan Norton. He befriends Susan's father, Dr. Bill Norton, and reconnects with his kindly former school teacher, Jason Burke. Mears tells Burke that he feels the Marsten House is somehow inherently evil, recalling that its original owner, Hubie Marsten—implied to have been a child molester—died of suicide there. Mears further recalls a traumatic childhood incident in which he broke into the house on a dare and saw Hubie's ghost.

After a large crate is delivered to the Marsten House one night, townspeople begin to disappear or die under strange circumstances. Mears and Straker are the main suspects as they are both new in town, but it eventually becomes clear that the crate contained Straker's business partner, Kurt Barlow—an ancient vampire who has come to Salem's Lot after sending his servant Straker to prepare for his arrival. Straker kidnaps a young boy, Ralphie Glick, as an offering to Barlow, while Barlow himself causes local realtor Larry Crockett to die of fright when he appears. Ralphie Glick returns as a vampire to claim his brother, Danny. After his funeral, the undead Danny infects a gravedigger, Mike Ryerson, and attempts to prey on one of his schoolfriends, Mark Petrie. However, Mark is a horror film buff and manages to repel Danny with a cross.

As the vampirism spreads, Mears, Burke, and Dr. Norton gradually realize what is happening to the town and attempt to stop it. Burke, however, suffers a severe heart attack following an encounter with the newly vampirized Ryerson. Mark's parents are both killed by Barlow, though Mark escapes with the assistance of a local priest. Mears is attacked by Ralph and Danny's presumed-dead mother Marjorie Glick after she revives on a mortician's table, but Mears defends himself using a makeshift cross.

Seeking revenge for his parents' deaths, Mark breaks into the Marsten House, and a concerned Susan follows him inside; both are soon captured by Straker. Later, Mears and Dr. Norton enter the house, too, where Straker kills Norton by impaling him on a pair of antlers before he himself is fatally shot by Mears. Afterwards, Mears and the freed Mark find Barlow's coffin in the cellar and destroy him by driving a stake through his heart. Fleeing the other vampires in the house (the infected townsfolk), the two set fire to the Marsten property as they leave, though Susan is nowhere to be found. While the house burns, the wind carries the fire towards the town itself. As he and Mark drive away from Salem's Lot, Mears comments that the fire will drive all the vampires from their hiding places and purify the town from the evil that has engulfed it.

The story returns to Mears and Mark at the church in Guatemala two years later. It becomes clear that they are on the run from the surviving Salem's Lot vampires, and that their bottles of holy water glow whenever a vampire is nearby. Realizing that they have been tracked down yet again, Mears and Mark return to their lodgings to collect their belongings. Once there, Mears finds Susan lying in his bed. Now a vampire, she prepares to bite him as he leans down to kiss her, but instead Mears drives a stake through her heart and destroys her. A grief-stricken Mears then leaves with Mark, knowing that the vampires will continue to pursue them.

== Cast ==
- David Soul as Ben Mears
- James Mason as Richard Straker
- Lance Kerwin as Mark Petrie
- Bonnie Bedelia as Susan Norton
- Lew Ayres as Jason Burke
- Ed Flanders as Bill Norton
- Fred Willard as Larry Crockett
- Julie Cobb as Bonnie Sawyer
- Kenneth McMillan as Constable Parkins Gillespie
- Geoffrey Lewis as Mike Ryerson
- Barney McFadden as Ned Tebbets
- Marie Windsor as Eva Miller
- Bonnie Bartlett as Ann Norton
- George Dzundza as Cully Sawyer
- Elisha Cook Jr. as Gordon "Weasel" Phillips
- Clarissa Kaye as Marjorie Glick
- Ned Wilson as Henry Glick
- Barbara Babcock as June Petrie
- Joshua Bryant as Ted Petrie
- James Gallery as Father Callahan
- Reggie Nalder as Kurt Barlow
- Brad Savage as Danny Glick
- Ronnie Scribner as Ralphie Glick

== Production ==
=== Development ===
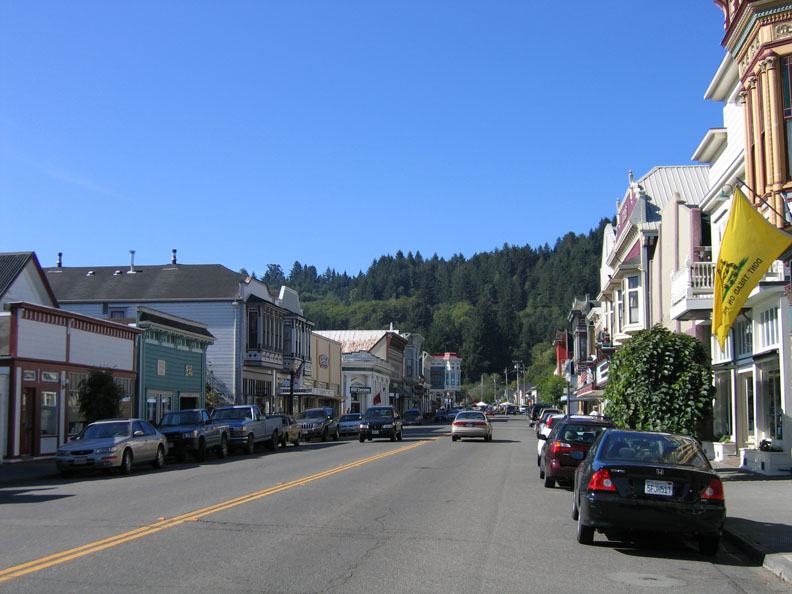
The town of Ferndale in Northern California was chosen to represent Salem's Lot for the miniseries.

After Warner Bros. acquired the rights to 'Salem's Lot, the studio sought to turn the 400+page novel by Stephen King into a feature film, while still remaining faithful to the source material. Producer Stirling Silliphant, screenwriter Robert Getchell, and writer/director Larry Cohen all contributed screenplays but none proved satisfactory. "It was a mess," King said. "Every director in Hollywood who's ever been involved with horror wanted to do it, but nobody could come up with a script."

Eventually, the project was turned over to Warner Bros. Television and producer Richard Kobritz. The latter decided that, due to the novel's length, Salem's Lot would work better as a television miniseries than as a feature film. Television writer Paul Monash was contracted to write the teleplay. Monash was familiar with writing about small towns, and he previously produced the film adaptation of King's novel Carrie and had worked on the television series Peyton Place. Finally, a screening of The Texas Chain Saw Massacre (1974) resulted in Kobritz selecting Tobe Hooper as director.

With a budget of $4 million, principal photography began on July 10, 1979, in the Northern California town of Ferndale, with some scenes filmed at studios in Burbank, California. Filming officially wrapped on August 29, 1979.

=== Adaptation from source material ===
Although the miniseries follows the general outline of King's novel, there are a few substantial deviations for creative or logistical reasons. Many characters have been combined or merely deleted, as have certain subplots, and the character of Barlow is vastly different in the miniseries from how he is in the novel. However, Stephen King praised Paul Monash's screenplay and stated "Monash has succeeded in combining the characters a lot, and it works."

Producer Richard Kobritz, who took a strong creative interest in his films, added several changes to Monash's script, including turning the head vampire Kurt Barlow from a cultured human-looking villain into a speechless demonic-looking monster. Kobritz explained:

We went back to the old German Nosferatu concept where he is the essence of evil, and not anything romantic or smarmy, or, you know, the rouge-cheeked, widow-peaked Dracula. I wanted nothing suave or sexual, because I just didn't think it'd work; we've seen too much of it. The other thing we did with the character which I think is an improvement is that Barlow does not speak. When he's killed at the end, he obviously emits sounds, but it's not even a full line of dialogue, in contrast to the book and the first draft of the screenplay. I just thought it would be suicidal on our part to have a vampire that talks. What kind of voice do you put behind a vampire? You can't do Bela Lugosi, or you're going to get a laugh. You can't do Regan in The Exorcist, or you're going to get something that's unintelligible, and besides, you've been there before. That's why I think the James Mason role of Straker became more important."

Other changes by Kobritz included having the final confrontation with Barlow in the cellar of the Marsten House whereas in the book it is in the basement of Eva Miller's boarding house, a concept Kobritz felt "Just doesn't work. I mean, from a point of sheer construction in a well-written screenplay, he's got to reside in the inside of the Marsten House. He's a major star in the picture – the third or fourth most important character – he's got to be there. It may have worked in the book, but not in the movie." Susan's death was also moved to the climax, to give her death "more impact and provide the film with a snap ending."

=== Casting ===
For the roles of Richard K. Straker and the vampire Kurt Barlow, James Mason and Reggie Nalder had been on producer Richard Kobritz's "wish list". Kobritz sent Mason a copy of the script, which he loved. Mason’s wife, Clarissa Kaye-Mason, was cast as Marjorie Glick. Nalder was less impressed. "The makeup and contact lenses were painful but I got used to them. I liked the money best of all."

The miniseries also features Elisha Cook Jr. as Weasel Philips and Marie Windsor as Eva Miller, two characters in a relationship. This casting was an inside joke by producer Kobritz, a fan of Stanley Kubrick; Cook and Windsor previously played a couple in Kubrick's The Killing (1956).

=== Direction ===
Salem's Lot does not rely on the same kind of dynamics as The Texas Chain Saw Massacre. "This film is very spooky – it suggests things and always has the overtone of the grave. It affects you differently than my other horror films. It's more soft-shelled," director Tobe Hooper explains. "A television movie does not have blood or violence. It has atmosphere which creates something you cannot escape – the reminder that our time is limited and all the accoutrements that go with it, such as the visuals."

Although Salem's Lot was aimed at television, a European theatrical release was also planned which would include more violence. For example, two versions of the scene where Cully Sawyer threatens Larry Crockett with a shotgun were filmed. In one version, Larry holds the gun barrel in his mouth, while in the other, the barrel is in front of his face. "They worked at a feature film pace instead of a TV pace," recalled actor Lance Kerwin on the filming. "It's really even hard to tell the flow of the film. It was a miniseries originally, then we shot a feature film version for Europe at the same time. They've edited and cut together so much."

=== Design and effects ===
A full-scale mock-up of the Marsten House was built over a smaller house.

Unable to find a house in Ferndale that resembled the Marsten House from the book, an estimated $100,000 was spent on constructing a three-story facade over an existing house on a hillside, overlooking Ferndale and the Eel River Valley. Designed by Mort Rabinowitz, it took 20 days to build. Another $70,000 was spent on constructing the interior set of the house which proved even more difficult for designer Rabinowitz, who also designed the building of Straker's antique shop and the small village in Guatemala where the beginning and end of the miniseries is set.

The vampire makeup involving glowing contact lenses was invented by Jack Young. According to Tobe Hooper, the makeup on actor Reggie Nalder would constantly fall off, as well as the fake nails and dentures, and the contact lenses would go sideways. The contact lenses could only be worn for 15 minutes at a time before they had to be removed to let the eyes rest for 30 minutes.

The vampire levitations were accomplished by placing the actors on a boom crane instead of traditional wires: "We didn't fly our vampires in on wires, because even in the best of films you can see them," producer Richard Korbitz explained. "We wanted to get a feeling of floating. And the effect is horrific, because you know there are no wires. It has a very spooky, eerie quality to it." The levitation sequences were also shot-in-reverse [sic] to make the scenes more eerie.

== Soundtrack ==
With producer Richard Kobritz wanting "a good, atmospheric, old-fashioned, Bernie Herrmann-type score", the film score was composed and conducted by Harry Sukman, whom Korbitz described as "a former cohort and protege of Victor Young". The soundtrack to Salem's Lot is known to be Sukman's last work before passing in 1984. Waxwork Records released the soundtrack in 2016 on vinyl record for the first time.

== Release ==
Salem's Lot was telecast in the United States in two installments on CBS, the first airing on November 17, 1979, and the second on November 24, 1979.

An alternate truncated cut running 110 minutes was distributed internationally as a theatrical feature.

== Reception ==
=== Critical response ===
Broadcast reviews for Salem's Lot were largely positive, with critics praising the miniseries's atmosphere, cinematography, Hooper's direction, and scares. Time Out called the film "surprisingly successful", highlighting the film's cinematography, atmosphere, and climax. Helen O'Hara of Empire awarded the film three out of five stars, stating that, although it "doesn’t quite nail the scale of the infection", the film's scares, special effects, pacing, and characters more than made up for it.

As of April 2026, it holds an approval rating of 87% on Rotten Tomatoes, based on 23 reviews. The site's critical consensus reads: "Director Tobe Hooper and a devilishly charismatic James Mason elevate this television adaptation of the Stephen King novel, injecting the vampiric tradition with fresh blood and lingering scares."

=== Awards and nominations ===
| Year | Award | Category | Nominee | Result |
|---|---|---|---|---|
| 1980 | Edgar Award | Best Television Feature or Miniseries | Paul Monash | Nominated |
| 1980 | Primetime Emmy Awards | Outstanding Achievement in Graphic Design and Title Sequences | Gene Kraft | Nominated |
| 1980 | Primetime Emmy Awards | Outstanding Achievement in Makeup | Ben Lane and Jack H. Young | Nominated |
| 1980 | Primetime Emmy Awards | Outstanding Achievement in Music Composition for a Limited Series or a Special (Dramatic Underscore) | Harry Sukman | Nominated |

== Legacy ==
In the years following its initial broadcast, Salem's Lot has accumulated a cult following and is now considered a classic. It has been included in multiple lists by several media outlets. Paste ranked the film at #52 on its list of "100 Best Vampire Movies of All Time". Variety listed it at #20 on its "Best and Worst Stephen King Adaptations" in 2017.

=== Influence ===
Salem's Lot had a significant impact on the vampire genre, as it inspired horror films such as Fright Night (1985) and the scenes of vampire boys floating outside windows were referenced in The Lost Boys (1987) and later spoofed in The Simpsons episode "Treehouse of Horror IV". Salem's Lot has been cited as one of the primary influences for Joss Whedon's hit TV series Buffy the Vampire Slayer.

Writer Bryan Fuller stated that the scene where a character is impaled on a deer's antlers in Salem's Lot inspired him to do a similar scene in his 2013 TV series Hannibal because the original scene frightened him so much as a child.

Filmmaker Mike Flanagan's 2021 horror limited series Midnight Mass is inspired by both the novel and the miniseries. Like Salem's Lot, Midnight Mass centers around a small town where a former local returns after an extended period of time. The arrival of a strange new resident (in King's story, Straker, in Flanagan's series the substitute priest), and the revelation of the town being infected by vampires. The master vampire in Mass is modeled somewhat on the miniseries version, and also never speaks. The vampires' eyes are also lifted from the miniseries.

=== Sequels and remakes ===
In 1987, Larry Cohen directed A Return to Salem's Lot, a sequel to the 1979 miniseries.

In 2004, TNT premiered a new version of Salem's Lot starring Rob Lowe, which received a Primetime Emmy nomination for its music.

On April 23, 2019, New Line Cinema announced that a theatrical film based on the novel would be made, with Gary Dauberman and James Wan producing. Dauberman wrote the screenplay for It and It Chapter Two. Dauberman was confirmed as director on April 10, 2020. The film was released on Max in October 2024.

== See also ==
- Vampire film
- List of vampire television series

== Sources ==
- Muir, John Kenneth (2002). Eaten Alive at a Chainsaw Massacre: The Films of Tobe Hooper. Jefferson, North Carolina: McFarland & Company. ISBN 978-0-786-41282-2.
