= John Benjamin Hickey =

American actor (born 1963)

- Hickey in 2026
- Born: June 25, 1963 (age 63); Plano, Texas, U.S.
- Education: Texas State University, San Marcos; Fordham University (BA); Juilliard School (GrDip)
- Occupation: Actor
- Years active: 1990–present
- Partner: Jeffrey Richman (2003–present)

John Benjamin Hickey (born June 25, 1963) is an American actor and director with a career in stage, film and television. He won the 2011 Tony Award for Best Performance by a Featured Actor in a Play for his performance as Felix Turner in The Normal Heart.

== Early life ==
Hickey was born in Plano, Texas, and graduated from Plano Sr. High School in 1981. He attended Texas State University - San Marcos from 1981 to 1983, where he was active in the theater department. He earned his bachelor's degree in English at Fordham University in 1985.

== Career ==
On Broadway, he originated the role of Arthur in Terrence McNally's play Love! Valour! Compassion! in 1995, a role he recreated for the 1997 film version.

He played supporting roles in a number of films including The Ice Storm (1997) and The Anniversary Party (2001). He has also appeared in Flightplan, Flags of Our Fathers, Freedom Writers, Then She Found Me, Transformers: Revenge of the Fallen, The Bet and Life with Judy Garland: Me and My Shadows.

He played Clifford Bradshaw in the 1998 Broadway revival of Cabaret, which won the Tony for Best Revival of a Musical. In that same year, he played the lead in the independent film Finding North.

On Broadway, he played Reverend John Hale in the 2002 revival of Arthur Miller's The Crucible.

Hickey played American novelist and playwright Jack Dunphy in the 2006 Truman Capote biographical film Infamous. Hickey played Philip Stoddard on the short-lived gay-themed sitcom It's All Relative. Since It's All Relative, Hickey has appeared on Alias, Law & Order, Brothers & Sisters, Stacked, Heartland, In Plain Sight, Law & Order: Los Angeles, and Modern Family.

He appeared in the 2011 Broadway revival of The Normal Heart, for which he won the Tony Award for Best Featured Actor in a Play. He was in the Broadway revival of Mary Stuart in 2009, as the Earl of Leicester.

From 2010 to 2013, he appeared on The Big C and was nominated for a Primetime Emmy Award for Outstanding Supporting Actor in a Miniseries or a Movie for the final season of the series, subtitled Hereafter. Hickey starred as scientist Frank Winter on the TV series Manhattan, which concluded on December 15, 2015, after two seasons and 23 episodes.

In 2015, he appeared Off-Broadway at the Mitzi Newhouse Theatre in the play Dada Woof Papa Hot by Peter Parnell.

In 2018, he appeared in the world premiere of Matthew Lopez's play The Inheritance, inspired by E.M. Forster's novel Howards End, creating the role Henry Wilcox at London's Young Vic and then transferring to the West End.

On September 30, 2021, Hickey was cast as Father Callahan in the adaptation of Stephen King's 'Salem's Lot for Warner Bros. Pictures and New Line Cinema.

He directed the 2022 Broadway revival of the Neil Simon play Plaza Suite starring Sarah Jessica Parker and Matthew Broderick, which had originally been slated to begin previews in March 2020 and was postponed due to the COVID-19 pandemic. The production transferred to the West End and played a limited engagement at the Savoy Theatre from January to April 2024.

== Personal life ==
Hickey is gay. Since 2003 his partner has been screenwriter and television producer Jeffrey Richman.

== Filmography ==
=== Film ===
Source: TCM; AllMovie

Year	Title	Role	Notes
1994	The Ref	Old Baybrook Policeman	
1994	Only You	Dwayne	
1995	Comfortably Numb	Priest	
1996	Eddie	Joe Nader	
1997	Love! Valour! Compassion!	Arthur Pape	
1997	The Ice Storm	Mark Boland	
1998	Finding North	Travis Furlong	
1999	The General's Daughter	Captain Goodson	
1999	The Bone Collector	Dr. Barry Lehman	
2001	The Anniversary Party	Jerry Adams	
2002	Changing Lanes	Carlyle	
2005	Flightplan	David	
2006	Infamous	Jack Dunphy	
2006	Flags of Our Fathers	Keyes Beech	
2006	The Ex	Wesley's dad	
2007	Freedom Writers	Brian Gelford	
2007	Then She Found Me	Alan	
2007	The Seeker: The Dark Is Rising	John Stanton	
2009	The Taking of Pelham 123	Deputy Mayor LaSalle	
2009	Transformers: Revenge of the Fallen	Theodore Galloway	
2012	Pitch Perfect	Dr. Mitchell	
2014	Get On Up	Richard	
2014	Big Stone Gap	Theodore Tipton	
2014	My Eleventh	—N/a	
2015	Truth	Mark Wrolstad	
2016	Tallulah	Stephen Mooney	
2016	Barry	Professor Gray	
2017	Hostiles	Captain Royce Tolan	
2018	Forever My Girl	Pastor Brian Page	
2018	Mapplethorpe	Sam Wagstaff	
2020	Sublet	Michael	
2024	'Salem's Lot	Father Callahan	
2024	Lilly	Charles Ledbetter	

=== Television ===
Year	Title	Role	Notes
1990	The Days and Nights of Molly Dodd	Trent	Episode: "Here's a Quick and Easy Recipe for Leftovers"
1994	NYPD Blue	Paul Gaines	Episode: "Good Time Charlie"
1994	Normandy: The Great Crusade	Louis Simpson (voice)	Television film
1995	New York News	—N/a	Episode: "You Thought the Pope Was Something"
1997	Nothing Sacred	Dr. Elliott	Episode: "Speaking in Tongues"
1998	Law & Order	Charles Thatcher	Episode: "Castoff"
1998	3rd Rock from the Sun	Rick	Episode: "The Greatest Dickdater"
1998	Sex and the City	Tom	Episode: "Oh Come All Ye Faithful"
1999	Homicide: Life on the Street	Dennis Kohler	Episode: "Zen and Art of Murder"
1999	The Lady in Question	Paul Kessler	Television film
2000	Perfect Murder, Perfect Town	—N/a	Miniseries
2000	D.C.	Various	4 episodes
2000	Hamlet	Horatio	Television film
2000	Law & Order: Special Victims Unit	Mark Hickey	2 episodes
2001	A Glimpse of Hell	—N/a	Television film
2001	Life with Judy Garland: Me and My Shadows	Roger Edens	2 episodes
2001	CSI: Crime Scene Investigation	Dr. Sidney Cornfeld	Episode: "Slaves of Las Vegas"
2001	The Guardian	The Hudson's Attorney	Episode: "Loyalties"
2001	NYPD Blue	Phillip Connor	Episode: "Mom's Away"
2002	Hack	Dr. Martin Shane	Episode: "Obsession"
2002–2006	Law & Order	Aaron Solomon	4 episodes
2003	Law & Order: Criminal Intent	Randall Fuller	Episode: "Con-Text"
2003–2004	It's All Relative	Philip Stoddard	22 episodes
2005	Alias	Father Kampinski	Episode: "In Dreams..."
2005	Silver Bells	Lawrence	Television film
2006	Justice	Lloyd Barrett	Episode: "Wrongful Death"
2006	Brothers & Sisters	Major Guinness	Episode: "Light the Lights"
2006	Stacked	Headmaster Keenan	Episode: "The Headmaster"
2006	A House Divided	President Russell	Television film
2006–2007	Undercover History	Narrator	6 episodes
2007	The Hunt for the Boston Strangler	Narrator	Television film
2007	Heartland	Bill	Episode: "Pilot"
2007	Situation Critical	US Narrator	13 episodes
2007	Secrets of the Moon Landings	Narrator	Television film
2008	The Real George Washington	Narrator	Television film
2008	In Plain Sight	Donald Fraser / Donald Ferguson	Episode: "Don of the Dead"
2008	Living Proof	Blake Rogers	Television film
2009	Timewatch	Narrator	Episode: "The Real Bonnie and Clyde"
2009	Lincoln: American Mastermind	Narrator	Television film
2010	Past Life	Sid	Episode: "Running on Empty"
2010	Law & Order: LA	Thomas Nelson	Episode: "Pasadena"
2010–2013	The Big C	Sean Tolkey	40 episodes
2011	A Gifted Man	Ben Tucker	Episode: "In Case of Exposure"
2011–2016	The Good Wife	Neil Gross	8 episodes
2012–2013	The Mob Doctor	Mark Easton	3 episodes
2012–2013	The New Normal	Father Michael	3 episodes
2013	Hannibal	Dr. Sutcliffe	Episode: "Buffet Froid"
2014	Modern Family	Dr. Clark	Episode: "Under Pressure"
2014	Law & Order: Special Victims Unit	Tom Moore	Episode: "Wednesday's Child"
2014–2015	Manhattan	Frank Winter	22 episodes
2015	Difficult People	Fred	Episode: "Pledge Week"
2017	The Good Fight	Neil Gross	2 episodes
2017	The Immortal Life of Henrietta Lacks	Bill Watson	Television film
2017	Mom	Dr. Sellers	Episode: "A Few Thongs and a Hawaiian Funeral"
2019	Jessica Jones	Peter Lyonne	3 episodes
2021	In Treatment	Colin	6 episodes
2021	HouseBroken	Various voices	9 episodes
2021	Gossip Girl	Roy Sachs	8 episodes
2025–2026	Daredevil: Born Again	Benjamin Hochberg	6 episodes
2026	The Terror: Devil in Silver	Dr. Walter	4 episodes

=== Theatre ===
Source: IBDB, IOBDB

Year	Title	Role	Notes
1992	The End of the Day	Jonathan Toffler/Young Graydon	Off-Broadway
1992	On the Bum	Oskar	Off-Broadway
1994–1995	Love! Valour! Compassion!	Arthur Pape	Off-Broadway
1995	Love! Valour! Compassion!	Arthur Pape	Broadway
1996	Blue Window	Griever	Off-Broadway
1997	God's Heart	David	Off-Broadway
1998–1999	Cabaret	Clifford Bradshaw	Broadway
2002	The Crucible	Reverend John Hale	Broadway
2009	Mary Stuart	Earl of Leicester	Broadway
2011	The Normal Heart	Felix Turner	Broadway
2015	Dada Woof Papa Hot	Alan	Off-Broadway
2017	Six Degrees of Separation	Flan Kittredge	Broadway
2018	The Inheritance	Henry Wilcox	Young Vic & West End
2019–2020	The Inheritance	Henry Wilcox	Broadway

== Awards and nominations ==
Year	Award	Category	Work	Result
2009	Outer Critics Circle Award	Outstanding Featured Actor in a Play	Mary Stuart	Nominated
2011	Tony Award	Best Performance by an Actor in a Featured Role in a Play	The Normal Heart	Won
2011	Drama Desk Award	Outstanding Ensemble Performance	The Normal Heart	Won
2013	Primetime Emmy Award	Outstanding Supporting Actor in a Miniseries or a Movie	The Big C: Hereafter	Nominated
2020	Tony Award	Best Performance by an Actor in a Featured Role in a Play	The Inheritance	Nominated
