= Hertha Natzler =

Austrian actress

- Born: February 18, 1911; Vienna, Austria-Hungary
- Died: August 5, 1985 (aged 74); Culver City, California], United States
- Burial place: Holy Cross Cemetery
- Other names: Herta Natzler
- Occupation: Actress
- Years active: 1928–1936
- Relatives: Grete Natzler

Hertha ('Hati') Natzler (1911–1985) was a stage and film actress in Austria active from 1928 until 1936.

== Origin in Austria ==
Hertha Natzler (also Herta Natzler) was born on February 18, 1911 in Vienna as the daughter of actor, opera singer and playwright Leopold Natzler and Emilie Franziska Theresia Rachel ('Emilia' or 'Lili') Meissner. Her father and mother were both actors, who were well known in Austria and Germany. Hertha was one of five sisters, two of whom died young. Her cousin was actor Reggie Nalder.

== On stage and in film in Vienna, 1928–1936 ==
Like her two surviving sisters, Grete Natzler and Alice Maria ('Lizzi') Natzler, Hertha started acting and singing on stage at a young age. She made her debut in Franz Lehár's operetta Der Tsarewitsch at the Johann Strauss Theatre in Vienna in May 1928. That year she also played a minor role in the revue Jetzt oder Nie, and in the play Weekend im Paradies, the 1928 rendition of the Wiener Kammerspiele Revue.

Hertha performed many such roles during 1928–1936 in play and operetta performances in different venues in Vienna, such as in several renditions of the Femina Revue. She also played minor roles in films produced in Vienna and Budapest: Peter (1934), Maskerade (1934), Nocturno (1934) and Leap into Bliss (1935). Nevertheless, Hertha was not as well known as her sisters Grete and Lizzi, and did not follow them to Germany to in pursuit of an international career.

== Leaving Austria for Hollywood and Cairo, 1937–1938 ==
The Natzler family was of Jewish origin. Following Hitler seizing absolute power in Germany in March 1933 and the start of anti-Semitic legislation, Grete and Lizzi were offered increasingly fewer roles in films and stage performances in Germany.

Grete had renounced her Jewish faith in 1930. She moved to the UK in 1934 and went to Hollywood on a one-year contract with Paramount in 1935. By 1937 she had achieved minor celebrity as a film star and singer, had taken the stage name Della Lind, and was better known to an American audience as 'MGM's exotic Viennese singing actress'.

Lizzi left Berlin to return to Vienna in 1933, but Austria experienced a similar political radicalization as Germany. Particularly during 1936–1937, which in 1938 resulted in Austria's Anschluss with Germany. Jewish people were increasingly barred from the positions they held in Austria's society. Lizzi's last film role was in Heut' ist der schönste Tag in meinem Leben, which was shot in 1935 and released in May 1936.

Hertha's last performance in Vienna was in the Femina Revue in March 1936. She was unemployed when she renounced her Jewish faith in April 1937. Together with Lizzi and her mother Lilly, Hertha left Austria and traveled to Rotterdam, from where they took the Dutch SS Statendam to New York in August 1937. Their destination was Hollywood and its film industry, where Grete was acting in several films, such as the Laurel and Hardy film Swiss Miss (1938). They arrived in October 1937. It appears that Hertha and Lizzi did not land any film roles in Hollywood.

== Marriage to Frank Leddy, 1938–1945 ==
Early in 1938, Hertha travelled to Cairo (Egypt), where she married Franciscus Nicolaas 'Frank' Leddy (1903–1964) on 11 April 1938. Leddy was managing director of Philips Orient SA, the local subsidiary of the international Philips Electronics company. Most likely she had met Leddy in Vienna, where Leddy had been a manager at the Vienna subsidiary of Philips until the company posted him to Cairo in 1938. They lived in the upmarket Zamalek district in Cairo.

Hertha and Leddy left Cairo early in 1942 to travel to Sydney (Australia), after the Philips Company had appointed Leddy Managing Director of its Australian subsidiary. They arrived in July 1942. To Hertha, Sydney may have been a backwater, compared to Vienna, Los Angeles and Cairo. It is likely that Leddy's busy work life, as well as Hertha missing her sisters and mother who had settled in Los Angeles, led to their separation and divorce in 1945.

== Los Angeles, 1945–1985 ==
Hertha left Australia in 1945 and seems to have settled with her sisters and mother in Los Angeles. Although Grete's film career was flagging, the career of her husband, Franz Steininger, took off. Steininger was the godson of Franz Lehár and worked in Hollywood as a film music composer and orchestra leader and conductor. Lizzi had married Manuel Tortosa, and became better known in Los Angeles as Litzie Maria Tortosa.

Although she did not resume her acting and singing career, Hertha remained in Los Angeles. She died on 5 August 1985.
