= 'Salem's Lot (film) =

2024 film by Gary Dauberman

- Promotional release poster
- Directed by: Gary Dauberman
- Screenplay by: Gary Dauberman
- Based on: 'Salem's Lot by Stephen King
- Produced by: James Wan; Michael Clear; Roy Lee; Mark Wolper
- Starring: Lewis Pullman; Makenzie Leigh; Alfre Woodard; John Benjamin Hickey; Bill Camp; Jordan Preston Carter; Nicholas Crovetti; Spencer Treat Clark; William Sadler; Pilou Asbæk
- Cinematography: Michael Burgess
- Edited by: Luke Ciarrocchi
- Music by: Nathan Barr; Lisbeth Scott
- Production companies: New Line Cinema; Atomic Monster; Vertigo Entertainment; Wolper Organization
- Distributed by: Warner Bros. Pictures
- Release dates: September 25, 2024 (Beyond Fest); October 3, 2024 (United States)
- Running time: 113 minutes
- Country: United States
- Language: English
- Box office: $851,156

'Salem's Lot is a 2024 American supernatural horror film written and directed by Gary Dauberman, based on the 1975 novel by Stephen King. The film stars Lewis Pullman, Makenzie Leigh, Alfre Woodard, John Benjamin Hickey, Bill Camp, Jordan Preston Carter, Nicholas Crovetti, Spencer Treat Clark, William Sadler, and Pilou Asbæk. It is the first feature film adaptation of the book, preceded by television miniseries versions from 1979 and from 2004. The plot centers on a writer who returns to his hometown of Jerusalem's Lot in search of inspiration, only to discover the presence of a vampire.

'Salem's Lot was announced in 2019 and shot in 2021, with additional photography in 2022. The film's release was delayed multiple times. The film had its world premiere as the opening film at the Beyond Fest on September 25, 2024, and was released on Max on October 3, 2024. The film received mixed reviews from critics.

== Plot ==
In 1975, author Ben Mears returns to his former hometown of Jerusalem's Lot looking for inspiration for a new book. He befriends and starts a romantic relationship with Susan Norton, a young woman who lives locally with her overbearing mother and who yearns to leave the small town. Meanwhile, 11-year-old Mark Petrie finds himself the target of a bully at his new school, and meets school teacher Matt Burke. A strange European man named Straker opens an antique store in town and moves into the long-abandoned Marsten House, which has a history of murders. Straker has a large crate (covertly containing a coffin and his vampire master, Kurt Barlow) shipped from overseas to Salem's Lot, where he has it placed in the basement of the house. Straker kidnaps one of Mark's school friends, Ralphie Glick, and offers him as a sacrifice to Barlow. An unseen creature attacks Ralphie's brother, Danny, who later dies, apparently from pernicious anemia. After his funeral, Danny emerges from his coffin, now a vampire, and bites gravedigger Mike.

Matt encounters a sickly Mike at a bar and invites him to stay the night before taking him to a doctor. Noticing a set of strange symptoms, Matt suspects that Mike is being turned into a vampire. After witnessing Danny fly into his house through a window, Matt flees and tells Ben and Susan. Along with Dr Cody and Sheriff Gillespie, the group examines Mike's now lifeless body although Matt does not tell Cody or Gillespie about what he saw. Later that night Mike returns, fully turned into a vampire, but Matt is able to ward him off with a cross. Meanwhile, Danny wakens Mark and gets him to let him into his house, but Mark resists and also fends off Danny with a cross. An avid horror buff, Mark researches how to kill vampires. The next day Dr Cody is informed that Danny and Ralphie's mother has been found dead from the same disease that killed her son. After discovering that Mike's body has also vanished, Cody finds an injured Matt and he tells her, Ben and Susan about the vampires and how to defeat them.

Mark and Matt break into the Marsten house to kill Barlow but are locked in the basement by Straker. Barlow bites Matt while Straker captures Mark. Meanwhile Ben, Susan and Dr Cody investigate Danny's mother's body at the morgue. To their horror, she rises and bites Dr Cody before being destroyed with a cross, but Dr Cody manages to stop herself from turning by injecting herself with a rabies shot. Barlow's vampires rapidly turn the town's residents. The next day, Mark escapes his bindings and kills Straker before fleeing the Marsten House. Seeking shelter at the church, Ben, Susan, and Dr. Cody consult the town's priest Father Callahan about what to do. Mark arrives informing them of what occurred at the Marsten house and about Barlow. They investigate the property and are attacked by Matt, now a vampire, in the basement. Ben kills him with a wooden stake. The town is completely overtaken by vampires. Sheriff Gillespie attempts to flee the town while Susan and Ben try to warn Susan's mother. Susan's mother reveals she has taken over Straker's role as Barlow's human servant and Susan is bitten by a vampire in their home. Ben flees with Susan.

Father Callahan attempts to convince Mark's parents of the danger but they are ambushed and killed by Barlow. Mark flees and takes shelter in his treehouse from his former classmates, all now turned into vampires. Ben takes Susan, who is in the process of becoming a vampire, to the church, which is holy ground protected from the vampires. Dr. Cody is unable to cure her and Susan fully turns and flees. Ben gives chase and is attacked by the town's vampire residents, before returning to the church to seek shelter with Cody. Gillespie's corpse is thrown into the church by the vampires. Mark searches for Barlow and breaks into Straker's antique store where he kills Danny. He is found by Ben and Dr. Cody and the group deduce the vampires are sheltering at the local drive-in movie theatre, using the cars as coffins. At the drive-in, dozens of cars are parked up. Ben finds Susan sleeping in the trunk of her car. As Dr. Cody prepares to kill Susan, Cody is shot dead by Susan's mother. The sun starts to set and the vampires awaken and attack Ben while remaining out of direct sunlight. Mark uses Ben's car to run over Susan's mother and then knocks down the supports to the cinema screen, thus exposing the vampires to direct sunlight and destroying them all. As the sun goes down, Barlow emerges from his coffin and attacks Mark as Susan attacks Ben. Ben kills Susan and manages to save Mark, killing Barlow with a stake. With the town's residents wiped out, Ben and Mark drive off.

== Cast ==
- Lewis Pullman as Ben Mears
- Makenzie Leigh as Susan Norton
- Alfre Woodard as Dr Cody
- John Benjamin Hickey as Father Callahan
- Bill Camp as Matt Burke
- Jordan Preston Carter as Mark Petrie
- Nicholas Crovetti as Danny Glick
- Spencer Treat Clark as Mike Ryerson
- William Sadler as Parkins Gillespie
- Pilou Asbæk as R. T. Straker
- Debra Christofferson as Ann Norton
- Alexander Ward as Kurt Barlow
- Cade Woodward as Ralphie Glick

== Production ==
'Salem's Lot is an adaptation of the 1975 novel by Stephen King. The feature film from New Line Cinema was announced in April 2019 when The Hollywood Reporter revealed Gary Dauberman was set to write the screenplay and executive produce and James Wan was attached as a producer. In an interview, Dauberman was asked if he would apply the same writing approach he used for It (2017) and It Chapter Two (2019), adaptations of King's novel It, to which he replied "I like to be as true to the story as I possibly can until it gets a little too unwieldy for a movie."

In April 2020, Dauberman closed a deal to become director. In August 2021, Lewis Pullman was selected to portray the film's lead role, while Makenzie Leigh, Bill Camp and Spencer Treat Clark were confirmed as well. In September 2021, it was confirmed that Pilou Asbæk, while Alfre Woodard, William Sadler and John Benjamin Hickey were added to the cast. In October 2021, child actors Jordan Preston Carter, Nicholas Crovetti and Cade Woodward were confirmed. In July 2022, it was confirmed that Alexander Ward would portray vampire Kurt Barlow.

On September 6, principal photography commenced in Boston with cinematographer Michael Burgess. Filming in the state of Massachusetts took place in Ipswich in Essex County and the towns of Sterling and Clinton in Worcester County. The Princeton Public Library in Princeton, Massachusetts, was booked as a filming location for three days. Filming also took place at Grace Episcopal Church in Medford, MA. Additional photography occurred in late May or early June 2022. During post-production, Nathan Barr and Lisbeth Scott composed the score for the film. According to Dauberman, the film was shortened from a duration of almost three hours, which would have included, among other things, the opening scene set in the Marsten House.

== Release ==
'Salem's Lot was originally set to be released in theaters on September 9, 2022, the post–Labor Day weekend that had been successful for the studio's past horror releases, but was delayed to April 21, 2023, "due to COVID-related delays in the post-production realm", before losing its release date to Evil Dead Rise.

There was growing concern that the project would be scrapped, despite being completely filmed and deep into post-production, similar to Batgirl, Scoob! Holiday Haunt and Coyote vs. Acme; the former two were cancelled on August 3, 2022, while the latter was cancelled on November 9, 2023, and saved on March 31, 2025, by Ketchup Entertainment. These films were ultimately treated as tax write-offs for the production company in the context of the Warner Bros. Discovery restructuring.

However, by October 2023, Warner Bros. Pictures was considering releasing the film on Max due to the 2023 SAG-AFTRA strike creating a "growing need for Max content", although a spokesperson stated no decision regarding the film's future distribution plans had been made yet. In February 2024, King questioned why there were still no confirmed release plans for the film, stating that he is "not sure why WB is holding it back; not like it's embarrassing, or anything. Who knows. I just write the fucking things." Dauberman believes that this escalation in King's speech contributed to the eventual finalization. In March, Warner Bros. confirmed that it would be released on Max, and in August, it was scheduled for an October 2024 launch.

Before broader accessibility, it was the opening film at Beyond Fest on September 25, 2024. The film was then released exclusively OTT on October 3, 2024. Releasing Salem's Lot in October, ahead of Nosferatu in December, and on Max instead of theaters, helped avoid competition between the two films, preventing a potential split in ticket sales and viewership.

The Film Distributors' Association reported that it would be theatrically released in the United Kingdom and Ireland on October 11, 2024. Residents of the UK do not have access to Max due to existing agreements inked between Warner Bros. and Sky ("the exclusive distributor of most HBO content" in the UK) that do not expire until late 2025.

== Reception ==
On the review aggregator website Rotten Tomatoes, 46% of 103 critics' reviews are positive, with an average rating of 5.3/10. The website's consensus reads: "An old-fashioned spookfest, this 'Salem's Lot won't be the definitive adaptation of Stephen King's famed vampire tale but it makes for a solid reintroduction to a new generation of audiences." Metacritic, which uses a weighted average, assigned the film a score of 47 out of 100, based on 20 critics, indicating "mixed or average" reviews.

Josh Korngut of Dread Central awarded the film 2 stars out of 5 and wrote, "Despite its occasional scares and striking style, this adaptation lacks any of the terror or emotional depth of its Stephen King source material." Bloody Disgusting's Meagan Navarro also gave the film 2/5 stars, noting, "it's an adaptation that feels heavily tampered with, gutting all story and character development solely in favor of vampire scares."

== See also ==
- 'Salem's Lot (soundtrack)
- List of adaptations of works by Stephen King
- List of vampire films
