= Grete Natzler =

Austrian actress (1906–1999)

- Natzler in 1935
- Born: 19 June 1906; Vienna, Austria-Hungary
- Died: 10 June 1999 (aged 92); Key West, Florida, U.S.
- Resting place: Holy Cross Cemetery, Culver City
- Other names: "Della Lind", "Ziegler"
- Occupations: actress and operatic soprano
- Years active: 1929–1938
- Known for: Swiss Miss (film)
- Relatives: Hertha Natzler

Grete Natzler (19 June 1906 – 10 June 1999) was an Austrian actress and [operatic soprano. Born in Vienna, she was the daughter of actress Lilli Meißner and actor and opera singer Leopold Natzler. Two of her younger sisters were also actors and singers. Her sister, Alice Maria ('Lizzi'), performed under the stage name of Litzie Helm, and Hertha Natzler performed under her own name. Grete began her career on the stage in her native country and in Germany as a performer in operettas. In the early 1930s she appeared in films in both Germany and England, including The Scotland Yard Mystery (1933) and in several film versions of German operettas. After moving to the United States in the late 1930s, she signed a contract with MGM and adopted the pseudonym Della Lind. She is perhaps best known for portraying the role of Anna Albert in the 1938 Laurel and Hardy film Swiss Miss.

Her cousin was actor Reggie Nalder.

== Selected filmography ==
- Father Radetzky (1929)
- Josef the Chaste (1930)
- Vienna, City of Song (1930)
- Dolly Gets Ahead (1930)
- The Stranger (1931)
- The Duke of Reichstadt (1931)
- A Night in Paradise (1932)
- Melody of Love (1932), with Richard Tauber
- Peter (1934)
- The Scotland Yard Mystery (1934), with Sir Gerald du Maurier
- The Student's Romance (1935)
- Swiss Miss (1938), with Laurel and Hardy
