= Salem's Lot (radio drama) =

1995 British audio drama

- CD release cover
- Genre: Drama; Horror
- Running time: 30 mins
- Country of origin: United Kingdom
- Language: English
- Home station: BBC Radio 4
- Written by: Gregory Evans
- Directed by: Adrian Bean
- Original release: 15 December 1994
- No. of episodes: 7

Salem's Lot is a 1994 BBC Radio 4 dramatization of Stephen King's 1975 novel 'Salem's Lot written by Gregory Evans. It combines the psychological thriller and the classic horror genres, making references to Bram Stoker's 1897 novel Dracula at several points and sometimes replicating its storyline.

== Plot summary ==
Ben Mears, a successful writer who grew up in the town of Jerusalem's Lot, Maine (known to locals as "Salem's Lot" or "The Lot"), has returned home following the death of his wife. Ben plans to write a book about the "Marsten House", an abandoned mansion that gave him nightmares after a traumatic (and possibly supernatural) childhood experience. Once in town, he meets local high school teacher Matt Burke and strikes up a romantic relationship with Susan Norton, a young college graduate.

Mears discovers that the Marsten house has been bought by Mr. Straker and Mr. Barlow, a pair of businessmen who are also new to the town, although only Straker has been seen. Their arrival coincides with the disappearance of a young boy, Ralphie Glick, and the suspicious death of his brother Danny. It then becomes clear that Barlow is a vampire, and is taking over the town with Straker's help. Ben, Matt, Susan, and a few other residents of the Lot try to prevent the vampires from spreading. In the end, Ben and young Mark Petrie succeed in neutralizing Straker and destroy the master vampire Barlow, but, lucky to escape with their lives, are forced to leave the town to the newly created vampires.

== Cast and crew ==
- Stuart Milligan as Ben Mears
- Teresa Gallagher as Susan Norton
- Danny Cannaba as Mark Petrie
- Doug Bradley as Kurt Barlow
- John Moffatt as Richard Straker
- Gavin Muir as Matt Burke
- Kerry Shale as Jimmy Cody
- Don Fellows as Parkins Gillespie
- Nigel Anthony as Father Callahan
- George Parsons as Nolly Gardner
- Lorelei King as June Petrie
- Vincent Marzello as Henry Petrie
- Music by Elizabeth Parker of the BBC Radiophonic Workshop
- Dramatised by Gregory Evans
- Directed by Adrian Bean

== Differences between the novel and radio adaptation ==
Although the story's overall structure remains similar, several lines have been consolidated and/or simplified, in keeping with the much-shortened radio format (seven 30-minute broadcasts).

- Ralphie Glick's role is reduced (from both 1975 novel and 1979 TV-film)
- Dud Rogers and the junkyard see only cursory mention (much of the Barlow/Dud Rogers dialogue having been re-scripted into the Barlow/Larry Crockett death scene)
- Danny Glick's rise from the grave (and Mike Ryerson's death) are now explicitly enabled/supervised by Barlow, who mesmerizes Ryerson and calls Danny forth
- Father Callahan and Dr. Cody become quick/willing vampire-hunters, with virtually no complaint or skepticism
- Mark Petrie uses shards of broken glass (rather than contortionist rope-tricks) to free himself from Straker's knots
- The entire narrative is framed by Ben Mears' confession to a Mexican priest (who periodically interrupts the retelling with specific questions)
