= 'Salem's Lot =

1975 novel by Stephen King

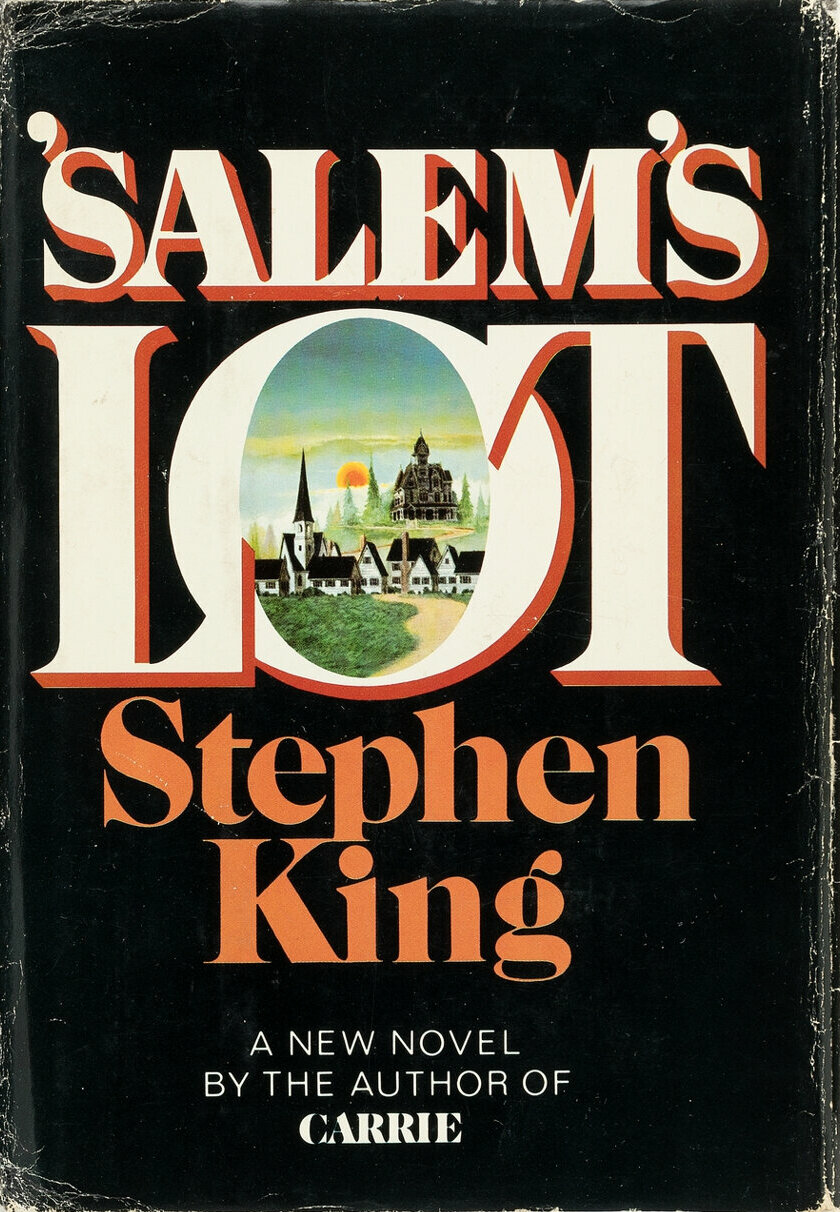
- First edition cover
- Author: Stephen King
- Cover artist: Dave Christensen
- Language: English
- Genre: Horror
- Published: October 17, 1975
- Publisher: Doubleday
- Publication place: U.S.
- Media type: Print (Hardcover)
- Pages: 439
- ISBN: 978-0-385-00751-1
- OCLC: 848489
- Dewey Decimal: 813.54
- LC Class: PS3561.I483

'Salem's Lot is a 1975 American horror novel by author Stephen King. It was his second published novel. The story involves a writer named Ben Mears who returns to the town of Jerusalem's Lot (or 'Salem's Lot for short) in Maine, where he lived from the age of five through nine, only to discover that the residents are becoming vampires.

The town is revisited in the short stories "Jerusalem's Lot" and "One for the Road", both from King's story collection Night Shift (1978). The novel was nominated for the World Fantasy Award in 1976 and the Locus Award for the All-Time Best Fantasy Novel in 1987.

In two interviews in the 1980s, King said that, of all his books, 'Salem's Lot was his favorite. In his June 1983 Playboy interview, the interviewer mentioned that because it was his favorite, King was planning a sequel, but King has said on his website that because The Dark Tower series already continued the narrative in Wolves of the Calla and Song of Susannah, he felt there was no longer a need for a sequel. In 1987, he told Phil Konstantin in The Highway Patrolman magazine: "In a way it is my favorite story, mostly because of what it says about small towns. They are kind of a dying organism right now. The story seems sort of down home to me. I have a special cold spot in my heart for it!"

'Salem's Lot was adapted into a 1979 two-part miniseries directed by Tobe Hooper and a 2004 television miniseries directed by Mikael Salomon. A feature film adaptation, written and directed by Gary Dauberman and starring Makenzie Leigh, Lewis Pullman, and Spencer Treat Clark, was released on Max on October 3, 2024.

== Plot ==
Ben Mears, a writer, has returned to Jerusalem's Lot, Maine, after 25 years to try to write his next novel. He quickly becomes friends with high school teacher Matt Burke and starts a romantic relationship with Susan Norton, a young college graduate who has ambitions to leave town. Ben has returned to "the Lot" to write a book about the long-abandoned Marsten House, where he had a bad childhood experience when he saw a hanging ghost. He learns that the house—the former home of Depression-era hitman Hubert "Hubie" Marsten—has been purchased by Kurt Barlow, ostensibly an Austrian immigrant who has arrived in the Lot to open an antique-furniture store. Barlow is supposedly on an extended buying trip; only his business partner, Richard Straker, is seen in public. The truth, however, is that Barlow is an ancient vampire and Straker is his human familiar.

The duo's arrival coincides with the disappearance of a young boy, Ralphie Glick, and the death of his 12-year-old brother, Danny, who becomes the town's first vampire turned by Barlow. Barlow also turns town-dump custodian Dud Rogers and telephone repairman Corey Bryant. Danny turns other locals into vampires, including the grave digger, Mike Ryerson, a newborn baby, Randy McDougall, a man named Jack Griffen, and Danny's mother, Marjorie. Danny fails to turn his classmate Mark Petrie, who resists him by holding a plastic cross in Danny's face. To fight the spread of the new vampires, Ben and Susan are joined by Matt Burke and his doctor, Jimmy Cody, along with Mark and the local priest, Father Callahan. Susan is captured by Barlow, who turns her. She is eventually staked through the heart by Ben.

When Father Callahan and Mark go to Mark's house to explain the danger his family is in, the electricity suddenly cuts off, and Barlow appears. After killing Mark's parents, Barlow takes the boy hostage. Callahan pulls out his cross to drive him off until Barlow challenges him to throw the cross away. Callahan, not having faith enough to do so, is soon overwhelmed by Barlow, who forces Callahan to drink his blood, making him "unclean". When Callahan tries to re-enter his church, he receives an electric shock, preventing him from going inside. Defeated, Callahan leaves Jerusalem's Lot.

Matt suffers a fatal heart attack, and Jimmy is killed when he falls from a rigged staircase and is impaled by knives set up by the vampires. Ben and Mark destroy Barlow, but they are lucky to escape with their lives and are forced to leave the town to the now leaderless vampires. Ben returns the following day to retrieve and bury the bodies of Mark's parents and Jimmy Cody in a clearing behind the Petrie residence.

The novel's prologue, set shortly after the end of the story proper, describes Ben and Mark's flight across the country to a seaside town in Mexico, where they attempt to recover from their ordeal. Mark is received into the Catholic Church by a friendly local priest and, for the first time, confesses what they have experienced.

An epilogue reveals the two return to the town a year later, intending to renew the battle. Knowing that there are too many hiding places for the vampires, Ben starts a brush fire in the nearby woods with the intention of destroying the town.

== Background ==
While teaching a course on fantasy and science fiction for students at Hampden Academy, King was inspired by Dracula, one of the books covered in the class. "One night over supper I wondered aloud what would happen if Dracula came back in the twentieth century, to America. 'He'd probably be run over by a yellow cab on Park Avenue and killed,' my wife said. That closed the discussion, but in the following days, my mind kept returning to the idea. It occurred to me that my wife was probably right – if the legendary Count came to New York, that is. But if he were to show up in a sleepy little country town, what then? I decided I wanted to find out, so I wrote 'Salem's Lot, which was originally titled Second Coming." (In the introduction to the 2004 audiobook recording that Stephen King read himself, he says it was he who said, "Probably he'd land in New York and be killed by a taxi cab, like Margaret Mitchell in Atlanta" and that it was his wife who suggested a rural setting for the book.) Though King initially planned to title the novel Second Coming, he changed it to Jerusalem's Lot on the advice of his wife, novelist Tabitha King, who thought the original title sounded too much like a "bad sex story". King's publishers then shortened it to the current title, thinking the author's choice sounded too religious. King's paperback publisher bought the book for $550,000.

King expands on this thought of the 20th-century vampire in his essay for Adeline Magazine, "On Becoming a Brand Name" (February 1980): "I began to turn the idea over in my mind, and it began to coalesce into a possible novel. I thought it would make a good one, if I could create a fictional town with enough prosaic reality about it to offset the comic-book menace of a bunch of vampires." Yet the inspirations for 'Salem's Lot go back even further. In Danse Macabre, a non-fiction overview of the modern horror genre, King recalls a dream he had when he was eight years old. In the dream, he saw the body of a hanged man dangling from the arm of a scaffold on a hill. "The corpse bore a sign: ROBERT BURNS. But when the wind caused the corpse to turn in the air, I saw that it was my face – rotted and picked by birds, but obviously mine. And then the corpse opened its eyes and looked at me. I woke up screaming, sure that a dead face would be leaning over me in the dark. Sixteen years later, I was able to use the dream as one of the central images in my novel 'Salem's Lot. I just changed the name of the corpse to Hubie Marsten."

King first wrote of Jerusalem's Lot in the short story "Jerusalem's Lot", penned in college but not published until years later in the short story collection Night Shift. In a 1969 installment of "The Garbage Truck", a column King wrote for the University of Maine at Orono's campus newspaper, King foreshadowed the coming of 'Salem's Lot by writing: "In the early 1800s a whole sect of Shakers, a rather strange, religious persuasion at best, disappeared from their village (Jeremiah's Lot) in Vermont. The town remains uninhabited to this day."

Politics during the time influenced King's writing of the story. The corruption in the government was a significant factor in the inspiration of the story. Of this he recalls,

I wrote 'Salem's Lot during the period when the Ervin committee was sitting. That was also the period when we first learned of the Ellsberg break-in, the White House tapes, the connection between Gordon Liddy and the CIA, the news of enemies lists, and other fearful intelligence. During the spring, summer and fall of 1973, it seemed that the Federal Government had been involved in so much subterfuge and so many covert operations that, like the bodies of the faceless wetbacks that Juan Corona was convicted of slaughtering in California, the horror would never end ... Every novel is to some extent an inadvertent psychological portrait of the novelist, and I think that the unspeakable obscenity in 'Salem's Lot has to do with my own disillusionment and consequent fear for the future. In a way, it is more closely related to Invasion of the Body Snatchers than it is to Dracula. The fear behind 'Salem's Lot seems to be that the Government has invaded everybody.

== Illustrated edition ==
Illustrated edition cover

In 2005, Centipede Press released a deluxe limited edition of 'Salem's Lot with black and white photographs by Jerry Uelsmann and the two short stories "Jerusalem's Lot" and "One for the Road", as well as over 50 pages of deleted material. The book was limited to 315 copies, each signed by Stephen King and Jerry Uelsmann. The book was printed on 100# Mohawk Superfine paper, measured 9 by 13 inches (23 cm × 33 cm), was over 4 1/4 in (11 cm) thick, and weighed more than 13 pounds (5.9 kg). The book included a ribbon marker, head and tail bands, three-piece cloth construction, and a slipcase. An unsigned hardcover edition limited to 600 copies was later released. Both the signed and unsigned editions sold out. In an interview with the printed trade journal Fine Books & Collections, King said of the illustrated folio version of his 'Salem's Lot, "I think it's beautiful!" A trade edition was later released.

== Reception ==
In the short story anthology A Century of Great Suspense Stories, editor Jeffery Deaver noted that King

singlehandedly made popular fiction grow up. While there were many good best-selling writers before him, King, more than anybody since John D. MacDonald, brought reality to genre novels. He's often remarked that Salem's Lot was Peyton Place meets Dracula, and so it was. The rich characterization, the careful and caring social eye, the interplay of story line and character development announced that writers could take worn themes such as vampires and make them fresh again.

Peter Straub recalls that "One day I wandered into a very good book store and saw Salem's Lot on the main table. If I had known that the book was about vampires, I might not have bought it. But I did buy it, and when I learned that one of the main characters was a vampire, it hit me like a ton of bricks. I thought, 'Oh my God, this guy is working with a very tired, almost exhausted, trope and he's making something really vibrant out of it.' So I became a huge Stephen King fan on the spot."

Neil Gaiman recalls that "My first encounter with Stephen King, long before I met him in the flesh, was on East Croydon station in about 1975. I was fourteen. I picked up a book with an all-black cover. It was called Salem's Lot... I stayed up late finishing Salem's Lot, loving the Dickensian portrait of a small American town destroyed by the arrival of a vampire. Not a nice vampire, a proper vampire. Dracula meets Peyton Place. After that I bought everything King wrote as it came out. Some books were great, and some weren't. It was okay. I trusted him."

== Adaptations ==
=== Film and television ===
In 1979, 'Salem's Lot was adapted as a three-hour two-part television miniseries of the same name that aired on CBS. It stars David Soul as Ben Mears, and was nominated for three Primetime Emmy Awards and an Edgar Award. It was filmed on location in Ferndale, California. A truncated two-hour version was also released in cinemas in some countries. In 1987, Larry Cohen directed the film A Return to Salem's Lot. Marketed as a sequel to the 1979 miniseries, the film does not include any of the original characters despite using the image of Barlow from the 1979 version on the poster. In 2004, TNT premiered a new television adaptation of 'Salem's Lot, also a three-hour, two-part miniseries, starring Rob Lowe as Ben Mears. It also received a Primetime Emmy nomination.

In 2018, the eighth episode of the Castle Rock TV series (centered around the fictional town created by King) entitled "Past Perfect" was aired, which briefly showed a present-day bus stop in Jerusalem's Lot. A traffic sign indicated that the town was located 24 miles away from Castle Rock. The Marsten House is a primary location in the show's second season.

The 2021 Epix television series Chapelwaite, starring Adrien Brody and Emily Hampshire, is loosely based on the short story "Jerusalem's Lot", a prequel to 'Salem's Lot set in the 19th century.

A theatrical film adaptation of 'Salem's Lot, from New Line Cinema, was announced in April 2019, with Gary Dauberman set to write and direct, and James Wan attached to produce. Filming began in Boston in September 2021. Lewis Pullman starred as Ben Mears, and Spencer Treat Clark and Makenzie Leigh costarred as Mike Ryerson and Susan Norton, respectively. The film was originally scheduled to be released in cinemas on September 9, 2022, but was pushed back to April 21, 2023, before being pulled from Warner Bros. release schedule indefinitely. The film premiered directly on Max on October 3, 2024.

=== Radio ===
The novel was adapted in the UK as a radio drama on BBC Radio 4 in 1994.

== See also ==
- 1975 in literature
- Ghost Story (Straub novel)
- Shiki
