= Makenzie Leigh =

American actress

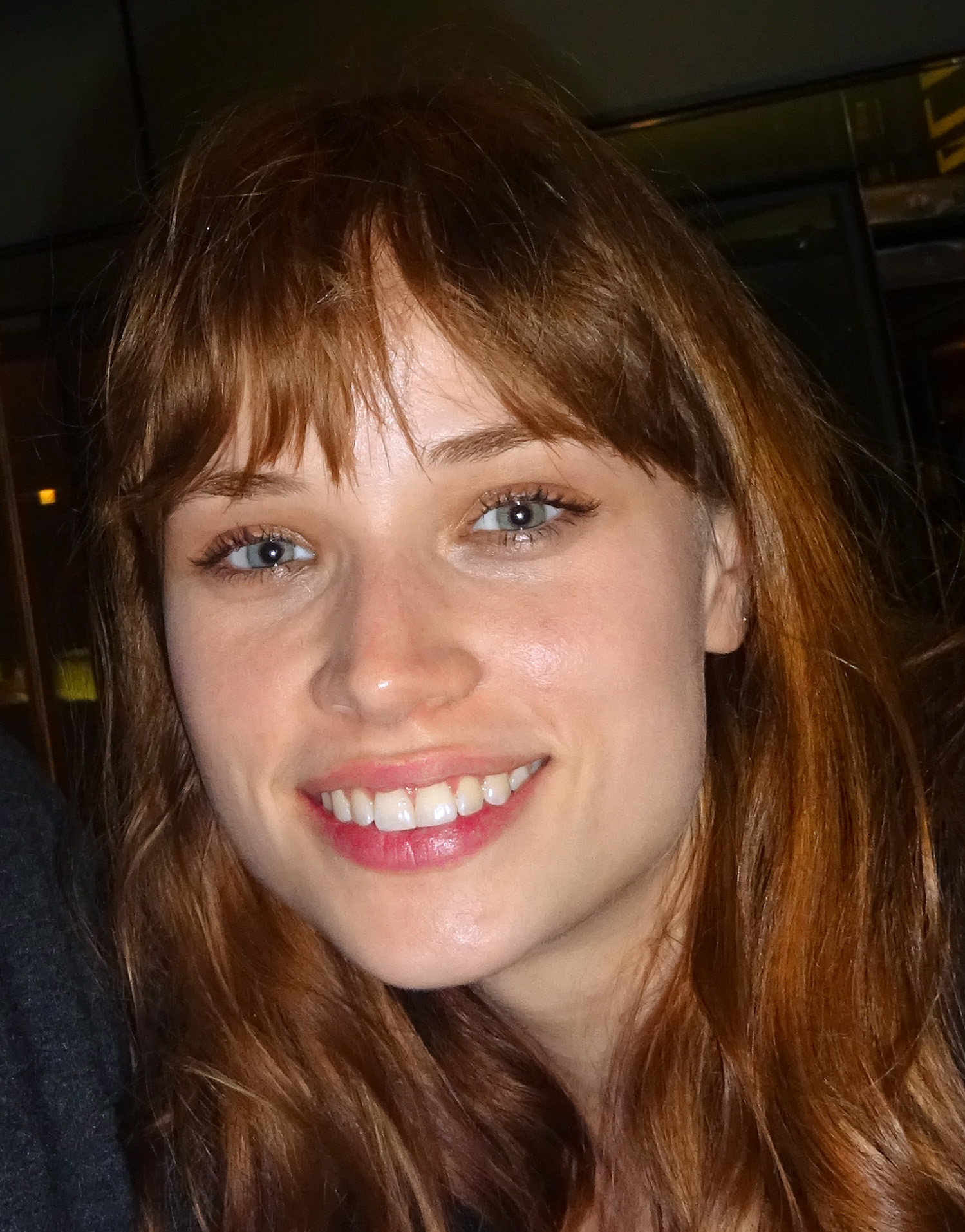
- Leigh in 2016
- Born: 1989 or 1990 (age 35–36); Texas, U.S.
- Occupations: Actress, director, producer, writer
- Years active: 2011–present
- Children: 1

Makenzie Leigh (born 1989 or 1990) is an American actress, noted for playing the protagonist's romantic interest Faison Zorn in Ang Lee's Billy Lynn's Long Halftime Walk (2016).

== Early life ==
Leigh is a native of Texas. When she graduated high school she moved to New York to dance ballet; she enrolled at New York University to study writing, then took an acting class to better understand characters, which ultimately led to her becoming an actress.

== Career ==
Leigh's first major role came as Liza in the first season of the Batman prequel television series Gotham (2014–2015). She was also featured in a regular role as the babysitter in the 2015 television miniseries The Slap, a remake of the Australian series of the same name.

Leigh played a supporting role opposite Christopher Abbott in the film James White (2015) and played a small part in the Amazon series Mozart in the Jungle.

Leigh had a prominent role as Dallas Cowboys Cheerleader Faison Zorn, Billy Lynn's romantic fixation, in the Ang Lee-directed film Billy Lynn's Long Halftime Walk (2016).

On August 30, 2021, it was announced that Leigh will appear as Susan Norton in an adaptation of Stephen King's 'Salem's Lot for Warner Bros. Pictures and New Line Cinema.

== Personal life ==
In October 2023, Leigh shared via an Instagram post that she and her boyfriend of five years got engaged. In December 2024, Leigh shared that she and her partner had their first baby.

== Filmography ==
=== Film ===
Year	Title	Role	Notes
2012	Girls Against Boys	Crying Girl	
2015	James White	Jayne	
2016	Billy Lynn's Long Halftime Walk	Faison Zorn	
2018	The Vanishing Princess	The Princess	Short film; also director, co-producer and writer
2019	The Assistant	Ruby	
2019	Light Years	Em	
2024	'Salem's Lot	Susan Norton	

=== Television ===
Year	Title	Role	Notes
2011	Law & Order: Special Victims Unit	Lana Mills	Episode: "Double Strands"
2013	Deception	Young Vivian	3 episodes
2013	The Good Wife	Rainey Selwin	Episode: "Rape: A Modern Perspective"
2013	Unforgettable	Celine Emminger	2 episodes
2014–2015	Gotham	Liza	Recurring role
2014	Mozart in the Jungle	Addison	2 episodes
2015	The Slap	Connie	Main cast
2015	The Knick	Amy O'Connor	2 episodes
2019	The Code	First Lieutenant Ella Stein	Episode: "Molly Marine"
