= Kurt Barlow =

- Reggie Nalder as Barlow, in Salem's Lot (1979)
- First appearance: 'Salem's Lot
- Last appearance: 'Salem's Lot
- Created by: Stephen King
- Portrayed by: Reggie Nalder (1979); Doug Bradley (1995); Rutger Hauer (2004); Alexander Ward (2024)

In-universe information
- Alias: Kurt Breichen
- Gender: Male
- Occupation: Antique dealer Master vampire

Kurt Barlow is a fictional vampire and the main antagonist of Stephen King's 1975 horror novel 'Salem's Lot. The character is a powerful vampire who moves to the Maine town of Jerusalem's Lot with the intent to form a vampire colony of its residents. Due to his own predations as well as those of the residents he turns, the entire town is ultimately overrun by vampirism; only a few of the residents escape. Although his true age is unknown, he claims to be so old that he predates the founding of Christianity by centuries.

== History ==
=== Salem's Lot ===
According to government records, he previously used the name Kurt Breichen in his guise as an Austrian nobleman. As Breichen, he corresponded for twelve years with Hubert "Hubie" Marsten, a former Depression-era Boston hitman living in the town of Jerusalem's Lot, Maine, or "The Lot". Marsten murdered his wife and committed suicide, but not before burning his letters with Breichen. The novel strongly implies that Marsten entered into an agreement with Breichen that allowed him to eventually come to Jerusalem's Lot.

In 1938 Breichen fled Germany due to a vampire hunt conducted by the Gestapo and settled in London, eventually securing naturalization as a British subject and adopting the English surname Barlow.

In 1975, Barlow arrives in Jerusalem's Lot in a box shipped overseas by his human familiar, an English businessman named Richard Straker. The two take residence in Marsten's former mansion, which is considered haunted by almost everyone in town. Straker poses as an antiques dealer and opens a shop in town. He tends to the shop and handles business arrangements while Barlow is never seen in public, telling inquiring visitors that Barlow is frequently away on business. Straker kidnaps a local boy, Ralphie Glick, and makes a human sacrifice of the child in an appeasement ritual. Ralphie's brother, Danny, becomes Barlow's first victim and begins to turn other locals.

Barlow makes his first appearance in the book when he encounters Dud Rogers, a hunchbacked dump custodian. Barlow also encounters Corey Bryant, a young telephone worker who has been tortured and ordered to leave town by Reggie Sawyer, the man Bryant was cuckolding. Knowing their desires, Barlow turns Rogers and Bryant.

Danny Glick later pays a night-time visit to one of his schoolmates, Mark Petrie. However, Mark, an intelligent and resourceful child, identifies Glick as a vampire and drives him off with a plastic cross. Mark sneaks into the Marsten House the next day with Susan Norton, intending to destroy Barlow. However, they are both captured by Straker; Susan is turned by Barlow and becomes a vampire, but Mark manages to escape, mortally wounding Straker in the process. Straker is later found hanging upside down, having been drained of his blood by Barlow. Petrie informs Susan's boyfriend, writer Ben Mears, of Susan's fate, and becomes part of the effort to destroy the town's vampires, together with Ben, the Catholic priest Father Callahan, doctor Jimmy Cody and the Lot's high school English teacher, Matt Burke.

When Father Callahan and Mark head over to Mark's parents to explain the danger that the family is in, the power is suddenly cut, and Barlow appears. He kills Mark's parents by smashing their heads together, but does not infect them. Barlow then takes Mark hostage briefly. Callahan pulls out his cross in an attempt to drive him off, and for a time it works, until Barlow challenges him to throw away the cross. Callahan, not having faith enough to do so, is overwhelmed by Barlow, who takes the now-useless cross and snaps it in two. Barlow then forces Callahan to drink his vampire blood, making him "unclean".

By now Mark has escaped, part of Barlow's deal with Callahan, and has fled to warn the others. At the end of the book, Barlow is destroyed by Ben Mears and Mark Petrie in the basement of Eva Miller's boarding house, whose residents have, like almost everyone else in the town, become vampires.

The town's locals remain vampires, even after the destruction of Barlow, and inevitably start to spread outside the town's limits into surrounding areas. Ben Mears and Mark Petrie flee the town, the only surviving members of the group which set out to stop Barlow and Straker. After recovering somewhat from the ordeal, they return a year later and set a brush fire near the Marsten House with the intent to burn down the town. The fire is intended to destroy as many vampires and their daylight hiding places as possible, as the beginning of an all-out effort by the two to destroy the vampire colony entirely.

=== The Dark Tower ===
In The Dark Tower series, it is revealed that Barlow is a Type One vampire, capable of hibernating for centuries and is highly intelligent and cunning. However, he seems to appear more human than the other Type One vampires when making his appearances in Salem's Lot. His appearance even seems to change toward the end of the novel into a younger-looking version of himself, de-aging from the older way he looked earlier in the novel. It is unknown if other Type One vampires can shift into a true human appearance like Barlow was able to do.

== Adaptations ==
Rutger Hauer as Barlow, climbing the ceiling in Salem's Lot (2004).

=== 1979 miniseries ===
In the 1979 miniseries, Barlow is played by Reggie Nalder, and he is depicted with a grotesque Nosferatu-like appearance. In The Dark Tower, it is mentioned in the beginning that "Type One" vampires (such as Barlow) are horribly disfigured, mutant-like creatures whose teeth grow out so wildly that they cannot close their mouths. In addition, Kurt Barlow did not speak, and only communicated in growls, hisses and grunts.

This version of Barlow has a variety of supernatural powers, such as telekinesis; he opens a locked cell door with a wave of his hand, moves his own coffin along with the (unnaturally freezing cold) crate that it is inside, he smashes the crate apart from the inside, and also causes the Petries' entire house to shake before entering. Barlow's first victim in this version is Larry Crockett, whom he attacks outside of Cully Sawyer's house. Barlow then vampirises Ralphie Glick, who had been abducted by Straker on Barlow's behalf.

=== 1995 radio drama ===
In the 1995 BBC radio dramatization of Salem's Lot, Barlow was voiced by Doug Bradley.

=== 2004 miniseries ===
In the 2004 miniseries adapted from the novel, Barlow is portrayed by Rutger Hauer. He is a sophisticated, well-dressed older gentleman and, at first glance, his only difference from the rest of the community is his mildly anachronistic appearance (his dress and behavior seem to come from an earlier time). This version of Barlow, while seemingly human, possesses great physical strength, supernatural powers (he is seen levitating and crawling across ceilings) and had eyes that occasionally glowed with hypnotic qualities. He speaks and converses at length with people, often using his insights into their lives and situations to his advantage. As in the novel, Barlow makes his first appearance in this version when he encounters Dud Rogers, a hunchbacked dump custodian, at the local dump. Seeing Dud's disability, and knowing the way other town residents treat him, Barlow offers Dud the chance to be equal or superior to them. Dud accepts and becomes Barlow's first victim. He likewise turns Ralphie Glick, who had been abducted by Straker. Both Dud and Ralphie then begin to convert the rest of the townsfolk.

=== 2024 film ===
In the 2024 film adaptation, Barlow was portrayed by Alexander Ward. Barlow's appearance in this version is similar to the one in the 1979 miniseries, but he talks (albeit briefly). He has supernatural powers, superior strength, and glowing eyes.

== Straker ==
Richard Throckett Straker is Barlow's "familiar" or human thrall. All of Barlow's business concerns are enacted by him. He buys the Marsten house and prepares the way for his master. In the novel, after Mark Petrie wounds Straker during his escape from the Marsten house, Straker is drained of his blood by Barlow who is unable to resist feeding on his servant's freshly spilled blood. Barlow is furious at this turn of events, as he considers Straker the best servant he ever possessed.

James Mason as Straker, in Salem's Lot (1979)

In Salem's Lot (1979), Straker was the main antagonist and a more prominent villain than Barlow, unlike the novel, and was alive until the climax of the miniseries. In his sole scene with Barlow, taking place in the Petrie's kitchen, Straker does the talking while Barlow carries out the action. It is Straker who taunts Father Callahan into facing Barlow in a duel of faiths to spare Mark Petrie's life. Though seemingly human, this version of Straker turns out to be something more with incredible strength, and it is implied he possesses some kind of supernatural power; he manages to summon a fast wind as he abducts Ralphie Glick in the woods and easily manages to lift Dr. Bill Norton off the ground by himself with little effort, as he impales him on a wall filled with animal horns. He was, however, still mortal and was shot and killed by Ben Mears on the stairs of the Marsten house, though he took several bullets to the abdomen and continued to move until finally succumbing to his wounds. Straker was English in this version (as played by James Mason) and came from London. He was portrayed as a mature English gentleman, neatly dressed with a calm demeanor and a subtly snooty disposition. His name, according to Constable Gillespie, was actually Richard K. Straker, though it remains unknown what the middle initial stood for.

In the 1995 BBC radio adaptation, Straker was played by John Moffatt.

Donald Sutherland as Straker, in Salem's Lot (2004).

In Salem's Lot (2004), Straker's name is once again changed, this time into Richard Thomas Straker. In this version, Straker is a gregarious and slightly eccentric American and was portrayed by Donald Sutherland. With a shock of white hair and a dense white beard, this version of Straker was still smartly dressed but less conservatively so than the 1979 version. Although he again has more screen time than Barlow in this version, his role is somewhat reduced from that of the original miniseries. He is also never actually seen in any of the same scenes with Barlow. In this version, he is again wounded by Mark Petrie as he escapes from the Marsten House, but is then killed and left hanging upside down from the rafters of the Marsten house, as in the novel, though it is not made clear by whom. Though the novel states Barlow was responsible, it is implied in this version that the house itself is possessed by an evil spirit that may have been the cause of Hubie Marsten's death decades earlier. Barlow later blames Father Callahan for Straker's death and tells him that he can take his place, which also implies Barlow did not kill Straker in this version.

In Salem's Lot (2024), Straker was played by Pilou Asbæk. This version of Straker appears to be in his thirties, far younger than his previous screen incarnations, both of whom were in their late sixties. He speaks with a European accent (actor Pilou Asbæk is Danish), but maintains the debonair gentleman image that was seen in previous adaptations. Though he is not seen exhibiting any supernatural powers or strength, he maintains a gregarious, even jovial and flirtatious manner (as witnessed in his scene with Anne Norton), though these characteristics simply mask a much darker persona. This version of Straker was killed by Mark Petrie to enable his escape from the Marsten House. He has much less screen time than in previous portrayals, though the 2024 film version had a running time under two hours compared to the three hour TV mini-series versions and omitted numerous plot threads.
