= Swiss Miss (film) =

1938 film by Hal Roach, John G. Blystone

- Theatrical release poster
- Directed by: John G. Blystone
- Screenplay by: James Parrott; Charles Melson; Felix Adler
- Story by: Jean Negulesco; Charles Rogers
- Produced by: S. S. Van Keuren
- Starring: Stan Laurel; Oliver Hardy; Della Lind; Walter Woolf King; Eric Blore
- Cinematography: Norbert Brodine; Art Lloyd
- Edited by: Bert Jordan
- Music by: Phil Charig; Marvin Hatley
- Production companies: Hal Roach Studios; Metro-Goldwyn-Mayer
- Distributed by: Loew's, Inc.
- Release date: May 20, 1938 (US)
- Running time: 73:12
- Country: United States
- Language: English

Swiss Miss is a 1938 comedy film starring Laurel and Hardy. It was directed by John G. Blystone, and produced by Hal Roach. The film features Walter Woolf King, Della Lind and Eric Blore.

== Plot ==
Stan and Ollie are mousetrap salesmen who venture to Switzerland with the expectation of thriving business, grounded in Stan's hypothesis that the country's abundance of cheese would naturally attract a proliferation of mice. However, upon arriving at a village, they encounter a disinterested populace and fall victim to a deceitful cheese shop owner who absconds with their merchandise using counterfeit currency. Left penniless, the duo resorts to seeking sustenance at a local inn, where their inability to settle the bill compels them into dishwashing duties under the scornful eye of the chef, whose ire is further stoked by their clumsiness.

Concurrently, Victor Albert, a composer, ensconced in the same establishment with his assistant Edward, endeavors to craft an opera that would eclipse the renown of his opera star wife, Anna. Unimpressed by her success overshadowing his own, Victor rebuffs her attempts at reconciliation. Anna, determined to persuade Victor to cast her in his new production, secures employment as a chambermaid at the inn, drawing closer to her estranged husband.

Amidst their misadventures, Stan's inebriation complicates their assignment to relocate Victor's piano to a remote treehouse, culminating in a calamitous encounter with a local musician's pet gorilla on a perilous rope bridge. The subsequent destruction of the instrument necessitates the use of the hotel's organ, which inadvertently produces a whimsical cacophony of bubbles due to the boys' inadvertent tampering.

In an unforeseen turn, Ollie falls for Anna, unaware of her identity, and serenades her with Stan's tuba accompaniment. Their romantic overtures are disrupted by the chef, who claims Anna as his own and issues a stern warning against attending the upcoming festival. Undeterred, Stan, Ollie, and Anna disguise themselves as gypsies for the event, where Anna's performance catches Victor's attention, leading to a tumultuous reunion between the estranged spouses.

As the duo departs the village, they are accosted by the vengeful gorilla, emblematic of the chaos that has ensnared them throughout their Swiss escapade.

== Cast ==
- Stan Laurel as Stan, a mousetrap salesman
- Oliver Hardy as Ollie, another mousetrap salesman
- Walter Woolf King as Victor Albert, an opera composer
- Della Lind as Anna Albert, his wife, an opera singer
- Eric Blore as Edward, Victor's assistant
- Adia Kuznetzoff as Chef Franzelhuber, hotel cook
- Charles Judels as Emil, cheese shop owner
- Eddie Kane as Tradesman (uncredited)
- Anita Garvin as Tradesman's wife (uncredited)
- Ludovico Tomarchio as Luigi
- Franz Hug as a flag thrower
- Jean de Briac as Enrico
- George Sorel as Joseph
- Charles Gemora as a gorilla

Notes:

- Austrian actress Della Lind made her American film debut in Swiss Miss. She was under contract to M-G-M, and was borrowed for the film. Lind was given the choice of either Walter Woolf King or Ray Middleton to play opposite, and picked King. It was also her final film appearance.
- Charles Gemora, who plays the gorilla, had six years earlier appeared in the title role of a Laurel and Hardy theatrical short The Chimp.
- Franz Hug demonstrated the art of flag throwing during the opening ceremonies of the 1936 Summer Olympic Games, held in Berlin, Germany.

== Production notes ==
The working title for Swiss Miss was "Swiss Cheese". Production dates for the film were from December 28, 1937 to February 26, 1938, with additional scenes shot on April 1 and 21. Location shooting took place at Lake Arrowhead and Stone Canyon, both in California.

Producer Hal Roach had originally intended that the film be shot in color, but changed his mind because of the cost of doing so. Roach is said to have interfered during the film's editing, much to Stan Laurel's exasperation. Always a large creative force behind the camera, Laurel objected to Roach's removing scenes, including the addition of a bomb in the composer's piano, where the tapping of a particular key would set it off. A drunken Stan is seen touching the piano keys during the piano delivery sequence involving the gorilla; Laurel initially thought the inclusion of the bomb would give the scene more power. A musical number in the cheese shop was also removed; only a few lyrics remain in the film. Roach also filled-in when director John G. Blystone was ill, although little of the footage he shot ended up in the final film.

The additional scenes which were shot in April were directed by Sidney Van Keuren, the film's associate producer.

== Songs ==
The songs "The Cricket Song," "Yo-Ho-Dee-O-Lay-Hee," "I Can't Get Over the Alps" and "Gypsy Song" were written by Phil Charig (music) and Arthur Quenzer (lyrics). "Let Me Call You Sweetheart", which Ollie sings to serenade his sweetheart, accompanied by Stan on the tuba, was written by Beth Slater Whitson and Leo Friedman (music and lyrics).

== Reception ==
Leonard Maltin wrote, "Contrived romantic story with music tries hard to submerge L&H, but Stan and Ollie's scenes save film, especially when Ollie serenades his true love with Stan playing tuba." Leslie Halliwell was not enthusiastic: "Operetta style vehicle which constrains its stars, since their material is somewhat below vintage anyway. Not painful to watch, but disappointing."
