= Salem's Lot (2004 miniseries) =

2004 television miniseries

- Based on: 'Salem's Lot by Stephen King
- Screenplay by: Peter Filardi
- Directed by: Mikael Salomon
- Starring: Rob Lowe; Andre Braugher; Donald Sutherland; Samantha Mathis; Robert Mammone; Dan Byrd; Rutger Hauer; James Cromwell
- Theme music composer: Christopher Gordon; Lisa Gerrard
- Countries of origin: United States; Australia
- Original language: English
- No. of episodes: 2

Production
- Producers: Jeffrey M. Hayes; Brett Popplewell; Marc van Buuren; Mark Wolper
- Cinematography: Ben Nott
- Editor: Robert A. Ferretti
- Running time: 181 minutes
- Production companies: The Wolper Organization; Warner Bros. Television
- Budget: $15 million

Original release
- Network: TNT
- Release: June 20 – June 21, 2004

Salem's Lot is a 2004 two-part horror television miniseries which first aired on TNT on June 20 and ended its run on June 21, 2004. It is the second television adaptation of Stephen King's 1975 vampire novel 'Salem's Lot following the 1979 miniseries adaptation. Although the novel and original miniseries were both set in the 1970s, this version updates the story to take place in the 2000s.

== Plot ==
Ben Mears attacks priest Donald Callahan in a homeless shelter in Detroit, and they fall out a window. In the hospital where he and Callahan are taken, Ben is asked by an orderly why, as a Christian, he should not let Ben die for attacking a priest. Ben tells his story.

Sometime earlier, Ben, a writer, returns to his hometown of Jerusalem's Lot (known as "'Salem's Lot") in Maine, to write a novel. He tells Susan Norton, a waitress and former art student, that when he was a child he entered the house of Hubie Marsten, a Prohibition-era gangster. Local legend has it the Marsten House is possessed by evil, and that Marsten was a devil worshipper who murdered children. Ben overheard Marsten begging for his life to some unseen evil force before seemingly hanging himself. Attempting to flee from the house, Ben believed he heard Marsten's last victim crying for help, but was too afraid to find him. Thirty years later, Ben plans to rent the house to find catharsis and gather material for his novel, but discovers it has been sold by Larry Crockett to antique dealers Richard Straker and Kurt Barlow.

Salem's Lot is rife with dark secrets: Crockett is an immoral businessman who sexually abuses his teenage daughter Ruth. When Ruth spends time with a disabled garbageman named Dud Rodgers, Crockett gets him fired. Eva Prunier, proprietor of the boarding house where Ben stays, played evil games with Marsten when she and her peers were teenagers. Charlie Rhodes, cruelty-obsessed Vietnam veteran and school bus driver, torments the children he transports. Trailer park residents Roy and Sandy McDougall physically abuse their baby, blackmailing Dr. Jimmy Cody after he has an affair with Sandy.

Following Straker and Barlow's arrival, young Ralphie Glick is murdered; his body is never found. His brother Danny sickens and dies after being visited by Ralphie, now a vampire. Dud Rodgers meets Barlow, who offers him freedom from his disability. Dud accepts and Barlow turns him into a vampire. Laborer Mike Ryerson buries Danny after his funeral, then also sickens and dies. Becoming a vampire, he tempts gay high school teacher Matt Burke, who repels him but suffers a heart attack. Ben's blossoming relationship with Susan causes jealousy with her old boyfriend Floyd Tibbits. Floyd is bitten by Dud and starts to become a vampire. After starting a fight with Ben, the two spend the night in jail. Ben refuses to allow Floyd into his cell, and he is found dead the following morning, having chewed open his wrists in an attempt to drink his own blood.

Susan and schoolboy Mark Petrie are captured by Straker when they break into the Marsten house. Mark escapes, but Susan is taken to the cellar to meet Barlow. Ben, Mark, Callahan and Cody act as vampire hunters. In the Marsten house, they find Straker's body drained of blood. They destroy the vampires in the cellar, but Ben discovers Susan has been turned. Instead of destroying her, Ben intends to destroy Barlow, hopeful that Susan might be restored.

After Barlow kills Mark's mother, Callahan tries saving Mark by confronting Barlow, but his religious faith is insufficient. Callahan is forced to drink Barlow's blood, turning him into Barlow's servant.

Burke is murdered by Callahan. Ben, Jimmy and Mark realize Barlow is hiding at Eva's boarding house. As they arrive, Jimmy is killed by a booby trap. Ben and Mark destroy Barlow. Susan, still a vampire, tempts Ben into joining her. When Susan turns to attack Mark, Ben destroys her with a stake. Ben and Mark set the Marsten House afire, and during a chase with the vampiric Charlie, a gas station explodes. As fires spread, Callahan vows revenge against Ben. The town's vampires flock to him as their leader.

As Ben concludes his story, the orderly realizes Ben was not acting alone. The orderly finds Callahan suffocated with a pillow by Mark. Mark slips into Ben's room and tells him the hunt is over. Ben suffers a cardiac arrest. The orderly finds Mark tells him he cannot believe the story, but lets him go. Doctors battle to keep Ben alive as he begins dying, finally at peace.

== Cast ==
=== Main cast ===
- Rob Lowe as Ben Mears
- Samantha Mathis as Susan Norton
- Dan Byrd as Mark Petrie
- Rutger Hauer as Kurt Barlow
- Andre Braugher as Matt Burke
- Robert Mammone as Dr. Jimmy Cody
- Donald Sutherland as Richard Straker
- James Cromwell as Father Callahan

=== Supporting cast ===
- Tara Morice as Joyce Petrie
- Andy Anderson as Charlie Rhodes
- Robert Grubb as Larry Crockett
- Penny McNamee as Ruth Crockett
- Steven Vidler as Sheriff Parkins Gillespie
- Brendan Cowell as Dud Rogers
- Christopher Morris as Mike Ryerson
- Todd MacDonald as Floyd Tibbits
- Paul Ashcroft as Royce McDougall
- André De Vanny as Danny Glick
- Zac Richmond as Ralphie Glick
- Rebecca Gibney as Marjorie Glick
- Joe Petruzzi as Tony Glick
- Bree Desborough as Sandy McDougall
- Elizabeth Alexander as Ann Norton
- Julia Blake as Eva Prunier
- Martin Vaughan as Ed "Weasel" Craig
- Queenie van de Zandt as Betty
- Daniel Smorgon as Young Ben
- Nicholas Bell as Frank

== Production ==
In February 2003, it was announced TNT had cast Rob Lowe as the lead in a new adaptation of Stephen King's 'Salem's Lot with Peter Filardi writing the script and Mikael Salomon directing. Rutger Hauer and Samantha Mathis joined the cast in April of that year.

In his memoir, Love Life, Rob Lowe stated that he had a difficult time working with Rutger Hauer. Lowe said, "I once starred in a big miniseries that culminated with the villain giving a two-page monologue trying to goad me into killing him. The actor playing the bad guy wanted to ad lib his own version of the movie-ending speech. Although he was playing a vampire, he went into a soliloquy about being a cowboy. The director was not impressed. After a very tense negotiation, the actor was forced to shit-can his self-penned opus and stick to the original script. There was only one problem: He hadn't bothered to learn it." Lowe noted that because there wasn't time for Hauer to memorize the lines organically, his character's monologue had to be written on cue cards and placed next to Lowe's head.

== Reception ==
=== Critical response ===
Review aggregator Rotten Tomatoes gives the miniseries a 69% approval rating based on 26 reviews, with an average rating of 5.6/10. The website's critics consensus reads, "Salem's Lot is a bit anemic due to a dearth of proper scares, but its effectively creepy atmosphere and solid performances make for a respectable adaptation of Stephen King's revered novel." On Metacritic, the miniseries has a score of 65 out of 100, based on 17 critics, indicating "Generally favorable reviews"

=== Viewership ===
The broadcast of Salem's Lot drew 5.9 million viewers upon its debut, making it the number 1 longform program on basic cable for the year.

=== Accolades ===
Year	Award	Category	Nominee(s)	Result
2005	Primetime Emmy Awards	Outstanding Music Composition for a Limited or Anthology Series, Movie or Special	Christopher Gordon and Lisa Gerrard	Nominated
2005	Saturn Awards	Best Television Presentation	Jeffrey M. Hayes, Brett Popplewell, Marc van Buuren and Mark Wolper	Nominated
2005	Saturn Awards	Best Supporting Actress on Television	Samantha Mathis	Nominated
2005	American Society of Cinematographers	Outstanding Achievement in Cinematography in Motion Picture, Limited Series, or Pilot Made for Television	Ben Nott	Nominated
2005	Australian Cinematographers Society	Cinematographer of the Year	Ben Nott	Won
2005	Australian Cinematographers Society	Gold Tripod	Ben Nott	Won
2005	International Film Music Critics Association	Best Original Score for Television	Christopher Gordon and Lisa Gerrard	Nominated
2005	Screen Music Awards	Best Soundtrack Album	Christopher Gordon and Lisa Gerrard	Nominated
2005	Screen Music Awards	Best Music for a Mini-Series or Telemovie	Christopher Gordon and Lisa Gerrard	Nominated
2005	Young Artist Award	Best Performance in a TV Movie, Miniseries or Special - Leading Young Actor	Dan Byrd	Nominated

== See also ==
- Vampire film
- List of vampire television series
