= Gary Dauberman =

American screenwriter and director

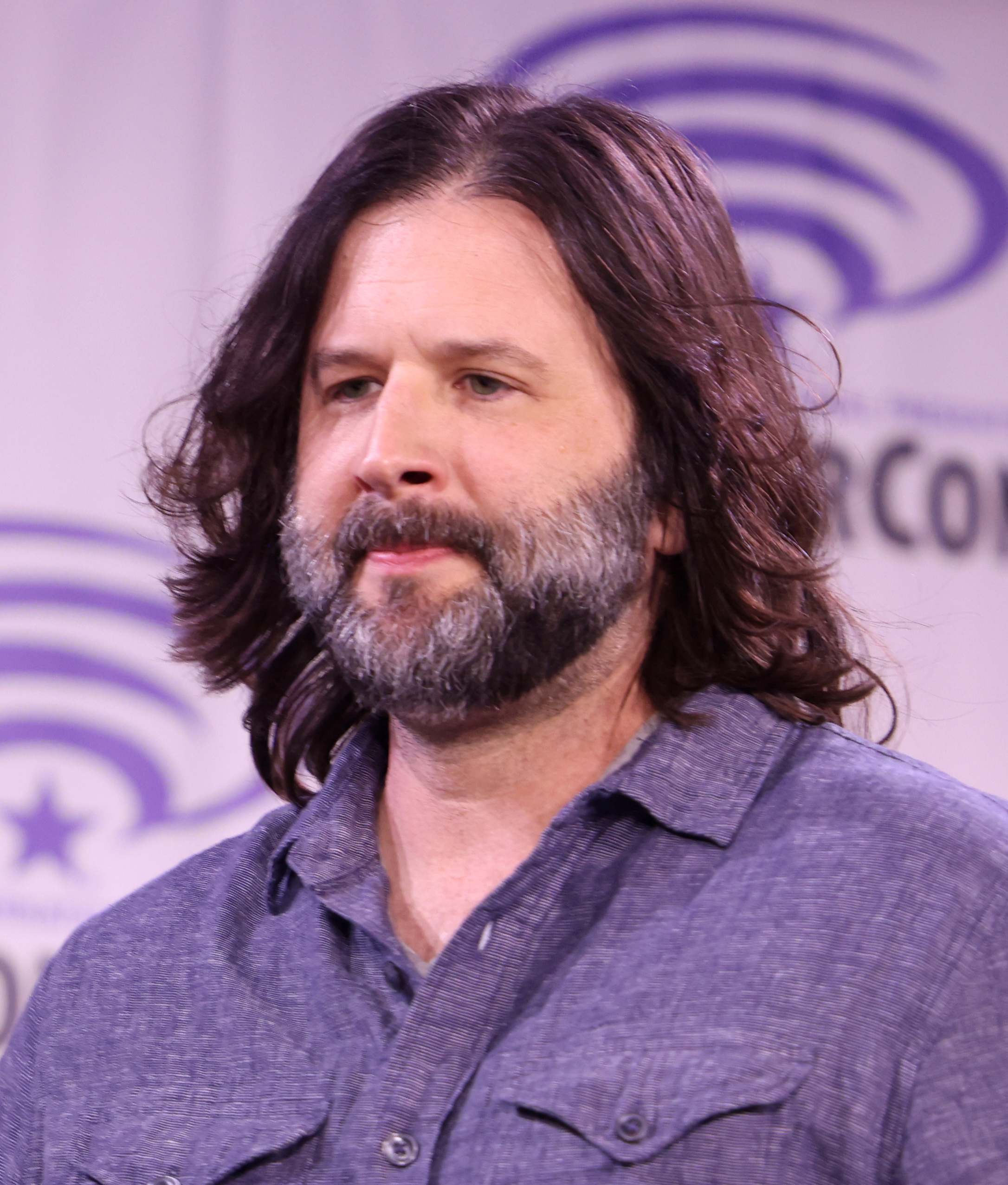
- Dauberman in 2025
- Education: Temple University
- Occupations: Screenwriter; director; producer
- Years active: 2007–present
- Spouse: Sara Dauberman
- Children: Three

Gary Dauberman is an American screenwriter and director. He is best known for writing the supernatural horror film It (2017) and its follow-up It Chapter Two (2019), which are based on the novel of the same name.

In 2026, he signed a first-look producing deal with Blumhouse Atomic.

== Early life ==
Dauberman grew up in Glen Mills, Pennsylvania and graduated from Penncrest High School in 1995. He attended Delaware County Community College for two years, where he majored in communications, before transferring to Temple University, where he graduated with a degree in Film and Media Studies in 2001.

== Filmography ==
Film

Year	Title	Director	Writer	Producer
2007	Blood Monkey	No	Yes	No
2008	Swamp Devil	No	Yes	No
2014	Annabelle	No	Yes	No
2016	Within	No	Yes	No
2016	Wolves at the Door	No	Yes	Co-producer
2017	Annabelle: Creation	No	Yes	No
2017	It	No	Yes	No
2018	The Nun	No	Yes	Executive
2019	The Curse of La Llorona	No	No	Yes
2019	Annabelle Comes Home	Yes	Yes	No
2019	It Chapter Two	No	Yes	Executive
2023	The Nun II	No	No	Executive
2024	'Salem's Lot	Yes	Yes	Executive
2025	Until Dawn	No	Yes	Yes
2026	Passenger	No	No	Yes
2026	Street Fighter	No	Story	No
2027	The Revenge of La Llorona	No	No	Yes

Additional literary material

- Blue Beetle (2023)

Television

Year	Title	Writer	Executive producer	Notes
2007	In the Spider's Web	Yes	No	TV movie
2019	Swamp Thing	Yes	Yes	Also developer, Wrote episode "Pilot"
