= List of Marvel Comics publications (W–Z) =

Marvel Comics is an American comic book company dating to 1961. This is a list of the publications it has released in its history under the "Marvel Comics" imprint. The list does not include collected editions; trade paperbacks; digital comics; free, promotional giveaways; sketchbooks; poster books or magazines, nor does it include series published by other Marvel imprints such as Epic, Icon or Star. It also does not include titles published by Marvel's pre-1961 predecessors Timely Comics and Atlas Comics.

- List of Marvel Comics publications (A)
- List of Marvel Comics publications (B–C)
- List of Marvel Comics publications (D–E)
- List of Marvel Comics publications (F–G)
- List of Marvel Comics publications (H–L)
- List of Marvel Comics publications (M)
- List of Marvel Comics publications (N–R)
- List of Marvel Comics publications (S)
- List of Marvel Comics publications (T–V)

== W ==
| Title | Series | Issues | Dates | Notes | Reference |
|---|---|---|---|---|---|
| Wade Wilson: Deadpool | | #1– | Apr 2026 – present | | |
| Wakanda | | #1–5 | Dec 2022 – Apr 2023 | limited series | |
| Wakanda Forever | Amazing Spider-Man | #1 | Aug 2018 | one-shot; part one of three | |
| Wakanda Forever | Avengers | #1 | Oct 2018 | one-shot; part three of three | |
| Wakanda Forever | X-Men | #1 | Sep 2018 | one-shot; part two of three | |
| The War | | #1–4 | Aug 1989 – Mar 1990 | limited series | |
| War Is Hell | vol. 1 | #1–15 | Jan 1973 – Oct 1975 | | |
| War Is Hell | vol. 2 | #1 | Mar 2019 | one-shot | |
| War Is Hell | The First Flight of the Phantom Eagle | #1–5 | May 2008 – Sep 2008 | limited series | |
| War Machine | vol. 1 | #1–25 | Apr 1994 – Apr 1996 | | |
| War Machine | vol. 2 | #1–12 | Feb 2009 – Jan 2010 | Dark Reign tie-in | |
| War of Kings | | #1–6 | May 2009 – Oct 2009 | limited series | |
| War of Kings | Ascension | #1–4 | Jun 2009 – Sep 2009 | limited series | |
| War of Kings | Darkhawk | #1–2 | Apr 2009 – May 2009 | limited series | |
| War of Kings | Savage World of Skaar | #1 | Aug 2009 | one-shot | |
| War of Kings | Warriors | #1–2 | Sep 2009 – Oct 2009 | limited series | |
| War of Kings | Who Will Rule? | #1 | Nov 2009 | one-shot | |
| War of the Realms | | #1–6 | Jun 2019 – Aug 2019 | limited series | |
| War of the Realms | Giant-Man | #1–3 | Jul 2019 – Aug 2019 | limited series | |
| War of the Realms | Journey into Mystery | #1–5 | Jun 2019 – Aug 2019 | limited series | |
| War of the Realms | New Agents of Atlas | #1–4 | Jul 2019 – Aug 2019 | limited series | |
| War of the Realms | Omega | #1 | Sep 2019 | one-shot | |
| War of the Realms | Punisher | #1–3 | Jun 2019 – Aug 2019 | limited series | |
| War of the Realms | Spider-Man and The League of Realms | #1–3 | Jul 2019 – Aug 2019 | limited series | |
| War of the Realms | Strikeforce: The Dark Elf Realm | #1 | Jul 2019 | one-shot | |
| War of the Realms | Strikeforce: The Land of Giants | #1 | Jul 2019 | one-shot | |
| War of the Realms | Strikeforce: The War Avengers | #1 | Jul 2019 | one-shot | |
| War of the Realms | Uncanny X-Men | #1–3 | Jun 2019 – Aug 2019 | limited series | |
| War of the Realms | War Scrolls | #1–3 | Jun 2019 – Aug 2019 | limited series | |
| Warhammer 40,000 | Marneus Calgar | #1–5 | Dec 2020 – Apr 2021 | limited series | |
| Warhammer 40,000 | Sisters of Battle | #1–5 | Oct 2021 – Mar 2022 | limited series | |
| Warheads | | #1–14 | Jun 1992 – Aug 1993 | | |
| Warheads | Black Dawn | #1–2 | Jul 1993 – Aug 1993 | limited series | |
| Warlock | vol. 1 | #1–15 | Aug 1972 – Nov 1976 | | |
| Warlock | vol. 2 | #1–6 | Dec 1982 – May 1983 | limited series | |
| Warlock | vol. 3 | #1–6 | May 1992 – Oct 1992 | limited series | |
| Warlock | vol. 4 | #1–4 | Nov 1998 – Feb 1999 | limited series | |
| Warlock | vol. 5 | #1–9 | Oct 1999 – Jun 2000 | | |
| Warlock | vol. 6 | #1–4 | Nov 2004 – Feb 2005 | limited series | |
| Warlock | Chronicles | #1–8 | Jul 1993 – Feb 1994 | limited series | |
| Warlock | Rebirth | #1–5 | Jun 2023 – Oct 2023 | limited series | |
| Warlock and the Infinity Watch | | #1–42 | Feb 1992 – Aug 1995 | | |
| Warriors Three | | #1–4 | Jan 2011 – Apr 2011 | limited series | |
| Wasp | | #1–4 | Mar 2023 – Jun 2023 | limited series | |
| Wastelanders | Black Widow | #1 | Mar 2022 | one-shot | |
| Wastelanders | Doom | #1 | Mar 2022 | one-shot | |
| Wastelanders | Hawkeye | #1 | Feb 2022 | one-shot | |
| Wastelanders | Star-Lord | #1 | Feb 2022 | one-shot | |
| Wastelanders | Wolverine | #1 | Feb 2022 | one-shot | |
| Way of X | | #1–5 | Jun 2021 – Oct 2021 | | |
| WCW World Championship Wrestling | | #1–12 | Apr 1992 – Mar 1993 | | |
| Weapon H | | #1–12 | May 2018 – Mar 2019 | | |
| Weapon Plus: World War IV | | #1 | Mar 2020 | one-shot | |
| Weapon X | vol. 1 | #1–4 | Mar 1995 – Jun 1995 | limited series; Age of Apocalypse (1995) tie-in | |
| Weapon X | vol. 2 | #1–28 | Nov 2002 – Nov 2004 | | |
| Weapon X | vol. 3 | #1–27 | Jun 2017 – Feb 2019 | | |
| Weapon X | Days of Future Now | #1–5 | Sep 2005 – Jan 2006 | limited series | |
| Weapon X | First Class | #1–3 | Jan 2009 – Mar 2009 | limited series | |
| Weapon X | Noir | #1 | Jul 2010 | one-shot | |
| Weapon X: The Draft | Agent Zero | #1 | Oct 2002 | one-shot | |
| Weapon X: The Draft | Kane | #1 | Oct 2002 | one-shot | |
| Weapon X: The Draft | Marrow | #1 | Oct 2002 | one-shot | |
| Weapon X: The Draft | Sauron | #1 | Oct 2002 | one-shot | |
| Weapon X: The Draft | Wild Child | #1 | Oct 2002 | one-shot | |
| Weapon X-Men | vol. 1 | #1–4 | May 2024 – Jul 2024 | limited series | |
| Weapon X-Men | vol. 2 | #1–5 | Apr 2025 – Aug 2025 | limited series | |
| Weapon Zero/Silver Surfer | | #1 | Jan 1997 | one-shot; co-published with Top Cow Productions and Image Comics | |
| Weapons of Mutant Destruction | Alpha | #1 | Aug 2017 | one-shot | |
| Web of Black Widow | | #1–5 | Nov 2019 – Mar 2020 | limited series | |
| Web of Carnage | | #1 | Sep 2023 | one-shot | |
| Web of Scarlet Spider | | #1–4 | Oct 1995 – Jan 1996 | limited series | |
| Web of Spider-Man | vol. 1 | #1–129 | Apr 1985 – Oct 1995 | | |
| Web of Spider-Man | vol. 1 | #129.1–129.2 | Oct 2012 | | |
| Web of Spider-Man | vol. 1 | Annual #1–10 | 1985 – 1994 | | |
| Web of Spider-Man | vol. 1 | Super Special #1 | 1995 | | |
| Web of Spider-Man | vol. 2 | #1–12 | Dec 2009 – Nov 2010 | | |
| Web of Spider-Man | vol. 3 | #1–5 | Aug 2021 – Nov 2021 | limited series; titled W.E.B. of Spider-Man | |
| Web of Spider-Man | vol. 4 | #1 | May 2024 | one-shot | |
| Web of Spider-Verse: New Blood | | #1 | May 2025 | one-shot | |
| Web of Venom | | #1 | Jun 2026 | one-shot | |
| Web of Venom | Carnage Born | #1 | Jan 2019 | one-shot | |
| Web of Venom | Cult of Carnage | #1 | Jun 2019 | one-shot | |
| Web of Venom | Empyre's End | #1 | Jan 2021 | one-shot | |
| Web of Venom | Funeral Pyre | #1 | Sep 2019 | one-shot | |
| Web of Venom | The Good Son | #1 | Mar 2020 | one-shot | |
| Web of Venom | Ve'Nam | #1 | Oct 2018 | one-shot | |
| Web of Venom | Venom Unleashed | #1 | Mar 2019 | one-shot | |
| Web of Venom | Wraith | #1 | Nov 2020 | one-shot | |
| Web of Venomverse: Fresh Brains | | #1 | Jun 2025 | one-shot | |
| Web Warriors | | #1–11 | Jan 2016 – Nov 2016 | | |
| Webspinners: Tales of Spider-Man | | #1–18 | Jan 1999 – Jun 2000 | | |
| The Wedding of Dracula | | #1 | Jan 1993 | one-shot | |
| The Weeknd Presents: Starboy | | #1 | Aug 2018 | one-shot | |
| Weird Wonder Tales | | #1–22 | Dec 1973 – May 1977 | | |
| Weirdworld | vol. 1 | #1–5 | Aug 2015 – Dec 2015 | limited series; Secret Wars (2015) tie-in | |
| Weirdworld | vol. 2 | #1–6 | Feb 2016 – Jul 2016 | | |
| Werewolf by Night | vol. 1 | #1–43 | Sep 1972 – Mar 1977 | | |
| Werewolf by Night | vol. 1 | Giant-Size #2–5 | Oct 1974 – Jul 1975 | continued from Giant-Size Creatures; titled Giant-Size Werewolf | |
| Werewolf by Night | vol. 2 | #1–6 | Feb 1998 – Jul 1998 | | |
| Werewolf by Night | vol. 3 | #1–4 | Dec 2020 – Mar 2021 | limited series | |
| Werewolf by Night | vol. 4 | #1 | Nov 2023 | one-shot | |
| Werewolf by Night | vol. 5 | #1–10 | Oct 2024 – Jul 2025 | also known as Werewolf by Night: Red Band | |
| Werewolf by Night | Blood Hunt | #1 | Sep 2024 | one-shot | |
| Werewolf by Night | Blood Moon Rise | #1 | Sep 2025 | one-shot | |
| West Coast Avengers | vol. 1 | #1–4 | Sep 1984 – Dec 1984 | limited series | |
| West Coast Avengers | vol. 2 | #1–47 | Oct 1985 – Aug 1989 | continued as Avengers West Coast | |
| West Coast Avengers | vol. 2 | Annual #1–4 | 1986 – 1989 | continued as Avengers West Coast | |
| West Coast Avengers | vol. 3 | #1–10 | Oct 2018 – Jun 2019 | | |
| West Coast Avengers | vol. 4 | #1–10 | Jan 2025 – Oct 2025 | | |
| Western Gunfighters | vol. 2 | #1–33 | Aug 1970 – Nov 1975 | vol. 1 published by Atlas Comics | |
| The Western Kid | vol. 2 | #1–5 | Dec 1971 – Aug 1972 | vol. 1 published by Atlas Comics | |
| Western Team-Up | | #1 | Nov 1973 | one-shot | |
| Wha... Huh? | | #1 | 2005 | one-shot | |
| What If...? | vol. 1 | #1–47 | Feb 1977 – Oct 1984 | | |
| What If...? | vol. 2 | Special #1 | Jun 1988 | one-shot | |
| What If...? | vol. 3 | #1–114 -1 | Jul 1989 – Nov 1998 | | |
| What If...? | vol. 4 | #200 | Feb 2011 | one-shot | |
| What If...? | Age of Ultron | #1–5 | Jun 2014 | limited series | |
| What If...? | Annihilation | #1 | Jan 2008 | one-shot | |
| What If...? | Astonishing X-Men | #1 | Feb 2010 | one-shot | |
| What If...? | Aunt May Had Died Instead of Uncle Ben? | #1 | Feb 2005 | one-shot | |
| What If...? | Avengers Disassembled | #1 | Jan 2007 | one-shot | |
| What If...? | AVX | #1–4 | Sep 2013 | limited series | |
| What If...? | Civil War | #1 | Feb 2008 | one-shot | |
| What If...? | Daredevil | #1 | Feb 2006 | one-shot | |
| What If...? | Daredevil vs. Elektra | #1 | Feb 2010 | one-shot | |
| What If...? | Dark Reign | #1 | Feb 2011 | one-shot | |
| What If...? | Doctor Doom Had Become the Thing? | #1 | Feb 2005 | one-shot | |
| What If...? | Fallen Son | #1 | Feb 2009 | one-shot | |
| What If...? | Fantastic Four | #1 | Feb 2006 | one-shot | |
| What If...? | General Ross Had Become the Hulk? | #1 | Feb 2005 | one-shot | |
| What If...? | Ghost Rider | #1 | Dec 2018 | one-shot | |
| What If...? | House of M | #1 | Feb 2009 | one-shot | |
| What If...? | Iron Man: Demon in an Armor | #1 | Feb 2011 | one-shot | |
| What If...? | Jessica Jones | #1 | Sep 2026 | one-shot | |
| What If...? | Jessica Jones Had Joined the Avengers? | #1 | Feb 2005 | one-shot | |
| What If...? | Karen Page Had Lived? | #1 | Feb 2005 | one-shot | |
| What If...? | Magik | #1 | Dec 2018 | one-shot | |
| What If...? | Magneto Had Formed the X-Men With Professor X? | #1 | Feb 2005 | one-shot | |
| What If...? | Miles Morales | #1–5 | May 2022 – Sep 2022 | limited series | |
| What If...? | Newer Fantastic Four | #1 | Feb 2009 | one-shot | |
| What If...? | Planet Hulk | #1 | Dec 2007 | one-shot | |
| What If...? | Runaways | #1 | Oct 2026 | one-shot | |
| What If...? | Secret Invasion | #1 | Feb 2010 | one-shot | |
| What If...? | Sub-Mariner | #1 | Feb 2006 | one-shot | |
| What If...? | The Punisher | #1 | Dec 2018 | one-shot | |
| What If...? | This Was the Fantastic Four? A Tribute to Mike Wieringo | #1 | Aug 2008 | one-shot | |
| What If...? | Uncanny X-Men | #1 | Aug 2026 | one-shot | |
| What If...? | World War Hulk | #1 | Feb 2010 | one-shot | |
| What If...? Captain America | vol. 1 | #1 | Feb 2006 | one-shot | |
| What If...? Captain America | vol. 2 | #1 | Oct 2026 | one-shot | |
| What If...? Dark | Carnage | #1 | Nov 2023 | one-shot | |
| What If...? Dark | Loki | #1 | Sep 2023 | one-shot | |
| What If...? Dark | Moon Knight | #1 | Oct 2023 | one-shot | |
| What If...? Dark | Spider-Gwen | #1 | Sep 2023 | one-shot | |
| What If...? Dark | Tomb of Dracula | #1 | Jan 2024 | one-shot | |
| What If...? Dark | Venom | #1 | Oct 2023 | one-shot | |
| What If...? Galactus | Galactus Transformed Gambit? | #1 | Mar 2025 | one-shot | |
| What If...? Galactus | Galactus Transformed Hulk? | #1 | Mar 2025 | one-shot | |
| What If...? Galactus | Galactus Transformed Moon Knight? | #1 | Mar 2025 | one-shot | |
| What If...? Galactus | Galactus Transformed Rogue? | #1 | Mar 2025 | one-shot | |
| What If...? Galactus | Galactus Transformed Spider-Gwen? | #1 | Mar 2025 | one-shot | |
| What If? Infinity | Dark Reign | #1 | Dec 2015 | one-shot | |
| What If? Infinity | Guardians of the Galaxy | #1 | Dec 2015 | one-shot | |
| What If? Infinity | Inhumans | #1 | Dec 2015 | one-shot | |
| What If? Infinity | Thanos | #1 | Dec 2015 | one-shot | |
| What If? Infinity | X-Men | #1 | Dec 2015 | one-shot | |
| What If...? Secret Wars | vol. 1 | #1 | Feb 2009 | one-shot | |
| What If...? Secret Wars | vol. 2 | #1 | Sep 2026 | one-shot | |
| What If? Spider-Man | vol. 1 | #1 | Feb 2011 | one-shot | |
| What If? Spider-Man | vol. 2 | #1 | Dec 2018 | one-shot | |
| What If? Spider-Man | vol. 3 | #1 | Sep 2026 | one-shot | |
| What If? Spider-Man | Back in Black | #1 | Feb 2009 | one-shot | |
| What If? Spider-Man | House of M | #1 | Feb 2010 | one-shot | |
| What If? Spider-Man | The Other | #1 | Jan 2007 | one-shot | |
| What If? Spider-Man | vs. Wolverine | #1 | Mar 2008 | one-shot | |
| What If? Thor | vol. 1 | #1 | Feb 2006 | one-shot | |
| What If? Thor | vol. 2 | #1 | Dec 2018 | one-shot | |
| What If? Thor | vol. 3 | #1 | Aug 2026 | one-shot | |
| What If...? Venom | | #1–5 | Apr 2024 – Aug 2024 | limited series | |
| What If? Wolverine | | #1 | Feb 2006 | one-shot | |
| What If? Wolverine | Enemy of the State | #1 | Jan 2007 | one-shot | |
| What If? Wolverine | Father | #1 | Feb 2011 | one-shot | |
| What If? X-Men | vol. 1 | #1 | Dec 2018 | one-shot | |
| What If? X-Men | vol. 2 | #1 | Oct 2026 | one-shot | |
| What If? X-Men | Age of Apocalypse | #1 | Feb 2007 | one-shot | |
| What If? X-Men | Deadly Genesis | #1 | Feb 2007 | one-shot | |
| What If? X-Men | Rise and Fall of the Shi'ar Empire | #1 | Feb 2008 | one-shot | |
| What The--?! | | #1–26 | Aug 1988 – Winter 1993 | | |
| Where Creatures Roam | | #1–8 | Jul 1970 – Sep 1971 | | |
| Where Monsters Dwell | vol. 1 | #1–38 | Jan 1970 – Oct 1975 | | |
| Where Monsters Dwell | vol. 2 | #1–5 | Jul 2015 – Dec 2015 | limited series; Secret Wars (2015) tie-in | |
| White Tiger | | #1–6 | Jan 2007 – Nov 2007 | limited series | |
| White Tiger | Reborn | #1 | Dec 2025 | one-shot | |
| White Widow | | #1–4 | Jan 2024 – Apr 2024 | limited series | |
| Wiccan: Witches' Road | | #1–5 | Feb 2026 – Jun 2026 | limited series | |
| Wiccan & Hulkling: Raid of Ultron | | #1 | Jul 2026 | one-shot | |
| Widowmaker | | #1–4 | Feb 2011 – Apr 2011 | limited series | |
| Widowmakers: Red Guardian and Yelena Belova | | #1 | Jan 2021 | one-shot | |
| Wild Cards: The Drawing of Cards | | #1–4 | Sep 2022 – Dec 2022 | limited series | |
| Wild Thing | vol. 1 | #1–7 | Apr 1993 – Oct 1993 | | |
| Wild Thing | vol. 2 | #1–5 | Oct 1999 – Feb 2000 | limited series | |
| WildC.A.T.s/X-Men | The Golden Age | #1 | Feb 1997 | one-shot; co-published with Image Comics | |
| WildC.A.T.s/X-Men | The Modern Age | #1 | Aug 1997 | one-shot; co-published with Image Comics | |
| WildC.A.T.s/X-Men | The Silver Age | #1 | Jun 1997 | one-shot; co-published with Image Comics | |
| The Will of Doom | | #1 | Feb 2026 | one-shot | |
| Willow | | #1–3 | Aug 1988 – Oct 1988 | limited series; adaptation of the 1988 movie | |
| Winter Guard | | #1–4 | Oct 2021 – Feb 2022 | limited series | |
| Winter Soldier | vol. 1 | #1–19 | Apr 2012 – Aug 2013 | | |
| Winter Soldier | vol. 2 | #1–5 | Feb 2019 – Jun 2019 | limited series | |
| Winter Soldier | The Bitter March | #1–5 | Apr 2014 – Sep 2014 | limited series | |
| Winter Soldier | Winter Kills | #1 | Feb 2007 | one-shot | |
| Wisdom | | #1–6 | Jan 2007 – Jul 2007 | limited series | |
| Witchblade/ | Elektra | #1 | Mar 1997 | one-shot; co-published with Top Cow Productions and Image Comics | |
| Witchblade/ | The Punisher | #1 | Jun 2007 | one-shot; co-published with Top Cow Productions and Image Comics | |
| Witchblade/ | Wolverine | #1 | Jun 2004 | one-shot; co-published with Top Cow Productions and Image Comics | |
| Witches | | #1–4 | Aug 2004 – Sep 2004 | limited series | |
| Wolfpack | | #1–12 | Aug 1988 – Jul 1989 | limited series | |
| Wolverine | vol. 1 | #1–4 | Sep 1982 – Dec 1982 | limited series | |
| Wolverine | vol. 2 | #1–189 -1 | Nov 1988 – Jun 2003 | | |
| Wolverine | vol. 2 | '95, '96, 97 | 1995 – 1997 | Annuals | |
| Wolverine | vol. 2 | 1999, 2000, 2001 | 1999 – 2001 | Annuals | |
| Wolverine | vol. 3 | #1–74 | Jul 2003 – Aug 2009 | continued as Dark Wolverine | |
| Wolverine | vol. 3 | Annual #1–2 | Dec 2007 – Nov 2008 | | |
| Wolverine | vol. 3 | Giant-Size #1 | Dec 2006 | | |
| Wolverine | vol. 4 | #900 | Jul 2010 | one-shot | |
| Wolverine | vol. 5 | #1–20, 300–317; 5.1 | Nov 2010 – Feb 2013 | renumbered after #20 to #300 | |
| Wolverine | vol. 5 | #1000 | Apr 2011 | one-shot | |
| Wolverine | vol. 5 | Annual #1 | Oct 2012 | | |
| Wolverine | vol. 6 | #1–13 | May 2013 – Mar 2014 | | |
| Wolverine | vol. 7 | #1–12 | Apr 2014 – Oct 2014 | | |
| Wolverine | vol. 7 | Annual #1 | Oct 2014 | | |
| Wolverine | vol. 8 | Annual #1 | Nov 2019 | one-shot | |
| Wolverine | vol. 9 | #1–50 | Apr 2020 – Jul 2024 | | |
| Wolverine | vol. 10 | Annual #1 | Oct 2024 | one-shot | |
| Wolverine | vol. 11 | #1–13 | Nov 2024 – Nov 2025 | | |
| Wolverine | Battlebook: Streets of Fire | | 1998 | one-shot | |
| Wolverine | Black Rio | | Nov 1998 | one-shot | |
| Wolverine | Black, White & Blood | #1–4 | Jan 2021 – May 2021 | limited series | |
| Wolverine | Blood Hunt | #1–4 | Aug 2024 – Sep 2024 | limited series | |
| Wolverine | Bloodlust | #1 | Dec 1990 | one-shot; also known as Wolverine Annual 2: Bloodlust | |
| Wolverine | Chop Shop | #1 | Jan 2009 | one-shot | |
| Wolverine | Dangerous Games | #1 | Aug 2008 | one-shot | |
| Wolverine | Days of Future Past | #1–3 | Dec 1997 – Feb 1998 | limited series | |
| Wolverine | Debt of Death | #1 | Nov 2011 | one-shot | |
| Wolverine | Deep Cut | #1–4 | Sep 2024 – Dec 2024 | limited series | |
| Wolverine | Doombringer | | Nov 1997 | one-shot | |
| Wolverine | Encyclopedia | #1–2 | Nov 1996 – Dec 1996 | limited series | |
| Wolverine | Evilution | | Sep 1994 | one-shot | |
| Wolverine | Exit Wounds | #1 | Jul 2019 | one-shot | |
| Wolverine | Firebreak | #1 | Feb 2008 | one-shot | |
| Wolverine | First Class | #1–21 | May 2008 – Jan 2010 | | |
| Wolverine | Flies to a Spider | #1 | Feb 2009 | one-shot | |
| Wolverine | Global Jeopardy | #1 | Dec 1993 | one-shot | |
| Wolverine | Infinity Watch | #1–5 | Apr 2019 – Aug 2019 | limited series | |
| Wolverine | Inner Fury | | Nov 1992 | one-shot | |
| Wolverine | In The Flesh | #1 | Sep 2013 | one-shot | |
| Wolverine | Judgment Night | #1 | 2000 | one-shot; co-published with Crusade Comics | |
| Wolverine | Killing | | Sep 1993 | one-shot | |
| Wolverine | Killing Made Simple | #1 | Oct 2008 | one-shot | |
| Wolverine | Knight of Terra | #1 | Aug 1995 | one-shot | |
| Wolverine | Madripoor Knights | #1–5 | Apr 2024 – Aug 2024 | limited series | |
| Wolverine | Manifest Destiny | #1–4 | Dec 2008 – Mar 2009 | limited series | |
| Wolverine | Max | #1–15 | Dec 2012 – Mar 2014 | | |
| Wolverine | Mr. X | #1 | May 2010 | one-shot | |
| Wolverine | Netsuke | #1–4 | Nov 2002 – Feb 2003 | limited series | |
| Wolverine | Noir | #1–4 | Jun 2009 – Sep 2009 | limited series | |
| Wolverine | Old Man Logan Giant-Size | #1 | Nov 2009 | one-shot | |
| Wolverine | Paradise | #1– | Dec 2026 – present | | |
| Wolverine | Patch | #1–5 | May 2022 – Oct 2022 | limited series | |
| Wolverine | Rahne of Terra | | Aug 1991 | one-shot | |
| Wolverine | Revenge | #1–5 | Oct 2024 – May 2025 | limited series | |
| Wolverine | Revolver | #1 | Aug 2009 | one-shot | |
| Wolverine | Road to Hell | #1 | Nov 2010 | one-shot | |
| Wolverine | Saudade | #1 | Sep 2008 | one-shot | |
| Wolverine | Savage | #1 | Apr 2010 | one-shot | |
| Wolverine | Save the Tiger | #1 | Jul 1992 | one-shot | |
| Wolverine | Snikt! | #1–5 | Jul 2003 – Nov 2003 | limited series | |
| Wolverine | Soultaker | #1–5 | May 2005 – Aug 2005 | limited series | |
| Wolverine | Switchback | #1 | Mar 2009 | one-shot | |
| Wolverine | The Amazing Immortal Man & Other Bloody Tales | #1 | Jul 2008 | one-shot | |
| Wolverine | The Anniversary | #1 | Jun 2009 | one-shot | |
| Wolverine | The Best There Is | #1–12 | Feb 2011 – Jan 2012 | | |
| Wolverine | The End | #1–6 | Jan 2004 – Dec 2004 | limited series | |
| Wolverine | The Jungle Adventure | | 1990 | one-shot | |
| Wolverine | The Long Night Adaptation | #1–5 | Mar 2019 – Jul 2019 | limited series; based on the Wolverine podcast | |
| Wolverine | The Origin | #1–6 | Nov 2001 – Jul 2002 | limited series | |
| Wolverine | Under the Boardwalk | #1 | Feb 2010 | one-shot | |
| Wolverine | Weapon X | #1–16 | Jun 2009 – Oct 2010 | | |
| Wolverine | Weapon X Files | | Jun 2009 | one-shot | |
| Wolverine | Weapons of Armageddon | #1–4 | Apr 2026 – Jul 2026 | limited series | |
| Wolverine | Wendigo! | #1 | Mar 2010 | one-shot | |
| Wolverine | Xisle | #1–5 | Jun 2003 | limited series | |
| Wolverine/ | Cable | #1 | Oct 1999 | one-shot | |
| Wolverine/ | Captain America | #1–4 | Apr 2004 | limited series | |
| Wolverine/ | Deadpool: The Decoy | #1 | Sep 2011 | one-shot | |
| Wolverine/ | Doop | #1–2 | Jul 2003 | limited series | |
| Wolverine/ | Gambit: Victims | #1–4 | Sep 1995 – Dec 1995 | limited series | |
| Wolverine/ | Hercules: Myths, Monsters & Mutants | #1–4 | May 2011 – Aug 2011 | limited series | |
| Wolverine/ | Hulk | #1–4 | Apr 2002 – Jul 2002 | limited series | |
| Wolverine/ | Punisher | #1–5 | May 2004 – Sep 2004 | limited series | |
| Wolverine/ | Punisher: Revelation | #1–4 | Jun 1999 – Sep 1999 | limited series | |
| Wolverine/ | Shi: Dark Night of Judgment | #1 | Jan 1999 | one-shot; co-published with Crusade Comics | |
| Wolverine/ | Witchblade | #1 | Mar 1997 | one-shot; co-published with Top Cow Productions and Image Comics | |
| Wolverine/ | X-Men Special Edition Magazine | #1 | 2008 | one-shot | |
| Wolverine and (&) | Black Cat: Claws 2 | #1–3 | Aug 2011 – Nov 2011 | limited series | |
| Wolverine and (&) | Captain America: Weapon Plus | #1 | Sep 2019 | one-shot | |
| Wolverine and (&) | Jubilee | #1–4 | Mar 2011 – Jun 2011 | limited series | |
| Wolverine and (&) | Kitty Pryde | #1–5 | Jun 2025 – Oct 2025 | limited series | |
| Wolverine and (&) | Power Pack | #1–4 | Jan 2009 – Apr 2009 | limited series | |
| Wolverine and (&) | The Punisher: Damaging Evidence | #1–3 | Oct 1993 – Dec 1993 | limited series | |
| Wolverine and (&) the X-Men | vol. 1 | #1–42 #27AU | Dec 2011 – Apr 2014 | | |
| Wolverine and (&) the X-Men | vol. 1 | Annual #1 | Jan 2014 | | |
| Wolverine and (&) the X-Men | vol. 2 | #1–12 | May 2014 – Jan 2015 | | |
| Wolverine and (&) the X-Men | Alpha and Omega | #1–5 | Mar 2012 – Jul 2012 | limited series | |
| Wolverine by Chris Claremont | | #1 | Oct 2025 | one-shot | |
| Wolverine: Origins | | #1–50 | Jun 2006 – Sep 2010 | | |
| Wolverine: Origins | | Annual #1 | Sep 2007 | | |
| The Wolverine Saga | vol. 1 | #1–4 | Sep 1989 – Dec 1989 | limited series | |
| The Wolverine Saga | vol. 2 | #1 | Mar 2009 | one-shot | |
| Wolverine vs. Blade Special | | #1 | Sep 2019 | one-shot | |
| Wolverines | | #1–20 | Mar 2015 – Nov 2015 | | |
| Wolverines & Deadpools | | #1–3 | Sep 2025 – Nov 2025 | limited series | |
| Women of Marvel | vol. 1 | #1–2 | Jan 2011 – Feb 2011 | limited series | |
| Women of Marvel | vol. 2 | #1 | Jun 2021 | one-shot | |
| Women of Marvel | vol. 3 | #1 | May 2022 | one-shot | |
| Women of Marvel | vol. 4 | #1 | May 2023 | one-shot | |
| Women of Marvel | vol. 5 | #1 | Apr 2024 | one-shot | |
| Women of Marvel | She-Devils | #1 | Apr 2025 | one-shot | |
| Wonder Man | vol. 1 | #1 | Mar 1986 | one-shot | |
| Wonder Man | vol. 2 | #1–29 | Sep 1991 – Jan 1994 | | |
| Wonder Man | vol. 2 | Annual #1–2 | 1992 – 1993 | | |
| Wonder Man | vol. 3 | #1–5 | Feb 2007 – Jun 2007 | limited series | |
| Wonder Man | vol. 4 | #1–5 | Jun 2026 – Sep 2026 | limited series | |
| The Wonderful Wizard of Oz | | #1–8 | Feb 2009 – Sep 2009 | limited series | |
| Woodstock | | #1 | 1994 | one-shot | |
| World of Revelation | | #1 | Dec 2025 | one-shot; Age of Revelation tie-in | |
| World War Hulk | | #1–5 | Aug 2007 – Jan 2008 | limited series | |
| World War Hulk | Aftersmash | #1 | Jan 2008 | one-shot | |
| World War Hulk | Front Line | #1–6 | Aug 2007 – Dec 2007 | limited series | |
| World War Hulk | Gamma Corps | #1–4 | Sep 2007 – Jan 2008 | limited series | |
| World War Hulk | Gamma Files | #1 | Aug 2007 | one-shot | |
| World War Hulk | Prologue: World Breaker | #1 | Jul 2007 | one-shot | |
| World War Hulk | X-Men | #1–3 | Aug 2007 – Oct 2007 | limited series | |
| World War Hulks | | #1 | Jun 2010 | one-shot | |
| World War Hulks | Hulked-Out Heroes | #1–2 | Jun 2010 – Jul 2010 | limited series | |
| World War Hulks | Spider-Man vs. Thor | #1–2 | Sep 2010 | limited series; also known as World War Hulks: Spider-Man & Thor | |
| World War Hulks | Wolverine vs. Captain America | #1–2 | Sep 2010 | limited series; also known as World War Hulks: Captain America vs. Wolverine and World War Hulks: Wolverine & Captain America | |
| Worlds Unknown | | #1–8 | May 1973 – Aug 1974 | | |
| WWH Aftersmash | Damage Control | #1–3 | Mar 2008 – May 2008 | limited series | |
| WWH Aftersmash | Warbound | #1–5 | Feb 2008 – Jun 2008 | limited series | |
| Wyatt Earp | vol. 2 | #30–34 | Oct 1972 – Jun 1973 | vol. 1 published by Atlas Comics numbering continued from vol. 1 | |
| Wyrms | | #1–6 | Feb 2007 – Aug 2007 | limited series | |

== X ==
| Title | Series | Issues | Dates | Notes | Reference |
|---|---|---|---|---|---|
| X-23 | vol. 1 | #1–6 | Mar 2005 – Jun 2005 | limited series | |
| X-23 | vol. 2 | #1 | May 2010 | one-shot | |
| X-23 | vol. 3 | #1–21 | Nov 2010 – May 2012 | | |
| X-23 | vol. 4 | #1–12 | Sep 2018 – Jul 2019 | | |
| X-23 | Deadly Regenesis | #1–5 | May 2023 – Sep 2023 | limited series | |
| X-23 | Target X | #1–6 | Feb 2007 – Jul 2007 | limited series | |
| X-51 | | #1–12 | Sep 1999 – Jul 2000 | | |
| X-Babies | | #1–4 | Dec 2009 – Mar 2010 | limited series | |
| X-Babies | Murderama | #1 | Aug 1998 | one-shot | |
| X-Babies | Reborn | #1 | Jan 2000 | one-shot | |
| X-Calibre | | #1–4 | Mar 1995 – Jun 1995 | limited series; Age of Apocalypse (1995) tie-in | |
| X-Campus | | #1–4 | Jul 2010 – Nov 2010 | limited series | |
| X-Cellent | vol. 1 | #1–5 | Apr 2022 – Sep 2022 | | |
| X-Cellent | vol. 2 | #1–5 | May 2023 – Sep 2023 | limited series; titled The X-Cellent | |
| X-Club | | #1–5 | Feb 2012 – Jun 2012 | limited series | |
| X-Corp | | #1–5 | Jul 2021 – Nov 2021 | | |
| X Deaths of Wolverine | | #1–5 | Mar 2022 – May 2022 | limited series | |
| X-Factor | vol. 1 | #1–149 -1 | Feb 1986 – Sep 1998 | | |
| X-Factor | vol. 1 | Annual #1–9 | 1986 – 1994 | | |
| X-Factor | vol. 2 | #1–4 | Jun 2002 – Oct 2002 | limited series | |
| X-Factor | vol. 3 | #1–50; 200–262; 224.1 | Jan 2006 – Nov 2013 | renumbered after #50 to #200 | |
| X-Factor | vol. 4 | #1–10 | Sep 2020 – Aug 2021 | | |
| X-Factor | vol. 5 | #1–10 | Oct 2024 – Jul 2025 | | |
| X-Factor | Forever | #1–5 | May 2010 – Sep 2010 | limited series | |
| X-Factor | Prisoner of Love | | 1990 | one-shot | |
| X-Factor | Special: Layla Miller | #1 | Oct 2008 | one-shot | |
| X-Factor | The Quick and the Dead | #1 | Jul 2008 | one-shot | |
| X-Force | vol. 1 | #1–129 -1 | Aug 1991 – Aug 2002 | | |
| X-Force | vol. 1 | Annual #1–3 | 1992 – 1994 | | |
| X-Force | vol. 1 | X-Force and Cable '95 | 1995 | Annual | |
| X-Force | vol. 1 | X-Force and Cable '96 | 1996 | Annual | |
| X-Force | vol. 1 | X-Force/Cable '97 | 1997 | Annual | |
| X-Force | vol. 1 | X-Force/Champions '98 | 1998 | Annual | |
| X-Force | vol. 1 | 1999 | 1999 | Annual | |
| X-Force | vol. 2 | #1–6 | Oct 2004 – Mar 2005 | | |
| X-Force | vol. 3 | #1–28 | Apr 2008 – Sep 2010 | | |
| X-Force | vol. 3 | Annual #1 | Feb 2010 | | |
| X-Force | vol. 3 | Special: Ain't No Dog #1 | Aug 2008 | | |
| X-Force | vol. 4 | #1–15 | Apr 2014 – Apr 2015 | | |
| X-Force | vol. 5 | #1–10 | Feb 2019 – Sep 2019 | | |
| X-Force | vol. 6 | #1–50 | Jan 2020 – May 2024 | | |
| X-Force | vol. 6 | Annual #1 | 2022 | | |
| X-Force | vol. 7 | #1–10 | Sep 2024 – Jun 2025 | | |
| X-Force | Killshot Anniversary Special | #1 | Jan 2022 | one-shot | |
| X-Force | Sex and Violence | #1–3 | Sep 2010 – Nov 2010 | limited series | |
| X-Force | Shatterstar | #1–4 | Apr 2005 – Jul 2005 | limited series | |
| X-Force/Cable: Messiah War | | #1 | May 2009 | one-shot | |
| X-Force/Youngblood | | #1 | Aug 1996 | one-shot; co-published with Image Comics | |
| X-Infernus | | #1–4 | Feb 2009 – May 2009 | limited series | |
| X Lives of Wolverine | | #1–5 | Mar 2022 – May 2022 | limited series | |
| X-Man | | #1–76 -1 | Mar 1995 – May 2001 | Age of Apocalypse (1995) tie-in initially; continued as on-going series | |
| X-Man | | '96, '97 | 1996 – 1997 | Annuals | |
| X-Man | | X-Man/Hulk ’98 | 1998 | Annual | |
| X-Man | All Saints Day | #1 | 1997 | one-shot | |
| X-Manhunt Omega | | #1 | May 2025 | one-shot | |
| X-Men | vol. 1 | #1–141 | Sep 1963 – Jan 1981 | titled The X-Men; continued as Uncanny X-Men vol. 1 | |
| X-Men | vol. 1 | Annual #1–4 | Dec 1970 – Nov 1980 | continued as Uncanny X-Men Annual | |
| X-Men | vol. 1 | Giant-Size #1–2 | 1975 | | |
| X-Men | vol. 2 | #1–113 -1 | Oct 1991 – Jun 2001 | continued as New X-Men vol. 1 for issues #114–156 | |
| X-Men | vol. 2 | #157–207 | Jul 2004 – Mar 2008 | continued as X-Men: Legacy from issue #208 | |
| X-Men | vol. 2 | Annual #1–3 | 1992 – 1994 | | |
| X-Men | vol. 2 | '95, '96, '97 | 1995 – 1997 | Annuals | |
| X-Men | vol. 2 | X-Men/Dr. Doom '98 | 1998 | Annual | |
| X-Men | vol. 2 | 1999, 2000 | 1999 – 2000 | Annuals | |
| X-Men | vol. 2 | Annual (vol. 2) #1 | Mar 2007 | | |
| X-Men | vol. 2 | Giant-Size #3–4 | 2005 – 2006 | | |
| X-Men | vol. 3 | #1–41; 15.1 | Sep 2010 – Apr 2013 | | |
| X-Men | vol. 3 | Giant-Size #1 | Jul 2011 | | |
| X-Men | vol. 4 | #1–26 | Jul 2013 – Jun 2015 | | |
| X-Men | vol. 5 | #1–21 | Dec 2019 – Aug 2021 | | |
| X-Men | vol. 6 | #1–35 | Sep 2021 – Aug 2024 | | |
| X-Men | vol. 6 | Annual #1 | 2022 | | |
| X-Men | vol. 6 | Annual #1 | 2023 | 2nd Annual #1 published in this volume | |
| X-Men | vol. 7 | #1– | Sep 2024 – present | | |
| X-Men | vol. 7 | Annual #1 | 2026 | | |
| X-Men | Alpha | #1 | Feb 1995 | one-shot; Age of Apocalypse (1995) tie-in | |
| X-Men | Animation Special | | Dec 1990 | graphic novel; published under the Marvel Graphic Novel imprint | |
| X-Men | Anniversary Magazine | #1 | Sep 1993 | one-shot | |
| X-Men | Apocalypse/Dracula | #1–4 | Apr 2006 – Jul 2006 | limited series; also known as X-Men: Apocalypse vs. Dracula | |
| X-Men | Battle of the Atom | #1–2 | Nov 2013 – Dec 2013 | limited series | |
| X-Men | Black Sun | #1–5 | Nov 2000 | limited series | |
| X-Men | Blind Science | #1 | Jul 2010 | one-shot | |
| X-Men | Book of Revelation | #1–3 | Dec 2025 – Feb 2026 | limited series; Age of Revelation tie-in | |
| X-Men | Books of Askani | #1 | 1995 | one-shot | |
| X-Men | Children of the Atom | #1–6 | Nov 1999 – Sep 2000 | limited series | |
| X-Men | Chronicles | #1–2 | Mar 1995 – Jun 1995 | limited series; Age of Apocalypse (1995) tie-in | |
| X-Men | ClanDestine | #1–2 | Oct 1996 – Nov 1996 | limited series; also known as X-Men: Clan Destine | |
| X-Men | Classic | #46–110 | Apr 1990 – Aug 1995 | continued from Classic X-Men | |
| X-Men | Classics | #1–3 | Dec 1983 – Feb 1984 | | |
| X-Men | Colossus: Bloodline | #1–5 | Nov 2005 – Mar 2006 | limited series | |
| X-Men | Days Of Future Past - Doomsday | #1–4 | Sep 2023 – Dec 2023 | limited series | |
| X-Men | Deadly Genesis | #1–6 | Jan 2006 – Jul 2006 | limited series | |
| X-Men | Declassified | #1 | Oct 2000 | one-shot | |
| X-Men | Die by the Sword | #1–5 | Dec 2007 – Feb 2008 | limited series | |
| X-Men | Divided We Stand | #1–2 | Jun 2008 – Jul 2008 | limited series | |
| X-Men | Earth's Mutant Heroes | #1 | Jul 2011 | one-shot | |
| X-Men | Emperor Vulcan | #1–5 | Nov 2007 – Mar 2008 | limited series | |
| X-Men | Endangered Species | #1 | Aug 2007 | one-shot | |
| X-Men | Evolution | #1–9 | Feb 2002 – Sep 2002 | based on the TV series | |
| X-Men | Evolutions | #1 | Dec 2011 | one-shot | |
| X-Men | Fairy Tales | #1–4 | Jul 2006 – Oct 2006 | limited series | |
| X-Men | Forever | #1–4 | May 2024 – Jul 2024 | limited series | |
| X-Men | From the Ashes: Demons and Death | #1 | Aug 2025 | one-shot | |
| X-Men | Future History - The Messiah War Sourcebook | #1 | Jul 2009 | one-shot | |
| X-Men | God Loves, Man Kills Extended Cut | #1–2 | Sep 2020 – Oct 2020 | limited series | |
| X-Men | Heir of Apocalypse | #1–4 | Aug 2024 – Sep 2024 | biweekly limited series | |
| X-Men | Hellbound | #1–3 | Jul 2010 – Sep 2010 | limited series | |
| X-Men | Hellfire Club | #1–4 | Jan 2000 – Apr 2000 | limited series | |
| X-Men | Hellfire Vigil | #1 | Sep 2025 | one-shot | |
| X-Men | Hope | #1 | May 2010 | one-shot | |
| X-Men | Kingbreaker | #1–4 | Feb 2009 – May 2009 | limited series; War of Kings tie-in | |
| X-Men | Kitty Pryde - Shadow & Flame | #1–5 | Aug 2005 – Dec 2005 | limited series | |
| X-Men | Liberators | #1–4 | Nov 1998 – Feb 1999 | limited series | |
| X-Men | Lost Tales | #1–2 | Apr 1997 – May 1997 | limited series | |
| X-Men | Magneto Testament | #1–5 | Nov 2008 – Mar 2009 | limited series | |
| X-Men | Magneto War | #1 | Mar 1999 | one-shot | |
| X-Men | Millennial Visions | #1–2 | Aug 2000 – Jan 2002 | limited series | |
| X-Men | No More Humans | | 2014 | graphic novel | |
| X-Men | Odd Men Out | | Sep 2008 | one-shot | |
| X-Men | Omega | #1 | Jun 1995 | one-shot; Age of Apocalypse (1995) tie-in | |
| X-Men | Omega Red Dawn | #1 | Nov 2026 | one-shot | |
| X-Men | Onslaught Revelation | #1 | Nov 2021 | one-shot | |
| X-Men | Original Sin | #1 | Dec 2008 | one-shot | |
| X-Men | Outback | #1–5 | Aug 2026 – Dec 2026 | limited series | |
| X-Men | Phoenix Force Handbook | | Sep 2010 | one-shot | |
| X-Men | Pixie Strikes Back | #1–4 | Apr 2010 – Jul 2010 | limited series | |
| X-Men | Pixies and Demons - Director's Cut | #1 | Dec 2008 | one-shot | |
| X-Men | Prelude to Perdition | #1 | Jan 1995 | one-shot | |
| X-Men | Prelude to Schism | #1–4 | Jul 2011 – Aug 2011 | limited series | |
| X-Men | Regenesis | #1 | Dec 2011 | one-shot | |
| X-Men | Road to Onslaught | #1 | Oct 1996 | one-shot | |
| X-Men | Ronin | #1–5 | May 2003 – Jul 2003 | limited series | |
| X-Men | Schism | #1–5 | Sep 2011 – Jan 2012 | limited series | |
| X-Men | Second Coming | #1–2 | May 2010 – Sep 2010 | limited series | |
| X-Men | Spotlight | | Jul 2011 | one-shot | |
| X-Men | Survival Guide to the Mansion | #1 | Aug 1993 | one-shot | |
| X-Men | Sword of the Braddocks | #1 | May 2009 | one-shot | |
| X-Men | Tales from the Age of Apocalypse | #1 | Jan 2026 | one-shot | |
| X-Men | The 198 | #1–5 | Mar 2006 – Jul 2006 | limited series; Decimation tie-in | |
| X-Men | The 198 Files | #1 | Mar 2006 | one-shot | |
| X-Men | The Early Years | #1–17 | May 1994 – Sep 1995 | | |
| X-Men | The Exterminated | #1 | Feb 2019 | one-shot | |
| X-Men | The Hellfire Murder | #1 | Sep 2026 | one-shot | |
| X-Men | The Hidden Years | #1–22 | Dec 1999 – Sep 2001 | | |
| X-Men | The Manga | #1–26 | Mar 1998 – Apr 1999 | | |
| X-Men | The Search for Cyclops | #1–4 | Oct 2000 – Mar 2001 | limited series | |
| X-Men | The Times and Life of Lucas Bishop | #1–3 | Apr 2009 – Jun 2009 | limited series | |
| X-Men | The Trial of Magneto | #1–5 | Oct 2021 – Feb 2022 | limited series | |
| X-Men | The Ultra Collection | #1–5 | Dec 1994 – Apr 1995 | limited series | |
| X-Men | The Undertow | #1 | Dec 2025 | one-shot | |
| X-Men | The Wedding Album | #1 | Mar 1994 | one-shot | |
| X-Men | To Serve and Protect | #1–4 | Jan 2011 – Apr 2011 | limited series | |
| X-Men | Tooth and Claw | #1 | Oct 2025 | one-shot | |
| X-Men | True Friends | #1–3 | Sep 1999 – Nov 1999 | limited series | |
| X-Men | Ultra III Preview | #1 | Nov 1995 | one-shot | |
| X-Men | United | #1– | May 2026 – present | | |
| X-Men | Worlds Apart | #1–4 | Dec 2008 – Mar 2009 | limited series | |
| X-Men | Worst X-Man Ever | #1–5 | Apr 2016 – Aug 2016 | limited series | |
| X-Men | Xavier's Secret | #1 | Mar 2025 | one-shot | |
| X-Men | Year of the Mutants Collectors' Preview | #1 | Feb 1995 | one-shot | |
| X-Men | Yearbook 1999 | #1 | Feb 2000 | one-shot | |
| X-Men/ | Alpha Flight vol. 1 | #1–2 | Dec 1985 – Jan 1986 | limited series | |
| X-Men/ | Alpha Flight vol. 2 | #1–2 | May 1998 – Jun 1998 | limited series | |
| X-Men/ | Fantastic Four vol. 1 | #1–5 | Feb 2005 – Jun 2005 | limited series | |
| X-Men/ | Fantastic Four vol. 2 | #1–4 | Apr 2020 – Sep 2020 | limited series | |
| X-Men/ | Spider-Man | #1–4 | Jan 2009 – Apr 2009 | limited series | |
| X-Men/ | WildC.A.T.s: The Dark Age | #1 | May 1998 | one-shot; co-published with Image Comics | |
| X-Men 2 | | #1 | Jun 2003 | one-shot; movie adaptation | |
| X-Men 2 | Prequel: Nightcrawler | #1 | May 2003 | one-shot; movie prequel | |
| X-Men 2 | Prequel: Wolverine | #1 | May 2003 | one-shot; movie prequel | |
| X-Men '92 | vol. 1 | #1–4 | Aug 2015 – Nov 2015 | limited series; Secret Wars (2015) tie-in; based on the 1992 TV series | |
| X-Men '92 | vol. 2 | #1–10 | May 2016 – Feb 2017 | based on the 1992 TV series | |
| X-Men '92 | House of XCII | #1–5 | Jun 2022 – Nov 2022 | limited series | |
| X-Men '97 | | #1–4 | May 2024 – Aug 2024 | limited series; prelude to the Disney+ series | |
| X-Men '97 | Season Two | #1–5 | Aug 2026 – Dec 2026 | limited series | |
| X-Men 2099 | | #1–35 | Oct 1993 – Aug 1996 | | |
| X-Men 2099 | | Special #1 | Oct 1995 | | |
| X-Men 2099 | Oasis | #1 | Aug 1996 | one-shot | |
| X-Men Adventures | vol. 1 | #1–15 | Nov 1992 – Jan 1994 | based on the 1992 TV series | |
| X-Men Adventures | vol. 2 (II) | #1–13 | Feb 1994 – Feb 1995 | limited series | |
| X-Men Adventures | vol. 3 (III) | #1–13 | Mar 1995 – Mar 1996 | limited series | |
| X-Men: Age of Apocalypse | vol. 1 | #1 | May 2005 | one-shot | |
| X-Men: Age of Apocalypse | vol. 2 | #1–6 | May 2005 – Jun 2005 | limited series | |
| X-Men: Age of Revelation | | #0 | Sep 2025 | one-shot | |
| X-Men: Age of Revelation | Finale | #1 | Feb 2026 | one-shot | |
| X-Men: Age of Revelation | Overture | #1 | Dec 2025 | one-shot | |
| X-Men and | Captain Universe: Sleeping Giants | #1 | Dec 1994 | one-shot; mail-order exclusive | |
| X-Men and | Power Pack | #1–4 | Dec 2005 – Mar 2006 | limited series | |
| X-Men and | The Micronauts | #1–4 | Jan 1984 – Apr 1984 | limited series | |
| X-Men: Before the Fall | Heralds of Apocalypse | #1 | Aug 2023 | one-shot | |
| X-Men: Before the Fall | Mutant First Strike | #1 | Aug 2023 | one-shot | |
| X-Men: Before the Fall | Sinister Four | #1 | Sep 2023 | one-shot | |
| X-Men: Before the Fall | Sons of X | #1 | Jul 2023 | one-shot | |
| X-Men: Black | Emma Frost | #1 | Dec 2018 | one-shot | |
| X-Men: Black | Juggernaut | #1 | Dec 2018 | one-shot | |
| X-Men: Black | Magneto | #1 | Dec 2018 | one-shot | |
| X-Men: Black | Mojo | #1 | Dec 2018 | one-shot | |
| X-Men: Black | Mystique | #1 | Dec 2018 | one-shot | |
| X-Men: Blood Hunt | Jubilee | #1 | Aug 2024 | one-shot | |
| X-Men: Blood Hunt | Laura Kinney The Wolverine | #1 | Sep 2024 | one-shot | |
| X-Men: Blood Hunt | Magik | #1 | Aug 2024 | one-shot | |
| X-Men: Blood Hunt | Psylocke | #1 | Sep 2024 | one-shot | |
| X-Men Blue | | #1–36 | Jun 2017 – Nov 2018 | | |
| X-Men Blue | | Annual #1 | Mar 2018 | | |
| X-Men Blue | Origins | #1 | Jan 2024 | one-shot | |
| X-Men by Chris Claremont: Prelude to a Future Past | | #1 | Sep 2025 | one-shot | |
| X-Men: Curse of the Mutants | Blade | #1 | Oct 2010 | one-shot | |
| X-Men: Curse of the Mutants | Saga | #1 | Aug 2010 | one-shot | |
| X-Men: Curse of the Mutants | Smoke and Blood | #1 | Nov 2011 | one-shot | |
| X-Men: Curse of the Mutants | Spotlight | #1 | Jan 2011 | one-shot | |
| X-Men: Curse of the Mutants | Storm & Gambit | #1 | Oct 2010 | one-shot | |
| X-Men: Curse of the Mutants | X-Men vs. Vampires | #1–2 | Nov 2010 – Dec 2010 | limited series | |
| X-Men First Class | vol. 1 | #1–8 | Nov 2006 – Jun 2007 | limited series | |
| X-Men First Class | vol. 1 | Special #1 | Jul 2007 | | |
| X-Men First Class | vol. 2 | #1–16 | Aug 2007 – Nov 2008 | | |
| X-Men First Class | vol. 2 | Giant-Size #1 | Dec 2008 | | |
| X-Men First Class | Finals | #1–4 | Apr 2009 – Jul 2009 | limited series | |
| X-Men Forever | vol. 1 | #1–6 | Jan 2001 – Jun 2001 | limited series | |
| X-Men Forever | vol. 2 | #1–24 | Aug 2009 – Jul 2010 | | |
| X-Men Forever | vol. 2 | Annual #1 | Jun 2010 | | |
| X-Men Forever | vol. 2 | Giant-Size #1 | Jul 2010 | | |
| X-Men Forever | 2 | #1–16 | Aug 2010 – Mar 2011 | | |
| X-Men Forever | Alpha | #1 | Jul 2009 | one-shot | |
| X-Men Gold | vol. 1 | #1 | Jan 2014 | one-shot | |
| X-Men Gold | vol. 2 | #1–36 | Jun 2017 – Nov 2018 | | |
| X-Men Gold | vol. 2 | Annual #1–2 | Mar 2018 – Oct 2018 | | |
| X-Men: Grand Design | | #1–2 | Feb 2018 – Mar 2018 | limited series | |
| X-Men: Grand Design | Second Genesis | #1–2 | Sep 2018 – Oct 2018 | limited series | |
| X-Men: Grand Design | X-Tinction | #1–2 | Jul 2019 – Aug 2019 | limited series | |
| X-Men: Hellfire Gala | | #1 | Sep 2022 | one-shot | |
| X-Men: Hellfire Gala | 2023 | #1 | Sep 2023 | one-shot | |
| X-Men Legacy | vol. 1 | #208–275 260.1 | Apr 2008 – Dec 2012 | continued from X-Men vol. 2 | |
| X-Men Legacy | vol. 1 | Annual #1 | 2009 | | |
| X-Men Legacy | vol. 2 | #1–24; 300 | Jan 2013 – May 2014 | renumbered after #24 to #300 | |
| X-Men Legends | vol. 1 | #1–12 | Apr 2021 – May 2022 | | |
| X-Men Legends | vol. 2 | #1–6 | Oct 2022 – Apr 2023 | | |
| X-Men: Manifest Destiny | | #1–5 | Nov 2008 – Mar 2009 | limited series | |
| X-Men: Manifest Destiny | Nightcrawler | #1 | May 2009 | one-shot | |
| X-Men: Messiah Complex | | #1 | Dec 2007 | one-shot | |
| X-Men: Messiah Complex | Mutant Files | | Dec 2007 | one-shot | |
| X-Men Movie | Adaptation | #1 | Sep 2000 | one-shot; movie adaptation | |
| X-Men Movie | Prequel: Magneto | #1 | Aug 2000 | one-shot; movie prequel | |
| X-Men Movie | Prequel: Rogue | #1 | Aug 2000 | one-shot; movie prequel | |
| X-Men Movie | Prequel: Wolverine | #1 | Aug 2000 | one-shot; movie prequel | |
| X-Men Noir | | #1–4 | Feb 2009 – May 2009 | limited series | |
| X-Men Noir | Mark of Cain | #1–4 | Feb 2010 – May 2010 | limited series | |
| X-Men of Apocalypse | | #1–4 | Jan 2026 – Aug 2026 | limited series | |
| X-Men of Apocalypse | Alpha | #1 | Nov 2025 | one-shot | |
| X-Men of Apocalypse | Omega | #1 | Oct 2026 | one-shot | |
| X-Men Origins | Beast | #1 | Nov 2008 | one-shot | |
| X-Men Origins | Colossus | #1 | Jul 2008 | one-shot | |
| X-Men Origins | Cyclops | #1 | Mar 2010 | one-shot | |
| X-Men Origins | Deadpool | #1 | Sep 2010 | one-shot | |
| X-Men Origins | Emma Frost | #1 | Jul 2010 | one-shot | |
| X-Men Origins | Gambit | #1 | Aug 2009 | one-shot | |
| X-Men Origins | Iceman | #1 | Jan 2010 | one-shot | |
| X-Men Origins | Jean Grey | #1 | Oct 2008 | one-shot | |
| X-Men Origins | Nightcrawler | #1 | May 2010 | one-shot | |
| X-Men Origins | Sabretooth | #1 | Apr 2009 | one-shot | |
| X-Men Origins | Wolverine | #1 | Jun 2009 | one-shot | |
| X-Men: Phoenix | | #1–3 | Dec 1999 – Mar 2000 | limited series | |
| X-Men: Phoenix | Endsong | #1–5 | Mar 2005 – Jun 2005 | limited series | |
| X-Men: Phoenix | Legacy of Fire | #1–3 | Jul 2003 – Sep 2003 | limited series | |
| X-Men: Phoenix | Warsong | #1–5 | Nov 2006 – Mar 2007 | limited series | |
| X-Men Prime | vol. 1 | #1 | Jul 1995 | one-shot; Age of Apocalypse (1995) tie-in | |
| X-Men Prime | vol. 2 | #1 | May 2017 | one-shot | |
| X-Men Red | vol. 1 | #1–11 | Apr 2018 – Feb 2019 | | |
| X-Men Red | vol. 1 | Annual #1 | Jul 2018 | | |
| X-Men Red | vol. 2 | #1–18 | Jun 2022 – Feb 2024 | | |
| X-Men Spotlight on... Starjammers | | #1–2 | May 1990 – Jun 1990 | limited series | |
| X-Men: The End | vol. 1 | #1–6 | Oct 2004 – Feb 2005 | limited series; also known as X-Men: The End: Book 1: Dreamers & Demons | |
| X-Men: The End | vol. 2 | #1–6 | May 2005 – Oct 2005 | limited series; also known as X-Men: The End: Book 2: Heroes & Martyrs | |
| X-Men: The End | vol. 3 | #1–6 | Mar 2006 – Aug 2006 | limited series; also known as X-Men: The End: Book 3: Men & X-Men | |
| X-Men: The Wedding Special | vol. 1 | #1 | Jul 2018 | one-shot | |
| X-Men: The Wedding Special | vol. 2 | #1 | Jul 2024 | one-shot | |
| X-Men Universe | | #1–15 | Dec 1999 – Feb 2001 | | |
| X-Men Universe | Past, Present and Future | #1 | Feb 1999 | one-shot | |
| X-Men Unlimited | vol. 1 | #1–50 | Jun 1993 – Sep 2003 | | |
| X-Men Unlimited | vol. 2 | #1–14 | Apr 2004 – Jun 2006 | | |
| X-Men Unlimited | Latitude | #1 | May 2022 | one-shot | |
| X-Men Unlimited | X-Men Green | #1–2 | Oct 2022 – Nov 2022 | limited series | |
| X-Men vs. | Agents of Atlas | #1–2 | Dec 2009 – Jan 2010 | limited series | |
| X-Men vs. | Dracula | #1 | Dec 1993 | one-shot | |
| X-Men vs. | Hulk | #1 | Mar 2009 | one-shot | |
| X-Men vs. | The Avengers | #1–4 | Apr 1987 – Jul 1987 | limited series | |
| X-Men vs. | The Brood | #1–2 | Sep 1996 – Oct 1996 | limited series | |
| X-Nation 2099 | | #1–6 | Mar 1996 – Aug 1996 | limited series | |
| X Necrosha | | #1 | Dec 2009 | one-shot | |
| X Necrosha | The Gathering | #1 | Feb 2010 | one-shot | |
| X-O Manowar/Iron Man: In Heavy Metal | | #1 | Sep 1996 | one-shot; co-published with Valiant Comics; based on the video game | |
| X-Orcists | | #1–5 | Jan 2027 – present | limited series | |
| X of Swords | Creation | #1 | Nov 2020 | one-shot | |
| X of Swords | Destruction | #1 | Jan 2021 | one-shot | |
| X of Swords | Handbook | #1 | Dec 2020 | one-shot | |
| X of Swords | Stasis | #1 | Dec 2020 | one-shot | |
| X-Patrol | | #1 | Apr 1996 | One-shot; published under the Amalgam Comics imprint in association with DC | |
| X-Statix | vol. 1 | #1–26 | Sep 2002 – Oct 2004 | | |
| X-Statix | Giant-Size | #1 | Sep 2019 | one-shot | |
| X-Statix Presents: Dead Girl | | #1–5 | Mar 2006 – Jul 2006 | limited series | |
| X-Termination | | #1–2 | May 2013 – Jun 2013 | limited series | |
| X-Terminators | vol. 1 | #1–4 | Oct 1988 – Jan 1989 | limited series | |
| X-Terminators | vol. 2 | #1–5 | Nov 2022 – Mar 2023 | limited series | |
| X-Tinction Agenda | | #1–4 | Aug 2015 – Nov 2015 | limited series; Secret Wars (2015) tie-in | |
| X-Treme X-Men | vol. 1 | #1–46 | Jul 2001 – Jun 2004 | | |
| X-Treme X-Men | vol. 1 | Annual 2001 | 2001 | | |
| X-Treme X-Men | vol. 2 | #1–13 | Sep 2012 – Jun 2013 | | |
| X-Treme X-Men | vol. 3 | #1–5 | Feb 2023 – Jun 2023 | limited series | |
| X-Treme X-Men | Savage Land | #1–4 | Nov 2001 – Feb 2002 | limited series | |
| X-Treme X-Pose | | #1–2 | Jan 2003 – Feb 2003 | limited series | |
| X-Universe | | #1–2 | May 1995 – Jun 1995 | limited series; Age of Apocalypse (1995) tie-in | |
| X-Vengers | | #1–3 | Dec 2025 – Feb 2026 | limited series; Age of Revelation tie-in | |
| X-Women | | #1 | Sep 2010 | one-shot | |
| Xavier Institute Alumni Yearbook | | #1 | Dec 1996 | one-shot | |
| XSE | | #1–4 | Nov 1996 – Feb 1997 | limited series | |

== Y ==
| Title | Series | Issues | Dates | Notes | Reference |
|---|---|---|---|---|---|
| Year in Review: Spider-Man | | #1 | Feb 2000 | one-shot; also known as Peter & Mary Jane's Spider-Man Scrapbook | |
| A Year of Marvels | The Amazing | #1 | Jun 2016 | one-shot; part one of five | |
| A Year of Marvels | The Incredible | #1 | Aug 2016 | one-shot; part two of five | |
| A Year of Marvels | The Unbeatable | #1 | Dec 2016 | one-shot; part four of five | |
| A Year of Marvels | The Uncanny | #1 | Feb 2017 | one-shot; part five of five | |
| A Year of Marvels | The Unstoppable | #1 | Oct 2016 | one-shot; part three of five | |
| Years of Future Past | | #1–5 | Aug 2015 – Dec 2015 | limited series; Secret Wars (2015) tie-in | |
| Yogi Bear | | #1–9 | Nov 1977 – Mar 1979 | | |
| Yondu | | #1–5 | Jan 2020 – Apr 2020 | limited series | |
| You Are Deadpool | | #1–5 | Jul 2018 | limited series | |
| Young Allies | vol. 2 | #1–6 | Aug 2010 – Jan 2011 | vol. 1 was published by Timely Comics | |
| Young Allies | 70th Anniversary Special | #1 | Aug 2009 | one-shot | |
| Young Avengers | vol. 1 | #1–12 | Apr 2005 – Aug 2006 | | |
| Young Avengers | vol. 1 | Special #1 | Feb 2006 | | |
| Young Avengers | vol. 2 | #1–15 | Mar 2013 – Mar 2014 | | |
| Young Avengers Presents | | #1–6 | Mar 2008 – Aug 2008 | limited series | |
| Young X-Men | | #1–12 | May 2008 – May 2009 | | |
| Youngblood/X-Force | | #1 | Jul 1996 | one-shot; co-published with Image Comics | |
| Your Friendly Neighborhood Spider-Man | | #1–5 | Feb 2025 – Jun 2025 | limited series; prequel to the animated series | |
| Ythaq | No Escape | #1–3 | Apr 2009 – Jun 2009 | limited series | |
| Ythaq | The Forsaken World | #1–3 | 2008 – 2009 | limited series | |
| Yuppies From Hell | | #1 | Jan 1989 | one-shot | |

== Z ==
| Title | Series | Issues | Dates | Notes | Reference |
|---|---|---|---|---|---|
| Ziggy Pig - Silly Seal Comics | vol. 2 | #1 | May 2019 | one-shot; vol. 1 published by Timely Comics | |
| Zombie | | #1–4 | Nov 2006 – Feb 2007 | limited series | |
| Zombie | Simon Garth | #1–4 | Jan 2008 – Apr 2008 | limited series | |
| Zombies Assemble | | #0–3 | Jul 2017 – Sep 2017 | limited series | |
| Zombies Assemble | 2 | #1–4 | Oct 2017 – Jan 2018 | limited series | |
| Zombies Christmas Carol | | #1–5 | Aug 2011 – Oct 2011 | limited series | |
| Zorro | | #1–12 | Dec 1990 – Nov 1991 | | |

== See also ==
- List of Timely and Atlas Comics publications
- List of first appearances in Marvel Comics publications
- List of X-Men comics

For the titles from other Marvel imprints, see the following articles:

- Epic Comics
- Icon Comics
- Marvel Music
- Marvel UK - List of Marvel UK publications
- Razorline
- Star Comics
