= Keng =

Keng or KENG may refer to:

- Keng (surname), or Geng, a Chinese surname
- Keng (artist), a Chinese artist known for their work drawing Aero
- Keng, Kermanshah, a village in Iran
- KENG (FM), a radio station (88.5 FM) licensed to serve Ruidoso, New Mexico, United States
- KDBN, a radio station (101.1 FM) licensed to serve Parachute, Colorado, United States, which held the call sign KENG from 2008 to 2009
