= John Wick (comics) =

Comic book limited series

- Cover for issue #5 by Giovanni Valletta.

Publication information
- Publisher: Dynamite Entertainment
- Format: Limited series
- Publication date: November 2017 – February 2019
- No. of issues: 5
- Main character: Jardani Jovanovich / John Wick

Creative team
- Written by: Greg Pak
- Artists: Giovanni Valletta (#1–2); Matt Gaudio (#3–5)
- Letterer: Tom Napolitano
- Colorist(s): David Curiel and Inlight Studios
- Editors: Anthony Marques (#1–3); Joseph Rybrandt (#4–5)

Collected editions
- John Wick: ISBN 978-152410-6829

John Wick is an American neo-noir comic book limited series written by Greg Pak and drawn by Giovanni Valletta (issues 1–2) and Matt Gaudio (issues 3–5). Published by Dynamite Entertainment, the series is a prequel to the neo-noir action thriller media franchise of the same name created by Derek Kolstad and starring Keanu Reeves as John Wick, with the comic book using Reeves' likeness for the character. The series chronicles a young John Wick after his release from prison and his first vendetta. The series, originally published between November 2017 and February 2019, was published as a graphic novel, John Wick: The Book of Rules, on June 16, 2020.

== Premise ==
When a young John Wick emerges from prison and embarks upon his first, epic vendetta, he comes up against a strange, powerful community of assassins and must learn how to master the Book of Rules that guides their lethal business.

== Characters ==
- Jardani "Johnny" Jovanovich / John Wick – A freelancer assassin embarking on a vendetta for the murder of his village twelve years earlier.
- Charon – A concierge at the Continental Hotel sought out by the Three Bills.
- Maria – An Adjudicator of the High Table interested in acquiring Wick's service.
- The Three Bills – Pecos, Buffalo, and Billy, a trio of assassins formerly associated with Wick.
- Calamity – The Three Bills' insane former bazooka-wielding enforcer and the true target of Wick's vendetta.

== Reception ==
| Issue # | Publication date | Critic rating | Critic reviews | Ref. |
|---|---|---|---|---|
| 1 | November 2017 | 6.7/10 | 21 | |
| 2 | April 2018 | 6.5/10 | 9 | |
| 3 | September 2018 | —N/a | 0 | |
| 4 | December 2018 | —N/a | 0 | |
| 5 | February 2019 | —N/a | 0 | |
| Overall | | 6.6/10 | 30 | |
