= Greg Land =

American comic book artist

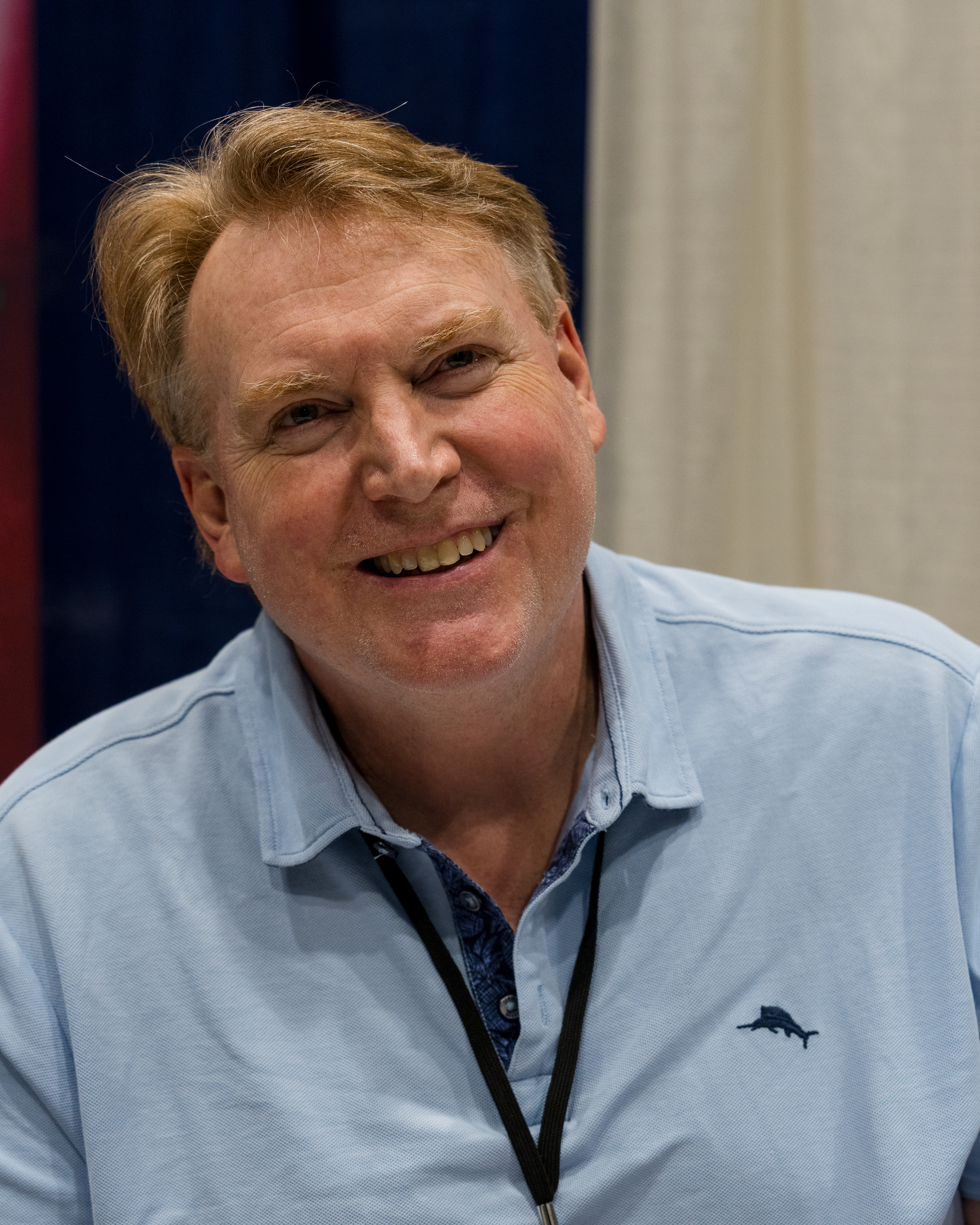
- Land at GalaxyCon Oklahoma City in 2026
- Born: 1963 (age 62–63)
- Area: Penciller
- Notable works: Sojourn; Ultimate Fantastic Four; Uncanny X-Men; X-Men: Phoenix – Endsong

Greg Land (born 1963) is an American comic book artist, best known for his work on books such as Uncanny X-Men, Birds of Prey, and Fantastic Four.

== Career ==
Greg Land first got a job with an independent publisher as the artist for StormQuest after advertising himself at a Mid-Ohio Con comic convention. After that, he was hired by DC Comics in 1999 to finish the covers for Birds of Prey, based on the sketches of Brian Stelfreeze. He also had runs as interior penciler on both Birds of Prey and Nightwing.

Later, Land began to work at CrossGen Comics on Sojourn. The series ran from July 2001 through May 2004, for a total of 34 issues.

After CrossGen went out of business, Land went on to work at Marvel Comics, where he did covers to various series. This led to a collaboration with writer Greg Pak as the main artist of X-Men: Phoenix – Endsong. Next, Land became the penciler for Ultimate Fantastic Four. He did the artwork for a crossover between Marvel's Supremeverse and the Ultimate Universe, entitled Ultimate Power, which was written by Brian Michael Bendis, J. Michael Straczynski and Jeph Loeb. He then did the covers for Marvel Zombies 3 which were all homages to posters of notable zombie movies.

In 2008, Land illustrated Uncanny X-Men #500. From then until December 2011 he would illustrate several sporadic sets of issues, totaling 22 in all, his last being issue #544. During this same period he also illustrated issue #210 and 235–237 of X-Men: Legacy.

In 2012, Land illustrated issues #5–8 and 11–12 of the relaunched Uncanny X-Men.

== Plagiarism accusations ==
Land has been accused of going beyond the accepted bounds of photographic reference, lifting images from sources that include hardcore pornography, and copying them into his pages outright with minimal Photoshop alterations to make the work appear to be an original drawing, a reputation he developed from his work on Ultimate Fantastic Four and Ultimate Power. Land has agreed that he does employ photo reference to a large extent, and that he uses pornography as a source, but denies that the extent to which he does so is questionable. The A.V. Club included him in their 2009 list of "21 artists who changed mainstream comics (for better or worse)" for this reason.

Commenting on Land's work on Uncanny X-Men #510, Brian Cronin of CBR.com remarked that the issue "possibly has the most harmful art to a story that I’ve seen in a comic," saying that Land's limited supply of poses and use of the same models for multiple characters "results in terrible art and particularly terrible storytelling." He was also mocked for his limited use of facial expressions on the Thing.

Land has also been accused of directly swiping art from other comics artists, and is considered "notorious" for tracing his art from other sources.

Land's art for Marvel's Aliens Omnibus was pointed out by artist Tristan Jones as containing direct copies of various pieces of Jones' own Aliens artwork. Similarities were also found between elements of Land's cover and an Alien portrait by Andy Brase, a catalog photo of a sculpted Alien egg toy by NECA, and a screenshot from the Sega video game Aliens: Colonial Marines.

== Bibliography ==
=== DC Comics ===
- Action Comics #743 (1998)
- Birds of Prey #1–6, 8–10 (full pencils); #13 (along with Patrick Zircher) (1999–2000)
- Birds of Prey: Black Canary – Batgirl (one shot) (1998)
- JLA #15 (along with Howard Porter) (1998)
- New Titans Annual #11 (1995)
- Legends of the DC Universe #7–9 (1998)
- Nightwing vol. 1 #1–4 (1995)
- Nightwing vol. 2 #41–43, 45–46, 48–50, 52, 54–56, Annual #1 (2000–2001)
- Nightwing/Huntress #1–4 (1998)
- Supergirl vol. 4 #11–12, Annual 2 (1997)

=== Marvel Comics ===
- Avenging Spider-Man #4 (2012)
- Astonishing X-Men vol. 2 #13-17 (2018)
- Free Comic Book Day X-Men: Pixies and Demons (2008)
- Future Imperfect #1–5 (2015)
- Incredible Hulk #709–713 (2017–2018)
- Iron Man vol. 5 #1–9 (2013)
- Mighty Avengers vol. 2 #1–5, 9-12 (2013–2014)
- Ultimate Fantastic Four #21–32 (2005–2006)
- Ultimate Power (2006–2008)
- Uncanny X-Men #500–503, 508–511, 515–517, 520–521, 530–531, 540–542 (2008–2011)
- Uncanny X-Men vol. 2 #5–8, 11–12 (2012)
- Uncanny X-Men vol. 4 #1–5, 11–15 (2016–17)
- Weapon X vol. 3 #1–4 (2017)
- X-Men: Phoenix - Endsong (2005)
- X-Men Unlimited #13 (1996)
- X-Men: Legacy #235–237 (2010)
- Predator vs. Wolverine #1 (2023)

=== Other publishers ===
- StormQuest #1 (1994) (Caliber Press)
- Sojourn #1–6, 8–11, 13–16, 18–20, 22–25, 27–29, 31–33 (2001–2004) (CrossGen)
