= Phoenix Force =

Fictional entity from Marvel Comics

- The Phoenix Force with Jean Grey, its primary host, as seen on the variant cover of Phoenix Resurrection: The Return of Jean Grey #1. Art by Bilquis Evely.

Publication information
- Publisher: Marvel Comics
- First appearance: The Uncanny X-Men #101 (October 1976)
- Created by: Chris Claremont; Dave Cockrum

In-story information
- Alter ego: Various hosts
- Species: Cosmic entity
- Place of origin: White Hot Room
- Team affiliations: X-Men; Hellfire Club; Galactic Guardians; Phoenix Corps; Avengers
- Notable aliases: Phoenix; Jean Grey; White Phoenix of the Crown; Star-Child; The Black Angel; Chaos-Bringer; Black Queen; Dark Phoenix; Child of the M'Kraan Crystal; Thunderbird
- Abilities: Energy manipulation; Matter manipulation; Life-force manipulation; Cosmic awareness; Resurrection; Powerful psionic abilities: Prescience; Telepathy; Telekinesis

The Phoenix Force is a fictional entity appearing in American comic books published by Marvel Comics. Created by Chris Claremont and Dave Cockrum, the Phoenix Force represents the cosmic power of destruction and rebirth, just like the Phoenix of mythology. It travels the cosmos, and appears to Earth's mutants in time of need, but over time, the near-unlimited power it grants can drive human mutants who host it insane. It is famous for its central role in The Dark Phoenix Saga storyline, and is intrinsically linked to Jean Grey.

== Publication history ==
The Phoenix first appeared in Uncanny X-Men #101 (October 1976), and was created by Chris Claremont and Dave Cockrum. As of June 2026, the Phoenix Force has appeared in 15 other comics split between the Avengers and Uncanny X-Men. It also appeared in one edition of the Guardians of the Galaxy series.

== Fictional character biography ==
The Phoenix Force is an immortal manifestation of the universal force of life and passion. It was created by the universe in the void between states of being. The Phoenix Force is the nexus of all psionic energy of the past, present, and future in all realities of the multiverse, the Guardian of Creation and of the M'Kraan Crystal.

=== Jean Grey ===
The Phoenix Force returns to Earth when it feels the mind of a human transcend the physical realm and resonate with its energy. Jean Grey telepathically linked her mind to her dying friend Annie Richardson to keep Annie's soul from moving to the afterlife. In doing so, Jean's mind is dragged along to the "other side" with Annie. The Phoenix lends its energy to break the connection, and keeps a close watch on Jean because it feels a kinship with her. Years later, when Jean is dying on a space shuttle, the Phoenix Force saves her, transforming Jean into the Phoenix.

An encounter with the Hellfire Club and manipulation by Mastermind and Emma Frost transforms the Phoenix into their Black Queen. She breaks free of Mastermind's control, but transforms into the Dark Phoenix. Phoenix battles the X-Men before fleeing into space, destroying the D'Bari system's sun to satisfy her hunger. In doing so, she causes the near-extinction of the D'Bari species. After returning to Earth, the Dark Phoenix is defeated in psionic combat by Professor X, and Jean Grey regains control. She apparently commits suicide on Earth's moon.

As originally written, the Jean Grey incarnation of Phoenix is Jean herself, having attained her ultimate potential as a psi, becoming a being of pure energy and reforming herself as Phoenix. This storyline was retconned to reveal the existence of the cosmic Phoenix Force entity, which had taken Jean's form and believed itself to be her. The real Jean Grey laid in a healing cocoon at the bottom of Jamaica Bay, where the Avengers and Fantastic Four discover her.

=== Rachel Summers ===
Another known possessor of the Phoenix Force is Rachel Summers, Cyclops and Jean Grey's daughter from the alternate future of Days of Future Past. The Phoenix Force bonds with Rachel, making her the next avatar of the Phoenix Force.

=== Endsong and Warsong ===
The Phoenix Force returns to Earth during the mini-series X-Men: Phoenix – Endsong, where it resurrects Jean Grey. It is not long before she remembers what she has come for—Scott Summers. She needs to feed from the energy from his optic blasts, and, confused by her own emotions, thinks she is in love with Scott. She realizes Scott is in love with Emma Frost. Through a number of incidents, Jean manages to assert herself and gain control of the Phoenix Force with emotional support from the X-Men. Jean then declares that she and the Phoenix Force are truly one entity, have transcended into the White Phoenix of the Crown, signified by a new white and gold costume.

In the series X-Men: Phoenix – Warsong, part of the Phoenix Force bonds with the Stepford Cuckoos. After nearly losing control to the Phoenix power, the Stepford Cuckoos develop a secondary mutation that transforms their hearts into diamond, allowing them to contain the Phoenix Force. During a conflict with Predator X, the Stepford Cuckoos are overwhelmed and knocked unconscious as the Phoenix Force escapes their bodies.

=== Avengers vs. X-Men ===
Phoenix Five portrayed on the cover of Avengers vs. X-Men #5, June 2012; Left and right: Namor, Emma Frost, Cyclops with Hope Summers, Colossus and Magik (illustration by John Romita Jr.)

During the Avengers vs. X-Men storyline, the Phoenix Force returns to Earth, presumably to reclaim Hope Summers, which leads to a confrontation between the Avengers and the X-Men on how to deal with its arrival. The Avengers anticipate the destruction that the Phoenix could bring, while Cyclops hopes to use the Phoenix Force to restart the mutant population.

As the Phoenix Force nears Earth, the Avengers fight the X-Men with Hope caught in the middle, while Iron Man and Giant-Man prepare a disruptor weapon to kill the Phoenix Force. Instead, the Phoenix Force is divided into five fragments that bond with Cyclops, Emma Frost, Namor, Colossus, and Magik.

Spider-Man baits Colossus and Magik into taking each other out by playing off of their fears when fighting them in a volcano, forcing their portions of the Phoenix to be divided between Emma Frost and Cyclops. Cyclops invades K'un-L'un, then takes Frost's power. He elevates to the level of Dark Phoenix, killing Professor X in the process.

Hope and Scarlet Witch take down the Dark Phoenix, while Jean Grey appears within Cyclops' mind and convinces him to let go of the Phoenix Force. The Phoenix escapes Cyclops' body and enters Hope. Together, Hope and the Scarlet Witch wish away the Phoenix Force and the damage it caused, in the process activating the X-gene that allows the creation of new mutants around the world.

=== Time Runs Out and Secret Wars ===
At some point during the Time Runs Out storyline, Cyclops acquires a Phoenix Egg that he holds in reserve, hoping to use it to end the Incursions.

During the Secret Wars storyline, Cyclops uses the Phoenix Egg to bond with the Phoenix Force and decimate the Children of Tomorrow. Cyclops survives the subsequent Incursion with a full memory of what had come before, proclaiming that resurrection was the goal of their mission.

=== All New, All Different Marvel ===
After being killed by Nebula, Thane opens the egg and become the new host of the Phoenix. Using his new powers, Thane defeats his father Thanos and conquers the Black Quadrant. Thane finds Thanos and fights him, causing them both to fall into the entrance to the God Quarry. Inside, the Coven senses the Phoenix Force inside of Thane and separates it from him so that Thane can fight his father as the man he truly is. The Phoenix Force flies off and leaves the God Quarry.

=== Enter the Phoenix ===
Namor attempts to take the Phoenix Force by force, leading to a battle with the Avengers and Agents of Wakanda. However, the Phoenix decides to hold a contest to judge who would be worthy to become its next host. The entity selects Captain America and Doctor Doom as its first combatants. Realizing that the Phoenix refuses to let Captain America die, Doom forfeits. At the tournament's conclusion, Echo is chosen as the Phoenix's new host.

== Hosts ==
- Jean Grey: The most powerful and complete Phoenix Force and host combination. Together they became the White Phoenix of the Crown.
- Rook'shir: A Shi'ar who channels the Phoenix Force through the Blade of the Phoenix.
- Feron: Ancestor of the modern-day Feron whose daydream-like visions prompt the Phoenix to adopt the firebird form.
- Necrom: Necrom stole a fraction of the Phoenix Force from Feron that is later known as the Anti-Phoenix.
- Fongji: Host who lived in K'un-L'un centuries ago and was trained in the Iron Fist. The previous guardians of K'un-L'un decided to keep her existence and the Phoenix Force's connection to the legacy of the Iron Fist a secret until its next return.
- Madelyne Pryor: A clone of Jean Grey who was brought to life by a fraction of the Phoenix Force.
- Rachel Summers: The daughter of Jean Grey and Scott Summers from an alternate timeline who has been referred to as "The One True Phoenix". Rachel is the longest Earth-born host of the Phoenix.
- Professor X: Charles Xavier briefly possesses an echo of the Phoenix Force during his time with the Starjammers.
- Diamanda Nero: briefly becomes the host of the Phoenix after her fight with Rachel. She is unable to contain the Phoenix.
- Prime: Prime is briefly possessed by the Phoenix Force while it is in the Malibu Universe.
- Amber Hunt: Amber is possessed by the Phoenix Force while it is in the Malibu Universe.
- Foxfire
- Quentin Quire: Quire reconstitutes his body using a fragment of the shattered Phoenix Force when it comes to Earth, but it leaves him to his "sickness".
- Emma Frost: Emma Frost has become the host for the Phoenix Force on two occasions. In the first instance she is unable to contain it, stating that she is not "strong" enough. Greg Pak later elaborated on this in an interview after the second series X-Men: Phoenix – Warsong that "perhaps the Phoenix requires a willingness to open oneself up or give oneself away" in a way that Frost at the time could not, which was why Celeste Cuckoo was the only Emma Frost clone to truly become Phoenix. She later becomes a true host to the Phoenix (see Phoenix Five).
- Stepford Cuckoos: The group possesses a fraction of the Phoenix Force that they imprison in their hearts. The Cuckoos later lose their connection to the Phoenix fragment, as the fragment escapes their diamond hearts without a known destination.
- Korvus: Descendant of Rook'shir and wielder of the Blade of the Phoenix.
- Captain Marvel
- Hope Summers
- Thane: The half-Inhuman son of Thanos. He becomes a host of the Phoenix Force after his death and subsequent rebirth hatches a Phoenix Egg. He loses his connection to the Phoenix when the Coven separates it from him when he and his father have one last fight in the God Quarry.
- Lady Phoenix: Born during prehistoric times, Firehair was abandoned by her parents as an infant at the Burnt Place because of her red hair. A pack of wolves took her in and she grows up a feral child. After her warnings cause a deadly conflict between her tribe, the Tribe Without Fear, and other xenophobic tribes, Firehair contemplates suicide. She is saved by the Phoenix Force, but loses control until she is pacified by the wolf that saved her as an infant.
- Moon Knight
- Chosen Champions of the Phoenix: During the Enter the Phoenix storyline, the Phoenix Force holds a tournament to judge who its next host will be, choosing many participants from around the world, empowering each of them with a portion of its power and pitting them in trials by combat, with the eliminated contestants losing its power. Despite being defeated and left for dead by Namor under the Atlantic Ocean in an earlier match, the Phoenix is drawn to Echo's suffering and refusal to die, ultimately choosing her as its host.
- Taaia: Taaia was briefly possessed by Phoenix when entering the White Hot Room after being mortally wounded in a fight with the Beyonders. It used her to separate and attack the rest of the Defenders, but America Chavez was able to keep her distracted with the Eternity Mask, while Tigra summoned the Phoenix's opposite, the Tiger God to attack it and free Taaia from its control.
- America Chavez: While fighting a Phoenix-possessed Taaia, Chavez uses the Eternity Mask to steal a portion of it for herself. Chavez loses her connection to the Phoenix when Taaia's connection is severed by the Tiger God.
- Dark Phoenix: While appearing to be a gold-skinned woman in a robe, she would later be revealed to be a version of Mystique from King Thor's reality of Earth-14412.
- Adani: A member of the Universal Church of Truth.

== White Hot Room ==
The White Hot Room is an extradimensional space that acts as the home of the Phoenix Force and an afterlife for Phoenix hosts. During the Fall of X crossover, the majority of Krakoa's population (around 250,000 mutants) are transported to the White Hot Room. While many of the mutants return to Earth to fight Orchis, a large number of them remain in the White Hot Room with Krakoa.

== Powers and abilities ==
The Phoenix Force can manipulate cosmic energies and tap into the life-force reserved for future generations, which denies their existence. It can wield this energy to project beams of immense destructive force. It can migrate throughout time and space by folding its energy back into itself, causing it to collapse akin to a black hole and then reform itself upon reaching its destination. It can directly absorb offensive energy such as Cyclops' optic blasts or the energy and life-force from a foe. As it is the nexus of all psionic energy, it has mental abilities on a cosmic level, including telepathy and telekinesis.

It allows its preferred host to perform cosmic pyrokinesis, as it allows Lady Phoenix from 1,000,000 BC Avengers to summon preternatural flames that can melt supernovas. For Jean Grey, it allows her to perform cosmic pyrokinesis strong enough to easily defeat Terrax, as she is in complete control of her own cosmic fire that after Terrax submits to his defeat, the fire dissipates at her will leaving him charred. She also uses the cosmic fire blast to counter Galactus. In some conditions, a bit of cosmic fire can easily burn anything it comes into contact, as when it possesses young Jean Grey she unconsciously melts the equipment the medics try to put on her.

Another major display of the power of the Phoenix is during Secret Wars II. Rachel Summers seeks to kill the Beyonder, who expresses both amazement and disappointment in her. With that, the Beyonder gives Rachel full access to the power of the Phoenix as well as some of his own. With such power, Rachel is able to absorb the consciousness of every sentient mortal being in the universe.

The Phoenix often seeks hosts with strong inherent psionic abilities so they can withstand its power. When the Phoenix Force enters a host, a small fragment of its power is left behind when it leaves. Even a small fragment can be stronger than an inexperienced host using the Phoenix Force's powers, such as with Rachel Summers, who has full access to the Force, but her opponent Necrom threw moons at her with only a fragment. When bonded with a host, the Phoenix Force amplifies their abilities to incalculable levels. It can manipulate matter on a sub-atomic level and transmute elements, like turning wood to gold or stone to crystal; on a smaller scale, it can alter the molecular fabrics. It can teleport others across space and open interdimensional portals to instantly access distant portions of the Universe. If an avatar of the Phoenix Force is harmed or killed, it forms an "egg" of cosmic power around them that is incubated in the White Hot Room, and hatches out completely healed. As one of the oldest cosmic beings, the Phoenix Force possesses a high level of cosmic awareness and prescience.

== Cultural impact and legacy ==
=== Critical reception ===
Tamara Jude of Sideshow stated, "The Phoenix Force holds a significant place in the Marvel Comics and stands as the most unforgettable element of X-Men member Jean Grey's comic book history. This character-defining arc, known as the Phoenix Saga and the Dark Phoenix Saga, has resonated with fans for decades with its compelling plot, vibrant panels and shocking ending. The legacy of the Phoenix Force stretches well beyond the pages of Marvel Comics. The Dark Phoenix Saga is regarded as one of the best comic book arcs in history and has become a fan-favorite. It is also one of the favored arcs by comic book critics around the world." Tristan Benns of Screen Rant referred to the Phoenix Force as "one of the X-Men's most iconic concepts," writing, "As a staple of Marvel Comics' X-Men franchise, the Phoenix Force has been a fan-favorite concept well known to both heroes and readers alike for decades. But as long-lived and mysterious as the Phoenix is, it's hard for anybody to ever truly know its full story."

=== Accolades ===
- In 2006, Wizard ranked Jean Grey's Dark Phoenix persona 38th in their "100 Greatest Villains of All Time" list.
- In 2013, IGN ranked Jean Grey's Dark Phoenix persona 9th in their "Top 100 Comic Book Villains of All Time" list.
- In 2013, Complex ranked the Dark Phoenix 13th in their "25 Greatest Comic Book Villains of All Time" list.
- In 2022, Newsarama ranked Jean Grey's Dark Phoenix persona 10th in their "Best Marvel supervillains" list.
- Various articles have assessed the Phoenix Force as among the most powerful characters in Marvel Comics.

== In other media ==
=== Television ===
The Phoenix Force as displayed by Jean Grey in X-Men: The Animated Series

- The Phoenix Force via Jean Grey appears in X-Men: The Animated Series, voiced by Jennifer Dale. In the five-part episode "The Phoenix Saga", the Phoenix Force's power is assimilated by Grey amidst the X-Men's battle with the Shi'ar and the Starjammers for the M'Kraan Crystal. In the four-part episode "The Dark Phoenix", the Phoenix Force possesses Grey and turns her into the Dark Phoenix when the Inner Circle Club attempt to use its power for their own gain. Grey attempts to sacrifice herself via a Shi'ar weapon, but the Phoenix Force is purified and resurrects her.
  - The Phoenix Force via Jean Grey and Rachel Summers appears in X-Men '97.
- The Phoenix Force via Jean Grey appears in X-Men: Evolution. In "Power Surge", Grey is overwhelmed by her abilities before she is defeated by Rogue. In the series finale "Ascension", the Phoenix Force briefly emerges during Grey's fight with one of Apocalypse's Horsemen. Additionally, Professor X has a vision of the future depicting the cosmic entity having taken over Grey and fighting the X-Men.
- The Phoenix Force appears in Wolverine and the X-Men. This version is an entity that takes psychic mutants as hosts, entering their bodies at birth, growing within and eventually taking over once the hosts come of age. It forcibly emerged within Jean Grey, which caused her to lose control and disappear. In the series finale "Foresight", the Inner Circle transfer the Phoenix Force from Grey to the Stepford Cuckoos who lose control, resulting in Emma Frost sacrificing herself to send the Phoenix Force back into space.
- The Phoenix Force via Jean Grey appears in Marvel Anime: X-Men.

=== Film ===
Famke Janssen as the Phoenix in X-Men: The Last Stand (2006)

Two incarnations of the Phoenix Force via Jean Grey appear in the X-Men film series.

- The first incarnation appears in the films X-Men (2000), X2, and X-Men: The Last Stand (2006), portrayed by Famke Janssen. This version is a purely instinctual, ruthless, and powerful entity that existed within the unconscious side of Grey's mind since childhood and embodies her darker personality traits. Though Charles Xavier put several psychic barriers within her mind to limit its power, the Phoenix gradually emerges as the barriers are removed amidst Grey's work with the X-Men. Following her death while foiling Colonel William Stryker's plot to kill all mutants, the Phoenix takes over her body, kills Cyclops and Xavier, and joins Magneto's Brotherhood of Mutants in their violent protest against a mutant cure until Wolverine kills it and Grey.
- The second incarnation appears in the films X-Men: Apocalypse and Dark Phoenix, portrayed by Sophie Turner. This version manifests as a solar flare-like entity and is stated to be a cosmic force of supreme power as well as a fragment of the universe's energy. It entered Grey's body during her childhood, though she was largely able to suppress it on her own. Nonetheless, she struggles to maintain control of her powers. Following the Phoenix Force's emergence amidst the X-Men's fight with Apocalypse, Grey fully loses control and is attacked by the D'Bari Vuk who intends to steal the Phoenix Force for herself so she can turn Earth into a new home for her people. With the X-Men's help, Grey uses the Phoenix Force to destroy Vuk's forces before departing Earth.

=== Video games ===
- The Phoenix Force via Rachel Summers appears as a playable character in X-Men II: The Fall of the Mutants.
- The Phoenix Force via Jean Grey appears in X-Men: Mutant Academy and X-Men: Mutant Academy 2.
- The Phoenix Force appears as "Spider-Phoenix", an alternate skin for Peter Parker / Spider-Man in Spider-Man 2: Enter Electro.
- The Phoenix Force via Jean Grey appears in X-Men: Next Dimension.
- The Phoenix Force via Jean Grey appears in Marvel: Ultimate Alliance and Marvel: Ultimate Alliance 2.
- The Phoenix Force via Jean Grey appears as a playable character in Marvel vs. Capcom 3: Fate of Two Worlds and Ultimate Marvel vs. Capcom 3.
- The Phoenix Force via Jean Grey and Hope Summers appears in Marvel Super Hero Squad Online.
- The Phoenix Force via Jean Grey and the Phoenix Five appears in Marvel Avengers Alliance.
- The Phoenix Force via Jean Gray appears as a playable character in Marvel Avengers: Battle for Earth.
- The Phoenix Force via Jean Grey appears as a playable character in Marvel Heroes.
- The Phoenix Force via Jean Grey appears as a playable character in Lego Marvel Super Heroes.
- The Phoenix Force via Jean Grey appears as a playable character and a boss in Marvel: Contest of Champions.
- The Phoenix Force via Jean Grey, Rachel Summers and the Phoenix Five appears in Marvel: Future Fight.
- The Phoenix Force via Jean Grey appears as a playable character in Marvel Puzzle Quest.
- The Phoenix Force via Jean Grey appears as a playable character and a boss in Marvel Ultimate Alliance 3: The Black Order.
- The Phoenix Force via Jean Grey appears as a playable character in Marvel Super War.
- The Phoenix Force via Jean Grey appears as a purchasable outfit in Fortnite Battle Royale.
- The Phoenix Force via Jean Grey appears as a playable character in Marvel Rivals.
- The Phoenix Force via Cyclops appears as a playable character in Marvel Tokon: Fighting Souls. Magik's Phoenix Five costume also appears as a DLC costume.
