= Ultimate Power =

US comic book

- Ultimate Power Trade Paperback Cover

Publication information
- Publisher: Marvel Comics
- Schedule: Monthly
- Format: Mini-series
- Publication date: December 2006-February 2008
- No. of issues: Nine
- Main character(s): Ultimate Spider-Man; Ultimate X-Men; Ultimate Fantastic Four; The Ultimates; The Squadron Supreme

Creative team
- Created by: Brian Michael Bendis; J. Michael Straczynski; Jeph Loeb; Greg Land
- Written by: Brian Michael Bendis (#1-3); J. Michael Straczynski (#4-6); Jeph Loeb (#7-9)
- Penciller: Greg Land
- Inker: Matt Ryan
- Colorist: Justin Ponsor

Ultimate Power is a nine-issue comic book limited series published by Marvel Comics.

The series is a crossover that ties the Supreme Power universe into the Ultimate Marvel universe and was written by Brian Michael Bendis, J. Michael Straczynski and Jeph Loeb with art by Greg Land.

== History ==
Ultimate Power signifies the first complete Ultimate Universe crossover, that effectively integrates all current ongoing series and is also the first that spans another already extant Marvel Universe.

One notable effect is the absence of the Ultimate incarnation of Nick Fury from his home reality, as he is given over to the custody of the Squadron Supreme in the series finale. This absence is already present in the Ultimate Spider-Man story arc "Death of a Goblin", where Carol Danvers has taken Fury's place as the commanding officer of S.H.I.E.L.D.

== Plot ==
=== Issue One ===
The Fantastic Four defeat the Serpent Squad, an all-female supervillain team attempting to infiltrate Project Pegasus at the Devil's Point, Wyoming facility. As the captured Serpent Squad is led away by authorities, one member admonishes Ben as a freak who will die alone, renewing his grief over his irreversible condition and Reed Richards' promises to reverse the transformation that turned him into the Thing.

Reed requests funding from S.H.I.E.L.D. to send advanced data retrieval probes into neighboring dimensions for inter-dimensional research and exploration purposes. S.H.I.E.L.D. Director Nick Fury refuses, not wishing to risk inter-dimensional security solely to potentially cure Ben Grimm. Fury also bans Reed from attempting the project on his own time.

Despite Fury's orders, Reed sends five probes into other dimensions, including the N-Zone. Days later, as the team view prototypes for Fantastic Four action figures, the roof of the Baxter Building is ripped open by a massive explosion, heralding the sudden appearance of a group of costumed superheroes, the Squadron Supreme.

=== Issue Two ===
Spider-Man and Kitty Pryde swing through Manhattan when they encounter the smoldering ruins of the Baxter Building, atop which the Fantastic Four are battling the Squadron Supreme, who speak only in garbles and cannot fully control their powers. Kitty calls the X-Men for assistance moments before Nick Fury and the Ultimates drop out of the sky, declaring the Squadron Supreme under arrest.

The X-Men arrive and enter the full-scale superhuman brawl just as the Squadron Supreme adjust to the new dimension and declare Reed Richards under arrest for his crimes against humanity. They demand that he accompany the Squadron Supreme back to their world, holding up one of the devices Richards sent through the N-Zone, much to Nick Fury's bewilderment.

=== Issue Three ===
In the Supremeverse, the President of the United States is moved to a secure bunker by the Secret Service where he learns that an unknown, rapidly growing organism has overwhelmed much of the Eastern United States. The Squadron Supreme are battling the organism and rescuing civilians when Hyperion discovers that the source of the organism is apparently one of Reed Richard's probes.

The Squadron Supreme analyze the device and inadvertently trigger it. A holographic projection appears with an audio greeting from Richards and snapshots of the Fantastic Four and his universe. Hyperion, deducing that Richards knows about the organism, and is responsible for it, immediately organizes an invasion force to apprehend Richards from his own dimension.

In the Ultimate Universe, Hyperion demands that Richards return with them to solve the problem and stand trial for crimes against humanity. Reed agrees, despite fierce resistance from Invisible Woman, and disappears with the Supreme Squadron. Nick Fury immediately begins assembling a rescue team from elements of the X-Men, Ultimates, and Fantastic Four.

=== Issue Four ===
The combined forces of S.H.I.E.L.D., the X-Men, the Ultimates, the Fantastic Four, and Spider-Man board a S.H.I.E.L.D Helicarrier. Thor generates a portal with Mjolnir and traces the signature of the Squadron Supreme towards the Supremeverse.

In the Supremeverse, an intense yet distraught Reed busily studies samples of the organism, in the face of mounting pressure from the rising civilian body count and the mocking comments of Dr. Emil Burbank, who asks Reed what it feels like to be compared to Stalin and Hitler. Reed confesses that he knows nothing about the organism or how to stop it.

On the S.H.I.E.L.D. Helicarrier, Shadowcat searches for Nick Fury, who is not responding to his pages. She phases through a wall and overhears Nick Fury converse with an unseen conspirator about how Richards cannot examine any of his probes, hinting that Fury and the unseen conspirator are keeping something from the Ultimates. Fury finally leaves and returns to the Ultimates, unaware that Kitty has been listening to him.

Hyperion, floating high above Earth's orbit, observes the Helicarrier's arrival and charges in, only to meet a battle-ready Thor.

=== Issue Five ===
Thor and Hyperion collide with a flurry of blows high above Earth while the Ultimate heroes look on from the S.H.I.E.L.D. helicarrier. Nick Fury sends the Invisible Woman and the Human Torch to assist Thor and tip the scales in his favor. Hyperion regains much of his strength and defeats Thor, the Invisible Woman, and the Human Torch, who hurtle through the atmosphere to the Earth below.

Aboard the helicarrier, Spider-Man and Captain America grow suspicious of Nick Fury, believing that he conceals his true motives. Back on the ground Reed Richards, being escorted to a more secure location, peeks outside an air vent to notice the Ultimates locked in a titanic battle with the Squadron Supreme.

=== Issue Six ===
The Ultimates engage the Squadron Supreme, each hero fighting counterparts who are startlingly equal to one another. Reed Richards, now aware that his friends are attempting a rescue mission, pleads with Dr. Burbank to speak with them. Burbank is unsympathetic, rendering Reed unconscious with an odorless, colorless gas.

In the bowels of the S.H.I.E.L.D. Helicarrier, Fury suits up for battle before conferring with the unseen conspirator, outlining his plan to steal the probes and to escape back to the Ultimate universe. Moments later, the conspirator betrays him, knocking him unconscious. S.H.I.E.L.D. guards responding to the sound are likewise dispatched.

Spider-Man awakens Fury, and both rush to the bridge to see that Doctor Doom, revealed as the unseen conspirator, has defeated the Squadron Supreme and the Ultimates and is ready to conquer the Supremeverse.

=== Issue Seven ===
Aboard the Helicarrier, Spider-Man confronts Nick Fury about Doctor Doom's involvement in the Supreme Universe. Fury reveals that he recruited Doom to alter Reed Richards' probes to transmit information to S.H.I.E.L.D. before reporting back to Richards.

In the Supremeverse Pentagon, Burbank gloats to an unconscious Richards that the Defense Department approached him to develop a weapon to kill Hyperion. The alien organism raging across the country is the result, with Richards' probes serving as a scapegoat to eliminate the trail to the Defense Department. Reed, previously feigning unconsciousness, takes Burbank hostage and demands Burbank reveal the truth to the world.

Aboard the S.H.I.E.L.D. Helicarrier, Fury leads Spider-Man to the hangar of the Helicarrier to reveal his secret weapon, a drugged and unconscious Hulk.

In the Pentagon, the X-Men rescue Richards. Before they can escape, the roof disintegrates, leaving Richards and the X-Men staring at Squadron Supreme of Earth-712, who declare that their world too was destroyed; they also demand answers.

=== Issue Eight ===
The Earth-712 Squadron Supreme attacks the Ultimate force, with all sides clearly confused about the presence of more doppelgangers in the Supremeverse. On the street, Thor defeats Hyperion and prepares to rejoin the melee when he is stopped by Doctor Spectrum, who reasons with Thor and asks him to help seek out the truth behind the entire affair.

Doctor Doom defeats Iron Man and is attacked by the Thing, who rips Doom apart and reveals him as a Doombot. As Squadron Supreme 31916 attacks Squadron Supreme 712, Nighthawk 712 approaches Captain America, mistaking him for the Captain America of Earth-616. Scarlet Witch reveals that her powers have resulted in this unusual doppelganger phenomenon.

On the Helicarrier, Nick Fury orders Spider-Man to oversee the Hulk and act as his "conscience" as Hulk leaps into the fray.

=== Issue Nine ===
The Hulk battles both Squadrons Supreme and the Ultimates heroes and begins overwhelming them all. With their combined powers, the Squadrons and the Ultimates narrowly manage to subdue the Hulk before he is knocked unconscious by the Thing.

Both Arcannas succeed in helping the Scarlet Witch return the Earth-712 heroes to their own universe. Nick Fury and Emil Burbank are taken prisoner by the Squadron, both identified as responsible for the worldwide disaster in the Supremeverse. Doctor Doom, the third co-conspirator who escapes apprehension, is promised to the Squadron Supreme when the Ultimates capture him. To ensure their full cooperation, Zarda volunteers to travel to the Ultimate Universe to ensure their compliance.

Back in the Ultimate Universe, Captain America discusses the considerable power of Scarlet Witch's abilities and mentions that Carol Danvers is in the front-running to become the new leader of S.H.I.E.L.D. Back at the Baxter Building, the Thing attempts to come to terms with his permanent condition, but takes solace in being able to defeat the Hulk.

== Collected edition ==
| Title | Material collected | Published date | ISBN |
|---|---|---|---|
| Ultimate Power | Ultimate Power #1-9 | March 2008 | 978-0785123668 |
