= X-Men: Phoenix – Endsong =

2005 comic book series

X-Men: Phoenix - Endsong
- X-Men Phoenix - Endsong #1 (March 2005). Art by Greg Land

Publication information
- Publisher: Marvel Comics
- Schedule: Monthly
- Format: Limited series
- Genre: Superhero
- Publication date: March – June 2005
- No. of issues: 5
- Main character(s): X-Men; Phoenix Force; Shi'ar

Creative team
- Written by: Greg Pak
- Penciller: Greg Land
- Inker: Matt Ryan
- Letterer: Clem Robins
- Colorist: Justin Ponsor
- Editor(s): Mike Marts; Stephanie Moore; Sean Ryan

Collected editions
- Hardcover: ISBN 0-7851-1641-9

X-Men: Phoenix – Endsong is an American five-issue comic book limited series published by Marvel Comics in 2005. It was written by Greg Pak with art by Greg Land.

Greg Pak said "The biggest new character is actually the Phoenix Force it/herself, whom we're exploring as a thinking, learning sentient creature with a big and terrifying and moving emotional arc of her own."

== Plot ==
The Shi'ar resurrect the dormant Phoenix Force prematurely and without a host, in hopes of destroying it. The Phoenix escapes to Earth where it resurrects Jean Grey and forcefully bonds with her again, despite Jean's pleas that it is "too early."

Wolverine finds Jean standing completely naked in a field, before the Shi'ar fire a miniature black hole at the two. The Phoenix Force teleports Jean and Wolverine to the North Pole. Seeing an injured Logan, Jean is able to resurface and gain control. She asks him to stop the Phoenix. Wolverine stabs her with his claws many times, but she will not remain dead. He does however manage to weaken the Phoenix greatly, and Jean embeds herself in the ice in the hopes of subduing them both. The Phoenix breaks away from Jean while she is within the ice.

The X-Men arrive at the North Pole in the Blackbird, and in the ensuing battle, the Phoenix attempts to force herself onto Scott and use him to strengthen her powers. She uses his memories of Jean to provoke Scott, but realizes that he now loves Emma Frost and possesses her. Emma, who is unable to contain the Phoenix Force, is manipulated by Quentin Quire, who hopes to use the Phoenix to resurrect Sophie of the Stepford Cuckoos. His actions results in the Phoenix growing more enraged and uncontrollable. Cyclops realizes that Jean is the only hope of containing the Phoenix. He frees her from the ice, and Jean is able to rip the Phoenix Force out of Emma Frost. The Phoenix is shocked, but Jean merely replies, "Don't you remember? I am you." The Phoenix taunts Jean about losing Cyclops' love; distressed, Jean begins to lose control. Cyclops realizes that Jean needs to feel the love he and her teammates have for her, and has Emma and the Stepford Cuckoos contact all of the current and former X-Men around the world to focus their love into Jean.

Jean regains control and transcends into the White Phoenix of the Crown in time to save the team from another black hole created by the Shi’ar. Before she departs, Jean asks Scott to remove his visor because she wants to see his eyes. Enveloped in his optic blast, she leaves for the White Hot Room to gather the missing pieces of herself, giving Scott one last goodbye.

== Reception ==
The series was very popular, and "surprised many readers with its nuance and depth." The success led to a sequel featuring the continuing story of the Phoenix Force, X-Men: Phoenix - Warsong.

== Timeline ==
X-Men: Phoenix - Endsong takes place during Uncanny X-Men #460.

== Collected editions ==
The mini-series was collected into a hardcover volume, published in July 2005 (ISBN 0-7851-1641-9).

A trade paperback containing the five issues was published in February 2006 (ISBN 0-7851-1924-8).
