= Aero (manhua) =

Chinese action/superhero manhua series

- English cover of Aero Vol. 1 (TPB). Art by Keng.
- First appearance: Aero #1 (2019)
- Created by: Zhou Liefen (writer); Keng (artist)

Publication information
- Publisher: NetEase in association with Marvel Comics
- Schedule: Monthly
- Formats: Original material for the series has been published as a set of ongoing series.
- Genre: Superhero
- Publication date: July 3, 2019 - present
- Main character(s): Aero

Creative team
- Writer(s): Zhou Liefen, Greg Pak (US edition backup stories)
- Penciller(s): Keng, Pop Mhan (US edition backup stories)
- Inker(s): Keng, Pop Mhan (US edition backup stories)
- Letterer(s): Joe Caramagna (English translation)
- Colourist(s): Keng, Frederico Blee (US Edition backup stories)
- Editor(s): Mark Paniccia

Reprints
- Collected editions
- Volume 1: ISBN 978-1-302-91944-3

Aero (Simplified Chinese: 气旋) is a Chinese action-superhero manhua series written by Zhou Liefen and drawn by artist Keng since 2019. It is published by NetEase in collaboration with Marvel Comics. The series is a precursor to and spinoff of Marvel's Agents of Atlas comic book, and introduces the character of Lei Ling (aka Aero), a young architect based in Shanghai who possesses the ability to control and feel air currents, read chi, and fly. The series is translated into English by Greg Pak, who also writes backup stories in the English language comic-book reprints, which are drawn by Pop Mhan and coloured by Frederico Blee. These backup stories are not included in the trade paperback collected editions of the series.

== Publication history ==
Lei Ling debuted in Aero #1 (2018), created by writer Zhou Liefen and artist Keng. The first issue of Aero was released in English on July 3, 2019. Lei Ling later appeared in the 2019 Agent of Atlas series. The second issue of Aero was released in English on August 7, 2019.

== Plot ==
In her civilian life, Lei Ling is an architect who helped build the city of Shanghai’s modern cityscape. However, she is also the superheroine Aero, and uses her powers of wind manipulation, flight, and the ability to detect and see the chi of others to battle supernatural threats to the city. The story follows Ling's attempts to balance life with her doting boyfriend Zou (who disapproves of her superhero life) with her life as a superheroine, while the city around her is attacked by her former mentor, the mysterious Madame Huang, who utilises crystalline warriors and the ability to control buildings to wreak untold destruction for an as-yet-unknown purpose.

== Characters ==
- Lei Ling – The titular superheroine Aero, she is a young but experienced architect who leads a double life protecting the city of Shanghai as a superheroine.
- Zou Yu – Ling's doting boyfriend, and a biologist at the National Institute of Science and Technology. He does not know that she and Aero are one and the same, though strongly suspects that this may be the case, enough to ask her directly in the first issue. Despite loving Ling dearly, he does not approve of Aero's methods or supports her as a superheroine. He plans to propose to Lei.
- Madame Huang – A mysterious former teacher of Lei's who has been planting destructive crystals across Shanghai. She serves as the main antagonist of the series.
- Keystone – Madame Huang's new apprentice, he is an aggressive partially human crystalline warrior, with over half of his body made of rock.

== List of volumes ==
- Volume 1 – Before The Storm – Published February 12, 2020. Collects Issues 1 to 6. Architect and superheroine Lei Ling, aka Aero, is forced to battle the very buildings she created, as they are animated by a mysterious force into living weapons of destruction. After dealing with the sentient buildings, a mile-long city appears in the sky and threatens to destroy Shanghai. Aero follows the chi of the city's controller to uncover the true mastermind of the destruction, only to learn that it is her former teacher, Madame Huang, who for as-yet unknown reasons is planning to destroy the city. When she attempts to defeat her former master, she is set upon by Huang's new apprentice Keystone, a half-man, half-rock monstrosity, who after an intense fight sends her crashing through a wall into her old office at the Sacred Tree Studio. In an interspaced flashback sequence that gradually takes over as the main plotline, several months earlier, Lei flies across the city for a date with her boyfriend Zou Yu, at an expensive tower-top restaurant. It is clear that Zou intends to propose marriage to her, but before he has a chance, a series of tornadoes suddenly appear and wreak havoc on the adjacent river. Needing to stop the tornadoes to rescue the people on a nearby ferry, Lei leaves to “powder her nose”, and uses her powers to dissipate the tornado, only for countless other tornadoes to spontaneously generate. After much struggle, Lei realises that a white jade tower that had formed in the middle of the river is to blame, and after battling a group of crystalline monsters that came from the tower, she approaches the tower and notices that the top piece is separate from the rest. After removing the top piece, the tower crumbles into the river, destroying all of the crystalline warriors. The battle won, Lei returns to her date only to be asked by Zou if she is Aero. Lying to Zou, she is shocked to learn that he is not a fan of Aero's methods. The next day, white jade towers erupt across the entire city, and Madame Huang introduces herself at Lei Ling's office.
- Volume 2 – The Mystery of Madame Huang – Published January 6, 2021.

== Reception ==
=== Critical response ===
Comic Book Resources ranked Lei Ling 6th in their "10 Heroes The Avengers Should Recruit" list, and 15th in their "Marvel: The 15 Strongest New Heroes" list.

== Literary reception ==
=== Volumes ===
==== Aero (2019) ====
According to Previews World, Lei Ling "garnered millions of readers when her series initially launched in China." According to Diamond Comic Distributors, Aero Vol. 1 Before The Storm (TPB) was the 138th best selling graphic novel in February 2020.

===== Issue 1 =====
According to Diamond Comic Distributors, Aero #1 was the 12th best selling comic book in July 2019. Aero #1 was the 120th best selling comic book in 2019.

Joe Grunenwald of Comics Beat asserted, "Overall Aero #1 does a nice job introducing English-reading audiences to two new international heroes they may not have met before. Pak presents a pair of entertaining stories, and the art on both tales fits the flavor of each piece well. If you’re in the market for some superheroes who don’t look like most other superhero out there, this book should leave you satisfied."

===== Issue 2 =====
According to Diamond Comic Distributors, Aero #2 was the 122nd-124th best selling comic book in August 2019.

Matthew Aguilar of ComicBook.com gave Aero #2 a grade of 4 out of 5 stars, saying, "Aero showed promise with its first issue, but the second issue delivers far more than just promise. The book kicks off with absolutely stunning visuals from Keng and a story by Zhou Liefen and Greg Pak that starts to pull back the layers to both Aero's personality and her impressive power set. Her nemesis is quite compelling too, and their battle hints at even bigger things to come. After that Pak, artist Pop Mhan, and colorist Federico Blee are up to bat, and while the visuals aren't quite as strong here, they do fit the type of story Pak is trying to tell. This story's much more focused on Wave, but in just a few pages you end up with a much more well rounded picture of who she is, what she's been through, and the heart of gold underneath all the pain. It might have started out a little slow, but here Aero is truly starting to hit its stride, and we're quickly becoming big fans of the hero and her amazing world."

== In other media ==
=== Video games ===
- Lei Ling / Aero appears in the digital collectible card game Marvel Snap.
