= X-Men: Phoenix – Warsong =

American comic book series

X-Men: Phoenix - Warsong
- Promotional art for X-Men: Phoenix - Warsong #1. Art by Marc Silvestri.

Publication information
- Publisher: Marvel Comics
- Schedule: Monthly
- Format: Limited series
- Genre: Superhero
- Publication date: November 2006 - March 2007
- No. of issues: 5
- Main character(s): X-Men; Phoenix Force; Stepford Cuckoos

Creative team
- Written by: Greg Pak
- Penciller: Tyler Kirkham
- Inker: Sal Regla
- Letterer: Troy Peteri
- Colorist: John Starr
- Editor(s): Nick Lowe; Mike Marts; Sean Ryan

Collected editions
- Hardcover: ISBN 0-7851-1930-2

X-Men: Phoenix – Warsong is an American five-issue comic book limited series released in 2006, beginning in September. The series is a sequel to X-Men: Phoenix - Endsong. It is written by Greg Pak and illustrated by Tyler Kirkham.

In an interview, Pak said "This is not a Jean Grey resurrection story."

A hardcover "Marvel Premiere Edition" was released on July 18, 2007, compiling all five issues.

== Plot ==
The story revolves around the Stepford Cuckoos and includes the team from Astonishing X-Men.

In the first issue, a piece of the Phoenix Force attaches itself to the three remaining Stepford Cuckoos, amplifies their telepathic power, and gives them the power of telekinesis. With their newfound abilities, the girls overcome Emma Frost's psychic detention and resurrect their deceased sisters Esme and Sophie. Kid Omega also wakes, once again, from his stasis in Beast's lab.

In the second issue, several revelations come to the forefront: both for the audience, as well as the Cuckoos themselves. It is shown that the girls' bones are actually composed of or bonded to a yet-to-be disclosed metal. We also learn that they have the ability to mentally communicate with each other in binary language, at a rate too rapid for other telepaths to decipher. Emma goes on to discover that the girls had placed all of the X-Men, including its most powerful telepaths, into a looping psionic memory-block which would disable their linear thought process whenever they began to question the Cuckoos' origin. And finally, the episode concludes with the Three-In-One's discovery that they're only three of nearly a thousand identical female units—the remainder residing in individual incubation chambers hidden within an underground laboratory. The two deceased Cuckoos, now undead but still decayed, appear and are more aware of the unfolding events than the Three-In-One.

In the third issue, it was revealed that Emma's ova were the genetic templates used to clone the hundreds of identical telepaths; including the Stepford Cuckoos. They were harvested from her by John Sublime, the director of Weapon Plus, at some point during her coma following the death of the original Hellions. The clones begin to refer to Frost as "mother", a title which she later accepts. It was also shown that Celeste now wields the Phoenix Force.

The fourth issue reveals the Cuckoo's original purpose. It is shown that the cloned sisters serve as telepathic antennae, their sheer number granting them projection and reception capabilities at a global range. The Three-In-One were to be linked with three egg-like compartments of the machinery which binds the clones, acting as its focal point. With all three Cuckoos focusing the combined power of their thousandfold sisters, they would have the ability to obliterate any number of mental signatures that they chose — in essence, giving them the ability to simultaneously eliminate all of mutantkind, worldwide, by simply concentrating on mutants' unique mental wavelengths. Many may notice the similarity between this plotline and that outlined by the second X-Men movie, X-Men 2: X-Men United; though here, the Three-In-One replace Professor X and their myriad of cloned sisters replace the duplicated Cerebro.

The issue goes on to reveal that the Celeste/Phoenix combination has manifested for the purpose of destroying the Cuckoo clones; the entity wasting no time in incinerating Esme, Sophie, and the deformed rejected clones. To stop its activities, Emma enters into the egg-like compartment meant for Celeste; and syncing with Mindee and Phoebe, she uses her significantly more refined abilities to disconnect the factions of Celeste's brain which grant her access to both her psionic powers and the Phoenix force fragment. Emma then settles to comfort her barely conscious daughter, only to be ambushed with tentacle-like extensions of Sublime's machine. Impaling Celeste, the machine absorbs a backlash of her residual Phoenix energy, which immediately disperses to all of the cloned units as well. Upon the issue's conclusion; the audience is left with a scene depicting each one of the cloned units, as well as the Three-In-One, now seemingly empowered by the Phoenix fragment.

The five-part series concludes with the girls now referring to themselves as the Thousand-in-One and under Sublime's control. The cosmically-empowered psychics proceed to enact their programmed destiny of mutant destruction. Celeste however, is still in partial control of both her own and her sisters' supermind, and alerts the X-Men that they can short-circuit the girls' linkage by destroying Sublime's machinery, which they do. Phoebe, distraught at having lost access to the cosmic power, sends a concentrated bolt of her last remaining energy through the facility's floor, prompting an explosion that would destroy everything within a half-mile radius. Celeste, at Emma's behest, accepts her role as a Phoenix host, and stops the explosion by temporarily freezing localized time. She then goes on to destroy the thousand-strong Cuckoo clones by shattering their newly manifested diamond forms before casting the entity out of her body. However, it refuses to depart the area, to which Celeste reacts by reabsorbing the force into her own and her two remaining sisters' diamond hearts. Unlike their mother's diamond composition, the Cuckoo's hearts haven't a single flaw, and as such, nothing can destroy, enter, or escape them, even the splintered Phoenix itself. The price the sisters must pay for this is that they can never again feel emotion, thus leaving them even more cold-hearted and detached from their fellow man than they were before. The storyline ends with Emma sitting alone outside of the X-Mansion, staring into the night sky and promising retribution to the Phoenix Entity for exterminating her cloned progeny should it ever return to Earth.

== Collected editions ==
The series has been collected into a hardcover volume in July 2007 (ISBN 0-7851-1930-2) and a softcover in January 2008 (ISBN 0-7851-1931-0).
