= Greg Pak =

American film director and comic book writer

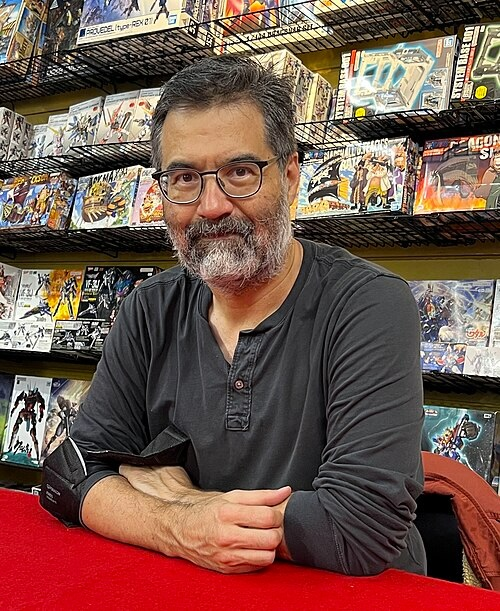
- Pak at a signing for Return to Planet Hulk at Midtown Comics in Manhattan
- Born: Dallas, Texas U.S.
- Education: New York University; University of Oxford; Yale University
- Occupations: Writer, comics creator, film director
- Employer(s): DC Comics; Marvel Comics
- Known for: Action Comics; Batman/Superman; Planet Hulk; World War Hulk; Incredible Hercules; Weapon H Superman: Doomed; John Wick
- Awards: Rhodes Scholar
- Website: Official website

Greg Pak is an American comic book writer and film director. He is best known for his work on books published by Marvel Comics, including X-Men (most notably X-Treme X-Men), several titles featuring the Hulk, and Hercules. In 2019, Pak began writing Star Wars comics for Marvel.

== Early life ==
Pak was born in Dallas, Texas, to a Korean-American father and a white mother. He graduated from Hillcrest High School. He studied political science at Yale University, where he wrote for the campus humor magazine, The Yale Record, and was a member of the Purple Crayon improvisational group. In 1991, he went to study history at Oxford University as a Rhodes Scholar with the intent of becoming a politician. He then entered New York University's graduate film program.

== Career ==
Pak's New York University (NYU) student film, Fighting Grandpa, which centered on his Korean grandparents, won the gold medal at the 25th Student Academy Awards. His short film "Asian Pride Porn", starring playwright David Henry Hwang and director Michael Kang, was licensed to Atom Films. Pak wrote and directed the feature film Robot Stories. He collected his screenplays in the book Robot Stories & More Screenplays, whose foreword was written by David Henry Hwang.

Pak worked as the cinematographer on the 1998 documentary short The Personals: Improvisations on Romance in the Golden Years, which was directed by his wife, Keiko Ibi. In March 1999, the film received an Academy Award for Documentary Short Subject at the 71st Academy Awards.

Pak began writing for Marvel Comics in September 2004, with a 4-issue Warlock series, and signed an exclusive deal with them in July 2005. In a story in 2005's Amazing Fantasy vol. 2 #15 he and artist Takeshi Miyazawa created Amadeus Cho.

Pak helmed the year-long Planet Hulk story arc in the pages of The Incredible Hulk in 2006 & 2007, beginning with #92 and concluding with #105. After the ensuing World War Hulk event in 2007, where he wrote the primary miniseries as well as the core tie-ins issues of Incredible Hulk (#106-111).

He continued onto the Incredible Hercules series, joined by co-writer Fred Van Lente, which continued the now-defunct Incredible Hulk's numbering, as well as the spinoff series World War Hulk Aftersmash - Warbound and Skaar: Son of Hulk, The adventures of Incredible Hercules (alongside Amadeus Cho) would culminate with Chaos War in late 2010/early 2011 after which the series was concluded. Pak returned for a solo Hercules comic some months later, initially tying into the Thor-centric Fear Itself series, which ended in early 2012.

Other 2000s Marvel projects include Phoenix: Endsong, Phoenix: Warsong, Iron Man, Magneto: Testament and War Machine.

At the same time as his Planet / World War Hulk run, Pak also wrote Dynamite Entertainment's initial series based on the Sci-Fi Channel's Battlestar Galactica.

Pak is one of the featured contributors to Secret Identities: The Asian American Superhero Anthology.

In June 2013, Pak began writing Batman/Superman for DC Comics, which he wrote for the majority of its run (26 out of 32 issues). From late 2013 to 2015, he wrote Action Comics.

Pak would return to the world of the Incredible Hulk in 2016, scripting The Totally Awesome Hulk, in which Amadeus Cho was now imbued with the Hulk's powers. The series lasted 23 issues before being replaced with the original Incredible Hulk series (restarting its legacy numbering at #709), though its revival (and Cho's time as the "primary" Hulk) was brief as the series concluded with #717. Pak returned to the world of Planet Hulk once more with 2022-2023's Planet Hulk Worldbreaker miniseries.

During this time Pak also helped briefly revive Alpha Flight in 2011, created Weapon H (with Mike Deodato Jr.) in 2017, and wrote a 12-issue Weapon H series (as well as a tie-in Hulkverines miniseries) in 2018. He also returned to Dynamite in 2017 and wrote a 5-issue John Wick comic series.

In 2019 Pak would help bring the characters Aero and Sword Master into the Marvel Universe proper, initially created in Chinese digital comics the previous year. He translated the original comics and wrote new stories for the year long Aero and Sword Master series. Pak also wrote a new series of Agents of Atlas comics, which would feature Aero and Sword-Master interacting with other young Marvel heroes, including Wave, White Fox and Amadeus Cho. The team was last seen confronting Namor the Sub-Mariner in Greg Pak's Atlantis Attacks miniseries of 2020.

In 2023 Pak wrote an educational comic book entitled Who Belongs?, drawn by Jeremy Arambulo, colored by Irma Kniivila, and lettered by Janice Chiang. This project was part of an AAPI Hidden Voices series from the New York City Department of Education’s Civics for All Comics Group.

== Filmography ==
- Robot Stories (2003)
- Po Mo Knock Knock (1999)
- Mouse (short) (1997)

== Bibliography ==
=== Marvel Comics ===
- Warlock vol. 5 #1-4 (with Charlie Adlard, 2004)
- X-Men:
  - X-Men: Phoenix - Endsong #1-5 (with Greg Land, 2005)
  - X-Men: Phoenix - Warsong #1-5 (with Tyler Kirkham, 2006–2007)
  - Magneto: Testament #1-5 (with Carmine Di Giandomenico, 2008–2009)
  - Astonishing X-Men #44-47, 60-61 (with Mike McKone and various, 2012–2013)
  - X-Treme X-Men #1-13 (with various, 2012–2013)
  - Storm #1-11 (with various, 2014–2015)
  - Weapon X #1-27 (with Greg Land, 2017–2019)
  - X-Men Prime #1 (with various, 2017)
  - Weapons of Mutant Destruction: Alpha #1 (with Mahmud Asrar, 2017)
- Marvel Nemesis: The Imperfects #1-6 (with Renato Arlem, 2005)
- Iron Man: House of M #1-3 (with Pat Lee, 2005)
- Marvel 1602: New World #1-5 (with Greg Tocchini, 2005)
- What If: Submariner (with David Lopez, 2006)
- Amazing Fantasy vol. 2 #15 (with Patrick Scherberger, 2006)
- Hulk:
  - Incredible Hulk vol. 2 #92-111 (with various, 2006–2007)
  - Incredible Hulk #601-611, 709-717 (with various, 2009-2010, 2017-2018)
  - Incredible Hulks #612-635 (with various, 2010-2011)
  - The Totally Awesome Hulk #1–23 (with Frank Cho, December 2015 – 2017)
  - Giant Size Hulk #1 (with various, 2006)
  - Planet Hulk Gladiator Guidebook (with co-author Anthony Flamini, 2006)
  - What If: Planet Hulk
  - World War Hulk #1-5 (with John Romita, Jr., 2007–2008)
  - World War Hulk: After Smash (with Rafa Sandoval, 2008)
  - World War Hulk: Warbound #1-5 (with Leonard Kirk and Rafa Sandoval, 2008)
  - Skaar: Son of Hulk #1-12 (with Ron Garney, 2008-2009)
  - Skaar: Son of Hulk Presents - Savage World of Sakaar (with various, 2008)
  - Planet Skaar Prologue (with Dan Panosian, 2009)
  - Dark Reign: The List - Hulk (with Ben Oliver, 2009)
  - Generations: Banner Hulk & The Totally Awesome Hulk (with Matteo Buffagni, 2017)
  - Weapon H #1–12 (with various, 2018-2019)
  - Hulkverines #1-3 (with Ario Anindito, 2019)
- Hercules:
  - Incredible Hercules #112-141 (with co-author Fred Van Lente and various, 2008–2010)
  - Hulk vs Hercules: When Titans Collide (with co-author Fred Van Lente and various, 2008)
  - Assault on New Olympus #1 (with co-author Fred Van Lente and Rodney Buchemi, 2009)
  - Thor & Hercules: Encyclopædia Mythologica (with co-authors Fred Van Lente, Paul Cornell and Anthony Flamini, 2009)
  - Hercules: Fall of an Avenger #1-2 (with co-author Fred Van Lente and art by Ariel Olivetti, 2010)
  - Heroic Age: Prince of Power #1-4 (with co-author Fred Van Lente and art by Reilly Brown, 2010)
  - Chaos War #1-5 (with co-author Fred Van Lente and art by Khoi Pham, 2010–2011)
  - Herc #1-10, #6.1 (with co-author Fred Van Lente and art by Cliff Richards, 2011)
- War Machine #0-12 (with Leonardo Manco, 2008-2009)
- Alpha Flight vol. 4 #0.1, 1-8 (with co-author Fred Van Lente and art by Dale Eaglesham, 2012)
- Silver Surfer vol. 6 #1-5 (with various, 2011)
- Red Skull #1-5 (with Mirko Colak, 2011)
- Agents of Atlas
  - War of the Realms: The New Agents of Atlas #1-4 (art by Gang Hyuk Lim, May - June 2019)
  - Agents of Atlas vol. 3 #1-5 (with Jeff Parker, art by Gang Hyuk Lim and Carlo Pagulayan, August - December 2019)
  - Atlantis Attacks #1-5 (2020)
  - Aero #1-6 (with co-writer Zhou Liefen, art by Keng, 2019)
  - Sword Master #1-12 (with co-author Shuizhu, art by Gunji 2019-2020)
- Deadly Hands of Kung Fu: Gang War #1-3 (with Caio Majado, 2023-2024)
- Amadeus Cho 20th Anniversary Special #1 (with Takeshi Miyazawa, Creees Lee, Jethro Morales, 2025)

=== DC Comics ===
- Batman/Superman #1-9, 11–27, Annual #1-2 (with Jae Lee and various, 2013-December 2015)
- Action Comics #23.2, 25–50 (with Aaron Kuder, November 2013-March 2016)
- Secret Origins a segment in #1 (with Lee Weeks, 2014)
- Teen Titans #17–19 (with Ian Churchill, February 2016–April 2016)
- City Boy #1-6 (with Minkyu Jung and Sunny Gho, May 2023-October 2023)

=== Other publishers ===
- Boom Studios:
  - Big Trouble in Little China/Escape from New York (2016-2017)
  - Mech Cadet Yu #1-12 (with Takeshi Miyazawa and various, 2017-2018)
  - Mech Cadets #1-6 (with Takeshi Miyazawa, 2023)
  - Firefly (2018-)
  - Ronin Island #1-12 (with Giannis Milonogiannis and Irma Knivilla, 2019-2020)
- Dark Horse Comics
  - Kingsway West (with Mirko Colak, 2016-2017)
- Dynamite Entertainment:
  - Battlestar Galactica #0-12 (with Nigel Raynor, 2006–2007)
  - Turok: Dinosaur Hunter #1-12 (with various artists, 2014-2015)
  - John Wick #1-5 (with Giovanni Valletta and Matt Gaudio, 2017-2019)
  - James Bond (2018-)
  - Lilo & Stitch (2024)
  - Supernatural (2025-)
- Kickstarter:
  - Code Monkey Save World #1(with Takeshi Miyazawa 2013)
  - Princess Who Saved Herself! (with Takeshi Miyazawa 2015)
- Valiant Comics:
  - Eternal Warrior #1-8(with Trevor Hairsine and Robert Gill, 2013–2014)

| Preceded by Daniel Way | Incredible Hulk writer 2006–2007 | Succeeded by Jeph Loeb (New Hulk series) |
| Preceded by Jeph Loeb (Hulk) | Incredible Hulks writer 2009–2011 | Succeeded by Jason Aaron (New Incredible Hulk series) |
| Preceded by James Asmus | Astonishing X-Men writer 2011–2012 | Succeeded by Marjorie Liu |
