= Weapon H =

- Weapon H. Art by Mike Deodato.

Publication information
- Publisher: Marvel Comics
- First appearance: Totally Awesome Hulk #22 (September 2017)
- Created by: Greg Pak; Mike Deodato

In-story information
- Full name: Clayton Cortez
- Species: Human mutate-cyborg
- Place of origin: Earth, America
- Team affiliations: Eaglestar; Roxxon Energy Corporation; Weapon X Project; War Avengers
- Notable aliases: H-Alpha; Hulkverine
- Abilities: Superhuman strength, durability, speed, and senses; Retractable claws; Healing factor; Probability field generation; Alternate transformation; Combat experience

Weapon H (Clayton Cortez) is a character appearing in American comic books published by Marvel Comics.

== Publication history ==
The character was created by Greg Pak and Mike Deodato, and first appeared in The Totally Awesome Hulk #21 (September 2017) during the "Weapons of Mutant Destruction" storyline.

Weapon H later received a solo series that detailed the character’s adventures since the end of the "Weapons of Mutant Destruction" storyline.

== Fictional character biography ==
=== Origin ===
Clayton Cortez is an ex-military mercenary working for Eaglestar who is hired to eliminate the villagers in Ujanka for interfering with Roxxon's pipeline work. Feeling remorse for his actions, Clayton kills his own men and spares the villagers. For his betrayal, he is kidnapped and sold to Aliana Alba of Weapon X.

=== Weapons of Mutant Destruction ===
Clayton is infused with DNA harvested from Amadeus Cho and Old Man Logan, as well as being subjected to the adamantium-bonding process and being injected with nanites reverse-engineered from Lady Deathstrike's nanites. Much of his brain is left intact so that he can be better disciplined. Clayton's hybrid form resembles a gray-skinned Hulk with retractable claws and adamantium protrusions on his back, shoulders, and legs. Eventually, Clayton is released as H-Alpha and sent to battle Amadeus and Weapon X alongside his more primitive precursor H-Beta. H-Alpha proves superior, killing H-Beta before engaging Amadeus. Clayton regains much of his humanity and flees.

Now calling himself Weapon H, Clayton sets out to find every Eaglestar facility that carried information about himself and his family. Alba catches up to him and injects nanites into his body so that he will not be able to resist her commands. He once again encounters the Weapon X team, but the new Wolverine manages to break him free.

=== Targeted by Roxxon ===
Clayton saves Roxxon scientist Ella Stirling from an Ur-Wendigo as Roxxon takes an interest in Weapon H. This also attracts the attention of Doctor Strange, who plans to deal with Weapon H and the Ur-Wendigo. Strange attempts to battle the Ur-Wendigo, but his magic does not affect it. Using Strange's Axe of Angarruumus, Weapon H enters the Ur-Wendigo's body and kills it from within.

Dario Agger unleashes a group of Brood-infected creatures to attack Weapon H. After killing the Brood, Weapon H demands answers as to why Roxxon is pursuing him. Blake, a Brood-infected human, states that Roxxon wanted Weapon H to work for them. After mentioning that those who are said to help people actually harm people, Weapon H has Blake forward a message to Roxxon to leave him alone. As Clayton is walking through Redwood National Forest, Agger has Baines awaken a spawn of Man-Thing.

When the spawn attacks Weapon H, Dario Agger speaks through his Fly-Spies, stating that the spawn had its abilities enhanced with the DNA of Groot. When Agger states that he will find out who he is and who the woman looking for him is, Weapon H sets off the Man-Thing's immolating touch, causing a fire. As Weapon H continues his fight with Man-Thing, a woman named Sonia runs into Stirling, who is also looking for Weapon H. After Weapon H subdues Man-Thing, he tells Stirling that nobody is supposed to find her, as it is confirmed that Sonia is Clayton's wife. After seeing Roxxon's Fly-Spies, Weapon H throws Sonia and Stirling into the water as he puts out the fires and defeats Man-Thing.

=== Collaborating with Roxxon ===
As Weapon H fights the security guards, he finds Blake and Man-Thing in cages and frees them. Agger arrives, wanting the group to hear him out. He explains that Roxxon intends to exploit resources from Weirdworld, which contains enough magic to power Earth for a million years. However, the monsters on the other side of the portal want to kill every human. Sonia advises Clayton to deal with the threat as he transforms into Weapon H.

Baines reveals to the group that the damage to the facility has fractured the portal, allowing creatures such as the Skrullduggers to get through. After Man-Thing secures the Skrullduggers, Captain America states to Weapon H that he was trailing illegal shipments to Roxxon. After the two defeat the Skrullduggers, they arrange to have Alpha Flight capture one for study.

==== Journey to Weirdworld ====
Weapon H hears from Korg that the Roxxon soldiers on Weirdworld are safe in a bunker. In addition, he learns that Dario Agger has brought in Titania and ex-S.H.I.E.L.D. operative Angel to assist him. After a talk with Sonia, Clayton is allowed to contact his children and mother-in-law, this being secretly arranged by Captain America. As Weapon H leads the mission to Weirdworld, they are attacked by a tribe of humanoids who blame them for breaking the Earth and allowing the Skrullduggers to take their queen.

Their captors are revealed to be the Inaku, who come from the planet of the same name and have settled on Weirdworld. While Man-Thing, Korg, and Titania stay with the Inaku, Weapon H takes Angel and Blake on a stealth mission to find the Roxxon outpost. After being contacted by Dario Agger, Weapon H tells Angel and Blake that Agger "showed his hand" by wanting them to kill the Skrullduggers. Sonia states that there are three engineers and six Roxxon guards taking refuge, with one of them being Carrie Espinoza. After a power failure at Roxxon, Agger's latest contact to Weapon H alerts the Skrullduggers outside the outpost. After killing some of the Skrullduggers, Weapon H, Angel, and Blake make their way into the Roxxon outpost to rescue its workers and discover that they are harnessing Morgan le Fay's magic.

Weapon H was against the imprisonment of Morgan le Fay despite Espinoza's claim that she is the most dangerous sorceress who ever lived. When Weapon H starts to go on the attack, Angel states that she had no knowledge of what Roxxon was doing with Morgan —who advises Weapon H not to listen to Angel's lies. After revealing parts of her backstory, Morgan states that she found a way to tame the Skrullduggers until Roxxon invaded, took her captive, and caused the Skrullduggers to run wild. As Angel tries to prevent Weapon H and Blake from falling into Morgan's control, Morgan mesmerizes them, claiming that she can cure Blake, and reveals Weapon H's true and full identity of Clayton Cortez. Espinoza then has a soldier named Granville open the door, enabling the Skrullduggers to get in. After Weapon H blocks the entrance against the Skrullduggers, Morgan exposes that Angel is Black Widow's clone using an Image Inducer, and claims that Captain America sent the clone to spy on Weapon H. Morgan still has Weapon H under her control and regains control of the Skrullduggers. After destroying the facility, Morgan leads a mind-controlled Weapon H and the Skrullduggers in an attempt at taking over the world.

Now under Morgan's control, Weapon H leads the attack on the Inaku village. As Morgan is a queen to the Inaku, they assist Weapon H in attacking Korg and Titania. As Weapon H faces off against Korg, Angel works to get Sonia to get through to Weapon H. Dario Agger takes control of the transmission, stating that he has a map to an escape route for them to use, only to lead them into a box canyon. After knocking out Agger, Sonia heads to Weirdworld to get to Weapon H. After breaking free from Morgan's control, Weapon H briefly leaves Weirdworld and returns to have Agger disarm the gun.

After getting Dario Agger to disarm the bomb, Weapon H watches as he transforms into Minotaur after taking an attack from Morgan le Fay. As Minotaur fights Morgan, Weapon H evacuates everyone through the portal. After everyone is evacuated, Weapon H is attacked by Minotaur who states that he ruined everything. As Morgan's army starts to charge them, Weapon H leaves through the portal. Minotaur barely makes it as Weapon H and Sonia make sure that he pays them the terms of their contract. Agger does provide Clay and Sonia with money to their accounts and new identities. Clay vows that if Agger does anything to his family, he will tear down everything he has.

=== Hulkverines ===
In the Hulkverines miniseries, Clayton and his family are shown watching the news of Hulk's fight with the Avengers at a restaurant. Later, he encounters and battles Hulk as it is revealed that the Leader infected Clayton with a gamma virus. Using his tracking skills, Clayton chases after Leader until he runs into Wolverine. The Leader's Humanoids kidnap Wolverine and Bruce Banner, but Weapon H defeats Leader and forces him to flee.

=== Absolute Carnage: Weapon Plus ===
As Cletus Kasady begins plotting to awaken the primordial deity Knull from his slumber, Clayton and his family take refuge in Drumheller, Alberta. Clayton later moves to New York City, where he ends up attacking a mugger who attempted to jump him while leaving a local grocery. Due to the misunderstanding he ends up coming in conflict with Black Knight. The two renounce their fight in pursuit of finding and shutting off the source of said chaos. The two come across a hidden underground chasm where cultists of Set had been storing stolen Alchemax technology. They are waylaid by the sudden appearance of Daredevil, Agent Anti-Venom, Cloak and Dagger, Conan, and Deathlok. Sensing a fellow hero in need of help, the six rally to fight against Deathlok while shutting off his rage-inducing apparatus. During the battle, Deathlok's temporal drive malfunctions, sending the heroes into the Hyborian Age far in the past.

Weapon H discovers that he can transform into versions of other gamma mutates, which he uses to assume a Harpy-like form and fly himself and Black Knight to safety. Conan's group uses the Temple of the Beast to lure Deathlok into a trap. During the fight, Weapon H siphons Deathlok's gamma battery to briefly assume a Red Hulk form. Their fight is crashed by Thulsa Doom and his minions, who capture Conan and use his blood to summon Set.

== Powers and abilities ==
The Weapon X Project's experiments have given Clayton Cortez a Hulk/Wolverine-like appearance with the combined abilities of Hulk, Wolverine, Domino, Lady Deathstrike, Sabretooth, and Warpath. These abilities include immense strength, durability, and speed, as well as retractable bone claws, regeneration, enhanced senses, and probability field generation (allowing him to influence "luck").

He possesses a couple of other unique qualities stemming from Sterntech-derived nanorobotics used in his adamantium bonding process. Without this nanotech, Cortez/Weapon H could not transform without his skeleton ripping out of the body. With it, he can manipulate the Adamantium-laced bone structure's pliability, for instance, being able to elongate them protruding along those limbs into needle-pointed spurs capable of shredding his enemies. Unlike Wolverine, Weapon H can also discharge his three-pointed claws as projectile-like stilettos and aim them at a target with pinpoint precision.

After having his gamma power drained and being left trapped in the past age by Deathlok, Cortez found out that he could modulate the Gamma Core powering this Sterntech-based transformation and transform into alternate forms of gamma mutates.

Prior to his transformations, the Eaglestar Corporation had trained Clayton as a skilled marksman and expert unarmed combatant.

== In other media ==
- Weapon H appears as a boss in Marvel Future Revolution.
- Weapon H appears as a card in Marvel Snap.

== Collected editions ==
Title	Material collected	Publication date	ISBN
Weapons Of Mutant Destruction	Weapons of Mutant Destruction: Alpha #1, Weapon X (vol. 3) #5-6, Totally Awesome Hulk #20-22	November 2017	978-1302910853
Weapon X Vol. 2: The Hunt for Weapon H	Weapon X (vol. 3) #7-11	March 2018	978-1302907358
Weapon H Vol. 1: AWOL	Weapon H #1–6	November 2018	978-1302912284
Weapon H Vol. 2: War for Weirdworld	Weapon H #7-12	April 2019	978-1302912291
Hulkverines	Hulkverines #1-3, Totally Awesome Hulk #22	June 2019	978-1302918354
