= List of Marvel Comics publications (D–E) =

Marvel Comics is an American comic book company dating to 1961. This is a list of the publications it has released in its history under the "Marvel Comics" imprint. The list does not include collected editions; trade paperbacks; digital comics; free, promotional giveaways; sketchbooks; poster books or magazines, nor does it include series published by other Marvel imprints such as Epic, Icon or Star. It also does not include titles published by Marvel's pre-1961 predecessors Timely Comics and Atlas Comics.

- List of Marvel Comics publications (A)
- List of Marvel Comics publications (B–C)
- List of Marvel Comics publications (F–G)
- List of Marvel Comics publications (H–L)
- List of Marvel Comics publications (M)
- List of Marvel Comics publications (N–R)
- List of Marvel Comics publications (S)
- List of Marvel Comics publications (T–V)
- List of Marvel Comics publications (W–Z)

== D ==
Title	Series	Issues	Dates	Notes	Reference
D.P.7		#1–32	Nov 1986 – Jun 1989		
D.P.7		Annual #1	1987		
Daffodil		#1–3	2010	limited series	
Daily Bugle		#1–3	Dec 1996 – Feb 1997	limited series	
Daken: Dark Wolverine		#1–23; 9.1	Nov 2010 – May 2012		
Dakota North		#1–5	Jun 1986 – Feb 1987	limited series	
Damage Control	vol. 1	#1–4	May 1989 – Aug 1989	limited series	
Damage Control	vol. 2	#1–4	Dec 1989 – Feb 1990	limited series	
Damage Control	vol. 3	#1–4	Jun 1991 – Sep 1991	limited series	
Damage Control	vol. 4	#1–5	Oct 2022 – Feb 2023	limited series	
Damnation: Johnny Blaze - Ghost Rider		#1	May 2018	one-shot	
Dances with Demons		#1–4	Sep 1993 – Dec 1993	limited series	
Danny Ketch: Ghost Rider		#1–4	Jul 2023 – Oct 2023	limited series	
Daredevil	vol. 1	#1–380 -1	Apr 1964 – Oct 1998		
Daredevil	vol. 1	Annual #1–10	1967 – 1994	#5 was misnumbered as #4	
Daredevil	vol. 1	Giant-Size #1	1975		
Daredevil	vol. 1	Daredevil/Deadpool '97	1997	Annual	
Daredevil	vol. 2	#1–119; 500–512	Nov 1998 – Feb 2011	issues #22–81 are dual numbered as #402–461 series renumbered after #119 to #500	
Daredevil	vol. 2	Annual #1	Dec 2007		
Daredevil	vol. 3	#1–36; 10.1	Sep 2011 – Apr 2014		
Daredevil	vol. 3	Annual #1	Oct 2012		
Daredevil	vol. 4	#1–18; 1.50; 15.1	May 2014 – Nov 2015		
Daredevil	vol. 5	#1–28	Feb 2016 – Dec 2017		
Daredevil	vol. 5	Annual #1	Oct 2016		
Daredevil	vol. 6	#595–612	Jan 2018 – Mar 2019	numbering continued from vol. 1	
Daredevil	vol. 6	Annual #1	Oct 2018		
Daredevil	vol. 7	#1–36	Apr 2019 – Feb 2022		
Daredevil	vol. 7	Annual #1	Oct 2020		
Daredevil	vol. 8	#1–14	Sep 2022 – Oct 2023		
Daredevil	vol. 9	#1–25	Nov 2023 – Nov 2025		
Daredevil	vol. 10	#1–	Jun 2026 – present		
Daredevil	Battlin' Jack Murdock	#1–4	Aug 2007 – Nov 2007	limited series	
Daredevil	Black & White	#1	Oct 2010	one-shot	
Daredevil	Black Armor	#1–4	Jan 2024 – Apr 2024	limited series	
Daredevil	Blood of the Tarantula	#1	Jun 2008	one-shot	
Daredevil	Cage Match	#1	Jul 2010	one-shot	
Daredevil	Cold Day in Hell	#1–3	Jun 2025 – Oct 2025	limited series	
Daredevil	Dark Nights	#1–8	Aug 2013 – Mar 2014	limited series	
Daredevil	End of Days	#1–8	Dec 2012 – Aug 2013	limited series	
Daredevil	Father	#1–6	Jun 2004 – Feb 2007	limited series	
Daredevil	Ninja	#1–3	Dec 2000 – May 2001	limited series	
Daredevil	Noir	#1–4	Jun 2009 – Sep 2009	limited series	
Daredevil	Reborn	#1–4	Mar 2011 – Jul 2011	limited series	
Daredevil	Redemption	#1–6	Apr 2005 – Aug 2005	limited series	
Daredevil	The Man Without Fear	#1–5	Oct 1993 – Feb 1994	limited series	
Daredevil	The Movie	#1	Mar 2003	adaptation of 2003 film	
Daredevil	The Target	#1	Jan 2003	also known as Daredevil/Bullseye: The Target; intended as a limited series but only one issue was released	
Daredevil	Unleash Hell	#1–5	Mar 2025 – Jul 2025	limited series; also known as Daredevil: Unleash Hell - Red Band	
Daredevil	Yellow	#1–6	Aug 2001 – Jan 2002	limited series	
Daredevil/	Batman		Jan 1997	one-shot; co-published with DC	
Daredevil/	Punisher: Seventh Circle	#1–4	Jul 2016 – Oct 2016	limited series	
Daredevil/	Punisher: The Devil's Trigger	#1–5	Jan 2026 – May 2026	limited series	
Daredevil/	Shi	#1	Feb 1997	one-shot; co-published with Crusade Comics	
Daredevil/	Spider-Man	#1–4	Jan 2001 – Apr 2001	limited series	
Daredevil 2099		#1	Nov 2004	one-shot	
Daredevil & Captain America: Dead on Arrival		#1	Nov 2008	one-shot	
Daredevil & Echo		#1–4	Jul 2023 – Oct 2023	limited series	
Daredevil vs. Punisher		#1–6	Sep 2005 – Jan 2006	limited series	
Daredevil: Woman Without Fear	vol. 1	#1–3	Mar 2022 – May 2022	limited series	
Daredevil: Woman Without Fear	vol. 2	#1–4	Sep 2024 – Dec 2024	limited series	
Daring Mystery Comics 70th Anniversary Special		#1	Nov 2009	one-shot	
Dark Ages		#1–6	Nov 2021 – May 2022	limited series	
Dark Agnes		#1–2	Apr 2020 – May 2020	limited series; also known as Robert E. Howard's Dark Agnes; originally solicited as 5-issue series	
Dark Angel		#6–16	Dec 1992 – Dec 1993	continued from Hell's Angel	
Dark Avengers	vol. 1	#1–16	Mar 2009 – Jul 2010	Dark Reign tie-in	
Dark Avengers	vol. 1	Annual #1	Feb 2010		
Dark Avengers	vol. 2	#175–190	Aug 2012 – Jul 2013	continued from Thunderbolts vol. 2	
Dark Avengers	Ares	#1–3	Dec 2009 – Feb 2010	limited series	
Dark Avengers	Uncanny X-Men: Exodus	#1	Nov 2009	one-shot	
Dark Avengers	Uncanny X-Men: Utopia	#1	Aug 2009	one-shot	
The Dark Crystal		#1–2	Apr 1983 – May 1983	limited series; movie adaptation	
Dark Guard		#1–4	Oct 1993 – Jan 1994	limited series	
Dark Reign	Elektra	#1–5	May 2009 – Oct 2009	limited series	
Dark Reign	Fantastic Four	#1–5	May 2009 – Sep 2009	limited series	
Dark Reign	Files	#1	Apr 2009	one-shot	
Dark Reign	Hawkeye	#1–5	Jun 2009 – Mar 2010	limited series	
Dark Reign	Lethal Legion	#1–3	Aug 2009 – Oct 2009	limited series	
Dark Reign	Made Men	#1	Nov 2009	one-shot	
Dark Reign	Mister Negative	#1–3	Aug 2009 – Oct 2009	limited series	
Dark Reign	New Nation	#1	Feb 2009	one-shot	
Dark Reign	Sinister Spider-Man	#1–4	Aug 2009 – Nov 2009	limited series	
Dark Reign	The Cabal	#1	Jun 2009	one-shot	
Dark Reign	The Goblin Legacy	#1	Sep 2009	one-shot	
Dark Reign	The Hood	#1–5	Jul 2009 – Nov 2009	limited series	
Dark Reign	Young Avengers	#1–5	Jul 2009 – Dec 2009	limited series	
Dark Reign	Zodiac	#1–3	Aug 2009 – Nov 2009	limited series	
Dark Reign: The List	Amazing Spider-Man	#1	Jan 2010	one-shot	
Dark Reign: The List	Avengers	#1	Nov 2009	one-shot	
Dark Reign: The List	Daredevil	#1	Nov 2009	one-shot	
Dark Reign: The List	Hulk	#1	Dec 2009	one-shot	
Dark Reign: The List	Punisher	#1	Dec 2009	one-shot	
Dark Reign: The List	Secret Warriors	#1	Dec 2009	one-shot	
Dark Reign: The List	Wolverine	#1	Dec 2009	one-shot	
Dark Reign: The List	X-Men	#1	Nov 2009	one-shot	
The Dark Tower	Battle of Jericho Hill	#1–5	Dec 2009 – Apr 2010	limited series	
The Dark Tower	End-World Almanac	#1	Jul 2008	one-shot	
The Dark Tower	Fall of Gilead	#1–6	May 2009 – Nov 2009	limited series	
The Dark Tower	Guide to Gilead	#1	Jun 2009	one-shot	
The Dark Tower	The Gunslinger Born	#1–7	Feb 2007 – Aug 2007	limited series	
The Dark Tower	Gunslinger's Guidebook		Aug 2007	one-shot	
The Dark Tower	The Long Road Home	#1–5	Mar 2008 – Jul 2008	limited series	
The Dark Tower	The Sorcerer	#1	Apr 2009	one-shot	
The Dark Tower	Treachery	#1–6	Sep 2008 – Feb 2009	limited series	
The Dark Tower: The Drawing of the Three	Bitter Medicine	#1–5	Apr 2016 – Aug 2016	limited series	
The Dark Tower: The Drawing of the Three	House of Cards	#1–5	Mar 2015 – Jul 2015	limited series	
The Dark Tower: The Drawing of the Three	Lady of Shadows	#1–5	Sep 2015 – Jan 2016	limited series	
The Dark Tower: The Drawing of the Three	The Prisoner	#1–5	Sep 2014 – Nov 2014	limited series	
The Dark Tower: The Drawing of the Three	The Sailor	#1–5	Oct 2016 – Feb 2017	limited series	
The Dark Tower: The Gunslinger	Evil Ground	#1–2	Apr 2013 – Jun 2013	limited series	
The Dark Tower: The Gunslinger	Sheemie's Tale	#1–2	Jan 2013 – Feb 2013	limited series	
The Dark Tower: The Gunslinger	So Fell Lord Perth	#1	Aug 2013	one-shot	
The Dark Tower: The Gunslinger	The Battle of Tull	#1–5	Jun 2011 – Oct 2011	limited series	
The Dark Tower: The Gunslinger	The Journey Begins	#1–5	May 2010 – Sep 2010	limited series	
The Dark Tower: The Gunslinger	The Little Sisters of Eluria	#1–5	Dec 2010 – Apr 2011	limited series	
The Dark Tower: The Gunslinger	The Man in Black	#1–5	Jun 2012 – Oct 2012	limited series	
The Dark Tower: The Gunslinger	The Way Station	#1–5	Dec 2011 – Apr 2012	limited series	
Dark Web		#1	Feb 2023	one-shot	
Dark Web	Finale	#1	Apr 2023	one-shot	
Dark Web	Ms. Marvel	#1–2	Feb 2023 – Mar 2023	limited series	
Dark Web	X-Men	#1–3	Feb 2023 – Mar 2023	limited series	
Dark Wolverine		#75–90	Aug 2009 – Oct 2010	continued from Wolverine vol. 3; Dark Reign tie-in	
Dark X-Men	vol. 1	#1–5	Jan 2010 – May 2010	limited series; Dark Reign tie-in	
Dark X-Men	vol. 2	#1–5	Oct 2023 – Feb 2024	limited series; Fall of X tie-in	
Dark X-Men	The Beginning	#1–3	Sep 2009 – Oct 2009	limited series	
Dark X-Men	The Confession	#1	Nov 2009	one-shot	
Darkdevil		#1–3	Nov 2000 – Jan 2001	limited series	
Darkhawk	vol. 1	#1–50	Mar 1991 – Apr 1995		
Darkhawk	vol. 1	#51	Jan 2018	one-shot; part of Marvel Legacy event	
Darkhawk	vol. 1	Annual #1–3	1992 – 1994		
Darkhawk	vol. 2	#1–5	Oct 2021 – Mar 2022	limited series	
Darkhawk	Heart of the Hawk	#1	Jun 2021	one-shot	
The Darkhold	Alpha	#1	Nov 2021	one-shot	
The Darkhold	Black Bolt	#1	Feb 2022	one-shot	
The Darkhold	Blade	#1	Dec 2021	one-shot	
The Darkhold	Iron Man	#1	Dec 2021	one-shot	
The Darkhold	Omega	#1	Mar 2022	one-shot	
The Darkhold	Spider-Man	#1	Feb 2022	one-shot	
The Darkhold	Wasp	#1	Jan 2022	one-shot	
Darkhold: Pages from the Book of Sins		#1–16	Oct 1992 – Jan 1994		
Darkman	vol. 1	#1–3	Oct 1990 – Nov 1990	limited series; adaptation of the 1990 movie	
Darkman	vol. 2	#1–6	Apr 1993 – Sep 1993	limited series	
The Darkness/The Incredible Hulk		#1	Jul 2004	one-shot; co-published with Image Comics and Top Cow Productions	
The Darkness/Wolverine		#1	Sep 2006	one-shot; co-published with Image Comics and Top Cow Productions	
Darkseid vs. Galactus: The Hunger			Aug 1995	one-shot; co-published with DC	
Darkstar and the Winter Guard		#1–3	Aug 2010	limited series	
Darth Vader	vol. 1	#1–25	Apr 2015 – Dec 2016		
Darth Vader	vol. 1	Annual #1	Feb 2016		
Darth Vader	vol. 2	#1–25	Aug 2017 – Feb 2019		
Darth Vader	vol. 2	Annual #2	Sep 2018		
Daughters of the Dragon		#1–6	Mar 2006 – Aug 2006	limited series	
Day of the Defenders		#1	Mar 2001	one-shot	
Daydreamers		#1–3	Aug 1997 – Oct 1997	limited series	
Dazzler	vol. 1	#1–42	Mar 1981 – Mar 1986		
Dazzler	vol. 2	#1	Jul 2010	one-shot	
Dazzler	vol. 3	#1–4	Nov 2024 – Feb 2025	limited series	
Dazzler	X-Song	#1	Aug 2018	one-shot	
Dead Man Logan		#1–12	Jan 2019 – Dec 2019	limited series	
Dead of Night		#1–11	Dec 1973 – Aug 1975		
Dead of Night	Featuring Devil-Slayer	#1–4	Nov 2008 – Feb 2009	limited series	
Dead of Night	Featuring Man-Thing	#1–4	Apr 2008 – Jul 2008	limited series	
Dead of Night	Featuring Werewolf by Night	#1–4	Mar 2009 – Jun 2009	limited series	
Dead X-Men		#1–4	Mar 2024 – Jun 2024	limited series; Fall of the House of X tie-in	
Deadline		#1–4	Jun 2002 – Sep 2002	limited series	
Deadly Foes of Spider-Man		#1–4	May 1991 – Aug 1991	limited series	
Deadly Hands of K'un-Lun		#1–5	Apr 2026 – Aug 2026	limited series	
Deadly Hands of Kung Fu		#1–4	Jul 2014 – Oct 2014	limited series	
Deadly Neighborhood Spider-Man		#1–5	Dec 2022 – Apr 2023	limited series	
Deadpool	vol. 1	#1–4	Aug 1994 – Nov 1994	limited series	
Deadpool	vol. 2	#1–69 -1	Jan 1997 – Sep 2002		
Deadpool	vol. 2	Deadpool/Death '98	1998	Annual	
Deadpool	vol. 3	#1–63; 33.1, 49.1	Nov 2008 – Dec 2012		
Deadpool	vol. 3	#900	Dec 2009		
Deadpool	vol. 3	#1000	Oct 2010		
Deadpool	vol. 3	Annual #1	2011		
Deadpool	vol. 4	#1–45	Jan 2013 – Jun 2015		
Deadpool	vol. 4	Annual #1–2	Jan 2014 – Jul 2014		
Deadpool	vol. 4	Bi-Annual #1	Nov 2014		
Deadpool	vol. 5	#1–36; 3.1	Jan 2016 – Nov 2017		
Deadpool	vol. 5	Annual #1	Nov 2016		
Deadpool	vol. 6	#1–15	Aug 2018 – Sep 2019		
Deadpool	vol. 6	Annual #1	Oct 2019		
Deadpool	vol. 7	#1–10	Jan 2020 – Mar 2021		
Deadpool	vol. 8	#1–10	Jan 2023 – Oct 2023		
Deadpool	vol. 9	#1–15	Jun 2024 – Aug 2025		
Deadpool	April Pool's Day	#1	Jun 2026	one-shot	
Deadpool	Assassin	#1–6	Aug 2018 – Oct 2018	limited series	
Deadpool	Back in Black	#1–5	Dec 2016 – Feb 2017	limited series	
Deadpool	Bad Blood	#1–4 (limited series)	2017 (graphic novel); Jun 2022 – Oct 2022 (limited series)	graphic novel; reprinted as 4-issue limited series	
Deadpool	Badder Blood	#1–5	Aug 2023 – Dec 2023	limited series	
Deadpool	Black, White & Blood	#1–4	Oct 2021 – Jan 2022	limited series	
Deadpool	Dracula's Gauntlet	#1–7	Sep 2014 – Oct 2014	limited series	
Deadpool	Family	#1	Jun 2011	one-shot	
Deadpool	Game$ of Death	#1	May 2009	one-shot	
Deadpool	Killustrated	#1–4	Mar 2013 – Jun 2013	limited series	
Deadpool	Last Days of Magic	#1	Jul 2016	one-shot	
Deadpool	Masacre	#1	Jul 2016	one-shot	
Deadpool	Merc with a Mouth	#1–13	Sep 2009 – Sep 2010		
Deadpool	Nerdy 30	#1	May 2021	one-shot	
Deadpool	Pulp	#1–4	Nov 2010 – Feb 2011	limited series	
Deadpool	Seven Slaughters	#1	Jan 2024	one-shot	
Deadpool	Suicide Kings	#1–5	Jun 2009 – Oct 2009	limited series	
Deadpool	The Circle Chase	#1–4	Aug 1993 – Nov 1993	limited series	
Deadpool	The End	#1	Mar 2020	one-shot	
Deadpool	The Gauntlet	#1	Mar 2014	one-shot	
Deadpool	Too Soon	#1–4	Dec 2016 – Mar 2017	limited series	
Deadpool	Wade Wilson's War	#1–4	Aug 2010 – Nov 2010	limited series	
Deadpool & Cable		#26	Apr 2011	continued from Cable vol. 2	
Deadpool & Cable	Split Second	#1–3	Feb 2016 – Apr 2016	limited series	
Deadpool & the Mercs for Money	vol. 1	#1–5	Apr 2016 – Aug 2016	limited series	
Deadpool & the Mercs for Money	vol. 2	#1–10	Sep 2016 – Jun 2017	limited series	
Deadpool & Wolverine: WWIII		#1–3	Jul 2024 – Sep 2024	limited series	
Deadpool Corps		#1–12	Jun 2010 – May 2011		
Deadpool Corps	Rank and Foul	#1	May 2010	one-shot	
Deadpool/GLI - Summer Fun Spectacular		#1	Sep 2007	one-shot	
Deadpool Kills Deadpool		#1–4	Sep 2013 – Dec 2013	limited series	
Deadpool Kills the Marvel Universe		#1–4	Oct 2012	limited series	
Deadpool Kills the Marvel Universe Again		#1–5	Sep 2017 – Nov 2017	limited series	
Deadpool Kills the Marvel Universe One Last Time		#1–5	Jun 2025 – Oct 2025	limited series	
Deadpool Max		#1–12	Dec 2010 – Nov 2011		
Deadpool Max	2	#1–6	Dec 2011 – May 2012	limited series	
Deadpool Max	A History of Violence	#1	May 2011	one-shot	
Deadpool Max	X-Mas Special	#1	Feb 2012	one-shot	
Deadpool Team-Up	vol. 1	#1	Dec 1998	one-shot	
Deadpool Team-Up	vol. 2	#899–883	Jan 2010 – May 2011	series counts down numerically from 899	
Deadpool Team-Up	vol. 3	#1–5	Oct 2024 – Apr 2025	limited series	
Deadpool the Duck		#1–5	Mar 2017 – May 2017	limited series	
Deadpool V Gambit		#1–5	Aug 2016 – Nov 2016	limited series; also known as Deadpool vs. Gambit	
Deadpool vs.	Carnage	#1–4	Jun 2014 – Aug 2014	limited series	
Deadpool vs.	Old Man Logan	#1–5	Dec 2017 – Apr 2018	limited series	
Deadpool vs.	Thanos	#1–4	Nov 2015 – Dec 2015	limited series	
Deadpool vs.	The Punisher	#1–5	Jul 2017 – Aug 2017	limited series	
Deadpool vs.	Wolverine: Slash 'Em Up	#1	May 2025	one-shot	
Deadpool vs.	X-Force	#1–4	Sep 2014 – Nov 2014	limited series	
Deadpool/Wolverine		#1–10	Mar 2025 – Dec 2025		
Deadpool/Wolverine	Weapon X-Traction	#1	Feb 2025	one-shot	
Deadpool's Art of War		#1–4	Dec 2014 – Mar 2015	limited series	
Deadpool's Secret Secret Wars		#1–4	Jul 2015 – Oct 2015	limited series; Secret Wars (2015) tie-in	
Death 3		#1–4	Sep 1993 – Dec 1993	limited series	
Death Metal		#1–4	Jan 1994 – Apr 1994	limited series	
Death Metal vs. Genetix		#1–2	Dec 1993 – Jan 1994	limited series	
The Death of Captain Marvel			Feb 1994	one-shot	
Death of Doctor Strange		#1–5	Nov 2021 – Mar 2022	limited series	
Death of Doctor Strange	Avengers	#1	Jan 2022	one-shot	
Death of Doctor Strange	Blade	#1	Feb 2022	one-shot	
Death of Doctor Strange	Bloodstone	#1	Mar 2022	one-shot	
Death of Doctor Strange	Spider-Man	#1	Feb 2022	one-shot	
Death of Doctor Strange	White Fox	#1	Feb 2022	one-shot	
Death of Doctor Strange	X-Men/Black Knight	#1	Mar 2022	one-shot	
The Death of Dracula		#1	Aug 2010	one-shot	
Death of the Inhumans		#1–5	Sep 2018 – Jan 2019	limited series	
Death of the Silver Surfer		#1–5	Aug 2025 – Dec 2025	limited series	
Death of the Venomverse		#1–5	Oct 2023 – Nov 2023	limited series	
Death of Wolverine		#1–4	Nov 2014 – Dec 2014	limited series	
Death of Wolverine	Deadpool & Captain America	#1	Dec 2014	one-shot	
Death of Wolverine	Life After Logan	#1	Jan 2015	one-shot	
Death of Wolverine	The Logan Legacy	#1–7	Dec 2014 – Feb 2015	limited series	
Death of Wolverine	The Weapon X Program	#1–5	Jan 2015 – Mar 2015	limited series	
Death of X		#1–4	Dec 2016 – Jan 2017	limited series	
Death Wreck		#1–4	Jan 1994 – Apr 1994	limited series	
Death's Head		#1–4	Sep 2019 – Dec 2019	limited series	
Death's Head II	vol. 1	#1–4	Mar 1992 – May 1992	limited series	
Death's Head II	vol. 2	#1–16	Oct 1992 – Mar 1994		
Death's Head II	Gold	#1	Jan 1994	one-shot	
Death's Head II & The Origin of Die-Cut		#1–2	Aug 1993 – Sep 1993	limited series	
Deathblow/Wolverine		#1–2	Sep 1996 – Feb 1997	limited series; co-published with Image Comics	
Deathlok	vol. 1	#1–4	Jul 1990 – Oct 1990	limited series	
Deathlok	vol. 2	#1–34	Jul 1991 – Apr 1994		
Deathlok	vol. 2	Annual #1–2	1992 – 1993		
Deathlok	vol. 3	#1–11	Sep 1999 – Jun 2000		
Deathlok	vol. 4	#1–7	Jan 2010 – Jul 2010	limited series	
Deathlok	vol. 5	#1–10	Dec 2014 – 2015		
Deathlok	50th Anniversary Special	#1	Nov 2024	one-shot	
Deathlok	Special	#1–4	May 1991 – Jun 1991	limited series; reprint of Deathlok vol. 1	
Decimation: House of M - The Day After		#1	Jan 2006	one-shot	
The Deep		#1	1977	one-shot; adaptation of 1977 film	
Defenders	vol. 1	#1–152	Aug 1972 – Feb 1986	titled as The Defenders for issues #1-139 and as The New Defenders for issues #140-152	
Defenders	vol. 1	Annual #1	1976		
Defenders	vol. 1	Giant-Size #1–5	Jul 1974 – Jul 1975		
Defenders	vol. 2	#1–12	Mar 2001 – Feb 2002	continued as The Order vol. 1	
Defenders	vol. 3	#1–5	Sep 2005 – Jan 2006	limited series	
Defenders	vol. 4	#1–12	Feb 2012 – Jan 2013		
Defenders	vol. 5	#1–10	Apr 2017 – Apr 2018		
Defenders	vol. 6	#1–5	Oct 2021 – Mar 2022	limited series	
Defenders	Beyond	#1–5	Sep 2022 – Jan 2023	limited series	
Defenders	Strange Heroes	#1	Feb 2012	one-shot	
Defenders of Dynatron City		#1–6	Feb 1992 – Jul 1992	based on the video game	
Demon Days	Blood Feud	#1	May 2022	one-shot; part 5 of 5	
Demon Days	Cursed Web	#1	Nov 2021	one-shot; part 3 of 5	
Demon Days	Mariko	#1	Aug 2021	one-shot; part 2 of 5	
Demon Days	Rising Storm	#1	Feb 2022	one-shot; part 4 of 5	
Demon Days	X-Men	#1	May 2021	one-shot; part 1 of 5	
Demon Wars	Down in Flames	#1	Apr 2023	one-shot; part 3 of 4	
Demon Wars	Scarlet Sin	#1	Jul 2023	one-shot; part 4 of 4	
Demon Wars	Shield of Justice	#1	Jan 2023	one-shot; part 2 of 4	
Demon Wars	The Iron Samurai	#1	Oct 2022	one-shot; part 1 of 4	
Dennis the Menace		#1–13	Nov 1981 – Nov 1982		
Despicable Deadpool		#287–300	Dec 2017 – Jul 2018		
The Destroyer	vol. 1	#1–9	Nov 1989 – Jun 1990		
The Destroyer	vol. 2	#1	Mar 1991	one-shot	
The Destroyer	vol. 3	#1–4	Dec 1991 – Mar 1992	limited series	
Destroyer		#1–5	Jun 2009 – Oct 2009	limited series	
Devil Dinosaur		#1–9	Apr 1978 – Dec 1978		
Devil Dinosaur	Spring Fling	#1	Jun 1997	one-shot	
Devil's Reign		#1–6	Feb 2022 – Jun 2022	limited series	
Devil's Reign	Moon Knight	#1	May 2022	one-shot	
Devil's Reign	Omega	#1	Jul 2022	one-shot	
Devil's Reign	Spider-Man	#1	May 2022	one-shot	
Devil's Reign	Superior Four	#1–3	Mar 2022 – May 2022	limited series	
Devil's Reign	Villains for Hire	#1–3	Mar 2022 – May 2022	limited series	
Devil's Reign	Winter Soldier	#1	Mar 2022	one-shot	
Devil's Reign	X-Men	#1–3	Mar 2022 – May 2022	limited series	
Devil's Reign 1/2: Silver Surfer/Witchblade		#1/2	Mar 1997	one-shot; co-published with Top Cow Productions and Wizard	
Dexter		#1–5	Sep 2013 – Jan 2014	limited series	
Dexter Down Under		#1–5	Apr 2014 – Aug 2014	limited series	
Die-Cut		#1–4	Nov 1993 – Feb 1994	limited series	
Die-Cut vs. G-Force		#1–2	Nov 1993 – Dec 1993	limited series	
Digitek		#1–4	Dec 1992 – Mar 1993	limited series	
Dino-Riders		#1–3	Feb 1989 – May 1989	limited series	
Dinosaurs, A Celebration		#1–4	Oct 1992	limited series	
The Disney Afternoon		#1–10	Nov 1994 – Aug 1995		
Disney Comic Hits		#1–16	Oct 1995 – Jan 1997		
Disney Kingdoms	Figment	#1–5	Aug 2014 – Dec 2014	limited series	
Disney Kingdoms	Figment 2	#1–5	Nov 2015 – Mar 2016	limited series	
Disney Kingdoms	Seekers of the Weird	#1–5	Mar 2014 – Jul 2014	limited series	
Disney's Aladdin		#1–11	Oct 1994 – Aug 1995		
Disney's Beauty and the Beast		#1–13	Sep 1994 – Sep 1995		
Disney's Pocahontas		#1	Jul 1995	one-shot; adaptation of the 1995 film	
Disney's The Hunchback of Notre Dame		#1	Jul 1996	one-shot; adaptation of the 1996 film	
Disney's The Lion King		#1–2	Jul 1994 – Aug 1994	limited series; adaptation of the 1994 film	
Disney's The Little Mermaid		#1–12	Sep 1994 – Aug 1995		
Disney's The Three Musketeers		#1–2	Jan 1994 – Feb 1994	limited series; adaptation of the 1993 film	
Disney's Toy Story		#1–2	1995	limited series; adaptation of the 1995 film	
District X		#1–14	Jul 2004 – Aug 2005		
DNX		#1–5	Nov 2026 – Jan 2027	limited series	
Doc Samson	vol. 1	#1–4	Jan 1996 – Apr 1996	limited series	
Doc Samson	vol. 2	#1–5	Mar 2006 – Jul 2006	limited series	
Doc Savage		#1–8	Oct 1972 – Jan 1974		
Doc Savage		Giant-Size #1	1975		
Doctor Doom		#1–10	Dec 2019 – Feb 2021		
Doctor Doom & Rocket Raccoon		#1	Mar 2025	one-shot	
Doctor Doom and the Masters of Evil		#1–4	Mar 2009 – Jun 2009	limited series	
Doctor Octopus: Negative Exposure		#1–5	Dec 2003 – Apr 2004	limited series; also known as Spider-Man/Doctor Octopus: Negative Exposure	
Doctor Spectrum		#1–6	Oct 2004 – Mar 2005	limited series	
Doctor Strange	vol. 1	#169–183	Jun 1968 – Nov 1969	continued from Strange Tales vol. 1	
Doctor Strange	vol. 2	#1–81	Jun 1974 – Feb 1987		
Doctor Strange	vol. 2	Annual #1	1976		
Doctor Strange	vol. 2	Giant-Size #1	1975		
Doctor Strange	vol. 3	#1–4	Feb 1999 – May 1999	limited series	
Doctor Strange	vol. 4	#1–26 1.MU	Dec 2015 – Dec 2017		
Doctor Strange	vol. 4	Annual #1	Nov 2016		
Doctor Strange	vol. 5	#381–390	Jan 2018 – Jul 2018	numbering continued from Strange Tales vol. 1	
Doctor Strange	vol. 6	#1–20	Aug 2018 – Dec 2019		
Doctor Strange	vol. 6	Annual #1	2019		
Doctor Strange	vol. 7	#1–18	May 2023 – Oct 2024		
Doctor Strange	vol. 8	#450	Nov 2025	one-shot	
Doctor Strange	vol. 9	#1–10	Feb 2026 – Nov 2026		
Doctor Strange	Classics	#1–4	Mar 1984 – Jun 1984		
Doctor Strange	Damnation	#1–4	Apr 2018 – Jun 2018	limited series	
Doctor Strange	Fall Sunrise	#1–4	Jan 2023 – Apr 2023	limited series	
Doctor Strange	Last Days of Magic	#1	Jun 2016	one-shot	
Doctor Strange	Mystic Apprentice	#1	Dec 2016	one-shot	
Doctor Strange	Nexus of Nightmares	#1	Jun 2022	one-shot	
Doctor Strange	Special Edition	#1	Mar 1983	one-shot; also known as Doctor Strange/Silver Dagger	
Doctor Strange	The End	#1	Mar 2020	one-shot	
Doctor Strange	The Oath	#1–5	Dec 2006 – Apr 2007	limited series	
Doctor Strange	What Is It That Disturbs You, Stephen?	#1	Oct 1997	one-shot	
Doctor Strange and Doctor Doom: Triumph and Torment		#1	Nov 2026	one-shot; reprinting of Marvel Graphic Novel: Doctor Strange and Doctor Doom – Triumph and Torment (1989)	
Doctor Strange and the Sorcerers Supreme		#1–12	Dec 2016 – Nov 2017		
Doctor Strange/Ghost Rider Special		#1	Apr 1991	one-shot	
Doctor Strange of Asgard		#1–5	May 2025 – Sep 2025	limited series; One World Under Doom tie-in	
Doctor Strange/The Punisher: Magic Bullets		#1–4	Feb 2017 – May 2017	limited series	
Doctor Strange, Sorcerer Supreme		#1–90	Nov 1988 – Jun 1996		
Doctor Strange, Sorcerer Supreme		Annual #2–4	1992 – 1994		
Doctor Voodoo: Avenger of the Supernatural		#1–5	Dec 2009 – Apr 2010		
Doctor Voodoo: The Origin of Jericho Drumm		#1	Feb 2010	one-shot	
Doctor Who		#1–23	Oct 1984 – Aug 1986		
Domination Factor	Avengers	#1–4	Nov 1999 – Feb 2000	limited series	
Domination Factor	Fantastic Four	#1–4	Dec 1999 - Feb 2000	limited series	
Dominic Fortune		#1–4	Oct 2009 – Jan 2010	limited series	
Domino	vol. 1	#1–3	Jan 1997 – Mar 1997	limited series	
Domino	vol. 2	#1–4	Jun 2003 – Aug 2003	limited series	
Domino	vol. 3	#1–10	Jun 2018 – Mar 2019		
Domino	vol. 3	Annual #1	Nov 2018		
Domino	Hotshots	#1–5	May 2019 – Sep 2019	limited series	
Doom	vol. 1	#1–3	Oct 2000 – Dec 2000	limited series	
Doom	vol. 2	#1	Jul 2024	one-shot	
Doom	All-On-One	#1	Dec 2026	one-shot	
Doom	The Emperor Returns	#1–3	Jan 2002 – Mar 2002	limited series	
Doom 2099	vol. 1	#1–44	Jan 1993 – Aug 1996		
Doom 2099	vol. 2	#1	Feb 2020	one-shot	
Doom 2099	Rage of Doom	#1	Jun 2026	one-shot	
Doom Academy		#1–5	Apr 2025 – Aug 2025	limited series; One World Under Doom tie-in	
Doom's Division		#1–5	May 2025 – Sep 2025	limited series; One World Under Doom tie-in	
Doomed 2099		#1	Oct 2025	one-shot; One World Under Doom tie-in	
Doomquest		#1–10	Jul 2026 – present	limited series	
Doomwar		#1–6	Apr 2010 – Sep 2010	limited series	
Dorothy & the Wizard in Oz		#1–8	Nov 2011 – Aug 2012	limited series	
Double Dragon		#1–6	Jul 1991 – Dec 1991	limited series; based on the video game	
Double Edge		Alpha	Aug 1995	one-shot	
Double Edge		Omega	Oct 1995	one-shot	
Dr. Strange		#1–6	Feb 2020 – Oct 2020		
Dr. Strange vs. Dracula		#1	Mar 1994	one-shot	
Dracula		#1–4	Jul 2010 – Sep 2010	limited series	
Dracula		Giant-Size #1–5	Jun 1974 – Jun 1975	#1 labeled as Chillers Featuring Curse of Dracula	
Dracula	Blood Hunt	#1–3	Jul 2024 – Sep 2024	limited series	
Dracula	Lord of the Undead	#1–3	Dec 1998	limited series	
The Draft		#1	Jul 1988	one-shot	
Dragon Strike		#1	Feb 1994	one-shot	
Dragon's Claws		#1–10	Jun 1988 – Apr 1989		
Dragonslayer		#1–2	Oct 1981 – Nov 1981	limited series; adaptation of the 1981 film	
Drax		#1–11	Jan 2016 – Nov 2016		
Drax the Destroyer		#1–4	Nov 2005 – Feb 2006	limited series	
Dream Team		#1	Jul 1995	one-shot; co-published with Malibu Comics	
Druid		#1–4	May 1995 – Aug 1995	limited series	
Dune		#1–3	Apr 1985 – Jun 1985	limited series; adaptation of the 1984 film	
Dungeons of Doom		#1–3	Mar 2026 – May 2026	limited series	
Dynomutt		#1–6	Nov 1977 – Sep 1978		

== E ==
Title	Series	Issues	Dates	Notes	Reference
E is for Extinction		#1–4	Aug 2015	limited series; Secret Wars (2015) tie-in	
Earth X		#0–12; X	Mar 1999 – Jun 2000	limited series	
Earthworm Jim		#1–3	Dec 1995 – Feb 1996	limited series; based on the video game	
Echo: Seeker of Truth		#1	Jan 2026	one-shot	
Ectokid		#1–9	Sep 1993 – May 1994		
Ectokid Unleashed		#1	Oct 1994	one-shot	
Eddie Brock: Carnage		#1–10	Apr 2025 – Jan 2026		
Eden's Trail		#1–5	Jan 2003 – May 2003	limited series	
Edge of Spider-Geddon		#1–4	Oct 2018 – Nov 2018	limited series	
Edge of Spider-Verse	vol. 1	#1–5	Nov 2014 – Jan 2015	limited series	
Edge of Spider-Verse	vol. 2	#1–5	Oct 2022 – Dec 2022	limited series	
Edge of Spider-Verse	vol. 3	#1–4	Jul 2023 – Sep 2023	limited series	
Edge of Spider-Verse	vol. 4	#1–4	Apr 2024 – Jul 2024	limited series	
Edge of Venomverse	vol. 1	#1–5	Aug 2017 – Oct 2017	limited series	
Edge of Venomverse	vol. 2	#1	Nov 2025	one-shot	
Electric Ant		#1–5	Jun 2010 – Oct 2010	limited series	
Elektra	vol. 1	#1–19 -1	Nov 1996 – Jun 1998		
Elektra	vol. 2	#1–35	Sep 2001 – Jun 2004		
Elektra	vol. 3	#1–11	Jun 2014 – May 2015		
Elektra	vol. 4	#1–5	Apr 2017 – Aug 2017	limited series	
Elektra	vol. 5	#100	Jun 2022	one-shot	
Elektra	Assassin	#1–8	Aug 1986 – Mar 1987	limited series	
Elektra	Battlebook: Streets of Fire	#1	Nov 1998	one-shot	
Elektra	Black, White & Blood	#1–4	Mar 2022 – Jul 2022	limited series	
Elektra	Glimpse and Echo	#1–4	Sep 2002 – Dec 2002	limited series	
Elektra	Root of Evil	#1–4	Mar 1995 – Jun 1995	limited series	
Elektra	The Hand	#1–5	Nov 2004 – Feb 2005	limited series	
Elektra	The Movie	#1	Feb 2005	one-shot; adaptation of the 2005 film	
Elektra and Wolverine: The Redeemer		#1–3	Jan 2002 – Mar 2002	limited series	
Elektra/Cyblade		#1	Mar 1997	one-shot; co-published with Top Cow Productions and Image Comics	
Elektra Lives Again			1990	graphic novel; published under the Epic Comics imprint	
Elektra Megazine		#1–2	Nov 1996 – Dec 1996	limited series	
The Elektra Saga		#1–4	Feb 1984 – May 1984	limited series	
The Emerald City of Oz		#1–5	Sep 2013 – Feb 2014	limited series	
Emma		#1–5	May 2011 – Sep 2011	limited series; adaptation of the novel	
Emma Frost		#1–18	Aug 2003 – Feb 2005		
Emma Frost	The White Queen	#1–5	Aug 2025 – Dec 2025	limited series	
Emperor Doom		#1	Jan 2027	one-shot; reprinting of Marvel Graphic Novel: Emperor Doom (1987)	
Empyre		#1–6	Sep 2020 – Nov 2020	limited series	
Empyre	Aftermath Avengers	#1	Nov 2020	one-shot	
Empyre	Avengers	#0–3	Aug 2020 – Oct 2020	limited series	
Empyre	Captain America	#1–3	Sep 2020 – Oct 2020	limited series	
Empyre	Fallout Fantastic Four	#1	Nov 2020	one-shot	
Empyre	Fantastic Four	#0	Sep 2020	one-shot	
Empyre	Handbook	#1	Oct 2020	one-shot	
Empyre	Savage Avengers	#1	Sep 2020	one-shot	
Empyre	X-Men	#1–4	Sep 2020 – Oct 2020	limited series	
Enchanted Tiki Room		#1–5	Dec 2016 – Apr 2017	limited series	
Encyclopaedia Deadpoolica		#1	Dec 1998	one-shot	
The End 2099		#1–5	Feb 2026 – Jun 2026	limited series	
Ender's Game	Battle School	#1–5	Dec 2008 – Jun 2009	limited series	
Ender's Game	Command School	#1–5	Nov 2009 – Apr 2010	limited series	
Ender's Game	Mazer in Prison Special	#1	Apr 2010	one-shot	
Ender's Game	The League War	#1	Jun 2010	one-shot	
Ender's Game	Recruiting Valentine	#1	Aug 2009	one-shot	
Ender's Game	War of Gifts Special	#1	Feb 2010	one-shot	
Ender's Shadow	Battle School	#1–5	Feb 2009 – Jun 2009	limited series	
Ender's Shadow	Command School	#1–5	Nov 2009 – Apr 2010	limited series	
Enter the Heroic Age		#1	Jul 2010	one-shot	
The Eternal		#1–6	Aug 2003 – Jan 2004	limited series	
Eternals	vol. 1	#1–19	Jul 1976 – Jan 1978	titled The Eternals	
Eternals	vol. 1	Annual #1	1977	titled The Eternals	
Eternals	vol. 2	#1–12	Oct 1985 – Sep 1986	limited series	
Eternals	vol. 3	#1–7	Aug 2006 – Mar 2007	limited series	
Eternals	vol. 4	#1–9	Aug 2008 – May 2009		
Eternals	vol. 4	Annual #1	2009		
Eternals	vol. 5	#1–12	Mar 2021 – Jul 2022		
Eternals	50th Anniversary Special	#1	Jun 2026	one-shot	
Eternals	Celestia	#1	Dec 2021	one-shot	
Eternals	Forever	#1	Dec 2021	one-shot	
Eternals	Secrets From The Marvel Universe	#1	Feb 2020	one-shot	
Eternals	Thanos Rises	#1	Nov 2021	one-shot	
Eternals	The Heretic	#1	May 2022	one-shot	
Eternals	The Herod Factor	#1	Nov 1991	one-shot	
Evel Knievel		#1	1974	one-shot; in arrangement with Ideal Toy Company	
Excalibur	vol. 1	#1–125 -1	Oct 1988 – Oct 1998		
Excalibur	vol. 1	Annual #1–2	1993 – 1994		
Excalibur	vol. 2	#1–4	Feb 2001 – May 2001	limited series	
Excalibur	vol. 3	#1–14	Jul 2004 – Jul 2005		
Excalibur	vol. 4	#1–26	Dec 2019 – Feb 2022		
Excalibur	Air Apparent	#1	Dec 1991	one-shot	
Excalibur	Mojo Mayhem	#1	Dec 1989	one-shot	
Excalibur	Special Edition		1987	one-shot; also known as Excalibur: The Sword is Drawn	
Excalibur	The Possession	#1	Jul 1991	one-shot	
Excalibur	XX Crossing	#1	May 1992	one-shot	
Exceptional X-Men		#1–13	Nov 2024 – Nov 2025		
Exciting X-Patrol		#1	Jun 1997	One-shot; published under the Amalgam Comics imprint in association with DC	
Exiled		#1	Jul 2012	one-shot	
Exiles	vol. 1	#1–100	Aug 2001 – Feb 2008		
Exiles	vol. 1	Annual #1	Feb 2007		
Exiles	vol. 2	#1–6	Jun 2009 – Nov 2009		
Exiles	vol. 3	#1–12	Jun 2018 – Mar 2019		
Exiles	Days of Then and Now	#1	Mar 2008	one-shot	
Expatriate X-Men		#1–3	Dec 2025 – Feb 2026	limited series; Age of Revelation tie-in	
Extermination		#1–5	Oct 2018 – Feb 2019	limited series	
Extraordinary X-Men		#1–20	Jan 2016 – May 2017		
Extraordinary X-Men		Annual #1	Nov 2016		
Extreme Carnage	Agony	#1	Nov 2021	one-shot; part 7 of 8	
Extreme Carnage	Alpha	#1	Sep 2021	one-shot; part 1 of 8	
Extreme Carnage	Lasher	#1	Oct 2021	one-shot; part 4 of 8	
Extreme Carnage	Omega	#1	Nov 2021	one-shot; part 8 of 8	
Extreme Carnage	Phage	#1	Sep 2021	one-shot; part 3 of 8	
Extreme Carnage	Riot	#1	Oct 2021	one-shot; part 5 of 8	
Extreme Carnage	Scream	#1	Sep 2021	one-shot; part 2 of 8	
Extreme Carnage	Toxin	#1	Nov 2021	one-shot; part 6 of 8	
Extreme Venomverse		#1–5	Jul 2023 – Sep 2023	limited series	
