= List of Marvel Comics publications (T–V) =

Marvel Comics is an American comic book company dating to 1961. This is a list of the publications it has released in its history under the "Marvel Comics" imprint. The list does not include collected editions; trade paperbacks; digital comics; free, promotional giveaways; sketchbooks; poster books or magazines, nor does it include series published by other Marvel imprints such as Epic, Icon or Star. It also does not include titles published by Marvel's pre-1961 predecessors Timely Comics and Atlas Comics.

- List of Marvel Comics publications (A)
- List of Marvel Comics publications (B–C)
- List of Marvel Comics publications (D–E)
- List of Marvel Comics publications (F–G)
- List of Marvel Comics publications (H–L)
- List of Marvel Comics publications (M)
- List of Marvel Comics publications (N–R)
- List of Marvel Comics publications (S)
- List of Marvel Comics publications (W–Z)

== T ==
Title	Series	Issues	Dates	Notes	Reference
Tails of the Pet Avengers		#1	Apr 2010	one-shot	
Tails of the Pet Avengers	The Dogs of Summer	#1	Sep 2010	one-shot	
Tales from the Age of Apocalypse		#1	Dec 1996	one-shot	
Tales from the Age of Apocalypse	Sinister Bloodlines		Dec 1997	one-shot	
Tales of Asgard	vol. 1	#1	Oct 1968	one-shot	
Tales of Asgard	vol. 2	#1	Feb 1984	one-shot	
Tales of G. I. Joe		#1–15	Jan 1988 – Mar 1989		
Tales of Suspense	vol. 1	#19–99	Jul 1961 – Mar 1968	previous issues published by Atlas Comics; continued as Captain America vol. 2	
Tales of Suspense	vol. 2	#1	Jan 1995	one-shot	
Tales of Suspense	vol. 3	#100–104	Feb 2018 – Jun 2018	limited series; numbering continued from vol. 1	
Tales of the Dragon Guard		#1–3	Apr 2010 – Jun 2010	limited series	
Tales of the Dragon Guard	Into the Veil	#1–3	Nov 2010 – Jan 2011	limited series	
Tales of the Marvel Universe		#1	Feb 1997	one-shot	
Tales of the Marvels	Blockbuster	#1	Apr 1995	one-shot	
Tales of the Marvels	Inner Demons	#1	Jan 1996	one-shot	
Tales of the Marvels	Wonder Years	#1–2	Aug 1995 – Sep 1995	limited series	
Tales of the Thing		#1–3	May 2005 – Jul 2005	limited series	
Tales to Astonish	vol. 1	#21–101	Jul 1961 – Mar 1968	previous issues published by Atlas Comics; continued as The Incredible Hulk vol. 2	
Tales to Astonish	vol. 2	#1–14	Dec 1979 – Jan 1981		
Tales to Astonish	vol. 3	#1	Dec 1994	one-shot	
Tangled Web: The Thousand		#1–4	Jun 2001 – Sep 2001	continued as Spider-Man's Tangled Web	
Tarot		#1–4	Mar 2020 – May 2020	limited series	
Tarzan		#1–29	June 1977 – Oct 1979		
Tarzan		Annual #1–3	1977 – 1979		
Tarzan of the Apes		#1–2	Jul 1984 – Aug 1984	limited series	
Taskmaster	vol. 1	#1–4	Apr 2002 – Jul 2002	limited series	
Taskmaster	vol. 2	#1–4	Nov 2010 – Feb 2011	limited series	
Taskmaster	vol. 3	#1–5	Jan 2021 – May 2021	limited series	
Team America		#1–12	Jun 1982 – May 1983		
Team X 2000		#1	Feb 1999	one-shot	
Team X/Team 7			Nov 1996	one-shot; co-published with WildStorm/Image Comics	
Teen-Age Romance		#82–86	Jun 1961 – Mar 1962	previous issues published by Atlas Comics	
Terminator 2: Judgment Day		#1–3	Sep 1991 – Oct 1991	limited series; movie adaptation	
Terror Inc.	vol. 1	#1–13	Jul 1992 – Jul 1993		
Terror Inc.	vol. 2	#1–5	Oct 2007 – Apr 2008	limited series	
Terror Inc.	Apocalypse Soon	#1–4	May 2009 – Sep 2009	limited series	
Tex Dawson, Gun-slinger		#1	Jan 1973	continued as Gun-slinger	
Thanos	vol. 1	#1–12	Dec 2003 – Sep 2004		
Thanos	vol. 2	Annual #1	Jul 2014	one-shot	
Thanos	vol. 3	#1–18	Jan 2017 – Jun 2018		
Thanos	vol. 3	Annual #1	2018		
Thanos	vol. 4	#1–6	Jun 2019 – Nov 2019	limited series	
Thanos	vol. 5	#1–4	Jan 2024 – May 2024	limited series	
Thanos	vol. 6	Annual #1	Aug 2024	one-shot	
Thanos	A God Up There Listening	#1–4	Dec 2014	limited series	
Thanos	Death Notes	#1	Feb 2023	one-shot	
Thanos	Legacy	#1	Nov 2018	one-shot	
Thanos	Rising	#1–5	Jun 2013 – Oct 2013	limited series	
Thanos	Sourcebook		Aug 2010	one-shot	
Thanos	The Final Threat	#1	Nov 2012	one-shot	
Thanos	The Infinity Conflict		2018	graphic novel	
Thanos	The Infinity Ending		2019	graphic novel	
Thanos	The Infinity Finale		2016	graphic novel	
Thanos	The Infinity Relativity		2015	graphic novel	
Thanos	The Infinity Revelation		2014	graphic novel	
Thanos	The Infinity Siblings		2018	graphic novel	
The Thanos Imperative		#1–6	Aug 2010 – Jan 2011	limited series	
The Thanos Imperative	Devastation	#1	Mar 2011	one-shot	
The Thanos Imperative	Ignition	#1	Jul 2010	one-shot	
The Thanos Quest		#1–2	Sep 1990 – Oct 1990	limited series	
Thanos vs. Hulk		#1–4	Feb 2015 – May 2015	limited series	
The Thing	vol. 1	#1–36	Jul 1983 – Jun 1986		
The Thing	vol. 2	#1–8	Jan 2006 – Sep 2006		
The Thing	vol. 3	#1–6	Jan 2022 – Jun 2022	limited series	
The Thing	vol. 4	#1–5	Jul 2025 – Nov 2025	limited series	
The Thing	Freakshow	#1–4	Aug 2002 – Nov 2002	limited series	
Thing & She-Hulk: The Long Night		#1	May 2002	one-shot	
Thor	vol. 1	#126–502	Mar 1966 – Sep 1996	continued from Journey into Mystery vol. 1; continued as Journey into Mystery vol. 3	
Thor	vol. 1	Annual #2–19	1966 – 1994	continued from Journey into Mystery vol. 1; continued as Journey into Mystery vol. 3	
Thor	vol. 1	Giant-Size #1	1975		
Thor	vol. 2	#1–85	Jul 1998 – Dec 2004	Issues #36–85 are dual numbered as #538–587	
Thor	vol. 2	1999, 2000, 2001	1999 – 2001	Annuals	
Thor	vol. 3	#1–12; 600–621; 620.1	Sep 2007 – May 2011	renumbered after #12 to #600; continued as Journey into Mystery vol. 4	
Thor	vol. 3	Annual #1	2009		
Thor	vol. 3	Giant-Size Finale #1	Jan 2010		
Thor	vol. 4	#1–8	Dec 2014 – Jul 2015		
Thor	vol. 4	Annual #1	2015		
Thor	vol. 5	#1–16	Aug 2018 – Oct 2019		
Thor	vol. 6	#1–35	Mar 2020 – Aug 2023		
Thor	vol. 6	Annual #1	2021		
Thor	vol. 7	Annual #1	2023	one-shot	
Thor	vol. 8	#1–13	Oct 2025 – Sep 2026	also known as The Mortal Thor	
Thor	vol. 9	#800–	Oct 2026 – present	issue #800 dual-numbered as #14 of previous volume	
Thor	Ages of Thunder	#1	Jun 2008	one-shot	
Thor	Asgard's Avenger	#1	Jun 2011	one-shot	
Thor	Battlebook: Streets of Fire		1998	one-shot	
Thor	Blood Oath	#1–6	Nov 2005 – Feb 2006	limited series	
Thor	Crown of Fools	#1	Dec 2013	one-shot	
Thor	First Thunder	#1–5	Nov 2010 – Mar 2011	limited series	
Thor	For Asgard	#1–6	Nov 2010 – Apr 2011	limited series	
Thor	God of Thunder	#1–25	Jan 2013 – Nov 2014		
Thor	God-Size Special	#1	Feb 2009	one-shot	
Thor	Godstorm	#1–3	Nov 2001 – Jan 2002	limited series; also known as The Mighty Thor: Godstorm	
Thor	Goes Hollywood	#1	Nov 2011	one-shot	
Thor	Heaven & Earth	#1–4	Sep 2011 – Nov 2011	limited series	
Thor	Lightning and Lament	#1	Aug 2022	one-shot	
Thor	Man of War	#1	Jan 2009	one-shot	
Thor	Reign of Blood	#1	Aug 2008	one-shot	
Thor	Son of Asgard	#1–12	May 2004 – Mar 2005	limited series	
Thor	Spotlight		May 2011	one-shot	
Thor	Tales of Asgard	#1–6	May 2009 – Oct 2009	limited series	
Thor	The Deviants Saga	#1–5	Jan 2012 – May 2012	limited series	
Thor	The Legend	#1	Sep 1996	one-shot	
Thor	The Mighty Avenger	#1–8	Sep 2010 – Mar 2011		
Thor	The Rage of Thor	#1	Oct 2010	one-shot	
Thor	The Trial of Thor	#1	Aug 2009	one-shot	
Thor	The Worthy	#1	Feb 2020	one-shot	
Thor	Truth of History	#1	Dec 2008	one-shot	
Thor	Vikings	#1–5	Sep 2003 – Jan 2004	limited series	
Thor	Where Walk the Frost Giants	#1	Dec 2017	one-shot	
Thor	Whosoever Wields This Hammer	#1	Jun 2011	one-shot	
Thor	Wolves of the North	#1	Feb 2011	one-shot	
Thor & Hercules: Encyclopaedia Mythologica			Aug 2009	one-shot	
Thor & Loki: Double Trouble		#1–4	May 2021 – Sep 2021	limited series	
Thor and the Warriors Four		#1–4	Jun 2010 – Sep 2010	limited series	
Thor Corps		#1–4	Sep 1993 – Dec 1993	limited series	
Thorion of the New Asgods		#1	Jun 1997	One-shot; published under the Amalgam Comics imprint in association with DC	
Thors		#1–4	Aug 2015 – Jan 2016	limited series; Secret Wars (2015) tie-in	
Thunderbolts	vol. 1	#1–81	Apr 1997 – Sep 2003	continued as New Thunderbolts	
Thunderbolts	vol. 1	'97	1997	Annual	
Thunderbolts	vol. 1	2000	2000	Annual	
Thunderbolts	vol. 2	#100–174; 163.1	May 2006 – Jul 2012	continued from New Thunderbolts; continued as Dark Avengers vol. 2	
Thunderbolts	vol. 3	#1–32	Feb 2013 – Dec 2014		
Thunderbolts	vol. 3	Annual #1	Feb 2014		
Thunderbolts	vol. 4	#1–12	Jul 2016 – Jun 2017		
Thunderbolts	vol. 5	#1–5	Oct 2022 – Feb 2023	limited series	
Thunderbolts	vol. 6	#1–4	Feb 2024 – May 2024	limited series	
Thunderbolts	Breaking Point	#1	Jan 2008	one-shot	
Thunderbolts	Desperate Measures	#1	Sep 2007	one-shot	
Thunderbolts	Distant Rumblings	#-1	Jul 1997	one-shot	
Thunderbolts	Doomstrike	#1–5	Apr 2025 – Jul 2025	limited series; One World Under Doom tie-in	
Thunderbolts	International Incident	#1	Apr 2008	one-shot	
Thunderbolts	Life Sentences	#1	Jul 2001	one-shot	
Thunderbolts	Reason in Madness	#1	Jul 2008	one-shot	
Thunderbolts Presents: Zemo – Born Better		#1–4	Apr 2007 – Jul 2007	limited series	
Thunderstrike	vol. 1	#1–24	Jun 1993 – Sep 1995		
Thunderstrike	vol. 2	#1–5	Jan 2011 – Jun 2011	limited series	
Tiger Division		#1–5	Jan 2023 – May 2023	limited series	
Tigra		#1–4	May 2002 – Aug 2002	limited series	
Time Bandits		#1	Feb 1982	one-shot; movie adaptation	
Timeless	vol. 1	#1	Feb 2022	one-shot	
Timeless	vol. 2	#1	Feb 2023	one-shot	
Timeless	vol. 3	#1	Feb 2024	one-shot	
Timeslide		#1	Feb 2025	one-shot	
Timeslip Collection		#1	Nov 1998	one-shot	
Timeslip Special		#1	Oct 1998	one-shot; also known as Timeslip: The Coming of the Avengers	
Timestorm 2009/2099		#1–4	Jun 2009 – Oct 2009	limited series	
Timestorm 2009/2099	Spider-Man	#1	Aug 2009	one-shot	
Timestorm 2009/2099	X-Men	#1	Aug 2009	one-shot	
Tomb of Apocalypse		#1–5	Oct 2026 – present	limited series	
Tomb of Darkness		#9–23	Jul 1974 – Nov 1976	continued from Beware	
Tomb of Dracula	vol. 1	#1–70	Apr 1972 – Aug 1979		
Tomb of Dracula	vol. 3	#1–4	Dec 2004 – Mar 2005	limited series vol. 2 published by the Epic Comics imprint	
Tomb of Dracula Presents: Throne of Blood		#1	Jun 2011	one-shot	
Tomb of Terror		#1	Dec 2010	one-shot	
Tony Stark: Iron Man		#1–19	Aug 2018 – Feb 2020		
The Torch		#1–8	Nov 2009 – Jul 2010	limited series; co-published with Dynamite Entertainment	
Totally Awesome Hulk		#1–23 1.MU	Feb 2016 – Nov 2017		
Tower of Shadows		#1–9	Sep 1969 – Jan 1971	continued as Creatures on the Loose	
Tower of Shadows		Special #1	Dec 1971		
Toxic Avenger		#1–11	Apr 1991 – Feb 1992		
Toxic Crusaders		#1–8	May 1992 – Dec 1992		
Toxin		#1–6	Jun 2005 – Nov 2005	limited series	
The Transformers		#1–80	Sep 1984 –Jul 1991		
The Transformers	Generation 2	#1–12	Nov 1993 – Oct 1994		
The Transformers	Headmasters	#1–4	Jul 1987 – Jan 1988	limited series	
The Transformers	The Movie	#1–3	Dec 1986 – Feb 1987	limited series; adaptation of the 1986 movie	
The Transformers	Universe	#1–4	Dec 1986 – Mar 1987	limited series	
The Trials of Ultraman		#1–5	May 2021 – Oct 2021	limited series	
Trojan War		#1–5	Jul 2009 – Nov 2009	limited series	
Tron	Betrayal	#1–2	Dec 2010 – Jan 2011	limited series; movie tie-in	
Tron	Original Movie Adaptation	#1–2	Jan 2011 – Feb 2011	limited series; movie adaptation	
True Believers		#1–5	Sep 2008 – Jan 2009	limited series	
Truth: Red, White & Black		#1–7	Jan 2003 – Jul 2003	limited series	
TV Stars		#1–4	Aug 1978 – Feb 1979		
TVA		#1–5	Feb 2025 – Jun 2025	limited series	
The Twelve		#0–12	Feb 2008 – Jun 2012	limited series four year gap between issues 8 and 9	
The Twelve	Spearhead	#1	May 2010	one-shot	
Two-Gun Kid	vol. 2	#60–136	Nov 1962 – Apr 1977	vol. 1 published by Timely Comics previous issues in vol. 2 published by Atlas Comics	
Two-Gun Kid	Sunset Riders	#1–2	Nov 1995 – Dec 1995	limited series	
Typhoid		#1–4	Nov 1995 – Feb 1996	limited series	
Typhoid Fever	Iron Fist	#1	Feb 2019	one-shot	
Typhoid Fever	Spider-Man	#1	Dec 2018	one-shot	
Typhoid Fever	X-Men	#1	Jan 2019	one-shot	

== U ==
Title	Series	Issues	Dates	Notes	Reference
Ultimate Adventures		#1–6	Nov 2002 – Sep 2003	limited series	
Ultimate Armor Wars		#1–4	Nov 2009 – Apr 2010	limited series	
Ultimate Avengers		#1–18	Oct 2009 – Mar 2011		
Ultimate Avengers vs. New Ultimates		#1–6	Apr 2011 – Sep 2011	limited series	
Ultimate Black Panther		#1–24	Apr 2024 – Mar 2026		
Ultimate Captain America		#1–4	Mar 2011 – Jun 2011	limited series	
Ultimate Captain America	Annual	#1	Dec 2008	one-shot	
Ultimate Civil War: Spider-Ham		#1	Mar 2007	one-shot	
Ultimate Comics: Spider-Man		#1–28; 16.1 200	Nov 2011 – Jun 2014	also known as Ultimate Comics: All-New Spider-Man	
Ultimate Comics Wolverine		#1–4	May 2013 – Jul 2013	limited series	
Ultimate Comics X-Men		#1–33; 18.1	Nov 2011 – Dec 2013		
Ultimate Daredevil and Elektra		#1–4	Jan 2003 – Mar 2003	limited series	
Ultimate Doom		#1–4	Feb 2011 – May 2011	limited series	
Ultimate Elektra		#1–5	Oct 2004 – Feb 2005	limited series	
Ultimate End		#1–5	Jul 2015 – Feb 2016	limited series; Secret Wars (2015) tie-in	
Ultimate Endgame		#1–5	Feb 2026 – Aug 2026	limited series	
Ultimate Enemy		#1–4	Apr 2010 – Jul 2010	limited series	
Ultimate Extinction		#1–5	Mar 2006 – Jul 2006	limited series	
Ultimate Fallout		#1–6	Sep 2011 – Oct 2011	limited series	
Ultimate Fantastic Four		#1–60	Feb 2004 – Apr 2009		
Ultimate Fantastic Four		Annual #1–2	Oct 2005 – Oct 2006		
Ultimate Fantastic Four/Ultimate X-Men	vol. 1	#1	Mar 2006	one-shot	
Ultimate Fantastic Four/Ultimate X-Men	vol. 2	Annual #1	Nov 2008	one-shot	
Ultimate FF		#1–6	Jun 2014 – Oct 2014	limited series	
Ultimate Hawkeye	vol. 1	#1–4	Oct 2011 – Jan 2012	limited series	
Ultimate Hawkeye	vol. 2	#1	Nov 2025	one-shot	
Ultimate Hulk		Annual #1	Dec 2008	one-shot	
Ultimate Human		#1–4	Mar 2008 – Jun 2008	limited series	
Ultimate Impact: Reborn		#1–5	Jul 2026 – Nov 2026	limited series	
Ultimate Invasion		#1–4	Aug 2023 – Nov 2023	limited series	
Ultimate Iron Man	vol. 1	#1–5	May 2005 – Feb 2006	limited series	
Ultimate Iron Man	vol. 2	#1–4	Dec 2012 – Mar 2013	limited series	
Ultimate Iron Man	II	#1–5	Feb 2008 – Jul 2008	limited series	
Ultimate Marvel Team-Up		#1–16	Apr 2001 – Jul 2002	first issue listed in indicia as Ultimate Spider-Man and Wolverine	
Ultimate Mystery		#1–4	Sep 2010 – Dec 2010	limited series	
Ultimate New Ultimates		#1–5	May 2010 – Apr 2011	limited series	
Ultimate Nightmare		#1–5	Oct 2004 – Feb 2005	limited series	
Ultimate Origins		#1–5	Aug 2008 – Dec 2008	limited series	
Ultimate Power		#1–9	Dec 2006 – Feb 2008	limited series	
Ultimate Secret		#1–4	May 2005 – Dec 2005	limited series	
Ultimate Secrets		#1	Mar 2008	one-shot	
Ultimate Six		#1–7	Nov 2003 – Jun 2004	limited series	
Ultimate Spider-Man	vol. 1	#1–133	Oct 2000 – Jun 2009		
Ultimate Spider-Man	vol. 1	Annual #1–3	Oct 2005 – Dec 2008		
Ultimate Spider-Man	vol. 1	Super Special #1	Jul 2002		
Ultimate Spider-Man	vol. 2	#1–15 150–160	Oct 2009 – Aug 2011		
Ultimate Spider-Man	vol. 3	#1–24	Mar 2024 – Apr 2026		
Ultimate Spider-Man	Incursion	#1–5	Aug 2025 – Dec 2025	limited series	
Ultimate Thor		#1–4	Dec 2010 – Apr 2011		
Ultimate Universe		#1	Jan 2024	one-shot	
Ultimate Universe	Finale	#1	Aug 2026	one-shot	
Ultimate Universe	One Year In	#1	Feb 2025	one-shot	
Ultimate Universe	Two Years In	#1	Feb 2026	one-shot	
Ultimate Vision		#0–5	Jan 2007 – Jan 2008	limited series	
Ultimate War		#1–4	Feb 2003 – Apr 2003	limited series	
Ultimate Wolverine		#1–16	Mar 2025 – Jun 2026		
Ultimate Wolverine vs. Hulk		#1–6	Feb 2006 – Jul 2009	limited series three year gap between issues 2 and 3	
Ultimate X		#1–5	Apr 2010 – Aug 2011	limited series	
Ultimate X-Men	vol. 1	#1–100	Feb 2001 – Mar 2009		
Ultimate X-Men	vol. 1	Annual #1–2	Oct 2005 – Oct 2006		
Ultimate X-Men	vol. 2	#1–24	May 2024 – Apr 2026		
Ultimate X-Men/Fantastic Four	vol.1	#1	Feb 2006	one-shot	
Ultimate X-Men/Fantastic Four	vol. 2	Annual #1	Nov 2008	one-shot	
The Ultimates	vol. 1	#1–13	Mar 2002 – Apr 2004	limited series	
The Ultimates	vol. 2	#1–30 18.1	Oct 2011 – Nov 2013		
The Ultimates	vol. 3	#1–12	Jan 2016 – Dec 2016		
The Ultimates	vol. 4	#1–24	Aug 2024 – Jul 2026		
The Ultimates 2	vol. 1	#1–13	Feb 2005 – Feb 2007	limited series	
The Ultimates 2	vol. 1	Annual #1–2	Oct 2005 – Oct 2006		
The Ultimates 2	vol. 2	#1–9; 100	Jan 2018 – Oct 2018	renumbered after #9 to #100	
The Ultimates 3		#1–5	Feb 2008 – Nov 2008	limited series	
Ultimates Saga			Nov 2007	one-shot	
Ultimatum		#1–5	Jan 2009 – Jul 2009	limited series	
Ultimatum	Fantastic Four Requiem	#1	Oct 2009	one-shot	
Ultimatum	Spider-Man Requiem	#1–2	Aug 2009 – Sep 2009	limited series	
Ultimatum	X-Men Requiem	#1	Oct 2009	one-shot	
Ultragirl		#1–3	Nov 1996 – Jan 1997	limited series	
Ultraman: The Mystery of Ultraseven		#1–5	Oct 2022 – Mar 2023	limited series	
Ultraman X The Avengers		#1–4	Oct 2024 – Apr 2025	limited series	
Ultron		#1AU	Jun 2013	one-shot	
The Unbeatable Squirrel Girl	vol. 1	#1–8	Mar 2015 – Oct 2015		
The Unbeatable Squirrel Girl	vol. 2	#1–50	Dec 2015 – Jan 2020		
The Unbeatable Squirrel Girl	Beats Up the Marvel Universe		2016	graphic novel	
The Unbelievable Gwenpool		#1–25	Jun 2016 – Apr 2018		
Unbreakable X-Men		#1–3	Dec 2025 – Feb 2026	limited series; Age of Revelation tie-in	
Uncanny Avengers	vol. 1	#1–25 #8AU	Dec 2012 – Dec 2014		
Uncanny Avengers	vol. 1	Annual #1	Jun 2014		
Uncanny Avengers	vol. 2	#1–5	Mar 2015 – Aug 2015		
Uncanny Avengers	vol. 3	#1–30	Dec 2015 – Feb 2018		
Uncanny Avengers	vol. 3	Annual #1	Jan 2016		
Uncanny Avengers	vol. 4	#1–5	Oct 2023 – Feb 2024	limited series; Fall of X tie-in	
Uncanny Avengers	Ultron Forever	#1	Jul 2015	one-shot	
Uncanny Inhumans		#0–20 1.MU	Jun 2015 – May 2017		
Uncanny Inhumans		Annual #1	Oct 2016		
Uncanny Origins		#1–14	Sep 1996 – Oct 1997		
Uncanny Spider-Man		#1–5	Nov 2023 – Feb 2024	limited series; Fall of X tie-in	
Uncanny Tales	vol. 2	#1–12	Dec 1973 – Oct 1975	vol. 1 was published by Atlas Comics	
Uncanny X-Force	vol. 1	#1–35 5.1, 19.1	Dec 2010 – Feb 2013		
Uncanny X-Force	vol. 2	#1–17	Mar 2013 – Mar 2014		
Uncanny X-Men	vol. 1 (Note: Some sources include these issues as part of the original 1963 X-Men series.)	#142–544 -1; 534.1	Feb 1981 – Dec 2011	continued from The X-Men vol. 1	
Uncanny X-Men	vol. 1	Annual #5–18	1981 – 1994		
Uncanny X-Men	vol. 1	'95, '96, '97	1995 – 1997	Annuals	
Uncanny X-Men	vol. 1	Uncanny X-Men/Fantastic Four '98	1998	Annual	
Uncanny X-Men	vol. 1	1999, 2000, 2001	1999 – 2001	Annuals	
Uncanny X-Men	vol. 1	Annual (vol. 2) #1–3	Aug 2006 – May 2011		
Uncanny X-Men	vol. 2	#1–20	Jan 2012 – Dec 2012		
Uncanny X-Men	vol. 3	#1–35; 600	Apr 2013 – Jan 2016	renumbered after #35 to #600	
Uncanny X-Men	vol. 3	Annual #1	Feb 2015		
Uncanny X-Men	vol. 3	Special #1	Aug 2014		
Uncanny X-Men	vol. 4	#1–19	Mar 2016 – May 2017		
Uncanny X-Men	vol. 4	Annual #1	Jan 2017		
Uncanny X-Men	vol. 5	#1–22	Jan 2019 – Sep 2019		
Uncanny X-Men	vol. 5	Annual #1	Mar 2019		
Uncanny X-Men	vol. 6	#1–	Oct 2024 – present		
Uncanny X-Men	vol. 6	Annual #1	2026		
Uncanny X-Men	First Class	#1–8	Sep 2009 – Apr 2010	limited series	
Uncanny X-Men	First Class	Giant-Size Special #1	Aug 2009		
Uncanny X-Men	The Heroic Age	#1	Sep 2010	one-shot	
Uncanny X-Men	Winter's End	#1	May 2019	one-shot	
The Uncanny X-Men and the New Teen Titans		#1	Jan 1982	one-shot; co-published with DC	
Uncle Scrooge: A Christmas Carol		#1	Jan 2027	one-shot	
Uncle Scrooge and the Infinity Dime		#1	Aug 2024	one-shot	
Uncle Scrooge: Earth's Mightiest Duck		#1–4	Oct 2025 – Jan 2026	limited series	
The Undead Iron Fist		#1–4	Nov 2025 – Feb 2026	limited series	
Undeadpool		#1–3	Dec 2025 – Feb 2026	limited series; Age of Revelation tie-in	
Underworld		#1–5	Apr 2006 – Aug 2006	limited series	
Unforgiven	Captain America	#1	Jun 2023	one-shot; also known as Captain America: Unforgiven; part 3 of 3	
Unforgiven	Spider-Man	#1	May 2023	one-shot; also known as Spider-Man: Unforgiven; part 1 of 3	
Unforgiven	X-Men	#1	May 2023	one-shot; also known as X-Men: Unforgiven; part 2 of 3	
Unholy Union		#1	Jul 2007	one-shot; co-published with Top Cow Productions	
The Union		#1–5	Feb 2021 – Jul 2021	limited series; originally solicited as Empyre tie-in; published as King in Black tie-in	
Union Jack	vol. 1	#1–3	Dec 1998 – Feb 1999	limited series	
Union Jack	vol. 2	#1–4	Nov 2006 – Feb 2007	limited series	
Union Jack the Ripper: Blood Hunt		#1–3	Jul 2024 – Sep 2024	limited series	
The United States Of Captain America		#1–5	Aug 2021 – Dec 2021	limited series	
Universal War One		#1–3	Sep 2008 – Nov 2008	limited series	
Universal War One	Revelations	#1–3	May 2009 – Jul 2009	limited series	
Universe X		#0–12; X	Sep 2000 – Nov 2001	limited series	
Universe X	4	#1	Oct 2000	one-shot	
Universe X	Beasts	#1	Jun 2001	one-shot	
Universe X	Cap	#1	Feb 2001	one-shot	
Universe X	Iron Men	#1	Sep 2001	one-shot	
Universe X	Spidey	#1	Jan 2001	one-shot	
Unlimited Access		#1–4	Dec 1997 – Mar 1998	limited series; published in association with DC	
The Unstoppable Wasp	vol. 1	#1–8	Mar 2017 – Oct 2017		
The Unstoppable Wasp	vol. 2	#1–10	Dec 2018 – Sep 2019		
The Untold Legend of Captain Marvel		#1–3	Apr 1997 – Jun 1997	limited series	
Untold Tales of Punisher Max		#1–5	Aug 2012 – Dec 2012	limited series	
Untold Tales of Spider-Man		#1–25 -1	Sep 1995 – Oct 1997		
Untold Tales of Spider-Man		'96, '97	1996–1997	Annuals	
Untold Tales of Spider-Man	Strange Encounters	#1	Jan 1998	one-shot; also known as Untold Tales of Spider-Man: Strange Encounter	
Untold Tales of the New Universe	D.P.7	#1	May 2006	one-shot	
Untold Tales of the New Universe	Justice	#1	May 2006	one-shot	
Untold Tales of the New Universe	Nightmask	#1	May 2006	one-shot	
Untold Tales of the New Universe	Psi-Force	#1	May 2006	one-shot	
Untold Tales of the New Universe	Star Brand	#1	May 2006	one-shot	
The Unworthy Thor		#1–5	Jan 2017 – May 2017	limited series	
U.S. 1		#1–12	May 1983 – Oct 1984	limited series	
USA Comics 70th Anniversary Special		#1	Sep 2009	one-shot	
U.S. Agent	vol. 1	#1–4	Jun 1993 – Sep 1993	limited series	
U.S. Agent	vol. 2	#1–3	Aug 2001 – Oct 2001	limited series	
U.S. Agent	vol. 3	#1–5	Jan 2021 – Jun 2021	limited series	
U.S.Avengers		#1–12	Mar 2017 – Jan 2018		
U.S. War Machine		#1–12	Nov 2001 – Jan 2002	limited series	
U.S. War Machine	2.0	#1–3	Sep 2003	limited series	

== V ==
Title	Series	Issues	Dates	Notes	Reference
Valkyrie	vol. 1	#1	Jan 1997	one-shot	
Valkyrie	vol. 2	#1	Nov 2010	one-shot	
Valkyrie: Jane Foster		#1–10	Sep 2019 – Oct 2020		
Vampires: The Marvel Undead		#1	Dec 2011	one-shot	
The Variants		#1–5	Aug 2022 – Feb 2023	limited series	
Vault of Evil		#1–23	Feb 1973 – Nov 1975		
Vault of Spiders		#1–2	Dec 2018 – Jan 2019	limited series; Spider-Geddon tie-in	
Vengeance		#1–6	Sep 2011 – Feb 2012	limited series	
Vengeance of the Moon Knight	vol. 1	#1–10	Nov 2009 – Sep 2010		
Vengeance of the Moon Knight	vol. 2	#1–9	Mar 2024 – Nov 2024		
Venom	vol. 1	#1–18	Jun 2003 – Nov 2004		
Venom	vol. 2	#1–42; 13.1–13.4, 27.1	May 2011 – Dec 2013		
Venom	vol. 3	#1–6 150–154	Jan 2017 – Nov 2017	renumbered after #6 to #150, continuing from Venom: Lethal Protector	
Venom	vol. 4 (Note: Some sources include these issues with volume 1 and others with volume 3. The Marvel Legacy initiative for Venom began with issue #155, thus beginning a new volume.)	#155–165	Dec 2017 – Jun 2018	numbering continued from vol. 3	
Venom	vol. 5	#1–35	Jul 2018 – Aug 2021	issue #35 dual-numbered as #200	
Venom	vol. 5	Annual #1	Dec 2018		
Venom	vol. 5	Annual #1	Sep 2019	2nd Annual #1 published in this volume	
Venom	vol. 6	#1–39	Jan 2022 – Jan 2025		
Venom	vol. 6	Annual #1	2023		
Venom	vol. 7	#250–262	Dec 2025 – Nov 2026		
Venom	vol. 8	#1–	Dec 2026 – present		
Venom	Along Came a Spider	#1–4	Jan 1996 – Apr 1996	limited series	
Venom	Black, White & Blood	#1–4	Oct 2025 – Jan 2026	limited series	
Venom	Carnage Unleashed	#1–4	Apr 1995 – Jul 1995	limited series	
Venom	Dark Origin	#1–5	Oct 2008 – Feb 2009	limited series	
Venom	Deathtrap: The Vault		1993	graphic novel	
Venom	First Host	#1–5	Oct 2018 – Nov 2018	limited series	
Venom	Flashpoint	#1	Sep 2011	one-shot	
Venom	Funeral Pyre	#1–3	Aug 1993 – Oct 1993	limited series	
Venom	License to Kill	#1–3	Jun 1997 – Aug 1997	limited series	
Venom	Nights of Vengeance	#1–4	Aug 1994 – Nov 1994	limited series	
Venom	On Trial	#1–3	Mar 1997 – May 1997	limited series	
Venom	Original Sin	#1	Jul 2025	one-shot	
Venom	Seed of Darkness	#1	Jul 1997	one-shot	
Venom	Sign of the Boss	#1–2	Sep 1997 – Oct 1997	limited series	
Venom	Sinner Takes All	#1–5	Aug 1995 – Dec 1995	limited series	
Venom	Space Knight	#1–13	Jan 2016 – Dec 2016		
Venom	Super Special	#1	Aug 1995	one-shot	
Venom	The End	#1	Mar 2020	one-shot	
Venom	The Enemy Within	#1–3	Feb 1994 – May 1994	limited series	
Venom	The Finale	#1–3	Nov 1997 – Jan 1998	limited series	
Venom	The Hunger	#1–4	Aug 1996 – Nov 1996	limited series	
Venom	The Hunted	#1–3	May 1996 – Jul 1996	limited series	
Venom	The Mace	#1–3	May 1994 – Jul 1994	limited series	
Venom	The Madness	#1–3	Nov 1993 – Jan 1994	limited series	
Venom	Tooth and Claw	#1–3	Dec 1996 – Feb 1997	limited series	
Venom 2099		#1	Feb 2020	one-shot	
Venom: Lethal Protector	vol. 1	#1–6	Feb 1993 – Jul 1993	limited series	
Venom: Lethal Protector	vol. 2	#1–5	May 2022 – Oct 2022	limited series	
Venom: Lethal Protector	II	#1–5	May 2023 – Sep 2023	limited series	
Venom/Deadpool: What If?		#1	Apr 2011	one-shot	
Venom: Separation Anxiety	vol. 1	#1–4	Dec 1994 – Mar 1995	limited series	
Venom: Separation Anxiety	vol. 2	#1–5	Jul 2024 – Nov 2024	limited series	
Venom vs. Carnage		#1–4	Sep 2004 – Dec 2004	limited series	
Venom War		#1–5	Oct 2024 – Jan 2025	limited series	
Venom War	Carnage	#1–3	Oct 2024 – Dec 2024	limited series	
Venom War	Daredevil	#1	Nov 2024	one-shot	
Venom War	Deadpool	#1–3	Nov 2024 – Jan 2025	limited series	
Venom War	Fantastic Four	#1	Dec 2024	one-shot	
Venom War	It's Jeff	#1	Jan 2025	one-shot	
Venom War	Lethal Protectors	#1–3	Nov 2024 – Jan 2025	limited series	
Venom War	Spider-Man	#1–4	Oct 2024 – Jan 2025	limited series	
Venom War	Venomous	#1–3	Oct 2024 – Dec 2024	limited series	
Venom War	Wolverine	#1–3	Nov 2024 – Jan 2025	limited series	
Venom War	Zombiotes	#1–3	Oct 2024 – Dec 2024	limited series	
Venomized		#1–5	Jun 2018 – Jul 2018	limited series	
Venomverse		#1–5	Nov 2017 – Mar 2018	limited series	
Venomverse	Reborn	#1–4	Aug 2024 – Nov 2024	limited series	
Venomverse	War Stories	#1	Nov 2017	one-shot	
Villains for Hire		#0.1; 1–4	Jan 2012 – May 2012	limited series	
Virtua Fighter		#1	Aug 1995	one-shot; video game tie-in	
Vision	vol. 1	#1–4	Nov 1994 – Feb 1995	limited series; labeled as "The Vision"	
Vision	vol. 2	#1–4	Oct 2002 – Jan 2003	limited series; also known as Avengers Icons: The Vision	
Vision	vol. 3	#1–12	Jan 2016 – Dec 2016	limited series; labeled as "The Vision"	
The Vision and the Scarlet Witch	vol. 1	#1–4	Nov 1982 – Feb 1983	limited series	
The Vision and the Scarlet Witch	vol. 2	#1–12	Oct 1985 – Sep 1986	limited series	
The Vision and the Scarlet Witch	vol. 3	#1–5	Jul 2025 – Nov 2025	limited series	
Vote Loki		#1–4	Aug 2016 – Nov 2016	limited series	
