= Choo-Choo Charles =

2022 horror video game

- Steam artwork
- Developer: Two Star Games
- Publisher: Two Star Games
- Designer: Gavin Eisenbeisz
- Engine: Unreal Engine 4
- Platforms: Windows; PlayStation 4; PlayStation 5; Xbox One; Xbox Series X/S; Nintendo Switch; Android; iOS
- Release: Windows; December 9, 2022; PS4, PS5, Xbox One, Xbox Series X/S; December 21, 2023; Nintendo Switch; January 18, 2024; Android, iOS; June 8, 2026
- Genre: Survival horror
- Mode: Single-player

Choo-Choo Charles is a 2022 survival horror game developed and published by Two Star Games. The player controls a monster-hunting archivist with the goal of upgrading their train's defenses in order to fight and defeat the titular character, Charles, an evil spider-train hybrid monster that wanders the landscape looking for people to eat.

After the first trailer was released in 2021, it went viral on the Internet, provoking reactions on websites such as Twitter and Reddit. This led the game to receive a spot in Time's list of most anticipated 2022 video games. The game received mixed reviews from critics.

== Gameplay ==
Gameplay consists of travelling across an open world map in a train, performing tasks for NPCs (non-player characters), collecting loot, and using that loot to upgrade the player's train in order to fight against Charles, who periodically hunts for the player and can be fought off using the gun mounted to it. The goal of the game is to collect three glowing eggs that will summon Charles to battle the player as a final boss. The game takes players around three to five hours to fully complete.

The map is an island lined with interconnected railway tracks, which carry the player's train to a series of locations where quests can be completed for non-player characters. There are four main NPCs that progress the main quest. Besides Charles, the player also faces armed cultist enemies, who guard the three glowing eggs needed to complete the game. The game encourages players to use stealth to sneak past these guards to steal the eggs and escape without notice, although it is also possible to simply run past them and either kill them with the train's guns or run them over. The game's optional quests generally consist of fetching objects for non-player characters in exchange for new weapons and other rewards.

== Plot ==
The player controls an unnamed archivist and monster hunter simply known as "the Archivist", who is summoned to the island of Aranearum by their friend Eugene to help deal with Charles, a man-eating locomotive/spider monster who has been terrorizing the island. Upon arrival, Charles attacks them and kills Eugene, but not before he tells the Archivist to find Charles' eggs, which they can use to summon and fight Charles, and gives them a train mounted with a machine gun to traverse the island and fend off Charles.

Eugene's son Paul and the inhabitants of the island have formulated a plan to defeat Charles, but they need the Archivist to execute it. The Archivist is given the goal of traversing the island to meet with various non-player characters. These characters give the Archivist keys to the mines where Charles' glowing eggs are located, scraps with which to upgrade the train, and additional weapons like a flamethrower, rocket launcher, and anti-tank cannon to better fend off Charles. The Archivist also comes into contact with cultists led by mining company owner Warren Charles III, who seemingly plan on using Charles for world domination. They learn that Warren is responsible for causing Charles' awakening, having discovered Charles' eggs after digging too deep during a mining operation.

After collecting all three eggs, the Archivist summons Charles, who transforms into "Hell Charles" and devours Warren before chasing and attacking the Archivist. After a grueling battle, which involves the Archivist quickly swapping guns and using scraps to refuel the train, the Archivist successfully lures Charles onto a bridge that they and Paul rigged with explosives, and detonates it, sending Charles plummeting face-first onto one the bridge's wooden support beams, instantly killing him. In a post-credits scene, it is revealed that Charles has hundreds of eggs hiding in a cavern, which indicates that Charles may eventually return.

== Development and release ==
Choo-Choo Charles was developed by Gavin Eisenbeisz using Unreal Engine 4's Blueprint visual script. He recorded the development process in blogs on YouTube.

Eisenbeisz has stated that while the corruption of childhood joy and innocence is a popular theme in horror, he wanted Choo-Choo Charles to be unique in that it is based on a popular children's TV show; namely, Thomas & Friends, starring Thomas the Tank Engine. This was his favorite kids' show when he was young. Choo-Choo Charles was largely inspired by the 3D horror animation Thomas Feeds by Tom Coben which depicts Thomas the Tank Engine as a monstrous spider-train hybrid. The animation was published in November 2020 to Coben's YouTube channel. Inspiration was likely also gleaned from Charlie the Choo-Choo, a 2016 children's book written by Stephen King (under the pseudonym "Beryl Evans") as part of The Dark Tower series.

The game was released for Windows on December 9, 2022, under his company Two Star Games, although Eisenbeisz stated that he had plans to port the game to consoles as well. On December 21, 2023, the game was released for Xbox One, Xbox Series X and Series S, PlayStation 4, and PlayStation 5.

On October 26, 2023, Eisenbeisz updated the game with a "Nightmare Mode", which makes the game significantly harder than usual, adding permadeath and buffing enemies. A new soundtrack was also composed for the new difficulty.

== Reception ==
Reception

Aggregate score
Aggregator	Score
Metacritic	56/100

Review scores
Publication	Score
Destructoid	6.5/10
IGN	4/10

Choo-Choo Charles received a 56/100 on review aggregate site Metacritic, indicating "mixed or average reviews".

Steve Hogarty of Rock Paper Shotgun described the game as "shonky, very short and frustrating to play for any length of time". He said that the game had a good concept, but that the concept was stretched too thinly. Zack Zwiezen of Kotaku praised the originality and the ideas, but criticized the game for its reliance on "bad stealth sections", a lack of scares, and the short length of the game. Travis Northup from IGN gave the game a score of 4/10, describing it as "janky", "barebones", and "more dull than [he] thought possible". He also described the on-foot stealth sections as "aggressively not fun". Zoey Handley from Destructoid scored the game 6.5/10, describing it as "alright".
