= The Dark Tower: The Drawing of the Three - Lady of Shadows =

- Cover of The Dark Tower: The Drawing of the Three - Lady of Shadows #1 (Sep., 2015)

Publication information
- Publisher: Marvel Comics
- Schedule: "Monthly"
- Format: Limited series
- Publication date: Sep., 2015 - Jan., 2016
- No. of issues: 5

Creative team
- Created by: Stephen King
- Written by: Robin Furth (adaptation); Peter David (script)
- Artist(s): Jonathan Marks, Lee Loughridge, Nimit Malavia

The Dark Tower: The Drawing of the Three - Lady of Shadows is a five-issue comic book limited series published by Marvel Comics. It is the thirteenth comic book miniseries based on Stephen King's The Dark Tower series of novels. It is plotted by Robin Furth, scripted by Peter David, and illustrated by Jonathan Marks and Lee Loughridge, with covers by Nimit Malavia. Stephen King is the Creative and Executive Director of the project. The first issue was published on September 2, 2015.

Preceded by	Followed by
The Dark Tower: The Drawing of the Three - House of Cards	The Dark Tower: The Drawing of the Three - Bitter Medicine

== Publication dates ==
- Issue #1: September 2, 2015
- Issue #2: October 7, 2015
- Issue #3: November 18, 2015
- Issue #4: December 16, 2015
- Issue #5: January 20, 2016

== Collected editions ==
The entire five-issue run of Lady of Shadows was collected into a paperback edition, released by Marvel on March 29, 2016 (ISBN 0785192824).

== See also ==
- The Dark Tower (comics)
