= The Dark Tower: The Drawing of the Three - Bitter Medicine =

- Cover of The Dark Tower: The Drawing of the Three - Bitter Medicine #1 (Apr., 2016)

Publication information
- Publisher: Marvel Comics
- Schedule: "Monthly"
- Format: Limited series
- Publication date: Apr. - Aug., 2016
- No. of issues: 5

Creative team
- Created by: Stephen King
- Written by: Robin Furth (adaptation); Peter David (script)
- Artist(s): Jonathan Marks, Lee Loughridge, Nimit Malavia

The Dark Tower: The Drawing of the Three - Bitter Medicine is a five-issue comic book limited series published by Marvel Comics. It is the fourteenth comic book miniseries based on Stephen King's The Dark Tower series of novels. It is plotted by Robin Furth, scripted by Peter David, and illustrated by Jonathan Marks and Lee Loughridge, with covers by Nimit Malavia. Stephen King is the Creative and Executive Director of the project. The first issue was published on April 20, 2016.

Preceded by	Followed by
The Dark Tower: The Drawing of the Three - Lady of Shadows	The Dark Tower: The Drawing of the Three - The Sailor

== Publication dates ==
- Issue #1: April 20, 2016
- Issue #2: May 11, 2016
- Issue #3: June 8, 2016
- Issue #4: July 13, 2016
- Issue #5: August 31, 2016

== Collected editions ==
The entire five-issue run of Bitter Medicine was collected into a paperback edition, released by Marvel on October 18, 2016 (ISBN 0785192808).

== See also ==
- The Dark Tower (comics)
