= Spider-Man: House of M =

Marvel comic book series from 2005

- Cover for Spider-Man: House of M #1 (August 2005). Art by Salvador Larroca & Danny Miki

Publication information
- Publisher: Marvel Comics
- Format: Limited series
- Publication date: August – December 2005
- No. of issues: 5
- Main character(s): Peter Parker / Spider-Man / Green Goblin; J. Jonah Jameson

Creative team
- Written by: Mark Waid; Tom Peyer
- Penciller: Salvador Larroca
- Inker: Danny Miki
- Colorist: Liquid Graphics

Spider-Man: House of M is a five-issue comic book limited series that ran concurrently with Marvel Comics' House of M crossover event in 2005. In the House of M pocket universe, mutants rule the world and humans are an oppressed minority. Magneto and his family, the House of M, rule the world from the island of Genosha.

Much like the Fantastic Four: House of M miniseries, Spider-Man: House of M is a standalone story that takes place in the House of M universe, but the events do not affect the story of the actual House of M series. However, it is shown in the House of M series that the Peter Parker of the mainstream Marvel Universe remembers the life he had in this pocket universe.

== Plot ==
In the House of M universe, Spider-Man is famous for being an actor, super-hero, wrestler, and businessman. His identity as Peter Parker is known to the public, who believes he is a mutant and thus born with his powers. His uncle Ben Parker, first love Gwen Stacy and Gwen's father George Stacy are all alive; Peter and Gwen are married and have a son together. Crusher Hogan aka the "Green Goblin" is his mentor. Rhino is Peter's bodyguard, even though he is not needed. J. Jonah Jameson, after years of publishing anti-Spider-Man articles, takes a high-paying job as Peter's publicist, where Peter constantly humiliates him in public.

At Peter's surprise birthday party, Jameson is attacked by the Green Goblin, who states his intention to use Jameson to destroy Spider-Man. Jameson awakens the next morning holding Peter's journal, part of which explains how he got his powers and that he is not a mutant. Spider-Man searches all over the city to find Jameson, but it's too late. J. Jonah Jameson, with a camera crew, reveals the truth in Spider-Man's journal.

After the news breaks, a mutant boy is beaten half to death for wearing a Spider-Man shirt. Peter visits the boy at the hospital, where he meets a mutant security guard who expresses respect for Spider-Man. An announcement comes in that Rhino is causing havoc downtown. The guard turns to face Peter, but sees only an open window.

Spider-Man tries to stop Rhino from destroying downtown, but gets attacked by angry mutant pedestrians. Rhino escapes and meets the Green Goblin, who he tells to meet him behind Parker's house tonight. As soon as Green Goblin arrives, he sees that Ox, Vulture, and Electro are there as well, and they all attack the Green Goblin. During the fight, Gwen Stacy runs to see what's going on. Rhino grabs the Green Goblin and lets Gwen take his mask off, revealing Peter Parker.

It is revealed that Peter has been having recurring nightmares of horrifying events that Spider-Man faced in the true Marvel Universe, including the deaths of Ben, George, and Gwen. Thinking him insane, his family believes that Peter may have subconsciously created his Green Goblin persona to force the truth of his non-mutant origins to come out.

In the end, Spider-Man fakes his own death, leaving a note for the House of M, threatening to come back if Magneto does not "lay off the humans." The Parker family is last seen somewhere in the countryside, contentedly building their new home away from mutant civilization. For this story to fit in with the larger story told in the House of M miniseries, the Parker family would have had to return to New York at some point, as it was there that Wolverine and the rest of the memory-restored heroes introduced him to Layla Miller.

== Sequels ==
- An issue of What If...? had two alternative stories that could have happened from the Spider-Man: House of M story, including Gwen Stacy accompanying the heroes in the final assault and Gwen and Richard Parker being restored to the real world after Wanda cast her final spell.
- When the 'Superior Spider-Man' - Doctor Octopus in Spider-Man's body - found himself temporarily trapped in the year 2099, his attempts to return home via a dimensional portal resulted in him witnessing various alternate worlds where other Spider-Men had been killed by a dimension-hopping adversary, including a dead Spider-Man in what appeared to be the world of the House of M.

== In other media ==
- The "House of M" Goblin appears as a boss in the phone app "Spider-Man Unlimited". The "House of M" Spider-Man also appears as a playable character.
