= Salvador Larroca =

Spanish comic artist

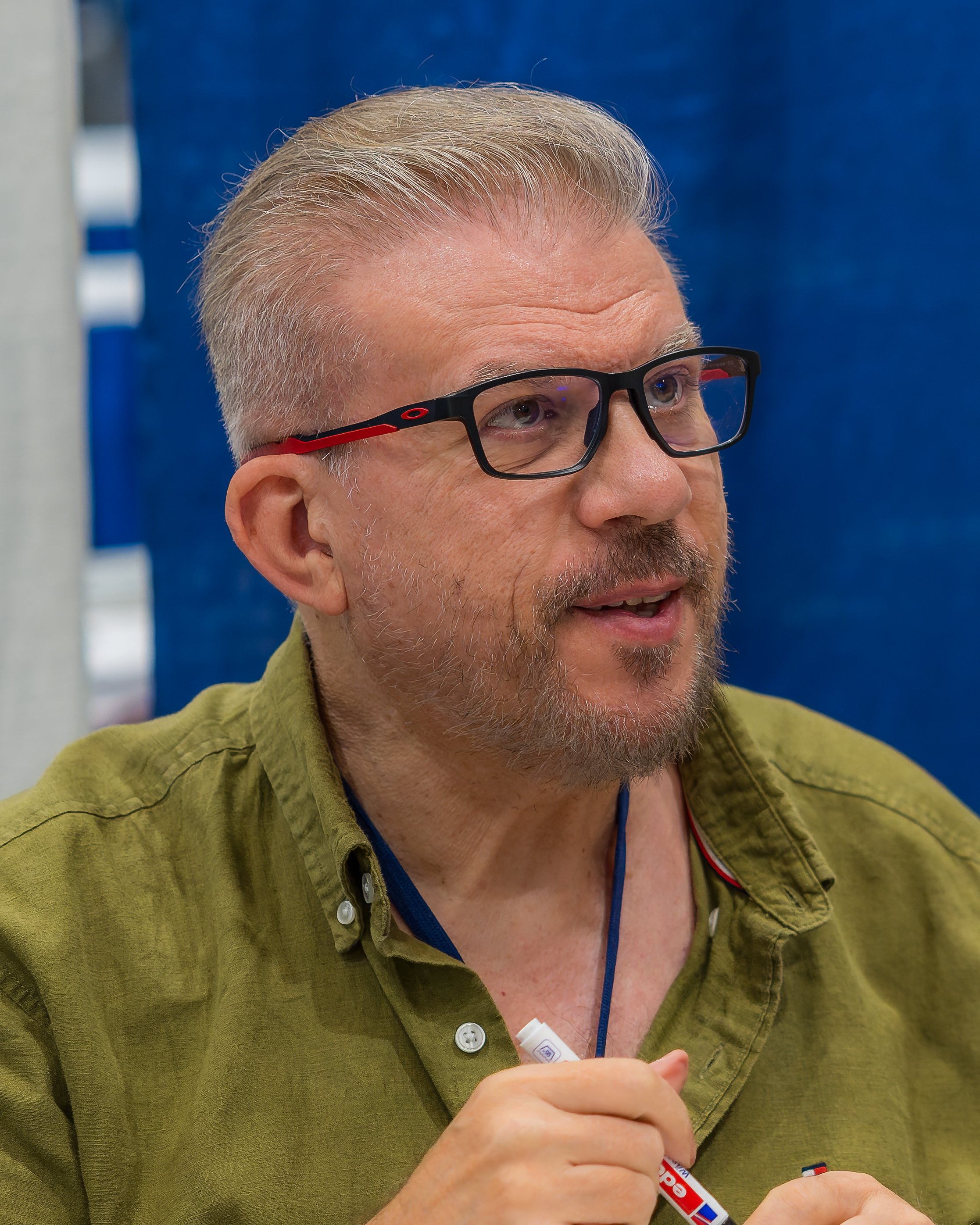
- Larroca in 2026
- Born: Solvador Lorroca Martinez; July 28, 1964 (age 62) Valencia, Spain
- Areas: Penciller, Inker
- Notable works: Iron Man; Ultimate Elektra; X-Treme X-Men; Ghost Rider
- Awards: Inkwell Awards 2024 All-in-One Award

Solvador Martinez (/ləˈroʊkə/; born July 28,1964) is a Spanish comic book artist, primarily known for his American work on various X-Men titles for Marvel Comics.

After starting his career as a cartographer, Larroca transitioned to working as a comics artist in the 1980s at Marvel UK, contributing to Dark Angel and Death's Head II. He then did work in North American comics, including DC Comics' Flash and Marvel Comics' Ghost Rider, Heroes Return, Fantastic Four, The Invincible Iron Man, and various titles related to the X-Men franchise and Ultimate Marvel imprint.

Larocca has also provided artwork for Marvel's spinoffs and licensed books, such as Star Wars in the 2010s and Alien in 2021. His work on the former attracted criticism for his heavy reliance on tracing stills from Star Wars films, resulting in an "awkward hyperrealism" that was likened to the uncanny valley effect.

== Career ==
After several years of working as a cartographer, he began working as a comic artist at Marvel UK, the Britain-based imprint of Marvel Comics. Larroca was working at Marvel UK when he contributed to Dark Angel and Death's Head II. At some point, Larroca began to work on mainstream North American comics, such as DC Comics' Flash. Afterwards, Larroca did a three-year run on Marvel Comics' Ghost Rider, during the mid-1990s. It was not until after his run on Ghost Rider, that Larroca would gain the exposure needed to become known as one of the most prominent comic book artists in the United States.

Following Marvel's experiment with the various "Heroes Reborn" titles, editor Bobbie Chase gave Larroca the task of penciling the return of Captain America, Iron Man, Fantastic Four, the Avengers, and several other superheroes, in the Heroes Return miniseries. After the departure of Alan Davis on Fantastic Four, Larroca was given the reins along with writer Chris Claremont. Larroca and Claremont had a three-year-long run on the title.

Larroca left the title penciling chores in the hands of new writer/penciler, Carlos Pacheco, while Larroca went on to do several issues of Uncanny X-Men, after the departure of Adam Kubert, who left to work on Ultimate X-Men. Larroca then proceeded to rejoin with writer Chris Claremont, on X-Treme X-Men. Larroca stayed on the title for twenty-four issues, at which point he was asked to work on the initial run of Marvel's new Tsunami imprint title, called Namor. Meanwhile, Larroca worked on various miniseries projects, including Ultimate Daredevil & Elektra and Ultimate Elektra.

Larroca was asked to draw fill-in issues of The Uncanny X-Men and X-Men. These issues led up to the "X-Men Reload" event, as the titles gained new writers, artists, and story direction. Larroca joined with writer Chuck Austen on X-Men. During his run of X-Men, Larroca took a side job drawing Spider-Man: House of M miniseries. Larroca was drawing X-Men, but with a new writer on the title, Peter Milligan. He left X-Men in June and was announced to be joining Warren Ellis on newuniversal, a remake of Marvel's New Universe.

From 2008 to 2012, Larroca illustrated writer Matt Fraction's run on The Invincible Iron Man.

In December 2020, Marvel announced that Larroca would be teaming up with writer Phillip Kennedy Johnson on an Alien comic book series, with the first issue released in March 2021.

In 2024, Larroca was awarded the Inkwell Awards All-in-One Award.

== Criticism ==
James Whitbrook, reviewing the "Ashes of Jedha" storyline in Marvel Comics' Star Wars series for Kotaku, took issue with what he felt was Larroca's heavy reliance on tracing stills from Star Wars films when rendering the characters, which imbued the characters' faces with an "awkward hyperrealism" that he felt evoked the effect of the uncanny valley. While Whitbrook did not observe this problem in his work on other Star Wars arcs, and praised Larroca's work in rendering large-scale elements such as starships or planets, he felt that in many closeups of the three main characters in "Jedha," the illustrations too closely mirrored the images from the films, often from scenes in which the actors' facial expressions did not match the tone or dialogue of the characters in the comic. Charlie Hall, reviewing the same storyline for Polygon, expressed the same viewpoint, and like Whitbrook, compared these renditions to the work of Angel Unzueta and Arif Prianto on the Poe Dameron series, which they felt rendered the characters to sufficiently resemble or recognizably evoke the actors who played them, without exhibiting the sense that they were "pasted" from reference materials.

== Bibliography ==
Cover to X-Men #169. Art by Salvador Larroca.

=== Marvel ===
- Alien #1-9 (2021-2022)
- Amazing Spider-Man #549-551 (2008)
- Avengers: The Initiative Annual #1 (2008)
- Avengers (vol. 5) #25–28 (2014)
- Cable #24 (1995)
- Cable and X-Force #1–14 (2013)
- Darth Vader #1–25 (2015–2016)
- Death of Wolverine: The Weapon X #1–3 (2014)
- Doctor Aphra #1 (2016)
- Eminem/Punisher (published on Marvel website; not for sale) (2009)
- Excalibur #107–110 (1997)
- Fantastic Four, vol. 3, #4–34 (1998–2000)
- Fantastic Four 2000 (2000)
- Fear Itself ("Iron Man") #7.3 (2011)
- Gambit and the X-Ternals, miniseries, #3–4 (1995)
- Generation X/Gen 13 (1997)
- Ghost Rider, vol. 3, #51–69, 72, 75–81 (1994–97)
- Heroes Reborn: The Return, miniseries, #1–4 (1997)
- Incredible Hulk Annual #20 (1994)
- Iron Man, vol. 3, #15 (among other artists) (1999)
- Invincible Iron Man #1–33, then continued from #500–527 (2008–12)
- Mighty Avengers vol. 2, #13 (2014)
- Monsters Unleashed, vol. 2 #4 (2017)
- Namor, miniseries, #1–6 (2003)
- Newuniversal, miniseries, #1–6 (2007)
- Point One, one-shot, ("Yin & Yang") (2012)
- Psylocke & Archangel: Crimson Dawn, miniseries, #1–4 (1997)
- The Sensational Spider-Man Annual #1 (2007)
- Secrets of the House of M, one-shot (along with other artists)
- Spider-Man: House of M, miniseries, #1–5 (2005)
- Stan Lee Meets Dr. Doom (2006)
- Star Wars, vol. 2 #26–55 (2017–2018)
- Ultimate Daredevil and Elektra, miniseries, #1–4 (2003)
- Ultimate Elektra, miniseries, #1–5 (2004–05)
- Ultimate Fallout, miniseries (Reed Richards)#4 (2011)
- Ultimate X-Men #88–93, Annual #2 (2006–08)
- Uncanny Avengers #12, 24 (2013–2014)
- Uncanny X-Men #387–392, 439–443, 487–491 (2000–07)
- Uncanny X-Men, vol. 5 #11–16, 20–22 (2019)
- X-Men, vol. 2, (then New X-Men) #69, 155–179, 182–187 (1997–2006)
- X-Men: No More Humans, graphic novel, (2014)
- X-Men Unlimited (Kitty Pryde) #36 (2002)
- X-Men: Declassified (among other artists) (2000)
- X-Treme X-Men #1–24, Annual 2001 (2001–03)

=== Other publishers ===
- Dark Angel #11–16 (Marvel UK, 1993–94)
- Death's Head II #12–15 (Marvel UK, 1993–94)
- Flash #95–98 (full art); #99–100 (along with Carlos Pacheco) (DC, 1994–95)
- Speed Demon (Amalgam Comics, Marvel/DC, 1996)
- Stormwatch #18 (Image, 1995)
