= The Dark Tower: The Drawing of the Three - The Sailor =

Comic Book Series

- Cover of The Dark Tower: The Drawing of the Three - The Sailor #1 (Oct., 2016)

Publication information
- Publisher: Marvel Comics
- Schedule: "Monthly"
- Format: Limited series
- Publication date: Oct., 2016 - Feb., 2017
- No. of issues: 5

Creative team
- Created by: Stephen King
- Written by: Robin Furth (adaptation); Peter David (script)
- Artist(s): Juanan Ramirez, Cory Hamscher, Jesus Aburtov, Federico Blee, Jay Anacleto, Romulo Fajardo Jr.

The Dark Tower: The Drawing of the Three - The Sailor is a five-issue comic book limited series published by Marvel Comics. It is the fifteenth comic book miniseries based on Stephen King's The Dark Tower series of novels. It is plotted by Robin Furth, scripted by Peter David, and illustrated by Juanan Ramirez with Cory Hamscher and Jesus Aburtov with Federico Blee, with covers by Jay Anacleto and Romulo Fajardo Jr. Stephen King is the Creative and Executive Director of the project. The first issue was published on October 12, 2016.

Preceded by
The Dark Tower: The Drawing of the Three - Bitter Medicine

== Publication dates ==
- Issue #1: October 12, 2016
- Issue #2: November 9, 2016
- Issue #3: December 14, 2016
- Issue #4: January 11, 2017
- Issue #5: February 8, 2017

== Collected editions ==
The entire five-issue run of The Sailor was collected into a paperback edition, released by Marvel on May 9, 2017 (ISBN 0785192840).

== See also ==
- The Dark Tower (comics)
