= Ultimate Elektra =

Comic series

- Cover to Ultimate Elektra #1. Art by Salvador Larroca.

Publication information
- Publisher: Marvel Comics
- Schedule: Monthly
- Format: Limited series
- Publication date: August - December 2004
- No. of issues: 5
- Main character(s): Elektra Natchios; Matt Murdock; Foggy Nelson; Benjamin Poindexter

Creative team
- Written by: Mike Carey
- Artist: Salvador Larroca

Collected editions
- Devil's Due: ISBN 978-0-7851-1504-5

Ultimate Elektra is a five-issue comic book limited series, which serves as a follow-up to Ultimate Daredevil and Elektra. Both were published by Marvel Comics under the Ultimate Marvel imprint. Devil's Due is written by Mike Carey, with pencils by Salvador Larroca.

== Plot summary ==
The mini-series begins shortly after its predecessor, with Matt Murdock and Elektra Natchios in their freshman year at Columbia University.

Elektra can only stand by as her father makes a deal with his cousins, Paul and Leonder, who are in organized crime, so that he can rebuild the family's laundromat. Paul and Leonder hope to launder the money earned from their criminal life, but their book keeper Kenneth Cullen has turned state's evidence. Elektra Natchios makes a bargain with her cousins, she will recover the evidence in return for her father's financial freedom. She fakes being a call girl so that she can recover the evidence, just in time to see Kenneth Cullen killed by Benjamin Poindexter (Bullseye), who was sent by the Kingpin.

== Reception ==
The first issue of Ultimate Elektra was ranked 16 in the August 2004 period with pre-order sales of 68,340. This was lower than its prequel with Ultimate Daredevil and Elektra's first issues sale of 77,050. The final issue #5 dropped in ranking to 35 with pre-order sales of 40,856.

Zeb Aslam from comixfan.com rated the series 3.5 out of 5. The writing is considered "pretty lackluster and average at best" and that the writer Carey is using an "accepted formula" without taking any risks. The artwork was praised however "in some panels the figures appear distorted".

== List of issues ==
1. Carey, M. (w), Larroca, S. (p), Crimelab Studios (i), Liquid's Aron Lusen (col), Eliopoulos, C. (let), Macchio, R. (ed). "Devil's Due: Part 1" Ultimate Elektra, no. 1 (August, 2004). Marvel Comics.
2. Carey, M. (w), Larroca, S. (p), Crimelab Studios (i), Liquid's Aron Lusen (col), Eliopoulos, C. (let), Macchio, R. (ed). "Devil's Due: Part 2" Ultimate Elektra, no. 2 (September, 2004). Marvel Comics.
3. Carey, M. (w), Larroca, S. (p), Crimelab Studios (i), Liquid's Aron Lusen (col), Eliopoulos, C. (let), Macchio, R. (ed). "Devil's Due: Part 3" Ultimate Elektra, no. 3 (October, 2004). Marvel Comics.
4. Carey, M. (w), Larroca, S. (p), Crimelab Studios (i), Liquid's Aron Lusen (col), Eliopoulos, C. (let), Macchio, R. (ed). "Devil's Due: Part 4" Ultimate Elektra, no. 4 (November, 2004). Marvel Comics.
5. Carey, M. (w), Larroca, S. (p), Crimelab Studios (i), Liquid's Aron Lusen (col), Eliopoulos, C. (let), Macchio, R. (ed). "Devil's Due: Part 5" Ultimate Elektra, no. 5 (December, 2004). Marvel Comics.

== Collected editions ==
Ultimate Elektra Volume 1: Devil's Due	(ISBN 978-0785115045)	released 19 January 2005 collected all 5 issues

== See also ==
- Elektra
- Daredevil
- Ultimate Daredevil and Elektra
