= Charlie the Choo-Choo =

Book by Stephen King

- First edition cover
- Author: Stephen King (as Beryl Evans)
- Illustrator: Ned Dameron
- Cover artist: Ned Dameron
- Language: English
- Series: The Dark Tower
- Genre: Children's fiction
- Publisher: Simon & Schuster Books for Young Readers
- Publication date: November 11, 2016
- Publication place: United States
- Media type: Print (Hardcover)
- Pages: 24
- ISBN: 978-1534401235

Charlie the Choo-Choo: From the World of The Dark Tower is a "children's book" by Stephen King, published under the pseudonym Beryl Evans. The story was written by Stephen King and published in King's previous novel The Dark Tower III: The Waste Lands. The story is intended to be creepy and give children nightmares. It was published by Simon & Schuster Books for Young Readers on November 11, 2016.

== Plot ==
Bob, an engineer for The Mid-World Railway Company, and a sentient locomotive named Charlie, make regular trips between St. Louis and Topeka. When Mr. Martin, the President of the Mid-World Railway Company, orders a new diesel locomotive to replace Charlie, the sentient locomotive is abandoned in a rail yard. Years later, when the diesel locomotive fails to start for Mr. Martin, who needs it to get to his daughter's piano recital in Topeka, Engineer Bob suggests using Charlie instead. The decision proves successful, and Mr. Martin later gets Charlie and Engineer Bob a gig pulling children in railroad cars around an amusement park.

== Background ==
The book was first revealed at San Diego Comic-Con, where a limited edition of 150 copies were given to attendees. Actress Allison Davies participated in a book signing at the event, portraying the fictional author Beryl Evans.

== In Media ==
- The book appears in the first episode of the Apple TV+ miniseries Lisey's Story (2021).
