= Ultimate Impact: Reborn =

Marvel Comics limited series

Publication information
- Publisher: Marvel Comics
- Format: Limited series
- Genre: Superhero
- Publication date: May 2026 – September 2026
- No. of issues: 5
- Main character(s): Miles Morales; Captain America; Iron Man; Hostilicus

Creative team
- Written by: Chris Condon
- Penciller: Stefano Caselli
- Inker: Stefano Caselli
- Letterer: Joe Sabino
- Colorist(s): Marte Garcia; David Curiel
- Editor: Tom Groneman

Ultimate Impact: Reborn is a 2026 limited series by Marvel Comics. It was created by Chris Condon and Stefano Caselli. The series is a sequel to "Ultimate Spider-Man: Incursion", where Miles Morales was entrusted with the Origin Boxes - items that were intended to endow superpowers and recreate the heroes whose histories were altered by the Maker. Following a battle with the villain Spot, the Origin Boxes are lost and fall into the possession of civilians.

== Publication history ==
It was announced that Chris Condon and Stefano Caselli would be working on a follow-up to the Ultimate Universe called Ultimate Impact: Reborn.

== Plot ==
In Earth-6160's Negative Zone, Hostilicus leads Annihilus' followers in cleansing it. On Earth-616, Miles Morales is transporting the Origin Boxes to Iron Man when he is ambushed by Spot. As Miles and Spot fight, a combination of Miles' sword and Spot's powers causes the Origin Boxes to be lost and reach civilians Vin Lerner, Paulina, Max, Lola, and Orson Boothe.

Miles swings around looking for the scattered Origin Boxes. In Staten Island, Punisher takes down a human trafficking operation. In Central Park, Max and Lola harness the Nega Bands, whose energy is detected by Hostilicus. As Punisher flees the police, he comes across two police officers being attacked. Orson Boothe is told about what happened to Paulina and is shown a video of Punisher fighting Hostilicus, who is unphased by his weapons. Boothe arrives and offers Hostilicus a deal.

Max and Lola are held prisoner in Earth-6160's Negative Zone. In Jersey City, Vin discovers his abilities when he breaks the door to the town house. Paulina experiences the effects of her Orb of Agamotto. At the East River, Iron Man catches an imposter as Miles arrives and informs him of what happened. Boothe is shown footage of Hostilicus breaking into a Stark Industries vault. Hostilicus is contacted by Boothe, who thanks him for the heist.

In Midtown, Manhattan, Paulina's new abilities enable her to save a passerby from a fallen construction beam. In Jersey City, Vin Lerner repairs the door and is dubbed the Jersey City Wonder Man. Arriving at work, Paulina learns that Boothe is contacting Hostilicus, who confronts Captain America. After fighting Captain America, Hostilicus activates a Helicarrier as he plans to return to the Negative Zone. This is witnessed online by Vin, Iron Man, Miles Morales, and Punisher. Paulina advises everyone in Boothe Media to evacuate.

Max and Lola struggle against Hostilicus' followers in Earth-6160's Negative Zone, as Vin works to master his powers. At Boothe Media Offices, Boothe nearly forces Paulina to commit suicide, but she is saved by her powers. Paula helps to close the portal to Earth-616's Negative Zone. Once Miles gets the Nega-Bands off of Hostilicus, he disappears and Max and Lola reappear. Later that night, Miles swings across the city, Vin checks in on his daughter, Paulina masters her abilities, Max and Lola are dating, and Boothe continues to plot.

== Characters ==
- Miles Morales
- Captain America
- Iron Man
- Hostilicus - A warrior from Earth-6160's Negative Zone who wields the Nega-Bands he claimed from Quasar.

=== Origin Box recipients ===
- Vin Lerner - A New Jersey dock worker who obtained Earth-6160's ionic infusor, giving him the powers of Wonder Man.
- Orson Boothe - The head of Boothe Media. Boothe obtained Earth-6160's Gem of Cyttorak, giving him mind-controlling abilities. In solicitations for the series, Boothe is referred to as Mogul.
- Paulina - A worker at Boothe Media. Paulina obtained Earth-6160's Eye of Agamotto, giving her powers similar to Doctor Strange. In solicitations for the series, Paulina is referred to as Sightseer.
- Max and Lola - Two people who came in contact with Earth-6160's Nega-Bands, summoning Hostilicus to Earth-616.
