= The Dark Tower: Fall of Gilead =

- Cover of The Dark Tower: Fall of Gilead #1 (May, 2009)

Publication information
- Publisher: Marvel Comics
- Schedule: "Monthly"
- Format: Limited series
- Publication date: May - Nov., 2009
- No. of issues: 6

Creative team
- Created by: Stephen King
- Written by: Robin Furth (adaptation); Peter David (script)
- Artist(s): Richard Isanove, Dean White, Jae Lee

The Dark Tower: Fall of Gilead is a six-issue comic book limited series published by Marvel Comics. It is the fourth comic book miniseries based on Stephen King's The Dark Tower series of novels. It is plotted by Robin Furth, scripted by Peter David, and illustrated by Richard Isanove and Dean White, with additional cover art by Jae Lee. Stephen King is the Creative and executive director of the project. The first issue was published on May 13, 2009.

Preceded by	Followed by
The Dark Tower: The Sorcerer	The Dark Tower: Battle of Jericho Hill

== Publication dates ==
- Issue #1: May 13, 2009
- Issue #2: June 17, 2009
- Issue #3: July 29, 2009
- Issue #4: August 26, 2009
- Issue #5: September 30, 2009
- Issue #6: November 25, 2009

== Plot ==
In direct continuation of the previous story's finale, Roland Deschain, is overcome with grief over accidentally killing his mother, Gabrielle. Abel Vannay the Wise and Cortland "Cort" Andrus search the quarters of Kingson, John Farson's nephew, whom Cort recently killed at the feast's riddle competition when he realized he was in league of Farson. Cort discovers a journal, but as he leafs through it, licking his fingers to do so, he picks up the poison with which the journal's pages are laced, much to Abel's horror. Steven Deschain discovers that Maerlyn's Grapefruit, the mysterious seeing sphere of John Farson's that Roland acquired during his recent mission, is missing from the cabinet where he hid it, and suspects that his wife, Gabrielle, secretly took the cabinet's key off of him as they danced at the recent feast, but is horrified when he discovers his son Roland over Gabrielle's dead body. Roland admits that he killed his own mother while under the spell of Maerlyn's Grapefruit which made her appear as Rhea of the Coos. Upon checking Gabrielle's body, the group discovers a poisoned blade with the sigul of John Farson, confirming that Gabrielle was coerced by Marten to assassinate Steven Deschain. Despite this, Roland is locked away in a cell to await trial for the murder of Gabrielle.

While Roland awaits trial, Steven Deschain and a group of gunslingers follow a trail leading from Gilead that they believe will lead them to John Farson. They are ambushed by a group of Slow Mutants and Robert Allgood (Cuthbert's Father) is killed with a poisonous dart. Later, they are ambushed again by Farson's men and all are killed except Steven Deschain and Chris Johns (Alain's Father) Cort also passes away from the effects of the poison ink, and Vannay is shot by a messenger as he prepares Cort's body for burial. Aileen, Cort's niece, enraged by the murder of her uncle, disguises herself as a boy and a gunslinger and helps Roland escape from his cell, only to discover that all of his gunslinger mentors have been slain, and that his father is injured badly from the ambush. Upon returning it is soon discovered that the doctors in Gilead have been killed by Farson's men in preparation for the upcoming assault on Gilead. Chris Johns throat is slit as he checks on the home of Doctor Decurry, and Steven is stabbed in the back by a traitorous guard. With his last breath, Steven scrawls "Open the Pits" in his own blood on the floor, a signal to Roland to use the castle's ancient defenses, only to be used in the most dire circumstances. Three days later, John Farson's army arrives at the gates of Gilead and a battle ensues. Despite the ancient pits, John Farson's troops, slow mutants, and great machines of the old times (tanks, RPGs) are too much for the city, and the citizens are forced to flee in the sewer.

== Collected editions ==
Along with the single-issue release of The Dark Tower: The Sorcerer, the entire six-issue run of Fall of Gilead was included in a collected hardcover edition also entitled The Dark Tower: Fall of Gilead and released by Marvel on February 23, 2010 (ISBN 0785129510). A paperback edition was later released on November 2, 2011 (ISBN 0785129529). The series was also included in the hardcover release of The Dark Tower Omnibus on September 21, 2011 (ISBN 0785155414).

On September 25, 2018, Gallery 13 republished the original hardcover collection as Stephen King's The Dark Tower: Beginnings - The Fall of Gilead (Book 4) (ISBN 1982108274). On October 23, 2018, this edition (along with Books 1-3 and 5) was included in the boxed set Stephen King's The Dark Tower: Beginnings - The Complete Graphic Novel Series (ISBN 1982110201).

== See also ==
- The Dark Tower (comics)
