= Ultimate Daredevil and Elektra =

Comic book mini-series by Greg Rucka and Salvador Larroca

- Cover to Ultimate Daredevil & Elektra #1. Art by Salvador Larroca.

Publication information
- Publisher: Marvel Comics
- Schedule: Monthly
- Format: Limited series
- Publication date: Oct. 2002–Feb. 2003
- No. of issues: 4
- Main character(s): Matt Murdock; Elektra Natchios; Phoebe McAllister; Melissa Beckerman; Trey Langstrom

Creative team
- Written by: Greg Rucka
- Artist: Salvador Larroca

Collected editions
- Ultimate Daredevil and Elektra: ISBN 978-0-7851-1076-7

Ultimate Daredevil and Elektra is a four-issue comic book mini-series published by Marvel Comics written by Greg Rucka with art by Salvador Larroca. Marvel characters Daredevil and Elektra are introduced to the Ultimate universe in the series in October 2002. A sequel to the series called Ultimate Elektra was released in August 2004.

== Plot ==
In this story, Matt Murdock and Elektra Natchios are both students in Columbia University, where they meet and start dating. Murdock is blind and studying law. During the course of the story, Elektra and her roommates are harassed by a rich boy, Trey Langstrom, until Elektra, a martial artist fights back. In response, Langstrom and a group of thugs destroys Elektra's father's business. Murdock, also a martial artist and possessor of enhanced senses (which compensate for his blindness), forces the thugs to confess, but couldn't stop Elektra from seriously wounding Langstrom. While Matt reveals his identity to Elektra, she forces him to choose between their love and his sense of duty. He chooses the second and they apparently part ways.

== Reception ==
The first issue Ultimate Daredevil and Elektra was ranked 13 with pre-order sales of 77,050. Ultimate Daredevil and Elektra #2 was ranked 13 in the top 300 comics for the December 2002 period with pre-order sales of 67,761 while issue 3 was ranked 14 with pre-order sales of 66,360. The final issue was ranked 12 in the January 2003 period with pre-order sales of 66,107.

== Issues ==
1. Rucka, G. (w), Larroca, S. (p), Miki, D. (i), A. Hou, J. Ang, A. Tsang (col), Eliopoulos, C. (let), Lee, J. (ed). "Part 1 of 4" Ultimate Daredevil & Elektra, no. 1 (January, 2003). Marvel Comics.
2. Rucka, G. (w), Larroca, S. (p), Miki, D. (i), A. Hou, J. Ang, A. Tsang (col), Eliopoulos, C. (let), Lee, J. (ed). "Part 2 of 4" Ultimate Daredevil & Elektra, no. 2 (February, 2003). Marvel Comics.
3. Rucka, G. (w), Larroca, S. (p), Miki, D. (i), A. Hou, J. Ang, A. Tsang (col), Eliopoulos, C. (let), Lee, J. (ed). "Part 3 of 4" Ultimate Daredevil & Elektra, no. 3 (March, 2003). Marvel Comics.
4. Rucka, G. (w), Larroca, S. (p), Miki, D. (i), A. Hou, J. Ang, A. Tsang (col), Eliopoulos, C. (let), Lee, J. (ed). "Part 4 of 4" Ultimate Daredevil & Elektra, no. 4 (April, 2003). Marvel Comics.

== Collected editions ==
The series has been collected into a trade paperback:

- Ultimate Daredevil and Elektra (February 2003, ISBN 978-0-7851-1076-7)

== See also ==
- Elektra
- Daredevil
- Ultimate Elektra
