= Nimit Malavia =

Nimit Malavia is a freelance illustrator from Ottawa, Ontario. He graduated from Sheridan College with a degree in Illustration and has produced art for Marvel Comics, Shopify, 20th Century Fox and National Post. His works have appeared in galleries all over the world, including Toronto, San Francisco, Berlin, and London.

== Career ==
Malavia's art has been featured on the covers of a number of comic series and graphic novels, including 4 issues of Wolverine and Jubilee, (Marvel Comics), issue #4 of Kill Shakespeare (IDW Publishing) and the third book in the graphic novel trilogy Vitalis Chronicles. In 2013, he was hired at Vertigo Comics as the cover artist for the Fables series starting with issue #139. It is expected he will continue in this role until the series's finale in issue #150.

Malavia created several promotional posters for the 2012 New York Comic Con which previewed the release of Abraham Lincoln: Vampire Hunter on Blu-ray and DVD. Included in the film's special features was the animated short The Great Calamity, for which he was hired as Key Concept Artist.
