= The Dark Tower (series) =

Series by Stephen King

- "The Dark Tower" painting by Michael Whelan
- The Gunslinger (1982); The Drawing of the Three (1987); The Waste Lands (1991); Wizard and Glass (1997); The Little Sisters of Eluria (1998); Wolves of the Calla (2003); Song of Susannah (2004); The Dark Tower (2004); The Wind Through the Keyhole (2012)
- Author: Stephen King
- Illustrator: Michael Whelan, Phil Hale, Ned Dameron, Dave McKean, Jae Lee, Bernie Wrightson, Darrel Anderson
- Country: United States
- Language: English
- Genre: Dark fantasy, science fiction, horror, Western

The Dark Tower is a series of eight novels, one novella, and a children's book written by American author Stephen King. Incorporating themes from multiple genres, including dark fantasy, science fantasy, horror, and Western, it describes a "gunslinger" and his quest toward a tower, the nature of which is both physical and metaphorical. The series, and its use of the Dark Tower, expands upon Stephen King's multiverse and in doing so, links together many of his other novels.

The eight novels of the series proper comprise 4,250 pages. Many of King's other books relate to the story, introducing concepts and characters that come into play as the series progresses.

The series was chiefly inspired by the poem "Childe Roland to the Dark Tower Came" by Robert Browning, the full text of which was included in the final volume's appendix. In the preface to the revised 2003 edition of The Gunslinger, King also identifies The Lord of the Rings, Arthurian legend, and The Good, the Bad and the Ugly as inspirations. He identifies Clint Eastwood's "Man with No Name" character as one of the major inspirations for the protagonist, Roland Deschain. King's style of location names in the series, such as Mid-World, and his development of a unique language (High Speech), are also influenced by J. R. R. Tolkien's work.

The novel series was film adapted in 2017.

== Overview ==
=== Plot summary ===
In the story, Roland Deschain is a member of a knightly order known as gunslingers and the last of the line of "Arthur Eld", his world's analogue of King Arthur. Politically organized along the lines of a feudal society, it shares technological and social characteristics with the American Old West but is also magical. Many of the magical aspects have vanished from Mid-World but traces remain, as do relics from a technologically advanced society. Roland's quest is to find the Dark Tower, a fabled building said to be the nexus of all universes. Roland's world is said to have "moved on", and it appears to be coming apart at the seams. Mighty nations have been torn apart by war, entire cities and regions vanish without a trace and time does not flow in an orderly fashion. Sometimes, even the sun rises in the north and sets in the east. As the series opens, Roland's motives, goals, and age are unclear, although later installments shed light on these mysteries.

For a detailed synopsis of the novels, see the relevant article for each book.

==== Connections to King's other works ====
The series has become a linchpin that is interwoven with, and ties together, much of King's body of work. The worlds of The Dark Tower are in part composed of locations, characters, events and other various elements from many of King's novels and short stories. Some of the principal books that are tied to this series, or that this series references, include It, The Stand, 'Salem's Lot, Insomnia, Hearts in Atlantis, Black House, The Eyes of the Dragon, The Shining, and Cell. The TV miniseries Kingdom Hospital takes place in a world in which Nozz-A-La is the most popular beverage in the world, possibly meaning those events take place in the same universe as books 4 and 5 are set.

=== Characters ===
Along his journey to the Dark Tower, Roland meets a great number of friends and enemies. For most of the way, he is accompanied by a group of people who, together with him, form the Ka-tet of the Nineteen and Ninety-nine, consisting of Jake Chambers, Eddie Dean, Susannah Dean, and Oy. Among his many enemies on the way are The Man in Black, Mordred, and The Crimson King.

=== Language ===
King created a language for his characters, known as the High Speech. Examples of this language include the phrases Thankee, Sai ("Thank you, Sir/Ma'am.") and Dan-Tete ("Little Savior"). In addition, King uses the term Ka, which is the approximate equivalent of destiny, or fate, in the fictional language High Speech (and similarly, Ka-tet, a group of people bound together by fate/destiny). This term originated in Egyptian mythology and storytelling, and has figured in several other novels and screenplays since 1976. The term also appears in King's short story "Low Men in Yellow Coats", in which Ted describes its meaning to Bobby.

== Main series ==
#	Title	Subtitle(s)	Pages	Words	Release	Awards
0.5	The Little Sisters of Eluria		66	23,434	1998	
1	The Dark Tower: The Gunslinger	Resumption	224	55,376	1982	
2	The Dark Tower II: The Drawing of the Three	Renewal	400	125,948	1987	
3	The Dark Tower III: The Waste Lands	Redemption	512	173,489	1991	
4	The Dark Tower IV: Wizard and Glass	Regard	787	254,691	1997	1998 Locus Award nominee
4.5	The Dark Tower: The Wind Through the Keyhole		336	91,857	2012	
5	The Dark Tower V: Wolves of the Calla	Resistance	714	242,776	2003	2004 Locus Award nominee
6	The Dark Tower VI: Song of Susannah	Reproduction	432	118,221	2004	2005 Locus Award nominee
7	The Dark Tower VII: The Dark Tower	Revelation, Reproduction, Redemption, and Resumption	845	272,273	2004	2005 British Fantasy Award winner
	Total		4,316	1,358,065		

=== Continuation ===
While the series was declared finished with the publication of the seventh volume in 2004, Stephen King described in an interview in March 2009 an idea for a new short story he'd recently had: "And then I thought, 'Well, why don't I find three more like this and do a book that would be almost like modern fairy tales?' Then this thing started to add on bits and pieces so I guess it will be a novel." According to King, the idea was a new Dark Tower novel.

King said, regarding The Dark Tower, "It's not really done yet. Those seven books are really sections of one long über-novel." King confirmed this during his TimesTalk event at The Times Center in New York City on November 10, 2009, and the next day King's official site posted that King would begin working on this novel in about eight months, with a tentative title being The Wind Through the Keyhole. King noted that this novel would likely be set between the fourth and the fifth books of the series. The book, titled The Dark Tower: The Wind Through the Keyhole, was announced on Stephen King's official site on March 10, 2011, and was published on April 24, 2012.

=== Illustrations ===
Each book in the series was originally published in hardcover format with a number of full-color illustrations spread throughout. Each book contained works by a single illustrator only. Subsequent printings of each book in trade paperback format usually preserve the illustrations in full, except for books I and IV. Pocket-sized paperback reprints contain only black-and-white chapter or section header illustrations.

The illustrators who worked on each book are:

#	Illustrator	Title	Comments
0.5	Erik Wilson	"The Little Sisters of Eluria"	Wilson created the cover art for the short story when originally published in the anthology Legends.
1	Michael Whelan	The Dark Tower: The Gunslinger	The Dark Tower is among his early notable works.
2	Phil Hale	The Dark Tower II: The Drawing of the Three	The only Dark Tower illustrator who created a second set of illustrations for a later printing of the book he illustrated.
3	Ned Dameron	The Dark Tower III: The Waste Lands	Also illustrated the children's book Charlie the Choo-Choo, published 25 years after its original manifestation in The Waste Lands.
4	Dave McKean	The Dark Tower IV: Wizard and Glass	The only Dark Tower illustrator to work in photocollages.
4.5	Jae Lee	The Dark Tower: The Wind Through the Keyhole	Also collaborated on the art for four story arcs of The Dark Tower, the comic book series published by Marvel Comics.
5	Bernie Wrightson	The Dark Tower V: Wolves of the Calla	Illustrator for 1960s and 1970s horror comics; he also provided the illustrations for King's novella Cycle of the Werewolf.
6	Darrel Anderson	The Dark Tower VI: Song of Susannah	The only Dark Tower illustrator who used digital illustration techniques.
7	Michael Whelan	The Dark Tower VII: The Dark Tower	Returning more than 20 years later as the only recurring Dark Tower illustrator.

== Reception ==
Bill Sheehan of The Washington Post called the series "a humane, visionary epic and a true magnum opus" that stands as an "imposing example of pure storytelling," "filled with brilliantly rendered set pieces... cataclysmic encounters and moments of desolating tragedy." Erica Noonan of the Boston Globe said, "There's a fascinating world to be discovered in the series" but noted that its epic nature keeps it from being user-friendly. Allen Johnston of The New York Times was disappointed with how the series progressed; while he marveled at the "sheer absurdity of [the books'] existence" and complimented King's writing style, he said preparation would have improved the series, stating "King doesn't have the writerly finesse for these sorts of games, and the voices let him down." Michael Berry of the San Francisco Chronicle, however, called the series' early installments "highfalutin hodgepodge" but the ending "a valediction" that "more than delivers on what has been promised." Joshua Rothman of The New Yorker praised the series, feeling that "the novels were better and weirder than [he'd] hoped." Because it features several of his classic tropes, Rothman claimed, "If you really like Stephen King, you owe it to yourself to give the series a shot."

== Other media ==
=== Tie-in books ===
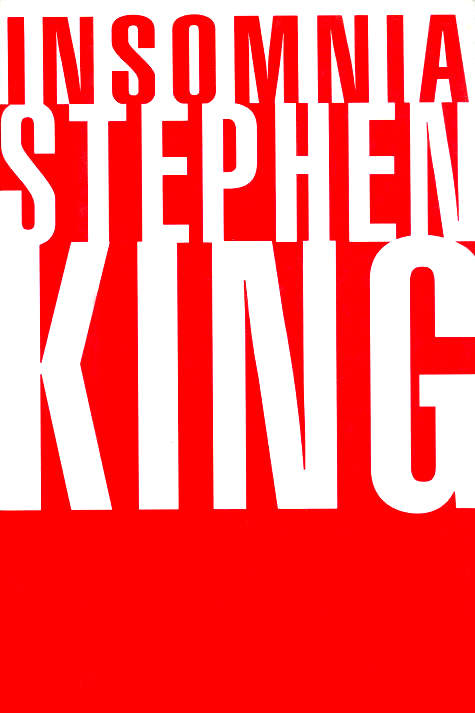
King's 1994 novel Insomnia has strong connections to The Dark Tower.

The series has prompted related non-fiction books by authors besides King. Robin Furth has published the two-volume Stephen King's The Dark Tower: A Concordance, an encyclopedia-style companion to the series that she originally wrote for King's personal use. Bev Vincent has published The Road to The Dark Tower: Exploring Stephen King's Magnum Opus, a book containing back story, summary and analysis and The Dark Tower Companion, which includes interviews and coverage of the Marvel graphic novels. Stephen King has endorsed these books.

Charlie the Choo-Choo is a "children's book" by Stephen King released in 2016, published under the pseudonym Beryl Evans. It is adapted from a section of King's previous novel The Dark Tower III: The Waste Lands. It was illustrated by Ned Dameron.

=== Comics ===
Several Dark Tower series arcs were published by Marvel Comics.

A prequel, The Dark Tower: The Gunslinger Born is plotted by Robin Furth, scripted by Peter David, and illustrated by Jae Lee and Richard Isanove, and is set around the time of the flashbacks in The Gunslinger and Wizard and Glass. The first issue of this first arc was released on February 7, 2007. A hardcover volume containing all seven issues was released on November 7, 2007.

The second arc in the series, The Long Road Home, began publication on March 5, 2008. A hardcover volume containing all five issues was released on October 1, 2008.

The third arc, The Dark Tower: Treachery, began publication on September 10, 2008; this coincides with the release of The Stand comic series, another collaboration between King and Marvel. A hardcover volume containing all six issues was released on April 22, 2009.

Following the completion of the third arc a one-shot issue titled The Dark Tower: Sorcerer was released April 15, 2009. The story focuses on the history of the villainous wizard Marten Broadcloak.

The fourth arc, The Dark Tower: Fall of Gilead, began publication on May 13, 2009. A hardcover volume containing all 6 issues was released in February 2010.

The fifth arc, The Dark Tower: Battle of Jericho Hill, began publication on December 3, 2009. A hardcover volume containing all 5 issues was released on August 2010.

Marvel Comics has also published three supplemental books to date that expand upon characters and locations first introduced in the novels. The Dark Tower: Gunslingers' Guidebook was released in August 2007, The Dark Tower: End-World Almanac was released in July 2008, and The Dark Tower: Guide to Gilead was released in February 2009. All three books were written by Anthony Flamini, with Furth serving as creative consultant. End-World Almanac and Guide to Gilead feature illustrations by David Yardin.

A five-issue adaptation of King's novel The Dark Tower: The Gunslinger, titled The Dark Tower: The Gunslinger - The Journey Begins, began publication on May 19, 2010. The collected hardback edition was released in January 2011.

An adaptation of King's novella "The Little Sisters of Eluria", titled The Dark Tower: The Gunslinger - The Little Sisters of Eluria, began publication on December 8, 2010. The collected hardback edition was released on June 8, 2011.

A second adaptation of King's novel The Dark Tower: The Gunslinger, titled The Dark Tower: The Gunslinger - The Battle of Tull, began publication on June 1, 2011. The collected hardback edition was released on January 11, 2012.

A third adaptation of King's novel The Dark Tower: The Gunslinger, titled The Dark Tower: The Gunslinger - The Way Station, began publication on December 14, 2011. The collected hardback edition was released on June 13, 2012.

=== Games ===
December 7, 2009 saw the release of a spin-off online game titled Discordia, available to play free of charge on the official Stephen King website. The game is a continuation of the original Dark Tower story, following the war between the Tet Corporation and Sombra/NCP in New York, and it has been supervised by both Stephen King and Robin Furth. From the website: "Exploring the behind-the-scenes conflict between the two companies, Discordia introduces long-time Dark Tower fans to new characters and numerous mechanical/magical items developed by Mid-World's Old Ones. Over the course of our adventure we will visit many locations, both those familiar to Dark Tower fans and others which we only glimpsed in the Dark Tower novels. While we may not see Roland and his ka-tet in this adventure, the development team has remembered the faces of its fathers. We have done our best to honor the original Dark Tower series while simultaneously mapping new and exciting Dark Tower territory."

=== Film ===
Sony Pictures and Media Rights Capital adapted the series for film. The film is directed by Nikolaj Arcel, and stars Idris Elba and Matthew McConaughey, cast respectively as Roland Deschain and Walter O'Dim. The film was released on August 4, 2017. Critics panned the film with it receiving a score of 16% on Rotten Tomatoes. The film combines elements from several novels in The Dark Tower series, serving as a canonical sequel to the novel series. Stephen King has indicated that The Dark Tower film and television series will follow Roland's "last time round" to the titular Dark Tower. In July 2016, director Nikolaj Arcel confirmed that The Dark Tower film would be a sequel to the novels as well as a direct adaptation, with Roland in the next cycle of his journey to the Tower.

In a 2017 interview with Collider, Stephen King expressed hope for a sequel film in addition to the upcoming television series, suggesting that it should be R-rated, with Roland wearing a hat, and that it would include the "lobstrosities" from The Drawing of the Three. In an interview with ComingSoon.net, Nikolaj Arcel confirmed that The Drawing of the Three would form the basis for the sequel, and that yet-to-be-cast actors who will play Eddie and Susannah Dean would appear alongside Elba, McConaughey, Taylor, and Haley reprising their roles as Roland, Walter, Jake and Sayre respectively.

=== Television ===
In February 2018, Amazon bought the rights to The Dark Tower books for a series adaptation, though it was not made clear at first if anyone from the film would be involved. It was later confirmed that the series would serve as a reboot, with Sam Strike and Jasper Pääkkönen being cast as Roland Deschain and The Man in Black, respectively. In June 2019, Michael Rooker, Jerome Flynn and Joana Ribeiro were also believed to be cast members. In January 2020, Amazon decided not to move forward with the pilot, but production company MRC is shopping the pilot scripts elsewhere.

In December 2022, director Mike Flanagan announced that he had acquired the rights to develop a television series based on the books and has plans for a multi-season release.

=== Audiobooks ===
Currently there exist five audio versions of The Dark Tower series – in English, Polish, German, French and Russian. The audio book in English published by Hodder & Stoughton features voices of George Guidall and Frank Muller and has neither music nor sound effects. The audio book in German published by Deutschland Random House Audio introduces Vittorio Alfieri and David Nathan as the narrators. The French audiobooks are published by Éditions Gallimard and narrated by Jacques Frantz. In Russian, The Gunslinger, as narrated by Igor Knyazev, does not have any music or sound effects

The first two novels in the series, The Dark Tower: The Gunslinger and The Dark Tower II: The Drawing of the Three, were produced on audio cassette by New Audio Library (NAL) in 1988 and 1989 respectively. The Waste Lands, The Dark Tower Part III, was produced on audio cassette by Penguin Highbridge Audio in 1991. Each of these early editions was narrated by the author. The Waste Lands includes musical accompaniment throughout.

All of these editions were subsequently re-recorded in 1997 with Frank Muller as the narrator for continuity. Muller narrates the fourth book in the series, The Dark Tower IV: Wizard and Glass. Stephen King selected Muller as his voice for all audio narrations at this time. Frank Muller suffered a catastrophic brain injury in a motorcycle accident in 2001. The narration task then fell to George Guidall, who recorded the final three books in the series in quick succession in 2003 and 2004. George Guidall was also called upon to re-record The Dark Tower: The Gunslinger, the first book in the series, in 2003, as the author made significant changes to that story to better match what came later.
