= List of Marvel Comics publications (M) =

Marvel Comics is an American comic book company dating to 1961. This is a list of the publications it has released in its history under the "Marvel Comics" imprint. The list does not include collected editions; trade paperbacks; digital comics; free, promotional giveaways; sketchbooks; poster books or magazines, nor does it include series published by other Marvel imprints such as Epic, Icon or Star. It also does not include titles published by Marvel's pre-1961 predecessors Timely Comics and Atlas Comics.

- List of Marvel Comics publications (A)
- List of Marvel Comics publications (B–C)
- List of Marvel Comics publications (D–E)
- List of Marvel Comics publications (F–G)
- List of Marvel Comics publications (H–L)
- List of Marvel Comics publications (N–R)
- List of Marvel Comics publications (S)
- List of Marvel Comics publications (T–V)
- List of Marvel Comics publications (W–Z)

== M ==
Title	Series	Issues	Dates	Notes	Reference
Machine Man	vol. 1	#1–19	Apr 1978 – Feb 1981		
Machine Man	vol. 2	#1–4	Oct 1984 – Jan 1985	limited series	
Machine Man/Bastion '98		#1	1998	Annual; one-shot	
Machine Man 2020		#1–2	Aug 1994 – Sep 1994	limited series	
Machine Teen		#1–5	Jul 2005 – Nov 2005	limited series	
Mad About Millie		#1–16	Apr 1969 – Nov 1970		
Mad About Millie		Annual #1	Nov 1971		
Mad-Dog		#1–6	May 1993 – Oct 1993	limited series	
Madrox		#1–5	Nov 2004 – Mar 2005	limited series	
Maestro		#1–5	Oct 2020 – Feb 2021	limited series	
Maestro	War and Pax	#1–5	Mar 2021 – Jul 2021	limited series	
Maestro	World War M	#1–5	Apr 2022 – Sep 2022	limited series	
Magdalena/Daredevil		#1	May 2008	one-shot; also known as The Magdalena/Daredevil; co-published with Top Cow Productions and Image Comics	
Magician: Apprentice		#3–12	Nov 2006 – Feb 2008	previous issues published by Dabel Brothers Productions	
Magik	vol. 1	#1–4	Dec 1983 – Mar 1984	limited series	
Magik	vol. 2	#1–4	Dec 2000 – Mar 2001	limited series; also known as X-Men: Magik	
Magik	vol. 3	#1–10	Mar 2025 – Nov 2025		
Magik & Colossus		#1–5	Apr 2026 – Aug 2026	limited series	
Magnetic Men Featuring Magneto		#1	Jun 1997	One-shot; published under the Amalgam Comics imprint in association with DC	
Magneto	vol. 1	#1–4	Nov 1996 – Feb 1997	limited series	
Magneto	vol. 2	#1	Mar 2011	one-shot	
Magneto	vol. 3	#1–21	May 2014 – Oct 2015		
Magneto	vol. 4	#1–4	Oct 2023 – Jan 2024	limited series	
Magneto	Ascendant	#1	Apr 1999	one-shot	
Magneto	Dark Seduction	#1–4	Jun 2000 – Sep 2000	limited series	
Magneto	Not a Hero	#1–4	Jan 2012 – Apr 2012	limited series	
Magneto	Rex	#1–3	Apr 1999 – Jul 1999	limited series	
Magneto and His Magnetic Men		#1	Apr 1996	One-shot; published under the Amalgam Comics imprint in association with DC; also known as Magneto and the Magnetic Men	
Magnificent Ms. Marvel		#1–18	May 2019 – Apr 2021		
Magnificent Ms. Marvel		Annual #1	Sep 2019		
Major X		#0–6	Jun 2019 – Oct 2019	limited series	
Man from Atlantis		#1–7	Feb 1978 – Aug 1978	based on TV series	
Man-Thing	vol. 1	#1–22	Jan 1974 – Oct 1975		
Man-Thing	vol. 1	Giant-Size #1–5	Aug 1974 – Aug 1975		
Man-Thing	vol. 2	#1–11	Nov 1979 – Jul 1981		
Man-Thing	vol. 3	#1–8	Dec 1997 – Jul 1998		
Man-Thing	vol. 4	#1–3	Sep 2004 – Nov 2004	limited series	
Man-Thing	vol. 5	#1–5	May 2017 – Aug 2017	limited series	
Man Without Fear		#1–5	Mar 2019	limited series	
Mandrake the Magician		#1–2	Apr 1995 – May 1995	limited series	
The Many Loves of the Amazing Spider-Man		#1	Jul 2010	one-shot	
Marauders	vol. 1	#1–27	Dec 2019 – Mar 2022		
Marauders	vol. 2	#1–12	Jun 2022 – May 2023		
Marauders	vol. 2	Annual #1	2022		
Marc Spector: Moon Knight	vol. 1	#1–60	Jun 1989 – Mar 1994		
Marc Spector: Moon Knight	vol. 1	Special #1	Oct 1992	also known as Moon Knight Special	
Marc Spector: Moon Knight	vol. 2	#1–	Apr 2026 – present		
Mark Hazzard: Merc		#1–12	Nov 1986 – Oct 1987		
Mark Hazzard: Merc		Annual #1	1987		
Marvel		#1–6	May 2020 – May 2021	limited series	
Marvel 75th Anniversary Celebration		#1	Oct 2014	one-shot	
Marvel 75th Anniversary Magazine			Sep 2014	one-shot	
Marvel 85th Anniversary Special		#1	Oct 2024	one-shot	
Marvel 1602		#1–8	Nov 2003 – Jun 2004	limited series	
Marvel 1602	Fantastick Four	#1–5	Nov 2006 – Mar 2007	limited series	
Marvel 1985		#1–6	Jul 2008 – Dec 2008	limited series	
Marvel 2-in-One		#1–12	Feb 2018 – Jan 2019		
Marvel 2-in-One		Annual #1	Aug 2018		
Marvel Action Hour	Featuring Iron Man	#1–8	Nov 1994 – Jun 1995		
Marvel Action Hour	Featuring the Fantastic Four	#1–8	Nov 1994 – Jun 1995		
Marvel Action Universe		#1	Jan 1989	one-shot	
Marvel Adventure		#1–6	Dec 1975 – Oct 1976		
Marvel Adventures (1997)		#1–18	Apr 1997 – Sep 1998		
Marvel Adventures (2005)	Fantastic Four	#0–48	Jul 2005 – Jul 2009		
Marvel Adventures (2005)	Hulk	#1–16	Sep 2007 – Dec 2008		
Marvel Adventures (2005)	Iron Man	#1–13	Jul 2007 – Jul 2008		
Marvel Adventures (2005)	Spider-Man vol. 1	#1–61	May 2005 – May 2010		
Marvel Adventures (2005)	Spider-Man vol. 2	#1–24	Jun 2010 – May 2012		
Marvel Adventures (2005)	Super Heroes vol. 1	#1–21	Sep 2008 – May 2010		
Marvel Adventures (2005)	Super Heroes vol. 2	#1–24	Jun 2010 – May 2012		
Marvel Adventures (2005)	The Avengers	#1–39	Jul 2006 – Oct 2009		
Marvel Adventures (2005)	The Avengers	Giant-Size #1	Sep 2007		
Marvel Adventures (2005)	Two-in-One	#1–21	Oct 2007 – Apr 2009		
Marvel Age (1983)		#1–140	Apr 1983 – Sep 1994		
Marvel Age (1983)		Annual #1–4	1985 – 1988		
Marvel Age (1983)		Preview #1–2	1990 – 1992		
Marvel Age (2004)	Fantastic Four	#1–12	Jun 2004 – Mar 2005		
Marvel Age (2004)	Fantastic Four Tales	#1	Apr 2005	one-shot	
Marvel Age (2004)	Hulk	#1–4	Nov 2004 – Feb 2005		
Marvel Age (2004)	Spider-Man	#1–20	May 2004 – Mar 2005		
Marvel Age (2004)	Spider-Man Team-Up	#1–5	Nov 2004 – Apr 2005		
Marvel Age (2023)		#1000	Oct 2023	one-shot	
Marvel All-On-One		#1	Oct 2025	one-shot	
Marvel & Disney: What If...?	Donald Duck Became Iron Man	#1	Jul 2025	one-shot	
Marvel & Disney: What If...?	Donald Duck Became Thor	#1	Nov 2024	one-shot	
Marvel & Disney: What If...?	Donald Duck Became Wolverine	#1	Sep 2024	one-shot	
Marvel & Disney: What If...?	Goofy Became Spider-Man	#1	Sep 2025	one-shot	
Marvel & Disney: What If...?	Mickey & Friends Became The Avengers	#1	May 2025	one-shot	
Marvel & Disney: What If...?	Mickey & Friends Became The Fantastic Four	#1	Mar 2025	one-shot	
Marvel & Disney: What If...?	Minnie Became Captain Marvel	#1	Jan 2025	one-shot	
Marvel Annual Report		#1–5	1991 – 1995	annuals	
Marvel Apes		#1–4; 0	Nov – Dec 2008 Feb 2009	limited series	
Marvel Apes	Amazing Spider-Monkey Special	#1	Jun 2009	one-shot	
Marvel Apes	Grunt Line Special	#1	Jul 2009	one-shot	
Marvel Apes	Speedball Special	#1	May 2009	one-shot	
Marvel Assistant-Sized Spectacular		#1–2	Jun 2009	limited series	
Marvel Atlas		#1–2	Jan 2008 – Mar 2008	limited series	
Marvel: Black, White & Blood and Guts		#1–4	Dec 2025 – Mar 2026	limited series	
Marvel Boy	vol. 1	#1–2	Dec 1950 – Feb 1951		
Marvel Boy	vol. 2	#1–6	Aug 2000 – Mar 2001	limited series	
Marvel Boy	The Uranian	#1–3	Mar 2010 – May 2010	limited series	
Marvel Chillers		#1–7	Oct 1975 – Oct 1976		
Marvel Classics Comics		#1–36	Jan 1976 – Dec 1978		
Marvel Collectors' Item Classics		#1–22	Feb 1966 – Aug 1969	continued as Marvel's Greatest Comics	
Marvel Comics		#1000–1001	Oct 2019 – Dec 2019	limited series	
Marvel Comics 70th Anniversary Celebration Magazine		#1	Apr 2009	one-shot	
Marvel Comics Presents	vol. 1	#1–175	Sep 1988 – Mar 1995		
Marvel Comics Presents	vol. 2	#1–12	Nov 2007 – Oct 2008		
Marvel Comics Presents	vol. 3	#1–9	Mar 2019 – Nov 2019		
Marvel Comics Super Special		#1–4	1977 – 1978	continued as Marvel Super Special	
Marvel/DC	Deadpool/Batman	#1	Nov 2025	one-shot; co-published with DC	
Marvel/DC	Spider-Man/Superman	#1	Jun 2026	one-shot; co-published with DC	
Marvel Divas		#1–4	Sep 2009 – Dec 2009	limited series	
Marvel Double Feature		#1–21	Dec 1973 – Apr 1977		
Marvel Double Shot		#1–4	Jan 2003 – Apr 2003	limited series	
Marvel Fanfare	vol. 1	#1–60	Mar 1982 – Dec 1991		
Marvel Fanfare	vol. 2	#1–6	Sep 1996 – Feb 1997		
Marvel Feature	vol. 1	#1–12	Dec 1971 – Nov 1973		
Marvel Feature	vol. 2	#1–7	Nov 1975 – Nov 1976		
Marvel Frontier Comics Unlimited		#1	Jan 1994	one-shot; also known as Marvel Frontier Comics Special	
The Marvel Fumetti Book		#1	Apr 1984	one-shot	
Marvel Girl		#1	Apr 2011	one-shot	
Marvel Gold '76		#1	Nov 2026	one-shot	
Marvel Graphic Novel		#1–20	1982 – 1993		
Marvel Graphic Novel		#21–38	1982 – 1993	officially unnumbered; unofficially numbered by the Official Overstreet Comic Book Price Guide	
Marvel Graphic Novel		#39–75	1982 – 1993	officially unnumbered; see Marvel Graphic Novel for complete listing of titles	
Marvel Graphic Novel	The Pitt (Note: The indicia for this volume includes "Marvel Graphic Novel" as part of the official title, though it is not listed as part of the Marvel Graphic Novel series in the Official Overstreet Comic Book Price Guide.)		1987	variously described as either a one-shot or a graphic novel	
Marvel Heartbreakers		#1	Apr 2010	one-shot	
Marvel Heroes & Legends		#1	Oct 1996	one-shot	
Marvel Heroes & Legends	1997	#1	Oct 1997	one-shot	
Marvel Holiday Special	vol. 1	#1	1991	one-shot	
Marvel Holiday Special	vol. 2	1993	1993	one-shot	
Marvel Holiday Special	vol. 3	1994	1994	one-shot	
Marvel Holiday Special	vol. 4	Annual 1994	1994	one-shot	
Marvel Holiday Special	vol. 5	1996	1996	one-shot	
Marvel Holiday Special	vol. 6	#1	2004	one-shot	
Marvel Holiday Special	vol. 7	2005	Jan 2005	one-shot	
Marvel Holiday Special	vol. 8	#1	Jan 2006	one-shot	
Marvel Holiday Special	vol. 9	#1	Feb 2007	one-shot	
Marvel Holiday Special	vol. 10	Spectacular Magazine	Oct 2009	one-shot	
Marvel Holiday Special	vol. 11	Holiday Magazine	Nov 2010	one-shot	
Marvel Holiday Special	vol. 12	2011	Feb 2012	one-shot	
Marvel Holiday Tales To Astonish		#1	Feb 2025	one-shot	
Marvel Illustrated	The Jungle Book	#1	2007	one-shot	
Marvel Illustrated	Kidnapped!	#1–5	Jan 2009 – May 2009	limited series	
Marvel Illustrated	Last of the Mohicans	#1–6	Jul 2007 – Dec 2007	limited series	
Marvel Illustrated	Moby Dick	#1–6	Apr 2008 – Sep 2008	limited series	
Marvel Illustrated	Picture of Dorian Gray	#1–6	Jan 2008 – Jul 2008	limited series	
Marvel Illustrated	The Iliad	#1–8	Feb 2008 – Sep 2008	limited series	
Marvel Illustrated	The Man in the Iron Mask	#1–6	Sep 2007 – Feb 2008	limited series	
Marvel Illustrated	The Odyssey	#1–8	Nov 2008 – Jun 2009	limited series	
Marvel Illustrated	The Three Musketeers	#1–6	Aug 2008 – Jan 2009	limited series	
Marvel Illustrated	Treasure Island	#1–6	Aug 2007 – Jan 2008	limited series	
Marvel Illustrated: The Swimsuit Issue		#1	1991	continued as Marvel Swimsuit Special	
Marvel Knights	vol. 1	#1–15	Jul 2000 – Sep 2001		
Marvel Knights	vol. 2	#1–6	May 2002 – Oct 2002		
Marvel Knights	4	#1–27	Apr 2004 – Apr 2006	continued as Four	
Marvel Knights	20th	#1–6	Jan 2019 – Mar 2019	limited series	
Marvel Knights	Double Shot	#1–4	Jun 2002 – Sep 2002	limited series	
Marvel Knights	Hulk	#1–4	Feb 2014 – May 2014	limited series	
Marvel Knights	Millennial Visions	#1	Feb 2002	one-shot	
Marvel Knights	Punisher	#1–4	Dec 2025 – May 2026	limited series; Marvel Knights: The World to Come tie-in; also known as Marvel Knights: The Punisher	
Marvel Knights	Spider-Man vol. 1	#1–22	Jun 2004 – Mar 2006	continued as Sensational Spider-Man vol. 2	
Marvel Knights	Spider-Man vol. 2	#1–5	Dec 2013 – Apr 2014	limited series	
Marvel Knights	The World To Come	#1–6	Aug 2025 – Nov 2026	limited series	
Marvel Knights	X-Men	#1–5	Jan 2014 – May 2014	limited series	
Marvel Legacy (2006)	The 1960s Handbook	#1	Feb 2006	one-shot	
Marvel Legacy (2006)	The 1970s Handbook	#1	May 2006	one-shot	
Marvel Legacy (2006)	The 1980s Handbook		Nov 2006	one-shot	
Marvel Legacy (2006)	The 1990s Handbook		Mar 2007	one-shot	
Marvel Legacy (2017)		#1	Nov 2017	one-shot	
Marvel Mangaverse		#1–6	Jun 2002 – Nov 2002		
Marvel Mangaverse	Arcane Avengers	#1	Nov 2026	one-shot	
Marvel Mangaverse	Avengers Assemble!	#1	Mar 2002	one-shot	
Marvel Mangaverse	Eternity Twilight	#1	Mar 2002	one-shot	
Marvel Mangaverse	Fantastic Four	#1	Mar 2002	one-shot	
Marvel Mangaverse	Ghost Riders	#1	Mar 2002	one-shot	
Marvel Mangaverse	Ghostlocke	#1	Nov 2026	one-shot	
Marvel Mangaverse	Iron Knight	#1	Nov 2026	one-shot	
Marvel Mangaverse	New Dawn	#1	Mar 2002	one-shot	
Marvel Mangaverse	Punisher	#1	Mar 2002	one-shot	
Marvel Mangaverse	Spider-Man	#1	Mar 2002	one-shot	
Marvel Mangaverse	Web of Blood	#1	Nov 2026	one-shot	
Marvel Mangaverse	Web of Destiny	#1	Nov 2026	one-shot	
Marvel Mangaverse	X-Men	#1	Mar 2002	one-shot	
The Marvel Masterpieces Collection		#1–4	May 1993 – Aug 1993	limited series	
The Marvel Masterpieces 2 Collection		#1–3	Jul 1994 – Sep 1994	limited series	
Marvel Meow		#1	Mar 2024	one-shot	
Marvel Meow/Strange Scales		#1	Jan 2027	one-shot	
Marvel Monsters (2005)	Devil Dinosaur	#1	Dec 2005	one-shot	
Marvel Monsters (2005)	Fin Fang 4	#1	Dec 2005	one-shot	
Marvel Monsters (2005)	From the Files of Ulysses Bloodstone and the Monster Hunters	#1	Nov 2005	one-shot	
Marvel Monsters (2005)	Monsters on the Prowl	#1	Dec 2005	one-shot	
Marvel Monsters (2005)	Where Monsters Dwell	#1	Dec 2005	one-shot	
Marvel Monsters (2019)		#1	Oct 2019	one-shot	
Marvel Movie Premiere		#1	Sep 1975	one-shot; adaptation of The Land That Time Forgot	
Marvel Mutts		#1	Apr 2025	one-shot	
Marvel Mystery Comics	vol. 2	#1	Dec 1999	one-shot; vol. 1 published by Timely Comics	
Marvel Mystery Comics 70th Anniversary Special		#1	Jul 2009	one-shot	
Marvel Mystery Handbook 70th Anniversary Special			Nov 2009	one-shot	
Marvel Nemesis: The Imperfects		#1–6	Jul 2005 – Dec 2005	limited series; video game tie-in	
The Marvel No-Prize Book		#1	Jan 1983	one-shot	
Marvel Now! Point One		#1	Dec 2012	one-shot	
Marvel: Now What?		#1	Dec 2013	one-shot	
Marvel Pets Handbook		#1	Jun 2009	one-shot	
Marvel Premiere		#1–61	Apr 1972 – Aug 1981		
Marvel Presents		#1–12	Oct 1975 – Aug 1977		
Marvel Preview		#1–24	Feb 1975 – Winter 1980	continued as Bizarre Adventures	
Marvel Preview	1993		Mar 1993	one-shot	
Marvel Riot		#1	Dec 1995	one-shot	
Marvel Rising	vol. 1	#0	Jun 2018	one-shot	
Marvel Rising	vol. 2	#1–5	May 2019 – Sep 2019	limited series	
Marvel Rising	Alpha	#1	Aug 2018	one-shot	
Marvel Rising	Ms. Marvel/Squirrel Girl	#1	Oct 2018	one-shot	
Marvel Rising	Omega	#1	Nov 2018	one-shot	
Marvel Rising	Squirrel Girl/Ms. Marvel	#1	Sep 2018	one-shot	
Marvel Rivals		#1	Jun 2025	one-shot; video game tie-in	
Marvel Rivals	Duel of Kings	#1	Jun 2026	one-shot; video game tie-in	
Marvel Rivals	Hellfire Gala	#1	Oct 2025	one-shot; video game tie-in	
Marvel Rivals	Ignite	#1	Aug 2025	one-shot; video game tie-in	
Marvel Rivals	King in Black	#1	Dec 2025	one-shot; video game tie-in	
Marvel Rivals	The Cities of Heaven	#1	Mar 2026	one-shot; video game tie-in	
Marvel Romance Redux	But I Thought He Loved Me	#1	Apr 2006	one-shot	
Marvel Romance Redux	Guys & Dolls	#1	May 2006	one-shot	
Marvel Romance Redux	I Should Have Been a Blonde	#1	Jul 2006	one-shot	
Marvel Romance Redux	Love is a Four-Letter Word	#1	Aug 2006	one-shot	
Marvel Romance Redux	Restraining Orders Are for Other Girls	#1	Jun 2006	one-shot	
Marvel Saga		#1–25	Dec 1985 – Dec 1987		
Marvel: Shadows and Light		#1	Feb 1997	one-shot	
Marvel Special Edition		#1	Jun 1975	one-shot; Spectacular Spider-Man Treasury	
Marvel Spectacular		#1–19	Aug 1973 – Nov 1975		
Marvel Spotlight	vol. 1	#1–33	Nov 1971 – Apr 1977		
Marvel Spotlight	vol. 2	#1–11	Jul 1979 – Mar 1981		
Marvel Spotlight	Brian Michael Bendis/Mark Bagley	#1	Jan 2007	one-shot	
Marvel Spotlight	Captain America	#1	Jun 2009	one-shot	
Marvel Spotlight	Captain America Remembered	#1	Jun 2007	one-shot	
Marvel Spotlight	Civil War Aftermath	#1	Mar 2007	one-shot	
Marvel Spotlight	Daniel Way/Olivier Coipel	#1	Jun 2006	one-shot	
Marvel Spotlight	Dark Reign	#1	Mar 2009	one-shot	
Marvel Spotlight	Dark Tower	#1	Mar 2007	one-shot	
Marvel Spotlight	David Finch/Roberto Aguirre-Sacasa	#1	May 2006	one-shot	
Marvel Spotlight	Deadpool	#1	Dec 2009	one-shot	
Marvel Spotlight	Ed Brubaker/Billy Tan	#1	Oct 2006	one-shot	
Marvel Spotlight	Fantastic Four/Silver Surfer	#1	May 2007	one-shot	
Marvel Spotlight	Ghost Rider	#1	Mar 2007	one-shot	
Marvel Spotlight	Halo	#1	Sep 2007	one-shot	
Marvel Spotlight	Heroes Reborn/Onslaught Reborn	#1	Dec 2006	one-shot	
Marvel Spotlight	Iron Man Movie	#1	Jun 2008	one-shot	
Marvel Spotlight	Jack Kirby/Stan Lee	#1	Nov 2006	one-shot	
Marvel Spotlight	John Cassaday/Sean McKeever	#1	Feb 2006	one-shot	
Marvel Spotlight	Joss Whedon/Michael Lark	#1	Apr 2006	one-shot	
Marvel Spotlight	Laurell K. Hamilton/George R. R. Martin	#1	May 2008	one-shot	
Marvel Spotlight	Mark Millar/Steve McNiven	#1	Jul 2006	one-shot	
Marvel Spotlight	Marvel Knights 10th Anniversary	#1	Nov 2008	one-shot	
Marvel Spotlight	Marvel Zombies	#1	Nov 2007	one-shot	
Marvel Spotlight	Marvel Zombies Return!	#1	Nov 2009	one-shot	
Marvel Spotlight	Neil Gaiman/Salvador Larroca	#1	Aug 2006	one-shot	
Marvel Spotlight	New Mutants	#1	May 2009	one-shot	
Marvel Spotlight	Robert Kirkman/Greg Land	#1	Jul 2006	one-shot	
Marvel Spotlight	Secret Invasion	#1	Jul 2008	one-shot	
Marvel Spotlight	Secret Invasion Aftermath	#1	Feb 2009	one-shot	
Marvel Spotlight	Spider-Man	#1	May 2007	one-shot	
Marvel Spotlight	Spider-Man - Brand New Day	#1	Sep 2008	one-shot	
Marvel Spotlight	Spider-Man - One More Day/Brand New Day	#1	Dec 2007	one-shot	
Marvel Spotlight	Summer Events	#1	Aug 2009	one-shot	
Marvel Spotlight	The Incredible Hulk	#1	Jun 2008	one-shot	
Marvel Spotlight	The Punisher	#1	Jan 2009	one-shot	
Marvel Spotlight	Thor	#1	Nov 2007	one-shot	
Marvel Spotlight	Ultimates 3	#1	Mar 2008	one-shot	
Marvel Spotlight	Ultimatum	#1	Oct 2008	one-shot	
Marvel Spotlight	Uncanny X-Men 500 Issues Celebration	#1	Aug 2008	one-shot	
Marvel Spotlight	War of Kings	#1	Feb 2009	one-shot	
Marvel Spotlight	Warren Ellis/Jim Cheung	#1	Mar 2006	one-shot	
Marvel Spotlight	Wolverine	#1	Mar 2009	one-shot	
Marvel Spotlight	World War Hulk	#1	Aug 2007	one-shot	
Marvel Spotlight	X-Men: Messiah Complex	#1	Feb 2008	one-shot	
Marvel Spring Special		#1	Oct 1988	one-shot; cover title Elvira: Mistress of the Dark; movie adaptation	
Marvel Super Action	vol. 1	#1	Jan 1976	one-shot	
Marvel Super Action	vol. 2	#1–37	May 1977 – Nov 1981		
Marvel Super Hero Adventures	Inferno	#1	Aug 2018	one-shot	
Marvel Super Hero Adventures	Ms. Marvel and the Teleporting Dog	#1	Sep 2018	one-shot	
Marvel Super Hero Adventures	The Spider-Doctor	#1	May 2018	one-shot	
Marvel Super Hero Adventures	Webs and Arrows and Ants, Oh My!	#1	Aug 2018	one-shot	
Marvel Super Hero Adventures: Captain Marvel	First Day of School!	#1	Sep 2018	one-shot	
Marvel Super Hero Adventures: Captain Marvel	Frost Giants Among Us!	#1	Feb 2019	one-shot	
Marvel Super Hero Adventures: Captain Marvel	Halloween Spooktacular	#1	Dec 2018	one-shot	
Marvel Super Hero Adventures: Captain Marvel	Mealtime Mayhem	#1	Nov 2018	one-shot	
Marvel Super Hero Adventures: Spider-Man	Across the Spider-Verse	#1	Mar 2019	one-shot	
Marvel Super Hero Adventures: Spider-Man	and the Stolen Vibranium	#1	Jun 2018	one-shot	
Marvel Super Hero Adventures: Spider-Man	Spider-Sense of Adventure	#1	May 2019	one-shot	
Marvel Super Hero Adventures: Spider-Man	Web Designers	#1	Jun 2019	one-shot	
Marvel Super Hero Adventures: Spider-Man	Web of Intrigue	#1	Apr 2019	one-shot	
Marvel Super Hero Contest of Champions		#1–3	Jun 1982 – Aug 1982	limited series	
Marvel Super Hero Spectacular		#1	Dec 2015	one-shot	
Marvel Super-Hero Squad	vol. 1	#1–4	Nov 2009 – Feb 2010	limited series	
Marvel Super-Hero Squad	vol. 2	#1–12	Mar 2010 – Feb 2011		
Marvel Super-Hero Squad	Hero Up!	#1	Mar 2009	one-shot	
Marvel Super-Hero Squad	Online Game: Hero Up!	#1	Jun 2011	one-shot	
Marvel Super-Hero Squad	Spectacular	#1	Apr 2011	one-shot	
Marvel Super-Heroes	vol. 1	#1	Oct 1966	one-shot	
Marvel Super-Heroes	vol. 2	#12–105	Dec 1967 – Jan 1982	continued from Fantasy Masterpieces	
Marvel Super-Heroes	vol. 3	#1–15	May 1990 – Oct 1993		
Marvel Super-Heroes Secret Wars		#1–12	May 1984 – Apr 1985	limited series	
Marvel Super-Heroes Secret Wars	Battleworld	#1–4	Jan 2024 – Apr 2024	limited series	
Marvel Super Special		#5–41	1978 – 1986	continued from Marvel Comics Super Special	
Marvel Swimsuit Special		#1–4	1992 – 1995	continued from Marvel Illustrated: The Swimsuit Issue	
Marvel Swimsuit Special	Brand New Beach Day	#1	Sep 2026	one-shot	
Marvel Swimsuit Special	Friends, Foes & Rivals	#1	Sep 2025	one-shot	
Marvel Tails Starring Peter Porker, The Spectacular Spider-Ham		#1	Nov 1983	one-shot	
Marvel Tales	vol. 2	#3–291	Jul 1966 – Nov 1994	vol. 1 published by Atlas Comics; continued from Marvel Tales Annual	
Marvel Tales	Annual	#1–2	1964–1965	continued as Marvel Tales vol. 2	
The Marvel Tarot			Aug 2007	one-shot	
Marvel Team-Up	vol. 1	#1–150	Mar 1972 – Feb 1985		
Marvel Team-Up	vol. 1	Annual #1–7	1976 – 1984		
Marvel Team-Up	vol. 2	#1–11	Sep 1997 – Jul 1998		
Marvel Team-Up	vol. 3	#1–25	Dec 2004 – Dec 2006		
Marvel Team-Up	vol. 4	#1–6	Jun 2019 – Nov 2019		
Marvel: The Lost Generation		#12–1	Mar 2000 – Feb 2001	limited series; published in reverse numerical order	
Marvel: The Year in Review		#1–6	Dec 1989 – 1994		
Marvel Tōkon: First Strike		#1	Oct 2026	one-shot; video game tie-in	
Marvel Treasury Edition		#1–28	1974 – 1981		
Marvel Treasury of Oz		#1	1975	one-shot	
Marvel Treasury Special Featuring Captain America's Bicentennial Battles		#1	1976	one-shot	
Marvel Treasury Special, Giant Superhero Holiday Grab-Bag		#1	1974	one-shot	
Marvel Triple Action	vol. 1	#1–47	Feb 1972 – Apr 1979		
Marvel Triple Action	vol. 1	Giant-Size #1–2	May 1975 – Jul 1975		
Marvel Triple Action	vol. 2	#1–3	May 2009 – Jul 2009		
Marvel Tsum Tsum		#1–4	Oct 2016 – Jan 2017	limited series	
Marvel TV: Galactus - The Real Story		#1	Apr 2009	one-shot	
Marvel Two-in-One	vol. 1	#1–100	Jan 1974 – Jun 1983		
Marvel Two-in-One	vol. 1	Annual #1–7	1976 – 1982		
Marvel Two-in-One	vol. 2	#1–17	Sep 2007 – Jan 2009		
Marvel United: A Pride Special		#1	Aug 2025	one-shot	
Marvel Universe (1998)		#1–7	Jun 1998 – Dec 1998		
Marvel Universe (2012)	Avengers Assemble	#1–13	Feb 2014 – Dec 2014		
Marvel Universe (2012)	Avengers Assemble: Civil War	#1–4	May 2016 – Aug 2016	limited series	
Marvel Universe (2012)	Avengers Assemble Season 2	#1–15	Jan 2015 – March 2016		
Marvel Universe (2012)	Avengers Earth's Mightiest Heroes	#1–18	Jun 2012 – Nov 2013		
Marvel Universe (2012)	Avengers: Ultron Revolution	#1–12	Sep 2016 – Oct 2017		
Marvel Universe (2012)	Guardians of the Galaxy vol. 1	#1–4	Apr 2015 – Jul 2015	limited series	
Marvel Universe (2012)	Guardians of the Galaxy vol. 2	#1–23	Dec 2015 – Dec 2017		
Marvel Universe (2012)	Hulk: Agents of S.M.A.S.H.	#1–4	Dec 2013 – Mar 2014		
Marvel Universe (2012)	Ultimate Spider-Man	#1–31	Jun 2012 – Dec 2014		
Marvel Universe (2012)	Ultimate Spider-Man: Contest of Champions	#1–4	May 2016 – Aug 2016	limited series	
Marvel Universe (2012)	Ultimate Spider-Man Spider-Verse	#1–4	Jan 2016 – Apr 2016	limited series	
Marvel Universe (2012)	Ultimate Spider-Man vs. Sinister Six	#1–11	Sep 2016 – Sep 2017		
Marvel Universe (2012)	Ultimate Spider-Man: Web Warriors	#1–12	Jan 2015 – Dec 2015		
Marvel Universe: Millennial Visions		#1	Feb 2002	one-shot	
Marvel Universe: The End		#1–6	May 2003 – Aug 2003	limited series; also known as Marvel: The End	
Marvel Universe vs.	The Avengers	#1–4	Dec 2012 – Mar 2013	limited series	
Marvel Universe vs.	The Punisher	#1–4	Oct 2010 – Nov 2010	limited series	
Marvel Universe vs.	Wolverine	#1–4	Aug 2011 – Nov 2011	limited series	
Marvel Unleashed		#1–4	Oct 2023 – Jan 2024	limited series	
Marvel Valentine Special		#1	Mar 1997	one-shot	
Marvel vs. DC		#2–3	Mar 1996 – Apr 1996	limited series; issues 1 & 4 published by DC as DC vs. Marvel	
Marvel Westerns	Kid Colt and the Arizona Girl	#1	Sep 2006	one-shot	
Marvel Westerns	Outlaw Files	#1	Jun 2006	one-shot	
Marvel Westerns	Strange Westerns Starring the Black Rider	#1	Oct 2006	one-shot	
Marvel Westerns	The Two-Gun Kid	#1	Aug 2006	one-shot	
Marvel Westerns	Western Legends	#1	Sep 2006	one-shot	
Marvel Winter Break Special		#1	Feb 2026	one-shot	
The Marvel X-Men Collection		#1–3	Jan 1994 – Mar 1994	limited series	
Marvel Zero	vol. 1	#1	Sep 2023	one-shot	
Marvel Zero	vol. 2	#1	Sep 2024	one-shot	
Marvel Zero	vol. 3	#1	Sep 2025	one-shot	
Marvel Zero	vol. 4	#1	Sep 2026	one-shot	
Marvel Zombie		#1	Dec 2018	one-shot	
Marvel Zombies	vol. 1	#1–5	Feb 2006 – Jul 2006	limited series	
Marvel Zombies	vol. 2	#1–4	Aug 2015 – Dec 2015	limited series; Secret Wars (2015) tie-in	
Marvel Zombies	vol. 3	#1–5	Nov 2025 – Mar 2026	limited series; also known as Marvel Zombies: Red Band	
Marvel Zombies	2	#1–5	Dec 2007 – Apr 2008	limited series	
Marvel Zombies	3	#1–4	Dec 2008 – Mar 2009	limited series	
Marvel Zombies	4	#1–4	Jun 2009 – Sep 2009	limited series	
Marvel Zombies	5	#1–5	Jun 2010 – Sep 2010	limited series	
Marvel Zombies	Black, White & Blood	#1–4	Dec 2023 – Mar 2024	limited series	
Marvel Zombies	Dawn of Decay	#1–4	Nov 2024 – Feb 2025	limited series	
Marvel Zombies	Dead Days	#1	Jul 2007	one-shot	
Marvel Zombies	Destroy	#1–5	Jul 2012 – Sep 2012	limited series	
Marvel Zombies	Evil Evolution	#1	Nov 2009	one-shot	
Marvel Zombies	Halloween	#1	Dec 2012	one-shot	
Marvel Zombies	Resurrection vol. 1	#1	Dec 2019	one-shot	
Marvel Zombies	Resurrection vol. 2	#1–4	Nov 2020 – Jan 2021	limited series	
Marvel Zombies	Return	#1–5	Nov 2009	limited series	
Marvel Zombies	Supreme	#1–5	May 2011 – Aug 2011	limited series	
Marvel Zombies	The Book of Angels, Demons & Various Monstrosities	#1	Sep 2007	one-shot	
Marvel Zombies	War Zone	#1–5	Nov 2026 – present	limited series	
Marvel Zombies/Army of Darkness		#1–5	May 2007 – Sep 2007	limited series; also known as Marvel Zombies Vs. Army of Darkness; co-published with Dynamite Entertainment	
Marvel's Ant-Man and the Wasp Prelude		#1–2	May 2018 – Jun 2018	limited series; film tie-in	
Marvel's Ant-Man Prelude		#1–2	Apr 2015 – May 2015	limited series; film tie-in	
Marvel's Avengers	Black Widow	#1	May 2020	one-shot; video game tie-in	
Marvel's Avengers	Captain America	#1	May 2020	one-shot; video game tie-in	
Marvel's Avengers	Hulk	#1	Apr 2020	one-shot; video game tie-in	
Marvel's Avengers	Iron Man	#1	Feb 2020	one-shot; video game tie-in	
Marvel's Avengers	Thor	#1	Mar 2020	one-shot; video game tie-in	
Marvel's Avengers: Endgame Prelude		#1–3	Feb 2019 – Apr 2019	limited series; film tie-in	
Marvel's Avengers: Infinity War Prelude		#1–2	Mar 2018 – Apr 2018	limited series; film tie-in	
Marvel's Black Panther Prelude		#1–2	Dec 2017 – Jan 2018	limited series; film tie-in	
Marvel's Black Widow Prelude		#1–2	Mar 2020 – Apr 2020	limited series; film tie-in	
Marvel's Captain America: Civil War Prelude		#1–4	Feb 2016 – Mar 2016	limited series; film tie-in	
Marvel's Captain America: The First Avenger		#1–2	Jan 2014 – Feb 2014	limited series; movie adaptation	
Marvel's Captain Marvel Prelude		#1	Nov 2018	one shot; film tie-in	
Marvel's Doctor Strange Prelude		#1–2	Sep 2016 – Oct 2016	limited series; film tie-in	
Marvel's Greatest Comics		#23–96	Oct 1969 – Jan 1981	continued from Marvel Collectors' Item Classics	
Marvel's Guardians of the Galaxy Prelude		#1–2	Jun 2014 – Jul 2014	limited series; film tie-in	
Marvel's Guardians of the Galaxy Vol. 2 Prelude		#1–2	Mar 2017 – Apr 2017	limited series; film tie-in	
Marvel's Iron Man 2 Adaptation		#1–2	Jan 2013 – Feb 2013	limited series; film tie-in	
Marvel's Iron Man 3 Prelude		#1–2	Mar 2013 – Apr 2013	limited series; film tie-in	
Marvel's Spider-Man: City at War		#1–6	May 2019 – Oct 2019	limited series	
Marvel's Spider-Man: Homecoming Prelude		#1–2	May 2017 – June 2017	limited series; film tie-in	
Marvel's Spider-Man: The Black Cat Strikes		#1–5	Mar 2020 – Nov 2020	limited series	
Marvel's Spider-Man: Velocity		#1–5	Oct 2019 – Feb 2020	limited series	
Marvel's The Avengers		#1–2	Feb 2015 – Mar 2015	limited series; film tie-in	
Marvel's The Avengers: Black Widow Strikes		#1–3	Jul 2012 – Aug 2012	limited series; film tie-in	
Marvel's The Avengers: The Avengers Initiative		#1	Jul 2012	one-shot; film tie-in	
Marvel's The Avengers Prelude: Fury's Big Week		#1–4	Apr 2012 – Jun 2012	limited series; film tie-in	
Marvel's Thor Adaptation		#1–2	Mar 2013 – Apr 2013	limited series; film tie-in	
Marvel's Thor: Ragnarok Prelude		#1–4	Sep 2017 – Oct 2017	limited series; film tie-in	
Marvel's Thor: The Dark World Prelude		#1–2	Aug 2013	limited series; film tie-in	
Marvel's Voices		#1	Apr 2020	one-shot	
Marvel's Voices	Avengers	#1	Feb 2024	one-shot	
Marvel's Voices	Heritage	#1	Mar 2022	one-shot	
Marvel's Voices	Indigenous Voices	#1	Jan 2021	one-shot	
Marvel's Voices	Legends	#1	Mar 2024	one-shot	
Marvel's Voices	Spider-Verse	#1	Jun 2023	one-shot	
Marvel's Voices	Wakanda Forever	#1	Apr 2023	one-shot	
Marvel's Voices	X-Men	#1	Oct 2023	one-shot	
Marvel's Voices: Community	vol. 1	#1	Feb 2022	one-shot	
Marvel's Voices: Community	vol. 2	#1	Nov 2022	one-shot	
Marvel's Voices: Identity	vol. 1	#1	Oct 2021	one-shot	
Marvel's Voices: Identity	vol. 2	#1	Jul 2022	one-shot	
Marvel's Voices: Legacy	vol. 1	#1	Apr 2021	one-shot	
Marvel's Voices: Legacy	vol. 2	#1	Apr 2022	one-shot	
Marvel's Voices: Pride	vol. 1	#1	Aug 2021	one-shot	
Marvel's Voices: Pride	vol. 2	#1	Aug 2022	one-shot	
Marvel's Voices: Pride	vol. 3	#1	Aug 2023	one-shot	
Marvelman Family's Finest		#1–6	Sep 2010 – Jan 2011	limited series	
The Marvelous Adventures of Gus Beezer	Gus Beezer and Spider-Man	#1	Feb 2004	one-shot	
The Marvelous Adventures of Gus Beezer	Hulk	#1	May 2003	one-shot	
The Marvelous Adventures of Gus Beezer	Spider-Man	#1	May 2003	one-shot	
The Marvelous Adventures of Gus Beezer	X-Men	#1	May 2003	one-shot	
The Marvelous Land of Oz		#1–8	Jan 2010 – Sep 2010	limited series	
Marvels		#0–4	Jan 1994 – Aug 1994	limited series	
Marvels	Epilogue	#1	Sep 2019	one-shot	
The Marvels		#1–12	Jun 2021 – Sep 2022		
Marvels Comics Group	Captain America	#1	Jul 2000	one-shot	
Marvels Comics Group	Daredevil	#1	Jul 2000	one-shot	
Marvels Comics Group	Fantastic Four	#1	Jul 2000	one-shot	
Marvels Comics Group	Spider-Man	#1	Jul 2000	one-shot	
Marvels Comics Group	Thor	#1	Jul 2000	one-shot	
Marvels Comics Group	X-Men	#1	Jul 2000	one-shot	
Marvels: Eye of the Camera		#1–6	Feb 2009 – Apr 2010	limited series	
Marvels: Portraits		#1–4	Mar 1994 – Jun 1994	limited series; also known as Marvel: Portraits of a Universe	
The Marvels Project		#1–8	Oct 2009 – Jul 2010	limited series	
Marvels Snapshot	Avengers	#1	Jan 2021	one-shot	
Marvels Snapshot	Captain America	#1	Aug 2020	one-shot	
Marvels Snapshot	Captain Marvel	#1	Apr 2021	one-shot	
Marvels Snapshot	Civil War	#1	Feb 2021	one-shot	
Marvels Snapshot	Fantastic Four	#1	May 2020	one-shot	
Marvels Snapshot	Spider-Man	#1	Dec 2020	one-shot	
Marvels Snapshot	Sub-Mariner	#1	May 2020	one-shot	
Marvels Snapshot	X-Men	#1	Nov 2020	one-shot	
Marvels X		#1–6	Mar 2020 – Dec 2020	limited series	
Marville		#1–7	Nov 2002 – Jul 2003		
Mary Jane		#1–4	Aug 2004 – Nov 2004	limited series	
Mary Jane	Face It, Tiger	#1	Oct 2026	one-shot	
Mary Jane	Homecoming	#1–4	May 2005 – Aug 2005	limited series	
Mary Jane & Black Cat		#1–5	Feb 2023 – Jun 2023	limited series	
Mary Jane & Black Cat	Beyond	#1	Mar 2022	one-shot	
Masked Rider		#1	Apr 1996	one-shot; TV tie-in	
Master of Kung Fu	vol. 1	#17–125	Apr 1974 – Jun 1983	continued from Special Marvel Edition	
Master of Kung Fu	vol. 1	#126	Jan 2018	one-shot; part of Marvel Legacy event	
Master of Kung Fu	vol. 1	Annual #1	Apr 1976		
Master of Kung Fu	vol. 1	Giant-Size #1–4	Sep 1974 – Jun 1975		
Master of Kung Fu	vol. 2	#1–4	Jul 2015 – Oct 2015	limited series; Secret Wars (2015) tie-in	
Master of Kung Fu	Bleeding Black	#1	Feb 1990	one-shot	
Maverick	vol. 1	#1	Jan 1997	one-shot	
Maverick	vol. 2	#1–12	Sep 1997 – Aug 1998		
Max Ride	Final Flight	#1–5	Nov 2016 – Mar 2017	limited series	
Max Ride	First Flight	#1–5	Jun 2015 – Oct 2015	limited series	
Max Ride	Ultimate Flight	#1–5	Jan 2016 – May 2016	limited series	
M.A.X. Yearbook		#1	1993	one-shot	
Maximum Security		#1–3	Dec 2000 – Jan 2001	limited series	
Maximum Security	Dangerous Planet	#1	Oct 2000	one-shot	
Maximum Security	Thor vs. Ego	#1	Nov 2000	one-shot	
Meals to Astonish: Avengers		#1	Dec 2026	one-shot	
Mech Strike: Monster Hunters		#1–5	Aug 2022 – Dec 2022	limited series	
Meet the Skrulls		#1–5	May 2019 – Aug 2019	limited series	
Mega Morphs		#1–4	Oct 2005 – Dec 2005	limited series	
Mekanix		#1–6	Dec 2002 – May 2003	limited series	
Men in Black	Far Cry	#1	Aug 1997	one-shot	
Men in Black	Retribution	#1	Dec 1997	one-shot	
Men in Black	The Movie	#1	Oct 1997	one-shot; movie adaptation	
Mephisto vs...		#1–4	Apr 1987 – Jul 1987	limited series	
Merry X-Men Holiday Special		#1	Feb 2019	one-shot	
Meteor Man		#1–6	Aug 1993 – Jan 1994	limited series	
Meteor Man	The Movie	#1	Apr 1993	one-shot; adaptation of the 1993 film	
MGM's Marvelous Wizard of Oz		#1	1975	one-shot movie adaptation; co-published with DC	
Micronauts	vol. 1	#1–59	Jan 1979 – Aug 1984		
Micronauts	vol. 1	Annual #1–2	1979 – 1980		
Micronauts	vol. 2	#1–20	Oct 1984 – May 1986	also known as Micronauts: The New Voyages	
Midnight Fantastic Four		#1–	Dec 2026 – present		
Midnight Sons: Blood Hunt		#1–3	Jul 2024 – Sep 2024	limited series	
Midnight Sons Unlimited		#1–9	Apr 1993 – May 1995		
Midnight Spider-Man		#1–	Dec 2026 – present		
Midnight Suns		#1–5	Nov 2022 – Mar 2023	limited series	
Midnight X-Men		#1–	Dec 2026 – present		
The Mighty Avengers	vol. 1	#1–36	May 2007 – Jun 2010		
The Mighty Avengers	vol. 2	#1–14	Nov 2013 – Nov 2014		
The Mighty Avengers	Most Wanted Files	#1	Aug 2007	one-shot	
The Mighty Captain Marvel		#0–9	Feb 2017 – Nov 2017	continued as Captain Marvel vol. 11	
The Mighty Heroes		#1	Jan 1998	one-shot	
The Mighty Marvel Western		#1–46	Oct 1968 – Sep 1976		
Mighty Morphin Power Rangers: The Movie		#1	Sep 1995	one-shot; adaptation of the 1995 movie	
Mighty Mouse	vol. 2	#1–10	Oct 1990 – Jul 1991	vol. 1 published by Timely Comics	
The Mighty Thor	vol. 1	#1–22; 12.1	Jun 2011 – Dec 2012		
The Mighty Thor	vol. 1	Annual #1	Aug 2012		
The Mighty Thor	vol. 2	#1–23	Jan 2016 – Nov 2017		
The Mighty Thor	vol. 3	#700–706	Dec 2017 – Jun 2018	numbering continued from Journey Into Mystery vol. 1	
The Mighty Thor	At the Gates of Valhalla	#1	Jul 2018	one-shot	
The Mighty Thor	Saga	#1	Jun 2011	one-shot	
The Mighty Valkyries		#1–5	Jun 2021 – Nov 2021	limited series	
Miguel O'Hara - Spider-Man: 2099		#1–5	Mar 2024	weekly limited series	
Miles Morales	The End	#1	Mar 2020	one-shot	
Miles Morales	Ultimate Spider-Man	#1–12	Jul 2014 – Jun 2015		
Miles Morales: Spider-Man	vol. 1	#1–42	Feb 2019 – Nov 2022		
Miles Morales: Spider-Man	vol. 1	Annual #1	2021		
Miles Morales: Spider-Man	vol. 2	#1–42	Feb 2023 – Mar 2026		
Miles Morales: Spider-Man	vol. 2	Annual #1	2024		
Miles Morales: Spider-Man	vol. 3	#1–	Oct 2026 – present		
Millie the Model		#144–207	Dec 1966 – Dec 1973	continued from Millie the Model Comics	
Millie the Model		Annual #1–12	1962 – 1975		
Millie the Model Comics		#104–143	Sep 1961 – Nov 1966	previous issues published by Atlas Comics; continued as Millie the Model	
Minimum Carnage	Alpha	#1	Dec 2012	one-shot	
Minimum Carnage	Omega	#1	Jan 2013	one-shot	
Miracleman	vol. 1	#1–16	Mar 2014 – May 2015		
Miracleman	vol. 2	#0	Dec 2022	one-shot	
Miracleman by Gaiman & Buckingham		#1–6	Nov 2015 – Mar 2016	limited series	
Miracleman by Gaiman & Buckingham	The Silver Age	#1–7	Dec 2022 – Mar 2024	limited series	
Miss America Comics 70th Anniversary Special		#1	Aug 2009	one-shot	
Mission: Impossible		#1	May 1996	one-shot; adaptation of the 1996 film	
Mockingbird		#1–8	May 2016 – Dec 2016		
Mockingbird: S.H.I.E.L.D. 50th Anniversary		#1	Nov 2015	one-shot	
Modeling with Millie		#21–54	Feb 1963 – Jun 1967	continued from Life with Millie	
Models, Inc.		#1–4	Oct 2009 – Jan 2010	limited series	
M.O.D.O.K.	Assassin	#1–5	Jul 2015 – Nov 2015	limited series; Secret Wars (2015) tie-in	
M.O.D.O.K.	Head Games	#1–4	Feb 2021 – Jun 2021	limited series	
M.O.D.O.K.	Reign Delay	#1	Nov 2009	one-shot; Dark Reign tie-in	
A Moment of Silence		#1	Feb 2002	one-shot	
Monica Rambeau: Photon		#1–5	Feb 2023 – Jun 2023	limited series	
Monster Menace		#1–4	Dec 1993 – Mar 1994	limited series	
Monsters on the Prowl		#9–30	Feb 1971 – Oct 1974	continued from Chamber of Darkness	
Monsters Unleashed	vol. 2	#1–5	Mar 2017 – May 2017	limited series; vol. 1 published by Magazine Management	
Monsters Unleashed	vol. 3	#1–12	Jun 2017 – May 2018		
Moon Girl and Devil Dinosaur	vol. 1	#1–47	Jan 2016 – Nov 2019		
Moon Girl and Devil Dinosaur	vol. 2	#1–5	Feb 2023 – Jun 2023	limited series	
Moon Girl and Devil Dinosaur	10th Anniversary Special	#1	Jun 2025	one-shot	
Moon Girl Team-Up	Avengers & Moon Girl	#1	Oct 2022	one-shot; part 2 of 3	
Moon Girl Team-Up	Miles Morales & Moon Girl	#1	Aug 2022	one-shot; part 1 of 3	
Moon Girl Team-Up	X-Men & Moon Girl	#1	Nov 2022	one-shot; part 3 of 3	
Moon Knight	vol. 1	#1–38	Nov 1980 – Jul 1984		
Moon Knight	vol. 2	#1–6	Jun 1985 – Dec 1985	limited series	
Moon Knight	vol. 3	#1–4	Jan 1998 – Apr 1998	limited series	
Moon Knight	vol. 4	#1–4	Jan 1999 – Feb 1999	limited series	
Moon Knight	vol. 5	#1–30	Jun 2006 – Jul 2009		
Moon Knight	vol. 5	Annual #1	2008		
Moon Knight	vol. 6	#1–12	Jul 2011 – Jun 2012		
Moon Knight	vol. 7	#1–17	May 2014 – Sep 2015		
Moon Knight	vol. 8	#1–14	Jun 2016 – Jul 2017		
Moon Knight	vol. 9	#188–200	Jan 2018 – Dec 2018	numbering continued from vol. 1	
Moon Knight	vol. 10	Annual #1	Nov 2019	one-shot	
Moon Knight	vol. 11	#1–30	Sep 2021 – Feb 2024		
Moon Knight	vol. 11	Annual #1	2022		
Moon Knight	vol. 11	Annual #1	2023	2nd Annual #1 published in this volume	
Moon Knight	vol. 12	Annual #1	2024	one-shot	
Moon Knight	Black, White & Blood	#1–4	Jul 2022 – Oct 2022	limited series	
Moon Knight	City of the Dead	#1–5	Sep 2023 – Jan 2024	limited series	
Moon Knight	Divided We Fall		Jan 1992	one-shot	
Moon Knight	Fist of Khonshu	#0–15	Sep 2024; Dec 2024 – Feb 2026		
Moon Knight	Silent Knight	#1	Jan 2009	one-shot	
Moon Knight	Special Edition	#1–3	Nov 1983 – Jan 1984	limited series	
Moonstar		#1–5	May 2026 – Sep 2026	limited series	
Morbius		#1–5	Jan 2020 – May 2020		
Morbius	Bond of Blood	#1	Apr 2021	one-shot	
Morbius	Revisited	#1–5	Aug 1993 – Dec 1993	limited series	
Morbius	The Living Vampire vol. 1	#1–32	Sep 1992 – Apr 1995		
Morbius	The Living Vampire vol. 2	#1–9	Mar 2013 – Nov 2013		
Morlocks		#1–4	Jun 2002 – Sep 2002	limited series	
Mort the Dead Teenager		#1–4	Dec 1993 – Mar 1994	limited series	
Mortigan Goth: Immortalis		#1–4	Sep 1993 – Mar 1994	limited series	
Mosaic		#1–8	Dec 2016 – Jul 2017		
Mother Teresa of Calcutta		#1	1984	one-shot	
Motormouth		#1–5	Jun 1992 – Oct 1992	continued as Motormouth & Killpower	
Motormouth & Killpower		#6–12	Nov 1992 – May 1993	continued from Motormouth	
Mr. and Mrs. X		#1–12	Sep 2018 – Aug 2019		
Mrs. Deadpool and the Howling Commandos		#1–4	Aug 2015 – Nov 2015	limited series; Secret Wars (2015) tie-in	
Ms. Marvel	vol. 1	#1–23	Jan 1977 – Apr 1979		
Ms. Marvel	vol. 2	#1–50	May 2006 – Apr 2010		
Ms. Marvel	vol. 2	Annual #1	Nov 2008		
Ms. Marvel	vol. 2	Giant-Size #1	Apr 2006		
Ms. Marvel	vol. 2	Special #1	Mar 2007		
Ms. Marvel	vol. 2	Special: Storyteller #1	Jan 2009		
Ms. Marvel	vol. 3	#1–19	Apr 2014 – Dec 2015		
Ms. Marvel	vol. 4	#1–38	Jan 2016 – Apr 2019		
Ms. Marvel	vol. 5	Annual #1	Sep 2024	one-shot	
Ms. Marvel	Beyond the Limit	#1–5	Feb 2022 – Jun 2022	limited series	
Ms. Marvel	Mutant Menace	#1–4	May 2024 – Aug 2024	limited series; Fall of the House of X tie-in	
Ms. Marvel	The New Mutant	#1–4	Oct 2023 – Jan 2024	limited series; Fall of X tie-in	
Ms. Marvel Team-Up	Ms. Marvel & Moon Knight	#1	Oct 2022	one-shot; part 2 of 3	
Ms. Marvel Team-Up	Ms. Marvel & Venom	#1	Nov 2022	one-shot; part 3 of 3	
Ms. Marvel Team-Up	Ms. Marvel & Wolverine	#1	Oct 2022	one-shot; part 1 of 3	
Multiple Man		#1–5	Aug 2018 – Dec 2018	limited series	
The Muppets Take the Marvel Universe		#1	Nov 2026	one-shot	
Murderworld	Avengers	#1	Jan 2023	one-shot; part 1 of 5	
Murderworld	Game Over	#1	May 2023	one-shot; part 5 of 5	
Murderworld	Moon Knight	#1	Apr 2023	one-shot; part 4 of 5	
Murderworld	Spider-Man	#1	Feb 2023	one-shot; part 2 of 5	
Murderworld	Wolverine	#1	Mar 2023	one-shot; part 3 of 5	
Mutant 2099		#1	Nov 2004	one-shot	
The Mutant Misadventures of Cloak and Dagger		#1–13	Oct 1988 – Aug 1990	continued as Cloak and Dagger vol. 3	
Mutant X		#1–32	Oct 1998 – Jun 2001		
Mutant X		1999, 2000, 2001	1999 – 2001	Annuals	
Mutant X	Dangerous Decisions	#1	Jun 2002	one-shot; TV tie-in	
Mutant X	Origin	#1	May 2002	one-shot; TV tie-in	
Muties		#1–6	Apr 2002 – Sep 2002	limited series	
Mutopia X		#1–5	Sep 2005 – Jan 2006	limited series; House of M tie-in	
My Love	vol. 2	#1–39	Sep 1969 – Mar 1976	vol. 1 published by Atlas Comics	
My Love	vol. 2	Special #1	Dec 1971		
MyS-TECH Wars		#1–4	Mar 1993 – Jun 1993	limited series	
Mystery Men		#1–5	Aug 2011 – Nov 2011	limited series	
Mystic Arcana	Black Knight	#1	Sep 2007	one-shot; part 2 of 4	
Mystic Arcana	Magik	#1	Aug 2007	one-shot; part 1 of 4	
Mystic Arcana	Scarlet Witch	#1	Oct 2007	one-shot; part 3 of 4	
Mystic Arcana	Sister Grimm	#1	Jan 2008	one-shot; part 4 of 4	
Mystic Comics 70th Anniversary Special		#1	Oct 2009	one-shot	
The Mystic Hands of Dr. Strange		#1	May 2010	one-shot	
Mystique	vol. 1	#1–24	Jun 2003 – Apr 2005		
Mystique	vol. 2	#1–5	Dec 2024 – Apr 2025	limited series	
Mystique and Sabretooth		#1–4	Dec 1996 – Mar 1997	limited series; also known as Sabretooth and Mystique	
Mythos	Captain America	#1	Aug 2008	one-shot	
Mythos	Fantastic Four	#1	Dec 2007	one-shot	
Mythos	Ghost Rider	#1	Mar 2007	one-shot	
Mythos	Hulk	#1	Oct 2006	one-shot	
Mythos	Spider-Man	#1	Aug 2007	one-shot	
Mythos	X-Men	#1	Mar 2006	one-shot	
