= List of current Marvel Comics publications =

This is a list of active and upcoming Marvel Comics printed comic books (as opposed to digital comics, trade paperbacks, hardcover books, etc.). The list is updated as of November 18, 2026.

== Ongoing series ==
=== Active ===
| Title | Issues | Pub. Year | Date of Final Issue | Ref. |
|---|---|---|---|---|
| The Amazing Spider-Man | #1– | 2025 | | |
| Avengers | #1– | 2026 | | |
| Black Cat | #1– | 2025 | | |
| Captain America | #1– | 2025 | | |
| Daredevil | #1– | 2026 | | |
| Fantastic Four | #1– | 2025 | | |
| Iron Man | #1– | 2026 | | |
| Marc Spector: Moon Knight | #1– | 2026 | | |
| Miles Morales: Spider-Man | #1– | 2026 | | |
| The Punisher | #1– | 2026 | | |
| Spider-Woman | #1– | 2026 | | |
| Thor | #800– | 2026 | | |
| The Uncanny X-Men | #1– | 2024 | | |
| Venom | #1– | 2026 | | |
| Wade Wilson: Deadpool | #1– | 2026 | | |
| Wolverine | #1– | 2024 | | |
| X-Men | #1– | 2024 | | |
| X-Men United | #1– | 2026 | | |
| X-Orcists | #1- | 2026 | | |
Midnight
| Midnight Fantastic Four | #1– | 2026 | | |
| Midnight Spider-Man | #1– | 2026 | | |
| Midnight X-Men | #1– | 2026 | | |

=== Upcoming ===
| Title | Issues | Pub. Year | Date of First Issue | Ref. |
|---|---|---|---|---|
| Maximum X-Men | #1– | 2026 | December 2, 2026 | |
| The Spectacular Spider-Man | #6– | 2026 | November 25, 2026 | |
| Spider-Punk | #1- | 2027 | January 20, 2027 | |

== Limited series ==
=== Active ===
| Title | Issues | Pub. Year | Date of Final Issue | Ref. |
|---|---|---|---|---|
| Amazing Venom | #1–5 | 2026 | January 6, 2027 | |
| Black Panther/Namor: Doomed | #1–5 | 2026 | January 6, 2027 | |
| DoomQuest | #1–10 | 2026 | | |
| Friendly Neighborhood Mary Jane | #1-5 | 2026 | | |
| Gambit: Gone | #1–5 | 2026 | January 13, 2027 | |
| Gambit: Wanted | #1–5 | 2026 | January 20, 2027 | |
| Spider-Man/Hulk: Fire & Brimstone | #1–5 | 2026 | January 20, 2027 | |
| Spider-Man: Long Way Home | #1–5 | 2026 | February 17, 2027 | |
| Tomb of Apocalypse | #1–5 | 2026 | December 16, 2026 | |
| Wolverine: Paradise | #1–5 | 2026 | | |
20th Century Studios
| Alien Vs. X-Men | #1–4 | 2026 | | |
| Predator Vs. Punisher | #1-4 | 2026 | | |
| Predator Vs. The Planet of the Apes | #1–5 | 2026 | November 25, 2026 | |
Marvel Zombies
| Marvel Zombies: War Zone | #1–5 | 2026 | January 6, 2027 | |
Star Wars
| Star Wars: The Book of Boba Fett | #1–7 | 2026 | December 9, 2026 | |
| Star Wars: The Fall of Kylo Ren | #1–5 | 2026 | December 2, 2026 | |

=== Upcoming ===
| Title | Issues | Pub. Year | Date of First Issue | Ref. |
|---|---|---|---|---|
| Black Widow: Black, White & Red Room | #1-4 | 2026 | December 16, 2026 | |
| Fugitive X-Force | #1-5 | 2026 | December 9, 2026 | |
| Hulk War: Infernal Rage | #1-5 | 2027 | February 3, 2027 | |
| Jean Grey | #1-5 | 2026 | November 25, 2026 | |
| Jessica Jones: Alias | #1-5 | 2026 | December 23, 2026 | |
| Magneto: End of Days | #1-8 | 2027 | February 3, 2027 | |
| Marvel SFX: Thwip | #1-5 | 2027 | January 27, 2027 | |
| Venom: POV | #1-5 | 2026 | December 2, 2026 | |
| Wolverine: Origin III - The Dark Age | #1-5 | 2026 | December 16, 2026 | |
| Your Friendly Neighborhood Spider-Man | #1-4 | 2026 | December 9, 2026 | |
20th Century Studios
Star Wars
| Star Wars: Ahsoka - Escape From Thrawn | #1-5 | 2027 | January 20, 2027 | |
| Star Wars/Marvel: Hope Assembles | #1-5 | 2027 | January 13, 2027 | |

== See also ==
- Marvel Comics
- Fresh Start - Marvel Comics initiative launched in 2018
- List of Timely and Atlas Comics publications
- List of current DC Comics publications
