= Alternative versions of Storm =

Interpretations of the Marvel character

Alternate versions of Storm
- Publisher: Marvel Comics
- First appearance: Giant-Size X-Men #1 (May 1975)
- Created by: Len Wein; Dave Cockrum
- Characters: Storm (Marvel Comics); Storm (X-Men: The Animated Series and X-Men '97 character); Bloodstorm; Ultimate Storm; Midnight Storm
- See also: Storm in other media

Storm was created by Len Wein and Dave Cockrum. There had been multiple alternative versions of Storm, both in the main continuity as well as alternate stories.

== Age of Apocalypse ==
In Age of Apocalypse, an alternate future Storm is a member of the X-Men, but more streetwise and tough, and her romantic interest is Quicksilver. Her appearance differs in that she has a black lightning tattoo over her left eye and a bob hair cut.

Years after the fall of Apocalypse, Weapon X (the AoA version of Wolverine, whose mind was twisted into making him the heir of Apocalypse) captured and renamed her as Orordius after using the Celestial technology on her to enslave and transform her into a blind seer made of living stone.

== Deadpool Corps ==
Deadpool visits a world where Professor X runs an orphanage for troubled kids where Storm is the headmistress. Kid versions of Cyclops and Deadpool are sent to her office for causing trouble during Beast's class.

== Demon Days ==
In the Demon Days universe, Ororo and her brother Sosuke are the respectively the gods of lightning and thunder, collectively known as the Living Storm, tasked by the Oni Ogin to capture Ogin's sister, Mariko Yoshida.

== Excalibur ==
On Earth-597, a world where the Nazis won World War II, Storm is a member of the Reichsmen, genetic experiments of Herr Moira MacTaggert to turn mutants into Nazi-loyal weapons, appearing emaciated and near-mummified, yet at the same time muscular, with almost no nose.

== Marvel Adventures ==
In the Marvel Adventures universe, Storm is a member of the Avengers and the X-Men, and a former member of the Serpent Society, who is engaged to Thor. She is later amongst the X-Men beaten up by Spider-Man after he mistakes them for assassins, while they try to recruit Spider-Man's girlfriend Sophia "Chat" Sanduval.

== Marvel Mangaverse ==
In the Marvel Mangaverse, Storm is a witch who trained with Abigail Hefton. She is later seen as a mutant. It is implied she was killed by The Hand.

== Marvel Zombies ==
The basic premise of the various Marvel Zombies stories is that almost all super-powered beings on Earth have become flesh-eating zombies after being infected by an alien virus, becoming the most dominant of all zombies. Alongside Thor, Dr. Strange, Colossus, and Nightcrawler, Storm is one of the last super-humans on her world to become a zombie. Storm dies when a small group of recovered super-heroes gain the powers of the Silver Surfer and attack her. She is one of the many zombies seen attacking Dr. Doom's castle. She is one of the first zombies to get inside along with fellow infected X-Men Nightcrawler and Beast, and is also seen when a group of infected zombies attack Magneto, Reed Richards and other former heroes alongside other infected zombies, though it was the last.

== Marriage to Doctor Doom ==
X-Men/Doctor Doom: The Chaos Engine posits an alternative future for Storm in which she, under her birth name Ororo, marries Victor von Doom and lives a happy married life as Empress von Doom of Earth, following Doom becoming the undisputed ruler of Earth, with Ororo bearing Victor two children and the heirs to Earth: their son Kristoff von Doom, and their daughter Qadira von Doom.

== Marriage to Forge ==
New X-Men posits an alternative future for Storm in which she, under her birth name Ororo, marries Forge and lives a happy married life in his building, Eagle's Plaza in Dallas, Texas. They have two children: a girl, Orora, and a baby boy, Naze. The robot mutant-hunter Nimrod travels from the future towards the New X-Men, but his time-traveling systems are damaged and need repair. He forces Forge to help him, viciously killing Storm and threatening to kill their daughter and son. Forge helps Nimrod, sending him to Earth-616 where he fights the New X-Men.

== Marriage to Thor ==
X-Treme X-Men posits an alternative future for Storm in which she marries Thor and lives a happy married life as one of the Gods of Earth, from where she rules the universe as Almighty Storm, Skybreaker and All-Mother, Queen of All There Is. After being mentally enslaved by her world's Charles Xavier to become a dictator, she is freed from his control by the X-Men, whom she offers the gift of godhood and immortality. Only Emma Frost-Summers accepts Almighty Storm's offer.

== Amalgam Universe ==
In the Amalgam Universe (Earth-0602, a combination of the Marvel and DC Universes), Ororo nearly drowns as a child, only to be rescued by Queen Hippolyta of the Amazons. Hippolyta raises young Ororo as the Amazon princess Ororo of Themyscira (beside her own daughter Diana) on the island of Themiscyra. Ororo eventually leaves her island home to enter "Man's World" as the hero Amazon (also known as Wonder Woman), becoming the leader of the JLX.

== Marvel: NOW WHAT! ==
In Marvel: NOW WHAT!, set on Earth-231013, Storm has a daughter with Spider-Man, known as Spider-Storm, who inherits both of her parents' superpowers and becomes the leader of the X-Vengers.

== Midnight Universe ==
In Midnight X-Men, Storm is depicted as a mutant vampire known as an "empyre".

== Ultimate Marvel ==
In the Ultimate Marvel continuity, Storm is a founding member of the Ultimate X-Men, created by Mark Millar and Joe Quesada. This Storm is an illegal immigrant from Morocco who lived in Athens, Texas as a car thief prior joining the X-Men. In contrast to her mainstream counterpart, Ultimate Storm initially has trouble controlling her powers. For example, she once passes out after reluctantly summoning an electrical storm in order to destroy a fleet of Sentinels; her reluctance stemming from a past incident where she nearly electrocuted a playground full of children. After her lover Beast's apparent death, a grief-stricken Storm drastically alters her appearance. Written to act as the team's conscience, she then started a relationship with Wolverine. In the "Shock and Awe" arc, Yuriko "Yuri" Oyama is revealed to be Storm's archenemy.

== Ultimate Universe ==
During the "Ultimate Invasion" storyline, Maker visited Earth-6160 and remade it into his own image. Ororo is depicted as a freedom fighter with the codenames Storm and Wind-Rider, assisting her lover Killmonger in the fight against Lord Ra and Lord Khonshu who make up the duo Moon Knight, continuing into Ultimate Black Panther. Ororo later saves Black Panther from Moon Knight's men. Black Panther and Killmonger meet up with Ororo in an underground Vibranium cave where they show him a large green orb that they don't want falling into the hands of their enemies. Storm and Killmonger are later brought to the Temple of the Sacred Dead where T'Challa introduces them to Shuri and Okoye. Showing the large green orb to Shuri, T'Challa tells Storm to use her abilities on it. This causes a lot of plants to emerge at a rapid rate causing T'Challa to have then incinerated. Storm later assists Shuri in fighting a farmer that Lord Khonshu was controlling. The farmer disappears along with the green orb. As she and Erik make out, Storm states to him that they earned a hospitality where the bed is not made from grass. In West Africa, Storm and Killmonger assist Black Panther in fighting Lord Ra and Lord Khonshu's soldiers where they are instructed to pacify them. Storm summons some winds to use on some of the soldiers. Afterwards, Storm says to Black Panther that he is more kind than his enemy and hopes that he doesn't regret it. The next day when T'Challa sends Killmonger and Okoye to seek out someone who is both a mystic and a scientist and bring them to Wakanda, Storm asks if she can go with Killmonger. T'Challa agrees and tells her not to kill anybody. Before Storm and Killmonger go on their quest, Black Panther asks them to join him on the battlefield. When fighting Lord Ra and Lord Khonshu's soldiers, Black Panther has Storm charge his Vibranium armor with the lightning she summons as he unleashes it's force on the soldiers.

== Days of Future Past ==
In the dystopian Days of Future Past storyline of Chris Claremont (1981), Storm is one of the last fighters of the mutant resistance and is killed by a horde of robotic, mutant-hunting Sentinels.

== Earth X ==
In a contemporary alternative universe, the Earth X series (started 1999 by Jim Krueger), Storm is known as "Queen Storm" and is married to Black Panther, something that happens in the mainstream universe seven years later.

== Exiles ==
Several versions of Storm have appeared in Exiles.

- A version of Storm that was similar to her mainstream counterpart was killed by the Phoenix in a world where Jean Grey manifested the Phoenix force in a manner reminiscent of The Dark Phoenix Saga.
- One of the more prominent versions of Storm is a sixteen-year-old version of Ororo Munroe who is a member of the ruthless reality-hopping team Weapon X. She is later killed stopping an evil version of Bruce Banner.
- A version of Storm wed to Wolverine known as Queen Ororo who rules over a third of a ruined Earth, and is at war with the other two thirds, led by Black Panther and Namor.
- A version of Storm from a world where humans evolved from insects, partnered with Spider-Man when the Exiles come to help them defeat the invading Shi'ar Imperial Guard.
- A version of Storm who remained married Black Panther, and bore him two children: a daughter named Sh'ri a son named T'Chaka II.

== House of M ==
When a crazed Scarlet Witch remade the world into the world of the House of M by Brian Michael Bendis (2005), Storm is a Kenyan princess. During the final battle, Rogue absorbs the powers of Ororo, along with Namor and Genis-Vell.

== Mutant X ==
Bloodstorm is a version of Storm from a world where she is a vampire. Though introduced as a supporting character in Mutant X, she quickly became the breakout character of the series, editors reporting that the majority of fan mail to Mutant X was focused on her. Bloodstorm's history branches from her mainstream counterpart during the events of The Uncanny X-Men #159, in that she was not saved from the bite of Dracula and was transformed into a vampire. As she still retains her oath not to kill (in mainstream continuity she did not break that oath until The Uncanny X-Men #170, after her encounter with Dracula), Bloodstorm employs Forge and Kitty Pryde as food sources, draining from them enough to sustain herself but not to kill them. She leaves the X-Men and joins the team The Six. An alternate version of Bloodstorm is later staked by Deadpool in Deadpool Kills the Marvel Universe Again.

=== Publication history ===
Bloodstorm co-starred in Mutant X #1–32 (Oct. 1998–June 2001) and the Mutant X 2000 Annual. She crossed over into the Earth X alternative universe in the miniseries Paradise X #1–2 (May–Aug. 2000).

=== Fictional character biography ===
After being bitten by Dracula, Storm was transformed into a vampire. She quit the X-Men for a time, trying her best not to succumb to bloodlust, and sought help from her lover Forge. He voluntarily became her food source so that she would not have to kill. In addition, she also fed on Kitty Pryde from time to time, destabilizing their previous relationship of parent-figure and child.

On a mission with her to steal from the group the Thieves Guild, teammate Gambit was critically wounded. He begged Bloodstorm to grant him eternal vampiric life; when she reluctantly performed the task, Gambit nonetheless ran away in anger. Around the time Havok had split off from this reality's X-Men to form his own group, Bloodstorm returned and became one of the founding members of The Six.

A despot known as the Goblyn Queen ascends to power, brainwashing the Six into serving her. However, the team breaks free of her influence and defeats her, choosing to remain with Havok and reform the team with the new goal of saving mutants from this reality's crazed espionage chief Nick Fury and his organization, S.H.I.E.L.D.

On a side mission, Bloodstorm fought the leader of the Outsiders — this reality's version of the Morlocks— to free captive friends. As in main Marvel continuity, she was successful, thus becoming the underground group's leader.

Havok eventually found a means to cure some to the side-effects of Bloodstorm's and Gambit's vampirism, granting the two a serum which helped to satiate their bloodlust and allowed them to walk in sunlight. Later, upon Dracula's reawakening, Bloodstorm battled him and victoriously staked her sire through the heart.

Bloodstorm later appeared in a different parallel universe, helping to save it. In reward, she was given a blood transfusion from her counterpart in that reality, effectively ridding her of her vampirism.

Madelyne Pryor later came to Bloodstorm's dimension at a time when she killed Professor X and invited her to join her team of Hex Men in return for curing her vampirism. During a battle against the time-displaced X-Men in Madelyne's home dimension, Bloodstorm sees how Madelyne doesn't care about what happens to the Hex Men as long as she gets what she wants. Bloodstorm convinces the Beast to help her betray Madelyne and send her and the rest of the Hex Men to the underworld. Now stuck in another dimension, the X-Men invite Bloodstorm to join their team. She acts as a member of the X-Men Blue and begins to develop a relationship with the time-displaced version of Cyclops; however, she is killed in Extermination by Ahab when he impales her with a spear and she dies in Cyclops' arms. Bloodstorm is later given a proper burial by the X-Men.

=== Powers and abilities ===
Aside from her control over the weather, Bloodstorm is also able to transform into a mist, summon, control, and transform into vermin and other animals such as wolves and bats, and drain blood through her fangs. Also, like any vampire, Ororo has the ability to turn others into vampires. She also has superhuman strength.

== Limbo Storm ==
In Uncanny X-Men #160 and in the Magik (Illyana and Storm) limited series, an alternative Storm is introduced, who lives the remaining years of her life in the demonic realm of Limbo. This Storm turns to her heritage of sorcery in old age as her power over the elements waned. She tutors Illyana Rasputin in the use of good magics and battles the demon Belasco over control of Limbo. She is killed by Illyana after a demonically altered version of Kitty Pryde named Cat seriously injured her, to forbid Belasco to sacrifice Storm to the Elder Gods.

== Old Man Logan ==
In the Old Man Logan world, Storm is among the X-Men who perish at the hands of Wolverine when he is tricked by Mysterio into believing his friends are super-villains attacking the mansion.

== X-Men: Forever ==
In the alternative reality of X-Men: Forever (with a history identical to 616) that begins after Chris Claremont's X-Men #1-3, Storm kills Wolverine for unknown reasons as an agent of the Consortium (as yet unrevealed) and betrays the X-Men. As the X-Men search for her in New York City, an adolescent Storm with short hair appears to Gambit, just as young as she had appeared to him before. When Beast checks for bloodwork, both Storms are identical. The questions are, which one is real, and did Storm just turn on them or has she been fooling them her entire time with the X-Men? The younger version is called Ro, and stays with the X-Men, even wearing the standard blue and gold uniform. It is eventually revealed that the adult Storm is a clone that was created as part of a plan to defeat the Consortium's schemes, only to be driven insane when part of her powers included an energy-absorbing matrix that absorbed part of the twisted psyche of the Shadow King, while the young Storm is the result of a teleportation accident splitting her de-aged body from her adult consciousness, her adult personality manifesting as an energy matrix that requires a suit of armour specially designed by Tony Stark to maintain cohesion. At the series conclusion, with the Storm clone – now calling herself 'Perfect Storm' having become Wakanda's Queen after killing the Black Panther, the other two Storms merge into another adult Storm, keeping Perfect Storm prisoner while taking her place as Wakanda's Queen to undo the harm she had caused.

== Predator vs. Marvel ==
In the Predator vs. Marvel world, Storm is among the X-Men who perish at the hands of the Yautja Bad Bloods, using vibranium weapons.

== What If...? ==
Marvel's What If...? comic book series, which imagines alternative realities for Marvel characters, has featured Storm several times.

- In Issue #12 of the second series, Storm becomes a goddess of Asgard and its ruler in Thor's stead, after being given the Stormbringer by Loki to restore her powers after losing them. In the Secret Wars tie-in series Thors, she returns on ending up on Battleworld, and receives her own Mjolnir on joining the Thor Corps. This version of her would be voiced by Alison Sealy-Smith in the third season of What If...?. Another version of her was also featured in X-Men: Millennial Visions.
- In Issue #25 of the second series, Storm becomes one of the seven Brides of Set (alongside Andromeda, Dagger, Invisible Woman, Marvel Girl, Scarlet Witch, and She-Hulk), who slaughter the heroes of Earth. Storm then gives birth to one of Set's children, who eats her.
- In issue #34 of the second series, Storm became an air traffic controller instead of a superhero, the stress of her job causing her to uncontrollably cause thunderstorms that downed planes.
- Issue #40 of the second series sees her refusing to join the X-Men and remaining a thief.
- In issue #74 of the second series, she is a potential X-Men recruit targeted by Mister Sinister, written as the shady leader of the X-Men.
- Issue #79 of the second series depicts Storm as the wielder of the Phoenix force, calling herself Stormphoenix and being the ruthless tyrant of Earth, freezing every opposition in the atmosphere; this plot ends in Storm's death.
- In issue #114 of the second series, Storm marries her fellow X-Man, the feral Wolverine and bears his daughter Kendall Logan. Kendall becomes the hero known as Torrent, having some of her mother's control over weather as well as her father's feral abilities. The relationship between Wolverine and Storm was previously shown in the X-Men: The Animated Series episode "One Man's Worth" (1995), which the issue diverges from.

== X-Campus ==
In the world of X-Campus, Storm is a teenager with an alcoholic father who attends Worthington Foundation and is roommates with Anna Raven. Unlike the main continuity version, she only has white hair when she uses her powers, having brown hair normally.

== X-Force (vol. 7) ==
In X-Force (vol. 7), an alternate version of Ororo Munroe named Tufani is introduced, who serves as the superhero Tempest. Bearing her fellow mutant Forge before his disappearance, Tufani and her team find themselves transported to Earth-616 after Nuklo disrupts the Nexus of All Realities, with Tufani being killed by Nuklo in the ensuing battle.

== See also ==
- Storm in other media
