= Marvel Collectors' Item Classics =

- Issue #9 (June 1967), with word-balloon dialog by "Stan" [Lee], "Sol" [Brodsky], "Flo" [Steinberg] and other 1960s staffers, epitomizing a then-small Marvel's in-jokey, fan-based marketing

Publication information
- Publisher: Marvel Comics
- Schedule: Bimonthly
- Format: Ongoing series
- Genre: Superhero
- No. of issues: Marvel Collectors' Item Classics: #1–22 (Feb. 1965 – Aug. 1969); Marvel's Greatest Comics: #23–96 (Oct. 1969 – Jan. 1981)
- Main character(s): Doctor Strange, Fantastic Four, the Hulk, Iron Man

Creative team
- Written by: Robert Bernstein, Stan Lee, Larry Lieber
- Artist(s): Steve Ditko, Don Heck, Jack Kirby

Marvel Collectors' Item Classics was an American comic book series published by Marvel Comics in the mid- to late-1960s that marked the first reprinting of many of the earliest Marvel stories. Primarily focused on the Fantastic Four, Iron Man, Doctor Strange, and the Hulk, it ran 22 issues before changing its name and page-count, becoming Marvel's Greatest Comics.

== Publication history ==
One of several 68-page, 25-cent "giant-size" comic books that supplemented publishers' regular 36-page, 12-cent lines, Marvel Collectors' Item Classics premiered as an annual publication in 1965. That first issue, dated February 1965 in its postal indicia though not on the cover, reprinted The Fantastic Four #2 (Jan. 1962) and The Amazing Spider-Man #3 (July 1963), as well as the Ant-Man story from Tales to Astonish #36, and the first "Tales of Asgard" featurette, from Journey into Mystery #97 (Oct. 1963). It was a sister publication of what was then the annual, giant-size reprint series Marvel Tales.

MCIC, as it was often abbreviated in Marvel Comics text pages, became a bimonthly series beginning with issue #2 (April 1966), which reprinted The Fantastic Four #3 (March 1962), The Amazing Spider-Man #4 (Sept. 1963), and the Ant-Man story from Tales to Astonish #37 (Nov. 1962).

Rare new cover art, by Jack Kirby and John Verpoorten, on the reprint comic Marvel Collectors' Item Classics #19 (Feb. 1969)

Dropping Spider-Man the following issue — with that superhero's stories going on to anchor Marvel Tales — the comic began reprinting what would be its regular line-up: The Fantastic Four, The Incredible Hulk, Iron Man stories from Tales of Suspense, and Doctor Strange stories from Strange Tales. Six issues included short semi-anthological "Tales of the Watcher" science-fiction stories hosted by and sometimes featuring Uatu the Watcher.

The reprints were generally in serial order, with occasional skips; missing, for instance, are The Fantastic Four #5–6, already reprinted in Fantastic Four Annual #2–3 (1964–1965); #11, already partly reprinted in Annual #3; #12, never reprinted at the time; #19, reprinted in heavily edited form in the 1967 promotional one-shot America's Best TV Comics; and #25–26, reprinted in Fantastic Four Annual #4 (1966).

The covers of issues #1–11 each reprinted two to four covers of the comics reprinted inside. Issues of The Incredible Hulk were not reprinted in full, but generally as chapters spread across two to three issues apiece.

=== Marvel's Greatest Comics ===
With issue #23 (Oct. 1969), the series changed its title and reduced its page-count to 52, exchanging its Hulk stories for shorter "Tales of the Watcher" vignettes. They and such incidentals as pin-ups were replaced by Captain America stories from Tales of Suspense in #25–28. Afterward, the comic reprinted two Fantastic Four stories each issue, usually with a Human Torch and the Thing feature from Strange Tales, before becoming a standard 36-page comic with #35 (June 1972), reprinting Fantastic Four stories, at the then-regular price of 20 cents.

The series ran through #96 (Jan. 1981), reprinting a truncated, 23-page version of the 34-page Fantastic Four #116.
