= Midnight Universe =

Marvel Comics imprint

"Midnight Universe" thematic stories

Publication information
- Publisher: Marvel Comics
Title(s)
- Midnight Spider-Man
- Midnight Fantastic Four
- Midnight X-Men
- Genre: Horror; Superhero
- Publication date: October 2026

The Midnight Universe is a 2026 American superhero horror comic book imprint founded by Marvel Comics.

== Publication history ==
On May 7, 2026, Marvel Comics released an enigmatic message announcing the launch of Midnight, described as "a terrifying new universe", for that fall. Four days later, on May 11, Marvel announced the launch of the Midnight Universe, an imprint featuring an all-new publishing line of superhero horror comic books set in an alternate timeline to the Marvel Universe. With the announcement of the Midnight Universe, its first three titles were revealed: Midnight X-Men launches the line in August, followed by Midnight Fantastic Four in September and Midnight Spider-Man in October. The following month, Marvel Comics announced that the release dates for Midnight X-Men and Midnight Fantastic Four had been postponed to October, with both series—along with Midnight Spider-Man—debuting on the 7th of that month. Although Marvel had originally planned a staggered release for the Midnight Universe titles starting in August, the publisher decided to restructure the launch into a single, massive one-day event, with those three comics being the only new Marvel releases that day. The main covers of the Midnight Universe titles feature the "Cloaked Cover" trade dress, which conceals the full artwork until the reader opens the issue. With the exception of the debut issues, the complete artwork remains shrouded in shadow, revealing itself only to those who pick them up on stands. The first three editions of each series are released monthly on the same day through December; starting in January 2027, they will all be released in different weeks.

In July 2026, Marvel announced a new "Ongoing Variant Cover Program" for the three Midnight Universe titles—allowing readers to choose their favorite covers and ensuring their local comic shop knew exactly which ones they wanted each month—with the series featuring recurring themes across covers labeled A through E. The themes for Covers A-E are: Regular (Cover A), the series's main cover presented with the Cloaked Midnight trade dress; Midnight Bloodbath Variant (Cover B), blood-drenched covers depicting the horror of the Midnight Universe; Midnight Special Variant (Cover C), spotlight covers featuring reinterpretations of Marvel heroes—both new and old—through the Midnight aesthetic; Midnight Horror Homage Variant (Cover D), covers inspired by iconic horror imagery; and Midnight Gallery Variant (Cover E), covers featuring high-quality painted art that captures the unsettling atmosphere of the Midnight Universe.

== List of titles ==
=== Ongoing ===
Title	Issues	Publication date	Writer(s)	Artist(s)	Letterer(s)	Colorist(s)	Ref.
Midnight Spider-Man	#1–	October 7, 2026	Phillip Kennedy Johnson	ScieTronc	Neeraj Menon	Joe Caramagna	
Midnight Fantastic Four	#1–	October 7, 2026	Benjamin Percy	Kev Walker	Frank D'Armata	Joe Sabino	
Midnight X-Men	#1–	October 7, 2026	Jonathan Hickman	Matteo Della Fonte	Arthur Hesli; Matt Hollingsworth	Cory Petit	

=== One-shots ===
Title	Publication date	Writer(s)	Artist(s)	Letterer(s)	Colorist(s)	Ref.
Midnight Universe Black & White Ashcan Edition	July 25, 2026	Phillip Kennedy Johnson; Benjamin Percy; Jonathan Hickman	ScieTronc; Kev Walker; Matteo Della Fonte	—N/a		

== See also ==
- Midnight Sons, a Marvel Comics team of horror-themed characters.
- New Universe, an unsuccessful Marvel Comics imprint from the late 1980s.
- Ultimate Marvel, a Marvel Comics imprint used to modernize classic characters in a new continuity.
  - Ultimate Universe, a reboot of Ultimate Marvel.
- Marvel Zombies, a Marvel Comics horror-themed metaseries.
- Absolute Universe, a similar imprint created by DC Comics.
