= Jennifer Percy =

American writer

- Born: Oregon
- Education: Iowa Writers' Workshop
- Occupation: Writer
- Relatives: Benjamin Percy (brother)
- Website: www.jenpercy.com

Jennifer Percy is an American writer. Her work has been published in The New York Times, Harper's, and The New Republic.

== Career ==
Jen Percy is a graduate of the Iowa Writers' Workshop, where she received a Truman Capote Fellowship in fiction. She also received an Iowa Arts Fellowship from Iowa’s Nonfiction Writing Program. She won of a Pushcart Prize, and a grant from the National Endowment for the Arts, and MacDowell Foundation.

Her work has appeared in a number of magazines, including Harper’s, The New Republic, and The Oxford American. She has taught writing at New York University and Columbia University.

Percy's first book, Demon Camp: A Soldier's Exorcism, was published in 2014 by Simon and Schuster and was reviewed by The New York Times.

The book focuses on post-traumatic stress disorder and what it means to be haunted by trauma. Percy drew inspiration from a newspaper article the suicide of a man haunted by an Iraqi soldier he’d killed, talking to his ghost every night. She too became almost haunted by bats which were seemingly following her. One morning, she found a cereal bowl with a dead bat in the milk.

== Awards and honors ==
In 2012, Percy received a grant from the National Endowment for the Arts. In 2013, she won a Pushcart Prize.

In 2017, she won the National Magazine Award for Feature Writing.

In 2020, she was honored with a Dart Center award.

== Works ==
- Demon Camp. Simon and Schuster. February 10, 2015. ISBN 978-1-4516-6206-1.
- Girls Play Dead. New York, NY: Doubleday. November 11, 2025. ISBN 978-0-385-55004-8.

== Personal life ==
Jen's brother is writer Benjamin Percy.
