= Midnight Spider-Man =

2026 comic book series by Marvel Comics inc

- Cover of Midnight Spider-Man #1 (October 2026). Art by Steve Beach.

Publication information
- Publisher: Marvel Comics
- Schedule: Monthly
- Format: Ongoing series
- Genre: Horror; Superhero
- Publication date: October 7, 2026 –
- Main character: Spider-Man

Creative team
- Written by: Phillip Kennedy Johnson
- Artist: ScieTronc
- Letterer: Joe Camaragna
- Colorist: Neeraj Menon

Midnight Spider-Man is a 2026 American horror-superhero comic book series published by Marvel Comics, based on the character Spider-Man. Written by Phillip Kennedy Johnson and illustrated by ScieTronc, it is one of the first three titles under Marvel's Midnight Universe imprint, which began on October 7, 2026.

== Plot ==
When he was six years old, Peter Parker accidentally left his cat Bamf outside when he and his parents went on vacation and came home to find her as a rotting corpse in their backyard after being attacked by a dog. His father, Richard, teaches his traumatized son that "power makes monsters, every time." Twelve years later, Peter lives alone with his Uncle Ben, who has been pushing a lawsuit against Oscorp for the mysterious deaths of Peter's parents. Peter works as a research assistant for Doctor Curt Connors at Empire State University and also operates online as a pop-science activist under the alias "Sagan Ritual", focusing on exposing corrupt corporations.

On his eighteenth birthday, his work catches the attention of Felicia Hardy, vice president of Oscorp's Talent Relations, who takes him to Osborn Square to recruit him to the science division of the company. Despite knowing their corrupt history, Peter accepts the offer in hopes of changing the company from within and helping his and Ben's financial situation.

Unbeknownst to Peter, during his visit to Oscorp, a spider exposed to gamma radiation and growth hormones from the company's unethical experiments on poor people to create a new species of mutants crawled into his backpack. When he returned home that night, the spider bites Ben and liquefies his body before it drastically increases in size and lodges itself onto Peter's chest, transforming him into a human-spider hybrid.

After Peter fails to show up for work at ESU and Oscorp the next day, Oscorp lead scientist Doctor Otto Octavius shows Felicia footage of the spider leaving with Peter and tasks her with retrieving it. She arrives at his home with security guards Mac Gargan and Anton Rodriquez, who are brutally murdered upon attacking the mutated Peter. He escapes under duress searching for Ben, alerting nearby police officer Misty Knight.

== Publication history ==
In mid-May 2026, Marvel Comics announced the ongoing comic book series Midnight Spider-Man as one of the first three titles under the publisher's then-recently announced Midnight Universe imprint, with Phillip Kennedy Johnson as writer and ScieTronc as illustrator. Johnson said the comic reinvents the story of Peter Parker / Spider-Man transforming into a half-man, half-arachnid hybrid through "a [David] Cronenberg or John Carpenter lens", referring to those filmmakers' respective body horror films, The Fly (1986) and The Thing (1982).

Johnson stated that ScieTronc came to the project through Jean-David Morvan, a French comic book writer and scout who manages studios in France, Japan, and Korea, and who has introduced various international artists to Marvel over the years. Johnson described ScieTronc's artistic style—a blend of manga, Japanese horror cinema influences, and Korean manhwa—as a perfect fit for Midnight Spider-Man, and added that the collaboration encouraged him to read more manga, including works by Junji Ito and Hideo Yamamoto's Homunculus (2003–2011), which ultimately influenced the story of Midnight Spider-Man, noting that Japanese comics handle horror "so effectively, even more effectively than Western comics"; this was particularly helpful for Johnson in developing the character of Peter in Midnight Spider-Man, as he went so far as to create an original in-story manga that the character reads and that informs his choices throughout the series.

Midnight Spider-Man began publication on October 7, 2026.

=== Issues ===
Issue	Publication date	Ref.
#1	October 7, 2026	
#2	November 18, 2026	

== See also ==
- Man-Spider, the name typically given to Spider-Man's mutated, monstrous human-spider hybrid form from the mainline comics.
- Ultimate Spider-Man, a previous Marvel Comics storyline in which Peter Parker gains arachnid powers and immortality due to an Oscorp-created radioactive spider.
- "The Other", a Marvel Comics storyline where Spider-Man evolves into a mutated spider.
