= List of current DC Comics publications =

Comics published by DC Comics that are still running

This is a list of active and upcoming DC Comics printed comic books (as opposed to digital comics, trade paperbacks, hardcover books, etc.). The list is updated as of November 4, 2026.

== Ongoing series ==
=== Active ===
Title	Issues	Pub. Year	Date of Final Issue	Ref.
Action Comics	#957 - 1104	2016		
Barbara Gordon: Breakout	#1 - 7	2026		
Batgirl	#1 - 25	2024		
Batman	#1 - 15	2025		
Batman / Superman: World's Finest	#1 - 57	2022		
Batwoman	#1 - 9	2026		
Catwoman	#1 - 93	2018		
Deathstroke the Terminator	#1 - 9	2026		
The Demon	#1 - 2	2026		
Detective Comics	#934 - 1115	2016		
Doom Patrol	#1 - 3	2026		
Emperor Aquaman	#15 - 23	2026		
The Flash	#1 - 38	2023		
The Fury of Firestorm	#1 - 8	2026		
Gangs of Gotham	#1 -	2026		
Green Lantern	#1 - 40	2023		
Green Lantern Corps	#1 - 22	2025		
Harley Quinn	#1 - 67	2021		
Justice League Unlimited	#1 - 24	2024		
Legion of Super-Heroes	#1 - 3	2026		
Lobo	#1 - 9	2026		
New Titans	#33 - 41	2026		
Nightwing	#1 - 144	2016		
Poison Ivy	#1 - 49	2022		
Supergirl	#1 - 19	2025		
Superman	#1 - 43	2023		
Superman Unlimited	#1 - 19	2025		
Teen Titans	#1 - 3	2026		
Wonder Woman	#1 - 39	2023		
Zatanna	#1 - 7	2026		
Absolute Universe
Absolute Batman	#1 - 25	2024		
Absolute Flash	#1 - 21	2025		
Absolute Green Lantern	#1 - 20	2025		
Absolute Superman	#1 - 25	2024		
Absolute Wonder Woman	#1 - 25	2024		
Vertigo
Bleeding Hearts	#1 - 9	2026		
End of Life	#1 - 10	2026		

=== Upcoming ===
Title	Issues	Pub. Year	Date of First Issue	Ref.
Batman: Shadow of the Bat	#1-	2027	February 24, 2027	
Static	#1-	2027	February 24, 2027	

== Limited series ==
=== Active ===
Title	Issues	Pub. Year	Date of Final Issue	Ref.
Batman & Robin: Year One - Dynamic Duos	#1 - 12	2026		
Batman: Bad Seeds – Gotham General	#1 - 2	2026	November 25, 2026	
Bizarro: Year None	#1 - 4	2026	December 23, 2026	
Clayface: Celebrity Dirt	#1 - 6	2026	December 9, 2026	
The Deadman	#1 - 12	2026		
Jonah Hex and the Shadow of Death	#1 - 6	2026		
Absolute Universe
Absolute Catwoman	#1 - 12	2026		
Absolute Green Arrow	#1 - 12	2026		
Black Label
Superman: The Stranger	#1 - 6	2026		
Elseworlds
Dark Knights of Steel II	#1 - 12	2026		
Supergirl: Survive	#1 - 6	2026	January 27, 2027	
Vertigo
100 Bullets: The US of Anger	#1 - 7	2026	January 7, 2027	
Black Tower: The Raven Conspiracy	#1 - 6	2026	January 27, 2027	

=== Upcoming ===
Title	Issues	Pub. Year	Date of First Issue	Ref.
Batman: Reign of Assassins	#1 - 5	2027	February 17, 2027	
Green Lantern: Doomed Cosmos	#1 - 6	2027	January 20, 2027	
Swamp Thing: Hallowed Ground	#1 - 6	2027	February 24, 2027	
Vertigo
Hide Nor Hair	#1 - 6	2027	January 6, 2027	

== See also ==
- DC Comics
- List of current Marvel Comics publications
