= New X-Men =

New X-Men may refer to:

- New X-Men (2001 series), written by Grant Morrison, retitled from X-Men (Vol. 2)
- New X-Men (2004 series), by Craig Kyle and Christopher Yost, continuing from New Mutants (Vol. 2) and originally titled New X-Men: Academy X
