= Marvel Swimsuit Special =

Annual parody magazine issue (1991–1995)

- Cover to Marvel Swimsuit Special #1

Publication information
- Publisher: Marvel Comics
- Schedule: Yearly
- Genre: Superhero
- Publication date: 1991 – 1995; 2025 – present
- No. of issues: 6

Creative team
- Written by: Various
- Artist: Various
- Editor(s): Bobbie Chase (1991-1992); Evan Skolnick (1993); Chris Cooper (1994-1995); Wil Moss (2025)

The Marvel Swimsuit Special (formerly Marvel Illustrated: The Swimsuit Issue) is an annual magazine-styled comic book originally published by Marvel Comics from 1991 to 1995. A parody of the Sports Illustrated Swimsuit Issue, the series features pin-ups of Marvel Comics characters in swimwear. It has been the subject of both criticism and praise. A revival of the series, titled Marvel Swimsuit Special: Friends, Foes & Rivals, was published in 2025; initially intended to be a one-off, it was followed by Marvel Swimsuit Special: Brand New Beach Day in 2026.

== History ==
=== Original run ===
The Marvel Swimsuit Special was developed in the early 1990s, when the "pervasiveness of bikini bodies in American culture was apparent to everyone" through media such as Baywatch, MTV Beach House, and the Sports Illustrated Swimsuit Issue, the lattermost of which would heavily influence the Marvel Swimsuit Special. The series was additionally influenced by the Amazing Heroes Swimsuit Issue series, first published by Fantagraphics Books as Amazing Heroes #115 in April 1987. That series, which featured unlicensed depictions of various mainstream comics characters, featured artwork by multiple artists who would later go on to work for Marvel Comics in an official capacity, including Stuart Immonen and Ty Templeton.

Tom DeFalco, the editor-in-chief of Marvel Comics during the majority of the Marvel Swimsuit Special's publication run, has characterized the decision to produce the series as being largely financially motivated. As Marvel's licensing, animation, and film divisions struggled in the 1990s (culminating in the company filing for Chapter 11 bankruptcy protection in 1996), the company became increasingly sales-focused in its comic division. The concept of a comic series that imitated the successful Sports Illustrated Swimsuit Issue was proposed multiple times, and was ultimately published in 1991. Similarly to many comics released in the era of comics speculation, the Marvel Swimsuit Special was marketed as a collector's item that would appreciate in value over time.

=== Attempted revivals ===
In January 2015, artists Kris Anka and Kevin Wada announced that they had ceased production on a new version of the Marvel Swimsuit Special after being unable to reach an agreement with Marvel over the book's publication. Planned as a 52-page art book split evenly between male and female characters, the artists shared completed artwork of Gambit, Hellion, and Robbie Reyes that would have appeared in the book on Anka's Tumblr account. Though outlets initially reported the book as a title that had been solicited and cancelled by Marvel, Anka later clarified that the project was an artists' sketchbook that they had pitched to Marvel for their approval, and that he and Wada made the decision to not move forward with the project.

On April 18, 2019, a revival of Marvel Swimsuit Special titled Marvel Summer Special was announced, with cover artwork by Adam Hughes and Ron Lim. The series was slated for release in July of that year, to coincide with the 80th anniversary of Marvel Comics. Three weeks later, the issue was pulled from Marvel's release schedule and Diamond Comics' Previews retail catalog, effectively cancelling the title. Marvel gave no reason for the issue's cancellation, beyond a statement that the issue would "not be resolicited."

=== Revival ===
A revival of the Swimsuit Special titled Marvel Swimsuit Special: Friends, Foes & Rivals was announced on April 17, 2025 and published on July 9, 2025. The issue includes a combination of plot-driven story and pinup illustrations, as well as previews of swimsuits that later appeared in the video game Marvel Rivals as in-game costumes. Owing to the issue garnering a positive response, Marvel announced on March 20, 2026 that the comic would continue, with a new issue titled Marvel Swimsuit Special: Brand New Beach Day coming out on July 1 of that year. Brand New Beach Day contains four stories written by Cody Ziglar, Daniel Kibblesmith, Rainbow Rowell, and Anthony Oliveira.

== Content ==
The Marvel Swimsuit Special primarily features pin-up style illustrations of characters from Marvel's main franchises, including the Avengers, the X-Men, the Fantastic Four, Spider-Man, and others such as Alpha Flight. The tone of the series is broadly tongue-in-cheek and humorous, rather than explicitly erotic. Both male and female characters are included in the Marvel Swimsuit Special; DeFalco stated that the series "[broke] a lot of walls in terms of sexualizing some of the male characters," though the inclusion of male characters was hypothesized by critics as preemptively deflecting criticism that the series sexually objectified women. Early issues in the series featured mostly women and included men primarily in group images, though by the mid-1990s it had achieved a more equitable gender balance, with male characters featured in both group images and pin-up style illustrations. According to writer Warren Ellis, male characters were included at the direction of Christian Cooper, who edited the final two issues of the Swimsuit Special.

Multiple artists are featured in each edition of the magazine, including Joyce Chin, Mike Deodato, Jan Duursema, Greg and Tim Hildebrandt, Adam Hughes, Joe Madureira, Joe Phillips, Dan Panosian, Joe Quesada, Brian Stelfreeze, and numerous others. The first issue in the series, Marvel Illustrated: The Swimsuit Issue, featured multiple parody advertisements and fake interviews with various Marvel characters, though these sections were removed or scaled back in subsequent issues.

Each issue has a theme, setting, and a briefly-outlined plot that served as a framing device for the issue's illustrations. Marvel Illustrated: The Swimsuit Issue is set during the "Super Olympics" organized by Stark Industries in the Savage Land, with the images presented as characters modelling swimwear designed by Janet van Dyne. Marvel Swimsuit Special #1 is set in Wakanda, with the illustrations presented as photographs from Black Panther and Monica Lynne's engagement party. Marvel Swimsuit Special #2 centers on Pip the Troll using the Infinity Gems to transport the heroes of the Marvel Universe to Monster Island for a beach party. Marvel Swimsuit Special #3 follows the celebration of "The Water Festival of the Inhumans" on the Moon, while Marvel Swimsuit Special #4 centers on the prince of Madripoor inviting heroes to the country to boost its tourism industry. Friends, Foes, & Rivals follows the heroes of the Marvel Universe creating a swimsuit issue in response to the Roxxon Energy Corporation creating an unauthorized AI-generated swimsuit issue with their likenesses.

== List of issues ==
Issue	Release date	Cover character(s) & artist	Centerfold character(s) & artist	Setting	Tagline(s)
Marvel Illustrated: The Swimsuit Issue	January 1991	She-Hulk by Brian Stelfreeze	Mary Jane Watson by Joe Jusko	Savage Land	"A Sophisticated Parody for Everyone Who Loves Marvel Comics"; "The Boys (and Girls) of Summer"; "The Super Olympics Down Under"
Marvel Swimsuit Special #1	1992	Storm by Marc Silvestri	Psylocke by Jim Lee	Wakanda	"Take A Wakanda Wild Side!"
Marvel Swimsuit Special #2	1993	Rogue by Joe Jusko	Black Widow by Adam Hughes	Monster Island	"Join Marvel's Hottest Super Heroes for Big Fun on Monster Island!"
Marvel Swimsuit Special #3	1994	Invisible Woman and Namor by Adam Hughes	Rogue and Gambit by the Brothers Hildebrandt	The Moon	"Come to the Moon and Explore Heavenly Bodies Guaranteed to Send You Into Orbit!"
Marvel Swimsuit Special #4	1995	Rogue and Gambit by the Brothers Hildebrandt	Jean Grey and Cyclops by the Brothers Hildebrandt	Madripoor	"Mad for Madripoor"
Marvel Swimsuit Special: Friends, Foes and Rivals	July 9, 2025	Black Widow, Black Panther, Captain America, and Captain Marvel by Adam Hughes	n/a	n/a	"Friends, Foes and Rivals"

== Reception ==
=== Critical reception ===
Panels of Psylocke by Roger Cruz (left) and Northstar and Hector by Jan Duursema (right) from Marvel Swimsuit Special #4. By the end of the series' original run, it had achieved approximate gender parity in its depicted characters.

The Marvel Swimsuit Special received a mixed critical reaction. Comics writer Chris Claremont has called the series "problematic and plagued by the inherent disadvantage female characters face," and criticized its focus on titillation over storytelling. Reappraising the series for The Comics Journal in 2011, comics critic Richard Cook dismissed the Swimsuit Special as "spank material for nerdy teenage boys" and criticized the quality of the series' artwork, noting that the ostensibly sexualized swimsuits of multiple female characters were ironically just as revealing as their standard superhero costumes. Cook cites the inclusion of objectified male characters as serving an aspirational function for heterosexual male readers and a sexual function for heterosexual female and gay male readers, concluding that the series is "puerile, but it's a smart puerile that understood its target audience."

Conversely, critic Megan Byrd has praised the Marvel Swimsuit Special in Women Write About Comics, arguing that the series "fulfill[s] fans' desires to see the characters sexualized, without that goal distracting or minimizing the content of in-continuity stories." Byrd praised the series for its unadorned fan service, particularly its sexualization of both male and female characters. In a separate review for Women Write About Comics, critic Wendy Browne argued that the sexualized artwork of the Swimsuit Special compares favorably to sexualized artwork in narrative-focused comic books, specifically citing Milo Manara's criticized variant cover for Spider-Woman #1, arguing that sexualization in the Marvel Swimsuit Special is "contextual rather than gratuitous."

=== Legacy ===
Subsequent to the release of the first Marvel Swimsuit Special, numerous swimsuit issues were published by a variety of comic book publishers, including Homage Studios Swimsuit Special from Image Comics in 1993, Lady Death: Swimsuit from Chaos Comics in 1994, and Avengelyne Swimsuit Book from Maximum Press in 1995. A variant cover for the 2016 Street Fighter Swimsuit Special published by Udon Entertainment directly tributes the cover artwork for Marvel Illustrated: The Swimsuit Issue, with Chun-Li in place of She-Hulk.

In 2015, nude illustrations of Marvel characters appeared in that year's Body Issue of ESPN The Magazine, which was contrasted by ComicsAlliance to the Marvel Swimsuit Special. In 2016, Marvel published "Mighty Men of Marvel", a series of variant covers featuring beefcake-themed art. Writing for ComicsAlliance, writer Andrew Wheeler criticized the largely non-sexualized images as lacking the "confidence that Marvel showed twenty years ago with its famously tongue-in-cheek Swimsuit Specials."

In 2018, the Marvel Swimsuit Special was referenced in Multiple Man #4 (2018), in which Jamie Madrox sends duplicates of himself to a variety of alternate timelines, including a timeline inspired by the Marvel Swimsuit Special. That same year, a fan art tribute to the Marvel Swimsuit Special was organized by comics writer Leah Williams under the hashtag #MarvelSwimsuit2018.

== See also ==
- X-Women (X-Men: Ragazze in fuga) (2009), by Milo Manara and Chris Claremont
