= Midnight Fantastic Four =

2026 comic book series by Marvel Comics

- Cover of Midnight Fantastic Four #1 (October 2026). Art by Kev Walker.

Publication information
- Publisher: Marvel Comics
- Schedule: Monthly
- Format: Ongoing series
- Genre: Lovecraftian horror; Superhero
- Publication date: October 7, 2026 –
- Main character: Fantastic Four

Creative team
- Written by: Benjamin Percy
- Artist: Kev Walker

Midnight Fantastic Four is a 2026 American Lovecraftian horror-superhero comic book series published by Marvel Comics, based on the superhero team the Fantastic Four. Written by Benjamin Percy and illustrated by Kev Walker, it is one of the first three titles under Marvel's Midnight Universe imprint, which debuted on October 7, 2026.

== Plot ==
Dr. Reed Richards is fired by the New York Institute of Technology for neglecting his teaching duties in favor of solving interdimensional travel. Before the university confiscates his equipment and research, he breaks in that night to run one last test drive on the gate with his research assistant, Victor Von Doom. He takes medication to help him focus on solving the formulas, but when he activates the gate, he fails to notice Victor adjusting the connection, resulting in an explosion that blows up the building and horribly mutilates and mutates Victor.

Reed is arrested for his crimes, but is later released by Sue Storm, the owner of an aerospace company called Storm Systems. She is accompanied by her security advisor, Ben Grimm, and her younger brother, Johnny, a pilot who lost both of his legs in a crash. They take him to the company's headquarters in San Francisco, where Sue shows him footage of one of her rockets exploding near the site of the Manhattan Project. She slows down the tape to reveal that a large, purple cosmic entity from another dimension caused the crash, and wants Reed's help in creating a portal to its home, the Negative Zone.

Meanwhile, Victor's corpse is brought to Latveria, where he is restored to life by his mother, donning an armor and green cloak.

== Publication history ==
In mid-May 2026, Marvel Comics announced the ongoing comic book series Midnight Fantastic Four as one of the first three titles under the publisher's then-recently announced Midnight Universe imprint, with Benjamin Percy as writer and Kev Walker as illustrator. Percy cited the works of H. P. Lovecraft—specifically the eldritch horror stories—as inspiration for the comic. By August, Percy had 24 issues outlined.

Midnight Fantastic Four began publication on October 7, 2026.

=== Issues ===
Issue	Publication date	Ref.
#1	October 7, 2026	
#2	November 18, 2026	

== See also ==
- This Man... This Monster!, a Fantastic Four story which delves into what classifies someone as a monster and introduces an alternate dimension known as the Negative Zone.
- Planetary, a comic book series in which the Four, a villanous pastiche of the Fantastic Four, hoard Earth's secrets for themselves.
- Fantastic Four: 1234, a psychological and cosmic horror Fantastic Four storyline featuring Doctor Doom as an antagonist.
- Ultimate Fantastic Four, a modernized retelling of the Fantastic Four's origins.
  - Marvel Zombies, a series of titles beginning with two Ultimate Fantastic Four story arcs in which the Fantastic Four are corrupted by a zombie virus.
  - FANT4STIC, an adaptation of Ultimate Fantastic Four with body horror elements.
- "Realm of Kings", a Marvel Comics storyline where the Fantastic Four of the Cancerverse are given monstrous forms and brainwashed by the Many-Angled Ones.
