= Predator vs. Marvel =

Comic book limited series

Publication information
- Publisher: Marvel Comics
- Format: Limited series
- Publication date: September 2023 – December 2025
- No. of issues: 17
- Main character(s): Wolverine; Black Panther; Spider-Man; Kraven the Hunter; Yautja

Creative team
- Written by: Ben Percy
- Artists: Greg Land (#1); Andrea Di Vito (#2); Ken Lashley (#3–4)
- Letterer: Cory Petit
- Editor: Sarah Brunstad

Collected editions
- Predator vs. Wolverine: ISBN 978-130295-5045
- Predator vs. Black Panther: ISBN 978-130296-0346
- Predator vs. Spider-Man: ISBN 978-130296-3354
- Predator Kills the Marvel Universe: ISBN 978-130296-5068

Predator vs. Marvel is an American comic book series written by Ben Percy, drawn by Greg Land, Andrea Di Vito, and Ken Lashley and published by Marvel Comics. A crossover between the Predator franchise and the Marvel Universe, the initial limited series, Predator vs. Wolverine, followed James "Logan" Howlett / Wolverine as he is subjected to a "Long Hunt" by a Yautja over the course of a century.

Receiving a universally positive critical reception, the series was republished as a graphic novel in April 2024, and was followed by Predator vs. Black Panther (2024), Predator vs. Spider-Man, and Predator Kills the Marvel Universe (both 2025), all again written by Ben Percy.

== Plot ==
=== Predator vs. Wolverine ===
Each issue begins with an ongoing, brutal duel between Wolverine and a Predator from the Yautja in the middle of a Canadian forest. As Logan and the hunter continue to fight, he reflects on the decades of battling this alien species that led to this moment.

His first encounter with the Yautja was in the Alaskan wilderness in 1900, when he worked as a hunter who sold animal pelts. As he heads into Athabascan territory to escape a storm, a Predator arrives and comes across another member of his species frozen in the ice, where he takes a Shuriken from the corpse. Logan is hired by a prospector named Tucker, who claims a crew of rivals took his son hostage. As they approach the rivals' base, they find several skinned animals and members of the Athabascan tribe. Believing the criminals responsible, Logan murders them in a rage before he is shot by Tucker, who reveals he lied about having a son and hired the criminals to perform a railroad robbery. Before Tucker leaves with the cash, his head is blown off by the Predator, who challenges Logan to a fight. Caught off guard by the alien's weaponry, Logan lures him to a cave to be attacked by a grizzly bear. Believing he's won, Logan leaves, though unbeknownst to him, the Predator survived and beheaded the bear.

Years later, Logan, now with the codename Wolverine, is sent with Team X to investigate a guerrilla force planning a coup in South America. They are confronted by the same Predator Wolverine fought in 1900, who now has four additional Yautja to aid him. Despite losing Kruel and Jackson, Wolverine, Maverick, and Sabretooth manage to take out over half of them before retreating into a nearby temple, where they decide to work together with the general leading the guerrilla force to defeat the aliens. They lure the hunters into the temple and place the Shuriken Logan took from his first battle in a room filled with explosives. As Logan and Team X lie to Professor Thorton about the general's fate, the original Predator is shown to have survived the explosion.

The Predator later breaks into the Weapon X facility just after Wolverine's skeleton is bonded to adamantium. Learning of the material's indestructible properties, the Predator sees Logan as a valuable trophy and takes him to his ship after pouring acid on his face. Fighter pilots are sent after the alien's ship to retrieve Logan, who manages to wake up and escape after the vessel is hit with a missile just before he's taken into space. While recovering Wolverine's body, Thorton comes across the Predator's helmet, which he studies and uses as an inspiration when developing the Weapon X helmet to control Logan.

During his time in Japan studying under the legendary swordsmith Muramasa, Logan is attacked once again by the Predator, now wearing the skull of the bear it killed in Alaska. Muramasa challenges Wolverine to duel the alien using a sword, which he obliges to until it's blasted away. Just as he brings out his claws, the Predator retreats upon seeing Logan and Muramasa being approached by the Hand. In his early days with the X-Men, Wolverine gives himself up when the Predator threatens the students, but he is rescued by Dani, Nightcrawler, Kitty, and Rogue before the Predator uses his cloaking device to escape.

In the present day, Wolverine lures the Predator for a final showdown in the Canadian wilderness by putting his helmet on a stake. To give the alien a false sense of confidence and his own personal pride, Logan gets himself hurt and allows the Predator to retrieve his helmet. After narrowly avoiding him in the water, Wolverine tricks the hunter by placing one of his eyeballs in the mud on the side of the river and critically wounds him. He and the Predator mercilessly stab each other one last time before the Yautja activates the self-destruct mechanism in his wristband, intending to take Wolverine with him. Logan recovers from the explosion days later, admitting he'll miss his opponent, before observing the ceremonial dagger the Predator left behind.

=== Predator vs. Black Panther ===
In the Wolf Star System, a planet ruled by a Predator King featured two rival clans led by his sons. The older, named Graveyard, was tall and strong, while the younger was small and missing a leg. The one-legged Yautja challenged his older brother's clan to a blood hunt, but lost as his father lent his vibranium spear to his brother to overpower them. Rather than giving him an honorable death, Graveyard humiliated his younger sibling by tying him to a totem and abandoning him, but he escaped thanks to his implanted wrist blades. Believing vibranium weaponry is the key to defeating Graveyard and restoring his honor, the younger prince takes his clan to Earth and tracks the source to the hidden nation of Wakanda.

After training with the Dora Milaje and the Hatut Zeraze, T'Challa is brought to a series of waterfalls outside of Wakanda's capital by his sister, Shuri. She introduces him to Maji Kina, a seer from the River Tribe, and shows him the seer's visions of suffering around the planet to convince him to share more of their vibranium to help the world's problems, but he refuses. The Yautja manage to bypass Wakanda's shields via hacking and the prince decides to lead his men in a hunt against Black Panther upon seeing his vibranium suit. Sensing something is wrong after observing the wildlife, T'Challa quickly leaves the waterfall and attempts to warn Okoye, but finds his communication line is jammed. He is then shot in the head by one of the Yautja and falls unconscious in the swamp below.

As Shuri and Maji leave Wakanda's perimeter to defy her brother and deliver vibranium, the control station is taken over by the Yautja, and Shuri's ship is destroyed when she attempts to return. Black Panther awakens to find the Dora Milaje in the midst of a bloody battle with the aliens and assists them, killing several hunters with Okoye as they reunite with the surviving warriors and the Hatut Zeraze. He deduces the Predators have come for their vibranium and leads them to the source, the Great Mound. While he was unconscious, T'Challa visited the ancestral plane and spoke to his grandfather, Azzuri. Azzuri reveals Wakanda waged a bloody war against the Yautja in the past. The alien's technology would inspire the nation's perimeter shield and would push Azzuri and his successors into making Wakanda more isolated from sharing vibranium with the world.

Outside Wakanda's border, Shuri is attacked by a Yautja scout when she attempts to hack the perimeter. Thanks to Maji sacrificing himself, she is able to break free of the alien's grasp and sends out a call for help while dueling the Predator. After defeating the hunter, she takes his helmet to observe its technology and is approached by Falcon, who responded to her distress call. She uses the helmet to hack them back into the perimeter and instructs Falcon to fly them into the sky. Black Panther, Okoye, and the leader of the Hatut Zeraze, Akili, split up in the Great Mound to attempt to surprise the Yautja, but a guard that survived T'Challa's attack warned them of their approach, resulting in the deaths of Akili and several more soldiers.

After he and Okoye kill several more Predators, Black Panther ends up face-to-face with the prince, who removes his mask. Sensing he wants an honorable duel, T'Challa removes his armor and engages him in a battle of vibranium spears. When his opponent bests him, the prince cowardly uses his implanted wrist blades to cut off T'Challa's right leg and retreat with the vibranium his clan had stolen. As the Predators attempt to escape, Shuri manages to blow up their ship thanks to stealing her attacker's self-destruct wristband earlier with Falcon's help. While the blast killed the younger prince and his clan on board, the vibranium survived and was retrieved by the Predator King and his Graveyard, who plan to use it to upgrade their arsenal.

=== Predator vs. Spider-Man ===
During a massive heat wave in New York, Spider-Man infiltrates NYPD Detective LaPearl's crime scene with three skinned corpses that each had a body part taken and reports his findings to J. Jonah Jameson. Before he can make it to the Daily Bugle, he rescues some kids from being run over from a group of robbers that end up being killed by the culprit, a ruthless Predator with no sense of honor that wears the skins of its victims on its face. New York experiences a city-wide blackout due to the residents pushing the power grid to its limits from the heat. Unable to report his findings online, Peter suggests to Jameson that they publish their story on "The Skinner" in the newspaper and hand them out on the streets to warn everyone. The paper sells well; however, word reaches out not just to the irate LaPearl, but also to Kraven the Hunter.

Peter goes to his apartment to talk to his girlfriend, Mary Jane Watson, but unbeknownst to him, MJ was on the subway when the blackout occurred. Skinner attacks the train, and she and another female passenger manage to escape in the tunnels, where a local hobo takes them to the killer's lair. LaPearl confronts Peter at his home, and he informs her about the second crime scene he did not report before he swings over to the New York Public Library to research Skinner's attack patterns and calling card. Kraven arrives at the second crime scene before LaPearl, observing the killer's techniques and a trap Spider-Man set up. He knocks LaPearl into the trap and is determined to hunt Skinner before Spider-Man catches the alien. Peter tells Jameson he learned that Skinner's style of killings has been going on all over the world for centuries, and the murders typically happen during dangerously hot days.

As the power is restored to the city, Peter's spider-sense goes off as he sees a flock of pigeons fly away from something. It turns out to be a cloaked ship from a group of Yautja who came to Earth hunting for the rogue Skinner after Peter saved pictures of the crime scenes to the Daily Bugle cloud. Peter gets Jameson to safety before battling the three Predators as Spider-Man. One of the aliens is knocked out of the building and lands next to LaPearl and Jameson. Kraven shuts down the power in the city once more to make sure the news about Skinner doesn't reach the Avengers and that he can hunt down the Predator himself.

The hobo sacrifices himself and helps MJ and her companion hide from Skinner by pushing her into a pit of rats. Before the killer can pursue them, it is alerted by the presence of the other Yautja and retreats, sparing the two women. Skinner impales the Yautja that landed in the street as Spider-Man is blasted out of the building by the other Predators. As Skinner prepares to destroy the hunting party's ship, he is confronted by Kraven. The two hunters engage in a brutal duel that ends with Kraven emerging victorious. Kraven then finds that Skinner had activated his self-destruct wristband before he died and gives it to Spider-Man to dispose of, who has mere seconds to swing the bomb out into the water away from the civilians.

Jameson and LaPearl are disappointed they don't have footage of the aliens for their careers before discovering that the Predator Skinner stabbed earlier survived and is being taken by Dr. Cornelius for experimentation. Kraven is confronted by the remaining Yautja. Rather than kill him, the Predators carve Skinner's brand into his forehead. The aliens deem him a worthy hunter and invite him to join their ranks, which he accepts. Spider-Man is revealed to have survived the explosion and embraces MJ as Kraven and the Yautja leave Earth.

=== Predator Kills the Marvel Universe ===
Nearly a year after the events of Predator vs. Spider-Man, the Guardians of the Galaxy respond to a distress signal from a Stark Industries mining ship near Saturn. It turns out to be a trap set by Kraven and the Yautja, who slaughter Star-Lord and his teammates. With Earth being one of the few habitable planets in the solar system, the Predator King plans to conquer the world by hunting down their most powerful warriors. Kraven provides them with a kill list on all of Earth's greatest heroes and villains that they need to track down, though he requests to kill Spider-Man personally.

Their first targets are the Fantastic Four, who are on patrol at their lunar base. Using their upgraded vibranium weaponry, they cut off Mister Fantastic's left arm and behead the Human Torch. After Kraven warns his comrades of the Thing's strength, the Predator Prince uses his vibranium club to blast Ben Grimm off into space. Reed warns his wife, Sue Storm, the Invisible Woman, of the aliens' vibranium weaponry before he dies from blood loss.

Kraven instructs the Yautja to launch an all out blitz on Earth with forces divided between him and Graveyard. Graveyard leads his troops to the X-Mansion, where they use a vibranium inversion magnet to tear apart Magneto before attacking the X-Men in the Danger Room. Kraven's forces use the Milano to pose as the Guardians so they could infiltrate Avengers Tower and ambush Captain America, Black Widow, and Hawkeye. After their defeat, Kraven lures the Hulk outside and uses a vibranium device to drain his gamma energy, killing him shortly after he becomes Bruce Banner again.

Wolverine arrives at the X-Mansion only to find it burning to the ground with Professor X and most of the X-Men dead. Nightcrawler rescues him before Graveyard could execute them. The Predator King then sends various drones to destroy Earth's major communication, energy, and data plants, leaving humanity vulnerable. The Yautja use their technology and tactics to slaughter countless heroes and villains, including Thor, who is shot with a vibranium bullet with a gravity well that sinks him to the Earth's core. Wolverine and Nightcrawler are nearly killed by Graveyard, but are rescued by Spider-Man and Iron Man.

Meanwhile, Dr. Cornelius has used similar technology used in the Weapon X program to enhance and put the Yautja he captured under his control, calling him "Predator X". When U.S. Army General Charlotte Pett learns from her intel that the Yautja are being led by Kraven, Cornelius sends Predator X behind enemy lines, where he successfully kills the hunter.

Tony equips Spider-Man and Wolverine with vibranium camouflage armors so the three of them can take on the hunters. Wolverine faces off against Graveyard. During their fight, Sue kills the Predator King and sacrifices herself to destroy the core reactor on the moon, destroying the Yautja's base and any stationed there. The brief distraction it provided Graveyard gave Logan the opening he needed to land the killing blow, brutally slaughtering him to avenge Xavier and the other fallen X-Men.

Black Panther arrives with Shuri and Falcon to New York and assist the remaining heroes with putting an end to the Yautja's threat to humanity. After confirming Kraven's death and seeing the chaos settle down, Pett orders Cornelius to decommission Predator X, but he refuses and reveals he implanted the Yautja's blade in his wrist.

== Publication history ==
In July 2020, Marvel Comics was announced to be developing a new line of Predator comic books to release in 2021, with a "First Look" by David Finch featuring a Yautja (Predator) standing atop the Fantastic Four's Baxter Building, who stated that "I cannot wait to see the [Predator] wreaking havoc in the Marvel Universe". In May 2022, a series of variant covers depicting Marvel characters encountering Yautja were published, including two featuring a Yautja and Wolverine. In June 2023, Predator vs. Wolverine was announced, written by Ben Percy and illustrated by Greg Land, Andrea Di Vito, and Ken Lashley.

The four-issue series was published from September 20 to December 27, 2023. A follow-up, Predator vs. Black Panther was announced in June 2024, and was published from August 21 to November 20, 2024. At the conclusion of that series, Predator vs Spider-Man was announced, and was published from April 23 to July 16, 2025, in-turn followed by Predator Kills the Marvel Universe.
