= Marvel Zombies: War Zone =

Upcoming comic book series by Marvel Comics

Publication information
- Publisher: Marvel Comics
- Schedule: Monthly
- Format: Limited series
- Genre: Horror; Superhero; Zombie apocalypse
- Publication date: September 2, 2026
- No. of issues: 5
- Main character: Punisher

Creative team
- Written by: Tom Waltz
- Artist: Jaime Infante

Marvel Zombies: War Zone is an American comic book series published by Marvel Comics, as part of the Marvel Zombies metaseries. The five-issue limited series–written by Tom Waltz and illustrated by Jaime Infante begin publication on September 2, 2026.

== Premise ==
On Earth-4775, a zombie outbreak has hit Manhattan, and the entire city is quickly overrun. As Earth's mightiest heroes, including the Avengers succumb to the virus, a barrier is hastily erected around the city to prevent the infection from spreading to the rest of the world. Inside the barrier, a war zone has broken out, with survivors fighting for their lives against the ever-growing horde. The Punisher joins forces with Luke Cage, Elektra, Iron Fist, Moon Knight, and other street-level heroes to uncover the plague's origin and find a way to stop it before the outbreak spreads beyond the city's borders.

== Publication history ==
In June 2026, Marvel Comics announced a five-issue comic book limited series titled Marvel Zombies: War Zone, as part of the Marvel Zombies metaseries, with Tom Waltz as writer and Jaime Infante as artist. It is scheduled to begin publication on September 2, 2026.

=== Issues ===
Issue	Publication date	Ref.
#1	September 2, 2026	
#2	October 21, 2026	
#3	November 25, 2026	
#4	December 9, 2026	
