= Benjamin Percy =

American writer

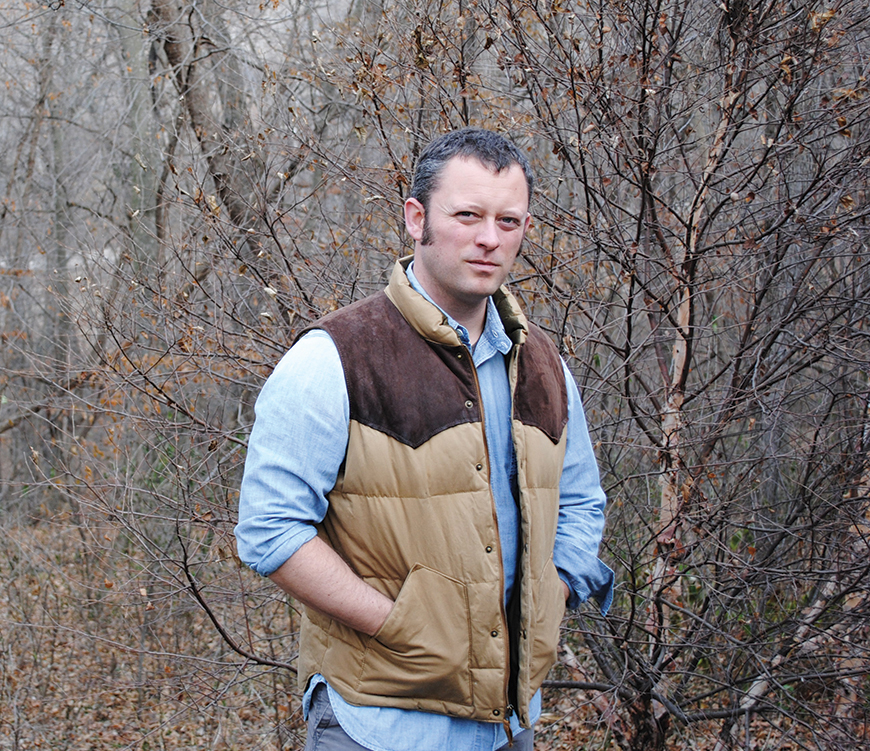
- Percy in 2013
- Education: Brown University; Southern Illinois University
- Spouse: Lisa Percy
- Relatives: Jennifer Percy (sister)
- Writing career
- Genres: Novel, Short Story
- Website: Official website

Benjamin Percy is an American author of novels and short stories, essayist, comic book writer, and screenwriter.

== Career ==
Benjamin Percy has published four novels, The Dark Net, The Dead Lands, Red Moon, and The Wilding, as well as two books of short fiction: Refresh, Refresh and The Language of Elk. In 2016, he published his first book of non-fiction, a collection of essays on writing and genre fiction: Thrill Me.

Percy's first work for DC Comics was writing Detective Comics #35 – 36 in 2014, which was part of the company's New 52 branding. He eventually took over as writer on the company's Green Arrow series, beginning with issue 41, and continuing until issue 52, when that series was cancelled in preparation for DC's 2016 DC Rebirth initiative, which involved restarting its monthly titles with new #1 issues. Percy would continue as writer on Green Arrow with its new series in 2016, beginning with the one-shot Green Arrow: Rebirth, which sold over 90,000 copies when it was released in May 2016. It was the highest-selling issue with Green Arrow as the main character in recent comics history, and received a second-printing. In comparison, the final issues of the previous Green Arrow series sold between 21,000 and 22,000 copies, the last Green Arrow #1, from the New 52 launch, sold 55,512 copies, and Kevin Smith's Green Arrow #1 from 2001 sold 85,046 copies.

Since 2019, Percy has written numerous series for Marvel Comics, including X-Force, Wolverine, Ghost Rider, Predator vs. Wolverine, Predator vs. Black Panther, Predator vs. Spider-Man, and Predator Kills the Marvel Universe.

In 2025, Percy began publishing The End Times, a serial novel told in newspapers, co-written with Stephen King and set in the world of King's 1978 novel The Stand.

== Bibliography ==
=== Books ===
==== Collections ====
- The Language of Elk (2006)
- Refresh, Refresh (2007)
- Thrill Me: Essays on Fiction (2016)
- Suicide Woods (2019)

==== Novels ====
- The Wilding (2010)
- Red Moon (2013)
- The Dead Lands (2015)
- The Dark Net (2017)
- The Ninth Metal (2021)
- The Unfamiliar Garden (2022)
- The Sky Vault (2023)
- The End Times (with Stephen King) (2025-)

=== Comics ===
AWA Studios

- Year Zero #1–5 (with Ramon Rosanas, April 2020–present)
- Devil's Highway #1–5 (with Brent Schoonover, July 2020–)

DC Comics

- Detective Comics #35–36 (2014) "Terminal" (with John Paul Leon)
  - Volume 7: Anarky (hc, 176 pages, 2016) collects
- Green Arrow Volume 6 #41–52 (with Patrick Zircher, 2015–2016)
- Green Arrow: Rebirth #1 (with Otto Schmidt, August 2016)
- Green Arrow Volume 7 #1–38 (with Otto Schmidt and Juan Ferreyra, August 2016 – March 2018)
- Teen Titans Volume 6 #1–20 (with Jonboy Meyers, Wade Von Grawbadger, and Khoi Pham, November 2016 – July 2018)
  - Teen Titans Volume 1: Damian Knows Best (collecting Teen Titans (vol. 6) #1–5, Teen Titans: Rebirth #1, TPB, 144 pages, 2017)
  - Teen Titans Volume 2: The Rise of Aqualad (collecting Teen Titans (vol. 6) #6–7, 9–11, TPB, 128 pages, 2018)
  - Teen Titans Volume 3: The Return of Kid Flash (collecting Teen Titans (vol. 6) #13–19, Holiday Spirit (DC Holiday Special 2017 #1), TPB, 152 pages, 2018)
- Nightwing Volume 4 #44–50 (with Chris Mooneyham and Amancay Nahuelpan, 2018)

Dynamite Entertainment

- James Bond: Black Box #1–6 (with Rapha Lobosco, 2017)
  - James Bond: Black Box (hc, 176 pages, 2017) collects

Marvel Comics

- Ghost Rider Volume 10 #1–21, Annual #1 (with Cory Smith, 2022–2023)
  - Ghost Rider Vol 1.: Unchained (collecting Ghost Rider (Series 10) #1–5, TPB, 144 pages, 2022, ISBN 1-302-92782-5)
  - Ghost Rider Vol 1.: Shadow Country (collecting Ghost Rider (Series 10) #6–10, TPB, 160 pages, 2023, ISBN 1-302-94797-4)
- X-Force (vol. 6) #1–50 (with Joshua Cassara 2019–2024)
  - X-Force by Benjamin Percy: Volume 1 (collecting X-Force (vol. 6) #1–6, TPB, 176 pages, 2020, ISBN 1-302-91988-1)
  - X-Force by Benjamin Percy: Volume 2 (collecting X-Force (vol. 6) #7–12, TPB, 136 pages, 2020, ISBN 1-302-91989-X)
- Weapon Plus: World War IV #1 (with Georges Jeanty and Rachelle Rosenberg, 2020)
- Wolverine (vol. 7) #1–50 (with Adam Kubert & Viktor Bogdanovic, 2020–2024)
  - Wolverine by Benjamin Percy: Volume 1 (collecting Wolverine (vol. 7) #1–3, TPB, 136 pages, 2020, ISBN 1-302-92182-7)
- Wolverine: The Long Night Adaptation #1–5 (with Marcio Takara, 2019)
  - Wolverine: The Long Night (collecting Wolverine: The Long Night Adaptation #1-5, TPB, 120 pages, 2018)
- Marvel Comics Presents Vol. 3 #4
- Empyre: X-Men #2
- Marauders #14–15
- Predator vs. Wolverine #1–4 (with Greg Land, Ken Lashey, Andrea Di Vito, Hayden Sherman, Juan Fernandez, Kei Zama, & Gavin Guidry, 2023–2024)
  - Predator vs. Wolverine (collecting Predator vs. Wolverine #1–4, TPB, 128 pages, 2024)
- Predator vs. Black Panther #1–4 (with Lee Ferguson, Chris Allen, & Sean Damien Hill, 2024)
  - Predator vs. Black Panther (collecting Predator vs. Black Panther #1–4, TPB, 112 pages, 2025)
- Carnage: Black, White & Blood #1
- Aliens: Aftermath #1
- Moon Knight: Black White & Blood #2
- Ghost Rider: Vengeance Forever #1
- Edge of Spider-Verse Vol. 3 #2
- Ghost Rider/Wolverine: Weapons of Vengeance Alpha #1
- Ghost Rider/Wolverine: Weapons of Vengeance Omega #1
- Ghost Rider: Final Vengeance #1-6
- Star Wars: Darth Maul - Black, White & Red #1
- Hellverine #1-4
- The Incredible Hulk Vol. 4 #19
- Crypt of Shadows Vol. 5 #1
- Hellverine Vol. 2 #1-10
- Deadpool/Wolverine #1-10
- Red Hulk #1-10
- Predator vs. Spider-Man
- Predator Kills the Marvel Universe #1–4
- Punisher Red Band #1-5
- Punisher #1-present
- Wade Wilson: Deadpool #1-present
- Midnight Fantastic Four #1-present

=== Short fiction ===
Title	Year	First published	Reprinted/collected
"Refresh, Refresh"	2005	Percy, Benjamin (2005). "Refresh, Refresh". The Paris Review. 175.	Percy, Benjamin (2007). Refresh, Refresh. Graywolf Press. ISBN 978-1-55597-485-5.
"Writs of Possession"	2011	Percy, Benjamin (Spring 2011). "Writs of Possession". Virginia Quarterly Review. 87 (2).	Henderson, Bill, ed. (2013). ""Writs of Possession"". The Pushcart Prize XXXVII : best of the small presses 2013. Pushcart Press. pp. 217–231.

=== Scripts ===
Podcasts

- Wolverine: The Long Night
- Wolverine: The Lost Trail
- Wastelanders: Old Man Star-Lord

Preceded by Paul Cornell	Wolverine writer 2020–2024	Succeeded by Saladin Ahmed
