= Ongoing series =

Comic series that runs indefinitely

In comics, an ongoing series is a series that runs indefinitely, i.e. a series with an unknown limit. This is different from a limited series (a series intended to end after a certain number of issues thus limited, i.e. a series with a known limit), a one shot (a comic book which is not a part of an ongoing series), a trade paperback, or a graphic novel, although a series of graphic novels may be considered ongoing as well. The term may also informally refer to a current or incomplete limited series with a predetermined number of issues.

== Characteristics ==
An ongoing series is traditionally published on a fixed schedule, typically monthly or bimonthly but many factors can cause an issue to be published late. In the past, the schedule was often maintained with the use of fill-in issues (usually by a different creative team, sometimes hurting quality), but increasingly the practice has been to simply delay publication.

An ongoing "might run for decades and hundreds of issues or be canceled after only a handful of issues". When an ongoing series ceases to be published because the story has ended, it may be called "finished". If it ceases to be published because of low sales, editorial decisions, publisher bankruptcy, or other reasons, it is "cancelled". An ending might be written for the last issues of a cancelled series, or the series may simply disappear without warning and never return.

If a series ceases to be published, but may be published again, it is called "on hiatus". Many series are placed "on hiatus" but do not return even after several years.

For series that are creator owned, the copyright holder has the option of approaching other publishers to see if they would be open to resuming the title under their imprint. For instance, Usagi Yojimbo has had four consecutive publishers.

== Examples ==
=== Examples of ongoing series ===
- Action Comics; "a series that has been published nearly continuously since 1938".
- Detective Comics; the first volume was published from 1937 to 2011 and then later continued in 2016. The series published 881 issues between 1937 and 2011 and is the longest continuously published comic book in the United States.

=== Examples of limited series ===
- 52

=== Examples of finished series ===
- Y: The Last Man
- Cerebus the Aardvark
- The Sandman
- Preacher
- God Is Dead
- The Walking Dead
- Lumberjanes; originally planned as an eight-part limited series, the comic was made an ongoing series following strong sales and critical acclaim. The comic series came to a close after 75 issues with a one-shot finale in December 2020, ending its six-year-run.
- Mickey Mouse; a Disney comic book series that first appeared in 1943 as part of the Four Color one-shot series. It received its own numbering system with issue #28 (December 1952), and after many iterations with various publishers, ended with #330 (June 2017) from IDW Publishing.
- Invincible

=== Examples of cancelled series ===
- Slingers
- Justice League International
- Dungeons & Dragons: Fell's Five

=== Examples of relaunched series ===
- Superman (at least one relaunch in 1987 and 2011)
- The Amazing Spider-Man (relaunched in 1999 and re-numbered to original numbering beginning with #59 (500))
- Fantastic Four (relaunched in 1996 and again in 1997 as well as 2012)
- Avengers (relaunched in 1996, 1997, 2010 and 2012)
- Fallen Angel (cancelled by DC Comics, subsequently relaunched by IDW Publishing)

== See also ==
- History of comics
- History of manga
- List of current Marvel Comics publications
- List of current DC Comics publications
