= Midnight X-Men =

2026 comic book series by Marvel Comics

- Cover of Midnight X-Men #1 (October 2026). Art by Dike Ruan.

Publication information
- Publisher: Marvel Comics
- Schedule: Monthly
- Format: Ongoing series
- Genre: Horror; Superhero; Vampire
- Publication date: October 7, 2026 –
- Main character: X-Men

Creative team
- Written by: Jonathan Hickman
- Artist: Matteo Della Fonte

Midnight X-Men is a 2026 American horror-superhero-vampire comic book series published by Marvel Comics, based on the superhero team the X-Men. Written by Jonathan Hickman and illustrated by Matteo Della Fonte, it is one of the first three titles under Marvel's Midnight Universe imprint, which began an ongoing run on October 7, 2026.

== Premise ==
Midnight X-Men focuses on the conflict between ordinary vampires and mutant vampires known as "empyres".

== Characters ==
Characters who appeared in Midnight X-Men include Gambit, Storm, Nightcrawler, Cyclops, Iceman, Jean Grey, Magneto, Scarlet Witch, Quicksilver, Polaris, and Havok.

== Publication history ==
In mid-May 2026, Marvel Comics announced the ongoing comic book series Midnight X-Men as one of the first three titles under the publisher's then-recently announced Midnight Universe imprint, with Jonathan Hickman as writer and Matteo Della Fonte as illustrator. Midnight X-Men was originally scheduled to begin publication in August, but had its release date changed in June, before it officially debuted on October 7.

=== Issues ===
Issue	Publication date	Ref.
#1	October 7, 2026	
#2	November 18, 2026	

== See also ==
- Bloodstorm, the name typically given to Storm's vampiric alternate universe counterparts in X-Men comics.
- "Blood Hunt", a Marvel Comics storyline focused on vampires.
