= List of Marvel Comics publications (F–G) =

Marvel Comics is an American comic book company dating to 1961. This is a list of the publications it has released in its history under the "Marvel Comics" imprint. The list does not include collected editions; trade paperbacks; digital comics; free, promotional giveaways; sketchbooks; poster books or magazines, nor does it include series published by other Marvel imprints such as Epic, Icon or Star. It also does not include titles published by Marvel's pre-1961 predecessors Timely Comics and Atlas Comics.

- List of Marvel Comics publications (A)
- List of Marvel Comics publications (B–C)
- List of Marvel Comics publications (D–E)
- List of Marvel Comics publications (H–L)
- List of Marvel Comics publications (M)
- List of Marvel Comics publications (N–R)
- List of Marvel Comics publications (S)
- List of Marvel Comics publications (T–V)
- List of Marvel Comics publications (W–Z)

== F ==
Title	Series	Issues	Dates	Notes	Reference
Factor-X		#1–4	Mar 1995 – Jun 1995	limited series; Age of Apocalypse (1995) tie-in	
Falcon	vol. 1	#1–4	Nov 1983 – Feb 1984	limited series	
Falcon	vol. 2	#1–8	Dec 2017 – Jul 2018		
Falcon & Winter Soldier		#1–5	Apr 2020 – Jan 2021	limited series	
Fall of the House of X		#1–5	Mar 2024 – Jul 2024	limited series	
Fall of the Hulks	Alpha	#1	Feb 2010	one-shot	
Fall of the Hulks	Gamma	#1	Feb 2010	one-shot	
Fall of the Hulks	Red Hulk	#1–4	Mar 2010 – Jun 2010	limited series	
Fall of the Hulks	The Savage She-Hulks	#1–3	May 2010 – Jul 2010	limited series	
The Fall of Ultraman		#1	Apr 2026	one-shot	
Fallen Angels	vol. 1	#1–8	Apr 1987 – Nov 1987	limited series	
Fallen Angels	vol. 2	#1–6	Jan 2020 – Mar 2020		
Fallen Friend		#1	Sep 2023	one-shot	
Fallen Son: The Death of Captain America		#1–5	Jun 2007 – Aug 2007	limited series	
Fantastic 4th Voyage of Sinbad		#1	Sep 2001	one-shot	
Fantastic Five	vol. 1	#1–5	Oct 1999 – Feb 2000		
Fantastic Five	vol. 2	#1–5	Sep 2007 – Nov 2007	limited series	
Fantastic Force	vol. 1	#1–18	Nov 1994 – Apr 1996		
Fantastic Force	vol. 2	#1–4	Jun 2009 – Sep 2009	limited series	
Fantastic Four	vol. 1	#1–416	Nov 1961 – Sep 1996		
Fantastic Four	vol. 1	Annual #1–27	1963 – 1994		
Fantastic Four	vol. 1	Giant-Size #1–6	May 1974 – Oct 1975	first issue titled Giant-Size Super-Stars	
Fantastic Four	vol. 2	#1–13	Nov 1996 – Nov 1997		
Fantastic Four	vol. 3	#1–79; 509–588	Jan 1998 – Apr 2011	issues #42-79 are dual numbered as #471–508	
Fantastic Four	vol. 3	Fantastic Four/Fantastic 4 '98	1998	Annual	
Fantastic Four	vol. 3	1999, 2000, 2001	1999 – 2001	Annuals	
Fantastic Four	vol. 3	Annual #32	Aug 2010		
Fantastic Four	vol. 3	Special #1	Feb 2006		
Fantastic Four	vol. 4	#600–611; 605.1	Jan 2012 – Dec 2012		
Fantastic Four	vol. 4	Annual #33	Sep 2012		
Fantastic Four	vol. 5	#1–16 #5AU	Jan 2013 – Mar 2014		
Fantastic Four	vol. 6	#1–14; 642–645	Apr 2014 – Jun 2015	issues renumbered after #14 to #642	
Fantastic Four	vol. 6	Annual #1	Dec 2014		
Fantastic Four	vol. 7	#1–48	Oct 2018 – Dec 2022		
Fantastic Four	vol. 8	#1–33	Jan 2023 – Aug 2025		
Fantastic Four	vol. 8	Annual #1	2023		
Fantastic Four	vol. 9	#1–	Sep 2025 – present		
Fantastic Four	1234	#1–4	Oct 2001 – Jan 2002	limited series	
Fantastic Four	4 Yancy Street	#1	Oct 2019	one-shot	
Fantastic Four	65 Years of the World's Greatest Comic Covers	#1	Oct 2026	one-shot	
Fantastic Four	A Death in the Family	#1	Jul 2006	one-shot	
Fantastic Four	Anniversary Tribute	#1	Jan 2022	one-shot	
Fantastic Four	Antithesis	#1–4	Oct 2020 – Jan 2021	limited series	
Fantastic Four	Atlantis Rising	#1–2	Jun 1995 – Jul 1995	limited series	
Fantastic Four	Cosmic-Size Special	#1	Feb 2009	one-shot	
Fantastic Four	Fanfare	#1–4	Jul 2025 – Oct 2025	limited series	
Fantastic Four	Fireworks	#1–3	Jan 1999 – Mar 1999	limited series	
Fantastic Four	First Family	#1–6	May 2006 – Oct 2006	limited series	
Fantastic Four	First Steps	#1	Sep 2025	one-shot; movie tie-in	
Fantastic Four	Foes	#1–6	Mar 2005 – Aug 2005	limited series	
Fantastic Four	Giant-Size Adventures	#1	Aug 2009	one-shot	
Fantastic Four	Grand Design	#1–2	Dec 2019 – Jan 2020	limited series	
Fantastic Four	Grimm Noir	#1	Apr 2020	one-shot	
Fantastic Four	House of M	#1–3	Sep 2005 – Nov 2005	limited series	
Fantastic Four	¡Isla De La Muerte!	#1	Feb 2008	one-shot	
Fantastic Four	Life Story	#1–6	Jul 2021 – Apr 2022	limited series	
Fantastic Four	Negative Zone	#1	Jan 2020	one-shot	
Fantastic Four	Reckoning War Alpha	#1	Apr 2022	one-shot	
Fantastic Four	Road Trip	#1	Feb 2021	one-shot	
Fantastic Four	Roast	#1	May 1982	one-shot	
Fantastic Four	Special Edition	#1	May 1984	one-shot	
Fantastic Four	The End	#1–6	Jan 2007 – May 2007	limited series	
Fantastic Four	The Legend	#1	Oct 1996	one-shot	
Fantastic Four	The Lost Adventure	#1	Apr 2008	one-shot	
Fantastic Four	The Movie	#1	Aug 2005	one-shot; adaptation of the 2005 film	
Fantastic Four	The Wedding Special	#1	Jan 2006	one-shot	
Fantastic Four	True Story	#1–4	Sep 2008 – Jan 2009	limited series	
Fantastic Four	Unlimited	#1–12	Mar 1993 – Dec 1995		
Fantastic Four	Unplugged	#1–6	Sep 1995 – Jul 1996	limited series	
Fantastic Four	Wedding Special	#1	Feb 2019	one-shot	
Fantastic Four	World's Greatest Comics Magazine	#1–12	Feb 2001 – Jan 2002	limited series	
Fantastic Four 2099	vol. 1	#1–8	Jan 1996 – Aug 1996		
Fantastic Four 2099	vol. 2	#1	Jan 2020	one-shot	
The Fantastic Four: First Foes		#1	May 2026	one-shot; movie tie-in	
The Fantastic Four: First Foes	Dragon Man	#1	Nov 2026	one-shot; movie tie-in	
The Fantastic Four: First Foes	Shalla-Bal	#1	Sep 2026	one-shot; movie tie-in	
Fantastic Four/Gargoyles		#1	Dec 2025	one-shot	
Fantastic Four/Iron Man: Big in Japan		#1–4	Dec 2005 – Mar 2006	limited series	
Fantastic Four and Power Pack		#1–4	Sep 2007 – Dec 2007	limited series	
Fantastic Four Presents Franklin Richards		#1	Nov 2005	one-shot	
Fantastic Four vs. X-Men		#1–4	Feb 1987 – Jun 1987	limited series	
Fantasy Masterpieces	vol. 1	#1–11	Feb 1966 – Oct 1967	continued as Marvel Super-Heroes vol. 1	
Fantasy Masterpieces	vol. 2	#1–14	Dec 1979 – Jan 1981		
Fantomex Max		#1–4	Dec 2013 – Mar 2014	limited series	
Fear		#1–31	Nov 1970 – Dec 1975	also known as Adventure into Fear	
Fear Itself		#1–7	Jun 2011 – Dec 2011	limited series	
Fear Itself	Black Widow	#1	Aug 2011	one-shot	
Fear Itself	Book of the Skull	#1	May 2011	one-shot	
Fear Itself	Captain America	#7.1	Jan 2012	one-shot	
Fear Itself	Deadpool	#1–3	Aug 2011 – Oct 2011	limited series	
Fear Itself	Fearsome Four	#1–4	Aug 2011 – Nov 2011	limited series	
Fear Itself	Fellowship of Fear	#1	Oct 2011	one-shot	
Fear Itself	FF	#1	Sep 2011	one-shot	
Fear Itself	Hulk vs. Dracula	#1–3	Nov 2011 – Dec 2011	limited series	
Fear Itself	Iron Man	#7.3	Jan 2012	one-shot	
Fear Itself	Monkey King	#1	Nov 2011	one-shot	
Fear Itself	Sin's Past	#1	Jun 2011	one-shot	
Fear Itself	Spider-Man	#1–3	Jul 2011 – Sep 2011	limited series	
Fear Itself	Spotlight		Jun 2011	one-shot	
Fear Itself	The Deep	#1–4	Aug 2011 – Nov 2011	limited series	
Fear Itself	The Fearless	#1–12	Dec 2011 – Jun 2012	limited series	
Fear Itself	The Home Front	#1–7	Jun 2011 – Dec 2011	limited series	
Fear Itself	The Worthy	#1	Sep 2011	one-shot	
Fear Itself	Thor	#7.2	Jan 2012	one-shot	
Fear Itself	Uncanny X-Force	#1–3	Sep 2011 – Nov 2011	limited series	
Fear Itself	Wolverine	#1–3	Sep 2011 – Nov 2011	limited series	
Fear Itself	Youth in Revolt	#1–6	Jul 2011 – Dec 2011	limited series	
Fearless		#1–4	Sep 2019 – Dec 2019	limited series	
Fearless Defenders		#1–12 #4AU	Apr 2013 – Feb 2014		
Felicia Hardy: The Black Cat		#1–4	Jul 1994 – Oct 1994	limited series	
FF	vol. 1	#1–23	May 2011 – Dec 2012		
FF	vol. 2	#1–16	Jan 2013 – Mar 2014		
FF	Fifty Fantastic Years	#1	Nov 2011	one-shot; also known as Fantastic Four: Fifty Fantastic Years	
Fight Man		#1	Jun 1993	one-shot	
Fin Fang Four Return!		#1	Jul 2009	one-shot	
Firestar	vol. 1	#1–4	Mar 1986 – Jun 1986	limited series	
Firestar	vol. 2	#1	Jun 2010	one-shot	
First X-Men		#1–5	Oct 2012 – Jan 2013	limited series	
Fish Police		#1–6	Oct 1992 – Mar 1993	limited series	
Flash Gordon		#1–2	Jun 1995 – Jul 1995	limited series	
The Flintstones		#1–9	Oct 1977 – Feb 1979		
Foolkiller	vol. 1	#1–10	Oct 1990 – Oct 1991	limited series	
Foolkiller	vol. 2	#1–5	Dec 2007 – Jul 2008	limited series	
Foolkiller	vol. 3	#1–5	Jan 2017 – May 2017	limited series	
Foolkiller	White Angels	#1–5	Sep 2008 – Jan 2009	limited series	
Force Works		#1–22	Jul 1994 – Apr 1996		
Formic Wars	Burning Earth	#1–7	Apr 2011 – Sep 2011	limited series	
Formic Wars	Silent Strike	#1–5	Feb 2012 – Jun 2012	limited series	
Fortnite X Marvel: Zero War		#1–5	Aug 2022 – Nov 2022	limited series	
Four		#28–30	May 2006 – Jul 2006	continued from Marvel Knights 4	
Fraggle Rock	vol. 2	#1–5	Apr 1988 – Aug 1988	vol. 1 published under the Star Comics imprint	
Francis, Brother of the Universe		#1	1980	one-shot	
Franken-Castle		#17–21	Aug 2010 – Nov 2010	continued from Punisher vol. 8	
Frankenstein		#1–18	Jan 1973 – Sep 1975		
Franklin Richards		#1	Apr 2006	one-shot; sub-titled Everybody Loves Franklin	
Franklin Richards		April Fools	Jun 2009	one-shot	
Franklin Richards		Fall Football Fiasco!	Jan 2008	one-shot	
Franklin Richards		Happy Franksgiving!	Jan 2007	one-shot	
Franklin Richards		It's Dark Reigning Cats & Dogs	Apr 2009	one-shot	
Franklin Richards		March Madness	May 2007	one-shot	
Franklin Richards		Monster Mash	Nov 2007	one-shot	
Franklin Richards		Not-So-Secret Invasion	July 2008	one-shot	
Franklin Richards		School's Out	Sep 2009	one-shot	
Franklin Richards		Son of Geniuses	Jan 2009	one-shot	
Franklin Richards		Spring Break	May 2008	one-shot	
Franklin Richards		Summer Smackdown!	Oct 2008	one-shot	
Franklin Richards		Super Summer Spectacular	Sep 2006	one-shot	
Franklin Richards		World Be Warned	Aug 2007	one-shot	
Fred Hembeck Destroys the Marvel Universe		#1	Jul 1989	one-shot	
Fred Hembeck Sells the Marvel Universe		#1	Oct 1990	one-shot	
Freddy Krueger's A Nightmare on Elm Street		#1–2	Oct 1989 – Nov 1989		
Friendly Neighborhood Mary Jane		#1–5	Jan 2027 – present	limited series	
Friendly Neighborhood Spider-Man	vol. 1	#1–24	Dec 2005 – Nov 2007		
Friendly Neighborhood Spider-Man	vol. 1	Annual #1	Jul 2007		
Friendly Neighborhood Spider-Man	vol. 2	#1–14	Mar 2019 – Feb 2020		
From the Marvel Vault	The Defenders	#1	Sep 2011	one-shot	
From the Marvel Vault	Doctor Strange	#1	Apr 2011	one-shot	
From the Marvel Vault	Gambit and the Champions	#1	Oct 2011	one-shot	
From the Marvel Vault	Incredible Hulk & the Human Torch	#1	Aug 2011	one-shot	
From the Marvel Vault	Thunderbolts	#1	Jun 2011	one-shot	
Fun and Games Magazine		#1–13	Sep 1979 – Sep 1980		
The Funtastic World of Hanna-Barbera		#1–3	Dec 1977 – Jun 1978		
The Further Adventures of Cyclops and Phoenix		#1–4	Jun 1996 – Sep 1996	limited series	
The Further Adventures of Indiana Jones		#1–34	Jan 1983 – Mar 1986		
Fury	vol. 1	#1	May 1994	one-shot	
Fury	vol. 2	#1–6	Nov 2001 – Apr 2002	limited series	
Fury	vol. 3	#1	Jul 2023	one-shot	
Fury/Agent 13		#1–2	Jun 1998 – Jul 1998	limited series	
Fury/Black Widow: Death Duty			Feb 1995	one-shot	
Fury Max		#1–13	Jul 2012 – Aug 2013		
Fury of S.H.I.E.L.D.		#1–4	Apr 1995 – Jul 1995	limited series	
Fury: Peacemaker		#1–6	Apr 2006 – Sep 2006	limited series	
Fury: S.H.I.E.L.D. 50th Anniversary		#1	Nov 2015	one-shot	
Fusion		#1–3	May 2009 – Jul 2009	limited series; co-published with Top Cow Productions and Image Comics	
Future Fight Firsts	Crescent And Io	#1	Jan 2020	one-shot	
Future Fight Firsts	Luna Snow	#1	Dec 2019	one-shot	
Future Fight Firsts	White Fox	#1	Dec 2019	one-shot	
Future Foundation		#1–5	Oct 2019 – Feb 2020		
Future Imperfect		#1–5	Aug 2015 – Nov 2015	limited series; Secret Wars (2015) tie-in	

== G ==
Title	Series	Issues	Dates	Notes	Reference
G.I. Joe	A Real American Hero	#1–155	Jun 1982 – Dec 1994		
G.I. Joe	European Missions	#1–15	Jun 1988 – Aug 1989		
G.I. Joe	Order of Battle	#1–4	Nov 1986 – May 1987	limited series	
G.I. Joe	Special Missions	#1–28	Oct 1986 – Nov 1989		
G.I. Joe	Yearbook	#1–4	Mar 1985 – Feb 1988		
G.I. Joe and the Transformers		#1–4	Nov 1986 – Feb 1987	limited series	
G.L.A.		#1–4	Jun 2005 – Sep 2005	limited series	
G.O.D.S.		#1–8	Dec 2023 – Aug 2024	limited series	
G.O.D.S.	One World Under Doom	#1	Sep 2025	one-shot; One World Under Doom tie-in	
Galacta: Daughter of Galactus		#1	Jul 2010	one-shot	
Galactic Guardians		#1–4	Jul 1994 – Oct 1994	limited series	
Galactus the Devourer		#1–6	Sep 1999 – Mar 2000	limited series	
Gambit	vol. 1	#1–4	Dec 1993 – Mar 1994	limited series	
Gambit	vol. 2	#1–4	Sep 1997 – Dec 1997	limited series	
Gambit	vol. 3	#1–25	Feb 1999 – Feb 2001		
Gambit	vol. 3	1999, 2000	1999 – 2000	Annuals	
Gambit	vol. 3	Giant-Sized #1	Feb 1999	one-shot	
Gambit	vol. 4	#1–12	Nov 2004 – Aug 2005		
Gambit	vol. 5	#1–17	Oct 2012 – Nov 2013		
Gambit	vol. 6	#1–5	Sep 2022 – Jan 2023	limited series	
Gambit	Battlebook: Streets of Fire	#1	Dec 1998	one-shot	
Gambit	Gone	#1–5	Nov 2026 – present	limited series	
Gambit	Wanted	#1–5	Sep 2026 – present	limited series	
Gambit & Bishop		#1–6	Mar 2001 – May 2001	limited series; also known as Gambit & Bishop: Sons of the Atom	
Gambit & Bishop		Alpha	Feb 2001	one-shot	
Gambit & Bishop		Genesis	Mar 2001	one-shot	
Gambit & the X-Ternals		#1–4	Mar 1995 – Jun 1995	limited series; Age of Apocalypse (1995) tie-in	
Gamma Flight		#1–5	Aug 2021 – Dec 2021	limited series	
Gamora		#1–5	Feb 2017 – Jul 2017	limited series	
Gang War	Daredevil	#1–4	Feb 2024 – May 2024	limited series; also known as Daredevil: Gang War	
Gang War	Deadly Hands of Kung Fu	#1–3	Feb 2024 – Apr 2024	limited series; also known as Deadly Hands of Kung Fu: Gang War	
Gang War	Luke Cage	#1–4	Jan 2024 – Apr 2024	limited series; also known as Luke Cage: Gang War	
Gargoyle		#1–4	Jun 1985 – Sep 1985	limited series	
Gargoyles		#1–11	Feb 1995 – Dec 1995	based on the 1994 TV Series	
Gen13/Fantastic Four		#1	Mar 2001	one-shot; co-published with WildStorm/DC Comics	
Gen13/Generation X		#1	Jul 1997	one-shot; co-published with Image Comics	
Gene Dogs		#1–4	Oct 1993 – Jan 1994	limited series	
Generation Hope		#1–17	Jan 2011 – May 2012		
Generation M		#1–5	Jan 2006 – May 2006	limited series; Decimation tie-in	
Generation Next		#1–4	Mar 1995 – Jun 1995	limited series; Age of Apocalypse (1995) tie-in	
Generation X	vol. 1	#1–75 -1	Nov 1994 – Jun 2001		
Generation X	vol. 1	'95, '96, '97, '99	1995 – 1999	Annuals	
Generation X	vol. 1	Generation X/Dracula '98	1998	Annual	
Generation X	vol. 1	Holiday Special #1	Feb 1999		
Generation X	vol. 1	Underground Special #1	May 1998	one-shot	
Generation X	vol. 2	#1–9	Jul 2017 – Jan 2018		
Generation X	vol. 3	#85–87	Feb 2018 – Apr 2018	numbering continued from vol. 1	
Generation X/Gen13			Feb 1998	one-shot; co-published with Image Comics	
Generation X-23		#1–10	Apr 2026 – Jan 2027		
Generations	Banner Hulk & Totally Awesome Hulk	#1	Oct 2017	one-shot	
Generations	Captain Marvel & Captain Mar-Vell	#1	Nov 2017	one-shot	
Generations	Hawkeye & Hawkeye	#1	Oct 2017	one-shot	
Generations	Iron Man & Ironheart	#1	Nov 2017	one-shot	
Generations	Miles Morales Spider-Man & Peter Parker Spider-Man	#1	Nov 2017	one-shot	
Generations	Ms. Marvel & Ms. Marvel	#1	Nov 2017	one-shot	
Generations	Phoenix & Jean Grey	#1	Oct 2017	one-shot	
Generations	Sam Wilson Captain America & Steve Rogers Captain America	#1	Nov 2017	one-shot	
Generations	The Unworthy Thor & The Mighty Thor	#1	Oct 2017	one-shot	
Generations	Wolverine & All-New Wolverine	#1	Oct 2017	one-shot	
The Generic Comic		#1	Apr 1984	one-shot	
Genetix		#1–6	Oct 1993 – Mar 1994	limited series	
GeNeXt		#1–5	July 2008 – Nov 2008	limited series	
GeNeXt	United	#1–5	Jul 2009 – Nov 2009	limited series	
Genis-Vell: Captain Marvel		#1–5	Sep 2022 – Jan 2023	limited series	
George Romero's Empire of the Dead	Act One	#1–5	Mar 2014 – Aug 2014	limited series	
George Romero's Empire of the Dead	Act Two	#1–5	Nov 2014 – Mar 2015	limited series	
George Romero's Empire of the Dead	Act Three	#1–5	June 2015 – Nov 2015	limited series	
Get Fury		#1–6	Jul 2024 – Dec 2024	limited series	
Ghost Racers		#1–4	Aug 2015 – Nov 2015	limited series; Secret Wars (2015) tie-in	
Ghost Rider	vol. 1	#1–7	Feb 1967 – Nov 1967		
Ghost Rider	vol. 2	#1–81	Sep 1973 – Jun 1983		
Ghost Rider	vol. 3	#1–93 -1	May 1990 – Feb 1998		
Ghost Rider	vol. 3	Annual #1–2	1993 – 1994		
Ghost Rider	vol. 4	#1–6	Aug 2001 – Jan 2002	limited series	
Ghost Rider	vol. 5	#1–6	Nov 2005 – Apr 2006	limited series	
Ghost Rider	vol. 6	#1–35	Sep 2006 – Jul 2009		
Ghost Rider	vol. 6	Annual #1–2	Jan 2008 – Oct 2008		
Ghost Rider	vol. 7	#0.1; 1–9	Aug 2011 – May 2012		
Ghost Rider	vol. 8	#1–5	Jan 2017 – May 2017		
Ghost Rider	vol. 9	#1–7	Dec 2019 – Sep 2020		
Ghost Rider	vol. 10	#1–21	Apr 2022 – Feb 2024		
Ghost Rider	vol. 10	Annual #1	2023		
Ghost Rider	Crossroads	#1	Nov 1995	one-shot	
Ghost Rider	Danny Ketch	#1–5	Dec 2008 – Apr 2009	limited series	
Ghost Rider	Final Vengeance	#1–6	May 2024 – Oct 2024	limited series	
Ghost Rider	Finale	#94	Mar 2007	one-shot; numbering continued from vol. 3	
Ghost Rider	Kushala	#1	Jan 2027	one-shot	
Ghost Rider	Return of Vengeance	#1	Feb 2021	one-shot	
Ghost Rider	Robbie Reyes Special	#1	Dec 2024	one-shot	
Ghost Rider	Trail of Tears	#1–6	Apr 2007 – Sep 2007	limited series	
Ghost Rider	Vengeance Forever	#1	Oct 2022	one-shot	
Ghost Rider/	Ballistic	#1	Feb 1997	one-shot; co-published with Top Cow Productions and Image Comics	
Ghost Rider/	Blaze: Spirits of Vengeance	#1–23	Aug 1992 – Jun 1994		
Ghost Rider/	Captain America: Fear		Oct 1992	one-shot	
Ghost Rider/Wolverine: Weapons of Vengeance	Alpha	#1	Oct 2023	one-shot	
Ghost Rider/Wolverine: Weapons of Vengeance	Omega	#1	Nov 2023	one-shot	
Ghost Rider 2099	vol. 1	#1–25	May 1994 – May 1996		
Ghost Rider 2099	vol. 2	#1	Feb 2020	one-shot	
Ghost Rider and Cable: Servants of the Dead			Sep 1991	one-shot	
Ghost Rider and the Midnight Sons Magazine		#1	Dec 1993	one-shot	
Ghost Rider vs. Galactus		#1	Aug 2025	one-shot	
Ghost Rider, Wolverine, Punisher	Hearts of Darkness		Dec 1991	one-shot	
Ghost Rider, Wolverine, Punisher	The Dark Design		Dec 1994	one-shot	
Ghost Riders: Heaven's on Fire		#1–6	Sep 2009 – Feb 2010	limited series	
Ghost-Spider		#1–10	Oct 2019 – Oct 2020		
Ghost-Spider		Annual #1	Nov 2019		
Giant-Size (2024)	Daredevil	#1	Aug 2024	one-shot	
Giant-Size (2024)	Fantastic Four	#1	Apr 2024	one-shot	
Giant-Size (2024)	Hulk	#1	Jun 2024	one-shot	
Giant-Size (2024)	Silver Surfer	#1	Sep 2024	one-shot	
Giant-Size (2024)	Spider-Gwen	#1	May 2024	one-shot	
Giant-Size (2024)	Spider-Man	#1	Mar 2024	one-shot	
Giant-Size (2024)	Thor	#1	Oct 2024	one-shot	
Giant-Size (2024)	X-Men	#1	Jul 2024	one-shot	
Giant-Size Amazing Spider-Man		#1	Aug 2025	one-shot	
Giant-Size Amazing Spider-Man	Chameleon Conspiracy	#1	Aug 2021	one-shot; also known as Giant-Size Amazing Spider-Man: The Chameleon Conspiracy	
Giant-Size Amazing Spider-Man	King’s Ransom	#1	Jul 2021	one-shot	
Giant-Size Black Cat: Infinity Score		#1	Feb 2022	one-shot	
Giant-Size Chillers		#1–3	Feb 1975 – Aug 1975		
Giant-Size Creatures		#1	Jul 1974	continued as Giant-Size Werewolf	
Giant-Size Gwen Stacy		#1	Oct 2022	one-shot	
Giant-Size Little Marvel: AvX		#1–4	Aug 2015 – Nov 2015	limited series; Secret Wars (2015) tie-in	
Giant-Size Little Marvels		#1	Aug 2024	one-shot	
Giant Size Mini-Marvels: Starring Spidey		#1	Feb 2002	one-shot	
Giant-Size Super-Heroes		#1	Jun 1974	one-shot; subtitled Featuring Spider-Man	
Giant-Size X-Men (2020)	Fantomex	#1	Oct 2020	one-shot	
Giant-Size X-Men (2020)	Jean Grey and Emma Frost	#1	Apr 2020	one-shot	
Giant-Size X-Men (2020)	Magneto	#1	Sep 2020	one-shot	
Giant-Size X-Men (2020)	Nightcrawler	#1	May 2020	one-shot	
Giant-Size X-Men (2020)	Storm	#1	Nov 2020	one-shot	
Giant-Size X-Men (2020)	Thunderbird	#1	Jul 2022	one-shot	
Giant-Size X-Men (2020)	Tribute To Wein & Cockrum	#1	Nov 2020	one-shot	
Giant-Size X-Men (2025)		#1–2	Jul 2025 – Oct 2025	limited series; parts 1 & 5 of 5	
Giant-Size X-Men (2025)	Giant-Size Age of Apocalypse	#1	Aug 2025	one-shot; part 3 of 5	
Giant-Size X-Men (2025)	Giant-Size Dark Phoenix Saga	#1	Aug 2025	one-shot; part 2 of 5	
Giant-Size X-Men (2025)	Giant-Size House of M	#1	Sep 2025	one-shot; part 4 of 5	
Girl Comics	vol. 2	#1–3	May 2010 – Sep 2010	limited series vol. 1 published by Timely Comics and Atlas Comics	
Gladiator/Supreme		#1	Mar 1997	one-shot; co-published with Maximum Press	
GLX-Mas Special		#1	Feb 2006	one-shot	
Godzilla		#1–24	Aug 1977 – Jul 1979		
Godzilla Conquers the Multiverse		#1–5	Sep 2026 – Jan 2027	limited series	
Godzilla Destroys the Marvel Universe		#1–5	Sep 2025 – Jan 2026	limited series	
Godzilla: Infinity Roar		#1–5	Apr 2026 – Aug 2026	limited series	
Godzilla vs. the Marvel Universe	Godzilla vs. Avengers	#1	Aug 2025	one-shot; part 5 of 6	
Godzilla vs. the Marvel Universe	Godzilla vs. Fantastic Four	#1	May 2025	one-shot; part 1 of 6	
Godzilla vs. the Marvel Universe	Godzilla vs. Hulk	#1	Jun 2025	one-shot; part 2 of 6	
Godzilla vs. the Marvel Universe	Godzilla vs. Spider-Man	#1	Jun 2025	one-shot; part 3 of 6	
Godzilla vs. the Marvel Universe	Godzilla vs. Thor	#1	Sep 2025	one-shot; part 6 of 6	
Godzilla vs. the Marvel Universe	Godzilla vs. X-Men	#1	Jul 2025	one-shot; part 4 of 6	
Gold Goblin		#1–5	Jan 2023 – May 2023	limited series	
Gorilla Man		#1–3	Sep 2010 – Nov 2010	limited series	
Gravity		#1–5	Aug 2005 – Dec 2005	limited series	
Great Lakes Avengers		#1–7	Dec 2016 – Jun 2017		
Green Goblin		#1–13	Oct 1995 – Oct 1996		
Green Lantern/Silver Surfer: Unholy Alliances			1995	one-shot; co-published with DC	
Groot	vol. 1	#1–6	Aug 2015 – Jan 2016	limited series	
Groot	vol. 2	#1–4	Jul 2023 – Oct 2023	limited series	
Groovy		#1–3	Mar 1968 – Jul 1968		
Guardians		#1–5	Sep 2004 – Dec 2004	limited series	
Guardians 3000		#1–8	Dec 2014 – Jul 2015		
Guardians of Infinity		#1–8	Feb 2016 – Sep 2016		
Guardians of Knowhere		#1–4	Sep 2015 – Nov 2015	limited series; Secret Wars (2015) tie-in	
Guardians of the Galaxy	vol. 1	#1–62	Jun 1990 – Jul 1995		
Guardians of the Galaxy	vol. 1	Annual #1–4	1991 – 1994		
Guardians of the Galaxy	vol. 2	#1–25	Jul 2008 – Jun 2010		
Guardians of the Galaxy	vol. 3	#0.1; 1–27	Apr 2013 – Jul 2015		
Guardians of the Galaxy	vol. 3	Annual #1	2015		
Guardians of the Galaxy	vol. 4	#1–19 1.MU	Dec 2015 – Jun 2017		
Guardians of the Galaxy	vol. 5	#146–150	Dec 2017 – Mar 2018	continued from All-New Guardians of the Galaxy; numbering continued from vol. 1	
Guardians of the Galaxy	vol. 6	#1–12	Mar 2019 – Feb 2020		
Guardians of the Galaxy	vol. 6	Annual #1	2019		
Guardians of the Galaxy	vol. 7	#1–18	Mar 2020 – Nov 2021		
Guardians of the Galaxy	vol. 7	Annual #1	2021		
Guardians of the Galaxy	vol. 8	#1–10	Jun 2023 – Mar 2024		
Guardians of the Galaxy	vol. 8	Annual #1	2024		
Guardians of the Galaxy	Bane of Blastaar	#1	Jun 2023	one-shot	
Guardians of the Galaxy	Best Story Ever	#1	Jun 2015	one-shot	
Guardians of the Galaxy	Cosmic Rewind	#1	Jan 2023	one-shot	
Guardians of the Galaxy	Dream On	#1	Jun 2017	one-shot	
Guardians of the Galaxy	Galaxy's Most Wanted	#1	Sep 2014	one-shot	
Guardians of the Galaxy	Mission Breakout	#1	Jul 2017	one-shot	
Guardians of the Galaxy	Mother Entropy	#1–5	Jul 2017	limited series	
Guardians of the Galaxy	The Telltale Series	#1–5	Sep 2017 – Jan 2018	limited series; video game adaptation	
Guardians of the Galaxy	Tomorrow's Avengers	#1	Sep 2013	one-shot	
Guardians of the Galaxy & X-Men: The Black Vortex	Alpha	#1	Apr 2015	one-shot	
Guardians of the Galaxy & X-Men: The Black Vortex	Omega	#1	Jun 2015	one-shot	
Guardians Team-Up		#1–10	May 2015 – Oct 2015		
Guidebook to the Marvel Cinematic Universe	Marvel's Agents of S.H.I.E.L.D. Season One	#1	Aug 2016	one-shot; TV tie-in	
Guidebook to the Marvel Cinematic Universe	Marvel's Agents of S.H.I.E.L.D. Season Three/Marvel's Agent Carter Season Two	#1	Feb 2017	one-shot; TV tie-in	
Guidebook to the Marvel Cinematic Universe	Marvel's Agents of S.H.I.E.L.D. Season Two/Marvel's Agent Carter Season One	#1	Dec 2016	one-shot; TV tie-in	
Guidebook to the Marvel Cinematic Universe	Marvel's Avengers: Age of Ultron	#1	Nov 2016	one-shot; film tie-in	
Guidebook to the Marvel Cinematic Universe	Marvel's Captain America: Civil War	#1	Mar 2017	one-shot; film tie-in	
Guidebook to the Marvel Cinematic Universe	Marvel's Captain America: The First Avenger	#1	Mar 2016	one-shot; film tie-in	
Guidebook to the Marvel Cinematic Universe	Marvel's Captain America: The Winter Soldier/Marvel's Ant-Man	#1	Jul 2016	one-shot; film tie-in	
Guidebook to the Marvel Cinematic Universe	Marvel's Doctor Strange	#1	May 2017	one-shot; film tie-in	
Guidebook to the Marvel Cinematic Universe	Marvel's Guardians of the Galaxy	#1	Sep 2016	one-shot; film tie-in	
Guidebook to the Marvel Cinematic Universe	Marvel's Incredible Hulk/Marvel's Iron Man 2	#1	Jan 2016	one-shot; film tie-in	
Guidebook to the Marvel Cinematic Universe	Marvel's Iron Man	#1	Dec 2015	one-shot; film tie-in	
Guidebook to the Marvel Cinematic Universe	Marvel's Iron Man 3/Marvel's Thor: The Dark World	#1	Jun 2016	one-shot; film tie-in	
Guidebook to the Marvel Cinematic Universe	Marvel's The Avengers	#1	Apr 2016	one-shot; film tie-in	
Guidebook to the Marvel Cinematic Universe	Marvel's Thor	#1	Feb 2016	one-shot; film tie-in	
Gun Runner		#1–6	Oct 1993 – Mar 1994	limited series	
The Gunhawks	vol. 1	#1–7	Oct 1972 – Oct 1973		
The Gunhawks	vol. 2	#1	Apr 2019	one-shot	
Gun-slinger		#2–3	Apr 1973 – Jun 1973	continued from Tex Dawson, Gun-slinger	
Gunslingers		#1	Feb 2000	one-shot	
Gunsmoke Western		#65–77	Jul 1961 – Jul 1963	previous issues published by Atlas Comics	
Gwen Stacy		#1–2	Apr 2020 – May 2020	limited series; originally solicited as 5-issue series; reprinted and completed as Giant-Size Gwen Stacy	
Gwenpool		#1–5	Jul 2025 – Nov 2025	limited series	
Gwenpool Holiday Special: Merry Mix Up		#1	Feb 2017	one-shot	
Gwenpool Special		#1	Feb 2016	one-shot	
Gwenpool Strikes Back		#1–5	Oct 2019 – Feb 2020	limited series	
