= List of Marvel Comics publications (B–C) =

Marvel Comics is an American comic book company dating to 1961. This is a list of the publications it has released in its history under the "Marvel Comics" imprint. The list does not include collected editions; trade paperbacks; digital comics; free, promotional giveaways; sketchbooks; poster books or magazines, nor does it include series published by other Marvel imprints such as Epic, Icon or Star. It also does not include titles published by Marvel's pre-1961 predecessors Timely Comics and Atlas Comics.

- List of Marvel Comics publications (A)
- List of Marvel Comics publications (D–E)
- List of Marvel Comics publications (F–G)
- List of Marvel Comics publications (H–L)
- List of Marvel Comics publications (M)
- List of Marvel Comics publications (N–R)
- List of Marvel Comics publications (S)
- List of Marvel Comics publications (T–V)
- List of Marvel Comics publications (W–Z)

== B ==
Title	Series	Issues	Dates	Notes	Reference
B-Sides		#1–3	Nov 2002 – Jan 2003	limited series	
Baby's First Deadpool Book		#1	Dec 1998	one-shot	
Backlash/Spider-Man		#1–2	Aug 1996 – Oct 1996	limited series; co-published with Image Comics	
Badrock/Wolverine		#1	Jun 1996	one-shot; co-published with Image Comics	
Balder the Brave		#1–4	Nov 1985 – May 1986	limited series	
Ballistic/Wolverine		#1	Feb 1997	one-shot; co-published with Top Cow Productions and Image Comics	
Barbie		#1–63	Jan 1991 – Mar 1996		
Barbie & Baby Sister Kelly			1995	one-shot	
Barbie Fashion		#1–53	Jan 1991 – May 1995		
Batman/	Captain America		Oct 1996	one-shot; co-published with DC	
Batman/	Daredevil		2000	one-shot; co-published with DC	
Batman/	Punisher: Lake of Fire		Jun 1994	one-shot; co-published with DC	
Batman/	Spider-Man		Oct 1997	one-shot; co-published with DC	
Batman vs. The Incredible Hulk			1981; 1995 (reprint)	one-shot; co-published with DC; issue #27 of DC Special Series	
Battle Scars		#1–6	Jan 2012 – Jun 2012	limited series	
Battlestar Galactica		#1–23	Mar 1979 – Jan 1981	based on the 1978 TV Series	
Battletide	vol. 1	#1–4	Dec 1992 – Mar 1993	limited series	
Battletide	vol. 2	#1–4	Aug 1993 – Nov 1993	limited series	
Battleworld		#1–5	Nov 2025 – Mar 2026	limited series	
Beast		#1–3	May 1997 – Jul 1997	limited series	
Beauty and the Beast		#1–4	Dec 1984 – Jun 1985	limited series	
Beavis and Butt-Head		#1–28	Mar 1994 – Jun 1996		
Before the Fantastic Four	Ben Grimm and Logan	#1–3	Jul 2000 – Sep 2000	limited series	
Before the Fantastic Four	Reed Richards	#1–3	Sep 2000 – Dec 2000	limited series	
Before the Fantastic Four	The Storms	#1–3	Dec 2000 – Feb 2001	limited series	
Ben Reilly	Scarlet Spider	#1–25	Jun 2017 – Dec 2018		
Ben Reilly	Spider-Man	#1–5	Mar 2022 – Aug 2022	limited series	
The Best Defense	Defenders	#1	Feb 2019	one-shot; also known as Defenders: The Best Defense; part 5 of 5	
The Best Defense	Doctor Strange	#1	Feb 2019	one-shot; also known as Doctor Strange: The Best Defense; part 3 of 5	
The Best Defense	Immortal Hulk	#1	Feb 2019	one-shot; also known as Immortal Hulk: The Best Defense; part 1 of 5	
The Best Defense	Namor	#1	Feb 2019	one-shot; also known as Namor: The Best Defense; part 2 of 5	
The Best Defense	Silver Surfer	#1	Feb 2019	one-shot; also known as Silver Surfer: The Best Defense; part 4 of 5	
Beta Ray Bill		#1–5	May 2021 – Sep 2021	limited series	
Beta Ray Bill	Godhunter	#1–3	Aug 2009 – Oct 2009	limited series	
Betsy Braddock: Captain Britain		#1–5	Apr 2023 – Aug 2023	limited series	
Beware!		#1–8	Mar 1973 – May 1974	continued as Tomb of Darkness	
Beware the Planet of the Apes		#1–4	Mar 2024 – Jun 2024	limited series; published under the 20th Century Studios imprint	
Beyond!		#1–6	Sep 2006 – Feb 2007	limited series	
Big Hero 6		#1–5	Nov 2008 – Mar 2009	limited series	
Big Thunder Mountain Railroad		#1–5	May 2015 – Oct 2015	limited series	
Big Town		#1–4	Dec 2000 – Mar 2001	limited series; also known as Fantastic Four: Big Town	
Biker Mice from Mars		#1–3	Nov 1993 – Jan 1994	limited series	
Bill & Ted's Bogus Journey		#1	Sep 1991	one-shot movie adaptation	
Bill & Ted's Excellent Comic Book		#1–12	Dec 1991 – Nov 1992		
Binary		#1–3	Dec 2025 – Feb 2026	limited series; Age of Revelation tie-in	
Bishop	vol. 1	#1–4	Dec 1994 – Mar 1995	limited series	
Bishop	vol. 2	#1–5	Aug 2026 – Dec 2026	limited series	
Bishop	The Last X-Man	#1–16	Oct 1999 – Jan 2001		
Bishop	War College	#1–5	Apr 2023 – Aug 2023	limited series	
Bishop	XSE	#1–3	Jan 1998 – Mar 1998	limited series; also known as Bishop: Xavier Security Enforcer	
Bizarre Adventures	vol. 1	#25–34	Mar 1981 – Feb 1983	continued from Marvel Preview	
Bizarre Adventures	vol. 2	#1	Dec 2019	one-shot	
Black Axe		#1–7	Apr 1993 – Oct 1993		
Black Bolt		#1–12	Jul 2017 – Jun 2018	limited series	
Black Cat	vol. 1	#1–12	Aug 2019 – Oct 2020		
Black Cat	vol. 1	Annual #1	2019		
Black Cat	vol. 2	#1–10	Feb 2021 – Nov 2021		
Black Cat	vol. 2	Annual #1	2021		
Black Cat	vol. 3	#1–	Oct 2025 – present		
Black Eyed Peas Presents: Masters of the Sun - The Zombie Chronicles			Aug 2017	one-shot	
Black Goliath		#1–5	Feb 1976 – Nov 1976		
Black Knight	vol. 2	#1–4	Jun 1990 – Sep 1990	limited series; vol. 1 was published by Atlas Comics	
Black Knight	vol. 3	#1	Jan 2010	one-shot	
Black Knight	vol. 4	#1–5	Jan 2016 – May 2016		
Black Knight	Curse of the Ebony Blade	#1–5	May 2021 – Sep 2021	limited series	
Black Knight	Exodus	#1	Dec 1996	one-shot	
Black Order		#1–5	Jan 2019 – May 2019	limited series	
Black Panther	vol. 1	#1–15	Jan 1977 – May 1979		
Black Panther	vol. 2	#1–4	Jul 1988 – Oct 1988	limited series	
Black Panther	vol. 3	#1–62	Nov 1998 – Sep 2003		
Black Panther	vol. 4	#1–41	Apr 2005 – Nov 2008		
Black Panther	vol. 4	Annual #1	Apr 2008		
Black Panther	vol. 5	#1–12	Apr 2009 – Mar 2010	Dark Reign tie-in initially; continued as on-going series	
Black Panther	vol. 6	#1–18	Jun 2016 – Nov 2017		
Black Panther	vol. 7	#166–172	Dec 2017 – Jun 2018	numbering continued from vol. 1	
Black Panther	vol. 7	Annual #1	Apr 2018		
Black Panther	vol. 8	#1–25	Jul 2018 – Jul 2021		
Black Panther	vol. 9	#1–15	Jan 2022 – May 2023		
Black Panther	vol. 10	#1–10	Aug 2023 – May 2024		
Black Panther	60th Anniversary Special	#1	Apr 2026	one-shot	
Black Panther	Blood Hunt	#1–3	Jul 2024 – Sep 2024	limited series	
Black Panther	Intergalactic	#1–4	Feb 2026 – May 2026		
Black Panther	Legends	#1–4	Dec 2021 – Jul 2022	limited series	
Black Panther	Panther's Prey	#1–4	May 1991 – Oct 1991	limited series	
Black Panther	The Man Without Fear	#513–523	Feb 2011 – Nov 2011	continued from Daredevil vol. 2; continued as Black Panther: The Most Dangerous Man Alive	
Black Panther	The Most Dangerous Man Alive	#523.1 – 529	Nov 2011 – Apr 2012	continued from Black Panther: The Man Without Fear	
Black Panther	The Sound and the Fury	#1	Apr 2018	one-shot	
Black Panther	Unconquered	#1	Jan 2023	one-shot	
Black Panther	World of Wakanda	#1–6	Jan 2017 – Jun 2017		
Black Panther 2099		#1	Nov 2004	one-shot	
Black Panther and the Agents of Wakanda		#1–8	Nov 2019 – Sep 2020		
Black Panther and the Crew		#1–6	Jun 2017 – Aug 2017		
Black Panther/Namor: Doomed		#1–5	Nov 2026 – present	limited series	
Black Panther vs. Deadpool		#1–5	Dec 2018 – Apr 2019	limited series	
Black Widow	vol. 1	#1–3	Jun 1999 – Aug 1999	limited series	
Black Widow	vol. 2	#1–3	Jan 2001 – Mar 2001	limited series	
Black Widow	vol. 3	#1–6	Nov 2004 – Apr 2005	limited series	
Black Widow	vol. 4	#1–8	Jun 2010 – Jan 2011		
Black Widow	vol. 5	#1–20	Mar 2014 – Sep 2015		
Black Widow	vol. 6	#1–12	May 2016 – May 2017		
Black Widow	vol. 7	#1–5	Mar 2019 – Jul 2019	limited series	
Black Widow	vol. 8	#1–15	Nov 2020 – Jun 2022		
Black Widow	2	#1–6	Nov 2005 – Apr 2006	limited series	
Black Widow	Deadly Origin	#1–4	Jan 2010 – Apr 2010	limited series	
Black Widow	Pale Little Spider	#1–3	Jun 2002 – Aug 2002	limited series	
Black Widow	Venomous	#1	Sep 2024	one-shot	
Black Widow	Widow's Sting	#1	Dec 2020	one-shot	
Black Widow &	Hawkeye	#1–4	May 2024 – Aug 2024	limited series	
Black Widow &	The Marvel Girls	#1–4	Feb 2010 – Apr 2010	limited series	
Blackwulf		#1–10	Jun 1994 – Mar 1995		
Blade	vol. 1	#1–3	Nov 1998 – Jan 1999	limited series; announced as 6 issue series but only 3 were published	
Blade	vol. 2	#1–6	May 2002 – Oct 2002	limited series	
Blade	vol. 3	#1–12	Nov 2006 – Oct 2007		
Blade	vol. 4	#1–10	Sep 2023 – Jun 2024		
Blade	vol. 5	#1–5	Dec 2024 – Apr 2025	limited series; also known as Blade: Red Band	
Blade	Crescent City Blues	#1	Mar 1998	one-shot	
Blade	Sins of the Father	#1	Oct 1998	one-shot	
Blade	Vampire Nation	#1	Jan 2023	one-shot	
Blade 2: Movie Adaptation		#1	May 2002	one-shot; movie adaptation	
Blade Runner		#1–2	Oct 1982 – Nov 1982	limited series; movie adaptation	
Blade: Vampire Hunter	vol. 1	#1–10	Jul 1994 – Apr 1995	titled Blade: The Vampire-Hunter	
Blade: Vampire Hunter	vol. 2	#1–6	Dec 1999 – May 2000	limited series	
Blaze		#1–12	Aug 1994 – Jul 1995		
Blaze	Legacy of Blood	#1–4	Dec 1993 – Mar 1994	limited series	
Blaze of Glory		#1–4	Feb 2000 – Mar 2000	limited series	
Blink		#1–4	Mar 2001 – Jun 2001	limited series	
Blockbusters of the Marvel Universe		#1	Mar 2011	one-shot	
Blood and Glory		#1–3	Oct 1992 – Dec 1992	limited series	
Blood Hunt		#1–5	Jul 2024 – Sep 2024	limited series	
Blood Hunters	vol. 1	#1–4	Jul 2024 – Sep 2024	limited series	
Blood Hunters	vol. 2	#1–5	Oct 2024 – Feb 2025	limited series	
Bloodline: Daughter of Blade		#1–5	Apr 2023 – Aug 2023	limited series	
Bloodseed		#1–2	Oct 1993 – Nov 1993	limited series	
Bloodstone		#1–4	Dec 2001 – Mar 2002	limited series	
Book of the Dead		#1–4	Dec 1993 – Mar 1994	limited series	
Books of Doom		#1–6	Jan 2006 – Jun 2006	limited series	
Born		#1–4	Aug 2003 – Nov 2003	limited series	
Breaking Into Comics the Marvel Way		#1–2	May 2010	limited series	
Bring on the Bad Guys	Abomination	#1	Sep 2025	one-shot; part 3 of 7	
Bring on the Bad Guys	Doom	#1	Aug 2025	one-shot; part 1 of 7	
Bring on the Bad Guys	Dormammu	#1	Oct 2025	one-shot; part 6 of 7	
Bring on the Bad Guys	Green Goblin	#1	Sep 2025	one-shot; part 2 of 7	
Bring on the Bad Guys	Loki	#1	Sep 2025	one-shot; part 4 of 7	
Bring on the Bad Guys	Mephisto	#1	Oct 2025	one-shot; part 7 of 7	
Bring on the Bad Guys	Red Skull	#1	Oct 2025	one-shot; part 5 of 7	
The Brotherhood		#1–9	Jul 2001 – Mar 2002		
Bruce Wayne: Agent of S.H.I.E.L.D.		#1	Apr 1996	One-shot; published under the Amalgam Comics imprint in association with DC	
Brute Force		#1–4	Aug 1990 – Nov 1990	limited series	
Buckaroo Banzai		#1–2	Dec 1984 – Feb 1985	limited series; movie adaptation	
Bucky Barnes: The Winter Soldier		#1–11	Dec 2014 – Nov 2015		
Bug		#1	Mar 1997	one-shot	
Bullet Points		#1–5	Jan 2007 – May 2007	limited series	
Bullets and Bracelets		#1	Apr 1996	One-shot; published under the Amalgam Comics imprint in association with DC	
Bullseye		#1–5	Apr 2017 – Aug 2017	limited series	
Bullseye	Greatest Hits	#1–5	Nov 2004 – Mar 2005	limited series	
Bullseye	Perfect Game	#1–2	Jan 2011 – Feb 2011	limited series	
The Buzz		#1–3	Jul 2000 – Sep 2000	limited series	

== C ==
Title	Series	Issues	Dates	Notes	Reference
Cable	vol. 1	#1–107	May 1993 – Sep 2002		
Cable	vol. 1	Cable/X-Force '96	1996	Annual; also known as X-Force and Cable '96	
Cable	vol. 1	Cable/Machine Man '98	1998	Annual	
Cable	vol. 1	1999	1999	Annual	
Cable	vol. 2	#1–25	May 2008 – Jun 2010	continued as Deadpool & Cable	
Cable	vol. 2	King-Size Spectacular #1	Nov 2008		
Cable	vol. 3	#1–5	Jul 2017 – Nov 2017		
Cable	vol. 4	#150–159	Dec 2017 – Sep 2018	numbering continued from vol. 1	
Cable	vol. 5	#1–12	May 2020 – Sep 2021		
Cable	vol. 6	#1–4	Mar 2024 – Jul 2024	limited series; Fall of the House of X tie-in	
Cable	Blood and Metal	#1–2	Oct 1992 – Nov 1992	limited series	
Cable	Love and Chrome	#1–5	Mar 2025 – Jul 2025	limited series	
Cable	Reloaded	#1	Oct 2021	one-shot	
Cable	Second Genesis	#1	Aug 1999	one-shot	
Cable & Deadpool	vol. 1	#1–50	May 2004 – Apr 2008	also known as Cable/Deadpool	
Cable & Deadpool	vol. 2	Annual #1	Oct 2018	one-shot	
Cable and X-Force		#1–19	Feb 2013 – Mar 2014		
Cage	vol. 1	#1–20	Apr 1992 – Nov 1993		
Cage	vol. 2	#1–5	Mar 2002 – Sep 2002	limited series	
Cage	vol. 3	#1–4	Dec 2016 – Mar 2017	limited series; titled Cage!	
The Call		#1–4	Jun 2003 – Sep 2003	limited series	
The Call of Duty	The Brotherhood	#1–6	Aug 2002 – Jan 2003	limited series	
The Call of Duty	The Precinct	#1–5	Sep 2002 – Jan 2003	limited series	
The Call of Duty	The Wagon	#1–4	Oct 2002 – Jan 2003	limited series	
Camp Candy		#1–6	May 1990 – Oct 1990	based on the TV show	
Captain America	vol. 2	#100–454	Apr 1968 – Aug 1996	vol. 1 published as Captain America Comics by Timely/Atlas Comics continued from Tales of Suspense #134–222 titled Captain America and the Falcon #444–446 titled Steve Rogers Captain America	
Captain America	vol. 2	Annual #1–13	1971 – 1994		
Captain America	vol. 2	Giant-Size #1	1975		
Captain America	vol. 3	#1–13	Nov 1996 – Nov 1997		
Captain America	vol. 4	#1–50	Jan 1998 – Feb 2002	issues #41–50 are dual numbered as #509–518	
Captain America	vol. 4	Captain America/Citizen V '98	1998	Annual	
Captain America	vol. 4	1999, 2000, 2001	1999 – 2001	Annuals	
Captain America	vol. 5	#1–32	Jun 2002 – Dec 2004		
Captain America	vol. 6	#1–50; 600–619 615.1	Jan 2005 – Aug 2011	renumbered after #50 to #600 continued as Captain America and Bucky	
Captain America	vol. 7	#1–19	Sep 2011 – Dec 2012		
Captain America	vol. 8	#1–25	Jan 2013 – Dec 2014		
Captain America	vol. 9	#25	Oct 2017	continued from Captain America: Sam Wilson	
Captain America	vol. 10	#695–704	Jan 2018 – Aug 2018	numbering continued from vol. 1	
Captain America	vol. 11	#1–30	Sep 2018 – Sep 2021		
Captain America	vol. 11	Annual #1	2018		
Captain America	vol. 11	Annual #1	2021	2nd Annual #1 published in this volume	
Captain America	vol. 12	#0	Jun 2022	one-shot	
Captain America	vol. 13	#750	Sep 2023	one-shot	
Captain America	vol. 14	#1–16	Nov 2023 – Feb 2025		
Captain America	vol. 15	#1–	Sep 2025 – present		
Captain America	65th Anniversary Special	#1	May 2006	one-shot	
Captain America	75th Anniversary Magazine	#1	Jun 2016	one-shot	
Captain America	America's Avenger	#1	Aug 2011	one-shot	
Captain America	Anniversary Tribute	#1	May 2021	one-shot	
Captain America	Battlebook: Streets of Fire	#1	Nov 1998	one-shot	
Captain America	Collectors' Preview	#1	Mar 1995	one-shot	
Captain America	Dead Men Running	#1–3	Mar 2002 – May 2002	limited series	
Captain America	Drug War	#1	Apr 1994	one-shot	
Captain America	Fighting Avenger	#1	Jun 2011	one-shot; also known as Captain America: The Fighting Avenger	
Captain America	Finale	#1	Oct 2023	one-shot	
Captain America	First Vengeance	#1–4	Jul 2011 – Aug 2011	limited series	
Captain America	Forever Allies	#1–4	Oct 2010 – Jan 2011	limited series	
Captain America	Hail Hydra	#1–5	Mar 2011 – Jul 2011	limited series	
Captain America	Homecoming	#1	May 2014	one-shot	
Captain America	Living Legend	#1–4	Dec 2013 – Jan 2014	limited series	
Captain America	Man Out of Time	#1–5	Jan 2011 – May 2011	limited series	
Captain America	Medusa Effect	#1	Mar 1994	one-shot	
Captain America	Patriot	#1–4	Nov 2010 – Feb 2011	limited series	
Captain America	Rebirth	#1	Jun 2011	one-shot	
Captain America	Reborn	#1–6	Sep 2009 – Mar 2010	limited series	
Captain America	Reborn	Who Will Wield the Shield? #1	Feb 2010	one-shot	
Captain America	Red, White & Blue		2002	graphic novel	
Captain America	Road to War	#1	Jun 2016	one-shot	
Captain America	Sam Wilson	#1–24	Dec 2015 – Sep 2017	continued as Captain America vol. 9	
Captain America	Special Edition	#1–2	Feb 1984 – Mar 1984	limited series	
Captain America	Spotlight		Jul 2011	one-shot; film tie-in	
Captain America	Steve Rogers	#1–19	Jul 2016 – Sep 2017		
Captain America	Symbol of Truth	#1–14	Jul 2022 – Aug 2023		
Captain America	The 1940s Newspaper Strip	#1–3	Aug 2010 – Oct 2010	limited series	
Captain America	The Chosen	#1–6	Nov 2007 – Mar 2008	limited series	
Captain America	The End	#1	Apr 2020	one-shot	
Captain America	The Legend	#1	Sep 1996	one-shot	
Captain America	The Movie Special		May 1992	one-shot; film tie-in	
Captain America	What Price Glory	#1–4	May 2003	limited series	
Captain America	White	#0–5	Sep 2008; Nov 2015 – Feb 2016	limited series	
Captain America	Who Won't Wield the Shield?	#1	Jun 2010	one-shot	
Captain America and	Batroc	#1	May 2011	one-shot	
Captain America and	Black Widow	#636–640	Nov 2012 – Feb 2013	continued from Captain America and Namor	
Captain America and	Bucky	#620–628	Sep 2011 – May 2012	continued from Captain America vol. 6; continued as Captain America and Hawkeye	
Captain America and	Crossbones	#1	May 2011	one-shot	
Captain America and	Falcon	#1	May 2011	one-shot	
Captain America and	Hawkeye	#629–632	Jun 2012 – Aug 2012	continued from Captain America and Bucky; continued as Captain America and Iron Man	
Captain America and	Iron Man	#633–635	Aug 2012 – Oct 2012	continued from Captain America and Hawkeye; continued as Captain America and Namor	
Captain America and	Namor	#635.1	Oct 2012	continued from Captain America and Iron Man; continued as Captain America and Black Widow	
Captain America and	The Falcon	#1–14	May 2004 – Jun 2005		
Captain America and	The First Thirteen	#1	May 2011	one-shot	
Captain America and	The Invaders: Bahamas Triangle	#1	Sep 2019	one-shot	
Captain America and	The Korvac Saga	#1–4	Feb 2011 – May 2011	limited series	
Captain America and	The Mighty Avengers	#1–9	Jan 2015 – Aug 2015		
Captain America and	The Secret Avengers	#1	May 2011	one-shot	
Captain America and	The Winter Soldier Special	#1	Jan 2023	one-shot	
Captain America and	Thor!: Avengers	#1	Sep 2011	one-shot	
Captain America and	Volstagg	#1	Apr 2025	one-shot	
Captain America/Black Panther: Flags of Our Fathers		#1–4	Jun 2010 – Sep 2010	limited series	
Captain America: Cold War	Alpha	#1	Jun 2023	one-shot	
Captain America: Cold War	Omega	#1	Aug 2023	one-shot	
Captain America Comics: 70th Anniversary Special		#1	Jun 2009	one-shot	
Captain America Corps		#1–5	Aug 2011 – Dec 2011	limited series	
Captain America/Iron Man		#1–5	Feb 2022 – May 2022	limited series	
Captain America/Nick Fury	Blood Truce		Feb 1995	one-shot	
Captain America/Nick Fury	The Otherworld War	#1	Oct 2001	one-shot	
Captain America: Sentinel of Liberty	vol. 1	#1–12	Sep 1998 – Aug 1999		
Captain America: Sentinel of Liberty	vol. 2	#1–13	Aug 2022 – Aug 2023		
Captain America Theater of War		A Brother in Arms	Jun 2009	one-shot	
Captain America Theater of War		America First	Feb 2009	one-shot	
Captain America Theater of War		America the Beautiful	Mar 2009	one-shot	
Captain America Theater of War		Ghosts of My Country	Dec 2009	one-shot	
Captain America Theater of War		Operation Zero-Point	Dec 2008	one-shot	
Captain America Theater of War		Prisoners of Duty	Feb 2010	one-shot	
Captain America Theater of War		To Soldier On	Oct 2009	one-shot	
Captain Britain 50th Anniversary Special		#1	Dec 2026	one-shot	
Captain Britain and MI13		#1–15	Jul 2008 – Sep 2009		
Captain Britain and MI13		Annual #1	Aug 2009		
Captain Britain and the Mighty Defenders		#1–2	Sep 2015 – Oct 2015	limited series; Secret Wars (2015) tie-in	
Captain Carter		#1–5	May 2022 – Oct 2022	limited series	
Captain Justice		#1–2	Mar 1988 – Apr 1988	limited series; based on the 1987 TV series	
Captain Marvel	vol. 1	#1–62	May 1968 – May 1979		
Captain Marvel	vol. 1	Giant-Size #1	Dec 1975		
Captain Marvel	vol. 2	#1	Nov 1989	one-shot	
Captain Marvel	vol. 3	#1	Feb 1994	one-shot	
Captain Marvel	vol. 4	#1–6	Dec 1995 – May 1996	limited series	
Captain Marvel	vol. 5	#1–35	Jan 2000 – Oct 2002		
Captain Marvel	vol. 6	#1–25	Nov 2002 – Sep 2004	dual numbered #36–60	
Captain Marvel	vol. 7	#1–5	Jan 2008 – Jun 2008	limited series	
Captain Marvel	vol. 8	#1–17	Sep 2012 – Feb 2014		
Captain Marvel	vol. 9	#1–15	May 2014 – May 2015		
Captain Marvel	vol. 10	#1–10	Mar 2016 – Jan 2017		
Captain Marvel	vol. 11	#125–129	Dec 2017 – Apr 2018	continued from The Mighty Captain Marvel; numbering continued from Ms. Marvel vol. 1	
Captain Marvel	vol. 12	#1–50	Mar 2019 – Aug 2023		
Captain Marvel	vol. 12	Annual #1	2022		
Captain Marvel	vol. 13	#1–10	Dec 2023 – Sep 2024		
Captain Marvel	Assault on Eden	#1	Dec 2023	one-shot	
Captain Marvel	Braver & Mightier	#1	Apr 2019	one-shot	
Captain Marvel	Dark Past	#1–5	Jun 2026 – Oct 2026	limited series	
Captain Marvel	Dark Tempest	#1–5	Sep 2023 – Jan 2024	limited series	
Captain Marvel	The End	#1	Mar 2020	one-shot	
Captain Marvel and the Carol Corps		#1–4	Aug 2015 – Sep 2015	limited series; Secret Wars (2015) tie-in	
Captain Marvel/Ms. Marvel: Secret Invasion Infiltration			May 2008	one-shot	
Captain Planet and the Planeteers		#1–12	Oct 1991 – Oct 1992	based on the 1990s TV series	
Captain Savage and his Leatherneck Raiders		#1–19	Jan 1968 – Mar 1970		
Captain Universe/	Daredevil	#1	Jan 2006	one-shot	
Captain Universe/	Hulk	#1	Jan 2006	one-shot	
Captain Universe/	Invisible Woman	#1	Jan 2006	one-shot	
Captain Universe/	Silver Surfer	#1	Jan 2006	one-shot	
Captain Universe/	X-23	#1	Jan 2006	one-shot	
Captain Universe: The Hero Who Could Be You		#1	Jul 2013	one-shot	
Capwolf & the Howling Commandos		#1–4	Dec 2023 – Mar 2024	limited series	
Carnage	vol. 1	#1–5	Dec 2010 – Aug 2011	limited series	
Carnage	vol. 2	#1–16	Jan 2016 – Mar 2017		
Carnage	vol. 3	#1–14	May 2022 – Aug 2023		
Carnage	vol. 4	#1–8	Jan 2024 – Aug 2024		
Carnage	Black, White & Blood	#1–4	May 2021 – Sep 2021	limited series	
Carnage	Forever	#1	Apr 2022	one-shot	
Carnage	It's a Wonderful Life	#1	Oct 1996	one-shot	
Carnage	Mind Bomb	#1	Feb 1996	one-shot	
Carnage	U.S.A.	#1–5	Feb 2012 – June 2012	limited series	
Carnage Reigns	Alpha	#1	Jul 2023	one-shot	
Carnage Reigns	Omega	#1	Aug 2023	one-shot	
Casper	vol. 1	#1	Jul 1995	one-shot; adaptation of 1995 film	
Casper	vol. 2	#1–2	May 1997		
Castle	A Calm Before Storm	#1–5	Feb 2013 – May 2013	limited series; TV tie-in	
Castle	Richard Castle's Deadly Storm		2011	graphic novel; TV tie-in	
Castle	Richard Castle’s Storm Season		2012	graphic novel; TV tie-in	
Castle	Unholy Storm		2014	graphic novel; TV tie-in	
The Cat		#1–4	Nov 1972 – Jun 1973		
Cataclysm		#0.1	Dec 2013	one-shot	
Cataclysm	The Ultimates' Last Stand	#1–5	Jan 2014 – Apr 2014	limited series	
Cataclysm	Ultimates	#1–3	Jan 2014 – Mar 2014	limited series	
Cataclysm	Ultimate Spider-Man	#1–3	Jan 2014 – Mar 2014	limited series	
Cataclysm	Ultimate X-Men	#1–3	Jan 2014 – Mar 2014	limited series	
The Cavalry: S.H.I.E.L.D. 50th Anniversary		#1	Nov 2015	one-shot	
Century: Distant Sons		#1	Feb 1996	one-shot	
Challengers of the Fantastic		#1	Jun 1997	One-shot; published under the Amalgam Comics imprint in association with DC	
Challenges of Doom	Doctor Strange	#1	Jan 2027	one-shot	
Challenges of Doom	Mr. Fantastic	#1	Sep 2026	one-shot	
Challenges of Doom	Spider-Man	#1	Nov 2026	one-shot	
Chamber		#1–4	Oct 2002 – Jan 2003	limited series	
Chamber of Chills		#1–25	Nov 1972 – Nov 1976		
Chamber of Darkness		#1–8	Oct 1969 – Dec 1970	continued as Monsters on the Prowl	
Chamber of Darkness		Special #1	Jan 1972		
Champions	vol. 1	#1–17	Oct 1975 – Jan 1978		
Champions	vol. 2	#1–27 1.MU	Dec 2016 – Feb 2019		
Champions	vol. 2	Annual #1	2019		
Champions	vol. 3	#1–10	Mar 2019 – Dec 2019		
Champions	vol. 4	#1–10	Dec 2020 – Dec 2021		
Chaos War		#1–5	Dec 2010 – Mar 2011	limited series	
Chaos War	Alpha Flight	#1	Jan 2011	one-shot	
Chaos War	Ares	#1	Feb 2011	one-shot	
Chaos War	Chaos King	#1	Jan 2011	one-shot	
Chaos War	Dead Avengers	#1–3	Jan 2011 – Mar 2011	limited series	
Chaos War	God Squad	#1	Feb 2011	one-shot	
Chaos War	Thor	#1–2	Jan 2011 – Feb 2011	limited series	
Chaos War	X-Men	#1–2	Feb 2011 – Mar 2011	limited series	
Chasm: Curse of Kaine		#1–4	Oct 2024 – Jan 2025	limited series	
Chewbacca		#1–5	Dec 2015 – Feb 2016	limited series	
Children of the Atom		#1–6	May 2021 – Oct 2021		
Children of the Vault		#1–4	Oct 2023 – Jan 2024	limited series; Fall of X tie-in	
Children of the Voyager		#1–4	Sep 1993 – Dec 1993	limited series	
Chili		#1–26	May 1969 – Dec 1973		
Chili		Annual #1	Dec 1971	also known as Queen-Size Special	
Chris Claremont Anniversary Special		#1	Mar 2021	one-shot	
Citizen V and the V-Battalion		#1–3	Jun 2001 – Aug 2001	limited series	
Citizen V and the V-Battalion	The Everlasting	#1–4	Mar 2002 – Jul 2002	limited series	
Citizen V and the V-Battalion	Battlebook: Streets of Fire		Nov 1998	one-shot	
Civil War	vol. 1	#1–7	Jul 2006 – Jan 2007	limited series	
Civil War	vol. 2	#1–5	Sep 2015 – Dec 2015	limited series; Secret Wars (2015) tie-in	
Civil War	Battle Damage Report	#1	Mar 2007	one-shot	
Civil War	Choosing Sides	#1	Dec 2006	one-shot	
Civil War	Chronicles	#1–12	Oct 2007 – Sep 2008	limited series	
Civil War	Files	#1	Nov 2006	one-shot	
Civil War	Front Line	#1–11	Aug 2006 – Apr 2007	limited series	
Civil War	House of M	#1–5	Nov 2008 – Mar 2009	limited series; also known as House of M: Civil War	
Civil War	Spider-Man Decisions	#1	Sep 2006	one-shot; also known as Civil War: Amazing Spider-Man - Decisions	
Civil War	The Confession	#1	May 2007	one-shot	
Civil War	The Initiative	#1	Apr 2007	one-shot	
Civil War	The Return	#1	Mar 2007	one-shot	
Civil War	Unmasked	#1–5	Jul 2026 – Nov 2026	limited series	
Civil War	War Crimes	#1	Feb 2007	one-shot	
Civil War	X-Men	#1–4	Sep 2006 – Dec 2006	limited series	
Civil War	Young Avengers & Runaways	#1–4	Sep 2006 – Dec 2006	limited series	
Civil War II		#0–8	Jul 2016 – Feb 2017	limited series	
Civil War II	Amazing Spider-Man	#1–4	Aug 2016 – Nov 2016	limited series	
Civil War II	Choosing Sides	#1–6	Aug 2016 – Nov 2016	limited series	
Civil War II	Gods of War	#1–4	Aug 2016 – Nov 2016	limited series	
Civil War II	Kingpin	#1–4	Aug 2016 – Nov 2016	limited series	
Civil War II	The Accused	#1	Oct 2016	one-shot	
Civil War II	The Fallen	#1	Oct 2016	one-shot	
Civil War II	The Oath	#1	Mar 2017	one-shot	
Civil War II	Ulysses	#1–3	Oct 2016 – Dec 2016	limited series	
Civil War II	X-Men	#1–4	Aug 2016 – Nov 2016	limited series	
ClanDestine	vol. 1	#1–12	Oct 1994 – Sep 1995		
ClanDestine	vol. 2	#1–5	Apr 2008 – Aug 2008	limited series	
ClanDestine	Preview	#1	Oct 1994	one-shot	
Classic X-Men		#1–45	Sep 1986 – Mar 1990	continued as X-Men Classic	
Claws		#1–3	Oct 2006 – Dec 2006	limited series	
Cloak and Dagger	vol. 1	#1–4	Oct 1983 – Jan 1984	limited series	
Cloak and Dagger	vol. 2	#1–11	Jul 1985 – Mar 1987		
Cloak and Dagger	vol. 3	#14–19	Oct 1990 – Aug 1991	continued from The Mutant Misadventures of Cloak and Dagger	
Cloak and Dagger	vol. 4	#1	May 2010	one-shot	
Cloak or Dagger		#1–3	Dec 2025 – Feb 2026	limited series; Age of Revelation tie-in	
Clobberin' Time		#1–5	May 2023 – Sep 2023	limited series	
The Clone Conspiracy	vol. 1	#1–5	Dec 2016 – Apr 2017	limited series	
The Clone Conspiracy	Omega	#1	May 2017	one-shot	
Clueless Spring Special		#1	May 1997	one-shot	
Code of Honor		#1–4	Jan 1997 – May 1997	limited series	
Codename: Genetix		#1–4	Jan 1993 – May 1993	limited series	
Codename: Spitfire		#10–13	Jul 1987 – Oct 1987	continued from Spitfire and the Troubleshooters	
Colossus		#1	Oct 1997	one-shot	
Colossus Battlebook: Streets of Fire		#1	Dec 1998	one-shot	
Combat Kelly	vol. 2	#1–9	Jun 1972 – Oct 1973	vol. 1 published by Atlas Comics	
Combat Zone: True Tales of GIs in Iraq			2005	graphic novel	
Comet Man		#1–6	Feb 1987 – Jul 1987	limited series	
Comic Book			1995	one-shot; also known as Spümco Comic Book	
Conan		#1–11	Aug 1995 – Jun 1996		
Conan	Battle For The Serpent Crown	#1–5	Apr 2020 – Nov 2020	limited series	
Conan	Classic	#1–11	Jun 1994 – Apr 1995		
Conan	Death Covered in Gold	#1–3	Sep 1999 – Nov 1999	limited series	
Conan	Flame and the Fiend	#1–3	Aug 2000 – Oct 2000	limited series	
Conan	Lord of the Spiders	#1–3	Mar 1998 – May 1998	limited series	
Conan	Return of Styrm	#1–3	Sep 1998 – Nov 1998	limited series	
Conan	River of Blood	#1–3	Jun 1998 – Aug 1998	limited series	
Conan	Saga	#1–97	May 1987 – Apr 1995		
Conan	Scarlet Sword	#1–3	Dec 1998 – Feb 1999	limited series	
Conan	Serpent War	#1–4	Feb 2020 – Mar 2020	limited series	
Conan 2099		#1	Jan 2020	one-shot	
Conan the Adventurer		#1–14	Jun 1994 – Jul 1995		
Conan the Barbarian	vol. 1	#1–275	Oct 1970 – Dec 1993		
Conan the Barbarian	vol. 1	Annual #1–12	1973 – 1987		
Conan the Barbarian	vol. 1	Giant-Size # 1–5	Sep 1974 – 1975		
Conan the Barbarian	vol. 2	#1–3	Jul 1997 – Oct 1997	limited series	
Conan the Barbarian	vol. 3	#1–25	Mar 2019 – Nov 2021		
Conan the Barbarian	Exodus	#1	Oct 2019	one-shot	
Conan the Barbarian	Movie Special	#1–2	Oct 1982 – Nov 1982	limited series; adaptation of 1982 movie	
Conan the Barbarian	The Usurper	#1–3	Dec 1997 – Feb 1998	limited series	
Conan the Destroyer		#1–2	Jan 1985 – Mar 1985	limited series; adaptation of 1985 movie	
Conan the King		#20–55	Jan 1984 – Nov 1989	continued from King Conan	
Conan the Savage		#1–10	Aug 1995 – May 1996		
Conan vs. Rune		#1	Nov 1995	one-shot	
Concert of Champions		#1	Jun 2025	one-shot	
Coneheads		#1–4	Jun 1994 – Sep 1994	limited series	
Conquest 2099		#1–5	Dec 2024 – Feb 2025	limited series	
Conspiracy		#1–2	Feb 1998 – Mar 1998	limited series	
Contagion		#1–5	Dec 2019	limited series	
Contest of Champions		#1–10	Dec 2015 – Sep 2016		
Contest of Champions II		#1–5	Sep 1999 – Nov 1999	limited series	
Cops: The Job		#1–4	Jun 1992 – Sep 1992	limited series	
Cosmic Ghost Rider	vol. 1	#1–5	Sep 2018 – Jan 2019	limited series	
Cosmic Ghost Rider	vol. 2	#1–5	May 2023 – Sep 2023	limited series	
Cosmic Ghost Rider Destroys Marvel History		#1–6	May 2019 – Oct 2019	limited series	
Cosmic Powers		#1–6	Mar 1994 – Aug 1994	limited series	
Cosmic Powers Unlimited		#1–5	May 1995 – May 1996	limited series	
Count Duckula		#1–15	Nov 1988 – Jan 1991	based on the 1988 TV series	
Crazy!	vol. 2	#1–3	Feb 1973 – Jun 1973	vol. 1 published by Atlas Comics	
Crazy!	vol. 3	#1	Dec 2019	one-shot	
Creatures on the Loose		#10–37	Mar 1971 – Sep 1975	continued from Tower of Shadows	
The Crew		#1–7	Jul 2003 – Jan 2004		
CrossGen Tales		#1	Jan 2023	one-shot	
Crypt of Shadows	vol. 1	#1–21	Jan 1973 – Nov 1975		
Crypt of Shadows	vol. 2	#1	Mar 2019	one-shot	
Crypt of Shadows	vol. 3	#1	Dec 2022	one-shot	
Crypt of Shadows	vol. 4	#1	Dec 2023	one-shot	
Crypt of Shadows	vol. 5	#1	Dec 2024	one-shot	
Cult of Carnage: Misery		#1–5	Jul 2023 – Nov 2023	limited series	
Curse of the Man-Thing	Avengers	#1	May 2021	one-shot; also known as Avengers: Curse of the Man-Thing; part 1 of 3	
Curse of the Man-Thing	Spider-Man	#1	Jun 2021	one-shot; also known as Spider-Man: Curse Of The Man-Thing; part 2 of 3	
Curse of the Man-Thing	X-Men	#1	Jul 2021	one-shot; also known as X-Men: Curse of the Man-Thing; part 3 of 3	
Curse of the Weird		#1–4	Dec 1993 – Mar 1994	limited series	
Cutting Edge		#1	Dec 1995	one-shot	
Cyberforce/X-Men		#1	Jan 2007	one-shot; co-published with Top Cow Productions	
Cyberspace 3000		#1–8	Jul 1993 – Feb 1994		
Cyblade/Ghost Rider		#1	Jan 1997	one-shot; co-published with Top Cow Productions and Image Comics	
Cyclops	vol. 1	#1–4	Oct 2001 – Jan 2002	limited series	
Cyclops	vol. 2	#1	May 2011	one-shot	
Cyclops	vol. 3	#1–12	Jul 2014 – Jul 2015		
Cyclops	vol. 4	#1–5	Apr 2026 – Aug 2026	limited series	

== See also ==
- List of Timely and Atlas Comics publications
- List of first appearances in Marvel Comics publications
- List of magazines released by Marvel Comics in the 1970s
- List of X-Men comics

For the titles from other Marvel imprints, see the following articles:

- Epic Comics
- Icon Comics
- Marvel Music
- Marvel UK - List of Marvel UK publications
- Razorline
- Star Comics
