= List of Marvel Comics publications (A) =

Marvel Comics is an American comic book company dating to 1961. This is a list of the publications it has released in its history under the "Marvel Comics" imprint. The list does not include collected editions; trade paperbacks; digital comics; free, promotional giveaways; sketchbooks; poster books or magazines, nor does it include series published by other Marvel imprints such as Epic, Icon or Star. It also does not include titles published by Marvel's pre-1961 predecessors Timely Comics and Atlas Comics.

- List of Marvel Comics publications (B–C)
- List of Marvel Comics publications (D–E)
- List of Marvel Comics publications (F–G)
- List of Marvel Comics publications (H–L)
- List of Marvel Comics publications (M)
- List of Marvel Comics publications (N–R)
- List of Marvel Comics publications (S)
- List of Marvel Comics publications (T–V)
- List of Marvel Comics publications (W–Z)

== 0–9 ==
Title	Series	Issues	Dates	Notes	Reference
5 Ronin		#1–5	May 2011	limited series	
15-Love		#1–3	Aug 2011 – Oct 2011	limited series	
The 100 Greatest Marvels of All Time		#1–10	Dec 2001	limited series	
100th Anniversary Special	Avengers	#1	Sep 2014	one-shot	
100th Anniversary Special	Fantastic Four	#1	Sep 2014	one-shot	
100th Anniversary Special	Guardians of the Galaxy	#1	Sep 2014	one-shot	
100th Anniversary Special	Spider-Man	#1	Sep 2014	one-shot	
100th Anniversary Special	X-Men	#1	Sep 2014	one-shot	
101 Ways to End the Clone Saga		#1	Jan 1997	one-shot	
411		#1–2	Jun 2003 – Jul 2003	limited series; solicited as a 3 issue series but only two were published	
1602: New World		#1–5	Oct 2005 – Jan 2006	limited series	
1602: Witch Hunter Angela		#1–4	Aug 2015 – Dec 2015	limited series; Secret Wars (2015) tie-in	
1776		#1–5	Jan 2026 – May 2026	limited series	
1872		#1–4	Sep 2015 – Dec 2015	limited series; Secret Wars (2015) tie-in	
2001: A Space Odyssey	vol. 1	#1	1976	one-shot; movie adaptation	
2001: A Space Odyssey	vol. 2	#1–10	Dec 1976 – Sep 1977		
2010		#1–2	Apr 1985 – May 1985	limited series; movie adaptation	
2020	Force Works	#1–3	Apr 2020 – Oct 2020	limited series; also known as Force Works 2020	
2020	Iron Age	#1	May 2020	one-shot; also known as Iron Age 2020	
2020	Ironheart	#1–2	Jul 2020 – Aug 2020	limited series; released digitally-only due to COVID-19 pandemic; originally intended for print release	
2020	iWolverine	#1–2	Sep 2020 – Oct 2020	limited series	
2020	Machine Man	#1–2	Apr 2020 – May 2020	limited series; also known as Machine Man 2020	
2020	Rescue	#1–2	May 2020 – Aug 2020	limited series; also known as Rescue 2020	
2099	Alpha	#1	Jan 2020	one-shot	
2099	Manifest Destiny	#1	Mar 1998	one-shot	
2099	Omega	#1	Feb 2020	one-shot	
2099	Special: The World of Doom	#1	May 1995	one-shot	
2099	Unlimited	#1–10	Jul 1993 – Oct 1995		
2099	World of Tomorrow	#1–8	Sep 1996 – Apr 1997		
2099 A.D.		#1	May 1995	one-shot	
2099 A.D.	Apocalypse	#1	Dec 1995	one-shot	
2099 A.D.	Genesis	#1	Jan 1996	one-shot	

== A ==
Title	Series	Issues	Dates	Notes	Reference
A+X		#1–18	Dec 2012 – May 2014	limited series	
A-Babies vs. X-Babies		#1	Dec 2012	one-shot	
A-Force	vol. 1	#1–5	Jul 2015 – Dec 2015	limited series; Secret Wars (2015) tie-in	
A-Force	vol. 2	#1–10	Mar 2016 – Dec 2016		
A-Next		#1–12	Oct 1998 – Sep 1999		
The A-Team		#1–3	Mar 1984 – May 1984	limited series	
A.X.E.	Avengers	#1	Nov 2022	one-shot	
A.X.E.	Death to the Mutants	#1–3	Oct 2022 – Dec 2022	limited series	
A.X.E.	Eternals	#1	Dec 2022	one-shot	
A.X.E.	Eve of Judgment	#1	Sep 2022	one-shot	
A.X.E.	Iron Fist	#1	Dec 2022	one-shot	
A.X.E.	Judgment Day	#1–6	Sep 2022 – Dec 2022	limited series	
A.X.E.	Judgment Day Omega	#1	Jan 2023	one-shot	
A.X.E.	Starfox	#1	Dec 2022	one-shot	
A.X.E.	X-Men	#1	Dec 2022	one-shot	
Abominations		#1–3	Dec 1996 – Feb 1997	limited series	
Absolute Carnage		#1–5	Oct 2019 – Jan 2020	limited series	
Absolute Carnage	Avengers	#1	Dec 2019	one-shot	
Absolute Carnage	Captain Marvel	#1	Jan 2020	one-shot	
Absolute Carnage	Immortal Hulk	#1	Dec 2019	one-shot	
Absolute Carnage	Lethal Protectors	#1–3	Oct 2019 – Dec 2019	limited series	
Absolute Carnage	Miles Morales	#1–3	Oct 2019 – Dec 2019	limited series	
Absolute Carnage	Scream	#1–3	Oct 2019 – Dec 2019	limited series	
Absolute Carnage	Separation Anxiety	#1	Oct 2019	one-shot	
Absolute Carnage	Symbiote of Vengeance	#1	Nov 2019	one-shot	
Absolute Carnage	Symbiote Spider-Man	#1	Nov 2019	one-shot	
Absolute Carnage	Vs. Deadpool	#1–3	Oct 2019 – Dec 2019	limited series	
Absolute Carnage	Weapon Plus	#1	Jan 2020	one-shot	
Adam: Legend of the Blue Marvel		#1–5	Jan 2009 – May 2009	limited series	
Adventures into Terror		#3–31	Apr 1951 – May 1954	previous issues were published by Atlas Comics	
Adventures of Captain America		#1–4	Sep 1991 – Jan 1992	limited series	
The Adventures of Cyclops and Phoenix		#1–4	May 1994 – Aug 1994	limited series	
Adventures of Snake Plissken		#1	Jan 1997	one-shot; tie-in to Escape from L.A. movie	
The Adventures of Spider-Man		#1–12	Apr 1996 – Mar 1997	limited series; based on the 1994 TV Series	
The Adventures of the Thing		#1–4	Apr 1992 – Jul 1992	limited series	
The Adventures of the X-Men		#1–12	Apr 1996 – Mar 1997	limited series; based on the 1990s TV Series	
Adventures on the Planet of the Apes		#1–11	Oct 1975 – Dec 1976		
Aero		#1–12	Sep 2019 – Dec 2020		
Age of Apocalypse	vol. 1	#1–14	May 2012 – Jun 2013		
Age of Apocalypse	vol. 2	#1–5	Sep 2015 – Dec 2015	limited series; Secret Wars (2015) tie-in	
Age of Apocalypse	The Chosen	#1	Apr 1995	one-shot	
Age of Conan	Belit	#1–5	May 2019 – Sep 2019	limited series	
Age of Conan	Valeria	#1–5	Oct 2019 – Feb 2020	limited series	
Age of Heroes		#1–4	Jul 2010 – Oct 2010	limited series	
Age of Innocence: The Rebirth of Iron Man		#1	Feb 1996	one-shot	
The Age of the Sentry		#1–6	Nov 2008 – May 2009	limited series	
Age of Ultron		#1–10, 10AI	May 2013 – Aug 2013	limited series	
Age of Ultron vs. Marvel Zombies		#1–4	Aug 2015 – Nov 2015	limited series; Secret Wars (2015) tie-in	
Age of X	Alpha	#1	Mar 2011	one-shot	
Age of X	Universe	#1–2	May 2011 – Jun 2011	limited series	
Age of X-Man	Alpha	#1	Mar 2019	one-shot	
Age of X-Man	Apocalypse and the X-Tracts	#1–5	May 2019 – Sep 2019	limited series	
Age of X-Man	Nextgen	#1–5	Apr 2019 – Aug 2019	limited series	
Age of X-Man	Omega	#1	Sep 2019	one-shot	
Age of X-Man	Prisoner X	#1–5	May 2019 – Sep 2019	limited series	
Age of X-Man	The Amazing Nightcrawler	#1–5	Apr 2019 – Aug 2019	limited series	
Age of X-Man	The Marvelous X-Men	#1–5	Apr 2019 – Aug 2019	limited series	
Age of X-Man	X-Tremists	#1–5	Apr 2019 – Aug 2019	limited series	
Agent Carter: S.H.I.E.L.D. 50th Anniversary		#1	Nov 2015	one-shot	
Agent X		#1–15	Sep 2002 – Dec 2003		
Agents of Atlas	vol. 1	#1–6	Oct 2006 – Mar 2007	limited series	
Agents of Atlas	vol. 2	#1–11	Apr 2009 – Nov 2009	Dark Reign tie-in initially; continued as on-going series	
Agents of Atlas	vol. 3	#1–5	Oct 2019 – Feb 2020	limited series	
Agents of S.H.I.E.L.D.		#1–10	Mar 2016 – Dec 2016		
Air Raiders		#1–5	Nov 1987 – Jul 1988		
ALF		#1–50	Mar 1988 – Feb 1992	based on the TV series	
ALF		Annual #1–3	1988 – 1990	based on the TV series	
ALF		Holiday Special #1–2	Winter 1989 – Winter 1990	based on the TV series	
ALF		Spring Special #1	Spring 1989	based on the TV series	
Alias	vol. 1	#1–28	Nov 2001 – Jan 2004		
Alias	vol. 2	#1–5	May 2026 – Sep 2026	limited series; also known as Alias: Red Band	
Alien	vol. 1	#1–12	May 2021 – Aug 2022		
Alien	vol. 1	Annual #1	2022		
Alien	vol. 2	#1–6	Nov 2022 – Apr 2023		
Alien	vol. 3	#1–5	Jun 2023 – Oct 2023	limited series; published under the 20th Century Studios imprint	
Alien	vol. 4	Annual #1	Dec 2023	one-shot; published under the 20th Century Studios imprint	
Alien	vol. 5	#1–4	Jan 2024 – Apr 2024	limited series; published under the 20th Century Studios imprint	
Alien	Black, White & Blood	#1–4	Apr 2024 – Jul 2024	limited series; published under the 20th Century Studios imprint	
Alien	King Killer	#1–5	Jun 2026 – Oct 2026	limited series; published under the 20th Century Studios imprint	
Alien	Paradiso	#1–5	Feb 2025 – Jun 2025	limited series; published under the 20th Century Studios imprint	
Alien	Romulus	#1	Dec 2024	one-shot; movie tie-in; published under the 20th Century Studios imprint	
Alien vs.	Captain America	#1–4	Jan 2026 – Apr 2026	limited series; published under the 20th Century Studios imprint	
Alien vs.	X-Men	#1–4	Nov 2026 – present	limited series; published under the 20th Century Studios imprint	
Aliens	Aftermath	#1	Sep 2021	one-shot	
Aliens	What If...?	#1–5	May 2024 – Sep 2024	limited series; published under the 20th Century Studios imprint	
Aliens vs. Avengers		#1–4	Oct 2024 – Aug 2025	limited series; published under the 20th Century Studios imprint	
All-New All-Different Avengers		#1–15	Jan 2016 – Dec 2016		
All-New All-Different Avengers		Annual #1	2016		
All-New, All-Different Marvel Universe		#1	May 2016	one-shot	
All-New, All Different Point One		#1	Dec 2015	one-shot	
All-New Captain America		#1–6	Jan 2015 – Jun 2015		
All-New Captain America		Special #1	Jul 2015		
All-New Captain America	Fear Him	#1–4	Apr 2015	limited series	
All-New Doop		#1–5	Jun 2014	limited series	
All-New Ghost Rider		#1–12	May 2014 – May 2015		
All-New Guardians of the Galaxy		#1–12	Jul 2017 – Dec 2017	continued as Guardians of the Galaxy vol. 5	
All-New Guardians of the Galaxy		Annual #1	Aug 2017	continued as Guardians of the Galaxy vol. 5	
All-New Hawkeye	vol. 1	#1–5	May 2015 – Nov 2015		
All-New Hawkeye	vol. 2	#1–6	Jan 2016 – Jun 2016		
All-New Inhumans		#1–11	Feb 2016 – Nov 2016		
All-New Invaders		#1–15	Mar 2014 – Apr 2015		
All-New Iron Manual		#1	May 2008	one-shot	
All-New Marvel Now! Point One		#1	Mar 2014	one-shot	
All-New Miracleman Annual		#1	Feb 2015	one-shot	
All-New Official Handbook of the Marvel Universe A to Z		#1–12	Jan 2006 – Dec 2006	limited series	
All-New Official Handbook of the Marvel Universe A to Z	Update	#1–4	2007	limited series	
All New Savage She-Hulk		#1–4	Jun 2009 – Sep 2009	limited series; Dark Reign tie-in	
All-New Spider-Gwen: The Ghost-Spider		#1–10	Oct 2025 – Jul 2026	also known as All-New Spider-Gwen: Ghost-Spider	
All-New Ultimates		#1–12	Jun 2014 – Mar 2015		
All-New Venom		#1–10	Feb 2025 – Nov 2025		
All-New Wolverine		#1–35	Jan 2016– Jul 2018		
All-New Wolverine		Annual #1	Oct 2016		
All-New X-Factor		#1–20	Mar 2014 – Mar 2015		
All-New X-Men	vol. 1	#1–41	Jan 2013 – Aug 2015		
All-New X-Men	vol. 1	Annual #1	Feb 2015		
All-New X-Men	vol. 1	Special #1	Dec 2013		
All-New X-Men	vol. 2	#1–19 1.MU	Jan 2016 – May 2017		
All-New X-Men	vol. 2	Annual #1	Jan 2017		
All-Out Avengers		#1–5	Nov 2022 – Mar 2023		
All Select Comics 70th Anniversary Special		#1	Sep 2009	one-shot based on the Timely Comics series	
All Winners Comics 70th Anniversary Special		#1	Oct 2009	one-shot based on the Timely Comics series	
All-Winners Squad: Band of Heroes		#1–5	Aug 2011 – Dec 2011	limited series; only 5 of announced 8 issues were published	
Alligator Loki		#1	Nov 2023	one-shot	
Alligator Loki	Holiday Special	#1	Feb 2025	one-shot	
Alpha: Big Time		#0.1, 1–5	Mar 2013 – Aug 2013	limited series	
Alpha Flight	vol. 1	#1–130	Aug 1983 – Mar 1994		
Alpha Flight	vol. 1	Annual #1–2	1986 – 1987		
Alpha Flight	vol. 1	Special #1	1992		
Alpha Flight	vol. 2	#1–20	Aug 1997 – Mar 1999		
Alpha Flight	vol. 2	Alpha Flight/Inhumans '98	1998	Annual	
Alpha Flight	vol. 3	#1–12	May 2004 – Apr 2005		
Alpha Flight	vol. 4	#0.1, 1–8	Jul 2011 – Mar 2012	Fear Itself tie-in initially; continued as on-going series	
Alpha Flight	vol. 5	#1–5	Oct 2023 – Feb 2024	limited series; Fall of X tie-in	
Alpha Flight	In the Beginning	#-1	Jul 1997	one-shot	
Alpha Flight	Special	#1–4	Jul 1991 – Oct 1991	limited series	
Alpha Flight	True North	#1	Nov 2019	one-shot	
Amadeus Cho 20th Anniversary Special		#1	Jul 2025	one-shot	
Amazing Adventures	vol. 2	#1–39	Aug 1970 – Nov 1976	vol. 1 was published by Atlas Comics	
Amazing Adventures	vol. 3	#1–14	Dec 1979 – Jan 1981		
Amazing Adventures	vol. 4	#1	1988	one-shot	
Amazing Fantasy	vol. 1	#15	Sep 1962	continues numbering from Amazing Adult Fantasy which was published by Atlas Comics	
Amazing Fantasy	vol. 2	#16–18	Dec 1995 – Mar 1996	continues numbering from vol. 1	
Amazing Fantasy	vol. 3	#1–20	Aug 2004 – Jun 2006		
Amazing Fantasy	vol. 4	#1–5	Sep 2021 – Feb 2022	limited series	
Amazing Fantasy	vol. 5	#1000	Oct 2022	one-shot	
Amazing High Adventure		#1–5	Aug 1984 – Dec 1986		
Amazing Mary Jane		#1–6	Dec 2019 – May 2020		
The Amazing Scarlet Spider		#1–2	Nov 1995 – Dec 1995	limited series	
Amazing Spider-Girl		#0–30	Dec 2006 – May 2009		
The Amazing Spider-Man (Note: Some titles in this grouping do not include The in the title.)	vol. 1	#1–441, -1	Mar 1963 – Nov 1998		
The Amazing Spider-Man	vol. 1	Annual #1–28	1964 – 1994		
The Amazing Spider-Man	vol. 1	'96, '97, '98	1996 – 1998		
The Amazing Spider-Man	vol. 1	Super Special #1	1995		
The Amazing Spider-Man	vol. 2	#1–58, 500–700, 654.1, 679.1, 699.1 700.1–700.5	Jan 1999 – Feb 2013; Feb 2014	issues #30-58 were dual numbered #471-499	
The Amazing Spider-Man	vol. 2	1999, 2000, 2001	1999 – 2001	Annuals	
The Amazing Spider-Man	vol. 2	Annual #35–39	2008 – 2012		
The Amazing Spider-Man	vol. 2	Giant-Size #1	Aug 1999		
The Amazing Spider-Man	vol. 3	#1–18, 1.1–1.5 16.1–20.1	Jun 2014 – Oct 2015		
The Amazing Spider-Man	vol. 3	Annual #1	2015		
The Amazing Spider-Man	vol. 3	Special #1	May 2015		
The Amazing Spider-Man	vol. 4	#1–32, 1.1–1.6	Dec 2015 – Nov 2017		
The Amazing Spider-Man	vol. 4	Annual #1	2017		
The Amazing Spider-Man	vol. 5	#789–801	Dec 2017 – Aug 2018	numbering continued from vol. 1	
The Amazing Spider-Man	vol. 5	Annual #42	2018		
The Amazing Spider-Man	vol. 6	#1–93, 16.HU, 18.HU–20.HU 50.LR–54.LR 78.BEY, 80.BEY, 88.BEY, 92.BEY	Sep 2018 – May 2022		
The Amazing Spider-Man	vol. 6	Annual #1–2	2018 – 2021		
The Amazing Spider-Man	vol. 7	#1–70 65.DEATHS, 68.DEATHS	Jun 2022 – May 2025		
The Amazing Spider-Man	vol. 7	Annual #1	2023		
The Amazing Spider-Man	vol. 7	Annual #1	2024	2nd Annual #1 published in this volume	
The Amazing Spider-Man	vol. 8	#1–35, 1000–	Jun 2025 – present	Took the combined numbering of previous volumes after issue #35	
The Amazing Spider-Man	vol. 8	Annual #1	2026		
The Amazing Spider-Man	Amazing Visions	#1	Dec 2026	one-shot	
The Amazing Spider-Man	Back in Quack	#1	Nov 2010	one-shot	
The Amazing Spider-Man	Blood Hunt	#1–3	Jul 2024 – Sep 2024	limited series	
The Amazing Spider-Man	Chaos in Calgary	#4	Feb 1993	part of 5-issue Canadian public service series	
The Amazing Spider-Man	Dead Ball	#5	Feb 1993	part of 5-issue Canadian public service series	
The Amazing Spider-Man	Double Trouble	#2	Feb 1993	part of 5-issue Canadian public service series	
The Amazing Spider-Man	Ends of the Earth	#1	Jul 2012	one-shot	
The Amazing Spider-Man	Extra!	#1–3	Sep 2008 – May 2009		
The Amazing Spider-Man	Family Business		2014	graphic novel	
The Amazing Spider-Man	Full Circle	#1	Dec 2019	one-shot	
The Amazing Spider-Man	Gang War First Strike	#1	Jan 2024	one-shot; Gang War tie-in	
The Amazing Spider-Man	Going Big	#1	Nov 2019	one-shot	
The Amazing Spider-Man	Halloween Special	#1	Dec 2026	one-shot	
The Amazing Spider-Man	Hit and Run	#3	Feb 1993	part of 5-issue Canadian public service series	
The Amazing Spider-Man	Infested	#1	Oct 2011	one-shot	
The Amazing Spider-Man	Sins Rising Prelude	#1	Sep 2020	one-shot	
The Amazing Spider-Man	Skating on Thin Ice	#1	Feb 1993	part of 5-issue Canadian public service series	
The Amazing Spider-Man	Soul of the Hunter	#1	Aug 1992	one-shot	
The Amazing Spider-Man	Spider-Versity	#1–5	Jun 2026 – Oct 2026	limited series	
The Amazing Spider-Man	The Daily Bugle	#1–2	Mar 2020 – Apr 2020	limited series; also known as Amazing Spider-Man: Daily Bugle; originally solicited as 5-issue series	
The Amazing Spider-Man	The Movie	#1–2	Aug 2012	limited series; movie adaptation	
The Amazing Spider-Man	The Movie Adaptation	#1–2	Mar 2014 – Apr 2014	limited series; movie adaptation	
The Amazing Spider-Man	The Sins Of Norman Osborn	#1	Nov 2020	one-shot	
The Amazing Spider-Man	Torn	#1–5	Dec 2025 – Apr 2026	limited series	
The Amazing Spider-Man	Who Am I?	#1	Jul 2014	one-shot	
The Amazing Spider-Man & Silk: The Spider(fly) Effect		#1–4	May 2016 – Aug 2016	limited series	
Amazing Spider-Man Family		#1–8	Oct 2008 – Sep 2009		
Amazing Spider-Man Presents	American Son	#1–4	Jul 2010 – Oct 2010	limited series	
Amazing Spider-Man Presents	Anti-Venom: New Ways to Live	#1–3	Nov 2009 – Feb 2010	limited series	
Amazing Spider-Man Presents	Black Cat	#1–4	Aug 2010 – Dec 2010	limited series	
Amazing Spider-Man Presents	Jackpot	#1–3	Mar 2010 – Jun 2010	limited series	
Amazing Spider-Man: Renew Your Vows	vol. 1	#1–5	Aug 2015 – Nov 2015	limited series; Secret Wars (2015) tie-in	
Amazing Spider-Man: Renew Your Vows	vol. 2	#1–23	Jan 2017 – Nov 2018		
Amazing Spider-Man/Venom: Death Spiral		#1	Apr 2026	one-shot	
Amazing Spider-Man/Venom: Death Spiral	Body Count	#1	Jul 2026	one-shot	
Amazing Spider-Man: Venom Inc.	Alpha	#1	Feb 2018	one-shot	
Amazing Spider-Man: Venom Inc.	Omega	#1	Mar 2018	one-shot	
The Amazing Venom		#1–5	Nov 2026 – present	limited series	
Amazing X-Men	vol. 1	#1–4	Mar 1995 – Jun 1995	limited series; Age of Apocalypse (1995) tie-in	
Amazing X-Men	vol. 2	#1–19	Jan 2014 – Jun 2015		
Amazing X-Men	vol. 2	Annual #1	Aug 2014		
Amazing X-Men	vol. 3	#1–3	Dec 2025 – Feb 2026	limited series; Age of Revelation tie-in	
America		#1–12	May 2017 – Feb 2018		
America Chavez: Made in the USA		#1–5	May 2021 – Oct 2021	limited series	
American Dream		#1–5	Jul 2008 – Sep 2008	limited series	
An American Tail: Fievel Goes West		#1–3	Jan 1992 – Feb 1992	limited series; movie adaptation	
Angel: Revelations		#1–5	Jul 2008 – Nov 2008	limited series	
Angela	Asgard's Assassin	#1–6	Feb 2015 – Jul 2015	limited series	
Angela	Queen of Hel	#1–7	Dec 2015 – Jun 2016		
Anita Blake: Circus of the Damned	The Charmer	#1–5	Jul 2010 – Dec 2010	limited series	
Anita Blake: Circus of the Damned	The Ingenue	#1–5	Mar 2011 – Oct 2011	limited series	
Anita Blake: Circus of the Damned	The Scoundrel	#1–5	Nov 2011 – May 2012	limited series	
Anita Blake: The Laughing Corpse	Book One	#1–5	Dec 2008 – Apr 2009	limited series	
Anita Blake: The Laughing Corpse	Executioner	#1–5	Dec 2009 – May 2010	limited series	
Anita Blake: The Laughing Corpse	Necromancer	#1–5	Jun 2009 – Nov 2009	limited series	
Anita Blake Vampire Hunter	The First Death	#1–2	Jul 2007 – Dec 2007	limited series	
Anita Blake Vampire Hunter	Guilty Pleasures	#1–12	Dec 2006 – Aug 2008	limited series	
Anita Blake Vampire Hunter	Guilty Pleasures Handbook	#1	2007	one-shot	
Annex		#1–4	Aug 1994 – Nov 1994	limited series	
Annie		#1–2	Oct 1982 – Nov 1982	limited series; movie adaptation	
Annihilation		#1–6	Oct 2006 – Mar 2007	limited series	
Annihilation	2099	#1–5	Sep 2024	weekly limited series	
Annihilation	Heralds of Galactus	#1–2	Apr 2007 – May 2007	limited series	
Annihilation	Nova	#1–4	Jun 2006 – Sep 2006	limited series	
Annihilation	Prologue	#1	May 2006	one-shot	
Annihilation	Ronan	#1–4	Jun 2006 – Sep 2006	limited series	
Annihilation	Saga	#1	May 2007	one-shot	
Annihilation	Silver Surfer	#1–4	Jun 2006 – Sep 2006	limited series	
Annihilation	Super-Skrull	#1–4	Jun 2006 – Sep 2006	limited series	
Annihilation	The Nova Corps Files		Oct 2006	one-shot	
Annihilation: Conquest		#1–6	Jan 2008 – Jun 2008	limited series	
Annihilation: Conquest	Prologue	#1	Aug 2007	one-shot	
Annihilation: Conquest	Quasar	#1–4	Sep 2007 – Dec 2007	limited series	
Annihilation: Conquest	Starlord	#1–4	Sep 2007 – Dec 2007	limited series	
Annihilation: Conquest	Wraith	#1–4	Sep 2007 – Dec 2007	limited series	
Annihilation: Scourge	Alpha	#1	Jan 2020	one-shot	
Annihilation: Scourge	Beta Ray Bill	#1	Feb 2020	one-shot	
Annihilation: Scourge	Fantastic Four	#1	Feb 2020	one-shot	
Annihilation: Scourge	Nova	#1	Feb 2020	one-shot	
Annihilation: Scourge	Omega	#1	Feb 2020	one-shot	
Annihilation: Scourge	Silver Surfer	#1	Feb 2020	one-shot	
Annihilators		#1–4	May 2011 – Aug 2011	limited series	
Annihilators	Earthfall	#1–4	Nov 2011 – Feb 2012	limited series	
Ant-Man	vol. 1	#1–5	Mar 2015 – Jul 2015		
Ant-Man	vol. 1	Annual #1	Sep 2015		
Ant-Man	vol. 2	#1–5	Apr 2020 – Oct 2020	limited series	
Ant-Man	vol. 3	#1–4	Sep 2022 – Dec 2022	limited series	
Ant-Man	Larger Than Life	#1	Jun 2015	one-shot	
Ant-Man	Last Days	#1	Oct 2015	one-shot; Secret Wars (2015) tie-in	
Ant-Man and the Wasp	vol. 1	#1–3	Jan 2011 – Mar 2011	limited series	
Ant-Man and the Wasp	vol. 2	#1–5	Aug 2018 – Sep 2018	limited series	
Ant-Man and the Wasp	Living Legends	#1	Aug 2018	one-shot	
Ant-Man's Big Christmas		#1	Feb 2000	one-shot	
Apache Skies		#1–4	Sep 2002 – Dec 2002	limited series	
Araña: The Heart of the Spider		#1–12	Mar 2005 – Feb 2006		
Archangel		#1	Feb 1996	one-shot	
Ares		#1–5	Mar 2006 – Jul 2006	limited series	
Armor Wars		#1/2, 1–5	Jun 2015 – Nov 2015	limited series; Secret Wars (2015) tie-in	
Arrgh!		#1–5	Dec 1974 – Sep 1975		
Asgardians of the Galaxy		#1–10	Nov 2018 – Aug 2019	limited series; Infinity Wars & The War of the Realms tie-in	
Askani'son		#1–4	Jan 1996 – May 1996	limited series	
Assault on New Olympus Prologue		#1	Jan 2010	one-shot	
The Astonishing Ant-Man		#1–13	Dec 2015 – Dec 2016		
Astonishing Iceman		#1–5	Oct 2023 – Feb 2024	limited series; Fall of X tie-in	
Astonishing Miles Morales: Spider-Man – The Art of Thwip		#1	Jul 2026	one-shot	
The Astonishing Spider-Man & Wolverine		#1–6	Jul 2010 – Jul 2011	limited series	
Astonishing Tales	vol. 1	#1–36	Aug 1970 – Jul 1976		
Astonishing Tales	vol. 2	#1–6	Apr 2009 – Sep 2009		
Astonishing Thor		#1–5	Jan 2011 – Sep 2011	limited series	
Astonishing X-Men	vol. 1	#1–4	Mar 1995 – Jun 1995	limited series; Age of Apocalypse (1995) tie-in	
Astonishing X-Men	vol. 2	#1–3	Sep 1999 – Nov 1999	limited series	
Astonishing X-Men	vol. 3	#1–68	Jul 2004 – Dec 2013		
Astonishing X-Men	vol. 3	Annual #1	Jan 2013		
Astonishing X-Men	vol. 3	Giant-Size #1	Jul 2008		
Astonishing X-Men	vol. 4	#1–17	Sep 2017 – Jan 2019		
Astonishing X-Men	vol. 4	Annual #1	Oct 2018		
Astonishing X-Men	Ghost Boxes	#1–2	Dec 2008 – Jan 2009	limited series	
Astonishing X-Men	Saga	#1	Mar 2006	one-shot	
Astonishing X-Men	Xenogenesis	#1–5	Jul 2010 – Apr 2011	limited series	
Atlantis Attacks		#1–5	Mar 2020 – Feb 2021	limited series	
Atlas		#1–5	Jul 2010 – Nov 2010		
Avataars: Covenant of the Shield		#1–3	Sep 2000 – Nov 2000	limited series	
The Avengers	vol. 1	#1–402	Sep 1963 – Sep 1996		
The Avengers	vol. 1	Annual #1–23	Sep 1967 – 1994		
The Avengers	vol. 1	Giant-Size #1–5	Aug 1974 – 1975		
The Avengers	vol. 2	#1–13	Nov 1996 – Nov 1997		
The Avengers	vol. 3	#1–84, 500–503	Feb 1998 – Dec 2004	issues #41–84 are dual numbered as #456–499	
The Avengers	vol. 3	Avengers/Squadron Supreme '98	1998	Annual	
The Avengers	vol. 3	1999, 2000, 2001	1999 – 2001	Annuals	
The Avengers	vol. 4	#1–34, 12.1, 24.1	Jul 2010 – Jan 2013		
The Avengers	vol. 4	Annual #1	2012		
The Avengers	vol. 5	#1–44, 34.1, 34.2	Feb 2013 – Apr 2015		
The Avengers	vol. 5	Annual #1	2014		
The Avengers	vol. 6	#0–11, 1.1–5.1 1.MU	Dec 2016 – Nov 2017		
The Avengers	vol. 7	#672–690	Dec 2017 – Jun 2018	numbering continued from vol. 1	
The Avengers	vol. 8	#1–66	Jul 2018 – May 2023		
The Avengers	vol. 8	Annual #1	2021		
The Avengers	vol. 9	#1–36	Jul 2023 – May 2026		
The Avengers	vol. 9	Annual #1	2023		
The Avengers	vol. 9	Annual #1	2024	2nd Annual #1 published in this volume	
The Avengers	vol. 10	#1–	Jan 2027 – present		
The Avengers	1959	#1–5	Dec 2011 – Mar 2012	limited series	
The Avengers	1,000,000 BC	#1	Oct 2022	one-shot	
The Avengers	A.I.	#1–12	Sep 2013 – Jun 2014		
The Avengers	Anniversary Magazine	#1	Nov 1993	one-shot	
The Avengers	Arena	#1–18	Feb 2013 – Jan 2014		
The Avengers	Armageddon	#1–5	Aug 2026 – Dec 2026	limited series	
The Avengers	Assemble	#1–5	Nov 2024 – Mar 2025	limited series	
The Avengers	Beyond	#1–5	May 2023 – Sep 2023	limited series	
The Avengers	Casebook 1999		Dec 1999	one-shot	
The Avengers	Celestial Quest	#1–8	Nov 2001 – Jun 2002	limited series	
The Avengers	Classic	#1–12	Aug 2007 – Jul 2008		
The Avengers	Edge of Infinity	#1	Jun 2019	one-shot	
The Avengers	Endless Wartime		2013	graphic novel	
The Avengers	Fairy Tales	#1–4	Mar 2008 – Jun 2008	limited series	
The Avengers	Finale	#1	Jan 2005	one-shot	
The Avengers	Giant-Size 2008	#1	Feb 2008	one-shot	
The Avengers	Halloween Special	#1	Dec 2018	one-shot	
The Avengers	Inc.	#1–5	Nov 2023 – Mar 2024		
The Avengers	Infinity	#1–4	Sep 2000 – Dec 2000	limited series	
The Avengers	Log	#1	Feb 1994	one-shot	
The Avengers	Loki Unleashed!	#1	Nov 2019	one-shot	
The Avengers	Mech Strike	#1–5	Apr 2021 – Sep 2021	limited series	
The Avengers	Millennium	#1–4	Jun 2015	limited series	
The Avengers	Next	#1–5	Jan 2007 – Mar 2007	limited series	
The Avengers	No More Bullying	#1	Mar 2015	one-shot	
The Avengers	No Road Home	#1–10	Apr 2019 – Jun 2019	limited series	
The Avengers	Now!	Handbook #1	Feb 2015	one-shot	
The Avengers	Operation Hydra	#1	Jun 2015	one-shot	
The Avengers	Prime	#1–5	Aug 2010 – Mar 2011	limited series	
The Avengers	Rage of Ultron		2015	graphic novel	
The Avengers	Roll Call	#1	Apr 2012	one-shot	
The Avengers	Shards of Infinity	#1	Jun 2018	one-shot	
The Avengers	Solo	#1–5	Dec 2011 – Apr 2012	limited series	
The Avengers	Spotlight (1989)	#21–40	Aug 1989 – Jan 1991	formerly Solo Avengers	
The Avengers	Spotlight (2010)		Jun 2010	one-shot	
The Avengers	Strike File	#1	Jan 1994	one-shot	
The Avengers	Tech-On	#1–6	Oct 2021 – Apr 2022	limited series	
The Avengers	The Crossing	#1	Sep 1995	one-shot	
The Avengers	The Enemy Within	#1	Jul 2013	one-shot	
The Avengers	The Origin	#1–5	Jun 2010 – Oct 2010	limited series	
The Avengers	The Terminatrix Objective	#1–4	Sep 1993 – Dec 1993	limited series	
The Avengers	The Ultron Imperative	#1	Nov 2001	one-shot	
The Avengers	Timeslide		Feb 1996	one-shot	
The Avengers	Twilight	#1–6	Mar 2024 – Jul 2024	limited series	
The Avengers	Ultron Forever	#1	Jun 2015	one-shot	
The Avengers	Undercover	#1–10	May 2014 – Nov 2014		
The Avengers	United They Stand	#1–7	Nov 1999 – Jun 2000	based on the 1999 animated series	
The Avengers	Universe	#1–6	Apr 2000 – Jan 2001	limited series	
The Avengers	Unplugged	#1–6	Oct 1995 – Aug 1996	limited series	
The Avengers	War Across Time	#1–5	Mar 2023 – Jul 2023	limited series	
The Avengers	World	#1–21	Mar 2014 – Jul 2015		
The Avengers	X-Sanction	#1–4	Feb 2012 – May 2012	limited series	
Avengers Academy		#1–39; 14.1	Aug 2010 – Jan 2013		
Avengers Academy		Giant-Size #1	Jul 2011		
Avengers Academy	Assemble	#1	Aug 2025	one-shot	
The Avengers and Power Pack Assemble!		#1–4	Jun 2006 – Sep 2006	limited series	
Avengers & the Infinity Gauntlet		#1–4	Oct 2010 – Jan 2011	limited series	
Avengers & X-Men: Axis		#1–9	Dec 2014 – Feb 2015	limited series	
Avengers Assemble	vol. 1	#1	Jul 2010	one-shot	
Avengers Assemble	vol. 2	#1–25	May 2012 – May 2014		
Avengers Assemble	vol. 2	Annual #1	2013		
Avengers Assemble	Alpha	#1	Jan 2023	one-shot	
Avengers Assemble	Omega	#1	Jun 2023	one-shot	
Avengers Assemble	Season Two	#1–16	Jan 2015 – Apr 2016		
Avengers: Earth's Mightiest Heroes	vol. 1	#1–8	Jan 2005 – Apr 2005	limited series	
Avengers: Earth's Mightiest Heroes	vol. 2	#1–8	Jan 2007 – May 2007	limited series	
Avengers: Earth's Mightiest Heroes	vol. 3	#1–4	Jan 2011 – Apr 2011	limited series	
Avengers Forever	vol. 1	#1–12	Dec 1998 – Feb 2000	limited series	
Avengers Forever	vol. 2	#1–15	Feb 2022 – May 2023		
Avengers/Invaders		#1–12	Jul 2008 – Aug 2009	limited series; co-published with Dynamite Entertainment	
Avengers/Invaders		Giant-Size #1	2008	one-shot	
Avengers of The Wastelands		#1–5	Mar 2020 – Nov 2020	limited series	
Avengers Origins	Ant-Man & the Wasp	#1	Jan 2012	one-shot	
Avengers Origins	Luke Cage	#1	Jan 2012	one-shot	
Avengers Origins	The Scarlet Witch & Quicksilver	#1	Jan 2012	one-shot	
Avengers Origins	Thor	#1	Jan 2012	one-shot	
Avengers Origins	Vision	#1	Jan 2012	one-shot	
Avengers Standoff	Assault on Pleasant Hill Alpha	#1	May 2016	one-shot	
Avengers Standoff	Assault on Pleasant Hill Omega	#1	Jun 2016	one-shot	
Avengers Standoff	Welcome to Pleasant Hill	#1	Apr 2016	one-shot	
Avengers: The Children's Crusade		#1–9	Sep 2010 – May 2012	limited series	
Avengers: The Children's Crusade	Young Avengers	#1	May 2011	one-shot	
Avengers: The Initiative		#1–35	Jun 2007 – Jun 2010		
Avengers: The Initiative		Annual #1	Jan 2008		
Avengers: The Initiative		Special #1	Jan 2009		
Avengers: The Initiative	Featuring Reptil	#1	May 2009	one-shot	
Avengers/Thunderbolts		#1–6	May 2004 – Sep 2004	limited series	
Avengers Two: Wonder Man & Beast		#1–3	May 2000 – Jul 2000	limited series	
Avengers vs.		#1	Jul 2015	one-shot; stylized as Avengers Vs	
Avengers vs.	Atlas	#1–4	Mar 2010 – Jun 2010	limited series	
Avengers vs.	Infinity	#1	Jan 2016	one-shot; stylized as Avengers Vs	
Avengers vs.	Pet Avengers	#1–4	Dec 2010 – Mar 2011	limited series	
Avengers vs.	X-Men	#0–12	May 2012 – Dec 2012	limited series	
Avengers West Coast		#48–102	Sep 1989 – Jan 1994	formerly West Coast Avengers	
Avengers West Coast		Annual #5–8	1990 – 1993	formerly West Coast Avengers	
Avenging Spider-Man		#1–22; 15.1	Jan 2012 – Aug 2013		
Avenging Spider-Man		Annual #1	Dec 2012		
AVX: Consequences		#1–5	Dec 2012 – Jan 2013	limited series	
Axis	Carnage	#1–3	Dec 2014 – Feb 2015	limited series	
Axis	Hobgoblin	#1–3	Dec 2014 – Feb 2015	limited series	
Axis	Revolutions	#1–4	Dec 2014 – Feb 2015	limited series	

== See also ==
- List of Timely and Atlas Comics publications
- List of first appearances in Marvel Comics publications
- List of magazines released by Marvel Comics in the 1970s
- List of X-Men comics

For the titles from other Marvel imprints, see the following articles:

- Epic Comics
- Icon Comics
- Marvel Music
- Marvel UK - List of Marvel UK publications
- Razorline
- Star Comics
