= Ballistics (disambiguation) =

Ballistics may refer to:

== Science ==
- Ballistics, the science that deals with the motion, behavior, and effects of projectiles
  - Forensic ballistics, the science of analyzing firearm usage in crimes
  - Internal ballistics, the study of the processes accelerating a projectile
  - Transition ballistics, the study of the projectile's behavior when it leaves the barrel
  - External ballistics, the study of the passage of the projectile through space or the air
  - Terminal ballistics, the study of the interaction of a projectile with its target
- Ballistic conduction, conduction of electricity with negligible charge scattering
- Ballistic movement of muscles in an animal

== Combat ==
- Ballistic missile, a missile that follows a sub-orbital flightpath
- Ballistic knife, a specialized combat knife with a detachable, self-propelled blade
- Ballistic shield, a shield meant to protect the user from bullets

== Arts and media ==
=== Comics ===
- Ballistic (Image Comics), a comic character of Top Cow Productions
- Ballistic (DC Comics), a DC Comic Book Character

=== Film ===
- Ballistic: Ecks vs. Sever, a 2002 film
- Ballistic (film), a 2025 film

=== Literature ===
- Ballistic, a 2011 novel by Mark Greaney
- Ballistics, a 2013 novel by D. W. Wilson

=== Video games ===
- Puzz Loop, a 1998 video game by Mitchell Corporation, known as Ballistic outside Japan
- Ballistics (video game), a 2001 video game by GRIN
- Ballistic, a playable character in the 2019 video game Apex Legends
- Fortnite Ballistic, a former game mode in Fortnite
