= Fury (2001 series) =

Marvel Comics miniseries by Garth Ennis

- Cover art by Bill Sienkiewicz

Publication information
- Publisher: Marvel Comics
- Schedule: Monthly
- Format: Limited series
- Genre: Spy, war
- Publication date: 2001
- No. of issues: 6
- Main character: Nick Fury

Creative team
- Created by: Garth Ennis
- Written by: Garth Ennis
- Artist(s): Darick Robertson; Jimmy Palmiotti
- Penciller: Darick Robertson
- Inker: Jimmy Palmiotti
- Colorist: Avalon Studios
- Editor: Axel Alonso

Fury is a 2001 six issue miniseries about Nick Fury written by Garth Ennis. The series was published under Marvel's MAX imprint and featured much harder violence and explicit material than was common at the time. This caused some controversy among fans and comic creators. The series takes place outside of main Marvel comics continuity and is interconnected with other series written by Garth Ennis under the Max imprint. It was followed by a prequel and a sequel.

== Publication history ==
Three issues of the series were published in Germany in 2002 by Panini.

== Plot ==
After the end of the Cold War Fury finds himself lost and incapable of enjoying himself like he used to when going to war. S.H.I.E.L.D. has tried to put him into a non-combat position and he feels bored and unneeded in the modern age.

Fury's luck begins to turn when he has a chance encounter at a bar with a former H.Y.D.R.A. operative named Rudi Gargarin. The two lament about the good old days when men could actually get their hands dirty. Gargarin proposes they quietly invade a seemingly non political island and run it into an all out war for their own benefit to get that feeling back again. Fury contemplates the idea but ultimately rejects it.

After Fury has sex with several Asian prostitutes his apartment is swarmed by assassins sent by Gargarin. Fury kills them all and decides to go to war. He forces his way through S.H.I.E.L.D and builds a small team of elite soldiers who will do precisely what he says and then goes with them to the island. The soldiers and Fury arrive with a relatively bloodless plan but soon that all flies out of the window. By the end Fury has to kill the last enemy by strangling him with his own intestines.

== Reception ==
Writer-editor Stan Lee, a co-creator of Nick Fury, was critical of the extreme violence and gore of this new series: "I don't know why they're doing that. I don't think that I would do those kinds of stories." According to reports, actor George Clooney similarly condemned the books, the macabre contents of which prompted him to drop out of talks regarding portraying Fury in a then upcoming Marvel film. Gus Lubin of the Business Insider stated that "Fury is a smart and enjoyable comic, which portrays the spy chief as an aging "cold warrior" who on some deep level wants nothing more than to get his hands dirty again. Still, it's understandable that this portrayal of the character scared Clooney away." Clooney's dropout reportedly caused Avi Arad, the head of Marvel's West Coast division who is heavily involved in Marvel's film deals, to wield a harder grip on what content Marvel writers were allowed to publish.

Greg Burgas of Comic Book Resources described the book as a rather odd tribute to the character of Nick Fury. As the years went by the book reached a near legendary status among comic book readers. Ennis himself has expressed that he is very happy with the book and feels that it is in his top 10 favorite series he has written. He also praised his artist Robertson and expressed gratefulness to his editorial team which he felt let him do whatever he wanted with the work. He stated that he would never change a single thing about it. In an interview in 2024, Ennis said that he didn't know if the story about George Clooney was true, but that it didn't seem to affect his relationship with Marvel.

== Followups ==
Ennis wrote a prequel mini series in 2006 named Fury: Peacemaker and a sequel series named Fury: My War Gone By from 2012 to 2013.

== Prints ==
=== Issues ===
No.	Title	Cover date	Comic Book Roundup rating	Estimated sales (first month)
#1	Be Careful What You Wish For	November 2001	—N/a	56,308, ranked 19th in North American
#2	Apocalypse Shortly	December 2001	—N/a	44,578, ranked 36th in North American
#3	Here Comes the Pain	January 2002	—N/a	45,051, ranked 32nd in North American
#4	See You and Raise	February 2002	—N/a	42,884, ranked 34th in North American
#5	On Your Guns	March 2002	—N/a	40,386, ranked 37th in North American
#6	The Man Who Loved the War	April 2002	—N/a	38,494, ranked 38th in North American

=== Collected editions ===
Title	Format	Material collected	Pages	Publication date	ISBN	Estimated sales
Fury	Trade paperback (TPB)	Fury (2001) #1-6	144	April, 2002	0785108785; 978-0785108788	3,901, ranked 12th of the top-selling trade paperbacks in North America

== See also ==
- 2001 in comics
