= Captain America and Nick Fury: The Otherworld War =

2001 comic book one-shot

- Cover of the issue.

Publication information
- Publisher: Marvel Comics
- Genre: Spy, superhero
- Publication date: October 2001
- No. of issues: 1
- Main character(s): Captain America; Nick Fury

Creative team
- Written by: Peter K. Hogan
- Penciller: Leonardo Manco
- Inker: Leonardo Manco
- Letterer: Jonathan 'Jon' Babcock
- Colorist(s): Digital Chameleon; Mariana Manco
- Editor(s): Bobbie E. Chase; Andrew Lis; Joe Quesada

Captain America and Nick Fury: The Otherworld War is a 68-page, one-shot comic book, published by Marvel Comics in 2001.

== Publication history ==
The comic was written by Peter K. Hogan and published in October 2001.

== Plot ==
The story takes place during World War II, where Captain America and Nick Fury join forces to take out the head of Hydra, Red Skull, who has stolen a mysterious secret weapon. The Nazis trigger a gateway to the Dark Dimension, and so Captain America and Nick Fury must face Dormammu, an extra-dimensional mutant, born to a race of powerful beings made of pure energy known as The Faltine.

== Reception ==
Upon its release, the book was the highest-selling trade paperback in North America, selling 17,785 copies in August 2001.

SuperMegaMonkey of Comics Chronology stated that "the art is decently good, but that the story leaves things to desire". THE DAILY P.O.P's reviewer opined that "The artwork by Leonardo Manco is quite stunning and fits the level of drama perfectly as Hogan's script is both entertaining and subtle.

== See also ==
- 2001 in comics
