= Fury: My War Gone By =

Limited series by Marvel Comics

- Cover to the 2014 full collected edition of the series, art by Dave Johnson.

Publication information
- Publisher: Marvel Comics
- Schedule: Monthly
- Format: Limited series
- Genre: Spy, war
- Publication date: 2012
- No. of issues: 13
- Main character: Nick Fury

Creative team
- Created by: Garth Ennis; Goran Parlov
- Written by: Garth Ennis
- Artist(s): Goran Parlov; Dave Johnson
- Penciller: Goran Parlov
- Inker: Goran Parlov
- Letterer: Rob Steen
- Colorist: Lee Loughridge
- Editor(s): Axel Alonso; Sebastian Girner; Jennifer Grünwald; Nicholas Albert 'Nick' Lowe; Nelson Ribeiro; Alex Starbuck

Fury: My War Gone By, also known as Fury MAX or Fury MAX: Cold Warrior, is a 2012-2013 thirteen issue comic book limited series written by Garth Ennis and published by Marvel Comics. The series follow the character of Nick Fury during his military career under the course of the 20th century after the Second World War, when Fury participated in most of the United States' Cold War initiatives around the globe. Like most of Ennis's previous works on characters that are mainly figures in the world of superheroes so does the series do away with those elements, it instead fixate on the real life dealings of soldiers and spies in historical situations. It is a sequel to the 2001 series Fury and the 2006 series Fury: Peacemaker, both also written by Garth Ennis. The comic was drawn by Goran Parlov who had previously worked with Ennis on his Punisher series. The series garnered decent sales and critical acclaim.

== Development ==
Ennis has been a proponent of war comics since his youth, as he felt they had more meaning over the general superhero publications that Marvel Comics published most of the time. He felt that the character of Nick Fury reminded him of the series he read as a child and that was of greater interest for him to write. Before My War Gone By Ennis wrote two other Fury series (Fury in 2001 and Fury: Peacemaker in 2006) as well as including his incarnation of the character in his Punisher run. In Ennis opinion so is his interpretation of Fury in the series intended to be the original character which debuted in Sgt. Fury and his Howling Commandos from 1963.

Ennis has expressed that his original 2001 Fury series is one of his personal favorites and that he had had the idea for My War Gone By for a long time, at least since the end of his last Punisher series. When some of Ennis close friends rose within the Marvel hierarchy he took the opportunity to express his interest in doing another Fury comic. The series was meant to be the origin of his version of Nick Fury, to show how he became a bitter and angry old man that showed up in Ennis Punisher comics.

== Publication history ==
The series was published under Marvel's Max imprint. In North America the first and second issues were both released in May 2012, issue three to six were released monthly. No issue was released in October or November 2012. From issue seven on in December 2012 the series was again published monthly. At some point during the publication of the series Marvel used the title Fury Max: Cold Warrior to refer to the series, which was used at Marvel.com. Since then three collected editions have been published in English; two trade paperback, the first one which collects issues 1 to 6 and the second one which collects issues 7 to 13, known as My War Gone By Vol. 1 and 2, released in 2012 and 2013 respectively. The third collection is a hardcover and includes all thirteen issues and was named Fury: My War Gone By and released in 2014.

A French language version was released by Panini Comics in 2013 named Fury: D'une Guerre à L'autre, (translation: From War to War or From One War to Another). A second one also released by Panini in 2013 was named A la Guerre Comme à la Guerre (translation: In War As In War).

== Plot ==
The story is split up in four different three issue arcs with a final separate issue at the end, the first arc concerns Fury's time working for the military in French Indochina (modern day Vietnam) by a politician named McCuskey. Fury is to assess the situation and get an understanding of the lay of the land and how America could potentially influence the situation on behalf of the French and their own best interests. Fury is given some help from a C.I.A. agent named Hatherly and begins a relationship with McCuskey's assistant, Shirley. The second arc takes place in Cuba in 1961 when Fury attempted to help assassinate Fidel Castro. The third arc takes place in the 1970s as Fury is dragged back into Vietnam at the height of the US involvement. The arc features more assassination attempts and Fury enlists the help from a Marine Corps sniper named Frank Castle. The final three-issue arc is set in Nicaragua in 1984, where he encounters a soldier who goes by the name of Barracuda. The final issue features Fury contemplating his life and his choice to dedicate his entire adulthood to going to war.

Ennis' version of the character has no connections to the superhero shared universe Fury usually occupies together with characters as The Avengers and X-Men but instead focuses on him in a real world environment and features no appearances from other Marvel characters, outside of Frank Castle, that Ennis did not create himself in his other MAX series. There are no supernatural elements in My War Gone By and costumed vigilantes do not appear to be a feature of the world at all. The spy organization S.H.I.E.L.D. is also largely omitted from the work, as Fury is portrayed as a soldier and CIA agent during his whole life in the book. However, the events of the miniseries are alluded in Original Sin #5.

== Reception ==
=== Sales ===
All thirteen issues were priced at 3.99 dollars their first month, and all sold between 20,620 and 12,426 copies. The first collected edition was priced at 19.99 dollars and sold an estimated 2477 copies during its first month and was ranked 20th on the trade paperback listing by The Comics Chronicles, on its second month it sold 391 and was ranked 271 on the list. The second collected edition was also priced at 19.99 and sold an estimated 1,888 copies in August 2013 and was ranked 37. The hardcover full collection was priced at 34.99 dollars and sold an estimated 1,304 copies while being ranked at 70 during August 2014.

=== Critical response ===
The series holds an average rating of 8.2 by 16 critics on the review aggregation website Comic Book Roundup.

Fellow writer Brian K Vaughan, called it the best thing Marvel has done in the last fifty years

John Parker of the ComicsAlliance praised the series, stating "Ennis, renowned for his knowledge of military history, fills “My War Gone By” with real-world facts that will chill your flowery golden heart, and at the very least you will walk away from this book with a near-encyclopedic understanding of covert American screw-ups, and perhaps a healthy amount of hate for the Iron Fist of Democracy." Andrew Young of Geek Hard said the series was one of the best Nick Fury stories ever. Zak Wojnar of Screen Rant said the villain Barracuda's actions were too vile and horrific to recount when describing the character, but that Barracuda is a character who needs to be portrayed on screen. Mark Peters of Salon said that unlike Ennis's other series, which are puffy and ridiculous in a good way, My War Gone By is realistic and somber. He also expressed that the series was one of the best Nick Fury stories written and one of the best pieces of cold war fiction of any medium. He stated that it as a very clever usage of the character that takes him away from the world of mainstream Marvel superheroes. Peters described the Fury in the series as an old, grizzled soldier who, much like America is addicted to war.

== Prints ==
=== Issues ===
| No. | Title | Cover date | Comic Book Roundup rating | Estimated sales (first month) |
|---|---|---|---|---|
| #1 | "While All the Planet's Little Wars Start Joining Hands" | July 2012 | 7.8 by four professional critics. | 20,620, ranked 124th in North America |
| #2 | "Number One Fucky" | July 2012 | 7.8 by two professional critics. | 19,021, ranked 130th in North America |
| #3 | "And Some People Left For Heaven Without Warning" | August 2012 | —N/a | 17,152, ranked 128th in North America |
| #4 | "If We Was Meant To Be Cowboys" | September 2012 | —N/a | 16,329, ranked 135th in North America |
| #5 | "Get Ready To Shed A Tear" | October 2012 | 8.5 by two professional critics. | 15,646, ranked 153th in North America |
| #6 | "An' Go To Your Gawd As A Soldier" | November 2012 | —N/a | 14,646, ranked 146th in North America |
| #7 | "Mister Chained Blue Lightning" | February 2013 | 8.0 by one professional critic. | 14,345, ranked 145th in North America |
| #8 | "The Judgment of Your Peers" | March 2013 | 8.2 by two professional critics. | 13,703, ranked 140th in North America |
| #9 | "Nobody Does it Quite the Way You Do" | April 2013 | 7.5 by two professional critics. | 13,283, ranked 154th in North America |
| #10 | "The Sunny Slopes of Long Ago" | May 2013 | 8.0 by one professional critic. | 13,096, ranked 155th in North America |
| #11 | "My Brother Earned His Medals at My Lai in Vietnam" | June 2013 | 8.0 by one professional critic. | 12,937, ranked 156th in North America |
| #12 | "Before Man Was, War Waited" | July 2013 | —N/a | 12,694, ranked 168th in North America |
| #13 | "But Yet We'll Write a Final Rhyme While Waiting Crucifixion" | August 2013 | 9.8 by one professional critic. | 12,426, ranked 165th in North America |

=== Collected editions ===
| Title [Tagline] | Format | Material collected | Pages | Publication date | ISBN | Estimated sales (North America) [Trades] | Rated |
|---|---|---|---|---|---|---|---|
| My War Gone By Vol. 1 | Trade paperback (TPB) | Fury MAX #1-6 | 144 | December 19, 2012 | 0785157778; 978-0785157779 | Combined sales: 2868 | EC (Note: Explicit Content) |
| My War Gone By Vol. 2 | TPB | Fury MAX #7-13 | 168 | August 17, 2013 | 0785162305; 978-0785162308 | Combined sales: 1,888 | EC |
| Fury MAX: My War Gone By ["I lick up war like it was sugar..."] | Hardcover (HC) | Fury MAX #1-13 | 312 | August 19, 2014 | 0785190384; 978-0785190387 | Combined sales: 1,304 | EC |

== See also ==
- 2013 in comics
- 2014 in comics
- Historical fiction
- War comics
