= Ballistic (comics) =

Ballistic, in comics, may refer to:

- Ballistic (Image Comics), a comic book character appearing in Marc Silvestri's series Cyberforce
- Ballistic (DC Comics), a DC Comics superhero

== See also ==
- Ballistic (disambiguation)
