= Fury: Peacemaker =

Marvel Comics miniseries by Garth Ennis

- Art by Mike Deodato

Publication information
- Publisher: Marvel Comics
- Format: Limited series
- Genre: War
- Publication date: 2006
- No. of issues: 6
- Main character: Nick Fury

Creative team
- Written by: Garth Ennis
- Penciller: Darick Robertson
- Inker(s): Jimmy Palmiotti; Rodney Ramos
- Letterer(s): Virtual Calligraphy; Joe Caramagna
- Editor: Axel Alonso

Fury: Peacemaker is a six issue miniseries written by Garth Ennis and drawn by Darick Robertson. It was published under the Marvel Knights imprint and takes place within the same continuity as Ennis' other Marvel Max series. The story functions as an origin story for Nick Fury and takes place before he joined the Howling Commandos.

The series is more conservative about its violence compared to Ennis' other two Fury series.

== Publication history ==
The series was originally published in the US in 2006. It was also reprinted in France in 2012.

== Plot ==
After seeing his troops butchered at Sidi Bou Zid in the lead-up to the battle of Kasserine Pass, Fury has a run-in with Stephen Barkhorn, a German lieutenant-general, who, seeing the broken Fury, advises him that the only way to be good at war is to "learn to enjoy it". Fury soon falls in with a group of irregular SAS soldiers, led by a Captain Kynaston, fighting in the deserts behind German lines. Contrasting the meat grinder at Sidi Bou Zid with the efficiency of Captain Kynaston's unit, Fury learns to truly enjoy war by fighting intelligently.

== Reception ==
The series has been described as far more realistic than other Marvel war comics, and has been praised for portraying Nick Fury in a very flawed light, as a rather ruthless soldier who strives to do the right thing.

Arya Ponto of Artboiled.com stated that the series lacks the excesses that turned people off from Ennis' first Fury series, and that Peacemaker is a swift, excellent WWII caper reminiscent of movies like Where Eagles Dare and Inglourious Basterds that also serves as an updated origin story for Fury.

== Prints ==
=== Issues ===
No.	Title	Cover date	Comic Book Roundup rating	Estimated sales (first month)	Rated
#1	"1: Kasserine Pass"	April 2006	—N/a	27,412, ranked 74th in North America	T+
#2	"2: The War Without The Army"	May 2006	—N/a	21,609, ranked 114th in North America	
#3	"3: Weapon of Choice"	June 2006	—N/a	19,177, ranked 110th in North America	
#4	"4: Final Solution"	July 2006	—N/a	18,372, ranked 123rd in North America	
#5	"5: Beasts"	August 2006	—N/a	16,982, ranked 114th in North America	
#6	"6: The End of the Beginning"	September 2006	—N/a	16,579, ranked 121st in North America	

=== Collected editions ===
Title	Format	Material collected	Pages	Publication date	ISBN	Estimated sales (North America) [Trades]	Rated
Fury: Peacemaker	Trade Paperback	Fury: Peacemaker #1-6	144	November 15, 2006	0-7851-1769-5	Combined sales: 2,377	T+

== Sequel ==
The series takes place before Ennis's first Fury series published in 2001 and was later followed by Fury: My War Gone By in 2013.

== See also ==
- 2006 in comics
- War comics
