= List of adaptations of works by Stephen King =

Stephen King is an American author widely known for his works of contemporary horror, thriller, science fiction, and fantasy. In addition to many novels, King has written approximately 200 short stories. His works have been widely adapted to film, television, and other media.

== Films ==
=== Adaptations with Stephen King's involvement ===
Year	Title	Writer	Actor	Role	Notes	Rotten Tomatoes
1982	Creepshow	Yes	Yes	Jordy Verrill	Based on the short stories "Weeds" and "The Crate"; the rest is original work for the film.	65%
1985	Cat's Eye	Yes	No	—N/a	Based on the short stories "Quitters, Inc." and "The Ledge"; the rest is original work for the film.	68%
1985	Silver Bullet	Yes	No	—N/a	Based on the novella "Cycle of the Werewolf"	43%
1986	Maximum Overdrive	Yes	Uncredited	Man at Bank ATM	Based on the short story "Trucks"; Also director	14%
1987	Creepshow 2	Stories	Yes	The Truck Driver	Based on the short story "The Raft"; the rest is original work for the film.	29%
1989	Pet Sematary	Yes	Yes	The Minister	Based on the novel of the same name	56%
1996	Thinner	No	Yes	The Pharmacist	Based on the novel of the same name (published under the pseudonym Richard Bachman)	19%
2014	A Good Marriage	Yes	No	—N/a	Based on the novella of the same name	32%
2016	Cell	Yes	No	—N/a	Based on the novel of the same name	11%
2019	It Chapter Two	No	Yes	The Shopkeeper	Based on the adult portions of the novel "It"	62%

=== Other film adaptations ===
Year	Title	Director	Notes	Rotten Tomatoes
1976	Carrie	Brian De Palma	Based on the novel of the same name	94%
1980	The Shining	Stanley Kubrick	Based on the novel of the same name	83%
1983	Disciples of the Crow	John Woodward	Based on the short story "Children of the Corn"	—N/a
1983	Cujo	Lewis Teague	Based on the novel of the same name	60%
1983	The Dead Zone	David Cronenberg	Based on the novel of the same name	89%
1983	Christine	John Carpenter	Based on the novel of the same name	74%
1984	Children of the Corn	Fritz Kiersch	Based on the short story of the same name	36%
1984	Firestarter	Mark L. Lester	Based on the novel of the same name	40%
1986	Stand by Me	Rob Reiner	Based on the novella "The Body"	92%
1987	The Running Man	Paul Michael Glaser	Based on the novel of the same name (published under the pseudonym Richard Bachman)	67%
1990	Tales from the Darkside: The Movie	John Harrison	Based on the short story "The Cat from Hell"; the rest is original work for the film.	46%
1990	Graveyard Shift	Ralph S. Singleton	Based on the short story of the same name	0%
1990	Misery	Rob Reiner	Based on the novel of the same name	91%
1993	The Dark Half	George A. Romero	Based on the novel of the same name	59%
1993	Needful Things	Fraser Clarke Heston	Based on the novel of the same name	33%
1994	The Shawshank Redemption	Frank Darabont	Based on the novella "Rita Hayworth and Shawshank Redemption"	89%
1995	The Mangler	Tobe Hooper	Based on the short story of the same name	27%
1995	Dolores Claiborne	Taylor Hackford	Based on the novel of the same name	86%
1997	The Night Flier	Mark Pavia	Based on the short story of the same name	33%
1998	Apt Pupil	Bryan Singer	Based on the novella of the same name	54%
1999	The Green Mile	Frank Darabont	Based on the novel of the same name	79%
2001	Hearts in Atlantis	Scott Hicks	Based on the novella "Low Men in Yellow Coats"	49%
2003	Dreamcatcher	Lawrence Kasdan	Based on the novel of the same name	28%
2003	Julie Ganapathi	Balu Mahendra	Based on the novel "Misery"	—N/a
2004	Secret Window	David Koepp	Based on the novella "Secret Window, Secret Garden"	46%
2004	Riding the Bullet	Mick Garris	Based on the novella of the same name	23%
2007	1408	Mikael Håfström	Based on the short story of the same name	79%
2007	No Smoking	Anurag Kashyap	Based on the short story "Quitters, Inc."	46%
2007	The Mist	Frank Darabont	Based on the novella of the same name	73%
2009	Dolan's Cadillac	Jeff Beesley	Based on the novella of the same name	—N/a
2013	Carrie	Kimberly Peirce	Based on the novel of the same name	51%
2014	Mercy	Peter Cornwell	Based on the short story "Gramma"	—N/a
2017	The Dark Tower	Nikolaj Arcel	Based on the series of the same name	16%
2017	It	Andy Muschietti	Based on the child portions of the novel "It"	85%
2017	Gerald's Game	Mike Flanagan	Based on the novel of the same name	91%
2017	1922	Zak Hilditch	Based on the novella of the same name	92%
2019	Pet Sematary	Kevin Kölsch; Dennis Widmyer	Based on the novel of the same name	57%
2019	In the Tall Grass	Vincenzo Natali	Based on the novella of the same name, co-authored with his son, Joe Hill	36%
2019	Doctor Sleep	Mike Flanagan	Based on the novel of the same name	78%
2020	Children of the Corn	Kurt Wimmer	Based on the short story of the same name	11%
2022	Firestarter	Keith Thomas	Based on the novel of the same name	10%
2022	Mr. Harrigan's Phone	John Lee Hancock	Based on the novella of the same name	46%
2023	The Boogeyman	Rob Savage	Based on the short story of the same name	60%
2024	The Life of Chuck	Mike Flanagan	Based on the novella of the same name	81%
2024	'Salem's Lot	Gary Dauberman	Based on the novel of the same name	45%
2025	The Monkey	Osgood Perkins	Based on the short story of the same name	77%
2025	The Long Walk	Francis Lawrence	Based on the novel of the same name	88%
2025	The Running Man	Edgar Wright	Based on the novel of the same name	64%
In development
TBA	Billy Summers	TBA	Based on the novel of the same name	TBA
TBA	Mister Yummy	TBA	Based on the short story of the same name	TBA
TBA	The Mist	Mike Flanagan	Based on the novella of the same name	TBA

== Television ==
=== Adaptations with Stephen King's involvement ===
Year	Title	Writer	Actor	Role	Notes	Rotten Tomatoes
1994	The Stand	Yes	Yes	Teddy Weizak	Based on the novel of the same name	70%
1995	The Langoliers	No	Yes	Tom Holby	Based on the novella in Four Past Midnight	48%
1997	The Shining	Yes	Yes	Gage Creed	Based on the novel of the same name Also third unit director	—N/a
2006	Desperation	Yes	No		Based on the novel of the same name	—N/a
2014	"Heads Will Roll"	Yes	Yes	The Diner Patron	An episode of the television series Under the Dome. Based on the novel of the same name.	—N/a
2017	"People in the Rain"	No	Yes	The Diner Patron	An episode of the television series Mr. Mercedes. Based on the novel of the same name.	—N/a
2020	"The House of the Dead"	No	Yes	Man on Hemingford Home poster	Episode of the 2020 miniseries The Stand. Based on the novel of the same name.	—N/a
2020	"The Circle Closes"	Yes	No		Episode of the 2020 miniseries The Stand. Based on the novel of the same name.	—N/a
2021	Lisey's Story	Yes	No		Based on the novel of the same name	53%

=== Other TV adaptations ===
Year	Title	Notes	Distributor	Network	Rotten Tomatoes
1979	Salem's Lot	Based on the novel of the same name	Warner Bros. Television	CBS	89%
1984	"The Word Processor of the Gods"	An episode of the anthology series Tales from the Darkside. Based on the short story of the same name.	CBS Television Distribution	Syndication	—N/a
1986	"Gramma"	An episode of the anthology series The Twilight Zone. Based on the short story of the same name.	CBS Television Distribution	CBS	—N/a
1990	It	Based on the novel of the same name	Warner Bros. Television	ABC	67%
1991	"The Moving Finger"	An episode of the anthology series Monsters. Based on the short story of the same name.	Tribune Entertainment	Syndication	—N/a
1991	Sometimes They Come Back	Based on the short story of the same name	CBS Television Distribution	CBS	67%
1993	The Tommyknockers	Based on the novel of the same name	Trimark Pictures	ABC	35%
1997	Trucks	Based on the short story of the same name	Trimark Pictures	USA Network	—N/a
1997	Quicksilver Highway	Based on the short story Chattery Teeth	20th Television	Fox Network	—N/a
1997	"The Revelations of 'Becka Paulson"	An episode of the anthology series The Outer Limits. Based on the short story of the same name.	MGM Television	Showtime	—N/a
1998	Woh	Based on the novel It	Zee Entertainment Enterprises	Zee TV	—N/a
2002	Carrie	Based on the novel of the same name	Metro-Goldwyn-Mayer	NBC	20%
2002–2007	The Dead Zone	Based on the novel of the same name	20th Television	USA Network	—N/a
2004	Salem's Lot	Based on the novel of the same name	Warner Bros. Television	TNT	69%
2006	Nightmares & Dreamscapes	Based on short stories in collections Nightmares & Dreamscapes, Everything's Eventual, and Night Shift	TNT		85%
2009	Children of the Corn	Based on the short story of the same name	Anchor Bay Entertainment	Syfy	0%
2010–2015	Haven	Based on the novel The Colorado Kid	Entertainment One	Syfy	63%
2011	Bag of Bones	Based on the novel of the same name	A&E Networks	A&E	—N/a
2013–2015	Under the Dome	Based on the novel of the same name	CBS Television Distribution	CBS	68%
2014	Big Driver	Based on the novella of the same name	Lifetime Movies	Lifetime	50%
2016	11.22.63	Based on the novel of the same name	Warner Bros. Television	Hulu	83%
2017	The Mist	Based on the novella of the same name	Dimension Television	Spike	60%
2017–2019	Mr. Mercedes	Based on the novels Mr. Mercedes, Finders Keepers and End of Watch	WarnerMedia Entertainment	Audience	91%
2018	"Chapter Thirty-One: A Night to Remember"	An episode of the television series Riverdale. Based on the characters by Archie Comics and the novel Carrie. Adapted from the latter's musical of the same name	Warner Bros. Television	The CW	100%
2019, 2020	Creepshow	Based on the short stories "Gray Matter" and "Survivor Type"; the rest is not based on stories by King.	Shudder		97%
2020	The Outsider	Based on the novel of the same name	Media Rights Capital	HBO	91%
2020–2021	The Stand	Based on the novel of the same name	CBS Television Distribution	CBS All Access	57%
2021	Chapelwaite	Based on the short story "Jerusalem's Lot"	Epix		60%
Ongoing
2025–present	The Institute	Based on the novel of the same name	MGM+		71%
2026–present	Carrie	Based on the novel of the same name	Amazon MGM Studios	Amazon Prime Video	85%
In development
TBA	Fairy Tale	Based on the novel of the same name	A24	TBA	TBA

== Derivative works ==
=== In films ===
Year	Title	Director	Notes	Distributor	Rotten Tomatoes
1987	A Return to Salem's Lot	Larry Cohen	Sequel to the Salem's Lot miniseries	Warner Bros.	—N/a
1992	Pet Sematary Two	Mary Lambert	Sequel to 1989's Pet Semetary	Paramount Pictures	21%
1992	Children of the Corn II: The Final Sacrifice	David Price	Sequel to 1984's Children of the Corn	Dimension Films	30%
1995	Children of the Corn III: Urban Harvest	James D. R. Hickox	Sequel to 1984's Children of the Corn	Dimension Films	—N/a
1996	Sometimes They Come Back... Again	Adam Grossman	Based on 1991's Sometimes They Come Back	Trimark Pictures	—N/a
1996	Children of the Corn IV: The Gathering	Greg Spence	Sequel to 1984's Children of the Corn	Dimension Films	—N/a
1998	Children of the Corn V: Fields of Terror	Ethan Wiley	Sequel to 1984's Children of the Corn	Dimension Films	14%
1998	Sometimes They Come Back... for More	Daniel Zelik Berk	Based on 1991's Sometimes They Come Back	Trimark Pictures	0%
1999	The Rage: Carrie 2	Katt Shea	Sequel to 1976's Carrie	United Artists	23%
1999	Children of the Corn 666: Isaac's Return	Kari Skogland	Sequel to 1984's Children of the Corn	Dimension Films	0%
2001	Children of the Corn: Revelation	Guy Magar	Sequel to 1984's Children of the Corn	Dimension Films	0%
2002	The Mangler 2	Michael Hamilton-Wright	Sequel to 1995's The Mangler	Artisan Entertainment	—N/a
2003	The Diary of Ellen Rimbauer	Craig R. Baxley	Prequel to 2002's Rose Red, written by King for television	ABC Studios, Lionsgate	17%
2005	The Mangler Reborn	Erik Gardner and Matt Cunningham	Sequel to 1995's The Mangler	Lionsgate	—N/a
2006	Creepshow 3	Ana Clavell and James Dudelson	Sequel to 1982's Creepshow and 1987's Creepshow 2	Taurus Entertainment Company	0%
2011	Children of the Corn: Genesis	Joel Soisson	A reboot to the Children of the Corn film series	Dimension Extreme	—N/a
2018	Children of the Corn: Runaway	John Gulager	A sequel to 2011's Children of the Corn: Genesis	Lionsgate Films	—N/a
2023	Pet Sematary: Bloodlines	Lindsey Anderson Beer	Origin story based on Pet Sematary	Paramount+	23%

=== In television ===
Year	Title	Notes	Distributor	Network	Rotten Tomatoes
2002	Firestarter: Rekindled	Sequel to 1984's Firestarter	Sci-Fi Channel		—N/a
2018–19	Castle Rock	Based on the eponymous fictional city and also characters created by King	Warner Bros. Television	Hulu	88%
2019–23	Creepshow	Following the same anthology formula as the Creepshow films	Shudder		85%
Ongoing
2025–present	It: Welcome to Derry	Prequel television series based on It	Warner Bros. Television	HBO	84%
In development

=== In print ===
Year	Title	Author	Notes	Publisher
2001	The Diary of Ellen Rimbauer: My Life at Rose Red	Ridley Pearson	Prequel tie-in novel to King's 2002 television series Rose Red	Hyperion
2019	Gwendy's Magic Feather	Richard Chizmar	Sequel to the novella co-written with King Gwendy's Button Box	Cemetery Dance

== Comics ==
Year	Title	Notes	Publisher
1981	The Lawnmower Man in Bizarre Adventures #29	Based on the short story "The Lawnmower Man"	Marvel Comics
1982	Creepshow	Based on the Creepshow film	Plume
2009	The Talisman	Based on the novel The Talisman	Del Rey
2010	N.	Based on the novella N.	Marvel Comics
2012	Road Rage	Based on the novella Throttle, co-authored with his son, Joe Hill	IDW Publishing
2012	The Little Green God of Agony	Based on the short story of the same name	Free comic on King's official website
2020	Sleeping Beauties	Based on the novel Sleeping Beauties, co-authored with his son, Owen King	IDW Publishing
The Dark Tower
2007	The Dark Tower: The Gunslinger Born	Spin-offs from the Dark Tower novels	Marvel Comics
2008	The Dark Tower: The Long Road Home	Spin-offs from the Dark Tower novels	Marvel Comics
2008	The Dark Tower: Treachery	Spin-offs from the Dark Tower novels	Marvel Comics
2009	The Dark Tower: The Sorcerer	Spin-offs from the Dark Tower novels	Marvel Comics
2009	The Dark Tower: The Fall of Gilead	Spin-offs from the Dark Tower novels	Marvel Comics
2009	The Dark Tower: Battle of Jericho Hill	Spin-offs from the Dark Tower novels	Marvel Comics
2010	The Dark Tower: The Gunslinger – The Journey Begins	Based on the novel The Dark Tower: The Gunslinger	Marvel Comics
2010	The Dark Tower: The Gunslinger – The Little Sisters of Eluria	Based on the short story The Little Sisters of Eluria	Marvel Comics
2011	The Dark Tower: The Gunslinger – The Battle of Tull	Based on the novel The Dark Tower: The Gunslinger	Marvel Comics
2011	The Dark Tower: The Gunslinger – The Way Station	Based on the novel The Dark Tower: The Gunslinger	Marvel Comics
2012	The Dark Tower: The Gunslinger – The Man in Black	Based on the novel The Dark Tower: The Gunslinger	Marvel Comics
2013	The Dark Tower: The Gunslinger – Sheemie's Tale	Spin-offs from the Dark Tower novels	Marvel Comics
2013	The Dark Tower: The Gunslinger – Evil Ground	Spin-offs from the Dark Tower novels	Marvel Comics
2013	The Dark Tower: The Gunslinger – So Fell Lord Perth	Spin-offs from the Dark Tower novels	Marvel Comics
2014	The Dark Tower: The Drawing of the Three – The Prisoner	Based on the novel The Dark Tower II: The Drawing of the Three	Marvel Comics
2015	The Dark Tower: The Drawing of the Three – House of Cards	Based on the novel The Dark Tower II: The Drawing of the Three	Marvel Comics
2016	The Dark Tower: The Drawing of the Three – Lady of Shadows	Based on the novel The Dark Tower II: The Drawing of the Three	Marvel Comics
2016	The Dark Tower: The Drawing of the Three - Bitter Medicine	Based on the novel The Dark Tower II: The Drawing of the Three	Marvel Comics
2017	The Dark Tower: The Drawing of the Three – The Sailor	Based on the novel The Dark Tower III: The Waste Lands	Marvel Comics
The Stand
2008	The Stand: Captain Trips	Based on the novel The Stand	Marvel Comics
2009	The Stand: American Nightmares	Based on the novel The Stand	Marvel Comics
2009	The Stand: Soul Survivors	Based on the novel The Stand	Marvel Comics
2010	The Stand: Hardcases	Based on the novel The Stand	Marvel Comics
2011	The Stand: No Mans Land	Based on the novel The Stand	Marvel Comics
2011	The Stand: Night Has Come	Based on the novel The Stand	Marvel Comics

== Video games ==
Year	Title	Platform(s)	Notes	Developer/publisher
1985	The Mist	PC	Based on the novella of the same name	Mindscape
1989	The Running Man	Amiga; Amstrad CPC; Atari ST; Commodore 64; ZX Spectrum	Based on the film adaptation of the 1982 novel	Emerald Software; Grandslam Interactive
1992	The Dark Half	MS-DOS	Based on the novel of the same name	Capstone Software
1999	Stephen King's F13	Microsoft Windows; Macintosh	The game includes a digital copy of the novella Everything's Eventual	Presto Studios; Blue Byte

== Stage ==
- 1988: Carrie was initially a flop on Broadway, but has since gained a cult following. The musical was revived at the Lucille Lortel Theatre in New York, directed by Stafford Arima from January to April 2012. On September 25, 2012, the first official cast recording was released.
- 1990: Ghost Stories was an adaptation of Stephen King's short stories "The Return of Timmy Baterman," about zombies; "Strawberry Spring," about a campus serial killer; "Gray Matter," a black comedy about a hideous mutation caused by a bottle of beer; "Uncle Otto's Truck," and "The Boogeyman," about a distraught father's encounter with a child-killing closet monster, as well as selections from Pet Sematary. Adapted and directed by Robert Pridham, the play premiered at the Arts Center Theatre at Kent Place School in Summit, New Jersey, and toured the United States in the mid-1990s.
- 1992: Misery stage play by Simon Moore based on 1987 novel. Another adaptation, written by William Goldman (who wrote the 1990 film), premiered on Broadway in 2015 with Bruce Willis and Laurie Metcalf. This version was also adapted to Polish language. It premiered at the Kwadrat Theatre in Warsaw in 2017. A musical version also exists, written by Jeff Hockhauser and Bob Johnson. While it has not been staged, a demo recording has circulated on the internet in recent years. There are also four Finnish-language stage adaptations of Misery under the name Piina: the first adaptation was performed in October 2019 by Tampere Theatre in Tampere, the second adaptation was performed in September of the same year by Kuopio City Theatre in Kuopio, the third adaptation was performed in November 2022 by Pori Theatre in Pori, and the fourth adaptation was performed in February 2025 by Seinäjoki City Theatre in Seinäjoki.
- 1993: Rage stage play written by Phillip Smith, produced by Shane Black, and directed by Jim Birge. It was intended to premiere in Jasper, Indiana, but scheduling and venue issues due to protests over its mature themes forced it to move to the American Legion hall in Santa Claus, Indiana, where it ran from April 23 to May 1.
- 2009: Rita Hayworth and Shawshank Redemption was dramatized by Dave Johns and Owen O'Neill for the Gaiety Theatre, Dublin. A later version, directed by Peter Sheridan, had its world premiere at the Peter Sheridan Theatre in London in September 2010. A production was mounted at the Edinburgh Festival Fringe directed by Lucy Pitman-Wallace in August 2013. In April 2019, The Shawshank Redemption made its North American debut at the Metropolitan Ensemble Theatre in Kansas City, Missouri, directed by Bob Paisley. It garnered great reviews from critics during its run. It featured Keenan Ramos as Red, Chris Roady as Andy Defresne, S.E. Perry as Warden Stammas, Tim Ahlenius as Hadley, Chad Burris as Boggs Diamond, Dan Daly as Pinky, Kevin Fewell as Brooksie, Christopher Preyer as Rooster, Larry Goodman as Dawkins, Nick Hazel as Entwhistle, Evan Lovelace as Tommy, Andrew Paredes as Rico, and Alex Paxton as inmate/guard.
- 2012: Ghost Brothers of Darkland County, an original musical with book by Stephen King and music and lyrics by John Mellencamp. After a week of previews, it ran at Atlanta's Alliance Theatre from April 11 to May 13, 2012. A concept album was released the following year.
- 2013: Dolores Claiborne is an American opera composed by Tobias Picker. It premiered at the San Francisco Opera in Fall 2013. Before that, the novel was also made into a couple of Finnish plays, both called Doloreksen tunnustus: in 2009 presented by Tukkateatteri, and in 2012 presented by Ad Astra Teatteri.
- 2014: The Body (also known as "Stand By Me") was produced by Chellaston Players in Derby, England. Though an amateur staging (produced with Stephen King's permission), it received rave reviews.

There have also been dramatizations of many of King's short stories, including "Nona", "Quitters, Inc.", "In the Deathroom", "Strawberry Spring", "Harvey's Dream", "The Man Who Loved Flowers", "Mute", "The Ten O'Clock People" and King's poem, "Paranoid: A Chant". There have also been alleged stage productions of Rage as well as several parody stage versions of The Shining.

== Music ==
- 1983: "The Stand", recorded and released by Welsh rock band The Alarm, was recorded and released in the United Kingdom as a single. The song's lyrics were inspired by King's novel of the same name
- 1985: "Lone Justice", recorded and released by American heavy metal band Anthrax, was based on the King novella The Gunslinger.
- 1984: "Horror-Teria: (The Beginning)" from the Twisted Sister album Stay Hungry. The album's liner notes thank King for inspiring the piece.
- 1987: "Among the Living", recorded and released by American heavy metal band Anthrax, was based on the King novel The Stand. "The Walkin' Dude" is Randall Flagg, the main villain in the novel, and the beginning verse: "Disease! Disease! Spreading the disease! / With some help from Captain Trips / He'll bring the world down to its knees" refers to the virus that destroys most of the population in the novel.
- 1987: "A Skeleton in the Closet", recorded and released by American heavy metal band Anthrax, was based on the King novella Apt Pupil from the collection Different Seasons.
- 1987: "Severed Survival", recorded and released by American death metal band Autopsy, was based on the King short story Survivor Type.
- 1988: "Misery Loves Company", recorded and released by American heavy metal band Anthrax, was based on the King novel Misery.
- 1988: Formation of the American punk rock band Pennywise, who took the name from the evil clown monster of the same name from King's highly successful epic horror novel It.
- 1989: "Pet Sematary", recorded and released by American punk rock band The Ramones, was a single from their eleventh studio album, Brain Drain. The song was originally written for the King movie adaptation of the novel of the same name. The single became one of the band's biggest radio hits and a staple in their concerts during the 1990s.
- 2000: The music video for the song "Spit it Out", recorded and released by American heavy metal band Slipknot, pays homage to Stanley Kubrick's 1980 film adaptation of the King novel The Shining.
- 2002: Formation of the Dutch symphonic metal band Delain, who took the name from the Kingdom of Delain from the King novel The Eyes of the Dragon.
- 2006: The music video for the song The Kill, recorded and released by American rock band Thirty Seconds to Mars, was inspired by Stanley Kubrick's 1980 film adaptation of the King novel The Shining.
- 2006: The song "Carry the Blessed Home", recorded and released by German power metal band Blind Guardian on their eighth studio album, A Twist in the Myth. It is about Roland Deschain and Jake Chambers at the end of the Dark Tower series.
- 2007: "Dull Boy", recorded and released by American heavy metal band Mudvayne, was a single for both the band's fourth studio album, The New Game, and the band's compilation album By the People, for the People. The song was based on both the King novel and the Stanley Kubrick movie of The Shining.
- 2010: King provided the voice of Will 'o the Wisp for Shooter Jennings's "Black Ribbons" music video.
- 2014: The music video for the song "Animals", recorded and released by American pop rock band Maroon 5, was inspired by a blood scene from both Brian De Palma's 1976 and Stanley Kubrick's 1980 film adaptations of the King novels Carrie and The Shining. Three years later, the band did again with another music video of their song "Cold", this time in Kubriek's The Shining, in a scene with the woman in a chicken costume with the man (a reference to the film with a person in a bear costume with the man).
- 2015: American heavy metal and metallic hardcore band Ice Nine Kills recorded and released the song "Hell in the Hallways" (which was based on King's first horror novel Carrie) on their fourth studio album, Every Trick in the Book. A number of months later, the band created, recorded and released the single "Enjoy Your Slay" (based on Stanley Kubrick's 1980 film adaptation of the King novel The Shining) from their fifth studio album, The Silver Scream.
- 2016: The song "Breathing Lightning", recorded and released by American heavy metal band Anthrax, was based on the Dark Tower series.
- 2019: American heavy metal and metallic hardcore band Ice Nine Kills recorded and released their fifth studio album, The Silver Scream, featuring "It Is the End", based upon and inspired by the 2017 theatrical film adaptation of King's horror novel It. And later "Funeral Derangements", based on Pet Semetary, as the 4th single from their follow up album The Silver Scream 2: Welcome to Horrorwood.

== See also ==
- Dollar Babies, short film adaptations of King material made by students and aspiring filmmakers
