= Dollar Baby =

$1 short story contract with Stephen King

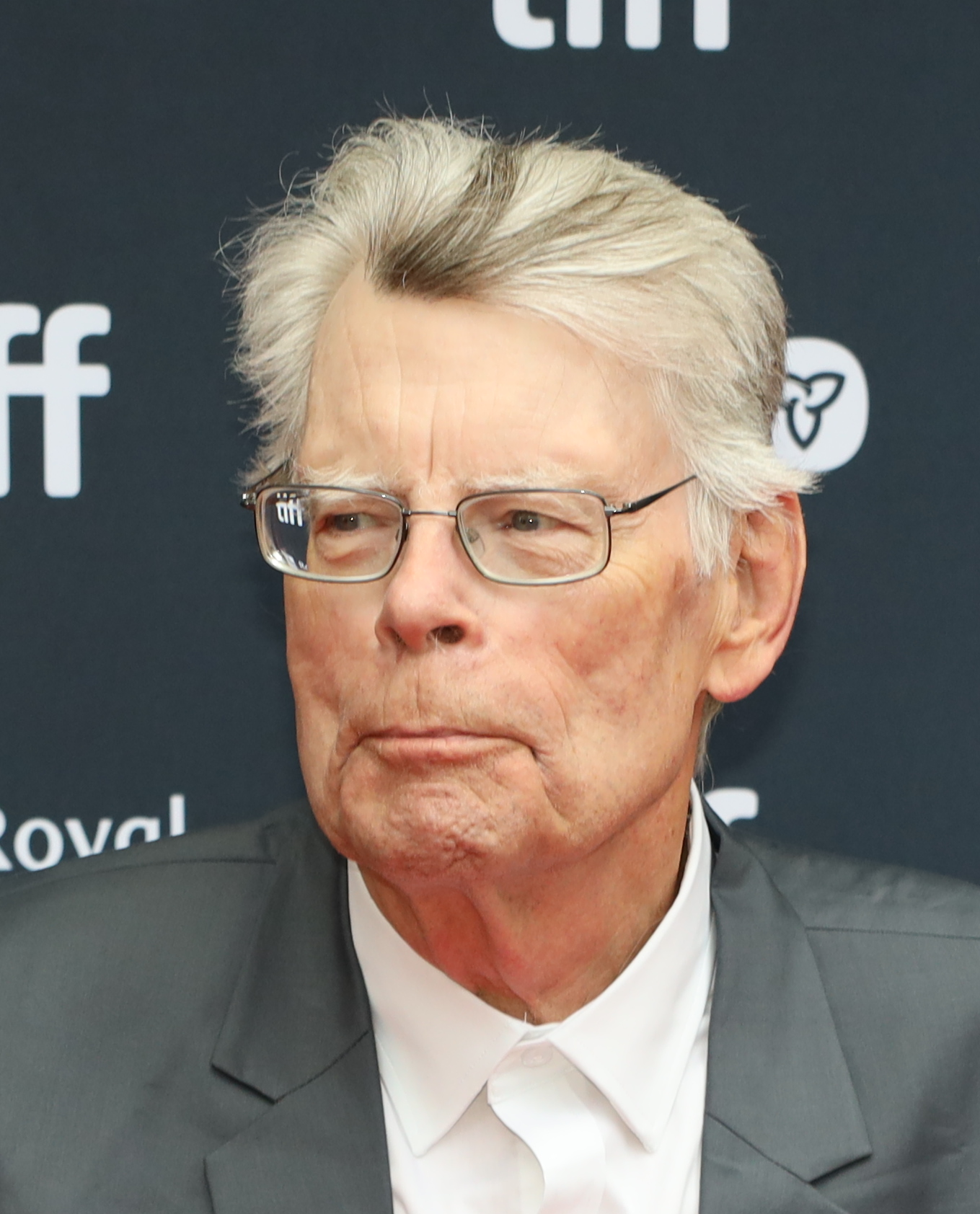
Stephen King in 2024.

The Dollar Baby (or Dollar Deal) was an arrangement in which American author Stephen King would grant permission to students and aspiring filmmakers or theater producers to adapt one of his short stories for $1. King retains the rights to his work, but as he began to experience commercial success, he decided to use the Dollar Baby to help the next generation of creatives. The term may be used to refer to both the adaptation itself and the person adapting it; for example, "The Sun Dog" was made as a Dollar Baby and filmmaker Matt Flesher became a Dollar Baby upon adapting it.

The production budgets have ranged from a few hundred dollars to over $60,000 for projects such as Umney's Last Case, and the film formats range from home video to professional 35 mm film.

According to the official Stephen King website, the Dollar Baby program ended in December 2023.

== History ==
As King explained in his introduction to the published shooting script for Frank Darabont's The Shawshank Redemption (based on his Different Seasons novella Rita Hayworth and Shawshank Redemption), "Around 1977 or so, when I started having some popular success, I saw a way to give back a little of the joy the movies had given me."

'77 was the year young film makers – college students, for the most part – started writing me about the stories I'd published (first in Night Shift, later in Skeleton Crew), wanting to make short films out of them. Over the objections of my accountant, who saw all sorts of possible legal problems, I established a policy which still holds today. I will grant any student filmmaker the right to make a movie out of any short story I have written (not the novels, that would be ridiculous), so long as the film rights are still mine to assign. I ask them to sign a paper promising that no resulting film will be exhibited commercially without approval, and that they send me a videotape of the finished work. For this one-time right I ask a dollar. I have made the dollar-deal, as I call it, over my accountant's moans and head-clutching protests sixteen or seventeen times as of this writing [1996].

Once the film was made and King received his copy, he explains, "I'd look at the films... then put them up on a shelf I had marked 'Dollar Babies'."

Frank Darabont was 20 years old when he made his Dollar Baby adaptation of "The Woman in the Room". It was eventually released in 1986 on VHS by Granite Entertainment Group Interglobal Home Video as part of the Stephen King's Night Shift Collection, along with New York University film student Jeff Schiro's adaptation of "The Boogeyman", and John Woodward's "Disciples of the Crow". Darabont later wrote adaptations and directed three feature films based on Stephen King's novels: The Mist, The Shawshank Redemption, and The Green Mile. The latter two films were nominated for multiple Academy Awards including Best Picture.

Author Stephen J. Spignesi was one of the first to publicly discuss the Dollar Babies in his exhaustive volume The Stephen King Encyclopedia. He wrote about two student film adaptations of King stories: "The Last Rung on the Ladder" (1987) by James Cole and Dan Thron, and "The Lawnmower Man" (1987) by Jim Gonis.

== 1977–1996 ==
As Dollar Babies were not intended to be seen by the public, beyond screening at film festivals and school presentations, and were not commercially sold or openly traded prior to the advent of the Internet, many of them were not known to the Stephen King fan community. In 1996, when King first publicly discussed the Dollar Deal policy, he mentioned "sixteen or seventeen" such Dollar Babies. It has been difficult to account for them. Although Frank Darabont originally asked in 1980 to adapt King's "The Woman in the Room", he took three years to complete the film.

Known Dollar Baby films made between 1977 and 1996:
Year	Title	Director(s)	Notes
1982	The Boogeyman	Jeffrey C. Shiro	Given commercial distribution rights
1983	Disciples of the Crow	John Woodward	Based on "Children of the Corn"
1983	The Woman in the Room	Frank Darabont	Given commercial distribution rights
1986	Srazhenie (The Battle)	Mikhail Titov	Animation based on "Battleground"
1987	The Last Rung on the Ladder	James Cole; Dan Thron	
1987	The Lawnmower Man	Jim Gonis	
1989	Cain Rose Up	David C. Spillers	Based on "Cain Rose Up"
1993	The Sun Dog	Matt Flesher	
1996	The Man Who Loved Flowers	Andrew Newman	

== 2000–2025 ==
In 2000, Los Angeles-based filmmaker Jay Holben made a Dollar Deal to adapt "Paranoid: A Chant," a 100-line poem that appears in King's Skeleton Crew. In 2002 the Paranoid short film was the first Dollar Baby to be released - with King's permission - for a limited time on the Internet. Again with King's permission, this film was the first Dollar Baby to be released on a commercial DVD, in a package with Total Movie Magazine, a short-lived offshoot of the U.K. publication Total Film.

Influenced by the success of "Paranoid," in 2002 filmmaker Peter Sullivan wrote and produced a dollar baby based on the short story Night Surf. A precursor to the novel The Stand, "Night Surf" tells the story of a smaller group of teens who seek sanctuary at a beach house while the Captain Trips strain of the flu devastates the population. This short film would later become a calling card for Sullivan, who went on to a career producing and directing over 100 films for television.

In September 2004, fellow Dollar Baby James Renner (who created "All That You Love Will Be Carried Away") organized the first public film festival screenings of Dollar Babies. The festival was held in the D. P. Corbett Business Theater at the University of Maine, Orono, Stephen King's alma mater (1966–1970). As a student, he had written for The Maine Campus newspaper. Renner organized a second Dollar Baby festival in September 2005 at the same location.

On the Internet, the largest public collection of the Dollar Babies has been put together by Bernd Lautenslager from the Netherlands. Many of the films listed above were available for download at a site called "Stephen King Short Movies". At the request of King's representatives, the films are no longer available for download. To date, the only short that King specifically granted permission to play for a limited time on the Internet was Paranoid.

In October 2009, director/producer J. P. Scott completed the first full-length Dollar Baby. His adaptation of "Everything's Eventual" tells the story of a young man with mysterious powers who is recruited by an equally enigmatic corporation. Shortly after receiving a copy of the movie, King viewed the film and was "very impressed" by it. Unusually, he granted J. P. Scott the rights to theatrically distribute the film. The only other Dollar Babies to have been approved for distribution rights were Frank Darabont's "The Woman in the Room" and Jeff Schiro's "The Boogeyman"; these were released as Stephen King's Nightshift Collection.

The first British Dollar Baby was the 2011 adaptation of "Mute", produced by Gemma Rigg and directed by Jacqueline Wright.

In 2012, Russian director Maria Ivanova finished "Beachworld" as a Dollar Baby project. The film was screened on several film festivals around the world. It is the first official Russian Dollar Baby.

In 2015, British director Matthew Rowney produced and directed "I Am the Doorway" as a Dollar Baby project. He won more than 41 international film awards and screened the short film at several US Comic Cons. Since then, several other filmmakers have chosen to adapt the same story.

In 2018, Selina Sondermann began production on "Dedication". This is the second Dollar Baby to be adapted in Germany. Also in 2018, Canadian filmmaker Jon Mann released "Popsy."

In 2019, the Blaenau Gwent Film Academy produced "Stationary Bike", which won various international awards.

In 2019, Walt Perez directed, produced and adapted "One for the Road". The short film was titled "Into the Night". After two successful screenings at the Dryden Theatre and Warner Bros. Studios, Burbank, the film entered the film festival circuit in 2020. The film received acclaim and award nominations at various festivals. In 2021, "Into the Night" was qualified for consideration in the 93rd Academy Awards, under the Best Live Action Short Film Category.

In 2021, Stephen King Dollar Baby: The Book by Anthony Northrup was released.

In 2021, Barker Street Cinema hosted the Stephen King Rules Dollar Baby Film Festival during the COVID-19 pandemic. It virtually screened 25 films created under the Dollar Deal.

In 2022, Verloren Productions and director Ayem Walters returned to the world of Stephen King with "The Stationary Bike" (2022). An adaptation of King's short story of the same name. The film premiered at Raleigh Studios in the fall of 2022. Stationary Bike went on to be nominated and win accolades in the film festival season of 2022 and 2023.

In 2025, the Academy Museum of Motion Pictures curated a program of 6 short films to represent the program that span approximately 45 years: Jay Holben’s Paranoid, Disciples of the Crow, Dedication by Selina Sondermann, Jon Mann’s Popsy, Beachworld by Jackie Perez and If You Tell Your Dreams… by Yonatan Weinstein. The screening took place on November 19 at Ted Mann Theater.

Known Dollar Baby films made since 2000:
Year	Title	Director(s)	Notes
2002	Paranoid: A Chant	Jay Holben	The first Dollar Baby released on a commercial DVD
2002	Night Surf	Peter Sullivan	
2006	Umney's Last Case	Rodney Altman	
2009	In The Deathroom	Luke Cheney	First adaptation of the short story.
2009	Everything's Eventual	J. P. Scott	Given commercial distribution rights
2010	Here There Be Tigers	Joshua Meadow & Aaron Botwick	
2011	Mute	Jacqueline Wright	
2012	Beachworld	Maria Ivanova	First official Russian Dollar Baby.
2012	Survivor Type	Billy Hanson	
2012	The Boogeyman	Jenny Januszewski	
2013	The Boogeyman	Armando (Mando) Franco	
2013	Grey Matter	Red Clark	
2015	I Am The Doorway	Matthew Rowney	
2015	Beachworld	Chad Bolling	
2018	Dedication	Selina Sondermann	
2018	Popsy	Jon Mann	
2018	One For The Road	Joseph Horning	
2019	Stationary Bike	Alexander Haydn Jones	
2019	Into the Night	Walt Perez	Adaptation of One For The Road
2019	Here There Be Tygers	Polly Schattel	Night Frizz Productions, screenplay by Jennifer Trudrung
2019	Uncle Otto's Truck	Brian Johnson	
2019	Vinton's Lot	Jamie Dearden	Adaptation of A Very Tight Place
2019	A Tale of the Laundry Game	Alice Maio Mackay	Adaptation of "Big Wheels: A Tale of the Laundry Game (Milkman No. 2)"
2020	Beachworld	Jackie Perez	
2020	The Passenger	Alexander Bruckner	Adaptation of Rest Stop
2020	Rest Stop	Joshua Lozano	
2020	Mute	Rob Darren	
2020	Cain Rose Up/Garrish	A.J. Gribble	
2020	The Man Who Loved Flowers	Mark Hensley	
2020	All That You Love Will Be Carried Away	Michael Lamberti	
2020	Morning Deliveries	Robbie Smith	
2021	Graduation Afternoon	Rob Padilla Jr.	Adaptation of Graduation Afternoon
2021	That Feeling	Paul Inman	Adaptation of That Feeling, You Can Only Say What It Is In French
2022	Cain Rose Up	Miguel Alejandro Marquez	
2022	Stationary Bike	Ayem Walters	
2022	The Woman in the Room	J. Caleb Thomas	Based on the story "The Woman in the Room." Gender-switched the characters.
2023	One For The Road	William R.A. Rush	
2023	Tudo o que Você Ama Será Destruído	Joao Augusto De Nardo	
2023	I Know What You Need	Julia Marchese	
2023	Luckey Quarter	L.E. Peralta	First animated short film adaptation
2024	Norma	Samantha Hussey	Based on the story "The Man Who Loved Flowers"
2024	The Reach	Luca Caserta	Produced by Nuove Officine Cinematografiche
2024	The Reach	Matty Thomas Taylor	First animation ever made of this story.
2024	Willa	Carol Del Mar	
2024	The Dedication	Adrienne Camille Lunson	First Dollar Baby from Japan

== Copyright ==
It is a common misconception that the filmmakers of the Dollar Babies have optioned or obtained the legal rights to the original King stories. But, author King retains all rights and simply grants permission to the filmmaker to make a non-commercial adaptation. In the case of The Woman in the Room, The Boogeyman, and Disciples of the Crow, Granite Entertainment Group Interglobal Home Video negotiated and purchased the rights to commercially release the shorts on video in 1986. The cost of such agreements far surpass the original $1 for Dollar Baby permission.

These films were originally announced for home video distribution by Gerard Ravels's Native Son International, but after Frank Darabont discovered that Ravels did not secure proper rights to the stories, the release was scrapped. As part of the agreement with King, all Dollar Baby films must include the specific phrase "© Stephen King. Used by Permission. All Rights Reserved."

King's unorthodox arrangement of granting limited permission and retaining rights is the reason the films cannot be commercially released nor can the filmmakers garner any profit from the works. Because King retains the rights, he can allow multiple filmmakers to make adaptations from the same original story. For example, the story "All That You Love Will Be Carried Away" has been adapted seven times: by James Renner, Anthony Kaneaster, Scott Albanese, Chi Laughlin, Natalie Mooallem (as All That You Love), by Robert Sterling and Brian Berkowitz (as The Secret Transit Codes of America's Highways), and by Hendrik Harms and Chloe Brown under other titles.

King's phrase "so long as the film rights are still mine to assign..." has two meanings. King retains rights to the original material in order to sell them to a legitimate buyer in the future. He also retains rights to material that has not been previously sold (i.e., material to which King still holds all the rights). If another company or individual has purchased the film rights to one of King's stories, he no longer has legal authority to grant permission to a Dollar Baby, as the rights are now held by the buyer.

Because of the restrictions on Dollar Deals, filmmakers cannot upload their films (Dollar Babies) onto video-sharing websites such as YouTube or Vimeo.

=== Possessory title ===
Some Dollar Baby filmmakers have mistakenly believed that King's explicit permission to make and showcase the adapted filmwork automatically qualifies the film for a possessory credit (e.g. "Stephen King's Silver Bullet" as opposed to just "Silver Bullet"). But this is a specified legal usage of the author's name, and King does not grant permission for Dollar Baby filmmakers to use his name in this manner. King allows the possessory title to be used only on projects in which he has a direct and considerable involvement.

Previously, the possessory title was applied more liberally until it was abused by the release of Brett Leonard's The Lawnmower Man. Leonard originally released it as Stephen King's The Lawnmower Man, although the adaptation bears little to no resemblance to King's short story. In response, King filed a lawsuit against the filmmakers over this. After a federal court ruled in King's favor, a Second Circuit Court of Appeals upheld that and ruled that King's name should be removed from the film's title, which was done.

== Critical commentary ==
As King has said, "Many of these adaptations weren't so great, but a few showed at least a smattering of talent...in many cases one viewing was all a person could bear." As noted, many, if not the majority, of the Dollar Baby films are made by student or tyro filmmakers. King offered praise to "...a fairly impressive eighteen minute version of 'The Sun Dog'". Darabont's The Woman in the Room, in addition to being photographed by the cinematographer Juan Ruiz Anchia (Glengarry Glen Ross), made the semi-finalist list for Academy Award consideration in 1983. King is quoted as saying that "The Woman in the Room" is "clearly the best of the short films made from my stuff."

Paranoid is among the most critically acclaimed Dollar Babies. Rolling Stone magazine's David Wild said of the film, "Rarely has paranoia been so much fun...Jay Holben has created a stunning and artful rendering of madness, turning a poem by Stephen King into a vivid and compelling nightmare vision."

== End ==
In December 2023, Stephen King tweeted about the end saying, "Margaret, the Mistress of Dollar Babies, is retiring," referring to Margaret Morehouse, the person directly responsible for the program. Contracts executed prior to December 2023 remained in effect until 2024.

== Notes ==
27. - Stephen King Dollar Baby:The Book by Anthony W. Northrup released January 19th, 2021. Published by Bear Manor Media Publishing.

28. - Stephen King Dollar Baby:The Sequel by Anthony W. Northrup released October 31st, 2024. Published by Bear Manor Media Publishing.

29. - Stephen King Dollar Baby:Encore! by Anthony W. Northrup released January 15th, 2026. Published by Bear Manor Media Publishing. This is the official "Stephen King Dollar Baby Book Trilogy."
