= Suffer the Little Children =

1972 Stephen King short story

- Short story by Stephen King
- Country: United States
- Language: English
- Genre: Horror

Publication
- Published in: Cavalier; Nightmares & Dreamscapes
- Publication type: Magazine; Anthology
- Publisher: DuGent Publishing Corporation; Viking Press
- Media type: Print (Paperback)
- Publication date: February 1972; 1993

"Suffer the Little Children" is a horror short story by American writer Stephen King. It was first published by Cavalier in 1972, and was later collected in King's book Nightmares & Dreamscapes in 1993.

== Plot summary ==
Miss Emily Sidley is a third grade teacher. One day, while teaching spelling, Sidley gets the disconcerting feeling that one of her students is staring at her. She turns around and notices Robert, the quietest student, staring at her. Over the next week, Miss Sidley punishes Robert based on her suspicions. Robert taunts her by asking her if she wants to see him "change", which he then does, though whether it really happened or it was just a figment of Miss Sidley's imagination is left to interpretation. Either way, Miss Sidley is terrified and runs away screaming, nearly being hit by a bus.

After the incident, Miss Sidley takes a leave of absence. When she returns, Robert taunts her at recess about more creatures at school posing as normal children. They have replaced the real children they look like, who are imprisoned within their doppelgängers. He says of the real Robert: "I can hear him screaming, Miss Sidley. He wants me to let him out."

Robertis words soon reach Miss Sidley, and the terrified teacher decides to take drastic measures. She takes out her deceased brother's pistol from a drawer and puts it in her purse. That day at school, she takes Robert to a testing room where sound is well concealed, and shoots him dead, then goes back to collect and shoot eleven more of her students. Another teacher comes in as Sidley is preparing to shoot a thirteenth student, and Sidley's bad back gives way as the other teacher struggles with her.

Miss Sidley is sent to a mental institution after the murders. She works with mentally handicapped children each day for therapy. One day she feels the fear that drove her to her crime and asks to be removed from the room. As they take her away, some of the children slyly watch her, implying they are also doppelgängers. That night, Miss Sidley commits suicide by slashing her throat, and her former psychiatrist soon focuses intently on the children.

== Publication ==
"Suffer the Little Children" was first published in the magazine Cavalier in February 1972. It was originally planned to be published in King's first collection of short stories, Night Shift, in 1978, but editor Bill Thompson opted to cut it for length (King had wanted to cut "Gray Matter", but deferred to Thompson's choice). In 1979, "Suffer the Little Children" was included in the anthology Nightmares edited by Charles L. Grant. In 1983, it was included in the anthology The Evil Image: Two Centuries of Gothic Short Fiction and Poetry edited by Nora Crow Jaffe and Patricia L. Skarda. In 1993, the story was collected in King's book of short stories Nightmares & Dreamscapes.

== Reception ==
Christopher Golden describes "Suffer the Little Children" as an "effective chiller."

King has stated that the story reminds him of the works of Ray Bradbury, and similarities have been noted by other authors as well. King also wrote that the story had "no redeeming social merit whatever.

== Adaptations ==
Bernardo Villela made a Dollar Baby film adaptation. The audiobook version was narrated by actress Whoopi Goldberg.

In 2015 a short film directed by Corey Norman and written by Haley Norman was released, starring Anne Bobby, Andrew Lyndaker and Beth Somerville. The producers were Heeth Grantham, Corey Norman and Haley Norman.

A 2017 short film directed by Alexander Domogarov Jr. was released, titled Let the Children in ("Пустите детей"). The film was made for the YouTube platform in the Russian language with English subtitles.

A film adaptation is in the works from producers Craig Flores, Nicolas Chartier and Sriram Das. It will be directed by Sean Carter.

== See also ==
- Stephen King short fiction bibliography
