= Night Shift (short story collection) =

Book by Stephen King

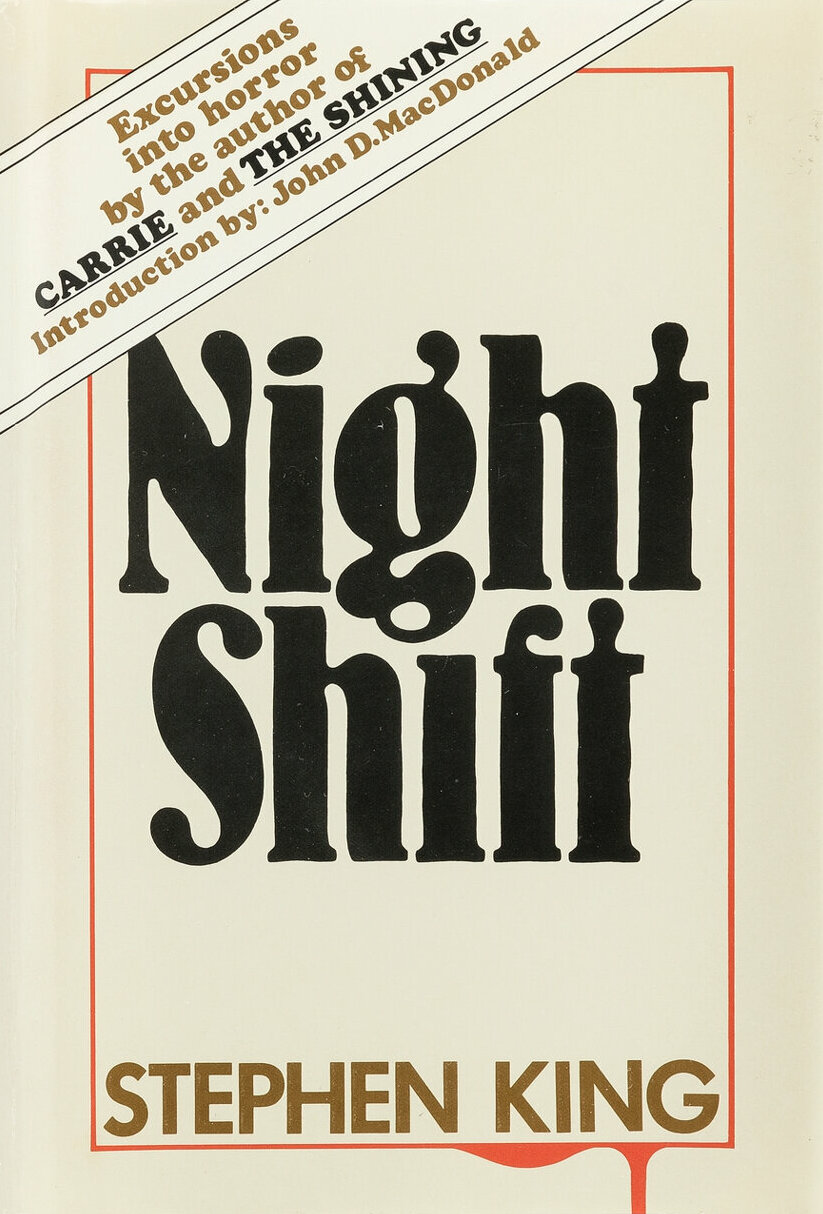
- First edition cover
- Author: Stephen King
- Language: English
- Genre: Horror
- Publisher: Doubleday
- Publication date: February 17, 1978
- Publication place: United States
- Media type: Print (hardcover)
- Pages: 336
- ISBN: 978-0-385-12991-6
- Followed by: Different Seasons

Night Shift is Stephen King's first collection of short stories, first published in 1978. In 1980, Night Shift won the Balrog Award for Best Collection, and in 1979 it was nominated as best collection for the Locus Award and the World Fantasy Award.

== Stories ==
#	Title	Originally published in
1	"Jerusalem's Lot"	Previously unpublished
2	"Graveyard Shift"	October 1970 issue of Cavalier
3	"Night Surf"	Spring 1969 issue of Ubris
4	"I Am the Doorway"	March 1971 issue of Cavalier
5	"The Mangler"	December 1972 issue of Cavalier
6	"The Boogeyman"	March 1973 issue of Cavalier
7	"Gray Matter"	October 1973 issue of Cavalier
8	"Battleground"	September 1972 issue of Cavalier
9	"Trucks"	June 1973 issue of Cavalier
10	"Sometimes They Come Back"	March 1974 issue of Cavalier
11	"Strawberry Spring"	Fall 1968 issue of Ubris
12	"The Ledge"	July 1976 issue of Penthouse
13	"The Lawnmower Man"	May 1975 issue of Cavalier
14	"Quitters, Inc."	Previously unpublished
15	"I Know What You Need"	September 1976 issue of Cosmopolitan
16	"Children of the Corn"	March 1977 issue of Penthouse
17	"The Last Rung on the Ladder"	Previously unpublished
18	"The Man Who Loved Flowers"	August 1977 issue of Gallery
19	"One for the Road"	March/April 1977 issue of Maine
20	"The Woman in the Room"	Previously unpublished

== Details ==
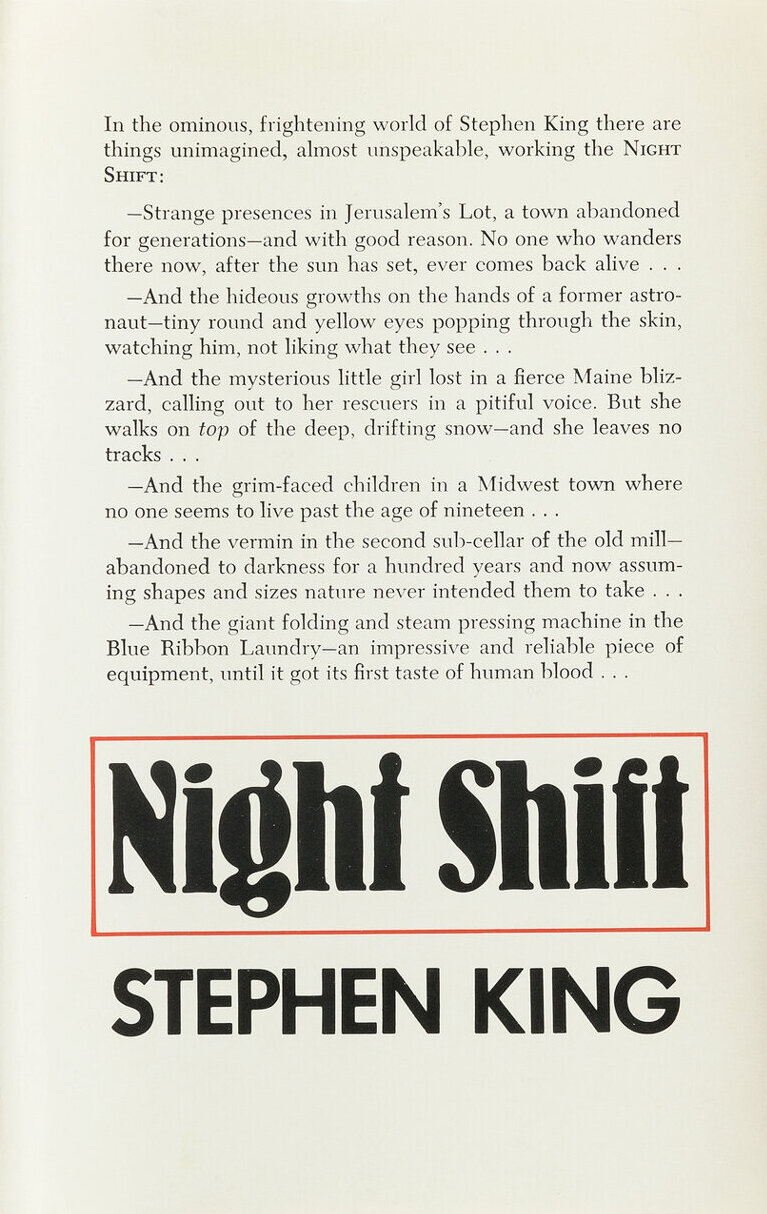
The back cover of the first edition of Night Shift

The book was published on the heels of The Shining (1977 Doubleday) and is King's fifth published book (including Rage, which was published under the pseudonym of Richard Bachman). Nine of the twenty stories had first appeared in issues of Cavalier Magazine from 1970 to 1975; others were originally published in Penthouse, Cosmopolitan, Gallery, Ubris, and Maine Magazine. The stories "Jerusalem's Lot", "Quitters, Inc.", "The Last Rung on the Ladder", and "The Woman in the Room" appeared for the first time in this collection.

King had wanted to cut "Gray Matter" in favor of his 1972 story "Suffer the Little Children", but deferred to editor Bill Thompson who chose to keep "Gray Matter" in the collection ("Suffer the Little Children" was ultimately collected in Nightmares & Dreamscapes in 1993).

== Foreword and introduction ==
Night Shift is the first book for which King wrote a foreword. The introduction was written by one of King's favorite authors, John D. MacDonald. MacDonald writes that "Stephen King is a far, far better writer at thirty than I was at thirty, or at forty. I am entitled to hate him a little bit for this." He adds, "I will say that I do not give a diddly-whoop what Stephen King chooses as an area in which to write. The fact that he presently enjoys writing in the field of spooks and spells and slitherings in the cellar is to me the least interesting fact about the man anyone can relate", predicting that "Stephen King is not going to restrict himself to his present area of intense interest."

== Deluxe edition ==
In 2020, a deluxe edition of Night Shift was published by Cemetery Dance Publications. The deluxe edition included two other short stories by King: "The Glass Floor" (1967) and "Weeds" (1976).

== Film, television or theatrical adaptations ==
With the publication of Night Shift and the rise in King's popularity as a best-selling author, and with the success of Brian De Palma's motion picture adaptation of Carrie (1976), student film makers began submitting requests to King to adapt stories from the collection. King formed a policy he deemed the Dollar Deal, which allowed the students the permission to make an adaptation for $1.

In the 1980s, entrepreneurial film producer Milton Subotsky purchased the rights to six of the stories in this collection to produce feature films and a television anthology based on multiple stories. Although Subotsky was involved with several King adaptations (Cat's Eye, Maximum Overdrive, Sometimes They Come Back, The Lawnmower Man) the television series never happened due to conflicts with the networks' Standards and Practices.

The following film, television, and theatre adaptations are adapted from the stories in Night Shift:

=== Feature film adaptations ===
- Children of the Corn (1984) Hal Roach Studios, Inc., directed by Fritz Kiersch
- Cat's Eye (1985) Dino De Laurentiis Productions/MGM/UA, directed by Lewis Teague (featured adaptations of "Quitters Inc." and "The Ledge")
- Maximum Overdrive (based on "Trucks") (1986) De Laurentiis Entertainment Group (DEG), directed by Stephen King
- Graveyard Shift (1990) Paramount Pictures, directed by Ralph S. Singleton
- The Mangler (1995) New Line Cinema, directed by Tobe Hooper
- The Boogeyman (2023) 20th Century Studios, directed by Rob Savage

=== Television adaptations ===
- Sometimes They Come Back (1991) Vidmark Entertainment, directed by Tom McLoughlin, originally attempted to be adapted into Cat's Eye
- Trucks (1997) USA Pictures directed by Chris Thomson
- Battleground (2006) Turner Network Television mini-series Nightmares & Dreamscapes
- Children of the Corn (2009) a Syfy production
- Gray Matter (2019) Shudder series Creepshow
- Chapelwaite (2021) based on the short story Jerusalem's Lot

=== Dollar Baby adaptations (shorts) ===
- The Boogeyman (1982) directed by Jeff Schiro
- Disciples of the Crow (based on "Children of the Corn") (1983) directed by John Woodward
- The Woman in the Room (1983) directed by Frank Darabont
- The Last Rung on the Ladder (1987) directed by James Cole and Daniel Thron
- The Lawnmower Man (1987) directed by Jim Gonis
- Night Surf (2001) directed by Peter Sullivan
- Strawberry Spring (2001) directed by Doveed Linder
- I Know What You Need (2004) directed by Shawn S. Lealos
- La Femme dans la chambre (The Woman in the Room) (2005) directed by Damien Maric
- The Boogeyman (play) (2005) by Graham Rees (60 minutes)

=== Other ===
- The Lawnmower Man (1992) New Line Cinema, directed by Brett Leonard – an unrelated film named in tribute to the story of the same name contained within this anthology

== The Stephen King Collection: Stories from Night Shift ==
The Stephen King Collection: Stories from Night Shift
- Author: Stephen King
- Audio read by: John Glover
- Language: English
- Genre: Short story collection
- Publisher: Random House Audio
- Publication place: United States
- Media type: Compact Disc, Digital Audio, MP3

In 2000, Random House released a recorded compilation of selected stories from Night Shift, each read by John Glover. The full track list of unabridged stories is as follows:

- "The Boogeyman"
- "I Know What You Need"
- "Strawberry Spring"
- "Gray Matter"
- "The Woman in the Room"
- "Battleground"
- "Graveyard Shift"
- "The Man Who Loved Flowers"
- "The Last Rung on the Ladder"
- "Night Surf"
- "Jerusalem's Lot"
- "The Lawnmower Man"
- "Sometimes They Come Back"
- "Quitters, Inc."
- "The Ledge"
- "The Mangler"

== See also ==
- Stephen King short fiction bibliography
- Dollar Baby
