= I Am the Doorway =

1971 short story by Stephen King

- Short story by Stephen King
- Country: United States
- Language: English
- Genres: Science fiction, Short story

Publication
- Published in: Night Shift
- Publisher: Doubleday
- Media type: Print (Hardcover)
- Publication date: 1978

"I Am the Doorway" is a science fiction short story by American writer Stephen King, first published in the March 1971 issue of Cavalier magazine, and later collected in King's 1978 collection Night Shift.

== Plot summary ==
After being exposed to an alien mutagen on a spaceflight to Venus, disabled former astronaut Arthur narrates the frightening changes he goes through. Arthur begins the narrative with his hands bandaged and complains of horrible itching both before and after the expedition. The transformation manifests as a swarm of tiny eyeballs on his fingertips. These eyes serve as the titular "doorway" for an extraterrestrial civilization, allowing them to peer into our world, but from an alien perspective; humans are hideous monstrosities that they fear and despise, according to Arthur.

Soon, the alien presence is able not only to peer through this portal, but also to take control of Arthur's shattered body and use him to perform heinous atrocities. Arthur douses his hands in kerosene and sets them on fire in a frantic bid to retain his humanity, only to discover that once the gateway is opened, it cannot be simply closed. For over seven years, he is able to keep the extraterrestrial presence at bay. However, as the aliens' eyes emerge on Arthur's chest, he announces that he intends to commit suicide with a shotgun to stop them from killing anyone else.

== Film adaptation ==
In 2009, the Czech director Robin Kašpařík obtained rights from King to adapt his short story into a non-profit short film. The film, Jsem brána (I Am the Doorway), was shot using the fulldome technology. The story was finally adapted as a short film by Robin Kašpařík in 2017. The film was shot in a first-person viewpoint, with the main character played by mime Radim Vizváry.

In 2015, British director Matthew J. Rowney produced the short story via the Dollar Baby campaign. The adaptation currently has the most international awards attached to a Dollar Baby movie. The film stars Greg Patmore and Luke Brandon Field in the title roles. As of 2015, the film was in postproduction.

In 2018, director Simon Pearce adapted the story into a short film by the same name. This adaptation, produced by noted independent filmmaker Robert Shulevitz, won multiple awards, including the Philip K. Dick Best Sci-Fi Short 2018.

== See also ==
- Stephen King short fiction bibliography
- "Cold Hands, Warm Heart"
