= All That You Love Will Be Carried Away =

- Short story by Stephen King
- Country: United States
- Language: English
- Genre: Short story

Publication
- Published in: The New Yorker
- Media type: Magazine
- Publication date: January 29, 2001

"All That You Love Will Be Carried Away" is a short story by Stephen King. It was originally published in the January 29, 2001 issue of The New Yorker.

== Plot summary ==
Alfie Zimmer, a traveling salesman peddling gourmet frozen foods, pulls into a Motel 6 in Nebraska for the night. He settles in and pulls out a revolver, ready to commit suicide because he can't "go on living the way he had been living". Alfie has a hobby of recording strange bathroom graffiti which he has discovered on his many long, lonely travels. He starts noting down scrawls on the walls that attracted his attention, gradually becoming fascinated with them. During his solitary travels, he has come to regard these "voices on the walls" as his friends as well as something to think about during the long drive, describing the messages as something precious and important that often "spoke" to him.

Alfie decides that "a shot in the mouth is easier than any living change" but every time he puts the gun in his mouth, he worries that leaving the notebook filled with bizarre ramblings behind will make him seem insane to whoever finds his body. Alfie wants to write a book about the graffiti, even coming up with a great title, but knows "the telling would hurt". While standing in the freezing cold of the winter night, sobbing to himself, Alfie decides on a plan: if the lights of a farmhouse behind the motel reappear through the snow before he counts to 60, he will write the book. If not, he will toss the notebook into the snow, then go inside and shoot himself.

The story closes with Alfie standing near the field outside the motel, starting to count, thus leaving the ending ambiguous.

== Publication ==
"All That You Love Will Be Carried Away" was originally published in the January 29, 2001 issue of The New Yorker magazine. In 2002, it was included in King's collection Everything's Eventual with minor variations.

== Reaction ==
Rocky Wood describes "All That You Love Will Be Carried Away" as "very much King in mainstream fiction mode" and as "a disturbing tale with hints of redemption [...] leavened by the humor contained in the graffiti Zimmer collects". Publishers Weekly described it as "an intensely moving story".

== Adaptations ==
In 2004, James Renner directed an adaptation of "All That You Love Will Be Carried Away". King granted Renner the rights to adapt this story as part of his Dollar Baby program for aspiring filmmakers. It was an official selection at the 2005 Montreal World Film Festival.

Other Dollar Baby adaptations have been made by Scott Albanese, Brian Berkowitz, Mark Montalto, Chi Laughlin, Natalie Mooallem, Anthony Kaneaster, Seth Friedman, Robert Sterling, Hendrik Harms, Chloe Brown, João Augusto de Nardo, Bolen Miller and Maria Delaossa.

== See also ==
- Stephen King short fiction bibliography
