= The Woman in the Room =

- Short story by Stephen King
- Country: United States
- Language: English
- Genres: Tragedy, short story

Publication
- Published in: Night Shift
- Publisher: Doubleday
- Media type: Print (Paperback)
- Publication date: 1978

"The Woman in the Room" is a short story by Stephen King, first published in King's 1978 collection Night Shift. It was adapted as a short film of the same name in 1983, directed by Frank Darabont at the beginning of his career.

== Plot summary ==
Johnny is burdened with remorse. He decides to euthanize his terminally ill mother, with painkillers.

== Film adaptation ==
Director Frank Darabont began his film career by adapting this story as a short film in 1983 as part of the Dollar Baby initiative. Darabont sent King a query letter in 1980 asking for permission to adapt the story. King agreed because he thought that students adapting short stories as films was a good idea.

== See also ==
- Stephen King short fiction bibliography
