= Sometimes They Come Back (film) =

1991 horror film directed by Tom McLoughlin

- Genre: Horror; Thriller; Drama
- Based on: "Sometimes They Come Back" by Stephen King
- Written by: Lawrence Konner
- Teleplay by: Mark Rosenthal
- Directed by: Tom McLoughlin
- Starring: Tim Matheson; Brooke Adams; Robert Rusler
- Theme music composer: Terry Plumeri
- Country of origin: United States
- Original language: English

Production
- Producers: Dino De Laurentiis; Michael S. Murphey
- Production locations: Kansas City, Kansas; Liberty, Missouri; Rocheport, Missouri
- Cinematography: Bryan England
- Editor: Charles Bornstein
- Running time: 97 minutes
- Production companies: Come Back Productions; Dino de Laurentiis Communications; Paradise Films

Original release
- Network: CBS
- Release: May 7, 1991

Related
- Sometimes They Come Back... Again

Sometimes They Come Back is a 1991 American supernatural horror film directed by Tom McLoughlin, written by Lawrence Konner and Mark Rosenthal, and starring Tim Matheson, Brooke Adams, and Robert Rusler. Based on Stephen King's 1974 short story "Sometimes They Come Back", the film follows Jim Norman (Matheson), a teacher who returns to his childhood hometown, where the teenage greasers responsible for his brother's murder 27 years earlier return from the dead and infiltrate his class.

The story was originally optioned for inclusion as a segment of the 1985 anthology film Cat's Eye, before producer Dino De Laurentiis developed it as a separate feature. Filming took place in Kansas City, Kansas, and several locations in Missouri, including Liberty and Rocheport. The latter was used for scenes set in the railway tunnel central to the story. The made-for-television film premiered on broadcast television network CBS on May 7, 1991.

Sometimes They Come Back received mixed reviews, with critics praising elements including its atmosphere, effects, and Matheson's performance while criticizing its pacing and handling of its premise. The film was followed by two direct-to-video sequels, Sometimes They Come Back... Again (1996) and Sometimes They Come Back... for More (1998).

== Plot ==
Jim Norman returns to his old hometown of Liberty, Missouri after accepting a teaching job there. He moves back along with his wife, Sally, and their son, Scott.

When Jim was nine, he had moved away from the small town with his parents after he had witnessed his older brother, Wayne, being murdered by a gang of greasers during a mugging in a train tunnel in 1963. Three of the murderers — Richard, Vinnie, and David — were killed shortly afterward by an oncoming train, having parked their 1955 Chevrolet One-Fifty on the tracks. The fourth member, Carl, survived after bailing out of the car.

After returning to his hometown, Jim starts having nightmares about his brother's murder. Soon afterward, three of his students are killed by the ghosts of his brother's murderers, and, their killers, Richard, Vinnie, and David return from the dead as students in Jim's class. The police are suspicious of Jim's proximity to the dead students.

On the 27th anniversary of Wayne's murder, the revived killers challenge Jim to a confrontation. Shortly after, they make an attempt on his son's life with their car. Jim discovers Wayne's spirit is stuck in limbo while the matter of his murder is unsettled. It is revealed that when Jim was a boy, he had taken the murderers' car keys which led to their deaths.

Jim goes to the Cemetery and finds the graves of the greasers. The three gang members appear, ominously telling Jim that the wreck survivor Carl must complete their revenge. Jim tracks down the now-adult Carl using a phone book. He forces him to return to the tunnel; however, Carl does not believe Jim and flees.

The gang forcibly enters Jim's house, threatening Sally and Scott. However, Jim forces them to leave. He then takes Scott and Sally to a church, where the demonic gang cannot enter.

Jim returns to his abandoned childhood home and finds the old car keys that he took on the day of his brother's murder. Carl reappears and apologizes for Wayne's death. He then states he is no longer afraid and is ready for the confrontation. However, as they leave the house, the gang forces Carl to leave with them. The greasers trick Jim's family into leaving the church; Scott and Sally are taken hostage by the gang to ensure Jim will go through with the reenactment.

Jim returns to the train tunnel in which Wayne's murder took place. The greasers plan to kill Jim the same way they murdered Wayne and take Jim with them. However, Carl defies the other gang members and defends Jimmy. Enraged, Lawson stabs Carl to death. This allows Wayne to return from limbo. The gang members attempt to murder Wayne once again, but Jim distracts them by throwing the keys on the ground. As Jim rescues his family from the gang's car, a ghost train appears (in the form of the train that killed the gang members 27 years ago). Realizing this is the endgame, Jim taunts the gang leader: "It's all over, Lawson. Now you can go to hell!" Having recovered their keys, the gang attempts to escape in their car (again parked on the tracks). However, they are run over in their car by the ghost train, sending them back to Hell. The ghost train promptly disappears. Wayne is finally at peace and moves on to the afterlife. The movie ends with Jim, Sally, and Scott leaving the tunnel to return home.

== Cast ==
- Tim Matheson as Jim Norman
  - Zachary Ball as Young Jim Norman
- Brooke Adams as Sally Norman
- Chris Demetral as Wayne Norman
- Robert Rusler as Richard Lawson
- Robert Hy Gorman as Scott Norman
- Nicholas Sadler as Vinnie Vincent
- Bentley Mitchum as David North
- William Sanderson as Carl Mueller
  - Don Ruffin as Young Carl Mueller
- Chadd Nyerges as Chip Conway
- Tasia Valenza as Kate Slavin
- Matt Nolan as Billy Sterns
- William Kuhlke as Principal Simmons
- T. Max Graham as Chief Pappas

== Production notes ==
The original short story, "Sometimes They Come Back", is set in Stratford High School in Stratford, Connecticut. The film adaptation was filmed in Kansas City, Kansas, and Liberty, Missouri.

The car used by the greasers was a 1955 Chevrolet One-Fifty.

The film is based on a short story by Stephen King that was first published in the March 1974 issue of Cavalier, and later collected in King's 1978 collection Night Shift.

The steam locomotive used in the film was Southern Pacific 5021 using Norfolk and Western 1218's whistle.

The train tunnel scenes were filmed in Rocheport, Missouri, on the former Missouri-Kansas-Texas Railroad. The tunnel is now part of the Katy Trail.

== Reception ==
The film received an approval rating of 45% on review aggregator Rotten Tomatoes based on 29 reviews, its consensus reads: "Doling out a few eerie moments bolstered by gruesome effects and Tim Matheson's gripping performance, Sometimes They Come Back squanders its chilling premise through drawn-out pacing and uneven tension that ultimately drain its intended dread."

Ray Loynd of the Los Angeles Times called it "a tight, moody work". TV Guide rated it a two out of five stars and wrote that "the solid cast can't lift the material above the routine".

== Sequels ==
The TV film was followed by two straight-to-video sequels in 1996 (Sometimes They Come Back... Again) and 1998 (Sometimes They Come Back... for More).

== Home media ==
Sometimes They Come Back was originally released on VHS by Vidmark Entertainment, and later on DVD in 1999 by Trimark Home Video. On September 11, 2007, a new DVD edition of the film was released by 20th Century Fox Home Entertainment through the film's current owner, Metro-Goldwyn-Mayer. Olive Films released the film on Blu-Ray in October 2015.
