= Sometimes They Come Back =

1974 short story by Stephen King

- Short story by Stephen King
- Country: United States
- Language: English
- Genres: Horror, Short story

Publication
- Published in: Cavalier
- Media type: Magazine
- Publication date: March 1974

"Sometimes They Come Back" is a short story by Stephen King, first published in the March 1974 issue of Cavalier and later collected in King's 1978 collection Night Shift.

== Plot summary ==
In 1957, nine-year-old Jim Norman and his twelve-year-old brother, Wayne, walk to the local library to return Jim's books. They are attacked by a gang of local greasers. Wayne is stabbed to death by two of the older boys, but Jim escapes. Throughout his life, Jim is haunted by nightmares that vividly reenact the murder.

In 1974, Jim is married and starts a new job as a high-school English teacher. All seems to go well until after the Christmas holiday. Jim learns that one of his students was killed in a hit and run accident. A new student is added to Jim's class. Jim recognizes the boy as Robert Lawson, one of the greasers who killed his brother. Lawson appears to be the same age as he was in 1957.

Another student falls to her death a week later, and another of the greasers, David Garcia, joins Jim's class. He also appears to be the same age as he was in 1957.

When the class troublemaker expresses to Jim his concerns about the suspicious new arrivals, then mysteriously drops out of school, a third greaser, Vincent 'Vinnie' Corey, joins the class. Terrified, Jim calls an old acquaintance, Donald Nell, a policeman who knew him and his brother in 1957. Donald reveals that the three greasers died soon after Wayne's murder; they were fleeing police in a high-speed car chase only to collide with a telephone pole, causing all three to be electrocuted.

Jim does not tell his wife Sally about the greasers, believing it would be better for her not to know. Sally is killed while riding a taxi cab when the resurrected greasers force the vehicle off the road. Finally, after consulting a book of spells, Jim summons a demon; cutting off his own index fingers as a blood sacrifice, he asks that it defeat the undead greasers. In response, the demon takes the shape of Wayne, who overpowers the greasers and takes their souls to Hell. As it leaves, the demon promises that it will return, and Jim recalls a warning from the book: although demons can be summoned and banished, "sometimes they come back".

== Publication ==
"Sometimes They Come Back" was first published in the March 1974 issue of Cavalier. In 1978, it was collected in King's first book of short stories, Night Shift.

== Adaptations ==
A TV movie adaptation starring Tim Matheson as Jim aired in 1991. The story was originally planned to be part of the 1985 film Cat's Eye, which includes two other stories adapted from Night Shift ("The Ledge" and "Quitters, Inc"). However, producers thought the segment would do better on its own. In the film adaptation, Jimmy's brother Wayne comes back after Mueller (one of the original greasers who had survived the crash) sacrifices himself; he learned from the resurrected greasers that a dead person can come back when a living person dies. Jim's wife is not killed. Wayne's return is not sinister, and instead gives Wayne closure, allowing him to move on to the afterlife.

The TV movie was followed by two straight-to-video sequels in 1996 (Sometimes They Come Back... Again) and 1998 (Sometimes They Come Back... for More).

== See also ==
- Stephen King short fiction bibliography
