= Cain Rose Up =

1968 horror short story by Stephen King

- Short story by Stephen King
- Country: United States
- Language: English
- Genres: Horror, short story

Publication
- Published in: Skeleton Crew
- Publisher: Putnam
- Media type: Print (Hardcover)
- Publication date: 1968 (in Ubris); 1985 (in Skeleton Crew)

"Cain Rose Up" is a horror short story by American writer Stephen King. It was originally published in the Spring 1968 issue of Ubris magazine, and collected in King's Skeleton Crew in 1985. It deals with a depressed and homicidal college student, Curt Garrish, who goes on a murderous sniper rampage from his dormitory room.

== Plot summary ==
Curt Garrish is a college student who lives in one of the campus dorms. At the end of a spring semester, he returns to his room after a particularly hard exam. He talks to a couple of his fellow students and the dorm's resident assistant, who tells him to fill out a damage form. Garrish's roommate, an untidy student nicknamed Piggy, has already left for the semester. Garrish takes out a hunting rifle hidden in his closet. Rifles are permitted on campus with proper documentation for use at the campus shooting range. Garrish checked out the rifle and hid it in the woods, retrieving it late at night while everyone slept. He field strips and loads it from a box of ammunition. After talking to another student named Bailey, who takes the nude model pin-ups from over Piggy's bed, Garrish relates the story of Cain and Abel, then opens a window and begins to hunt for targets outside. His first shot kills a pretty blonde student. His next shots take out her parents, then other students as they try to run. Garrish sees another student trying to hide and wanting to run but is frozen with fear. Garrish pulls the trigger again.

== Film adaptation ==
The story was adapted into a short film as part of the Dollar Baby project in 1989. It was directed by David C. Spillers.

The story was adapted into a short film in 2013. It was directed by Ranjeet S. Marwa.

The story was adapted into a short film in 2017. It was directed by Jesse James Marshall.

The short story was adapted once again in 2022 by Miguel Alejandro Marquez, with actor Steven Braunstein starring as Curt.

== See also ==
- Stephen King short fiction bibliography
- Rage (King novel)
- University of Texas tower shooting
- School shooting
