= The Lawnmower Man =

1975 short story by Stephen King

- Short story by Stephen King
- Country: United States
- Language: English
- Genres: Horror, science fiction

Publication
- Published in: Cavalier, Night Shift
- Publication type: Periodical
- Media type: Print (magazine, book)
- Publication date: May 1975

"The Lawnmower Man" is a short story by American writer Stephen King, first published in the May 1975 issue of Cavalier and later included in King's 1978 collection Night Shift.

== Plot ==
Harold Parkette, a suburban homeowner, once took pride in his well-maintained lawn but became traumatized after a neighborhood boy accidentally mowed over a cat while cutting his grass the previous year. Disgusted, Harold sells his lawnmower and neglects hiring a replacement, allowing his lawn to grow wildly overgrown throughout the summer. Desperate to restore order, Harold finds an ad for "Pastoral Greenery and Outdoor Services" and hires them. A fat, crude man arrives in a van and begins the job. To Harold's horror, the man strips naked, and the powerful red lawnmower operates autonomously, maniacally tearing through the tall grass while spewing exhaust. The naked man crawls behind it on all fours, devouring the fresh clippings like an animal. Harold watches in terror as the mower deliberately swerves to shred a fleeing mole. Overcome, he faints.

Upon waking, he confronts the man, who casually explains this bizarre method is an efficient new practice by their "boss" that advances a greater purpose, requiring occasional "sacrifices" to keep things running smoothly. He reveals the boss is the Greek nature god Pan, and praises the grass in a cult-like manner. Terrified, Harold attempts to call the police to report indecent exposure, but the lawnmower bursts into the house, pursuing him. The naked man regretfully notes Harold's mistake in involving authorities. Harold flees but is ultimately caught and killed by the rampaging mower in a sacrificial ritual.

Police later investigate the scene, finding Harold's remains scattered (much of it in the bird bath) amid the perfectly manicured lawn. They dismiss the bizarre circumstances as the work of heat-induced madness or a deranged sex maniac. As they leave, the ironically pleasant scent of freshly cut grass lingers in the air.

== Adaptations ==
- The story was adapted in graphic form in Bizarre Adventures #29 (December 1981). The adaptation features the original text of the short story, accompanied by art by Walt Simonson. Publisher IDW rereleased the story in a portfolio edition shot from the original art in 2014.
- A twelve-minute Dollar Baby short film, The Lawnmower Man: A Suburban Nightmare, was released in 1987. It was written by future screenwriter and New Line Cinema production executive Michael De Luca (In the Mouth of Madness) and directed by James Gonis. The film was shot in 1985 while Gonis was a junior at New York University. Originally budgeted at $800, the final film ultimately cost nearly $5,000. It has screened at several film festivals: New York University; at Horrorfest 1989, a screening of King films at the Stanley Hotel (the hotel that inspired King's novel The Shining); a New York film festival of Greek-American filmmakers in 1991; and at the 1st Annual Dollar Baby festival in Orono, Maine in 2004.
- A feature film, The Lawnmower Man, starring Jeff Fahey and Pierce Brosnan, was released in 1992 by New Line Cinema. This film used an original screenplay entitled "CyberGod", borrowing only the title of the short story. The film concerns a scientist, Dr. Lawrence Angelo (Brosnan), who subjects mentally challenged gardener Jobe Smith (Fahey) to virtual reality experiments which give him superhuman abilities. The film was originally titled Stephen King's The Lawnmower Man. King won a lawsuit to have his name removed from the film, stating in court documents that the film "bore no meaningful resemblance" to his story. King then won further damages in 1993 after his name was included in the home video release.

== See also ==
- Stephen King short fiction bibliography
