= I Know What You Need =

1976 short story by Stephen King

- Short story by Stephen King
- Country: United States
- Language: English
- Genres: Horror, fantasy

Publication
- Published in: Night Shift
- Publisher: Doubleday
- Media type: Print (Paperback)
- Publication date: 1978

"I Know What You Need" is a fantasy/horror short story by American writer Stephen King, first published in the September 1976 issue of Cosmopolitan, and later collected in King's 1978 collection Night Shift.

== Plot summary ==
Elizabeth Rogan, a popular college student, meets social outcast Ed Hamner when she is cramming for a sociology final. Ed offers to buy Elizabeth a strawberry ice cream cone, which was on her mind, and offers her exam notes to the final, claiming he has already completed the class. She gets an 'A' on the final, saving her scholarship, but informs Ed that she has a boyfriend named Tony Lombard.

What Elizabeth anticipated to be a great summer turns out to be anything but, as tips at her job at a seaside resort are sparse due to a combination of poor weather and high gas prices. At the same time, Tony is pressuring her to get married, claiming his construction job can provide for them both. Tony dies one week later while performing road work when he is struck by a Fiat whose brake lines inexplicably melt. Ed reappears at this time; in October, the two begin dating, with Ed seeming to be the perfect boyfriend.

Elizabeth's roommate Alice repeatedly warns her that Ed is being manipulative by setting up circumstances to make himself seem perfect. Alice's father hires a detective agency to do a background check on Ed, and it is revealed that he had attended the same elementary school as Elizabeth but moved away when his father, a compulsive gambler, fled mob-connected debt collectors. Ed's father used his son's gift to reverse his fortunes at gambling, and later invest in the stock market. Ed's mother, a religious woman, had been institutionalized due to stabbing Ed, making rambling claims of him being the "devil's henchman." The background check also shows that Ed was never enrolled in courses at Elizabeth's college and thus could not have attended the sociology course the previous term. The roommate also reveals that Ed's father died in an accident along with his wife in a manner similar to Tony's death; they had been out picnicking when their car careened over a cliff. As Ed was the sole surviving member of the family, he inherited his father's stock portfolio worth $1,000,000 (equivalent to $4,936,000 in 2025).

Visiting Ed's home, Elizabeth finds how his residence is akin to a Potemkin village, where his bedroom is a mess, reflecting his unkempt personal appearance, whereas the front is well kept, likely to impress Elizabeth and other guests. Elizabeth locates a diary Ed has kept, documenting how he has secretly craved her love since childhood and employed a variety of black magic rituals and charms to manipulate her and murder Tony. She finds voodoo dolls of his parents, as well as herself. Other items she finds are an answer key with "BETH" written in grease pencil on it, and a toy model of a Fiat with a piece of one of Tony's shirts affixed to it.

Ed confronts Elizabeth and calls her an "ungrateful bitch," to which she accuses Ed of killing Tony. Ed fully admits to using his powers to eliminate Tony, defending himself by saying he did it for her to save her from an unhappy marriage. Elizabeth destroys her voodoo doll and leaves the house with Ed's magical artifacts, while a furious Ed swears after her that Elizabeth will come back to him. While walking she passes over a bridge and throws Ed's voodoo dolls over the rail, throwing the toy model of the Fiat last.

== References to other works ==
- One of the books Ed has is the Necronomicon from the Cthulhu Mythos.
- The setting of the story is 1973 to 1974, as the 1973 oil crisis and The Godfather are mentioned.

== Film versions ==
In 2005, Shawn S. Lealos directed a short Dollar Baby film based on this story under Starving Dogs Productions.

Another short Dollar Baby film version of the story was filmed in July 2021 through crowdfunding and is directed and produced by Julia Marchese, who cites the story as her favorite among King's works. A teaser trailer was released on August 30, 2022. The film premiered at the 2023 Maine International Film Festival.

== See also ==
- Stephen King short fiction bibliography
