= Battleground (short story) =

- Short story by Stephen King
- Country: United States
- Language: English
- Genres: Horror, Fantasy, short story

Publication
- Published in: Night Shift
- Publisher: Doubleday
- Media type: Print (Hardcover)
- Publication date: 1972

"Battleground" is a fantasy short story by American writer Stephen King, first published in the September 1972 issue of Cavalier magazine, and later collected in King's 1978 collection Night Shift.

== Plot summary ==
Renshaw is a professional hit-man, who returns from his assassination of a toy-maker to find a package delivered to his penthouse apartment in the Bay Area. The package contains a G.I. Joe Vietnam footlocker, sent to him by the mother of the toy-maker he had recently killed. When he opens the package, he finds that the toy soldiers are alive with working copies (albeit miniature) of weapons, jeeps, and helicopters. To Renshaw's surprise, the tiny soldiers begin to attack him. Despite his training and experience as a hitman, Renshaw finds himself outnumbered and outgunned, and he cedes control of the living room to the toy soldiers, taking cover in the bathroom. As the soldiers establish a base camp on his dining table, they unveil more and more military hardware, ranging from shoulder-launched rockets to military attack helicopters. The soldiers pass a piece of paper under the door, demanding his surrender, but Renshaw writes "NUTS" on the paper and sends it back, prompting a barrage of rocket fire which destroys most of the door.

Renshaw eventually plots to destroy the soldiers with a Molotov cocktail constructed from a bottle of lighter fluid, but before the cocktail detonates, a massive blast destroys the entire apartment. Outside in a park below, a couple finds Renshaw's bloody shirt, and the other contents of the footlocker are revealed, including one made-to-scale thermonuclear weapon.

== Film and TV adaptations ==
"Battleground" was converted to a teleplay by Richard Christian Matheson for the television series Nightmares & Dreamscapes. Originally airing on Wednesday July 12, 2006, the episode was directed by Brian Henson and starred William Hurt as Renshaw the assassin. There is no dialogue in the entire episode.

The episode featured a longer ending than the short story, in which Renshaw is attacked again and makes it out of the penthouse for a final showdown in the elevator shaft with an angry plastic commando (played by an uncredited Bill Barretta). Renshaw defeats the final commando, only to find it has armed a thermonuclear weapon that then explodes and kills him.

The story was also made into an animated short film, Srazhenie ru:Сражение (мультфильм) (Russian: Сражение - meaning "Battle"; see External Links below) by the Soviet Kievnauchfilm studio in 1986, directed by Mikhail Titov.

A similar concept was used in the 1981 anthology series Darkroom. The segment, titled "The Siege of 31 August," involved a Vietnam Vet turned farmer that discovers the army men he purchased for his son have come to life.

A similar story plays out in Small Soldiers. In the film, a group of "Commando Elite" army toys fight in and around an American family home.

== See also ==
- Stephen King short fiction bibliography
