= Graveyard Shift (short story) =

- Short story by Stephen King
- Cavalier, October 1970
- Country: United States
- Language: English
- Genres: Horror, short story

Publication
- Published in: Night Shift
- Publisher: Doubleday
- Media type: Print (Hardcover)
- Publication date: 1970 (magazine); 1978 (collection)

"Graveyard Shift" is a short story by Stephen King, first published in the October 1970 issue of Cavalier magazine and collected in King's 1978 collection Night Shift. It was adapted into a 1990 film of the same name.

== Setting ==
Graveyard Shift is set in Gates Falls, a small town in Maine, and the action largely takes place in a textile mill.

== Plot summary ==
A young drifter named Hall works at a decrepit textile mill in a small town in Maine when the cruel foreman, Warwick, recruits him and others to help with a massive cleaning effort. The old mill's basement has been abandoned for 12 years, and over time, a monumental infestation of rats has taken hold.

Cut off from the rest of nature, this rat empire has evolved into a strange and varied collection of creatures, complete with its own bizarre, self-sustaining ecosystem. There are cat-sized rats; three-foot-tall rats without eyes and hind legs; and bat-like rats. The men eventually come across a sub-basement, locked from the inside. Warwick then enlists Hall to go down and investigate the sub-basement, and says he may take whomever he likes. Hall chooses Warwick, who, despite trying to prevent them from entering, is forced to press on.

As they make their way through the sub-basement, Hall and Warwick discover that it harbors something more terrifying and hideous than any of them could have dreamed—a cow-sized queen rat with no eyes or legs, whose only purpose is to endlessly breed more rats. Hall sprays Warwick with a hose they were using to attack the rats. As the queen devours Warwick, Hall makes his way towards the exit while spraying the rats. However, he is overwhelmed and eaten alive by the hordes of mutated rats. Meanwhile, the other team of workers on the surface wonders what happened to them and, with no idea what kind of horror awaits, prepares to descend into the sub-basement.

== See also ==
- Stephen King short fiction bibliography
- The Rats, a 1974 novel by James Herbert
