= Strawberry Spring =

1968 short story by Stephen King

- Short story by Stephen King
- Country: United States
- Language: English
- Genres: Horror, Short story

Publication
- Published in: Night Shift
- Publisher: Doubleday
- Media type: Print (Hardcover)
- Publication date: 1978

"Strawberry Spring" is a horror short story by Stephen King. It was originally published in the Fall 1968 issue of Ubris magazine, then republished in the November 1975 issue of Cavalier magazine, and, heavily revised, collected in King's Night Shift in 1978.

== Plot ==
"Strawberry Spring" takes place at a fictional New England college, New Sharon College. The story is set in March 1968, starting on March 16, 1968.

An unnamed narrator sees the words "Springheel Jack" in a newspaper. It rekindles memories of about eight years earlier, when he was at New Sharon College. His recollections are nostalgic, almost melancholy.

It was March 16, 1968, when the strawberry spring, a "false" spring much like an Indian summer, arrived. It brought a thick fog that covered the campus at nighttime, providing perfect cover for a serial killer called "Springheel Jack". The body of a girl was found in a parking lot, the first murder in a series. Several more female students were murdered during the strawberry spring. The narrator describes the college community's reactions during this time and the contradictory rumors that spread about the victims. The police arrested Carl Amalara, the boyfriend of the first victim, for the crime. Another murder was committed while Amalara was in custody, and the police were forced to release him. The investigation was made more difficult by the fearful panic of police officers, security guards (an incident is recounted in which an unconscious student is misidentified as a corpse by a terrified security guard), and the students. No legitimate suspects were found.

Eight years later, a new strawberry spring arrives, and so does "Springheel Jack", who has taken another victim at New Sharon College. The narrator realizes he is Springheel Jack, despite having no memory of his actions.

== Adaptation ==
In 2021, Audio Up Media and iHeart Media released a podcast adaptation of the short story. Lee Metzger served as the producer for the series, which ran for eight episodes starting in September 2021. The series marked the first time that one of King's works was officially adapted in podcast form. The podcast starred Garrett Hedlund as the protagonist and narrator for the series, as well as Milo Ventimiglia, Herizen F. Guardiola, Sydney Sweeney, Ken Marino, Al Madrigal, and Brec Bassinger.

The podcast retains the setting and time period of the original story while expanding it to include information about the narrator, additional characters, and backstory to the narrator's life. The story follows Henry through the '60s, while he was a student, and in the '70s, after he became a professor. It follows him as he investigates the murders in both time periods while also reflecting on his time in an orphanage, after the death of his mother and brother in a car accident while they were driving through a similar strawberry spring. It is eventually revealed that Henry is the murderer, killing while in a dissociative state caused by the car accident, which he finds was caused by his abusive father chasing after his mother while she tried fleeing for their safety. It is heavily implied that Henry murdered his mother by breaking her neck as an act of mercy, as she was severely injured by the accident. The series ends with Henry murdering one of the people who were aware that he is the killer and him vowing to kill another who he suspects already knows, while also celebrating the birth of his new daughter.

== See also ==
- Indian summer
- Stephen King short fiction bibliography
