= Jerusalem's Lot =

1978 short story by Stephen King

- Short story by Stephen King
- Country: United States
- Language: English
- Genre: Horror short story

Publication
- Published in: Night Shift
- Publisher: Doubleday
- Media type: Print (Hardcover)
- Publication date: 1978

Chronology
—	'Salem's Lot

"Jerusalem's Lot" is a short story by Stephen King, first published in King's 1978 collection Night Shift. The story was also printed in the illustrated 2005 edition of King's 1975 novel 'Salem's Lot.

== Setting and style ==
"Jerusalem's Lot" is an epistolary short story set in the fictional town of Preacher's Corners, Cumberland County, Maine, in 1850. It is told through a series of letters and diary entries, mainly those of its main character, aristocrat Charles Boone, although his manservant, Calvin McCann, also occasionally assumes the role of narrator.

== Plot ==
Charles Boone, in letters addressed to "Bones", describes the arrival of himself and his manservant, Calvin McCann, at Chapelwaite, the neglected ancestral home of Charles's estranged late cousin Stephen. Calvin learns that many people in the nearby Maine town of Preacher's Corners think Charles and Calvin are mad for living in the mansion. The house is said to be "a bad house" with a history of sad events, disappearances, and mysterious noises which Charles attributes to "rats in the walls". Calvin finds a hidden compartment in the library containing an old map of a deserted village called Jerusalem's Lot, a mysterious area the townsfolk avoid. Their curiosity piqued, Charles and Calvin set out to explore the village.

The two find a decayed Puritan settlement. Nothing, including animals, has set foot in the town since its abandonment. Exploring a church, they discover an obscene parody of the Madonna and Child and an inverted cross. At the pulpit, they find a book filled with Latin and Druidic runes entitled De Vermis Mysteriis, or "The Mysteries of the Worm". When Charles touches the book, the church shakes, and something gigantic moves in the ground beneath. The two flee the village.

The Preacher's Corners' inhabitants begin fearing Charles. They chase him from one house with rocks and guns. Charles asks Mrs. Cloris, Chapelwaite's former maid, for information about Jerusalem's Lot. She reveals a rift in Charles' family caused by his grandfather, Robert Boone, trying to steal De Vermis Mysteriis from his brother, Philip (presumably to destroy it). Philip was a minister involved in the occult who, on October 31, 1789, vanished along with the population of Jerusalem's Lot. Charles dismisses it as superstition but cannot forget what he saw in the church.

Calvin discovers a diary in the library, encrypted with a rail fence cipher. Before he can decipher it, Charles takes him into the cellar to check for rats. Hidden behind the walls they find the undead corpses of two of his relatives, Marcella and Randolph Boone. Charles recognizes them as "nosferatu". The two flee the cellar, and Calvin seals the trapdoor.

As Charles recovers from the encounter, Calvin cracks the cipher. The diary, written by Robert Boone, details the history of Jerusalem's Lot and the events leading to the mass disappearance. The village was founded by one of Charles' distant ancestors, James Boon, who was the leader of an inbred witchcraft cult. Philip and Robert took up residence in Chapelwaite, Philip was taken in by Boon's cult, and he acquired De Vermis Mysteriis at Boon's behest. Philip and Boon used the book to call forth a supernatural entity referred to as "The Worm". In his final entry, Robert curses the whip-poor-will birds that have descended upon Chapelwaite.

Charles feels compelled to return to Jerusalem's Lot. Calvin tries to stop him but finally relents and accompanies his master. They discover a butchered lamb on the church altar, lying on top of De Vermis Mysteriis. Charles moves the lamb and takes the book to destroy it, but a congregation of undead appears, including Philip and Boon. Charles becomes possessed and begins chanting, summoning forth the Worm. Calvin knocks down Charles, freeing him from possession. Charles sets fire to the book. The Worm lashes out from below, killing Calvin before disappearing. Before Charles can recover Calvin's body, Boon forces Charles to flee. In his final letter to "Bones", Charles announces his intention to commit suicide, ending the Boone family line.

An "editor's note" attributes Charles's letters and the death of Calvin to insanity rather than supernatural occurrences in Jerusalem's Lot. The editor notes that Charles was not the last of his line: a bastard relative still exists, the editor himself, James Robert Boone, who has moved to Chapelwaite to restore the family name. James notes that Charles was right about one thing: "This place badly needs the services of an exterminator. There are some huge rats in the walls, by the sound." The note is dated October 2, the same date as Charles' first letter.

== Adaptations ==
=== Illustrated edition ===
Artist Glenn Chadbourne adapted "Jerusalem's Lot" for The Secretary of Dreams, a collection of comic versions and illustrated texts of six King short stories released by Cemetery Dance in December 2006.

=== Television ===
In December 2019, Epix announced it had commissioned a straight-to-series order of 10 episodes for a television adaptation starring Adrien Brody as Captain Charles Boone. In March 2020, Emily Hampshire joined the cast in the role of Rebecca Morgan. The show is titled Chapelwaite.

Filming of Chapelwaite was set to begin in March 2020, but had to be postponed due to the COVID-19 pandemic. On July 5, 2020, filming began in Nova Scotia, and was set to wrap up on December 18, 2020. The show premiered on August 22, 2021.

== See also ==
- Stephen King short fiction bibliography
- Salem's Lot
- "One for the Road" – 1977 sequel of 'Salem's Lot
