= The Boogeyman (short story) =

1973 short story by Stephen King

- Short story by Stephen King
- Country: United States
- Language: English
- Genres: Horror, short story

Publication
- Published in: Night Shift
- Publisher: Doubleday
- Media type: Print (hardcover)
- Publication date: 1978

"The Boogeyman" is a short story by Stephen King, first published in the March 1973 issue of the magazine Cavalier and later included in King's 1978 collection, Night Shift.

== Plot summary ==
The story takes place in the office of Dr. Harper, a psychiatrist, where a man named Lester Billings talks to the doctor about the "murders" of his three young children, describing the events of the past several years. His first two children died mysteriously of apparently unrelated causes (diagnosed as crib death and convulsions, respectively) when left alone in their bedrooms. The only commonalities were that the children cried "boogeyman!" before being left alone, and the closet door being ajar after discovering their corpses, even though Lester is certain the door was shut.

Approximately a year after their second child's death, Lester's wife, Rita, becomes pregnant with their son Andy, and the family subsequently moves to a different neighborhood, far from the old one. A year passes without incident, with Andy sleeping in the master bedroom with Lester and Rita. Lester believes that the monster has tracked his family, intruding in the house and slithering around at night. Not long after, Rita leaves to take care of her ill mother, leaving Lester and Andy alone.

Feeling the malevolent presence growing bolder in his wife's absence, Lester begins to panic and decides to move Andy to a separate bedroom, knowing that the monster will attack him. That night, Andy cries "boogeyman!" while being put to bed and, an hour later, is attacked and killed by the boogeyman. Lester, upon seeing the creature throttling Andy, flees to a local 24-hour diner. He later returns home at dawn, calls the police, and discovers Andy's corpse on the floor with the closet door ajar. Lester convinces the police that Andy attempted to climb out of his crib during the night and broke his neck.

As Lester finishes his story and starts to leave, Dr. Harper recommends making future appointments with the nurse. Finding the nurse absent, Lester returns to Harper's office and finds it empty, with the closet door ajar. The boogeyman emerges from the closet, casting off its disguise of Dr. Harper.

== Adaptations ==
The story was adapted into a short film by Jeff C. Schiro in 1982.

A feature film of the same name was released on June 2, 2023, by 20th Century Studios. Written by Scott Beck, Bryan Woods, and Mark Heyman, and directed by Rob Savage, it stars Sophie Thatcher, Chris Messina, David Dastmalchian, Marin Ireland, Vivien Lyra Blair, and Madison Hu.

== See also ==
- Stephen King short fiction bibliography
