= Gray Matter (short story) =

1973 short story by Stephen King

- Short story by Stephen King
- Country: United States
- Language: English
- Genre: Horror

Publication
- Published in: Cavalier
- Publisher: DuGent Publishing Corporation
- Media type: Print
- Publication date: October 1973

"Gray Matter" (also titled "Grey Matter") is a short story by Stephen King, first published in the October 1973 issue of Cavalier magazine, and later collected in King's 1978 collection Night Shift.

== Plot summary ==
The story, told from the perspective of an older "local" man, begins as he is sitting around at a convenience store in Bangor, Maine with a group of his friends during a heavy snowstorm. A young boy runs in, deathly afraid. The men recognize him as the son of Richie Grenadine, a local man who was injured some time ago in a work accident, and was given lifetime workers' compensation. With no need to support himself, Richie has become a recluse, rarely seen outside the confines of his apartment except to purchase the cheapest of beer, although lately, he had been sending his son out to purchase his beer for him.

After speaking privately with Richie's son, a group of men, including the narrator and store owner Henry, decide to take the beer to Richie personally. On their way, Henry relates some of the terrifying experiences the kid told him — of how one day his father drank a "bad" can of beer, implied to carry a mutagen, and since then has been slowly transforming into an inhuman blob-like abomination that detests light and craves warm beer. Spying on him one night, the boy saw his father eat a dead cat, causing him to finally seek help.

Arriving at Richie's home, the men confront Richie from behind his closed door, demanding that he come out. The odor pouring out from behind the door convinces the group that Richie has been eating more than dead cats, speculating that he may be responsible for a recent rash of missing people. The men are horrified when Richie opens the door and shambles out, resembling more fungus than man. The rest of the men run off as Henry stands his ground, firing his pistol at the creature. The story ends with the narrator recalling how his brief glimpse of the creature made him realize it was in the process of dividing in two and calculating the exponential growth the creature is capable of, as they sit at the convenience store, waiting to find out whether Henry or the creature survived.

== Relation to other works ==
"Gray Matter" is set in the same area as King's novel Dreamcatcher.

== Publication ==
"Gray Matter" was first published in the October 1973 issue of Cavalier magazine. In 1978, it was collected in King's first book of short stories, Night Shift (King had wanted to cut the story in favor of his 1972 story "Suffer the Little Children", but deferred to editor Bill Thompson who chose to keep "Gray Matter" in the collection). In 1980, "Gray Matter" was included in the anthology Tales of the Dead edited by Bill Pronzini. In 1981, it was included in the anthology The Arbor House Necropolis, also edited by Bill Pronzini.

== Reception ==
Stephen Spignesi describes "Gray Matter" as "an archetypal horror story in the sense that it uses the tropes and narratives of classic horror". George Beahm describes "Gray Matter" as an "odd little story [that] recalls 'The Lonesome Death of Jordy Verrill'."

== Adaptations ==
The first episode of the 2019 Shudder anthology streaming television series Creepshow is based on "Gray Matter" and stars Jesse C. Boyd, Christopher Nathan, Adrienne Barbeau, Giancarlo Esposito, and Tobin Bell. The adaptation has numerous differences, the main one being the decrease in cast as well as the setting being changed to a hurricane instead of a snowstorm. Instead of an ambiguous ending, it ends with the implication that the gray matter will spread across the world in a matter of days.

== See also ==
- Stephen King short fiction bibliography
