= The Last Rung on the Ladder =

Short story by Stephen King

- Short story by Stephen King
- Country: United States
- Language: English
- Genre: Tragedy short story

Publication
- Published in: Night Shift
- Publisher: Doubleday
- Media type: Print (Paperback)
- Publication date: 1978

"The Last Rung on the Ladder" is a short story by Stephen King, first published in King's 1978 collection Night Shift.

== Plot summary ==
Larry discovers that his estranged sister, Kitty, has died by suicide. He recounts a fateful day, when the two were children playing in their family's barn in rural Nebraska.

With their parents not home, they play a forbidden game, taking turns climbing to the top of a ladder in their barn and leaping from a crossbeam seventy feet (21 metres) in the air down into a haystack. The ladder is old and unsafe, but that is part of the thrill. On his last turn, Larry realizes that the ladder is on the point of letting go. By the time he lands in the hay, Kitty is already climbing up again. The ladder breaks, leaving her clinging to the last rung. Larry piles hay below her. When Kitty cannot hang on any longer, he tells her to let go, and she does. The hay breaks Kitty's fall and saves her life, leaving her with only a broken ankle. Larry is astonished when Kitty tells him that she hadn't looked down before letting go, so she didn't know about the hay. She had simply trusted him to save her.

Kitty grows up into a beautiful woman; she is supposed to attend business college but, in the summer after graduation, wins a beauty pageant and marries one of the judges. After the marriage fails, Kitty moves to Los Angeles and marries again, only to have this marriage fail as well and eventually end up working as a call girl. Meanwhile, Larry becomes a successful lawyer and is too preoccupied to visit the now-depressed Kitty, but maintains a written correspondence with her until she stops writing. He is now left with a newspaper article of Kitty's suicide ("Call Girl Swan Dives to her Death") and her final letter, sent two weeks before she died, which reads, "I've been thinking about it a lot lately... and what I've decided is that it would have been better for me if that last rung had broken before you could put the hay down". Larry says that this would have been enough to make him come running. Unfortunately, he had failed to inform her of his change of address, and the letter was not forwarded in time.

== Connections to other books ==
Larry relates that the farm where he and his sister grew up was in Hemingford Home, Nebraska. This is the town that Mother Abagail lives in during The Stand. It is also the town next door to Gatlin, the location of "Children of the Corn", and appears in It to introduce the adult Ben Hanscom. It is mentioned in Cell. "1922" from Full Dark, No Stars also takes place in Hemingford Home.

== See also ==
- Stephen King short fiction bibliography
