= The Moving Finger (short story) =

- Short story by Stephen King
- Country: United States
- Language: English
- Genre: Horror

Publication
- Published in: The Magazine of Fantasy & Science Fiction (1st release), Nightmares & Dreamscapes
- Publication type: Magazine
- Media type: Print
- Publication date: 1990

"The Moving Finger" is a horror short story by American writer Stephen King. It was first published in December 1990 in The Magazine of Fantasy & Science Fiction, and three years later in 1993 was included in King's collection Nightmares & Dreamscapes.

== Plot summary ==
A very ordinary man named Howard Mitla, who has a strange aptitude for Jeopardy!, is confronted by the bizarre sight of a human finger poking its way out of the drain in his apartment's bathroom sink. He tries to deny the reality of what is happening, but the solitary digit eventually proves to be infinitely long and multijointed, capable of attacking him, and smart enough to hide whenever his wife, Violet, goes to the bathroom. Eventually, while Violet is at work, Howard burns it with a bottle of heavy-duty drain cleaner, then chops it to bits with a pair of electric hedge trimmers before dropping the pieces in the toilet. After this is done, Howard starts thinking about the creature and the hand to which it was attached. As he realizes it probably has multiple digits and that there are several openings in an average bathroom, an ominous sound is heard from the toilet.

Investigating reports of noise coming from Howard's apartment, a police officer arrives to find him lying in a daze next to the toilet in a bathroom covered with blood. The officer asks where the body is and he cryptically tells him, "If you have to go to the bathroom, I definitely suggest you hold it." Just then, the toilet lid starts to shake from the inside. Howard, in a shocked daze, laughs and asks, "Final Jeopardy. How much do you wish to wager?" The story ends with the officer deciding to lift the lid to "wager it all".

== Adaptation ==
This story was adapted into the 1991 series finale of the TV series Monsters. It starred Tom Noonan.

Gilbert Cruz ranked The Moving Finger at number twenty-four out of twenty-seven in a list of King television adaptations. Cruz said that the internal monologue of King's characters does not translate well to television.

The audiobook of this story is read by composer Eve Beglarian.

== See also ==
- Stephen King short fiction bibliography
