= Frank Darabont =

American filmmaker (born 1959)

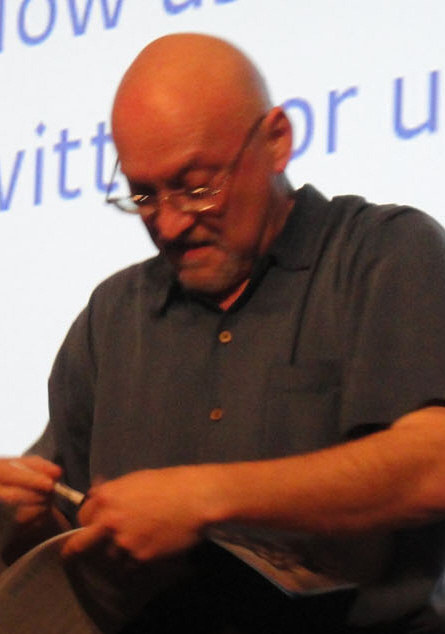
- Darabont at the 2011 PaleyFest
- Born: Ferenc Árpád Darabont; January 28, 1959 (age 67); Montbéliard, France
- Other names: Frank A. Darabont; Ardeth Bey
- Education: Hollywood High School
- Occupations: Screenwriter; director; producer
- Years active: 1981–present
- Spouse: Sara Rae Darabont

Frank Árpád Darabont (born Ferenc Árpád Darabont, January 28, 1959) is an American screenwriter, director, and producer. He has been nominated for three Academy Awards and a Golden Globe Award.

In his early career, he was primarily a screenwriter for horror films such as A Nightmare on Elm Street 3: Dream Warriors (1987), The Blob (1988), and The Fly II (1989).

As a director, he is known for his film adaptations of Stephen King novellas and novels, such as The Shawshank Redemption (1994), The Green Mile (1999), and The Mist (2007).

Darabont also developed and executive-produced the first season and first half of the second season of the AMC horror drama series The Walking Dead (2010–2011). He directed two episodes of the fifth and final season of the Netflix science fiction horror drama series Stranger Things (2025).

== Early life and education ==
Darabont was born in a refugee camp in 1959 in Montbéliard, France, to Hungarian parents who had fled Hungary for France after the 1956 Hungarian Revolution, bringing his five brothers and four sisters, and three cousins. When Darabont was still an infant, his family immigrated to the United States, settling in Chicago before moving to Los Angeles when Darabont was five.

Darabont was inspired in his youth to pursue a career in film after seeing the George Lucas film THX 1138. Darabont graduated from Hollywood High School in 1977 and did not attend college.

His first job after finishing school was working at the famed Grauman's Egyptian Theatre in Hollywood. He served at the concession stand and as an usher, and was grateful for the perk of getting to watch numerous films for free. He claims he developed his writing skills from "endless hours" of writing at a desk on a typewriter in his free time, and from his childhood friend Cody Hills.

== Career ==
=== Early works ===
Darabont became involved in filmmaking by becoming a production assistant on such films as Hell Night, The Seduction, and Trancers. The first film he wrote and directed was a short work adapted from Stephen King's story "The Woman in the Room". This film was one of the first "Dollar Babies" and made the semi-finalist list for Academy Award consideration in 1983. Although Darabont was not happy with how the short turned out, this effort resulted in a close association with King, who granted him the "handshake deal" rights to another of his shorter works, Rita Hayworth and Shawshank Redemption from the collection Different Seasons.

Darabont sold his first screenplay titled Black Cat Run in 1986, but it was not produced for more than a decade, as a television film under the same name. Darabont was approached by Chuck Russell (who was a producer on Hell Night and The Seduction) with an offer to become his writing partner, as he had become interested in Darabont's writing after reading his spec script written for the television series M*A*S*H.

The two began working on a script for a remake of the film The Blob, which they had planned to shop around to studios. That was interrupted when they were both hired to rewrite the script of A Nightmare on Elm Street 3: Dream Warriors, with Russell directing the film. The two were given only two weeks to rewrite the script and accomplished it in ten days. The success of their A Nightmare on Elm Street film allowed them to produce the first script they had originally written, The Blob. By then considered a successful writer for hire, Darabont was commissioned to write The Fly II, an early draft of The Rocketeer, and an unproduced sequel to Commando.

Darabont made his directorial debut with Buried Alive, a television movie with a $2,000,000 budget that aired on the USA Network in 1990. He followed this with an extended run as a writer for George Lucas's television series The Young Indiana Jones Chronicles. He also wrote two episodes of the television series Tales from the Crypt.

=== The Shawshank Redemption (1994) ===
Darabont made good on the deal with Stephen King by writing and directing the film adaptation of The Shawshank Redemption. Rob Reiner, who had previously adapted another King novella, The Body, into the movie Stand by Me, offered Darabont $2.5 million in an attempt to write and direct Shawshank. He planned to cast Tom Cruise in the part of Andy and Harrison Ford as Red. Darabont seriously considered and liked Reiner's vision, but he ultimately decided it was his "chance to do something really great" by directing the film himself.

Although the film did not fare well at the box office, it was met with acclaim by audiences and critics. The film was nominated for seven Academy Awards, including Best Picture and Best Adapted Screenplay for Darabont. The film attracted additional viewers after its Academy Award nominations, and became the most rented film of 1995. Today it is considered by many to be one of the greatest films ever made.

=== The Green Mile (1999) ===
Darabont's next directorial effort was another Stephen King adaptation for which he wrote the screenplay, The Green Mile, starring Tom Hanks. At first Darabont was reluctant to adapt the novel as a film, as its setting was too similar to Shawshank, but quickly changed his mind after reading the novel. Hanks and Darabont first met at an Academy Award luncheon in 1994, and the two were eager to work on a project together. Stephen King said he had envisioned Hanks in the role and was happy when Darabont mentioned his name.

The film was nominated for the Oscar for Best Picture, and Darabont was nominated for his second Academy Award for Best Adapted Screenplay. This was originally the highest-grossing film based on a Stephen King novel, as it made a total of $286,801,374 worldwide (before being surpassed by 2017's It when it made $603 million worldwide).

=== The Majestic (2001) ===
In 2001 Darabont directed the film The Majestic, starring Jim Carrey, Martin Landau, and Laurie Holden. He worked with these actors frequently throughout his career. Michael Sloane, whom Darabont had known since high school, wrote the script. This film is one of the few which Darabont directed, but did not write the screenplay. Darabont wanted to direct the film as he saw it as a "love letter" to works of Frank Capra and all the other movies he has loved throughout his life. The film received mixed reviews from critics and bombed at the box-office, recouping only half of its $72 million budget internationally.

=== The Mist (2007) ===
Darabont had originally wanted to direct The Mist even before he directed The Shawshank Redemption, but kept pushing it back. It was 2004 before he began to write the screenplay for the film. Most of the crew that worked on the film had worked on the television series The Shield, as Darabont hired them after directing an episode of the series. He thought they could help give the film a "more fluid, ragged documentary kind of direction".

Darabont also helped create the designs of the creatures in the film, along with artists Jordu Schell, Bernie Wrightson, and the film's lead makeup artist Greg Nicotero. CafeFX was hired to do the film's special effects after Darabont asked fellow director Guillermo del Toro who did the effects on his film Pan's Labyrinth.

The film was a modest success at the box office, but earned positive reviews from critics. King also praised Darabont's new ending, saying, "The ending is such a jolt—wham! It's frightening. But people who go to see a horror movie don't necessarily want to be sent out with a Pollyanna ending." When a two-disc edition of the DVD was released, it included an exclusive black-and-white presentation of the film, the way Darabont had always intended it to be.

=== The Walking Dead (2010–2011) ===
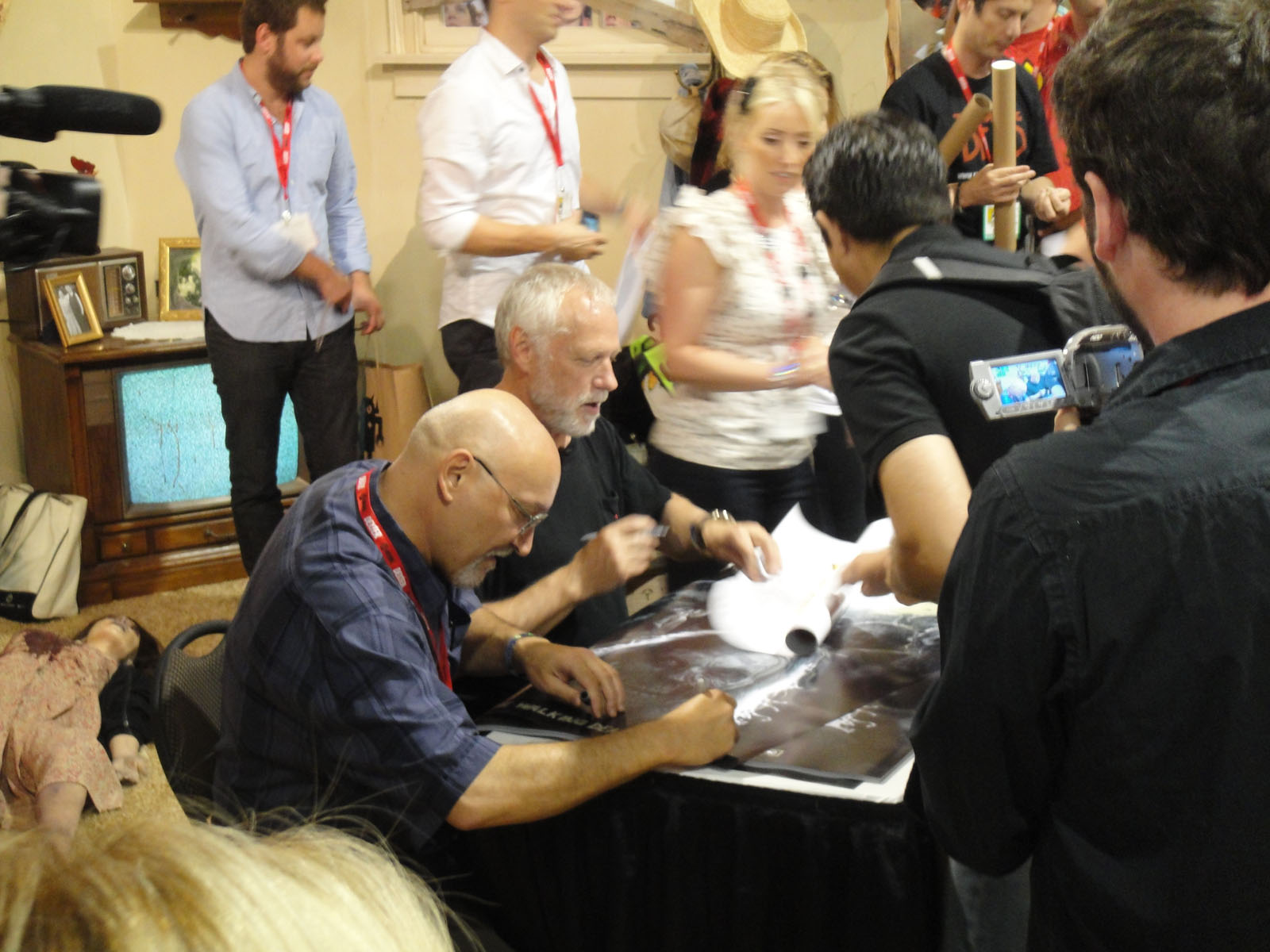
Frank Darabont and Drew Struzan signing a Limited Edition poster of 2010 series Walking Dead

Darabont developed and executive-produced the first season of The Walking Dead, the AMC series based on Robert Kirkman's comic book of the same name. Darabont recalled that he had first come across the series in 2005, in a comic book store in Burbank, California. When Darabont became interested, creator Kirkman called it "extremely flattering". He said that Darabont "definitely cares about the original source material, and you can tell that in the way he's adapting it."

Darabont first initiated a deal with NBC for The Walking Dead, but was later declined. He eventually brought it to AMC, who picked it up based on the source material and Darabont's involvement. Darabont wrote and directed the pilot and was executive producer of the first season, along with Gale Anne Hurd. The series features a number of actors who have regularly worked with Darabont in the past, including Jeffrey DeMunn, Laurie Holden and Melissa McBride. The series earned positive reviews upon release and the pilot attracted 5.3 million viewers, making it the most-watched series premiere episode of any AMC television series.

In July 2011, Darabont was fired from the position as showrunner. Initial reports suggested that he was unable to adjust to the schedule of running a television series; however, it was later confirmed that he was fired due to AMC's desire to reduce the show's budget (twice as many episodes for 20% less of a budget) and to his strained relationship with the executives of AMC. In 2016 Darabont and his agents from the Creative Artists Agency filed a lawsuit against AMC, seeking more than $280 million in unpaid profits. By July 2021, AMC had settled with Darabont and the CAA, agreeing to pay $200 million and future royalty payments.

=== Mob City (2013) ===
Not too long after leaving The Walking Dead, Darabont struck a deal with TNT to develop a pilot for a new series to air on their channel, titled L.A. Noir, based on a book by author John Buntin. Darabont discovered the book at LAX Airport and, after two days straight of reading it, decided to adapt it for television. Darabont was very passionate about the project as he had always wanted to produce a film noir.

Darabont cast Jon Bernthal, whom he had worked with on The Walking Dead, in the lead role for the series. Other Darabont regulars cast included Jeffrey DeMunn and Alexa Davalos. The series was given a full season order of six episodes in the fall of 2012 and the title of the series was changed to Mob City. The series premiered in December 2013 and was met with mixed to positive reviews. The series was cancelled after one season.

=== Other work ===
The same year The Shawshank Redemption was released, Mary Shelley's Frankenstein, which Darabont wrote, was also released. The film was met with mixed reviews and Darabont called it the worst experience in his career as a writer as he had considered it the best script he had ever written, but that director Kenneth Branagh ruined it "every step of the way". He went on to say that "you can't really judge the script based on what you saw on the screen. It got rephrased and messed with every inch of the way." Guillermo del Toro initially showed interest in adapting Darabont's draft of the Frankenstein script, calling it a "near perfect" adaptation of the original book. However, Darabont was not ultimately involved in del Toro's adaptation released on Netflix in 2025.

Darabont was a script doctor for the Steven Spielberg films Saving Private Ryan and Minority Report. He also produced the 2002 film The Salton Sea, starring Val Kilmer and Vincent D'Onofrio. In 2004, Darabont wrote the introduction for the Hellboy novel, Hellboy: Odder Jobs by Christopher Golden. In 2005, Cemetery Dance Publications published Darabont's novella Walpuski's Typewriter in a limited edition. The story, originally written in his early twenties, first appeared in Jessie Horsting's magazine Midnight Graffiti.

In 2007, Darabont directed an episode of The Shield titled "Chasing Ghosts". He also directed and executive produced the pilot episode of Raines, starring Jeff Goldblum. Darabont appeared in "First Class Jerk", the October 26, 2008, episode of Entourage in which he propositions Vincent Chase to star in a TV show he is executive producing. He appeared in a September 12, 2009, episode where he is now the director of the film about Enzo Ferrari, who Vince is portraying. In 2013, he lent his voice to a lengthier version of the World War Z audio book.

Darabont was hired to rewrite the script for the 2014 Godzilla reboot. Darabont stated that he would like to bring the monster back to his origins as a "terrifying force of nature." The director of the film Gareth Edwards stated in an interview that Darabont wrote the most moving scene of the film and that particular scene helped convince cast members Bryan Cranston and Juliette Binoche to sign onto the film.

In 2024, it was announced that Darabont was set to direct the third and fifth episodes of the fifth and final season of the popular Netflix series Stranger Things, marking his comeback as a director 11 years after Mob City.

=== Unproduced projects ===
Darabont held the rights to two other Stephen King stories, The Long Walk and The Monkey. Over the years Darabont has reunited with his old writing partner Chuck Russell. He did a rewrite for Russell's film Eraser, they attempted to adapt a film of the 1930s pulp character, Doc Savage, and the two wrote an early treatment and were executive producers on the film Collateral. Darabont has also tried to produce film adaptations of the novels Mine by Robert R. McCammon and Fahrenheit 451 by Ray Bradbury. Darabont still hopes to make both films someday.

In 2002, Darabont wrote an early draft of Indiana Jones and the Kingdom of the Crystal Skull. While Spielberg reportedly loved it, George Lucas rejected it. In 2004, he was hired by Tom Cruise to write Mission: Impossible III, but the script was later rewritten by J. J. Abrams, who directed the film. Darabont was slated to direct the 2009 film Law Abiding Citizen, but left production due to creative differences with the producers.

According to the Battlestar Galactica: The Official Companion series by Titan Books, Darabont—a huge fan of the re-imagined series—was slated to direct "Islanded in a Stream of Stars", the penultimate episode of the show's final season. Due to scheduling conflicts, he was unable to take the job, which fell to series star (and previous helmer) Edward James Olmos.

At the 2012 Austin Film Festival, Darabont was awarded the Extraordinary Contribution to Filmmaking Award for his contribution to cinema.

In November 2013, Bob Weinstein revealed that he and Darabont were developing a ten part television series based on Darabont's 2007 film The Mist. In June 2014, it was reported that Darabont was on the shortlist to direct The Huntsman: Winter's War, a sequel to the fantasy film Snow White and the Huntsman. A month later it was confirmed that Darabont would direct the film, but it would not be a sequel, but a prequel focusing on Chris Hemsworth's character Eric, the Huntsman. However, Darabont left the project in January 2015, citing creative differences as the cause.

Darabont revealed in a 2021 interview with Mick Garris that he had recently written a script for a film centred around the American Civil War, based on an unproduced screenplay by filmmaker Stanley Kubrick and historian Shelby Foote that Ridley Scott was attached to produce. Darabont considers the script to be the best thing he has ever written and was dismayed when the film was unable to find financing.

== Filmography ==
=== Film ===
Year	Title	Director	Writer	Producer	Notes
1983	The Woman in the Room	Yes	Yes	No	Short film
1987	A Nightmare on Elm Street 3: Dream Warriors	No	Yes	No	
1988	The Blob	No	Yes	No	
1989	The Fly II	No	Yes	No	
1994	The Shawshank Redemption	Yes	Yes	No	Nominated- Academy Award for Best Adapted Screenplay
1994	Mary Shelley's Frankenstein	No	Yes	No	
1999	The Green Mile	Yes	Yes	Yes	Nominated- Academy Award for Best Picture; Nominated- Academy Award for Best Adapted Screenplay
2001	The Majestic	Yes	No	Yes	
2002	The Salton Sea	No	No	Yes	
2007	The Mist	Yes	Yes	Yes	

Uncredited writing works

Year	Title	Notes
1996	The Fan	Script doctor
1996	Eraser	Script doctor
1998	Saving Private Ryan	Script doctor
2004	Collateral	Also executive producer
2006	Mission: Impossible III	Early draft
2008	Indiana Jones and the Kingdom of the Crystal Skull	Early draft
2009	Law Abiding Citizen	
2014	Godzilla	Script doctor
2016	The Huntsman: Winter's War	

Technical credits

Year	Title	Notes
1981	Hell Night	Production assistant
1982	The Seduction	Transportation captain
1984	Crimes of Passion	Set dresser
1984	Trancers	Art department assistant

Cameos

Year	Title	Role
1998	Vampires	The Man with Buick
2005	King Kong	Gunner #3

=== Television ===
Year	Title	Director	Writer	Producer	Creator	Notes
1990	Buried Alive	Yes	No	No	No	Television film
1990–1992	Tales from the Crypt	No	Yes	No	No	Episodes: "The Ventriloquist's Dummy" and "Showdown"
1992	Two-Fisted Tales	No	Yes	No	No	Television film (segment: "Showdown")
1992–1996	The Young Indiana Jones Chronicles	No	Yes	No	No	6 episodes
1998	Black Cat Run	No	Yes	Executive	No	Television film
2007	Raines	Yes	No	Yes	No	Episode: "Pilot"
2007	The Shield	Yes	No	No	No	Episode: "Chasing Ghosts"
2010–2011	The Walking Dead	Yes	Yes	Executive	Developer	Directed and wrote episode: "Days Gone Bye"; Wrote 5 episodes Also credited as Ardeth Bey
2013	Mob City	Yes	Yes	Executive	Yes	Directed and wrote 3 episodes Directed episode: "Red Light"
2025	Stranger Things	Yes	No	No	No	Episodes: "Chapter Three: The Turnbow Trap" and "Chapter Five: Shock Jock"

Cameos

Year	Title	Role	Notes
1997	The Shining	Ghosts	TV Miniseries
2008–2009	Entourage	Himself	Episodes: "First Class Jerk", "Security Briefs"

== Additional awards and nominations ==
Year	Title	Awards and nominations
1990–1992	Tales from the Crypt	Nominated- Writers Guild of America Award for Television (for "The Ventriloquist's Dummy")
1994	The Shawshank Redemption	Hochi Film Award for Best Foreign Language Film; Humanitas Prize for Best Film; USC Scripter Award (shared with Stephen King); Nominated- Directors Guild of America Award for Outstanding Directing; Nominated- Writers Guild of America Award for Best Adapted Screenplay; Nominated- Saturn Award for Best Action or Adventure Film; Nominated- Saturn Award for Best Writing
1994	Mary Shelley's Frankenstein	Nominated- Saturn Award for Best Writing (shared with Steph Lady)
1999	The Green Mile	Saturn Award for Best Action or Adventure Film; Broadcast Film Critics Association Award for Best Adapted Screenplay; Nominated- Saturn Award for Best Director; Nominated- Bram Stoker Award for Best Screenplay; Nominated- Directors Guild of America Award for Outstanding Directing; Nominated- Online Film Critics Society Award for Best Adapted Screenplay; Nominated- Nebula Award for Best Script; Nominated- USC Scripter Award (shared with Stephen King)
2007	The Mist	Saturn Award for Best DVD Special Edition Release; Nominated- Saturn Award for Best Director; Nominated- Saturn Award for Best Horror Film; Nominated- Empire Award for Best Horror
2010–2011	The Walking Dead	American Film Institute Award for TV Programme of the Year; Nominated- Directors Guild of America Award for Outstanding Directing; Nominated- Writers Guild of America Award for New Series

Directed Academy Award performances
Under Darabont's direction, these actors have received Academy Award nominations for their performances in their respective roles.

Year	Performer	Film	Result
Academy Award for Best Actor
1994	Morgan Freeman	The Shawshank Redemption	Nominated
Academy Award for Best Supporting Actor
1999	Michael Clarke Duncan	The Green Mile	Nominated

== See also ==
- List of Hungarian Academy Award winners and nominees
