= One for the Road (short story) =

1977 short story by Stephen King

- Short story by Stephen King
- Country: United States
- Language: English
- Genre: Horror short story

Publication
- Published in: Maine
- Media type: Print (magazine)
- Publication date: March/April 1977

Chronology
'Salem's Lot	—

"One for the Road" is a short story by Stephen King, acting as a sequel to his second novel, Salem’s Lot. It was first published in the March/April 1977 issue of Maine, and later collected in King's 1978 collection Night Shift.

== Plot summary ==
Two years after the events of 'Salem's Lot, vampires still prowl the burned-out remains of Jerusalem's Lot, Maine, and its environs. Residents of nearby towns, including the narrator Booth, live in unspoken fear, wearing religious symbols for protection and never venturing near the area after dark.

One night, Booth and his friend, bar owner Herb "Tookey" Tooklander, attempt to rescue the wife and daughter of a motorist named Gerard Lumley, whose vehicle is stranded in a ferocious blizzard. Initially contemptuous of Lumley for driving in such weather, both are horrified upon realizing that his vehicle is stranded in Jerusalem's Lot. They reluctantly drive out in an International Scout with Lumley to try to save his family, fearing the worst.

The three locate Lumley's Mercedes, still running and heated but nonetheless abandoned. Realizing what has likely happened to Lumley's family, Tookey and Booth try to get him to leave with them to find the sheriff, but Lumley refuses and stumbles around in the snow, calling for his wife and daughter. Lumley's wife emerges from the dark and he hurries toward her; he notices her fanged teeth and red eyes too late and is bitten. Booth nearly falls victim to Lumley's daughter, but Tookey throws a Douay Bible at her as both men scramble into the Scout, quickly fleeing the area.

Booth concludes the story by saying Tookey died of a heart attack a couple of years after the incident. He mentions that he still has nightmares about that night and about Lumley's daughter, and warns the reader that if they are in the area, to never go up the road into Jerusalem's Lot for any reason, especially at night, lest the reader encounter Lumley's daughter, "still waiting for her goodnight kiss".

== Connection to King's other works ==
This story acts as a sequel to King's 1975 novel 'Salem's Lot, and is also connected to the story of "Jerusalem's Lot", which is a prequel to both, while also appearing in Night Shift. Both stories were later collected in the 2005 'Salem's Lot Illustrated Edition.

== See also ==
- 'Salem's Lot
- Stephen King short fiction bibliography
