= Billy Summers =

2021 crime novel by Stephen King

- First edition cover
- Author: Stephen King
- Audio read by: Paul Sparks
- Cover artist: Will Staehle
- Language: English
- Genre: Crime
- Publisher: Scribner
- Publication date: August 3, 2021
- Publication place: United States
- Media type: Print (Hardcover)
- Pages: 528
- ISBN: 978-1-982-17361-6

Billy Summers is a crime novel written by American author Stephen King, published by Scribner on August 3, 2021.

== Plot ==
Billy Summers is a former Marine sniper and hitman who only accepts jobs killing truly evil men. When he expresses a desire to retire from the life of being an assassin, Nick Majarian, a mobster for whom Billy has worked many times before, offers him one last job–one that pays $500,000 up front, and $1.5 million after it is done.

Billy's target is Joel Allen, another hitman, who was arrested for murdering a man who won a fortune from him in a poker game. Allen has claimed to have valuable information that the police want in order to make a plea bargain, and an unnamed associate of Nick wants to keep him from talking. The job requires Billy to go undercover as a resident in the small Southeastern town of Red Bluff, where an office space has been rented out for his use. Billy's cover story is that he is a writer named David Lockridge, who has been tasked by his agent to go to the office and write each day in an attempt to meet his deadline. The office has a direct view of the courthouse, where Allen will eventually be arraigned for his murder charge. Billy is meant to shoot and kill him at that time, and then disappear.

However, Billy becomes suspicious when Nick offers up a getaway plan for after the hit takes place, since typically he leaves that up to Billy to figure out. His plan involves Billy escaping in a city transit truck that will have someone waiting for him to drive away, causing Billy to suspect that Nick intends to kill him after he pulls off the hit. Instead, Billy starts to formulate his own plan, including renting out a new apartment in the suburb of Midwood under the alias Dalton Smith. As he waits for Allen's arraignment, Billy also starts writing his fake book his character is supposed to be writing. Using pseudonyms, Billy writes about his life, starting with the murder of his little sister by his mother's drunk boyfriend when he was eleven. A young Billy ended up finding a gun and killing the boyfriend. He later ended up in foster care, and then joined the Marines when he was seventeen.

Back in the present, the killing of Joel Allen goes off without a hitch. Billy evades the transit truck and gets away by disguising himself as one of the office workers in the building. He then goes to hide out in "Dalton Smith's" apartment, where he intends to lie low during the manhunt following the shooting. When Nick doesn't pay him the rest of the money he promised after the hit, Billy realizes that his suspicions were correct; he also soon learns that there is a $6 million bounty on his head.

While Billy is trying to keep a low profile, he sees a young woman get dumped out of a truck onto the street, drugged and half-dead. Not wanting to attract police attention to his location, he reluctantly goes out to save her. It turns out that the woman, 21-year-old Alice Maxwell, had just been raped and abandoned by a group of men. Alice recognizes Billy as the shooter, but ends up wanting to stay with him out of fear that the men who raped her might come back. Meanwhile, Billy continues writing his book, recounting his experiences in the military. He writes about an incident in Iraq where he and his comrades were sent to check out a large house, and a majority of them were killed in action there. One of the survivors, Johnny Capps, would later hook Billy up with his first job as a hitman.

When Billy decides to leave Midwood, he first goes to confront Alice's attackers. He demands that two of them apologize to her over the phone, and then sodomizes their leader with an immersion blender. After that, Billy and Alice drive to Colorado to meet with Bucky Hanson, Billy's "broker" and the only person Billy fully trusts. Infiltrating Nick's estate in Las Vegas, Billy kills or injures many of his men, including seriously injuring Nick's right-hand man, Frank Macintosh. Billy manages to extract a promise from Nick to pay him the money owed and to tell people that Billy is dead. Nick also confesses to Billy that the person who ordered the hit of Allen (and subsequently the hit on Billy) was Roger Klerke, a wealthy media mogul, in order to bury evidence of Klerke's pedophilia.

Billy and Alice stay at Bucky's place, where their relationship grows. Billy finishes writing his book to bring it all the way up to the present. Meanwhile, he learns that Frank survived his assault, but suffers from seizures caused by the injury inflicted by Billy. When it is finally time to deal with Roger, Alice takes photos of herself dressed up as a teenager to entice Klerke into a meeting. Klerke takes the bait, and Alice and Billy show up at his estate, where Alice kills Klerke. During their escape, Frank's mother Marge appears and shoots Billy for revenge. Billy is wounded, and when he and Alice get back to their hotel, he tells her that she's better off not being involved in his lifestyle. He leaves with the hopes of becoming a full-time writer, and maybe even being able to atone for his past misdeeds.

Then, in the final chapter, it is revealed that the last part of Billy's story was in fact written by Alice as Billy died from his wounds, and Alice wrote it to convey his thoughts and to write a scenario where he survived.

== Characters ==
- William "Billy" Summers – Also known by his fake identities as David Lockridge or Dalton Smith, the main protagonist, hitman, and former U.S. Marine Corps sniper.
- Joel Allen – Former hitman, the secondary antagonist, the target of Billy Summers.
- Roger Klerke – Wealthy media mogul, first of the two main antagonists, previously employed Allen and hired Summers for the hit.
- Patrick Klerke – Son of Roger, was killed by Allen as ordered by his father.
- Nick Majarian – Middleman for Roger and Billy. The second of the two main antagonists.
- Alice Maxwell – Discovered and befriended by Billy.
- Bucky Hanson– Long-time friend of Billy.
- Ken Hoff – A businessman and owner of the building Billy works in as a writer.
- Frank – An employee of Nick, handicapped by Billy.
- Marge – Mother of Frank, also employed by Nick.

== Background ==
Stephen King first mentioned the novel in an NPR interview in April 2020, where he discussed having to change the story from taking place in 2020 to 2019 due to the COVID-19 pandemic. Later that month, in a live streamed conversation with John Grisham, King again mentioned it, saying it was a crime novel about a hired assassin.

Entertainment Weekly officially announced Billy Summers on January 28, 2021, with a release date of August 3, 2021. The announcement also included a short excerpt.

== Film adaptation ==
In February 2022, Deadline Hollywood reported that the novel would be adapted into a ten-episode limited television series with J. J. Abrams, King, Edward Zwick and Marshall Herskovitz as executive producers. In February 2023, Warner Bros. Pictures acquired the project and was developing it into a feature film, with Zwick and Herskovitz writing the script. The film will be produced by Abrams' Bad Robot and Leonardo DiCaprio's Appian Way banner.

== Reception ==
The novel debuted at number one on The New York Times fiction best-seller list for the week ending August 7, 2021.

In a rave review, John Dugdale of The Sunday Times wrote, "Disciplined but adventurous, equally good at action scenes and in-depth psychology, King shows with this novel that, at 73, he's a writer back at the top of his game." Neil McRobert of The Guardian called it King's "best book in years," praising his "own brand of muscular, heightened realism." McRobert wrote that the "odd balance with the sunlit, languorous first half" of the book succeeded "largely because King is so good at character and making us care through incidental details."
