= Survivor Type =

- Short story by Stephen King
- Country: United States
- Language: English
- Genres: Horror, short story

Publication
- Published in: Terrors (1st release), Skeleton Crew
- Publication type: Anthology
- Media type: Print (Paperback)
- Publication date: 1982 (1st release)

"Survivor Type" is a psychological horror short story by Stephen King, first published in the 1982 horror anthology Terrors, edited by Charles L. Grant, and included in King's 1985 collection Skeleton Crew. The Robinsonade follows a shipwrecked drug-trafficking surgeon who, left with only a large amount of drugs and no food or resources, resorts to self-cannibalism.

King considered the idea that came to him to be too disgusting, saying that "[it] goes a little bit too far, even for me." He consulted with a doctor, discussing how long a person could feed on his own body. Even being a famous writer, the author could not get the story published for a long time. Literary critics emphasized the author’s courage, humor and irony inherent in the work, as well as the realism of the events described, though some assessments of the plot were more restrained. King has since referred to "Survivor Type" as one of his "top five" favorite stories he has written. The story has been adapted into short film and television format multiple times.

== Plot summary ==
The story opens with the following epigraph:

"Sooner or later the question comes up in every medical student's career. How much shock-trauma can the patient stand? Different instructors answer the question, in different ways, but cut to its base level, the answer is always another question: How badly does the patient want to survive?"

"Survivor Type" is an epistolary story written as the diary of a disgraced surgeon, Richard Pine, who, while attempting to smuggle a large amount of heroin aboard a cruise ship, is forced to escape when an explosion causes the ship to sink. Pine relates growing up poor in New York City's Little Italy, attending medical school, and establishing successful practice until his illegal distribution of prescription medicines led to the loss of his license. He arranged to smuggle heroin from Vietnam to make a large amount of money, which would then be distributed for bribes that would enable him to return to practicing medicine.

Pine finds himself marooned on a tiny island in the Pacific Ocean whose exact location is completely unknown to him, with very limited supplies and no food. A self-proclaimed "survivor" type, he bitterly whiles away the time by using a logbook as his diary, detailing his rise and fall in the medical profession and his determination to survive this ordeal, get even with the people that "screwed him over", and return to prosperity.

Over time, the diary entries become more and more disjointed and raving, revealing Pine's slow mental decay and eventual insanity caused by starvation, isolation, and drug use. Determined to hold out for rescue, he goes to horrifying lengths to survive. He eats insects, kelp, and seagulls. After fracturing his ankle while attempting to signal an airplane, he amputates his own foot, then realizes he has to eat it to survive. He continues to amputate his own limbs to use as a food source, ingesting the heroin as a crude anesthetic during these operations. Although he initially keeps track of the dates (the entries begin January 26), his increasing mental instability causes him to lose perception of days passed (finally ending his entries with "Febba" and "Fe/40?"). His last few diary entries, barely comprehensible, indicate that Pine has sliced off and eaten both legs, as well as his earlobes, and drools uncontrollably as he ponders which body part to consume next. The diary entries end when he cuts off his left hand to eat it and writes that his fingers taste just like lady fingers.

== Development ==
In the Notes section of the 1985 short fiction collection Skeleton Crew, Stephen King wrote about the topic of arriving at the story's premise: "I got to thinking about cannibalism one day . . . and my muse once more evacuated its magic bowels on my head. I know how gross that sounds, but it's the best metaphor I know." King later elaborates that he was so interested in the idea that it was all he could think about for days. Hesitant to write anything down, King gained the assurance for the story after speaking with his neighbor, Ralph Drews, a retired doctor who confirmed that "a guy could subsist on himself for quite a while - like everything else which is material, the human body is just stored energy." Dr. Drews's further elaborations became the inspiration for the opening epigraph of the story.

King wrote "Survivor Type" in 1977, but he was unable to sell it for years; he stated that "not even men's magazines would consider this one". In a 2021 interview with Stephen Colbert, King stated that "Survivor Type" was his favorite story that he had written.

== Adaptations ==
- Survivor Type (2011), adapted, storyboarded, and directed by Chris Ethridge as a short film for the Buried Alive film festival.
- Survivor Type (2012), adapted and directed by Maine native Billy Hanson, starring Gideon Emery.
- Survivor Type (2013), adapted by Jeremy Jantz and directed by Kevin Fisk, starring Julia Angelo and Glenn McCumber.
- Survivor Type (2017), adapted and directed by Chase Pottinger as a short film, starring Conlan Pottinger.
- A Creepshow Animated Special (2020), featuring the voices of Kiefer Sutherland and Fayna Sanchez.

== See also ==
- Stephen King short fiction bibliography
