= Uncle Otto's Truck =

- Short story by Stephen King
- Country: United States
- Language: English
- Genres: Horror, short story

Publication
- Published in: Yankee (1st release), Skeleton Crew
- Publication type: Magazine
- Media type: Print (Periodical, Paperback)
- Publication date: 1983

"Uncle Otto's Truck" is a horror short story by Stephen King, first published in Yankee in 1983, and collected in King's 1985 collection Skeleton Crew.

== Plot summary ==
The story concerns an abandoned red Cresswell truck owned by Otto Schenck and George McCutcheon, wealthy Castle Rock businessmen in the post-depression era. After Schenck deliberately crushes McCutcheon beneath his derelict vehicle, the murderer becomes fixated on the truck. Schenck insists that the truck is not only moving on its own accord, but planning to kill him. At the same time, he becomes a social recluse, living in a house he built across from the truck itself, and generally begins to lose his sanity.

Schenck's nephew, who tells the story, finally finds him dead – the corpse has been drowned with motor oil and there is a spark plug rammed down his throat. The nephew goes on to describe how, on the day he found his uncle dead, he began to see strange happenings with the truck himself. Also, he couldn't accept his uncle's death as a suicide because there was no jug near the body with which Otto could have fed himself the oil. The nephew would dismiss what he saw as a hallucination, were it not for the derelict spark plug he took away from the corpse and kept as a reminder.

== Adaptations ==
"Uncle Otto's Truck" has been adapted by artist Glenn Chadbourne for the book The Secretary of Dreams, a collection of comics based on King's short fiction released by Cemetery Dance in December 2006.

"Uncle Otto's Truck" has also been adapted into a short film via King's "Dollar Baby" program, and was directed by Brian Johnson in 2019.

On September 20, 2019, Wreak Havoc Productions, LLC released the premiere of their adaptation of Uncle Otto's Truck as part of Stephen King's Dollar Baby Program. This version was written and directed by Dan Sellers, and starring Michael Burke as Otto Schenck and Jennie Stencel as the Narrator.

== See also ==
- Stephen King short fiction bibliography
