= The Man Who Loved Flowers =

1977 short story by Stephen King

- Short story by Stephen King
- Country: United States of America
- Language: English
- Genres: Horror, thriller short story

Publication
- Published in: Gallery Magazine (1st release), Night Shift
- Media type: Magazine (1st release)
- Publication date: August 1977

"The Man Who Loved Flowers" is a short story by Stephen King, first published in the August 1977 issue of Gallery, and later collected in King's 1978 collection Night Shift. The story revolves around a young man who buys flowers for his love interest, but he is eventually revealed to be a serial killer who went insane after his lover's supposed death.

== Plot summary ==
In New York City, during an early evening in May 1963, an unnamed man walks up 3rd Avenue. He walks past an elderly woman carrying groceries who greets him amicably as he waves back. While going down Sixty-third Street he passes by a flower store and hears a transistor radio drone about current affairs: including a woman's corpse being discovered in a river as well as a hammer murderer who has yet to be caught. Ignoring the news, he decides to buy flowers for a Norma, a woman with whom he is infatuated.

Entering the flower vendor, the old man who runs it lights up upon seeing him, same as the old woman. While talking with the young man, the vendor correctly deduces that he is buying something special for his girlfriend. The old man then offers him tea roses, stating that his girl will love him for it. One of the men by the nearby bakery jokingly offers the man his wedding ring, which he declines.

After leaving the vendor he continues up the street, while the various people he moves past also register the lovestruck look on his face. He then turns into an alley as night begins to fall. As he takes his time down the alley, he sees a woman walking his direction from the courtyard. Claiming that she is Norma, he rushes to her and catches her attention. He presents her the flowers, but she declines, stating that her name is not Norma. Before she can finish, the man then pulls out a hammer from his pocket and proceeds to bludgeon the woman to death. It is revealed that he is the serial killer loose in the city and that the real Norma has been dead for ten years. The death of the real Norma led him to go insane, leading to his murder spree that has already claimed five victims.

Once he is finished, the man remains optimistic that he will find the real Norma one day. Believing that his name is "Love", he saunters out of the alley, confident that the night will conceal the bloodstains on his coat. He passes a middle-aged couple on the street. Seeing the romance that radiates from the man, the woman turns to her partner and makes a comment about young love.

== Film adaptation ==
"The Man Who Loved Flowers" was adapted in 2015 as a short film by Bricker-Down Productions.

A music videoclip called "Literatura Rusa" by Jose Madero is based on "The Man Who Loved Flowers".

== See also ==
- Stephen King short fiction bibliography
