= Cavalier (magazine) =

US magazine

- Cavalier (September 1966)
- Categories: Men's magazine
- Frequency: Monthly
- Publisher: Fawcett Publications, later DuGent Publishing Corporation, now Cavalier Publishing
- Founded: 1952
- Country: United States
- Based in: Tampa, Florida
- Language: English

Cavalier is an American magazine launched by Fawcett Publications in 1952 and which ran for decades, eventually evolving into a Playboy-style men's magazine.

In its original format, Cavalier was planned by Fawcett to feature novelettes and novel excerpts by Fawcett's Gold Medal authors, including Richard Prather and Mickey Spillane.

== Editors ==
During the 1950s, the magazine was edited by James B. O'Connell (1952–1958) and Bob Curran (1959). Editors in the 1960s included Frederic A. Birmingham (1962), Frank M. Robinson, Robert Shea (1966), and Alan R. LeMond (1967). Maurice DeWalt was the editor in 1973.

== Contributors ==
Authors in the 1950s included Jimmy Breslin, Henry Kuttner, Clyde Beatty ("Tigers on the Loose"), and Stanley P. Friedman. During the 1960s, the magazine featured such writers as Nelson Algren, Isaac Asimov, Ray Bradbury, Robert Coover, Leonard Feather, Bruce Jay Friedman, Richard Gehman, Nat Hentoff, John Clellon Holmes, William Bradford Huie, Garson Kanin, Paul Krassner, John D. MacDonald, Alberto Moravia, Thomas Pynchon, Robert Shelton, Isaac Bashevis Singer, Theodore Sturgeon, William Tenn, and Colin Wilson. Some stories were reprints, such as Roald Dahl's "Man from the South" in the June 1960 issue.

Film critic Manny Farber had a monthly column in the 1960s. Stephen King was a contributor during the 1970s, and his stories were also featured in Cavalier Yearbook.

== Cartoonists and illustrators ==
Vaughn Bode's long-running comic-strip feature Deadbone/Deadbone Erotica/Erotica was published in Cavalier continuously from May 1969 through August 1975 (with the exception of April 1975). From September 1975 onwards, reprints of previously published Deadbone strips appeared, as Bode had died in July 1975. Other comics by Art Spiegelman, Robert Crumb, and Jay Lynch were also published at times. Illustrators included the Boston-based painter Norman Baer.

Illustrator/painter Robert McGinnis, whose long illustration career had just started to take off around the beginning of the 1960s, painted some female figures (some of them nudes) for some of the Cavalier issues, with some verified issue examples being June, October, and December 1965.

== Publishers ==
The magazine had several logo changes, and during the 1960s, it was taken over by the DuGent Publishing Corporation, which was located at 236 East 46th Street in New York City. In the 1980s, DuGent Publishing relocated their headquarters to Coral Gables, Florida.

Cavalier is currently published by Cavalier Publishing, LLC in Tampa, Florida.
