= 1922 (2017 film) =

2017 film by Zak Hilditch

- Promotional release poster
- Directed by: Zak Hilditch
- Screenplay by: Zak Hilditch
- Based on: 1922 by Stephen King
- Produced by: Ross M. Dinerstein
- Starring: Thomas Jane; Molly Parker; Dylan Schmid; Kaitlyn Bernard; Bob Frazer; Brian d'Arcy James; Neal McDonough
- Cinematography: Ben Richardson
- Edited by: Merlin Eden
- Music by: Mike Patton
- Production company: Campfire Studios
- Distributed by: Netflix
- Release dates: September 23, 2017 (Fantastic Fest); October 20, 2017 (United States)
- Running time: 101 minutes
- Country: United States
- Language: English
- Budget: $5 million

1922 is a 2017 American horror film written and directed by Zak Hilditch, based on Stephen King's 2010 novella of the same name. The story follows a man (Thomas Jane) who, conspiring with his son (Dylan Schmid), murders his wife (Molly Parker), which plagues them both with guilt. Kaitlyn Bernard, Bob Frazer, Brian d'Arcy James, and Neal McDonough also star.

1922 premiered at the 2017 Fantastic Fest, before releasing on Netflix on October 20. It received positive reviews from critics.

== Plot ==
In 1922, Wilfred "Wilf" James is a farmer living in Hemingford Home Nebraska, with his wife, Arlette James, and their 14-year-old son, Henry. Arlette inherits additional land from her father and wants the family to sell up a livestock company and move to Omaha. When Wilf objects, she plans to divorce him and take Henry with her. Wilf convinces Henry to help murder his mother, as Henry is in love with the daughter of a neighboring farmer, Shannon Cotterie, and does not wish to move. Henry reluctantly agrees.

Wilf gets Arlette drunk and Henry covers her face while Wilf cuts her throat. He dumps her body into a dry well, where her corpse is fed upon by rats. They are visited by the livestock company's lawyer who does not believe their claim that Arlette left them during the night. They drop a cow into the well to hide Arlette's body and provide a justification for filling it in. Sheriff Jones examines their house but finds no evidence of a crime.

As time passes, Henry becomes increasingly depressed and Shannon becomes pregnant with his child. Her parents decide to send her to a Catholic institution. Henry steals Wilf's car and runs away with Shannon.

As the winter progresses, Wilf sees rats everywhere and drinks heavily. The house and barn fall into a state of disrepair, and he is bitten on the hand by a rat which becomes infected. Wilf is confronted by a vision of his wife, surrounded by the rats that ate her corpse. She recounts the fate of Henry and Shannon. They became robbers, known as the "Sweetheart Bandits". During one of their heists, Shannon is shot, causing her to miscarry the baby and ultimately die. Henry lies down next to her and shoots himself.

Wilf is found by the sheriff and taken to the hospital where his hand is amputated. He is told that an unidentified woman's body has been found on the side of the road, which the sheriff assumes is Arlette. Henry's body is delivered to Wilf, which like his mother's body, has been chewed through by rats. He attempts to sell his land to Shannon's father, who tells Wilf to never come back. After selling the land to the livestock company at a low price, Wilf moves to Omaha and finds a job but cannot escape being followed by rats.

Eight years later, in 1930, Wilf writes his confession, concluding, "In the end, we all get caught." By the time he finishes, dozens of rats have swarmed his room. Arlette, Henry, and Shannon's corpses have appeared in front of Wilf. Brandishing the same butcher's knife used to kill his mother, Henry tells Wilf that his death will be quick.

== Cast ==
- Thomas Jane as Wilfred "Wilf" Leland James
- Molly Parker as Arlette Christina Winters James
- Dylan Schmid as Henry "Hank" Freeman James
- Kaitlyn Bernard as Shannon Cotterie
- Bob Frazer as Mr. Lester
- Brian d'Arcy James as Sheriff Jones
- Neal McDonough as Harlan "Harl" Cotterie

== Production ==
While working on These Final Hours (2013), director Zak Hilditch came across Full Dark, No Stars (2010), a collection of four novellas by Stephen King including Big Driver, Fair Extension, A Good Marriage, and 1922. After These Final Hours was completed, Hilditch decided to adapt 1922 into a motion picture, as he had found the story to have been "cinematic" on its own. Writing a speculative screenplay before finding out if he would be able to obtain the rights to the project, Hilditch was given six months to finish writing his script. After meeting producer Ross M. Dinerstein in Los Angeles, who sent his screenplay to Netflix, Hilditch was quickly told that his idea would become a film under the platform.

Principal photography for 1922 began in Vancouver with cinematographer Ben Richardson to take advantage of the tax credit given to films shot in Canada. Due to harvesting season, a farmhouse with a cornfield could not be found in time before filming, resulting in the corn depicted in the film being made using corn props from China, computer graphics (CG), and shots taken in Boort, Australia. A farmhouse located in the city of Langley was eventually used during the shooting of the project, with filming concluding in Boort.

== Reception ==
1922 received positive reviews. Review aggregator website Rotten Tomatoes reports an approval rating of 91% based on 44 reviews, with an average rating of 6.9/10. The site's critics' consensus reads: "Thanks to director Zak Hilditch's patient storytelling and strong work from lead Thomas Jane, 1922 ranks among the more satisfying Stephen King adaptations." Metacritic reports an aggregated score of 70 out of 100 based on 8 critics, indicating "generally favorable" reviews.

John DeFore of The Hollywood Reporter stated "[the] film is not lurid in its scares, and instead depicts its protagonist's suffering mostly as a slow rot."

Critics also lauded Thomas Jane's portrayal of Wilfred James. "The bulk of the movie's appeal, however, comes from Thomas Jane, delivering his most effective performance in ages," said Eric Kohn on Indiewire. "He plays tortured would-be lunatic Wilfred James, who lords over 80 acres of Nebraska farmland that his family has owned for generations. Within five minutes, a disheveled Wilfred establishes in voiceover that he's confessing a crime, and by ten minutes, it's clear what he's done."
