= Kaitlyn Bernard =

Canadian actress (born 2000)

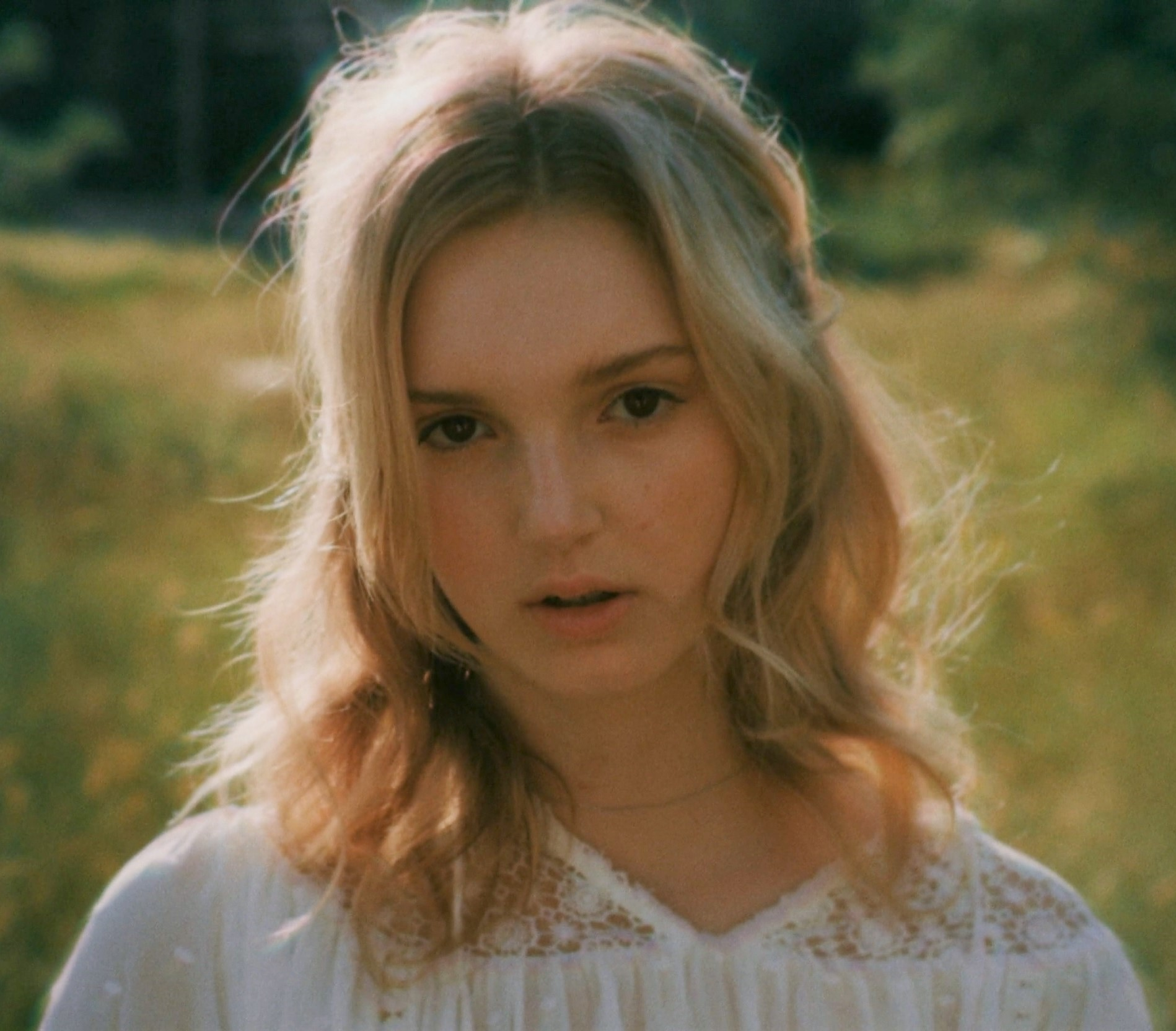
- Bernard in The Loneliest Boy in the World, 2020
- Born: November 30, 2000 (age 25); Vancouver, British Columbia, Canada
- Occupation: Actress
- Years active: 2010-present
- Notable work: 1922; Spontaneous

Kaitlyn Bernard (born November 30, 2000) is a Canadian actress best known for her roles in films such as 1922 (2017), Spontaneous (2020), and The Professor (2018).

== Biography ==
Bernard was born on November 30, 2000, in Vancouver, British Columbia. She began her acting career at the age of 12, when she appeared in episodic roles in the television shows: Haven, R.L. Stine's The Haunting Hour, When Calls the Heart, Mr. D and Everyone's Famous. Bernard starred in the 2013 miniseries Let's Make It! So Good! alongside Quinn Dubois, Olivia Knowles, Lucy Talalay and Blake Williams. In 2014, Bernard worked in the television film such as: June in January as June at 12 Years Old and Mom's Day Away as Ella Miller.

In 2015, Bernard appeared as Teenager in the comedy film No Men Beyond This Point stars Patrick Gilmore, directed by Mark Sawers. In 2016, Bernard co-starred in the comedy-drama film The Healer opposite Oliver Jackson-Cohen, Camilla Luddington, Jorge Garcia, Adrian G. Griffiths and Jonathan Pryce, which was released on September 16, 2016. On the same year, Bernard appeared as Daughter in the film Cadence, where she won the Best Principal or Supporting Actress in a Feature Film Age 13 & Over at the 2017 The Joey Awards in Vancouver.

In 2017, Bernard played the role of Shannon Cotterie in the horror drama film 1922 directed by Zak Hilditch, based on Stephen King's 2010 novella of the same name. In 2018, Bernard co-starred Jessica Lowndes, Joel Gretsch, Ellery Sprayberry and Ana Golja in the television film A Father's Nightmare. On the same year, Bernard appeared as Taylor in the comedy-drama film The Professor directed by Wayne Roberts, which was premiere at the Zurich Film Festival on October 5, 2018, and was released on May 17, 2019, by Saban Films.

In 2019, Bernard starred in the television film Homekilling Queen directed by Alexandre Carrière, where she played the lead role of Whitney Manning. In 2020, Bernard played the lead role of Grace Carver in the thriller film The Sinners directed by Courtney Paige, which was premiered at the Mammoth Film Festival on March 1, 2020, through Brainstorm Media. On the same year, Bernard appeared in the coming-of age comedy film Spontaneous as Skye, which was released on October 2, 2020.

In 2022, Bernard appeared on the first season of the comedy series The Lake, where she played the role of Keri Moore.

== Filmography ==
=== Film ===
Year	Title	Role	Notes
2012	Soon Enough	Lily	Short film
2013	Hybrids	Abigail	Short film
2013	Villain!	Cereal Girl	Short film
2015	No Men Beyond This Point	Teenager	
2016	Cadence	Daughter	
2016	The Healer	Abigail	
2017	1922	Shannon Cotterie	
2018	Disorder	Lizzie	Short film
2018	The Professor	Taylor	
2020	The Sinners	Grace Carver	
2020	Spontaneous	Skye	
2020	The Loneliest Boy In The World	Ocean	Short film
2021	Pup		Short film; director, writer

=== Television ===
Year	Title	Role	Notes
2013	Let's Make It! So Good!	Zoe	Television miniseries
2013	Haven	12 Year Old Girl	Episode: "Crush"
2014	June in January	June at 12 Years Old	Television movie
2014	Mom's Day Away	Ella Miller	Television movie
2014	R.L. Stine's The Haunting Hour	Kelsey	Episode: "My Old House"
2015	When Calls the Heart	Annabelle Conklin	Episode: "Heart and Soul"
2016	Mr. D	Victoria	Episode: "Duncan vs. Bailey"
2016	Everyone's Famous	Cindy	Episode: "Bill's Landscape and Exorcism Services"
2018	A Father's Nightmare	Lisa Carmichael	Television movie
2019	Homekilling Queen	Whitney Manning	Television movie
2022–2023	The Lake	Keri Moore	11 episodes
2024	A Novel Noel	Josie	Hallmark TV movie

== Awards and nominations ==
Year	Award	Category	Work	Result
2017	The Joey Awards	Best Principal or Supporting Actress in a Feature Film Age 13 & Over	Cadence	Won
2020	Newark International Film Festival	Best Actor	The Sinners	Won
