= A Good Marriage (disambiguation) =

A Good Marriage is a 2010 novella by Stephen King.

A Good Marriage or The Good Marriage may also refer to:

- A Good Marriage (film), a 2014 American thriller based on the novella
- Le Beau Mariage ("The Good Marriage"), a 1982 French film directed by Éric Rohmer
- The Good Marriage: How and Why Love Lasts, a 1995 nonfiction book by Judith S. Wallerstein and Sandra Blakeslee
