= The Professor (2018 film) =

2018 film directed by Wayne Roberts

- Theatrical release poster
- Directed by: Wayne Roberts
- Written by: Wayne Roberts
- Produced by: Brian Kavanaugh-Jones; Greg Shapiro; Braden Aftergood
- Starring: Johnny Depp; Rosemarie DeWitt; Danny Huston; Zoey Deutch; Ron Livingston; Odessa Young; Paloma Kwiatkowski
- Cinematography: Tim Orr
- Edited by: Sabine Emiliani
- Music by: Bryce Dessner; Aaron Dessner
- Production companies: Global Road Entertainment; Automatik Entertainment; Infinitum Nihil; Leeding Media; Starlings Entertainment; Relic Pictures
- Distributed by: Saban Films; DirecTV Cinema
- Release dates: October 5, 2018 (Zurich); May 17, 2019 (United States)
- Running time: 90 minutes
- Country: United States
- Language: English
- Box office: $3.6 million

The Professor (also known as Richard Says Goodbye) is a 2018 American comedy-drama film written and directed by Wayne Roberts. The film stars Johnny Depp as Richard Brown, a college professor who, after being diagnosed with terminal cancer, decides to live his life with reckless abandon. The supporting cast includes Rosemarie DeWitt, Danny Huston, Zoey Deutch, Ron Livingston, Odessa Young, and Paloma Kwiatkowski.

The film had its world premiere at the Zurich Film Festival on October 5, 2018, and was released in the United States on May 17, 2019, by Saban Films. Despite its notable cast, The Professor underperformed at the box office, grossing approximately $3.6 million worldwide.

== Plot ==
Richard Brown, a literature professor at a New England college, is diagnosed with stage 4 terminal lung cancer. His doctor estimates a life expectancy of six months without treatment or up to eighteen months with it. He returns home intending to inform his family, but during dinner his daughter Olivia announces that she is a lesbian. Veronica, his wife, dismisses the revelation. Veronica then discloses that she is having an affair with Henry Wright, the college dean. Richard chooses not to reveal his diagnosis.

At the university, Richard changes his teaching approach. He offers a passing grade to students who wish to leave his class, retaining only those who express genuine interest. His behavior becomes increasingly erratic, and he begins using drugs and alcohol more frequently. He and Veronica agree to maintain appearances for Olivia's sake while leading separate lives privately.

Richard informs his colleague and department chair, Peter, of his condition and requests a sabbatical. Though initially reluctant, Peter agrees to assist. Richard briefly attends a cancer support group but leaves early. He later spends time with a student, Claire, who reveals that she is the niece of Dean Wright. Richard tells her about his diagnosis.

After collapsing from intoxication and being hospitalized, Richard confronts Dean Wright regarding the affair and alleges misuse of university funds. He is subsequently granted a sabbatical. In his final class, Richard urges his students to embrace their lives and confront mortality. At a faculty dinner, he publicly announces his illness, criticizes the dean, and expresses affection toward Veronica.

At home, Olivia confides in Richard about relationship issues. He reassures her and informs her of his diagnosis. He then departs with his dog and drives beyond a fork in the road, choosing an unmarked path across an open field.

== Cast ==
- Johnny Depp as Richard Brown
- Rosemarie DeWitt as Veronica Sinclair-Brown
- Odessa Young as Olivia Brown
- Danny Huston as Peter Matthew
- Zoey Deutch as Claire
- Devon Terrell as Danny Albright
- Ron Livingston as Henry Wright
- Siobhan Fallon Hogan as Donna
- Linda Emond as Barbara Matthew
- Matreya Scarrwener as Rose
- Paloma Kwiatkowski as Student
- Kaitlyn Bernard as Taylor
- Michael Kopsa as Richard's Doctor

== Production ==
=== Development ===
On May 8, 2017, it was announced that Johnny Depp would star in Richard Says Goodbye, a comedy-drama film written and directed by Wayne Roberts. The project marked Roberts's second feature following Katie Says Goodbye (2016). IM Global was confirmed as the primary financier of the film. Brian Kavanaugh-Jones was set to produce through Automatik Entertainment, alongside IM Global's Greg Shapiro.

=== Casting ===
Zoey Deutch was announced on July 20, 2017, as one of the first additional cast members, playing a student of the protagonist. On July 25, 2017, Danny Huston, Rosemarie DeWitt, Devon Terrell, and Odessa Young were confirmed to join the cast in supporting roles. The film was co-financed by IM Global and Cirrina Studios, with further financing from Leeding Media.

=== Filming ===
Principal photography began on July 25, 2017, in Vancouver, British Columbia.

== Release ==
The Professor had its world premiere at the Zurich Film Festival on October 5, 2018. Prior to its debut, Saban Films and DirecTV Cinema acquired the distribution rights to the film. It was later released in the United States on May 17, 2019.

== Reception ==
On the review aggregator website Rotten Tomatoes, The Professor holds an approval rating of 11% based on 19 reviews, with an average rating of 4.8/10. The website's consensus reads: “A muddled story populated with thinly written characters and arranged around a misguided Johnny Depp performance, The Professor fails early and often.” On Metacritic, the film has a weighted average score of 37 out of 100, based on 12 critics, indicating “generally unfavorable reviews.”

Guy Lodge of Variety criticized the film's tone and casting, describing it as “misogynist in outlook” and suggesting that Depp was an inappropriate choice for the role, given the then-ongoing abuse allegations. Lodge compared the film's themes and moral framing to American Beauty (1999) and characterized the result as unconvincing. Ben Kenigsberg of The New York Times found the film's depiction of illness unpersuasive, calling it “tired (at best)” and noting that the narrative was “plagued with worn-out screenwriting devices,” though he conceded that it could be intermittently entertaining.

Peter Bradshaw of The Guardian wrote that Depp's performance “plays like a tribute act to peak-era Jack Nicholson” and called the film “a bizarre vanity project,” criticizing its tonal inconsistency and artificial character arcs. James Berardinelli of ReelViews described the film as “difficult to engage with,” noting that the emotional stakes felt underdeveloped and that the screenplay failed to build meaningful dramatic tension.

Nick Allen of RogerEbert.com awarded the film two out of four stars, stating that while Depp's performance showed glimpses of spontaneity, the film “never goes deep enough” into its themes to resonate meaningfully. Chuck Wilson of the Los Angeles Times described the film as “frustratingly vague” and noted that “it fails to commit to its most potentially engaging ideas.” Chuck Bowen of Slant Magazine called it “a diverting yet disingenuously virtuous time-killer,” writing that the film gestures toward profundity without ever achieving it.

John DeFore of The Hollywood Reporter found the central premise intriguing but argued that the film “never develops into a credible drama,” instead offering only a surface-level treatment of its protagonist's decline.
