= Big Driver (film) =

- Genre: Crime thriller
- Based on: Big Driver by Stephen King
- Teleplay by: Richard Christian Matheson
- Directed by: Mikael Salomon
- Starring: Maria Bello; Olympia Dukakis; Joan Jett
- Music by: Jeff Beal
- Country of origin: United States
- Original language: English

Production
- Executive producers: Bill Haber; Jeffrey M. Hayes
- Producer: Michael Mahoney
- Cinematography: Steve Cosens
- Editor: Michael Doherty
- Running time: 87 minutes
- Production company: Ostar Productions

Original release
- Network: Lifetime
- Release: October 18, 2014

Big Driver is a 2014 American crime thriller television film based on the novella of the same name by Stephen King, published in his collection Full Dark, No Stars (2010). It was directed by Mikael Salomon and written by Richard Christian Matheson.

== Plot ==
Tess Thorne, a successful crime-mystery writer, is invited to a library in upstate Massachusetts for a meet-and-greet with fans, but is scared of flying so drives to engagements even long distances away. After the event, Ramona, the organizer, suggests a quicker route home for Tess. However, it takes her via a remote rural location where her car runs over nail-studded planks lying across the road, puncturing her tire. It happens by an abandoned gas station and, having no signal for her cell phone, Tess hopes that someone will stop to help.

A man in a pickup stops and offers to assist. At first he seems eager to help, but soon turns nasty. He hits her, then brutally rapes and beats her, before choking her into unconsciousness. He drags her into a culvert and leaves her there. When she recovers the man is gone, and she finds three female bodies in the culvert, all victims (she assumes) of the same man. Tess leaves to find help, but as she walks she worries that the attack will create a scandal – she will be attacked in the media for "asking for it" and blamed. She will be re-traumatized and her reputation will be destroyed. She comes across a convenience store and calls a limousine service for a ride home. She decides that she cannot tell anyone what happened.

When Tess is safely home, she decides to avenge herself. She receives a call from Betsy, a waitress at the Stagger Inn, telling her that her car has been parked there. The pair form a bond by both being victims of violence. Tess later realizes that Ramona is her attacker's mother and accomplice, who sought her out and invited her to the library, then led her into her son's trap. That night, she goes to Ramona's house with a gun to confront her. Ramona denies all knowledge and during a struggle Ramona wrestles the gun from Tess, then reveals that she helped orchestrate the attack and pulls the trigger, firing on an empty chamber. Tess grabs a kitchen knife and stabs Ramona before shooting her. She then spots an earring that she lost during the rape attack.

In the house, Tess finds clues that identify her attacker as Lester Norville, aka Big Driver. At a nearby gas station she sees his rig, and notes the address on the truck. On the way to the address she sees the rig parked, and stops. The green pickup that he drove to the attack pulls into the lot. Fired up, Tess runs to the truck and shoots the driver as he climbs out, but then realizes he is not Big Driver, but rather his brother Little Driver. She regrets the killing, but at the urging of "Doreen" (a character from one of her books who is part of the "Knitting Club" with whom Tess often communicates) she moves forward to "finish the job."

Tess drives on to the address which turns out to be Big Driver's home. Breaking in, she finds graphic photos of his victims and photos of the brothers together with each body. There are also photos of her being raped by Big Driver. Realizing that Little Driver is not innocent, she no longer feels guilt about shooting him. Hearing noises from an outbuilding, Tess enters to find Big Driver working at a bench; confronting him, she fires twice before the gun empties and she runs outside. He painfully follows her but she hits him on the head with a nailed plank like the one that caused the flat tire. As he is trying to escape, she calmly reloads and shoots him in the groin and watches him die. Doreen appears again and urges her to leave quickly.

An anonymous tip leads police to the bodies in the culvert, and to Big Driver's house with the incriminating photos. At home shortly afterwards, Tess receives an anonymous call from a woman she realizes is Betsy, who says, "I know what you've done. Way to go, girl!"

== Cast ==
- Maria Bello as Tess Thorne
- Olympia Dukakis as Doreen
- Joan Jett as Betsy Neal
- Ann Dowd as Ramona Norville
- Will Harris as Lester "Big Driver" Norville
- Jennifer Kydd as Patsy
- Tara Nicodemo as Cop Roberts

== Production ==
Filming took place in Halifax, Nova Scotia.

== Release ==
The film aired on Lifetime on October 18, 2014. The DVD was released January 27, 2015.

== Reception ==
Rotten Tomatoes, a review aggregator, reports that 50% of ten surveyed critics gave the film a positive review; the average rating is 6/10. Metacritic rated it 56/100 based on six reviews. Brian Lowry of Variety called it "tired exploitation nonsense". Alessandra Stanley of The New York Times wrote that the humorous tone makes the film disturbing in the wrong way. Mary McNamara of the Los Angeles Times called it "a disturbingly retro and sadistically sensationalized take on the subject". Lori Rackl of the Chicago Sun-Times rated it 2/4 stars and wrote that the film starts well before "devolving into a rape revenge fantasy whose potency is diluted by silly gimmicks". Diane Werts of Newsday rated it B and wrote that it has a "solid star turn, eerie production values, even a killer ending". Matthew Gilbert of The Boston Globe wrote that it "becomes a unswerving revenge tale that's awkwardly cut with whimsical humor and reverberates with echoes of pointlessness". Pat Torfe of Bloody Disgusting rated it 3.5/5 stars and wrote, "While Big Driver doesn't reinvent the wheel when it comes to films of this nature, the strength of the script and the quality of the acting really make the film stand out." Ted Hentschke of Dread Central rated it 3.5/5 stars and wrote that enjoyment of the film depends on sympathy with its theme of empowerment.
