= We Bury the Dead =

2024 film by Zak Hilditch

- Theatrical release poster
- Directed by: Zak Hilditch
- Written by: Zak Hilditch
- Produced by: Kelvin Munro; Grant Sputore; Ross Dinerstein; Joshua Harris; Mark Fasano
- Starring: Daisy Ridley; Brenton Thwaites; Mark Coles Smith
- Cinematography: Steve Annis
- Edited by: Merlin Eden
- Music by: Clark
- Production companies: Screen Australia; Gramercy Park Media; Screenwest; The Penguin Empire; Adelaide Film Festival; Giant Leap Media; Peachtree Media Partners
- Distributed by: Umbrella Entertainment (Australia); Vertical (United States)
- Release dates: March 9, 2025 (SXSW); January 2, 2026 (United States); February 5, 2026 (Australia and New Zealand)
- Running time: 95 minutes
- Countries: Australia; United States
- Language: English
- Box office: $4 million

We Bury the Dead is a 2025 zombie horror drama film written and directed by Zak Hilditch. It stars Daisy Ridley, Mark Coles Smith, and Brenton Thwaites. The plot centers on a woman desperate to find her missing husband and follows her journey as she takes on grief and the undead in Tasmania.

We Bury the Dead had its world premiere in November at the 2024 Adelaide Film Festival. It had a theatrical release in North America on January 2, 2026, and was released in Australia and New Zealand on February 5, 2026.

== Plot ==
After the United States accidentally detonates an experimental weapon off the Eastern coast of Tasmania, the city of Hobart is destroyed, and victims on the island not caught in the immediate blast are rendered brain dead. Soon it is found that some of the brain dead are regaining motor function, becoming undead, with some of them becoming violent.

American physiotherapist Ava Newman, whose husband Mitch was on a business trip in Woodbridge, volunteers as part of an Australian military effort to retrieve and dispose of the bodies of the population. Ava is assigned to the northern part of the island, far from Woodbridge, retrieving bodies and alerting soldiers to kill any undead who wake up.

Ava is placed on a team with Clay, another volunteer, and after finding a motorcycle in a garage, the two agree to abandon their unit and drive across Tasmania to find Mitch. While resting at an abandoned petrol station, the two are attacked by an undead, but saved by a lone soldier named Riley. Riley locks Ava in a toilet and questions Clay. Ava falls asleep and reminisces about Mitch, and after hours pass, Riley wakes her up and informs her that Clay ran away.

Riley offers to take Ava to Woodbridge, but instead takes her to his house for a meal. After the two discuss their spouses who were victims of the weapon detonation, Riley requests that Ava wear his wife Katie's clothes and dance with him. Ava obliges, at this point uneasy about Riley's behaviour. They dance and fantasize about being each other's partners, but Riley realizes that Ava has not taken her wedding ring off as he requested and insists to continue the fantasy.

Ava strikes him and flees through the house. She finds Katie's pregnant undead corpse in their bed, surrounded by a shrine. Riley tells Ava that "He's alive, I felt him kick". Ava escapes out the window and runs into the shed, where she finds many chained undead, with notes from Riley researching their behavior. Riley tells Ava he believes the reason only some come back to life is that they are the ones with unfinished business. When Riley indicates he has not forgiven her for failing to wear Katie's ring, Ava kills him and uses his car to escape. As she does, she observes that Katie has awoken.

Ava makes her way to Woodbridge, and stops to rest in a camper van, removing the corpses of the family of four outside. Later that night, Ava is awakened by the corpse of the father coming to life and using a shovel to dig a grave for himself and the other three corpses. The undead driver notices Ava, but does not attack her, and continues to calmly dig the grave. Ava helps the driver bury the bodies in the grave, and the driver allows Ava to kill him with the shovel before she finishes filling the grave and leaves.

Through flashbacks, it is revealed that tensions arose in Ava and Mitch's marriage due to a failure to conceive a child, leading Ava to have an affair which Mitch discovered shortly before leaving for his business trip. Ava eventually makes it to the resort where Mitch was staying, but finds that Mitch did not awake from death and had cheated on her with a coworker before he died. Clay finds Ava at the hotel, and they bond. Ava also admits to cheating after not being able to have a child with Mitch. Clay tells Ava that his wife and daughter want nothing to do with him and that he joined up to prove to them he is not selfish. After spending the night, the two place Mitch's body in a motorboat that they set on fire as they send it out to sea.

As the two make their way back north, they encounter Katie, who has given birth. Katie turns and walks away from Ava, Clay, and the sound of the baby. Ava and Clay find her newborn in nearby stone ruins, having been born alive and entirely healthy, lacking the corpse-like features of the undead. Ava picks up the infant, crying tears of joy.

== Cast ==
- Daisy Ridley as Ava Newman
- Brenton Thwaites as Clay
- Mark Coles Smith as Riley
- Matt Whelan as Mitch
- Kym Jackson as Lt. Wilkie
- Chloe Hurst as Katie
- Deanna Cooney as Bianca
- Salme Geransar as Private Clarkson
- Holly Hargreaves as Mrs Smith
- Megan Hollier as Farm Girl
- Matthew Parkin as Truck Driver
- Amanda Faye Chandler as Dead Woman
- Charles Walmsley as BRU
- Deborah Kerr-Doorn as BRU
- Jimmy Duncan as Hipster
- John Monk as Army Personnel

== Production ==
In October 2023, it was announced that a survival thriller film titled We Bury the Dead was in development, with Zak Hilditch directing and writing, and Daisy Ridley starring in the lead role. Principal photography began on February 19, 2024, in Albany, Western Australia. Mark Coles Smith and Brenton Thwaites joined the cast of the film. In March, Kym Jackson, Matt Whelan and Deanna Cooney joined the cast, as Lt. Wilkie, Mitch and Bianca respectively.

Filming wrapped on March 26, 2024.

=== Music ===
The score was composed by British electronic musician Clark. Director Hilditch had used Clark's score for Lisey's Story (2021) as temp music during editing, and upon learning that Clark was based in Australia, invited him to score the film. Clark and Hilditch developed ideas remotely over several months before completing key parts of the score together in Perth over three days, composing to picture "the old school way". Hilditch described the result as "a sonic wall of haunted voices, electronic sounds and ominous tones". Violinist and vocalist Rakhi Singh contributed to several tracks. At two key points of high emotion the score quotes from Handel's aria Lascia ch'io pianga. The score was mixed at Trackdown Studios in Sydney and mastered at Abbey Road Studios. Variety praised Clark's "echoing score, which practically functions like a voiceover track during silent moments".

The soundtrack album was released on January 2, 2026, on Throttle Records. The film also features songs by PJ Harvey, Can, Metric, and Kid Cudi featuring Ratatat.

== Release ==
We Bury the Dead had its global premier at the 2025 South by Southwest Film & TV Festival in March. It got a limited theatrical release in North America on January 2, 2026, after Vertical's acquisition of the North American distribution rights in May 2025, and was released in Australia and New Zealand on February 5, 2026.

== Reception ==
=== Box office ===
The film grossed $3 million in its opening weekend where it played on 1,117 screens; it was the biggest opening weekend gross in Vertical Entertainment history.

=== Critical response ===
Metacritic review
breakdown (unweighted)

Positive
10 (63%)
Mixed
6 (38%)
Negative
0 (0%)

On the review aggregator website Rotten Tomatoes, 88% of 115 critics' reviews are positive, with an average rating of 6.8/10. The website's consensus reads: "Anchored by Daisy Ridley's magnetic performance and a grimly inventive premise, We Bury the Dead keenly uses familiar zombie tropes as a framework to deliver a beautifully shot, emotionally resonant meditation on loss and grief." Metacritic, which uses a weighted average, assigned the film a score of 61 out of 100, based on 16 critics, indicating "generally favorable" reviews.

In her review for IndieWire, Katie Rife wrote of We Bury the Dead: "Overall, the craft of the movie is top-notch, with compelling performances, urgent pacing, and gorgeous cinematography." Siddhant Adlakha for Variety described the film as "at its most interesting and exciting when it approaches the well-worn [zombie] subgenre with brand-new spins, resulting in haunting scenes that open a cinematic window into the darkest, most mysterious parts of the human condition. Unfortunately, it keeps swerving back toward traditional horror territory at breakneck speed, resulting in a lopsided structure." Sheila O'Malley, writing for RogerEbert.com, gave the film three out of four stars, praising the framing of zombies both as fear-inducing monsters and as tragic "once-alive" human beings who were loved by others.

Meagan Navarro, Head Critic of Bloody Disgusting, a horror genre–focused multimedia company, rated We Bury the Dead 2.5/5 stars, praising the movie for "delivering a few bursts of genuine scares" and "an awe-inducing sense of scale" and its star, Ridley, for delivering "more than one standout scene that induces chills". Criticizing the director for over-relying on well-worn zombie tropes, she concluded that "Hilditch frequently opts to avoid taking any new path forward in favor of sticking with the much travelled subgenre and grief theme, leaving you frustrated by all the fresh ideas dangled but not explored."

=== Accolades ===
Award / Festival	Date of ceremony	Category	Recipient(s)	Result	Ref.
Sitges Film Festival	19 October 2025	Best Feature Film	We Bury the Dead	Nominated	
Australian Academy of Cinema and Television Arts (AACTA) Awards	6 February 2026	Best Lead Actress in Film	Daisy Ridley	Nominated	
Film Critics Circle of Australia Awards	11 February 2026	Best Actress	Daisy Ridley	Nominated	
