= Full Dark, No Stars =

2010 collection of novellas by Stephen King

- First edition cover
- Author: Stephen King
- Cover artist: Jeff Bark
- Language: English
- Genre: Horror
- Publisher: Scribner
- Publication date: November 9, 2010
- Publication place: United States
- Media type: Print (hardcover)
- Pages: 368
- ISBN: 978-1-4391-9256-6
- Preceded by: Just After Sunset
- Followed by: The Bazaar of Bad Dreams

Full Dark, No Stars, published in November 2010, is a collection of four novellas by American author Stephen King, all dealing with the theme of retribution. One of the novellas, 1922, is set in Hemingford Home, Nebraska, which is the home of Mother Abagail from King's epic novel The Stand (1978), the town the adult Ben Hanscom moves to in It (1986), where Alice and Billy stop for a while towards the end of the book Billy Summers, and the setting of the short story "The Last Rung on the Ladder" (1978). The collection won the 2011 Bram Stoker Award for Best Collection, and the 2011 British Fantasy Award for Best Collection. Also, 1922 was nominated for the 2011 British Fantasy Award for Best Novella.

== Novellas ==
- 1922
- Big Driver
- Fair Extension
- A Good Marriage

== Background information ==
The titles of the novellas and their synopses were announced on the author's official website on April 2, 2010. This is King's third collection of four novellas after Different Seasons (1982) and Four Past Midnight (1990).

== Release ==
Announced on King's official site on February 16, 2010, it was published on November 9, 2010. Cemetery Dance Publications has released several limited edition iterations of the book: a Slipcased Gift Edition, a Signed Limited Edition, and a Lettered Edition shortly after the original hardcover edition. The paperback edition released on May 24, 2011 contains an additional new short story "Under the Weather" written in 2011 (ISBN 978-1451648386), which was later collected in The Bazaar of Bad Dreams in 2015.

== Critical response ==
The Washington Post, in its review of the book, called Full Dark, No Stars "satisfyingly bleak" and "a disturbing, fascinating book." Amazon placed the book at #25 out of 100 in its "Best Books of 2010" list.

== In other media ==
Both A Good Marriage and Big Driver were adapted into films, with screenplays written by Stephen King and Richard Christian Matheson respectively. A Good Marriage was released theatrically in 2014, while Big Driver was released as a television film the same year. 1922 was adapted as a Netflix original film and released October 2017. Actor Thomas Jane portrayed the main role.
