= Brenna Llewellyn =

Canadian actress

- Born: July 9, 1994 (age 32)
- Occupation: Actress
- Years active: 2017–present
- Known for: Final Destination Bloodlines; Off Campus; Elle
- Height: 5 ft 6 in (168 cm)

Brenna Llewellyn (born July 9, 1994) is a Canadian actress. She is known for her roles as Savannah in the 2024 Tubi horror film Lowlifes and as Lexi In the Amazon MGM Studios television series Off Campus (2026). In 2025 she was cast as Val in the Warner Bros. film Final Destination Bloodlines. Llewellyn received a Leo Award nomination for Best Supporting Performance by a Female in a Motion Picture for her role as Aubrey Miller in the American drama thriller film The Sinners (2020). In 2026, she also appeared as Sara in the Amazon MGM Studios television series Elle.

== Early life ==
Brenna Llewellyn graduated from the University of Western Ontario in 2016 with a Bachelor of Science in Geology and a double minor in Geography and Writing Studies. In 2016-2017 she won the CSPG (Canadian Society of Petroleum Geologists) Student-Industry Field Trip Award (SIFT).

While in school, Llewellyn was a varsity athlete. She began wrestling around 2008 as a club member of Toronto's Team Impact. In 2009 she enrolled at St. Augustine Catholic High School, which had no wrestling team until her teacher initiated one to ensure Llewellyn's attendance at the York Regional Athletic Association (YRAA) Championships. By winning gold at YRAAs, she qualified for the OFSAA Championships, a provincial competition hosted by the second largest high school athletic association in North America. In 2011, she placed 4th at OFSAA in the 51 kg category. Llewellyn continued to wrestle competitively as a Mustang during her studies at University between 2012-2016, until graduating as an Academic All-Canadian Athlete.

== Filmography ==
Key
†	Denotes film or TV productions that have not yet been released

=== Film ===
Year	Title	Role	Notes
2020	The Sinners	Aubrey Miller	Alternate title "The Color Rose" Nominated - Leo Award for Best Supporting Performance by a Female in a Motion Picture (2020)
2024	Lowlifes	Savannah Cleary	Nominated - Best TV Movie at the Canadian Screen Awards (2025)
2025	Final Destination Bloodlines	Val	Nominated - Best Horror or Thriller Feature at The Astra Awards
2025	Pitfall	Monica	Premiered at Screamfest (2025)

=== Television ===
Year	Title	Role	Notes
2025	Tracker	Beth	Episode: "Monster"
2026	Off Campus	Lexi	Recurring
2026	Elle	Sara	Episode: “What Like It’s Hard”

=== Video game ===
Year	Title	Role	Notes
2021	North Shore Rescue - Survive Your Own Adventure	Michelle	

=== Music videos ===
Year	Title	Role	Notes
2021	Archspire - Drone Corpse Aviator	Cultist	
2023	Archspire - Bleed the Future	Lead & Monster	

=== Short Films ===
Year	Title	Role	Notes
2018	Girl in the Glactic Sun	Gemini 812	Nominated - Leo Award for Best Student Film
2019	Third Street	Ashley Q	Unofficial Recess Film
2023	When the Sky Goes Green	Jane	Nominated - CIFF Best Actress
2024	Lost in the Walls	Tiffany	Fully Improvised
2025	Purple	Her	Selected - Whistler Film Festival
2025	Soakers	Alma	Opposite Heated Rivalry's Hudson Williams
2026	Shit Circus	Yvonne	Selected - Whistler Film Festival
