= Kerri Rawson =

American writer and activist (born 1978)

- Born: Kerri Rader; June 13, 1978 (age 48); Wichita, Kansas, U.S.
- Occupations: Author; Activist
- Known for: Being the daughter of Dennis Rader
- Notable work: A Serial Killer's Daughter: My Story of Faith, Love, and Overcoming (2019); Breaking Free: Overcoming the Trauma of My Serial Killer Father (2023)
- Spouse: Darian Rawson (m. 2003; div. 2021)
- Children: 2

Kerri Rawson (born 1978) is an American author and activist for the rights of crime victims. She is the daughter of serial killer Dennis Rader, known as BTK, who committed ten murders in Kansas between 1974 and 1991.

Rawson wrote two books about her father's crimes and her life, with one of them inspiring the Netflix documentary film My Father, the BTK Killer.

== Life before Rader's arrest ==
Rawson was born in 1978 in Wichita, Kansas, to Dennis Rader, a U.S. Air Force veteran, and Paula Dietz, a Kansas native who worked as a bookkeeper. She has an older brother named Brian, who was born in 1975. By the time of Rawson's birth, Rader had murdered eight people, including two young children in 1974, when he massacred the Otero family in Wichita.

In April 1985, Rader murdered Marine Hedge, a neighbor of the Raders' home in Park City, Kansas. Rawson stated in interviews that she was six years old when she was informed of Hedge's killing, adding that she began to experience night terrors, telling her mother that there was "a bad man in the house". Rawson recalled that when the news about Hedge's murder was brought up in the family, Rader blamed Hedge's boyfriend.

While attending high school, Rawson recalled that Rader gave her his car to drive to school. After Rader's arrest, Kerri learned that he had killed his last known victim Dolores Davis, a 62-year-old native of Stella, Nebraska, who resided in Wichita in 1991, and that he had hidden Davis's body in the trunk of that car. After the murder of Davis, Rader did not kill again and disappeared from the spotlight, with Wichitans believing that he had died.

After her high school graduation, Rawson attended Kansas State University, where she obtained two degrees, one of them in education. She married a man named Darian Rawson in 2003, with Rader taking her down the aisle in the church ceremony. The Rawsons moved to Michigan to start their family there, while maintaining frequent contact with Kerri's parents. Kerri and Darian had a girl (born 2008), and a boy (born 2011).

When Rader sent a floppy disk to the Wichita Police Department in early 2005, investigators were able to track the disk's information to a local church in Wichita, whose president's name was Dennis Lynn Rader. Keeping a low-profile investigation to avoid alerting Rader, detectives took DNA samples from Kerri's medical records at Kansas State University, which eventually linked her father to the BTK serial murders.

== After Rader's arrest ==
After Rader's arrest in February 2005, Paula Dietz was granted an emergency divorce by a judge, after which she moved out of Kansas, leading a private life. Rawson's brother, Brian, whom she says suffered physical violence by Rader, has always declined requests to speak about his father. When Rader was arrested, Brian was an Eagle Scout. He served in the Navy between 2004 and 2009, working in submarines on a base in Groton, Connecticut. Rawson said that no one in Rader's family went to court hearings out of respect for the victims and their families.

Rawson began surfacing in media in the early 2010s, speaking of her journey of returning to her non-denominational Christianity (Evangelical) faith and forgiving her father. In 2016, Rawson gave an interview, accusing horror author Stephen King of "exploiting" Rader's victims and their families with his novella A Good Marriage and its film adaptation of the same name. She also said that Rader himself was a fan of King and that some of King's books might have influenced her father's actions in his latest murders.

She released her first book in 2019, titled A Serial Killer's Daughter: My Story of Faith, Love, and Overcoming, which became a New York Times best seller. In 2023, she announced another book, Breaking Free: Overcoming the Trauma of My Serial Killer Father, which Rawson intended to write while dealing with long COVID symptoms and struggling with mental health issues, including post-traumatic stress disorder, anxiety, and depression. Rawson's second book has not been published as of 2026.

Rawson received many letters from her father, to which she did not reply, including birthday cards, one describing the beauty of sunrise in Kansas, and another advising Kerri and her husband to take precautions and "be extra careful due to all my crimes", adding that "(he) would wish no harm to you but some crazy individual might try something."

In 2023, Rawson was recruited by investigators to visit her father in prison to question Rader about cold cases matching his modus operandi, including the unsolved disappearance of 16-year-old Cynthia Dawn Kinney in Osage County, Oklahoma, and other unsolved missing person cases in Kansas, Oklahoma, and Missouri. Rawson visited Rader in El Dorado Correctional Facility and tried to make him confess; she was advised by investigators to avoid direct accusations due to the risk of Rader shutting down and refusing to talk.

When questioned about cold cases and other possible crimes, Rawson said that her father asked her why she wanted to talk about that and that they have a "normal father-daughter" relationship. Rawson pushed further and asked him why her name was on a 1981 note about a bondage sexual fantasy (she was 3 years old) and if he had molested her. Rader told her that it was "just a fantasy" and that he "never touched family", adding that his daughter was seeking fame by creating stories. Rawson left deeply affected and vowed never to return, calling her father a "subhuman".

Rawson said that she keeps in touch with her mother and brother Brian, describing Brian as "bright," but expressing concern about him, saying that "[Brian] doesn't have the kids and the family that I have." She also stated that Rader had once choked him for "spoiling dinner". Brian has never publicly spoken about his father's crimes.

In 2021, Rawson reported that she was divorcing Darian, adding that she chose to be a stay-at-home mom and actively pursue activism for rights of crime victims, as well as accompany the families of other serial killers who go through similar experiences.

In January 2023, Rawson spoke to the media about Bryan Kohberger, the man who was convicted in 2025 of murdering four college students in Moscow, Idaho, in November 2022, saying that her "stomach sank" when she saw many similarities between Kohberger and her father, including the interest in criminology and criminal justice, which experts say is common among serial killers, citing further examples like Joseph James DeAngelo and Ted Bundy. Rawson believes that it is "entirely" possible that her father and Kohberger were in touch via email or phone before Kohberger's murders and that Rader influenced Kohberger, explaining that Rader had problems with prison officials at El Dorado for sending his underpants, glasses, and other memorabilia to his "fans".

Rawson appeared in the 2025 Netflix documentary film My Father, the BTK Killer and in the Gone Girls: The Long Island Serial Killer Netflix documentary chronicling the story of the Gilgo Beach serial killings and its main suspect Rex Heuermann, who pleaded guilty to eight murders on April 8, 2026. Rawson met with Heuermann's wife, daughter, and stepson during the production.
