= My Father, the BTK Killer =

- Directed by: Skye Borgman
- Produced by: Skye Borgman; Ross M. Dinerstein; Rebecca Evans; Ross Girard; Katie Hacala; Kasey Han; Will Mavronicolas; Mark McCune; Andrew Sachs; Elena Sorre
- Starring: Kerri Rawson; Dennis Rader; Richard LaMunyon; Larry Hatteberg; Andrea Rogers; Bill Hirschman; James Reed; Susan Peters; Ray Lundin; Rita Sheffield
- Cinematography: Bryan Donnell
- Edited by: Cy Christiansen; Fernanda Tornaghi
- Music by: Jimmy Stofer
- Production company: Tenderfoot TV
- Distributed by: Netflix
- Release date: October 10, 2025
- Country: United States
- Language: English

My Father, the BTK Killer is a 2025 American documentary film, directed and produced by Skye Borgman. The film follows Kerri Rawson, the daughter of the BTK Killer, and how she finds answers for questions and healing.

== Background ==
Dennis Rader is an American serial killer who murdered at least ten people in Wichita and Park City, Kansas, between 1974 and 1991. His victims, mainly women, were killed in their homes and were either suffocated or strangled to death. Rader's daughter, Kerri Rawson, struggled with shame and hatred towards her father after he was exposed and arrested in 2005.

== Synopsis ==
The film is told through Rawson's point of view of the killings of Dennis Rader. Rawson is interviewed about what life with her father was like when she was a child. The documentary shows multiple family media from when Rawson was a child, explaining how she had a normal childhood.

In 2005, two FBI agents arrive at Rawson's door. They inform her that her father has been arrested as the BTK killer. The documentary then shows the two versions of her father. To his family and neighborhood, Rader was a devoted husband and father. He used this to hide his crimes, which began before Rawson was born in 1974. Rawson shares memories of her childhood and her good connections with her father. However, she also shares memories on night terrors, bed-wetting, and a constant fear of home invasion. She now believes that it was her subconscious mind reacting to "a bad man in the house".

The arrest and media put Rawson's family into disbelief and trauma. She upends her life and forces herself to question everything she ever believed. She deals with immense grief, public scrutiny, and lasting emotional trauma, including PTSD. Over the years, Rawson struggles with a moral dilemma as she helps investigators search for more victims of her father. Rawson eventually visits her father in prison. She confronts him about his crimes and asks about other victims, but he evades her questions. She also confronts him about a disturbing fantasy he wrote in his notes that included her name, which he says that it's just a fantasy.

After spending nearly a decade in silence, Rawson is inspired by a Stephen King interview to tell her story. She tells her narrative, and becomes an advocate for victims. The documentary finishes with Rawson reflecting on her last prison visit with her father. She realizes that her own healing and identity will not be defined by his actions. The film concludes with her moving forward and closing that chapter of her life.

== Cast ==
- Kerri Rawson, the daughter of BTK
- Dennis Rader, the serial killer
- Richard LaMunyon, the former Chief of Police of Wichita
- Larry Hatteberg, a former journalist for KAKE TV Wichita
- Andrea Rogers, Kerri's childhood friend
- Bill Hirschman, a former journalist for The Wichita Eagle
- James Reed, sheriff at Osage County Sheriff's Office
- Susan Peters, a former anchor for KAKE TV Wichita
- Ray Lundin, a former agent for the Kansas Bureau of Investigation
- Rita Sheffield, Kerri's childhood friend
