= Under the Weather (short story) =

Short story by Stephen King

- Short story by Stephen King
- Country: United States
- Language: English
- Genre: Horror

Publication
- Published in: Full Dark, No Stars
- Publisher: Scribner
- Media type: Print
- Publication date: 2011

"Under the Weather" is a short story by Stephen King, originally published in the 2011 paperback edition of Full Dark, No Stars.

== Plot ==
Brad Franklin wakes up from a nightmare. His wife, Ellen, is asleep beside him in bed; she isn't feeling well after a recent bout of bronchitis. Brad takes Lady, their dog, for a walk. As he leaves the building, he learns from the doorman that exterminators are coming in the afternoon to check on a foul odor that's suspected to come from a dead rat in a neighboring apartment. After taking Lady back up to his apartment and leaving Ellen a note, Brad departs for his job at an advertising agency, leaving his wife still asleep in bed.

At work, Franklin recalls past times with his wife, both happy and not so happy: Ellen helping him on his first breakthrough ad; the couple learning that she could not conceive a child, which in a way is a blessing given the fact that she has a heart condition that could have been adversely affected by pregnancy; a trip to Nassau, Bahamas. It was on the plane ride to Nassau that Brad recalls having a bad scare, in which for a brief moment he thought his napping wife looked dead. After she awoke, and he told her about his fear, she made a joke that if she had died, he probably would have shipped her body back to New York City and married a "Bahama mama". In response, he told her that if she had really been dead, he would have used his imagination to keep her alive and simply refused to accept she was dead.

Brad receives a call from the building superintendent, who tells Brad that they now believe that the foul odor is in fact coming from his own apartment. The superintendent then makes a pointed comment about how nobody has seen Ellen in over a week. Brad surmises that the super believes he has killed his wife, and agrees to meet the super in the lobby, after which they will go up to the apartment together to check for the source of the odor.

Brad immediately leaves work and returns to his apartment building, where he uses a key previously given to him by the doorman to enter through the service entrance, thereby bypassing the lobby and super. In his apartment, he sees Lady skulking from the bedroom where his wife is presumably still asleep; the dog is licking her chops. In the bedroom, Brad finds that Ellen's hand has been chewed on by Lady, leaving only a few strips of flesh. He decides to use his imagination to deny this and tucks the hand back under the covers. He waves away a few flies, figuring that they must be attracted to whatever it is that's creating the odor. He asks Ellen if she would like something to drink or to eat. When she says nothing, he asks her if she remembers their trip to the Bahamas. When she says nothing, he asks her if she doesn't want to get up and walk around a little. Still, she says nothing. He then tells her that it's fine, that she can sleep a little while longer, and that he will sit beside her.

== See also ==
- Short fiction by Stephen King
