= The Sinners =

2020 American drama thriller film

- Film poster
- Directed by: Courtney Paige
- Produced by: Stirling Bancroft; Hanna Griffiths; Alan MacFarlane; Siena Oberman; Courtney Paige
- Starring: Kaitlyn Bernard; Brenna Llewellyn; Brenna Coates; Keilani Elizabeth Rose; Jasmine Randhawa; Carly Fawcett; Natalie Malaika
- Cinematography: Stirling Bancroft
- Edited by: Alex Safdie
- Music by: Holly Amber Church
- Production company: Globetrotter Pictures
- Distributed by: Brainstorm Media
- Release date: March 1, 2020 (Mammoth Film Festival)
- Running time: 90 minutes
- Country: Canada
- Language: English

The Sinners (alternatively titled The Color Rose) is a 2020 Canadian drama thriller film directed by Courtney Paige. The film stars Kaitlyn Bernard, Brenna Llewellyn, Brenna Coates, Keilani Elizabeth Rose, Jasmine Randhawa, Carly Fawcett, and Natalie Malaika.

It premiered at the Mammoth Film Festival on March 1, 2020, through Brainstorm Media.

== Premise ==
An A-List Girl clique starts a secret cult where each of them must embody one of the seven deadly sins. They realize there's more to their small religious town after they go missing one by one.

== Cast ==
- Kaitlyn Bernard as Grace Carver
- Brenna Llewellyn as Aubrey Miller
- Brenna Coates as Tori Davidson
- Keilani Elizabeth Rose as Katie Hamilton
- Jasmine Randhawa as Stacey Rodgers
- Carly Fawcett as Molly McIver
- Natalie Malaika as Robyn Pearce

== Production ==
The film was shot in Kelowna, Canada. Some scenes were filmed at the Father Pandosy Mission.

== Release ==
The film premiered at the Mammoth Film Festival on March 1, 2020.

=== Critical response ===
On the review aggregation website Rotten Tomatoes, The Sinners holds an approval rating of 50% based on 18 reviews, with an average rating of 4.5/10. The film also holds a B− grade from Abbie Bernstein on AssignmentX, who said that "[it is] artful but uneven small-town high school horror".

Mae Abdulbaki of Screen Rant said that "the feature film debut of director and co-writer Courtney Paige, sin and religion clumsily hold together a story with not much to say". Jeannie Blue of Cryptic Rock praised its acting, calling it "solid", but criticized it for "too many ideas that never pan out". Tori Danielle said that he "really enjoyed [The Sinners]", calling it "a unique murder mystery that [is] highly recommend[ed]".

Jennie Kermode of Eye for Film scored the film 3.5/5 and said "The Sinners plays the part so well that you'd be forgiven for thinking it was just more of the usual, but this is Courtney Paige's film, and she's taking it somewhere very different." THN's Kat Hughes positively reviewed the film, giving it 3/5, and said "A film which aesthetically and emotionally aligns with The Craft, The Sinners offers a surprising hybrid of teen slasher and crime thriller."

Stephanie Archer of the Film Inquiry said that "The Sinners is a deeply layered and nuanced film that finds as much strength in what is not discussed as in what is. Though bloated at times, viewers will be left to wonder if this speaks to the choice of medium or to budgetary restraints. And while it is definitely not the film of the year, it is certainly a strong candidate for creating open conversations and discussions and displaying a wealth of promise from writer and director Courtney Paige. Honestly, I can not wait to see what she does next".
