= Robert Beattie (writer) =

American writer (born c. 1957)

- Born: Robert M. Beattie c. 1957
- Occupations: Author; lawyer; educator
- Notable work: Nightmare in Wichita
- Political party: Democratic
- Website: robert-beattie.com

Robert M. Beattie (born c. 1957) is an American Wichita-based author, lawyer, and educator, best known for his non-fiction book Nightmare in Wichita.

== Career ==
Beattie attended Wichita West High School. Prior to writing Nightmare in Wichita, he was a writer for Teen Talk, a column in the Wichita Beacon.

=== Nightmare in Wichita ===
Nightmare in Wichita is about Dennis Rader, a serial killer in Wichita, Kansas who created the name BTK after his modus operandi, "bind, torture, kill". Rader resumed sending letters to media again after a 13-year hiatus after hearing about the book. Right before he was going to publish it, Dennis Rader was arrested and then convicted as the BTK Killer. As a result, Beattie quickly wrote an epilogue.

Beattie is also known for interviewing serial killer Charles Manson for a class project as a professor at Newman University in Wichita, which stirred controversy and brought media attention to him. Language of Evil is about a murder in Douglas County, Kansas.

Beattie ran unsuccessfully for the office of Kansas Secretary of State in 2006. He testified in front of the Kansas legislature against the reliability of polygraph examinations.

== Works ==
- Nightmare in Wichita, New American Library, 2005, ISBN 978-0-451-21738-7
- Language of Evil. Penguin Group. 2009. ISBN 978-0-451-22530-6.
