= A Good Marriage (film) =

2014 film by Peter Askin

- Promotional poster
- Directed by: Peter Askin
- Screenplay by: Stephen King
- Based on: A Good Marriage by Stephen King
- Produced by: Peter Askin; Will Battersby; Per Melita
- Starring: Joan Allen; Anthony LaPaglia; Kristen Connolly; Stephen Lang
- Cinematography: Frank G. DeMarco
- Edited by: Colleen Sharp
- Music by: Danny Bensi; Saunder Jurriaans
- Production company: Reno Productions
- Distributed by: Screen Media Films
- Release date: October 3, 2014
- Running time: 102 minutes
- Country: United States
- Language: English

A Good Marriage is a 2014 American psychological thriller film directed by Peter Askin and written by Stephen King, based on his novella of the same name, from the 2010 collection Full Dark, No Stars. It stars Joan Allen, Anthony LaPaglia, Kristen Connolly and Stephen Lang.

A Good Marriage was released in the United States on October 3, 2014 on video on demand, receiving a limited theatrical release by Screen Media Films.

== Plot ==
Bob and Darcy Anderson have been happily married for 27 years with two adult children. One evening while Bob is away on a business trip, Darcy goes into the garage to search for batteries. When rummaging through Bob's things, she comes across pornographic magazines containing sadomasochistic images. Upon looking further, she finds a secret compartment behind the garage's baseboard and inside is a small box containing ID cards of Marjorie Duvall, a victim of a serial killer known as "Beadie".

Horrified, Darcy looks up Beadie online and cross-checks Bob's business records with the locations of the murders, finding that he was close to most of the crimes. She also sees a photograph of Duvall wearing earrings identical to the ones Bob recently gave her as an anniversary gift. Meanwhile, after spotting a young woman leaving a diner, Bob follows her in his car. He then returns home to confront Darcy; he has deduced her discovery. He calmly explains his insanity to Darcy, recounting how he and a sadistic friend named Brian Delahanty, or "BD" (from which "Beadie" was derived), planned a school shooting as teenagers. However, Delahanty was hit by a car before they could carry it out, but Bob claims BD had "infected" him with "certain ideas", resulting in his homicidal urges.

Bob claims that, after he started a family with Darcy, his murderous alter ego receded, and he was not driven to kill again for several years. He asks Darcy to put the matter behind them for the sake of their children and then falls asleep. The following morning, Darcy feigns an agreement to forget what she has discovered on the condition that he does not kill again and that he bury Duvall's ID cards in the woods. Bob agrees.

A few months later, Bob, who is an avid coin collector, finds a rare 1955 doubled die cent, and he and Darcy go out to celebrate. Upon arriving home, Darcy has Bob fetch some Perrier while she waits for him upstairs, ostensibly for sex. However, when Bob goes up, Darcy pushes him back down the stairs, breaking his back and arm. She then manages to shove a plastic bag and a dish cloth down his throat, killing him. After removing all evidence of murder, Darcy manages to convince the police and the children that Bob died in a drunken accident. Darcy assumes the ordeal is over.

Not long after Bob is buried, a retired ailing detective named Holt Ramsey visits the house. Ramsey has spent years investigating the Beadie murders and had questioned Bob previously. Ramsey tells Darcy that he suspected Bob was the killer, since his Chevrolet Blazer was seen in the vicinity of each victim. Darcy realizes that Ramsey has figured out her role in Bob's death, but she rejects any accusations, and Ramsey leaves. Later that night when Ramsey is admitted to the hospital, Darcy visits him and threatens to smother him with a pillow, claiming "two can keep a secret if one of them is dead". Once she admits the truth, Ramsey assures her that she did the right thing.

Darcy returns home and enjoys life on her own, after realizing that Bob was close to being caught and therefore wasn't as smart as he thought he was. She finds that she can now be at peace with herself.

== Cast ==
- Joan Allen as Darcy Anderson
- Anthony LaPaglia as Bob Anderson
- Kristen Connolly as Petra Anderson
- Stephen Lang as Holt Ramsay
- Cara Buono as Betty Pike
- Mike O'Malley as Bill Gaines
- Theo Stockman as Donnie Anderson

== Development ==
On May 19, 2012, ScreenDaily reported that Will Battersby and Peter Askin were producing an adaptation of A Good Marriage; Askin was announced as directing Stephen King's screenplay of his own novella. On September 11, 2012, Joan Allen was announced as the lead in the film.

== Release ==
The film was released in the United States on October 3, 2014.

The film was met with a strongly negative reaction by Kerri Rawson, the daughter of BTK serial killer Dennis Rader, who allegedly inspired King to write his novella. Rawson told the Wichita Eagle that King was "exploiting (my father's) 10 victims", accusing King of making money off the serial murders and adding that her father, a fan of King's books, probably found himself motivated to perform some actions in his latest crimes, which he committed in Wichita, Kansas, between 1974 and 1991.

== Reception ==
On the review aggregator website Rotten Tomatoes, 32% of 22 critics' reviews are positive. Metacritic, which uses a weighted average, assigned the film a score of 43 out of 100, based on 8 critics, indicating "mixed or average" reviews.

Frank Scheck of The Hollywood Reporter called it "a decidedly minor" adaptation that "fails to fulfill the potential of its provocative premise". Andy Webster of The New York Times called it a "low-key, assured thriller" with a strong performance from Allen.

Gary Goldstein of the Los Angeles Times called it "a wry, old-fashioned game of cat and mouse" with good acting. Pete Vonder Haar of The Village Voice wrote that it is a serviceable, nondescript thriller that was a surprising choice to adapt to film.

Rod Pocowatchit of The Wichita Eagle rejected concerns of exploitation, but said that the film comes across as a low-budget made-for-TV film. Kiva Reardon of The A.V. Club rated it D+ and wrote, "By its conclusion, A Good Marriage doesn't give a definitive answer to its titular topic, but it does make clear what makes a bad movie."

Chuck Bowen of Slant Magazine rated it 2/4 stars and wrote, "The film is watchable in a plodding one-thing-after-another sort of way, but it could have used far more of King's mordant humor". Patrick Cooper of Bloody Disgusting rated it 1/5 stars and called it the worst King adaptation yet due to its lack of thrills. Staci Layne Wilson of Dread Central rated it 3/5 stars and questioned the choice of source material. Wilson said that the actors are good, but they have no chemistry, which makes the film stale.
