= Dennis Rader =

American serial killer (born 1945)

- Born: Dennis Lynn Rader; March 9, 1945 (age 81); Pittsburg, Kansas, U.S.
- Other names: BTK; BTK Killer; BTK Strangler
- Education: Butler County Community College (AE); Wichita State University (BS)
- Children: 2, including Kerri
- Status: Incarcerated
- Motive: Sexual sadism
- Conviction: First degree murder – 10 counts
- Penalty: 10 consecutive life sentences (minimum term of 175 years)

Details
- Span of crimes: January 15, 1974 – January 19, 1991
- Country: United States
- State: Kansas
- Killed: 10+
- Injured: 1
- Date apprehended: February 25, 2005
- Imprisoned at: El Dorado Correctional Facility
- Military career
- Allegiance: United States
- Branch: U.S. Air Force
- Service years: 1966–1970 (active); 1970–1972 (reserve)
- Rank: Staff sergeant

Dennis Lynn Rader (born March 9, 1945), also known as BTK ("bind, torture, kill"), is an American serial killer who killed at least ten people in Wichita and Park City, Kansas, between 1974 and 1991. Although he occasionally killed or attempted to kill men and children, Rader typically targeted women. His victims were often attacked in their homes and then bound, sometimes with objects from their homes, and either suffocated with a plastic bag or manually strangled with a ligature.

In a series of crimes that terrorized Wichita in the mid-to-late 1970s, Rader also initiated a series of taunting letters sent to police and media outlets, describing his crimes in detail and referring to himself as "BTK". In addition, he stole keepsakes from his female victims, including underwear, driver's licenses and personal items. In 1979, BTK suddenly went quiet, and despite an exhaustive investigation, the case grew into one of the most infamous cold cases in American history. Rader would later confess to killing three further victims between 1985 and 1991 that were not initially linked to BTK but were confirmed to be his doing through DNA and items found in his possession.

In 2004, after a thirteen-year hiatus, Rader resumed sending letters, where he hinted at committing further crimes. Based on items he mailed to law enforcement, he was identified and arrested in February 2005, pleading guilty to his crimes months later and receiving ten consecutive life sentences. Rader is currently incarcerated at the El Dorado Correctional Facility in Kansas.

== Early life ==
=== Childhood ===
Dennis Lynn Rader was born in Pittsburg, Kansas, on March 9, 1945, the oldest of four sons. His parents were Dorothea Mae Rader (née Cook), a bookkeeper; and William Elvin Rader, a former United States Marine and Kansas Gas Service worker. Rader's parents were members of the Zion Lutheran Church in Pittsburg, where Rader was baptized. Both parents worked long hours and paid little attention to their children at home, and in later years Rader said he felt neglected. Rader's father was described as strict and God-fearing, but not abusive.

Growing up in Wichita, Rader had normal interests in novels, comic books, fishing, and cub scouting. From a young age, however, he also harbored sadistic sexual fantasies about torturing "trapped and helpless" women. Rader exhibited zoosadism by torturing, killing, and hanging small animals. He acted out sexual fetishes for voyeurism, autoerotic asphyxiation and cross-dressing, often spying on female neighbors while dressed in women's clothing, including women's underwear that he had stolen. Rader also masturbated with ropes or other bindings around his arms and neck.

Whilst studying at Wichita Heights High School, Rader spent most of his out-of-school time working as a bag boy and shelf stocker for a local grocery store to earn money for a motor vehicle. After graduating in 1963, Rader attended Kansas Wesleyan University, where he received mediocre grades and dropped out after one year.

=== Early adulthood ===
Rader joined the United States Air Force in June 1966. He completed basic training and technical school in Texas before being stationed at Brookley Air Force Base in Mobile, Alabama, where he worked as an antenna installer and maintenance specialist. After being stationed for assignments in Turkey, Greece, and South Korea, Rader was transferred to Japan in January 1968, where he spent six months stationed at Kadena Air Base in Okinawa followed by twenty-five months stationed at Tachikawa Airfield in Tokyo. He earned a medal for good conduct and a ribbon for marksmanship; he also earned a National Defense Service Medal because his service coincided with the military being under a state of emergency due to the Vietnam War. Rader later credited the Air Force for teaching him about sex.

Rader received an honorable discharge on August 12, 1970, at the rank of staff sergeant. He subsequently served in the Air Force Reserve Command until June 20, 1972, around the time he was hired by the Coleman Company, an outdoor recreational equipment manufacturer. A year after his discharge, Rader purchased a home in Park City, Kansas, a suburb of Wichita. He enrolled at Butler County Community College in El Dorado, earning an associate degree in electronics engineering in 1973. He then attended Wichita State University (WSU) and graduated in 1979 with a Bachelor of Science degree, majoring in administration of justice.

Rader initially worked in the meat department of an IGA supermarket where his mother was employed as a bookkeeper. From mid-1972 to mid-1973, he worked as an assembler for Coleman, where two of his victims (Julie Otero and Kathryn Bright) also worked. From 1974 to 1988, Rader worked at the local Wichita office of ADT Security Services, where he installed security alarms. Ironically, many of his clients were concerned homeowners seeking security from his own killings as BTK. At ADT, Rader was nicknamed "blue book man" for overzealously following office rules and scolding coworkers when they failed to follow them.

=== Marriage ===
On May 22, 1971, Rader married Paula Dietz, a secretary for the American Legion, in a ceremony held at Christ Lutheran Church. They had two children, Kerri and Brian. On July 26, 2005, several months after Rader's arrest, Dietz was granted an emergency divorce, waiving the normal sixty-day waiting period. All of the crimes were committed while Rader was married, although neither Dietz nor her children suspected his involvement in the BTK killings. The family's former Park City residence was demolished in March 2007.

== BTK crimes ==
=== Murder of the Otero family ===
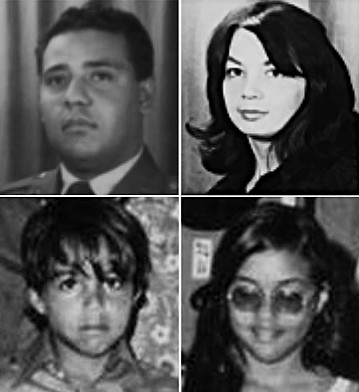
Rader's first four victims (clockwise from top left): Joseph Sr. (38), Julie (33), Josephine (11), and Joseph II Otero (9)

On January 15, 1974, Rader murdered four members of the Otero family in Wichita: Joseph Sr. (38), Julie (33), Joseph II (9) and Josephine (11). Their bodies were discovered by the family's three older children, who had been at school at the time of the killings. After his 2005 arrest, Rader claimed that he first targeted the family two months prior, when he spotted Julie leaving to take her children to school, and stalked them for two to three weeks.

On the morning of the murders, Rader parked his car and walked to the Otero residence, where he scaled a fence and cut the phone lines in the backyard. It was after this that Joey let out the family's dog through the back door, where Rader confronted him and forced his way into the home at gunpoint. Initially, the Otero family thought he was pulling a prank; Rader asserted that he wasn't and clarified that he had a .22 caliber pistol loaded with hollow-point bullets. Rader told the family that he was wanted in California before ordering them at gunpoint to lie on the living room floor. Then, he led the family into a bedroom and bound them with rope he had prepared ahead of time. Joseph and Joey were laid out on the floor, while Julie and Josie were laid out on the bed.

After being bound, the family began complaining of problems related to poor blood circulation, according to Rader. Joseph complained of a cracked rib, which he had sustained from a previous car accident, so Rader put a pillow under him. Rader later stated that it was around this time that he decided to kill them. Rader covered Joseph's head with a plastic bag, which he then secured with ropes. After Joseph chewed a hole in the bag, Rader replaced it, causing him to slowly suffocate. Rader then strangled Julie with a rope. At one point she regained consciousness and pleaded for mercy for her children, prompting Rader to kill her. Rader then placed another plastic bag, followed by two T-shirts and an additional bag, over Joey's head. Rader watched him struggle from a chair set up in the bedroom.

After he murdered the rest of the family, Rader took Josephine down to the basement, where he undressed the girl and tied a noose around a sewage pipe. Rader asked Josephine if she had a camera so he could take pictures, to which she responded no. When she asked what was going to happen to her, Rader replied: "Well, honey, you're going to be in heaven with the rest of your family." Rader proceeded to hang the girl in the basement and masturbated as he watched her struggle on the rope. Leaving the house, he got in the Otero family car and drove it to the parking lot of a Dillons grocery store. Realizing that he had dropped a knife in the backyard of the Otero home, he drove the car back to the house to retrieve it.

=== Murder of Kathryn Bright ===
Less than three months after the Otero murders, Rader selected Kathryn Bright (21) as his next victim after spotting her entering her house with a friend, referring to the planned murder of Bright as "Project Lights Out". He had no knowledge of her younger brother Kevin (19) staying over, which might have dissuaded him from targeting her, as he was trying to "stay away from the males as much as possible" to make the killings easier.

On April 4, 1974, Rader broke into Bright's house through the rear sliding glass door, finding no one was home yet. He began sweeping up the glass to try to minimize suspicion when Bright arrived. The delicate trigger of Rader's pistol caused an accidental discharge, causing him to fear that the smell of gunpowder would alert Bright. When Bright later arrived home accompanied by Kevin, Rader told them that he was a wanted man from California and needed money and a car. He forced the siblings into the southeast bedroom, where he made Kevin tie up his sister, before Rader bound Kevin himself. Rader used household supplies, including bandanas, as restraints to distinguish the crime from the Otero murders. The siblings were separated into different rooms, with Kevin's feet tied to a bedpost and Bright to a chair. Rader turned on the stereo system in the living room to drown out any sounds of struggle, which he later claimed was a trick he learned from "detective magazines".

Rader returned to the bedroom where Kevin was restrained to strangle him, but Kevin had freed himself. Rader then pulled out his firearm and a struggle ensued, during which Rader shot Kevin in the forehead. Rader then attempted to strangle Kevin again, resulting in a similar struggle in which he fired two more shots: one landing just above Kevin's mouth and the other grazing him. Kevin played dead until Rader left the room, then ran from the house. He flagged down neighbors, who took him to the hospital and called police.

When Rader reentered her room, Bright asked about the gunshots. Rader told Bright that he had shot her brother, at which point she fought back. Her resistance proved too strong for Rader to strangle her as planned, so he resorted to stabbing her "two or three times" in the area under her ribcage. Rader had heard Kevin call for help during the struggle and once he believed Kathryn was dead, Rader grabbed her keys, ran outside, and unsuccessfully tried to start her truck. When it did not start, Rader ran to his car, which was parked at the WSU campus. Bright was alive when police arrived at her house, holding a telephone, but partially verbally unresponsive. She died in emergency surgery from multiple stab wounds and strangulation. Kevin did not see his sister's body and was informed of her death several days after the attack while hospitalized.

=== Murder of Shirley Vian Relford ===
Three years later, on March 17, 1977, Rader targeted Shirley Vian Relford (26). Rader had a different victim planned for that day, but the victim was absent from home when he broke in. Frustrated, Rader decided to find a random person to kill instead. While looking for a potential victim, he came across Relford's son, Steven (5), walking home after buying soup for his sick mother. Rader approached Steven, claiming to be a detective, and asked him if he could identify individuals in a photo. He showed Steven a photo of his own wife and daughter, whom the boy mistakenly identified as his mother and sister. Rader then followed Steven back to his mother's house.

At her residence, Rader asked Relford if she could identify the same photo. During this interaction, Rader pulled a gun, claiming that he was a wanted man, and that Relford and her three children were being robbed. Rader attempted to tie up the children but struggled to do so, leading him to force the children into a bathroom, which he barricaded with Relford's coerced assistance. Rader reported giving the kids toys and supplies to keep them "comfortable" while he murdered their mother, threatening to shoot them if they broke free. After this, Rader took Relford to the rear bedroom. She vomited before being tied to her bedpost by her legs and handcuffed. Rader strangled her with rope after placing a plastic bag over her head. During the murder, Relford was sick and asked for water, which Rader provided prior to strangling her.

Rader later confessed that he intended to eventually kill the children in the bathroom. However, the family phone rang and one of the children shouted that it was someone who would be visiting shortly, causing Rader to flee the home.

=== Murder of Nancy Jo Fox ===
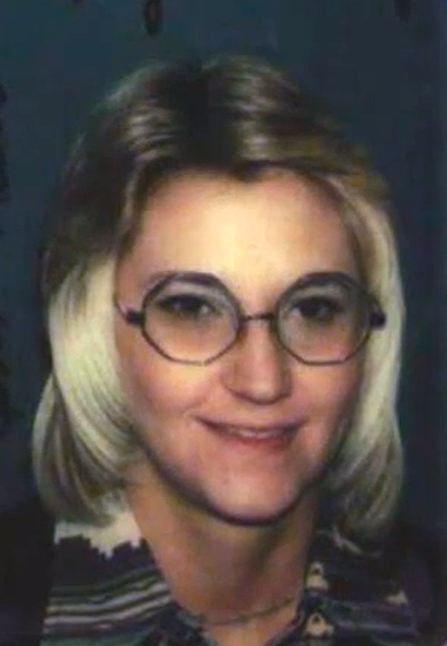
Nancy Jo Fox

Rader had been stalking Nancy Jo Fox (25) for some time before his decision to kill her; he gave her the name "Project Foxhunt".

On December 8, 1977, Rader broke into Fox's home through a back window, discovering she was out. After some time, Fox returned home from work and began screaming at Rader to leave her house, threatening to call police. Rader informed her that her phone lines were cut and she would not be able to make any calls. He then informed her that he intended to restrain her and rape her.

Rader allowed Fox to go to the bathroom after she assured him that she could not escape. He ordered her to come out of the bathroom partially undressed. Rader began to undress himself and ordered her to lie down when she emerged from the bathroom. Fox resisted when Rader tried to remove her remaining clothing. Rader then began putting handcuffs on Fox, to which she protested and questioned the need for them. Rader told her: "That's part of my deal. I got to have them or it won't work." He then began to crawl on top of Fox and wrapped his belt around her neck. He would repeatedly loosen and tighten the belt, allowing her to come close to unconsciousness and then bring her back, before eventually killing her.

=== Attempted murder of Anna Williams ===
During this time, Rader also intended to kill others, such as Anna Williams (63), who, in 1979, escaped death by returning home much later than expected. Rader explained during his confession that he became obsessed with Williams and was "absolutely livid" when she evaded him. He recalled spending hours waiting inside her home but becoming impatient and leaving when she did not return from visiting friends.

=== Communications ===
==== "I did it" (October 1974) ====
In October 1974, Rader sent a letter to The Wichita Eagle using the pseudonym "BTK," taking responsibility for the Otero murders and offering details about the crime not previously made public. He said, "I did it by myself and no ones help," referring to three brothers in psychiatric care who had falsely confessed to the Otero murders the month prior. Earlier, in July, a man in Washington, D.C. was arrested for the murders, but was cleared after a fingerprint comparison. In response to the letter, The Wichita Beacon ran a classified advertisement reading, "B.T.K Help is Available. Call 684–6321 before 10 p.m." for several of their late October issues.

==== "Nancy Fox" (December 1977) ====
On December 9, 1977, one day after he killed Fox, Rader called police from a phone booth and informed them of a murder at her address, telling them "where the victim's body could be found." The call was recorded and released to the larger public in 1979, sparking over a hundred tips, albeit none were promising.

==== "Shirleylocks, shirleylocks" (January 1978) ====
On January 31, 1978, Rader sent a letter to the classified ad department in Wichita. It contained a poem that began with "Shirleylocks, shirleylocks" followed by a detailed description of Relford's murder. The letter was addressed to the Beacon but did not arrive for several weeks.

==== "How many do I have to kill?" (February 1978) ====
On February 10, 1978, Rader sent a letter to Wichita television station KAKE, again claiming responsibility for the Otero murders, along with those of Bright, Relford and Fox. He demanded more media attention in this second letter, writing, "How many do I have to kill, before I get a name in the paper or some national attention?" He further suggested many possible names for himself, including "BTK." Rader wrote that he was driven to kill by "factor X", which he characterized as a supernatural element that also motivated Jack the Ripper, the Son of Sam and the Hillside Stranglers. He instructed police to respond to him with a hidden message. The letter was traced to a copy machine at the WSU library, where Rader was a student at the time. Enclosed with the letter was a poem entitled "Oh! Death to Nancy", a parody of the lyrics to the American folk song "O Death".

==== "Oh Anna" (June 1979) ====
On June 15, 1979, two months after the failed murder attempt on Williams, Rader left a letter outside her residence, which read, "Oh Anna, Why Didn't You Appear?", followed by the BTK signature. Prior to the communication, it had been privately discussed among detectives that the break-in at her residence was possibly linked with BTK. The envelope also contained a drawing of a nude bound woman, a scarf and two plastic clips. The scarf and clips had been taken in the April break-in.

==== "Oh God He Put Kelli Sherri In The Tub" (January 1988) ====
In January 1988, Mary Fager received an envelope postmarked January 5. The envelope contained a poem entitled "Oh God He Put Kelli Sherri in the Tub" and a picture of a young nude girl bound at the wrists and ankles lying next to a pool or hot tub. Fager's husband, Melvin, and two young daughters had been murdered in the Fager home on December 27, 1987. Her daughters Sherri Fager (10) and Kelli (16) were found in an aboveground hot tub. Sherri had been bound and drowned in the hot tub. Kelli had been strangled and placed nude in the hot tub approximately eight hours after Sherri. Melvin had been shot. Rader has not been connected to these murders, nor does he claim to have committed them, but said he admired the homicide, stating, "Another one prowls the deep abyss of lewd thoughts and deeds." Rader also drew his own depiction of the murders, which was not accurate to the scene.

=== Investigation ===
The subliminal message to Rader that was flashed by KAKE-TV in 1978

In 1978, with the knowledge that BTK watched KAKE news programming, police decided to flash a subliminal message during one of the station's evening newscasts for a split second. The message stated: "Now call the chief" and featured a drawing of an upside-down pair of glasses, which were found at the Fox crime scene. Police hoped the message would influence the perpetrator to turn himself in, but it was unsuccessful.

In the mid-1980s, with BTK still having not been identified, a new task force of detectives colloquially known as the "Ghostbusters" revamped the investigation based on advances in forensic evidence. Over the span of three years, investigators compared blood and saliva samples with as many as 225 suspects, many of whom no longer lived in Wichita, and all but seven were cleared.

The case was still considered active in the 1990s, but investigators described their frustration with diminishing leads and worthless tips. Many former detectives on the case believed the killer was either imprisoned for another crime, was institutionalized, or was deceased. At a lecture at WSU, former FBI agent Robert Ressler correctly assumed the killer was a graduate student in the criminal justice field. In 1998, investigators opted to use geographic profiling in an attempt to locate BTK's possible area of residence.

== Hiatus years ==
During his "cooling off" periods between murders, Rader would take pictures of himself wearing women's clothes and a female mask while bound. He later admitted that he was pretending to be his victims as part of his sexual fantasy. Also during this period, Rader committed numerous burglaries, mostly stealing underwear, jewelry and money. He kept his proclivities well hidden, and was widely regarded in his community as "normal, polite, and well mannered." Rader was a member of Christ Lutheran Church in Wichita, and in January 2005 was elected president of the church council. He was also a Cub Scout leader.

In 1989, Rader was a field operations supervisor for the Wichita area during the 1990 United States census. In May 1991, he became a dogcatcher and compliance officer in Park City. In this role, neighbors described Rader as being sometimes overzealous and extremely strict. One neighbor recalled observing Rader in their front lawn with a tape measure trying to determine if their grass was too long; another claimed they spotted Rader in their adjoining backyards filming their house; and a female neighbor complained that Rader killed her dog for no reason. Rader served on the Sedgwick County Animal Control Advisory Board from 1996 to 1998.

Rader's neighbors recalled him taking special pleasure in bullying and harassing single women. Two women he stalked in the 1980s, and one whom he stalked in the mid-1990s, filed restraining orders against him; one of these women also changed her address to avoid him.

== Later murders ==
=== Marine Hedge ===
Marine Hedge (53), whom Rader referred to as "Project Cookie", lived only a few houses away from his Park City residence and was targeted just to see if Rader could murder one of his neighbors and get away with it. On the night of April 27, 1985, Rader faked a headache that he blamed on inclement weather, affording him the opportunity to leave a Cub Scouts outing on the pretense of driving home. Rader drove to a deserted area where he quickly changed out of his Cub Scouts attire. He then drove to a bowling alley at 21st Street and Woodlawn, where he ordered a beer, swished it in his mouth and splashed it on his face and clothes. Rader called a taxi using a fake slurred drunk voice, then was dropped off one street down from where he and Hedge lived.

Rader cut the phone line to Hedge's home before he broke in and hid inside a bedroom closet. After some waiting, Hedge came home with her boyfriend, leading Rader to wait even longer in the closet until after the boyfriend left. After he was confident Hedge was in bed, he crept out of the closet and quickly flipped on the bathroom light switch. Hedge woke up and began screaming. Rader subdued and handcuffed Hedge before strangling her to death with his bare hands.

Rader felt compelled to remove Hedge's body from the house to "tie her up and take pictures of her." After finding her car keys and collecting mementos, he stripped and then dragged her body out to her car. He drove her to the Christ Lutheran Church, to which he had a set of keys, dragging her body inside and covering the windows with garbage bags, ensuring no light would be visible from the outside. Rader then began positioning Hedge's body in the church and taking photographs of her corpse "tied up and in sexually graphic positions." As daylight approached, Rader cleaned the scene, removed the garbage bags off the windows, turned off the lights and returned Hedge's body to the trunk. Rader drove a short distance away and dumped her body in a remote ditch, covering her with brush.

On May 2, police located Hedge's abandoned car at a Wichita shopping center. On May 5, investigators recovered Hedge's nude body, alongside a pair of knotted pantyhose, from a ditch 7 miles (11 km) from her home.

=== Vicki Wegerle ===
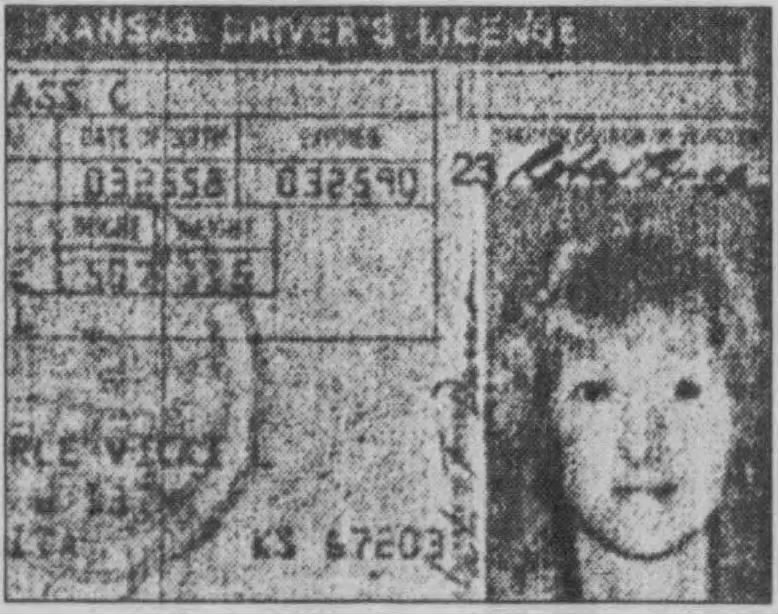
Photocopy of Vicki Wegerle's driver's license that Rader stole and would later mail to police in 2004

By late 1986, Rader was still an ADT employee. While working in the field, he saw Vicki Lynn Wegerle (28) get into her car. Rader stalked Wegerle for a short time, hearing her playing piano while prowling around outside her house. He subsequently referred to her as "Project Piano".

On September 16, 1986, Rader used an ADT hard-hat and a Southwestern Bell manual to pose as a technician for the telephone company. Rader first gained entry into Wegerle's neighbor's house, and pretended to do telephone work, before leaving and knocking on Wegerle's door, doing so to make Wegerle less suspicious. Once inside the house, Rader told Wegerle he had to check the "telephone terminals". She directed him to the phone near the dining room table. Rader made small talk with Wegerle as he pretended to check the phone. After declaring the phone line looked okay, Rader pulled a gun on Wegerle and instructed her to go to the bedroom.

Wegerle told Rader that her husband Bill would be home soon, but he persisted. Rader forced her into the bedroom, where she broke free of her bonds and scratched his face hard enough that, at the time of his confession twenty years later, he testified that he "probably still ha[d] the scratch somewhere ... if you looked." The struggle upset Wegerle's dogs, who began barking. Rader grew nervous, because the windows were open and he did not know when Wegerle's husband would be home. Regardless, Rader strangled Wegerle. Despite the lack of time, he took pictures of her body after he killed her for "sexual purposes".

Rader fled with Wegerle's car and passed her husband on the way out; witnesses reported seeing the car leaving the house at 10:30 a.m. Rader parked the car in a grocery store parking lot two blocks away and drove back home in his own vehicle. As he passed the Wegerle residence, he saw paramedics responding. Police recovered the vehicle at 12:10 p.m. and suspected the driver was Wegerle's killer. However, up until Rader confessed to the crimes, some police officers and members of the community believed her husband Bill was the killer and he "lived under a cloud of suspicion" for almost two decades.

=== Dolores Davis ===
Rader targeted Dolores Davis (62) after observing her not far from where he lived, referring to her as "Project Dogside" because of dog kennels north of her home. Rader "cased" Davis' residence many times trying to figure out a plan to gain entry.

On January 18, 1991, the Trappers Scouts were having their annual "dead of winter" outing at Harvey County Park West. Rader went to the park and set up camp before fabricating a story and leaving. Rader drove to his parents' house and changed out of his Trappers Scouts uniform. He then drove to Park City Baptist Church, to which he had a key in relation to his scouting duties. Rader left the church, walked through adjoining wheat fields and cut through a cemetery to get to Davis' home. The severe cold drove Rader to break into the house by smashing the window rather than trying a quieter method.

Between 10:30 p.m. and 11 p.m., Rader arrived at Davis' home, looked through her window blinds and saw her reading. Rader waited until the interior lights had been out for a few minutes before throwing a cinder block through the sliding glass door. Upon being confronted by Davis, Rader told her he would tie her up and leave her but take her car and some food. Davis refused and told him to leave, at which point Rader informed her that he had a gun, a club and a knife on his person; Davis became cooperative. Rader obtained the keys to Davis' car and ransacked the kitchen, pretending to look for food. Davis begged for her life, prompting Rader to strangle her with pantyhose. He initially intended to stay and take photos with Davis' body but left sooner than planned when Davis falsely told him she was expecting company.

Rader used a bedspread to drag Davis' body to her car and put her in the trunk. He drove her car to a lake adjacent to the Kansas Department of Transportation (KDOT), where he dumped her body in the bushes. He then drove back to Davis' home and threw her keys on the roof, having read that police had looked for the Oteros' keys on the roof of their home. Rader walked back to Park City Baptist Church to pick up his car. Rader drove back to the lake, collected Davis's body and drove out to a rural area, where he dumped the body again underneath a bridge. He elected to leave immediately without taking pictures of the body because he needed to get back to the Trappers Scouts camp before his absence raised suspicion.

Davis' body was discovered on February 1, 1991, by fifteen-year-old Nelson Schock after he followed his dog under the bridge.

== List of victims ==
Name	Age	Date of attack	Place of attack	Fate of victim
Joseph Otero	38	January 15, 1974	803 N. Edgemoor Street, Wichita, Kansas	Killed, suffocated with plastic bag
Joseph Otero Jr.	9	January 15, 1974	803 N. Edgemoor Street, Wichita, Kansas	Killed, suffocated with plastic bag
Josephine Otero	11	January 15, 1974	803 N. Edgemoor Street, Wichita, Kansas	Killed, hanged with rope
Julia Maria Otero	33	January 15, 1974	803 N. Edgemoor Street, Wichita, Kansas	Killed, strangled with rope
Kathryn Doreen Bright	21	April 4, 1974	3217 E. 13th Street N., Wichita	Killed, stabbed with knife
Kevin Bright	19	April 4, 1974	3217 E. 13th Street N., Wichita	Survived, shot in forehead
Shirley Ruth Vian Relford	24	March 17, 1977	1311 S. Hydraulic Street, Wichita	Killed, strangled with rope
Nancy Jo Fox	25	December 8, 1977	843 S. Pershing Street, Wichita	Killed, strangled with belt
Marine Wallace Hedge	53	April 27, 1985	6254 N. Independence Street, Park City, Kansas	Killed, strangled bare-handed
Vicki Lynn Wegerle	28	September 16, 1986	2404 W. 13th Street N., Wichita	Killed, strangled with nylon stocking
Dolores Earline Johnson Davis	62	January 19, 1991	6226 N. Hillside Street, Wichita	Killed, strangled with pantyhose

== 2000s developments ==
By the early 2000s, the BTK investigation was considered a cold case. Local author Robert Beattie began writing a book about the killings, Nightmare in Wichita, after being shocked to learn that many young people had never heard of the murders. In January 2004, ahead of the thirtieth anniversary of the Otero murders, the Eagle published the story under the headline "BTK case unsolved, 30 years later"; in a 2005 interview, Rader said he saw the story and was "kind of bored", so he decided to resurface as BTK and resume sending letters.

=== BTK reemerges ===
On March 19, 2004, the Eagle received a letter from someone using the pseudonym "Bill Thomas Killman", claiming that he had murdered Vicki Wegerle in 1986. Enclosed with the message were photographs of the crime scene and a photocopy of Wegerle's driver's license, which had been stolen at the time of the murder. Prior to this message, it had not been definitively established that Wegerle was killed by BTK. DNA collected from under her fingernails provided police with previously unknown evidence. They began DNA testing hundreds of men, including police officers and college professors, in an effort to find the killer. Altogether, more than 1,300 DNA samples were taken and later destroyed by court order.

Rader's letter to The Wichita Eagle under the name "Bill Thomas Killman"

In May, KAKE received a letter with chapter headings for a proposed book called The BTK Story, fake IDs and a word puzzle. On June 9, a package was found taped to a stop sign at the corner of First and Kansas roads in Wichita, which contained graphic descriptions of the Otero murders and a sketch labeled, "The Sexual Thrill Is My Bill." Also enclosed was a chapter list for The BTK Story, which mimicked a story about BTK written in 1999 by Court TV crime writer David Lohr. In July, a package dropped into the return slot at a public library contained more material, including the claim that BTK was responsible for the death of nineteen-year-old Jake Allen in Argonia, Kansas, earlier that month. This claim was false, and that death was ruled a suicide.

In his correspondence, Rader revealed considerable information about himself to detectives, including that he was former military and had a fascination with trains. Conversely, he also gave investigators misleading or false information, claiming he was born in 1939 and moved around frequently as a child. After his capture, Rader admitted under questioning that he had been planning to kill again, that he had set a date (October 2004) and was stalking his intended victim. That month, a manila envelope was dropped into a UPS box in Wichita. It contained many cards with images of terror and bondage of children pasted on them, a poem threatening the life of lead investigator Lieutenant Ken Landwehr and a false autobiography with many details about Rader's life. These details were later released to the public. In December, Wichita police discovered another package in Wichita's Murdock Park, which contained the driver's license of Nancy Fox, which was noted as stolen from the crime scene, as well as a doll that was symbolically bound at the hands and feet with a plastic bag tied over its head.

In January 2005, Rader attempted to leave a cereal box in the bed of a pickup truck at a Home Depot in Wichita, but the box was discarded by the truck's owner. It was later retrieved from the trash after Rader asked what had become of it in a later message. Surveillance tape of the parking lot from that date revealed a distant figure driving a black Jeep Cherokee leaving the box in the pickup. In February, more postcards were sent to KAKE, and another cereal box left at a rural location was found to contain another bound doll.

In his letters to police, Rader asked whether his writings, if put on a floppy disk, could be traced. Police answered his question in a classified ad posted in the Eagle, saying, "Rex, it will be ok." On February 16, Rader sent a purple 1.44-megabyte Memorex floppy disk to Wichita station KSAS-TV. Also enclosed were a letter, a gold-colored necklace with a large medallion and a photocopy of the cover of Rules of Prey, a 1989 novel by John Sandford about a serial killer.

=== Surveillance of Rader ===
Police found metadata embedded in a deleted Microsoft Word document that was, unknown to Rader, still stored on the floppy disk. It was a church meeting agenda written and edited by Rader himself. The metadata contained the words "Christ Lutheran Church" and the document was marked as last modified by "Dennis". An Internet search determined that a "Dennis Rader" was president of the church council. When investigators drove by Rader's home, a black Jeep Cherokee was parked outside. This was strong circumstantial evidence against Rader, but police needed more direct evidence to detain him.

Police obtained a warrant to test a pap smear taken from Rader's daughter at the Kansas State University medical clinic. DNA tests showed a "familial match" between the pap smear and the sample from Wegerle's fingernails; this indicated that the killer was closely related to Rader's daughter and, combined with the other evidence, was enough for police to arrest Rader.

== Arrest ==
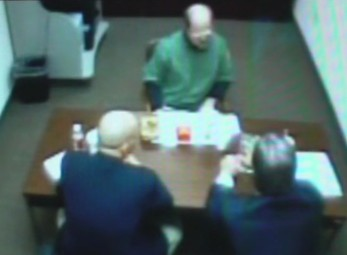
Rader (top) during his interrogation

Rader was arrested while driving near his Park City home shortly after noon on February 25, 2005. An officer asked, "Mr. Rader, do you know why you're going downtown?" Rader replied, "Oh, I have suspicions why." Officers from the Wichita Police Department, the Kansas Bureau of Investigation, the Federal Bureau of Investigation and the Bureau of Alcohol, Tobacco, Firearms and Explosives searched Rader's home and vehicle, seizing evidence including computer equipment, a pair of black pantyhose retrieved from a shed and a cylindrical container. Christ Lutheran Church, Rader's office and the main branch of the Park City library were also searched. At a press conference the next morning, Wichita Police Chief Norman Williams announced, "The bottom line: BTK is arrested."

Under questioning, Rader asked about the death penalty in Kansas and inquired several times about what his potential sentence would end up being. He further asked whether he would be assigned to a "special section" of prison or among the "loonies" in the general population. At one point, Rader told an officer to put "BTK" on the lid of his cup before putting it in the refrigerator, rather than his own name.

== Legal proceedings ==
On February 28, 2005, Rader was charged in the Sedgwick County District Court with ten counts of first-degree murder. Soon afterward, the Associated Press cited an anonymous source alleging that Rader had confessed to other murders in addition to those with which he had been officially connected. However, the Sedgwick County district attorney denied the story, yet refused to say whether Rader had made any confessions or if investigators were looking into his possible involvement in more unsolved killings. On March 5, news sources claimed to have verified by multiple sources that Rader had confessed to the ten murders he was charged with, but no others. On March 1, Rader's bail was set at US$10 million, and a public defender was appointed to represent him. On May 3, the judge entered not guilty pleas on Rader's behalf, as Rader did not speak at his arraignment.

=== Conviction and sentencing ===
On June 27, the scheduled trial date, Rader changed his plea to guilty. He coldly described the murders, which he referred to as "projects", in detail to the court and made no apologies.

At Rader's August 18 sentencing, victims' families made statements, after which Rader apologized in a rambling thirty-minute monologue that the prosecutor likened to an Academy Awards acceptance speech. His statement has been described as an example of an often-observed phenomenon among psychopaths: the inability to understand the emotional content of language. Rader was sentenced to ten consecutive life sentences, with a minimum of 175 years. Kansas did not enforce the death penalty at the time of the murders. On August 19, Rader was moved to the El Dorado Correctional Facility in Prospect Township, Butler County, Kansas.

=== Psychological evaluation ===
Rader's defense lawyers hired Massachusetts psychologist Robert Mendoza to conduct a psychological evaluation and determine if an insanity-based defense might be viable. Mendoza conducted an interview after Rader had pleaded guilty on June 27, 2005. Mendoza diagnosed Rader with narcissistic, obsessive-compulsive and antisocial personality disorders: he observed that Rader has a grandiose sense of self, a belief that he is "special" and therefore entitled to special treatment; a pathological need for attention and admiration; a preoccupation with maintaining rigid order and structure; and a complete lack of empathy.

The videotape of Mendoza's interview ended up being broadcast on Dateline NBC. NBC News claimed Rader knew the interview might be televised, but this was false according to the Sedgwick County Sheriff's Office. Rader mentioned the interview during his sentencing statement. On October 25, 2005, Kansas attorney general Phill Kline filed a petition to sue Mendoza and Tali Waters, co-owners of Cambridge Forensic Consultants LLC, for breach of contract, claiming that they intended to benefit financially from the use of information obtained through their involvement in Rader's defense. On May 10, 2007, Mendoza settled the case for US$30,000 with no admission of wrongdoing.

== Aftermath ==
Rader talked about innocuous topics such as the weather during the forty-minute drive to El Dorado but began to cry when the victims' families' statements from the court proceedings were broadcast on the radio. He now lives in solitary confinement for his own protection, which will likely continue until his death.

In April 2006, the Kansas Department of Corrections cited Rader's good behavior in their decision to grant him privileges such as allowing him to possess a television set, listen to the radio, read books and possess art supplies. Prosecutors had argued in favor of not giving such privileges, saying images of women and children along with news accounts of his murders would allow him to relive his sadistic fantasies.

In 2019, Rader's daughter, Kerri Rawson, published her book A Serial Killer's Daughter: My Story of Faith, Love, and Overcoming where she discusses Rader's role in her childhood. In an 2019 interview, Kerri stated she writes to her father and has forgiven him, but still struggles to reconcile her "normal" childhood with the knowledge that she was raised by BTK. Rawson visited Rader in 2023 and reported him as "rotting" and "unhappy", reporting that "he's lost like seven inches and he's in a wheelchair." At the 2024 Crime Con, Kerri presented excerpts from her father's journal which suggested he had sexually abused her when she was a child.

Rawson stated in an interview that Rader had been disciplined by prison officials for corresponding with "fans", including sending personal items such as clothing, glasses, and artwork featuring BTK symbols.

=== Further investigations ===
Following Rader's arrest, police in Wichita and several surrounding cities investigated unsolved cases in cooperation with state and federal authorities. They particularly focused on cases from after 1994, when the death penalty was reinstated in Kansas. Law enforcement in neighboring states also examined cold cases that matched Rader's pattern. After exhaustive investigations, none of these agencies discovered any additional murders definitively attributable to Rader, supporting early suspicions that he would have claimed responsibility for any further crimes he had committed. Consequently, the ten known murders were believed to be the only cases for which Rader was responsible, although Wichita police are fairly certain he stalked and researched several other potential victims. This includes one individual who was spared when Rader called off his planned attack upon arriving near the target's home, due to the presence of nearby construction crews. In his police interview, Rader stated, "there are a lot of lucky people", indicating that he had considered and developed various levels of murder plans for other victims.

In August 2023, the Associated Press reported that authorities discovered "possible trophies" from victims after launching a search of evidence recovered from Rader's home, resulting in the investigation of his potential involvement in additional unsolved disappearances and murders. Among the cases was the disappearance of Cynthia Dawn Kinney (16) in Pawhuska, Oklahoma, on June 23, 1976, when she was last seen leaving a local laundromat. Osage Sheriff Eddie Virden stated that Rader had been identified as a prime suspect after it was determined that he had participated in Cub Scout events in the area and had included the phrase "bad wash day" in his writings. A bank across the street from the laundromat was also having ADT alarms installed when Kinney went missing; Rader was a regional installer for ADT at the time. Furthermore, Rader has allegedly claimed to have "fantasized about kidnapping a girl from a laundromat". Rader has denied involvement in the murder, which Virden believes is due to fear that he would possibly be extradited and tried in Oklahoma and potentially being given the death penalty.

In June 2023 the Osage County Sheriff's Office asked Rader's daughter, Kerri Rawson, to help with its investigation. Working as a volunteer, she questioned her father about Kinney and other possible victims during two prison visits, accompanied investigators to places she recognized from her childhood in Kansas and Missouri, and joined a national task force the sheriff's office created to examine the Kinney case. In September 2023, District Attorney Mike Fisher said he was not in a position to file charges against Rader in Kinney's disappearance, expressed concern about how the sheriff's office had handled a dig at Rader's former property in Park City, Kansas, and asked the Oklahoma State Bureau of Investigation to open a formal investigation; he described his relationship with Sheriff Virden as "broken". In April 2024, after receiving from an anonymous woman a word-search puzzle that Rader had sent to a news station in 2004, investigators took a renewed look at it and found the words "Cindy", "Kinney", "laundry mat" and "Pawhuska"; Virden said the finding was still being evaluated.

Rader had also been named publicly as the prime suspect in the 1990 murder of twenty-two-year-old Shawna Garber in McDonald County, Missouri. However, cold case investigators eventually concluded a different killer was responsible for her death.

== In media ==
Forensic psychologist Katherine Ramsland compiled Confession of a Serial Killer from her five-year correspondence with Rader. Michael H. Stone, a forensic psychiatrist from Columbia University, analyzed Rader's case in his 2009 book The Anatomy of Evil by using his scale of evil.

Documentaries and TV specials:

- KSNW documented the then-unidentified BTK killer in the 2002 series, "BTK: A New Theory".
- Born to Kill? covered Rader's crimes and personal life in season 4, episode 6, "Dennis Rader: The Bind and Torture Killer (BTK)".
- The Netflix docuseries Catching Killers went over the BTK case on Season 2, Episode 1.
- The 2025 Netflix documentary My Father, the BTK Killer, produced and directed by Skye Borgman, focuses on the devastating consequences for Dennis Rader's family following his arrest and confession of multiple killings, especially on the life of his daughter, Kerri Rawson.

Multiple creative works draw on the case:

- Stephen King has said his novella A Good Marriage, and the film based on it, were inspired by the BTK killer.
- Novelist Thomas Harris has said that the character of Francis Dolarhyde in his 1981 novel Red Dragon is partially based on the then-unidentified BTK killer.
- The 2004 Law & Order: Special Victims Unit episode "Scavenger" is based on this case.
- Episode 15 of season 1 (2006) of Criminal Minds, titled "Unfinished Business", is based on Rader's murders.
- A character based on Rader played by actor Sonny Valicenti appears in the Netflix series Mindhunter.
- The antagonist from the movie The Clovehitch Killer was inspired by Dennis Rader.
- Thrash metal band Exodus wrote a song entitled "BTK" for their album Blood In, Blood Out, which was inspired by Rader's crimes.
- Japanese doom metal band Church of Misery has a song titled "B.T.K" on their 2013 studio album Thy Kingdom Scum.
- The song "Raider II" from Steven Wilson's 2011 album Grace for Drowning is written primarily about Rader's murders.
- There is a line referring to BTK in the Indian Telugu film, HIT: The Third Case, as the antagonist's murders were planned similarly to his in the film.

== See also ==
- I Survived BTK – 2010 American documentary film
- List of serial killers by number of victims
- List of serial killers in the United States
