= The Healer (2016 film) =

2016 Spanish-Canadian-American film

- Film poster
- Directed by: Paco Arango
- Written by: Paco Arango
- Produced by: Paco Arango; Enrique Posner; Michael Volpe
- Starring: Oliver Jackson-Cohen; Camilla Luddington; Kaitlyn Bernard; Jorge Garcia; Jonathan Pryce
- Cinematography: Javier Aguirresarobe
- Edited by: Teresa Font
- Music by: Nathan Wang
- Release date: September 16, 2016 (Atlantic)
- Running time: 113 minutes
- Countries: Spain; Canada; United States
- Language: English
- Box office: $12.2 million

The Healer is a 2016 Spanish-Canadian-American comedy-drama film written and directed by Paco Arango and starring Oliver Jackson-Cohen, Camilla Luddington, Kaitlyn Bernard, Jorge Garcia and Jonathan Pryce. The film, whose profits were pledged to Paul Newman’s SeriousFun Children's Network, was panned by critics, who acknowledged the altruistic intent was not matched by the quality of the film itself.

== Plot ==
Electrical engineer Alec Bailey, struggling after his parents' and twin brother Charlie's deaths, sleeps around, gambles, has a failing television repair business called The Healer, and is drowning in debt. Suddenly, Alec's estranged uncle, Raymond Heacock, offers to pay his £88,000 debt in exchange for him moving to Nova Scotia, Canada, for a whole year. Although not thrilled, Russian debt collectors chase him into a church where the priest suggests this might be a second chance, so he accepts the offer.

Two days later, he moves to his Uncle Raymond's house near Lunenburg, Nova Scotia. His first day in town, Alec meets Cecilia, who knows his uncle, and helps Alec place an ad in the local newspaper for work. His first days in town do not go well: meeting Father Malloy, he tells him he is Buddhist to avoid going to church; Officer Tom gives him a citation, making it clear he dislikes his uncle; and the newspaper ad, headed "The Healer", says he can fix anything. Suddenly, because of the ad, people start showing up at his house asking for miracles. Alec is frustrated at the confusion and at not getting any electrical business.

Needing money, Alec starts working with Cecilia, a veterinarian. Strangely, one by one, each of the people who came to him to be healed were actually getting cured, although he refused to see them and told them he was an engineer, not a doctor. The strangest incident came when Father Malloy had a heart attack and died in front of Alec, but minutes later came back to life. Officer Tom misunderstands the situation, arresting Alec for Father Malloy's murder, until Malloy calls to confirm he is in fact alive. Malloy then tells Alec he believes he has a God-given gift to heal people.

Alec is fed up with people thinking he can heal them and returns to his uncle's to pack. While doing so, he finds a key for the basement with a note. There, he finds pictures of his ancestors and an empty frame with his name. His uncle's note explains their family has a secret gift to heal that skips every other generation. Told he must accept the gift before midnight or he will lose it forever, Alec feels overwhelmed. He is asked to explain his decision to the entire town and they are understanding, simply thanking him for the help he did give.

Although he did not accept the gift, his uncle will pay his debt if Alec remains the whole year, so he stays. A few days later, a family from Fredericton, New Brunswick, arrives, begging him to heal their daughter Abigail of cancer. Alec explains he cannot help, but agrees to spend the weekend with her, after she insists, for her parents' sake. Alec and Cecilia quickly bond with her. He also makes up with Officer Tom, who reveals that Abigail is his niece. After that weekend, Alec is particularly moved, as his twin Charlie had died of cancer. Going back to his uncle, he tells him he regrets not accepting the gift, then goes to church, angrily asking God for the gift back to save Abigail.

Some time later, Abigail tells Alec and Cecilia the cancer is in remission. Hearing the good news they kiss. As Alec has got the gift back, his uncle returns to England after they make up. The last scene is a shot of the basement, showing the framed and labeled 'Alec Bailey' portrait.

During the closing credits, scenes filmed at various of the global community of camps operated by the SeriousFun Children's Network are shown, with a dedication to founder Paul Newman.

== Cast ==
- Oliver Jackson-Cohen as Alec/Charlie Bailey
- Camilla Luddington as Cecilia
- Jorge Garcia as Father Malloy
- Kaitlyn Bernard as Abigail
- Adrian G. Griffiths as Tom
- Jonathan Pryce as Raymond

== Reception ==
The film has a 17% rating on Rotten Tomatoes, summarized by Michael Rechtshaffen of the Los Angeles Times as "although the cause may be noble, the end effect is decidedly less rewarding."
