= I Survived BTK =

2010 American documentary film

- Directed by: Marc D. Levitz
- Written by: Marc D. Levitz; Steve Armstrong
- Produced by: Marc D. Levitz
- Music by: Black Rebel Motorcycle Club; GG Allin; Wesley Willis; St. Olaf Choir; Dax Riggs; Deadboy & the Elephantmen
- Production companies: UNSUB Films, LLC
- Release date: July 2010 (Fantasia International Film Festival)
- Running time: 87 minutes
- Country: United States
- Language: English

I Survived BTK (also released under the titles Feast of the Assumption: BTK and the Otero Family Murders and Feast of the Assumption: the Otero Family Murders), is a feature-length, true-crime/horror documentary produced by UNSUB Films and directed by Marc D. Levitz.

The film focuses on Charlie Otero as he copes with discovering the truth behind the murders of four of his family members by Dennis Rader, a serial killer known as "BTK". I Survived BTK aired on DOC: The Documentary Channel on 15 January 2012, the 38th anniversary of the Otero family murder.

== Synopsis ==
I Survived BTK follows Charlie Otero, who, as a teenager, discovered the bodies of his parents and two younger siblings after returning home from school on January 15, 1974. Thirty years later his family's murderer, the BTK serial killer, was discovered and brought to justice. The movie chronicles Charlie's search for the truth about that day and his attempts to reconcile with the past.

== Reception ==
Critical reviews for I Survived BTK were mixed, with the Documentary Channel blog saying "Ultimately, while I Survived BTK summons up some scary stuff, from the very real possibility that anyone’s life can be suddenly changed at the hands of a serial killer to the more supernatural ideas of voodoo and karmic retribution, it’s a fairly positive and hopeful documentary considering its subject matter." The London FrightFest's blog called the film "a genuinely disturbing piece of work."

The Pitch wrote that "there are amazing moments in Levitz's documentary" but that "the film lags after Rader is sentenced to life in prison without parole and Charlie goes back to his search for a normal life." Twitch Film stated that the film felt "incomplete" and that it "succeeds its journalistic ethical test, but would have greatly benefited from a more refined post-production."

Dread Central's Andy Mauro wrote that the film was "by no means" a terrible documentary, but that it was ultimately disappointing due to elements such as "weak explanations". The San Francisco Bay Guardian stated that the film "would merit further discussion if it didn't wobble between tabloid TV and home movie — all the while raising serious questions it doesn't address, or perhaps even notice."

== Screenings ==
The film screened at several film festivals, including the 2010 Fantasia International Film Festival and the 2008 Milan International Film Festival.

== Accolades ==
In 2012, I Survived BTK was considered for multiple Primetime Emmy Awards, including Outstanding Directing for Nonfiction Programming, and Outstanding Writing for Nonfiction Programming. I Survived BTK was also shortlisted for Exceptional Merit In Documentary Filmmaking that same year.
