= Nightmare in Wichita =

2005 true crime book

- Author: Robert Beattie
- Language: English
- Genre: True crime
- Publisher: Penguin Books
- Publication date: 2005
- Publication place: United States
- English publication date: 2005
- Pages: 352 pp
- ISBN: 0-451-21738-1

Nightmare in Wichita: The Hunt for the BTK Strangler by lawyer Robert Beattie is a non-fiction book about a serial killer in Wichita, Kansas, known as the BTK Strangler. The book debuted at No. 4 on The New York Times bestseller list upon its April 2005 release.

Dennis Rader, a city compliance officer and church council president working in Park City, just north of Wichita, was ultimately arrested, charged and convicted of the crimes. Beattie, who lives in Wichita, compiled the book based on interviews with police officers and detectives familiar with the case. Rader's capture, on February 25, 2005, happened just as the book was in the final stages of editing. An addendum about Rader and his arrest was added before the book went to press.

Many, including some Wichita police officers, have speculated that the fact that a book about BTK was being written was what caused the killer to reemerge in 2004, which led to his arrest the following year. Beattie researched the book for two years.

In its review, TruTV's "Crime Library" criticized the book for filling up "many, many pages with (the author's) meetings with various individuals that clearly interested Beattie, but are likely to bore readers." But the article also credited the book for including "quite a bit of detail that never got into the newspapers."
