= Wayne Roberts (director) =

American film director

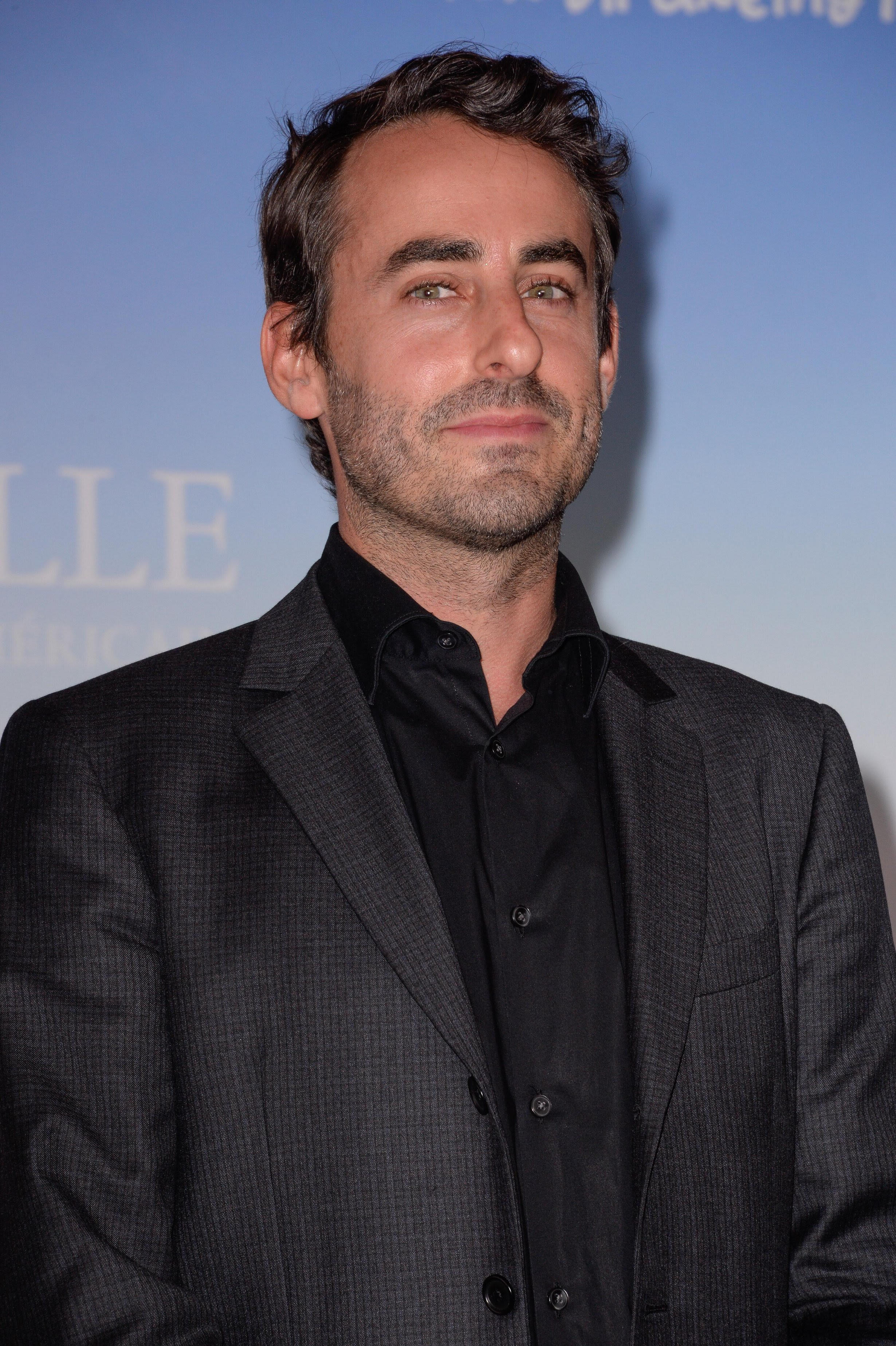
- Born: Alaska, United States
- Education: New York University
- Occupations: Film director, screenwriter
- Years active: 2016–present

Wayne Roberts is an American film director and screenwriter, known for his work on the films Katie Says Goodbye (2016) and The Professor (2018).

== Life and career ==
Born and raised in Alaska, Roberts attended and graduated from the New York University's Tisch School of the Arts. He majored in film and philosophy.

Roberts made his directorial debut with the drama film Katie Says Goodbye. The film premiered at the Toronto International Film Festival in 2016 and was noted for its compelling storytelling and strong performances. The film stars Olivia Cooke as a young small-town waitress that turns to sex work in hopes of building a better future for herself. Christopher Abbott, Mary Steenburgen, Jim Belushi, and Mireille Enos also co-starred.

In 2018, Roberts wrote and directed the comedy drama The Professor (2018), which starred Johnny Depp as a terminally ill college professor. Danny Huston, Rosemarie DeWitt, and Zoey Deutch also co-starred.
