= Fair Extension =

2010 novella by Stephen King

- Author: Stephen King
- Language: English
- Genre: Horror/Comedy horror
- Published in: Full Dark, No Stars
- Publisher: Scribner
- Publication date: 2010
- Publication place: United States
- Media type: Hardcover

Fair Extension is a novella by American writer Stephen King, published in his collection Full Dark, No Stars (2010).

== Synopsis ==
In August 2001, on his way home in Derry, Maine, Dave Streeter sees a man with a setup by a road to the airport. He goes out and talks with the man, George Elvid, who claims to have lived for centuries and tells Streeter that he sells extensions of various types. Elvid offers Streeter, who suffers from terminal lung cancer, a chance to live for approximately fifteen years if he pays fifteen percent of his income for every one of those years and transfers the "weight" of his misfortune onto someone he knows. Elvid emphasizes that it has to be someone that Streeter truly hates.

Streeter selects Tom Goodhugh, his best friend since childhood whom he has secretly hated for years. Streeter has done everything for Goodhugh, who has taken him for granted the entire time. Goodhugh got straight-As with Streeter doing his homework throughout their formative years. Later, Goodhugh stole Streeter's girlfriend in college and married her. Goodhugh has founded a successful waste removal business with Streeter's assistance, lives a lavish lifestyle with three children on the fast track to great lives, and does not look like age has caught up with him, unlike Streeter.

A couple of days later, Streeter goes to his doctor, who tells him his tumors are shrinking. Four months later, Streeter is declared cancer-free, which perplexes his doctor. The good luck continues in subsequent years, as Streeter is promoted several times at work and his marriage becomes joyous and rich with significant lifestyle improvements. His children begin a long line of career successes: his son becomes a millionaire after creating two bestselling video games and his daughter gets her dream job as a journalist at the Boston Globe after graduating from the Columbia School of Journalism.

Goodhugh's misfortunes start to surface a few months after Streeter's deal, when his wife is diagnosed with breast cancer that has spread to her lymph nodes; she dies six months later. His business begins to fail after his accountant embezzles $2 million and skips town. Goodhugh's children also suffer: his middle child, Carl, has a heart attack and is left with permanent brain damage; his oldest child, Gracie, loses her husband to a drunk driver, loses all her teeth after developing pyorrhea, and eventually gives birth to a stillborn baby; and his youngest son, Jake, turns down an athletic scholarship to help save the garbage business.

While Streeter continues to enjoy his good fortune, Goodhugh's life becomes grim and joyless. Gracie is forced to move back home and becomes deeply depressed; Carl's full-time caretaker is let go, leading to Carl's death by choking on an apple; and Jake is sent to prison for stabbing his wife. Goodhugh's waste disposal company is seized by the EPA. Goodhugh himself develops gout and psoriasis, begins drinking heavily, and experiences major weight loss. He contemplates suicide, likens himself to Job, and believes he has "offended God". Although Streeter pretends to be caring and supportive, he is secretly glad as he sees Goodhugh struggle to cope with his family's misfortune.

The story ends with Streeter and his wife stargazing. She confesses her sadness over the Goodhugh family's troubles, and he assures her that this is only fair, and that some people are simply dealt a bad hand by life. They catch a glimpse of the planet Venus, and Streeter tells his wife to make a wish. She cannot think of anything they need, and the story ends with Streeter making a single wish: for more.

== See also ==
- Stephen King short fiction bibliography
