= Zak Hilditch =

Australian director and writer

Zak Hilditch is an Australian director and writer from Perth in Western Australia. Hilditch studied film at Curtin University and is known for the films These Final Hours (2013), 1922 (2017) and We Bury The Dead (2024).

== Filmography ==
Short film

Year	Title	Director	Writer
2006	At Play	Yes	Yes
2006	The Glimpse	Yes	Yes
2007	Before Closing	Yes	Yes
2009	Arrivals and Departures	Yes	Yes
2012	Transmission	Yes	Yes

Feature film

Year	Title	Director	Writer	Producer
2003	Waiting for Naval Base Lilly	Yes	Yes	Yes
2005	The Actress	Yes	Yes	Yes
2007	Plum Role	Yes	Yes	Yes
2010	The Toll	Yes	Yes	Yes
2013	These Final Hours	Yes	Yes	No
2017	1922	Yes	Yes	Executive
2019	Rattlesnake	Yes	Yes	Executive
2025	We Bury the Dead	Yes	Yes	No
