= Katie Says Goodbye =

2016 drama film

- Theatrical release poster
- Directed by: Wayne Roberts
- Written by: Wayne Roberts
- Produced by: Max Born; Kimberly Parker; F.A. Eric Schultz; Carlo Sirtori; Benjamin Steiner; David Steiner; Jacob Wasserman
- Starring: Olivia Cooke; Mireille Enos; Christopher Abbott; Mary Steenburgen; Jim Belushi; Keir Gilchrist; Chris Lowell
- Cinematography: Paula Huidobro
- Edited by: Sabine Emiliani; Carlo Sirtori
- Music by: Dan Romer
- Production companies: Parallell Cinéma; Relic Pictures
- Distributed by: Vertical Entertainment
- Release dates: September 11, 2016 (TIFF); June 7, 2019 (United States)
- Running time: 88 minutes
- Countries: United States; France
- Language: English

Katie Says Goodbye is a 2016 drama film written and directed by Wayne Roberts in his directorial debut. The film stars Olivia Cooke, Mireille Enos, Christopher Abbott, Mary Steenburgen, Jim Belushi, Keir Gilchrist and Chris Lowell.

The film had its world premiere at the Toronto International Film Festival. It was released on June 7, 2019, by Vertical Entertainment.

== Plot ==
Katie is a kindhearted seventeen-year-old waitress who lives in a hamlet in rural 1980s Arizona with her mother Tracey. Tracey doesn't work and depends on Katie to keep up with bills.

To overcome poverty, escape her boring life, and fulfill her plan to move to San Francisco, Katie makes extra money having sex with truckers, including another older man, Bear.

Katie befriends and begins a relationship with local mechanic and ex-convict Bruno. When he discovers she is prostituting herself, Katie agrees to stop. But Katie has a reputation in town, and soon another man forces himself on Katie. The man's daughter, Katie's coworker, comes upon the pair and later accuses Katie of being the seducer.

Katie is picked up by two of Bruno's coworkers under the guise of a ride home but is taken to a rural area where they beat and rape her. After his coworkers brag about having sex with her, Bruno, in a rage, assaults them, grievously wounding one.

Katie, bruised and despondent, returns to the restaurant, where Bear accuses Bruno of causing Katie's bruises. After a brief fight between the two men, Bruno drives Katie to another rural area where he blames her for having sex with his coworkers and ends their relationship. He is later arrested.

Meanwhile, Tracey leaves town with a married neighbor and Katie's money, without paying the rent. Katie is forced to abandon the trailer she shared with her mother.

Back at work, another waitress accuses Katie of stealing money from the restaurant. As grief, shock and despair wash across her face, Katie tells her boss the accusation is true. She refuses the restaurant owner's apparent offer to let Katie make amends to keep her job. As she walks out the door, Katie quietly warns the accusing waitress to "never do that again." Outside the restaurant, Katie staggers across the parking lot, and falls to her knees in heaving sobs. As the sobs taper off, a smile comes over her face, she picks herself up and shuffles out to the highway where she begins a new journey by holding her thumb out and hitchhiking down the road.

== Cast ==
- Olivia Cooke as Katie, a waitress and prostitute
- Mireille Enos as Tracey, Katie's mother
- Christopher Abbott as Bruno, a mechanic whom Katie has a relationship with
- Mary Steenburgen as Maybelle, Katie's boss at the diner
- Jim Belushi as Bear, a trucker and one of Katie's clients
- Keir Gilchrist as Matty, Bruno's co-worker
- Chris Lowell as Dirk, Bruno's co-worker
- Natasha Bassett as Sara
- Gene Jones as Mr. Willard

== Production ==
On March 23, 2015, it was announced that Olivia Cooke had been cast in the film in title role of Katie, alongside Mireille Enos as Katie's mother, and Christopher Abbott as Katie's love interest. Jim Belushi portrays one of Katie's clients, with Mary Steenburgen playing the role of the diner owner where Katie works. The script was written by Wayne Roberts, who also directed the feature; the film marks his directoral debut. The film was produced by Sean Durkin who directed Martha Marcy May Marlene, and was executive produced by Antonio Campos and Josh Mond. Roberts was inspired to direct the film after Campos and Durkin suggested he should. Dan Romer composed the film's score.

Principal photography began in March 2015 in New Mexico. and concluded on April 30, 2015.

== Release ==
In August 2016, the first image of Cooke was released. The film had its world premiere at the Toronto International Film Festival. It was released on June 7, 2019, by Vertical Entertainment.

== Critical reception ==
On review aggregator website Rotten Tomatoes, the film received a critic approval rating of 45%, based on 20 reviews, with an average rating of 5/10.
