= These Final Hours =

2013 thriller film by Zak Hilditch

- Theatrical release poster
- Directed by: Zak Hilditch
- Written by: Zak Hilditch
- Produced by: Liz Kearney
- Starring: Nathan Phillips; Angourie Rice; Jessica De Gouw; Daniel Henshall; Kathryn Beck; Sarah Snook; Lynette Curran
- Cinematography: Bonnie Elliott
- Edited by: Nick Meyers
- Music by: Cornel Wilczek
- Production companies: 8th in Line; XYZ Films
- Distributed by: Roadshow Films
- Release dates: 2 August 2013 (Melbourne IFF); 31 July 2014 (Australia)
- Running time: 87 minutes
- Country: Australia
- Language: English
- Budget: $2.5 million
- Box office: $360,234 (Australia)

These Final Hours is a 2013 Australian sci-fi apocalyptic thriller film written and directed by Zak Hilditch and starring Nathan Phillips and Angourie Rice in her film debut. It premiered at the Melbourne International Film Festival in August 2013 and had limited cinema release on 31 July 2014.

== Plot ==
After an asteroid has collided with Earth in the North Atlantic, only twelve hours remain until the subsequent global firestorm reaches Perth, Western Australia. James and his lover, Zoe, are having sex for the last time at her beach house, where she reveals that she is pregnant with James' child. Wishing to block out all feelings and avoid what's coming, James berates Zoe for sharing her news and leaves for "the party to end all parties".

After having his car stolen, he comes across two men who have kidnapped a young girl and are planning to rape her. James kills them and rescues the girl. The girl, named Rose, explains that she was separated from her father in Malaga en route to her aunt's house in Roleystone. Without enough petrol and wishing to get to his party, James plans to leave Rose with his sister and her children. Upon arriving, he finds his sister and her husband dead in the shower and three crosses marking what appear to be his nieces' graves in what is an apparent murder suicide.

Other attempts at locating Rose's dad or someone to leave her with have sobering results, and James eventually heads to the party with Rose in tow. The party is overflowing with people, a game of Russian roulette is being played, and an orgy is going on inside the house. Rose is noticeably uncomfortable and appears to want to leave. James meets with the host of the party, Freddy, whose sister is James' girlfriend, Vicki. James leaves Rose in the pool to speak with Vicki. In a reversal of the earlier scene with Zoe, James attempts to share a serious moment with Vicki, only for her to berate him for bringing her down with his news.

Vicki shows James a bunker built underneath Freddy's garage, which obviously does not have sufficient food, protection, or space for the miraculous survival Vicki envisions. James tells Vicki and Freddy that they will all die, even with the bunker. Freddy's reaction to this statement informs Vicki that her brother had known this all along. James accepts that his death is inevitable and cannot be blocked out, and commits himself to reuniting Rose with her family.

Meanwhile, outside, a drug-affected woman follows Rose, claiming that she is her daughter, Mandy. When James finally comes back outside to find Rose, she is hallucinating and vomiting after being coerced into taking an ecstasy pill, with the woman leaning over her. James tries to leave the party with Rose, causing the woman to scream that he is kidnapping her child. Freddy holds James at gunpoint, before Vicki calmly takes the gun and shoots the woman, telling James to go.

James drives Rose to his estranged mother's house, with whom he reconciles while Rose recovers. She gives James petrol and Rose some old clothes, and the pair leave for Rose's aunt's house. Upon arrival, nobody seems to be home, but James finds the bodies of Rose's family, including her father, outside in what seems to be a mass suicide. Although hysterical at the news of her father's death, Rose insists on seeing him. James comforts her and brings her his body, and they lay him by a pond with flowers as she tells him that her dad wanted them to be together for the end. James then confides in Rose about his relationship with Zoe and her pregnancy, which leads him to realise his love for her. Rose convinces him to make amends with her while he still can. He heeds her advice, and the two share an emotional farewell before James leaves. His car overheats on the highway as the firestorm approaches, and he runs the rest of the way. He finds Zoe on the beach, watching the approaching firestorm. She is initially hostile towards James, but the two quickly reconcile and confess their mutual love. The pair then embrace, and turn towards the ocean as they are consumed by the firestorm.

== Cast ==
- Nathan Phillips as James
- Angourie Rice as Rose
- Jessica De Gouw as Zoe
- Kathryn Beck as Vicki
- Daniel Henshall as Freddy
- Sarah Snook as Mandy's mother
- Lynette Curran as James' mother
- David Field as Radio Man

== Production ==
The budget for the film was A$2.5 million.

Bonnie Elliott was responsible for cinematography.

The film was marketed via a website that contained a countdown to the meteor impact depicted in the film, with simulated press conference videos and social media conversations.

== Release ==
The film was screened on 2 August 2013 at the Melbourne International Film Festival in its Australian and world premiere. It was selected to be screened as part of the Directors' Fortnight section of the 2014 Cannes Film Festival in May 2014.

These Final Hours opened in a limited release across Australia on 31 July 2014.

== Reception ==
=== Box office ===
These Final Hours grossed $360,234 throughout its entire theatrical run.

=== Critical reception ===
Rotten Tomatoes, a review aggregator, reports that 85% of 59 surveyed critics gave the film a positive review; the average rating is 7.00/10. The critical consensus states: "Writer-director Zak Hilditch's thought-provoking screenplay – and a stellar performance from young Angourie Rice -- make These Final Hours worth watching, even if its end-of-the-world premise is overly familiar." Metacritic rated the film 61 out of 100 based on 9 critics, indicating "generally favorable reviews".

== Possible remake ==
In 2015, it was announced that EuropaCorp was planning an American remake, in which Hilditch would return to write, direct, and produce.
