= Big Driver =

2010 novella by Stephen King

- Author: Stephen King
- Language: English
- Genre: Suspense
- Published in: Full Dark, No Stars
- Publisher: Scribner
- Publication date: 2010
- Publication place: United States
- Media type: Hardcover

Big Driver is a novella by American writer Stephen King, published in his collection Full Dark, No Stars (2010). An excerpt was published in the November 12, 2010 issue of Entertainment Weekly.

== Synopsis ==
Tess is a cozy mystery writer who has a speaking engagement at a library in Chicopee, Massachusetts. After the event, the librarian who had invited her, Ramona Norville, tells Tess to avoid Interstate 84. She gives Tess the directions to Stagg Road, a presumably safer shortcut to Tess' home in Connecticut. However, on the shortcut, Tess' Ford Expedition rolls over nail-studded pieces of wood which lie across the road, giving her a flat tire. The incident happens near an abandoned Esso gas station.

Shortly afterwards, a tall man in a pickup truck offers to assist Tess and change her tire. At first he seems to be eager to help, but Tess soon realizes that he had set out the road hazard as a trap. The trucker knocks Tess out and proceeds to beat her and rape her several times, before finally choking her to unconsciousness. Tess later wakes up but feigns death as he stashes her body in a culvert and drives away. She escapes, but not before discovering the corpses of two other women, all victims of the same culprit, dead and in various states of decomposition in the culvert. Tess attempts to find some help but worries that the attack will create a scandal that will negatively affect her career. She resolved to not tell anyone about the assault.

The next day, while recovering her Expedition at a bar called the Stagger Inn, Tess speaks with an employee named Betsy. Tess fabricates a story about her injuries and tells Betsy a man helped her, taking the opportunity to fish for details about her rapist. Betsy identifies the man as "Big Driver". Tess decides to use the detective skills she acquired while writing her novels to find him.

Tess discovers that Big Driver's mother is Ramona, deducing that she intentionally directed her into the trap. Tess goes to Ramona's home and, after confirming that she was indeed guilty of intentionally directing Tess into the trap, kills her. Tess then finds Big Driver's address and goes to his house. She lies in wait and shoots him after he arrives home. It is only after he is dead that Tess determines that the man she just killed, Big Driver, was not the man who raped her; he was the older, even taller, brother of the man who raped her, "Little Driver". Stunned, Tess nevertheless drives to Little Driver's house and kills him too.

Unsure of Big Driver's involvement in her rape, and overcome with guilt over possibly having murdered an innocent man, she writes out a confession and prepares to kill herself. At the last moment, however, she decides to go back to Big Driver's house to look for evidence. There she finds the purse taken from her the night of the rape, confirming Big Driver's complicity in the crime. Tess comes to terms with her sins and goes home, finally beginning to feel peace.

== Adaptation ==
Big Driver was made into a Lifetime TV movie that was aired on Lifetime on October 18, 2014.

== See also ==
- Stephen King short fiction bibliography
