= 1922 (novella) =

Novella by Stephen King

- Paperback issue
- Author: Stephen King
- Language: English
- Genre: Horror
- Published in: Full Dark, No Stars
- Publisher: Scribner
- Publication date: 2010
- Publication place: United States
- Pages: 129

1922 is a novella by American writer Stephen King, originally published in his collection Full Dark, No Stars (2010), and then as a stand-alone publication in 2017.

== Synopsis ==
In 1922, Wilfred James, a farmer in Hemingford Home, Nebraska, owns 80 acres of farmland that have been in his family for generations. His wife, Arlette, owns an adjoining 100 acres willed to her by her father. Wilfred scorns the thought of living in a city, but Arlette is discontented with farm life and wants to move to Omaha. She seeks to sell her land to a livestock company for use as a pig farm and slaughterhouse. If she does so, Wilfred's property will no longer be farmable and he will be forced to sell as well. Wilfred resorts to manipulating his teenage son, Henry, into helping him murder Arlette.

As part of their plot, Wilfred and a reluctant Henry get Arlette drunk. Arlette proceeds to make crude remarks about Henry's girlfriend, Shannon Cotterie, which angers the boy enough to commit to Wilfred's plot. After taking Arlette to bed, Wilfred brutally slashes her throat with a butcher knife. Wilfred and Henry then dump the body in a dry well behind the barn. Later, as Wilfred dumps her suitcase into the well with Arlette, he notices that her body has become infested with rats.

Wilfred decides to fill in the well to hide the body, but knows that doing so will arouse suspicion. He purposefully has one of his aged cows fall into the well to provide a cover story for filling it in. Right afterwards, the local sheriff, acting on behalf of the livestock company, searches the farmhouse to look for Arlette, but finds nothing. Wilfred and Henry fill the well, but a rat crawls out of the soil. Henry kills it, believing that Arlette is now haunting them. Wilfred later encounters a rat when it attacks one of his other milk cows, severing one of her teats.

A few months later, Henry, who has become emotionally troubled since the murder, impregnates Shannon. The pregnancy sours the friendship between Wilfred and Shannon's father, Harlan, a neighboring farmer. Shannon is sent to a Catholic school for pregnant girls in Omaha, but Henry helps her escape. They begin a highly publicized career as a pair of Bonnie and Clyde-style bank robbers, becoming wanted in several states.

Wilfred is emotionally destitute in Henry's absence. He again encounters the rat from the barn, which bites his hand and causes it to become severely infected, necessitating its amputation. Soon after, Wilfred claims that Arlette's living corpse, which is accompanied by a large group of rats, leaves the confines of the well and enters the farmhouse, confronting him. Arlette gives him a detailed premonition of the demise of both Henry and the pregnant Shannon in Nevada. Soon afterwards, the roof of Wilfred's farmhouse caves in during a storm.

When Arlette's prophecy comes true, Wilfred tries to sell the land parcel he killed her for. However, Harlan, who is grieving Shannon's death and has been left by his wife, refuses to buy the land, and the local banker, who has dealt with the livestock company's lawyer, refuses to take it as well. Wilfred loses his farm and is forced to sell the land to the livestock company for a pittance. He moves to Omaha and spends the first two years visiting the scenes of Henry's crimes and drinking away the money he received from selling the land. He finds two jobs, the first as a garment factory worker and the second as a librarian. He quits both, he claims, when the rats begin to stalk him again.

Wilfred sits in a hotel room in Omaha, writing down his story and claiming that the corpses of Arlette, Henry, and Shannon are present. Wilfred plans to commit suicide before the rats consume him, but apparently misplaces his gun. The story ends with a newspaper clipping about Wilfred's death, stating that he was found with bite marks that appeared to be self-inflicted; this leaves the reader to speculate about whether Wilfred's account was true or delusional. Wilfred's papers are found to be illegible, having been chewed to pieces.

== Film ==
A film based on the novel was released on Netflix on October 20, 2017.

== See also ==
- Stephen King short fiction bibliography
