= A Good Marriage =

Novella by Stephen King

- Author: Stephen King
- Language: English
- Genre: Suspense
- Published in: Full Dark, No Stars
- Publisher: Scribner
- Publication date: 2010
- Publication place: United States
- Media type: Hardcover

A Good Marriage is a novella by American writer Stephen King, published in the collection Full Dark, No Stars (2010).

== Plot ==
Darcy Anderson has been married to Bob, an accountant from Portland, Maine, for 27 years. They have a happy yet humdrum relationship, running a mail order business selling and appraising rare coins. One day, while Bob is away on business, Darcy goes into the garage to search for batteries. When she rummages through Bob's belongings, she stumbles across a pornographic magazine showing sadomasochistic images. Unnerved by the magazine—and that it is in Bob's possession—Darcy finds a secret compartment behind the garage's baseboard and makes a more horrific discovery: a small box containing the ID cards of Marjorie Duvall, a victim of a serial killer called "Beadie".

Bob phones Darcy and senses her distress. Afterwards, Darcy looks up Beadie online and cross-checks Bob's business records with the locations of the murders, finding that Bob was close to most of the crimes. When Darcy wakes up the next morning, she finds that Bob has deduced her discovery and returned home early. He calmly explains his insanity to his horrified wife, recounting how he and a sadistic friend named Brian Delahanty—nicknamed "BD", from which "Beadie" was derived—planned a school shooting as teenagers. Delahanty was hit by a truck before they could carry it out, but Bob claims he had "infected" him with "certain ideas", resulting in his homicidal urges.

Bob claims that after he started his family with Darcy, his murderous alter ego receded and he was not driven to kill again for several years. He pleads with Darcy to put the matter behind them, for the sake of herself and their family. After mulling it over, Darcy feigns an agreement to do so, on the condition that he bury Duvall's ID cards deep in the woods. Bob believes Darcy has put the truth behind her; however, she is trying to think of a way to stop him from killing again. A few months after Darcy's discoveries, an elated Bob finds a rare 1955 doubled die cent, and the couple goes out to celebrate. When Bob becomes drunk from champagne, Darcy devises a plan to murder him.

Upon arriving home, Darcy has Bob fetch some Perrier while she waits for him upstairs, ostensibly for sex. However, when Bob arrives, Darcy pushes him down the stairs, breaking his arm, neck, and back. She then manages to shove a plastic bag and a dish cloth down his throat, killing him. After removing the evidence of murder, Darcy manages to convince the police and the children that Bob died in a drunken accident and is not suspected of committing any foul play. Darcy assumes the ordeal is over.

However, not long after Bob is buried, a retired detective named Holt Ramsey visits the house. Ramsey spent years investigating the Beadie murders and had questioned Bob. Ramsey tells Darcy that he suspected Bob was the killer, since his Chevrolet Suburban was seen in the vicinity of each victim. Darcy realizes that Ramsey has figured out her role in Bob's death. Once she admits the truth, Ramsey assures her that she "did the right thing" and leaves; before he does, she tells him about Delahanty. Darcy realizes that Bob was close to being caught and wasn't as smart as he thought he was and finds that she can now be at peace with herself.

== Background ==
In the afterword for Full Dark, No Stars, King stated that the character of Bob Anderson was inspired by Dennis Rader, the infamous "BTK Killer". Like Rader, Anderson gruesomely tortures and kills his victims, then mails his victims' identification to the police; Anderson's victims, like Rader's, are women and children. Also like Rader, Anderson is a pillar of the community who is well regarded by his friends and colleagues. King said that he felt inspired to write the story after the public outcry against Rader's wife, Paula, who had been married to him for 34 years yet seemed to have no knowledge of his crimes.

== Film adaptation ==
On May 19, 2012, it was announced that Will Battersby and Peter Askin were producing an adaptation of A Good Marriage with Askin directing Stephen King's screenplay of his own novella. On September 11, 2012, Joan Allen was announced as the lead in the film. Anthony LaPaglia and Stephen Lang were later added to the cast.

== Reception ==
Terrence Rafferty of The New York Times wrote, "King works the double motifs deftly and guides the narrative to a satisfyingly cathartic climax—after which he supplies a nifty denouement". Bill Sheehan of The Washington Post wrote, "Through his mastery of detail and his deceptively effortless narrative voice, King transforms this disquieting material into a disturbing, fascinating book." Tim Martin of The Daily Telegraph wrote that the story starts off with a familiar premise but ends "with some far more troubling and resonant points about justice and forgiveness". Doug Johnstone of The Independent called the story "King at his absolute best". Carol Memmott of USA Today called it the best story of the collection and wrote, "It's a grim reminder that you can never really know the people you love, and it's a warning about how the little things in life can be the tipping point toward a living nightmare."

In the wake of the novella and its subsequent film, Kerri Rawson, the daughter of Dennis Rader, spoke publicly, claiming that King had exploited both her family and her father's victims with the story.

== See also ==
- Stephen King short fiction bibliography
