= Beattie (surname) =

- Language: Irish Gaelic

Origin
- Meaning: Diminutive of Bartholomew (patronymic); "one who held land on condition of supplying food to those billeted on him by the chief"; "public victualler"
- Region of origin: Scottish borders, Ireland

Other names
- Variant forms: Bate, Beatty, Beatey, Betagh, Betty, MacCaffrey, McCaffrey, MacVitty, MacWatty, MacWattie, Watson

Beattie is an Irish Gaelic (Biadhtach) and Scottish surname, meaning the hospitaller or "one who held land on condition of supplying food to those billeted on him by the chief"; "public victualler". The surname Beattie is of Irish origin and comes from the Gaelic name MacBhiadha and is most common in County Tyrone.

People with the surname include:

- A. L. Beattie (1852–1920), pioneering Chief Mechanical Engineer of the New Zealand Railways Department
- Andrew Beattie (politician) (1860–1923), Irish politician.
- Ann Beattie (born 1947), American writer
- Anthony Beattie (1944–2014), British civil servant
- Bob Beattie (disambiguation), several people
- Bobby Beattie (1916–2002), Scottish footballer
- Brittany Beattie (born 1994), Australian model
- Catherine Beattie (politician) (1921–2014), American farmer and politician
- Charles Beattie (1899–1958), Northern Irish farmer and briefly Member of Parliament
- Charlton Beattie (1869–1925), United States District Court judge
- Chris Beattie (born 1975), Australian rugby league footballer
- Craig Beattie (born 1984), Scottish footballer
- Daryl Beattie (born 1970), Australian motorcycle racer
- Dick Beattie (1936–1990), Scottish footballer
- Dud Beattie (1934–2016), Australian rugby league footballer
- Frank Beattie, (1933–2009), Scottish association football player and manager
- George Beattie (disambiguation), several people
- Hanna Beattie (born 1995), American ice hockey forward
- Henry Clay Beattie Jr. (1884–1911), American criminal
- James Beattie (disambiguation), several people
- Jen Beattie (born 1991), Scottish association footballer, sister of Johnnie
- John Beattie (disambiguation), several people
- Johnnie Beattie, (born 1985), Scottish rugby union player
- Johnny Beattie (1926–2020), Scottish actor, father of Maureen
- Joseph Beattie (born 1978), English actor
- Joseph Hamilton Beattie (1808–1871), locomotive engineer, London and South Western Railway
- Kevin Beattie (1953–2018), English footballer
- Kim Beattie (born 1998), British gymnast
- Lane Beattie (born 1951), American politician
- Mary Beattie (1923–2015), American politician
- Maureen Beattie (born 1953), Scottish actress
- Melody Beattie (1948–2025), American author of self-help books
- Peter Beattie (born 1952), Premier of Queensland (1998–2007)
- Robert Beattie (writer) (fl. 2000s), American lawyer
- Robert Ethelbert Beattie (1875–1925), Canadian politician
- Robert M. Beattie (born 1962), English gastroenterologist
- Rod Beattie (born 1948), Canadian actor
- Rod Beattie (born 1959), American swimwear designer
- Ron Beattie (1932 - 2021) American singer and actor.
- Rolla Kent Beattie (1875–1960), American botanist and plant pathologist
- Simon Beattie (born 1975), antiquarian bookseller
- Stephen Beattie (1908–1975), Royal Navy Lieutenant-Commander during the Second World War, winner of the Victoria Cross
- Taylor Beattie (1837–1920), Louisiana politician and judge
- Wendy Beattie (born 1980), Australian field hockey player
- William Beattie (physician) (1793–1876), Scottish physician and poet
- William Francis Beattie (1886–1918), Scottish sculptor
- William George Beattie (1841–1918), son of Joseph Hamilton Beattie, also locomotive engineer for the London and South Western Railway

== See also ==
- Beatie, given name and surname
- Beatty (surname)
- Batey (surname)
