= William Beattie =

William Beattie may refer to:

- William Beattie (physician) (1793–1875), Scottish physician and poet
- William Beattie (politician) (1942–2025), Northern Irish minister and Unionist politician
- Bill Beattie (Australian politician) (1912–2006), Australian politician
- Billy Beattie (William Lindsay Beattie, c. 1889–1917), Scottish rugby league footballer of the 1910s
- William George Beattie (1841–1918), English locomotive engineer
- William John Beattie (born 1941/2), founder and former leader of the Canadian Nazi Party
- William Hamilton Beattie (1842–1898), Scottish architect
- William Francis Beattie (1886–1918), Scottish sculptor
- William Beattie (photographer) (1864–1931), New Zealand photographer
- Bill Beattie (photographer) (1902–1991), New Zealand photographer

== See also ==
- William Beatty (disambiguation)
