= Vince Lombardi =

American football coach (1913–1970)

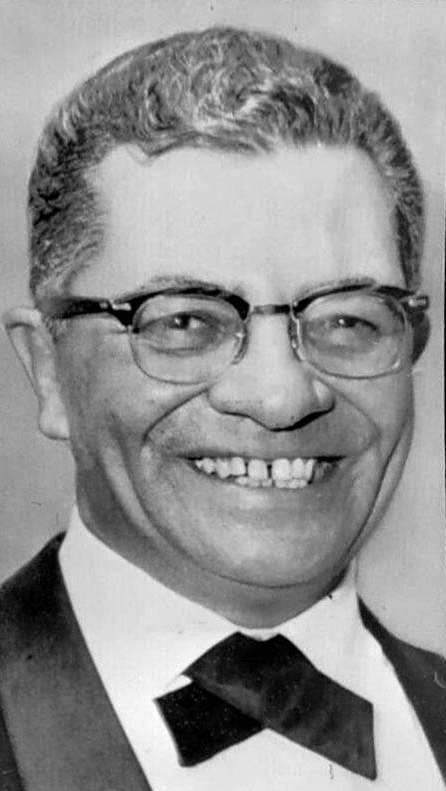
- Lombardi in 1964

Personal information
- Born: June 11, 1913; Brooklyn, New York, U.S.
- Died: September 3, 1970 (aged 57); Washington, D.C., U.S.

Career information
- High school: St. Francis Prep (Brooklyn, New York)
- College: Fordham
- NFL draft: 1937: undrafted

Career history

Playing
- Wilmington Clippers (1937); Brooklyn Eagles (1938)

Coaching
- Salesianum School (1937) Assistant; St. Cecilia HS (NJ) (1939–1941) Assistant; St. Cecilia HS (NJ) (1942–1946) Head coach; Fordham (1947–1948) Assistant; Army (1949–1953) Assistant; New York Giants (1954–1958) Offensive coordinator; Green Bay Packers (1959–1967) Head coach & general manager; Green Bay Packers (1968) General manager; Washington Redskins (1969) Head coach & executive vice president

Awards and highlights
- 2× Super Bowl champion (I, II); 5× NFL champion (1961, 1962, 1965, 1966, 1967); 2× NFL Coach of the Year (1959, 1961); NFL 100th Anniversary All-Time Team; NFF Distinguished American Award (1970); Green Bay Packers Hall of Fame; Washington Redskins Ring of Fame

Career NFL statistics
- Win–loss record: 96–34–6
- Winning percentage: 73.8%
- Playoff record: 9–1
- Overall record: 105–35–6
- Coaching profile at Pro Football Reference
- Executive profile at Pro Football Reference
- Pro Football Hall of Fame

Vincent Thomas Lombardi (/ləmˈbɑːrdi/ ləm-BAR-dee; June 11, 1913 – September 3, 1970) was an American professional football coach and executive in the National Football League (NFL). Lombardi is considered by many to be among the greatest coaches and leaders in American sports. He is best known as the head coach of the Green Bay Packers during the 1960s, where he led the team to three straight and five total NFL Championships in seven years, in addition to winning the first two Super Bowls at the conclusion of the 1966 and 1967 NFL seasons.

Lombardi began his coaching career as an assistant and later as head coach at St. Cecilia High School in Englewood, New Jersey. He was assistant coach at Fordham University where he coached with Jim Lansing. He also coached for the United States Military Academy and the New York Giants before serving as head coach and general manager for the Packers from 1959 to 1967 and the Washington Redskins from 1969 until dying from cancer during the 1970 preseason.

Lombardi never had a losing season as head coach in the NFL, compiling a regular-season winning percentage of 73.8% (96–34–6) and 90% (9–1) in the postseason for an overall record of 105 wins, 35 losses and 6 ties in the NFL. He was enshrined in the Pro Football Hall of Fame, and the NFL Super Bowl trophy was named in his honor.

== Early life ==
Lombardi was born on June 11, 1913, in the Sheepshead Bay neighborhood of Brooklyn to Enrico "Harry" Lombardi (1889–1971) and Matilda "Mattie" Izzo (1891–1972), both from Southern Italy. Harry's mother and father, Vincenzo and Michelina, emigrated from Salerno, Italy. Mattie's father and mother, Anthony and Loretta, emigrated from Vietri di Potenza, Basilicata. Harry had three siblings and Matilda had twelve. Vince was the oldest of five children, including Madeleine, Harold, Claire and Joe. Both the Lombardi and Izzo clans settled entirely in Sheepshead Bay.

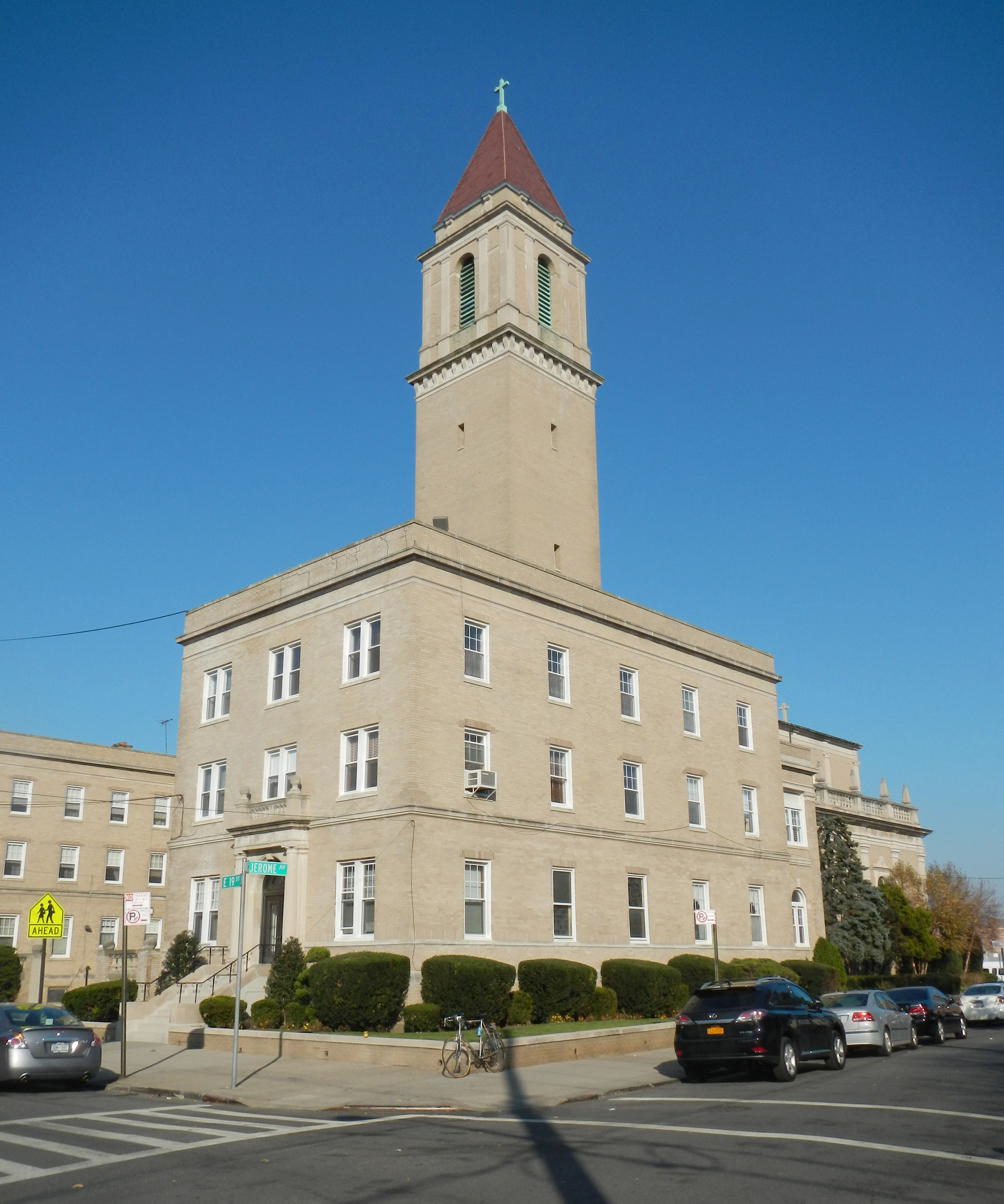
St. Mark Catholic Church, where Lombardi served as an altar boy in his childhood

Anthony opened up a barber shop in Sheepshead Bay before the turn of the century. At about the time of Lombardi's birth, Harry and his brother, Eddie, opened a butcher shop in the Meatpacking District of Manhattan. Throughout the Great Depression, Harry's shop did well and his family prospered. Lombardi grew up in an ethnically diverse, middle-class neighborhood.

Church attendance was mandatory for the Lombardis on Sundays. Mass would be followed with an equally compulsory few hours of dinner with extended family members, friends and local clergy. Lombardi himself was an altar boy at St. Mark Catholic Church. Outside their local neighborhood, the Lombardi children were subject to the rampant ethnic discrimination that existed at the time against Italian immigrants and their descendants. As a child, Lombardi helped his father at his meat cutting business, but grew to hate it. At the age of 12 he started playing in an uncoached but organized football league in Sheepshead Bay.

=== High school ===
Lombardi graduated from the eighth grade at age 15 in 1928. (Note: O'Brien incorrectly implies he graduated in 1929 from eighth grade which is completely refuted by Maraniss and O'Brien's date of 1928 makes no sense. O'Brien, on page 28, writes he left after three years there when he left after four.) He then enrolled in the Cathedral Preparatory Seminary, a division of Cathedral College of the Immaculate Conception in Brooklyn, a six-year secondary program to become a Catholic priest. At Cathedral, he played on the school's baseball and basketball teams, but his performance was hindered by his poor athleticism and eyesight. Against school rules, he continued to play football off-campus throughout his studies at Cathedral. After completing four years at Cathedral he decided not to pursue the priesthood. He enrolled at St. Francis Preparatory high school for the fall of 1932. (Note: His stint at seminary school would cost him one year of his academic life as he would be, generally speaking, repeating his senior year of high school in order to obtain a high school diploma.) There he became a Charter Member of Omega Gamma Delta fraternity. His performance as a fullback on the Terriers' football team earned him a position on the virtual All-City football team.

=== Fordham University ===
In 1933, Lombardi received a football scholarship to Fordham University in the Bronx to play for the Fordham Rams and Coach Jim Crowley, who was one of the Four Horsemen of Notre Dame in the 1920s. During his freshman year, Lombardi proved to be an aggressive and spirited player on the football field. Prior to the beginning of his sophomore year, Lombardi was projected to start games at the tackle position. Lombardi was only 5'8" and about 180 pounds and was classified as undersized for the position.

In his senior year of 1936, he was the right guard in the Seven Blocks of Granite, a nickname given by a Fordham University publicist to the Fordham University football team's offensive front line. (Note: The Seven Blocks of Granite of the 1936 line were Leo Paquin, Johnny 'Tarzan' Druze, Alex Franklin Wojciechowicz, Ed 'Devil Doll' Franco, Al 'Ali Baba' Babartsky, Natty Pierce, and Vince Lombardi.) In a game against Pitt, he suffered a severe gash inside his mouth and had several teeth knocked out. He missed most of the remainder of the game, until he was called in on defense for a successful goal-line stand that preserved a scoreless tie. The Rams were 5–0–2 before losing in the final game of the season, 7–6, to NYU. The loss destroyed all hopes of Fordham playing in the Rose Bowl and taught Lombardi a lesson he would never forget — to never underestimate your opponent.

=== Early career ===
Lombardi graduated from Fordham University on June 16, 1937. The nation was still plagued by the Great Depression, so there were few career opportunities for the young Lombardi and for the next two years, he showed no discernible career path or ambition. He tried to play semi-professional football with the Wilmington Clippers of the American Association and worked as a debt collector for a collection agency, but those efforts very quickly proved to be failures. With his father's strong support, he enrolled in Fordham Law School in September 1938. Although he did not fail any classes, he believed his grades were so poor that he dropped out after one semester. Later in life, he would explain to others that he was close to graduating, but his desire to start and support a family forced him to leave law school and get a job. He also joined the Brooklyn Eagles.

== Coaching career ==
=== St. Cecilia High School ===
In 1939, Lombardi wanted to marry his girlfriend, Marie Planitz, but he deferred at his father's insistence because he needed a steady job to support himself and a family; he married Marie the following year. In 1939, Lombardi accepted an assistant coaching job at St. Cecilia, a Catholic high school in Englewood, New Jersey. He was offered the position by the school's new head coach, Lombardi's former Fordham teammate, quarterback Andy Palau. Palau had just inherited the head coaching position from another Fordham teammate, Nat Pierce (left guard), who had accepted an assistant coach's job back at Fordham. In addition to coaching, Lombardi, age 26, taught Latin, chemistry, and physics for an annual salary of under $1,000. (Note: Maraniss 1999 lists his starting salary as $1,700, pg. 70, and O'Brien 1987 lists it as $1,000, pg. 51. Wiebusch's source is a quote from Father Tim Moore.)

In 1942, Andy Palau left St. Cecilia's for another position at Fordham, and Lombardi became the head coach at St. Cecilia's. He stayed a total of eight years, five as head coach. In 1943, St. Cecilia's was recognized as the top high school football team in the nation, in large part because of their victory over Brooklyn Prep, a Jesuit school considered one of the best teams in the eastern United States. Brooklyn Prep that season was led by senior Joe Paterno, who, like Lombardi, was to rise to legendary status in football. Lombardi won six state private school championships (NJISAA - New Jersey Independent Schools Athletic Association), and became the president of the Bergen County Coaches' Association.

=== Fordham ===
In 1947, Lombardi became the coach of freshman teams in football and basketball at his alma mater, Fordham University. The following year, he was an assistant coach for the varsity football team under head coach Ed Danowski, but he was arguably the de facto head coach.

=== West Point ===
Following the 1948 season, Lombardi accepted an assistant coaching job at the U.S. Military Academy at West Point, a position that greatly influenced his future philosophy and system of coaching. He was offensive line coach under head coach Earl "Colonel Red" Blaik. "As integral as religion was to [Lombardi's] sense of self, it was not until he reached West Point and combined his spiritual discipline with Blaik's military discipline that his coaching persona began to take its mature form." Blaik's emphasis on execution became a trademark of Lombardi's coaching style. Lombardi coached at West Point for five seasons, with varying results. The 1949 and 1950 seasons were successful, but the 1951 and 1952 seasons were not, due to the aftermath of a cadet cheating scandal (a violation of the Cadet Honor Code) which was uncovered in spring 1951. By order of the Superintendent, 43 of the 45 members of the varsity football team were discharged from the academy as a result of the scandal. "Decades later, looking back on his rise, Lombardi came to regard ..." Blaik's decision not to resign "... as a pivotal moment in his [own] career" — it taught him perseverance. Blaik himself was and remains a highly controversial figure, in Army football and academic history. After the 1951 and 1952 seasons, not much was expected from the 1953 team as it had also lost six players due to academic misconduct. The 1953 team, however, did achieve a 7–1–1 record, as Lombardi had a bigger role than ever in coaching the team. Following these five seasons at Army, Lombardi accepted an assistant coaching position with the New York Giants.

=== New York Giants ===
At age 41 in 1954, Lombardi began his NFL career with the New York Giants. He accepted a job that later became known as the offensive coordinator position under new head coach Jim Lee Howell. The Giants had finished the previous season under 23-year coach Steve Owen with a 3–9 record. By his third season in 1956, Lombardi, along with the defensive coordinator, former All-Pro cornerback turned coach Tom Landry, turned the squad into a championship team, defeating the Chicago Bears 47–7 for the league title. "Howell readily acknowledged the talents of Lombardi and Landry, and joked self-deprecatingly, that his main function was to make sure the footballs had air in them." At points in his tenure as an assistant coach at West Point, and as an assistant coach with the Giants, Lombardi worried that he was unable to land a head coaching job due to prejudice against his Italian heritage, especially with respect to Southern colleges. Howell wrote numerous recommendations for Lombardi to aid him in obtaining a head coaching position. Lombardi applied for head coaching positions at Wake Forest, Notre Dame, and other universities and, in some cases, never received a reply. In New York, Lombardi introduced the strategy of rule blocking to the NFL. In rule blocking, the offensive lineman would block an area, and not necessarily a particular defensive player, as was the norm up to that time. The running back was then expected to run towards any hole that was created. Lombardi referred to this as running to daylight.

=== Green Bay Packers ===
==== 1959 ====
The Green Bay Packers, with six future Hall of Famers on the roster in 1958, (Note: The five future hall of famers were Forrest Gregg, Jim Taylor, Paul Hornung, Ray Nitschke, Bart Starr, and Jerry Kramer.) finished at 1–10–1 under head coach Ray McLean, the worst record in Packers history. The players were dispirited, the Packers shareholders were disheartened, and the Green Bay community was enraged. The angst in Green Bay extended to the NFL as a whole, as the financial viability and the very existence of the Packer franchise were in jeopardy. On February 2, 1959, following intense lobbying on Lombardi's behalf by Jack Vainisi, the team's personnel director, Lombardi accepted the position of head coach and general manager of the Packers. He demanded and gained full control over the football operations of the community-owned franchise, a level of authority no coach had held since the departure of team co-founder Curly Lambeau after the 1949 season. He left no doubt of this when he told the franchise's executive committee, "I want it understood that I am in complete command here."

Lombardi's assertion of "complete command" over the team applied to the players as well. For his first training camp, he instituted harsh regimens and demanded absolute dedication and effort from his players. The Packers immediately improved in 1959 to 7–5, winning as many games as they had won in the previous three seasons combined. Rookie head coach Lombardi was named Coach of the Year. The fans appreciated what Lombardi was trying to do and responded by purchasing all the tickets for every home game during the 1960 season. Every Packers home game—preseason, regular season and playoffs—has been sold out ever since then.

==== 1960–1966 ====
In Lombardi's second year in 1960, Green Bay won the NFL Western Conference for the first time since 1944. This victory, along with his well-known religious convictions, led the Green Bay community to anoint Lombardi with the nickname "The Pope". Lombardi led the Packers to the 1960 Championship Game against the Philadelphia Eagles. Before the championship game, Lombardi met with Wellington Mara and advised him that he would not take the Giants' head coaching job, which was initially offered after the end of the 1959 season. In the final play of the game, in a drive that would have won it, the Packers were stopped a few yards from the goal line. Lombardi had suffered his first and only championship game loss. After the game, and after the press corps had left the locker room, Lombardi told his team, "This will never happen again. You will never lose another championship." In later years as coach of the Packers, Lombardi made it a point to admonish his running backs that if they failed to score from one yard out, he would consider it a personal affront to him and he would seek retribution. He coached the Packers to win their next nine post-season games, a record streak not matched or broken until Bill Belichick won ten straight from 2002 to 2006 with New England. The Packers defeated the Giants for the NFL title in 1961 (37–0 in Green Bay) and 1962 (16–7 at Yankee Stadium), marking the first two of their five titles in Lombardi's seven years. After the 1962 championship victory, President John F. Kennedy called Lombardi and asked him if he would "come back to Army and coach again". Kennedy received Lombardi's tacit refusal of the request. His only other post-season loss occurred to the St. Louis Cardinals in the third-place Playoff Bowl after the 1964 season (officially classified as an exhibition game).

Including postseason but excluding exhibition games, Lombardi compiled a 105–35–6 (.740) record as head coach, and never suffered a losing season. He led the Packers to three consecutive NFL championships — in 1965, 1966, and 1967 — a feat accomplished only once before in the history of the league, by Curly Lambeau, co-founder of the Packers, who coached the team to their first three straight NFL Championships in 1929, 1930, and 1931. At the conclusion of the 1966 and 1967 seasons, Lombardi's Packers won the first two Super Bowls, for championships in five of seven seasons.

During his tenure in Green Bay, Lombardi had considerable authority over off-the-field matters. For instance, he effectively blocked the American Football League's attempt to place an expansion team in Milwaukee by invoking the Packers' exclusive lease at Milwaukee County Stadium. He also effectively vetoed the rival league's plans for a 1966 exhibition game in Milwaukee. Businessman Marvin Fishman had asked county officials for permission to use the stadium. However, county officials replied that Fishman had to get approval from Lombardi, and Lombardi wasn't willing to go along. In his capacity as general manager, Lombardi represented the Packers at league meetings and exercised the team's voting rights.

==== Packers Sweep ====
As coach of the Packers, Lombardi converted Notre Dame quarterback and Heisman Trophy winner Paul Hornung to a full-time halfback. Lombardi also designed a play for fullback Jim Taylor: both guards, Jerry Kramer and Fuzzy Thurston, pulled to the outside and blocked downfield while Taylor would "run to daylight" — i.e., wherever the defenders weren't. This was a play that he had originally developed with the Giants for Frank Gifford. It soon became known as the Packers sweep (or Lombardi sweep), though Lombardi openly admitted it was based on an old single wing concept.

===== Ice Bowl =====
In 1967, Lombardi's Packers hosted the Dallas Cowboys in Green Bay on December 31 in the NFL Championship Game, a rematch of the previous season. This became known as the "Ice Bowl" because of the −13 °F (−25 °C) game-time temperature. Lombardi had a heating coil underneath the field but on this day it was not functioning. Some people believe that he turned it off on purpose. With 16 seconds left in the game and down by three points, the Packers called their final time-out. It was 3rd and goal on the Dallas two-foot line. In the huddle, with the game on the line, quarterback Bart Starr asked Kramer whether he could get enough traction on the icy turf for a wedge play and Kramer responded with an unequivocal yes. Starr came over to Lombardi on the sidelines to discuss the last play and told him he wanted to run a 31 wedge, but with him keeping the ball. Lombardi, having had enough of the bitter cold, told Starr to 'Run it! And let's get the hell out of here!' Lombardi was asked by Pat Peppler what play Starr would call, to which Lombardi replied, 'Damned if I know.' Starr returned to the huddle and called a Brown right 31 Wedge, but with him keeping the ball. Kramer blocked Jethro Pugh low and Ken Bowman hit Pugh high as Starr followed them into the end zone for the Packer lead and gained victory. Shortly after the victory in Super Bowl II, Lombardi resigned as head coach of the Packers on February 1, 1968, continuing as general manager. He handed the head coaching position to Phil Bengtson, a longtime assistant, but the Packers finished at 6–7–1 in the 1968 season and were out of the four-team NFL playoffs.

=== Washington Redskins ===
In February 1969, Lombardi was let out of his contract with the Packers to become the head coach and executive vice president of the Washington Redskins. As with the Packers, Lombardi was given full control over football operations. He also bought a 5% stake in the team. The Redskins finished the 1969 season at 7–5–2, their first winning record since 1955, but Lombardi died shortly before the start of the 1970 season. Lombardi was credited with having changed the culture and laying the foundation for Washington's success in the 1970s under George Allen.

== Personal life ==
=== Family ===
In 1934, Lombardi's roommate Jim Lawlor introduced him to his cousin's relative, Marie Planitz. When Marie announced her ardent desire to marry Lombardi, her status-conscious stockbroker father did not like the idea of his daughter marrying the son of an Italian butcher from Brooklyn. This was a prejudice Lombardi would face more than once in his life. Lombardi and Marie wed on August 31, 1940.

He seemed preoccupied with football even on their honeymoon, and cut it short to get back to Englewood ... "I wasn't married to him more than one week", she later related, "when I said to myself, Marie Planitz, you've made the greatest mistake of your life."

Marie's first pregnancy resulted in a miscarriage. This had a terrible effect on Marie and caused her to turn to heavy drinking, a problem she would deal with throughout her life. Their son, Vincent Henry Lombardi (Vince Jr.), was born in 1942 and their daughter Susan followed five years later in 1947.

Lombardi's perfectionism, authoritarian nature, and temper required Marie to learn to defend herself when Lombardi verbally abused her. His children were not immune from his yelling. When Lombardi had not lost his temper, he would often be reticent and aloof.

Lombardi's grandson, Joe Lombardi, has served as an assistant coach in the NFL since 2006. Joe was the offensive coordinator for the Denver Broncos from 2023-2026.

=== World War II deferments ===
Though he was 28 years old when the United States entered World War II, Lombardi did not serve in the war. He obtained a series of deferments: his first was a 2-A due to his teaching occupation; in 1943, he obtained a second deferment due to parenthood (3-A); and his final deferment was labelled a 4-A (age) and given in April 1944.

=== Religion ===
The three constants throughout Lombardi's life were his Roman Catholic religion, his family, and football. His father was a daily Communicant throughout his life and his mother's favorite picture of Vince as a child was on his Confirmation. When Lombardi was 12, while serving as an altar boy on Easter Sunday, "... amid the color and pageantry scarlet and white vestments, golden cross, scepters, the wafers and wine, body and blood ... the inspiration came to him that he should become a priest ...",. When his mother, Mattie, got wind of it she bragged about her son's plan to her neighbors. Lombardi attended Mass on a daily basis throughout his life.

During his tenure at St. Cecilia, Lombardi attended Mass every day and "prayed for calm and control: of his temper and ... his wife's drinking". When Lombardi became head coach of football in 1942, he led his team to Sunday Mass before each home game. At St. Cecilia, Lombardi shared an office with Father Tim Moore wherein it was not unusual for Lombardi to interrupt a conversation and request to go to Confession and for which Father Tim obliged him right in the office.

During his stay at Green Bay, Lombardi once emerged from his office and appeared before his secretary, Ruth McKloskey, wearing "... all these priest robes on, and he had a miter with a tassel, everything". Each day on his way to work for the Green Bay Packers, Lombardi would stop at St. Willebrord Church and "offer a prayer in case of unexpected death: 'My God, if I am to die today, or suddenly at any time, I wish to receive this Communion as my viaticum ... '". He regularly attended Sunday Mass at Resurrection Church in the Allouez neighborhood of Green Bay's southeast side, always sitting with his wife in the middle of the ninth pew.

On the morning of the dedication of Lombardi Avenue, Lombardi remarked to his 37-member entourage that he was pleased to have gotten them all up to attend morning Mass. Lombardi was a Fourth Degree in the Knights of Columbus.

=== Anti-discrimination philosophy ===
Vince Lombardi brought him (Bobby Mitchell) into the front office (in 1969), and he started doing scouting. They wanted the black guys to only scout the black schools, and Lombardi said, "No. Bobby's going to scout ALL the schools, not just the black ones."

— Brig Owens

In 1960, a color barrier still existed on at least one team in the NFL, but Jack Vainisi, the Scouting Director for the Packers, and Lombardi were determined "to ignore the prejudices then prevalent in most NFL front offices in their search for the most talented players". Lombardi explained his views by saying that he "... viewed his players as neither black nor white, but Packer green".

Among professional football head coaches, in the midst of the civil rights movement, Lombardi's anti-discrimination views were unusual. When Lombardi joined the Packers, they only had one black player, Nate Borden. During his time as coach the team became fully integrated: by 1967 they had 13 black players, including All-Pros Willie Davis, Willie Wood, Dave Robinson, Herb Adderley and Bob Jeter.

During his first training camp in Green Bay, Lombardi was notified by Packer veterans that an interracial relationship existed between one of the Packer rookies and a young woman. The next day at training camp, Lombardi—who was vehemently opposed to Jim Crow discrimination and had a zero-tolerance policy towards racism—responded by warning his team that if any player exhibited prejudice in any manner, that specific player would be thrown off the team.

Lombardi let it be known to all Green Bay establishments that if they did not accommodate his black and white players equally well, then that business would be off-limits to the entire team. Before the start of the 1960 regular season, he instituted a policy that the Packers would only lodge in places that accepted all his players. Lombardi also refused to assign hotel rooms to players based on their race: by 1967 the Packers were the only NFL team with such a policy.

Lombardi was a member of the all-white Oneida Golf and Riding Country Club in Green Bay, and he demanded that he should be allowed to choose a Native American caddie, even if white caddies were available. Lombardi's view on racial matters was a result of his religious faith and the ethnic prejudice that he had experienced as an Italian-American.

While with the Redskins in 1969, at Lombardi's insistence and with the support of then-minority owner Jack Kent Cooke, Hall of Fame wide receiver Bobby Mitchell joined the Redskins' front office, becoming the first African American to work in an NFL front office, and eventually becoming the NFL's first African American executive, working his way up to assistant general manager in 1981.

One Packer famously said that Lombardi "treats us all the same – like dogs." To the coach, there were no gay dogs or straight dogs; there were just Packers who had one goal: to play their best and win.

— Jim Buzinski, Outsports.com co-founder

Lombardi was known to be volatile and terse with players during practices and games, and he insisted on unconditional respect for everyone in his organization. Lombardi demanded acceptance from players and coaches toward all people and was noted for his stance against homophobia. According to Lombardi biographer and Pulitzer Prize–winning writer David Maraniss, if he caught a coach "discriminating against a player thought to be gay, he'd be fired". Richard Nicholls, the lifelong partner of Lombardi's younger brother, Hal, stated, "Vin was always fair in how he treated everybody ... a great man who accepted people at face value for what they were, and didn't judge anybody. He just wanted you to do the job."

In Washington, Lombardi's assistant general manager David Slatterly was gay, as was PR director Joe Blair, who was described as Lombardi's "right-hand man". According to his son Vince Lombardi Jr., "He saw everyone as equals, and I think having a gay brother (Hal) was a big factor in his approach ... I think my father would've felt, 'I hope I've created an atmosphere in the locker room where this would not be an issue at all. And if you do have an issue, the problem will be yours because my locker room will tolerate nothing but acceptance.'"

Upon his arrival in Washington, Lombardi was aware of tight end Jerry Smith's sexual orientation. "Lombardi protected and loved Jerry," said former teammate Dave Kopay. Lombardi brought Smith into his office and told him that his sexual orientation would never be an issue as long as he was coaching the Redskins; Smith would be judged solely on his on-the-field performance and contribution to the team's success. Under Lombardi's leadership Smith flourished, becoming an integral part of Lombardi's offense, and was voted a First Team All-Pro for the first time in his career, which was also Lombardi's only season as the Redskins head coach.

Lombardi invited other gay players to training camp and would privately hope they would prove they could earn a spot on the team. In Lombardi's first season with the Washington Redskins, he took interest in Ray McDonald, a gay running back recruited to the team in 1967. McDonald had been handpicked by owner Edward Bennet Williams, but was a disappointment in his rookie year and spent most of the 1968 season on the bench with an injury. Lombardi told running back coach, George Dickson, 'I want you to get on McDonald and work on him and work on him – and if I hear one of you people make reference to his manhood, you'll be out of here before your ass hits the ground.'

=== Politics ===
Although his wife was a Republican, Lombardi was a lifelong Democrat with liberal views on civil rights: he supported John F. Kennedy in the 1960 presidential election, Robert F. Kennedy in the 1968 primaries, and was also a supporter of Wisconsin Senator Gaylord Nelson. Despite this, during the 1960s he became uncomfortable with the burgeoning youth protest movements associated with the emerging counterculture, such as the New Left and the anti-war movement. In a speech that he first delivered in February 1967 to the American Management Association, he suggested that "everything has been done to strengthen the rights of the individual and at the same time weaken the rights of the church, weaken the rights of the state, and weaken the rights of all authority". Due to Lombardi's popularity, Richard Nixon once considered him as a possible running mate in the 1968 presidential election but dropped the idea upon learning about Lombardi's support for the Democratic Party.

== Illness and death ==
Lombardi had suffered from digestive tract problems as early as 1967 and he had refused his doctor's request to undergo a proctoscopic exam. On June 24, 1970, Lombardi was admitted to Georgetown University Hospital and tests "revealed anaplastic carcinoma in the rectal area of his colon, a fast-growing malignant cancer in which the cells barely resemble their normal appearance". On July 27, Lombardi was readmitted to Georgetown and exploratory surgery found that the cancer was terminal. Lombardi and Marie received family, friends, clergy, players and former players at his hospital bedside. He received a phone call from President Nixon telling Lombardi that all of the U.S. was behind him, to which Lombardi replied that he would never give up his fight against his illness. On his deathbed, Lombardi told Father Tim that he was not afraid to die, but that he regretted he could not have accomplished more in his life. Lombardi died in Washington, D.C. at 7:12 a.m. on Thursday, September 3, 1970, surrounded by his wife, parents, both children and six grandchildren. He was 57.

The funeral was held on September 7 at St. Patrick's Cathedral in Manhattan. Approximately 1,500 people lined Fifth Avenue, and the avenue was closed to traffic between 39th and 50th Street. Cardinal Terence Cooke preached the homily. In attendance were team officials, coaches Tom Landry, Dick Nolan, Weeb Ewbank, Alex Webster, Norm Van Brocklin, Phil Bengtson and Bill Austin, Commissioner Pete Rozelle, past and present members of the Packers, Redskins, and Giants, broadcasters Ray Scott and Howard Cosell, former students from Saints, colleagues and players from West Point (including Red Blaik), and classmates from Fordham University, including the remaining Seven Blocks of Granite. (Note: Honorary pallbearers included Bart Starr, Paul Hornung, Willie Davis, Tony Canadeo, Wellington Mara, Dick Bourguignon, Edward Bennett Williams, and Marc Chubb.) Lombardi was interred in Mount Olivet Cemetery in Middletown Township, New Jersey; before Super Bowl XLVIII was played at MetLife Stadium in New Jersey in 2014, the cemetery's superintendent sought to have the Vince Lombardi Trophy brought to his gravesite.

== In popular culture ==
In 1968, Lombardi starred in a half-hour motivational film titled Second Effort, which has been called "The best-selling training film of all time".

On December 14, 1973, ABC aired Legend in Granite starring Ernest Borgnine as Vince. The biographical TV drama focused mostly on his first two seasons as Packers head coach (1959–1960).

A service area on the New Jersey Turnpike dedicated to and named after Lombardi opened in 1974.

The high school in the 1979 movie Rock 'n' Roll High School is named Vince Lombardi High School.

The first American play about Vince Lombardi premiered on September 28th, 1984 at Broom Street Theater in Madison, Wisconsin. Packer Glory! won over audiences, including Green Bay Press-Gazette reporter James Bartlet, who had worked as a typist in the Packer press box and was neighbor to backfield coach Red Cochran

In 1986, CHCH aired the TV movie Lombardi: I Am Not a Legend starring Robert Knuckle in the title role depicting Lombardi's life up until the NFL.

In 1996, Nike aired several commercials featuring Jerry Stiller as the ghost of Lombardi.

In 2005, ESPN produced Code Breakers, depicting the West Point cheating scandal and its effect on the football program. Richard Zeppieri played then-Assistant Coach Lombardi.

A play titled Lombardi opened on Broadway at the Circle in the Square Theatre in New York City in October 2010, following an out-of-town tryout at the Mahaiwe Theater in Great Barrington, Massachusetts. The production starred Dan Lauria as Lombardi and Judith Light as his wife, Marie. The play received positive reviews, as did Lauria's performance.

NFL Films and HBO produced a film about Lombardi that debuted Saturday, December 11, 2010.

== Honors ==
- In May 1967, Lombardi "... received Fordham's highest honor, the Insignis Medal ... for being a great teacher"
- On January 13, 1969, he was inducted into the Knights of Malta at St. Patrick's.
- In Italy, in the city of Castel Giorgio, the football field where the first World Championship Final of American Football was played is named after Vince Lombardi.
- Inducted into the Fordham University Athletic Hall of Fame in 1971

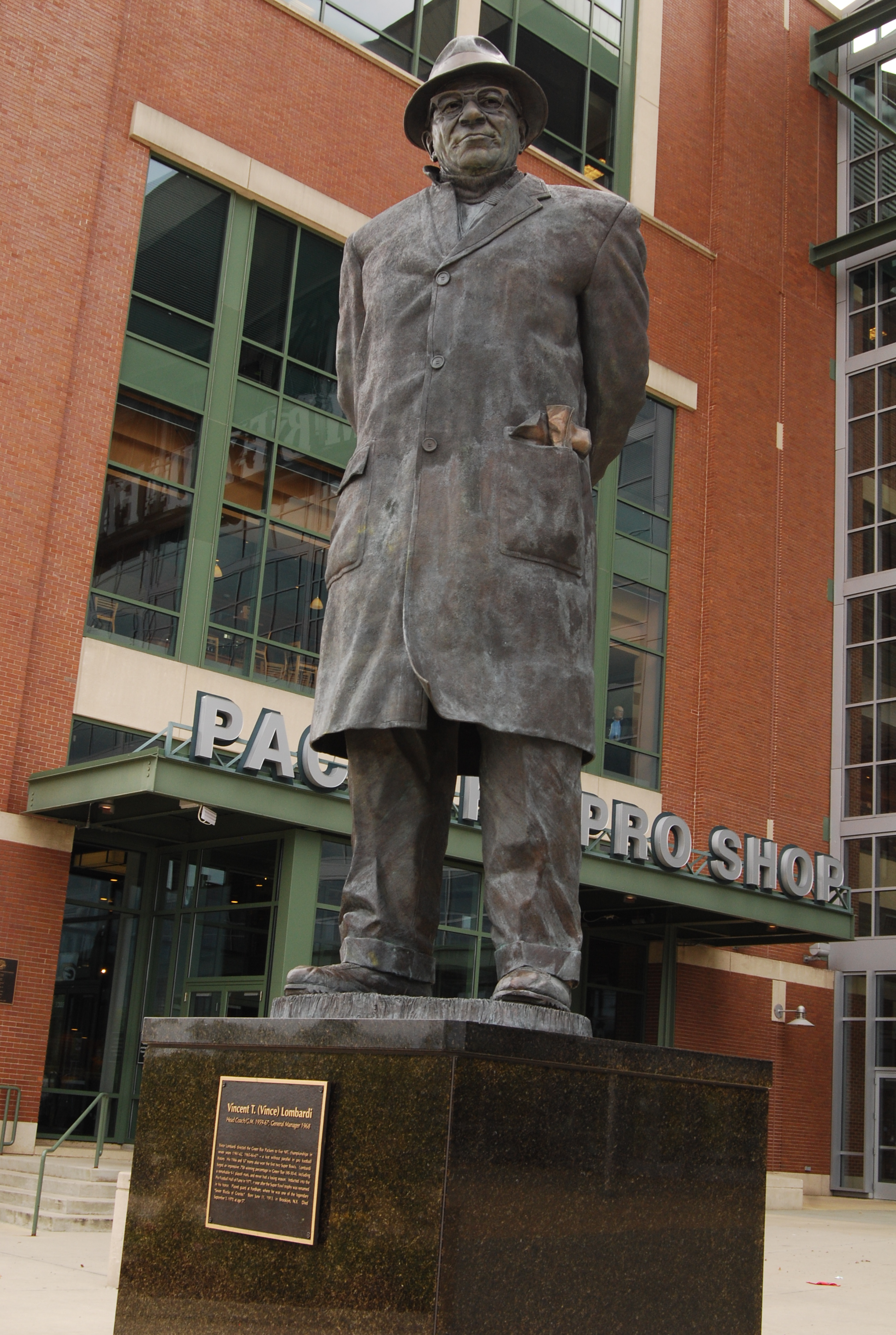
Statue of Vince Lombardi at Lambeau Field.

- As part of the Lambeau Field renovation in 2003, a 14-foot statue of Lombardi (along with one for Curly Lambeau) now stands on a plaza outside the stadium.
- In 1968, Highland Avenue in Green Bay, home to the Packers' Lambeau Field, was renamed Lombardi Avenue.
- In 1969, the Catholic Youth Organization (CYO) awarded Lombardi with the Jack Mara sportsman of the year.
- The Lombardi Comprehensive Cancer Center at Georgetown University is named in his honor.
- One of the Green Bay School District's public middle schools is named the Lombardi Middle School.
- The football field at Old Bridge High School in Old Bridge, New Jersey, is named Lombardi Field. The football field in Palisades Park is also known as Lombardi Field.
- A plaque dedication installed in 1974 in the sidewalk on a square (unofficially called Vince Lombardi Square) near Sheepshead Bay Road and East 14th Street in Brooklyn, New York.
- There are two places in the Bensonhurst area, which are, or were, dedicated to Lombardi at one time: P.S. 204 Vince Lombardi Elementary School, and the entire Bensonhurst stretch of 16th Avenue was once dedicated by the City of New York as "Vince Lombardi Boulevard"
- The Vince Lombardi Service Area and park-and-ride is the northernmost rest area on the New Jersey Turnpike, at mileposts 116E on the Eastern Spur and 115.5W on the Western Spur. Outside the gift shop is a plaque about his life, which notes that he is buried in Mount Olivet Cemetery, Middletown, New Jersey.
- The Vincent T. Lombardi Council, No. 6552, Knights of Columbus, in Middletown, NJ is named for him.
- The Vince Lombardi Cancer clinic at Aurora Health Care is named after him.
- The Vincent T. Lombardi Center at Fordham University was named for the coach.
- In 1970, the NFL's Super Bowl Trophy was renamed the Vince Lombardi Trophy
- In 1970, the Rotary Club of Houston created the Lombardi Award, which is given annually to the best college football offensive, or defensive, lineman or linebacker.
- In 1969, Lombardi received the Silver Buffalo Award, the highest adult award given by the Boy Scouts of America.
- Lombardi was enshrined in the NFL's Pro Football Hall of Fame in 1971.
- Lombardi was elected to the Wisconsin Athletic Hall of Fame in 1976.
- Lombardi is a member of the Ring of Fame of the Washington Commanders (formerly known as the Redskins).
- Induction into the American Football Association's Semi Pro Football Hall of Fame, 1988
- In 2008, Lombardi is inducted into the New Jersey Hall of Fame
- Lombardi appeared on a U.S. Postage stamp first issued on July 25, 1997.

== Head coaching record ==
| Team | Year | Regular season | | | | | Postseason | | | |
| Team | Year | Won | Lost | Ties | Win ratio | Finish | Won | Lost | Win % | Result |
|---|---|---|---|---|---|---|---|---|---|---|
| GB | 1959 | 7 | 5 | 0 | .583 | T-3rd in NFL West | – | – | – | – |
| GB | 1960 | 8 | 4 | 0 | .667 | 1st in NFL West | 0 | 1 | .000 | Lost to Philadelphia Eagles in NFL Championship |
| GB | 1961 | 11 | 3 | 0 | .786 | 1st in NFL West | 1 | 0 | 1.000 | Won NFL Championship |
| GB | 1962 | 13 | 1 | 0 | .929 | 1st in NFL West | 1 | 0 | 1.000 | Won NFL Championship |
| GB | 1963 | 11 | 2 | 1 | .846 | 2nd in NFL West | – | – | – | – |
| GB | 1964 | 8 | 5 | 1 | .615 | 2nd in NFL West | – | – | – | – |
| GB | 1965 | 10 | 3 | 1 | .769 | 1st in NFL West | 2 | 0 | 1.000 | Won NFL Championship |
| GB | 1966 | 12 | 2 | 0 | .847 | 1st in NFL West | 2 | 0 | 1.000 | Super Bowl I champions |
| GB | 1967 | 9 | 4 | 1 | .692 | 1st in NFL Central | 3 | 0 | 1.000 | Super Bowl II champions |
| GB Total | | 89 | 29 | 4 | .754 | | 9 | 1 | .900 | 5 NFL Championships, 6 conference titles, in 9 seasons |
| WAS | 1969 | 7 | 5 | 2 | .583 | 2nd in Eastern Capital | – | – | – | – |
| WAS Total | | 7 | 5 | 2 | .583 | | | | | |
| Total | | 96 | 34 | 6 | .738 | | 9 | 1 | .900 | |

- The Packers played in the third-place Playoff Bowl in Miami after the 1963 and 1964 seasons; these are categorized as exhibition games.

== Coaching tree ==
Vince Lombardi worked under one head coach:

- Jim Lee Howell, New York Giants (1954–1958)

Assistants under Vince Lombardi who became college or professional head coaches:

- Bill Austin, Pittsburgh Steelers (1966–1968), Washington Redskins (1970)
- Phil Bengtson, Green Bay Packers (1968–1970), New England Patriots (1972)
- Jerry Burns, Minnesota Vikings (1986–1991)
- Tom Fears, New Orleans Saints (1967–1970), Southern California Sun (1974–1975)
- Norb Hecker, Atlanta Falcons (1966–1968)
- Mike McCormack, Philadelphia Eagles (1973–1975), Baltimore Colts (1980–1981), Seattle Seahawks (1982)
- Harland Svare, Los Angeles Rams (1962–1965), San Diego Chargers (1971–1973)

== Books ==
- Run to Daylight! by Vince Lombardi with W. C. Heinz

== Books written about him ==
- Instant Replay, the Green Bay Diary of Jerry Kramer by Jerry Kramer and Dick Schaap
- Football's Greatest Coach: Vince Lombardi by Gene Schoor
- The Lombardi Legacy: Thirty People who were Touched by Greatness by Royce Boyles and Dave Robinson
- Coach: A Season With Lombardi by Tom Dowling
- When Pride Still Mattered : A Life Of Vince Lombardi by David Maraniss
- Vince by Michael O'Brien
- Run to Win: Vince Lombardi on Coaching and Leadership by Donald T. Phillips

== See also ==
- List of Knights of Columbus members
- List of NFL head coach wins leaders
- List of NFL head coaches by playoff record
- List of Super Bowl head coaches

== Sources ==
- Claerbaut, David (2004). Bart Starr: When Leadership Mattered. Lanham, MD: Taylor Trade Publishing. ISBN 978-1-58979-117-6.
- Davis, Jeff (2005). Papa Bear, the life and legacy of George Halas. New York: McGraw-Hill. ISBN 978-0-07-146054-5.
- Davis, Jeff (2008). Rozelle: Czar of the NFL. Foreword by Ernie Accorsi. New York: McGraw-Hill. ISBN 978-0-07-159352-6.
- Day, Paul; Iyer, Vinnie; Boswell, James (August 3, 2009). "Sports' 50 greatest coaches". Sporting News. 233 (16): 32–45.
- Eisenberg, John (2009). That First Season: How Vince Lombardi Took the Worst Team in the NFL and Set It on the Path to Glory. New York: Houghton Mifflin Harcourt Publishing Company.
- Flynn, George L. (1976). The Vince Lombardi Scrapbook. New York: Grosset and Dunlap New York. ISBN 978-0-448-12401-8.
- Gruver, Edward (1998). The Ice Bowl: The Cold Truth About Football's Most Unforgettable Game. Ithaca, New York: McBooks Press, Inc. ISBN 978-1-59013-080-3.
- Kramer, Jerry; Schapp, Dick (2006). Instant Replay, The Green Bay Diary of Jerry Kramer. New York: Doubleday. ISBN 978-0-385-51745-4.
- Levy, Alan H. (2003). Tackling Jim Crow, Racial Segregation in Professional Football. Jefferson, North Carolina: McFarland and Co., Inc. ISBN 978-0-7864-1597-7.
- Lombardi Jr., Vince (2003). The Essential Vince Lombardi: Words & Wisdom to Motivate. New York: McGraw-Hill. ISBN 978-0-07-139096-5.
- MacCambridge, Michael (2004). America's Game. New York: Anchor Books. ISBN 978-0-307-48143-6.
- Maraniss, David (1999). When Pride Still Mattered, A Life of Vince Lombardi. Simon & Schuster. ISBN 978-0-618-90499-0.
- O'Brien, Michael (1987). Vince: A Personal Biography of Vince Lombardi. New York: William Morrow and Company, Inc. ISBN 978-0-688-07406-7.
- Phillips, Donald T. (2001). Run to Win. New York: St. Martin's Griffin. ISBN 978-0-312-27298-2.
- Ross, Charles K. (1999). Outside the Lines: African Americans and the Integration of the National Football League. New York: New York Publishing Company. ISBN 978-0-8147-7495-3.
- Summerall, Pat; Levin, Michael (2010). Giants: What I learned about life from Vince Lombardi and Tom Landry. Hoboken, NJ: John Wiley and Sons, Inc. ISBN 978-0-470-90908-9.
- Wiebusch, John (1971). Lombardi. Chicago: Triumph Books. ISBN 978-1-57243-028-0.
