= Beatty =

Beatty may refer to:

== Places ==
=== U.S. places ===
- Beatty, Nevada
- Beatty, Ohio
- Beatty, Oregon
- Beatty, Kentucky, now known as Beattyville

=== Other places ===
- Beatty, Saskatchewan, Canada
- Beatty, South Australia, Australia
- Mount Mary, South Australia, Australia, named Beatty from 1918 until 1940

== Other uses ==
- Beatty (surname)
- Beatty Brothers Limited (Canada)

== See also ==
- Beatty Lake (disambiguation)
- Beaty (disambiguation)
- Beattie (disambiguation)
- Batey (disambiguation)
