= Alexander Campbell (musician and writer) =

Scottish musician and writer

Alexander Campbell (22 February 1764 – 15 May 1824) was a Scottish musician and miscellaneous writer.

== Early life and education ==
Alexander Campbell was born on 22 February 1764 at a farm in Tombea, Loch Lubnaig, Perthshire. The second son of a carpenter, he was first educated at the grammar school in Callander before the Campbell family relocated to Edinburgh. After his father's death when he was eleven years old, the Campbell family was supported by John Campbell (died 1795), the eldest son, who was precentor at the Canongate church, and a friend of the poet Robert Burns.

Alexander and John Campbell were both pupils of the castrato Giusto Fernando Tenducci, then a music teacher in Edinburgh, who helped to establish the brothers in their profession. Tenducci gave Alexander a thorough grounding in both singing technique and counterpoint before he began working as a music teacher in Edinburgh in the early 1780s. His focus as a teacher was in harpsichord and singing instruction, and his pupils included Walter Scott and his brothers but they showed little aptitude for music. The first chapter of John Gibson Lockhart's Memoirs of the Life of Sir Walter Scott humorously states of these lessons, "our neighbour, Lady Cunningham, sent to beg the boys might not all be flogged precisely at the same hour, as, though she had no doubt the punishment was deserved, the noise of the concord was really dreadful".

== Early career in music ==
By 1782 Alexander Campbell was also working as an organist to an Episcopal Chapel in the neighbourhood of Nicholson Street, and while working there made an attempt at a career as a composer. He produced Twelve Songs Set to Music; a work uncertainly dated by the Oxford Dictionary of National Biography (ODNB) to 1785? but definitively dated by David N. Johnson to 1792 in Grove Music Online. Of this collection of songs, Johnson wrote that they were "imaginative but technically incompetent". The ODNB highlights two songs in the collection, "The Mad Song" (text taken from Mackenzie's The Man of Feeling) and "An Address to the Nightingale" (text taken from Beattie's The Hermit), of being worthy of musical and historical interest.

In the 1780s Campbell developed a quarrelsome relationship with the caricaturist John Kay which led Kay to draw an unflattering portrayal of Campbell included in volume II of his Portraits. This etching, A Medley of Musicians, or, Campbell's Concert (1784), is now held in the collection of the Metropolitan Museum of Art in New York City. It depicts Campbell turning a hand organ while asses bray, a dog howls, a bagpipe is blown, and a saw sharpened as an accompaniment.

Campbell also composed songs which were interpolated into various theatrical productions in Edinburgh, and in 1795 he composed a full-length opera which he submitted to a London theatre for consideration and which was never returned to him.

== Marriage, medical studies, artist, and writer ==
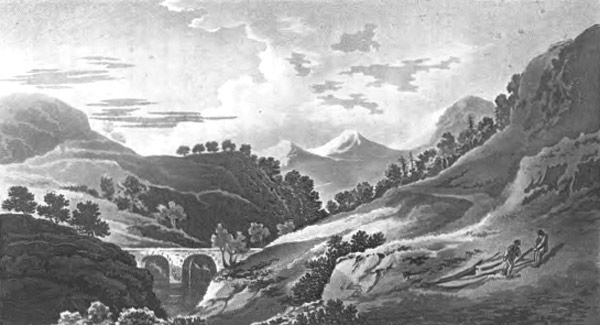
Pass of Killiecrankie, from "A Journey from Edinburgh Through Parts of North Britain" by Campbell.

Campbell married twice at a comparatively early age. His second wife was the widow of Ranald Macdonald of Keppoch. Thinking that the connection thus formed might be useful in procuring an appointment, he resigned his music teaching and studied medicine at the University of Edinburgh. His venture into medicine was short lived, and unsuccessful. In 1798 he announced that he had written A Free and Impartial Inquiry into the Present State of Medical Knowledge, but the work was never published. He did, however, publish Odes and Miscellaneous Poems, by a Student of Medicine at the University of Edinburgh (1796). Several of his drawing of highland scenery were also published in this period.

In 1798 Campell's An Introduction to the History of Poetry in Scotland was published in Edinburgh; a work illustrated by David Allen and dedicated to Henry Fuseli. In addition to containing information about contemporary Scottish poets and poetasters the book also included a collection of Scotch songs. The ODNB describes this work as "written in a curiously stilted style". While only 90 copies of this book were published, L. G. Kosegarten's Reise durch die schottischen Hochlande und einen Theil der Hebriden (1802; a German-language translation of Thomas Garnett's Observations on a tour through the Highlands) contains a supplement by Kosegarten which is based heavily on Campbell's book. In particular, Kosegarten uphold's Campbell's defense of James Macpherson's Ossian.

Campbell was both illustrator and author of the book A Journey from Edinburgh through parts of North Britain (1802) which was published by Francis Jukes in two volumes and contains 44 aquatints of places sketched by Campbell "on the spot". The ODNB describes this work as "an interesting and even valuable picture of the state of many parts of the country at the beginning of the century." The book also contains an overview of Eddinburgh's notable engravers and artists, of which John Kay is conspicuously absent.

In his next work, a "poem in six books" called The Grampians Desolate (1804, Edinburgh), Campbell focuses on the negative impact sheep-farming has had on the landscape of the highlands. The ODBN states that "more than half of this work, which is without literary merit, consists of notes." A melancholy incident recorded in a note to page 11 led to the establishment of the Edinburgh Destitute Sick Society.

After some interval there appeared Albyn's anthology, or, A select collection of the melodies and vocal poetry of Scotland, peculiar to Scotland and the Isles, hitherto unpublished (2 vols. Edinburgh, 1816 and 1818). Campbell had projected this work since 1790, but it was not till Henry Mackenzie, Walter Scott (who obtained the prince regent's acceptance of the dedication of the book), and other Edinburgh men of note, gave him their help that the project was carried out. A grant was obtained from the Highland Society, and the author travelled between eleven and twelve hundred miles in collecting materials (preface). Among the contributors of verse are Scott, Hogg, Jamieson, and Alexander Boswell. The publication was a success, although a promised third volume never appeared.

Albyn's anthology is important as an early publication of piobaireachd songs and of music using Gaelic language text, and for its commentary on earlier publications of Scottish music. It contained a total of 191 Gaelic folk songs from Northwest Scotland, and included the first publication of John Wilson's lyric "Turn Ye to Me". The work is also noted for Campbell's controversial claim of authorship of the well-known tune to Tannahill's "Gloomy winter's noo awa". While disputed by some, the ODNB write that "[while] his tune resembles an older traditional melody, there is sufficient change of character in it for Campbell to deserve the credit". This tune was notably utilized in Michael Nyman's award-winning score for Jane Campion's film The Piano (1993). Grove Music Online states that while the tune enjoyed great popularity in many pirated version it brought Campbell neither fame or fortune.

== Later life ==
In the last years of his life Campbell fell into great poverty, and obtained his living chiefly by copying manuscripts for his old pupil Scott, though 'even from his patron he would take no more than he thought his services as a transcriber fairly earned.' Scott, however, tells a half-pitiful story of a dinner which Archibald Constable gave to 'his own circle of literary serfs,' when 'poor Allister Campbell and another drudge of the same class' ran a race for a new pair of breeches, which were there displayed 'before the threadbare rivals.' Scott thought the picture might be highly coloured, and at any rate Constable bestowed on him 'many substantial benefits,' as he gratefully acknowledges in a letter written the year before his death, which took place from an attack of apoplexy 15 May 1824. His manuscripts were sold 'under judicial authority.' Among them was a tragedy, which was never published. Campbell was a warm-hearted and accomplished, though somewhat unpractical, man. Scott, who wrote an obituary notice of him in the 'Edinburgh Weekly Journal,' says that, though his acquirements were considerable, 'they did not reach that point of perfection which the public demand of those who expect to derive bread from the practice of the fine arts.'
