= Beaty =

Beaty may refer to:

- Beaty (surname)
- Beaty, Illinois, U.S., unincorporated community in Fulton County
- Beaty Crossroads, Alabama, U.S., unincorporated community on Sand Mountain in northern DeKalb County

== See also ==
- Beatty (disambiguation)
- Batey (disambiguation)
