= Beaty (surname) =

Beaty is a surname. Notable people with the name include:

- Albert Lee Beaty (1869–1936), American politician
- Andrea Beaty, American children's author
- Aubrey Beaty (1916–2009), British Army soldier
- Daniel Beaty (born 1975), American actor, singer, writer, composer, and poet
- David Beaty, several people
- Forrest Beaty (born 1944), American track and field athlete
- Gary Beaty (born 1943), American disc jockey and television announcer
- Howard Beaty, American politician
- James Beaty, several people
- Madisen Beaty (born 1995), American teen actress
- Malcolm Beaty (born 1939), English cricketer
- Martin Beaty (1784–1856), United States Representative from Kentucky
- Matt Beaty (born 1993), American baseball player
- Powhatan Beaty (1837–1916), African American soldier and actor
- Richard William Beaty (c.1799–1883), Irish music teacher, composer and organist
- Robert T Beaty, Scottish engineer
- Zelmo Beaty (1939–2013), American professional basketball player

== See also ==
- Beatie, given name and surname
- Beatty (surname)
- Batey (surname)
