= Mammary tumor =

Type of veterinary cancer in mammals

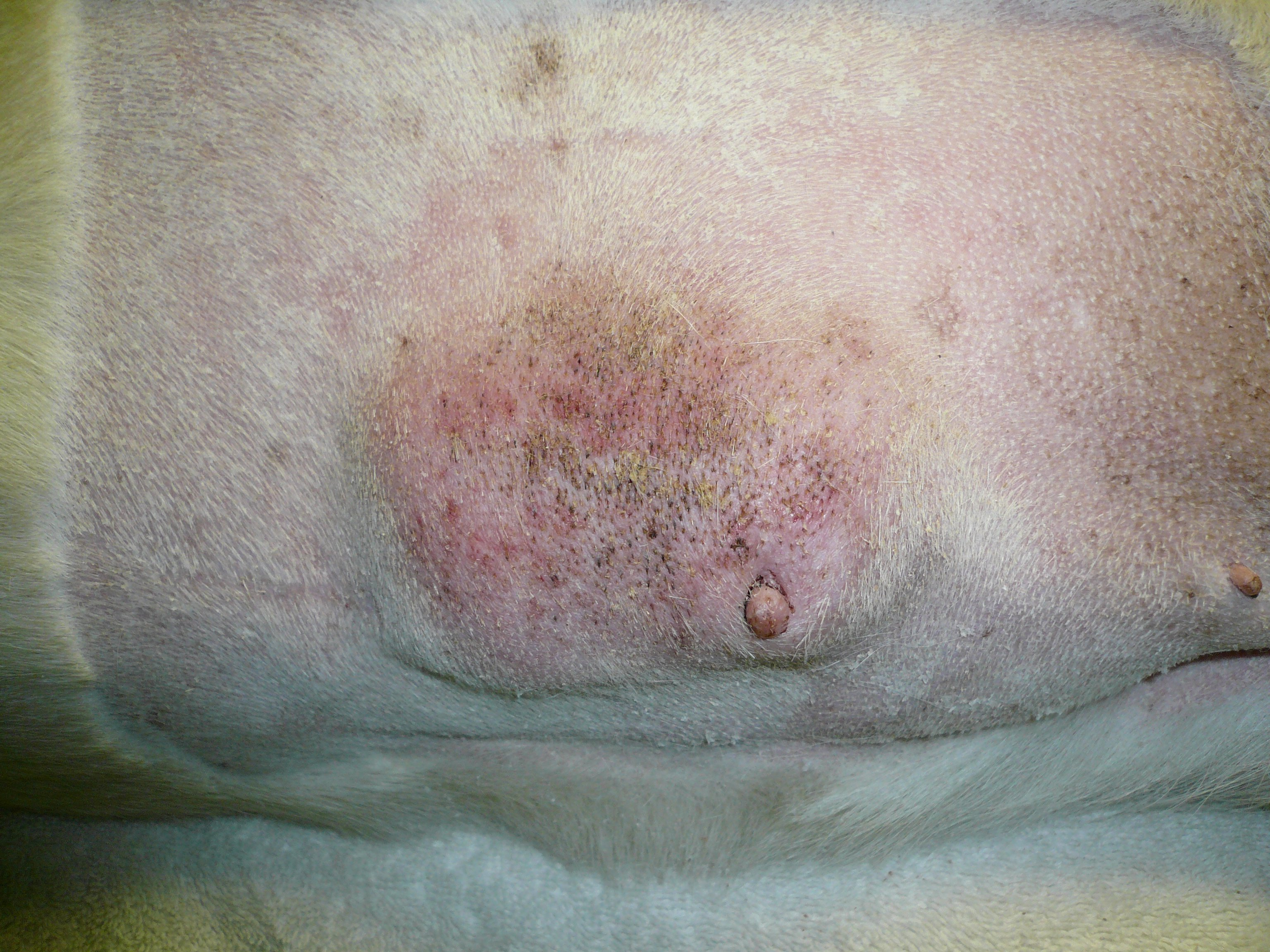
Mammary tumor in a dog

A mammary tumor is a neoplasm originating in the mammary gland. It is a common finding in older female dogs and cats that are not spayed, but they are found in other animals as well. The mammary glands in dogs and cats are associated with their nipples and extend from the underside of the chest to the groin on both sides of the midline. There are many differences between mammary tumors in animals and breast cancer in humans, including tumor type, malignancy, and treatment options. The prevalence in dogs is about three times that of women. In dogs, mammary tumors are the second most common tumor (after skin tumors) over all and the most common tumor in female dogs with a reported incidence of 3.4%. Multiple studies have documented that spaying female dogs when young greatly decreases their risk of developing mammary neoplasia when aged. Compared with female dogs left intact, those spayed before puberty have 0.5% of the risk, those spayed after one estrous cycle have 8.0% of the risk, and dogs spayed after two estrous cycles have 26.0% of the risk of developing mammary neoplasia later in life. Overall, unspayed female dogs have a seven times greater risk of developing mammary neoplasia than do those that are spayed. While the benefit of spaying decreases with each estrous cycle, some benefit has been demonstrated in female dogs even up to 9 years of age. There is a much lower risk (about 1 percent) in male dogs and a risk in cats about half that of dogs.

== In dogs ==
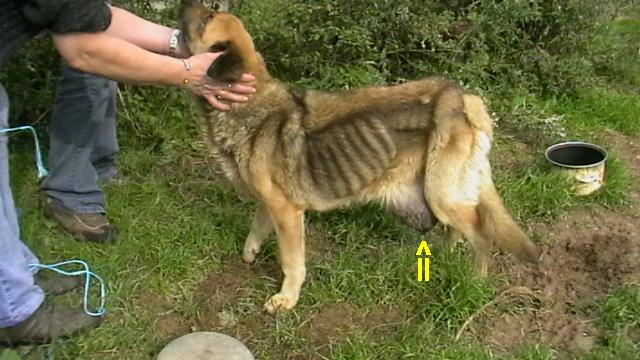
Emaciated female dog with a 9-month-old mammary tumor.

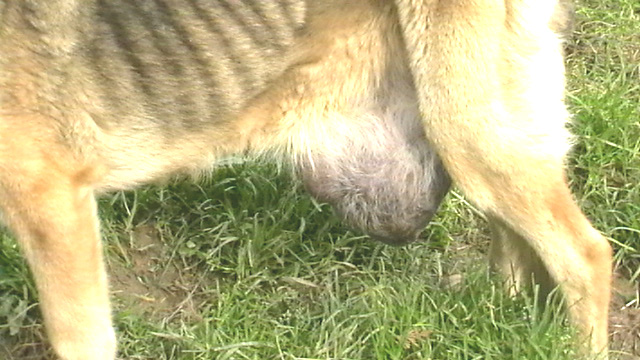
The same, closer

Radiograph (x-ray) of an affected dog. The metastases cause the dog difficulty in breathing.

=== Causes ===
The exact causes for the development of canine mammary tumors are not fully understood. However, hormones of the estrous cycle seem to be involved. Female dogs who are not spayed or who are spayed later than the first heat cycle are more likely to develop mammary tumors. Dogs have an overall reported incidence of mammary tumors of 3.4 percent. Dogs spayed before their first heat have 0.5 percent of this risk, and dogs spayed after just one heat cycle have 8 percent of this risk. The tumors are often multiple. The average age of dogs with mammary tumors is ten to eleven years old. Obesity at one year of age and eating red meat have also been associated with an increased risk for these tumors, as has the feeding of high fat homemade diets. There are several hypotheses on the molecular mechanisms involved in the development of canine mammary tumors but a specific genetic mutation has not been identified.

=== Biology ===
Historically, about 50 percent of mammary tumors in dogs were found to be malignant, although taking into account tumor behavior, one study has estimated true malignancy in mammary tumors to be 21 to 22 percent. Adenomas and fibroadenomas make up the benign types. Malignant mammary tumors are divided into sarcomas, carcinosarcomas, inflammatory carcinomas (usually anaplastic carcinomas), and carcinomas (including adenocarcinomas), which are the most common. Inflammatory carcinomas describe tumors that are fast growing and have bruising, edema, and pain, and can also cause disseminated intravascular coagulation. They are the most malignant type of canine mammary tumor.

Malignant tumors are also subdivided histopathologically into those showing blood vessel wall invasion and those that do not. Without blood vessel wall invasion there is a better prognosis. Dogs with noninvasive adenocarcinomas have an average survival time of two years, while dogs with invasive adenocarcinomas have an average survival time of one year. Tumor size also affects the prognosis, in that dogs with tumors greater than five centimeters have a greater chance of lymph node metastasis. Tumor type is also important. Sarcomas and carcinosarcomas carry an average survival time of nine to twelve months. Inflammatory carcinomas have a very poor prognosis, and have usually metastasized by the time of diagnosis. Metastasis for any malignant mammary tumor is usually to the regional lymph nodes and lungs.

The molecular carcinogenesis of canine mammary tumors are not completely understood. However, the increasing information on molecular pathways involved in the carcinogenesis of this canine tumor has potential to complement and refine the current diagnostic and therapeutic approach to this tumor type. Furthermore, current data show that significant similarities and differences exist between canine and human mammary tumors at the molecular level.

=== Diagnosis and treatment ===
Appearance and location of the tumor is enough to identify it as a mammary tumor. Biopsy will give type and invasiveness of the tumor. In addition, newer studies showed that certain gene expression patterns are associated with malignant behaviour of canine mammary tumors.

Surgical removal is the treatment of choice, but chest x-rays should be taken first to rule out metastasis. Removal should be with wide margins to prevent recurrence, taking the whole mammary gland if necessary. Because 40 to 50 percent of dog mammary tumors have estrogen receptors, spaying is recommended by many veterinarians. A recent study showed a better prognosis in dogs that are spayed at the time of surgery or that had been recently spayed. However, several other studies found no improvement of disease outcome when spaying was performed after the tumor had developed. Chemotherapy is rarely used.

=== Breeds at increased risk ===
- Chihuahua
- Poodle
- Brittany Spaniel
- English Setter
- Pointer
- Fox Terrier
- Boston Terrier
- Cocker Spaniel
- Lhasa Apso

== In cats ==
Mammary tumors are the third most common neoplasia in cats, following lymphoid and skin cancers. The incidence of mammary tumors in cats is reduced by 91 percent in cats spayed prior to six months of age and by 86 percent in cats spayed prior to one year, according to one study. Siamese cats and Japanese breeds seem to have increased risk, and obesity also appears to be a factor in tumor development. Malignant tumors make up 80 to 96 percent of mammary tumors in cats, almost all adenocarcinomas. Male cats may also develop mammary adenocarcinoma, albeit rarely, and the clinical course is similar to female cats. As in dogs, tumor size is an important prognostic factor, although for tumors less than three centimeters the individual size is less predictive. According to one study, cats with tumors less than three cm had an average survival time of 21 months, and cats with tumors greater than three cm had an average survival of 12 months. About 10 percent of cat mammary tumors have estrogen receptors, so spaying at the time of surgery has little effect on recurrence or survival time. Metastasis tends to be to the lungs and lymph nodes, and rarely to bone. Diagnosis and treatment is similar to the dog. There is a better prognosis with bilateral radical surgery (removing both mammary chains) than with more conservative surgery. Doxorubicin has shown some promise in treatment.

== In rats ==
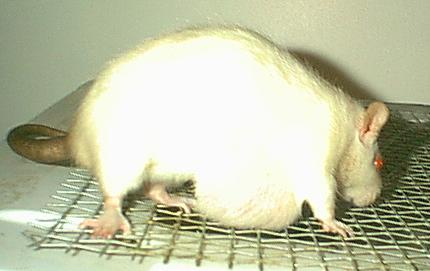
A mammary tumor in a rat.

Most mammary tumors in rats are benign fibroadenomas, which are also the most common tumor in the rat. Less than 10 percent are adenocarcinomas. They occur in male and female rats. The tumors can be large and occur anywhere on the trunk. There is a good prognosis with surgery. Spayed rats have a decreased risk of developing mammary tumors.

== In mice ==
Most mammary tumors in mice are adenocarcinomas. They can be caused by viral infection. Recurrence rates are high, and therefore there is a poor prognosis. There is frequently local tissue invasion and metastasis to the lungs. A well known tumor virus of the mouse is the mouse mammary tumor virus, which may be the most common cause of this tumor in mice.

== In other animals ==
- Ferrets: Mammary tumors are rare in ferrets. Appearance tends to be a soft, dark colored lump. Most seem to be benign and occur most frequently in neutered males. Surgery is recommended.
- Guinea pigs: Mammary tumors in guinea pigs occur in males and females. Most are benign, but 30 percent are adenocarcinomas. They usually do not metastasize, but aggressive surgery is necessary to prevent recurrence.
- Hamsters and gerbils: Mammary tumors tend to be benign in hamsters and malignant in gerbils.
- Hedgehogs: Mammary gland adenocarcinoma is the most common tumor of the hedgehog.
