= Beattie =

Beattie may refer to:

== People ==
- Beattie (surname)
- Beattie Edmondson (born 1987), English actress
- Beattie Feathers (1909–1979), American football player
- Beatrice Beattie Goad (born 1997), Australian footballer
- Beattie Martin (1890–1958), Canadian surgeon, team doctor and president of the Saskatchewan Roughriders Canadian Football League team
- Beattie Ramsay (1895–1952), Canadian ice hockey player

== Other uses ==
- Beattie, Kansas, United States, a city
- Beattie Gold Mine, an abandoned gold mine in Duparquet, Quebec, Canada
- Beattie (automobile), a kitcar
- Beatrice Bellman ("Beattie"), a fictional Jewish mother played by Maureen Lipman, featured in a British Telecom advertising campaign

== See also ==
- Beattie well tanks, a series of 19th century steam locomotives of seven different designs
- Beatties of London, usually known as just "Beatties", former toy and model shop
- Beatties, UK department store group acquired by House of Fraser in 2005
- Beattie Formation, a geologic formation in Kansas, Oklahoma and Nebraska, United States
- Beatty (disambiguation)
