= Beatie =

Beatie is a name. Notable people with the name include:

- Thomas Beatie (born 1974), American public speaker, author, and advocate with transgender and sexuality issues
- Beatie Deutsch (née Rabin; born 1989), Haredi Jewish American-Israeli marathon runner
- Beatie Edney (born 1962), English television actress
- Beatie Wolfe, Anglo-American singer-songwriter

== See also ==
- Savas Beatie, California-based book publishing company
- Beattie (surname)
- Beaty (surname)
- Beatty (surname)
