= Robert Beattie =

Robert Beattie may refer to:

- Robert Beattie (writer), American 21st century lawyer and author
- Robert Ethelbert Beattie (1875–1925), Canadian politician and pharmacist
- Robert M. Beattie (born 1962), British paediatric gastroenterologist
- Robert Beattie (rugby union) (born 1993), Scottish rugby player
- Bobby Beattie (Robert Beattie, 1916–2002), Scottish footballer

== See also ==
- Bob Beattie (disambiguation)
- Robert Beatty (disambiguation)
