= Beatty (surname) =

Origin
- Meaning: Diminutive of Bartholomew (patronymic); "one who held land on condition of supplying food to those billeted on him by the chief"; "public victualler"
- Region of origin: Scottish borders, Ireland

Other names
- Variant forms: Bate, Beattie, Beaty, Beatey, Betagh, Betty, MacCaffrey, McCaffrey, MacVitty, MacWatty, MacWattie, Watson

Beatty is a surname of Scottish and Irish origin. In some cases, it was derived from the given name Bartholomew, which had diminutives including Bate or Baty. Male descendants were then often called Beatty, or similar derivations like Beattie or Beatey.

In Ireland, the name may be an Anglicization of the surname mac a'Bhiadhtaigh, which was derived from Irish biadhtach "one who held land on condition of supplying food (biad) to those billeted on him by a chief". Another Irish surname, Betagh – with a similar etymology, "public victualler" or "hospitaller" – may also have been Anglicized as Beatty or Beattie.

== History ==
The Y-DNA haplogroup R-BY1127, also known as R-Y335134 and R-A430 (and a descendant subclade of R-L21, via R-S169.2/R-L159.2), is extremely common among males with the surname Beatty or Beattie, as well as related surnames like Baty or Batie. While these haplogroups are exceptionally common in Ireland, especially Leinster, they are also common in Scotland.

In Scotland, the Beatties were a reiver clan in the Langholm area of the Esk Valley.

Despite the Irish origins, in at least some cases, of the surnames Beatty or Beattie, it is possible that a majority of people with these surnames in Ireland are the descendants of Scots who migrated to Ulster in the 17th century. Beattie is common in counties Antrim and Down, whilst Beatty is more common in counties Armagh and Tyrone. In Fermanagh in 1962, Beatty was the 15th most common name and was recorded as synonymous with the names Betty and MacCaffrey (or McCaffrey).

== Notable people ==
Notable people with the surname include:

- Alfred Chester Beatty (1875–1968), collector of Chinese and Japanese art
- Andrew Beatty (born 1980), Northern Irish journalist and editor
- Beatty (Fahrenheit 451), fictional character from the novel Fahrenheit 451
- Bob Beatty, American football coach
- Bruce W. Beatty, Canadian graphic designer
- Chris Beatty (born 1973), American football coach
- Chuck Beatty (born 1946), former American football player and Texas mayor
- Clyde Beatty (1903–1965), American trainer of wild animals and circus performer
- David Beatty, 1st Earl Beatty (1871–1936), British Admiral at the Battle of Jutland
- David Beatty, 2nd Earl Beatty (1905–1972), British politician
- David L. Beatty (1798–1881), fifth mayor of Louisville, Kentucky
- David R. Beatty (born 1942), Canadian businessman
- Edward Wentworth Beatty (1877–1943), Canadian lawyer and university chancellor
- George Beatty (judge), judge and former politician in the Canadian province of Ontario
- George William Beatty (1887–1955), pioneer aviator who set early altitude and distance records
- Hank Beatty (born 2003), American football player
- Helen Beatty Noland (c. 1907–1962) née Helen Hagerman Beatty, American politician
- Jaime Lyn Beatty, American actress and singer
- James Beatty (engineer) (1820–1856), Irish railway engineer
- Jerome Beatty Jr. (1916–2002), children's author of the Matthew Looney books
- Jim Beatty (born 1934), American former athlete
- John Beatty (1922–1975), part of duo John and Patricia Beatty, American writers of children's books
- John Beatty (Continental Congress) (1749–1826), American physician and statesman
- John Beatty (illustrator) (born 1961), American illustrator
- John Beatty (Ohio banker) (1828–1914), American Civil War general
- John Beatty (philosopher) (born 1951), Canadian philosopher
- John William Beatty (1869–1941), Canadian painter
- Joyce Beatty (born 1950), American politician
- Laura Beatty (born 1963), English author
- Linda Beatty (born 1952), American actress
- Maria Beatty (fl. 1980s–2010s), American film director, producer and actress
- Mike Beatty (fl. 1990s–2010s), American politician
- Nancy Beatty (fl. 1970s–2010s), Canadian actress
- Ned Beatty (1937–2021), American actor
- Otto Beatty Jr. (1940–2021), American lawyer and politician
- Patricia Beatty (1922–1991), part of duo John and Patricia Beatty, American writers of children's books
- Paul Beatty (born 1962), African-American author
- Perrin Beatty (born 1950), Canadian politician
- Peter Beatty (1910–1949)
- Richmond C. Beatty (1905–1961), American academic, biographer and critic
- Robert Beatty (1909–1992), Canadian actor
- Robert Beatty (artist) (born 1981), American musician and artist
- Ryan Beatty (born 1995), American singer
- Samuel Beatty (general) (1820–1885), American Civil War general
- Scott Beatty, American author
- Terry Beatty (born 1958), American comic book artist
- Tracey Beatty (born 1979), Australian basketball player
- Vander L. Beatty (1941–1990), American politician
- Virginia H. Beatty, birth name of Gertrude Franklin (1858–1913), American singer and music educator
- Warren Beatty (born 1937), American actor
- William Beatty (surgeon) (1773–1842), British Navy surgeon serving with Lord Nelson
- William Beatty (Ontario politician) (1835–1898), Canadian businessman and politician
- William H. Beatty (1838–1914), Chief Justice of the Nevada Supreme Court, and later of the California Supreme Court

== See also ==
- Beaty, surname
- Beattie (surname)
- Batey (surname)
- Justice Beatty (disambiguation)
