= James Beattie =

James or Jim Beattie may refer to:

- James Beattie (poet) (1735–1803), Scottish poet, moralist and philosopher
- James Hay Beattie (1768–1790), Scottish scholar, son of above
- James Herries Beattie (1881–1972), New Zealand journalist, historian, and ethnologist
- James J. Beattie (1942–2019), American heavyweight boxer, see Gene Schoor
- Jim Beattie (politician) (born 1948), Canadian politician
- Jim Beattie (baseball) (born 1954), American baseball player
- Jim Beattie (musician), Scottish musician, formerly of Primal Scream
- Jim Beattie (footballer) (born 1973), Scottish footballer
- James Beattie (footballer) (born 1978), English footballer
- James K. Beattie, Australian chemist

== See also ==
- Beatties (James Beattie Ltd), a group of department stores within the House of Fraser Group
- James Beatty (disambiguation)
- James Beaty (disambiguation)
