= Robert Beatty (disambiguation) =

Robert Beatty (1909–1992) was a Canadian actor.

Robert Beatty may also refer to:

- Robert Beatty (artist) (born 1981), American artist and musician
- Robert Beatty (dean of Ardfert) (died 1921), Irish priest
- Robert Beatty (archdeacon of Ardagh) (1821–1891), English clergyman
- Robert Beatty (author), American tech entrepreneur and author
- Robert Beatty, Irish settler and namesake of Beatty Lake (Minnesota)
- Bob Beatty (born 1955), American football coach

== See also ==
- Robert Beattie (disambiguation)
