= Judge Beatty =

Judge Beatty may refer to:

- George Beatty (judge) (fl. 1970s–2020s), provincial judge of the Ontario Court of Justice
- James H. Beatty (1836–1927), judge of the United States District Court for the District of Idaho
- William L. Beatty (1925–2001), judge of the United States District Court for the Southern District of Illinois

== See also ==
- James A. Beaty Jr. (born 1949), judge of the United States District Court for the Middle District of North Carolina
- Justice Beatty (disambiguation)
