= Beatty Lake =

Beatty Lake may refer to:

- Beatty Lake (Minnesota), a lake in Minnesota
- Beatty Lake (Saskatchewan), a lake in Saskatchewan

== See also ==
- Beatty (disambiguation)
