= James Beatty =

James Beatty may refer to:

- Jim Beatty (born 1934), American track and field athlete and politician
- Jim Beatty (musician) (1934–2019), American jazz musician
- James Beatty (engineer) (1820–1856), Irish railway engineer
- James Beatty (Minnesota pioneer) (1817–1892), Minnesota pioneer and territorial legislator
- James H. Beatty (1836–1927), U.S. federal judge
- James Harry Beatty (1890–1966), Canadian politician
- James Franklin Beatty Belford, Canadian politician

== See also ==
- James Beattie (disambiguation)
- James Beaty (disambiguation)
