= William Beatty =

William Beatty may refer to:

- Sir William Beatty (surgeon) (1773–1842), Irish surgeon in the Royal Navy
- William Beatty (Ontario politician) (1835–1898), member of the 1st Parliament of Ontario
- William Henry Beatty (1833–1912), Ontario lawyer and businessman
- William Rabb Beatty (1851–1905), Ontario businessman
- William H. Beatty (1838–1914), former Chief Justice of the Supreme Court of California
- William Beatty (Pennsylvania politician) (1787–1851), U.S. Representative from Pennsylvania
- Will Beatty (born 1985), American football offensive tackle
- William L. Beatty (1925–2001), U.S. federal judge
- William Beatty (rugby union), Irish international rugby union player

== See also ==
- William Beattie (disambiguation)
- William Beattie Nesbitt (1866–1913), Ontario physician and political figure
