= George Beatty =

George Beatty may refer to:

- George Beatty (judge), judge and former politician in the Canadian province of Ontario
- George Beatty (rugby union) (1925–2004), New Zealand rugby union player
- George William Beatty (1887–1955), American pioneer aviator who set early altitude and distance records

== See also ==
- George Beattie (disambiguation)
