= Malcolm Beaty =

English cricketer

Personal information
- Full name: Malcolm Beaty
- Born: 11 January 1939 (age 87); Carlisle, Cumberland, England
- Batting: Right-handed
- Role: Wicket-keeper

Domestic team information
- Years: Team
- 1978: Minor Counties East
- 1957–1979: Cumberland

Career statistics
| Competition | List A |
|---|---|
| Matches | 4 |
| Runs scored | 2 |
| Batting average | 0.66 |
| 100s/50s | –/– |
| Top score | 2 |
| Balls bowled | – |
| Wickets | – |
| Bowling average | – |
| 5 wickets in innings | – |
| 10 wickets in match | – |
| Best bowling | – |
| Catches/stumpings | 2/– |
- Source: Cricinfo, 24 May 2012

Malcolm Beaty (born 11 January 1939) is a former English cricketer. Beaty was a right-handed batsman who fielded as a wicket-keeper. He was born at Carlisle, Cumberland.

Beaty made his debut for Cumberland against Northumberland in the 1957 Minor Counties Championship. He played minor counties cricket for Cumberland from 1957 to 1979, making a total of 119 appearances for the county, the last of which came against the Lancashire Second XI. In 1978, he made four List A appearances for Minor Counties East in the Benson & Hedges Cup, against Middlesex, Sussex, Leicestershire, and Northamptonshire. He struggled in his four appearances with the bat, scoring just 2 runs at an average of 0.66.
