= Bill Beattie (photographer) =

New Zealand photographer

- Born: William Barbour Beattie; 21 August 1902; Auckland, New Zealand
- Died: 6 December 1991 (aged 89); Auckland, New Zealand
- Occupation: Photographer
- Relatives: William Beattie (father)

William Barbour Beattie (21 August 1902 – 6 December 1991) was a well-known and popular New Zealand photographer. He was the chief photographer of The New Zealand Herald and The Weekly News between 1940 and 1968. He worked for a total of 44 years for the Herald. Beattie is prominently remembered for his photographs which captured many aspects of New Zealand's social history in the twentieth century.

Beattie was the son of another prominent photographer William Beattie, and this is where Bill's interest in photography stemmed from. He took his first official news picture for the Herald in 1923 which was of a tram crash on Wellesley St, Auckland. Beattie, who was at a nearby theatre was informed of the incident and rushed to get his camera from the Herald offices.

Beattie was mostly known for his scenic work and his photographs that captured the New Zealand way of life. He travelled extensively up and down the country in order to take these photos and often to rural areas. Beattie took photographs of the building of the Lewis Pass road and of the first road construction that ran from the Haast to Wānaka.

During his long career, Beattie captured on film six royal tours to New Zealand. His first brush with royalty was in 1920 when he photographed the visit of Edward, Prince of Wales. Beattie also took photographs of the Duke and Duchess of York, later to be King George VI and Queen Elizabeth in 1927. He also captured the visit of Elizabeth II to New Zealand in 1953 on her royal tour.

In 1963, Beattie won an international photography competition where he took top prize in the Pacific Travel Association Awards. The competition was to promote travel in the Pacific and Beattie's photograph of sheep mustering at the Ruakituri Station in Hawkes Bay, taken in 1937 won first place. This photograph was also used by National Geographic in a double page spread in a pictorial article used to promote New Zealand.

During World War II, Beattie was a member of the RNZAF, serving in the photographic section.

Beattie died on 6 December 1991, and was cremated at Purewa Crematorium.
