= Batey =

Batey may refer to:

- Batey (game), a plaza for community events in Caribbean Indigenous cultures
- Batey (sugar workers' town)
- Batey (surname)
