= Bob Beattie =

Bob Beattie may refer to:

- Bob Beattie (American football) (1902–1983), American football player
- Bob Beattie (footballer) (born 1943), Australian football player
- Bob Beattie (skiing) (1933–2018), American skiing coach and television commentator

== See also ==
- Bobby Beattie (1916–2002), Scottish footballer
- Robert Beattie (disambiguation)
