= Kelvin Batey =

British-Irish bicycle motocross rider

Personal information
- Full name: Kelvin Batey
- Born: 9 May 1981 (age 45) Market Warsop, Nottinghamshire, United Kingdom
- Height: 1.87 m (6 ft 2 in)
- Weight: 91 kg (201 lb)

Cycling career
- Sport: Cycling
- Current team: Route 55
- Discipline: Bicycle Motocross (BMX)
- Role: Racer
- Rider type: Off Road

Amateur teams
- 1990–1992: Wulfsport
- 1993: Dyno
- 1994–1995: GT Bicycles
- 1996: Giant Bicycles
- 1996–1997: GT Bicycles

Professional teams
- 1997–1999: GT Bicycles
- 2000–2002: Haro Bicycles
- 2003–2005: One Bicycles
- 2005–2006: Intense World Team
- 2007 – present: Free Agent World Team

Kelvin Batey (born 9 May 1981 from Market Warsop, Nottinghamshire) is a British born professional "Mid/Current School" Bicycle Motocross (BMX) racer who competed for Great Britain from the start of his career until 2008 and then for Ireland.

== Racing career milestones ==
Note: Professional first are on the national level unless otherwise indicated.

Started racing: Early 1988 age 6 at a track in Warsop, England

Sanctioning body:

First race result: 1st

First win (local):

First sponsor: Invert Magazine

First national win: 1st

Turned Professional: 1997 age 16 in England

First Professional race result: 6th place - Coppull National May 1997

First Professional win: In Mansfield, England in August 1999.

First Junior Pro* win: Holland European Round - Junior Men 1998

First Senior Pro** race result:

First Senior Pro win:

Retired: Active

Height & weight at height of his career (1999–2015): Ht:6'2" Wt:197 lbs.

*In the NBL it is B"/Superclass/"A" pro (beginning with 2000 season); in the ABA it is "A" pro.
**In the NBL it is "A" pro (Elite men); in the ABA it is "AA" pro.

=== Career factory and major bike shop sponsors ===
Note: This listing only denotes the racer's primary sponsors. At any given time a racer could have numerous ever-changing co-sponsors. Primary sponsorships can be verified by BMX press coverage and sponsor's advertisements at the time in question. When possible exact dates are used.

==== Amateur ====
- Invert Magazine: 1989–1990
- Wulfsport: 1990–1992
- Dyno: 1993
- GT (Gary Turner) Bicycles (UK Division): 1994–1995
- Giant Bicycles: 1996
- GT Bicycles (Europe Division): 1996-December 1999. Batey would turn pro with this sponsor.

==== Professional ====
- GT Bicycles (Europe Division): 1996-December 1999
- Haro Bicycles (UK Division): January 2000-February 2002
- One Bicycles European Team: January 2003-December 2005
- Intense BMX World Team: 21 December 2005 – 31 December 2006
- Free Agent All-Star World Team: 1 January 2007 – 31 December 2010
- Intense Route 55 1 January 2011 – 31 December 2013
- GET Racing 1 January 2014 – present

=== Career bicycle motocross titles ===
Note: Listed are District, State/Provincial/Department, Regional, National, and International titles in italics. Depending on point totals of individual racers, winners of Grand Nationals do not necessarily win National titles. Only sanctioning bodies active during the racer's career are listed.

==== Amateur/Junior ====
British Cycling Bicycle Motocross (BCBMX)(England):

National Bicycle League (NBL)

- None

American Bicycle Association (ABA)

- None

International Bicycle Motocross Federation (IBMXF)*

Fédération Internationale Amateur de Cyclisme (FIAC)*

Union Cycliste Internationale (UCI)*

*See note in professional section

==== Professional/Eite Men ====
British Cycling Bicycle Motocross (BCBMX)(England):

- 2000 Elite Cruiser National Champion
- 2001 Elite Men National Champion
- 2001 Elite Cruiser National Champion
- 2003 Elite Men National Champion
- 2003 Elite Men British Champion
- 2003 Elite Men No Clips Champion
- 2004 Elite Men National Champion
- 2004 Elite Men No Clips Champion
- 2005 Elite Men National Champion
- 2005 Elite Men British Champion
- 2006 Elite Men British Champion
- 2007 Elite Men British Champion
- 2008 Elite Men British Champion
- 2009 Elite Men National Champion
- 2009 Elite Men British Champion
- 2009 Elite Men National Champion
- 2010 Elite Men British Champion

National Bicycle League (NBL)

American Bicycle Association (ABA)

International Bicycle Motocross Federation (IBMXF)*

- None

Fédération Internationale Amateur de Cyclisme (FIAC)*

- None

Union Cycliste Internationale (UCI)*

- 1998 Junior Men European Elite/Junior Champion
- 1999 Junior Men World Bronze Medalist
- 2005 Elite Men Cruiser Silver Medalist
- 2006 Elite Men Cruiser Bronze Medalist
- 2007 Elite Men Cruiser Bronze Medalist
- 2013 Masters World Champion
- 2014 Masters World Silver Medalist
- "2015 Masters World Champion"

*Note: Beginning in 1991 the IBMXF and FIAC, the amateur cycling arm of the UCI, had been holding joint World Championship events as a transitional phase in merging which began in earnest in 1993. Beginning with the 1996 season the IBMXF and FIAC completed the merger and both ceased to exist as independent entities being integrated into the UCI. Beginning with the 1996 World Championships held in Brighton, England the UCI would officially hold and sanction BMX World Championships and with it inherited all precedents, records, streaks, etc. from both the IBMXF and FIAC.

Pro Series Championships

=== Notable accolades ===
British Cycling BMX Rider of the Year 1999

South Yorkshire Sports Personality of the Year 2007

BBC North Male Sports Personality of the Year 2007 runner up

Lifetime achievement award with Cycling Ireland. November 2014

=== Significant injuries ===
- Broken CollarBone at 1997 World Championships, Australia
- Suffered a compound fracture of the femur on 24 May 2002 at the Bike 2002 in Birmingham, England. He fell at the back end of a jump and then a competitor, Steve Peat, cleared the jump but landed on Batey. Was laid up until late summer 2002.
- Broken and dislocated wrist July 2001 - out for 6 months
- Broken hands suffered at World Supercross Cup - out for 3 months
- Concussion, broken hand and broken ribs at GB Olympic trials 2008
- Rotator cuff surgery on shoulder 2008
- Torn posterior cruciate ligament in the knee - August 2015 after falling 20 feet over a pro section while going for a national title at the final round of the series at Birmingham.

=== Miscellaneous ===
Worked at Winterhill School in Rotherham as a PE Teacher.

Working closely with Cycling Ireland and BMX Ireland in promoting the sport in the country.

Brother Liam is a well known poker player who also used to be a top BMX rider in Gb

== Post BMX career ==
After his BMX career he became a physical education teacher Winterhill school in Rotherham.

== BMX magazine covers ==
Note: Only magazines that were in publication at the time of the racer's career(s) are listed unless specifically noted.

Fastlane BMX Mag Issue 1

Minicycle/BMX Action & Super BMX:

- None

Bicycle Motocross Action & Go:

- None

BMX Plus!:

Snap BMX Magazine & Transworld BMX:

- None

Moto Mag:

Bicycles Today & BMX Today (The official NBL publication under two names):

ABA Action, American BMXer, BMXer (The official ABA publication under three names):
