= James K. Beattie =

Australian chemist

- Occupation: Chemist
- Known for: Elected fellow of the American Association for the Advancement of Science and Royal Society of Chemistry

James K. Beattie is an Australian chemist from University of Sydney and an Elected Fellow of the American Association for the Advancement of Science and Royal Society of Chemistry.
