= Aubrey Beaty =

British Army soldier

Aubrey Beaty

Aubrey Valentine Vernon Beaty MC (1 February 1916 – 6 December 2008) was a British Army soldier who won the Military Cross for his bravery in Holland in 1944 and is thought to be the first British soldier serving with ground forces to cross the German frontier during the closing stages of the Second World War.

Beaty enlisted in the Royal Artillery in 1939 and saw action in France with the British Expeditionary Force before joining the evacuation from Dunkirk. He subsequently took part in the D-Day landings in June 1944, and was present at the liberation of Brussels and during the advance on Germany through Holland.

Beaty was born in Delhi, the son of an officer in the Indian Police. He was educated at Bedford School.

After being demobilised in 1947, he joined Condé Nast Publications and became a director of Vogue Italia. He retired to London.
