= William Beattie (photographer) =

- Born: 1864; Aberdeen, Scotland
- Died: 15 March 1931 (aged 67); Auckland, New Zealand
- Occupation: Photographer
- Years active
- Spouse: Evelyn Isobel Green
- Children: Bill Beattie (son)

William Beattie (1864 – 15 March 1931) was a New Zealand photographer. He was best known for his work for the Auckland Weekly News.

Beattie originally emigrated from Scotland to Tasmania, Australia with his brother. Both were photographers and subsequently found there was not enough trade in Hobart. In 1894, William moved to Auckland. He photographed for the Auckland Weekly News for sixteen years. Beattie managed to capture the wreckage of the Elingamite in the Three Kings in 1902. He also photographed the funeral of Sir John Logan Campbell in 1912.

After he retired from the Auckland Weekly News, Beattie remained a commercial photographer, setting up a shop in Shortland Street, Auckland.

== External sources ==
Works of Beattie are currently held in the collection of Auckland War Memorial Museum
