= James Beaty =

James Beaty may refer to:

- James Beaty Sr. (1798–1892), Canadian member of parliament, 1867–1874, published the Toronto Leader newspaper
- James Beaty Jr. (1831–1899), mayor of Toronto, 1879–1880 and member of parliament, 1880–1887
- James A. Beaty Jr. (born 1949), U.S. district judge and former federal judicial nominee to the U.S. Court of Appeals for the Fourth Circuit

== See also ==
- James Beattie (disambiguation)
- James Beatty (disambiguation)
