= George Beattie =

George Beattie may refer to:

- George Beattie (footballer) (1925–2012), Scottish footballer
- George Beattie (poet) (1786–1823), Scottish poet
- George Beattie (shooter) (1877–1953), Canadian sport shooter

== See also ==
- George Beatty (disambiguation)
