= Anthony Beattie =

British civil servant

George Anthony Beattie (17 April 1944 – 31 March 2014) was a British civil servant, born in London. He began a public service career as a development economist in Africa in the 1960s and ended it in 2004 as a Director in the UK's Department for International Development (DFID). He helped promote the application of New Public Management concepts to the UK public sector in the 1990s, both as head of the Natural Resources Institute, then part of the Overseas Development Administration, for ten years from 1986 until its transfer to the University of Greenwich in 1996, and subsequently as a member of the Efficiency and Effectiveness Unit in the Cabinet Office. From 1997 to 2004, Beattie was Ambassador and UK Permanent Representative to the UN Food and Agriculture Agencies in Rome. Among other roles in the governing bodies in Rome he was President of the Executive Board of the World Food Programme (WFP), chair of the Audit Committee of the Executive Board of the International Fund for Agricultural Development (IFAD) and Vice-Chair of the Finance Committee of the Food and Agriculture Organization (FAO). He chaired the Governance Group established by WFPs Executive Board in 1999. He has trained as a coach at Henley Management College and implemented a coaching programme in WFP. He was also active in charity governance as a chair and trustee, and was a member of the Governance Forum of the National Council of Voluntary Organisations. Prior to his death he was undertaking a consultancy for the CGIAR fund Council on resource mobilisation. He died in Johannesburg on 31 March 2014 after having had a fall in Dar es Salaam on 19 March 2014.

He is the author of Experience of Commissioning Research and Development in "Science in Government - the Rise of the Intelligent Customer", Research Investment Strategies in Selected European Countries: Lessons Learned: the UK in "Investment Strategies for Agriculture and Natural Resources" (1988), and "The governance of priorities, financing and performance in the delivery of public goods by international and regional membership organisations" (2013).
