= McCaffrey =

McCaffrey, sometimes spelled Caffrey or McCaffery, is an Irish surname. It is found mostly in the Counties Fermanagh, Monaghan, Cavan and Tyrone in the north west of Ireland. Ballymccaffrey is a townland outside Tempo in county Fermanagh. The surname is an Anglicised form of the Gaelic names Mac Gafraidh, Mac Gofraidh, which mean "son of Gafraidh", "son of Gofraidh". The Gaelic names are forms of the Old Norse Guðfróðr. Notable people with the surname include:

== People ==
=== McCaffary ===
- John McCaffary (1820–1851), murderer

=== McCaffrey ===
- Anne McCaffrey (1926–2011), science fiction author
- Billy McCaffrey (born 1971), American basketball player
- Barry McCaffrey (born 1942), military analyst, former US Army General
- Christian McCaffrey (born 1996), American football player
- Ed McCaffrey (born 1968), American football player
- Francis J. McCaffrey (1917–1989), New York politician
- Francis J. McCaffrey Jr. (1902–1972), New York politician and judge
- Frank McCaffrey, American college football All-American player
- James McCaffrey (actor) (1958-2023), American actor
- James D. McCaffrey (born 1950), software researcher
- Janice McCaffrey (born 1959), Canadian racewalker
- John McCaffrey (disambiguation), several people
- Luke McCaffrey (born 2001), American football player
- Max McCaffrey (born 1994) American football player
- Pete McCaffrey (1938–2012), American basketball player
- Stephanie McCaffrey (born 1993), American soccer forward
- Stuart McCaffrey (born 1979), Scottish footballer

=== Caffrey ===
- Andrew Augustine Caffrey, United States federal judge
- Bob Caffrey (born 1962), American baseball player
- Colm Caffrey, Irish radio broadcaster
- David Caffrey, Irish film director
- Ernie Caffrey (1936–2026), Irish politician
- James J. Caffrey, American Securities and Exchange Committee chairman
- Joe Caffrey, English actor
- John Caffrey (1891–1953), Irish recipient of the Victoria Cross
- John Caffrey, Gaelic footballer
- Mary Caffrey Low (1850–1926), women's education advocate
- Neal Caffrey (born 1977), White Collar television show character
- Paul Caffrey, Gaelic football manager
- Peter Caffrey (1949–2008), Irish actor
- Sean Caffrey (1940–2013), Northern Irish actor
- Stephen Caffrey (footballer) (born 1975), Irish footballer
- Stephen Caffrey (born 1959), American actor
- Thomas Caffrey (1917–2010), Irish chocolatier

=== Caffery ===
- John Caffery, born Fermanagh County Ireland 1670. Emigrated to Virginia 1688

. Member Virginia House of Burgesses. Great Grandfather of Capt. John Caffery.

- Capt. John Caffery, Sheriff Bedford, Virginia. Signatory to the Cumberland Compact. Son-in-law of Col. John Donelson, member Virginia House of Burgesses; co-founder of the City of Nashville, and father-in-law of President Andrew Jackson.
- Donelson Caffery I, Judge 16th JDC Louisiana. Son of Capt. John Caffery. Father of U.S. Senator Donelson Caffery II.
- Donelson Caffery II, Louisiana State Senator. U.S Senator from Louisiana. Grandfather of U.S. Representative Patrick Caffery.
- Jefferson Caffery, U.S.Ambassador to San Salvador, Colombia, Cuba, Brazil, France and Egypt. Assistant Secretary of State. 2nd Cousin of U.S. Senator Donelson Caffery II.
- Donelson Caffery III, District Attorney 16th JDC, Louisiana. Son of Donelson Caffery II. Brother of Edward Caffery and John Caffery. Uncle of Patrick Caffery.
- John Caffery, Louisiana State Senator. Son Of Donelson Caffery II. Brother of Donelson Caffery III and Edward Caffery. Uncle of U.S. Representative Patrick Caffery.
- Edward Caffery, U.S. Counsel to Bucharest, Havana, San Jose, and Niagara Falls. Brother of Donelson Caffery III, John Caffery and Uncle of Patrick Caffery.
- Patrick Caffery, Louisiana State Representative. U.S. Representative from Louisiana. Son of Ralph Earl Caffery. grandson of U.S. Senator Donelson Caffery II

== See also ==
- McAffrey, surname
- Caffrey's Irish Ale
