= Batey (surname) =

Batey /ˈbeɪteɪ/ is a surname of British origin, which may have multiple meanings. The name Batey can be a diminutive of the name Bartholomew. Alternatively, Batey may be an occupational surname for a boatman or fisherman, deriving from the Old English 'bāt' and the suffix '-ey', which loosely means "small boat". Related surnames include Bateman, Bates, and Bate. The name Batey may refer to:

- Bob Batey (1912–1988), English football player
- Derek Batey (1928–2013), British television presenter
- Joey Batey (born 1989), English actor and musician
- Joseph Batey (1867–1949), British politician
- Keith Batey (1919–2010), British codebreaker
- Kelvin Batey (born 1981), British BMX racer
- Mavis Batey (1921–2013), British codebreaker
- Peter Batey (born 1958), British businessman
- Peter Batey (director) (1933–2019) Australian actor and director

== See also ==
- Beaty (surname)
- Beatty (surname)
