= Justice Beatty =

Justice Beatty may refer to:

- Donald W. Beatty (born 1952), associate justice of the South Carolina Supreme Court
- H. O. Beatty (1812–1892), associate justice of the Supreme Court of Nevada
- Samuel A. Beatty (1923–2014), associate justice of the Supreme Court of Alabama
- William H. Beatty (1838–1914), chief justice of the Supreme Court of Nevada and later of the Supreme Court of California

== See also ==
- Judge Beatty (disambiguation)
