= John McCaffrey =

John McCaffrey may refer to:

- John McCaffrey (fundraiser) (born 1968), North Irish fundraising professional
- John McCaffrey (hurler) (born 1987), Irish hurler
- Bert McCaffrey (John Albert McCaffrey, 1893–1955), Canadian ice hockey player
- Pete McCaffrey (John Paul McCaffrey, 1938–2012), American basketball player
