= Rod Beattie (swimwear designer) =

American swimwear designer

- Born: 1959 (age 66–67); California
- Occupation: Swimwear designer

Rod Beattie (1959) is an American swimwear designer. His swimsuit designs are sold at stores throughout the United States. Beattie designed for La Blanca and Anne Cole Collection for 25 years. He launched his own swimwear label, "Bleu/Rod Beattie", in the summer of 2011.

== Early life and education ==
Beattie was born in California. Before he attended Otis College of Art and Design, he was part of his high school's swim team.

== Career ==
After graduation in 1986, Beattie designed sportswear at several contemporary houses in Los Angeles, including Theodore and Max Studio. In 1988 he began to design swimwear for La Blanca, helping the company to increase sales to about $30 million.

After six years with La Blanca, Beattie began on to design swimwear for the Anne Cole Collection, which at the time was a division of Warnaco. In March 1999, Beattie left Anne Cole Collection, joining La Blanca as head designer with his name now on the label. For the next ten years, La Blanca by Rod Beattie was the top-selling retail swimwear label in the United States.

At the end of 2010, Beattie collaborated with swimwear manufacturer A. H. Schreiber to create a new swimwear brand "Bleu/Rod Beattie", with sales beginning in 2011.

In 2014 Beattie sold the Bleu/Rod Beattie line to Amerex Group.

== Special Projects ==
Beattie mentors students at Otis College of Art and Design, helping them develop swimwear designs during a semester long swimwear assignment which are showcased at an annual fashion show.
