= David N. Johnson =

American organist, composer, and educator (1922–1987)

- Born: June 28, 1922; San Antonio, Texas, U.S.
- Died: August 2, 1987 (aged 65); Tempe, Arizona, U.S.
- Education: Curtis Institute of Music; Trinity University (BMus); Syracuse University (MMus, PhD)
- Occupations: Organist; composer; educator; choral clinician; lecturer
- Employers: Syracuse University; St. Olaf College
- Style: Classical; liturgical music
- Spouse: Margaret S. Teal
- Children: 6
- Military career
- Allegiance: United States
- Branch: U.S. Army
- Unit: U.S. Army Signal Corps
- Awards: Meritorious Service Award

David N. Johnson (June 28, 1922 – August 2, 1987) was an American organist, composer, educator, choral clinician, and lecturer.

== Biography ==
Johnson was born in San Antonio, Texas, in 1922. He studied organ and composition at the Curtis Institute of Music (1940–1942). Between 1942 and 1946, he served in the U.S. Army Signal Corps / Air Corps in India, Burma, and China, receiving a Meritorious Service Award and campaign ribbons. He continued his music studies at Trinity University (BMus 1950) and Syracuse University (MMus 1951, PhD 1956). He also held the associate certificate from the American Guild of Organists (AAGO).

In 1951, he was a lecturer at Syracuse University. From 1960–1967, he was college organist and organ instructor at St. Olaf College, Northfield, Minnesota. He was named music department chair at St. Olaf in 1965. In 1967, he succeeded Arthur Poister as professor of music and university organist at Syracuse University. He moved to Arizona in 1969, where he taught at Arizona State University in Tempe. He died in Tempe on August 2, 1987. He was married to Margaret S. Teal and was the father of six children.

== Works ==
Johnson published well over 300 compositions, most of them for church use, and was author of an Instruction Book for Beginning Organists (1964) and an Organ Teacher's Guide (1971).

Johnson's "Trumpet Tune in D" (1962) is the opening and closing theme for the weekly radio show With Heart and Voice, hosted by Peter DuBois. The theme was also the first of two processionals used for the 1971 wedding of Richard Nixon's daughter Tricia, who was married in the White House Rose Garden with music provided by a string orchestra. Since this work was originally composed for organ, it was transcribed for string orchestra for its performance at the wedding.

Several of Johnson's Trumpet Tunes have been recorded by Christopher Herrick in his Organ Fireworks series on Hyperion Records.

Johnson's best known vocal/choral work is "The Lone, Wild Bird". It was inspired, in part, by his seeing a solitary white bird while en route by ship (in the early 1940s) from Los Angeles to Bombay, India, hundreds of miles from the nearest land in the middle of the South Pacific. Haunted by the image of that bird, Johnson later paired an American folk tune, "Prospect" from the Sacred Harp (1844), with a 1925 poem by the Rev. Richard McFayden (also McFadyen), entitled "The Lone, Wild Fowl", also taking some poetic license with the title. It first appeared in "Twelve Folksongs and Spirituals" (1968), compiled and arranged by Johnson. The pairing is so natural that many assume it is the tune's original text, and vice versa.
