= William Francis Beattie =

Scottish sculptor

William Francis Beattie R.F.A. MC (23 November 1886 – 3 October 1918) was a Scottish sculptor killed in the closing weeks of the First World War. His most famous work is the 1514 Memorial in Hawick: a memorial to Hawick Callants killed in a skirmish at Hornshole in the aftermath battle following the Battle of Flodden.

== Life ==
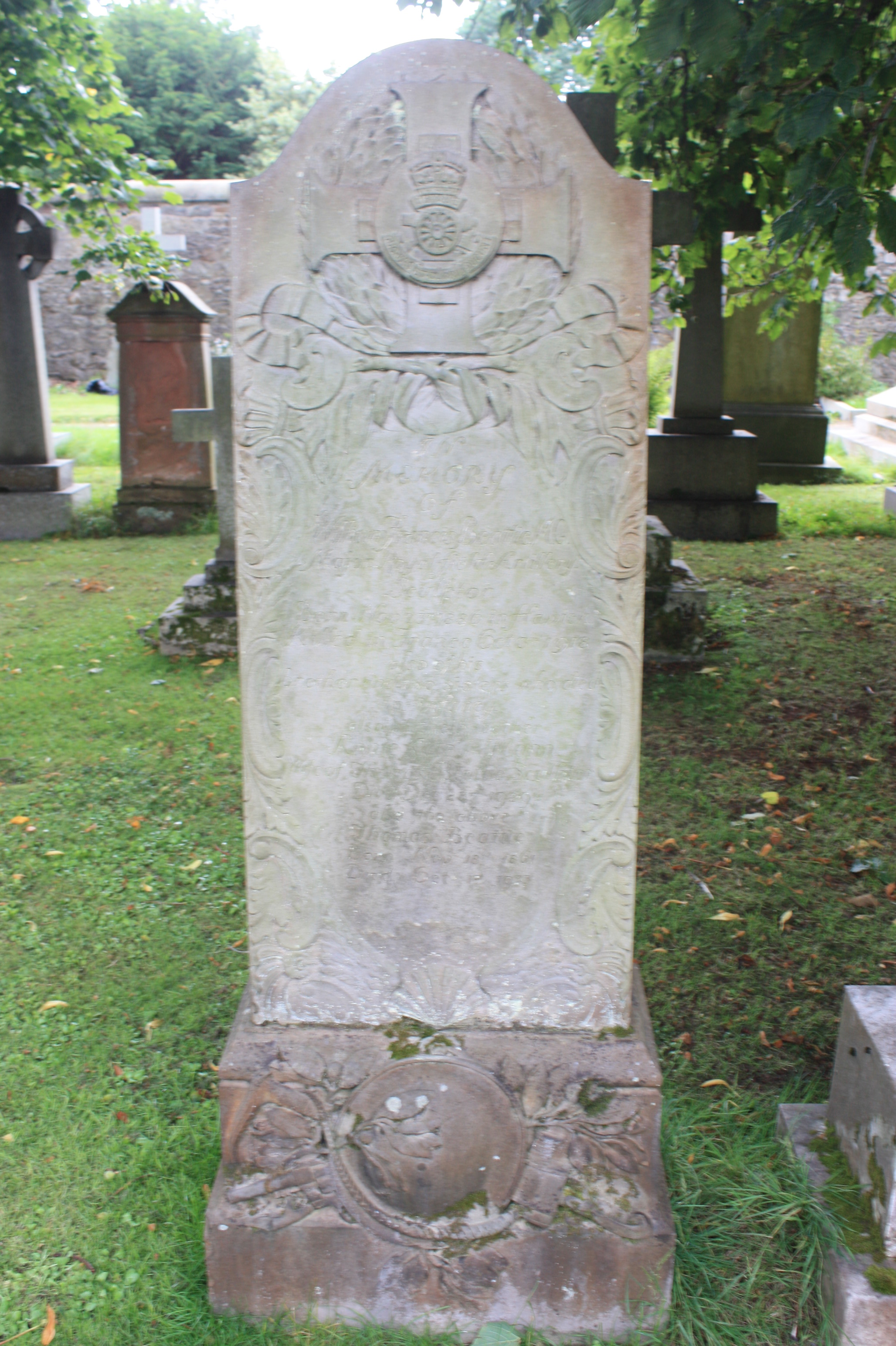
Memorial text to William Francis Beattie is carved on the gravestone of his parents in Dean Cemetery, Edinburgh

He was born in Hawick on 23 November 1886, the son of Annie Kate McMann and Thomas Beattie (1861–1933), a local sculptor, whose most notable work includes the interior of the Usher Hall and the war memorial at Carnoustie. William’s grandfather had been a local pioneer of photography.

William was educated at George Watson’s College and then the Edinburgh School of Art. Around 1901 he began actively sculpting in Edinburgh, first working from a studio at 109 Haymarket Terrace, then in 1912 moving to the more prestigious Dean Studios on Belford Road. Whilst his work clearly is of great quality only one public work is known, it is therefore presumed that he specialised in figurative work as largely private commissions.

In 1910 he joined the Territorial branch of the Lothian and Border Horse Regiment. As a territorial, he was immediately called into service at the onset of the First World War. He transferred as a Lieutenant to the Royal Field Artillery and won the Military Cross from bravery in November 1917 for the rescue of two men from the battlefield during the Second Battle of Passchendaele. He was thereafter promoted to the rank of Major. He fought at the Battle of Loos, Ypres and the Somme and had at least suffered due to a one gas attack (in April 1918).

He died of wounds at a field hospital near Joncourt on 3 October 1918, a few weeks before the end of the war, during the Hundred Days Offensive. He is buried in Tincourt New British Cemetery near Peronne, Somme (grave ref V J 27). His parents are noted as living at 41 Lothian Road in Edinburgh at the time of his death.

He is memorialised on his parents grave in the north section of Dean Cemetery in western Edinburgh.

== Known works ==
- Grave of Charles Simson Rankine Simson, Dean Cemetery 1912
- The 1514 Memorial, Hawick This memorial was unveiled on 4 June 1914.
