= Gene Schoor =

- Born: July 26, 1914; Passaic, New Jersey
- Died: December 13, 2000 (aged 86); New York, New York
- Education: University of Miami
- Occupations: Writer, boxing promoter, restaurateur
- Writing career
- Language: English
- Genre: Primarily "juvenile" sports biographies
- Subjects: Sports and athletes; occasionally politicians
- Notable work: Young John Kennedy

Eugene R. Schoor (July 26, 1914 – December 13, 2000) was a New York-based author, ghost-writer, college boxing instructor (New York University, the University of Minnesota, and City College of New York), Florida state amateur boxing title holder, Navy Public Information Officer, public relations man, sports agent, boxing promoter, and restaurateur. He is best known as the author of "juvenile" sports biographies.

== Career ==
=== Early life (amateur boxer, PR man, radio producer) ===
Schoor attended the University of Miami in Coral Gables, Florida. He began boxing no later than April 1933, when he won a bout as a welterweight. While in college, he won the Florida state lightweight amateur boxing title (under the name "Eugene Schoor"). He also fought as a middleweight.

After serving in the Navy in World War II, Schoor began a PR business in New York. His clients included Jayne Mansfield, Cindy Adams and Bess Myerson. He expanded into radio, producing "Champ of the Week," "Sports Club of the Air," and "Hour of Champions," and using radio to promote client-athletes including Joe DiMaggio, Jack Dempsey, Tommy Henrich and Phil Rizzuto.

=== Writer ===
A prolific author of more than fifty books during five decades, Gene Schoor specialized in "juvenile" sports biographies but also wrote a variety of other work, including a successful pre-assassination biography of John F. Kennedy.

A representative list of Schoor's "juvenile" non-fiction, once found on the shelves of elementary school libraries across the United States, would include The Story of Ty Cobb: Baseball's Greatest Player (1952), The Ted Williams Story, Christy Mathewson: Baseball's Greatest Pitcher, Roy Campanella: Man of Courage, The Story of Yogi Berra, Mickey Mantle of the Yankees, Willie Mays: Modest Champion, Bob Feller: Hall of Fame Strikeout Star, and The Stan Musial Story.

Gene Schoor also wrote the best-seller Young John Kennedy (June 1963), a book for adults which drew on extensive interviews with Kennedy intimates and letters from Kennedy to his family. (Schoor may have come to the attention of the Kennedys after sending Robert F. Kennedy a number of his sports biographies; Kennedy thanked Schoor in a letter of March 1961, commenting on "our mutual interest" in sports.)

After describing his childhood enthusiasm for Schoor's work—typical of his generation of school children—best-selling sports author and sports-PR executive Marty Appel wrote, "Give [Schoor] the player’s year by year stats, throw in some good newspaper clips with some quotes about how the scout discovered him, create some locker room conversation between the star and his manager, sprinkle in some self-doubt after that .222 average in the first month of the rookie season, and bang, you had a 190-page book at $4.95 with a handful of some of the team’s best free publicity photos tucked in."

Journalist Jeff Kallman adds: "If you are my age, and you became a baseball fan early enough in childhood, you probably know the name Gene Schoor. He wrote a library's worth of sports biographies for children in the 1950s and early 1960s.... Schoor's technique ... involved mulcting as many newspaper and/or magazine articles as he could find about his subject, using the creamier quotes, making sure they included tales of how his subject was scouted, a quote or three in which our hero had his doubts, and as much rah-rah in the triumph as could be tolerated short of a need for Tums.... [T]he books were hits and they did give a lot of kids an entree into reading by way of their game."

According to Appel, one-time sports biographer Milton Shapiro wrote Appel and claimed to have been a ghost-writer for Schoor: "Shapiro says he was actually the writer of the biographies of Leo Durocher, Joe DiMaggio and Pee Wee Reese. And when he asked Schoor for more money and a co-author credit on [the biography of] Bob Feller, he was turned down and 'quit.'"

=== Restaurant owner and boxing promoter ===
In 1959, Schoor and three others (former boxers Bill Nicholson, Sy Krieg, and Phil Krupin, whom Schoor met in Paris after they all served in World War Two) financed the New York City Second Avenue restaurant Johnny Johnston's Steakhouse.

Later, while interviewing President Kennedy, Schoor lamented the lack of opportunity given to American youth; Schoor claimed that the President replied, "We['ve] got millions of opportunities for kids. But they['ve] got to be shown, they['ve] got to be guided, they['ve] got to be helped. If you get the kids when they're young, why, hell, the kid walking down the street could be ... the next heavyweight champion of the world."

Inspired, Schoor's restaurant group formed Kid Galahad Boxers to invest in and nurture the careers of young, unknown boxers. To attract talent, in January 1962 they bought an ad in the New York Times which began: "$10,000 A YEAR WHILE YOU LEARN. A newly formed syndicate of sportsmen and businessmen is anxious to sponsor the next heavyweight champion. This group of sportsmen will underwrite all expenses of the chosen candidates and will pay a salary of $10,000 a year for the full training period. If you are between 19 and 25 years of age—if you weigh upwards of 186 pounds—if you are at least 6 feet tall—then you qualify for an interview."

Intrigued by the ad, the Times phoned Schoor. "I started to ad-lib right there," Schoor recalled; at the time (as Sports Illustrated later put it), his group "had little more than an idea, a restaurant and a shoeshine." Greatly exaggerating, Schoor told the Times he had "a syndicate and we've got $100,000." The Times ran a long Sunday article about the subject, and "[t]he phones never stopped ringing for a week.... There were letters, phone calls, wires from all over the country, from Australia, Germany, every place. We were struggling to run a new restaurant, and we didn't know where the hell we'd get any kind of money. My partners said, 'Hey, what ... are we gonna do about all this?'"

Without money, they did nothing. Three months later, however, "a wealthy New York construction man" offered to sponsor construction jobs at $158 a week (more than $1250 in 2017 dollars), which Schoor's group advertised as financial assistance to any suitable prospect "while he learns to be the next world champion." Six men were hired for such jobs, while more than forty others were trained and promoted in professional bouts. The group's first major prospect (but at least fiftieth client) was James J. Beattie; at 6 feet 8 3/4 inches and 240 pounds, he was said at the time to be "the biggest boxer to ever enter the ring." Beattie won his professional debut with a knockout only 24 seconds into the first round, and went on to win 41 fights. (He also appeared (billed as "Jim Beattie") in the Hollywood film The Great White Hope as the eponymous boxer.)

=== Litigation ===
In 1960, Schoor sued former heavyweight boxing champion Rocky Marciano, claiming that Marciano had punched him during a dispute over Schoor's work as Marciano's ghost-writer. "I passed out," Schoor alleged in his court complaint; "Bells have been ringing in my head ever since and I had a fuzzy feeling for weeks." Although Marciano denied the claim, in April 1963 a New York court awarded Schoor $5000 damages (more than $30,000 in 2011 dollars).

In 1975 Schoor was engaged in a dispute over the sale of letters from a young John Kennedy to his parents, which Schoor had used extensively in his work.

In 1994, Schoor sued Kennedy biographer Nigel Hamilton and publisher Random House for $20 million, claiming that material in the defendants' best-selling book JFK: Reckless Youth had been appropriated, without payment or proper acknowledgment, from Schoor's research files (including extensive interview notes). Schoor was represented by "heavyweight lawyer" (the New York Times' phrase) Barry Slotnick.

== Death ==
According to Appel, "The last two years of his life were spent at a home for the aged in Manhattan. His wife had died, he had no other family [note: Appel adds a postscript suggesting Schoor had an illegitimate son], and the nursing home costs depleted all of his remaining money. Kind people at the home tried to sell his remaining author copies of his own books to get him some spending cash, but he was suffering from mild dementia and lacked memory recall." Schoor died on December 13, 2000.

== Partial list of books (written, co-written, or edited) ==
- The Giant Book of Sports, Garden City Publishing, 1948.
- Picture Story of Franklin Delano Roosevelt, Fell, 1950.
- The Thrilling Story of Joe DiMaggio, Fell, 1950.
- General Douglas MacArthur: A Pictorial Biography, Rudolph Field, 1951.
- Sugar Ray Robinson, Greenburg, 1951.
- The Jim Thorpe Story: America's Greatest Athlete, Messner, 1951.
- Red Grange: Football's Greatest Halfback, Messner, 1952.
- The Story of Ty Cobb: Baseball's Greatest Player, Messner, 1952.
- Casey Stengel: Baseball's Greatest Manager, Messner, 1953.
- Christy Mathewson: Baseball's Greatest Pitcher, Messner, 1953.
- The Ted Williams Story, Messner, 1954.
- The Stan Musial Story, Messner, 1955.
- The Leo Durocher Story, Messner, 1955 [possibly ghost-written by Milton Shapiro].
- Joe DiMaggio: The Yankee Clipper, Messner, 1956 [possibly ghost-written by Milton Shapiro].
- The Pee Wee Reese Story, Messner, 1956 [possibly ghost-written by Milton Shapiro].
- The Jack Dempsey Story, Nicholas Kaye, 1956.
- Jackie Robinson: Baseball Hero, Putnam, 1958.
- Bob Turley: Fireball Pitcher, Putnam, 1959.
- Mickey Mantle of the Yankees, Putnam, 1959.
- Roy Campanella: Man of Courage, Putnam, 1959.
- Lew Burdette of the Braves, Putnam, 1960.
- Willy Mays: Modest Champion, Putnam, 1960.
- The Red Schoendienst Story, Putnam, 1961.
- Bob Feller: Hall of Fame Strikeout Star, Doubleday, 1962 [possibly ghost-written or co-written by Milton Shapiro].
- A Treasury of Notre Dame Football, Funk, 1962.
- Young John Kennedy, Harcourt, 1963.
- The Army-Navy Game: A Treasury of Football Classics, Dodd, 1967.
- Courage Makes the Champion, Van Nostrand, 1967.
- Young Robert Kennedy, McGraw, 1969.
- Football's Greatest Coach: Vince Lombardi, Doubleday, 1974.
- Track and Field for Young Champions, McGraw, 1974.
- Lüchow's German Festival Cookbook, Doubleday, 1976 (with wife, Fran Schoor) [Gene Schoor did PR for Lüchow's, a restaurant].
- The Story of Yogi Berra, Doubleday, 1976.
- Marilyn and Joe DiMaggio (by Robin Moore and Gene Schoor), Manor Books, 1977.
- Bart Starr: A Biography, Doubleday, 1977.
- Babe Didrikson, the World's Greatest Woman Athlete, Doubleday, 1978.
- Joe DiMaggio: A Biography, Doubleday, 1980.
- Billy Martin: The Story of Baseball's Unpredictable Genius, Doubleday, 1980.
- The Scooter: The Phil Rizzuto Story, Scribner, 1982.
- Dave Winfield: The 23 Million Dollar Man, Stein & Day, 1982.
- The Complete Dodgers Record Book, Facts on File, 1984.
- A Pictorial History of the Dodgers: Brooklyn to Los Angeles, Scribner, 1984.
- Complete Yankees Record Book, Facts on File, 1985.
- Complete Red Sox Record Book, Facts on File, 1985.
- Yogi: A Fascinating Biography of One of Baseball's Most Illustrious Hall-of-Famers, Morrow, 1985.
- Seaver: A Biography, Contemporary Books, 1986.
- One Hundred Years of Notre Dame Football, Morrow, 1987.
- 100 Years of Army-Navy Football, Henry Holt, 1989.
- The History of the World Series: The Complete Chronology of America's Greatest Sports Tradition, W. Morrow, 1990.
- 100 Years of Alabama Football: A Century of Champions, Alabama Football, 1892–1992, Longstreet Press, 1991.
- 100 Years of Texas Longhorn Football, Taylor Pub. Co., 1993.
- The Fightin' Texas Aggies: 100 Years of A & M Football, Taylor Pub. Co., 1994.
- The Illustrated History of Mickey Mantle, Carroll & Graf Publishers, 1996.
