= Robert M. Beattie =

English gastroenterologist

Dr Robert Mark Beattie
- Born: 25 January 1962 (age 64); Carlisle, Cumberland, England
- Occupation: Physician

Dr Robert Mark Beattie (born 25 January 1962) is a paediatric consultant Gastroenterologist working at Southampton General Hospital since April 2000; he is now clinical lead in his field.

He has published peer-reviewed articles in the fields of gastroenterology and nutrition and is the author of the paediatrics volume of the medical best-seller series of PASTEST MRCPCH Essential Revision books.

In February 2012, he became editor in chief of Archives of Disease in Childhood, a peer-reviewed paediatric medical journal. The journal is part of the BMJ group.
