= Anaplastic carcinoma =

Type of malignant neoplasm

Anaplastic carcinoma is a general term for a malignant neoplasm arising from the uncontrolled proliferation of transformed cells of epithelial origin, or showing some epithelial characteristics, but that reveal no cytological or architectural features associated with more differentiated tumors, such as the glandular formation or special cellular junctions that are typical of adenocarcinoma and squamous cell carcinoma, respectively. Anaplasia in a tumor may be focal or diffuse.

Specific types include:

- anaplastic astrocytoma
- anaplastic large-cell lymphoma
- anaplastic meningioma
- anaplastic thyroid cancer
