= William Beattie (physician) =

Scottish physician and poet

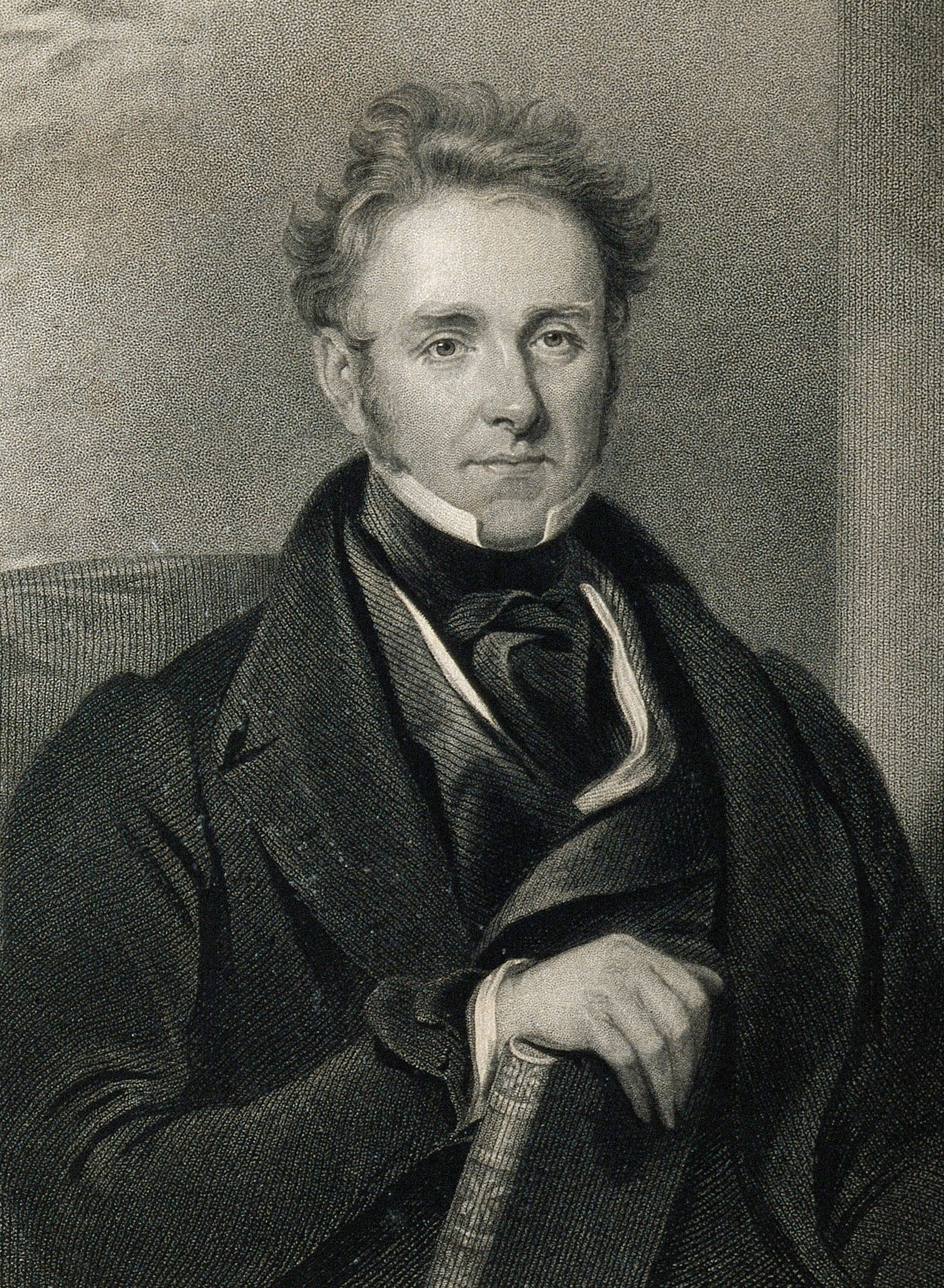
- Born: 1793; Dalton, Annandale, Scotland
- Died: 17 March 1875 (aged 81–82); London, England

William Beattie (1793 – 17 March 1875) was a Scottish physician, and poet.

== Life ==
His father, James Beattie, was educated as an architect and surveyor, but his occupation was that of a builder. He died in an accident in 1809. It has been said that his son inherited from him his classical, and from his mother his poetical, tendencies. The Beatties lived in Dumfriesshire for several generations.

When just fourteen he went to school at Clarencefield Academy in Dumfriesshire, and during his stay there of six years, under the rector, Mr. Thomas Fergusson, attained a competent knowledge of Latin, Greek, and French. In 1812 he became a medical student at Edinburgh University, and took his M.D. degree with credit in 1818. He helped to keep himself at the university by undertaking, during a portion of his college course, the mastership of the parochial school at Cleish, Kinross-shire, and other kinds of tuition. Of his university days he says:

At college I acquired the usual accomplishments of young men of my own humble standing in society. I danced with "Doigt," wrestled and fenced with Roland, read to a rich dotard in the evenings, and sat up night after night to make up for lost time, and then took a walk on the Calton Hill as a substitute for sleep; but even then, when surrounded by gay and brilliant companions, I never forgot my religious duties, and the God whom I remembered in my youth has not forsaken me in my old age.

He remained in Edinburgh for two years after taking his diploma, living chiefly 'out of his inkhorn', teaching, lecturing, translating, and conducting a small private practice. During this period he wrote The Lay of a Graduate, Rosalie, and The Swiss Relic.

Afterwards he practised medicine in Cumberland, and in 1822 was in London preparing to settle in Russia. He abandoned this project after becoming engaged to be married to a young lady of fortune, and "no inconsiderable attractions", Miss Elizabeth Limner. He spent three months in Paris, attending the hospitals, then returned to London, was married in the autumn of 1822. He was about to start a medical practice at Dover when he received a summons from the Duke of Clarence (afterwards William IV), to whom he had been introduced to by Admiral Child, a connection of Mrs. Beattie's, to attend the duke's family on a visit to the courts of Germany. At the end of winter he resumed his studies in Paris, and spent the next two years travelling and studying in Italy, Switzerland, and on the Rhine.

At the end of 1824 he entered upon a medical practice at Worthing (the salubrity of whose climate he recommended in a pamphlet published in 1858), but left it in the following March to again accompany the Duke and Duchess of Clarence to Germany. On this occasion, at Göttingen, he made the acquaintance of Blumenbach, of whom he says:

Though I have been in company with some of the prime spirits of the age, I have met none from whose conversation I have derived so much solid and original information.

He also busied himself in investigating the medicinal properties of the most renowned German spas. While recrossing the Channel in October on the steamer Comet he was nearly wrecked on the Goodwin Sands. On his return to London he published The Heliotrope and The Courts of Germany, which he completed in a new edition in 1838.

Early in 1826 for the third time he formed one of the suite of the Duke of Clarence on a German visit, and ingratiated himself with Charlotte, the Queen of Wurtemberg and Princess Royal of Great Britain. When she visited England he was sent for to attend her at Hampton Court and Windsor. He repaid her majesty's good opinion with a flattering memoir of her in 1829. The only recompense Dr. Beattie ever received for all his services to the Duke of Clarence, extending over some fourteen years, including, three years as a private secretary, were a service of silver plate and a letter certifying him to be "a perfect gentleman". Dr. Beattie, however, appears to have been grateful. The duchess added "a pair of bracelets for Mrs. Beattie, knit by her own hands", and, after her coronation, a gold medallion, as a mark of her majesty's esteem and regard; while the King of Prussia, whom he had professionally attended, also sent him a gold medallion accompanied by "a complimentary autograph letter".

In 1827, Dr. Beattie was admitted a licentiate of the Royal College of Physicians, London, and established himself in Hampstead, where for eighteen years he enjoyed an extensive practice. In 1836 and 1836 he travelled in Switzerland and in the land of the Waldenses, and in the former year was in Paris at the time of Fieschi's attempt upon the life of Louis-Philippe, and in the immediate vicinity of the explosion. He was a frequent contributor to periodicals, and during this period he published two poems — John Huss and "Polynesia" — Ports and Harbours of the Danube, and a series of descriptive and historical works, beautifully illustrated by his friend and fellow traveller, the well-known W. H. Bartlett, on "Switzerland", "Scotland", "The Waldenses", Castles and Abbeys of England, and The Danube. He also edited the Scenic Annual, for which the poet Campbell was supposed to be responsible, 'Beckett's Dramatic Works', and Lives of Eminent Conservative Statesmen. Of the Scenic Annual a leading critical journal observed, "The name of Campbell is a sufficient pledge for its poetic character"; while Beattie, in a memorandum for the year 1838, wrote: "Published Scenic Annual by which I gained for Campbell £200 clear; all the pieces, three excepted, are mine". Scotland Illustrated passed through several editions, and elicited the acknowledgement from its publisher, Mr. Virtue, 'that the prosperity he had attained was mainly owing to Dr. Beattie's literary assistance'.

In 1833, Dr. Beattie was introduced by her biographer, Madden, to the Countess of Blessington, and became her friend. She frequently availed herself of his services as a poetical contributor to her Book of Beauty and other annuals, bestowing upon him in return for his verses 'a large amount of fluent flattery, and a general invitation to Seymour Place for any "evenings between ten and half-past twelve", a privilege of which Beattie could not avail himself in consequence of the state of his eyes. When Lady Blessington was deserted by many, Beattie remained her firm friend. Madden tells us that "the very last letter, a very short time before the crash at Gore House, was one of entreaty for his exertions among the publishers to procure for her 'any kind of literary employment;' and the answer to that application was a letter of pain at the failure of every effort to accomplish her wishes". Beattie's relations with Lady Byron also would appear to have been confidential. A friend of Beattie's, whose obituary of him may be found in the Dumfriesshire and Galloway Herald (24 March 1876), says that Beattie told him that Lady Byron "had imparted to him the true reason of her separation from her husband, and that it was not the one given by Mrs. Stowe".

Dr. Beattie was close with Thomas Campbell, and was selected by the poet as his biographer, an office which he discharged in 1849 by the publication of The Life and Letters of Thomas Campbell, in three volumes. In 1833 Beattie speaks of Campbell as coming to take up his quarters at Rose Villa, Beattie's cottage at Hampstead, where on former occasions he had experienced much benefit, and adds: 'These visits in after life were frequently repeated, and whenever he found himself relapsing into a depressed state of health and sprints, "Well," he would say, "I must come into hospital," and he would repair for another week to "Campbell's Ward," a room so named by the poet in the doctor's house'. In 1842 Campbells Pilgrim of Glencoe appeared, dedicated "To William Beattie, M.D., in remembrance of long subsisting and mutual friendship". Both as physician and friend Beattie seems to have been the great stay of the poet's declining years. On hearing of Campbell's illness in 1844, Beattie hastened to his bedside at Boulogne, and never left him until all was over. Campbell's cherished wish to find his last resting-place in Westminster Abbey would probably never have been realised but for Beattie, nor would a statue have been placed in 'Poets' Corner' to his memory had Beattie not collected contributions for it, and made good a considerable deficit out of his own pocket. He was also close with Samuel Rogers, who attributed his longevity to the care and vigilance of his physician, and who requested him to perform for him the same sad office Beattie had discharged for Campbell – that of closing his eyes in death. His intercourse with Rogers was, however, far less close than that with Campbell.

In 1845 Beattie's wife died, and soon afterwards he gave up regular practice as a physician; but he continued for the rest of his life to give medical advice to clergymen, men of letters, and others without accepting professional fees. He also occupied his time with works of charity. In 1846 he published, for instance, a memoir of his friend Bartlett for the benefit of the artist's family, which raised £400, and through his influence with the prime minister obtained a pension of £76 a year for his widow. This was the last of his systematic literary works, but he continued to contribute papers to the Archæological Society, and to write articles for the reviews.

Beattie's only strictly professional work, unless we include his pamphlet on Home Climates and Worthing, was a Latin treatise on pulmonary consumption, the subject of his M.D. thesis at Edinburgh. Some of his works were translated into German and French. He was foreign secretary to the British Archæological Society, fellow of the Ethnological Society, member of the Historical Institute, and of the Institut d'Afrique, Paris.

Dr. Beattie lost £7,000 due to the failure of the Albert Assurance office. This was a great shock, and may have accelerated his end; but he bore the loss with manly fortitude, and all he said in reference to it (to a writer in the Medical Times) was that "he should be obliged to give up his charitable donations to the amount of £300 a year'. Dr. Beattie's own verdict on his laborious, painstaking, benevolent, and interesting life, "Laboriosè vixi nihil agendo", is much more modest than correct. He died on 17 March 1875, at 13 Upper Berkeley Street, Portman Square, at the age of eighty-two, and was buried by the side of his wife in Brighton. He had no children. It is understood that he left an autobiography, which has not yet seen the light.

His papers are held at the New York Public Library.

== In popular culture ==
He is portrayed by Lewis Mackinnon in "The King Over the Water" episode of TV series Victoria.
