= Missing Persons =

A missing person is a person who has disappeared for usually unknown reasons

Missing Person(s) or Missing People may also refer to:

- Missing persons (Pakistan), referring to the enforced disappearances in Pakistan during the military dictatorship of Pervez Musharraf
- Missing Persons (band), an American rock band
- Missing Persons (TV series), an American TV series (1993–94)
- Missing Persons (Terriers), an episode of the TV series Terriers
- The First 48: Missing Persons, documentary episode of the TV show The First 48
- The Missing Person, a 2009 American film
- Missing Person (novel) (French: Rue des Boutiques Obscures), a 1978 French novel by Patrick Modiano
- Missing People, UK charity
- The Missing People, 1940 film
- Missing Persons, a song by Go West from their self-titled album

== See also ==
- Mising people, a South Asian ethnic group
- International Commission on Missing Persons
  - List of missing people organizations
- "Of Missing Persons", short story by Jack Finney
- Missing Persons Unit, Australian TV documentary
- Bureau of Missing Persons, American comedic film
