= Slow Burn (1986 film) =

- Genre: Drama; Thriller
- Based on: Castles Burning by Arthur Lyons
- Screenplay by: Matthew Chapman
- Directed by: Matthew Chapman
- Starring: Eric Roberts; Beverly D'Angelo; Raymond J. Barry; Johnny Depp; Victoria Catlin
- Theme music composer: Loek Dikker
- Country of origin: United States
- Original language: English

Production
- Executive producers: Joel Schumacher; Stefanie Staffin Kowal
- Producer: Mark Levinson
- Production location: Palm Springs
- Cinematography: Tim Suhrstedt
- Editor: Battle Davis
- Running time: 92 minutes
- Production companies: Castles Burning Productions Inc. MCA Pay Television; Universal Pay Television

Original release
- Network: Showtime Network
- Release: June 29, 1986

Slow Burn is a 1986 American film noir television movie for Showtime presented by Joel Schumacher (as executive producer) and directed by Matthew Chapman, who adapted the screenplay from the novel Castles Burning by Arthur Lyons. The cast includes Eric Roberts, Beverly D'Angelo, Dennis Lipscomb, Raymond J. Barry, Johnny Depp, Anne Schedeen, Henry Gibson, Victoria Catlin, and Dan Hedaya.

== Plot ==
Jacob Asch (Roberts) is hired by Gerald McMurty (Barry) to find his ex-wife Laine and their son in Palm Springs. Jacob finds Laine and a teenager named Donnie who may or may not be Gerald's son. He also finds an intricate web of deceit and betrayal that lead to death. He takes it upon himself to unravel the mystery and find out who is killing people and why.

== Production ==
Johnny Depp appeared as Donnie Fleischer, the missing, insightful, rich son of McMurty who only wants to be loved. The film was set and shot in Palm Springs, California.
