= Quitters, Inc. =

- Short story by Stephen King
- Country: United States
- Language: English
- Genres: Horror, suspense short story

Publication
- Published in: Night Shift
- Publisher: Doubleday
- Media type: Print (Paperback)
- Publication date: 1978

"Quitters, Inc." is a short story by Stephen King published as part of his 1978 short story collection Night Shift. Unlike most other stories in this book, "Quitters, Inc." had been previously unpublished until February 1978 under Doubleday Publishing. It was featured in Edward D. Hoch's 1979 "Best detective stories of the year" collection. The plot follows Dick Morrison's discovery of the brutal enforcement methods used by Quitters, Inc., the firm which he enlists to aid him quit smoking. Like much of Stephen King's work, this short story exhibits elements of horror fiction and gothic fiction. The tale was adapted in the 1985 American anthology horror film Cat’s Eye.

== Plot ==
Richard "Dick" Morrison, a middle-aged smoker, is at John F. Kennedy International Airport when he encounters Jimmy McCann, his old college roommate and advertisement agency coworker. McCann, who had been a heavy smoker in college, credits a firm called Quitters, Inc. for helping him give it up and recommends that Dick try their services. The firm has a 98% success rate and guarantees that the person will quit smoking forever. Dick, who works in advertising, is reluctant as he has never seen this firm advertised in billboards or print media, to which McCann says it is a small firm with all the clients they can handle solely by word of mouth. Before leaving, McCann gives a business card to Dick.

A month later, when Dick is not happy in his job, he resorts to drinking, and Jimmy McCann's business card falls out of Dick's wallet when he pays the bartender. As the address is close to the bar, Dick decides to go to Quitters, Inc. on a whim. Dick is introduced to Victor Donatti, who will be his quitting counselor. Donatti tells the history of Quitters, Inc., that it was founded by a New Jersey mob boss who had been a heavy smoker and realized, before he died of lung cancer, that he must aid others in quitting. Dick is still uneasy, especially as Donatti asks many questions about the Morrison family without revealing the methods used.

The following day, Donatti states to Morrison that they have found out all the relevant information about his family. Although Donatti assures Morrison that Quitters, Inc. holds clients' personal information in the strictest confidence, Dick is disgusted and shocked at what has been discovered. Donatti then shows Dick their method: aversion training, demonstrated by electrocuting a rabbit so it would be trained not to eat. Donatti warns Dick that he will be under surveillance and if he is caught smoking, Dick's family will be sent to the "rabbit room".

For the first month, Dick will have round-the-clock surveillance to ensure he is not smoking, and for the second and third months, the surveillance drops down to 18 hours a day ("but you will never know which eighteen", cautions Donatti). During the fourth month (when relapses often occur) the surveillance goes back up to 24 hours. From the fifth month until one year in the program, the surveillance will be reduced to 12 hours a day. After that, the surveillance consists of random checks for the remainder of his life. The brutal enforcement methods used by Quitters, Inc. are non-fatal electric shocks of increasing intensity to his wife, Cindy, a second infraction to him, and the third the both of them. A fourth infraction would involve beatings to his son, and subsequent infractions would result in more trips to the shock room with higher voltage, and more painful beatings of his son and wife. After the ninth infraction, his son's arms would be broken. Finally, if Dick commits a 10th infraction, he would be shot dead, with Donatti remarking "he would become part of the unregenerate 2%". He ends by showing Dick a gun and affirming the guarantee that even the 2% "would never smoke again".

Donatti says that Morrison should not worry too much about the torture, as 40% of Quitters, Inc. clients never violate the agreement at all, and only 10% are subject to a fourth or greater infraction. Donatti says Morrison's greatest problem will probably be temptation as a result of availability, as there is a newspaper stand in the lobby of the very building Quitters, Inc. is situated, and they sell all cigarette brands. Dick's desire to relapse is overcome by fear of the surveillance and torture, which he conceals from his wife in order not to frighten her.

Months go by, and Dick is faithful to his resolve to quit smoking, even during a point when he drank excessively at a party; he is still sober enough to decline an offer for a smoke. He gradually loses the physical jitters of quitting, but the psychological craving for tobacco stays strong. One day during a stressful traffic jam, Dick's desire overtakes him, and he finds an old pack of cigarettes in the glove compartment, lights a cigarette, but stubs it out after only three drags. After the traffic clears, Dick comes home to an empty house and a call from Donatti informing him that they have his wife. Dick heads to Quitters, Inc. only to be restrained by a Mafia enforcer and watches as Cindy is shocked at a low setting. After the shocking, Dick speaks with Cindy in private, who is forgiving and supportive that, according to her, Donatti has "let him out of a prison".

Shortly after the shocking, Dick has gained weight, and Donatti obtains some prohibited diet pills for him to achieve a target weight. If Dick strays from this goal, Donatti threatens that his wife's right little finger will be cut off. Morrison exercises and keeps in shape, and gives the business card to a barfly, echoing the start of the story. The story ends when Dick and Cindy meet the McCanns, and Dick realizes that Jimmy's wife is missing her little finger on her right hand.

== Style and themes ==
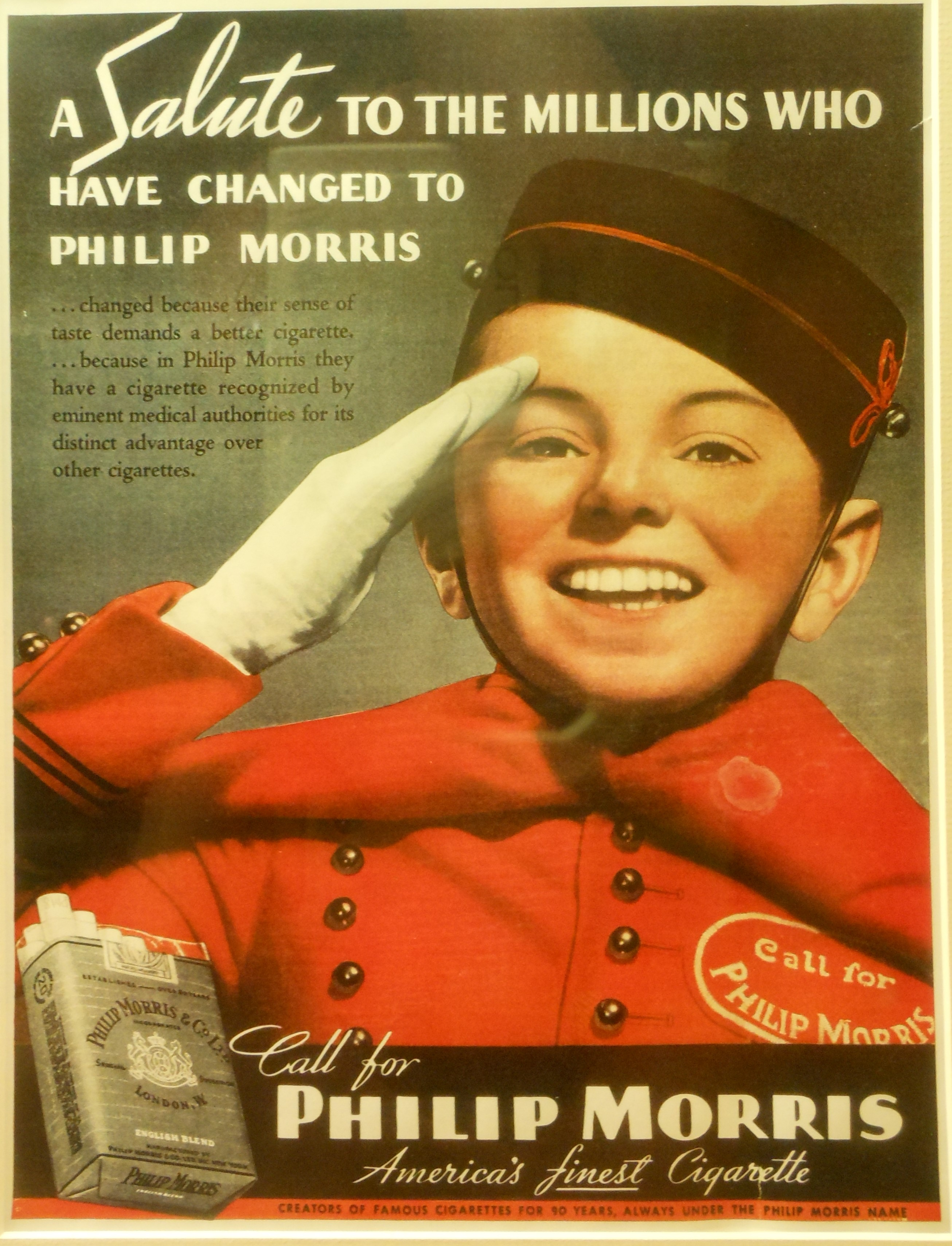
Early 20th century advertisement for Philip Morris Cigarettes. The story's protagonist's name, Dick Morrison, makes reference to this company.

Stephen King connects his classic horror style with humor in "Quitters, Inc.", as he tells the story of how the threat of radical punishment can curb smoking addiction quickly. The names of the main characters of the text, Dick Morrison and Jimmy McCann refer to the tobacco company Philip Morris and the advertising company, McCann. The story portrays the upper-middle-class in the late 1970s, particularly the way in which smoking was widespread in popular culture. When King was writing this story, the movement to quit smoking was starting to become increasingly popular in the United States. This began with the affluent in upper management roles who, like King, could ‘afford’ the effort to quit smoking. Having previously written primarily about blue-collar characters, Kings makes a shift in "Quitters, Inc.", exploring the horrors of the upper class.

Dr. Katherine Hawley says that through the tale, Stephen King questions how social accountability strategies raise ethical dilemmas around self-control. She writes that outright promises and contracts generate new moral obligations, and when we put other people's interests on the line, we must be realistic about our prospects of success. The formalization of this by promising, like Morrison does to Donatti, adds an ethical dimension. This is to say that, in "Quitters, Inc.", even if Morrison succeeds in quitting, the danger he places his family in is morally abhorrent and outrageous, Hawley says.

"Quitters, Inc." has been utilized to discuss approach to communication of characters in modern American literature. According to Dr. Tatjana Rusko, Mr. Donatti uses an emotional approach to impression management when attempting to intimidate Morrison. She says that when Morrison is at Quitters, Inc. for the first time, Mr. Donatti's speech is unshakable and persuasive. He uses an assertive tone and repetition of the personal pronoun ‘we’ to present a desired image and, as Rusko writes, a hypnotic effect. She writes that the reference to the well-known guru Dale Carnegie is a hook that Mr. Donatti uses to manipulate Morrison.

Mark Browning says that "Quitters, Inc." can be more accurately described as a story of the unexpected. He also draws a link between this story and Roald Dahl’s 1954 story "Man from the South", especially as both feature the wife of a minor character having her pinky cut off.

Tony Magistrale says that King's fiction is largely satirical in nature, that "reveals a collective cultural fears and fantasies which go unspoken in everyday life". He writes that Stephen King's work mostly aims to critique a loss of dignity through a lack of self-control and powerlessness. Ben P. Idick says that the terror of King's works, like "Quitters, Inc.", is that he combines fear and realism.

== Autobiographical elements ==
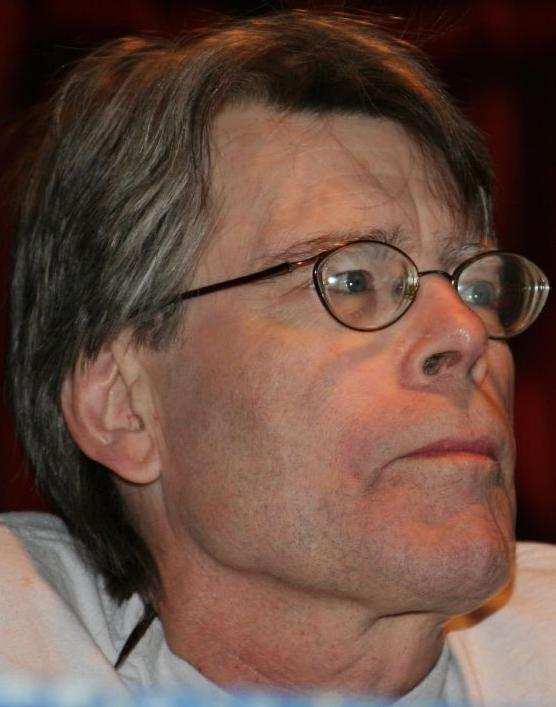
Author Stephen King employs elements of autobiography in his many works, including the short stories in Night Shift.

Stephen King has criticized psychoanalysis several times throughout his career. King tries to convey the evil of behavioral psychology specialists from his point of view, says Dr. Lenore C. Terr. She says that King developed his childhood fear of psychiatry despite the possibility that it could have helped him. In "Quitters, Inc.", this manifests in the terrifying addiction counselor Vincent Donatti and the satire of self-improvement "guru" Dale Carnegie. This is similar to another story in Night Shift, "The Boogeyman", where a boogeyman that has murdered three young children disguises itself as a psychiatrist. Additionally, as King suffered from insomnia and nightmares in his youth, Terr says that he translated these nightmares to others through his horror fiction.

In the early 1970s, King developed a severe alcohol addiction that would persist for more than a decade. His addiction to alcohol, drugs and cigarettes was so severe that King says he barely recalls writing his 1981 novel Cujo. Like Dick Morrison in "Quitters, Inc.", Stephen King was dependent on nicotine for decades. He thought of cigarettes as a stimulant for his imagination and says that quitting smoking caused his writing to "slow down". As a result of this lifelong struggle, addiction was a key theme that appeared in several of King's works, notably Misery (1987) and "Quitters, Inc." (1978).

== Adaptations ==
=== Cat's Eye (1985) ===
"Quitters, Inc." was adapted onto the big screen in the 1985 anthology horror film Cat’s Eye, alongside "The Ledge" and "General". This dramatization features James Woods as Dick Morrison, and Alan King as Dr. Vincent Donatti, produced by the De Laurentiis Entertainment Group. Like the other adaptations, this film downplays the horror from the original, by elevating the humour in the work. The film opens in New York with a cat having escaped and is captured by an agent for Quitters, Inc. The main difference between the adaptation is the replacement of the rabbit from the original text with a cat, which like the rabbit, is later electrocuted to disturb Morrison. The film ends just like the text, with the threat that if Morrison compensates for smoking with overeating, his wife's little finger will be cut off. Moving onto Atlantic City, the cat is adopted by Cressner, a gangster who has just become aware of his wife's affair (the beginning of "The Ledge")

In Cat’s Eye, Morrison's attempt to smoke secretly leads to a chain of horror clichés; thunder and lightning, creeping around the house at night, a shocking glimpse in his own reflection and a golf bag that jumps out at Morrison from a wardrobe. In one scene, a party that is full of cigarette smoke leads to vivid hallucinations and surrealism where Morrison sees a strange figure sit on the couch and exhale smoke slowly. The final scene, in which we get a close-up of Jerry's wife's missing finger, is when we receive confirmation that Morrison's experiences were real, Mark Browning says.

Other adaptations:

- Bollywood film No Smoking (2007) : a neo-noir psychological thriller that is based on "Quitters, Inc." The plot follows K (John Abraham), a chain smoker who agrees to quit smoking to save his marriage by attending a rehabilitation center but is trapped by Baba Bengali (Paresh Rawal) who is sure to make him quit.
- “Bigalow’s Last Smoke” (1985) an episode of Tales from the Darkside: Mr. Bigalow, a chain smoker, wakes up to find himself trapped in a replica of his own apartment. A mysterious figure appears on the television screen which subjects him to endurance tests in order to force him to quit smoking, which pushes him to the edge of sanity. When he recovers, he finds he has no interest in smoking at all, only to be confronted by the figure about his addiction to caffeine, and that now they are going to treat him for that.

== See also ==
- Stephen King short fiction bibliography
- "The Hellgramite Method"
