= From Time to Time =

From Time to Time may refer to:

- From Time to Time (film), a 2009 British film directed by Julian Fellowes
- The Timekeeper or From Time to Time (1992), a Circle-Vision 360° film shown at Disney theme parks
- From Time to Time (novel), a 1995 novel by Jack Finney
- From Time to Time – The Singles Collection (1991), an album by Paul Young
- "From Time to Time", a song by Rascal Flatts from the album Rascal Flatts (2000)
- "From Time to Time", a song by Ride from the album Carnival of Light (1994)
