= Victoria Catlin =

American actress (1952–2024)

- Catlin as Blackie O'Reilly in Twin Peaks
- Born: Victoria Shechter; September 23, 1952; Moline, Illinois, U.S.
- Died: February 28, 2024 (aged 71)
- Occupation: Actress

Victoria Catlin (née Shechter, September 23, 1952 – February 28, 2024) was an American actress best known for her roles as Blackie O'Reilly in the television series Twin Peaks, and in films as Anastasia in Ghoulies (1985), Ellen Forrest in Maniac Cop (1988), and Dr. Catherine Peake in Howling V: The Rebirth (1989).

== Life and career ==
Victoria Shechter was born in Moline, Illinois on September 23, 1952. She was best known for her roles as Blackie O'Reilly, the madam of One-Eyed Jacks, in Twin Peaks, Ellen Forrest (wife of Bruce Campbell's character) in Maniac Cop (1988), Dr. Catherine Peake in Howling V: The Rebirth (1989), and Anastasia in Ghoulies (1985). She was also in Mutant on the Bounty.

Catlin additionally appeared in the films Slow Burn (1986) and Maid to Order (1987), and in the TV shows Amazing Stories and Adam-12.

Catlin died on February 28, 2024, at the age of 71.

== Filmography ==
=== Film ===
Year	Title	Role	Notes
1985	Ghoulies	Anastasia	
1987	Maid to Order	Alicia Nolin	
1988	Maniac Cop	Ellen Forrest	
1989	Mutant on the Bounty	Babette	
1989	Howling V: The Rebirth	Dr. Catherine Peake	

=== Television ===
Year	Title	Role	Notes
1986	Slow Burn	Erica	Television film
1987	Amazing Stories	Ann Hellenbeck	Episode: "Such Interesting Neighbors"
1990	Twin Peaks	Blackie O'Reilly	7 episodes
1990	Adam-12	Second Woman in Argument	Episode: "Teach the Children"
