= Doris Gilbert =

American screenwriter

- Born: Doris Wolfe Gilbert; January 27, 1914; New York, New York, USA
- Died: December 15, 1993 (aged 79); Los Angeles, California, USA
- Occupation: Screenwriter
- Spouses: Allen Feit (m. 1932) Robert Abrahams (m. 1943; div. 1944) Henry (Hank) Levy (m. 1946)
- Parent: L. Wolfe Gilbert

Doris Wolfe Gilbert (January 27, 1914 – December 15, 1993) was an American screenwriter and TV writer known for her work on B movies of the 1940s and 1950s at Republic Pictures.

== Early life and career ==
Gilbert was the youngest of three daughters born to famed Russia-born composer L. Wolfe Gilbert and his wife, Catherine Oestreicher.

The family moved from New York to Los Angeles when Gilbert was a girl, and she got into screenwriting at a young age thanks to her father's involvement writing songs for movies at Fox. When she was still a teenager, she married lawyer Allen Feit, who she had met in NYC a year earlier. She continued to write under her maiden name.

During the 1940s, she began working at Republic, where she wrote films like Storm Over Lisbon and Lake Placid Serenade. During the 1950s and 1960s, she wrote scripts for over a dozen television shows, including Science Fiction Theatre and Adventures of Superman.

In 1941–42, Gilbert collaborated with Sally Benson on a radio version of the latter's Junior Miss short stories. The series starred Shirley Temple. Gilbert also collaborated with Benson on a script for Meet Me in St. Louis.

Gilbert published two stories in The Magazine of Fantasy and Science Fiction: "The Chocolate Coach" (January 1953) and "Arrangement in Green" (February 1954).

== Personal life ==
Gilbert was married at least three times. On September 11, 1932, she married attorney Allen Feit. On May 15, 1943, Gilbert and fellow writer Robert Abrahams were wed; they divorced in March 1944. On April 8, 1946, Gilbert married press agent Hank Levy.

== Selected works ==
For radio:

- Junior Miss (1942)

For film:

- Meet Me in St. Louis (1942 - uncredited)
- Geraldine (1953)
- Little Egypt (1951)
- Lake Placid Serenade (1944)
- Storm Over Lisbon (1944)
- Atlantic City (1944)
- Ladies Courageous (1944)

For TV:

- Bourbon Street Beat (1 episode, 1960)
- Hotel de Paree (1 episode, 1959)
- General Electric Theater (1 episode, 1959)
- Whirlybirds (1 episode, 1958)
- The New Adventures of Charlie Chan (1 episode, 1957)
- Matinee Theatre (2 episodes, 1956–57)
- The Adventures of Hiram Holliday (1 episode, 1956)
- The Millionaire (3 episodes, 1956)
- Science Fiction Theatre (6 episodes, 1955–56)
- TV Reader's Digest (1 episode, 1956)
- The Ford Television Theatre (1 episode, 1955)
- Mr. & Mrs. North (2 episodes, 1954)
- Rheingold Theatre (1 episode, 1954)
- The Loretta Young Show (1 episode, 1954)
- The Unexpected (3 episodes, 1952)
- Adventures of Superman (1 episode, 1952)
