= Science Fiction Theatre =

American science fiction television series

- Also known as: Beyond the Limits
- Genre: Science fiction Anthology
- Written by: Hendrik Vollaerts; Ivan Tors; Stuart Jerome; Jerry Sackheim; Lou Huston
- Directed by: Jack Arnold; William Castle; Eddie Davis; Tom Gries; Paul Guilfoyle; Leigh Jason; Lew Landers; Herbert L. Strock; Henry S. Kesler
- Presented by: Truman Bradley
- Composer: David Rose
- Country of origin: United States
- Original language: English
- No. of seasons: 2
- No. of episodes: 78

Production
- Executive producers: Frederick W. Ziv; Maurice Ziv
- Producer: Ivan Tors
- Cinematography: Monroe P. Askins; Curt Fetters; Robert Hoffman
- Camera setup: Single-camera
- Running time: 25-26 minutes
- Production companies: Ivan Tors Productions; Ziv Television Programs

Original release
- Network: Syndicated
- Release: April 9, 1955 – February 9, 1957

Science Fiction Theatre is an American science fiction anthology television series that was produced by Ivan Tors and Maurice Ziv and originally aired in syndication. It premiered on April 9, 1955, and ended on February 9, 1957, with a total of 78 episodes over the course of two seasons.

== General ==
From 1955 to 1957, Science Fiction Theatre, a semi-documentary television series, explored the what if's of modern science. Placing an emphasis on science before fiction, television viewers were treated to a variety of complex challenges from mental telepathy, robots, man-eating ants, killer trees, man's first flight into space and time travel. Hosted by Truman Bradley, a radio/TV announcer and 1940s film actor, each episode featured stories which had an extrapolated scientific or pseudo scientific emphasis based on actual scientific data available at the time. Typically, the stories related to the life or work of scientists, engineers, inventors, and explorers, the program concentrated on such concepts as space flight, robots, telepathy, flying saucers, time travel, and the intervention of extraterrestrials in human affairs. With few exceptions, the stories were original concepts based on articles from recent issues of Scientific American, issues of which can be seen on Bradley's desk in a number of episodes.

The first season was filmed on 35mm Eastmancolor negative, which was then not considered the best color available for television, often fading over time due to vinegar deterioration. Syndication packages for a second season were renewed at an 80 percent retention ratio, borderline for color production. In March 1956, producer Ivan Tors agreed with Frederick Ziv to produce the program in black and white to offset production expenses in return for a second season.

Like the syndicated Out There and Tales of Tomorrow anthology series before it, Science Fiction Theatre was a predecessor to later science-fiction anthology shows such as The Twilight Zone and The Outer Limits.

The show had no fixed cast other than the host, although a number of actors appeared in multiple episodes in different roles. Michael Fox (7ep.), Dick Foran (4ep.), Marshall Thompson (7ep.), Dabbs Greer (3ep.), John Doucette (3 ep.), Arthur Franz (5ep.), Whit Bissell (3ep.), Judith Ames (6ep.), and Bruce Bennett (5ep.) appeared in more episodes than most. The show also featured stars such as Basil Rathbone, Kenneth Tobey (2ep.), Victor Jory, Gene Barry (2ep.), DeForest Kelley (3ep.), Phyllis Coates and Vincent Price (2ep.). Edmund Gwenn (2ep.) and Ruth Hussey (2ep.) were the highest-paid actors for the series, earning $2,500 each for a three-day filming, followed by Gene Lockhart (2ep.), Don DeFore, and Howard Duff who were paid $2,000 each. Most actors were paid between $150 and $500 depending on the size of their role.

== Intro and outro ==
Each episode was introduced by a stirring brass, string, and woodwind fanfare (now established as having been composed by David Rose, using the pen name of Ray Llewellyn due to union and contractual restrictions at the time), while the camera panned over a science laboratory. Then, Truman Bradley showed a simple scientific experiment which was related to the topic of that week's show. Bradley's demonstrations were often staged, but yielded results consistent with the outcome of true experiments. He was always careful to point out that the story presented was fictional: that "it did not happen".

The pilot episode was filmed in July 1954, but Bradley's on-screen duties were not filmed until September 11, which also included off-screen narration for the pilot and the second episode produced, "Y-O-R-D-", which did not go into production until December 1954. Bradley's duties included visits to the studio for hosting assignments, often filmed in batches of two, three and four episodes in a single day. On February 28, 1955, for example, Herbert Strock directed Bradley for all the pick-ups and off-screen narrations for episodes three, four and five. Bradley returned to the studio two weeks later for pick-ups and off-screen narration for episodes six and seven. After the first two episodes were filmed, an oversight was discovered: Bradley wore a different tie on September 11, 1954 and December 1954. Afterwards, Bradley followed instructions to wear the same suit and same tie for every episode moving forward.

Because of the limited budgets and intense production schedules of ZIV episodic television shows, most of the scientific, and not-so-scientific apparatus appears again and again as props with many different functions. A few of the electrical gadgets such as the computerized chess game, were fake—magnets inside the chess pieces with a technician under the table to move the pieces. One anti-gravity device featured in the episodes "Beyond" and "Y-O-R-D" was a primary device for a key scene in Earth vs. the Flying Saucers (1956). Posters, paintings and electronic gadgets appeared that were used previously as props in producer Ivan Tors' The Magnetic Monster (1953), Riders to the Stars (1954) and Gog (1954). The Bendix Aviation Corporation supplied computer equipment seen in the episode "Survival in Box Canyon". Garco the Robot, used to publicize the Rocky Jones, Space Ranger television series, and featured prominently in a 1957 Disneyland episode, was featured in the episode "Time is Just a Place".

== Broadcast ==
The program never aired over a network. All 78 half-hour episodes were syndicated across the country in package deals of 39 episodes each. This meant the program could air on Saturday evening over a television station in Kalamazoo, Michigan, while the program aired on Wednesday evenings over a station in Newark, New Jersey. Every station featured regional sponsorship and depending on the price tag, Truman Bradley was hired to film commercials for those local spots as inserts. The program was re-titled Beyond The Limits for later syndication in the 1960s.

From 1996 to 1998, Science Fiction Theatre aired weekly on Friday evenings over the Sci-Fi Channel on cable TV. The picture quality was above average and the same provided to PBS stations in the 1980s. While PBS aired the program uncut and unedited, Sci-Fi Channel aired the episode in abbreviated form (21 and one half minutes instead of 26) to make more room for commercials.

== Influence ==
In the 1985 film Back to the Future, Science Fiction Theatre is mentioned as George McFly's favorite television program, from which Marty McFly gains the idea to dress up as an alien in order to scare George into asking his mother Lorraine to the school dance.

== Episodes ==
=== Series overview ===
Season	Episodes	Originally released	
Season	Episodes	First released	Last released
1	39	April 9, 1955	January 28, 1956
2	39	April 7, 1956	April 6, 1957

=== Season 1 (1955–56) ===
No. overall	No. in season	Title	Directed by	Written by	Original release date
1	1	"Beyond"	Herbert L. Strock	Story by : Ivan Tors; Teleplay by : Robert Smith and George Van Marter	April 9, 1955
Traveling at three times the speed of sound, a test pilot ejects claiming that another craft was about to collide with his. Cast: William Lundigan, Ellen Drew, Truman Bradley, Bruce Bennett
2	2	"Time Is Just a Place"	Jack Arnold	Story by : Jack Finney; Teleplay by : Lee Berg	April 16, 1955
A young couple discovers that their neighbors, who possess a sonic broom and many other technologically advanced household items, are fugitives from the future who have fled to the past to escape an oppressive government. Adapted from Jack Finney's short story, "Such Interesting Neighbors". Cast: Don DeFore, Marie Windsor, Warren Stevens, Peggy O'Connor
3	3	"Out of Nowhere"	Herbert L. Strock	Story by : Teleplay by : Donn Mullally	April 23, 1955
When bats begin colliding with skyscrapers, the Continental Air Defense Command is alerted. They fear that the "radar" that protects bats from collision has somehow been deactivated. Cast: Richard Arlen, Jess Barker
4	4	"Y-O-R-D-"	Leon Benson	Story by : Ivan Tors and George Van Marter; Teleplay by : Leon Benson and George Van Marter	April 30, 1955
The Magnetic Pole Weather Station receives a strange distress message and initiates one of the greatest rescue missions of all time. Cast: Walter Kingsford, Judith Ames, DeForest Kelley, Kenneth Tobey, Louis Jean Heydt
5	5	"Stranger in the Desert"	Henry S. Kesler	Story by : Ivan Tors; Teleplay by : Curtis Kenyon and Robert M. Fresco	May 7, 1955
Two uranium prospectors meet a stranger from another land who is searching for oxygen-producing plants. Cast: Marshall Thompson, Gene Evans, Lowell Gilmore
6	6	"No Food for Thought"	Jack Arnold	Story by : Teleplay by : Robert M. Fresco	May 14, 1955
A biologist and his staff test synthetic foods, that have proved fatal to animals, on themselves. Cast: John Howard, Otto Kruger
7	7	"The Brain of John Emerson"	Leslie Goodwins	Story by : Teleplay by : Hendrik Vollaerts	May 21, 1955
A police sergeant escapes death from a bullet in his brain but finds himself changed. Cast: John Howard, Ellen Drew
8	8	"Spider, Inc."	Jack Arnold	Story by : Teleplay by : Jerry Sackheim	May 28, 1955
A young geologist discovers an ancient spider enclosed in a piece of transparent rock. Cast: Gene Barry, Audrey Totter
9	9	"Death at 2 A.M."	Henry S. Kesler	Story by : Ivan Tors; Teleplay by : Ellis Marcus	June 4, 1955
A scientist uses an experimental strength serum to murder a man who is blackmailing his assistant. Cast: Skip Homeier, John Qualen, Ted de Corsia
10	10	"Conversation With an Ape"	Herbert L. Strock	Story by : Teleplay by : Hendrik Vollaerts	June 11, 1955
A telepathic chimpanzee saves a scientist and his wife from a killer. Cast: Hugh Beaumont, Barbara Hale
11	11	"Marked 'Danger'"	Leigh Jason	Story by : John Burnett; Teleplay by : Jerry Sackheim and Stuart Jerome	June 18, 1955
While doing field work in a desert, a mining engineer finds the payload from a high altitude rocket experiment. He takes it home and leaves it in his wife's care while he goes into town to contact the authorities. As soon as he's gone, his wife examines the payload and inadvertently releases a toxic gas. Cast: Otto Kruger, Arthur Franz, Nancy Gates
12	12	"Hour of Nightmare"	Henry S. Kesler	Story by : Teleplay by : Lou Huston	June 25, 1955
Two top freelance photographers go to Mexico to photograph mysterious flying objects and find a dead alien. Cast: William Bishop, Lynn Bari, Charles Evans
13	13	"100 Years Young"	Herbert L. Strock	Story by : Arthur Fitz Richards; Teleplay by : Jerry Sackheim	July 2, 1955
A retired man confides to a fellow research chemist that he is more than two centuries old. Cast: Ruth Hussey, John Archer, John Abbott
14	14	"The Strange Doctor Lorenz"	Leigh Jason	Story by : Teleplay by : Norman Jolley	July 9, 1955
The story of a beekeeper whose bees manufacture a wonder drug instead of honey. Cast: Edmund Gwenn, Donald Curtis, Kristine Miller
15	15	"The Frozen Sound"	Leigh Jason	Story by : Norman Jolley and Ivan Tors; Teleplay by : Norman Jolley	July 30, 1955
A paperweight is found to reproduce sounds from 2000 years ago. Cast: Marshall Thompson, Marilyn Erskine, Ray Collins, Michael Fox
16	16	"The Stones Began to Move"	Lew Landers	Story by : Ivan Tors and Doris Gilbert; Teleplay by : Doris Gilbert	August 6, 1955
A murder and the secrets of the Pyramids combine. Cast: Basil Rathbone
17	17	"The Lost Heartbeat"	Henry S. Kesler	Story by : Anna Hunger and R. DeWitt Miller; Teleplay by : Stuart Jerome	August 13, 1955
A dying scientist needs time to finish his experiments. Cast: Zachary Scott
18	18	"The World Below"	Herbert L. Strock	Story by : Teleplay by : Lew Hewitt	August 27, 1955
The survivors of a submarine disaster claim that they saw a city on the sea floor, but are ridiculed by investigators. Cast: Gene Barry, Marguerite Chapman
19	19	"Barrier of Silence"	Leon Benson	Story by : Teleplay by : Lou Huston	September 3, 1955
Professor Richard Sheldon has been returned to the United States in a confused, altered state of mind after enemy agents hypnotized him in an environment of absolute silence while visiting Milan. His friend, psychiatrist Dr. Elliott Harcourt, reasons that placing Professor Sheldon in a similar environment will reverse his condition. He is placed in a wheelchair in the "Cone of Silence", consisting of a raised circular platform suspended by 3 wires tied to a common vertex. Although the cone's surface is open, anyone sitting inside would experience silence due to the phased ultrasonic noise generators located just below the vertex. Anyone speaking inside the cone could not be heard outside. With Dr. Harcourt's guidance, the treatment works, and Sheldon regains his memory. Cast: Adolphe Menjou, Warren Stevens, Phyllis Coates, Charles Maxwell, John Doucette
20	20	"Negative Man"	Henry S. Kesler	Story by : Ivan Tors; Teleplay by : Thelma Schnee	September 10, 1955
After a near-fatal electric shock from a computer, a technician exhibits enhanced sensory and intellectual abilities. Cast: Dane Clark, Beverly Garland
21	21	"Dead Reckoning"	Herbert L. Strock	Story by : Teleplay by : Gene Levitt	September 17, 1955
A pilot lost in a geomagnetic storm is forced to navigate by a thermometer, a coffee pot and the Earth itself. Cast: James Craig, Steve Brodie, Arleen Whelan
22	22	"A Visit from Dr. Pliny"	Henry S. Kesler	Story by : Teleplay by : Sloan Nibley	September 24, 1955
The eccentric Dr. Pliny visits a university where he builds a device purported to provide free energy from cosmic rays. Cast: Edmund Gwenn, William Schallert
23	23	"The Strange People at Pecos"	Eddie Davis	Story by : Teleplay by : Doris Gilbert	October 1, 1955
A radar expert suspects his next-door neighbors are spies from another planet. Cast: Arthur Franz, Doris Dowling, Dabbs Greer, Judith Ames
24	24	"Dead Storage"	Jack Herzberg	Story by : Ivan Tors; Teleplay by : Stuart Jerome	October 8, 1955
A baby mammoth revives after being frozen in the Arctic for 500,000 years. Cast: Virginia Bruce
25	25	"The Human Equation"	Henry S. Kesler	Story by : Teleplay by : Norman Jolley	October 15, 1955
A team of scientists trying to develop a new antibiotic are driven to hostility by exposure to the drug. Cast: Macdonald Carey, Jean Byron
26	26	"Target Hurricane"	Leigh Jason	Story by : Ivan Tors; Teleplay by : Robert Schaefer and Eric Freiwald	October 22, 1955
A freak super-hurricane, more powerful than any hurricane than has ever occurred before, threatens the Miami coastline. Then, just when it seems that Miami is doomed, a freak high-pressure system forces the storm back out to sea, where it dissipates over colder waters. Subsequent tests reveal that the storm was triggered by the explosion of an exceptionally large meteor when it splashed into the ocean, whose unusually warm waters were unable to drain off the meteor's excess heat energy (built up by atmospheric friction) fast enough to prevent the blast. The prevailing weather conditions at the time combined with the blast to produce the super-storm. Cast: Marshall Thompson, Ray Collins, Margaret Field
27	27	"The Water Maker"	Herbert L. Strock	Story by : Jerry Sackheim; Teleplay by : Stuart Jerome	October 29, 1955
After a researcher dies in an explosion trying to create water from tritium, his friend attempts to complete the research. Cast: William Talman, Virginia Grey, Craig Stevens
28	28	"The Unexplored"	Eddie Davis	Story by : Teleplay by : Arthur Weiss	November 5, 1955
The doubting wife of a psychic researcher locates a missing colleague through clairvoyance. Cast: Kent Smith, Osa Massen
29	29	"The Hastings Secret"	Jack Herzberg	Story by : Teleplay by : Lee Hewitt	November 12, 1955
A scientist discovers a species of termites that consume minerals instead of wood. Cast: Bill Williams, Barbara Hale, Morris Ankrum
30	30	"Postcard from Barcelona"	Alvin Ganzer	Story by : Ivan Tors and Tom Gries; Teleplay by : Sloan Nibley	November 19, 1955
A scientist dies suddenly from heart failure. While examining his laboratory and unfinished work, workers of his institute discover he had been receiving his discoveries from extraterrestrials orbiting 1,500 miles above the Earth. Cast: Keefe Brasselle, Walter Kingsford, Christine Larson, Cyril Delevanti
31	31	"Friend of a Raven"	Tom Gries	Story by : Teleplay by : Richard Joseph Tuber	November 26, 1955
The tale of a strange little boy who can communicate with animals. Cast: Richard Eyer, Virginia Bruce
32	32	"Beyond Return"	Eddie Davis	Story by : Stanley G. Weinbaum; Teleplay by : Doris Gilbert	December 3, 1955
A medical researcher isolates a compound that regenerates damaged tissue. When he tries it on a terminally ill patient, she recovers completely in three days and now has the ability to change her appearance and fingerprints seemingly at will. (The story is a remake of episode "The Miraculous Serum" of Tales of Tomorrow, 1952) Cast: Zachary Scott, Joan Vohs, Peter Hanson
33	33	"Before the Beginning"	Alvin Ganzer	Story by : Ivan Tors and Arthur Weiss; Teleplay by : Arthur Weiss	December 10, 1955
An obsessive scientist is unaware his wife is gravely ill as he works to develop a machine for generating high energy photons. He believes the photons, similar to those ejected from the Sun, were the origin of life on Earth. When his "photon gun" generates living matter, he uses it to treat his wife's degenerated endocrine system with positive results. But was it the technology or his renewed love for his wife that caused her to rally? Cast: Dane Clark, Ted de Corsia, Judith Ames, Phillip Pine, Emerson Treacy
34	34	"The Long Day"	Paul Guilfoyle	Story by : Teleplay by : George Fass and Gertrude Fass	December 17, 1955
"Project Torch", an experimental missile containing an artificial sun, is launched during early evening over a desert. When the craft mysteriously fails to return to Earth, the intense light creates artificial daylight. Fortunately, the extended daylight prevents an unscrupulous housing developer from attacking an ex-convict's family to force them out of his newly constructed neighborhood. The developer sees the light and has a change of opinion. But what caused the artificial sun to remain in the sky long after it should have fallen? Cast: George Brent, Steve Brodie, DeForest Kelley, Jean Byron, Sam Gilmore, Robert Barton
35	35	"Project 44"	Tom Gries	Story by : Teleplay by : Lou Huston	December 24, 1955
A new rocket fuel makes interplanetary travel possible. But the effects of the hostile environment of outer space on mankind are still unknown. "Project 44" gives a husband and wife research team one year to determine if a select group of specialists can travel safely to Mars. But something seems to be undermining the project. Is it bad luck or sabotage? Cast: Bill Williams, Doris Dowling, Biff Elliot, Mack Williams, Kenneth Drake
36	36	"Are We Invaded?"	Leon Benson	Story by : Teleplay by : Norman Jolley	December 31, 1955
"That which we do not understand sometimes causes apprehension." A reporter and the daughter of a respected astronomer, watching the stars one evening from their parked car, see what they consider a flying saucer. A stranger appears at the door of the car saying he too saw the light in the sky, and asks if he can be given a lift down the hill into town. Later, the astronomer refuses to believe the couple saw anything more than an optical illusion. To prove the existence of UFOs, the reporter films a documentary of witnesses, while the astronomer promptly demonstrates scientific explanations for each witness's sightings. But the mysterious stranger has left a photograph at the astronomer's lab- a photograph of the Solar System taken from space. The stranger has disappeared, but left a forwarding address: Centauri 6. The sixth planet of the star Alpha Centauri, 4.3 light years from Earth. Cast: Pat O'Brien, Anthony Eustrel, Leslie Gaye
37	37	"Sound of Murder"	Jack Arnold	Story by : Ivan Tors; Teleplay by : Stuart Jerome	January 7, 1956
The senior scientist of a top secret government project is found murdered in a hotel room. The notes and formulae for the project have been stolen by foreign powers. The project's brilliant engineer is arrested and imprisoned for the murder, and for espionage, because a number of witnesses heard him asking by telephone the senior scientist for a meeting in the hotel room shortly before the murder occurred. To prove his innocence and his theory of how the crimes were committed, the accused engineer constructs a voice synthesizer. He uses it to have himself released from prison by duplicating the voice of a government official by telephone. The engineer also calls the other members of the team to the government official's office and uses the machine to trick the guilty team member into confessing. Cast: Howard Duff, Russ Conway, Wheaton Chambers, Christine Larson, Whit Bissell, Edward Earle, Ruth Perrott, Charles Maxwell
38	38	"Operation Flypaper"	Eddie Davis	Story by : Teleplay by : Doris Gilbert	January 14, 1956
A group of scientists from many disciplines are met in secret conclave to develop a method to mine the Earth's oceans. But as they begin to share their theories and devices, the materials suddenly vanish. They notice that not only equipment and files are gone, but time has also disappeared. A brief conversation begun at 11 pm ends more than an hour later, with no awareness of the intervening time having passed. A spy has found a way to move among the scientists at will and take what he wants without anyone perceiving him. In an effort to capture this thief, "Operation Flypaper" is organized. A false laboratory is outfitted with hidden cameras and microphones, and technicians begin simulated work on another piece of vital equipment. As the room is observed, the occupants suddenly freeze in mid-stride. A man enters with a device that can put subjects into total sleep with no after effects, and begins to steal the equipment. The observers reveal he is being watched, and in a rage he shatters his machine and is captured. The man was a brilliant but paranoid scientist who wanted to be recognized for contributions to science and was stealing mining ideas and equipment he would later "invent". Ironically, his sleep machine, now totally destroyed, would have insured his place in scientific history as the greatest method of surgical anesthesia ever invented. Cast: Vincent Price, George Eldredge, John Eldredge, Dabbs Greer, Kristine Miller
39	39	"The Other Side of the Moon"	Eddie Davis	Story by : Teleplay by : Robert M. Fresco and Richard Joseph Tuber	January 28, 1956
A picture of the far side of the Moon finds creatures from other worlds at work on its surface. Cast: Skip Homeier, Beverly Garland, Philip Ober

=== Season 2 (1956–57) ===
No. overall	No. in season	Title	Directed by	Written by	Original release date
40	1	"Signals From the Heart"	Herbert L. Strock	Story by : Ivan Tors; Teleplay by : Stuart Jerome	April 7, 1956
Scientists work to save a man's life by remote control. Cast: Walter Kingsford, Peter Hanson, Joyce Holden
41	2	"The Long Sleep"	Paul Guilfoyle	Story by : Ivan Tors; Teleplay by : Arthur Weiss	April 14, 1956
A research scientist is forced to perform a strange experiment on an ailing young orangutan. When its success is publicized, a man kidnaps the doctor's wife and son and forces him to repeat the experiment on his son who is dying. Cast: Dick Foran, John Doucette, Nancy Hale
42	3	"Who Is This Man?"	William Castle	Story by : Teleplay by : Charles Smith	April 21, 1956
Hypnosis to help a shy college student reveals a frightening mystery. Cast: Bruce Bennett, Harlow Wilcox, Charles Smith
43	4	"The Green Bomb"	Tom Gries	Story by : Ivan Tors; Teleplay by : Tom Gries	April 28, 1956
A breathtaking search for stolen atomic materials. Cast: Whit Bissell, Kenneth Tobey, Robert Griffin
44	5	"When a Camera Fails"	Herbert L. Strock	Story by : Ivan Tors; Teleplay by : Norman Jolley	May 5, 1956
A geophysicist discovers that rocks can make pictures. Cast: Gene Lockhart, Mack Williams, Than Wyenn
45	6	"Bullet Proof"	Paul Guilfoyle	Story by : Teleplay by : Lee Hewitt	May 12, 1956
A pair of metallurgists is approached by an escaped convict with samples of a light and flexible metal that will stop bullets. He claims to have gotten the metal from a spot where a UFO landed to make repairs. Cast: Marshall Thompson, Jacqueline Holt, John Eldredge
46	7	"The Flicker"	Herbert L. Strock	Story by : Robert E. Smith; Teleplay by : Lou Huston	May 19, 1956
A graduate student in sociology commits a murder after watching a badly flickering movie. Cast: Victor Jory, Michael Fox, Judith Ames
47	8	"The Unguided Missile"	Herbert L. Strock	Story by : Teleplay by : Arthur Weiss	May 26, 1956
Military secrets about a missile guidance system are being received by a journalist while she sleeps. Cast: Ruth Hussey, Peter Hansen, Francis McDonald
48	9	"Mind Machine"	Paul Guilfoyle	Story by : Teleplay by : Ellis Marcus	June 9, 1956
A project to decipher signals from the brain gets a boost when an aging scientist suffers a stroke and offers use of his dying brain to decode the brainwaves. Cast: Bill Williams, Cyril Delevanti, Brad Trumbull, Sydney Mason, Lonie Blackman, Fred Coby, Jim Sheldon, Helen Jay
49	10	"The Missing Waveband"	Jack Herzberg	Story by : Ivan Tors; Teleplay by : Lou Huston	June 16, 1956
A scientist builds a transmitter that operates in a never-before attained frequency band. Using the new device he and his colleagues receive new scientific information from a voice that refuses to identify itself or its country of origin. Cast: Dick Foran, Stafford Repp, Gene Roth, Michael Fox
50	11	"The Human Experiment"	Paul Guilfoyle	Story by : Ivan Tors; Teleplay by : Doris Gilbert	June 23, 1956
Taking inspiration from the insect world, a psycho-pharmacologist elicits an enzyme that can turn mentally defective humans into useful hive workers. Cast: Marshall Thompson, Virginia Christine, Claudia Barrett
51	12	"Man Who Didn't Know"	Herbert L. Strock	Story by : Teleplay by : Hendrik Vollaerts	June 30, 1956
An experimental atomic powered aircraft explodes over the Pacific Ocean. The crew is assumed lost, but the captain appears six months later after having been treated by an anonymous expert surgeon. As soon as he returns to work on the project, classified information begins to leak. Cast: Arthur Franz, Susan Cummings, Bruce Wendell, Voltaire Perkins
52	13	"End of Tomorrow"	Herbert L. Strock	Story by : Teleplay by : Peter R. Brooke	July 7, 1956
A mysterious and vaguely menacing medical researcher develops a vaccine that both cures and prevents all microbial infections known to man. The entire world is to be inoculated when it is discovered that the drug has a side-effect: All offspring of vaccinated animals are female. Cast: Christopher Dark, Diana Douglas, Walter Kingsford, Dabbs Greer
53	14	"The Phantom Car"	Herbert L. Strock	Story by : Teleplay by : Lee Hewitt	July 21, 1956
A car with no driver is running around in the desert and occasionally hits people but does not stop. Cast: John Archer, Judith Ames, Tyler McVey, Herbert C. Lytton, William Fawcett
54	15	"Beam of Fire"	Herbert L. Strock	Story by : Ivan Tors; Teleplay by : Stuart Jerome	July 28, 1956
Two scientists working on a top-secret rocket fuel are murdered by high-frequency sound beams. Government security agents manage to track down and destroy the sonic projector, but the only recoverable part of the debris is melted beyond recognition and is composed of a material unknown on Earth. Cast: Wayne Morris, Frank Gerstle, Harlan Warde
55	16	"The Legend of Crater Mountain"	Paul Guilfoyle	Story by : Teleplay by : Bill Buchanan and Lue Hall	August 18, 1956
A young rural schoolteacher finds that her three best pupils are more than human. Cast: Marilyn Erskine, Brad Jackson, Jo Ann Lilliquist
56	17	"Living Lights"	Herbert L. Strock	Story by : Ivan Tors and Ellis Marcus; Teleplay by : Ellis Marcus	August 25, 1956
A graduate student attempts to reproduce the conditions on the surface of Venus in a large bell jar. His experiment results in the creation of a ball of light that acts like a living being. A curious student inadvertently allows it to escape. It returns and others appear. They seem to be trying to attack people with ultra violet light. He destroys them by increasing the vacuum in the bell jar until it explodes. He resolves to try again with more secure conditions with the assistance of the university. Cast: Skip Homeier, Joan Sinclair, Michael Garth
57	18	"Jupitron"	Paul Guilfoyle	Story by : Teleplay by : Arthur Weiss	September 15, 1956
Dr. Barlow and his wife believe they have spent the night on one of Jupiter's moons. They were enveloped by a strange mist while at the beach the night before and awoke the next morning after having had the same "dream." On the moon they encountered a Dr. Wycauff, who had disappeared without a trace ten years before. He explains that he went to the moon to try to help inhabitants stabilize their atmosphere. In exchange, he was to get a chemical called "Jupitron" that would show scientists back on Earth how to grow an unlimited supply of food for the growing population of the Earth. Barlow was summoned to bring it back, but they are returned before they can obtain the substance from Wycauff. Cast: Bill Williams, Toni Gerry, Lowell Gilmore
58	19	"The Throwback"	Paul Guilfoyle	Story by : Teleplay by : Thelma Schnee	September 22, 1956
A genetic research scientist attempts to prove that memories can be inherited. He uses a remarkable series of coincidences as evidence. Cast: Peter Hanson, Ed Kemmer, Virginia Christine
59	20	"Miracle of Doctor Dove"	Herbert L. Strock	Story by : Ivan Tors and George Asness; Teleplay by : George Asness	September 29, 1956
An eminent biologist holds the solution to the strange mystery of three scientists who disappear from the Earth. Cast: Gene Lockhart, Robin Short
60	21	"One Thousand Eyes"	Paul Guilfoyle	Story by : Teleplay by : Stuart Jerome	October 6, 1956
The inventor of several innovative image projection technologies is murdered. His wife says an unknown caller threatened his life unless he surrendered his current project. His laboratory assistant is found dead in a car wreck with plans, but all the plans are for inventions patented long ago. Cast: Vincent Price, Jean Byron
61	22	"Brain Unlimited"	Tom Gries	Story by : Ivan Tors and Sloan Nibley; Teleplay by : Sloan Nibley	October 13, 1956
A scientist takes two weeks off from his current project to develop brain-acceleration technology. With his accelerated brain, he finds the solution to his original project. Cast: Arthur Franz, Diana Douglas, Doug Wilson
62	23	"Death at My Fingertips"	Tom Gries	Story by : Teleplay by : Joel Rapp	October 20, 1956
Fingerprints "prove" a man murdered, even though he was in another city at the time of the killing. Cast: Dick Foran, June Lockhart, John Stephenson
63	24	"Sound That Kills"	Herbert L. Strock	Story by : Teleplay by : Meyer Dolinsky	October 27, 1956
A murderous spy is stealing secrets at an international convention of scientists. Cast: Ludwig Stössel, Ray Collins, Charles Victor
64	25	"Survival in Box Canyon"	Herbert L. Strock	Story by : Ivan Tors; Teleplay by : Lou Houston	November 3, 1956
The Civil Air Patrol searches for a small airplane that crashed near an atomic bomb test range. Cast: Bruce Bennett, Susan Cummings, DeForest Kelley
65	26	"The Voice"	Paul Guilfoyle	Story by : Teleplay by : Doris Gilbert	November 10, 1956
After being paralyzed by the crash of his small airplane, a lawyer finds he has telepathic powers. Cast: Donald Curtis, Kristine Miller, Anthony Eustrel
66	27	"Three Minute Mile"	Eddie Davis	Story by : Teleplay by : George Asness	November 17, 1956
A university professor conducts secret experiments of heart-rate acceleration. Cast: Marshall Thompson, Martin Milner, Gloria Marshall
67	28	"The Last Barrier"	Paul Guilfoyle	Story by : Teleplay by : Hendrik Vollaerts	November 24, 1956
A hoax to conceal a rocket launch reveals startling facts. Cast: Bill Ching, Bruce Wendell
68	29	"Signals from the Moon"	Paul Guilfoyle	Story by : Teleplay by : Tom Gries	December 1, 1956
A surgeon directs an operation to save the life of an important visiting diplomat by television. Cast: Bruce Bennett
69	30	"Doctor Robot"	Eddie Davis	Story by : Teleplay by : Ellis Marcus	December 8, 1956
A computer scientist uses his company's mainframe computer to research the optimal treatment for his ailing wife. Cast: Peter Hanson, Whit Bissell, Doug Wilson
70	31	"The Human Circuit"	Eddie Davis	Story by : Teleplay by : Joel Rapp	December 15, 1956
A nightclub dancer exhibits clairvoyance. Cast: Marshall Thompson, Bill Ching, Joyce Jameson
71	32	"The Miracle Hour"	Paul Guilfoyle	Story by : Teleplay by : Stanley H. Silverman	December 22, 1956
A stage lighting director and his physician friend teach a blind little boy to perceive colored light. Cast: Dick Foran, Jean Byron, Charles Herbert
72	33	"Sun Gold"	Eddie Davis	Story by : Teleplay by : Peter R. Brooke	December 29, 1956
Government scientists, working in Peru, discover evidence of an extraterrestrial at work in the Inca Empire. Cast: Marilyn Erskine, Ross Elliott, Julian Rivero, Paul Fierro
73	34	"Facsimile"	Eddie Davis	Story by : John Bushnell; Teleplay by : Stuart Jerome and John Bushnell	January 5, 1957
Members of a team developing an ultra-sensitive transistor are afflicted by maladies of patients in a nearby hospital. Cast: Arthur Franz, Aline Towne, Donald Curtis
74	35	"Killer Tree"	Eddie Davis	Story by : Robert E. Smith; Teleplay by : Lou Huston	January 12, 1957
A scientist investigates a tree with an ancient reputation of breathing death. Cast: Bill Williams, Bonita Granville, Keith Richards
75	36	"Gravity Zero"	Paul Guilfoyle	Story by : Teleplay by : Donald Corey	January 19, 1957
A university professor nullifies gravity with a magnetic field. Cast: Percy Helton, Lisa Gaye, Walter Kingsford
76	37	"The Magic Suitcase"	Paul Guilfoyle	Story by : William R. Epperson; Teleplay by : Lou Huston	January 26, 1957
A stranger arrives in a remote dwelling with a small suitcase. It has an electrical outlet on the outside and, in the stranger's absence, the homeowner's son plugs his electric train into it. He is scolded by his father but, after the stranger disappears without the suitcase, the man refers it to scientists because the energy the suitcase emits seems unlimited. Unable to pierce the material of the suitcase, the scientists use the suitcase's own energy to break it open. They do not fully understand what they find inside (a block of solidified hydrogen) and the suitcase no longer produces energy. A "killing the goose that laid the golden egg" tale. Cast: Charles Winninger, Judith Ames
77	38	"Bolt of Lightning"	Eddie Davis	Story by : Teleplay by : Meyer Dolinsky	February 2, 1957
A university laboratory and the building housing it are completely vaporized when an experiment gets out of control. Cast: Bruce Bennett, Kristine Miller, Sidney Smith
78	39	"The Strange Lodger"	Eddie Davis	Story by : Teleplay by : Arthur Weiss	February 9, 1957
A peculiar old man is found to be transmitting an encyclopedia on a non-existent television channel. Cast: Peter Hanson, Jan Shepard, Cyril Delevanti

== Home media ==
Timeless Media Group released the complete series on Region 1 DVD on May 12, 2015. While the episodes on the DVD box set are uncut, they include new video transfers using a "one-light" system causing the episodes to appear slightly darker than telecasts of the past two decades. On the packaging of the release, the title for episode "Stranger in the Desert" is misspelled as is "Strangers in the Desert", and the episode "100 Years Young" is presented with the alternate title, "Elixir of Life", in addition to the broadcast title.
