= The Love Letter (1998 film) =

1998 television film by Dan Curtis

- Based on: The Love Letter by Jack Finney
- Screenplay by: James S. Henerson
- Story by: James S. Henerson
- Directed by: Dan Curtis
- Starring: Campbell Scott; Jennifer Jason Leigh
- Composer: Bob Cobert
- Country of origin: United States
- Original language: English

Production
- Executive producer: Richard Welsh
- Producer: Dan Curtis
- Cinematography: Eric Van Haren Noman
- Editor: Bill Blunden
- Running time: 99 minutes
- Production company: Hallmark Hall of Fame Productions

Original release
- Network: CBS
- Release: February 1, 1998

The Love Letter is an American romantic fantasy drama television film directed and produced by Dan Curtis, based on a short story of the same name by Jack Finney. The film stars Campbell Scott and Jennifer Jason Leigh, with David Dukes, Estelle Parsons, Daphne Ashbrook, Myra Carter, Gerrit Graham, Irma P. Hall, and Richard Woods in supporting roles. It premiered on CBS on February 1, 1998, as part of the Hallmark Hall of Fame anthology series.

== Plot ==
In 1863 Boston, Elizabeth Whitcomb writes a letter addressed to "Dearest" (no specific addressee), expressing her desire and hope to someday find someone to truly love. She then places the letter in her writing desk's secret compartment.

In 1998, Scott Corrigan buys an antique desk that the store owner says belonged to a Union general. While re-conditioning it, Scott finds the secret compartment and Elizabeth's letter. His spiritualist-oriented mother believes Scott may be able to communicate with Elizabeth across time and encourages him to reply. She buys an antique postage stamp and tells Scott to mail a letter from a current-day post office that existed in 1863. He writes Elizabeth, saying if she is patient, she will find her true love.

Back in 1863, the local letter carrier delivers Scott's letter to Elizabeth who becomes alarmed reading it. She is shocked that her letter is missing from its secret compartment. She responds to Scott, demanding to know who he is and how he retrieved her letter.

In 1998, Scott hears a sound inside the desk and is astonished to find Elizabeth's second letter. Scott replies, and soon he and Elizabeth are communicating across time. Scott goes to Elizabeth's old home, now owned by Clarisse, the elderly granddaughter of Elizabeth's sister. While learning a bit more about Elizabeth, both Scott and Elizabeth sense each other's presence in the house across time. Their letters gradually become more personal and affectionate and eventually loving, while realising their love is hopeless as 135 years separate them.

Meanwhile, Elizabeth's father is pushing her into a marriage with a kind respectable man who she does not love. Instead, she meets and falls in love with Caleb Denby, a Union Army officer, though she still has feelings for Scott.

Elizabeth writes to Scott about her new romantic interest. He researches Denby's name and learns he was killed at the Battle of Gettysburg. Scott frantically writes to Elizabth to warn Denby to avoid that battle. Scott goes to mail his letter at the old post office only to find it on fire. He barely makes it into the building and mails the letter and escapes before it entirely burns down.

Elizabeth receives Scott's final letter, but with the post office destroyed, they can no longer communicate over time. Elizabeth rushes to Gettysburg but arrives too late. Caleb has been mortally wounded and dies in her arms. Grief-stricken, she returns home and is handed an earlier letter from Scott that was misplaced. It contains a color photo of Scott, who looks exactly like Caleb. Elizabeth realizes that Scott and Caleb are one and the same person. She knows both are lost to her, but swears she will never forget him.

Back in 1998, Scott tells his fiancée, Debra, everything about Elizabeth and that he loves her. Debra reads Elizabeth's letters and also sees a photo of Elizabeth and Caleb, and that Caleb looks identical to Scott. She tearfully breaks off her engagement to Scott.

Scott learns Clarisse has died and the house was left to Maggie, her caretaker and housekeeper. Maggie gives Scott an old wooden box that Clarisse wanted him to have. Inside, Scott finds Elizabeth's poems (they were not in the box before Scott wrote to her), his letters to her, and a worn but clear color photo of Scott, shocking Maggie.

Scott visits Elizabeth's grave site. On her gravestone is carved, "I never forgot." Her birth date is March 23, 1834, and death August 7, 1901 (aged 67). Elizabeth never married. While at the cemetery, Scott meets Beth, who looks exactly like Elizabeth. Scott realizes, as Elizabeth did in her own time, that he is the reincarnation of Caleb and Beth is the reincarnation of Elizabeth. After a brief friendly conversation, Beth suggests having coffee together. The end of the film shows the book of Lizzy's poems featured in a bookstore, having finally been published by Scott.

== Cast ==
- Campbell Scott as Scott Corrigan / Colonel Caleb Denby
- Jennifer Jason Leigh as Elizabeth Whitcomb / Beth, the spitting image of Elizabeth
- David Dukes as Everett Reagle
- Estelle Parsons as Beatrice Corrigan
- Daphne Ashbrook as Debra Zabriskie
- Myra Carter as Clarice Whitcomb
- Gerrit Graham as Warren Whitcomb
- Irma P. Hall as Mae Mullen
- Richard Woods as Jacob Campbell
- Kali Rocha as Flossy Whitcomb
- Laurie Kennedy as Lavinia Whitcomb
- Edgar Smith as Potts, the Postman
- Cara Stoner as Maggie, the Maid
- George Gaffney as Bike Rider
- Tom Riis Farrell as Scott's Boss
- Mark Joy as Celebrity Author
- Linda Powell as Doctor
- Kerri Reardon as Child

== Reception ==
=== Critical response ===
The Love Letter received generally positive reviews. Adam Sandler of Variety praised the film, stating that "Scribe James Henerson admirably stretches the bounds of credulity without breaking them as he weaves an interesting tale" and "The chemistry between Campbell and Jason Leigh is first-rate and their performances are compelling and credible. Director Dan Curtis keeps the pace brisk, knowing when to move the tale along or to slow for some weepy moments that are crucial and never indulgent. He is aided by Eric Van Haren Noman's camerawork, which uses the striking shades of fall to backdrop the story and its emotional underpinnings while soaking in Jan Scott’s lush production design. Bill Blunden's editing makes it all seamless." Will Joyner of The New York Times concluded his review writing "Against considerable creative odds, The Love Letter is its own sort of irresistible page-turner."

=== Accolades ===
Year	Award	Category	Recipient	Result	Ref.
1999	51st Writers Guild of America Awards	Best Long Form – Adapted	James S. Henerson	Won	

== Jack Finney's short story ==
The short story was written by Jack Finney and was first published in The Saturday Evening Post on August 1, 1959. It reprinted in the same magazine in January/February 1988 issue. The story has since appeared in several books.

Original story

In 1959, Jake Belknap, a young, lonely, single man in Brooklyn is looking for used furniture to furnish his recently acquired apartment. Walking in a section of the borough that contains very large, ancient, magnificent mansions about to be torn down, he finds a yard sale of antique furniture from a mansion about to be demolished, and is fascinated by an antique roll-top desk from the 1800s, which he purchases.

After getting the desk home, he opens a drawer and finds original stationery from the previous century, along with several old stamps from that period. He also finds a love letter from a woman named Helen Elizabeth Worley, who lived in the Brooklyn of the 1880s, to a man whom she dreams about, although she is about to be engaged to a man she doesn't love.

Enchanted with the letter, he feels compelled to answer Helen, by writing to her using the old stationery, pen and ink, and putting an 1869 stamp on the letter (from his collection) and mailing it at the old "Wister" post office, which has been around since the 19th century in Brooklyn, unchanged by time.

He returns home and opens the second drawer, to find to his shock, that Helen has received his letter, and she wishes to know who he is and why he has written to her. He writes her another letter, describing who he is, and the fact that he lived in the year 1959 and although they have fallen in love with each other, to meet is impossible because of the years between them. Expecting to receive a final, long love letter from her, he is surprised to find in the bottom drawer, only her picture and the inscription "I will never forget."

After doing research on her whereabouts, he finally finds her grave in a local cemetery, and on her tombstone is engraved, "I never forgot." Miss Worley had died in 1934.

== The differences between the film and the short story ==
1. The film takes place in 1998, whereas in the book, the "modern" year is 1959.
2. The woman in the film, Elizabeth Whitcomb, lives in the American Civil War era, whereas Helen in the short story lives in the 1880s in Brooklyn, New York.
3. Scottie's mother does not appear in the short story at all, but in the film she acts as somewhat of a foil for Scottie.
4. The short story indicates that Helen Elizabeth's desk contains three separate hidden areas. Therefore, Jake is (only) able to receive a total of three letters from Helen. In the film, there is but one hidden compartment, which spawns new letters for Scottie every time Lizzie puts one into the compartment. Thus, in the short story the desk appears not to have any magical element to it.
5. In the film, Scottie enters Elizabeth's house twice and feels a connection to the past that she also feels. Nothing of the sort happens in the story.
6. The short story does not contain either of the additional lookalike characters, so that neither of them ever meets anyone who looks like the person with whom they have corresponded briefly.
7. Elizabeth's poetry, somewhat important in the film, is entirely absent in the short story.
8. In the film, Elizabeth is plagued by headaches; Helen does not have these in the short story.
