= Nigel Triffitt =

Australian theatre director (1949–2012)

Nigel Wilton Triffitt (19 August 1949 – 20 July 2012) was an Australian theatre director, actor, designer and writer.

Triffitt was born in Launceston, Tasmania. His parents were not married, and he was put up for adoption soon after his birth, being adopted by the Triffitt family in Hobart, where he was raised. He studied at the National Institute of Dramatic Art in Sydney and the Drama Centre in London – both of which he was asked to leave. In the 1970s he worked in Melbourne, as Director of Student Theatre at Monash University, Resident Director at St Martin's Theatre. He toured Tasmania and the Australian Capital Territory directing the Yellow Brick Roadshows. He gained prominence in 1978 as the creator of Momma's Little Horror Show, a mixture of adult puppet theatre and visual theatre. Later works included Secrets (1983) and The Fall of Singapore (1987). Later he moved into directing dance, in collaboration with the Australian Dance Theatre, with Wildstars (1979) and High Flyers (1985).

Triffitt also designed and directed operas for the Melbourne International Arts Festival: Metamorphosis (1984), Samson and Delilah (1984), and Moby Dick (1990), and revivals of the musicals Hair (1991) and The Rocky Horror Show (1992). He also prepared the libretto to Neil Clifton's 1984 unrealised opera based on Evelyn Waugh's novel The Loved One, while Clifton Composer-in-residence with the Victoria State Opera. As an actor, he appeared in films such as Howling V: The Rebirth (1989).

Triffitt achieved commercial success with the tap dance show Tap Dogs, which he designed (in collaboration with Dein Perry) and directed. Tap Dogs premiered at the Sydney Festival in 1995 and continued to tour around the world until his death. He devised, designed and directed part of the Opening Ceremony for the Sydney Olympic Games in 2000 and the Opening Ceremony of the Melbourne Commonwealth Games in 2006.

Triffitt had a reputation for being outspoken and opinionated. A journalist wrote in 1987: "Nigel Triffit enjoys criticism. He doesn't mind being called rude, enfant terrible or genius. It's bland reporting with no comment that bores him." He was openly gay. In 1994 he published a gay-themed novel Cheap Thrills. Despite not being a Triffitt by birth, he maintained a blog on the history of the Triffitt family. Nigel had lived with AIDS for many years, and died of a stroke at home in Melbourne.
