= Time and Again (Finney novel) =

1970 novel by Jack Finney

- First edition cover
- Author: Jack Finney
- Language: English
- Genre: Science fiction
- Publisher: Simon & Schuster
- Publication date: 1970
- Publication place: United States
- Media type: Print (Hardcover, Paperback)
- Pages: 304
- ISBN: 0-671-24295-4 (first edition, hardcover)
- OCLC: 84586

Time and Again is a 1970 illustrated novel by American writer Jack Finney.

The many illustrations in the book are real; though, as explained in an endnote, not all are from 1882, the year in which the main action of the book takes place.

A sequel, From Time to Time (1995), was published during the final year of the author's life. The book left room for a third novel, apparently never written.

In the afterword of 11/22/63, Stephen King states that Time and Again is "in this writer’s humble opinion, the great time-travel story." He had originally intended to dedicate his book to Jack Finney.

== Plot ==
In 1970, commercial artist Si Morley is recruited by a secret government project. He is taken to a warehouse in New York City where a section of Manhattan circa 1880 has been staged, occupied by people in period costume. The project is to determine whether self-hypnosis can be used to effect time travel.

Si has his own reason to visit the City in that period. His girlfriend, Kate, has uncovered a mystery from 1882, in the form of two letters. One, received by Andrew Carmody, an associate of Grover Cleveland, discusses a trade in marble. The second is a burned but mostly legible note in which Carmody takes the blame for "the destruction by fire of the entire World", before committing suicide.

The project manager, Danziger, permits Si to attempt a trip to observe the mailing of the first letter, based on its postmark. Danziger wishes he could go along to witness the first meeting of his late parents around that time. The project has rented an apartment in The Dakota, a period structure with a view of Central Park largely unchanged since 1882, for use as a launching site.

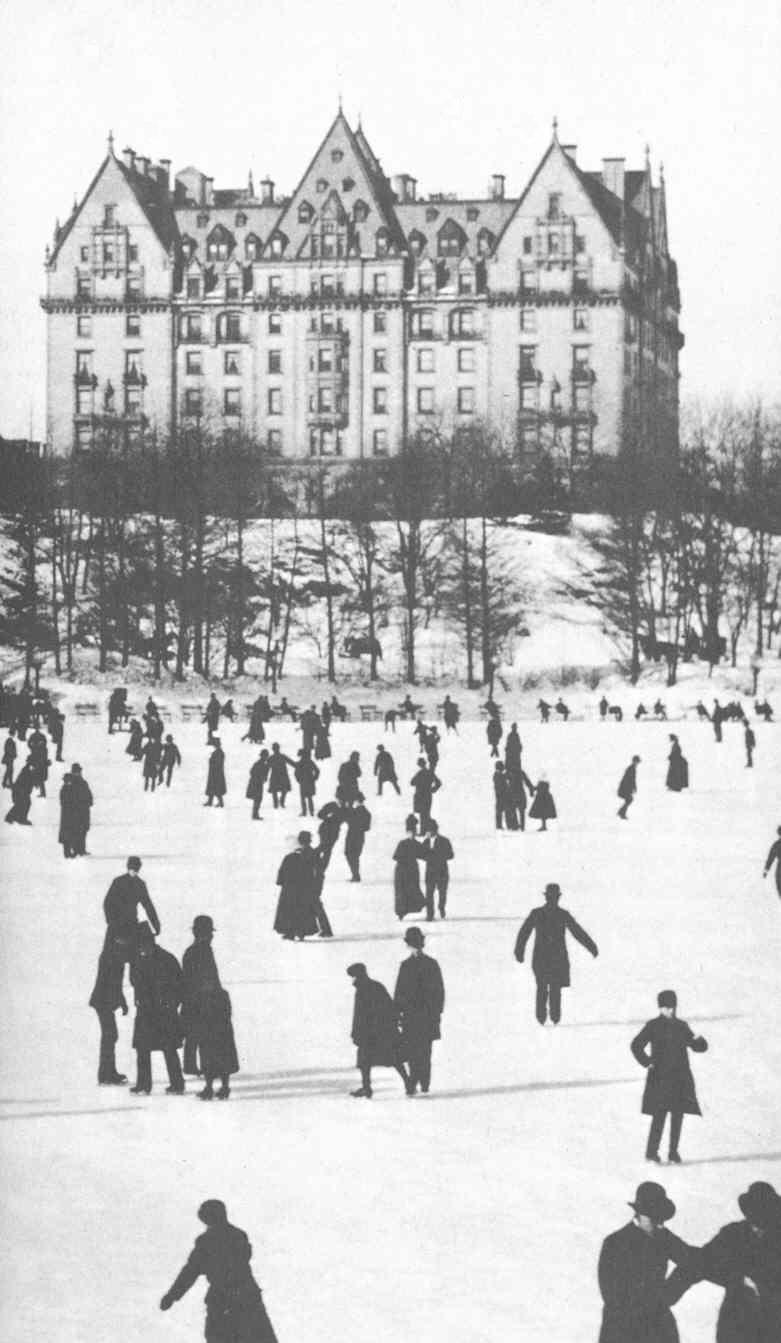
The Dakota in winter. This image appears in Chapter 17 of the novel.

Si's first attempt is successful, but brief. On his second attempt, he takes Kate along. They take a horse-drawn bus to the post office where the letter was mailed, and follow the mailer to a boarding house at 19 Gramercy Park. They return to the present.

After each trip, Si is debriefed to ensure no changes have been made to the present. He returns to the past and takes a room at 19 Gramercy Park. He spends days sketching the City. He identifies the mailer as Jake Pickering, and discovers he is blackmailing Carmody. Si falls in love with the landlady's niece, Julia Charbonneau, who is romantically involved with Pickering. Pickering becomes aggressive toward Si, and Si returns to the present.

Another project member who has returned from Denver circa 1900 has made a change to the present: a man whom Si remembers has never been born. Danziger insists on stopping the project, but is overruled. He resigns. Si, troubled, is sent to the past.

He finds Pickering and Julia happily engaged. Posing as a detective, he tries to convince Julia that Pickering is a blackmailer. They hide in Pickering's office in the New York World building to witness Carmody's blackmail payment. Instead, Carmody knocks out Pickering and ransacks the office for hours, searching for the blackmail evidence. Unsuccessful, he torches Pickering's files. Pickering revives and tries to quench the fire but is badly burned. Si and Julia barely escape with their lives.

Days later, NYPD Inspector Thomas Byrnes collects them and takes them to the Carmody house, where the heavily bandaged Carmody accuses them of murdering Pickering and starting the blaze. Byrnes allows them to leave, but has arranged that this will be seen as an escape from custody, implying their guilt. They hide in an arm of the unassembled Statue of Liberty, on display in Madison Square. Si tries to explain the project to Julia, who believes he is spinning a fantasy. Si takes her to the present. Julia observes the dawn from the upright arm of the completed statue, and is horrified by the changes she sees in the City.

They realize their accuser was actually Pickering, and that Carmody must have died in the fire. Julia realizes she can use the truth to force Pickering to ensure her safety, and returns to the past on her own.

Si gives a detailed report, but omits Julia's trip to the present. The project director wants Si to deliberately alter the past. Researchers have confirmed that Pickering—posing as Carmody—dissuaded Cleveland from purchasing Cuba from Spain, eventually resulting in the Castro regime. Si seeks advice from Danziger, who tries to convince him not to take the assignment.

Si returns to 1882. He prevents Danziger's parents from meeting, resulting in Danziger never having been born and the project never occurring. Si returns to Gramercy Park and Julia.

== Reception ==
After criticizing unrealistic science fiction, Carl Sagan in 1978 listed Time and Again as among stories "that are so tautly constructed, so rich in the accommodating details of an unfamiliar society that they sweep me along before I have even a chance to be critical."

== Audio version ==
In 1995 Simon & Schuster released abridged audio versions of both Time and Again and From Time to Time. They are read by Campbell Scott, and each are 4.5 hours in length.

== Related films ==
Though a film of this novel has never been made, a 1980 film, Somewhere in Time features a similar time travel technique. Based on the 1975 Richard Matheson novel Bid Time Return, the film concerns a young man, Richard Collier, unhappy with his life as a playwright, who travels back in time through self-hypnosis, coached by his former college professor, one "Dr. Gerard Finney".

On July 25, 2012, it was announced that Lionsgate studios optioned the film rights to the novel, with Doug Liman set to direct and produce.
