= The Ledge (short story) =

Short story by Stephen King

- Short story by Stephen King
- Country: United States
- Language: English
- Genres: Suspense, thriller short story

Publication
- Published in: Penthouse
- Media type: Print (magazine)
- Publication date: July 1976

Chronology
"Weeds"	"I Know What You Need"

"The Ledge" is a short story by Stephen King, first published in the July 1976 issue of Penthouse, and later collected in King's 1978 collection Night Shift.

== Plot summary ==
King employs a first person narrator and opens with the protagonist, Stan Norris, in the clutches of Cressner, a wealthy, cruel crime boss. Cressner intends to get revenge on Norris, who has been having an affair with his wife. Instead of killing him outright, Cressner reveals his penchant for striking wagers and offers a chilling ultimatum: if Norris is able to circumnavigate the 5-inch ledge surrounding the multi-story building where Cressner lives in his penthouse, he can have Cressner's wife and $20,000. If Norris refuses, he will be framed for heroin possession and never see his lover again. Cressner also reveals that he has done this to six others, three professional athletes who crossed his path and three ordinary people who got into serious debt with Cressner. Not once has Cressner lost the wager.

Seemingly without any other choice, Norris accepts the wager and proceeds to make his way carefully around the building's cold, windswept exterior. He encounters multiple obstacles, particularly from the wind and an obstinate pigeon. Norris completes the harrowing ordeal, only to discover that Cressner has already murdered his wife. Cressner slyly claims that he never welches on his bets and that, while the heroin has been removed from Norris' car and the money is his for the taking, his wife's fate was sealed before the wager was even made. Enraged, Norris overpowers Cressner's bodyguard and obtains his gun. When Cressner pleads for his life, Norris proposes to spare him but only if he is able to complete a trip around the ledge. However, while waiting for Cressner to circumnavigate the building, Norris reveals to the reader that: "Cressner said he's never welched on a bet. But I've been known to."

== Publication ==
King wrote "The Ledge" as a homage to the 1956 story "Contents of the Dead Man's Pocket" by Jack Finney. It was first published in the July 1976 issue of Penthouse. In 1978, "The Ledge" was collected in King's book of short stories Night Shift. In 1988, "The Ledge" was included in the anthology work Pan Book of Horror Stories: Volume 29.

== Adaptations ==
"The Ledge" was dramatized as a section of the film Cat's Eye, starring Robert Hays as Norris and Kenneth McMillan as Cressner. Unlike the story, where Cressner leaves Norris mostly alone on the ledge, Cressner resorts to tricks, ranging from childish pranks using a toot horn to blasting the protagonist with a fire hose should he linger around a roomier sector of the ledge. One notable scene in the film version is when Cressner's bodyguard is killed and Cressner is overpowered; he is seen stumbling by an issue of Penthouse, the magazine in which the story was first published. The film did give a decisive ending for Cressner, as the implied one from the story would not have been as satisfying to theatrical audiences. Norris did not need to welch on his bet, as a frightened Cressner is knocked off balance by the pigeon. He falls off the ledge and lands on the same toot horn he used to tease the protagonist.

In 1982, an interlude or vignette entitled "Vertigo" outside the main continuity of the graphic novel V for Vendetta was published which used the same basic idea of a man being forced to traverse a narrow ledge around a tall building. V for Vendetta was being published serially in the U.K. comic anthology magazine Warrior at the time. The vignette was later republished in the eponymous 10-issue 1988 DC Comics imprint (issue #7) and has been included in subsequent graphic novel compilations.

== Reception ==
Tony Magistrate describes "The Ledge" as "King's descriptive abilities at their very best", noting King's "ability to maintain levels of suspense because the imaginary world he portrays is so accurately visual".

== See also ==
- "Contents of the Dead Man's Pocket"
- Stephen King short fiction bibliography
