= Cat's Eye (1985 film) =

1985 American anthology horror film directed by Lewis Teague

- Theatrical release poster
- Directed by: Lewis Teague
- Written by: Stephen King
- Based on: "Quitters, Inc." and "The Ledge" by Stephen King
- Produced by: Dino De Laurentiis; Martha Schumacher
- Starring: Drew Barrymore; James Woods; Alan King; Kenneth McMillan; Robert Hays; Candy Clark
- Cinematography: Jack Cardiff
- Edited by: Scott Conrad
- Music by: Alan Silvestri
- Production company: De Laurentiis Entertainment Group
- Distributed by: MGM/UA Entertainment Co.
- Release date: April 12, 1985
- Running time: 94 minutes
- Country: United States
- Language: English
- Budget: $7 million
- Box office: $13.1 million or $3.5 million (North America)

Cat's Eye (also known as Stephen King's Cat's Eye) is a 1985 American anthology horror thriller film directed by Lewis Teague and written by Stephen King. It comprises three stories: "Quitters, Inc.", "The Ledge", and "General". The first two are adaptations of short stories in King's 1978 Night Shift collection, and the third is unique to the film. The cast includes Drew Barrymore, James Woods, Alan King, Robert Hays, and Candy Clark. The three stories are connected by the presence of a traveling cat and Barrymore, both of whom play incidental roles in the first two and major characters in the third.

== Plot ==
A stray tabby cat hides from a dog in a delivery truck, which drives to New York City. The cat sees the disembodied image of a young girl pleading for help and is picked up by a man.

=== "Quitters, Inc." ===
Dick Morrison is advised by a friend to join Quitters, Inc., an organization formed by a former mob group, to quit his smoking habit. The clinic supervisor, Vinnie Donatti, explains that the clinic has a 100% success rate due to brutal methods: every time Dick smokes, ruthless consequences will befall his loved ones.

Donatti demonstrates the first of these consequences on the cat which is put in a cage and tormented with electric shocks coming from the floor. He explains that if he smokes, his wife Cindy will be shocked in front of him. For subsequent infractions, his daughter Alicia will be shocked, then Cindy will be raped. Finally, Dick himself will be killed. He hides the threats from his family, threats that are serious as Dick suspects he is being watched day and night.

During a traffic jam, Dick smokes after finding an old pack of cigarettes and is caught. Before watching Cindy suffer in the electric cage, Dick fights back and fails as the tomcat escapes. Dick tells Cindy everything and eventually quits smoking for good, but he has gained weight due to quitting. Donatti sets a target weight for him and informs that if it's not met that someone will cut off his wife's little finger, which is also proved later not to be an idle threat as they had done this before to the wife of his friend.

=== "The Ledge" ===
The Tomcat travels to Atlantic City, New Jersey, where it sees the same disembodied girl's image once again asking for his help.

After a road incident the tomcat is taken to the home of Cressner, a crime boss and casino owner who wagers on anything. Cressner has Johnny Norris kidnapped for having an affair with his wife and blackmails him into circumnavigating the exterior ledge of his penthouse. If he succeeds, he will gift him with cash and his wife. If Norris refuses, the police will arrest him for possession of drugs that have been planted in his car.

Cressner taunts Norris through this ordeal by various means, and a pigeon lands beside him and pecks at his foot. Norris eventually returns to the penthouse. Cressner says that he will honor the bet: his butler Albert removes the drugs and presents him with a bag of cash and his wife's head.

Norris attacks him, while the cat trips Albert who drops his gun. Norris seizes the gun and kills Albert, then threatens Cressner. Norris forces Cressner to circumnavigate the ledge next. The escaping cat watches as Cressner is attacked by the pigeon and falls to his death.

=== "General" ===
The cat travels onward to Wilmington, North Carolina; there he is adopted by Amanda, the girl who was asking for his help earlier. She names him General. Her mother dislikes cats and, despite Amanda's protests, puts General outside at night.

Amanda is in mortal danger from a small, malevolent troll that has intruded into the house. That night, the troll emerges via a hole in one of the walls in her room. The troll slays Polly, Amanda's pet bird, and then tries to supernaturally steal Amanda's breath. General finds a way into the house and chases the troll out but not before it wounds General with its dagger. Amanda and her parents discover the dead bird.

Amanda's mother is convinced that General killed Polly, and she takes him to an animal shelter to be euthanized. That night, the troll returns and uses a doorstop to wedge Amanda's door shut, before attempting to steal her breath again. General escapes the shelter and rushes back to save Amanda. He fights with the troll and kills it by sending it flying into an electric fan.

After her parents break into the room, they discover parts of the troll's corpse, as well as the tiny dagger and the hole in the wall that the troll used. General is rewarded with a large fish, then climbs onto bed with Amanda. She wakes up and cuddles him.

== Cast ==
- Drew Barrymore as Amanda
- James Woods as Dick Morrison
- Alan King as Dr. Vinny Donatti
- Mary D'Arcy as Cindy Morrison
- Robert Hays as Johnny Norris
- Kenneth McMillan as Cressner
- Candy Clark as Sally Ann
- James Naughton as Hugh
- James Rebhorn as Drunk Businessman
- Charles S. Dutton as Dom
- Mike Starr as Ducky

== Production ==
In 1978, producer Milton Subotsky and his company Sword & Sorcery Productions optioned the Stephen King short stories Quitters, Inc., The Ledge, and Sometimes They Come Back from collection Night Shift with the intention of combining them into an anthology film titled Fright Night. A screenplay was written by Edward and Valerie Abraham and the film made it to pre-production, but after failing to acquire financial backing Subotsky sold his options to Dino De Laurentiis with Subotsky retaining a co-producer's credit as well as input on script, casting, and editing. After being impressed with Drew Barrymore's performance in his production of Firestarter, De Laurentiis asked King to write a brand new story tailored specifically for Barrymore, which would then be incorporated into a story with Quitters Inc. and The Ledge and serving as the basis for Cat's Eye.

== Release and reception ==
Cat's Eye was released theatrically in the United States by MGM on April 12, 1985. It grossed $13,086,298 at the domestic box office.

Roger Ebert gave the film three stars out of four and wrote, "Stephen King seems to be working his way through the reference books of human phobias, and Cat's Eye is one of his most effective films." Vincent Canby of The New York Times called the film "the best screen adaptation of any of King's work since Brian De Palma's Carrie" and "pop movie making of an extremely clever, stylish and satisfying order." Variety wrote, "The three stories just don't connect and efforts to join them never work. However, an excellent roster of talent does try its best." Gene Siskel of the Chicago Tribune gave the film two-and-a-half stars out of four and wrote that the opening story "is so funny and so fresh that it's a shock and a disappointment to see it come to an end in a half-hour. The movie's second short story is as dull as can be; No. 3 is kind of fun; so it all adds up to a better-than-average entertainment that sags terribly in the middle." Kevin Thomas of the Los Angeles Times stated that "the special effects are impeccable and Giorgio Postiglione's production design meticulous and inspired. Yet it's the well-drawn characters, plus the brisk, stylish direction of Teague and superb camerawork of Cardiff, that make it work." Paul Attanasio of The Washington Post wrote that all the stories "repeat the same formula," but the middle one was "the most fun, because of the presence of the peerless Kenneth McMillan," who "plays here with a good-humored burlesque that recalls Jackie Gleason." Kim Newman of The Monthly Film Bulletin thought the film "would have been sub-standard even as one of the formula Amicus anthologies of the 60s and 70s," adding, "Despite a few good performances (James Woods, Kenneth McMillan), the film, like Creepshow before it, is continually let down by the weak punch lines King provides for his promising anecdotes." On Rotten Tomatoes, the film has a 70% rating based on 30 reviews. The critical consensus reads: "An effective if knowingly silly Stephen King anthology that combines comedy and terror." On Metacritic the film has a score of 70% based on reviews from 12 critics.

Neil Gaiman reviewed Cat's Eye for Imagine magazine, stating it was "Funny, scary, and one of the best King movies so far."

The film was released on VHS in 1985 by Key Video and in 1987 by both VHS and Laserdisc by CBS/Fox Video, and later on DVD by Warner Home Video in 2002, and on Blu-ray in 2016.

== Awards ==
The film was nominated for the International Fantasy Film Award for Best Film in 1987. Drew Barrymore was nominated for the Young Artist Award for Best Starring Performance by a Young Actress in a Motion Picture in 1986.

== See also ==
- Creepshow
- Sometimes They Come Back (film)
- List of adaptations of works by Stephen King
