= Contents of the Dead Man's Pocket =

- Short story by Jack Finney
- Country: United States of America
- Language: English
- Genre: Suspense

Publication
- Published in: Good Housekeeping, Collier's
- Publication date: June 1956

"Contents of the Dead Man's Pocket" is a short story by the American writer Jack Finney, first published in 1956.

== Plot summary ==
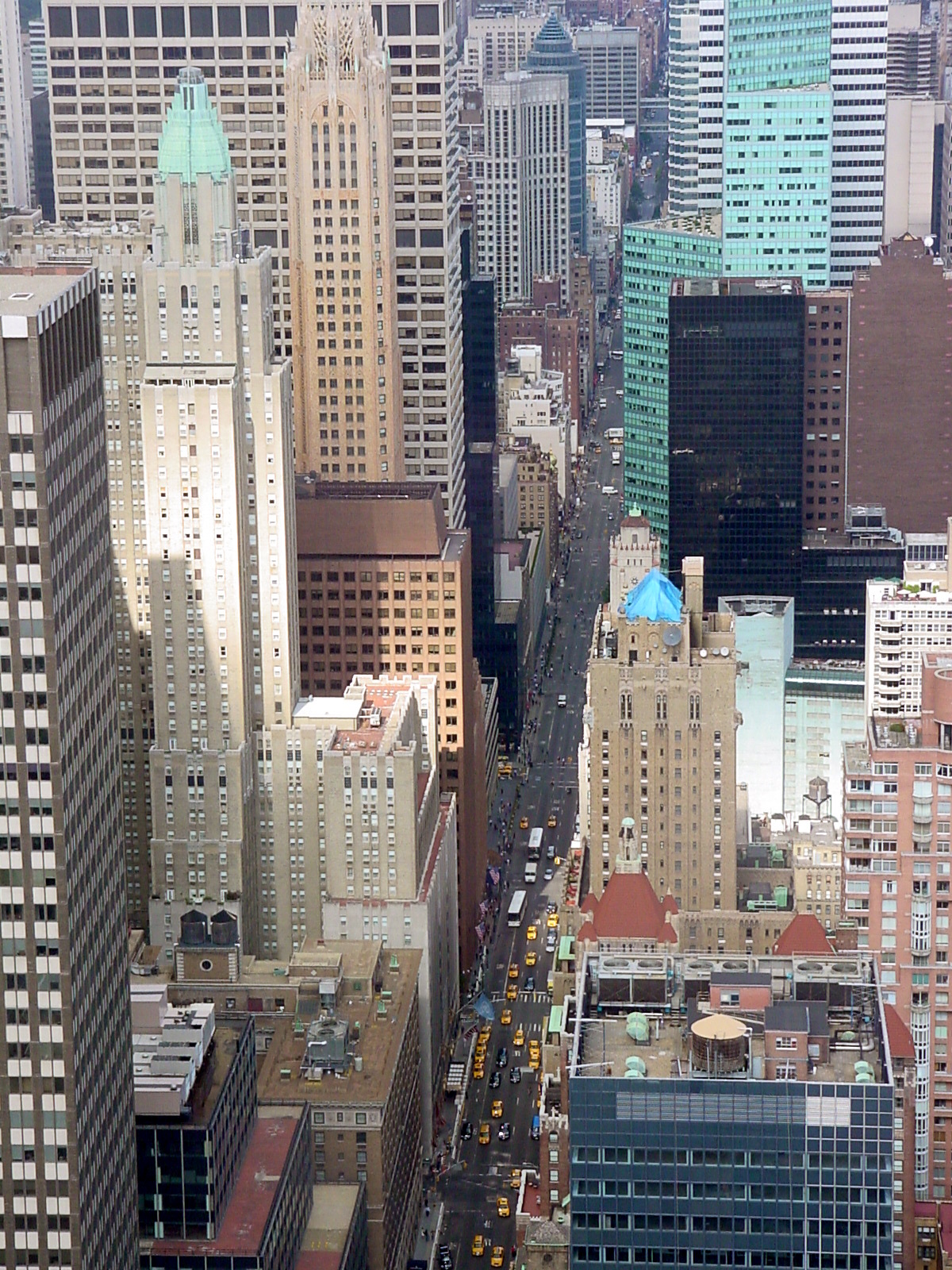
"Contents of the Dead Man's Pocket" takes place on a narrow ledge eleven storeys above Lexington Avenue.

Tom Benecke is an ambitious young advertiser working for Wholesale Groceries who lives with his wife Clare in an eleventh-floor apartment above Lexington Avenue in New York City. One autumn night, Tom declines an invitation from Clare to accompany her to the cinema, opting instead to work on a side project that he believes will help mark him out for a promotion. As his wife leaves, a breeze blows a sheet of paper containing weeks of Tom's research out of the window and onto the corner of the ornamental ledge below the window. Tom rashly decides to climb out of the window and edge 15 feet (4.57 metres) along the ledge – which is as wide as his shoe length – to retrieve the sheet of paper.

Avoiding looking down, Tom makes it to the sheet of paper without issue, but when bending over to pick it up he glimpses the ground far below and panics. After nearly falling, he is paralyzed with fear. He eventually regains his composure and makes his way back to the window, but accidentally knocks it shut, trapping him on the ledge. Realizing that he will fall long before his wife returns home to open the window, Tom unsuccessfully attempts to summon help by dropping letters which he sets on fire and coins. Tom imagines people being unable to identify his body, or make any sense of the shorthand text on the sheet of paper in his pocket, and experiences regret about working over spending time with his wife, reflecting on his "wasted life".

Tom eventually resolves to attempt to punch through the window, knowing that if the blow rebounds he will undoubtedly fall backwards to his death. The blow succeeds, and he falls to safety into the room. Tom deposits the sheet of paper on a table and leaves the apartment to catch up with his wife. As he leaves the apartment, another breeze blows the sheet of paper out of the window once more. Having had his perspective changed by the experience, Tom merely laughs and pays it no heed.

== Publication ==
"Contents of the Dead Man's Pocket" was initially published in Good Housekeeping in June 1956 and in Collier's in October 1956. In 1957, it was collected in Finney's book The Third Level. It has since been widely anthologized, including in the inaugural edition of the Pan Book of Horror Stories (1959).

== Reception ==
The publisher Gale described "Contents of the Dead Man's Pocket" as "one of Finney's best". Jack Seabrook described it as an "outstanding suspense tale". David Murdock interpreted the story as "a warning about maintaining what we call today a good 'work–life balance'." Writing for CinemaBlend, Jason Wiese described the story as "an intense, thought-provoking parable about reevaluating life's priorities that [...] would work great as an episode of an anthology TV show like Black Mirror or Cabinet of Curiosities".

"Contents of the Dead Man's Pocket" is "much taught at the secondary school level."

Stephen King's 1976 short story "The Ledge" is a homage to "Contents of the Dead Man's Pocket".

== See also ==
- "The Ledge"
