= Such Interesting Neighbors =

- Short story by Jack Finney
- Country: United States of America
- Language: English
- Genre(s): Science fiction

Publication
- Published in: Collier's
- Publication date: January 1951

"Such Interesting Neighbors" is a science fiction short story by the American writer Jack Finney, first published in 1951. Versions of the story adapted for television aired as episodes of Science Fiction Theatre and Amazing Stories.

== Plot summary ==
The story deals with the narrative of Al and Nell Lewis's encounters with their new neighbors, the Hellenbeks. As the plot progresses, the Hellenbeks' interactive manners and general behavior puzzle Al Lewis, who seeks to uncover the cause of their uncommon ways. Towards the end of the story it is revealed that the Hellenbeks are time travellers from a future era. As their world was on the brink of global war, inexpensive time machines became available for the general public to cause a diversion from the extremely unfavorable conditions. However, much of the population, including the Hellenbeks, used them to settle in past eras and caused severe depopulation, which made the waging of war impossible, while eventually the remaining population migrated as well.

== Adaptations ==
"Such Interesting Neighbors" was first adapted for Science Fiction Theatre and aired as its second episode on April 16, 1955, as "Time Is Just a Place". On March 20, 1987, a second adaptation of the story aired under its original title for Amazing Stories.
