= Jack Finney =

American author (1911–1995)

- Born: John Finney; October 2, 1911; Milwaukee, Wisconsin, United States
- Died: November 14, 1995 (aged 84); Greenbrae, California, United States
- Education: Knox College (1934)
- Occupations: Novelist, short story writer
- Writing career
- Period: 1946–1995
- Genres: Noir fiction, science fiction, thrillers, comedy
- Subject: 19th century American history
- Notable works: The Body Snatchers; Time and Again
- Notable awards: World Fantasy Award—Life Achievement (1987)

Walter Braden "Jack" Finney (born John Finney; October 2, 1911 – November 14, 1995) was an American writer. His best-known works are science fiction and thrillers, including The Body Snatchers and Time and Again. Themes that persisted throughout his career were a fascination with previous time periods and time travel, and ordinary people encountering extraordinary circumstances. Many of his works were adapted into films or television productions.

== Early life and education ==
John "Jack" Finney was born in Milwaukee, Wisconsin. After his father died when Finney was three years old, he was renamed Walter Braden Finney in honor of his father, but continued to be known as "Jack".

He attended Knox College in Galesburg, Illinois, graduating in 1934.

== Early career ==
In the 1940s, Finney moved to New York City, where he worked as an advertising copywriter. While holding a full-time job and raising a young family, he wrote fiction in the evenings, eventually selling short stories to magazines.

== Writing career ==
Finney's first article, "Someone Who Knows Told Me...", published in the December 1943 issue of Cosmopolitan, has been described in later sources as reflecting the wartime message of the U.S. Office of War Information’s "Loose lips sink ships" campaign.

His story "The Widow's Walk" won a contest sponsored by Ellery Queen's Mystery Magazine in 1946. His first novel, 5 Against the House, was published in 1954. It was made into a movie the following year.

Finney's story "Such Interesting Neighbors" (Collier's, 6 January 1951) was the basis for the second episode of Science Fiction Theatre, entitled "Time Is Just a Place". It was first broadcast on 16 April 1955. It co-starred Don DeFore and Warren Stevens; it was then published in 1957, in the collection The Third Level by Rhinehart and Company; later, the story appeared as an episode of the Steven Spielberg-created anthology series Amazing Stories, starring Adam Ant and Marcia Strassman. Spielberg's version was first broadcast on 20 March 1987.

Finney's breakout success came in 1955 with The Body Snatchers, followed by a steady career as a novelist and short-story writer. The Body Snatchers (1955) was the basis for the 1956 movie Invasion of the Body Snatchers and multiple remakes.

Another novel, Assault on a Queen (1959), became the film Assault on a Queen with Frank Sinatra as the leader of a gang that pulls a daring robbery of the RMS Queen Mary.

Finney's 1959 short story "The Love Letter", which appeared in The Saturday Evening Post, was adapted in 1998 into the television movie The Love Letter, starring Campbell Scott and Jennifer Jason Leigh.

His comedic novel Good Neighbor Sam (1963) was inspired by his early career in the advertising business; it was adapted into a 1964 film starring Jack Lemmon.

In addition to his fiction, Finney wrote two plays. Telephone Roulette: A Comedy in One Act (1956) is a short romantic one-act comedy adapted from an earlier, unpublished story ("Take a Number"). This Winter’s Hobby (1966) is a three-act melodrama that premiered in New Haven and Philadelphia, centering on a middle-aged businessman blackmailed by two young men into performing a series of humiliating tasks. Although there were plans to move the play to Broadway, it closed after its regional runs, and the script remains obscure.

Finney's greatest success came with his science fiction novel Time and Again (1970). Its protagonist, Simon Morley, is working in advertising in New York City when he is recruited for a secret government project to achieve time travel. Morley travels to the New York City of 1882. The novel is notable for Finney's vivid and detailed picture of life in the city at that time and for the art and photographs supposedly made by Morley during his experiences, which are reproduced in the pages of the novel. Morley sees many actual historical sites, some now gone (e.g., the post office that, until 1939, stood in what is now the southern tip of City Hall Park) and some still existing (e.g., St. Patrick's Cathedral, then the tallest building in its Fifth Avenue neighborhood).

In 1995, twenty-five years after Time and Again, Finney published a sequel called From Time to Time featuring the further adventures of Morley, this time centering on Manhattan in 1912. Finney died at the age of 84, not long after publishing the book.

== Themes ==
Scholars and critics frequently note Finney's sustained fascination with time and time travel, which became one of the defining through-lines of his work. The Encyclopedia of Science Fiction observes that from early in his career he repeatedly "experimented" with time-travel concepts in short fiction — most famously in "The Third Level" (1950), about a man who accidentally wanders onto the third level of New York's Grand Central Terminal. He soon realizes that he has stumbled upon a direct passage to 1894. The 1951 story "I'm Scared" told the tale of a man wearing 19th-century clothes who was hit by a car in 1951. Finney's 1968 novel The Woodrow Wilson Dime again explored the possibilities of time travel; "the dime of the title allows the novel's hero to enter a parallel world in which he achieves fame by composing the musicals of Oscar Hammerstein and inventing the zipper". Finney again explored the theme at novel length in Time and Again (1970) and its sequel From Time to Time (1995). These novels, and the stories — collected in About Time (1986, Simon & Schuster) — helped solidify his reputation for imaginative treatments of altered or overlapping timelines.

Another consistent motif identified in criticism is Finney's focus on ordinary individuals placed in extraordinary or uncanny situations. As a writer, he excelled at depicting the collision of the everyday and the fantastic, highlighting how commonplace settings and unassuming protagonists form the backdrop for sudden incursions of the mysterious or supernatural. This interplay between the familiar and the fantastical, whether through time travel or subtle shifts in reality, became central to his appeal across short stories and novels.

== Personal life and death ==
Finney married Marguerite Guest, and they had two children: Kenneth and Marguerite. He moved with his family to California in the early 1950s, eventually setting in Mill Valley.

Finney was a shy and private man, who rarely granted interviews. For decades he declined publicity and avoided public literary life, speaking to journalists only late in his career. A 1995 New York Times Magazine article noted his quiet routines and strong attachment to family life, including the support he received from his wife and children. It also highlighted his eccentric streak, reflected in his lifelong fascination with the past, his habit of collecting old magazines and photographs, and the deep personal pleasure he took in researching earlier eras.

Finney died of pneumonia and emphysema in Greenbrae, California, at the age of 84.

== Awards ==
In 1987, Finney was given the World Fantasy Award—Life Achievement at the World Fantasy Convention, held in Nashville, Tennessee.

The Third Level, Knox College's online science fiction and fantasy publication, is named for alumnus Finney's short story "The Third Level", published in The Magazine of Fantasy & Science Fiction in October 1952.

== Works ==
=== Short stories ===
- "Someone Who Knows Told Me..." [nonfiction] (Cosmopolitan, December 1943)
- "The Widow's Walk" (Ellery Queen's Mystery Magazine, July 1947)
- "Manhattan Idyl" (Collier's, April 1947)
- "I'm Mad at You" (Collier's, December 1947)
- "Breakfast in Bed" (Collier's, May 1948)
- "It Wouldn't Be Fair" (Collier's, August 1948) - Also published in Ellery Queen's Mystery Magazine
- "You Haven't Changed a Bit" (Collier's, April 1949)
- "The Little Courtesies" (Collier's, June 1949)
- "A Dash of Spring" (Cosmopolitan, June 1949)
- "Week-end Genius" (Collier's, May 1950)
- "I Like It This Way" (Collier's, June 1950)
- "My Cigarette Loves Your Cigarette" (Collier's, September 1950)
- "Such Interesting Neighbors" (Collier's, January 1951)
- "One Man Show" (Collier's, June 1951)
- "I'm Scared" (Collier's, September 1951)
- "It Wouldn't be Fair" (Ellery Queen's Mystery Magazine, November 1951)
- "Obituary" (co-written with C. J. Durban) (Collier's, February 1952)
- "The Third Level" (The Magazine of Fantasy & Science Fiction, October 1952)
- "Quit Zoomin' Those Hands Through the Air" (The Magazine of Fantasy & Science Fiction, December 1952)
- "Of Missing Persons" (Good Housekeeping, March 1955)
- "Man of Confidence" (Good Housekeeping, September 1955)
- "Second Chance" (Good Housekeeping, April 1956)
- "Contents of the Dead Man's Pocket" (Good Housekeeping, June 1956)
- "The Love Letter" (Saturday Evening Post, August 1, 1959) [Also re-published in January/February 1988 issue of Saturday Evening Post]
- "The U-19’s Last Kill" (Saturday Evening Post, six-part series, beginning August 22, 1959, and ending September 26, 1959)
- "The Other Wife" (also known as "The Coin Collector") (Saturday Evening Post, January 30, 1960)
- "An Old Tune" (also known as "Home Alone") (McCall's, October 1961)
- "Old Enough for Love" (McCall's, May 1962)
- "The Sunny Side of the Street" (McCall's, October 1962)
- "Time Has No Boundaries" (also known as "The Face in the Photo") (Saturday Evening Post, October 13, 1962)
- "Hey, Look at Me!" (Playboy, September 1962)
- "The Man with the Magic Glasses" (also known as "Lunch Hour Magic") (McCall's, March 1962)
- "Where the Cluetts Are" (McCall's, January 1962)

=== Novels ===
Several Finney novels were adapted as feature films (†); see below.

- 5 Against the House (Doubleday & Co., 1954) †
- The Body Snatchers (Dell Publishing, 1955) †
- The House of Numbers (Dell Publishing, 1957) †
- Assault on a Queen (Simon & Schuster, 1959) †
- Good Neighbor Sam (Fireside Books, 1963) †
- The Woodrow Wilson Dime (Simon & Schuster, 1968)
- Time and Again (Simon & Schuster, 1970) ISBN 0-671-24295-4
- Marion's Wall (Simon & Schuster, 1973), ISBN 9780671214678
- The Night People (Doubleday, 1977) ISBN 978-0385130295
- From Time to Time (Simon & Schuster, 1995), ISBN 978-0-671-89884-7 – sequel to Time and Again

=== Collections ===
- The Third Level [short stories] (Rinehart & Company, 1957); published in the U.K. as The Clock of Time (Eyre & Spottiswoode, 1958)
- I Love Galesburg in the Springtime [short stories] (Simon & Schuster, 1964); published in the U.K. as I Love Galesburg in the Springtime: Fantasy and Time Stories (Eyre & Spottiswoode, 1965) ISBN 9780330020213
- Forgotten News: The Crime of the Century and Other Lost Stories [nonfiction] (Doubleday, 1983), ISBN ISBN 9780385177214
- About Time: Twelve Stories [short stories about time and time travel from The Third Level and I Love Galesburg in the Springtime] (Fireside / Simon & Schuster, 1986), ISBN ISBN 9780671628871
- Three by Finney [omnibus edition of The Woodrow Wilson Dime, Marion's Wall, and The Night People] (Atria / Simon & Schuster, 1987), ISBN ISBN 9780671640484

=== Plays ===
- Telephone Roulette: A Comedy in One Act (Dramatic Publishing Company, 1956)
- This Winter's Hobby: A Play (Studio Duplicating Service, 1966)

=== Film adaptations ===
- 5 Against the House — 1955 Phil Karlson film starring Guy Madison, Kim Novak, and Brian Keith
- Invasion of the Body Snatchers — 1956 Don Siegel film starring Kevin McCarthy, Dana Wynter and Larry Gates
- House of Numbers — 1957 Russell Rouse film noir starring Jack Palance
- Good Neighbor Sam — 1964 David Swift film starring Jack Lemmon, Romy Schneider, and Dorothy Provine
- Assault on a Queen — 1966 Jack Donohue film based on "The U-19's Last Kill" starring Frank Sinatra, Virna Lisi, and Anthony Franciosa
- Dead of Night — 1977 Dan Curtis film based on "Second Chance" starring Edward James Begley Jr.
- Invasion of the Body Snatchers — 1978 remake by Philip Kaufman starring Donald Sutherland, Brooke Adams, Jeff Goldblum, and Leonard Nimoy
- Maxie — 1985 Paul Aaron film starring Glenn Close, Mandy Patinkin, and Ruth Gordon; based on Marion's Wall
- Body Snatchers — 1993 remake of Invasion of the Body Snatchers
- The Love Letter — 1998 Dan Curtis TV movie starring Campbell Scott, Jennifer Jason Leigh, David Dukes, and Estelle Parsons; based on the story of the same name
- The Invasion — 2007 remake of Invasion of the Body Snatchers starring Nicole Kidman and Daniel Craig
- Crayon Shin-chan: The Legend Called: Dance! Amigo! — 2006 Shin-Ei Animation film starring Akiko Yajima, Miki Narahashi, Keiji Fujiwara, Akeno Watanabe; based on Yoshito Usui's original manga that was inspired by The Body Snatchers
