= Of Missing Persons =

- Short story by Jack Finney
- Country: United States
- Language: English
- Genre: Science fiction

Publication
- Published in: Good Housekeeping
- Publication type: magazine
- Media type: Print
- Publication date: March 1955

"Of Missing Persons" is a 1955 science fiction short story by American writer Jack Finney, which describes a burned-out bank teller named Charley Ewell living in 1955 New York City who receives a chance to emigrate from Earth to Verna, a lush, earth-like planet light-years away.

== Publication history ==
The story was first published in the March 1955 issue of Good Housekeeping magazine. It was collected in the 1956 anthology SF: The Year's Greatest Science Fiction and Fantasy.

== Plot summary ==
The story is framed as a one-sided conversation between two people, with Charley doing all of the talking. Charley recounts how he had fallen into a similar conversation with another man in a bar years before, and that man had told him to go to Acme Travel Bureau, a small travel agency located on the 200 block of West 42nd Street in New York City, and hint to the proprietor that he would like to "escape" from Earth and its ever-growing list of problems.

Charley seeks out the travel agency and strikes up a conversation with the proprietor, who remains nameless. After taking some time to assess Charley, the proprietor of the travel agency confides that "just as a sort of little joke," he had printed up a travel brochure for a supposedly fictional planet named Verna, whose inhabitants had evolved some time prior to humans, but were physically very similar to humans. As opposed to the warlike ways displayed by humankind through the years, the Vernans had advanced to a peaceful society on an idyllic forested planet.

When the Vernans discovered Earth, they observed it for an unstated period of time, even going so far as to put one of their people on Abraham Lincoln's cabinet. In 1913, just before World War I erupted, they chose to go from passive observation to active intervention, picking a small number of humans over time to invite to Verna. In discussing the Vernans' motivations, the proprietor reasons to Charley, "If you saw a neighbor's house on fire, would you rescue his family if you could? As many as you could, at least?" Over time, the Vernans opened branches of Acme Travel Bureau in every major city and invited people from all over the earth, including Ambrose Bierce and, speculates Charley, Judge Crater.

When Charley asks him, "when does it stop being a joke?", the proprietor tells him, "Now. If you want it to." He gives Charley a bus ticket and asks him for whatever money he has on him — "two five-dollar bills, a one, and seventeen cents in change" — as payment, saying that he wouldn't need it on Verna and that it would help to pay the light bills and rent for Acme Travel. When Charley questions the price, the proprietor says that an identical ticket had sold earlier for $3,700 (equivalent to $43,000 in 2024) and another for $0.06. The proprietor then directs him to Acme Depot, from which a bus will take him to the departure point. He arrives at a small bus station "on one of the narrow streets west of Broadway" occupied by a few other people. They all board a decrepit bus and drive out to rural Long Island, where they are deposited at a dilapidated barn and told to wait for departure to Verna.

As he sits and waits in the dark barn, Charley descends into a rage after he concludes he has been played for a fool. He storms out of the barn, but just as he crosses the threshold, he looks back and briefly glimpses, in a flash of light, the planet Verna through the back window of the barn before the barn door slams shut. By the time he gets the barn door back open, the people he left in the barn are gone, taken to Verna. Returning to the travel agency some time later, Charley is greeted by the proprietor, who hands him his money and says, "You left this on the counter last time you were here. I don't know why."

The story ends with Charley telling his new acquaintance how to find Acme Travel, what to say, and how to act. He then emphasizes to the other person not to back out at the last minute, since no one gets another chance to emigrate to Verna, no matter which branch of Acme Travel they go to, because, in his words, "...I've tried. And tried. And tried."

== Sources ==
- Stealing Through Time—On the Writings of Jack Finney, by Jack Seabrook. ISBN 0-7864-2437-0
