= List of missing people organizations =

This is a list of missing people organizations grouped by international or United States location. A missing person is a person who has disappeared, and whose status as alive or dead is unknown.

== International ==
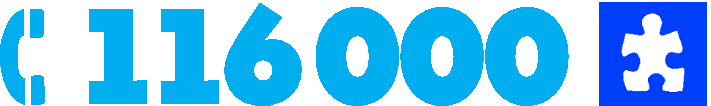
Visual representation created by Missing Children Europe for the 116000 European network of missing children hotlines

- INTERPOL is involved in missing person cases through the maintenance of an International Missing Persons Database. The database is populated by INTERPOL member countries through the use of yellow notices. INTERPOL Notices are international requests for cooperation or alerts allowing police in member countries to share critical crime-related information. In missing person cases a Yellow Notice can be requested by any member country. They are designed to help locate missing persons, often minors, or to help identify persons who are unable to identify themselves. Where a member country requests it, the Yellow Notice is published to the web and can be linked to the INTERPOL suite of border management tools. This will trigger an alert in the event of anyone with a yellow notice crossing a connected border point.
- The International Centre for Missing & Exploited Children works with INTERPOL, law enforcement, and elected officials worldwide to combat child pornography and abduction.
- International Red Cross and Red Crescent Movement through their FamilyLinks website they help track people who are missing after a natural disaster or displaced by war to re-unite with their families.
- The International Commission on Missing Persons (ICMP), a treaty-based international organization with headquarters in The Hague, the Netherlands. Its mandate is to secure the cooperation of governments and others in locating missing persons from conflict, human rights abuses, disasters, organized crime, irregular migration and other causes and to assist them in doing so. It is the only international organization tasked exclusively to work on the issue of missing persons.
- The Doe Network contains both unidentified and missing person cases for several countries throughout the world.

== United States ==
- National Missing and Unidentified Persons System or NamUs is a clearinghouse for missing persons and unidentified decedent records in the United States, a part of the Department of Justice.
- The Doe Network contains both unidentified and missing persons cases.
- The Vanished is a podcast focusing on "stories of the missing from those who knew them best." Its website has a case submission form.
