= Arthur Lyons (writer) =

American fiction writer (1946–2008)

Arthur Lyons (1946-2008) was an American writer. Many of his novels feature Jacob Asch, a reporter turned private detective who solves cases involving the rich and famous. His 1986 novel Castles Burning became the basis for the TV movie Slow Burn. A former member of the Palms Spring City Council, Lyons also authored nonfiction works.

Lyons was born in Los Angeles on January 5, 1946. At age 11, he moved to Palm Springs, California. In 1967, he completed a degree at the UC Santa Barbara. He died in Palm Springs on March 21, 2008, following a stroke.

Palm Springs commemorates Lyons with an annual Arthur Lyons Film Noir Festival.

== Publications ==
=== Non-fiction books ===
- Unnatural Causes, with Thomas Noguchi (1988)
- The Second Coming: Satanism in America (1970)
- Satan Wants You: The Cult of Devil Worship in America (1971)
- The Blue Sense: Psychic Detectives and Crime, with Marcello Truzzi (1991)
- Death on the Cheap: The Lost B Movies of Film Noir (2000)
- Physical Evidence, with Thomas Noguchi

=== Novels ===
- The Dead Are Discreet (1974)
- All God’s Children (1975)
- The Killing Floor (1976)
- Dead Ringer (1977)
- Castles Burning (1979)
- Hard Trade (1981)
- At the Hands of Another (1983)
- Three With a Bullet (1984)
- Fast Fade (1987)
- Other People’s Money (1989)
- False Pretenses (1994)

=== Short stories ===
- “Trouble in Paradise” (1985, The New Black Mask # 1)
- “Missing in Miami” (1986, Mean Streets)
- “Double Your Pleasure” (January 1989, AHMM)
- “Dead Copy” (1988, An Eye For Justice)
- “Twist Of Fate” (January 1990, AHMM)
- “The Tongan Nude” (October 1997, AHMM)
