= From Time to Time (novel) =

1995 novel by Jack Finney

- Author: Jack Finney
- Language: English
- Genre: Science fiction
- Publisher: Simon & Schuster
- Publication date: 1995
- Publication place: United States
- Media type: Hardcover, Audiobook
- Pages: 303
- ISBN: 978-0-671-89884-7
- Preceded by: Time and Again

From Time to Time is a 1995 illustrated novel by American writer Jack Finney, published by Simon & Schuster. The book is the sequel to Finney's 1970 novel, Time and Again, in which Simon Morley, working on a secret government project in 1970, travels back to New York City in 1882. In this sequel, Morley journeys to New York City in 1912 in an attempt to prevent World War I, continuing the series' exploration of time travel, historical causality, and the consequences of individual actions. As in the first novel, From Time to Time makes extensive use of news clippings, period illustrations, and photographs, integrating these materials directly into the narrative to immerse readers in the past.

A further sequel was planned but never completed; Finney died in November 1995, shortly after the publication of From Time to Time.

== Background and development ==
Following the success of Time and Again, Jack Finney continued to explore the mechanisms and implications of his photographic-based method of time travel. He began seriously thinking about the sequel in the late 1980s, studying books on the period but largely relying on primary sources, including newspapers, human-interest stories, and advertisements. He corresponded with the Library of Congress and the New York Public Library for the Performing Arts to obtain photographs and theatre programs to illustrate the novel. His research also included close study of contemporary transportation technology, and the period's popular entertainment, such as vaudeville and early aviation displays. Among Finney's subjects of interest was the early aviator Frank Trenholm Coffyn, who offered plane rides over Manhattan for $5 in 1912; a photograph of Coffyn's plane is included in the novel. (Finney studied maps and visual materials to imagine what Simon Morley would have seen while flying over the city with Coffyn).

Finney spent years refining the sequel's historical framework, concentrating on the political climate of the early 20th century and the diplomatic tensions preceding the First World War. According to a contemporary New York Times Magazine piece, Finney developed a particular interest in the real-life figure of Archibald Butt — military aide to Presidents Theodore Roosevelt and William Howard Taft — whose death aboard the Titanic provided a historically grounded pivot for the novel's central mission to alter the course of international events. The same article suggested that Finney's growing preoccupation with the fragility of historical moments, particularly those linked to the approach of global conflict, influenced the novel's focus on whether individual intervention could avert large-scale catastrophe.

Finney repeatedly abandoned the project — at least five times — due to writer's block, but was ultimately persuaded to return to it and complete the novel by both his literary agent and his family, who encouraged him to finish what would become his final book.

== Plot summary ==
At the end of Time and Again, Morley had prevented the meeting of the parents of the founder of the time travel Project, Dr. Danziger, and ensured that Dr. Danziger would not be born, and that the Project would not occur.

But Major Ruben Prien of the Project still has residual memories of what would have happened. He is able to put the pieces together. He finds another time traveler, John McNaughton, more or less stranded in the present (the 1970s) by Morley's actions. McNaughton is able to go to the point where Morley had altered time and prevent Morley's actions. The original timeline, with the Project, is now back in place.

Morley has settled down in the 1880s, married Julia, and works as a graphic artist. He is, however, vaguely dissatisfied with his life — knowing that he was unable to stop the Project, he eventually returns to the 1970s to see what might be going on with the Project, which has in fact become moribund. Prien soon realizes that Morley is back, and arranges a meeting with him.

Prien persuades Morley that it might be possible to prevent World War I, and Morley travels back in time to the year 1912. Not only does he do it to head off the devastating war, as in the original novel, he has a personal desire to travel in time. His motive to visit the spring of 1912 is to see the brief-lived vaudeville act, "Tessie and Ted", who, we finally learn, are Morley's great aunt and the father who died when Morley was only two years old. He sees them, but forgoes any interaction with them. His primary purpose in visiting 1912 is to find the mysterious "Z", a confidential agent of President Taft whose quiet trip to Europe would have assured peace and prevented the World War, had Z not vanished from the scene, after getting the written assurances he needed, but before returning home. Once Z is found, Morely can do whatever is required to prevent Z from vanishing.

Morley soon is enveloped in the blissful world of 1912 New York, seemingly meeting at every turn Helen Metzner, a woman he calls the "Jotta Girl" (after a mis-remembered popular song title, "Ja-Da," that Morley's aunt would play for him when he was a child.) Morley is able to eavesdrop on a clandestine meeting between Z and Theodore Roosevelt, and finally realizes that Z is Major Archibald Butt (an actual historical character), military aide to both Presidents Roosevelt and Taft, whom Morley has already met in the society of this New York. He tries to get close to Butt, but is frustrated by the Jotta Girl, who Morley belatedly realizes is an agent of Dr. Danziger, original head of the Project and opponent of Prien. Danziger, who opposes changing the past for any purpose, has figured out who Z was, and has sent the Jotta Girl to interfere with Morley. However, Morley does not realize this until Butt is off to Europe on the R.M.S. Mauretania, seemingly ending any chance Morley might have to try to ensure that Butt completes his mission.

His purpose frustrated, Morley returns to report to Prien in the 1970s. It is his intent then to return to Julia in the 1880s, feeling nothing further can be done. Independently of Morley, Prien has learned that Butt was Z, and knows why Z vanished, his mission incomplete. Butt sailed on the Titanic and did not survive. At first, Morley refuses to make another attempt to complete his mission. He is motivated to try again when Prien informs him of the precise date that Morley and Julia's son, Willy, will die in World War I, killed in action.

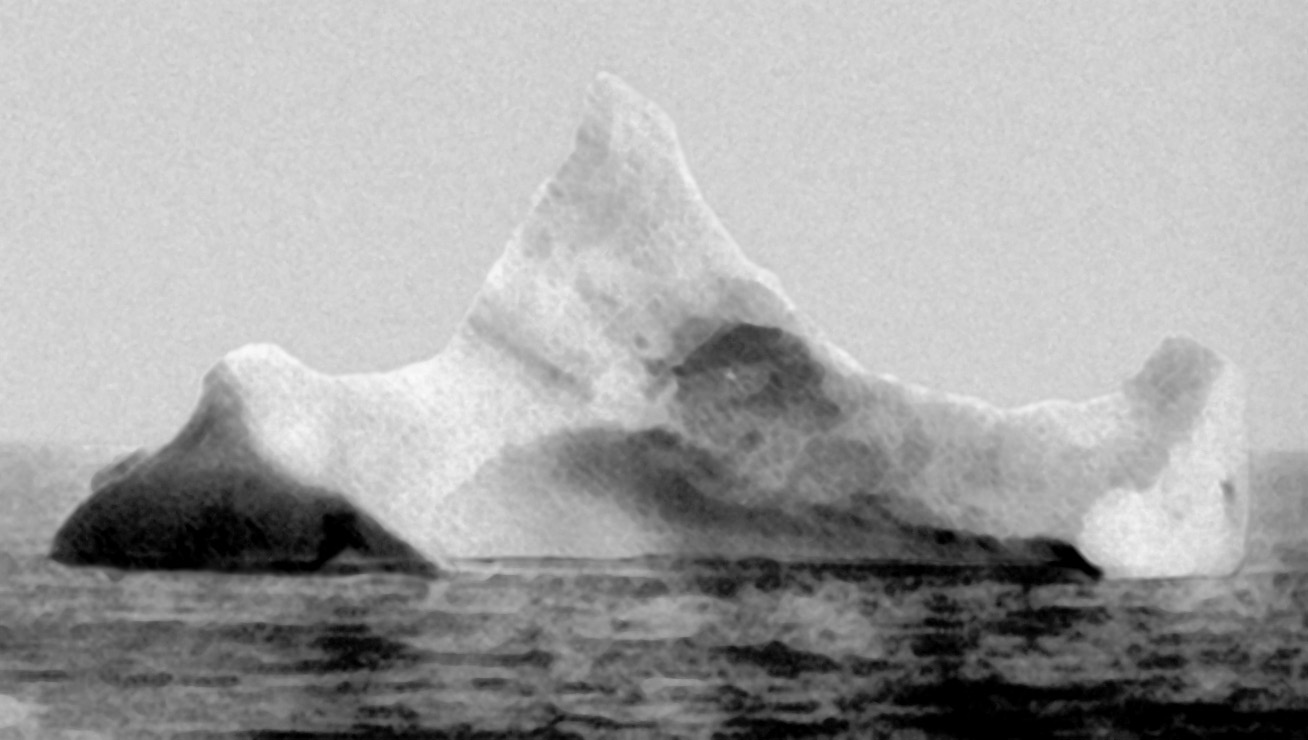
The Titanic iceberg

Morley returns to 1912 and travels to Belfast, where the Titanic is under construction. Seeing no way to sabotage the vessel's construction (which would cause Butt to take another ship), Morley has little choice but to await the ship's completion and sail on her himself, having carefully planned to be near one of the lifeboats where men were permitted to board. Aboard, he meets Butt, who spurns Morley's offer to tell him how to get off the ship safely once the iceberg strikes. Butt will not leave a vessel on which women and children may die (and, according to some accounts, did act in a heroic manner during the sinking). The Jotta Girl is also aboard, and after Captain Smith fails to take Morley's warning seriously, agrees to help Morley. They distract the helmsman, setting the ship onto a new course. That course is the one which impacts the iceberg and sinks the ship. Ironically, had they taken no action, the ship would have missed. Butt's mission fails with his death. The war will happen, and the only hope Morley has for Willy is that forewarned with the information about the day he is to die, that he will survive.

In an epilogue, Morley has returned to 1887, or, by now, 1888. He is emotionally torn up not only by his responsibility for the ship's loss, but also by his attraction to the Jotta Girl, who presumably survived and returned to the 1970s. As the book concludes, he and Julia are laying in supplies for what Morley knows will be the Blizzard of 1888.

== Reception ==
From Time to Time received generally mixed but appreciative reviews, with critics praising Finney's rich historical detail and immersive recreation of early 20th-century New York, while noting that the story and characters often take a secondary role. Publishers Weekly described the novel as "entertaining" and rich in period color, though lacking the "magic and urgency of its predecessor," and highlighted Finney's imaginative set pieces, historical cameos, albeit "creaky" central conceit. The St. Louis Post-Dispatch similarly remarked that, while the book offers abundant period detail, it "seems to stand still at many points" and that this level of detail sometimes gets in the way of the story. In The New York Times, Frank Rich praised the novel's meticulous evocation of New York circa 1912, especially its theatrical life, vaudeville, and Titanic-era settings, while observing that most of the characters — even Simon Morley — function largely as human signposts, guiding readers through the city and its culture rather than becoming fully realized individuals. Similarly, Times critic Michiko Kakutani wrote of the book, "'From Time to Time' doesn't possess the novelty or spontaneous delight of its predecessor -- very few sequels do, of course -- but it still makes for an entertaining romp through a narrow window of history."

In 2024, novelist Jean Hanff Korelitz, author of The Sequel, named From Time to Time as one of her all-time favorite sequel novels, calling it "a brilliant book."

== Audio version ==
In 1995 Simon & Schuster released an audio version of From Time to Time, abridged by James Shokoff. It is read by Campbell Scott and is 4.5 hours in length. (An audio version of Time and Again was released simultaneously. It too was abridged by Shokoff and read by Scott.)
