= List of comics based on fiction =

The following is a list of comics based on fiction, including novels, short stories or plays.

== A ==
Based on	Title	Length	Format	Publication date	Authors	Publisher	Notes	Collected editions
Aelita	Ljubavnica s Marsa (Mistress from Mars)		Serial	November 24, 1935 – February 22, 1936	Andrija Maurović, Krešimir Kovačić		Adaptation of the eponymous 1923 novel by Aleksey Nikolayevich Tolstoy (1935-1936).	
Alex Rider	Stormbreaker: The Graphic Novel	1 volume	Graphic novel	July 3, 2006	Antony Johnston	Walker Books	Adaptation of the first novel.	Trade paperback (1844281116/978-1844281114)
Alex Rider	Point Blanc: The Graphic Novel	1 volume	Graphic novel	September 3, 2007	Antony Johnston	Walker Books	Adaptation of the second novel.	Trade paperback (1844281124/978-1844281121)
Alex Rider	Skeleton Key: The Graphic Novel	1 volume	Graphic novel	September 7, 2009	Antony Johnston	Walker Books	Adaptation of the third novel.	Trade paperback (1406313483/978-1406313482)
Alex Rider	Eagle Strike: The Graphic Novel	1 volume	Graphic novel	June 7, 2012	Antony Johnston	Walker Books	Adaptation of the fourth novel.	Trade paperback (1406318779/978-1406318777)
Alex Rider	Scorpia: The Graphic Novel	1 volume	Graphic novel	February 4, 2016	Antony Johnston	Walker Books	Adaptation of the fifth novel.	Trade paperback (1406341886/978-1406341881)
Alex Rider	Ark Angel: The Graphic Novel	1 volume	Graphic novel	May 1, 2020	Antony Johnston	Walker Books	Adaptation of the sixth novel.	Trade paperback (1406341894/978-1406341898)
Alice	Funny Book #1: "Alice in Wonderland"	1 issue	Comic story	October 16, 1942	?	Parents' Magazine Press	Condensed adaptation of Alice's Adventures in Wonderland (1865), running through a total of 20 pages.	
Alice	Single Series #24: "Alice in Wonderland"	1 issue	One-shot	April 25, 1940	Olive Ray Scott	United Features Syndicate	Condensed adaptation of both Alice's Adventures in Wonderland (1865) and Through the Looking-Glass (1871).	Alice in Comicland HC (1613779135/978-1613779132)
Alice	The Adventures of Alice	3 issues	Limited series	1945 – 1946	Fred Bordes, Serge S. Sabarsky	U. S. Civil Service, Pentagon Publications	Issue 1 titled The Adventures of Alice in Wonderland; Issue 2 titled The Adventures of Alice Through the Magic Looking Glass; Issue 3 titled Alice at Monkey Island.	Alice in Comicland HC (1613779135/978-1613779132)
Alice	Classics Illustrated #49: "Alice in Wonderland"	1 issue	One-shot	July 1948	?	Gilberton Company, Inc.		Alice in Comicland HC (1613779135/978-1613779132)
Alice	World's Greatest Stories #1: "Through the Looking-Glass"	1 issue	One-shot	January 1948	?	Jubilee Publications	Adaptation of the eponymous 1871 novel.	Alice in Comicland HC (1613779135/978-1613779132)
Alice	Alice in Wonderland Meets Santa	1 issue	One-shot	1950	?	Western Publishing	Promotional comic given away at selected retail stores during the 1950 holiday season.	Alice in Comicland HC (1613779135/978-1613779132)
Alice	Alice #10–11	2 issues	Ongoing series	July–August 1951 – September–October 1951	Davy Berg	Ziff Davis		Alice in Comicland HC (1613779135/978-1613779132)
Alice	Mad #18: The Classics Dept. "Alice in Wonderland!"	1 issue	Comic story	December 1954	Harvey Kurtzman	EC Comics	Parody retelling of the novels overall.	Alice in Comicland HC (1613779135/978-1613779132)
Alice	Alice in Wonderland; A Souvenir Tour of Your Wonder Bakery	1 issue	One-shot	1969	?	Promotional Publishing Co.	Main feature story titled "Welcome Back to Wonderland!" (14 pages total); sponsored by the Continental Baking Company, this comic was given away at Wonder Bakery tours.	Alice in Comicland HC (1613779135/978-1613779132)
Alice	Marvel Classics Comics #35: "Alice in Wonderland"	1 issue	One-shot	November 1978	Doug Moench	Marvel Comics		
Alice	New Alice in Wonderland	4 issues	Limited series	February – May 2006	Rod Espinosa	Antarctic Press		
Alice	The Complete Alice in Wonderland	4 issues	Limited series	December 2009 – May 2010	John Reppion, Leah Moore	Dynamite Entertainment		
All Quiet on the Western Front	Classics Illustrated #95	1 issue	One-shot	May 1952	Ken Fitch	Gilberton Company, Inc.		
All Quiet on the Western Front	All Quiet on the Western Front	1 volume	Graphic novel	June 5, 2019	Wayne Vansant	Naval Institute Press	Published under the Dead Reckoning imprint.	
Amtor	Korak, Son of Tarzan #46–50: "Pirates of Venus"	5 issues	Serial storyline	June 1972 – February 1973	Len Wein	DC Comics	Serialized adaptation of the first novel in the series; reprinted as a two-issue limited series by American Mythology Productions from December 2018 to January 2019.	
Amtor	Tarzan/Carson of Venus	4 issues	Limited series	May – August 1998	Darko Macan	Dark Horse Comics	Crossover with Tarzan.	
Amtor	Carson of Venus: Fear on Four Worlds	1 issue	One-shot	August 2018	Christopher Mills	American Mythology Productions	Part one of a four-issue crossover storyline.	
Amtor	Carson of Venus: The Flames Beyond	3 issues	Limited series	January – March 2019	Christopher Paul Carey	American Mythology Productions		
Amtor	Carson of Venus/Warlord of Mars	1 issue	One-shot	June 2019	David Avallone	American Mythology Productions	Crossover with Warlord of Mars.	
Amtor	Carson of Venus: The Eye of Amtor	3 issues	Limited series	February – September 2020	Mike Wolfer, Matt Betts, Christopher Paul Carey	American Mythology Productions		
Amtor	Carson of Venus: Realm of the Dead	3 issues	Limited series	July – August 2020	Mike Wolfer	American Mythology Productions		
Anita Blake: Vampire Hunter	Anita Blake: Vampire Hunter: Guilty Pleasures	12 issues	Ongoing series	December 2006 – August 2008	Stacie M. Richie, Jessica Ruffner	Marvel Comics, Dabel Brothers Productions	Adapted from the 1993 novel of the same title, the first book in the series.	Volume One TPB; Volume Two TPB
Anita Blake: Vampire Hunter	Anita Blake: Vampire Hunter: The First Death	2 issues	Limited series	July – December 2007	Jonathon Green	Marvel Comics, Dabel Brothers Productions		
Anita Blake: Vampire Hunter	Anita Blake: The Laughing Corpse – Book One	5 issues	Limited series	December 2008 – April 2009	Jessica Ruffner	Marvel Comics, Dabel Brothers Productions	Adapted from the 1994 novel of the same title, the second book in the series.	Vol. 1 Animator TPB; Vol. 2 Necromancer TPB; Vol. 3 Executioner TPB
Anita Blake: Vampire Hunter	Anita Blake: The Laughing Corpse — Necromancer	5 issues	Limited series	June 2009 – November 2009	Jessica Ruffner	Marvel Comics	Adapted from the 1994 novel of the same title, the second book in the series.	Vol. 1 Animator TPB; Vol. 2 Necromancer TPB; Vol. 3 Executioner TPB
Anita Blake: Vampire Hunter	Anita Blake: The Laughing Corpse — Executioner	5 issues	Limited series	December 2009 – May 2010	Jessica Ruffner	Marvel Comics	Adapted from the 1994 novel of the same title, the second book in the series.	Vol. 1 Animator TPB; Vol. 2 Necromancer TPB; Vol. 3 Executioner TPB
Anita Blake: Vampire Hunter	Anita Blake: Circus of the Damned — The Charmer	5 issues	Limited series	July 2010 – December 2010	Jessica Ruffner	Marvel Comics	Adapted from the 1995 novel of the same title, the third book in the series.	Vol. 1 The Charmer TPB; Vol. 2 The Ingenue TPB; Vol. 3 The Scoundrel TPB
Anita Blake: Vampire Hunter	Anita Blake: Circus of the Damned — The Ingenue	5 issues	Limited series	March 2011 – October 2011	Jessica Ruffner	Marvel Comics	Adapted from the 1995 novel of the same title, the third book in the series.	Vol. 1 The Charmer TPB; Vol. 2 The Ingenue TPB; Vol. 3 The Scoundrel TPB
Anita Blake: Vampire Hunter	Anita Blake: Circus of the Damned — The Scoundrel	5 issues	Limited series	November 2011 – May 2012	Jessica Ruffner	Marvel Comics	Adapted from the 1995 novel of the same title, the third book in the series.	Vol. 1 The Charmer TPB; Vol. 2 The Ingenue TPB; Vol. 3 The Scoundrel TPB
Anne Rice	Anne Rice's The Mummy, or Ramses the Damned	12 issues	Limited series	October 1990 – February 1992	Faye Perozich	Millennium Publications	Adaptation of the eponymous 1989 novel.	
Anne Rice	Anne Rice's The Witching Hour	4 issues	Limited series	December 1992 – February 1996	Duncan Eagleson, Terry Collins	Millennium Publications	Adaptation of The Witching Hour (1990), the first installment in the Lives of the Mayfair Witches trilogy.	
Anne Rice	Anne Rice's Servant of the Bones	6 issues	Limited series	August 2011 – February 2012	Anne Rice, Mariah McCourt	IDW Publishing	Adaptation of the eponymous 1996 novel.	
"Arena"	Worlds Unknown #4	1 issue	Comic story, one-shot	November 1973	Gerry Conway	Marvel Comics	Adaptation of the eponymous 1944 short story by Fredric Brown.	
Armageddon 2419 A.D.	Buck Rogers in the 25th Century	1 issue	One-shot	October 1964	Paul S. Newman	Gold Key Comics	The main feature story "The Space Slavers" (32 pages total), plus two "Keys of Knowledge" pages "Prehistoric Animals – Number 5: Reptiles of the Sea" and "Wild Animals of North American – Number 27: Mink" in between followed by a pin-up illustration of the book's cover.	No
Around the World in Eighty Days	Classics Illustrated #69	1 issue	One-shot	May 1952	?	Gilberton Company, Inc.		
Around the World in Eighty Days	Now Age Books Illustrated #64-2618	1 volume	Graphic novel	1977	D'Ann Calhoun	Pendulum Press		
Around the World in Eighty Days	Joyas Literarias Juveniles #17: "La vuelta al mundo en ochenta días"	1 issue	One-shot	1971	José Antonio Vidal Sales	Editorial Bruguera		
Around the World in Eighty Days	Romans de toujours #2: "Le tour du monde en quatre-vingts jours"	1 volume	Bande dessinée	2007	Chrys Millien	Glénat Éditions	Published under the Adonis imprint.	
Artemis Fowl	Artemis Fowl: The Graphic Novel	1 volume	Graphic novel	October 2007	Eoin Colfer, Andrew Donkin	Hyperion Books	Adaptation of the first novel.	
Artemis Fowl	Artemis Fowl: The Arctic Incident	1 volume	Graphic novel	October 2009	Eoin Colfer, Andrew Donkin	Hyperion Books	Adaptation of the second novel.	
Artemis Fowl	Artemis Fowl: The Eternity Code	1 volume	Graphic novel	July 2013	Eoin Colfer, Andrew Donkin	Hyperion Books	Adaptation of the third novel.	
Artemis Fowl	Artemis Fowl: The Opal Deception	1 volume	Graphic novel	July 2014	Eoin Colfer, Andrew Donkin	Hyperion Books	Adaptation of the fourth novel.	

== B ==
Basis	Title	Length	Format	Publication date	Authors	Publisher	Notes	Collected editions
Barsoom	The Funnies #30–56: "John Carter of Mars" (1939)	27 issues	Serial	April 1939 – June 1941	John Coleman Burroughs	Dell Comics		
Barsoom	Four Color (series 2) #375, 437, 488: "John Carter of Mars" (1952)	3 issues	One-shot	February 1952, November 1952, August 1953	Paul S. Newman, Phil Evans	Dell Comics	The first story, "The Prisoner of the Tharks" (#375), was adapted from A Princess of Mars (1912); The latter two stories, "The Black Pirates of Omean" (#437) and "Tyrant of the North" (#488), were adapted from The Gods of Mars (1913).	
Barsoom	Tarzan #207–209; Weird Worlds #1–2: "A Princess of Mars"	5 issues	Serial	April – June 1972, September – November 1972	Marv Wolfman	DC Comics	Adaptation of the first novel.	No
Barsoom	Weird Worlds #2–7: "The Gods of Mars"	6 issues	Serial	November 1972 – March 1973	Marv Wolfman	DC Comics	Adaptation of the second novel; chapter titles for each installment: "Escape" (11 pages), "Into the Valley of Death" (12 pages), "Thuvia" (12 pages), "Deathknell" (12 pages), "Beneath the Omean Sea" (10 pages) and "Reunion!" (9 pages).	No
Barsoom	Tarzan Family #60: "Amazon of Barsoom"	1 issue	Comic story	November–December 1975	Robert Kanigher	DC Comics		
Barsoom	Tarzan Family #62: "The Girl in the Emerald"	1 issue	Comic story	March–April 1976	Robert Kanigher	DC Comics		
Barsoom	Tarzan Family #63: "Death Has Three Heads"	1 issue	Comic story	May–June 1976	Robert Kanigher	DC Comics		
Barsoom	Tarzan Family #64: "Lights of Doom"	1 issue	Comic story	July–August 1976	Robert Kanigher	DC Comics		
Barsoom	John Carter, Warlord of Mars (1977)	28 issues	Ongoing series	June 1977 – October 1979	Marv Wolfman, Chris Claremont, Peter Gillis	Marvel Comics	The complete series is set midway through chapter 27 "From Joy to Death".	
Barsoom	Tarzan/John Carter: Warlords of Mars	4 issues	Limited series	January – June 1996	Bruce Jones	Dark Horse Comics	First comic book crossover with Tarzan.	
Barsoom	Warlord of Mars	100 issues and an issue 0	Ongoing series	Arvid Nelson, Robert Place Napton, Matt Brady	October 2010 – July 2014	Dynamite Entertainment		
Barsoom	Warlord of Mars: Dejah Thoris	37 issues	Ongoing series	Arvid Nelson, Robert Place Napton	March 2011 – March 2014	Dynamite Entertainment		
Barsoom	Warlord of Mars: Fall of Barsoom	5 issues	Limited series	Robert Place Napton	July 2011 – January 2012	Dynamite Entertainment		
Barsoom	John Carter: A Princess of Mars	5 issues	Limited series	November 2011 – March 2012	Roger Langridge	Marvel Comics		
Barsoom	Warriors of Mars	5 issues	Limited series	January – October 2012	Robert Place Napton	Dynamite Entertainment	Crossover with Lieut. Gullivar Jones: His Vacation.	
Barsoom	Dejah Thoris and the White Apes of Mars	4 issues	Limited series	April – July 2012	Mark Rahner	Dynamite Entertainment		
Barsoom	John Carter: The Gods of Mars	5 issues	Limited series	May – September 2012	Sam Humphries	Marvel Comics		
Barsoom	Dejah Thoris and the Green Men of Mars	12 issues	Limited series	February 2013 – March 2014	Mark Rahner	Dynamite Entertainment		
Barsoom	Lords of Mars	6 issues	Limited series	August 2013 – January 2014	Arvid Nelson	Dynamite Entertainment	Second comic book crossover with Tarzan.	
Barsoom	Dejah of Mars	4 issues	Limited series	May – September 2014	Mark Rahner	Dynamite Entertainment		
Barsoom	John Carter, Warlord of Mars (2014)	14 issues	Limited series	November 2014 – 2015	Ron Marz, Ian Edginton	Dynamite Entertainment		
Barsoom	Dejah Thoris (series 1)	6 issues	Limited series	2016	Frank J. Barbiere	Dynamite Entertainment		
Barsoom	John Carter: The End	5 issues	Limited series	2017	Brian Wood, Alex Cox	Dynamite Entertainment		
Barsoom	Dejah Thoris (series 2)	10 issues and an issue 0	Limited series	January – November 2018	Amy Chu	Dynamite Entertainment		
Barsoom	Vampirella/Dejah Thoris	5 issues	Limited series	September 2018 – February 2019	Erik Burnham	Dynamite Entertainment	Crossover with Vampirella.	
Barsoom	Barbarella/Dejah Thoris	4 issues	Limited series	January – June 2019	Leah Williams	Dynamite Entertainment	Crossover with Barbarella.	
Barsoom	Warlord of Mars Attacks	5 issues	Limited series	June – October 2019	Jeff Parker	Dynamite Entertainment	Crossover with Mars Attacks.	
Barsoom	Dejah Thoris (series 3)	12 issues	Limited series	December 2019 – April 2021	Dan Abnett	Dynamite Entertainment		
Barsoom	Dejah Thoris: Winter's End	1 issue	One-shot	April 2021	Dan Abnett	Dynamite Entertainment		
Barsoom	Dejah Thoris versus John Carter of Mars	6 issues	Limited series	July 2021 – January 2022	Dan Abnett	Dynamite Entertainment		
Barsoom	John Carter of Mars (2022)	5 issues	Limited series	April – August 2022	Chuck Brown	Dynamite Entertainment		
Barsoom	Dejah Thoris: Fairy Tales	1 issue	One-shot	August 2022	Ron Marz	Dynamite Entertainment		
Barsoom	Dejah Thoris (series 4)	6 issues	Limited series	March – July 2023	Chuck Brown	Dynamite Entertainment		
Batman	Batman: The Ultimate Evil	2 issues	Limited series	November – December 1995	Neal Barrett, Jr.	DC Comics	Adaptation of the eponymous 1995 novel by Andrew Vachss.	
Battle Royale	Battle Royale (バトル・ロワイアル)	119 chapters	Serialized manga	2000 – 2005	Koushun Takami	Akita Shoten	Serialized in Young Champion.	Collected in 15 tankōbon volumes
Battle Royale	Battle Royale II: Blitz Royale (BRII ブリッツ ロワイアル)	2 volumes	Manga	December 21, 2003 – May 27, 2004	Hitoshi Tomizawa	Akita Shoten	Serialized in Young Champion.	
Belphégor	Main article: Belphégor (novel) § Adaptations							
Ben-Hur: A Tale of the Christ	Classics Illustrated #147	1 issue	One-shot	Betty Jacobson	November 1958	Gilberton Company, Inc.		
Biggles	Main article: Biggles § Comics							
Billy Bunter	"Billy Bunter", Knockout #1–12??		Serial	?	4 March 1939 – 16 February 1963	Amalgamated Press (1939–1959), Fleetway Publications (1959–1963)		
The Black Arrow: A Tale of the Two Roses	Classic Comics #31	1 issue	One-shot	October 1946	Tom Scott and Ruth Roche	Gilberton Company, Inc.		
Black Beauty	Funny Book #5: "Black Beauty" (1943)	1 issue	Main feature story	Autumn 1943	?	The Parents' Magazine Press Division of The Parents' Institute Inc.		No
Black Beauty	Classics Illustrated #60: "Black Beauty" (1949)	1 issue	One-shot	June 1949	?	Gilberton Company, Inc.		No
Black Beauty	Four Color (series 2) #440: "Black Beauty" (1952)	3 issues	One-shot	December 1952	?	Dell Comics		No
Black Beauty	Four Color (series 2) #510, 566: "Son of Black Beauty"	3 issues	One-shot	November 1953, June 1954	Paul S. Newman	Dell Comics		No
Black Beauty	Now Age Books Illustrated #64-1005: "Black Beauty"	1 volume	Graphic novel	January 1973	Naunerle Farr	Pendulum Press		Paperback: ISBN 0-88301-094-1
Black Beauty	Anna Sewell's Black Beauty: The Graphic Novel	1 volume	Graphic novel	May 2005	June Brigman, Roy Richardson	Puffin Books		Paperback: ISBN 0-14-240408-X
"Black Destroyer"	Worlds Unknown #5	1 issue	Comic story	February 1974	Roy Thomas	Marvel Comics	Adaptation of the eponymous 1939 short story by A. E. van Vogt.	
The Black Tulip	Classics Illustrated #73	1 issue	One-shot	July 1950	Ken Fitch	Gilberton Company, Inc.		
Bob Morane	Main article: Bob Morane (comics)							
Books of Blood	Tapping the Vein	5 issues	Limited series	Clive Barker (original stories), Chuck Wagner (#2, 3), Steve Niles (#5), Fred Burke (#2, 3, 4, 5), Bo Hampton (#2)	1989 – 1990	Eclipse Comics	Anthology series adapted from selected short stories from the eponymous 1984–1985 six-volume series, with two stories per one issue published; "Book One" adapted "Human Remains" (from Volume 3) and "Pig Blood Blues" (from Volume 1), "Book Two" adapted "The Skins of the Fathers" (from Volume 2) and "In the Hills, the Cities" (from Volume 1), "Book Three" adapted "The Midnight Meat Train" (from Volume 1) and "Scape-Goats" (from Volume 3), "Book Four" adapted "Hell's Event" (from Volume 2) and "The Madonna" (from Volume 5) and "Book Five" adapted "How Spoilers Bleed" (from Volume 6) and "Down, Satan!" (from Volume 4).	
Books of Blood	The Yattering and Jack	1 volume	Graphic novel	Steve Niles	January 1991	Eclipse Comics	Adaptation of the eponymous short story from Volume 1.	
Books of Blood	Revelations	1 volume	Graphic novel	Steve Niles	August 1991	Eclipse Comics	Adaptation of the eponymous short story from Volume 4.	
Books of Blood	Son of Celluloid	1 volume	Graphic novel	Steve Niles	May 1991	Eclipse Comics	Adaptation of the eponymous short story from Volume 3.	
Books of Blood	Dread	1 volume	Graphic novel	Fred Burke	1992	Eclipse Comics	Adaptation of the eponymous short story from Volume 2.	
Books of Blood	The Life of Death	1 volume	Graphic novel	Steve Niles, Fred Burke	December 1993	Eclipse Comics	Adaptation of the eponymous short story from Volume 6.	
Books of Blood	Rawhead Rex	1 volume	Graphic novel	Steve Niles	1994	Eclipse Comics	Adaptation of the eponymous short story from Volume 3 and "Twilight at the Towers" from Volume 6.	
"The Bottle Imp"	Classics Illustrated #116	1 issue	One-shot	February 1954	?	Gilberton Company, Inc.	Adaptation of the eponymous 1891 short story by Robert Louis Stevenson, followed by a back-up adaptation of another Stevenson story "The Beach of Falesá" (1892).	
The Bounty Trilogy	Classics Illustrated #100: "Mutiny on the Bounty"	3 issues	One-shot	Ken Fitch	October 1952	Gilberton Company, Inc.	Adaptation of the first novel.	No
The Bounty Trilogy	Classics Illustrated #103: "Men Against the Sea"	3 issues	One-shot	Ken Fitch	January 1953	Gilberton Company, Inc.	Adaptation of the second novel.	No
The Bounty Trilogy	Classics Illustrated #109: "Pitcairn's Island"	3 issues	One-shot	Ken Fitch	July 1953	Gilberton Company, Inc.	Adaptation of the third novel.	No
Buying Time	Dallas Barr		Bande dessinée	1996 – 2005	Joe Haldeman	Dupuis (1996–2000), Le Lombard (2005)		
By Bizarre Hands	By Bizarre Hands (1994)	3 issues	Ongoing series	April – June 1994	Neal Barrett Jr., Jerry Prosser	Dark Horse Comics		No
By Bizarre Hands	By Bizarre Hands (2004)	6 issues	Ongoing series	April – December 2004	Dheeraj Verma, Armando Rossi, Andres Guinaldo	Avatar Press		No

== C ==
Basis	Title	Length	Format	Publication date	Authors	Publisher	Notes	Collected editions
The Call of the Wild	Classics Illustrated #91	1 issue	Main feature	January 1952	Jack London (novel), Ken Fitch (adaptation)	Gilberton Company, Inc.	Forty-four pages total; art by Maurice Del Bourgo.	No
The Call of the Wild	Now Age Books Illustrated #64-1010	1 volume	Graphic novel	1973	Jack London (novel), Kin Platt (adaptation)	Pendulum Press	Fifty-six pages total; art by Fred Carrillo.	No
The Call of the Wild	Joyas Literarias Juveniles #246: "La llamada de la selva"	1 issue	Main feature	1982	Jack London (novel), Arturo Marcelo (adaptation)	Editorial Bruguera, S.A.	Thirty pages total; art by José García Pizarro.	No
The Call of the Wild	Classics Illustrated #10	1 issue	Main feature	June 1990	Jack London (novel), Chuck Dixon (adaptation)	Berkley Books, First Publishing	Forty-five pages total; art by Ricardo Villagrán.	No
The Call of the Wild	Jack London's The Call of the Wild: The Graphic Novel	1 volume	Graphic novel	2006	Jack London (novel), Neil Kleid (adaptation)	Puffin Books	176 pages total; art by Alex Niño.	No
"The Canterville Ghost"	Classics Illustrated #150	1 issue	Main feature	1962	Oscar Wilde (short stort), Alfred Sundel (adaptation)	Thorpe & Porter	Thirty-one pages total; art by Mick Anglo.	No
"The Canterville Ghost"	Graphic Classics #16: "Oscar Wilde"	1 issue	Main feature	2009	Oscar Wilde (short story), Antonella Caputo (adaptation)	Eureka Productions	Thirty pages total; art by Nick Miller.	No
Captains Courageous	Classics Illustrated #117	1 issue	Main feature	March 1954	Ira Zweifach	Gilberton Company, Inc.		No
Carmilla	Carmilla	6 issues	Limited series	February – July 1991	Steven Jones, John Ross	Aircel Comics	Adaptation of the eponymous 1872 novella by Sheridan Le Fanu.	No
Castle Dangerous	Classics Illustrated #141	1 issue	Main feature	November 1957	?	Gilberton Company, Inc.		
Caspak	The Land That Time Forgot (2010)	1 issue	Graphic novel	April 2010	Scott Alexander Young	Campfire		
Caspak	The Land That Time Forgot (2016)	3 issues	Limited series	July – November 2016	Mike Wolfer	American Mythology Productions		
Caspak	The Land That Time Forgot: Terror from the Earth's Core	3 issues	Limited series	October – December 2007	Mike Wolfer	American Mythology Productions	Crossover with Pellucidar.	
Caspak	The Land That Time Forgot: See-Ta the Savage	2 issues	Limited series	March – May 2018	Mike Wolfer	American Mythology Productions		
Caspak	The Land That Time Forgot: Fear on Four Worlds #1	1 issue	One-shot	December 2018	Mike Wolfer	American Mythology Productions	Part four of a four-issue crossover storyline.	
Caspak	Zorro in the Land that Time Forgot	4 issues	Limited series	October 2020 – April 2021	Mike Wolfer	American Mythology Productions	Crossover with Zorro.	
Caspak	The Land That Time Forgot: Fearless	3 issues	Limited series	November 2020 – April 2021	Mike Wolfer	American Mythology Productions		
A Christmas Carol	Santa Claus Funnies #1	1 issue	Main feature	December 1942	Charles Dickens (novella)	Dell Comics	Fifteen pages total; art by George Kerr.	
A Christmas Carol	Treasure Chest (volume 2) #9	1 issue	Main feature	December 24, 1946	Charles Dickens (novella)	Geo. A. Pflaum, Publisher Inc.	Ten pages total; art by Matthew O'Brien.	
A Christmas Carol	Classics Illustrated #58	1 issue	Main feature	November 1948	Charles Dickens (novella), George Lipscomb (adaptation)	Gilberton Company, Inc.	Forty-five pages total; art by Henry Kiefer.	No
A Christmas Carol	A Christmas Treasury #1	1 issue	Main feature	1954	Charles Dickens (novella)	Dell Comics	Ten pages total; art by Mike Sekowsky.	
A Christmas Carol	Thriller Comics Library #109	1 issue	Main feature	December 1955	Charles Dickens (novella)	Geo. A. Pflaum, Publisher Inc.	Sixty-four pages total; art by H. M. Brock.	
A Christmas Carol	Humbug #6	1 issue	Main feature	January 1958	Charles Dickens (novella)	Humbug Publishing Co. Inc.	Six pages total; art by Arnold Roth.	
A Christmas Carol	Holi-Day Surprise #55	1 issue	Main feature	March 1967	Charles Dickens (novella), Joe Gill (adaptation)	Charlton Comics	Twenty pages total; art by Bill Fraccio and Tony Tallarico.	
A Christmas Carol	Joyas Literarias Juveniles #90: "Cuento de Navidad"	1 issue	Main feature	1973	Charles Dickens (novel), Manuel Yáñez (adaptation)	Editorial Bruguera, S.A.	Thirty pages total; art and colors by Tomás Porto.	No
A Christmas Carol	I classici per ragazzi a fumetti: Il canto di Natale	1 volume	Graphic novel	December 1978	Charles Dickens (novella), Carlos A. Cornejo (adaptation)	Bonechi Editore	Forty-eight pages total; art by Chiqui de la Fuente.	
A Christmas Carol	Marvel Classics Comics #36	1 issue	Main feature	1978	Charles Dickens (novella), Doug Moench (adaptation)	Marvel Comics	Forty-eight pages total; art by Diverse Hands.	No
A Christmas Carol	Now Age Books Illustrated #64-3134	1 volume	Graphic novel	1978	Charles Dickens (novel), Tom Fagan (adaptation)	Pendulum Press	Fifty-six pages total; art by June Lofamia.	No
A Christmas Carol	Classics Illustrated #16	1 issue	Main feature	December 1990	Charles Dickens (novel), Joe Staton (adaptation)	Berkley Books, First Publishing	Forty-five pages total; art by Joe Staton with colors by Les Dorscheid.	No
A Christmas Carol	A Christmas Carol (2009)	1 volume	Graphic novel	October 2009	Charles Dickens (novella), Patrice Buendia (adaptation)	IDW Publishing	Forty-six pages total; art by Jean-Marc Stalner with colors by Caroline Romanet.	No
A Christmas Carol	Zombies Christmas Carol	5 issues	Limited series	June – October 2011	Jim McCann	Marvel Comics	Set in the Marvel Zombies universe.	
The Cisco Kid	Cisco Kid Comics	#1		Winter 1944	Walter Gardener	Baily Publishing		No
The Cisco Kid	The Cisco Kid (1941) #2–41	40 issues	Ongoing series	January 1951 – October–December 1958		Dell Comics		No
The Cisco Kid	The Cisco Kid (2004)	3 issues	Limited series	February – July 2004	Jim Duffy	Moonstone Books		No
The Cisco Kid	The Cisco Kid: Gunfire & Brimstone	3 issues	Limited series	2005	Len Kody	Moonstone Books		No
The Cisco Kid	The Cisco Kid vs. Wyatt Earp	1 issue	One-shot	September 2008	Len Kody	Moonstone Books		No
The Cisco Kid	Wyatt Earp vs. the Cisco Kid	1 issue	One-shot	September 2008	Chuck Dixon	Moonstone Books		No
Cleopatra	Classics Illustrated #161	1 issue	Main feature	March 1961	Alfred Sundel	Gilberton Company, Inc.		No
The Cloister and the Hearth	Classics Illustrated #66	1 issue	Main feature	December 1949	Leslie Katz	Gilberton Company, Inc.		No
Clouds Over the Chupaderos	Four Color (series 2) #324: "I Met a Handsome Cowboy"	1 issue	One-shot	March 1951	?	Dell Comics	Adaptation of the serialized 1943 novel by Elsa Barker, first published in the magazine Range Romances.	No
Conan the Barbarian	Main article: Conan (comics)							
A Connecticut Yankee in King Arthur's Court	Classic Comics #24	1 issue	Main feature	September 1945	Ruth Roche, Tom Scott	Gilberton Company, Inc.		No
The Conspirators	Classics Illustrated #158	1 issue	Main feature	September 1960	Alfred Sundel	Gilberton Company, Inc.		No
The Corsican Brothers	Classic Comics #20	1 issue	Main feature	June 1944	Stephen Burrows	Gilberton Company, Inc.		No
The Count of Monte Cristo	Classic Comics #3	1 issue	Main feature	March 1942	?	Gilberton Company, Inc.		No
The Covered Wagon	Classics Illustrated #131	1 issue	Main feature	March 1956	Annette T. Rubenstein	Gilberton Company, Inc.		No
Crime and Punishment	Classics Illustrated #89	1 issue	Main feature	November 1951	?	Gilberton Company, Inc.		No
The Crisis	Classics Illustrated #145	1 issue	Main feature	July 1958	?	Gilberton Company, Inc.		No
Crouching Tiger, Hidden Dragon	Crouching Tiger, Hidden Dragon	12 volumes	Manhua	2002 – 2005	Andy Seto	HK Comics Limited (Hong Kong)		

== D ==
Basis	Title	Length	Format	Publication date	Authors	Publisher	Notes	Collected editions
The Dark Tower (comics)	The Dark Tower: The Gunslinger Born	7 issues	Limited series	April – October 2007	Robin Firth, Peter David	Marvel Comics		
The Dark Tower (comics)	The Dark Tower: The Long Road Home	5 issues	Limited series	May—September 2008	Robin Firth, Peter David	Marvel Comics		
The Dark Tower (comics)	The Dark Tower: Treachery	6 issues	Limited series	November 2008 – April 2009	Robin Firth, Peter David	Marvel Comics		
The Dark Tower (comics)	The Dark Tower: The Sorcerer	1 issue	One-shot	Robin Furth	June 2009	Marvel Comics		
The Dark Tower (comics)	The Dark Tower: Fall of Gilead	6 issues	Limited series	July 2009 – January 2010	Robin Firth, Peter David	Marvel Comics		
The Dark Tower (comics)	The Dark Tower: Battle of Jericho Hill	6 issues	Limited series	February – June 2010	Robin Firth, Peter David	Marvel Comics		
The Dark Tower (comics)	The Dark Tower: The Gunslinger - The Journey Begins	5 issues	Limited series	July – November 2010	Robin Firth, Peter David	Marvel Comics	Adaptations of The Gunslinger (1982), the first installment in the series.	
The Dark Tower (comics)	The Dark Tower: The Gunslinger - The Little Sisters of Eluria	5 issues	Limited series	February – June 2011	Robin Firth, Peter David	Marvel Comics	Adaptations of The Gunslinger (1982), the first installment in the series.	
The Dark Tower (comics)	The Dark Tower: The Gunslinger - The Battle of Tull	5 issues	Limited series	August – December 2011	Robin Firth, Peter David	Marvel Comics	Adaptations of The Gunslinger (1982), the first installment in the series.	
The Dark Tower (comics)	The Dark Tower: The Gunslinger - The Way Station	5 issues	Limited series	February – June 2012	Robin Firth, Peter David	Marvel Comics	Adaptations of The Gunslinger (1982), the first installment in the series.	
The Dark Tower (comics)	The Dark Tower: The Gunslinger - The Man in Black	5 issues	Limited series	August – December 2012	Robin Firth, Peter David	Marvel Comics	Adaptations of The Gunslinger (1982), the first installment in the series.	
The Dark Tower (comics)	The Dark Tower: The Gunslinger - Sheemie's Tale	2 issues	Limited series	March – April 2013	Robin Firth	Marvel Comics	Adaptations of The Gunslinger (1982), the first installment in the series.	
The Dark Tower (comics)	The Dark Tower: The Gunslinger - Evil Ground	2 issues	Limited series	June – August 2013	Robin Firth, Peter David	Marvel Comics	Adaptations of The Gunslinger (1982), the first installment in the series.	
The Dark Tower (comics)	The Dark Tower: The Gunslinger - So Fell Lord Perth	1 issue	One-shot	September 2013	Robin Firth, Peter David	Marvel Comics	Adaptations of The Gunslinger (1982), the first installment in the series.	
The Dark Tower (comics)	The Dark Tower: The Drawing of the Three - The Prisoner	5 issues	Limited series	November 2014 – February 2015	Robin Firth, Peter David	Marvel Comics	Adaptations of The Drawing of the Three (1987), the second installment in the series.	
The Dark Tower (comics)	The Dark Tower: The Drawing of the Three - House of Cards	5 issues	Limited series	May – September 2015	Robin Firth, Peter David	Marvel Comics	Adaptations of The Drawing of the Three (1987), the second installment in the series.	
The Dark Tower (comics)	The Dark Tower: The Drawing of the Three - Lady of Shadows	5 issues	Limited series	November 2015 – March 2016	Robin Firth, Peter David	Marvel Comics	Adaptations of The Drawing of the Three (1987), the second installment in the series.	
The Dark Tower (comics)	The Dark Tower: The Drawing of the Three - Bitter Medicine	5 issues	Limited series	June – October 2016	Robin Firth, Peter David	Marvel Comics	Adaptations of The Drawing of the Three (1987), the second installment in the series.	
The Dark Tower (comics)	The Dark Tower: The Drawing of the Three - The Sailor	5 issues	Limited series	December 2016 – April 2017	Robin Firth, Peter David	Marvel Comics	Adaptations of The Drawing of the Three (1987), the second installment in the series.	
"Dig Me No Grave"	Journey into Mystery (1972) #1	1 issue	Main feature	October 1972	Robert E. Howard (short story), Roy Thomas (adaptation)	Marvel Comics	Eight pages total; art by Gil Kane and Tom Palmer with colors by Palmer.	No
Dirk Gently's Holistic Detective Agency	Dirk Gently's Holistic Detective Agency	5 issues	Limited series	May – October 2015	Chris Ryall	IDW Publishing		
Dirk Gently's Holistic Detective Agency	Dirk Gently's Holistic Detective Agency: A Spoon Too Short	5 issues	Limited series	February – June 2016	Arvind Ethan David	IDW Publishing		
Dirk Gently's Holistic Detective Agency	Dirk Gently's Holistic Detective Agency: The Salmon of Doubt	9 issues	Limited series	October 2016 – June 2017	Arvind Ethan David	IDW Publishing		
Discworld	The Colour of Magic	4 issues	Limited series	1991	Scott Rockwell	Innovation Publishing	Adaptation of the first novel.	
Discworld	The Light Fantastic	4 issues	Limited series	June 1992 – February 1993		Innovation Publishing	Adaptation of the second novel.	
Discworld	Mort: A Discworld Big Comic	1 issues	Graphic novel	December 1994	Terry Pratchett	VG Graphics	Adaptation of the fourth novel.	
Dixie Dugan	Dixie Dugan (volume 1)	13 issues		July 1942 – 1949	J. P. McEvoy	McNaught Syndicate	Based on the character from a trilogy of novels by McEvoy, which consisted of Show Girl (1928), Hollywood Girl (1929) and Society (1931).	
Dixie Dugan	Dixie Dugan (volume 2)	4 issues		February – November 1952	J. P. McEvoy	Headline Publications	Based on the character from a trilogy of novels by McEvoy, which consisted of Show Girl (1928), Hollywood Girl (1929) and Society (1931).	
Dixie Dugan	Dixie Dugan (volume 3)	4 issues		February 1953 – February 1954	J. P. McEvoy	Headline Publications	Based on the character from a trilogy of novels by McEvoy, which consisted of Show Girl (1928), Hollywood Girl (1929) and Society (1931).	
Do Androids Dream of Electric Sheep?	Do Androids Dream of Electric Sheep?	24 issues	Limited series	June 2009 – May 2011	Philip K. Dick	Boom! Studios		
Do Androids Dream of Electric Sheep?	Do Androids Dream of Electric Sheep?: Dust to Dust	8 issues	Limited series	May – December 2010	Chris Roberson	Boom! Studios		
Doc Savage	Doc Savage (1966)	1 issue	One-shot	November 1966		Gold Key Comics		No
Doc Savage	Doc Savage: The Man of Bronze (1972)	8 issues	Ongoing series	October 1972 – January 1974		Marvel Comics		
Doc Savage	Doc Savage: Devil's Thoughts (1991)	3 issues	Limited series	August – October 1991		Millennium Publications		No
Doc Savage	Doc Savage: The Man of Bronze (1991)	4 issues	Limited series	November 1991 – May 1992		Millennium Publications		No
Doc Savage	Doc Savage: Doom Dynasty	2 issues	Limited series	May – July 1991		Millennium Publications		No
Doc Savage	Doc Savage: Repel	1 issue (planned)	Limited series	January 1993		Millennium Publications		No
Doc Savage	The Shadow and Doc Savage	2 issues	Limited series	July – August 1995	Steve Vance	Dark Horse Comics	Crossover with The Shadow.	
Doc Savage	Doc Savage: Curse of the Fire God	4 issues	Limited series	September – November 1995		Dark Horse Comics		
Doc Savage	Doc Savage: The Man of Bronze (2013)	8 issues	Limited series	December 2013 – July 2014		Dynamite Entertainment		
Doc Savage	Doc Savage: The Man of Bronze Annual	1 issue	One-shot	May 2014		Dynamite Entertainment		
Doc Savage	Doc Savage Special: Woman of Bronze	1 issue	One-shot	December 2014		Dynamite Entertainment		
Doc Savage	Doc Savage: The Spider's Web	5 issues	Limited series	2015 – 2016	David Avallone	Dynamite Entertainment		
Doc Savage	Doc Savage: The Ring of Fire	4 issues	Limited series	March – July 2017	Chris Roberson	Dynamite Entertainment		
Dracula (comics)	Dracula (1966)	1 volume	Graphic novel	January 1966	Bram Stoker (novel), Otto Binder (adaptation), Craig Tennis (adaptation)	Ballantine Books		
Dracula (comics)	Now Age Books Illustrated #64-100X	1 volume	Graphic novel	May 1973	Bram Stoker (novel), Naunerle Farr (adaptation)	Pendulum Press		
Dracula (comics)	Dracula Lives! #5–8, 10–11, The Legion of Monsters (1975) #1	12 issues	Main feature, serial	March 1974 – March 1975, September 1975	Bram Stoker (novel), Roy Thomas (adaptation)	Marvel Comics	The first third of Roy Thomas' serialised adaptation of the eponymous 1897 novel, the artwork was drawn by Dick Giordano.	
Dracula (comics)	Blood of Dracula	19 issues	Limited series	November 1987 – November 1990	Rickey L. Shanklin (#1–19), Mark Wheatley (#1, 4, 5, 6, 10), John Workman (#2), Martin Rybicki (#8, 9), Richard Braswell (#10), Lenny Giteck (#11)	Apple Press	Anthology comic, consisting of three recurring features: Count Dracula, Death Dreams of Dracula and Dracula 2199 respectively.	
Dracula (comics)	Dracula (1989)	4 issues	Limited series	December 1989 – March 1990	Bram Stoker (novel), Steve Jones (adaptation)	Eternity Comics		
Dracula (comics)	Dracula: The Lady in the Tomb	1 issue	One-shot	January 1991	Bram Stoker (novel), Steve Jones (adaptation)	Eternity Comics	Technically adapted from the related 1914 short story "Dracula's Guest", the issue also includes the original text as a bonus two-page feature.	
Dracula (comics)	Big Bad Blood of Dracula	2 issues	Limited series	July – September 1991	Mike McCarthy (signed as JMM)	Apple Press		
Dracula (comics)	Ghosts of Dracula	5 issues	Limited series	September 1991 – January 1992	Martin Powell	Eternity Comics		
Dracula (comics)	Dracula in Hell	2 issues	Limited series	January – March 1992	Richard Adamson	Apple Press		
Dracula (comics)	Dracula: The Suicide Club	4 issues	Limited series	August – November 1992	Steve Jones	Adventure Publications		
Dracula (comics)	Dracula: Return of the Impaler	4 issues	Limited series	July 1993 – May 1994	Dan Vado	Slave Labor Graphics		No
Dracula (comics)	Dracula versus Zorro	2 issues	Limited series	October – November 1993	Don McGregor	Topps Comics	Crossover with Zorro; reprinted by Image Comics from September to October 1998.	
Dracula (comics)	The Collector's Dracula	2 issues	Limited series	March – June 1994	J. Harker	Millennium Publications	Anthology series freely featuring Dracula; the main feature story, concerning a group of travelers touring Dracula's castle and are narrated several vampire tales by the host, is the framing device for the other stories which are interspersed throughout this two-issue series.	
Dracula (comics)	The Curse of Dracula	3 issues	Limited series	July – September 1998	Marv Wolfman	Dark Horse Comics		
Dracula (comics)	Sword of Dracula	6 issues	Limited series	October 2003 – September 2004	Jason Henderson	Image Comics		
Dracula (comics)	Dracula's Revenge	2 issues	Limited series	April – May 2004	Matt Forbeck	IDW Publishing		
Dracula (comics)	Stoker's Dracula	4 issues	Limited series	October 2004 – May 2005	Bram Stoker (novel), Roy Thomas (adaptation)	Marvel Comics	Completion of Thomas' serialised adaptation of the novel; the first issue reprints the entire first third of the story, the second issue concludes the reprint of the remainder of the original progress and continues though new artwork by Giordano for the remaining three issues; later reprinted in full color as Dracula (2010) from July to September 2010.	
Dracula (comics)	Dracula vs. King Arthur	4 issues	Limited series	June 2005 – August 2006	Adam Beranek, Chris Beranek	Silent Devil		
Dracula (comics)	Dracula vs. Capone	1 issue	Limited series (planned)	October 2006	Jim Krueger	Silent Devil		
Dracula (comics)	Graphic Classics: Dracula	1 volume	Graphic novel	October 2007	Bram Stoker (novel) Fiona Macdonald (adaptation)	Barron's		
Dracula (comics)	Frank Frazetta's Dracula Meets the Wolfman	1 issue	One-shot	August 2008	Steve Niles	Image Comics		
Dracula (comics)	The Complete Dracula	5 issues	Limited series	May – December 2009	Bram Stoker (novel), Leah Moore (adaptation)	Dynamite Entertainment		
Dracula (comics)	Harker	1 volume	Graphic novel	November 2009	Tony Lee	Markosia		
Dracula (comics)	Bram Stoker's Death Ship: The Last Voyage of the Demeter	4 issues	Limited series	May – August 2010	Gary Gerani	IDW Publishing		
Dracula (comics)	Dracula: The Company of Monsters	12 issues	Limited series	August 2010 – July 2011	Kurt Busiek, Daryl Gregory	Boom! Studios		
The Dresden Files	The Dresden Files: Welcome to the Jungle	4 issues	Limited series	April – July 2008	Jim Butcher	Dabel Brothers Productions	Original story; prequel to Storm Front.	
The Dresden Files	The Dresden Files: Storm Front	4 issues	Limited series	November 2008 – April 2009	Jim Butcher, Mark Powers	Dabel Brothers Productions	Two-part adaptation of the eponymous first novel.	
The Dresden Files	The Dresden Files: Storm Front Volume Two	4 issues	Limited series	July 2009 – September 2010	Jim Butcher, Mark Powers	Dabel Brothers Productions (#1), Dynamite Entertainment (#2–4)	Two-part adaptation of the eponymous first novel.	
The Dresden Files	The Dresden Files: Fool Moon	8 issues	Limited series	April 2011 – October 2012	Jim Butcher, Mark Powers	Dynamite Entertainment	Adaptation of the eponymous second novel.	
The Dresden Files	The Dresden Files: Ghoul, Goblin	6 issues	Limited series	January – August 2013	Jim Butcher, Mark Powers	Dynamite Entertainment		
The Dresden Files	The Dresden Files: War Cry	5 issues	Limited series	June – October 2014	Jim Butcher, Mark Powers	Dynamite Entertainment		
The Dresden Files	The Dresden Files: Down Town	6 issues	Limited series	February – July 2015	Jim Butcher, Mark Powers	Dynamite Entertainment		
The Dresden Files	The Dresden Files: Wild Card	6 issues	Limited series	April – September 2016	Jim Butcher, Mark Powers	Dynamite Entertainment		
The Dresden Files	The Dresden Files: Dog Men	6 issues	Limited series	2017	Jim Butcher, Mark Powers	Dynamite Entertainment		
The Dresden Files	The Dresden Files: Bigfoot	1 volume	Graphic novel	February 2022	Jim Butcher, Mark Powers	Dynamite Entertainment	Adaptation of the 2015 short story collection Working for Bigfoot.	
Dune	Dune: House Atreides	12 issues	Limited series	October 2020 – December 2021	Brian Herbert, Kevin J. Anderson	Boom! Studios	Adapted by the authors from the 1999 prequel novel of the same title.	
Dune	Dune: Blood of the Sardaukar	#1 issue	One-shot	July 2021	Brian Herbert, Kevin J. Anderson	Boom! Studios		
Dune	Dune: A Whisper of Caladan Seas	1 issue	One-shot	December 2021	Brian Herbert, Kevin J. Anderson	Boom! Studios		
Dune	Dune: The Waters of Kanly	4 issues	Limited series	May – August 2022	Brian Herbert, Kevin J. Anderson	Boom! Studios		
Dune	Dune: House Harkonnen	8 issues	Limited series	January – August 2023	Brian Herbert, Kevin J. Anderson	Boom! Studios	Adapted by the authors from the 2000 prequel novel of the same title.	
Dune	Dune: House Corrino	8 issues	Limited series	March – November 2024	Brian Herbert, Kevin J. Anderson	Boom! Studios	Adapted by the authors from the 2001 prequel novel of the same title.	
Dune	Dune: Edge of a Crysknife – Hiding Among Harkonnens	1 issue	One-shot	July 2025	Brian Herbert, Kevin J. Anderson	Boom! Studios		
Dune	Dune: Edge of a Crysknife – Rage of Shai-Hulud	1 issue	One-shot	August 2025	Brian Herbert, Kevin J. Anderson	Boom! Studios		

== E ==
Basis	Title	Length	Format	Publication date	Authors	Publisher	Notes	Collected editions
"Eight O'Clock in the Morning"	Alien Encounters #6: "Nada"	1 issue	Comic story	April 1986	Ray Nelson	Eclipse Comics	Adapted by the author from his eponymous 1963 short story.	
Ender's Game	Main article: Ender's Game (comics)							
Ernest Haycox	Four Color (series 2) #534, 591, 613, 640: "Western Marshal"	4 issues	Limited series	February 1954, October 1954, February 1955, August 1955		Dell Comics	Based on the novel Trail Town (1941).	No
The Executioner	Mack Bolan: The Executioner	3 issues	Limited series	July – November 1993	Don Pendleton	Innovation Publishing		
The Executioner	Don Pendleton's The Executioner: Death Squad	1 volume	Graphic novel	1993	Linda Pendleton, Sandy Florea	Vivid Comics		
The Executioner	Don Pendleton's The Executioner: The Devil's Tools	3 issues	Limited series	April – August 2008	Doug Wojtowicz	IDW Publishing		
"The Exiles"	Alien Encounters #10	1 issue	Comic story	December 1986	Ray Bradbury	Eclipse Comics	Adapted by the author from his eponymous 1949 short story.	

== F ==
Basis	Title	Length	Format	Publication date	Authors	Publisher	Notes	Collected editions
Fahrenheit 451	Ray Bradbury's Fahrenheit 451: The Authorized Adaptation	1 volume	Graphic novel	July 2009	Ray Bradbury (novel and adaptation)	Hill and Wang	Adapted by the author from his eponymous 1953 novel.	
"Farewell to the Master"	Worlds Unknown #3	1 issue	Main feature	September 1973	Harry Bates (story), Roy Thomas (adaptation)	Marvel Comics	Adaptation of the eponymous 1940 short story.	
Faust	Main articles: Faust (manga) and Faust (comics)							
Fear and Loathing in Las Vegas	Hunter S. Thompson's Fear and Loathing in Las Vegas	4 issue	Limited series	May – August 2016	Hunter S. Thompson (novel), Troy Little (adaptation)	IDW Publishing	Adaptation of the eponymous 1971 novel.	
Fevre Dream	George R. R. Martin's Fevre Dream	10 issues	Limited series	March – November 2010	George R. R. Martin (novel), Daniel Abraham (adaptation)	Avatar Press	Adaptation of the eponymous 1982 novel.	
A Fine and Private Place	Peter S. Beagle's A Fine and Private Place #1	1 issue	Limited series (planned)	September 2012	Peter S. Beagle (novel), Peter B. Gillis (adaptation)	IDW Publishing	Adaptation of the eponymous 1960 novel.	
The First Men in the Moon	Classics Illustrated #144	1 issue	Main feature	May 1958	H. G. Wells (novel)	Gilberton Company, Inc.	Main feature runs for a total of 45 pages.	No
The First Men in the Moon	Marvel Classics Comics #31	1 issue	Main feature	February 1978	H. G. Wells (novel), Don McGregor (adaptation)	Marvel Comics	Main feature runs for a total of 48 pages.	No
The Food of the Gods and How It Came to Earth	Classics Illustrated	1 issue	Main feature	January 1961	H. G. Wells (novel), Alfred Sundel (adaptation)	Gilberton Company, Inc.	Main feature runs for a total of 45 pages.	No
The Food of the Gods and How It Came to Earth	Now Age Books Illustrated #64-3142	1 issue	Graphic novel	1973	Mary Shelley (novel), John Norwood Fago (adaptation)	Pendulum Press		No
The Food of the Gods and How It Came to Earth	Marvel Classics Comics #22	1 issue	Main feature	October 1977	Mary Shelley (novel), Doug Moench (adaptation)	Marvel Comics	Main feature runs for a total of 48 pages.	No
The Forever War	The Forever War (Dutch: De Eeuwige Oorlog)	3 volumes	Graphic novel	1988	Joe Haldeman (novel and adaptation)	Dupuis	Adaptation of the eponymous 1974 novel.	
Frankenstein (comics)	Prize Comics #7—68: "New Adventures of Frankenstein"	62 issues	Main feature (part of an ongoing series)	December 1940 – March 1948	Dick Briefer (credited as Frank N. Stein)	Crestwood Publications		
Frankenstein (comics)	Frankenstein	33 issues	Ongoing series	1945 – November 1954	Dick Briefer (credited as Frank N. Stein)	Crestwood Publications		
Frankenstein (comics)	Classic Comics #26	1 issue	Main feature	December 1945	Mary Shelley (novel), Ruth Roche (adaptation)	Gilberton Company, Inc.	Main feature runs for a total of 45 pages.	No
Frankenstein (comics)	Marvel Classics Comics #20	1 issue	Main feature	August 1977	Mary Shelley (novel), John Warner (adaptation)	Marvel Comics	Main feature runs for a total of 48 pages.	No
Frankenstein (comics)	Now Age Books Illustrated #64-1020	1 issue	Graphic novel	1973	Mary Shelley (novel), Otto Binder (adaptation)	Pendulum Press	Main feature runs for a total of 56 pages.	
Frankenstein (comics)	Frankenstein (1989)	3 issues	Limited series	March – August 1989	Mary Shelley (novel), Martin Powell (adaptation)	Eternity Comics		
Frankenstein (comics)	Frankenstein: or The Modern Prometheus	1 issue	Graphic novel	October 1994	Mary Shelley (novel), Eric Jackson (adaptation)	Caliber Comics		
Frankenstein (comics)	The Frankenstein/Dracula War	3 issues	Limited series	February – April 2015	Roy Thomas, Jean-Marc Lofficier	Topps Comics		
Frankenstein (comics)	Graphic Classics: Frankenstein	1 volume	Graphic novel	April 2008	Mary Shelley (novel), Fiona Macdonald (adaptation)	Barron's		
Frankenstein (comics)	Jingle Belle: Santa Claus vs. Frankenstein	1 issue	One-shot	December 2008	Paul Dini	Top Cow Productions	The monster is the main antagonist of the main feature of this issue.	
Frankenstein (comics)	Frankenstein Alive, Alive!	4 issues	Limited series	May 2012 – January 2018	Steve Niles	IDW Publishing		
Frankenstein (comics)	Gris Grimly's Frankenstein	1 volume	Graphic novel	August 2013	Mary Shelley (novel), Gris Grimly (adaptation)	Balzer + Bray	Gris Grimly mainly provided the art and cover for this work, using the text of the novel as a direct source for the illustrations done in the usual Grimly style.	
Frankenstein (comics)	Manga Classics: Frankenstein	1 volume	Original English-language manga	October 2020	Mary Shelley (novel), M. Chandler (adaptation)	Udon Comics		
Fu Manchu	The Mask of Dr. Fu Manchu	1 issue	One-shot	1951	Sax Rohmer (novel)	Avon Comics	Loosely based on the fifth novel The Mask of Fu Manchu (1932); main feature runs for a total of 25 pages.	No

== G ==
Basis	Title	Length	Format	Publication date	Authors	Publisher	Notes	Collected editions
The Great and Secret Show	Clive Barker's The Great and Secret Show	12 issues	Limited series		Paul Dini	IDW Publishing		
Green Mansions	Classics Illustrated #90	1 issue	Main feature	December 1951	George Lipscomb	Gilberton Company, Inc.		No
Green Mansions	Rima the Jungle Girl	7 issues	Ongoing series	April–May 1974 – April–May 1975	William Henry Hudson (character), Robert Kanigher	DC Comics		
Goosebumps	Main article: Goosebumps (comics)							
Great Expectations	Classics Illustrated #43	1 issue	One-shot	November 1947	?	Gilberton Company, Inc.		No
Great Expectations	Now Age Books Illustrated #64-3886	1 volume	Graphic novel	1979	Stella Alico	Pendulum Press		No
Great Expectations	Manga Classics: Great Expectations	1 volume	Graphic novel	May 2015	Stacy King (dialogue), Nokman Poon (adaptation)	Udon Entertainment		No
The Gremlins	Return of the Gremlins	3 issues	Limited comics	March – May 2008	Mike Richardson	Dark Horse Comics	Continuation of the 1943 novel by Roald Dahl.	
Gulliver's Travels	Funny Book #2: "Gulliver in Giant-Land"	1 issue	Comic story	December 23, 1942	?	Parents' Magazine Press	Based on "Part II: A Voyage to Brobdingnag", twelve pages total.	No
Gulliver's Travels	Classic Comics #16	1 issue	One-shot	December 1943	Daniel Kushner	Gilberton Company, Inc.		
Gulliver's Travels	Dell Junior Treasury #3	1 issue	One-shot	January 1956	Gaylord DuBois	Dell Comics		
Gulliver's Travels	Gulliver's Travels #1	1 issue	One-shot	August 6, 1965	?	Dell Comics		No
Gulliver's Travels	Now Age Books Illustrated #64-1425	1 volume	Graphic novel	1974	John Norwood Fago	Pendulum Press		No
Gulliver's Travels	3-D Color Classics #2	1 issue	Minicomic	1995	Peter Stone	Wendy's	Promotional comic given away with Wendy's Kids' Meal.	No

== H ==
Basis	Title	Length	Format	Publication date	Authors	Publisher	Notes	Collected editions
"The Haunter in the Dark"	Journey into Mystery (1972) #4	1 issue	Main feature	April 1973	H. P. Lovecraft (short story), Roy Goulart (adaptation)	Marvel Comics	Ten pages total; art by Gene Colan and Dan Adkins.	No
Helena	Helena	1		NewPOP		2014	Adaptation of the 1876 novel of the same title by Machado de Assis.	
Hell House	Richard Matheson's Hell House	4 issues	Limited series	December 2004 – June 2005	Ian Edginton	IDW Publishing	Adaptarion of the eponymous 1971 novel by Richard Matheson.	
The Hitchhiker's Guide to the Galaxy	The Hitchhiker's Guide to the Galaxy	3 issues	Limited series	1993	John Carnell	DC Comics	Adaptation of the eponymous 1979 novel by Douglas Adams.	
The Hobbit	The Hobbit	3 issues	Limited series	1989 – 1990	J. R. R. Tolkien (novel), Charles Dixon (adaptation)	Eclipse Comics	Adaptation of the eponymous 1937 novel by J. R. R. Tolkien.	
"The Horror from the Mound"	Chamber of Chills #2	1 issue	Main feature	January 1973	Robert E. Howard (short story), Gardner F. Fox (adaptation)	Marvel Comics	Eight pages total; art and colors by Frank Brunner.	No
The Hunchback of Notre-Dame	Classic Comics #18	1 issue	Main feature	March 1944	Victor Hugo (novel), Evelyn Goodman (adaptation)	Gilberton Company, Inc.		
The Hunchback of Notre-Dame	Now Age Books Illustrated #64-1395	1 volume	Graphic novel	1974	Victor Hugo (novel), Naunerle Farr (adaptation)	Pendulum Press		
The Hunchback of Notre-Dame	Graphic Classics: The Hunchback of Notre Dame	1 volume	Graphic novel	May 2007	Victor Hugo (novel), Michael Ford (adaptation)	Barron's		
The Hunchback of Notre-Dame	The Hunchback of Notre Dame (2012)	1 volume	Graphic novel	July 2012	Victor Hugo (novel), Tim Conrad (adaptation)	Dark Horse Comics		
The Hunchback of Notre-Dame	The Hunchback of Notre Dame (2025)	1 volume	Graphic novel	2025	Victor Hugo (novel), Georges Bess (adaptation)	Magnetic Press		
The Hurricane	Classics Illustrated #120	1 issue	Main feature	June 1954	Harry G. Miller	Gilberton Company, Inc.	Adaptation of the eponymous 1936 novel by Charles Nordhoff and James Norman Hall.	

== I ==
Basis	Title	Length	Format	Publication date	Authors	Publisher	Notes	Collected editions
I Am Legend	Richard Matheson's I Am Legend	4 issues	Limited series	1991	Richard Matheson (novel), Steve Niles (adaptation)	Eclipse Comics		
Infected	Infected	1 issue	Limited series (planned)	August 2012	Scott Sigler (novel), Chad Minshew (adaptation)	IDW Publishing		No
The Invisible Man	Superior Stories #1	1 issue	Main feature	May-June 1955	H. G. Wells (novel)	Nesbit Publishers Inc.	Twenty-eight pages total; art by Pete Morisi.	No
The Invisible Man	Classics Illustrated #153	1 issue	Main feature	November 1959	H. G. Wells (novel), Alfred Sundel (adaptation)	Gilberton Company, Inc.	Forty-five pages total; art by Norman Nodel.	No
The Invisible Man	Supernatural Thrillers #2	1 issue	Main feature	February 1973	H. G. Wells (novel), Ron Goulart (adaptation)	Marvel Comics	Twenty-one pages total; art by Dan Adkins and Val Mayerik.	No
The Invisible Man	Now Age Books Illustrated #64-131X	1 volume	Graphic novel	1974	H. G. Wells (novel), Otto Binder (adaptation)	Pendulum Press	Fifty-six pages total; art by Alex Niño.	
The Invisible Man	Marvel Classics Comics #25	1 issue	Main feature	1977	H. G. Wells (novel), Doug Moench (adaptation)	Marvel Comics	Forty-eight pages total; art by Amado Castrillo and Rudy Mesina with colors by Petra Goldberg.	
The Invisible Man	Classics Illustrated #20	1 volume	Graphic novel	March 1991	H. G. Wells (novel), Rick Geary (adaptation)	Berkley Books, First Publishing	Forty-five pages total; art by Rick Geary.	No
The Invisible Man	Illustrated Classex #3	1 issue	Main feature	April 1992	H. G. Wells (novel), Nat Gertler (adaptation)	Comic Zone Productions	Ten pages total; art by Nathan Smith and Bobby Rae.	No
The Island of Doctor Moreau	Classics Illustrated #12	1 volume	Graphic novel	August 1990	H. G. Wells (novel), Steven Grant (adaptation)	Berkley Books, First Publishing		
The Island of Doctor Moreau	The Island of Dr. Moreau (2018)	1 volume	Graphic novel	October 2018	H. G. Wells (novel), Olivier Dobremel (Dobbs) (adaptation)	Insight Comics		
The Island of Doctor Moreau	The Island of Dr. Moreau (2019)	2 issues	Limited series	July – August 2019	Ted Adams, Gabriel Rodriguez	IDW Publishing		
The Island of Doctor Moreau	Red Agent: Island of Dr. Moreau	5 issues	Limited series	January – June 2020	Brian Studler	Zenescope Entertainment		
"It!"	Supernatural Thrillers #1	1 issue	Main feature	December 1972	Theodore Sturgeon (short story), Roy Thomas (adaptation)	Marvel Comics		No
Ivanhoe	New Fun: The Big Comic Magazine #1–6	26 issues	Main feature (part of an ongoing series)	February – October 1935	Walter Scott (novel), Malcolm Wheeler-Nicholson (adaptation)	DC Comics	Presented as "episodes" 1 to 6; art by Charles Flanders (#1–4) and Raymond Perry (#5–6).	No
Ivanhoe	More Fun Comics #7–8, 10–27	26 issues	Main feature (part of an ongoing series)	January 1936 – November 1937	Walter Scott (novel), Malcolm Wheeler-Nicholson (adaptation)	DC Comics	Continued from New Fun: The Big Comic Magazine #6, presented as "episodes" 7 to 26; art by Raymond Perry.	No
Ivanhoe	Classic Comics #2	1 issue	Main feature	December 1941	Walter Scott (novel), Al Kanter (adaptation)	Gilberton Company, Inc.	Sixty-three pages total; art by Edd Ashe.	No
Ivanhoe	Ivanhoe (1963)	1 issue	One-shot	July-September 1963	Walter Scott (novel)	Dell Comics	Thirty-two pages total; art by Jack Lehti.	No
Ivanhoe	Joyas Literarias Juveniles #16	1 issue	Main feature	1971	Walter Scott (novel), José Antonio Vidal Sales (adaptation)	Editorial Bruguera, S.A.	Thirty pages total; art by Juan Escandell.	
Ivanhoe	Now Age Books Illustrated #64-131X	1 volume	Graphic novel	1978	Walter Scott (novel), Naunerle Farr (adaptation)	Pendulum Press	Fifty-six pages total; art by Gerry Talaoc.	
Ivanhoe	Classics Illustrated #25	1 volume	Graphic novel	March 1991	Walter Scott (novel), Mark Harris (adaptation)	Berkley Books, First Publishing	Forty-five pages total; art by Ray Lago.	No
Ivanhoe	Les grands Classiques de la littérature en bande dessinée #37	1 volume	Graphic novel	2018	Walter Scott (novel), Stefano Enna (adaptation)	Glénat	Art by Stefano Garau with colors by Minte.	

== J ==
Basis	Title	Length	Format	Publication date	Authors	Publisher	Notes	Collected editions
James Bond (comics)	James Bond 007: Permission to Die	3 issues	Limited series	July – September 1991		Eclipse Comics		
James Bond (comics)	James Bond 007: Serpent's Tooth	3 issues	Limited series	July 1992 – February 1993		Dark Horse Comics		
James Bond (comics)	James Bond 007: Shattered Helix	2 issues	Limited series	June – July 1992		Dark Horse Comics		
James Bond (comics)	James Bond 007: A Silent Armageddon	2 issues	Limited series	March – May 1993		Dark Horse Comics		
James Bond (comics)	James Bond 007: The Quasimodo Gambit	3 issues	Limited series	January – May 1995		Dark Horse Comics		
James Bond (comics)	James Bond (series 1)	12 issues	Limited series	2015 – 2016		Dynamite Entertainment		
James Bond (comics)	James Bond 007: Hammerhead	6 issues	Limited series	2016 – 2017		Dynamite Entertainment		
James Bond (comics)	James Bond: Felix Leiter	6 issues	Limited series	2017		Dynamite Entertainment		
James Bond (comics)	James Bond (series 2)	6 issues	Limited series	March – August 2017		Dynamite Entertainment		
James Bond (comics)	James Bond: Kill Chain	6 issues	Limited series	July – December 2017		Dynamite Entertainment		
James Bond (comics)	James Bond: The Body	6 issues	Limited series	January – June 2018		Dynamite Entertainment		
James Bond (comics)	James Bond 007	12 issues	Limited series	November 2018 – October 2019		Dynamite Entertainment		
James Bond (comics)	James Bond (series 3)	6 issues	Limited series	December 2019 – July 2020		Dynamite Entertainment		
James Bond (comics)	James Bond: Agent of SPECTRE	5 issues	Limited series	March – July 2021		Dynamite Entertainment		
James Bond (comics)	James Bond: Himeros	5 issues	Limited series	October 2021 – February 2022		Dynamite Entertainment		
James Bond (comics)	007	6 issues	Limited series	August – November 2022		Dynamite Entertainment		
The Jungle Book	Classics Illustrated #83	1 issue	Main feature	May 1951	?	Gilberton Company, Inc.		No
The Jungle Book	Four Color (series 2) #487, 582, 620: "Rudyard Kipling's Mowgli — Jungle Book"	3 issues	One-shot	August 1953, August 1954, April 1955	Paul S. Newman	Dell Comics	Tryout issues for a possible ongoing series that went unpublished.	No
The Jungle Book	Marvel Fanfare (Volume 1) #8—11	4 issues	Back-up feature, serialised storyline	May – November 1983	Mary Jo Duffy, Gil Kane	Marvel Comics		
The Jungle Book	Night Music #3: "The King's Ankus"	1 issue	One-shot	March 1985	P. Craig Russell	Eclipse Comics		Jungle Book Stories TP (1561631523 / 978-1561631520)
The Jungle Book	Rudyard Kipling's Red Dog #1	1 issue	One-shot	February 1988	P. Craig Russell	Eclipse Comics		Jungle Book Stories TP (1561631523 / 978-1561631520)
The Jungle Book	Comics Lit #6–8: "The Spring Running"	3 issues	Serialised storyline	NBM	P. Craig Russell	1995		Jungle Book Stories TP (1561631523 / 978-1561631520)
The Jungle Book	The Jungle Book (2011)	1 volume	Graphic novel	December 2011	Dan Johnson	Campfire Classics		

== K ==
Basis	Title	Length	Format	Publication date	Authors	Publisher	Notes	Collected editions
The Keep	The Keep	5 issues	Limited series	F. Paul Wilson	IDW Publishing	September 2005 – March 2006	Adapted by the author from his eponymous 1981 novel.	
Kidnapped	Classics Illustrated #46	1 issue	Main feature	April 1948	John O'Rourke	Gilberton Company, Inc.		No
Kidnapped	Sunday Pix (volume 8) #41–49	9 issues	Serialised storyline	October 7 – December 2, 1956	?	David C. Cook Publishing Company		No
Kidnapped	Now Age Books Illustrated #64-1328	1 volume	Graphic novel	1974	Kin Platt (credited as Nick Tall)	Pendulum Press		Paperback: 0883011328
Kidnapped	Kidnapped (2007)	1 volume	Graphic novel	January 13–15, 2007	Alan Grant	Waverley Books		Hardcover: 1902407393 / 978-1902407395; Paperback: 1902407385 / 978-1902407388
Kidnapped	Graphic Classics: Kidnapped	1 volume	Graphic novel	May 2007	Fiona MacDonald	Barron's		Paperback: 0764159801 / 978-0764159800
Kidnapped	Kidnapped! (2009)	5 issues	Limited series	January – May 2009	Roy Thomas	Marvel Comics	Part of the Marvel Illustrated imprint.	Hardcover: 0785136304/978-0785136309; Paperback: 0785135324/978-0785135326
Kidnapped	Kidnapped (2011)	1 volume	Graphic novel	April 2011	Mark Jones	Campfire Classics		Paperback: ISBN 9380028520 / ISBN 978-9380028521
"Killdozer!"	Worlds Unknown #6	1 issue	Main feature	April 1974	Gerry Conway	Marvel Comics	Adaptation of the eponymous 1944 novella by Theodore Sturgeon.	
Kim	Classics Illustrated #143	1 issue	Main feature	March 1948	?	Gilberton Company, Inc.		No
Kim	Kim (2011)	1 volume	Graphic novel	January 2011	Lewis Helfand	Campfire Classics		
King of the Khyber Rifles	Classics Illustrated #107: "King — of the Khyber Rifles"	1 issue	Main feature	May 1953	?	Gilberton Company, Inc.	Adaptation of the eponymous 1916 novel by Talbot Mundy.	No

== L ==
Based on	Title	Length	Format	Publication date	Authors	Publisher	Notes	Collected editions
Land of Oz	First Graphic Novel #5: "The Enchanted Apples of Oz"	1 volume	Graphic novel	February 1986	Eric Shanower	First Comics		
Land of Oz	First Graphic Novel #13: "The Ice King of Oz"	1 volume	Graphic novel	November 1987	Eric Shanower	First Comics		
Land of Oz	The Forgotten Forest of Oz	1 volume	Graphic novel	October 1988	Eric Shanower	First Comics		
Land of Oz	Oz Squad	10 issues	Limited series	October 1991 – February 1991	Steven Ahlquist	Brave New Words, Patchwork Press		
Land of Oz	Oz	21 issues	Ongoing series	1994 – March 1997	Stuart Kerr, Ralph Griffith	Caliber Comics		Oz: Mayhem in Munchkinland! TPB; Oz: A Gathering of Heroes TPB
Land of Oz	Oz Special: Freedom Fighters	1 issue	One-shot	1995	Stuart Kerr, Ralph Griffith	Caliber Comics		
Land of Oz	Oz Special: Lion	1 issue	One-shot	1995	Stuart Kerr, Ralph Griffith	Caliber Comics		
Land of Oz	Oz Special: Scarecrow	1 issue	One-shot	1995	Stuart Kerr, Ralph Griffith	Caliber Comics		
Land of Oz	Oz Special: Tin Man	1 issue	One-shot	1995	Stuart Kerr, Ralph Griffith	Caliber Comics		
Land of Oz	Oz Squad Special	1 issue	One-shot	December 1995	Steven Ahlquist	Millennium Publications		
Land of Oz	Little Oz Squad	1 issue	One-shot	1995	Steven Ahlquist	Patchwork Press		
Land of Oz	Oz: Romance in Rags	3 issues	Limited series	1996	Stuart Kerr, Ralph Griffith	Caliber Comics		
Land of Oz	Oz: Straw & Sorcery	3 issues	Limited series	1997	Stuart Kerr, Ralph Griffith	Caliber Comics		
Land of Oz	Oz: Daemonstorm	1 issue	One-shot	1997	Joe Martin, Tim Parsons, Stuart Kerr, Ralph Griffith	Caliber Comics		
Land of Oz	The Land of Oz	9 issues	Limited series	November 1998 – May 2000	Gary Bishop, Bill Bryan	Arrow Comics		
Land of Oz	The Oz/Wonderland Chronicles	6 issues	Limited series	December 2005 – April 2011	Ben Avery, Casey Heying	BuyMeToys		
Land of Oz	The Oz/Wonderland Chronicles: Jack & Cat Special	1 issue	One-shot	April 2008	Ben Avery, Casey Heying, Ryan Sergeant, Craig Rousseau	BuyMeToys		
Land of Oz	The Oz/Wonderland Chronicles: Jack & Cat Tales	3 issues	Limited series	April 2009 – April 2012	Avery, Antomattei, Miller, Sevilla	BuyMeToys		
Land of Oz	The Wonderful Wizard of Oz	8 issues	Limited series	February – September 2009	Eric Shanower	Marvel Comics		
Land of Oz	The Marvelous Land of Oz	8 issues	January – September 2010	Limited series	Eric Shanower	Marvel Comics		
Land of Oz	The Oz/Wonderland Chronicles: Prelude to Evil	3 issues	Limited series	April 2010 – February 2013	Ben Avery, Casey Heying, Brianna Garcia, Pedro Maia	BuyMeToys		
Land of Oz	The Royal Historian of Oz	5 issues	Limited series	June 2010 – 2011	Tommy Kovac	Slave Labor Graphics		
Land of Oz	Oz/Wonderland Kids	1 issue	One-shot	January 2011	Ben Avery	BuyMeToys		
Land of Oz	Ozma of Oz	8 issues	Limited series	January – September 2011	Eric Shanower	Marvel Comics		
Land of Oz	The Legend of Oz: The Wicked West (series 1)	7 issues	Limited series	October 2011 – August 2012	Tom Hutchison	Big Dog Ink		
Land of Oz	Dorothy and the Wizard in Oz	8 issues	Limited series	November 2011 – August 2012	Eric Shanower	Marvel Comics		
Land of Oz	The Legend of Oz: The Wicked West (series 2)	18 issues	Ongoing series	October 2012 – May 2014	Tom Hutchison	Big Dog Ink		
Land of Oz	Road to Oz	6 issues	Limited series	November 2012 – May 2013	Eric Shanower	Marvel Comics		
Land of Oz	The Steam Engines of Oz	3 issues	Limited series	July 2013 – November 2013	Sean O'Reilly, Erik W. Hendrix	Arcana Studio		
Land of Oz	The Emerald City of Oz	5 issues	Limited series	September 2013 – February 2014	Eric Shanower	Marvel Comics		
Land of Oz	The Legend of Oz: The Wicked West (series 3)	6 issues	Limited series	October 2015 – March 2016	Tom Hutchison	Big Dog Ink		
The Last Days of Pompeii	Classics Illustrated #35	1 issue	Main feature	March 1947	I. Thos	Gilberton Company, Inc.		
The Last Unicorn	The Last Unicorn	6 issues	Limited series	April 2010 – November 2010	Peter B. Gillis	IDW Publishing		Hardcover; Trade paperback
Leatherstocking Tales	Classic Comics #4: "The Last of the Mohicans"	1 issue	One-shot		Gilberton Company, Inc.	August 1942		
Leatherstocking Tales	Classic Comics #17: "The Deerslayer"	1 issue	One-shot		Gilberton Company, Inc.	January 1944		
Leatherstocking Tales	Classic Comics #22: "The Pathfinder"	1 issue	One-shot		Gilberton Company, Inc.	October 1944		
Leatherstocking Tales	Classics Illustrated #37: "The Pioneers"	1 issue	One-shot		Gilberton Company, Inc.	May 1947		
Leatherstocking Tales	Classics Illustrated #58: "The Prairie"	1 issue	One-shot		Gilberton Company, Inc.	April 1949		
Leatherstocking Tales	The Last of the Mohicans (20077)	6 issues	Limited series	July – December 2007		Marvel Comics	Published under the Marvel Illustrated imprint.	
Lieut. Gullivar Jones: His Vacation	Creatures on the Loose #16–21: "Gullivar Jones, Warrior of Mars"	6 issues	Serialized storyline		Marvel Comics	March 1972 – January 1973		
Lieut. Gullivar Jones: His Vacation	Monsters Unleashed #4—8: "Gullivar Jones, Warrior of Mars"	5 issues	Serialized storyline		Marvel Comics	January—September 1974		
The Little Savage	Classics Illustrated #137	1 issue	Main feature	March 1957		Gilberton Company, Inc.	?	
Logan's Run	Logan's Run	6 issues	Limited series	June 1990 – April 1991	Barry Blair	Adventure Publications		
Logan's Run	Logan's World	6 issues	Limited series	May 1991 – March 1992	Barry Blair	Adventure Publications	Adaptation of the 1977 sequel novel.	
Logan's Run	Logan's Run: Last Day	6 issues	Limited series	January – June 2010		TidalWave Productions		
Logan's Run	Logan's Run: Aftermath	4 issues	Limited series	May – August 2011		TidalWave Productions		
Lorna Doone	Classic Comics #32	1 issue	Main feature	December 1946	Ruth Roche			
Luke Short	Four Color (series 2) #580: "Six Gun Ranch"	8 issues	One-shot		Dell Comics	August 1954	Adaptation of the novel Raw Land (1940).	No
Luke Short	Four Color (series 2) #651: "King Colt"	8 issues	One-shot		Dell Comics	September 1955	Adaptation of the 1937 novel of the same title.	No
Luke Short	Four Color (series 2) #739: "Bounty Guns"	8 issues	One-shot		Dell Comics	October 1956	Adaptation of the 1939 novel of the same title.	No
Luke Short	Four Color (series 2) #771: "Brand of Empire"	8 issues	One-shot		Dell Comics	March 1957	Adaptation of the 1937 novel of the same title.	No
Luke Short	Four Color (series 2) #807: "Savage Range"	8 issues	One-shot		Dell Comics	June 1957	Adaptation of the 1938 novel of the same title.	No
Luke Short	Four Color (series 2) #848: "Marauders' Moon"	8 issues	One-shot		Dell Comics	October 1957	Adaptation of the 1937 novel of the same title.	No
Luke Short	Four Color (series 2) #875: "Trumpets West",	8 issues	One-shot		Dell Comics	February 1958	Adaptation of the 1945 novel of the same title.	No
Luke Short	Four Color (series 2) #927: "Top Gun"	8 issues	One-shot		Dell Comics	August 1958	Adaptation of the novel Test Pit (1939).	No

== M ==
Basis	Title	Length	Format	Publication date	Authors	Publisher	Notes	Collected editions
The Man Who Laughs	Classics Illustrated #71	1 issue	Main feature	May 1950	?	Gilberton Company, Inc.		No
"The Man Without a Country"	Classics Illustrated #63	1 issue	Main feature	September 1949	John O'Rourke	Gilberton Company, Inc.		No
"Master and Man"	Classics Illustrated #159	1 issue	Main feature	1963	Alfred Sundel	Thorpe & Porter		No
The Master of Ballantrae	Classics Illustrated #82	1 issue	Main feature	April 1951	Ken Fitch	Gilberton Company, Inc.		No
Master of the World	Classics Illustrated #163	1 issue	Main feature	July 1961	Alfred Sundel	Gilberton Company, Inc.		No
Maza of the Moon	Rocket to the Moon	1 issue	One-shot	1951	Otis Adelbert Kline (novel), Walter B. Gibson (adaptation)	Avon Comics	Presented in four chapters: Chapter 1 (seven pages), Chapter 2 (seven pages), Chapter 3 (five pages) and Chapter 4 (six pages). Twenty-five pages total; art by Charles Nicholas (Chapter 1) and Joe Orlando (Chapters 2–4).	No
Men of Iron	Classics Illustrated #88	1 issue	Main feature	October 1951	John O'Rourke	Gilberton Company, Inc.		No
Michael Strogoff	Classic Comics #28	1 issue	Main feature	June 1946	Pat Adams	Gilberton Company, Inc.		No
Millennium	Millennium: The Girl with the Dragon Tattoo	2 issues	Limited series	July – August 2017	Sylvain Runberg	Titan Comics	Adaptation of the first novel.	
Millennium	Millennium: The Girl Who Played with Fire	2 issues	Limited series	October – November 2017	Sylvain Runberg	Titan Comics	Adaptation of the second novel.	
Millennium	Millennium: The Girl Who Kicked the Hornet's Nest	2 issues	Limited series	January – February 2018	Sylvain Runberg	Titan Comics	Adaptation of the third novel.	
Millennium	Millennium: The Girl Who Danced With Death	3 issues	Limited series	September – November 2018	Sylvain Runberg	Titan Comics		
Moby-Dick	Classic Comics #5	1 issue	Main feature	September 1942	Louis Zansky	Gilberton Company, Inc.		No
Moby-Dick	Moby Dick (2008)	6 issues	Limited series	April – September 2008	Roy Thomas	Marvel Comics		
Moby-Dick	Moby Dick (1998)	1 volume	Graphic novel	January 1998	Will Eisner	NBM		
Moby-Dick	Graphic Classics: Moby Dick	1 volume	Graphic novel	May 2007	Sophie Furse	Barron's		
Moby-Dick	Moby Dick (2010)	1 volume	Graphic novel	July 2010	Lance Stahlberg	Campfire Classics		
The Moonstone	Classic Comics #30	1 issue	Main feature	September 1946	Wilkie Collins (novel), Dan Levin (adaptation)	Gilberton Company, Inc.	Fifty pages total; art by Don Rico.	No
Mr Midshipman Easy	Classics Illustrated #74	1 issue	Main feature	August 1950	Frederick Marryat (novel), Ken Fitch (adaptation)	Gilberton Company, Inc.	Forty-four pages total; art by Bob Lamme.	No
"The Music of Eric Zann"	Chamber of Darkness #5	1 issue	Main feature	June 1970	H. P. Lovecraft (short story), Roy Thomas (adaptation)	Marvel Comics	Seven pages total; art by Johnny Craig with colors by Marie Severin.	No
The Mutineers	Classics Illustrated #122	1 issue	Main feature	September 1954	Charles Boardman Hawes (novel), Harry G. Miller (adaptation)	Gilberton Company, Inc.	Forty-five pages total; art by Pete Costanza.	No

== N ==
Basis	Title	Length	Format	Publication date	Authors	Publisher	Notes	Collected editions
Nancy Drew	Nancy Drew and the Hardy Boys: The Big Lie	6 issues	Limited series	2017	Anthony Del Col	Dynamite Entertainment		
Nancy Drew	Nancy Drew	5 issues	Limited series	June – October 2018	Kelly Thompson	Dynamite Entertainment		
Nancy Drew	Nancy Drew and the Hardy Boys: The Death of Nancy Drew	6 issues	Limited series	June – November 2020	Anthony Del Col	Dynamite Entertainment		
Needle	7 Billion Needles	23 chapters	Serialized manga	April 2008 – March 2010	Nobuaki Tadano	Media Factory	Adaptation of the eponymous 1950 novel by Hal Clement; serialized in Monthly Comic Flapper.	Collected in 4 tankōbon volumes.
Nestor Burma	Main article: Nestor Burma § Other media							
Neuromancer	Neuromancer	1 volume	Graphic novel	January 1989	Tom De Haven	Epic Comics		
The New York Trilogy	City of Glass	1 volume	Graphic novel	1994	Paul Karasik, David Mazzucchelli	Avon Books		

== O ==
Based on	Title	Length	Format	Publication date	Authors	Publisher	Notes	Collected editions
Outlander	The Exile: An Outlander Graphic Novel	1 volume	Graphic novel	October 2010	Diana Gabaldon	Del Rey Books	Adapted by the author from the first third of her eponymous 1991 novel.	No
Owd Bob	Four Color (series 2) #729: "Bob, Son of Battle"	1 issue	One-shot	November 1956	Gaylord DuBois	Dell Comics	Adaptation of the eponymous 1898 novel by Alfred Ollivant.	
The Ox-Bow Incident	Classics Illustrated #125	1 issue	One-shot	March 1955	Lorenz Graham	Gilberton Company, Inc.	Adaptation of the eponymous 1940 novel by Walter Van Tilburg Clark.	No

== P ==
Basis	Title	Length	Format	Publication date	Authors	Publisher	Notes	Collected editions
Parker	Richard Stark's Parker: The Hunter	1 volume	Graphic novel	July 2009	Darwyn Cooke	IDW Publishing	Adaptation of the first novel.	
Parker	Richard Stark's Parker: The Outfit	1 volume	Graphic novel	October 2010	Darwyn Cooke	IDW Publishing	Adaptation of the third novel.	
Parker	Richard Stark's Parker: The Score	1 volume	Graphic novel	July 2012	Darwyn Cooke	IDW Publishing	Adaptation of the fifth novel.	
Parker	Richard Stark's Parker: Slayground	1 volume	Graphic novel	December 2013	Darwyn Cooke	IDW Publishing	Adaptation of the fourteenth novel.	
Pellucidar	Korak, Son of Tarzan #46: "The World Within"	1 issue	Back-up feature	June 1972	Len Wein	DC Comics	First installment of the adaptation of the first novel At the Earth's Core; the story runs for a total of ten pages.	No
Pellucidar	Weird Worlds #1—5: "At the Earth's Core"	5 issues	Back-up feature, serial	September 1972 – April–May 1973	Len Wein (#1, 2, 3), Dennis O'Neil (#4, 5)	DC Comics	Remainder of the adaptation of the first novel; chapter titles for each installment: "The Arena of Sudden Death!" (11 pages), "Slaves of the Mahars" (12 pages), "Temple of the Damned!" (11 pages), "Jubal the Ugly One" (12 pages) and "Combat!" (10 pages).	No
Pellucidar	Weird Worlds #6—7: "Pellucidar"	2 issues	Back-up feature, serial	July – October 1973	Len Wein	DC Comics	Adaptation of the second novel; chapter titles for each installment: "Return!" (10 pages) and "The Trap" (10 pages).	No
Peter Pan	Peter Pan: Return to Never-Never Land	2 issues	Limited series	July – August 1991	Ron Fortier	Adventure Publications	Foreword, introduction, preface and afterword written by Martin Powell; "Hooked" text article in #2 written by Jim Korkis.	
Peter Pan	Peter Pan and the Warlords of Oz	1 issue	One-shot	November 1998	Rob Hand	Hand of Doom Publications	Crossover with the universe of L. Frank Baum's Oz books.	
Peter Pan	Peter Pan and the Warlords of Oz: Dead Head Water	1 issue	One-shot	February 1999	Rob Hand	Hand of Doom Publications	Crossover with the universe of L. Frank Baum's Oz books.	
Peter Pan	Peter Pan and the Warlords of Oz: Wonderland Purgatory #0	1 issue	One-shot	August 1999	Rob Hand	Hand of Doom Publications	Crossover with the universe of L. Frank Baum's Oz books.	
Peter Pan	Peter Pan the Vampire	3 issues	Limited series	2009	Gary Brantner	Rentnarb Studios Comics		
Peter Pan	Peter Pan: A Graphic Novel	1 issue	Graphic novel	August 2015	J. M. Barrie (play and novel), Blake A. Hoena (adaptation)	Stone Arch Books		
Peter Pan	J. M. Barrie's Peter Pan	1 issue	Graphic novel	July 2016	J. M. Barrie (play and novel), Stephen White (adaptation)	Birlinn		
Peter Pan	Peter Pan in Mummy Land	1 volume	Graphic novel	January 2020	Benjamin Harper	Capstone Publishing		
The Phantom of the Opera (comics)	Scream #3	1 issue	Main feature	December 1973	Gaston Leroux (novel), Al Hewetson (adaptation)	Skywald	This adaptation, with art by Jesús Durán, was presented in two chapters each consisting of nine pages: "The Good... The Bad... And the Weird" and "The Torture Chamber" respectively, running for a total of eighteen pages.	
The Phantom of the Opera (comics)	The Phantom of the Opera (1991)	1 issue	One-shot	December 1991	Gaston Leroux (novel), Mitchell Perkins (adaptation)	Innovation Publishing		
The Phantom of the Opera (comics)	The Trap-Door Maker: A Prequel to the Phantom of the Opera	3 issues	Limited series	2005	Pete Bregman	Treehouse Animation Comics	Prequel to the novel, presented as Books One, Two and Three, each consisting of three chapters in each issue, running for a total of eight chapters.	
The Phantom of the Opera (comics)	The Phantom of the Opera (2012)	1 volume	Graphic novel	2012	Bronwyn Elvis Chochinov	?	Fan-made graphic novel adapted from the 1986 Andrew Lloyd Webber musical.	No
"Pickman's Model"	Tower of Shadows #9	1 issue	Main feature,	November 1970	Roy Thomas	Marvel Comics	Adaptation of the eponymous 1927 short story by H. P. Lovecraft.	No
The Picture of Dorian Gray	Scream #5	1 issue	Main feature	April 1974	Oscar Wilde (novel), Al Hewetson (adaptation)	Skywald	Art by Zesar; nine pages total.	
The Picture of Dorian Gray	The Picture of Dorian Gray (2008)	6 issues	Limited series	January – July 2008	Roy Thomas	Marvel Comics	Published under the Marvel Illustrated imprint.	
Pigeons from Hell	Pigeons from Hell (1988)	1 volume	Graphic novel	September 1988	Scott Hampton	Eclipse Comics	Adaptations of the eponymous 1988 short story by Robert E. Howard.	
Pigeons from Hell	Pigeons from Hell (2008)	4 issues	Limited series	April – July 2008	Joe R. Lansdale	Dark Horse Comics	Adaptations of the eponymous 1988 short story by Robert E. Howard.	
The Pilot: A Tale of the Sea	Classics Illustrated #70	1 issue	Main feature	April 1950	?	Gilberton Company, Inc.	Adaptation of the eponymous 1824 novel by James Fenimore Cooper.	No
"The Pit and the Pendulum"	Yellowjacket Comics #3	1 issue	Main feature	October 1973	Edgar Allan Poe (short story)	Ziff-Davis	Art by Gus Schrotter; seven pages total.	
"The Pit and the Pendulum"	Classics Illustrated #40: "Mysteries by Edgar Allan Poe"	1 issue	Main feature	August 1947	Edgar Allan Poe (short story), Samuel Willinsky (adaptation)	Gilberton Company, Inc.	Art by August Froehlich; thirteen pages total.	No
"The Pit and the Pendulum"	Nightmare #2	1 issue	Main feature	October 1973	Edgar Allan Poe (short story)	Ziff-Davis	Art by Everett Kinstler; five pages total.	
"The Pit and the Pendulum"	Scream #2	1 issue	Main feature	October 1973	Edgar Allan Poe (short story), Al Hewetson (adaptation)	Skywald	Art by Ricardo Villamonte; six pages total.	
"The Pit and the Pendulum"	Now Age Books Illustrated: The Best of Poe	1 issue	Main feature	1977	Edgar Allan Poe (short story), Naunerle Farr (adaptation)	Pendulum Press	Art by Nestor Redondo; ten pages total.	
"The Pit and the Pendulum"	Marvel Classics Comics #28	1 issue	Main feature	November 1977	Edgar Allan Poe (short story), Don McGregor (adaptation)	Marvel Comics	Art by Rudy Mesina; twenty-four pages total.	
Planet of the Apes	The Monkey Planet (Hungarian: A Majmok Bolygója)	1 volume	Graphic novel	1981	Pierre Boulle (novel), Ernő Zórád (adaptation)	Mokep	Adaptation of the eponymous 1963 novel by Pierre Boulle.	No
The Prisoner of Zenda	Classics Illustrated #76	1 issue	Main feature	October 1950	Ken Fitch	Gilberton Company, Inc.	Adaptation of the eponymous 1894 novel by Anthony Hope.	No
"Punishment Without Crime"	Weird Science #21	1 issue	Back-up feature	September 1953	Albert B. Feldstein	EC Comics	Adaptation of the eponymous 1950 short story by Ray Bradbury, first published in the March 1950 issue of Other Worlds.	No
Pudd'nhead Wilson	Classics Illustrated #937	1 issue	Main feature	March 1952	?	Gilberton Company, Inc.	Adaptation of the eponymous 1894 novel by Mark Twain.	No

== R ==
Basis	Title	Length	Format	Publication date	Authors	Publisher	Notes	Collected editions
The Radio Man	An Earth Man on Venus	1 issue	One-shot	1951	Ralph Milne Farley (novel)	Avon Comics	Twenty-five pages total; art by Wally Wood.	No
The Red Badge of Courage	Classics Illustrated #98	1 issue	Main feature	August 1952	?	Gilberton Company, Inc.		No
The Red Badge of Courage	The Red Badge of Courage (2005)	1 volume	Gralhic novel	May 2005	Wayne Vansant	Puffin Books		
The Red Rover	Classics Illustrated #114	1 issue	Main feature	December 1953	?	Gilberton Company, Inc.		No
The Riftwar Cycle	Riftwar	#1–5	Limited series	July – December 2009	Raymond E. Feist (characters), Bryan J. L. Glass	Marvel Comics	Based on characters from The Riftwar Saga, the first series in the eponymous cycle.	
"Rip Van Winkle"	Classic Comics #12	1 issue	Main feature	June 1943	Dan Levin	Gilberton Company, Inc.		No
Rob Roy	Classics Illustrated #118	1 issue	Main feature	April 1954	Harry G. Miller	Gilberton Company, Inc.		No
Robinson Crusoe	Classic Comics #10	1 issue	Main feature	April 1943	Evelyn Goodman	Gilberton Company, Inc.		No
Robinson Crusoe	Robinson Crusoe (1964)	1 issue	One-shot	November–January 1964	Paul S. Newman	Dell Comics		No
Robur the Conqueror	Classics Illustrated #163	1 issue	Main feature	May 1961	Alfred Sundel	Gilberton Company, Inc.		No

== S ==
Basis	Title	Length	Format	Publication date	Authors	Publisher	Notes	Collected editions
The Saint	The Saint	12 issues	Ongoing series	August 1947 – March 1952		Avon Comics	Based on the eponymous character created by Leslie Charteris.	No
The Scottish Chiefs	Classics Illustrated #67	1 issue	Main feature	January 1950	John O'Rourke	Gilberton Company, Inc.	Adaptations of the eponymous 1810 novel by Jane Porter.	No
The Sea-Wolf	Classics Illustrated #85: "Sea Wolf"	1 issue	Main feature	July 1951	John O'Rourke	Gilberton Company, Inc.	Adaptation of the eponymous 1904 novel by Jack London.	No
Sexton Blake	Knockout #1–771: "Sexton Blake"	771 installments	Ongoing feature, serialised storyline	March 4, 1939 – December 5, 1953		Amalgamated Press		
The Shadow	Batman (volume 1) #253, 259	2 issues	Main feature	November 1973, November–December 1974	Denny O'Neil	DC Comics	The Shadow was featured in two major stories apart in this series, both of which marked the first and second overall crossovers with the book's main star Batman; The first story "Who Knows What Evil--?" is the main feature in #253 and the second tale "The Night of the Shadow!" is the feature story in #259.	
The Shadow	The Shadow/Green Hornet: Dark Nights	5 issues	Limited series	July – November 2013	Michael Uslan	Dynamite Entertainment	Crossover with the Green Hornet.	Paperback: 9781606904701
The Shadow	The Shadow Over Innsmouth	1 issue	One-shot	July 2014	Ron Marz	Dynamite Entertainment	Crossover adaptation of the 1936 novella by H. P. Lovecraft.	
The Shadow	The Shadow: The Death of Margo Lane	5 issues	Limited series	June – October 2016	Matt Wagner	Dynamite Entertainment		Hardcover: 1524101990 / 9781524101992; Paperback: 1524105139 / 9781524105136
The Shadow	Batman/The Shadow: The Murder Geniuses	6 issues	Limited series	June – November 2017	Scott Snyder, Steve Orlando	DC Comics/Dynamite Entertainment	Third overall crossover with Batman and the first comic book crossover.	Hardcover: 1401275273 / 9781401275273; Paperback: 1401285619 / 9781401285616
The Shadow	The Shadow/Batman	6 issues	Limited series	October 2017 – March 2018	Steve Orlando	DC Comics/Dynamite Entertainment	Fourth overall crossover with Batman and the second comic book crossover.	Hardcover: 9781524106270
Shaft	Shaft	6 issues	Limited series	December 2014 – May 2015	David Walker	Dynamite Entertainment		Vol. 1: A Complicated Man TP (1606907573 / 9781606907573); Vol. 2: Imitation of Life TP (1524102601 / 9781524102609)
Shaft	Shaft: Imitation of Life	4 issues	Limited series	February – May 2016	David Walker	Dynamite Entertainment		Vol. 1: A Complicated Man TP (1606907573 / 9781606907573); Vol. 2: Imitation of Life TP (1524102601 / 9781524102609)
Sherlock Holmes	Classic Comics #21: "The Sign of the Four"	2 issues	Main feature	July 1944	Dan Levin	Gilberton Company, Inc.	Adaptation of the eponymous 1890 novel.	No
Sherlock Holmes	Classic Classics #33: "The Adventures of Sherlock Holmes"	2 issues	Main feature, back-up feature	January 1947	?	Gilberton Company, Inc.	Truncated adaptation of A Study in Scarlet (1887) and full adaptation of The Hound of the Baskervilles (1902).	No
Sherlock Holmes	Classics Illustrated #110: "A Study in Scarlet"	1 issue	Main feature	August 1953	Ken Fitch	Gilberton Company, Inc.	Adaptation of the eponymous first novel.	No
Sherlock Holmes	Sherlock Holmes (1956)	2 issues	Ongoing series	October 1955 – March 1956		Charlton Comics		No
Sherlock Holmes	Four Color (volume 2) #1169, 1245: "New Adventures of Sherlock Holmes"	2 issues	One-shot	March–May 1961, November 1961-January 1962	Paul S. Newman	Dell Comics	Tryout issues for a possible ongoing series that went unpublished.	No
Sherlock Holmes	Now Age Books Illustrated #64-1379: "The Great Adventures of Sherlock Holmes"	1 volume	Graphic novel	January 1974	Kin Platt (credited as Nick Tall)	Pendulum Press		Paperback: ISBN 0883011379
Sherlock Holmes	Sherlock Holmes (1975)	1 issue	Ongoing series (planned)	DC Comics	Denny O'Neil	September–October 1975	Adaptations of "The Final Problem" (1893) and "The Adventure of the Empty House" (1903), both run for nine pages total.	No
Sherlock Holmes	The Rook Magazine #13–14: "A Study in Scarlet"	2 issues	Main feature, serialised storyline	February – April 1982	Jim Stenstrum	Warren Publishing	Two-part adaptation of eponymous first novel. The complete edition, published in June 1989 by Innovation Publishing, features a bonus comic story "The Singular Case of the Anemic Heir" written by William Bryan Dubay and Kevin Duane with art by Anton Caravan, as well as supplementary material including a gallery of Sherlock Holmes artwork.	Sherlock Holmes: Sir Arthur Conan Doyle's A Study in Scarlet TP
Sherlock Holmes	Cases of Sherlock Holmes	20 issues	Ongoing series	May 1986 – 1990		Renegade Press, Northstar Comics	Originally published by Renegade for the first 15 issues, and later by Northstar for the final five issues.	
Sherlock Holmes	Scarlet in Gaslight	4 issues	Limited series	November 1987 – May 1989	Martin Powell	Eternity Comics		Paperback: 0944735096 / 9780944735091
Sherlock Holmes	Sherlock Holmes (1988)	23 issues	Ongoing series	June 1988 – May 1990	Edith Meiser	Eternity Comics		
Sherlock Holmes	Sherlock Holmes of the '30's	7 issues	Limited series	January – July 1990	Leo O'Merlia	Eternity Comics		
Sherlock Holmes	Sherlock Holmes in the Case of the Missing Martian	4 issues	Limited series	July – October 1990	Doug Murray	Eternity Comics	Crossover with the Martians from H. G. Wells' The War of the Worlds (1898).	
Sherlock Holmes	Sherlock Holmes: Chronicles of Crime and Mystery	1 issue	One-shot	February 1992		Northstar Comics		No
Sherlock Holmes	Sherlock Holmes: Tales of Mystery and Suspense	3 issues	Limited series	August 1992 – March 1993	Joe Gentile	Northstar Comics		No
Sherlock Holmes	Sherlock Holmes: Return of the Devil	2 issues	Limited series	September – October 1992	Martin Powell	Adventure Publications	Reprinted in complete form as a single 48-page one-shot by Caliber Comics through its Tome Press imprint.	No
Sherlock Holmes	Sherlock Holmes: Adventure of the Opera Ghost	2 issues	Limited series	1994	Steven Phillip Jones	Caliber Comics		No
Sherlock Holmes	Sherlock Holmes: Soul of the Dragon	1 issue	Graphic novel	December 1995	Joe Gentile	Northstar Comics		No
Sherlock Holmes	The Sussex Vampire	1 issue	One-shot	1996	Warren Ellis	Caliber Press	Adaptation of "The Adventure of the Sussex Vampire" (1924).	No
Sherlock Holmes	Sherlock Holmes Mysteries	1 issue	One-shot	November 1997	Joe Gentile	Moonstone Books		No
Sherlock Holmes	Sherlock Holmes: Dr. Jekyll & Mr. Holmes	1 issue	One-shot	1998	Steven Phillip Jones	Caliber Comics, Tome Press		No
Sherlock Holmes	Sherlock Holmes and the Clown Prince of London	1 issue	One-shot	November 2001	Joe Gentile	Moonstone Books		No
Sherlock Holmes	Sherlock Holmes & Kolchak: The Night Stalker	3 issues	Limited series	March – August 2009	Joe Gentile	Moonstone Books	Crossover with Kolchak: The Night Stalker.	
Sherlock Holmes	Sherlock Holmes (2009)	5 issues	Limited series	April – September 2009	Leah Moore, John Reppion	Dynamite Entertainment		Hardcover: 1606900587 / 9781606900581; Paperback: 1606900595 / 9781606900598
Sherlock Holmes	Victorian Undead: Sherlock Holmes vs. Zombies	6 issues	Limited series	January – June 2010		DC Comics/Wildstorm		
Sherlock Holmes	Victorian Undead Special: Sherlock Holmes vs. Jekyll/Hyde	1 issue	One-shot	December 2010		DC Comics/Wildstorm		
Sherlock Holmes	Victorian Undead II: Sherlock Holmes vs. Dracula	5 issues	Limited series	January – May 2011		DC Comics/Wildstorm		
Sherlock Holmes	Sherlock Holmes: Year One	6 issues	Limited series	February – September 2011	Scott Beatty	Dynamite Entertainment		Paperback: 1606902172 / 9781606902172
Sherlock Holmes	Sherlock Holmes: Victorian Knights	5 issues	Limited series	December 2011 – April 2012, November 2013	Ken Janssens	TidalWave Productions	Four regular issues and an issue #0.	Paperback: 1954044887 / 9781954044883
Sherlock Holmes	Sherlock Holmes: The Liverpool Demon	5 issues	Limited series	December 2012 – June 2013	Leah Moore, John Reppion	Dynamite Entertainment		Paperback: 9781606904367
Sherlock Holmes	Domino Lady/Sherlock Holmes	2 issues	Limited series	June – September 2013	Nancy Holder	Moonstone Books	Crossover with Domino Lady.	
Sherlock Holmes	Sherlock Holmes: Moriarty Lives	5 issues	Limited series	December 2013 – July 2014	David Liss	Dynamite Entertainment		Paperback: 9781606908259
Sherlock Holmes	Sherlock Holmes vs. Harry Houdini	5 issues	Limited series	October 2014 – April 2015	Anthony Del, Conor McCreery	Dynamite Entertainment		Paperback: 9781606906965
Sherlock Holmes	Sherlock Holmes: Murder at the Cabaret	1 volume	Graphic novel	May 18, 2016	Gary Reed	Caliber Press		Paperback: ISBN 1635293928 / ISBN 9781635293920
Sherlock Holmes	Sherlock Holmes: The Vanishing Man	4 issues	Limited series	May – August 2018	Leah Moore, John Reppion	Dynamite Entertainment		Paperback: 9781524107819
The Shrinking Man	The Shrinking Man	4 issues	Limited series	July – October 2015	Ted Adams	IDW Publishing	Adaptarion of the eponymous 1956 novel by Richard Matheson.	
Shutter Island	Shutter Island	1 volume	Graphic novel	May 2008	Christian De Metter	Casterman		Hardcover: ISBN 9782203007758
Silas Marner	Classics Illustrated #55	1 issue	Main feature	January 1949	Harry Miller	Gilberton Company, Inc.	Adaptations of the eponymous 1861 novel.	No
Silvertip	Four Color (volume 2) #491: "Silvertip"	9 issues	One-shot	August 1953	?	Dell Comics	Adaptation of the first novel.	No
Silvertip	Four Color (volume 2) #572: "Silvertip's Search"	9 issues	One-shot	July 1954	?	Dell Comics	Adaptation of the eighth novel.	No
Silvertip	Four Color (volume 2) #608: "Silvertip and the Valley of Vanishing Men"	9 issues	One-shot	December 1954	?	Dell Comics	Adaptation of the twelfth novel.	No
Silvertip	Four Color (volume 2) #637: "Silvertip's Roundup"	9 issues	One-shot	July 1955	?	Dell Comics	Adaptation of the fourth novel.	No
Silvertip	Four Color (volume 2) #667: "Silvertip and the Stolen Stallion"	9 issues	One-shot	December 1955	?	Dell Comics	Adaptation of the ninth novel.	No
Silvertip	Four Color (volume 2) #731: "Silvertip and the Fighting Four"	9 issues	One-shot	October 1956	?	Dell Comics	Adaptation of the sixth novel.	No
Silvertip	Four Color (volume 2) #789: "Silvertip and the Valley Thieves"	9 issues	One-shot	April 1957	?	Dell Comics	Adaptation of the tenth novel	No
Silvertip	Four Color (volume 2) #835: "Silvertip – The False Rider"	9 issues	One-shot	September 1957	?	Dell Comics	Adaptation of the thirteenth novel.	No
Silvertip	Four Color (volume 2) #898: "Silvertip's Trap"	9 issues	One-shot	May 1958	?	Dell Comics	Adaptation of the fifth novel.	No
"The Small Assassin"	Shock SuspenStories #7	1 issue	Back-up feature	February–March 1953	Albert B. Feldstein	EC Comics	Adaptation of the eponymous 1946 short story by Ray Bradbury.	
A Song of Ice and Fire	A Game of Thrones	24 issues	Limited series	September 2011 – February 2015	George R.R. Martin, Daniel Abraham	Dynamite Entertainment	Adaptation of the eponymous first novel.	Volume One HC (0007482892 / 9780007482894); Volume Two HC (000757858X / 9780007578580); Volume Three HC (000757858X / 9780007578580); Volume Four HC (0008132208 / 9780008132200)
A Song of Ice and Fire	A Clash of Kings	16 issues	Limited series	June 2017 – March 2019	George R. R. Martin, Landry Quinn Walker	Dynamite Entertainment	Two-part adaptation of the eponymous second novel.	Volume One HC (0008322139 / 9780008322137); Volume Two HC (0008322155 / 9780008322151); Volume Three HC (0008322171 / 9780008322175); Volume Four HC (0008647224 / 9780008647223)
A Song of Ice and Fire	A Clash of Kings Part II	16 issues	Limited series	January 2020 – November 2021	George R. R. Martin, Landry Quinn Walker	Dynamite Entertainment	Two-part adaptation of the eponymous second novel.	Volume One HC (0008322139 / 9780008322137); Volume Two HC (0008322155 / 9780008322151); Volume Three HC (0008322171 / 9780008322175); Volume Four HC (0008647224 / 9780008647223)
"A Sound of Thunder"	Weird Science-Fantasy #25	1 issue	Back-up feature	September 1954	Albert B. Feldstein	EC Comics	Adaptation of the eponymous 1952 short story by Ray Bradbury.	
The Spy	Classics Illustrated #51	1 issue	Main feature	September 1948	?	Gilberton Company, Inc.	Adaptation of the eponymous 1821 novel by James Fenimore Cooper.	No
The Stainless Steel Rat	2000 AD #140–151: "The Stainless Steel Rat"	12 issues	Serialised storyline	November 1979 – February 1980	Kelvin Gosnell	IPC Magazines; Fleetway Publications	Adaptation of the first novel.	
The Stainless Steel Rat	2000 AD #166–177: "The Stainless Steel Rat Saves the World"	12 issues	Serialised storyline	June – September 1980	Kelvin Gosnell	IPC Magazines; Fleetway Publications	Adaptation of the third novel.	
The Stainless Steel Rat	2000 AD #393–404: "The Stainless Steel Rat for President"	12 issues	Serialised storyline	November 1984 – February 1985	Kelvin Gosnell	IPC Magazines; Fleetway Publications	Adaptation of the fifth novel.	
The Stand (comics)	The Stand: Captain Trips	5 issues	Limited series	December 2008 – March 2009		Marvel Comics		
The Stand (comics)	The Stand: American Nightmares	5 issues	Limited series	May – October 2009		Marvel Comics		
The Stand (comics)	The Stand: Soul Survivors	5 issues	Limited series	December 2009 – May 2010		Marvel Comics		
The Stand (comics)	The Stand: Hardcases	5 issues	Limited series	August 2010 – January 2011		Marvel Comics		
The Stand (comics)	The Stand: No Man's Land	5 issues	Limited series	April – August 2011		Marvel Comics		
The Stand (comics)	The Stand: Night Has Come	6 issues	Limited series	October 2011 – March 2012		Marvel Comics		
Star Wars Legends	Star Wars: Heir to the Empire	6 issues	Limited series	October 1995 – April 1996	Mike Baron	Dark Horse Comics	Adaptation of the first book in the Thrawn trilogy.	
Star Wars Legends	Star Wars: Splinter of the Mind's Eye	4 issues	Limited series	December 1995 – June 1996	Terry Austin	Dark Horse Comics	Adaptation of the eponymous 1978 novel by Alan Dean Foster.	
Star Wars Legends	Star Wars: Shadows of the Empire	6 issues	Limited series	May – October 1996	John Wagner	Dark Horse Comics	Adaptation of the eponymous 1996 novel by Steve Perry, the basis of the multimedia event of the same title it started.	
Star Wars Legends	Star Wars: Dark Force Rising	6 issues	Limited series	May – October 1997	Mike Baron	Dark Horse Comics	Adaptation of the second book in the Thrawn trilogy.	
Star Wars Legends	Star Wars: The Last Command	6 issues	Limited series	November 1997 – July 1998	Mike Baron	Dark Horse Comics	Adaptation of the third book in the Thrawn trilogy.	
Star Wars Legends	Star Wars: Shadows of the Empire: Evolution	5 issues	Limited series	February – June 1998	Steve Perry	Dark Horse Comics	Sequel to Shadows of the Empire.	
Strange Case of Dr Jekyll and Mr Hyde	Classic Comics #13	1 issue	Main feature	August 1943	Robert Louis Stevenson (novella), Evelyn Goodman (adaptation)	Pendulum Press	Fifty-three pages total; art by Arnold Hicks.	No
Strange Case of Dr Jekyll and Mr Hyde	A Star Presentation #3	1 issue	Main feature	May 1950	Robert Louis Stevenson (novella)	Hero Books Inc.	Twenty-six pages total; art by Wally Wood. No credits on story though.	No
Strange Case of Dr Jekyll and Mr Hyde	Nightmare Annual #1	1 issue	Main feature	1972	Robert Louis Stevenson (novella), Al Hewetson (adaptation)	Skywald Publications	Ten pages total; art by Xirinius.	No
Strange Case of Dr Jekyll and Mr Hyde	Now Age Books Illustrated #64-0968	1 volume	Graphic novel	1973	Robert Louis Stevenson (novella), Kin Platt (adaptation)	Pendulum Press	Fifty-six pages total; art by Nestor Redondo.	No
Strange Case of Dr Jekyll and Mr Hyde	Supernatural Thrillers #4	1 issue	Main feature	June 1973	Robert Louis Stevenson (novella), Ron Goulart (adaptation)	Marvel Comics	Twenty pages total; art by Win Mortimer.	No
The Swiss Family Robinson	Classics Illustrated #42	1 issue	Main feature	October 1947	Elspeth Campbell	Gilberton Company, Inc.		No
The Swiss Family Robinson	Joyas Literarias Juveniles #23: "El Robinson suizo"	1 issue	Main feature	1971	José Antonio Vidal Sales	Editorial Bruguera, S.A.	Later adapted to English by Marion Kimberly and published by King Features as the fifth volume in the King Classics series in 1977.	No
The Swiss Family Robinson	Now Age Books Illustrated #64-3231	1 volume	Graphic novel	1978	Naunerle Farr	Pendulum Press		Paperback: 0883013231
The Swiss Family Robinson	Classic Comics: Swiss Family Robinson	1 volume	Graphic novel	January 1990	Dr. Marion Kimberly	Hawk Books		Hardcover: ISBN 0948248033 / ISBN 9780948248030
The Swiss Family Robinson	The Swiss Family Robinson (2011)	1 volume	Graphic novel	February 15, 2011	Richard Blandford	Campfire		Paperback: ISBN 9380028474 / ISBN 9789380028477

== T ==
Basis	Title	Length	Format	Publication date	Authors	Publisher	Notes	Collected editions
A Tale of Two Cities	Classic Comics #6	1 issue	Main feature	October 1942	Evelyn Goodman	Gilberton Company, Inc.		No
The Tales of Alvin Maker	Red Prophet: The Tales of Alvin Maker	12 issues	Limited series	March 2006 – March 2008	Orson Scott Card (novel), Roland Bernard Brown (adaptation)	Dabel Brothers Productions	Adaptation of the eponymous second novel.	
Tales of Dunk and Egg	The Hedge Knight	6 issues	Limited series	August 2003 – April 2003	Ben Avery	Image Comics/Devil's Due Publishing		
Tales of Dunk and Egg	The Hedge Knight II: Sworn Sword	6 issues	Limited series	June 2007 – June 2008	Ben Avery	Marvel Comics		
Tales of Dunk and Egg	The Mystery Knight: A Graphic Novel	1 issue	Graphic novel	August 2017	Ben Avery	Bantam Books		
The Talisman	Classics Illustrated #111	1 issue	Main feature	September 1953	Kenneth W. Fitch	Gilberton Company, Inc.		
Tarrano the Conqueror	Attack on Planet Mars	1 issue	One-shot	1951	Ray Cummings (novel)	Avon Comics	Presented in four chapters: "Tarrano Strikes" (eight pages), "Princess of the Electronized Tower" (seven pages), "Fugitives from the Warlord" (five pages) and "Attack on Mars" (seven pages). Twenty-six pages total; art by Carmine Infantino, Joe Kubert and Vince Alascia.	No
Tarzan (comics)	Four Color (series 2) #134: "Tarzan and the Devil Ogre"	2 issues	One-shot	February 1947	Robert P. Thompson	Dell Comics	The first two issues are tryout issues for the eventual series, both published apart from each other.	
Tarzan (comics)	Four Color (series 2) #161: "Tarzan and the Fires of Tohr"	2 issues	One-shot	August 1947	Robert P. Thompson	Dell Comics	The first two issues are tryout issues for the eventual series, both published apart from each other.	
Tarzan (comics)	Tarzan (1948)	258 issues	Ongoing series	January–February 1948 – February 1977		Dell Comics (1948–1962), Gold Key Comics (1962–1972), DC Comics (1972–1977)	Main ongoing series went through three different publishers in its first run, Dell from #1 (January–February 1948) to #131 (July–August 1962), Gold Key from #132 (November 1962) to #206 (February 1972) and by DC from #207 (April 1972) to #258 (February 1977); book retitled Tarzan of the Apes from #138 (October 1963) which remained as the comic's title until the series' end.	
Tarzan (comics)	Korak, Son of Tarzan	59 issues	Ongoing series	January 1964 – September–October 1975		Gold Key Comics (1964–1972), DC Comics (1972–1975)	Main ongoing series went through two different publishers in its first run, Gold Key from #1 (January 1964) to #45 (January 1972) and by DC from #46 (June 1972) to #59 (September–October 1975).	
Tarzan (comics)	Jungle Tales of Tarzan	4 issues	Limited series	December 1964 – July 1965	Joe Gill	Charlton Comics	Unauthorised adaptation of the 1919 short story collection, adapted from eight of the twelve stories featured in the collection.	
Tarzan (comics)	Tarzan Family #60–66	7 issues	Ongoing series	November–December 1975 – November–December 1976		DC Comics	Continuation of the issue number of Korak, Son of Tarzan from #59.	
Tarzan (comics)	Tarzan, Lord of the Jungle	29 issues	Ongoing series	June 1977 – October 1979		Marvel Comics		
Tarzan (comics)	Tarzan of the Apes	2 issues	Limited series	July – August 1984	Sharman DiVono, Mark Evenier	Marvel Comics	First published as Marvel Comics Super Special #29 earlier in July 1984.	
Tarzan (comics)	Tarzan the Warrior	5 issues	Limited series	March – August 1992	Mark Wheatley	Malibu Comics		
Tarzan (comics)	Tarzan: Love, Lies and the Lost City	3 issues	Limited series	August – October 1992	Henning Kure, Matt Wagner, Walt Simonson	Malibu Comics		
Tarzan (comics)	Tarzan: The Beckoning	7 issues	Limited series	November 1992 – June 1993	Thomas Yeates, Henning Kure	Malibu Comics		
Tarzan (comics)	Tarzan: A Tale of Mugambi	1 issue	One-shot	June 1995	Darko Macan	Dark Horse Comics		
Tarzan (comics)	Tarzan/John Carter: Warlords of Mars	4 issues	Limited series	January – June 1996	Bruce Jones	Dark Horse Comics	First comic book crossover with John Carter of Mars.	
Tarzan (comics)	Tarzan vs. Predator at the Earth's Core	4 issues	Limited series	January – June 1996	Walter Simonson	Dark Horse Comics	Crossover with Predator.	
Tarzan (comics)	Tarzan (1996)	20 issues	Ongoing series	July 1996 – March 1998	Bruce Jones (#1–6), Allan Gross (#7–10), Lovern Kindzierski (#11–16), Tim Trueman (17–20)	Dark Horse Comics	Six storylines spanned through twenty issues of this series, "Tarzan's Jungle Fury" (4 issues), "Legion of Hate" (4 issues), "Le Monstre" (2 issues), "The Modern Prometheus" (2 issues), "Tooth and Nail" (2 issues) and "Tarzan vs. the Moon Men" (4 issues).	
Tarzan (comics)	The Return of Tarzan	3 issues	Limited series	April – June 1997	Thomas Yeates	Dark Horse Comics		
Tarzan (comics)	Tarzan/Carson of Venus	4 issues	Limited series	May – August 1998	Darko Macan	Dark Horse Comics	Crossover with Carson Napier.	
Tarzan (comics)	Tarzan: The Savage Heart	4 issues	Limited series	April – July 1999		Dark Horse Comics		
Tarzan (comics)	Batman/Tarzan: Claws of the Cat-Woman	4 issues	Limited series	September – December 1999	Ron Marz	DC Comics, Dark Horse Comics	Crossover with Batman.	
Tarzan (comics)	Tarzan: The Rivers of Blood	4 issues	Limited series	November 1999 – February 2000		Dark Horse Comics		
Tarzan (comics)	Superman/Tarzan: Sons of the Jungle	3 issues	Limited series	October 2001 – May 2002	Chuck Dixon	DC Comics, Dark Horse Comics	Crossover with Superman.	
Tarzan (comics)	Lord of the Jungle (series 1)	15 issues	Ongoing series	January 2012 – May 2013	Arvid Nelson	Dynamite Entertainment		
Tarzan (comics)	The Once & Future Tarzan	1 issue	One-shot	November 2012	Alan Gordon, Tom Yeates	Dark Horse Comics		
Tarzan (comics)	Lords of Mars	6 issues	Limited series	August 2013 – January 2014	Arvid Nelson	Dynamite Entertainment	Second comic book crossover with John Carter of Mars.	
Tarzan (comics)	Lords of the Jungle	6 issues	Limited series	March – August 2016	Corinna Bechko	Dynamite Entertainment	Crossover with Sheena, Queen of the Jungle.	
Tarzan (comics)	Tarzan on the Planet of the Apes	6 issues	Limited series	September 2016 – January 2017	Tim Seeley, David Walker	Dark Horse Comics, Boom! Studios	Crossover with Planet of the Apes.	
Tarzan (comics)	The Greatest Adventure	9 issues	Limited series	April 2017 – February 2018	Bill Willingham	Dynamite Entertainment		
Tarzan (comics)	Red Sonja/Tarzan	6 issues	Limited series	May – December 2018	Gail Simone	Dynamite Entertainment	Crossover with Red Sonja.	
Tarzan (comics)	Groo Meets Tarzan	4 issues	Limited series	July – November 2021	Mark Evanier, Sergio Aragones	Dark Horse Comics	Crossover with Groo the Wanderer.	
Tarzan (comics)	Lord of the Jungle (series 2)	6 issues	Limited series	November 2022 – present	Dan Jurgens	Dynamite Entertainment		
TekWar	TekWorld	24 issues	Ongoing series	September 1992 – August 1994	Ron Goulart, Evan Skolnick, Mariano Nicieza	Marvel Comics/Epic Comics		
TekWar	William Shatner Presents: The Tek War Chronicles	8 issues	Limited series	June – December 2009		TidalWave Productions		
"The Terrible Old Man"	Tower of Shadows #3	1 issue	Main feature	January 1970	H. P. Lovecraft (short story), Roy Thomas (adaptation)	Marvel Comics	Seven pages total; art by Barry Windsor-Smith, Dan Adkins (pages 1-2) and John Verpoorten (pages 3-7).	No
The Thief of Always	Clive Barker's The Thief of Always	3 issues	Limited series	January – May 2005	Kris Oprisko	IDW Publishing		
"The Thing on the Roof"	Chamber of Chills #2	1 issue	Main feature	March 1973	Robert E. Howard (short story), Roy Thomas (adaptation)	Marvel Comics	Eight pages total; art and colors by Frank Brunner.	No
"Thor Meets Captain America"	The Life Eaters	1 volume	Graphic novel	October 2003	David Brin	WildStorm	Adapted by the author from his eponymous 1986 novelette, originally first published in the July 1986 issue of The Magazine of Fantasy and Science Fiction.	
The Three Musketeers	Classic Comics #1	1 issue	Main feature	October 1941	Malcolm Kildale	Gilberton Company, Inc.		No
The Three Musketeers	Now Age Books	1 volume	Graphic novel	1974		Pendulum Press		
The Three Musketeers	The Three Musketeers (1988)	3 issues	Limited series	December 1988 – April 1989		Eternity Comics		
The Three Musketeers	Classic Comics: The Three Musketeers	1 volume	Graphic novel	January 1990	Dr. Marion Kimberly	Gallery Books		
The Three Musketeers	The Three Musketeers (2008)	6 issues	Limited series	August 2008 – January 2009	Roy Thomas	Marvel Comics		
The Three Musketeers	The 3 Musketeers (2011)	1 volume	Graphic novel	April 2011	Bruce Buchanan	Campfire Classics		
The Three Musketeers	Graphic Classics: The Three Musketeers	1 volume	Graphic novel	October 2008	Jim Pipe	Barron's		
The Time Machine	Classics Illustrated #133	1 issue	Main feature	July 1956	Lorenz Graham	Gilberton Company, Inc.		No
The Time Machine	Now Age Books	1 volume	Graphic novel	June 1973	Otto Binder	Pendulum Press		
The Time Machine	The Time Machine (1990)	3 issues	Limited series	April – May 1990	Bill Spangler	Eternity Comics		No
The Time Machine	The Time Machine (2010)	1 volume	Graphic novel	September 2010	Lewis Helfand	Campfire Classics		
The Time Machine	The Time Machine (2018)	1 volume	Graphic novel	April 2018	Dobbs	Insight Comics		
Toilers of the Sea	Classics Illustrated #56: "The Toilers of the Sea"	1 issue	Main feature	February 1949	Harry G. Miller (as "Harry Glickman")	Gilberton Company, Inc.		No
Tom Brown's School Days	Classics Illustrated #45	1 issue	Main feature	January 1948	?	Gilberton Company, Inc.		No
Treasure Island	Classics Illustrated #64	1 issue	Main feature	October 1949	Ken Fitch	Gilberton Company, Inc.		No
Treasure Island	Robert Louis Stevenson's Treasure Island (2007)	1 volume	Graphic novel	2007	Wim Coleman, Pat Perrin	Stone Arch Books		
Treasure Island	Treasure Island (2007)	6 issues	Limited series	August 2007 – January 2008	Roy Thomas	Marvel Comics		
Twenty Thousand Leagues Under the Seas	Classics Illustrated #47: "Twenty Thousand Leagues Under the Sea"	1 issue	Main feature	May 1948	?	Gilberton Company, Inc.		No
Twenty Years After	Classics Illustrated #41	1 issue	Main feature	September 1947	Harry G. Miller	Gilberton Company, Inc.		No
Twilight	Twilight: The Graphic Novel	2 volumes	Graphic novels	March 2010 – October 2011	Young Kim	Yen Press	Adaptation of the first novel.	
Twilight	New Moon: The Graphic Novel	1 volume	Graphic novel	April 2013	Young Kim	Yen Press	Adaptation of the second novel.	
Two Years Before the Mast	Classics Illustrated #25	1 issue	Main feature	October 1945	Ruth Roche	Gilberton Company, Inc.		No
Typee	Classics Illustrated #36	1 issue	Main feature	April 1947	Harry G. Miller	Gilberton Company, Inc.		No

== U ==
Basis	Title	Length	Format	Publication date	Authors	Publisher	Notes	Collected editions
Uncle Tom's Cabin	Classic Comics #15	1 issue	One-shot	November 1943	Harriet Beecher Stowe (novel), Evelyn Goodman (adaptation)	Gilberton Company, Inc.	Fifty-one pages total; art by R. H. Livingstone.	No
Under Two Flags	Classics Illustrated #86	1 issue	Main feature	August 1951	Ouida (novel), Ken Fitch (adaptation)	Gilberton Company, Inc.	Forty-four pages total; art by Maurice Del Bourgo and John Bulthuis.	No

== V ==
Basis	Title	Length	Format	Publication date	Authors	Publisher	Notes	Collected editions
"The Valley of the Worm"	Supernatural Thrillers #3	1 issue	Main feature	April 1973	Robert E. Howard (short story), Roy Thomas (adaptation), Gerry Conway (adaptation)	Marvel Comics	Twenty-one pages total; art by Gil Kane and Ernie Chan with colors by Glynis Oliver.	No
"The Valley of the Worm"	Bloodstar	1 volume	Graphic novel	1976	Robert E. Howard (short story), John Jakes (adaptation), John Pocsik (adaptation)	The Morning Star Press		No
The Vampire Chronicles	Anne Rice's The Vampire Lestat	12 issues	Limited series	January 1989 – August 1991	Faye Perozich	Innovation Publishing		
The Vampire Chronicles	Anne Rice's Interview with the Vampire	12 issues	Limited series	August 1991 – January 1994	Cynthy J. Wood, Faye Perozich	Innovation Publishing		
The Vampire Chronicles	Anne Rice's The Queen of the Damned	11 issues	Limited series	October 1991 – December 1993		Innovation Publishing	Adaptation of the third installment in the series.	
The Vampire Chronicles	Interview with the Vampire: Claudia's Story	1 volume	OEL manga	November 2012	Ashley Witter	Yen Comics		
Vampire Hunter D	Hideyuki Kikuchi's Vampire Hunter D (バンパイアハンターD)	8 volumes	Serialized manga	November 2007 – September 2014	Hideyuki Kikuchi (author), Saiko Takaki (illustrator)	Media Factory	Serialized in Monthly Comic Flapper.	
"The Vampyre"	Vampire Tales #1	1 issue	Main feature	August 1973	John William Polidori (short story), Ron Goulart (adaptation), Roy Thomas (adaptation)	Marvel Comics	Thirteen pages total; art by Win Mortimer.	No
The Virginian	Classics Illustrated #150	1 issue	One-shot	May 1959	?	Gilberton Company, Inc.		

== W ==
Based on	Title	Length	Format	Publication date	Authors	Publisher	Notes	Collected editions
The War of the Worlds	Classics Illustrated #124	1 issue	Main feature	January 1955	H. G. Wells (novel), Harry Miller (adaptation)	Gilberton Company, Inc.	Forty-five pages total; art by Lou Cameron.	No
The War of the Worlds	The War of the Worlds (1974)	1 volume	Graphic novel	1974	H. G. Wells (novel), Naunerle Farr (adaptation)	Pendulum Press	Fifty-six pages total; art by Alex Niño.	Paperback: 0883011360 / 9780883011362
The War of the Worlds	Amazing Adventures (1970) #18–39	21 issues	Main feature (part of an ongoing series)	May 1973 – November 1976	Roy Thomas, Neal Adams, Gerry Conway, Howard Chaykin, Don McGregor (#21–39)	Marvel Comics		
The War of the Worlds	Marvel Classics Comics #14	1 issue	Main feature	January 1976	H. G. Wells (novel), Chris Claremont	Marvel Comics	Forty-eight pages total; art by Yong Montaño and Amado Castrillo with colors by Bonnie Wilford.	No
The War of the Worlds	War of the Worlds (1990)	6 issues	Limited series	1988 – 1990	H. G. Wells (novel), Scott Finley	Eternity Comics		Book One: The Invasion Begins TP (0944735339/978-0944735336)
The War of the Worlds	The War of the Worlds (1996)	5 issues	Limited series	1996	H. G. Wells (novel), Randy Zimmerman	Caliber Press		Haven and the Hellweed TP (0972027106/9780972027106); Infestation TP (1942351968/9781942351962)
The War of the Worlds	The War of the Worlds: The Memphis Front	2 issues	Limited series	1998	H. G. Wells (novel), Randy Zimmerman	Arrow Comics		No
The War of the Worlds	Superman: War of the Worlds	1 issue	One-shot	October 1999	Roy Thomas	DC Comics	An Elseworlds story retelling the plot of H. G. Wells' novel set in 1938, with Superman featured in the narrative fighting against the Martians. Sixty-four pages total; art by Michael Lark with colors by Noelle Giddings and Heroic Age.	Paperback: 1563893967 / 9781563893964
The War of the Worlds	War of the Worlds (2005)	1 volume	Graphic novel	March 2005	H. G. Wells (novel), Stephen Stern (adaptation)	Best Sellers Illustrated	Kid-friendly adaptation set in contemporary United States. 185 pages total; art by Arne Starr.	Paperback: 0976475502 / 9780976475507
The War of the Worlds	Little Book of Horror: War of the Worlds	1 volume	Graphic novel	July 27, 2005	H. G. Wells (novel), Steve Niles (adaptation)	IDW Publishing	Art and colors by Ted McKeever.	Hardcover: 1-933239-37-9 / 9781933239378
The War of the Worlds	H. G. Wells' The War of the Worlds	1 volume	Graphic novel	April 19, 2006	H. G. Wells (novel), Ian Edginton (adaptation)	Dark Horse Comics	Sixty-seven pages total; art and colors by Matt Brooker.	Hardcover: 1593074743 / 9781593074746
The War of the Worlds	War of the Worlds: Second Wave	6 issues	Limited series	March – September 2006	Michael Alan Nelson	Boom! Studios		Paperback: 1934506060 / 9781934506066
The War of the Worlds	The War of the Worlds (2008)	1 volume	Graphic novel	September 2008	H. G. Wells (novel), Davis Worth Miller (adaptation), Katherine McLean Brevard (adaptation)	Stone Arch Books	Eighty pages total; art by Tod G. Smith and Jose Alfonso Ocampo Ruiz.	1434208532 / 9781434208538
The War of the Worlds	The War of the Worlds (2011)	1 volume	Graphic novel	July 5, 2011	H. G. Wells (novel), Ryan Foley (adaptation)	Campfire	Art by Bhupendra Ahluwalia.	Paperback: 9380028601 / 9789380028606
The War of the Worlds	H. G. Wells: The War of the Worlds	1 volume	Graphic novel	January 30, 2018	H. G. Wells (novel), Dobbs (adaptation)	Insight Comics		Hardcover: ISBN 1683832000 / ISBN 9781683832003
Waterloo	Classics Illustrated #111	1 issue	Main feature	November 1956	Erckmann-Chatrian (novel)	Gilberton Company, Inc.	Forty-four pages total; art by Graham Ingels.	No
Westward Ho!	Classic Comics #14	1 issue	Main feature	September 1943	Charles Kingsley (novel), Daniel Kushner (adaptation)	Gilberton Company, Inc.	Fifty pages total; art by Allen Simon.	No
The White Company	Classics Illustrated #102	1 issue	Main feature	December 1952	Arthur Conan Doyle (novel), Ken Fitch (adaptation)	Gilberton Company, Inc.	Forty-four pages total; art by Alex Blum.	No
Who Goes There?	Starstream #1	1 issue	Main feature	1976	John W. Campbell (novella), Arnold Drake (adaptation)	Whitman Publishing	Seventeen pages total; art by Jack Abel.	No
White Fang	Classics Illustrated #80	1 issue	Main feature	February 1951	Jack London (novel), Ken Fitch (adaptation)	Gilberton Company, Inc.	Forty-four pages total; art by Alex Blum.	No
White Fang	Now Age Books Illustrated #64-2715	1 volume	Graphic novel	January 1977	Jack London (novel), Naunerle Farr (adaptation)	Pendulum Press	Fifty-six pages total; art by Fred Carrillo.	Paperback: 0883012839 / 9780883012833
Wild Cards	Wild Cards	4 issues	Limited series	September – December 1990	Lewis Shiner, Melinda Snodgrass, Howard Waldrop, Walton Simon, Walter Jon Williams, Gail Gerstner-Miller, George R.R. Martin, Stephen Leigh	Epic Comics		Paperback: 0871357887 / 9780871357885
Wild Cards	Wild Cards: The Hard Call	6 issues	Limited series	April 2008 – July 2010	Daniel Abraham	Dabel Brothers Productions		Paperback: 1606901583 /9781606901588
Wild Cards	Wild Cards: Drawing of Cards	4 issues	Limited series	September – December 2022	Paul Cornell	Marvel Comics		Paperback: 1302925040 / 9781302925048
Wuthering Heights	Classics Illustrated #59	1 issue	Main feature	May 1949	Emily Brontë (novel), Harry Miller (adaptation)	Gilberton Company, Inc.	Forty-four pages total; art by Henry Kiefer.	No
Wuthering Heights	Now Age Books Illustrated #64-2723	1 volume	Graphic novel	1977	Emily Brontë (novel), Naunerle Farr (adaptation)	Pendulum Press	Fifty-six pages total; art by Jo Amongo.	Paperback: 0-88301-272-3
Wuthering Heights	Classics Illustrated #13	1 issue	Main feature	October 1990	Emily Brontë (novel), Rick Geary (adaptation)	Berkley Books, First Publishing	Forty-five pages total; art and colors by Rick Geary.	No
Wuthering Heights	Wuthering Heights (2011)	1 volume	Graphic novel	August 2011	Seán Michael Wilson	Classical Comics		Paperback: 1906332878 / 978-1906332877
Wyrms	Wyrms	6 issues	Limited series	April 2006 – January 2008	Orson Scott Card, Jake Black	Dabel Brothers Productions, Marvel Comics	Adaptations of the eponymous 1987 novel by Orson Scott Card.	Paperback: 0785126619/9780785126614

== Y ==
Based on	Title	Length	Format	Publication date	Authors	Publisher	Notes	Collected editions
"Yours Truly, Jack the Ripper"	Journey into Mystery (1972) #2	1 issue	Main feature	December 1972	Robert Bloch (short story), Roy Goulart (adaptation)	Marvel Comics	Ten pages total; art by Gil Kane and Ralph Reese.	No
"Yours Truly, Jack the Ripper"	Robert Bloch's Yours Truly, Jack the Ripper	3 issues	Limited series	June – August 2010	Robert Bloch (short story), Joe R. Lansdale (adaptation), John L. Lansdale (adaptation)	IDW Publishing	Art and colors for this adaptation was done by Kevin Colden.	Paperback: 1600107532/978-1600107535

== Z ==
Basis	Title	Length	Format	Publication date	Authors	Publisher	Notes	Collected editions
Zane Grey	Four Color (series 2) #197: "Spirit of the Border"	12 issues	One-shot	September 1948		Dell Comics	First installment in the Zane Grey Picturized Edition series, adapted from the 1906 novel of the same title.	
Zane Grey	Four Color (series 2) #222: "West of the Pecos"	12 issues	One-shot	March 1949		Dell Comics	Adaptation of the 1937 novel of the same title.	
Zane Grey	Four Color (series 2) #230: "Sunset Pass"	12 issues	One-shot	May 1949		Dell Comics	Adaptation of the 1931 novel of the same title.	
Zane Grey	Four Color (series 2) #236: "Heritage of the Desert"	12 issues	One-shot	July 1949		Dell Comics	Adaptation of the 1910 novel of the same title.	
Zane Grey	Four Color (series 2) #246: "Thunder Mountain"	12 issues	One-shot	September 1949		Dell Comics	Adaptation of the 1935 novel of the same title.	
Zane Grey	Four Color (series 2) #255: "The Ranger"	12 issues	One-shot	November 1949		Dell Comics	Adaptation of the novel The Lone Star Ranger (1914).	
Zane Grey	Four Color (series 2) #270: "Drift Fence"	12 issues	One-shot	March 1950		Dell Comics	Adaptation of the 1929 novel of the same title.	
Zane Grey	Four Color (series 2) #301: "The Mysterious Rider"	12 issues	One-shot	November 1950		Dell Comics	Adaptation of the 1921 novel of the same title.	
Zane Grey	Four Color (series 2) #314: "Ambush"	12 issues	One-shot	February 1951		Dell Comics	Adaptation of the novel Western Union (1939).	
Zane Grey	Four Color (series 2) #333: "Wilderness Trek"	12 issues	One-shot	May 1951		Dell Comics	Adaptation of the 1944 novel of the same title.	
Zane Grey	Four Color (series 2) #346: "Hide-Out"	12 issues	One-shot	August 1951		Dell Comics	Adaptations of the novel Wanderer of the Wasteland (1923).	
Zane Grey	Four Color (series 2) #357: "Comeback!"	12 issues	One-shot	November 1951		Dell Comics	Adaptation of the novel The Shepherd of Guadaloupe (1930).	
Zane Grey	Four Color (series 2) #372: "Riders of the Purple Sage"	12 issues	One-shot	February 1952		Dell Comics	Adaptation of the 1912 novel of the same title.	
Zane Grey	Four Color (series 2) #395: "Forlorn River"	12 issues	One-shot	May 1952		Dell Comics	Adaptation of the 1927 novel of the same title.	
Zane Grey	Four Color (series 2) #412: "Nevada"	12 issues	One-shot	August 1952		Dell Comics	Adaptation of the 1928 novel of the same title.	
Zane Grey	Four Color (series 2) #433: "Wildfire"	12 issues	One-shot	October 1952		Dell Comics	Adaptation of the 1917 novel of the same title.	
Zane Grey	Four Color (series 2) #449: "Tappan's Burro"	12 issues	One-shot	February 1953		Dell Comics	Adaptation of the 1923 novel of the same title.	
Zane Grey	Four Color (series 2) #467: "Desert Gold"	12 issues	One-shot	May–July 1953		Dell Comics	Adaptation of the 1913 novel of the same title.	
Zane Grey	Four Color (series 2) #484: "River Feud"	12 issues	One-shot	August–October 1953		Dell Comics	Adaptation of the novel Rogue River Feud (1930).	
Zane Grey	Four Color (series 2) #511: "Outlaw Trail"	12 issues	One-shot	November 1953-January 1954		Dell Comics	Adaptation of the novel The Border Legion (1916).	
Zane Grey	Four Color (series 2) #532: "The Rustlers"	12 issues	One-shot	February–April 1954		Dell Comics	Adaptation of the novel Raiders of Spanish Peaks (1938).	
Zane Grey	Four Color (series 2) #555: "Range War"	12 issues	One-shot	May–July 1954		Dell Comics	Adaptation of the novel The Hash Knife Outfit (1933).	
Zane Grey	Four Color (series 2) #583: "The Lost Wagon Train"	12 issues	One-shot	September 1954		Dell Comics	Adaptation of the 1936 novel of the same title.	
Zane Grey	Four Color (series 2) #604: "Shadow on the Trail"	12 issues	One-shot	December 1954-February 1955		Dell Comics	Adaptation of the 1946 novel of the same title.	
Zane Grey	Four Color (series 2) #616: "To the Last Man"	12 issues	One-shot	March–May 1955		Dell Comics	Adaptation of the 1921 novel of the same title.	
Zane Grey	Four Color (series 2) #632: "Fighting Caravans"	12 issues	One-shot	June–August 1955		Dell Comics	Last installment in the Zane Grey Picturized Edition series, adapted from the 1929 novel of the same title.	
Zane Grey	Zane Grey's Stories of the West #27—39	13 issues	Ongoing series	September 1955 – November 1958		Dell Comics		
Zane Grey	Four Color (series 2) #996: "Zane Grey's Stories of the West – Nevada"	1 issue	One-shot	June–August 1959		Dell Comics		
Zorro	Four Color (series 2) #228: "The Mark of Zorro"	7 issues	One-shot	May 1949		Dell Comics		
Zorro	Four Color (series 2) #425: "The Return of Zorro"	7 issues	One-shot	September 1952		Dell Comics		
Zorro	Four Color (series 2) #497: "The Sword of Zorro"	7 issues	One-shot	September 1953		Dell Comics		
Zorro	Four Color (series 2) #538: "The Mask of Zorro"	7 issues	One-shot	March 1954		Dell Comics		
Zorro	Four Color (series 2) #574: "The Hand of Zorro"	7 issues	One-shot	August 1954		Dell Comics		
Zorro	Four Color (series 2) #617: "The Quest of Zorro"	7 issues	One-shot	March 1955		Dell Comics		
Zorro	Four Color (series 2) #732: "The Challenge of Zorro"	7 issues	One-shot	October 1956		Dell Comics		
Zorro	Dracula versus Zorro	2 issues	Limited series	October – November 1993	Don McGregor	Topps Comics	Crossover with Dracula; reprinted by Image Comics from September to October 1998.	
Zorro	The Lone Ranger: The Death of Zorro	4 issues	Limited series	March – June 2011	Ande Parks	Dynamite Entertainment	Crossover with the Lone Ranger.	
Zorro	Django/Zorro	7 issues	Limited series	November 2014 – May 2015	Quentin Tarantino, Matt Wagner	Dynamite Entertainment, Vertigo Comics	Crossover with Django Unchained.	
Zorro	Zorro in the Land that Time Forgot	4 issues	Limited series	October 2020 – April 2021	Mike Wolfer	Dynamite Entertainment	Crossover with Caprona.	

== See also ==
- Lists of comics based on media
  - List of comics based on films
  - List of comics based on Hasbro properties
  - List of comics based on television programs
  - List of comics based on unproduced film projects
  - List of comics based on video games
- Lists of media based on comics
  - List of films based on comics
  - List of novels based on comics
  - List of television programs based on comics
  - List of video games based on comics
- Lists of media based on novels or short fiction
  - Lists of works of fiction made into feature films
  - List of short fiction made into feature films
