= 7 Billion Needles =

Japanese manga series

- Cover of the first manga volume

70億の針 (70 Oku no Hari)
- Genre: Horror, Science fiction
- Manga
- Written by: Nobuaki Tadano
- Published by: Media Factory
- English publisher: NA: Vertical
- Magazine: Monthly Comic Flapper
- Original run: April 2008 – March 2010
- Volumes: 4

7 Billion Needles (Japanese: 70億の針, Hepburn: 70 Oku no Hari) is a Japanese manga series written and illustrated by Nobuaki Tadano and published in North America by Vertical. It was inspired by the 1950 science fiction novel Needle by Hal Clement.

== Plot ==
The story revolves around Hikaru Takabe, a reclusive teenage girl who is secretly host to a being known as Horizon, in search of an intergalactic murderer intent on killing humanity.

== Release ==
The series, partly inspired by the science-fiction novel Needle by Hal Clement, began serialization in Monthly Comic Flapper in April 2008. It was licensed in North America by Vertical. The last two volumes of the Vertical edition are out of print, and are only available in digital format.

No.	Original release date	Original ISBN	English release date	English ISBN
1	November 22, 2008	978-4-8401-2291-7	September 28, 2010	978-1-934287-87-3
1. "You are not Alone"; 2. "Leave me Alone!"; 3. "Horizon"; 4. "Investigation"; 5. "Friends"; 6. "The Contract of Light"
2	April 23, 2009	978-4-8401-2559-8	November 23, 2010	978-1-934287-95-8
7. "Home Island"; 8. "Childhood Friend"; 9. "Another Disaster"; 10. "Repetition"; 11. "Alone"; 12. "Conversation in Light"
3	October 23, 2009	978-4-8401-2924-4	February 15, 2011	978-1-932234-27-5
13. "Mutation"; 14. "Subspecies"; 15. "Evolution Moderator"; 16. "Castle of Selection"; 17. "Survival"; 18. "Union of Light"
4	March 23, 2010	978-4-8401-2993-0	April 26, 2011	978-1-935654-16-2
19. "Family"; 20. "Monster"; 21. "The Moderator's Judgement"; 22. "Acceptance"; 23. "Separation of Light"; Extra: "Hikikomori Headphone Girl"

== Reception ==
It was nominated for an Eisner Award for Best Adaptation from Another Work in 2011.

Deb Aoki from About.com said that "7 Billion Needles is a solid and entertaining sci-fi/action read that's well worth a look", and praised the "crisp and straightforward graphic storytelling", but criticized the "unimaginative character designs" saying, "do all Japanese schoolgirls look like siblings, just with different hairstyles?". Aoki also noted that the plot is basically the same as Parasyte. Writing for Anime News Network, Carlo Santos described the manga as a "modern polish and hard-hitting action". He also commented that, in the end, "Hikaru's quest as the Everyday Teenager Who Miraculously Discovers Special Abilities And Must Now Save The World is just like all the other ones".

Ain't It Cool News's Scott Green thought "7 Billion Needles... maybe it was some failing that I didn't figure it out earlier, but once the title's meaning became evident, it became pretty brilliant." Green praised "the ways in which the manga plays with perception, senses, and connection with alien intelligence are the ways in which sci-fi writing is made interesting", but noted that "it doesn't manage that to the extent that the series becomes one of the more urgently involving that you'll read." Chris Kirby writing for Mania Entertainment said it's "a very exciting series as it avoids any preconceived pratfalls this type of story can lean towards." Kirby "would love to see this series animated because of how clean and attractive the art is and how mature the overall story is."

Joseph Luster from Otaku USA said that "there are times that Tadano's artwork comes off as slightly amateurish; awkward poses and angles abound, mostly from human characters. However, he makes up for it in spades in almost every other area" and noted "the hulking mutations are reminiscent of Akira's Tetsuo [Shima]—organs and appendages spewing and twisting together in a tidal wave of flesh." Luster also commented that it "makes for a briskly paced and well-constructed narrative that, despite some of the aforementioned shortcomings, is one of the better examples of sci-fi manga currently available." Carlo Santos in another review "love how the ending of 7 Billion Needles hinges on humankind's capacity for love. It's a beautiful, moving message in a series where so much of the action is centered around fantastical, non-human things", but said that with "powers building up, the final battle turns into this outlandish celestial light show that would be more at home in Dragon Ball rather than a thoughtful sci-fi masterpiece."
