= The Dark Tower: End-World Almanac =

Marvel Comics sourcebook

- Cover of The Dark Tower: End-World Almanac (Jul., 2008)

Publication information
- Publisher: Marvel Comics
- Format: One-shot
- Publication date: Jul., 2008
- No. of issues: 1

Creative team
- Created by: Stephen King
- Written by: Robin Furth (adaptation); Peter David (script); Anthony Flamini
- Artist(s): Jae Lee, Richard Isanove, David Yardin, Val Staples

The Dark Tower: End-World Almanac is a one-shot comic book sourcebook published by Marvel Comics. It is the fourth non-sequential companion publication released as an extension of the comic book series based on Stephen King's The Dark Tower series of novels. Released the same day as the final issue of The Dark Tower: The Long Road Home, The Dark Tower: End-World Almanac features excerpts of series content by Robin Furth, Peter David, Jae Lee, and Richard Isanove, with additional writing by Anthony Flamini and additional interior art by David Yardin and Val Staples. The sourcebook serves to give background on the people, places, and mythology of the Dark Tower series (including profiles on Thunderclap, Empathica, the Badlands, and Le Casse Roi Russe). The issue was published on July 2, 2008.

== Publication dates ==
- Issue #1: July 2, 2008

== See also ==
- The Dark Tower (comics)
