= The Dark Tower: The Gunslinger - Evil Ground =

American comic book by Robin Furth, Peter David and Richard Isanove

- Cover of The Dark Tower: The Gunslinger - Evil Ground #1 (Apr., 2013)

Publication information
- Publisher: Marvel Comics
- Schedule: "Monthly"
- Format: Limited series
- Publication date: Apr. - Jun., 2013
- No. of issues: 2

Creative team
- Created by: Stephen King
- Written by: Robin Furth (adaptation); Peter David (script)
- Artist(s): Richard Isanove, Dean White

The Dark Tower: The Gunslinger - Evil Ground is a two-issue comic book limited series published by Marvel Comics. It is the third non-sequential comic book limited series based on Stephen King's The Dark Tower series of novels. It is plotted by Robin Furth, scripted by Peter David, and illustrated by Richard Isanove and Dean White. Stephen King is the Creative and Executive Director of the project. The first issue was published on April 3, 2013.

Chronologically, Evil Ground takes place between The Dark Tower: The Gunslinger - The Journey Begins and The Dark Tower: The Gunslinger - The Little Sisters of Eluria but also features memories of a journey in the past. It is framed as a story within a story within a story, much like the Dark Tower novel The Wind Through the Keyhole, although the plots are not directly related.

| Preceded by | Followed by |
|---|---|
| The Dark Tower: The Gunslinger - Sheemie's Tale | The Dark Tower: The Gunslinger - So Fell Lord Perth |

== Publication dates ==
- Issue #1: April 3, 2013
- Issue #2: June 5, 2013

== Collected editions ==
Along with the two-issue run of The Dark Tower: The Gunslinger - Sheemie's Tale and the single-issue release of The Dark Tower: The Gunslinger - So Fell Lord Perth, the two-issue run of Evil Ground was included in a collected paperback edition entitled The Dark Tower: The Gunslinger - Last Shots and released by Marvel on October 8, 2013 (ISBN 0785149414). The series was also included in the hardcover release of The Dark Tower: The Gunslinger Omnibus on September 3, 2014 (ISBN 0785188703).

== See also ==
- The Dark Tower (comics)
