= The Dark Tower: Guide to Gilead =

Comic book sourcebook published by Marvel Comics

- Cover of The Dark Tower: Guide to Gilead (Apr., 2009)

Publication information
- Publisher: Marvel Comics
- Format: One-shot
- Publication date: Apr., 2009
- No. of issues: 1

Creative team
- Created by: Stephen King
- Written by: Robin Furth (adaptation); Peter David (script); Anthony Flamini
- Artist(s): Jae Lee, Richard Isanove, David Yardin, Val Staples

The Dark Tower: Guide to Gilead is a one-shot comic book sourcebook published by Marvel Comics. It is the fifth non-sequential companion publication released as an extension of the comic book series based on Stephen King's The Dark Tower series of novels. Released one week before The Dark Tower: The Sorcerer, The Dark Tower: End-World Almanac features excerpts of series content by Robin Furth, Peter David, Jae Lee, and Richard Isanove, with additional writing by Anthony Flamini and additional interior art by David Yardin and Val Staples. The sourcebook serves to give background on the people, places, and mythology of the Dark Tower series (including profiles on Buffalo Star, the Queen o' Green Days, Lord Perth, the Blue-Faced Barbarians, and the Kuvian Night Soldiers). The issue was published on April 8, 2009.

== Publication dates ==
- Issue #1: April 8, 2009

== See also ==
- The Dark Tower (comics)
