= The Dark Tower: The Gunslinger - Sheemie's Tale =

American comic book by Robin Furth and Richard Isanove

- Cover of The Dark Tower: The Gunslinger - Sheemie's Tale #1 (Jan., 2013)

Publication information
- Publisher: Marvel Comics
- Schedule: "Monthly"
- Format: Limited series
- Publication date: Jan. - Feb., 2013
- No. of issues: 2

Creative team
- Created by: Stephen King
- Written by: Robin Furth (adaptation and script)
- Artist: Richard Isanove

The Dark Tower: The Gunslinger - Sheemie's Tale is a two-issue comic book limited series published by Marvel Comics. It is the second non-sequential comic book limited series based on Stephen King's The Dark Tower series of novels. It is plotted and scripted by Robin Furth, with illustrations by Richard Isanove. Stephen King is the Creative and Executive Director of the project. The first issue was published on January 9, 2013.

Sheemie's Tale originally was solicited as a one-shot to serve as an interlude between The Dark Tower: The Gunslinger - The Journey Begins and The Dark Tower: The Gunslinger - The Little Sisters of Eluria. It initially was scheduled for publication in November 2010, then postponed to January 26, 2011, and later put on indefinite hiatus. When finally released, it was announced as a two-issue limited series.

Preceded by	Followed by
The Dark Tower: The Gunslinger - The Man in Black	The Dark Tower: The Gunslinger - Evil Ground

== Publication dates ==
- Issue #1: January 9, 2013
- Issue #2: February 13, 2013

== Collected editions ==
The two-issue run of Sheemie's Tale was included, along with the two-issue run of The Dark Tower: The Gunslinger - Evil Ground and the single-issue release of The Dark Tower: The Gunslinger - So Fell Lord Perth, in a collected paperback edition entitled The Dark Tower: The Gunslinger - Last Shots and released by Marvel on October 8, 2013 (ISBN 0785149414). The series was also included in the hardcover release of The Dark Tower: The Gunslinger Omnibus on September 3, 2014 (ISBN 0785188703).

== See also ==
- The Dark Tower (comics)
