= Anthony Flamini =

American freelance comic book writer

- Born: October 3, 1978 (age 48) Voorhees Township, New Jersey
- Area: Writer

Anthony Flamini (born October 3, 1978) is an American freelance comic book writer. He served as Head Writer and Coordinator for the "Civil War: Battle Damage Report" and "Civil War Files." He wrote three volumes of short stories and profiles as part of the Marvel Comics adaptation of Stephen King's Dark Tower series which have since been collected in the Dark Tower Omnibus. He also contributed to the development of the world of Planet Hulk and the histories/biographical information of several members of Big Hero 6.

== Comics work ==
Writer

- All-New Iron Manual #1 (with art by Greg Land, Eliot R. Brown & Jeffrey Huet, 2008, collected in Iron Manual TPB Vol 1, 2008, ISBN 978-0-7851-3427-5)
- All-New Official Handbook of the Marvel Universe A to Z #1-12
- All-New Official Handbook of the Marvel Universe A to Z: Update #1-3
- Annihilation: The Nova Corps Files (with art by Andrea Di Vito & Laura Villari, 2006, collected in Annihilation: Book Three HC, 2007, ISBN 978-0-7851-2513-6)
- Big Hero 6, vol. 2
- Civil War Files (with art by Steve McNiven, Dexter Vines & Morry Hollowell, 2006, collected in Civil War Companion TPB, 2007, ISBN 978-0-7851-2576-1)
- Civil War: Battle Damage Report (with co-author Ronald Byrd and art by Ed McGuinness & Scott Kolins, 2007, collected in Civil War Companion TPB, 2007, ISBN 978-0-7851-2576-1)
- Daredevil Saga #1
- The Dark Tower: Gunslinger's Guidebook (with art by Jae Lee & Richard Isanove, 2007, collected in Dark Tower Omnibus, 2011, ISBN 978-0-7851-5541-6)
- The Dark Tower: End-World Almanac (with art by David Yardin, Jae Lee & Richard Isanove, 2008, collected in Dark Tower Omnibus, 2011, ISBN 978-0-7851-5541-6)
- The Dark Tower: Guide to Gilead (with art by David Yardin, Jae Lee & Richard Isanove, 2009, collected in Dark Tower Omnibus, 2011, ISBN 978-0-7851-5541-6)
- Hulk Chronicles: WWH #1
- Marvel Atlas #1-2 (with co-authors Michael Hoskin, Eric J. Moreels & Stuart Vandal, and art by Staz Johnson & Eliot R. Brown, 2007, tpb, 2008, ISBN 978-0-7851-2998-1)
- Marvel Legacy: The 1960s Handbook (with art by Sal Buscema & Tom Smith, 2006, collected in Marvel Legacy: The 1960s-1990s Handbook TPB, 2007, ISBN 978-0-7851-2082-7)
- Marvel Legacy: The 1970s Handbook (with art by Sal Buscema & Tom Smith, 2006, collected in Marvel Legacy: The 1960s-1990s Handbook TPB, 2007, ISBN 978-0-7851-2082-7)
- Marvel Legacy: The 1980s Handbook (with art by Sal Buscema & Tom Smith, 2006, collected in Marvel Legacy: The 1960s-1990s Handbook TPB, 2007, ISBN 978-0-7851-2082-7)
- Marvel Legacy: The 1990s Handbook (with art by Ron Lim & Tom Smith, 2006, collected in Marvel Legacy: The 1960s-1990s Handbook TPB, 2007, ISBN 978-0-7851-2082-7)
- Marvel Westerns: Outlaw Files
- The Mighty Avengers: Most Wanted Files
- The New Avengers: Most Wanted Files
- The Official Handbook of the Marvel Universe: Alternate Universes 2005
- The Official Handbook of the Marvel Universe: Avengers 2005
- The Official Handbook of the Marvel Universe: Fantastic Four 2005
- The Official Handbook of the Marvel Universe: Horror 2005
- The Official Handbook of the Marvel Universe: Marvel Knights 2005
- The Official Handbook of the Marvel Universe: Teams 2005
- The Official Handbook of the Marvel Universe: Women of Marvel 2005
- Planet Hulk: Gladiator Guidebook (with co-author Greg Pak, and art by Carlo Pagulayan, Aaron Lopresti, José Ladrönn, Ryan Sook, Alex Maleev, Lucio Parrillo, James Raiz & Jim Calafiore, 2006, collected in Incredible Hulk: Planet Hulk HC, 2008, ISBN 978-0-7851-2012-4 and Hulk: Planet Hulk Omnibus, 2017, ISBN 978-1-302-90769-3)
- Skaar: Son of Hulk Presents - Savage World of Sakaar #1
- Spider-Man: Back in Black Handbook
- Thor & Hercules: Encyclopaedia Mythologica #1 (with co-authors Greg Pak, Fred Van Lente and Paul Cornell, 2009)
