= Randall Flagg =

Fictional character created by Stephen King

- Stephen King character
- Randall Flagg, as depicted by Michael Whelan
- First appearance: The Dark Man (1969)
- Created by: Stephen King
- Portrayed by: Jamey Sheridan (1994); Matthew McConaughey (2017); Jasper Pääkkönen (2019 pilot); Alexander Skarsgård (2020–21)

In-universe information
- Aliases: Walter Padick; Walter o'Dim; Marten Broadcloak Bill Hinch; Russell Faraday; Richard Fannin; Richard Freemantle; Rudin Filaro; Raymond Fiegler; The Covenant Man; Richard Fry; Robert Franq; Ramsey Forrest
- Nicknames: The Walkin' Dude; The Dark Man; The Hardcase; Ageless Stranger; The Boogeyman
- Species: Quasi-immortal human
- Family: Sam Padick (father)
- Nationality: Delain

Randall Flagg is a fictional character created by American author Stephen King, who has appeared in at least nine of his novels. Described as "an accomplished sorcerer and a devoted servant of the Outer Dark", he has supernatural abilities involving necromancy, prophecy, and influence over animal and human behavior. His goals typically center on bringing down civilizations through destruction and conflict. He has a variety of names, usually with the initial letters "R. F." but with occasional exceptions, such as Walter o'Dim and Marten Broadcloak in The Dark Tower series.

Flagg first appeared in King's 1978 novel The Stand as a demonic figure who wreaks havoc after a plague kills most of the world population. He makes his second appearance in the 1984 novel The Eyes of the Dragon as an evil wizard trying to plunge the fictional medieval city of Delain into chaos. Flagg is a primary antagonist in King's epic series, The Dark Tower, where he works with the Crimson King to keep protagonist Roland Deschain from reaching the Tower – the linchpin of existence – so he can claim it for himself and become a god. The Dark Tower expanded on Flagg's background and motivation, linking his previous appearances. Flagg was portrayed by Jamey Sheridan in a 1994 television miniseries adaptation of The Stand, by Matthew McConaughey in a 2017 The Dark Tower film adaptation, and by Alexander Skarsgård in a 2020-21 television miniseries adaptation of The Stand. He has additionally appeared in adaptations of The Dark Tower and The Stand by Marvel Comics.

King initially cited Donald DeFreeze, primary kidnapper of Patty Hearst, as his inspiration for Flagg. Later, he attributed Flagg to an image of a man walking the roads in cowboy boots, denim jeans and a jacket, a notion which "came out of nowhere" when he was in college.

== Appearances ==
=== Poem ===
==== "The Dark Man" ====
King first wrote the poem "The Dark Man" in college, about an unnamed man who rides the rails and confesses to murder and rape. The one-page poem was published in Ubris in 1969. According to King, the poem served as the genesis for Flagg.

=== Novels ===
==== The Stand ====
There was a dark hilarity in his face, and perhaps in his heart, too, you would think—and you would be right. It was the face of a hatefully happy man, a face that radiated a horrible handsome warmth, a face to make water glasses shatter in the hands of tired truck-stop waitresses, to make small children crash their trikes into board fences and then run wailing to their mommies with stake-shaped splinters sticking out of their knees. It was a face guaranteed to make barroom arguments over batting averages turn bloody.

— Stephen King, The Stand

Randall Flagg makes his first named appearance in King's 1978 apocalyptic novel The Stand, where he tries to construct a new civilization in the United States after a plague kills most of the population. Flagg is described as a "tall man of no age" in old blue jeans, denim jacket and old cowboy boots. He wears an old Boy Scout knapsack and carries pamphlets from dozens of fringe splinter groups in his pockets. Flagg's background is vague, even to him; he says that at some point he just "became", although he remembers meeting Lee Harvey Oswald, being a Marine, a Klansman, and a Viet Cong member, and having a hand in the kidnapping of Patty Hearst. In Las Vegas Flagg attracts people drawn to destruction, power and tyranny, using crucifixion, torture and other punishments on those disloyal to him. His followers reorganize society, repairing and restarting services in the city of Las Vegas, Nevada. Flagg plans to attack and destroy a rival emerging civilization—Mother Abagail's Free Zone in Boulder, Colorado—to become the dominant society in the former United States.

After two of Flagg's followers fail to kill the leaders of the Free Zone, the Boulder community sends a group of men to Las Vegas to stop him. The three who reach the city are taken prisoner, and Flagg orders one of them executed for his defiance. As the other two are being prepared for a public execution, one of Flagg's most loyal followers, the Trashcan Man, arrives with a nuclear warhead salvaged from a military base. A manifestation of energy described by one of the free zone prisoners as the hand of God detonates the warhead, annihilating the city and everyone in it, while Flagg vanishes.

An expanded edition of The Stand was published in 1990, restoring text that had been cut from the original edition. It includes an epilogue in which Flagg, having survived the Las Vegas explosion, appears on a beach, and finds a primitive tribe ready to fall under his influence.

==== The Eyes of the Dragon ====
Flagg later appears in The Eyes of the Dragon, published in 1984 as an evil wizard wreaking havoc in the medieval country of Delain. He is described as a "thin and stern-faced man of about 50 [years of age]", despite being much older. He hides himself under a dark cloak, and most of his magic comes from spells, potions, and poisons. He is described as a "sickness" which seems to reappear in Delain when there is something worth destroying. In this novel, Flagg schemes to throw the kingdom of Delain into chaos by poisoning the king and framing Prince Peter, the legitimate heir to the throne, for the crime. Peter's naive, resentful younger brother Thomas becomes king instead; Flagg, whom he sees as his only friend, becomes his royal advisor. Due to his youth and inexperience, Thomas allows Flagg great power and is easily manipulated by the wizard. Flagg becomes the de facto ruler of Delain, plunging the kingdom into a Dark Age. Years later Thomas confronts Flagg about his father's murder, which he witnessed as a child but suppressed the memory out of fear. Thomas shoots Flagg in the eye with an arrow, and Flagg disappears from the kingdom. Peter is given his rightful throne; Thomas and his butler, Dennis, leave the kingdom in search of Flagg. The novel states that Thomas and Dennis find Flagg, but the nature of their encounter is never revealed and Flagg survives to engender chaos in later stories.

==== The Dark Tower series ====
Walter O'Dim, Flagg's main persona in The Dark Tower. O'Dim was originally written as a separate character from Flagg, but King later combined the two. Art by Michael Whelan

Flagg makes several appearances in King's Dark Tower series (1982-2012), which follows gunslinger Roland Deschain as he travels in search of the Dark Tower. Flagg's presence is felt in the opening sentence of the first book: "The man in black fled across the desert and the gunslinger followed". In this series, Flagg assumes the guise of several individuals. He first appears as Walter O'Dim, chased across the desert by Roland. In flashbacks Flagg assumes the identity of Marten Broadcloak, a wizard who conspires with the Crimson King to cause the fall of the Dark Tower. In the original edition of the first novel Marten is a separate person from Walter, who is also not known to be Flagg, but Marten and Walter are retconned into one character in the revised version.

When Roland was young, Marten had an affair with Roland's mother, Gabrielle, using the affair to provoke Roland to take the gunslinger test early. He hoped Roland would fail so he would be exiled but Roland passed the test. Eventually, Roland catches Walter; they have a long discussion about Roland's destiny and the Tower which causes him to slip into delirium. He awakens to find a pile of bones in Walter's place. In the original edition, Walter and Marten are separate characters, with Walter dying at the end of the novel. When King published an expanded edition of the novel, Walter and Marten are portrayed as identical, and Walter fakes his own death.

Flagg appears briefly in a flashback in the second installment of the Dark Tower series, The Drawing of the Three. Roland recalls seeing two men named Thomas and Dennis pursuing a man named Flagg, who was almost certainly a demon. These are implied to be the same characters from The Eyes of the Dragon. This is the first example of the Dark Tower series crossing over with one of King's other novels.

Flagg makes his next full appearance in the series' third installment, The Waste Lands. In the city of Lud, Flagg saves Tick-Tock Man Andrew Quick, an enemy of Roland's ka-tet left for dead in an earlier confrontation. Quick becomes Flagg's devoted servant, and Flagg assumes the name of Richard Fannin. The character returns in the fourth book, Wizard and Glass, as Marten Broadcloak. Also identifying himself as Flagg, he warns Roland and his ka-tet to abandon their quest for the Dark Tower. In flashbacks, the reader learns that Flagg as Walter O'Dim was an emissary for John Farson, one of those responsible for the destruction of Roland's home Gilead.

The "Argument", a summary of the series thus far, beginning Wolves of the Calla—the fifth novel in the series—notes that Flagg is known as Broadcloak, Fannin and John Farson, depending on the world in which he lives. In Wolves of the Calla, Flagg makes a brief appearance as Walter o'Dim when Father Callahan arrives in Roland's world. Flagg gives Callahan Black Thirteen, a dangerous crystal ball, hoping it will kill Roland on his way to the tower. In this encounter, Flagg is described with "the face of a human weasel", and "the same welling red circle" on his forehead as the Can-toi. His appearance in Song of Susannah is via a flashback revealing that Flagg bargained with the succubus Mia; this resulted in the birth of Mordred Deschain, son of both Roland and the Crimson King.

In The Dark Tower, Flagg indicates that he is not John Farson, but served under him until the latter's downfall. Flagg reveals his plans to climb the Dark Tower, see the room at the top and become the god of all. Flagg believes that he can only achieve this by killing Mordred and taking his birthmark-stained foot. Although he tries to befriend Mordred and pledge allegiance to him, Mordred telepathically senses Flagg's true motives and eats him, forcing him to rip out his eyes and tongue first.

The Dark Tower reveals more of Flagg's background, relating that he was born Walter Padick in Delain to Sam the Miller of Eastar'd Barony. At age 13, Walter set out for a life on the road, but was raped by a fellow wanderer; author Bev Vincent hypothesized in The Road to the Dark Tower that Flagg's later actions toward Delain in The Eyes of the Dragon may have been revenge for the abuse he suffered as a child. Resisting the temptation to crawl back home, Padick instead moves toward his destiny; he learns various forms of magic, achieving a quasi-immortality. After centuries of wreaking havoc, Flagg attracts the attention of the Crimson King, who adopts him as his emissary.

Though Flagg is presumably killed in the final novel, Roland later learns that he is cursed to repeat his quest through multiple cycles of reincarnation. Therefore, Flagg is resurrected when Roland's next cycle begins, and the gunslinger pursues him.

In the 2017 film, set during the next cycle, Flagg identifies himself only as his alias "Walter". He is also revealed to have killed Roland's father in the past. Flagg uses the minds of psychic children (whom his followers kidnap for him), to attack the tower. His goal is to destroy the tower (which holds the entire multiverse together), and thus allow the dark creatures beyond to invade and destroy reality. He kidnaps the powerful psychic child Jake Chambers (an alternate version of Roland's child companion in the previous cycle) and begins his next strike against the tower. However, Roland arrives and defeats Flagg's men. Flagg uses magic to battle Roland, but the gunslinger outsmarts him and fatally shoots Flagg in the head. This ends the sorcerer's reign once and for all, and frees Roland from his curse.

In 2012, King published a new story from The Dark Tower entitled The Wind Through the Keyhole. Here Flagg is depicted as the Covenant Man: central villain of the book's story within a story, "The Wind Through the Keyhole", a legend from Mid-World set years before the series' beginning. He is the Barony's "tax collector" from Gilead, attempting to collect taxes from residents of the small town of Tree. The Covenant Man sends the story's protagonist, a young boy named Tim, on a perilous quest through the Endless Forest to save his mother; unbeknownst to Tim, the Covenant Man is supplying him with false prophecies and misinformation as part of a cruel practical joke. However, Tim succeeds in his journey; he saves his mother after encountering the wizard Maerlyn, who has been imprisoned in the form of a "tyger". While the Covenant Man is not explicitly identified as Flagg, with only the initials "RF/MB" in his signature as identification and at one point being referred to as 'the man in the black cloak', Stephen King confirmed in an interview with Bev Vincent for his book The Dark Tower Companion that the two are one and the same.

==== Hearts in Atlantis ====
In Hearts in Atlantis (1999), Raymond Fiegler is identified near the novel's end as leader of an activist group when he prevents Carol Gerber from retrieving an unexploded bomb on a college campus. King never identifies Fiegler as Flagg, but Christopher Golden and Hank Wagner suggest in The Complete Stephen King Universe that there is little doubt Fiegler is Flagg. Golden and Wagner cite evidence such as Fiegler's ability to make himself appear "dim", an ability shared by Flagg in Eyes of the Dragon, his manipulation of Carol Gerber and her activist friends and Flagg's frequent use of aliases, usually with the initials "R.F."

==== Gwendy's Button Box trilogy ====
Stephen King's novel Gwendy's Button Box, which he co-wrote with Richard Chizmar, features a mysterious man in black named Richard Farris. Farris gives a young girl, Gwendy Peterson, a "button box" which, depending on the buttons or levers that are used, can dispense magical treats or cause death and destruction. Farris reappeared in Gwendy's Magic Feather (written solely by Chizmar) and Gwendy's Final Task (co-written by both King and Chizmar).

Chizmar was asked whether or not Richard Farris's initials signified that he was another manifestation of Randall Flagg; his response was "Maayyybee... He's definitely mysterious, and it's really obvious there's more to him than meets the eye." Chizmar later revealed during a Reddit AMA session that the initials were indeed indicative of Farris being Flagg. In 2022, King stated while the character started off as Flagg that was no longer the case: "I saw him as a force of evil when I first started to write about the box. By the time I realized he was a force of the White, it was too late to change the initials."

== In other media ==
=== Film and TV ===
King was influential in deciding who would play Flagg in the 1994 television adaptation of The Stand. He felt Flagg was the best villain he had ever created, and wanted the actor playing him to be right for the part. Director Mick Garris and the studios wanted to give the role to an established star such as Christopher Walken, James Woods, Willem Dafoe or Jeff Goldblum. King himself had suggested Robert Duvall in his introduction to the novel. Miguel Ferrer, who played Flagg's henchman in the film, was interested in playing the villain.

King's idea for the role was someone who "would make the ladies' hearts go pitty pat, that looked like the type of guy you would see on the cover of one of those sweet, savage love paperback romances". He eventually persuaded Garris to cast a lesser-known actor as Flagg; Garris ultimately chose Jamey Sheridan for the role.

Sheridan's performance was generally well received. Entertainment Weekly's Ken Tucker wrote that the best acting came from Sheridan, who gave the character a "grim intensity". He commented that Sheridan had "leading-man looks" with the hair of a "dissolute heavy metal star", making him "unsettling" even when not wearing makeup that makes him look like a devil. Douglas E. Winter of Fangoria magazine believed that Sheridan might have been a bit young and "zany" for the part, but gave a credible performance; he said that Sheridan attacked the role "with the swagger of Elvis, the sway of David Koresh and as much craziness as your heart desires (and network TV allows)".

In February 2011, Warner Bros. announced plans to produce a new feature film adaptation of The Stand. King commented that he would like to see Dutch actor Rutger Hauer in the role of Flagg, but conceded that he was perhaps too old for the part. In August 2014, it was reported that Warner Bros. wanted actor Matthew McConaughey for the role.

McConaughey was confirmed to be playing Walter, Flagg's alter-ego, in the film adaptation of The Dark Tower in 2016. Nikolaj Arcel, the film's director and co-writer, said, "Matthew is an incredible actor who can do anything. That's how I feel about [Walter]. He could do anything." Arcel described Walter as having "a very interesting way of seeing the world. He sees it with a sort of delight, even though he is obviously on the wrong side of the light-and-dark spectrum. He's someone I've been having a lot of fun with." McConaughey described Walter as "the Devil having a good time, getting turned on by exposing human hypocrisies wherever he finds them".

The 2016 miniseries 11.22.63, based on King's 2011 novel 11/22/63, incorporates numerous references to other King stories, including an appearance by Randall Flagg, who is seen cycling through the Dallas throngs just before the assassination of John F. Kennedy in the final episode.

In 2019, Finnish actor Jasper Pääkkönen was cast as Marten Broadcloak for the pilot of Amazon Prime Video's television adaptation of The Dark Tower, but Amazon ultimately decided not to pursue the series. In the same year, Swedish actor Alexander Skarsgård was cast as Randall Flagg in the CBS All Access miniseries adaptation of The Stand. Showrunner Taylor Elmore described Skarsgård's Flagg with "[he] is so beautiful, he is absolutely a lion-like God figure. With perfect hair and... and also, there's a softness to Alex's performance that I think is fascinating. Alex just plays it where you feel not only sympathy for this character, but you hopefully understand why it's so easy for people to gravitate toward him. He's just magnetic, he's just absolutely fascinating to watch. He's galvanizing as a leader."

=== Comics ===
Beginning in 2007, Marvel Comics released a series of comics which were a prequel to the Dark Tower novels. Randall Flagg, appearing as Marten Broadcloak and Walter o'Dim, plays a significant role in the series.

In April 2009, Marvel released a single-issue comic written by Robin Furth and illustrated by Richard Isanove entitled The Dark Tower: Sorcerer, which focused on the character of Marten Broadcloak-Walter o'Dim. Sorcerer provides an origin for the character that is different from the one King initially wrote, explaining that Walter was the son of the wizard Maerlyn and Selena, Goddess of the Black Moon. Walter was left at the home of a mill owner "to learn the ways of men". At age 13, Walter burns down his adoptive father's mill before running away to find his true father; Walter's rape is not mentioned. Furth wrote in the comic's afterword that the idea of Maerlyn being Walter's father came from King.

The comic also reveals that Marten had poisoned Roland's infant brother. Furth introduced the idea that the Bends o' the Rainbow, 13 magic spheres created by Maerlyn in the distant past, are sentient beings able to project personifications which can interact with other characters. Marten has a sexual relationship with the female personification of Maerlyn's Grapefruit, one of the spheres. This is described as incestuous, since the beings were given life by Maerlyn, Walter's biological father; Marten and the Grapefruit repeatedly call each other as brother and sister. The siblings also refer to the Crimson King as their "cousin", indicating that Maerlyn is related to him. In her afterword, Furth says that although she conceived these ideas, King approved them.

According to the comic, Marten's romantic feelings for Roland's mother trigger jealousy in the Grapefruit who influences Roland to unwittingly kill his mother; in Wizard and Glass, the witch known as Rhea of the Cöos orchestrates Roland's matricide as revenge for his killing of her pet snake. Enraged, Marten imprisons his "sister" in the Grapefruit and vows revenge on Roland for his involvement in his beloved's death. Addressing inconsistencies between the novels and the comics, Furth stated that the comics exist on another level of the Tower: "a spinoff world, one which is very similar to, but not exactly the same as the one where [the Dark Tower novels] take place".

On the character of Marten, Furth noted that "[he] is one of the scariest characters that Stephen King has ever created. He moves from book to book, bringing chaos and anarchy with him... He is quite a demonic figure, and as such he is one of the great anti-heroes of contemporary popular fiction" and that "journeying into Walter's mind is a pretty wild experience and at times a little frightening. You have to travel to very dark places." To find Walter's voice, Furth went to John Milton's Paradise Lost, William Blake's Proverbs of Hell, the Biblical Song of Solomon and the writings of Aleister Crowley for inspiration.

In his interview with Bev Vincent, Isanove opined that Walter was his favorite character to draw; "Jae [Lee, the original artist for the series] established him as almost androgynous. He's always got this bare chest, and he's very feminine in the way he moves, with his hands raised. He's always moving his hands around. He's got this weird face, with a broken nose and greasy hair. He's starting to bald, but he's always got a very white separation in the middle of it. He's just so greasy, he's great to draw. And he still has to be seductive at the same time, so you can't make him repulsive... He's such a great character."

Marvel later released a comic book adaptation of The Stand, which began in September 2008 and ran for thirty issues. Writer Roberto Aguirre-Sacasa described Flagg as "The man of nightmares. Or, put another way, our nightmares given human (more or less) form. The dark side of the American Dream... King's 'Walkin' Dude' may not be the Devil, himself, as Mother Abagail says, but he comes pretty damn close..." Initially, artist Mike Perkins said he felt "Flagg needed to be designed less as a man—more as a force of nature. His hair will obscure his features, his face will be almost always in heavy shadow. This is the creature lurking under your bed, in your wardrobe, in your nightmares. Slightly familiar but wholly terrifying." Roberto Aguirre-Sacasa later commented on the original idea of hiding Flagg's face: "...the further into the book and the adaptation you go, the less feasible that becomes. Stephen spends so much time describing [Flagg]'s features and smiles, you need to show those things."

== Concept and creation ==
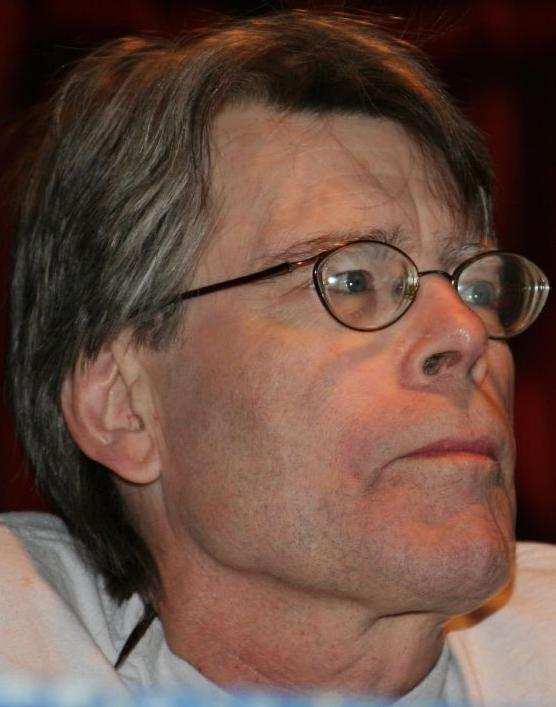
Stephen King has said that the inspiration for Flagg's character "came out of nowhere".

King initially named Donald DeFreeze, lead kidnapper in the Patty Hearst case, as his inspiration for Randall Flagg. According to King, he remembered the Patty Hearst case when he began to write a description of DeFreeze: "Donald DeFreeze is a dark man". He remembered that in photographs of the bank robbery in which Patty Hearst participated that DeFreeze was only partially visible, hidden under a large hat. What he looked like was based on guesses made by people who only saw a portion of him. This inspired King, who then wrote "A dark man with no face". After reading "Once in every generation the plague will fall among them", King began writing The Stand and developing the character of Randall Flagg.

In 2004, King said that Flagg had been a presence in his writing since the beginning of his career, with the idea coming to him in college. He first wrote a poem, "The Dark Man", about a man who rides the rails and confesses to murder and rape; written on the back of a placemat in a college restaurant, the one-page poem was published in 1969, but the character never left King's mind. To the author, what made Flagg interesting was "the idea of the villain as somebody who was always on the outside looking in, and hated people who had good fellowship and good conversation and friends".

== Characterization and critical reception ==
When Stephen King created the character of Flagg, he based him around what he believed evil represented. To King, Flagg is "somebody who's very charismatic, laughs a lot, [is] tremendously attractive to men and women both, and [is] somebody who just appeals to the worst in all of us". This idea carries over into The Stand, in which Flagg first appears as the personification of evil opposing Mother Abagail, the personification of good. Character Tom Cullen ascribes to Flagg the ability to kill animals and inflict cancer at will, referring to him as the demon Legion, while character Glen Bateman refers to him as the Lovecraftian entity Nyarlathotep, among other ancient names. King wanted Flagg to embody a "gigantic evil", although he intended the character to weaken by the end of The Stand. He said, "I think the Devil is probably a pretty funny guy. Flagg is like the archetype of everything that I know about real evil, going back all the way to Charles Starkweather in the '50s—he is somebody who is empty and who has to be filled with other people's hates, fears, resentments, laughs. Flagg, Koresh, Jim Jones, Hitler—they're all basically the same guy". Although Flagg does not explicitly represent Satan, this does not detract from what King sees as his ultimate goal. He notes that no matter who sees him or how he is seen as Flagg appears differently to different individuals, his message is the same: "I know all the things that you want and I can give them to you and all you have to do is give me your soul".

Critics also note Flagg's penchant for evil. Tony Magistrale, author of Stephen King: The Second Decade, Danse Macabre to The Dark Half sees Flagg as a Shakespearean villain, comparing him to Iago, Edmund and Richard III, contending that Flagg is an antihero. Magistrale believes that Flagg's evil is based on his ability to replace peace with conflict and unity with destruction; although he seeks power, it is merely a resource to achieve a greater level of destruction.

Author and journalist Heidi Stringell finds Flagg "an embodiment of pure evil", contending that King sees good and evil as "real forces"; Flagg's embodiment of evil is confirmed by the fact that "he is a killer, a maker of mischief, a liar, and a tempter". To Stringell, Flagg's disappearance at the end of The Stand shows that "evil ultimately leads nowhere". The author calls Flagg a "generic hybrid" of the archetypical "Dark Man and the Trickster". To her, the combination of these two characteristics found in different cultural realms forces people to face their "flawed humanity" with the "amorality" Flagg represents. Jenifer Paquette, author of Respecting The Stand: A Critical Analysis of Stephen King's Apocalyptic Novel, writes that "Flagg's horror is that he looks like an ordinary man, and his behavior is a mockery of humanity - a terrible insight into the human psyche. King suggests that the thing to fear the most is inside ourselves".

Douglas Winter, author of Fear Itself: The Horror Fiction of Stephen King, believes that Flagg epitomizes the Gothic villain—an "atavistic embodiment of evil"—since his appearance is indistinct, malleable and a "collection of masks". Flagg symbolizes "the inexplicable fear of the return of bygone powers—both technological and, as his last name intimates, sociopolitical". Like other Gothic villains, Flagg's plans seem to fail at every turn as he seems to need to convince others of his importance. Winter asserts that Flagg is a Miltonic superman who receives his strength from a dark, mysterious source. He compares him to J. R. R. Tolkien's Sauron in The Lord of the Rings: both collapse when directly confronted.

Journalist Alissa Stickler describes Flagg as a "contemporary medievalist interpretation on the themes of evil, magic and the (d)evil figure". She likens Flagg to Merlin, whispering in the ear of Arthur. Stickler notes that Flagg is politically powerful in The Stand and The Eyes of the Dragon; he uses his power differently in each novel, challenging depictions of evil and witchcraft common in medieval times. She explains that there does not appear to be a higher power to which Flagg "must appeal to his abilities" as there is with traditional evil. Flagg is more of a "humanesque evil", which works against him as much as it does for him. His supernatural knowledge is fallible, and the customary black-and-white depiction is replaced with an "acceptance of a shadowy gray area". Stickler says that although Flagg appears "terrifying and supernatural" as depicted by King, there are no absolutes. She concludes that Flagg represents the medieval monster both past and future, which challenges and yet supports the literary Middle Ages.

Flagg's character has its detractors. In his essay "The Glass-Eyed Dragon", author L. Sprague de Camp criticizes Flagg in Eyes of the Dragon, saying that he is one of the least-believable characters in the book and too evil to be credible. According to de Camp, absolute evil is hard to envision; whereas Adolf Hitler and Joseph Stalin believed they were improving the world, Flagg only enjoys causing destruction and chaos. De Camp notes that Flagg fails to see that there is no advantage to his actions.

Walter's eyes widen, and for a moment he looks deeply hurt. This may be absurd, but Callahan is looking into the man's deep eyes and feels sure that the emotion is nonetheless genuine. And the surety robs him of any last hope that all this might be a dream, or a final brilliant interval before true death. In dreams—his, at least—the bad guys, the scary guys, never have complex emotions.

— Stephen King, Wolves of the Calla

Flagg's embodiment of evil is not the only characteristic seen by critics. Author Joseph Reino commented that the character's presence in The Stand was "Stephen King's version of a pestilential Big Brother". Tony Magistrale revisits the character in a second book, this time comparing him to Norman Mailer. Here, Magistrale states that in The Stand Flagg gives the reader an "illustration of King's jaundiced perspective of modern America" as he presents the consequences of technology—worship and the sacrifice of "moral integrity to the quest for synthetic productivity".

Flagg's background as a rape victim and its impact on his character have also been explored. Patrick McAleer, author of Inside the Dark Tower Series: Art, Evil and Intertextuality in the Stephen King Novels, argues that Flagg's situation is the most sympathetic of all of King's characters, and his evil may be retribution: "[I]n suspending any disbelief in the possibility that reprisal is a reaction to rape, the life of Flagg becomes one that looks to strike a balance for the sexual crime committed against him. And although Flagg's possible search for justice and balance is that which becomes imbalanced and even prejudiced, the mitigating factor here is that Flagg is not an originator of evil - he is just caught up in its web as another wronged individual seeking justice". McAleer compares Flagg to Satan in Paradise Lost, suggesting that he may be another "fallen angel who has a valid case supporting his devilry". While agreeing that Flagg can be seen "relishing in evil deeds at almost every juncture", he contends that no judgement can be made without the full story and context for his actions.
