= The Dark Tower: The Gunslinger - The Man in Black =

- Cover of The Dark Tower: The Gunslinger - The Man in Black #1 (Jun., 2012)

Publication information
- Publisher: Marvel Comics
- Schedule: "Monthly"
- Format: Limited series
- Publication date: Jun. - Oct., 2012
- No. of issues: 5

Creative team
- Created by: Stephen King
- Written by: Robin Furth (adaptation); Peter David (script)
- Artist(s): Alex Maleev, Richard Isanove

The Dark Tower: The Gunslinger - The Man in Black is a five-issue comic book limited series published by Marvel Comics. It is the tenth comic book miniseries based on Stephen King's The Dark Tower series of novels. It is plotted by Robin Furth, scripted by Peter David, and illustrated by Alex Maleev and Richard Isanove. Stephen King is the Creative and Executive Director of the project. The first issue was published on June 20, 2012.

Preceded by	Followed by
The Dark Tower: The Gunslinger - The Way Station	The Dark Tower: The Gunslinger - Sheemie's Tale

== Publication dates ==
- Issue #1: June 20, 2012
- Issue #2: July 18, 2012
- Issue #3: August 15, 2012
- Issue #4: September 19, 2012
- Issue #5: October 17, 2012

== Collected editions ==
The entire five-issue run of The Man in Black was collected into a hardcover edition, released by Marvel on January 15, 2013 (ISBN 0785149376). A paperback edition was later released on October 29, 2013 (ISBN 0785149384). The series was also included in the hardcover release of The Dark Tower: The Gunslinger Omnibus on September 3, 2014 (ISBN 0785188703).

== See also ==
- The Dark Tower (comics)
