= The Dark Tower: The Sorcerer =

2009 Marvel Comics one-shot comic

- Cover of The Dark Tower: The Sorcerer #1 (Apr., 2009)

Publication information
- Publisher: Marvel Comics
- Format: One-shot
- Genre: Weird west
- Publication date: Apr., 2009
- No. of issues: 1

Creative team
- Created by: Stephen King
- Written by: Robin Furth
- Artist: Richard Isanove
- Letterer: Chris Eliopoulos

The Dark Tower: The Sorcerer is a one-shot comic book (one-issue limited series) published by Marvel Comics. It is the first non-sequential comic book limited series based on Stephen King's The Dark Tower series of novels. It is plotted and scripted by Robin Furth, with illustrations by Richard Isanove. Stephen King is the Creative and Executive Director of the project. The issue was published on April 15, 2009.

Unlike the previous three story arcs, which follow Roland Deschain and his ka-tet, The Sorcerer follows the life and motives of The Dark Tower villain Marten Broadcloak.

| Preceded by | Followed by |
|---|---|
| The Dark Tower: Treachery | The Dark Tower: Fall of Gilead |

== Publication dates ==
- Issue #1: April 15, 2009

== Related releases ==
- The Dark Tower: Guide to Gilead

== Collected editions ==
The single-issue release of The Sorcerer was included, along with the six-issue run of The Dark Tower: Fall of Gilead, in a collected hardcover edition also entitled The Dark Tower: Fall of Gilead and released by Marvel on February 23, 2010 (ISBN 0785129510). A paperback edition was later released on November 2, 2011 (ISBN 0785129529). The issue was also included in the hardcover release of The Dark Tower Omnibus on September 21, 2011 (ISBN 0785155414).

On September 25, 2018, Gallery 13 republished the original hardcover collection as Stephen King's The Dark Tower: Beginnings - The Fall of Gilead (Book 4) (ISBN 1982108274). On October 23, 2018, this edition (along with Books 1-3 and 5) was included in the boxed set Stephen King's The Dark Tower: Beginnings - The Complete Graphic Novel Series (ISBN 1982110201).

== See also ==
- The Dark Tower (comics)
