= The Dark Tower: The Gunslinger - The Way Station =

- Cover of The Dark Tower: The Gunslinger - The Way Station #1 (Dec., 2011)

Publication information
- Publisher: Marvel Comics
- Schedule: "Monthly"
- Format: Limited series
- Publication date: Dec., 2011 - Apr., 2012
- No. of issues: 5

Creative team
- Created by: Stephen King
- Written by: Robin Furth (adaptation); Peter David (script)
- Artist(s): Laurence Campbell, Richard Isanove

The Dark Tower: The Gunslinger - The Way Station is a five-issue comic book limited series published by Marvel Comics. It is the ninth comic book miniseries based on Stephen King's The Dark Tower series of novels. It is plotted by Robin Furth, scripted by Peter David, and illustrated by Laurence Campbell and Richard Isanove. Stephen King is the Creative and Executive Director of the project. The first issue was published on December 14, 2011.

Preceded by	Followed by
The Dark Tower: The Gunslinger - The Battle of Tull	The Dark Tower: The Gunslinger - The Man in Black

== Publication dates ==
- Issue #1: December 14, 2011
- Issue #2: January 11, 2012
- Issue #3: February 15, 2012
- Issue #4: March 28, 2012
- Issue #5: April 25, 2012

== Collected editions ==
The entire five-issue run of The Way Station was collected into a hardcover edition, released by Marvel on June 27, 2012 (ISBN 078514935X). A paperback edition was later released on July 30, 2013 (ISBN 0785149368). The series was also included in the hardcover release of The Dark Tower: The Gunslinger Omnibus on September 3, 2014 (ISBN 0785188703).

== See also ==
- The Dark Tower (comics)
