= The Dark Tower (2017 film) =

2017 American film by Nikolaj Arcel

- Theatrical release poster
- Directed by: Nikolaj Arcel
- Screenplay by: Akiva Goldsman; Jeff Pinkner; Anders Thomas Jensen; Nikolaj Arcel
- Based on: The Dark Tower by Stephen King
- Produced by: Akiva Goldsman; Ron Howard; Erica Huggins
- Starring: Idris Elba; Matthew McConaughey; Tom Taylor; Claudia Kim; Fran Kranz; Abbey Lee; Jackie Earle Haley
- Cinematography: Rasmus Videbæk
- Edited by: Alan Edward Bell; Dan Zimmerman
- Music by: Tom Holkenborg
- Production companies: Columbia Pictures; MRC; Imagine Entertainment; Weed Road Pictures
- Distributed by: Sony Pictures Releasing
- Release dates: July 31, 2017 (Museum of Modern Art); August 4, 2017 (United States)
- Running time: 95 minutes
- Country: United States
- Language: English
- Budget: $66 million
- Box office: $113.2 million

The Dark Tower is a 2017 American science fantasy film loosely based on Stephen King's novel series of the same name. Directed and co-written by Nikolaj Arcel, the film stars Idris Elba as Roland Deschain, a gunslinger on a quest to protect the Dark Tower—a mythical structure which supports all realities—while Matthew McConaughey plays his nemesis Walter Padick, and Tom Taylor stars as Jake Chambers, a boy who becomes Roland's apprentice.

Originally intended as the first installment in a multimedia franchise, the film combines various elements from the eight-novel series, mostly from the first and third volumes, and takes place in both modern-day New York City and in Mid-World, Roland's Old West-style parallel universe. The film is also a canonical sequel to the novels.

The production of the film was complex and difficult, as production began ten years before the release of the film. Efforts to adapt The Dark Tower series for the screen started in 2007, with periodic reports and official announcements. The project was then shelved before the rights were transitioned to a different production company. Development experienced starts and stops with various filmmakers and studios at different times, including Universal Pictures, Paramount Pictures, Warner Bros. Pictures, and Lionsgate Entertainment. The adaptation went through three major phases of planning: with J. J. Abrams from 2007 to 2009, Ron Howard from 2010 to 2015, and finally, the current iteration, announced in March 2015, produced by Sony Pictures Entertainment and Media Rights Capital, with Arcel directing and Howard remaining in a producing role.

The Dark Tower premiered at the Museum of Modern Art in New York City on July 31, 2017, and was theatrically released in the United States by Sony Pictures Releasing on August 4, 2017. The film grossed $113.2 million worldwide on a $66 million budget and received negative reviews, with criticism aimed at its compression of the multiple-novel source material into a single film, though Elba's performance, Holkenborg's musical score, and the action sequences earned praise.

== Plot ==
Eleven-year-old Jake Chambers experiences visions of a mysterious warlock, the "Man in Black", who seeks to destroy a "Tower" and bring ruin to the "Universe" while a lone "Gunslinger" opposes him. Jake's visions are dismissed by his mother, stepfather and psychiatrists as nightmares resulting from the trauma of his father's death. At his apartment home in New York City, a team claiming to be from a private psychiatric facility arrive to pick up Jake. Recognizing them from his visions as monsters wearing human skin, the boy hides in an abandoned house from one of his visions, where he discovers a high-tech portal that leads to a post-apocalyptic landscape called Mid-World.

In Mid-World, Jake encounters the Gunslinger, Roland Deschain. Roland is pursuing the Man in Black, Walter Padick, seeking revenge for Padick's role in the deaths of his father Stephen and the other Gunslingers. He explains to Jake that for decades, Walter has been abducting children with psychic powers, attempting to use their "shine" to bring down the Dark Tower, a fabled structure located at the center of the Universe. This will allow his master, a monstrous being from the darkness outside, to cross over and consume all reality.

Roland takes Jake to a local village in order to have his visions interpreted by a seer. Having learned of Jake's escape, Walter is informed by his minion Sayre that Jake has "pure Shine", enough psychic potential to destroy the Dark Tower single-handedly. The warlock tracks down Jake's parents, brutally murdering his stepfather and torturing his mother for information.

Back in Mid-World, the seer determines that the machine is six months away on foot; the only shortcut is through one of Walter's secret labs. Jake realizes that Walter has a lab in New York that he recognizes from a vision. Suddenly, Walter's Taheen minions attack the village; Roland guns most of them down but is forced to return to New York for modern medical treatment. Jake learns the location of Walter's lab from a homeless man who helped him earlier, but when he tries to find his mother, he discovers only charred remains and breaks down crying. Seeing this, Roland vows to avenge her death and bonds with Jake by teaching him gun-fighting as well as the "Gunslinger's Creed", which he has not uttered since his own father's death.

Roland is ambushed by Walter while obtaining fresh ammunition at a gun store; Jake is captured and forced into a machine that will convert his "shine" into a beam capable of destroying the Tower. Through telepathy, Jake helps Roland find the base and buy time while Roland kills Sayre and most of the remaining Taheen in a brutal shootout. Walter faces Roland in personal combat and effortlessly disarms and wounds him using his magic. When Jake reminds him of the Gunslinger's Creed, Roland improvises a trick shot to disable Walter before swiftly killing him. Finally, he destroys the machine and saves the Dark Tower, Jake, and the other children.

Preparing to make a personal journey to the Tower itself, Roland offers Jake the chance to become his companion and an apprentice Gunslinger. Jake accepts, and they permanently leave New York for Mid-World.

== Cast ==
- Idris Elba as Roland Deschain, the last of the Gunslingers. On the choice of Elba, director and co-writer Nikolaj Arcel stated, "For me, it just clicked. He's such a formidable man." He added that he had been an admirer of Elba's since The Wire, and stated, "I had to go to Idris and tell him my vision for the entire journey with Roland and the ka-tet. We discussed, who is this character? What's he about? What's his quest? What's his psychology? We tried to figure out if we saw the same guy. And we absolutely had all the same ideas and thoughts. He had a unique vision for who Roland would be." Stephen King himself spoke highly of Elba, stating: "I love it. I think he's a terrific actor, one of the best working in the business now." On the character of Roland, King noted: "For me, the character is still the character. It's almost a Sergio Leone character, like the Man with No Name," while remarking, "He can be white or black, it makes no difference to me. I think it opens all kind of exciting possibilities for the backstory," despite Roland specifically being described as white in the books. Elba's performance was one of the few aspects of the film consistently praised by critics.
- Matthew McConaughey as Walter Padick, a ruthless deceiver and sorcerer who seeks to unleash eternal darkness into the world by bringing down the Tower. On the choice of McConaughey, Arcel stated, "Matthew is an incredible actor who can do anything. That's how I feel about [Walter]. He could do anything." About the character of Walter Padick, Arcel added, "He is this timeless sorcerer, and being a Stephen King fan, I've read and experienced Walter in various iterations," making reference to The Stand and The Eyes of the Dragon. "He has a very interesting way of seeing the world. He sees it with a sort of delight, even though he is obviously on the wrong side of the light-and-dark spectrum. He's someone I've been having a lot of fun with." King made mention of him never having a clear image of the character's face, to which he explained: "I never really thought of him. But [in the movie] he becomes a character who isn't just a mirage that Roland is chasing. The way things are set up, he's right there."
- Tom Taylor as Jake Chambers, a young boy whom Roland must call upon to complete his journey, and a son-like figure to Deschain. Taylor got the role after an international search.
- Claudia Kim as Arra, a seer enlisted to study Jake's visions
- Fran Kranz as Pimli, one of Walter's Taheen technicians
- Abbey Lee as Tirana, another of Walter's Taheen technicians
- Katheryn Winnick as Laurie, Jake's mother
- Nicholas Pauling as Lon, Jake's stepfather
- Jackie Earle Haley as Sayre, a Taheen enforcer serving Walter
- Michael Barbieri as Timmy, Jake's neighbor
- Eva Kaminsky as Jill, the fake clinic representative, sent by Walter to retrieve Jake
- Nicholas Hamilton as Lucas Hanson
- José Zúñiga as Dr. Hotchkiss
- Dennis Haysbert as Steven Deschain, Roland's father

== Production ==
=== Development and pre-production ===
The Dark Tower's protagonist Roland as depicted in the opening credits of another Stephen King adaptation, The Mist (2007)

==== J. J. Abrams (2007–2009) ====
By early February 2007, a film adaptation of The Dark Tower series was in the works. J. J. Abrams, co-creator of the television series Lost, was said to be attached to produce and direct. Carlton Cuse and Damon Lindelof, who co-created Lost with Abrams, optioned The Dark Tower from King for a reported amount of $19, a number that mysteriously recurs throughout the series. According to issue #923 of Entertainment Weekly, King "is an ardent supporter of [Lost] and trusts Abrams to translate his vision" into a film franchise, with Lindelof being "the leading candidate to write the screenplay for the first installment." It was around this time that Marvel Comics launched their graphic novel adaptation of The Dark Tower with The Dark Tower: The Gunslinger Born. Later, in March 2007, Abrams noted in an interview with Wired that the project is "something that we are just now talking about with Stephen, so it's too early for me to say that we're even officially doing it yet just because the thing is in the early stages of discussion."

A year later, in February 2008, Abrams reiterated that The Dark Tower adaptation was in the early stages of development, when interviewed by Reelz Channel. When interviewed by AMC in September 2008, Abrams admitted that the project needs time he does not have because of Lost, especially since he would like to see a seven-film series (the eighth novel was published in 2012). However, in May 2009, Abrams stated to IGN that he and Lindelof were planning on beginning work on The Dark Tower as soon as Lost finished its run. Speaking to MTV News around the same time, Lindelof revealed some apprehension regarding the project, noting that his "reverence for Stephen King is now getting in the way of what any good writer would do first when they're adapting a book, which is take creative license." In a July 2009 interview with C21 Media, Lindelof revealed that he and Cuse had indeed optioned the rights for The Dark Tower, but said he was wary about committing to such an ambitious project: "The idea of taking on something that massive again after having done six seasons of Lost is intimidating and slightly frightening, to say the least."

With these reservations being voiced by the producers, this initial phase of the project came to an end at the end of 2009 after three years, since this was a three-year option. In an interview with USA Today in October 2009, Damon Lindelof stated: "You'll be hard-pressed to find a huger fan of The Dark Tower than me, but that's probably the reason that I shouldn't be the one to adapt it. After working six years on Lost, the last thing I want to do is spend the next seven years adapting one of my favorite books of all time. I'm such a massive Stephen King fan that I'm terrified of screwing it up. I'd do anything to see those movies written by someone else. My guess is they will get made because they're so incredible. But not by me." Finally, in November 2009, Abrams stated that he would not be adapting the series. During an interview with MTV News, Abrams made the following comments: "The Dark Tower thing is tricky. The truth is that Damon and I are not looking at that right now."

==== Ron Howard and Universal Pictures (2010–2015) ====
In April 2010, five months after Abrams revealed he would no longer pursue his adaptation of The Dark Tower, Universal Pictures was set to produce a trilogy of feature films, alternating with two seasons of a television series to bridge gaps between the films. The involved parties included Akiva Goldsman writing the script, Ron Howard directing, and also producing with Brian Grazer and Stephen King. The report was made official by NBC Universal five months later via a press release dated September 8, 2010. In an interview with Entertainment Weekly following the announcement, King stated that "I always thought it would take more than a single movie, but I didn't see this solution coming—i.e., several movies and TV series. It was Ron [Howard] and Akiva [Goldsman]'s idea. Once it was raised, I thought at once it was the solution." A month later, the first Dark Tower film was scheduled to open on May 17, 2013. In December 2010, Howard offered the following in regards to the project's progress: "It is going well, and it has been incredibly stimulating to work on. I really can't stop thinking about it. We've been meeting and talking and I've been reading and researching and just kind of living with it. I hope it goes great. I hope it goes the way we think it will. It never does, really. But sometimes it goes better." Despite Howard's enthusiasm, Universal had not yet greenlit the project at that point.

By April 2011, Mark Verheiden was joining the television portion of the project as executive producer and Akiva Goldsman's co-writer. The same month, Javier Bardem was cast in the role of Roland. However, just a month later, a report in Variety revealed that Universal may seek another studio's help, as the project's budget appeared to be more than they were willing to handle. The Hollywood Reporter wrote later that the project was on the verge of turnaround, and Warner Bros. or Columbia Pictures could potentially take the project on, revealing that Universal had paid $5 million for the rights. Shortly after that, Universal committed to a lower budget for the project and Goldsman began rewriting the script to reflect these changes.

Originally, production was slated to begin in September 2011, but in May 2011 it was being pushed back to February 2012 or early spring. The project was still not greenlit by the studio, which had to happen by July 2011. Then on July 18, 2011, Universal decided to cancel development of the entire project due to budgetary concerns. Despite this, Stephen King was confident Howard would see the project through, stating that he was "sorry Universal passed, but not really surprised. I bear them no ill will, and trust Ron Howard to get Roland and his friends before the camera somewhere else. He's very committed to the project." Later, in October 2011, Howard confirmed the adaptation was still on track, noting that HBO would now carry the television portion of the project.

By March 2012, Warner Bros. was expressing interest in taking on the project. Several months later, Goldsman delivered a new script for the first film to Warner Bros., and the studio had to make a decision in August 2012 whether to go ahead with the project. As well, Russell Crowe was being talked about as the lead character. On August 20, 2012, Warner Bros. officially passed. At the same time, Media Rights Capital (MRC) was in talks to take over the project from Warner.

In January 2014, Aaron Paul stated that he had a conversation with Howard and was possibly being considered to play Eddie Dean (earlier, in October 2012, Paul had tweeted that the role of Eddie Dean was a "huge dream" of his). Following that, a rumor appeared that Liam Neeson was interested in the part of Roland.

==== Nikolaj Arcel, Media Rights Capital and Sony Pictures (2015–2017) ====
On April 10, 2015, it was announced that Sony Pictures Entertainment with MRC were fast-tracking the project, now with a completely reworked script by Goldsman and Jeff Pinkner. King appeared optimistic, saying: "I'm excited that The Dark Tower is finally going to appear on the screen." Howard appeared to be out as director, but would remain in a producing capacity. By June 2, 2015, Sony was looking to Nikolaj Arcel to direct. Arcel officially signed on July 10, 2015, with him and Anders Thomas Jensen rewriting the script. On August 5, 2015, Sony Pictures Entertainment set the film for a release of January 13, 2017. By November 2015, Matthew McConaughey had been offered the role of the Man in Black (also known as Randall Flagg from The Stand, another role McConaughey had been offered for the 2020 miniseries). McConaughey made between 1 and 1.5 million dollars for his role. In January 2016, it was officially announced that Idris Elba has been cast to play Roland Deschain. By February 18, 2016, Abbey Lee had been offered the role of Tirana. On March 1, 2016, Entertainment Weekly confirmed the casting of Idris Elba as Roland and Matthew McConaughey as The Man in Black, with shooting set to begin in South Africa in April. On March 5, Sony announced that the film would move back on the schedule from January 13 to February 17. By March 10, 2016, Tom Taylor had been cast as Jake Chambers.

=== Set design and weapons selection ===
Idris Elba's character uses weapons similar to the Remington Model 1858 revolver throughout the film, patented by Remington Arms in 1858.

=== Filming and post-production ===
Filming began on April 12, 2016. Abbey Lee, Jackie Earle Haley, and Fran Kranz were added to the cast when filming commenced, while Katheryn Winnick and Michael Barbieri joined the film at the end of April 2016, and Claudia Kim was cast as Arra Champignon in May 2016. After poor initial test screenings, Sony contemplated replacing Arcel with "a more experienced filmmaker," but instead producers Ron Howard and Akiva Goldsman advised Arcel on cleaning up the music and narrative of the film. Filming locations included the Karoo region of South Africa and the Werdmuller Centre in Cape Town.

== Release ==
Originally, the film was scheduled to be released on January 13, 2017, and was pushed back from its original release date to February 17, 2017. In November 2016, the film was pushed back again from February 17, 2017, to July 28, 2017, after the studio's Jumanji: Welcome to the Jungle was moved from that date. In late March 2017, the film was pushed back one week from July 28, 2017, to August 4, 2017, switching places with Sony Pictures Animation's The Emoji Movie.

=== Promotion ===
An unfinished rough cut of the first trailer was leaked online on October 10, 2016, but was later taken down almost all over the internet. On May 3, 2017, a full length trailer was released.

A one-minute television spot titled Connected KINGdom featured Easter eggs (media) of other Stephen King stories through the inter-dimensional setting of the titular location, the Dark Tower. Various references included The Shining (1980), Christine (1983), Cujo (1983), Misery (1990), The Shawshank Redemption (1994), Carrie and It.

== Reception ==
=== Box office ===
The Dark Tower grossed $50.7 million in the United States and Canada and $62.5 million in other territories for a worldwide total of $113.2 million.

In North America, The Dark Tower was released alongside the opening of Kidnap, as well as the wide expansion of Detroit, and was projected to gross around $20 million from 3,451 theaters in its opening weekend. It made $1.8 million from Thursday previews at 2,770 theaters, with screenings beginning at 7:19 p.m. as an ode to the 19:19 of Stephen King lore present in the book series, and $7.7 million on its first day. The film went on to debut to $19.1 million, dethroning two-time defender Dunkirk as the top film at the box office, although it was the second lowest gross for a film to finish number one in all of 2017. In its second weekend the film dropped 58.9% to $7.9 million, finishing 4th at the box office.

=== Critical response ===
Critics panned The Dark Tower, calling it "boring and flavorless" and "incomprehensible to newbies and wildly unfaithful and simplistic to fans of King's books." On Rotten Tomatoes, the film has an approval rating of 16% based on 278 reviews with an average rating of 4.1/10. The website's critical consensus reads, "Go then, there are other Stephen King adaptations than these." On Metacritic, the film has a weighted average score of 34 out of 100, based on 46 critics, indicating "generally unfavorable reviews". Audiences polled by CinemaScore gave the film an average grade of "B" on an A+ to F scale, while PostTrak reported that filmgoers gave a 69% overall positive score and a 43% "definite recommend".

TheWrap's Dan Callahan was critical of the film's sloppiness and poor editing by saying, "The 95-minute culmination of years-long efforts to bring The Dark Tower to the big screen is a complete disaster, a limp, barely coherent shell of a movie." Mike Ryan of Uproxx also criticized the incoherent plot, writing:

I've been told that The Dark Tower books are jam-packed with dense plot, wonderful characters, and a sprawling mythology—which is what made the movie so hard to make for all these years. Well, the solution seems to have been to just scrap all that and release a shockingly short 95-minute movie that just kind of glosses over everything to the point that has any meaning or purpose [sic].

Eric Vespe of Ain't It Cool News praised Elba's performance, but said the actor was let down by the decision to make Roland a supporting character: "That puts us in a weird position because Elba's a good Roland in a movie that doesn't allow him to actually embody the character in any meaningful way. He's undercut at every turn. The strongest stuff in the film is when Roland and Jake are bonding, but that relationship is so accelerated that there's no room for an arc."

Ignatiy Vishnevetsky of The A.V. Club maintained that the film was:

...ultimately done in by professionalism; it's a movie that doesn't seem to love itself, sidestepping its innate strangeness. [...] If you're making a movie about weaponized psychic kids, Luciferian wizards, and gun-nut knight-cowboys from another dimension, and your only goal is to get from act one to act three as efficiently as possible, what's the point?

Peter Travers of Rolling Stone described the film as a "major misfire" and an "unholy mess that shouldn't happen to a King, much less a paying customer". Writing for the Chicago Sun-Times, Richard Roeper panned the film, criticizing its cinematography, special effects and dialogue, referring to it as "dull", "mediocre" and "stilted" while calling Matthew McConaughey's performance as the lead villain "terrible" and calling it one of "the film's unfortunate elements".

Conversely, Aja Romano of Vox wrote that the film's disjointed narrative structure, favouring fast-paced action over exposition and backstory gave it a "basic, wondrous glee" that made it "feel more like a Stephen King film than any other Stephen King film since Stand By Me", and applauded its faithfulness to King's fictional multiverse, an idea ignored by most adaptations of King's books.

=== Creator responses ===
In an interview with Vulture, King suggested that the film's critical and commercial failure was due to its compression of the source material, and the decision to make the film for a PG-13 rating by toning down the violence of the novels. However, he also defended the film, claiming that screenwriter Goldsman "did a terrific job in taking a central part of the book and turning it into what I thought was a pretty good movie".

In an appearance on Josh Horowitz's podcast Happy Sad Confused promoting his film Pavarotti, Howard admitted to being dissatisfied with The Dark Tower. Believing that the film was not faithful to its source material due to lacking the novels' horror elements and by presenting the story as a "boy's own adventure" with Jake as the protagonist instead of Roland, he elaborated that "We always felt like we were kind of holding back something, and I think at the end of the day it was that". Explaining that these deviations from the books were "a sense of maybe too much listening to what you think the marketplace is calling for instead of really the essence of what Stephen King was giving us", Howard also expressed that the adaptation might have been more successful had it been made as a television series rather than a film.

While discussing the future of the franchise with The Hollywood Reporter interviewer James Hibberd, Goldsman said that "I have a lot of regret about the parts of that that didn't work out. Our best version of that existed well before television-movie crossovers and streaming were a thing. I have a lot of affection for the books that didn't end up onscreen [in the film]. And Ron Howard had this idea of what could be done across platforms — he didn't touch the movie, but sometimes things slip away. There are things about that [film] I still admire, and Idris Elba [played a] really wonderful Roland. I think there were too many different points of view — mine included — when it came to figuring out how to tell a cogent story onscreen, and we could have done better".

== Franchise ==
=== Sequel ===
Prior to the film being panned by critics, there was talk of a possible sequel. In an August 2017 interview with Collider, before the film was released into theatres, King expressed hope for a sequel film in addition to the television series by suggesting that it should be R-rated, have Roland wearing a hat and include the "lobstrosities" from The Dark Tower II: The Drawing of the Three. In a 2017 interview with ComingSoon.net, three days after its general release, Arcel confirmed that, if a sequel were made, The Drawing of the Three would form the basis of the sequel, and that Eddie and Susannah would appear alongside Elba, McConaughey, Taylor and Haley reprising their roles as Roland, Walter, Jake and Sayre respectively.

By 2019, producer Ron Howard was silent on any discussion of a sequel when he admitted that the film had failed to capture the basis of the Dark Tower source material, because they had tried to reduce it to PG-13 rather than the dark R-rated horror story it should have been. At that time, there were still discussions in play regarding a possible television series, on Amazon, as a way to move forward with adaptations of the Dark Tower novels.

=== Television series ===
In September 2016, The Dark Tower television series was scheduled to be released in 2018, with Glen Mazzara as showrunner. Elba and Taylor were set to reprise their roles as Roland and Jake respectively. The series was intended to provide the backstory of the film, being based on King's The Dark Tower IV: Wizard and Glass, The Dark Tower: The Wind Through the Keyhole and elements of The Dark Tower: The Gunslinger, with another actor playing young Roland, and Haysbert attached to return as Steven Deschain. Mazzara said that the series would explore "how Walter became the Man in Black, and how their rivalry cost Roland everything and everyone he ever loved", though McConaughey did not initially sign on for the series.

While discussing the development of the series in the aftermath of the negative critical response to the film, King expressed "we'll see what happens with that. It would be like a complete reboot, so we'll just have to see".

In February 2018, Amazon bought the rights to the series adaptation, though it was not made clear at first if Elba, Taylor or McConaughey would be involved. It was later confirmed that the series would serve as a reboot with Sam Strike and Jasper Pääkkönen being cast as Roland Deschain and The Man in Black respectively. In January 2020, it was confirmed Amazon decided not to move forward with the pilot, but that production company MRC was shopping the pilot scripts elsewhere.

In December 2022, director Mike Flanagan announced that he had acquired the rights to develop a television series based on the books and has plans for a multi-season release.
