= The Dark Tower: The Drawing of the Three / Revenge Sampler =

- Cover of The Dark Tower: The Drawing of the Three / Revenge Sampler (Jul., 2014)

Publication information
- Publisher: Marvel Comics
- Format: One-shot
- Publication date: Jul., 2014
- No. of issues: 1

Creative team
- Created by: Stephen King; Mike Kelley
- Written by: Robin Furth (adaptation); Peter David (script); Erica Schultz
- Artist(s): Piotr Kowalski, Julian Totino Tedesco, Christian Ward; Vincenzo Balzano, Dustin Nguyen

The Dark Tower: The Drawing of the Three / Revenge Sampler is a free, two-sided one-shot comic book preview published by Marvel Comics. It is the sixth non-sequential companion publication released as an extension of the comic book series based on Stephen King's The Dark Tower series of novels. Released five weeks in advance of the first issue of The Dark Tower: The Drawing of the Three - The Prisoner, The Drawing of the Three / Revenge Sampler features rough/black-and-white renditions of series artwork by Piotr Kowalski as well as cover art by Julian Totino Tedesco and variant cover art by Christian Ward. The flipside of the release features a preview of the graphic novel Revenge: The Secret Origin of Emily Thorne (based on the ABC television series Revenge), written by Erica Schultz with interior art by Vincenzo Balzano and cover art by Dustin Nguyen. The issue was published on July 30, 2014.

== Publication dates ==
- Issue #1: July 30, 2014

== See also ==
- The Dark Tower (comics)
