= The Dark Tower: The Long Road Home =

- Cover of The Dark Tower: The Long Road Home #1 (Mar., 2008)

Publication information
- Publisher: Marvel Comics
- Schedule: "Monthly"
- Format: Limited series
- Publication date: Mar. - Jul., 2008
- No. of issues: 5

Creative team
- Created by: Stephen King
- Written by: Robin Furth (adaptation); Peter David (script)
- Artist(s): Jae Lee; Richard Isanove

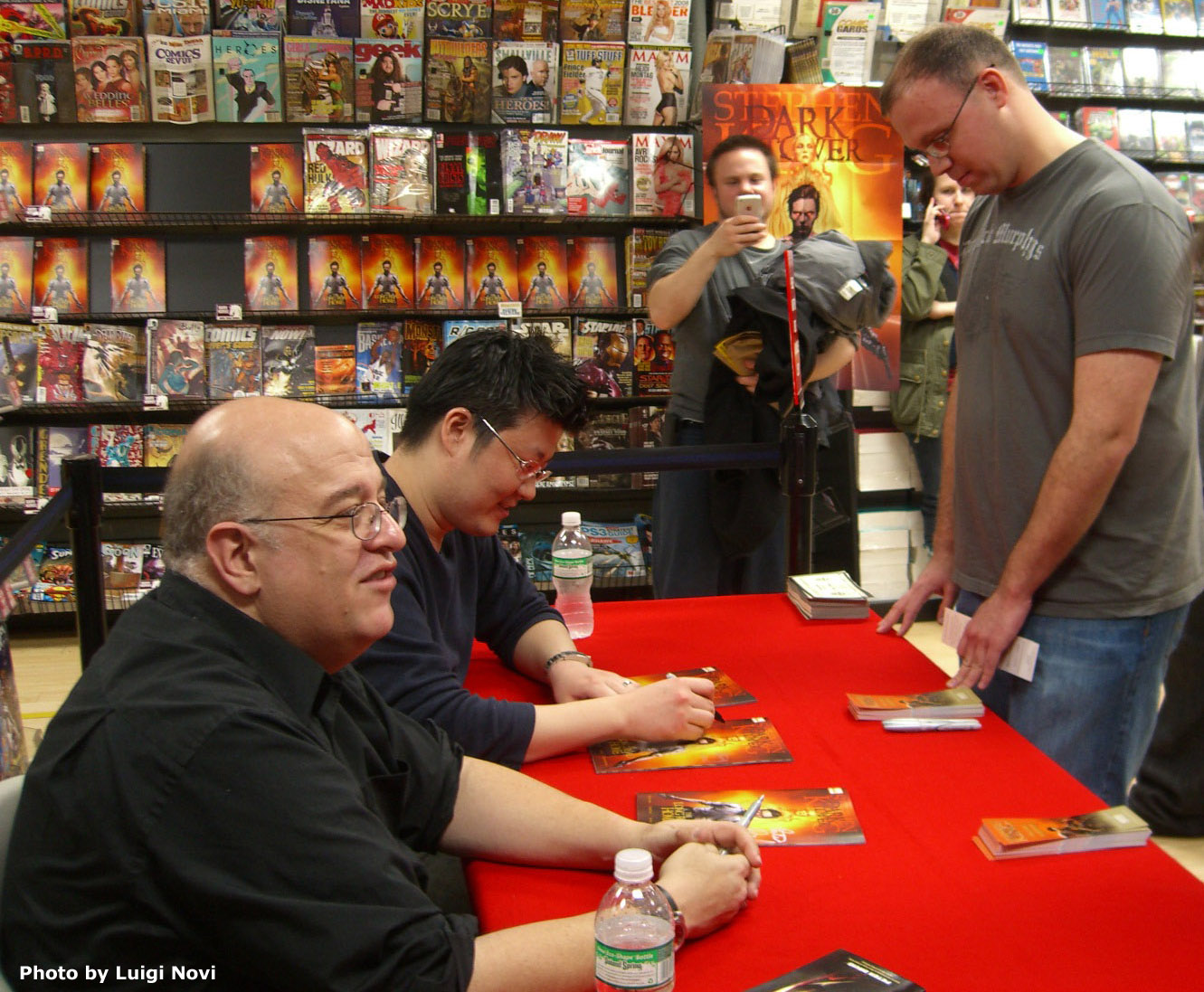
Peter David and Jae Lee at the midnight signing of the first issue at Midtown Comics Times Square, March 5, 2008.

The Dark Tower: The Long Road Home is a five-issue comic book limited series published by Marvel Comics. It is the second comic book miniseries based on Stephen King's The Dark Tower series of novels. It is plotted by Robin Furth, scripted by Peter David, and illustrated by Jae Lee and Richard Isanove. Stephen King serves as Creative and Executive Director of the project. The first issue was published on March 5, 2008.

The story depicts the title character of Roland Deschain as he returns to Gilead from Mejis. Whereas The Gunslinger Born was largely based on the events of The Dark Tower IV: Wizard and Glass, The Long Road Home showcases mostly new material not found in any of the novels.

The series is written and illustrated by the same creative team as The Gunslinger Born, which includes writers Robin Furth and Peter David, and illustrators Jae Lee and Richard Isanove. On March 5, 2008, David and Lee appeared at a midnight signing of the first issue of the series at Midtown Comics Times Square, as they had done the previous year with The Gunslinger Born.

== Publication dates ==
- Issue #1: March 5, 2008
- Issue #2: April 2, 2008
- Issue #3: May 7, 2008
- Issue #4: June 4, 2008
- Issue #5: July 2, 2008

== Plot ==
In continuation of the events of The Gunslinger Born, Roland Deschain and his ka-tet, Alain Johns and Cuthbert Allgood, are on the run from the Hambry posse, hoping to return to Gilead with Farson's prize, the evil seeing sphere known as Maerlyn's Grapefruit. The young gunslingers argue over Roland's insistence on carrying Susan Delgado's body to give it a proper burial, and during this, Roland shoots the Grapefruit. It transmogrifies into an enormous eyeball with tentacles that attach to Roland, drawing out his consciousness and into the sphere's dream-like realm, called End-World. There he encounters the spirits of the deceased Big Coffin Hunters. Alain and Cuthbert continue fleeing, carrying the unconscious Roland with them, barely escaping their pursuers via a dangerous river.

Meanwhile, a hapless, mentally challenged child named Sheemie, the village idiot of Hambry, and a friend of Roland, comes across a military control center called a Dogan (featured in the novel Wolves of the Calla), where his presence reactivates a long-dormant robot. The robot appears to electrocute Sheemie, filling him with energy in order to "experiment" on him. This act gives Sheemie the gift of telepathy, teleportation and rapid healing.

In the dream-like realm of End-World, Marten Broadcloak taunts Roland with the assertion that it is he whose machinations led to Roland's situation, and will lead to his eventual death. Alain and Cuthbert cross a dilapidated bridge with Roland's lifeless body, though at the cost of Cuthbert's horse, whom Bert is forced to euthanize, before destroying the bridge to elude the posse.

In End-World, Roland encounters a future version of himself as an adult. Broadcloak further taunts the young Roland with the assertion that his adult self killed his friends, and now walks alone on an endless path to the Dark Tower. Alain tries to reach Roland's mind with his psychic abilities, and is drawn into the realm, while Cuthbert fends off wolves from their camp. Alain is eventually ejected from the Grapefruit. Roland's body awakens, but apparently without the benefit of Roland's consciousness, and kills one of the wolves with its bare hands. Alain is again pulled briefly into the Grapefruit, from which he is again ejected after challenging Marten. As he reappears before Bert and the again-lifeless Roland, the trio are now confronted by a group of wolves. In fending off the wolves, Alain repeatedly shoots Sheemie, who has appeared at their camp. However, his wounds are instantly healed, and he also heals Alain's injuries. He then looks deep into the Grapefruit, and after mounting his mule, enters it.

In End-World, Marten delivers Roland to his master, the Crimson King, who tells Roland that they are both descended from Arthur Eld, and therefore, are akin to cousins. The Crimson King wants Roland to help him open the Dark Tower in order to destroy the many worlds spun from it, and restore the King's rightful kingdom of disorder and chaos, which he will rule with Roland. When Roland rebuffs his offer, the King tortures Roland with his magic, but is thwarted by Sheemie, who forces Roland out of the Grapefruit. Sheemie's whereabouts are unknown after this.

The trio return home to Gilead, where Roland's father, Steven, and the rest of the townsfolk are elated at their return, having been informed by agents of Farson that they had perished. Roland does not inform his father about the Grapefruit, which he keeps to himself. Alain and Cuthbert keep the secret out of loyalty, but fear that Roland is a changed man for his experiences, and that the young man they knew when they first set out to Hambry is lost to them.

== Reception ==
The first issue topped the March comic sales figures, with an estimated 123,807 sold, 20,000 more than the next comic, New Avengers.

== Related releases ==
- The Dark Tower: End-World Almanac

== Collected editions ==
The entire five-issue run of The Long Road Home was collected into a hardcover edition, released by Marvel on October 7, 2008 (ISBN 0785127097). A paperback edition was later released on October 20, 2010 (ISBN 0785127798). The series was also included in the hardcover release of The Dark Tower Omnibus on September 21, 2011 (ISBN 0785155414).

On August 28, 2018, Gallery 13 republished the original hardcover collection as Stephen King's The Dark Tower: Beginnings - The Long Road Home (Book 2) (ISBN 1982108231). On October 23, 2018, this edition (along with Books 1 and 3-5) was included in the boxed set Stephen King's The Dark Tower: Beginnings - The Complete Graphic Novel Series (ISBN 1982110201).

== See also ==
- The Dark Tower (comics)

Preceded by	Followed by
The Dark Tower: The Gunslinger Born	The Dark Tower: Treachery
