= Super Heroes of Europe =

Publication information
- Publisher: Marvel Comics
- First appearance: Sentry #4 (December 2000)
- Created by: Paul Jenkins and Jae Lee

Super Heroes of Europe is a fictional organization appearing in American comic books published by Marvel Comics.

== Fictional team history ==
Years ago, the nations of Europe founded the Super Heroes of Europe (S.H.E.), a coalition of European-based superhumans dedicated to defending the continent from all threats and acting as a peacekeeping force throughout the world. The statuesque Amazon served as the Ukraine's representative on the team. Representing Belgium, the Belgian Brain was a disembodied brain capable of genius-level computations and calculations. Claymore, Scotland's representative, was a master of ancient weaponry such as morningstar and various swords. Flying Carpet of Turkey was capable of flight, while Gunnar of Iceland possessed superhuman strength and durability. Other members of the coalition included Javelin of Finland, Magma of Sweden, Oracle of Greece, Red Dragon of Wales, Shamrock of Ireland, and Yvette of France.

Several of these representatives, such as long-time member the Red Dragon (Gareth Thomas), were killed by the Void. Some of the deceased members of S.H.E. were kept by the Void in his Antarctica base.

The organization survived the Void's attack and the affected nations chose new super-powered individuals to represent them in S.H.E. During the height of the Civil War, the behavior protocols within the nanites controlling the Green Goblin were tampered with, causing Osborn to slaughter a 20-man Atlantean sleeper cell that had been activated in New York City. The outraged Atlanteans insisted that their slaughtered agents were only in New York on a fact-finding mission to learn more about humanity and did not pose a threat to U.S. national security. In order to avert a military confrontation, S.H.E. brokered a deal between the Atlanteans and the U.S. government in which an Atlantean delegation led by Ambassador Govan would hold a conference on the Lower East Side Wharf in order to air their grievances in a public forum in accordance with Atlantean custom. Wales' new Red Dragon, Gareth Thomas' successor, was authorized by the State Department to act as a mediator while the Belgian Brain was slated to serve as translator for the event; however, as soon as the conference started, Norman Osborn emerged from the crowd and shot Ambassador Govan, who retreated back into the waters with his Atlantean delegation. Norman Osborn was quickly subdued by Iceland's Gunnar and placed in police custody.
