= The Dark Tower: Treachery =

Comic book limited series published by Marvel Comics

- Cover of The Dark Tower: Treachery #1 (Sep., 2008)

Publication information
- Publisher: Marvel Comics
- Schedule: "Monthly"
- Format: Limited series
- Publication date: Sep., 2008 - Feb., 2009
- No. of issues: 6

Creative team
- Created by: Stephen King
- Written by: Robin Furth (adaptation); Peter David (script)
- Artist(s): Jae Lee; Richard Isanove

The Dark Tower: Treachery is a six-issue comic book limited series published by Marvel Comics. It is the third comic book miniseries based on Stephen King's The Dark Tower series of novels. It is plotted by Robin Furth, scripted by Peter David, and illustrated by Jae Lee and Richard Isanove. Stephen King serves as Creative and Executive Director of the project. The first issue was published on September 10, 2008.

Whereas The Gunslinger Born was largely based on the events of The Dark Tower IV: Wizard and Glass, Treachery, like The Long Road Home, consists mostly of new material not found in any of the novels.

The story depicts the ka-tet of Roland Deschain, Alain Johns and Cuthbert Allgood dealing with the events following their return to Gilead from Hambry, including the toll that Maerlyn's Grapefruit has taken on Roland's health, his obsessive desire to continue peering into its depths, and the search for John Farson and the Big Coffin Hunters.

== Publication dates ==
- Issue #1: September 10, 2008
- Issue #2: October 8, 2008
- Issue #3: November 12, 2008
- Issue #4: December 24, 2008
- Issue #5: January 28, 2009
- Issue #6: February 25, 2009

== Plot ==
A momentous celebration is held in Gilead following the return of Roland Deschain, Alain Johns and Cuthbert Allgood from their successful mission in Hambry. Alain and Cuthbert are praised by Roland's father, Steven Deschain, the lord of Gilead, for accomplishing their mission, and are recognized as gunslingers. The two gunslingers, however, are worried about Roland, who is still obsessed with Maerlyn's Grapefruit, the mysterious seeing sphere that Roland acquired during their mission. They are conflicted over their decision to remain loyal to him by keeping his addiction to it a secret, rather than forcing Roland to turn it over to his father. Roland is also troubled by the Grapefruit, through which he is still taunted by the Crimson King.

A posse that includes the trio's fathers heads out on a mission to thwart John Farson. They come across a group of Farson's men whose loyalty to Farson is wavering. They are ambushed by the posse, and although most are killed, one is able to detonate a grenade. The explosion is observed at a distance by another Farson deserter, who is in turn killed by one of Farson's lieutenants. Charles Champignon, who shielded Steven from the grenade, is badly wounded. Steven applies the gunpowder from a bullet to his wound and ignites it, cauterizing the wound. They resolve to get Charles home to more proper medical attention before his pregnant wife gives birth.

In Gilead, Aileen Ritter; the niece of the gunslinger trainer Cort, laments how she is excluded from becoming a gunslinger because she is female. Cort wants to betroth her to Roland Deschain, but she would rather die than marry. She steals revolvers from Cort's armory to practice with them. When she joins the boys, Cuthbert dismisses her, but she gets the best of him by putting a bullet through his gun belt as he holds it in his hand. Cort is upset with Aileen for stealing from the armory, and for eschewing the traditional role of females with her gunslinger aspirations, but observes that she is just like her late mother, and resolves that she will choose her own path.

At a nunnery in Debaria called Our Lady of the Rose, Gabrielle Deschain attempts to atone for her infidelity to Steven with Marten Broadcloak, but Marten himself appears, and insists that he is the only one who loves and understands her. He convinces her to murder Steven, and makes her the false promise her that her son, Roland, will be unharmed. At the same time, Steven and his men attempt to strategize how to outflank John Farson, but Justus, their chief source of information on Farson's movements, is actually a spy in Farson's employ.

Within the Grapefruit, Roland sees a vision of Rhea of the Cöos, the witch behind Susan Delgado's death, arriving in Gilead, and murdering his father. Alain and Cuthbert manage to convince Roland to relinquish the Grapefruit to his father, which Roland does, apologizing to Steven for not doing so upon his return to Gilead. Steven is understanding of Roland's sin, due to the nefarious effect that the Grapefruit has on its victims, and tells Roland he will atone for his actions by showing forgiveness to his mother at the upcoming banquet. Roland begrudgingly agrees. Steven, rather than allowing the Grapefruit to seduce him as it did Roland, hides it in a safe, an act that is secretly observed by Justus, who informs Farson of this.

Alain and Cuthbert, observing that new gunslingers typically are seated next to the prospective brides selected by their fathers, ponder whether Roland will be seated next to Aileen at the upcoming banquet, but Roland, who is still mourning Susan Delgado, has no interest in the issue. Meanwhile, Gabrielle meets with Justus and Kingson, Farson's nephew, who works as a musician. They give her a dagger coated with a deadly poison with which she is to kill Steven, and instruct her to procure the key to the safe in which Steven placed the Grapefruit.

In Gilead, Abel Vannay the Wise, the gunslingers' philosophy teacher, crafts riddles for a competition at the upcoming banquet. Cort looks forward to the challenge, but both are interrupted by Kingson, who seeks to participate in the competition himself. Kingson later switches out Vannay's bag of riddles for his own, but his treachery is secretly witnessed by Cort.

At the banquet, Steven presents the three new gunslingers, and presents to his son the guns of Eld, which previously served Steven himself. Roland and Aileen share a dance, and later, a personal conversation outside, but when she kisses him, Roland pulls away, still mourning Susan. Kingson squares off against Cort in a competition of riddles, and appears to win the competition, but Cort accuses him of substituting Vannay's scrolls with ones that Kingson himself copied from older texts with poorly thought out, incorrect answers. Cort stabs him to death, and finds a signet ring on him, marking him as one of Farson's spies. Roland finds the Grapefruit missing from his father's vault, and then finds it in his mother's chambers. Gazing into it, he sees a reflection of Rhea of the Coos, approaching him from behind with a garrot. He turns and shoots the woman in the chest, but it turns out to be his mother, Gabrielle, holding a belt with Roland's name stitched into it that she was planning to leave him as a gift. Her last words before she expires are "Roland, I...I love thee.."

== Promotion ==
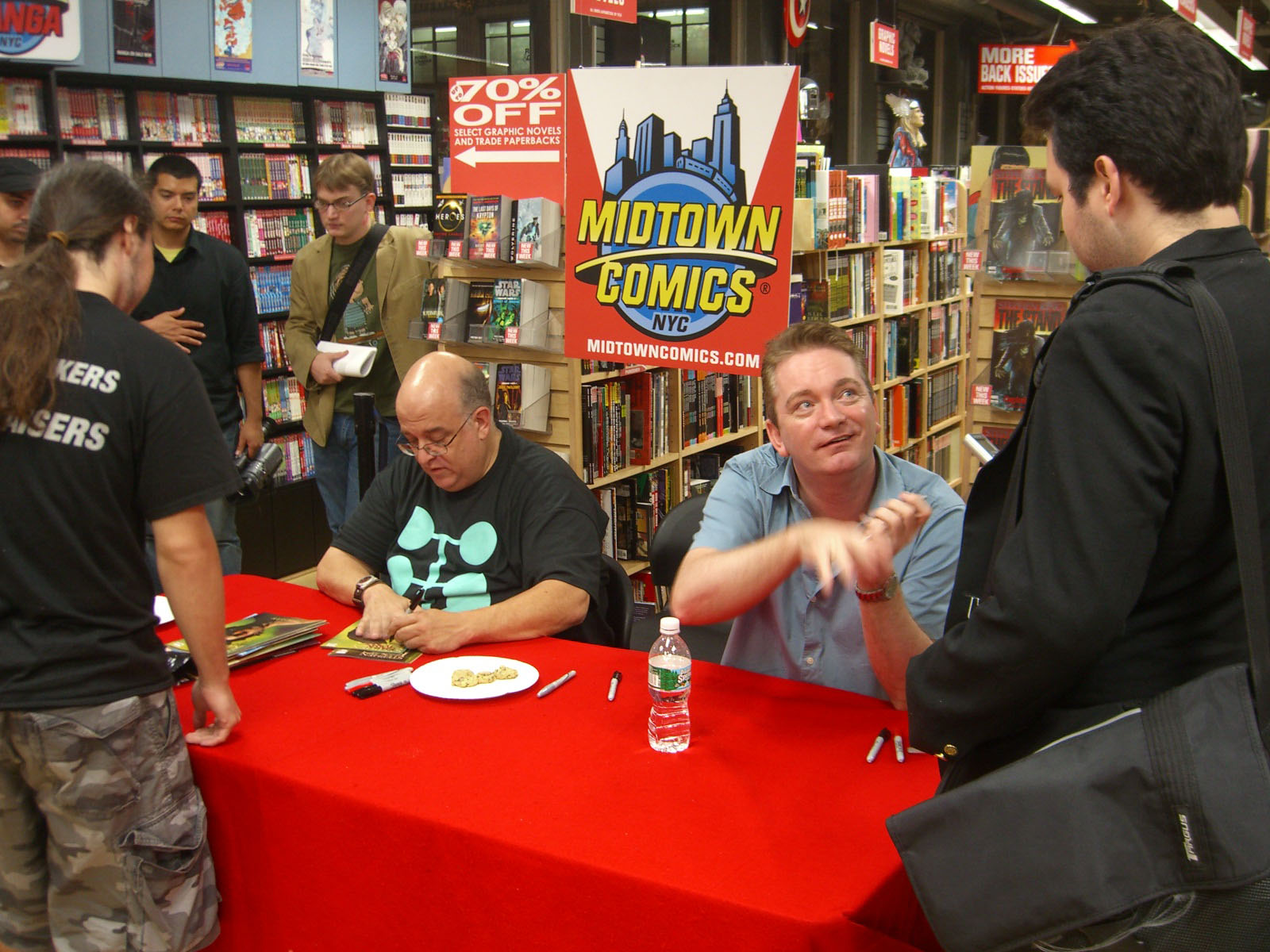
Writer Peter David and artist Mike Perkins, at the midnight signing of Treachery and The Stand: Captain Trips at Midtown Comics in Times Square, Manhattan, September 10, 2008. At far right is Alan Kistler of ComicMix, interviewing Perkins.

As with the previous two miniseries, writer Peter David appeared at a midnight signing at Midtown Comics in Times Square, Manhattan to promote the book. Artist Mike Perkins was also present to promote The Stand: Captain Trips, Marvel's comic book adaptation of Stephen King's novel, The Stand. Midtown, along with 80 other U.S. stores participating in the midnight launch, were given an exclusive Midnight Opening Variant of the first issue, which features a gatefold cover.

== Reception ==
The trade paperback collection of the series made the New York Times Graphic Books Best Seller List in May 2009.

== Collected editions ==
The entire six-issue run of Treachery was collected into a hardcover edition, released by Marvel on April 21, 2009 (ISBN 078513574X). A paperback edition was later released on March 16, 2011 (ISBN 0785135758). The series was also included in the hardcover release of The Dark Tower Omnibus on September 21, 2011 (ISBN 0785155414).

On September 11, 2018, Gallery 13 republished the original hardcover collection as Stephen King's The Dark Tower: Beginnings - Treachery (Book 3) (ISBN 1982108258). On October 23, 2018, this edition (along with Books 1-2 and 4-5) was included in the boxed set Stephen King's The Dark Tower: Beginnings - The Complete Graphic Novel Series (ISBN 1982110201).

== See also ==
- The Dark Tower (comics)

| Preceded by | Followed by |
|---|---|
| The Dark Tower: The Long Road Home | The Dark Tower: The Sorcerer |
