= The Dark Tower: The Gunslinger - The Battle of Tull =

- Cover of The Dark Tower: The Gunslinger - The Battle of Tull #1 (Jun., 2011)

Publication information
- Publisher: Marvel Comics
- Schedule: "Monthly"
- Format: Limited series
- Publication date: Jun. - Oct., 2011
- No. of issues: 5

Creative team
- Created by: Stephen King
- Written by: Robin Furth (adaptation); Peter David (script)
- Artist(s): Michael Lark, Stefano Gaudiano, Richard Isanove

The Dark Tower: The Gunslinger - The Battle of Tull is a five-issue comic book limited series published by Marvel Comics. It is the eighth comic book miniseries based on Stephen King's The Dark Tower series of novels. It is plotted by Robin Furth, scripted by Peter David, and illustrated by Michael Lark, Stefano Gaudiano, and Richard Isanove. Stephen King is the Creative and Executive Director of the project. The first issue was published on June 1, 2011.

Preceded by	Followed by
The Dark Tower: The Gunslinger - The Little Sisters of Eluria	The Dark Tower: The Gunslinger - The Way Station

== Publication dates ==
- Issue #1: June 1, 2011
- Issue #2: July 6, 2011
- Issue #3: August 3, 2011
- Issue #4: September 7, 2011
- Issue #5: October 5, 2011

== Collected editions ==
The entire five-issue run of The Battle of Tull was collected into a hardcover edition, released by Marvel on January 25, 2012 (ISBN 0785149333). A paperback edition was later released on May 7, 2013 (ISBN 0785149341). The series was also included in the hardcover release of The Dark Tower: The Gunslinger Omnibus on September 3, 2014 (ISBN 0785188703).

== See also ==
- The Dark Tower (comics)
