= The Dark Tower: Battle of Jericho Hill =

2009–2010 comic book limited series

- Cover of The Dark Tower: Battle of Jericho Hill #1 (Dec., 2009)

Publication information
- Publisher: Marvel Comics
- Schedule: "Monthly"
- Format: Limited series
- Publication date: Dec., 2009 - Apr., 2010
- No. of issues: 5

Creative team
- Created by: Stephen King
- Written by: Robin Furth (adaptation); Peter David (script)
- Artist(s): Richard Isanove, Jae Lee

The Dark Tower: Battle of Jericho Hill is a five-issue comic book limited series published by Marvel Comics. It the fifth comic book miniseries based on Stephen King's The Dark Tower series of novels. It is plotted by Robin Furth, scripted by Peter David, and illustrated by Richard Isanove and Jae Lee. Stephen King is the Creative and Executive Director of the project. The first issue was published on December 3, 2009.

The series tells the developments leading to the final battle between the gunslingers of Gilead and the forces of John Farson's rebellion.

Preceded by	Followed by
The Dark Tower: Fall of Gilead	The Dark Tower: The Gunslinger - The Journey Begins

== Publication dates ==
- Issue #1: December 3, 2009
- Issue #2: December 23, 2009
- Issue #3: February 10, 2010
- Issue #4: February 24, 2010
- Issue #5: April 21, 2010

== Plot ==
Gilead has fallen to John Farson and his forces. Roland Deschain and Gilead's few remaining survivors manage to escape the city through a secret exit. Not long after, a massive earthquake strikes and further damages the city. Alain informs the survivors it is no normal earthquake but rather a beamquake, meaning one of the six beams holding up the mythical Dark Tower has broken. Gilead was rumored to rest on the Eagle-Lion Beam and its destruction broke the beam. Roland decides as the leader of Gilead's survivors it is their mission to find the Dark Tower and use its power to set things right.

However, Roland and his ka-tet are uncertain which direction to travel along the beam. For nine years they wander unable to locate the Dark Tower as reality seems to be coming apart, time and space no longer being constant. In addition Roland has learned that the Crimson King is working to break the remaining five beams holding The Dark Tower. Unable to find The Dark Tower the ka-tet takes the fight directly to John Farson, by forming a resistance group and destroying several of his military installations.

The war between Roland and Farson take a turn when Randolph, member of Roland's ka-tet, loses his wife and his son is taken by a slow mutant. It is later revealed that this slow mutant was acting under orders from Marten. Marten is holding Randolph's family to force him to betray the resistance. Randolph leads Sheemie into a trap. Marten decides to keep Sheemie alive as his abilities make him too valuable.

After several more setbacks the ka-tet begins to suspect a traitor and attempts to keep sensitive information among the most trusted men. However, a mission to destroy a weapons cache ends in an ambush due to a false scouting report from Randolph. Alain is the only member to escape the ambush and realizes that Randolph is the traitor. As Alain is returning to camp, Roland and Cuthbert mistake him for an enemy soldier and Alain is fatally wounded. Alain is able to tell his friends that Randolph is the traitor before dying.

Roland and Cuthbert return to camp aware that it is only a matter of time before John Farson attacks their camp. Despite Randolph's helping Marten his wife and son are killed anyway. Out of despair for this family and betraying his friends, Randolph commits suicide. His last request is have his son buried with Alain so a true gunslinger will be able to take him to the clearing.

John Farson's army attacks the resistance encampment on Jericho Hill. The resistance is unable to retreat and is outnumbered by thousands. The ka-tet decides to fight on rather than ask for mercy. Early in the battle, Aileen is impaled by a spear and left for dead. Cuthbert is wounded next, but continues to fight. Jamie DeCurry is killed by taking a bullet for Roland. The twelve remaining gunslingers go on one final charge against Farson's army. Cuthbert blows the Horn of Eld and is killed by an arrow shot by Marten. Eventually all the gunslinger are shot down, including Roland.

Roland and the other gunslingers are thrown into a pile and left for dead. Sometime later, Roland stands up, wounded but alive and more determined than ever to reach the Dark Tower.

== Collected editions ==
The entire five-issue run of Battle of Jericho Hill was collected into a hardcover edition, released by Marvel on August 18, 2010 (ISBN 0785129537). A paperback edition was later released on May 9, 2012 (ISBN 0785129545). The series was also included in the hardcover release of The Dark Tower Omnibus on September 21, 2011 (ISBN 0785155414).

On October 9, 2018, Gallery 13 republished the original hardcover collection as Stephen King's The Dark Tower: Beginnings - The Battle of Jericho Hill (Book 5) (ISBN 1982108290). On October 23, 2018, this edition (along with Books 1-4) was included in the boxed set Stephen King's The Dark Tower: Beginnings - The Complete Graphic Novel Series (ISBN 1982110201).

== See also ==
- The Dark Tower (comics)
