= Michael Barbieri (actor) =

American actor

- Born: January 20, 2002 (age 24); New York City, New York
- Occupation: Actor
- Years active: 2016–present

Michael Barbieri is an American actor. He had roles in Little Men (2016), Spider-Man: Homecoming (2017), and The Dark Tower (2017).

Barbieri was born in New York City and is of Italian descent. He became interested in acting after seeing his brother, John, act in a school play. He gave up baseball to take acting classes. Afterwards, he got into the Lee Strasberg Acting School and soon auditioned for Little Men. His role in the film resulted in him getting signed to WME. He soon began booking roles for major films.

== Filmography ==
Year	Title	Role	Notes
2016	Killer	Pollack	Short
2016	Little Men	Tony Calvelli	
2016	Nunsense	Vinnie Prestrapini	TV Pilot
2017	Spider-Man: Homecoming	Charles Murphy	
2017	The Dark Tower	Timmy	
2022	Spider-Man: No Way Home	Charles Murphy	Extended cut of 2021 film; archive footage: post-credits scene
2022	Halloween Ends	Terry Tramer	
