= The Dark Tower (comics) =

Series of comic books

- Cover of The Dark Tower: The Gunslinger Born #1 (Feb., 2007)
- Created by: Stephen King

Publication information
- Publisher: Marvel Comics, Gallery 13
Title(s)
The Dark Tower: Beginnings
The Gunslinger Born
The Long Road Home
Treachery
The Sorcerer
Fall of Gilead
Battle of Jericho Hill
The Dark Tower: The Gunslinger
The Journey Begins
The Little Sisters of Eluria
The Battle of Tull
The Way Station
The Man in Black
Sheemie's Tale
Evil Ground
So Fell Lord Perth
The Dark Tower: The Drawing of the Three
The Prisoner
House of Cards
Lady of Shadows
Bitter Medicine
The Sailor
Companion releases
The Gunslinger Born Sketchbook
Marvel Spotlight: The Dark Tower
Gunslinger's Guidebook
End-World Almanac
Guide to Gilead
The Drawing of the Three / Revenge Sampler
- Formats: Original material for the series has been published as a set of limited series, graphic novels, and one-shot comics.
- Genre: Fantasy, science fiction, horror, western
- Main character(s): Roland Deschain; Alain Johns; Cuthbert Allgood; Jake Chambers; Eddie Dean; Susannah Dean

Creative team
- Writer(s): Robin Furth (adaptation); Peter David (script)
- Artist(s): Jae Lee; Richard Isanove; Dean White; Sean Phillips; Luke Ross; Michael Lark; Stefano Gaudiano; Laurence Campbell; Alex Maleev; Piotr Kowalski; Nick Filardi; Julian Totino Tedesco; Jonathan Marks; Lee Loughridge; Nimit Malavia; Juanan Ramirez; Cory Hamscher; Jesus Aburtov; Federico Blee; Jay Anacleto; Romulo Fajardo Jr.

The Dark Tower, first published in 2007, is a series of comic books (originally published by Marvel Comics and later republished by Gallery 13) based on Stephen King's The Dark Tower series of novels. Overall, it is plotted by Robin Furth and scripted by Peter David. Stephen King serves as Creative and Executive Director of the project.

== Overview ==
=== The Dark Tower: Beginnings ===
The first chapter run of the series, originally entitled simply The Dark Tower, launched February 7, 2007, and consisted of 30 issues that made up five volumes illustrated primarily by Jae Lee and Richard Isanove. The first volume, The Gunslinger Born, was based mostly on flashbacks from The Dark Tower: The Gunslinger and The Dark Tower IV: Wizard and Glass; the remaining volumes (The Long Road Home, Treachery, Fall of Gilead, and Battle of Jericho Hill) contained mostly new/original content which expanded upon details and events more briefly referenced throughout the novels. In addition to the five primary story arcs, the chapter run also included the one-shot, The Sorcerer. As stated by Peter David's afterword to The Long Road Home, the chapter run detailed Roland Deschain's "progress from callow youth to gunslinger," starting with his adventures in Mejis from Wizard and Glass and ending with the Battle of Jericho Hill (as detailed in The Dark Tower V: Wolves of the Calla and The Dark Tower VII: The Dark Tower). This series was re-titled by Papa Arpit The Dark Tower: Beginnings to clarify its prequel status when Gallery 13 took over as publisher.

=== The Dark Tower: The Gunslinger ===
The second chapter run, under the title of The Dark Tower: The Gunslinger, began May 9, 2010. It consisted of another 30 issues across five additional volumes written by Furth and David. Following Lee's departure from the series, this chapter run featured Isanove teaming with a different artist for each story arc. The first volume, The Journey Begins, took place 12 years after the Battle of Jericho Hill and mostly detailed events which occurred between the time of the battle and the start of the novel The Gunslinger. The second volume, The Little Sisters of Eluria, was based mostly upon the short story of the same name. The remaining volumes were largely adaptations of the novellas within The Gunslinger. The third, The Battle of Tull, was based mostly upon content from "The Gunslinger". The fourth, The Way Station, was based mostly upon "The Way Station" and "The Oracle and the Mountains". The fifth, The Man in Black, was based mostly upon "The Slow Mutants" and "The Gunslinger and the Dark Man". In addition to the five primary story arcs, two limited series (Sheemie's Tale and Evil Ground) and another one-shot (So Fell Lord Perth) were released as part of this chapter run.

=== The Dark Tower: The Drawing of the Three ===
The Dark Tower comics were planned to be finished after the August 7, 2013, release of So Fell Lord Perth. However, on April 25, 2014, a third chapter run, The Dark Tower: The Drawing of the Three, was announced. This chapter run, based primarily on the novel The Dark Tower II: The Drawing of the Three, began September 17, 2014. The series continued to be written by Furth and David but featured, for the first time, new, rotating artistic teams that did not feature Isanove. The volumes in this chapter run focused on the newly gathered (or 'drawn') members of Roland's ka-tet, as divided in the novel into sections based on the mysterious doors through which Roland must travel. The first and second volumes (The Prisoner and House of Cards) focused on Eddie Dean, who was introduced in the section of the novel also named "The Prisoner". The third and fourth volumes (Lady of Shadows and Bitter Medicine) focused on Odetta Holmes, who was introduced in the section of the novel named "The Lady of Shadows". The fifth volume (The Sailor) focused on Jake Chambers, who survived his original fate thanks to a change in the timeline (as shown in the section of the novel named "The Pusher") and resultantly struggled to find a way to return to Mid-World (as depicted in the first half of The Dark Tower III: The Waste Lands). This chapter run was the last to be published by Marvel Comics.

=== Collected editions and end of Marvel publication ===
On November 7, 2007, Marvel began publishing collections for each story arc, and on September 21, 2011, it began publishing hardcover omnibus editions collecting each chapter run, with bonus materials not contained in the original releases. However, only the first two chapter runs received the omnibus treatment; Marvel's publication of the series ended before an omnibus edition of The Dark Tower: The Drawing of the Three was released.

=== Gallery 13 republication ===
In 2018, Gallery 13 took over publication of the Dark Tower comics, beginning in August by republishing the collected graphic novels from the original chapter run of the series (rebranded as Stephen King's The Dark Tower: Beginnings), with the collected graphic novels from The Dark Tower: The Gunslinger chapter run set to be republished beginning spring 2019.

== List of original Marvel Comics chapter runs and story arcs ==
Arc #	Title	Issue(s)	Release date(s)	Plot	Script	Interior Art	Cover(s)*
The Dark Tower: Beginnings
1	The Gunslinger Born	7	February 7 - August 1, 2007	Robin Furth	Peter David	Jae Lee & Richard Isanove	Jae Lee & Richard Isanove
2	The Long Road Home	5	March 5 - July 2, 2008	Robin Furth	Peter David	Jae Lee & Richard Isanove	Jae Lee & Richard Isanove
3	Treachery	6	September 10, 2008 - February 25, 2009	Robin Furth	Peter David	Jae Lee & Richard Isanove	Jae Lee & Richard Isanove
-	The Sorcerer	1	April 15, 2009	Robin Furth	Robin Furth	Richard Isanove	Richard Isanove
4	Fall of Gilead	6	May 13 - November 25, 2009	Robin Furth	Peter David	Richard Isanove, Dean White	Richard Isanove, Jae Lee
5	Battle of Jericho Hill	5	December 3, 2009 - April 21, 2010	Robin Furth	Peter David	Jae Lee & Richard Isanove	Jae Lee & Richard Isanove
The Dark Tower: The Gunslinger
6	The Journey Begins	5	May 19 - September 22, 2010	Robin Furth	Peter David	Sean Phillips & Richard Isanove	Sean Phillips & Richard Isanove
7	The Little Sisters of Eluria	5	December 8, 2010 - April 13, 2011	Robin Furth	Peter David	Luke Ross & Richard Isanove	Luke Ross & Richard Isanove
8	The Battle of Tull	5	June 1 - October 5, 2011	Robin Furth	Peter David	Michael Lark, Stefano Gaudiano, Richard Isanove	Michael Lark & Richard Isanove
9	The Way Station	5	December 14, 2011 - April 25, 2012	Robin Furth	Peter David	Laurence Campbell & Richard Isanove	Laurence Campbell & Richard Isanove
10	The Man in Black	5	June 20 - October 17, 2012	Robin Furth	Peter David	Alex Maleev & Richard Isanove	Alex Maleev
-	Sheemie's Tale	2	January 9 - February 13, 2013	Robin Furth	Robin Furth	Richard Isanove	Richard Isanove
-	Evil Ground	2	April 3 - June 5, 2013	Robin Furth	Peter David	Richard Isanove, Dean White	Richard Isanove
-	So Fell Lord Perth	1	August 7, 2013	Robin Furth	Peter David	Richard Isanove	Richard Isanove
	The Dark Tower: The Drawing of the Three						
11	The Prisoner	5	September 3 - November 30, 2014	Robin Furth	Peter David	Piotr Kowalski & Nick Filardi	Julian Totino Tedesco
12	House of Cards	5	March 25 - July 15, 2015	Robin Furth	Peter David	Piotr Kowalski & Nick Filardi	Julian Totino Tedesco
13	Lady of Shadows	5	September 2, 2015 - January 20, 2016	Robin Furth	Peter David	Jonathan Marks & Lee Loughridge	Nimit Malavia
14	Bitter Medicine	5	April 20 - August 31, 2016	Robin Furth	Peter David	Jonathan Marks & Lee Loughridge	Nimit Malavia
15	The Sailor	5	October 12, 2016 - February 8, 2017	Robin Furth	Peter David	Juanan Ramirez, Cory Hamscher, Jesus Aburtov, Federico Blee	Jay Anacleto & Romulo Fajardo Jr.

Notes

- Cover artists listed are for primary first-printing cover art, not additional printings and/or variant covers.

== List of original Marvel Comics companion releases ==
Vol #	Title	Issue(s)	Release date(s)
-	The Dark Tower: The Gunslinger Born Sketchbook	1	December 13, 2006
-	Marvel Spotlight: The Dark Tower	1	January 31, 2007
-	The Dark Tower: Gunslinger's Guidebook	1	August 1, 2007
-	The Dark Tower: End-World Almanac	1	July 2, 2008
-	The Dark Tower: Guide to Gilead	1	April 8, 2009
-	The Dark Tower: The Drawing of the Three / Revenge Sampler	1	July 30, 2014

== List of original Marvel Comics collected editions ==
=== Story arc collections ===
Vol #	Title	Format	ISBN	Release date	Collected material
The Dark Tower: Beginnings
1	The Dark Tower: The Gunslinger Born	Hardcover	0785121447	November 7, 2007	The Dark Tower: The Gunslinger Born #1-7
1	The Dark Tower: The Gunslinger Born	Paperback	0785121455	May 19, 2010	The Dark Tower: The Gunslinger Born #1-7
2	The Dark Tower: The Long Road Home	Hardcover	0785127097	October 7, 2008	The Dark Tower: The Long Road Home #1-5
2	The Dark Tower: The Long Road Home	Paperback	0785127798	October 20, 2010	The Dark Tower: The Long Road Home #1-5
3	The Dark Tower: Treachery	Hardcover	078513574X	April 21, 2009	The Dark Tower: Treachery #1-6
3	The Dark Tower: Treachery	Paperback	0785135758	March 16, 2011	The Dark Tower: Treachery #1-6
4	The Dark Tower: Fall of Gilead	Hardcover	0785129510	February 23, 2010	The Dark Tower: The Sorcerer #1 and Fall of Gilead #1-6
4	The Dark Tower: Fall of Gilead	Paperback	0785129529	November 2, 2011	The Dark Tower: The Sorcerer #1 and Fall of Gilead #1-6
5	The Dark Tower: Battle of Jericho Hill	Hardcover	0785129537	August 18, 2010	The Dark Tower: Battle of Jericho Hill #1-5
5	The Dark Tower: Battle of Jericho Hill	Paperback	0785129545	May 9, 2012	The Dark Tower: Battle of Jericho Hill #1-5
The Dark Tower: The Gunslinger
6	The Dark Tower: The Gunslinger - The Journey Begins	Hardcover	0785147098	January 25, 2011	The Dark Tower: The Gunslinger - The Journey Begins #1-5
6	The Dark Tower: The Gunslinger - The Journey Begins	Paperback	0785147101	November 14, 2012	The Dark Tower: The Gunslinger - The Journey Begins #1-5
7	The Dark Tower: The Gunslinger - The Little Sisters of Eluria	Hardcover	0785149317	June 22, 2011	The Dark Tower: The Gunslinger - The Little Sisters of Eluria #1-5
7	The Dark Tower: The Gunslinger - The Little Sisters of Eluria	Paperback	0785149325	January 29, 2013	The Dark Tower: The Gunslinger - The Little Sisters of Eluria #1-5
8	The Dark Tower: The Gunslinger - The Battle of Tull	Hardcover	0785149333	January 25, 2012	The Dark Tower: The Gunslinger - The Battle of Tull #1-5
8	The Dark Tower: The Gunslinger - The Battle of Tull	Paperback	0785149341	May 7, 2013	The Dark Tower: The Gunslinger - The Battle of Tull #1-5
9	The Dark Tower: The Gunslinger - The Way Station	Hardcover	078514935X	June 27, 2012	The Dark Tower: The Gunslinger - The Way Station #1-5
9	The Dark Tower: The Gunslinger - The Way Station	Paperback	0785149368	July 30, 2013	The Dark Tower: The Gunslinger - The Way Station #1-5
10	The Dark Tower: The Gunslinger - The Man in Black	Hardcover	0785149376	January 15, 2013	The Dark Tower: The Gunslinger - The Man in Black #1-5
10	The Dark Tower: The Gunslinger - The Man in Black	Paperback	0785149384	October 29, 2013	The Dark Tower: The Gunslinger - The Man in Black #1-5
11	The Dark Tower: The Gunslinger - Last Shots	Paperback*	0785149414	October 8, 2013	The Dark Tower: The Gunslinger - Sheemie's Tale #1-2, Evil Ground #1-2, and So Fell Lord Perth #1
The Dark Tower: The Drawing of the Three
12	The Dark Tower: The Drawing of the Three - The Prisoner	Paperback	0785191577	March 10, 2015	The Dark Tower: The Drawing of the Three - The Prisoner #1-5
13	The Dark Tower: The Drawing of the Three - House of Cards	Paperback	0785192816	September 22, 2015	The Dark Tower: The Drawing of the Three - House of Cards #1-5
14	The Dark Tower: The Drawing of the Three - Lady of Shadows	Paperback	0785192824	March 29, 2016	The Dark Tower: The Drawing of the Three - Lady of Shadows #1-5
15	The Dark Tower: The Drawing of the Three - Bitter Medicine	Paperback	0785192808	October 18, 2016	The Dark Tower: The Drawing of the Three - Bitter Medicine #1-5
16	The Dark Tower: The Drawing of the Three - The Sailor	Paperback	0785192840	May 9, 2017	The Dark Tower: The Drawing of the Three - The Sailor #1-5

Notes

- Story arc collections 1-10 originally were made available in both hardcover and softcover (paperback) formats. Beginning with collection 11, the only printed edition released was a paperback format (this did not apply to the omnibus editions, which continued to be released solely in hardcover).

=== Omnibus collections ===
Vol #	Title	Format	ISBN	Release date	Collected material
The Dark Tower: Beginnings
1	The Dark Tower Omnibus	Hardcover	0785155414	September 21, 2011	Story arc collections 1-5
1	The Dark Tower Omnibus Companion	Hardcover	0785155414	September 21, 2011	Bonus material not included in the original individual collections (1-5)
The Dark Tower: The Gunslinger
2	The Dark Tower: The Gunslinger Omnibus	Hardcover	0785188703	September 3, 2014	Story arc collections 6-11
2	The Dark Tower: The Gunslinger Omnibus Companion	Hardcover	0785188703	September 3, 2014	Bonus material not included in the original individual collections (6-11)

== List of Gallery 13 republished collected editions ==
=== Story arc collections ===
Vol #	Title	Format	ISBN	Release date	Collected material
Stephen King's The Dark Tower: Beginnings
1	The Gunslinger Born (Book 1)	Hardcover	1982108207	August 28, 2018	The Dark Tower: The Gunslinger Born #1-7
2	The Long Road Home (Book 2)	Hardcover	1982108231	August 28, 2018	The Dark Tower: The Long Road Home #1-5
3	Treachery (Book 3)	Hardcover	1982108258	September 11, 2018	The Dark Tower: Treachery #1-6
4	The Fall of Gilead (Book 4)	Hardcover	1982108274	September 25, 2018	The Dark Tower: The Sorcerer #1 and Fall of Gilead #1-6
5	The Battle of Jericho Hill (Book 5)	Hardcover	1982108290	October 9, 2018	The Dark Tower: Battle of Jericho Hill #1-5
Stephen King's The Dark Tower: The Gunslinger
6	The Journey Begins (Book 1)	Hardcover	198210984X	February 5, 2019	The Dark Tower: The Gunslinger - The Journey Begins #1-5
7	The Little Sisters of Eluria (Book 2)	Hardcover	1982109866	March 5, 2019	The Dark Tower: The Gunslinger - The Little Sisters of Eluria #1-5
8	The Battle of Tull (Book 3)	Hardcover	1982109882	April 2, 2019	The Dark Tower: The Gunslinger - The Battle of Tull #1-5
9	The Way Station (Book 4)	Hardcover	1982109904	May 7, 2019	The Dark Tower: The Gunslinger - The Way Station #1-5
10	The Man in Black (Book 5)	Hardcover	1982109920	June 4, 2019	The Dark Tower: The Gunslinger - The Man in Black #1-5
11	Last Shots (Book 6)	Hardcover	1982109947	July 2, 2019	The Dark Tower: The Gunslinger - Sheemie's Tale #1-2, Evil Ground #1-2, and So Fell Lord Perth #1
Stephen King's The Dark Tower: The Drawing of the Three
12	The Prisoner (Book 1)	Hardcover	1982135298	March 24, 2020	The Dark Tower: The Drawing of the Three - The Prisoner #1-5
13	House of Cards (Book 2)	Hardcover	198213531X	April 21, 2020	The Dark Tower: The Drawing of the Three - House of Cards #1-5
14	The Lady of Shadows (Book 3)	Hardcover	1982135336	May 19, 2020	The Dark Tower: The Drawing of the Three - The Lady of Shadows #1-5
15	Bitter Medicine (Book 4)	Hardcover	1982135352	June 16, 2020	The Dark Tower: The Drawing of the Three - Bitter Medicine #1-5

=== Boxed set collections ===
Vol #	Title	Format	ISBN	Release date	Collected material
Stephen King's The Dark Tower: Beginnings
1	Stephen King's The Dark Tower: Beginnings - The Complete Graphic Novel Series	Hardcover	1982110201	October 23, 2018	Story arc collections 1-5
Stephen King's The Dark Tower: The Gunslinger
2	Stephen King's The Dark Tower: The Gunslinger - The Complete Graphic Novel Series	Hardcover	1982123168	October 22, 2019	Story arc collections 6-11
Stephen King's The Dark Tower: The Drawing of the Three
3	Stephen King's The Dark Tower: The Drawing of the Three - The Complete Graphic Novel Series	Hardcover	1982135468	October 20, 2020	Story arc collections 12-15

=== Omnibus collections ===
Vol #	Title	Format	ISBN	Release date	Collected material
Stephen King's The Dark Tower: Beginnings
1	Stephen King's The Dark Tower: Beginnings Omnibus	Hardcover	1982108312	May 1, 2020	Story arc collections 1-5 + bonus material
Stephen King's The Dark Tower: The Gunslinger
2	Stephen King's The Dark Tower: The Gunslinger Omnibus	Hardcover	1668021218	October 24, 2023	Story arc collections 6-11 + bonus material

== See also ==
- The Stand (comics)
