= The Dark Tower: The Gunslinger - The Little Sisters of Eluria =

Comic book series by Marvel Comics

- Cover of The Dark Tower: The Gunslinger - The Little Sisters of Eluria #1 (Dec., 2010)

Publication information
- Publisher: Marvel Comics
- Schedule: "Monthly"
- Format: Limited series
- Publication date: Dec., 2010 - Apr., 2011
- No. of issues: 5

Creative team
- Created by: Stephen King
- Written by: Robin Furth (adaptation); Peter David (script)
- Artist(s): Richard Isanove, Luke Ross

The Dark Tower: The Gunslinger - The Little Sisters of Eluria is a five-issue comic book limited series published by Marvel Comics. It is the seventh comic book miniseries based on Stephen King's The Dark Tower series of novels. Unlike the majority of the other comics which were based either on the novels or original material that expanded upon plot points from them, this miniseries is not based upon any of the novels, but on the novella The Little Sisters of Eluria which was published in several anthologies before being included in the 2009 revised edition of The Gunslinger. It is plotted by Robin Furth, scripted by Peter David, and illustrated by Richard Isanove and Luke Ross. Stephen King is the Creative and executive director of the project. The first issue was published on December 8, 2010.

Preceded by	Followed by
The Dark Tower: The Gunslinger - The Journey Begins	The Dark Tower: The Gunslinger - The Battle of Tull

== Publication dates ==
- Issue #1: December 8, 2010
- Issue #2: January 12, 2011
- Issue #3: February 9, 2011
- Issue #4: March 16, 2011
- Issue #5: April 13, 2011

== Summary ==
A battle with mutants leaves Roland injured and in the care of a small, strange clinic. However, the nurses are more of a danger than the mutants ever were.

== Collected editions ==
The entire five-issue run of The Little Sisters of Eluria was collected into a hardcover edition, released by Marvel on June 22, 2011 (ISBN 0785149317). A paperback edition was later released on January 29, 2013 (ISBN 0785149325). The series was also included in the hardcover release of The Dark Tower: The Gunslinger Omnibus on September 3, 2014 (ISBN 0785188703).

== See also ==
- The Dark Tower (comics)
