= The Dark Tower: The Gunslinger - The Journey Begins =

- Cover of The Dark Tower: The Gunslinger - The Journey Begins #1 (May, 2010)

Publication information
- Publisher: Marvel Comics
- Schedule: "Monthly"
- Format: Limited series
- Publication date: May - Sep., 2010
- No. of issues: 5

Creative team
- Created by: Stephen King
- Written by: Robin Furth (adaptation); Peter David (script)
- Artist(s): Richard Isanove, Sean Phillips

The Dark Tower: The Gunslinger - The Journey Begins is a five-issue comic book limited series published by Marvel Comics. It is the sixth comic book miniseries based on Stephen King's The Dark Tower series of novels. It is plotted by Robin Furth, scripted by Peter David, and illustrated by Richard Isanove and Sean Phillips. Stephen King is the Creative and Executive Director of the project. The first issue was published on May 19, 2010.

Preceded by	Followed by
The Dark Tower: Battle of Jericho Hill	The Dark Tower: The Gunslinger - The Little Sisters of Eluria

== Publication dates ==
- Issue #1: May 19, 2010
- Issue #2: June 16, 2010
- Issue #3: July 21, 2010
- Issue #4: August 18, 2010
- Issue #5: September 22, 2010

== Plot ==
The Man in Black is fleeing across the Desert and challenges Roland to catch him.

In pursuit of the Man in Black Roland first encounters an old man who gives Roland a compass. Later Roland stumbles onto a dwelling owned by a man named Brown. Brown informs Roland that the Man in Black did pass through, but Brown cannot say how long ago it was because time has become difficult to determine. Roland stays the night with Brown, but is unsure if Brown is real or an enchantment created by the Man in Black. Roland agrees to tell Brown part of his story starting with Jericho Hill.

After John Farson's victory at Jericho Hill the bodies of the gunslingers are being placed on pyre. Roland, thought to be dead, regains consciousness and escapes the pyre by knocking out a drunken guard. Vowing to take revenge for the death of his friend, Roland is surprised to see Aileen is still alive.

Together the two escape the enemy camp, but Aileen refuses to continue the fight against Farson as she believes her wounds are still mortal. Roland promises to take her back to the ruins of Gilead so she can be buried in her family crypt.

Dragging Aileen back to Gilead on a gurney Roland stumbles onto a merchant's wagon that had been attacked. The only survivor of the attack is a billy-bumbler. The billy-bumbler, which is capable of some speech, says its master was killed by "Not-Men".

Later that night Roland is attacked by these Not-Men who have the ability to turn invisible. Roland is rescued by the billy-bumbler and is able to defeat the Not-Men but Aileen is hit by a dart tipped with poison and dies.

Roland and the bumbler (Billy) reach the ruins of Gilead and Roland places Aileen's body in her Uncle Cort's coffin. While investigating the ruins further, Roland and Billy stumble onto a pack of slow mutants attacking a family of billy-bumblers. Roland defends the bumblers by helping kill all the mutants. After the battle Roland encounters the ghost of Hax

Hax was Gilead's former cook who was hanged years ago for plotting to poison children for John Farson. Roland flashes back to his adolescences and his first experience with death. Roland and Cuthbert had overheard Hax plan to poison children and reported the treachery to Roland's father. Hax was hung because of Roland's accusations. Hax's ghost expresses regret for what his past.

While touring more of the ruins of Gilead, Roland begins to think of all those he has lost over the years when Martin (the Man in Black) appears. Roland attempts to shoot Martin, but the bullets are blocked by magic. Martin claims to be able to help Roland to reach the Dark Tower. Martin vanishes, and Roland begins his quest to find him, believing Martin is his best resource for finding the Tower.

Weeks later Roland and Billy come to the fortified city of Kingstown. A public hanging of a Not-man is scheduled. While waiting for the hanging Roland believes he sees the long dead Susan, but loses her in the crowd. As the Not-man is being hung, Roland overhears a second Not-Man and attempts to capture him for the townsfolk.

After failing to catch the Not-Man Roland enters a tavern and is served by the girl that looks exactly like Susan Delgado. The girl's name is in fact "Susan" but not the one Roland used to know. Susan tells Roland that Not-Men have been stealing women, many of them her friends, ever since Farson's men came through the territory looking for weapons.

Later that night Susan herself is taken by the Not-Men. Roland promises to prevent history from repeating itself and goes after Susan. Billy leads Roland to the Not-Men's lair by following Susan's scent. There Roland learns the Not-Men use technology to turn invisible. Several women are being held against their will with restraining collars.

Roland manages to free the girls, who help him kill most of the now visible Not-Men. Using his sense of smell Billy is able to help track many of the still invisible Not-Men. The last surviving Not-Man takes Susan hostage and uses her as a human shield. Billy attacks this Not-Man, but is thrown against a tree limb and impaled. Roland shoots the last Not-man and Billy dies from his wound soon after.

With the death of another friend, Roland only spends a single night with Susan before moving on to his next quest. In the present Roland informs Brown that anyone close to him dies. However Roland also admits to feeling better after telling his story. Having finished his story Roland continues his search for the Man in Black.

== Collected editions ==
The entire five-issue run of The Journey Begins was collected into a hardcover edition, released by Marvel on January 25, 2011 (ISBN 0785147098). A paperback edition was later released on November 14, 2012 (ISBN 0785147101). The series was also included in the hardcover release of The Dark Tower: The Gunslinger Omnibus on September 3, 2014 (ISBN 0785188703).

== See also ==
- The Dark Tower (comics)
