= The Dark Tower: The Gunslinger Born =

2007 comic book limited series

- Cover of The Dark Tower: The Gunslinger Born #1 (Feb. 2007)

Publication information
- Publisher: Marvel Comics
- Schedule: Monthly
- Format: Limited series
- Publication date: Feb. – Aug. 2007
- No. of issues: 7

Creative team
- Created by: Stephen King
- Written by: Robin Furth (adaptation); Peter David (script)
- Artist(s): Jae Lee and Richard Isanove

The Dark Tower: The Gunslinger Born is a seven-issue comic book limited series published by Marvel Comics. It is the first comic book miniseries based on Stephen King's The Dark Tower series of novels. It is plotted by Robin Furth, scripted by Peter David, and illustrated by Jae Lee and Richard Isanove. Stephen King serves as Creative and Executive Director of the project. The first issue was published on February 7, 2007.

== Overview ==
The first issue of The Gunslinger Born was released at midnight on February 7, 2007. Creators Peter David and Jae Lee, and Marvel Editor-in-Chief Joe Quesada appeared at a midnight signing at a Times Square, New York City comic book store to promote it.

The Gunslinger Born is an expansion and interpretation of events covered in The Dark Tower series, beginning with Roland Deschain's manhood test against Cort and ending with the last events of the flashback sequences in Wizard and Glass. Furth indicated that later arcs would "cover the time period between Roland leaving Hambry and the fall of Gilead".

== Issues ==
Issue	Released	Summary	Special Features
#1	Feb 7, 2007	During Roland's flight across the Mohaine Desert he recalls the treachery of Marten Broadcloak, the sin of his mother, his test of manhood against his teacher Cort, and the night that followed.	A prose story in which Roland's teacher, Vannay, demonstrates to the boys the power and significance of The Beam.
#2	Mar 7, 2007	Roland's father, Steven, returns with a plan to send Roland, Cuthbert, and Alain to Hambry in the east, the true form of the Crimson King is revealed, and Marten flees Gilead after escaping arrest.	A prose story about Roland's ancestry and the creation of Maerlyn's Rainbow as well as the birth of the Crimson King, and an open letter from Stephen King.
#3	Apr 4, 2007	Roland and friends have fled for the city of Hambry, as their home in Gilead is now too dangerous. But, once there, Roland learns to his horror that he is no safer. Hambry's leaders have switched allegiance and the assassins known as the Big Coffin Hunters have marked Roland and company for death.	A prose story about the origin of the gunslingers' shooters, and part one of a Comic-Con Q&A including those involved in creating the series.
#4	May 2, 2007	Roland seems willing to put his friends in deadly danger by staying in Hambry when his relationship with Susan Delgado deepens. Meanwhile, Marten Broadcloak's agents — also known as the Big Coffin Hunters — are zeroing in for the kill on Roland and his ka-tet.	Part one of a prose story about Maerlyn's Laughing Mirror, an article on the process of making each page of the comics, and part two of the Comic-Con Q&A.
#5	Jun 6, 2007	Just outside Hambry, Roland makes a monstrous discovery: John Farson and his men have stolen the weapons of the Great Old Ones and now have the oil to power them and launch an attack against the Affiliation—a group which counts among its members Roland's father, Steven Deschain. And, at just the wrong time, the young gunslinger's ka-tet may be splintering, when Cuthbert accuses Roland of cowardice and rides off on his own.	Part two and three of the prose story about Maerlyn's Laughing Mirror, in which the origins of both Rhea and Jonas's evils are revealed, and the third and final part of the Comic-Con Q&A.
#6	Jul 5, 2007	The Affiliation, the group composed of Roland's father and his forces, are being lured into a fatal trap in the Shaved Mountains. With the Great Old Ones' weapons fired up by Hambry's oil, the Affiliation will be wiped out—unless Roland Deschain—the Gunslinger—can intercede in time.	Part one of the prose story about the history of Charyou Tree, and an illustrated description of Gunslinger's guns.
#7	Aug 1, 2007	Roland and his ka-tet have their long-awaited showdown with Eldred Jonas and the Big Coffin Hunters; Rhea's plan finally comes to fruition with deadly results; Roland Deschain's love affair with Susan Delgado comes to a tragic conclusion.	Part two of the prose story about the history of Charyou Tree.

== Related releases ==
- The Dark Tower: The Gunslinger Born Sketchbook (December 2006)
- Marvel Spotlight: The Dark Tower (January 2007)
- The Dark Tower: Gunslinger's Guidebook (August 2007)

== Collected editions ==
The entire seven-issue run of The Gunslinger Born was collected into a hardcover edition, released by Marvel on November 7, 2007 (ISBN 0-7851-2144-7), though it does not include the prose work that ran in the individual issues. A paperback edition was later released on May 19, 2010 (ISBN 0-7851-2145-5). The series was also included in the hardcover release of The Dark Tower Omnibus on September 21, 2011 (ISBN 0-7851-5541-4).

On August 28, 2018, Gallery 13 republished the original hardcover collection as Stephen King's The Dark Tower: Beginnings - The Gunslinger Born (Book 1) (ISBN 1-9821-0820-7). On October 23, 2018, this edition (along with Books 2-5) was included in the boxed set Stephen King's The Dark Tower: Beginnings - The Complete Graphic Novel Series (ISBN 1-9821-1020-1).

== See also ==
- The Dark Tower (comics)
- List of comics based on fiction
- Weird West

Followed by
The Dark Tower: The Long Road Home
