= Val Staples =

American comic book colorist

- Born: Val Staples
- Area: Colourist
- Notable works: Masters of the Universe

Val Staples is an American comic book colorist. He wrote for the 2002 Masters of the Universe comic and was one of the founders of its publishing studio, MVCreations. He worked as a freelance colorist for a variety of comic publishers, including MTV, DC, and Marvel.
