= Jae Lee =

American comics artist (born 1972)

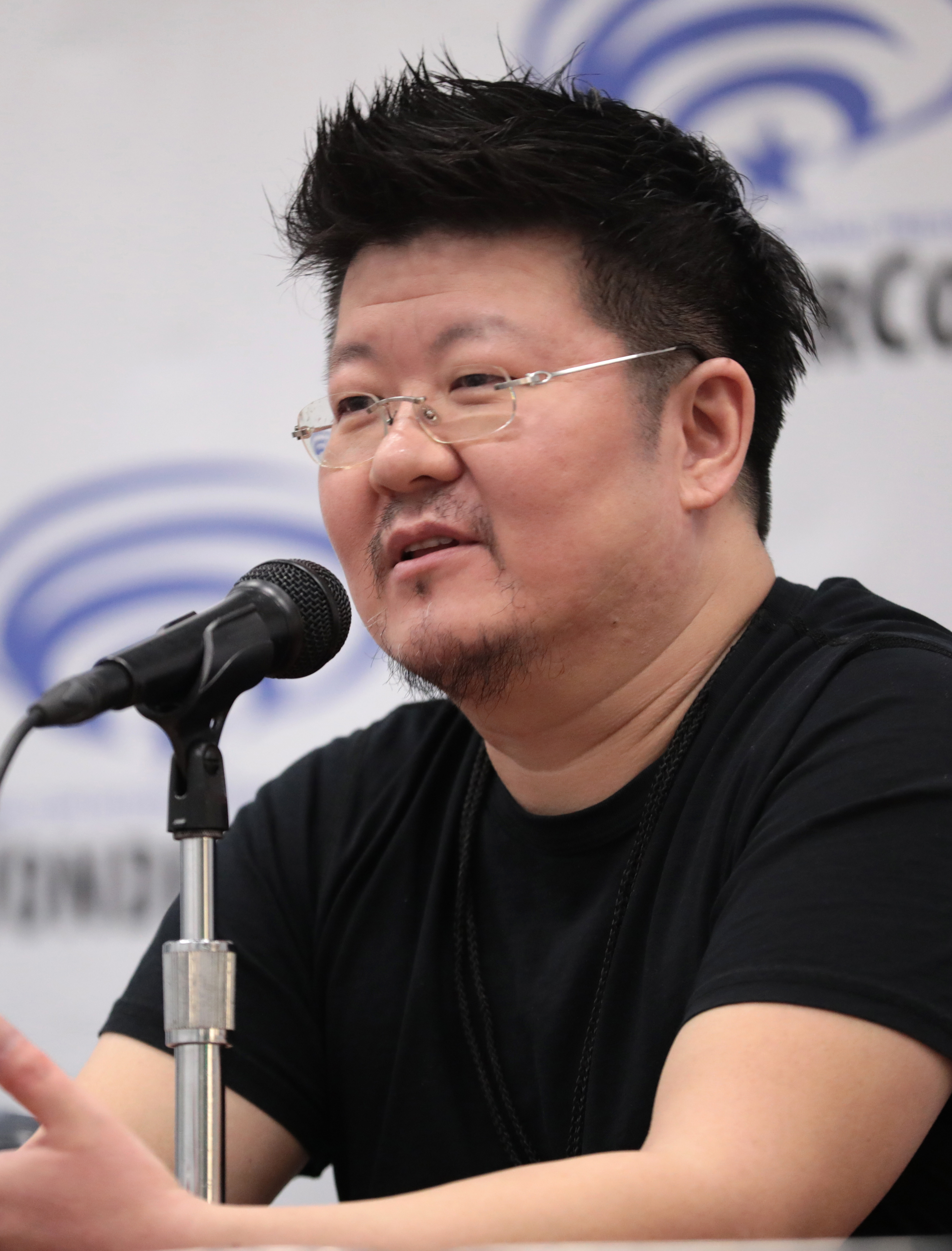
- Lee at the 2023 WonderCon
- Born: 1972 (age 53–54)
- Areas: Penciller, Inker
- Notable works: Before Watchmen: Ozymandias; The Dark Tower; Inhumans; Hellshock; Namor the Sub-Mariner
- Awards: 1999 Eisner Award for Best New Series for Inhumans

Jae Lee (born 1972) is an American comics artist known for his interior illustration and cover work for various publishers, including Marvel Comics, DC Comics, Image Comics, and Dynamite Entertainment.

== Career ==
Jae Lee's first work for Marvel Comics was a Beast serial in Marvel Comics Presents #85–92 (1991). He first rose to prominence in the comics industry in 1992 for his work on Marvel's Namor the Sub-Mariner, taking over the art duties from John Byrne, who continued on the series as writer. Terry Kavanagh, Lee's editor on both Marvel Comics Presents and Namor, later said he assigned Lee to Namor because he liked his style and felt that, as a new artist, he would benefit from working with an experienced writer. Lee continued when Bob Harras became the writer, drawing issues #26–38 (May 1992–May 1993). As penciller of X-Factor, Lee was one of the artists of the "X-Cutioner's Song" storyline which ran throughout the X-Men titles in 1992. The following year, Lee drew the three issue Youngblood Strikefile for Rob Liefeld's Extreme Studios at Image Comics and the three issue WildC.A.T.s Trilogy for Jim Lee's WildStorm, another founding Image Comics studio. In 1994, Jae Lee produced a creator-owned Image Comics series, Hellshock, a story about a fallen angel that he wrote and illustrated. It was his first of several collaborations with colorists José Villarrubia.

In 1998, Lee and writer Paul Jenkins crafted an Inhumans limited series, for which they won the 1999 Eisner Award for Best New Series. They later reteamed on The Sentry. Lee and writer Grant Morrison produced the four-issue miniseries Fantastic Four: 1234 (Oct. 2001–Feb. 2002), which garnered Lee a nomination for a 2002 Eisner Award as Best Cover Artist. In 2003, Lee, writer John Ney Rieber, and Lee's wife, colorist June Chung, produced a Transformers/G.I. Joe six-issue miniseries for Dreamwave Productions, which took place in an alternate World War II setting.

Beginning in 2007, Lee worked with artist Richard Isanove and writers Robin Furth and Peter David on Marvel Comics' The Dark Tower comic series, based on Stephen King's The Dark Tower novels. Lee illustrated the first three miniseries in that series, The Gunslinger Born, The Long Road Home and Treachery. He returned for the fifth book in the series, Battle of Jericho Hill. He also provided cover and interior illustrations for the Donald M. Grant edition of King's eighth Dark Tower novel, The Wind Through the Keyhole, which was released February 21, 2012.

At DC Comics, Lee worked on the Before Watchmen project, drawing the mini-series Ozymandias (Sept. 2012–April 2013) written by Len Wein. He illustrated Batman/Superman in 2013–2014 with writer Greg Pak.

In January 2023 it was reported that Lee would be drawing one of the three Rocketeer stories in IDW Publishing's upcoming one-shot anthology, The Rocketeer. The project was first conceived by filmmakers Kelvin Mao and Robert Windom, who had discovered during production of their documentary, Dave Stevens: Drawn to Perfection, which focused on the creator of the Rocketeer, Dave Stevens, that Danny Bilson and the late Paul De Meo, who wrote the screenplay to the 1991 feature film adaptation The Rocketeer, had written an unpublished Rocketeer comics story. After hiring Adam Hughes to illustrate that story, Lee was hired to draw one of the other stories in the book, a four-page story of the Rocketeer fighting a Japanese Zero fighter plane in the South Pacific, written by Windom, who described it as "dreamy contemplation on life and love."

In 2025, Lee sold his character Hellshock to Dynamite Entertainment, who own the publishing and media rights to the title and characters.

Cover art from Manhunter vol. 3, #4 (Jan. 2005).

== Awards and nominations ==
- 1999 Eisner Award for Best New Series, for Inhumans vol. 2, with Paul Jenkins
- Nominated: 2002 Eisner Award for Best Cover Artist, for Our Worlds at War and Fantastic Four: 1234

== Bibliography ==
=== Comics ===
==== DC Comics ====
- Action Comics vol. 2 #38 (among other artists) (2015)
- Batman: Jekyll & Hyde miniseries, #1–3 (of 6) (2005)
- Batman/Superman #1–4, 8–9, 13, Annual #1 (2013–2014)
- Before Watchmen: Ozymandias miniseries, #1–6 (2012–2013)
- Fables #146 (among other artists) (2015)
- Superman: American Alien #4 (2016)

==== Image Comics ====
- The Darkness: Prelude (2003)
- The Darkness and Tomb Raider (2005)
- Hellshock #1–4 (1994)
- Hellshock, vol. 2, #1–3 (1997–1998)
- Hellshock, vol. 2, The Definitive Edition (2007)
- Seven Sons (2022)
- This Ends Tonight, miniseries (2025)
- WildC.A.T.s: Trilogy, miniseries, #1–3 (1993)
- Witchblade: Demon (2003)
- Witchblade and Tomb Raider (2005)
- Youngblood: Strikefile, miniseries, #1–3 (1993)

==== Marvel Comics ====
- Captain America vol. 4 #10–16 (2003)
- Daredevil vol. 2 #65 (among other artists) (2004)
- Dark Tower:
  - The Gunslinger Born miniseries #1–7 (2007)
  - The Long Road Home miniseries #1–5 (2008)
  - Treachery miniseries #1–6 (2008–2009)
  - The Battle of Jericho Hill miniseries #1–5 (2010)
- Excalibur vs. X-Men: XX Crossing Special (among other artists) (1992)
- Fantastic Four: 1234 #1–4 (2001–2002)
- Hulk & Thing: Hard Knocks miniseries #1–4 (2004–2005)
- The Incredible Hulk vol. 3 #82 (2005)
- Inhumans vol. 2 #1–12 (1998–1999)
- Marvel Comics Presents #85–92 (Beast feature) (among other artists) (1991)
- Namor the Sub-Mariner #26–38 (1992–1993)
- The Sentry miniseries #1–5 (2000–2001)
- Sentry vs. The Void (2001)
- Spider-Man #41–43 (1993–1994)
- Ultimate Fantastic Four #19–20 (2005)
- Ultimate Fantastic Four Annual #1 (2005)
- Uncanny X-Men #304 (among other artists) (1993)
- Uncanny X-Men Annual #16 (1992)
- X-Factor #84–86 (1992–1993)
- Young Avengers Special #1 (among other artists) (2006)

==== Other publishers ====
- Transformers / G.I. Joe #1–6 (Dreamwave, 2003)
- Verotika #3 (Verotik, 1995)

=== Books ===
- The Illustrated Dracula by Bram Stoker (Viking Studio, 2006)
- The Dark Tower: The Wind Through the Keyhole by Stephen King - Limited Edition (Donald M. Grant, Publisher, 2012)

=== Film ===
Jae Lee provided the artwork for the portrait of Death in the 2019 animated short DC Showcase: Death, as well as several sketch drawings seen during the end credits.

Preceded by John Byrne	Namor the Sub-Mariner artist 1992–1993	Succeeded by Jimmy Palmiotti
Preceded by Mark Pacella	X-Factor artist 1992–1993	Succeeded by Joe Quesada
Preceded by Klaus Janson	Spider-Man artist 1993–1994	Succeeded by Tom Lyle
