= Richard Isanove =

- Born: 1968 (age 57–58)
- Areas: Penciller, Colorist
- Notable works: The Dark Tower: The Gunslinger Born

Richard Isanove (born 1968) is a French/American artist and painter working mostly in the comic books industry.

== Early life ==
Richard Isanove was born in the south of France, studied film and animation at the Ecole nationale superieure des arts decoratifs in Paris, and moved to the United States in 1994 to study animation at the California Institute of the Arts.

== Career ==
While in school, he was hired by Brian Haberlin as a staff colorist for Top Cow where, one year later, he became Art Director.

He went on to free-lance for multiple comics companies before settling at Marvel Comics. His distinctive coloring on the Wolverine: Origin series marked a new direction in coloring in the comics medium. It was soon followed by Marvel 1602 and in 2007 Stephen King's The Dark Tower: The Gunslinger Born. He now alternates color work and fully painted work for Marvel, DC Comics and Amazing Comics.

== Awards ==
Isanove won the Wizard Fan Award in 2001 for his work on Wolverine: Origin and a Quill Award in 2005 for Marvel 1602.

== Bibliography ==
=== Writer ===
- Savage Wolverine: Wrath

=== Pencils/layout interior ===
- X-Men Unlimited vol. 1 #48
- The Dark Tower: The Gunslinger Born #4-7 Backstory illustrations
- The Dark Tower: The Long Road Home Backstory illustrations
- The Dark Tower: Treachery #1-4, 6 Backstory illustrations
- American Eagle #1
- The Dark Tower: The Fall of Gilead
- The Dark Tower: Last Shots
- Savage Wolverine: Wrath
- Edge of Spider-Verse #1: Spider-Man Noir
- DC Secret Origins: Constantine
- Secret Wars Journal #3: Wolverine Noir
- American Vampire: The Bleeding Nun
- League of Legends: Ryze

=== Pencils/layout covers ===
- Army of Darkness: Ashes 2 Ashes
- Army of Darkness: Shop till You Drop Dead
- Red Sonja
- Savage Tales of Red Sonja #1-2
- The Dark Tower: Treachery #4 Alternative Cover
- The Stand: Captain Trips #4 Alternative Cover
- The Man with No Name #1-10
- Terminator #1-3
- Savage Wolverine: Wrath

=== Colors interior ===
- The 100 Greatest Marvels of All Time #4
- Ant-Man Big Christmas
- Arcanum
- Black Panther vol. 4 #15
- Captain America: Red, White and Blue
- Conan the Barbarian (Dark Horse) Red Nails #1
- Conan the Barbarian (Dark Horse) Rogues in the House
- Cyberforce #25-32
- Cyblade/Ghost Rider #1
- Daredevil vol. 2 #5-11, 13-17
- Daredevil: Father #1-5
- Fantastic Firsts #1
- Ghost Rider/Ballistic #1
- Heroes
- Magneto Rex
- Marvel 1602
- New Avengers Annual #1
- Savage Wolverine: Wrath
- The Sentry vol. 2 #8
- Silver Surfer/Weapon Zero #1
- Spider-Man: One More Day
- The Dark Tower: The Gunslinger Born
- The Dark Tower: The Long Road Home
- The Dark Tower: Treachery
- The Dark Tower: The Fall of Gilead
- The Dark Tower: Battle of Jericho Hill
- The Dark Tower: The Journey Begins
- The Dark Tower: The Little Sisters of Eluria
- The Dark Tower: The Battle of Tull
- The Dark Tower: The Way Station
- The Dark Tower: The Man in Black
- The Dark Tower: Last Shots
- Ultimate Iron Man #1-5
- Ultimate Six #1
- Ultimate Spider-Man #92-93
- Ultimate X-Men #1-2, 4-7, 12
- Uncanny X-Men #381, 383-384, 386-388
- Weapon Zero/Silver Surfer #1
- Wolverine/Hulk #1-4
- Wolverine: Origin
- X-Men vol. 2 #82-84
- X-Men/Star Trek #1
- X-Men Unlimited vol. 1 #48

=== Colors covers ===
- The Amazing Spider-Man #515, 517
- Ant-Man Big Christmas #1
- Art of Marvel vol. 2 HC
- Astonishing X-Men vol. 3 #1
- Before the Fantastic Four: The Storms #3
- Best of the Fantastic Four vol. 1 HC
- Bishop, the Last X-Man #1-2
- Blink #1, 4
- The Call of Duty: The Brotherhood #5-6
- Captain America vol. 3 #32
- Daredevil vol. 2 #6-8
- Deathlok vol. 3 #1
- Doctor Spectrum #1-3
- Fantastic Four vol. 3 #60-70
- Fantastic Four vol. 1 #501-502, 509-513, 523
- Fantastic Four: House of M #1
- Iron Man vol. 3 #26-27, 29, 32
- New Avengers #3, 5-6
- New X-Men vol. 2 #1
- The Dark Tower: The Gunslinger Born
- The Dark Tower: The Long Road Home
- The Dark Tower: Treachery
- The Official Handbook of the Marvel Universe: Avengers 2004
- The Official Handbook of the Marvel Universe: Hulk 2004
- The Official Handbook of the Marvel Universe: Spider-Man 2004
- The Official Handbook of the Marvel Universe: X-Men 2004
- Silver Surfer/Witchblade #½, 1
- Spider-Man: Get Kraven #1-2, 4-6
- Supreme Power #1-15, 18
- Supreme Power Special Edition #1
- Thor vol. 2 #29, 32-35
- Ultimate Iron Man #1-5
- Ultimate Spider-Man #58-133
- Ultimate Spider-Man Annual #1
- Ultimate X-Men #3, 5, 7-8, 11-14, 16-21, 23-25, 27, 29-34, 36-43, 58-62, 65, 67
- Uncanny X-Men #383, 386, 388, 460-461
- Warlock vol. 4 #1
- Weapon Zero/Silver Surfer #1
- Wolverine vol. 3 #24-28, 30-31, 33, 36
- Wolverine: The End #1
- Wolverine: Origin #1-6
- Wolverine: Origins #1-5
- Wolverine: Weapon X #1
- X-51: Machine Man #1
- X-Men vol. 2 #83

== Frequent collaborators ==
- Joe Quesada
- Jae Lee
- Adam Kubert
- Andy Kubert
- Brandon Peterson
- Mark Bagley
- Stuart Immonen
