= Robin Furth =

American writer and research assistant

- Born: June 11, 1965 (age 61); U.S.
- Occupation: Writer
- Website: www.robinfurth.com

Robin Furth is the personal research assistant to Stephen King and the author of Stephen King's The Dark Tower: A Complete Concordance, which was published by Scribner on December 5, 2006. It is a compilation of her two previous encyclopedic books dealing with King's magnum opus, The Dark Tower: A Concordance, volume I - which explores the first four books in King's series - and A Concordance II, which gives the reader definitions and explanations of pivotal terms used over the course of the final three books of The Dark Tower. She is now currently working on the graphic novel adaptation of the Dark Tower for Marvel Comics .

== Life and work ==
Raised in Upper Darby and along the coast of Maine, Furth has worked as King's assistant for over five years. She is credited as having illustrated the maps that appear in the novel The Dark Tower. Furth plotted the comic book spin-off miniseries The Dark Tower: The Gunslinger Born, which serves as a counterpart to the series of novels written by Stephen King. She is also credited as a writer for Legion of Monsters: Satana #1 and as an editor and creative consultant for the Dark Tower: Gunslinger's Guidebook, both published by Marvel Publishing, Inc. In October 2009, Del Rey Comics published The Talisman #0, with Furth credited as writer. This comic book series is an adaptation of the Stephen King/Peter Straub novel of the same name. She's also credited with writing The Dark Tower: The Gunslinger: The Journey Begins in 2011. “Stephen King's The Bill Hodges Concordance“ was released in August 2017.

== See also ==
- Bev Vincent
