= The Gunslinger and the Dark Man =

Short story by Stephen King

- Short story by Stephen King
- Country: United States
- Language: English
- Genre: Fantasy

Publication
- Published in: The Magazine of Fantasy and Science Fiction
- Publisher: Mercury Press
- Media type: Print (Magazine)
- Publication date: November 1981

Chronology
- Series: The Dark Tower
The Slow Mutants	The Drawing of the Three

"The Gunslinger and the Dark Man" is a fantasy short story by American writer Stephen King, originally published in The Magazine of Fantasy and Science Fiction in November 1981. In 1982, "The Gunslinger and the Dark Man" was collected with several other stories King published in The Magazine of Fantasy and Science Fiction as The Dark Tower: The Gunslinger. "The Gunslinger and the Dark Man" formed the fifth and final chapter of the book, and was slightly revised for the inclusion. For the Revised and expanded edition published in 2003, "The Gunslinger and the Dark Man" was retitled to "The Gunslinger and the Man in Black."

== Plot ==
After sacrificing Jake in the mountain, Roland makes his way down to speak to the man in black. The man reads Roland's fate from a pack of Tarot cards, including "the sailor" (Jake), "the prisoner" (Eddie Dean) "the lady of shadows" (Susannah Dean), "death" (but not for Roland), and the Tower itself, as the center of everything. The man in black states that he is merely a pawn of Roland's true enemy, the one who now controls the Dark Tower itself.

Roland attacks the man in black, who retaliates by knocking him out with an incantation. Roland enters a terrifying visionary hallucination revealing the nature of the cosmos. Upon awakening, he questions the man in black further and recognizes him as Marten Broadcloak, the court sorcerer who had manipulated Roland into undergoing an early trial to earn his status as a gunslinger. Roland had left his home for a time after passing the trial, but found on his return that Marten had joined a rebellion against the realm.

The man in black puts Roland to sleep for ten years; when Roland awakes, he finds that nothing is left of the man except for his skeleton. He takes its jawbone with him as he departs, as a replacement for the one he had given to Jake in "The Oracle and the Mountains," and travels by foot to the Western Sea.

== See also ==
- Short fiction by Stephen King
