= The Dark Tower VI: Song of Susannah =

2004 novel by Stephen King

- First edition cover
- Author: Stephen King
- Cover artist: Darrel Anderson
- Language: English
- Series: The Dark Tower
- Genre: Fantasy, horror, science fiction, western
- Publisher: Grant
- Publication date: June 8, 2004
- Publication place: United States
- Media type: Print (hardcover)
- Pages: 432
- ISBN: 978-1-880-41859-8
- Preceded by: Wolves of the Calla
- Followed by: The Dark Tower

The Dark Tower VI: Song of Susannah: Reproduction, or simply The Song of Susannah, is a 2004 fantasy novel by American writer Stephen King. It is the sixth book in his Dark Tower series.

== Plot summary ==
Susannah Dean is partially trapped in her own mind by Mia, the former demon and now heavily pregnant mortal woman who took control of her body shortly after the battle against the Wolves of Calla Bryn Sturgis. (Note: As depicted in Wolves of the Calla.) Susannah-Mia, with their shared body mostly under the control of Mia, escapes via the magic door in Doorway Cave with the help of Black Thirteen. Mia tells Susannah she has made a Faustian deal with Richard Sayre to surrender her demonic immortality in exchange for being able to produce a child. Technically speaking, however, this child is the biological descendant of Susannah Dean and the gunslinger, Roland. The Gunslinger's seed was passed to Susannah through an 'elemental' - in this case an incubus/succubus, who had sex with both. The technical parentage of her child matters little to Mia, though, because The Crimson King has further promised her that she will have sole charge of raising the child, Mordred, for the first part of his life - the time before the critical destiny the Crimson King foresees for the child comes to pass. All Mia must do now is to bring Susannah to the Dixie Pig restaurant to give birth to the child under the care of the Crimson King's men.

The rest of the ka-tet employs the help of the Manni to open the magic door inside Doorway Cave. They are split up by the magic door, or perhaps ka, and sent to two different time/place destinations.

Jake, Oy, and Father Callahan follow Susannah-Mia to New York City in 1999 in order to save Susannah from the danger Mia has put her in by delivering her into the custody of the Crimson King's henchmen. Jake and Callahan also recover Black Thirteen and place it in a storage locker beneath the World Trade Center. Without them knowing, Black Thirteen will be destroyed or forever buried when the towers collapse in the September 11, 2001 attacks.

Roland and Eddie Dean are sent by the magic doorway to Maine in 1977, with the goal of securing the ownership of a vacant lot in New York from its current owner, Calvin Tower. (Note: Who first appears in The Waste Lands as the proprietor of The Manhattan Restaurant of the Mind, where he sells Jake a copy of Charlie the Choo-Choo.) The gunslingers have seen and felt the power of a rose that is located in the vacant lot and suspect it to be some sort of secondary hub to the universe, or even a representation of the Dark Tower itself. The ka-tet believe that the Tower is linked to the rose and will be harmed (or fall) if the rose is harmed. Calvin Tower is in hiding in Maine from Enrico Balazar's men, (Note: See The Drawing of the Three.) who have almost succeeded in strong-arming him into selling them the lot. Tower has so far resisted, with the help of Eddie Dean. (Note: See Wolves of the Calla.) Upon their arrival in Maine, the gunslingers find themselves thrown into an ambush by these same men, headed by Jack Andolini. Balazar's men were tipped off on Roland and Eddie's potential whereabouts by Mia, who hoped that they would dispose of the people she perceived as threats to her child. Roland and Eddie escape this onslaught with the help of a local, John Cullum, who they deem to be a savior put in their path through the machinations of ka.

After accomplishing their primary goal, the deeding of the vacant lot to the Tet Corporation, Roland and Eddie learn of the nearby location of Stephen King's home. They are familiar with the author's name after coming into possession of a copy of his novel 'Salem's Lot in the Calla, and decide to pay him a visit. King's presence, and his relationship to the Dark Tower, cause the reality surrounding his Maine town to become "thin." Strange creatures called "walk-ins" begin emerging and plaguing the community. The author is unaware of this and has never seen one, though most of the walk-ins have been appearing on his own street. The Gunslinger hypnotizes King and finds out that King is not a god, but rather a medium for the story of the Dark Tower to transmit itself through. Roland also implants in King the suggestion to restart his efforts in writing the Dark Tower series, which he has abandoned of late, claiming that there are major forces involved that are trying to prevent him from finishing it. The ka-tet are convinced that the success of their quest itself depends somehow on King's writing about it through the story.

In New York, Jake and Father Callahan prepare to launch an assault on the Dixie Pig, where Susannah-Mia is being held by the soldiers of The Crimson King. Their discovery of the scrimshaw turtle that Susannah has left behind for them gives them a faint hope that they might succeed. Jake and Callahan enter with weapons raised, while Susannah-Mia is giving birth in Fedic, a town in Thunderclap. Segments of Stephen King's diary, which encompass the period from 1977 to 1999, are shown. The diary details King's writing of the first four books of the Dark Tower story. This process stops when Stephen King dies on June 19, 1999.

== Reception ==
The novel was nominated for the Locus Award for Best Fantasy Novel in 2005.
