= The Way Station =

Short story by Stephen King

- Author: Stephen King
- Language: English
- Series: The Dark Tower
- Genre: Fantasy
- Published in: The Magazine of Fantasy and Science Fiction
- Publisher: Mercury Press
- Publication date: April 1980
- Publication place: United States
- Media type: Print (Magazine)
- Preceded by: The Gunslinger
- Followed by: The Oracle and the Mountains

The Way Station is a novella by American writer Stephen King, originally published in The Magazine of Fantasy and Science Fiction in April 1980. In 1982, "The Way Station" was collected with several other stories King published in The Magazine of Fantasy and Science Fiction as The Dark Tower: The Gunslinger. "The Way Station" formed the second chapter of the book, and was slightly revised for the inclusion.

== Plot summary ==
At a way station in the desert, Roland Deschain meets Jake Chambers for the first time. Under hypnosis, Jake remembers that he has recently been killed in his own world, the New York City of 1977, when someone pushed him into traffic. This event creates the series' first link of Roland's world to others, and Jake's account leads Roland to believe that the man in black may have caused the death.

While searching the way station's cellar for usable supplies, Roland encounters a demon that speaks to him through a skeleton buried behind the wall. The demon warns him that the man in black will be able to use Jake as an asset against him as long as the two are traveling together. On impulse, Roland takes the skeleton's jawbone with him.

Roland and Jake set off into the desert, heading toward a mountain range where the man in black has gone. Along the way, Roland tells Jake about a training session under the severe regimen of his teacher Cort, who showed him how to use a hawk as a weapon; and how Roland and one of his best friends, Cuthbert Allgood, exposed the cook Hax as a traitor working for the Good Man and sent him to the gallows.

Among other changes made by King for the 2003 revised version of The Gunslinger, King altered the "Rain in Spain" nursery rhyme included in the opening pages.

== See also ==
- Short fiction by Stephen King
