= The Dark Tower VII: The Dark Tower =

2004 novel by Stephen King

- First edition cover
- Author: Stephen King
- Cover artist: Michael Whelan
- Language: English
- Series: The Dark Tower
- Genre: Fantasy, horror, science fiction, western
- Publisher: Grant
- Publication date: September 21, 2004
- Publication place: United States
- Media type: Print (hardcover)
- Pages: 845
- ISBN: 978-1-880418-62-8
- Preceded by: Song of Susannah

The Dark Tower VII: The Dark Tower is a 2004 fantasy novel by American writer Stephen King. It is the seventh and final book in his Dark Tower series. It was published by Grant on September 21, 2004 (King's birthday), and illustrated by Michael Whelan. It has four subtitles: "Reproduction", "Revelation", "Redemption", and "Resumption" – all but the second of these having been used as subtitles for previous novels in the series.

== Plot summary ==
Jake Chambers and Father Callahan battle "Low-Men" and Type One Vampires within the Dixie Pig, a lounge in New York City featuring roast human flesh and doors to other worlds. (Note: This story begins where book six left off.) Callahan eventually sacrifices himself to let Jake survive.

In the village of Fedic within Roland's world, Mia, her body now physically separated from Susannah Dean, gives birth to Mordred Deschain, the biological son of Roland and Susannah. The Crimson King is also a "co-father" of this prophetic child. "Baby" Mordred shapeshifts into a spider-creature and feasts on his birth-mother. Susannah shoots but fails to kill Mordred, eliminates other agents of the King, and escapes to meet up with Jake at the cross-dimensional door beneath the Dixie Pig which connects to Fedic. Maturing at an accelerated rate, Mordred later stalks the ka-tet, shifting from human to spider as the need arises, seething with an instinctive rage toward Roland, his "white daddy."

In Maine, Roland and Eddie recruit John Cullum, and then return to Fedic, where the ka-tet is reunited. Walter O'Dim (Note: Known in other stories as Randall Flagg.) plans to slay Mordred and use the birthmark on Mordred's heel to gain access to the Tower, but he is easily slain and eaten by the infant when Mordred sees through his lies.

The ka-tet travels to Thunderclap, then to the nearby Devar-Toi, to help a group of psychics known as Breakers who are allowing their telepathic abilities to be used to break away at the beams that support the Tower. Ted Brautigan and Dinky Earnshaw assist the gunslingers with information and weapons, and reunite Roland with his old friend Sheemie Ruiz from Mejis. The Gunslingers free the Breakers from their captors, but Eddie is wounded after the battle and soon dies. Roland and Jake pause to mourn and then jump to Maine of 1999 along with Oy to save the life of Stephen King (who is a character in the book); the ka-tet have come to believe that the success of their quest depends on King surviving to write about it through his books.

They discover King about to be hit by a van. Jake pushes King out of the way, getting killed in the process. Roland, heartbroken with the loss of his adoptive son, buries Jake and returns with Oy to Susannah in Fedic, via the Dixie Pig, after paying a visit to the Tet Corporation. They are chased through the depths of Castle Discordia by an otherworldly monster, then depart and travel for weeks across freezing badlands toward the Tower.

En route, they find Patrick Danville, a young man imprisoned by someone who calls himself Joe Collins but is really a psychic vampire named Dandelo. Dandelo feeds off the emotions of his victims, and starts to feed off of Roland and Susannah by telling them jokes. Roland and Susannah are alerted to the danger by Stephen King, who drops clues directly into the book, enabling them to defeat Dandelo. They discover Patrick in the basement, and find that Dandelo had removed his tongue. Patrick is freed and soon his special talent becomes evident: his drawings and paintings become reality. As their travels bring them nearer to the Tower, Susannah comes to the conclusion that Roland needs to complete his journey without her. Susannah asks Patrick to draw a door she has seen in her dreams to lead her out of this world. He does so and once it appears, Susannah says goodbye to Roland and crosses over to another world, taking one of his guns with her.

Mordred, now dying due to food poisoning, finally reaches and attacks Roland while he sleeps. Oy viciously defends his dinh, providing Roland the extra seconds needed to kill Mordred. Oy is impaled on a tree branch and dies. Roland eventually reaches the Tower, only to find it occupied by the Crimson King. They remain in a stalemate for hours, until Roland has Patrick draw a picture of the King and then erase it, thus wiping him out of existence except for his eyes. Roland gains entry into the Tower while Patrick turns back home. Before entering the Tower, Roland cries out the names of his loved ones and fallen comrades as he had vowed to do.

Meanwhile, Susannah comes through the door to an alternate 1980s New York, where Gary Hart is president. Finding that Roland's gun is now rusty and useless, she throws it away in a rejection of her past as a gunslinger, and starts a new life with alternate versions of Eddie and Jake, who in this world are brothers with the surname Toren. They have only vague memories of their previous journey with Susannah, whose own memories of Mid-World are already beginning to fade. It is implied that an alternate version of Oy, the billy-bumbler, will also join them.

Inside the Dark Tower, Roland realizes that the Tower is not really made of stone, but a kind of flesh: it is Gan's physical body. As he climbs the steps, Roland encounters rooms containing siguls or signs of his past life. When he reaches the top of the Tower, he finds a door marked with his own name and opens it. Roland instantly realizes, to his horror, that he has reached the Tower countless times before, and is trapped in Ka's wheel for his "sins" (the exact reasons are left unknown). He is forced through the door by the hands of Gan and transported back in time to the Mohaine desert, back to where he was earlier in his journey (Note: At the beginning of The Dark Tower: The Gunslinger.) with no memories of what has just occurred. The only difference is that, this time, Roland possesses the Horn of Eld, which in the previous incarnation he had left lying on the ground after the Battle of Jericho Hill. Roland hears the voice of Gan, whispering that, if he reaches the Tower again, perhaps this time the result will be different; there may yet be rest and redemption, if he stands true.

The book ends with the same sentence that began the first one: "The man in black fled across the desert, and the gunslinger followed."

== Reception ==
The novel won the British Fantasy Award in 2005.

== Film sequel ==
On May 18, 2016, Stephen King tweeted a photo of the Horn of Eld with the caption 'Last Time Around', referring to the end of the final book and revealing that the upcoming 2017 film was a sequel to the book series rather than a direct adaptation. In the beginning of the film, Roland has the Horn of Eld, which he received at the end of The Dark Tower VII: The Dark Tower.
