= Eddie Dean =

Eddie Dean may refer to:

- Eddie Dean (singer) (1907–1999), American western singer and actor
- Eddie Dean (The Dark Tower), a fictional character in Stephen King's The Dark Tower series of novels
