= The Dark Tower V: Wolves of the Calla =

2003 fantasy novel by Stephen King

- First edition cover
- Author: Stephen King
- Cover artist: Bernie Wrightson
- Language: English
- Series: The Dark Tower
- Genre: Fantasy, horror, Science fiction, western
- Publisher: Grant
- Publication date: October 2003
- Publication place: United States
- Media type: Print (hardcover)
- Pages: 714
- ISBN: 978-1-880418-56-7
- Preceded by: The Wind Through the Keyhole
- Followed by: Song of Susannah

The Dark Tower V: Wolves of the Calla is a dark fantasy novel by American writer Stephen King. It is the fifth book in his The Dark Tower series. The book continues the story of Roland Deschain, Eddie Dean, Susannah Dean, Jake Chambers, and Oy as they make their way toward the Dark Tower. The subtitle of this novel is Resistance. Prior to the novel's publication, two excerpts were published: "Calla Bryn Sturgis" was published in 2001 on Stephen King's official site, and "The Tale of Gray Dick" was published in 2003 in McSweeney's Mammoth Treasury of Thrilling Tales. Both excerpts were incorporated in revised form into the full version of the 2003 novel. Wolves of the Calla was nominated for the Locus Award for Best Fantasy Novel in 2004.

== Plot summary ==
After escaping the alternate Topeka and the wizard Walter O'Dim and weathering the starkblast, Roland's ka-tet continue their travels. During this time, Eddie Dean and Jake Chambers are sent to New York, 1977, via a dream-state called todash. There, they encounter Calvin Tower, a bookstore owner who had previously given Jake a book that proved integral to the quest for the Dark Tower. (Note: As depicted in The Waste Lands.) Tower owns the vacant lot that houses a rose that is the physical manifestation of the Dark Tower. Crime boss Enrico Balazar (Note: Who previously appeared in The Drawing of the Three.) is attempting to coerce him into selling the lot to the mysterious Sombra Corporation. If this happens, the rose (and the Dark Tower) will be destroyed.

Soon after, the ka-tet discover that they are being followed by citizens of the farming village of Calla Bryn Sturgis, as well as Father Callahan. He and the townsfolk request the ka-tet's assistance in battling against the Wolves of Thunderclap, who come once a generation to take one child from each pair of the town's twins. (For some reason, nearly all children in the town are born as twins.) After a few months of being away, the children are then returned "roont" (ruined) – mentally handicapped and destined to grow to enormous size and die young. The Wolves are due to come in about a month's time, according to Andy, an amicable humanoid robot that appeared in the Calla long ago. When asked about the Wolves, Andy refuses to divulge any information without a password. Jamie Jaffords, an elderly resident of the Calla, remembers the previous time the Wolves appeared and tells of how he and his friends confronted them decades earlier and killed one.

Father Callahan also tells the gunslingers the story of how he left Maine following his battle with the vampire Kurt Barlow. (Note: The plot of the novel 'Salem's Lot.) Since that encounter he has gained the ability to identify Type-3 vampires. He begins killing these minor vampires as he finds them; however, this makes him a wanted man amongst the "low men". Forced to go into exile, Callahan eventually is lured into a trap and dies, allowing him to enter Mid-World in 1983, much as Jake did when previously killed. (Note: As depicted in The Gunslinger.) He appears at the Way Station, shortly after Roland and Jake meet for the first time, and meets Walter O'Dim, who gives him Black Thirteen, a magic ball. Walter transports Callahan to the mountains near Calla Bryn Sturgis, where the Manni people find him in a place called the Doorway Cave. Roland deduces that Black Thirteen induced the todash dreams that sent Eddie and Jake to New York and that it can allow them to travel between worlds. The ka-tet decides to use it to travel back to New York in 1977 and ensure that the rose is protected.

Eddie and Roland venture to Doorway Cave. Using Black Thirteen, Roland opens a door for Eddie to travel to New York. Once there he fends off Balazar's thugs, threatening to kill them if they come back for Tower. He then tells Tower that Balazar will come back for him, and that he should flee and leave a message for the ka-tet so that they may find him again. Tower agrees to do so but, in exchange, he asks that he can hide his valuable books in Roland's world for safekeeping, where they are hidden in Doorway Cave. Callahan later travels to New York in order to determine Tower's new location.

While planning the battle with the Wolves, Roland and Jake notice bizarre changes in Susannah's behavior, which are linked to the time when she coupled with the demon in the stone circle. Susannah turns out to have been hiding the fact that she was impregnated by the demon. Susannah later reveals to the ka-tet that she herself has come to grips with it, and knowledge of a second personality living in her named Mia "daughter of none" is shared.

Andy turns out to be an emissary for the Wolves. The father of Jake's new friend Benny Slightman has betrayed the Calla by feeding Andy information in exchange for sparing Benny from going to Thunderclap. Jake follows the two conspirators to "The Dogan", a military outpost between the Calla and Thunderclap. (Note: Which is also featured in The Dark Tower: The Long Road Home.) There, he discovers a surveillance system that monitors the entire Calla, and overhears Andy and Slightman communicating with someone named Finli o'Tego. Jake tells Roland, who shows mercy by not killing Slightman, instead leaving him alive for his son and Jake's sake. Eddie also blinds Andy and decommissions him for his part in the Wolves' attack.

On the day of the Wolves' arrival, Roland reveals what he has gleaned from their investigation to his attack team: the Wolves are not men, but robots, much like Andy himself. The Wolves attack, using weapons resembling snitches and lightsabers, and have Doctor Doom-like visages. The gunslingers hide the children in a rice patch and lay a false trail to lure the Wolves in, then ambush them with the help of plate-throwing women in the Calla. All of the Wolves are killed, while the defenders suffer only two deaths – a thrower and Benny, the latter of which greatly dismays Jake.

After the battle, Mia takes control of Susannah's body and flees to Doorway Cave, where she uses Black Thirteen to transport herself to New York. Roland, Jake, Eddie, and Callahan follow her there but are too late; Mia and Black Thirteen are gone, and the door in the cave is closed. While looking through Tower's books in the cave, Callahan makes a discovery that causes him to question his own existence: a fictional novel called 'Salem's Lot, written by someone named Stephen King, that seems to recount his encounters with Barlow and the vampires.

== Influences ==
Stephen King has acknowledged multiple sources of influence for this story, including Akira Kurosawa's Seven Samurai, its remake The Magnificent Seven, Sergio Leone's "Man with No Name" trilogy, and other works by Howard Hawks and John Sturges, among others.

Many direct references to popular culture are noted either by characters or via narration within the book's text. Such instances include: several of the Wolves carrying weapons that resemble lightsabers and a "messenger robot" similar in demeanor to the android C-3PO from the Star Wars movies, with the look of an Isaac Asimov robot; the Wolves themselves seeming to bear a physical resemblance to Doctor Doom from the Marvel Comics comic books, and flying grenades named "sneetches" that are stated as being from the Harry Potter product line (a direct reference to the Golden Snitch from the J. K. Rowling books, and to the Dr. Seuss characters). Also, in minor reference to the Harry Potter series, King makes use of the same font (for chapter titles) used in all seven Harry Potter books.

King also references an earlier, uncollected short story from the late 1980s called "The Reploids", which deals with people sliding between realities and also features denominations of money featuring President Chadbourne.
