= The Dark Tower III: The Waste Lands =

1991 fantasy novel by American writer Stephen King

- First edition cover
- Author: Stephen King
- Audio read by: Frank Muller
- Cover artist: Ned Dameron
- Language: English
- Series: The Dark Tower
- Genre: Dark fantasy, science fiction
- Publisher: Grant
- Publication date: September 3, 1991
- Publication place: United States
- Media type: Print (Hardcover)
- Pages: 512
- ISBN: 978-0-937986-17-2
- Preceded by: The Drawing of the Three
- Followed by: Wizard and Glass

The Dark Tower III: The Waste Lands: Redemption, commonly known simply as The Waste Lands, is a dark fantasy novel by American writer Stephen King. It is the third book of the Dark Tower series. The original limited edition hardcover featuring full-color illustrations by Ned Dameron was published in 1991 by Grant. The book was reissued in 2003 to coincide with the publication of The Dark Tower V: Wolves of the Calla. The book derives its title from the T. S. Eliot 1922 poem The Waste Land, several lines of which are reprinted in the opening pages. In addition, the two main sections of the book ("Jake: Fear in a Handful of Dust" and "Lud: A Heap of Broken Images") are named after lines in the poem. The Waste Lands was nominated for the 1991 Bram Stoker Award for Novel.

== Plot ==
Roland, Susannah, and Eddie have moved east from the shore of the Western Sea, and into the woods of Out-World. (Note: This story takes place five weeks after the events of the previous book.) After an encounter with Shardik, a gigantic cyborg bear, they discover one of the six mystical Beams that hold the world together. The three gunslingers follow the Path of the Beam inland to Mid-World.

Roland now reveals to his ka-tet (group of people bound together by fate/destiny) that his mind has become divided and he is slowly losing his sanity. Roland remembers meeting Jake Chambers in the way station and letting him fall to his death in the mountains. (Note: As depicted in The Dark Tower: The Gunslinger.) However, he also remembers passing through the desert alone and never meeting Jake. When Roland saved Jake from being killed by Jack Mort in 1977, (Note: As depicted in The Dark Tower II: The Drawing of the Three.) he inadvertently created a paradox; Jake did not die and thus did not appear in Mid-World and travel with Roland.

In 1977 New York, Jake Chambers is experiencing exactly the same mental divide, which is causing alarm at his private school, and angering Jake's cocaine-abusing father. Roland burns Walter's jawbone and the solution to his dilemma is revealed, but to Eddie instead of Roland. Eddie must carve a key that will open the door to New York in 1977.

Jake abruptly leaves school and finds a key in a littered vacant lot where a single red rose has bloomed. Jake manages to pass into Roland's world using the key to open a door in an abandoned haunted house on Dutch Hill in his place and time. This portal ends in a 'speaking ring' in Roland's world. During this crossing over, Susannah traps an incubus with her mind as it rapes her, distracting it while Eddie continues to carve the key which will allow Jake safe passage to Mid-World. Once the group is reunited, Jake and Roland's mental anguish ends. Roland has now completed the task of bringing companions into his world.

Following the path of the Beam again, the ka-tet befriends an unusually intelligent billy-bumbler (which looks like a combination of badger, raccoon and dog with parrot-like speaking ability, long neck, curly tail, retractable claws and a high degree of animal intelligence) whom Jake names Oy, who joins them on their quest. In River Crossing, a small, almost deserted town, Roland is given a silver cross and a courtly tribute by the town's last, ancient citizens.

The ka-tet continues on the Path of the Beam to the city of Lud. Before arriving there, the ka-tet hear the drum beat from the song "Velcro Fly" by ZZ Top playing from the city, although Eddie at first cannot remember where he has heard the rhythm before. Later, the drums are revealed as the "god-drums" to which the inhabitants of Lud constantly fight. The ancient, once high-tech city has been ravaged by centuries of war, with the residents being divided into two factions: the "Pubes" and the "Grays". One of the surviving Gray fighters, Gasher, kidnaps Jake by taking advantage of the near-accident the team faced while crossing a decaying bridge (which looks like the George Washington Bridge of NYC). Roland and Oy must then track them through a man-made labyrinth in the city and into the sewers in order to rescue the boy from Gasher and his leader, the Tick-Tock Man. Jake manages to shoot the Tick-Tock Man, leaving him for dead. The ka-tet is reunited at the Cradle of Lud, a train station which houses a monorail that they use to escape Lud before its destruction brought about by the monorail's AI known as Blaine the Mono. The "Ageless Stranger" (an enemy whom the Man in Black warned Roland that he must slay) arrives to recruit the badly-injured Tick-Tock Man as his servant.

Centuries of system degradation have caused Blaine to go insane. Once the travelers are aboard, it releases poison gas to kill the entire population of Lud, then announces its intention to derail itself with them aboard once it reaches the end of its line in Topeka. However, Roland persuades it to undertake a riddle contest, with the safety of the ka-tet guaranteed if they win. Blaine speeds through the Waste Lands, a radioactive expanse of mutated animals and ancient ruins created by something that is claimed to have been far worse than a nuclear war, on the way to Topeka.

== Twelve portals and guardians ==
The Dark Tower stands at the intersection of six Beams that support it. Each Beam has a Portal at both ends, and each of these Portals (twelve in all) is guarded by a different creature. The nature of the Beams, Portals, and Guardians is gradually revealed throughout the story. The cyborg bear Shardik was created by North Central Positronics Ltd., possibly connected to the mysterious Sombra Corporation, as a technological replacement for the original Guardian of that Portal. At the Cradle of Lud, Eddie and Susannah find sculptures of the Guardians incorporated into the exterior of the building.

The pairings as mentioned in the story are:

- Bear - Turtle
- Horse - Dog
- Fish - Rat
- Elephant - Wolf
- Lion - Eagle
- Bat - Hare

== Film ==
Stephen King and Nikolaj Arcel have confirmed that the 2017 film The Dark Tower is a sequel to the events of The Dark Tower book series, following Roland Deschain on his "last time round" the cycle to the titular Dark Tower, equipped with the Horn of Eld. The film was released on August 4, 2017 in 3D and 2D by Columbia Pictures. The film has been described as a combination of the first novel, The Gunslinger, and of The Waste Lands, while also incorporating significant story points from The Wind Through the Keyhole.
