= The Oracle and the Mountains =

Short story by Stephen King

- Short story by Stephen King
- Country: United States
- Language: English
- Genre: Fantasy

Publication
- Published in: The Magazine of Fantasy and Science Fiction
- Publisher: Mercury Press
- Media type: Print (Magazine)
- Publication date: February 1981

Chronology
- Series: The Dark Tower
The Way Station	The Slow Mutants

"The Oracle and the Mountains" is a short story by American writer Stephen King, originally published in The Magazine of Fantasy and Science Fiction in February 1981. In 1982, "The Oracle and the Mountains" was collected with several other stories King published in The Magazine of Fantasy and Science Fiction as The Dark Tower: The Gunslinger. "The Oracle and the Mountains" formed the third chapter of the book, and was slightly revised for the inclusion.

== Plot summary ==
Roland and Jake manage to make their way out of the desert, into lusher territory. They come across a Speaking Ring. At night, Jake is drawn to the ring by the Oracle contained within, but Roland saves the boy before the Oracle can drain him to death via sexual intercourse.

Roland restrains Jake at their campsite and gives him the jawbone taken from the skeleton in the way station, as a means of warding off the Oracle's influence. He then goes down to the Speaking Ring, taking mescaline to fortify himself. When he reaches the ring, he has a powerful psychosexual exchange with the Oracle, who tells him of Eddie Dean and Susannah Dean.

The next day they leave the campsite and eventually come to a mountain. The man in black is there, and taunts Roland, telling him that only the two of them will speak on the other side. Roland asks Jake to make his choice as to whether he wishes to leave the gunslinger or accompany him, and Jake agrees to come with him, knowing that Roland plans to sacrifice him in order to reach the man in black.

== See also ==
- Short fiction by Stephen King
