= The Dark Tower IV: Wizard and Glass =

1997 fantasy novel by American writer Stephen King

- First edition cover
- Author: Stephen King
- Audio read by: Frank Muller
- Cover artist: Dave McKean
- Language: English
- Series: The Dark Tower
- Genre: Dark fantasy, science fiction
- Publisher: Grant
- Publication date: August 9, 1997
- Publication place: United States
- Media type: Print (Hardcover)
- Pages: 787
- ISBN: 978-1-880418-38-3
- Preceded by: The Waste Lands
- Followed by: Wolves of the Calla (publication); The Wind Through the Keyhole (chronological)

The Dark Tower IV: Wizard and Glass: Regard, or simply Wizard and Glass, is a fantasy novel by American writer Stephen King. The fourth book in the Dark Tower series, published in 1997 it placed fourth in the annual Locus Poll for best fantasy novel. Dave McKean created eighteen Illustrations for The Dark Tower IV: Wizard and Glass. The original eighteen illustrations appear only in the first edition hardback and trade paperback released in 1997.

== Synopsis ==
Shortly after the end of the previous novel, Jake, Eddie, Susannah and Roland fruitlessly riddle Blaine the Mono for several hours. Eddie eventually defeats the mad computer by telling childish jokes. Unable to handle Eddie's "illogical" riddles, Blaine short-circuits and crashes at the end of its line in Topeka, with the group suffering only minor injuries. The journey has brought them several thousand miles closer to the Dark Tower.

The four gunslingers and their billy-bumbler companion Oy disembark at the Topeka railway station, which to their surprise is located in the Topeka, Kansas, of the 1980s. The city is deserted, as this version of the world has been depopulated by a pandemic. The world also has some other minor differences with the one(s) known to Eddie, Jake and Susannah; for instance, the Kansas City baseball team is the Monarchs (as opposed to the Royals), and Nozz-A-La is a popular soft drink. The ka-tet leaves the city via the Kansas Turnpike. As they camp one night next to a dimensional hole which Roland calls a "thinny", the gunslinger tells the apprentices of his past, and his first encounter with a thinny.

At the beginning of the story-within-the-story, Roland (age fourteen) discovers his mother's affair with their counselor, wizard Marten Broadcloak. Roland fights his mentor Cort to earn his guns and get revenge, when his father, Steven, reveals to have already known of the affair. Steven sends Roland and his best friends Alain Johns and Cuthbert Allgood east to deal with other matters. The three arrive in the Barony of Mejis, in the town of Hambry, where they meet Mayor Thorin and Chancellor Rimer, among other high officials. Roland befriends Susan Delgado, the Mayor's promised concubine, come Reaping Day, this world's analogue to New Year's. The three friends act under the pretense of gathering information on resources for Gilead, their hometown, but secretly try to discover a plot by John Farson, the Good Man, who plans to invade Gilead.

Roland, Alain and Cuthbert butt heads with the Big Coffin Hunters, a trio led by a failed gunslinger, who have marked the three for dead after an altercation in a bar. The Hunters are actually working with Farson, alongside the Mayor and Chancellor. Farson is using the believed defunct oil tankers in the nearby Citgo oil plant to fuel his war machines. Roland and Susan engage in sexual intercourse on several occasions, clouding Roland’s mind and making him nearly forget about the reason he was sent to Hambry. The relationship nearly results in a permanent split between the three friends. Meanwhile, Eldred Jonas, one of the Hunters, has entrusted Rhea of the Cöös with Maerlyn’s Grapefruit, the pink Wizards Glass, which can show the future to the user.

Infatuated with the Glass, Rhea uses it for extended periods of time, starving herself and her pets. With it, she is able to learn of Roland and Susan’s affair and nearly hypnotize Susan to cut off her hair. Mayor Thorin is killed by Roy Depape and Chancellor Rimer is killed by Clay Reynolds, the other two Hunters, and frames the apprentice gunslingers for their deaths. Susan breaks Roland, Alain, and Cuthbert out of jail and they go into hiding as the Hunters prepare Farson for invasion. The four, alongside a mentally disabled boy named Sheemie, get ready to ambush the party. Roland plans to draw the party into Eyebolt Canyon and draw them into the thinny hiding inside the caves. Rhea uses the glass to tell Reynolds the location of Susan, and he captures her.

Susan is taken back to the Mayor’s home, where she is guarded by his wife Olive. Sheemie breaks into the home, and rescues Susan with Olive’s help. She orders Sheemie to return to town to ward off anyone attempting to find the two, who are later found by Reynolds again. He kills Olive and captures Susan again. Meanwhile, Roland, Alain and Cuthbert launch an attack on Farson’s henchmen, killing them all, including two Hunters: Roy Depape and Jonas. Roland takes the Wizard’s Glass from the latter and uses it on himself. The glass tells him his future and starts his obsession with the Dark Tower; finding it becomes his top priority.

The three then assault George Latigo's (another one of Farson’s employees) encampment, blowing up the oil tankers. They run off towards Eyebolt Canyon, tricking Latigo’s men to follow them. Roland traps them by setting fire to the brush at the entrance of the canyon, killing them by sending them straight to the thinny. Roland’s tale ends with the glass showing Roland a vision of Susan's death (burned at the stake as a harvest sacrifice for colluding with Roland) and of his future. The visions send him into a stupor, from which he eventually recovers—at which point the glass torments him with further visions, this time of events that he was not present for but nonetheless shaped his fate and Susan's.

In the morning, Roland's new ka-tet comes to a suspiciously familiar emerald city. The wizard inside is revealed to be Marten Broadcloak, also known as Randall Flagg. Inside the palace, the five are tormented by a loud voice, telling the group to renounce the Tower and return home. The voice belongs to the Tick-Tock Man, who was rescued by Flagg at the end of the third novel, and is quickly disposed of. Since Flagg has bewitched Roland's guns to misfire against him, Roland shoots at him with Jake's Ruger. However, he misses, giving Flagg time to flee. In his place he leaves the Wizard's Glass, which shows the ka-tet the day Roland accidentally killed his own mother. Despite Roland's history of bringing calamity to his friends and loved ones, Eddie, Susannah and Jake refuse to abandon him. The group once more sets off for the Dark Tower, following the Path of the Beam.

== Connections with other books ==
In this novel, the ka-tet appear in a version of Topeka, Kansas in the 1980s. The city is deserted, as this version of the world has been depopulated by the influenza of King's novel The Stand. Links between these books also include the following reference to The Walkin' Dude from The Stand on page 95, "Someone had spray-painted over both signs marking the ramp's ascending curve. On the one reading St. Louis 215, someone had slashed watch out for the walking dude", among others. Readers of the uncut version of The Stand may be confused by the dates given in the book. The uncut edition takes place in 1990, while Wizard and Glass brings the ka-tet to that world in 1986. When The Stand was first published, it took place in 1980. It may be said that this is "another when" than the novel The Stand, as pointed out by Roland. "There are other worlds than these," says Roland. Roland's ka-tet later appears in places similar to the Emerald City from The Wonderful Wizard of Oz. The parallels between the stories continue inside, where the Wizard is revealed to be Roland's old nemesis Marten Broadcloak, also known as Randall Flagg.
