= The Dark Tower: The Wind Through the Keyhole =

2012 fantasy novel by Stephen King

- First edition cover
- Author: Stephen King
- Cover artist: Jae Lee
- Language: English
- Series: The Dark Tower
- Genre: Dark fantasy Science fiction Western fiction
- Publisher: Grant
- Publication date: February 21, 2012
- Publication place: United States
- Media type: Print (Hardcover)
- Pages: 336
- ISBN: 1-880418-76-2
- Preceded by: Wizard and Glass
- Followed by: Wolves of the Calla

The Dark Tower: The Wind Through the Keyhole is a 2012 fantasy novel by American writer Stephen King. As part of the Dark Tower series, it is the eighth novel, but it is set chronologically between volumes four and five. First mentioned by King in 2009, after the controversial ending of the seventh novel in 2004, the book was officially announced on King's official website on March 10, 2011.

== Background information ==
In an interview in March 2009, King stated, describing an idea for a new short story he recently had: "And then I thought, 'Well, why don't I find three more like this and do a book that would be almost like modern fairy tales?' Then this thing started to add on bits and pieces so I guess it will be a novel." While promoting his novel Under the Dome, King confirmed this during his TimesTalk event at The TimesCenter in New York City in November 2009, and the next day King's official site posted the information that its tentative title was The Wind Through the Keyhole.

On December 1, 2009, Stephen King posted a poll on his website, asking visitors to vote for which novel he should write next and it was announced at the start of 2010 that The Wind Through the Keyhole had not received most votes, though it was a close call with Doctor Sleep. Nonetheless, both books were published several years later.

== Publication information ==
The artwork for the volume was provided by Jae Lee, the main illustrator for Marvel Comics' adaptations of King's other work, The Dark Tower. It was published in various editions by Donald M. Grant, Publisher, Inc. in February 2012 and in a mass market edition by Scribner in May.

The design of the Scribner edition cover was done by Platinum Fmd, the creators of the cover for King's 2009 novel Under the Dome, and Rex Bonomelli, Scribner's art director and designer. The preliminary version was simpler than the final version, which was designed to "give the cover a little more drama".

== Plot ==
The novel begins with Roland and his ka-tet arriving at a river on their journey to the Dark Tower. An elderly man who operates a ferry gets them across the river, and warns them that a severe depression (starkblast) is coming, and that they can find shelter in a building a few miles ahead. They reach the shelter just in time, and while they wait out the storm, Roland tells them of an adventure in his youth to keep them occupied: "The Skin-Man."

Following the death of Roland's mother (Gabrielle Deschain), his father sends him and his friend Jamie De Curry west to the town of Debaria on a mission to capture the Skin-Man, an apparent shape-shifter who terrorizes the town and surrounding areas by transforming into various animals at night and embarking on murderous rampages. Roland and Jamie take a train to Debaria, but it derails before arriving and they must finish their journey on horse. On their way, they pass through a town known as Serenity, a community of women where Roland's mother lived after suffering a mental breakdown following her affair with Marten Broadcloak, an alias of the sorcerer Randall Flagg and Roland's nemesis. It is here that they learn of a woman attacked by the Skin-Man and hear her tale.

Roland and Jamie arrive in Debaria, and with the help of the local Sheriff, Hugh Peavy, they determine that the Skin-Man is most likely a salt miner from a nearby village. The next morning, they discover that another brutal attack has occurred overnight on a local farm. They investigate the scene, and discover a single survivor, a small boy named Bill, who has lost his father in the attack. Roland and Jamie determine that the murderer left the scene on horseback, and Roland sends Jamie to the salt mines to round up every miner who has a horse or is able to ride one. While returning to Debaria with Bill, Roland performs his hypnotism trick with one of his spare rounds of ammunition. Under hypnosis, Bill relates what he saw of the Skin-Man; Bill tells Roland that he saw the Skin-Man in his human form after the attack, but only glimpsed his feet. He states that the Skin-Man had a tattoo of a blue ring around his ankle. The tattoo indicates that the man spent time in the prison at a (now abandoned) military barracks further west of Debaria. That area had fallen to the chaos of John Farson, the Good Man, within the last generation. Back in town, Roland brings Bill to a cell in the Sheriff's station. He plans to walk each suspect past Bill in the hopes the young boy can identify the Skin-Man, or that the Skin-Man will reveal himself by fleeing due to fear of being identified. While Roland and Bill wait for Jamie to round up the suspects, Roland tells Bill a story from his own childhood, "The Wind Through the Keyhole."

In this story (within a story), a boy named Tim Ross lives with his mother Nell in a forgotten village that fears the annual collection of property taxes by a man named The Covenant Man. Tim recently lost his father, who was said to have been killed by a dragon while in the woods chopping trees. After the death of his father, Nell, no longer able to pay the taxes to keep their home, marries his father's best friend and business partner Bern Kells, who moves in with them. Kells is a mean man, prone to heavy drinking, who begins to abuse both Tim and Nell. One day The Covenant Man comes to collect the taxes, and he secretly tells Tim to meet him later in the woods. During this meeting, The Covenant Man reveals to Tim that it was actually Kells who killed his father, not a dragon, and with help of a scrying bowl shows Kells beating his mother, causing her to go blind. Later, The Covenant Man sends Tim a vision telling him that if Tim again visits The Covenant Man in the woods, he will give Tim magic that will allow his mother to see again. Tim, armed with a gun given to him by his school teacher, journeys into the dangerous woods, and is led into a swamp by the mischievous fairy, Armaneeta. Here, Tim almost becomes victim to a dragon and other mysterious swamp creatures, but he is saved by his gun as well as a group of friendly swamp people, who mistake him for a gunslinger. The swamp people guide him to the far side of the swamp, and equip him with a small mechanical talking device from the 'Old People' that helps guide him on his journey. Eventually, Tim arrives at a Dogan where he finds a caged 'tyger', which wears the key to the Dogan around its neck. A starkblast approaches, and Tim, realizing this is likely a trap set for him by The Covenant Man, befriends the tyger. Tim and the tyger ride out the storm under a magical protective blanket. The next morning, Tim discovers that the tyger is actually Maerlyn, a white magician, who had been trapped in the cage for years due to black magic. Maerlyn gives Tim a potion to cure his mother's blindness and sends him back to his mother on the flying magic blanket. Returning home, Tim brings sight back to his mother. Tim is attacked by Kells, who had secretly entered the home as Tim tended to his mother, but the boy is saved by his mother, who kills Kells with her late husband's ax.

As Roland finishes telling "The Wind Through the Keyhole," Jamie arrives back in Debaria with the salt mine suspects. Young Bill is able to identify the Skin-Man due to his ankle tattoo and an associated scar, at which time the Skin-Man transforms into a snake, and kills two people. Roland shoots the snake with a specially-crafted silver bullet (which he had made upon their arrival in town), killing it. Roland and Jamie travel back to Serenity, where the women agree to adopt young Bill, who is now an orphan. The women also give Roland a note written by his mother during her stay in Serenity. In this note, his mother (Gabrielle Deschain) reveals that Marten has predicted that Roland will one day kill her. Although this has caused her to slowly lose her sanity, in the end she forgives Roland and asks that he forgive her infidelity to his father and betrayal of Gilead in return.

With his Skin-Man story finished, Roland and his ka-tet find that the starkblast has passed, leveling every structure in the area except for the building in which they took shelter. They soon pack their belongings and resume their journey toward the Dark Tower.

== Reception ==
An early review of the book by Kevin Quigley noted how well it meshed with novels in the series that came before and after: "Most importantly, it manages to retain the quest structure of the first four novels and also subtly underscores King's obsession with the nature of fiction in the latter books, providing a necessary bridge between the two halves of the series." Zack Handlen too wondered if the late addition would stand up and found it in fact better than other parts of the sequence: “Where other books of the Dark Tower sequence got bogged down by a vain effort to make sense of it all, Wind Through The Keyhole has a light, easy touch." While impressed on the whole, James Kidd writing in The Independent noted the book's episodic nature, commenting that “it isn’t a novel but a triptych of novellas nesting inside one another." He criticized the quality of the prose, however, describing it as a mixture of “King’s pithy folk wisdom and cod Shakespeare."
