= The Dark Tower: The Gunslinger =

Fantasy novel by Stephen King

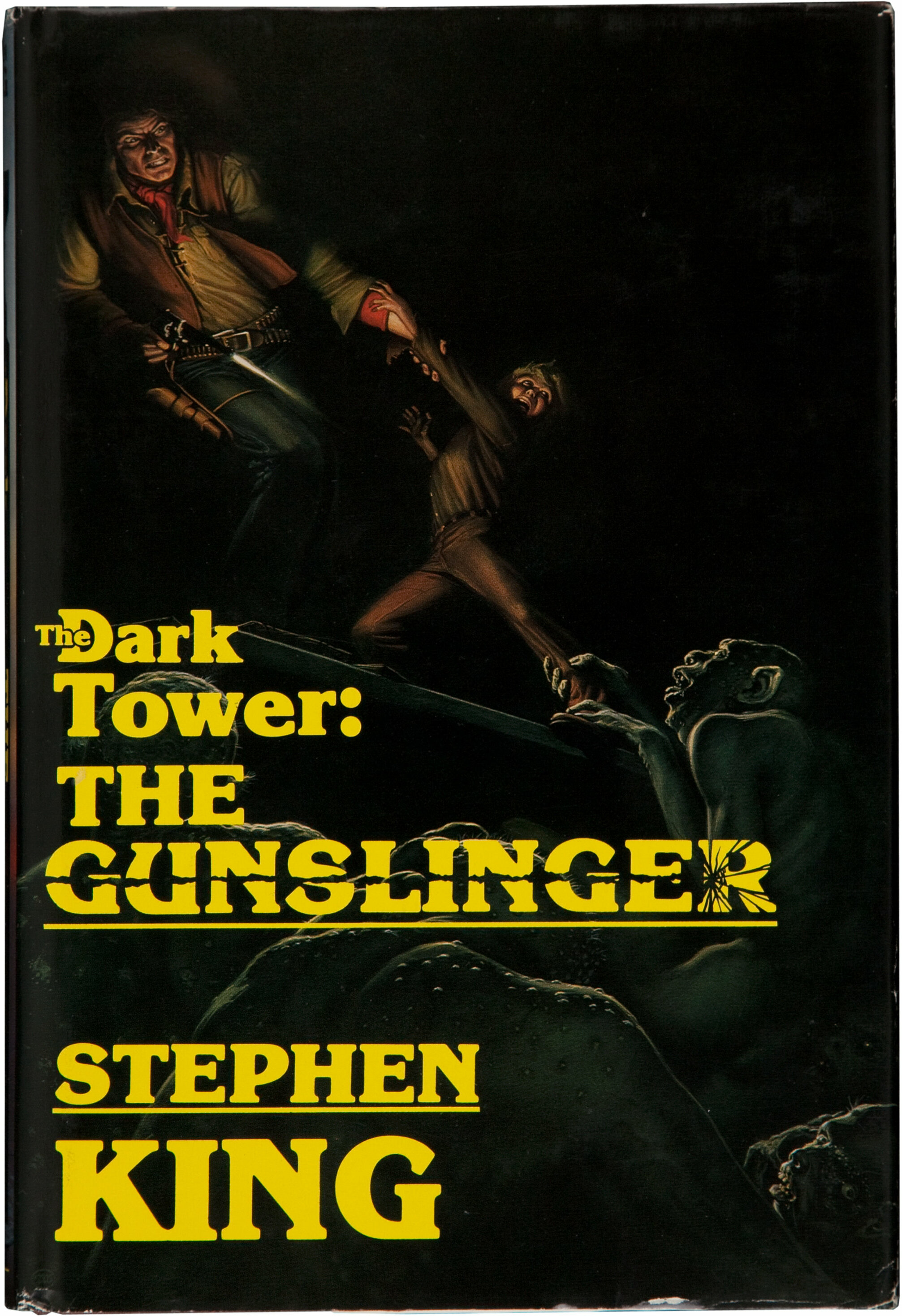
- First edition cover
- Author: Stephen King
- Audio read by: Frank Muller
- Cover artist: Michael Whelan
- Language: English
- Series: The Dark Tower
- Genre: Dark fantasy, western
- Publisher: Grant
- Publication date: June 10, 1982
- Publication place: United States
- Media type: Print (Hardcover)
- Pages: 224
- ISBN: 978-0-937986-50-9
- Followed by: The Drawing of the Three

The Dark Tower: The Gunslinger is a dark-fantasy novel by American author Stephen King. It is the first volume in his Dark Tower series. The Gunslinger was first published in 1982 as a fix-up novel, joining five short stories that had been published between 1978 and 1981. King substantially revised the novel in 2003; this version has remained in print ever since, with the subtitle "RESUMPTION". The story centers on Roland Deschain, the last gunslinger, who has been chasing his adversary, "the man in black," for many years. The novel fuses Western fiction with fantasy, science fiction, and horror, following Roland's trek through a vast desert and beyond in search of the man in black. Roland meets several people along his journey, including a boy named Jake, who travels with him part of the way.

== Background and publication ==
The novel was inspired by Robert Browning's poem "Childe Roland to the Dark Tower Came" (1855), which King read as a sophomore at the University of Maine. King explains that he "played with the idea of trying a long romantic novel embodying the feel, if not the exact sense, of the Browning poem." King started writing this novel in 1970 on a ream of bright green paper that he found at the library. The five stories that constitute the novel were originally published in The Magazine of Fantasy and Science Fiction:

1. "The Gunslinger" (October 1978)
2. "The Way Station" (April 1980)
3. "The Oracle and the Mountains" (February 1981)
4. "The Slow Mutants" (July 1981)
5. "The Gunslinger and the Dark Man" (November 1981)

It took King twelve-and-a-half years to finish the novel. The finished product was first published by Donald M. Grant, Publisher, Inc. as a limited edition in 1982. The following year, because the Pet Sematary cover noted The Gunslinger among King's previous works, many fans called the offices of King, Grant, and Doubleday wanting more information on the already-out-of-print book. This led to another run of ten thousand copies. In 1988, Plume released it in trade paperback form. In 2003, the novel was reissued in a revised and expanded version with modified language and added and changed scenes intended to resolve inconsistencies with the later books in the series. It is dedicated to Edward L. Ferman, long-time editor of The Magazine of Fantasy and Science Fiction.

== Setting ==
The book tells the story of The Gunslinger, Roland of Gilead, and his quest to catch the man in black, the first of many steps toward Roland's ultimate destination, The Dark Tower. The main story takes place in a world somewhat similar to the Old West but in an alternate timeframe or parallel universe. Roland exists in a world that has "moved on." This world has a few things in common with our own, however, including memories of the old song "Hey Jude" and the child's rhyme that begins "Beans, Beans, the Musical Fruit", as well as the existence of hamburgers and beer. Vestiges of forgotten or skewed versions of real-world technology also appear, such as a reference to a gas pump that is worshipped as a god named "Amoco" and an abandoned way station with a water pump powered by an "atomic slug."

== Plot ==
As Roland travels across the desert in search of the man in black, whom he knows as Walter, he encounters a farmer named Brown and his raven, Zoltan. Roland spends the night there and recalls his time spent in Tull, a small town Roland passed through not long before meeting them. The man in black had also stayed in the town; he brought a dead man stricken by addiction to the opiate-like "devil grass" back to life and left a trap for Roland. Roland meets the leader of the local church, who reveals to him that the man in black impregnated her with a demon. She turns the entire town against Roland, who is forced to kill everyone. When he awakens the morning after telling Brown the story, his mule is dead, forcing him to continue on foot.

Roland arrives at an abandoned way station and first encounters Jake Chambers, a young boy. Roland collapses from dehydration, and Jake brings him water. Jake remembers neither how long he has been at the way station nor exactly how he got there, and he hid when the man in black passed through. Roland hypnotizes Jake to determine the details of where he came from and discovers he died in a different universe that appears much closer in nature to our own. He was pushed in front of a car while walking to school in Manhattan. Before they leave, Roland and Jake search for food in a cellar and encounter a demon, which uses a skeleton entombed behind a wall to speak to them. Roland masters the demon and takes the skeleton's jawbone.

Roland and Jake make their way out of the desert. Roland rescues Jake from an encounter with a succubus and gives him the jawbone to use as a protective charm against it. Roland leaves him at camp and couples with the succubus, who is also an oracle, to learn more about his fate and the path to the Dark Tower. In a flashback, it is revealed that Roland is the son of Steven Deschain, a Gunslinger and lord of Gilead. Roland received brutal training at the hands of his teacher, Cort. Roland was tricked into a premature test of manhood by dueling with Cort at age 14, earlier than any other apprentice. He was provoked by Marten, who served as Steven's wizard and seduced Roland's mother, Gabrielle. That was a time of instability and revolution. Roland defeated Cort in battle by choosing his hawk, David, as his weapon and sacrificing him to distract Cort.

Jake and Roland see the man in black at the mountain. He says that only he and Roland will meet on the other side, exacerbating Jake's fears that Roland will either kill or abandon him. Roland and Jake make their way into twisting tunnels within the mountain, traveling on an old railway handcar. They are attacked by subterranean creatures called "Slow Mutants." At the tunnel's exit, they continue on foot. As the track on which they are traveling begins to break, Roland lets Jake fall into an abyss and continues his quest.

After sacrificing Jake in the mountain, Roland makes his way down to speak with the man in black. The man in black reads Roland's fate from a pack of cards that includes omens such as "the sailor," "the prisoner," "the lady of shadows," "death," and the Tower itself. The man in black states that he is a pawn of Roland's true enemy, who now controls the Dark Tower itself. The man in black also reveals that he was Marten. He then sends Roland a vision of the universe, zooming out past a red planet covered in canals, a ring of rocks, a large stormy planet, a ringed planet, and then to galaxies and beyond, attempting to frighten Roland by showing him how truly insignificant he is. The man in black then asks Roland to renounce his quest. Roland refuses, and the man in black tells him to go west before putting him to sleep. When Roland awakens, 10 years have passed, and there is a skeleton next to him that he assumes to be the man in black. Roland takes the jawbone from the skeleton, as a replacement for the one he gave to Jake, before traveling to the shore of the Western Sea.

== Revised and expanded edition ==
King revised The Gunslinger in 2003. In his introduction to the new edition, King stated that he felt the original version was "dry" and difficult for new readers to access. He also made the storytelling more linear and the book's plot more consistent with the series ending. Other changes were made to resolve continuity errors introduced by later volumes. The added material was over 9000 words (35 pages) in length. Some changes include:

- Removal of a reference to Roland reading a magazine in Tull. Later information presented in The Drawing of the Three suggests paper is a scarcity in Roland's world.
- Reference to 12 years having passed since the fall of Gilead, which happened when Roland was a teenager, is changed to "unknown years." Otherwise, it would be deduced that Roland is in his 30s, whereas later books imply Roland is ancient.
- Likewise, the man in black originally says he is "nearly immortal;" in the revision, he says this of both himself and Roland.
- "[Roland] didn't know where Cort was" becomes "Cort was dead" because the Fall of Gilead was not fleshed out until later books.
- Roland's cold-hearted killing of Allie is changed to make him appear more humane. Originally, when the town of Tull turns on Roland, Allie is seized by a townsperson and used as a human shield. She begs Roland not to fire before he guns down both her and her captor. In the revised version, she has been driven mad by Walter by the time she is seized, and she begs Roland to put her out of her misery.
- The town of Farson is changed to Taunton because John Farson is a character in the later books.
- References to the Beast were changed to refer to the Crimson King, who otherwise is not mentioned in the series until The Waste Lands.
- "Blue Heaven" and "Algul Siento," terms revealed in the final books, are mentioned.
- A single Taheen appears early in the revised version. The Taheen are a race of creatures that wouldn't originally appear until the final three books.
- A major textual change is the fate and identity of the man in black. In the original text, Walter's death at the end of the story is of no uncertainty to Roland. In the revised edition, Roland speculates whether his discovery of Walter's bones is some trick or whether Walter has truly died. The original text also kept Walter and Marten Broadcloak completely disambiguated. Even after the death of Walter, Broadcloak was still to be found and killed. Later, in Wizard and Glass, Walter and Marten, along with Randall Flagg, are all revealed to be the same person. Although no reference to the name "Flagg" is made in the revised edition of The Gunslinger, all references to Walter and Marten are altered so that it is plausible they are the same man.
- Jake Chambers, originally nine years old, was made 10–11 years old in the revised edition.
- In general, the world the gunslinger walked through in the original text was a run-down version of our own. The text mentions England, the star Polaris, Mars, Jesus and other biblical figures, Easter, All-Saint's Eve (Halloween), and Greek and Egyptian gods. In the revision, most of these references were removed to make Roland's world only vaguely like ours.
- In the expanded edition of the novel, on the last page before the text, the word RESUMPTION appears. In the "Argument" foreword for Wolves of the Calla, King explains that this is the subtitle of the novel.

== Film ==
Stephen King and Nikolaj Arcel have confirmed that the 2017 film The Dark Tower is a sequel to the events of the Dark Tower book series, following Roland Deschain on his "last time round" the cycle to the titular Dark Tower, equipped with the Horn of Eld. The film was released August 4, 2017 by Columbia Pictures. The film has been stated to be a combination of the events of The Gunslinger and of the third novel The Waste Lands, while also incorporating significant story points from The Dark Tower.
