= Crimson King =

Fictional character by Stephen King

The Crimson King
- The Dark Tower character
- The Crimson King as illustrated by Michael Whelan.
- First appearance: Insomnia
- Last appearance: The Dark Tower VII: The Dark Tower (in chronological sequence)
- Created by: Stephen King

In-universe information
- Aliases: Los'; Dis; Ram Abbalah; The Red King; Lord of Chaos; Lord of Discordia; Lord of Spiders; Satan
- Nicknames: Red Daddy; The Red King; Big Red; Mr Red
- Species: Trans-dimensional demon
- Gender: Male
- Occupation: Leader of the Random
- Relatives: Arthur Eld (father); Crimson Queen (mother); Mordred Deschain (son); Randall Flagg (cousin); Wizard's Rainbow (cousin); Roland Deschain (29th-generation half-nephew)
- Associates: Randall Flagg; Pennywise the Dancing Clown; The Breakers; Atropos

The Crimson King, known to some as Los', Dis, or Ram Abbalah, is a fictional character created by Stephen King and the main antagonist of King's eight-volume Dark Tower series, as well as the novels Insomnia (1994) and Black House (2001). Described as "Gan's crazy side", the Crimson King is the ultimate ruler of the Red (also called the Random and the Outer Dark), and the archetypal embodiment of evil in Stephen King's fictional multiverse. His goal is to topple the Dark Tower which serves as the linchpin of time and space, destroying the multitude of universes which revolve around it so that he can rule in the primordial chaos which follows.

== Appearances ==
=== Literature ===
The Crimson King is introduced in the Stephen King novel Insomnia, where he is depicted as a powerful and mysterious entity that forces others to do his bidding. He seeks to kill a child named Patrick Danville who is prophesied to aid in bringing the King down; he is defeated during a confrontation with that novel's protagonist, Ralph Roberts.

He makes his next appearance at the end of Black House, where he is revealed to be responsible for the events of that novel and is seen to have been weakened by the actions of protagonist Jack Sawyer and his allies.

In the Dark Tower novels, the King is revealed to be behind the destruction of the beams that hold up the Dark Tower, which holds reality and all of the universes together. He is also master of the series' main villain, Walter O'Dim/Padick. He is shown to have gone insane and his intentions are not quite clear beyond that he wishes to destroy the Tower and possibly rule the darkness that would follow. He rules from the lands of Discordia and, as his insanity worsens, he kills nearly everyone in his employ and even himself. He thus becomes undead and possibly immune to protagonist Roland Deschain's guns. He reaches the tower before Roland, but is trapped on a balcony on one of its lower levels. When Roland finally meets the King at the climax of the final Dark Tower novel, he appears as an old man with a white beard and blood-red eyes who throws "sneetches" from his imprisonment in the Tower. As previously predicted, Roland and Patrick Danville bring about the Crimson King's downfall. Patrick captures the King's image with his supernatural artistic abilities, using a mixture of Roland's blood and a rose's petals to finish the drawing; then he erases the King from existence, forever banishing him to some other world, or to the todash space between the worlds. Only his red eyes remain, trapped eternally on the balcony of the Tower.

=== Comics ===
Writer Robin Furth wrote a new backstory for the Crimson King in the Dark Tower comics. Here, the Crimson King was the bastard offspring of Arthur Eld, a legendary gunslinger, and the Crimson Queen, a demonic creature of the Prim – the chaotic primordial void from which the Dark Tower, and all universes, arose. With the aid of the wizard Maerlyn, the Crimson Queen took on human form and deceived Arthur Eld to achieve this union. Roland Deschain is himself a distant descendant of Eld; this makes the Crimson King Roland's half-uncle, albeit through many generations. This is the key through which Roland can defeat the King, as stated in a prophecy laid out during the course of the series. In the one-shot comic The Dark Tower: The Sorcerer, Randall Flagg and the Pink Grapefruit (one of the 13 Bends o' the Rainbow) refer to the Crimson King as their cousin.

=== Films ===
The 2017 The Dark Tower film only references the Crimson King; a spray-paint "All Hail the Crimson King" features on various surfaces near The Dixie Pig restaurant, along with his sigil, an open red eye.

== Characteristics ==
The Crimson King has taken many forms throughout the series. In The Dark Tower VI, Susannah Dean explains that, in her world, people see the Crimson King as a horned, red-skinned monster called Satan. As evidenced in Insomnia, the Crimson King is a shapeshifter; like the titular creature in It, he takes the form most terrifying to whoever confronts him. When he is injured by Ralph Roberts, he reverts first to a handsome, blonde man, and then to a creature Ralph is unable to see properly, suggesting that his true form is incomprehensible to human beings. When he finally appears near the end of the Dark Tower series, the Crimson King has the appearance of an old man with white hair and one fang, but in the comics he appears both as a monstrous entity with spiderlike characteristics, much like his son Mordred, as well as a bald man with a large tusk or horn on his head. Throughout all of his appearances his one defining characteristic is his blood red eyes, which fascinate anyone who looks into them. Patrick Danville also mentions that the King fades in and out of view due to his transcendent magical powers.

The Crimson King prefers to work from behind the scenes. His sigil, a glaring red eye, is seen throughout each of the books in which he has appeared. He employs other people to do his bidding, as well as numerous supernatural beings, including Atropos, Mr. Munshun, Dandelo, Randall Flagg, John Farson, and various vampires, low men, and taheen.

== In other King works ==
The Crimson King is also mentioned in the Stephen King novella Low Men in Yellow Coats, found within the 1999 collection Hearts in Atlantis.

== See also ==
- Touched by the Crimson King
