= Insomnia (novel) =

1994 novel by Stephen King

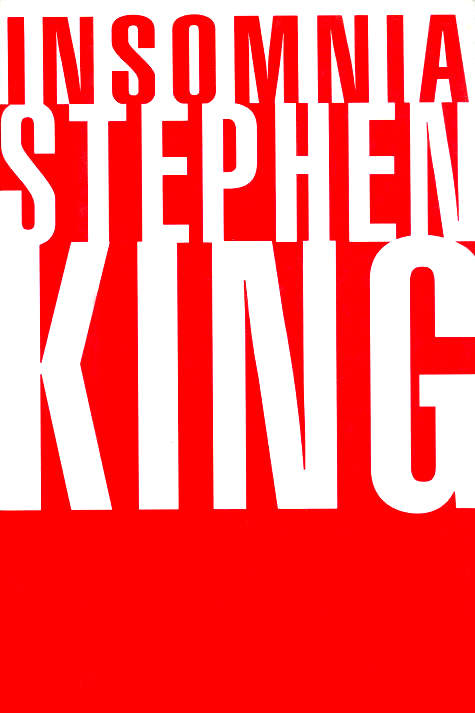
- First edition cover
- Author: Stephen King
- Language: English
- Genre: Horror, fantasy
- Publisher: Viking
- Publication date: October 10, 1994
- Publication place: United States
- Media type: Print (Hardcover and Paperback)
- Pages: 787 pages
- ISBN: 978-0-670-85503-2

Insomnia is a 1994 horror/fantasy novel by American writer Stephen King. It follows retired widower Ralph Roberts, whose increasing insomnia allows him to perceive auras and other hidden things, leading him to join a conflict between the forces of the Purpose and the Random. Like It and Dreamcatcher, the story is set in the fictional town of Derry, Maine. It includes connections to other Stephen King stories, particularly his novel series The Dark Tower. Insomnia was nominated for a Bram Stoker Award for Best Novel in 1994.

== Plot ==
The story is set in the fictional town of Derry, Maine. Retiree Ralph Roberts encounters his formerly good-natured acquaintance Ed Deepneau at the local airfield. Ed is aggressive and swearing obscenely at a driver he accuses of secretly transporting fetal tissue from abortions. Some months later, Ralph (now a widower) encounters Ed's wife Helen who has been badly beaten by her husband after having signed a pro-choice petition. Months later, Helen leaves Ed and hides at a women's shelter.

Ralph begins to suffer from sleep maintenance insomnia, waking earlier each night until he is barely able to sleep an hour each night. As his insomnia develops, he begins to see things invisible and intangible to others: colorful manifestations of life-force surrounding people (auras) and diminutive white-coated beings he calls "little bald doctors", based on their appearance. He gradually concludes these are not hallucinations but genuine things present on a different level of reality. He realizes that Ed also sees these things. Ralph's friend Lois Chasse admits to him that she too has recently begun seeing auras which she can interpret.

Ralph and Lois encounter two bald doctors, calling themselves Clotho and Lachesis, who act with dignity and free people from life when it is "their time" to pass away. A third bald doctor, Atropos, is a crazed rogue who seems to delight in disrupting lives and prematurely ending them. Ralph and Lois learn that life is largely governed by "The Purpose" and "The Random", forces or entities which are not enemies so much as opposites. Ed is one of a few very rare beings who is not assigned to either force and can, therefore, greatly change existence.

Ralph and Lois learn of the "Crimson King," a shape-shifting higher-dimensional being who feeds on negative emotions and craves chaos to rule over. The Crimson King has sent Atropos to manipulate Ed as part of a plan to upset the entire order of the universe. Unable to intervene directly, Clotho and Lachesis, agents of the Purpose, gave Ralph and Lois insomnia to help them perceive, gain and even access other levels of reality so they can defeat Atropos. The benign bald doctors describe these levels as beams of a "skyscraper", and Ralph has a vision of The Dark Tower, a representation of the multiverse.

Controversial pro-choice activist Susan Day is due to talk at the Derry civic center. Lois and Ralph see the building shrouded by a black aura, signifying a dark future. The Crimson King has been provoking Ed's feelings regarding abortion, turning him into a violent and paranoid fanatic. With a small plane containing C-4 explosives, Ed intends to make a kamikaze attack on the civic center during Day's speech, killing her and everyone within. Lois and Ralph are resentful at being manipulated by outside forces but decide they must prevent the attack.

Allies of Ed set fire to the shelter where Helen has been staying since leaving him. Ralph and Lois save the residents, then seek out Atropos. Ralph overcomes the malicious being, extracting a promise from Atropos that he will not interfere with him and Lois, knowing the little bald doctors are bound to their promises. Once released, Atropos torments Ralph with a vision of a car accident in the near future that will take the life of Helen's young daughter Natalie. Her death will be retaliation for Atropos not being able to interfere with Ralph.

Ralph tells the benign bald doctors he will not stop Ed unless they allow him to save Natalie later, offering his own life for hers. A higher-level entity briefly manifests, causing awe in Clotho and Lachesis as it declares that Ralph's terms are acceptable. He and Lois learn that "almost all of reality has stopped to watch the events unfolding," as the success or failure of Ed's attack could affect all of reality. The Crimson King's true target is not Day, as they had assumed, but a boy from the shelter who will be in the audience: Patrick Danville, a young artist prophesied to one day play an instrumental role in preserving the Dark Tower and aiding in the defeat of the Crimson King. The Crimson King has repeatedly tried to end the life of a "messiah" but in Derry, a place of convergence, this is now possible.

Ed takes off in his plane and Ralph fights him on board. The Crimson King manifests to prevent him from interrupting Ed's mission, but Ralph succeeds in causing the plane to crash some distance away from the center, surviving by shifting himself to a higher plane of reality before impact. Returning to his proper place and reality, Ralph and Lois fall in love and get married, gradually forgetting their adventures with the little bald doctors.

In an epilogue taking place some years later, Ralph again starts experiencing insomnia. He once again sees auras and eventually remembers the promise he made to exchange his life for Natalie's. He arrives in time to see the car from his vision appear and veer towards Natalie. Ralph pushes her to safety, losing his own life in the process. He dies peacefully with Lois at his side as Clotho and Lachesis watch over him.
