= List of The Dark Tower characters =

The Dark Tower is a series of eight novels written by American author Stephen King, which incorporate multiple genres including fantasy, science fantasy, horror and western. Below are The Dark Tower characters that come into play as the series progresses.

== Protagonists ==
=== Ka-tet of the Nineteen and/or Ninety and Nine ===
==== Roland Deschain ====
Roland Deschain, son of Steven Deschain, was born in the Barony of Gilead, in In-World. Roland is the last surviving gunslinger, a man whose goal is finding and climbing to the top of the Dark Tower, purported to be the very center of existence, so that he may right the wrongs in his land. This quest is his obsession, monomania and geas to Roland: In the beginning the success of the quest is more important than the lives of his family and friends. He is a man who lacks imagination, and this is one of the stated reasons for his survival against all odds: he can not imagine anything other than surviving to find the Tower.

==== Eddie Dean ====
Edward Cantor "Eddie" Dean first appears in The Drawing of the Three, in which Roland encounters three doors that open into the New York City of our world in different times. Through these doors, Roland draws companions who will join him on his quest, as the Man In Black foretold. The first to be drawn is Eddie Dean, a drug addict and a first-time cocaine mule. Eddie lives with his older brother and fellow junkie Henry, whom Eddie reveres despite the corrupting influence Henry has had upon his life. Roland helps Eddie fight off a gang of mobsters for whom he was transporting the cocaine, but not before Eddie discovers that Henry has died from an overdose of heroin in the company of the aforementioned mobsters (after which the mobsters decide to chop off Henry's head). It is because of Eddie's heroin addiction that he is termed 'The Prisoner' (the inscription above the door Roland draws Eddie from).

Roland also acquires a small quantity of medicine for his infection during the trip to Eddie's world, but this only temporarily quells the fever until he picks up a larger supply while inside the body of Jack Mort (see Antagonists below).

Eddie passes through the door into Roland's world, and faces heroin withdrawal symptoms, but despite his suffering, he also shows an affinity for the way of the gun—and a good deal of what Roland calls 'steel'. Unwillingly at first, Eddie becomes Roland's companion through Mid-World, and he soon falls in love with Susannah, the next member of Roland's ka-tet. Eddie and Susannah consider themselves husband and wife, although they never formally marry.

Roland and Eddie frequently clash due to their differing personalities; while Roland is often calculating and distant, Eddie is intuitive and emotionally present. Initially mistaken for a lack of seriousness, Eddie's frequent joking, emotional outbursts, and pop culture references irritated Roland; however, he earns Roland's respect by asserting his quick thinking and imagination to defeat Blaine the monorail during their 'riddle' duel in Wizard and Glass.

In the final novel, during the attack on Algul Siento, Eddie is shot and killed by Pimli Prentiss, the master of the establishment.

Roland also notes that Eddie's character strongly resembles that of Cuthbert, a gunslinger of Roland's past, and one of Roland's greatest friends. The character of Cuthbert is mentioned in Browning's poem and is described most fully in The Dark Tower IV: Wizard and Glass, although he is first mentioned in The Dark Tower: The Gunslinger.

==== Susannah Dean ====
Also hailing from New York City, Susannah is a black woman (although as a woman of 1964, she prefers the term "Negro" over the term considered appropriate in Eddie's time, "Black") with two major afflictions: her legs below the knees were severed in a subway accident, and a childhood head injury left her with dual personalities, which Eddie incorrectly labels schizophrenia. She is "The Lady of Shadows", the second companion predicted by Walter to be drawn into Roland's world via the mysterious doors.

Initially, her dominant personality is that of Odetta Susannah Holmes, a well-mannered but priggish woman active in the civil rights movement. At times, however, she is taken over by Detta Susannah Walker—murderously psychotic, incredibly crafty, completely unbreakable—whom neither Eddie nor Roland can control. Neither Odetta nor Detta are aware of the existence of the other, and confabulate memories for the periods when they are not the dominant personality. Roland manages to resolve these personalities by forcing Detta to look through the third door while he himself looks out of it, forcing Detta and Odetta to see themselves for what they really are, and almost kill each other upon realising their presence. However, Odetta chooses to embrace Detta, and the personalities are integrated into a single, far more balanced individual, known as Susannah Dean, Eddie's wife, although they were never formally married. Susannah has access to the memories and personalities of both Holmes and Walker, and can call upon their skills and temperaments at will.

During the drawing of Jake, she submits to sex with the demon of the doorway, in order to distract it, and afterwards, she becomes pregnant. Susannah shares the experience of her pregnancy with a demon-turned-mortal named Mia, resulting in Susannah housing yet another personality in her mind. Mia takes over Susannah's body (and melds with it, giving her legs for a short while) and runs in it to yet another when of New York, this one circa 1999, to give birth to the demon child.

Susannah is the only member of either of Roland's two ka-tets to leave him voluntarily without dying. She asks Patrick Danville to draw an "unfound" door she has seen in her dreams, then uses it to depart from Roland's world and enter a parallel version of New York in which Eddie and Jake are alive. She takes one of Roland's guns with her into this world, but discards it after finding that it has become rusty and useless.

==== Jake Chambers ====
Jake Chambers is an eleven-year-old boy from the New York of 1977, and is considered by Roland to be his "true son". Jake's given name is John, but he prefers to be known by Jake, and is called "'Bama" by his housekeeper, who is far closer to him than his parents. In his home world, he dies at the hands of Jack Mort (who Jake initially believes is Walter) and ends up in Roland's world as a result. The gunslinger and the boy travel together in pursuit of the Man in Black, developing a strong bond along the way. However, in order to reach the Man in Black, Roland lets Jake fall to his death.

The person Roland allowed to die reappears in Roland's mind in The Waste Lands resulting in a paradox. Since Roland (in The Drawing of the Three) prevented Mort from shoving Jake into traffic, he never died, therefore he never appeared in Mid-World and was never left to die under the mountains. Jake and Roland, however, can remember both timelines, and the knowledge is slowly driving them insane.

In the first half of The Waste Lands, Roland's ka-tet figure out a way to draw Jake into Mid-World, where he belongs (an action which finishes the real Drawing of the Three, Jack Mort never having been intended to join the ka-tet). Eddie is driven to whittle a key out of wood as they approach a Speaking Ring, where he draws a door on the ground, this one guarded by an invisible demon. Susannah distracts the demon by allowing it to copulate with her, while Eddie perfects the key and uses it to open the door. On the other side, in 1977, Jake finds a vacant lot that contains a silver key and a rose that represents the Dark Tower. Guided by their dreams of each other, Eddie's younger self from this time leads Jake to an abandoned house, filled with evil spirits and a horrendous gatekeeper. Jake fights through them to reach and unlock one particular door, with timely assistance from Roland, and is pulled into Mid-World once again. This action resolves the paradoxes in the minds of both Jake and Roland, and their sanity is restored.

On the journey, Jake befriends a billy-bumbler who he calls Oy, who provides comfort for the boy on his quest. While crossing the desolate city of Lud, Jake is kidnapped by a deranged resident of the city. He allows himself to be taken in exchange for the rest of the group's safe passage, and Roland promises to come for Jake, despite having to abandon him temporarily. Despite the danger it poses, he rescues Jake with the help of Oy, reaffirming the father-son bond that has grown between them. Like Eddie and Susannah, Jake shows amazing aptitude to the way of a gunslinger.

Jake is the second member of the ka-tet to die, when he sacrifices himself to save Stephen King (as a character in the series) from certain death by putting himself between King and the van meant to take his life. By the end of the tale Jake has died a total of three times. An alternate version of Jake is encountered later by Susannah Dean; in this world, he and Eddie are brothers, with the last name Toren.

Roland also notes that Jake strongly resembles Alain, another gunslinger, in his stable, reserved personality and talent with a psychic skill referred to as "the touch." Alain is described mostly by his time with Roland as a teen in Wizard and Glass.

==== Oy ====
Oy is a "billy-bumbler," a strange creature found in Roland Deschain's world. King describes Oy in the "Argument", or foreword, of the fourth book, Wizard and Glass—"Bumblers, which look like a combination of badger, raccoon, and dog, have a limited speaking ability". Elsewhere, bumblers are described as "a combination raccoon and woodchuck, with a little dachshund thrown in." At one point, Eddie calls Oy "a fucked-up weasel". Oy's voice is described as "low and deep, almost a bark; the voice of an English footballer with a bad cold in his throat."

Regarding Oy's appearance, by far the most frequently described feature throughout the series is his large, "bright" almost glowing, "intelligent, gold-ringed eyes", though King also frequently refers to the creature's "disproportionately long," "surprisingly graceful neck". The creature has "black- and grey-striped fur" and a "furry corkscrew tail".

At the time of their meeting, Roland concedes that Oy may quite possibly be meant as another member of their ka-tet. This is confirmed in Wizard and Glass, when the ka-tet cannot enter "The Emerald City" until all of them—including Oy—are wearing ruby slippers. Later, in the 6th book, this is commemorated when the Tet Corporation forms as the association of "Deschain, Dean, Dean, Chambers, and Oy."

Oy develops emotions and even a sense of humanity beyond that of his ability to replicate some words that the others speak. Oy is often referred as the smartest bumbler that characters have seen since the world had moved on. Oy provides a much-needed shelter from the harsh nature of the quest for Jake, often playing with him or providing moments of lightheartedness to the ka-tet. His deep loyalty to his friend saves Jake's life several times, and he remains part of Roland's ka-tet even after the boy dies, as a final request from Jake.

Oy is killed in the last Dark Tower book. He saves Roland's life by attacking Mordred, who came to kill Roland in his sleep. Mordred snaps Oy's back and impales him on a tree limb while the bumbler is defending his friend, but Oy finds enough strength to lick Roland's hand one time before he dies. Stephen King hints that Oy will be found in the same universe that Susannah travels to and will be in some form of a dog with "odd, gold-ringed eyes and a bark that eerily resembles human speech."

=== Roland's original Ka-tet ===
==== Cuthbert Allgood ====
Cuthbert is Roland Deschain's childhood best friend, and a member of his original ka-tet. Roland and Cuthbert are described as having been playing together since they were toddlers. Cuthbert, often called Bert, is first featured in The Gunslinger, but he does not play a major role in the series until Wizard and Glass, the fourth volume in the series.

Cuthbert is characterized by his outwardly flippant, care-free view of the world. He constantly makes jokes, often testing the nerves of his companions. He is notably skilled with a sling-shot: it is said that he could 'take a bird on the wing at 50 yards' with it. This is a skill that comes in handy on many occasions in Mejis when the boys cannot openly carry their guns. Cuthbert is quick-witted and sometimes has a way with words—his proclivity for words can be noticed as he often stops to repeat and muse over phrases he finds to be nice and 'round'.

Physically, Cuthbert is described as being trim and tall with shoulder-length dark hair and dark eyes.During the battle of Jericho Hill, Cuthbert is shot through the eye by an arrow fired by Randall Flagg. In Song of Susannah, Eddie Dean is revealed to be a reincarnation, or at least a "twinner" of Cuthbert Allgood.

==== Alain Johns ====
Alain is one of Roland's original ka-tet, and along with the gunslinger and Cuthbert is evacuated to Mejis in Wizard and Glass for safety, due to the ongoing war against John Farson. Alain is strong in the 'touch', which is the mid-world term for a combination of telepathy, precognition, and hypersensitivity to the guiding hand of Ka.

Alain is described as being stout with blond hair. He is calm, reserved and often plays the role of level-headed mediator between ever pragmatic Roland and ostensibly care-free Cuthbert—particularly when Susan Delgado is seen to be interfering with Roland's decision making.

After Mejis, Alain joined Roland, Cuthbert, and Jamie on their quest for the Dark Tower.

Shortly before the battle of Jericho Hill, the last stand by the gunslingers of Gilead against Farson's men, Alain was accidentally killed by Roland and Cuthbert, who mistook him for an assassin in the night.

==== Jamie De Curry ====
Jamie De Curry was a member of Roland Deschain's original ka-tet. He grew up and trained with Roland under Cort and Vannay in Gilead. He was the first to discover Roland's plan to attempt to finish his training (by fighting Cort, their veteran teacher) at the unprecedented age of 14. He is characterized by a birthmark on his face, leading some in Gilead to refer to him as "Jamie of the marked face." He was killed by a sniper at the Battle of Jericho Hill while pushing Roland from the line of fire. It's stated by Roland that as a child he excelled in archery—the use of a bow and 'bah' (crossbow)—far more so than Roland himself, although by the time of the Battle of Jericho Hill he is a Gunslinger, like the rest of Roland's ka-tet.

Jamie figures prominently in the novel The Wind Through the Keyhole, traveling with Roland to investigate rumors of a shape-changing "skin-man" that is attacking a frontier town. In this novel, his birthmark is described as being a deep red one on his hand, making it appear as if it has been dipped in blood, and he has the nickname "Jamie Red-Hand."

==== Thomas Whitman ====
Not much is known about Thomas Whitman. He is only briefly mentioned in The Gunslinger as one of Roland Deschain's childhood friends who studied under Cort. He is shown in several installments of The Gunslinger comic series. He is shown to have a lean build with short, black hair. In the Battle of Jericho Hill, he and several other Gunslingers are killed by a flamethrower.

=== Allies of the Ka-tet ===
==== Susan Delgado ====
Susan Delgado appears in Wizard and Glass, the fourth book of The Dark Tower series. She is a resident of Hambry, in the Barony of Mejis, where the 14-year-old Roland and his ka-tet have been sent for their own safety. Susan's father was purportedly killed in a horseback riding accident, which Susan later learned was a murder premeditated by the town's leadership. Shortly before Roland's arrival, Susan has been cajoled by her aunt Cordelia into becoming a concubine, or "gilly", for Mejis' mayor, Hart Thorin. Although Susan is to be paid for her services, she is a recognized consort and any heir she bears to the heretofore-childless Thorin will be considered legitimate. Before consummating her relationship with Thorin, however, she falls in love with Roland and becomes involved in the young gunslinger's plans to prevent John Farson from using an oilfield near Hambry to supply his troops with crude oil. When Roland and his friends are framed for Thorin's murder and arrested, she breaks them out of jail and helps them escape Hambry. Before she can flee, however, she is captured, brought back to town, and publicly burned at the stake as an alleged accomplice in the murder. At the time, she is already pregnant with Roland's first child. Roland is devastated by her death—not just because of his love for her—but because, when confronted with the choice of returning for her or setting out for the Dark Tower and thus saving all of creation, he chose the Tower, thus condemning her to death.

Roland believes that Susan Delgado was the only true love of his life.

==== Ted Brautigan ====
Ted Stevens Brautigan was introduced in the Stephen King novella "Low Men in Yellow Coats" from Hearts in Atlantis. He is a powerful "Breaker", a psychic, whose extraordinary powers as a facilitator are sought by the Crimson King so he can hasten the destruction of the beams and Dark Tower. Ted arrives in the Devar-Toi, the prison camp where the Breakers are held, in 1955, and with help from Roland's old friend from Mejis, Sheemie Ruiz, soon escapes the Devar-Toi and enters the Connecticut of 1960, which is when the story of "Low Men in Yellow Coats" takes place. After his adventure in Connecticut, the low men capture and smuggle him back to the Devar-Toi via the Dixie Pig and Thunderclap Station. Ted meets Roland and his ka-tet in the final novel of the series, and he, Dinky Earnshaw, and the newly revealed psychic Sheemie assist the ka-tet in the attack on the Devar-Toi and ultimately succeed in obliterating the low men and the taheen. After Roland, Jake, and Oy travel to the Maine of 1999 to prevent Stephen King from dying, Ted and his friends escort Susannah Dean to Fedic Station, and Ted, along with a handful of the other Breakers depart for the Callas, where they hope to first find redemption from the Calla folken and then return to America via the Doorway Cave.

==== Sheemie Ruiz ====
Stanley "Sheemie" Ruiz, introduced in Wizard and Glass, was a mildly mentally handicapped tavern boy at a saloon in Hambry. Sheemie assisted Roland and his first ka-tet in preventing the followers of John Farson, and more specifically, the Crimson King, from reviving the Great Old Ones' war machines, later following the group back to Gilead. Sheemie joined Roland's ka-tet briefly and helped the gunslingers ward off the Crimson King's followers until he and his mule Capi mysteriously disappeared. However, while Roland assumes Sheemie is dead, he is not; he had been captured by the low men and taken to the Devar-Toi, the Breaker prison, because of his telepathic abilities, which remained unknown to Roland's ka-tet. He reappears in the series' final novel and assists the new ka-tet in defeating the low men and the taheen. However, during the battle, he steps on a piece of glass, causing an infection (accelerated by the "poison air" around Thunderclap). While escorting Susannah to Fedic on the train, he dies of blood poisoning. Although Susannah never learns this, she is indirectly responsible for his death, as it is her bullet that breaks the glass out of his window, causing it to be there for him to step on.

==== Dinky Earnshaw ====
Richard "Dinky" Earnshaw is the psychic assassin from Stephen King's short story "Everything's Eventual." He was hired by a man named Mr. Sharpton who was the head of a North Central Positronics subsidiary. However, when Dinky discovered what Sharpton was truly using him for, he killed Sharpton. Unfortunately, the low men captured him and transported him to the Devar-Toi, where he later met Ted Brautigan and Sheemie Ruiz. The three joined forces with Roland and his ka-tet in the final novel of the series and they helped to defeat the Devar-Toi's guards.

==== Pere Donald Callahan ====
Donald Frank Callahan is the "damned" priest who first appeared in the novel 'Salem's Lot. He makes his first appearance in the Dark Tower series in Wolves of the Calla, although his involvement in the series was hinted at in the afterword to Wizard and Glass. After being marked by the vampire Kurt Barlow, and therefore forced out of his church, Father Callahan spends time volunteering in a homeless shelter. Callahan made it a goal to get even with the vampires for what they did to him and his friend, who contracted HIV after being bitten by a vampire. He is aided in this by his ability to spot the vampires; since Jerusalem's Lot (and the forced ingestion of some of the vampire Barlow's blood) he has been able to recognize vampires on sight. Like Jake Chambers, Callahan enters Mid-World after dying in his own world, although in Callahan's case the death is his own doing; he jumps from a window to escape agents of the Crimson King, then arrives at the Way Station from The Gunslinger, shortly after Jake & Roland left it. He becomes a partial member of the ka-tet, assisting the ka-tet in the Battle against the Wolves and Susannah's rescue mission from 1999 New York, and sacrificing himself so that Jake may live in the final stand in The Dark Tower VII against the can-toi (low men) and vampires. For the second time, Callahan kills himself before allowing himself to fall at the hands of the vampires.

==== Patrick Danville ====
Patrick appears in Insomnia as a promising child artist, then again at the end of the Dark Tower series as a young adult artist with enough talent to shape the real world as he sees fit. As a young boy, he was prophesied to save two men in the future. He drew pictures of Roland and the roses as well. In the Dark Tower series, he was kept imprisoned for an unknown amount of time by the psychic vampire Dandelo and was rescued by Susannah and Roland. Patrick draws a door that allows Susannah to enter a parallel world, and later draws and erases a picture of the Crimson King, causing him to disappear from the Tower so that Roland can safely enter it. Roland then sends Patrick back the way they came, instructing him to either find or draw a door that will lead him to America, but his final fate is not revealed.

==== Aunt Talitha Unwin ====
"Aunt" Talitha Unwin was a resident of River Crossing, near the city of Lud. When Roland Deschain came to River Crossing, she was 105 years old. She and the people of River Crossing provided food and shelter for the ka-tet while they were on their way to Lud. Talitha gave her cross to Roland to lay at the base of the Dark Tower. Roland gave the cross to John Cullum, to use as a sigul in persuading Moses Carver to help start the Tet Corporation. Just before his death, Cullum gave the cross to Carver so he could return it to Roland.

When Roland came to the Dark Tower, he called Talitha's name among those of his friends and loved ones and laid her cross at its base as he had promised.

==== Cortland "Cort" Andrus ====
Teacher of Roland's original ka-tet. Roland earned his guns by defeating him with the hawk David, who was mortally wounded in that battle. After Roland's challenge, Cort laid in his cabin for a week in a coma, being tended by two nurses. Cort was often rough-handed with his students, using physical punishment and denial of food as discipline when they made mistakes. He also fancied calling the prospective gunslingers "maggots". According to Roland, he is murdered soon after Roland's class graduates. He acts as a sort of a spiritual guide to Roland throughout the series, his voice and teachings popping up in the Gunslinger's mind every so often as Roland needs to reflect upon his training.

In Wizard and Glass, it is revealed that Cort's father was the teacher of Eldred Jonas (see below), the leader of the Big Coffin Hunters. Jonas failed in his trial of manhood and was exiled, taking a blow from the elder Andrus' club that broke his leg and left him with a permanent limp.

==== Abel Vannay ====
Also known as "Vannay the Wise", he was the other primary tutor of Roland's ka-tet and of apprentice gunslingers. Known mostly for his wisdom and forbearance, Vannay's analytical method of instruction and pacifistic nature serve as strong counterpoints to the ruthless application of force and cynical thought process exercised by Cort. It is mentioned that he walks with the assistance of a black ironwood cane. His only known relative was his son Wallace, who played with Roland as a toddler; however, he died very young of an illness. Vannay would become one of the many victims to fall prey to the forces of John Farson in the battle for Gilead.

==== Stephen King ====
Stephen King (as a fictionalized character) appears in the final two Dark Tower books. Roland and his ka-tet learn of his existence when Roland comes across a copy of Salem's Lot, after first meeting Father Callahan in the fifth book Wolves of the Calla. Roland and Eddie later confront King in his Maine home at a time when he has written 'Salem's Lot and The Gunslinger but no further Dark Tower books. Roland hypnotizes King and it is revealed that the author did not in fact "create" the characters of Father Callahan, or Roland, nor any others involved with the Dark Tower, but Stephen King is in this reality a channel (another servant of the Beam / ka / Gan) that records their ongoing quest. It is also revealed that at a very young age, the Crimson King attempted to claim Stephen King as one of his own. King fears death and retaliation from the Crimson King if he continues to write Roland's tale but the Gunslinger's hypnosis encourages him to continue. The eventual attempt on King's life that would end his chronicling of Roland's quest comes in the form of his 1999 automobile incident.

Many elements of Stephen King's real life are presented through his character (such as his 1999 accident) but are further fictionalized; King notes in the afterword to The Dark Tower that he took particular liberties with the geography of Maine to obscure the real-life location of his home and preserve what privacy he still has. Although he does not appear as a character until Song of Susannah, he is alluded to as early as The Drawing of the Three, when Eddie recalls having seen The Shining in movie theaters.

==== Stuttering Bill ====
Stuttering Bill is a robot (full name William D-746541-M Maintenance Robot with many other functions) appearing in The Dark Tower. He plowed Tower Road all the way up to the edge of the white lands, where the snow ended and the roses began. He gave Roland, Susannah and Patrick a ride on his snowplow for many miles, taking them closer to the Dark Tower.

Stuttering Bill was also the nickname of William Denbrough, one of the central characters in King's novel It.

==== Calvin Tower ====
Calvin Tower owns the lease of the Manhattan Restaurant of the Mind bookstore in the series. He first appears in The Waste Lands, where he sells Jake two books which later prove vital to the Ka-tet's survival of their encounter with Blaine the Mono. He is of Dutch lineage and has changed his last name to Tower from Toren, which means "tower" in that language. In later volumes, it is revealed that Tower owns the lot containing the rose, and is being pressured by mobsters to sell the property to the Sombra Corporation. Eddie saves Tower from a beating and persuades him to sell the land to the Ka-tet in the guise of the "Tet Corporation". Tower is an extremely reluctant recruit to the Ka-tet's cause; his selfishness and single-minded obsession with acquiring rare books nearly derail the Ka-tet's efforts on several occasions. His eventual—and reluctant—decision to do the right thing comes largely thanks to the influence of his much more selfless, heroic friend, Aaron Deepneau. In the end, he sells the lot to Tet Corporation, and serves on the board for many years. With Deepneau, he saves Father Callahan from knife-wielding thugs in 1981. Tower dies of a heart attack in 1990; in his honor, a group of Tet Corporation employees adopts the name "The Calvins" and takes on the task of hunting through Stephen King's entire published works for any possible connections to Roland's quest.

==== Aaron Deepneau ====
Aaron Deepneau is Calvin Tower's best—and only—friend. He serves as Tower's conscience, and steadily leads his friend to the gunslinger's cause. He later becomes one of the Tet Corporation's three founders, and proves to be one of the rose's most ardent defenders. His grand-niece Nancy, a gunslinger in her own right, works for the Tet Corporation. Deepneau dies of cancer in 1992.

==== John Cullum ====
A resident of Stoneham, Maine, Cullum works as a caretaker and groundskeeper for properties in the area. He meets Roland and Eddie in 1977, when they get caught in an ambush by hitmen working for the Sombra Corporation. Cullum leads the pair to safety, ferries them to his home, and provides a vehicle for them to use. He also proves instrumental in creating the Tet Corporation, persuading Moses Carver to use the assets of Holmes Dental as its startup capital, and is named as one of its three founders. He works tirelessly to defend the rose until being shot and killed in 1989, by a mugger presumably working for Sombra or North Central Positronics.

==== Maturin ====
The Guardians of the Beams keep watch over either end of the six beams that support The Dark Tower. Of the twelve Guardians the ones that are mentioned are Turtle, Bear, Fish, Wolf, Elephant, Rat, Bat, Lion, Horse, and Eagle; Maturin, the Turtle (also a character in It), is considered the most powerful, or significant, of these. Throughout the series the reader repeatedly comes across a simple, nursery-rhyme style poem about Maturin:

See the TURTLE of enormous girth!
On his shell he holds the Earth,
His thought is slow but always kind;
He holds us all within his mind.

On his back the truth is carried,
And there are love and duty married.
He loves the earth and loves the sea,
And even loves a child like me.

An alternative verse replaces "On his back..." with:

On his back all vows are made;
He sees the truth but mayn't aid.

This alternative verse relates also to Maturin's role in It, where the children of the Loser's Club state that "the turtle couldn't help us".

Maturin guards the same beam as Shardik from the opposite end. Whereas Shardik runs amok in The Waste Lands, nearly killing Eddie before it can be destroyed, Maturin is a totally benevolent (and incredibly powerful) presence in the story, helping the ka-tet at several points along their journey.

In Song of Susannah and The Dark Tower, a small ivory scrimshaw sculpture of Maturin comes into the ka-tet's possession, and with it, Susannah/Mia hypnotizes a stranger, forcing him to get Susannah/Mia a hotel room. Susannah leaves the turtle where Jake will find it, enabling him (and, through his own martyrdom, Pere Callahan) to track Susannah and escape the low men, taheen, and vampires in the Dixie Pig. The sculpture essentially holds any human (or can-toi) totally enrapt and compliant upon seeing it in the hands of its wielder. The carving is said to have a question-mark shaped scratch on its shell.

Also in books VI and VII, multiple characters stumble upon a small park near #2 Hammarskjold Plaza containing a fountain beside a bronze sculpture of a turtle. The park—and the sculpture—actually exist, although King places the park across the street from #2 Hammarskjold Plaza: In fact, the turtle is in a larger park directly alongside the building, part of the Katharine Hepburn Memorial Garden. The sculpture is a nod to the neighborhood's centuries-old nickname, Turtle Bay.

Both Turtle Bay and Maturin the turtle appear in King's earlier novel It, serving much the same benevolent supernatural guardian role.

The name Maturin itself is a reference to Stephen Maturin, a naturalist from the Aubrey–Maturin series of novels who discovers a new species of tortoise.

==== Moses Carver ====
Odetta/Susannah's godfather and guardian, retired president of the Tet Corporation, and protector of the rose. When he finally appears in The Dark Tower, he is 100 years old, with a fiery, mischievous, and extremely likable character. He has little gold framed glasses, a bad case of rheumatism, and a stooped posture; upon seeing him, Roland estimates that if he could stand straight, the two would be the same height (roughly 6'3"). He is the last living founder of the corporation, and his daughter Marian serves as its president since his retirement in 1997.

==== Irene Tassenbaum ====
Irene is a middle-aged housewife from Staten Island, somewhat neglected by her wealthy husband, who meets Roland, Jake, and Oy in Stoneham, Maine of the Keystone World in the year 1999. She volunteers to drive the gunslinger's party to Lovell, where they narrowly manage to save Stephen King's life, with Jake sacrificing his own life in the process. Tassenbaum then drives Roland and Oy to New York (making love with Roland along the way), where the gunslinger and the bumbler meet with the board of Tet Corp. before returning to Mid-World. Irene promises Roland that she will plant a rose at Jake's grave.

==== Ben Slightman ====
Ben Slightman the Elder is the traitor in Calla Bryn Sturgis who cooperates with Andy and the Wolves. He sold the town out for a pair of spectacles and protection for his son, Ben Slightman Jr. His son was not safe from the Wolves because he had a twin that died as a child, but he still had the twin chemicals in his brain. Slightman Sr. could not bear to lose all of his children.

==== Benny Slightman ====
Ben Slightman the Younger ("Benny" for short) is a boy living in Calla Bryn Sturgis. He had a twin who died as a child, making him eligible for kidnap by the Wolves. Benny is older than Jake, but younger in experience. He and Jake become fast friends and spend many days together in the Calla, giving Jake a chance to enjoy childhood as he has not been able to do in New York. Benny is killed by an exploding "sneetch" grenade in the final battle of the ka-tet with the Wolves.

His significance in the story is highlighted when Eddie and Jake visit the Manhattan Restaurant of the Mind bookstore in 1977, where they discover a book in Calvin Tower's possession, written by Benjamin Slightman Jr. Originally titled The Hogan, this copy has a misprint that renders it as The Dogan. This term features prominently in both the remainder of Wolves of the Calla and Song of Susannah. Eddie and Jake further note that the name "Benjamin Slightman Jr." contains 19 letters, a common theme throughout the series indicating something of great significance.

==== Zalia Jaffords ====
Zalia (maiden name Hoonik) is one of the many Sisters of Oriza and the wife of Tian Jaffords. The two have five children together, two pairs of twins (Heddon and Hedda, Lyman and Lia) and one singleton (Aaron). She supports Tian's decision to fight the Wolves and later takes part in Roland's plan to confront them. Her twin brother Zalman was taken by the Wolves and returned in a "roont" (ruined) state.

==== Tian Jaffords ====
Tian Jaffords is the 33-year-old husband to Zalia Jaffords. Unlike the other small farmers in Calla Bryn Sturgis, Tian can read, write and work with numbers. He is also the one to call the men of the Calla to meet at the town gathering so they can save their children from the Wolves. While all the Calla Bryn Sturgis' inhabitants have resigned themselves to letting the Wolves take their children, Tian stands in opposition to the Wolves out of a desire to protect his family. He has a twin sister, Tia, who was taken by the Wolves and returned in a "roont" (ruined) state.

==== Margaret Eisenhart ====
Margaret lived in Calla Bryn Sturgis and was the wife of Vaughn Eisenhart. She was born as a member of the Redpath Clan of the Manni as the daughter of Henchick, and accepted exile from the group when she married outside it. She was one of the Sisters of Oriza who stood with Roland Deschain and his ka-tet against the Wolves and was decapitated during their attack. Vaughn disapproved of her plan to join the defense effort.

==== Henchick of the Redpath Clan ====
Henchick is the leader of the Manni of the Redpath Clan. He is about eighty years old and has three wives. He is the father of Margaret Eisenhart. He helps Roland Deschain and his ka-tet enter the Keystone World through the Unfound Door in Doorway Cave. His Twinner in the Keystone World is the Reverend Earl Harrigan.

== Antagonists ==
=== John Farson ===
Farson, a.k.a. the Good Man, was a former thief, murderer, and harrier in the lands west of Gilead in Roland's youth, later becoming a general of rebellious people from the lesser classes of Mid-World. Followers, at his command, occupied Downland Baronies such as the Barony of Cressia, and after allying with the blue-faced barbarians of Grissom, they finally overwhelmed Gilead and the gunslingers. After the fall of Gilead and Farson's triumph, Roland and his old ka-tet fought for nine years against the remainder of Farson's forces, eventually leading to the battle of Jericho Hill. Farson sends his Generals Grissom and Walter O´Dim with the last two thousand soldiers and mutants against Roland, who was the only survivor. Farson is tall and slim, he has short, straight, black hair, brown eyes and wears black armor. He wears a terrible fright mask around his men.

In Wizard and Glass, a then-teenage Roland and his ka-tet uncover and stop a plot by Farson to use crude oil from fields in the Barony of Mejis to fuel his rebellion. Farson has recruited most of the Barony's elite to his cause. Roland later reflects that his actions only delayed the eventual fall of Gilead.

=== Randall Flagg ===
The Man in Black, and a character with numerous aliases, including: the Walking Dude, Walter O'Dim, Marten Broadcloak, Richard Faninn, Rudin Filaro, Legion, Covenant Man, and his given name, Walter Padick, son of Sam the Miller. He appears in many books of Stephen King, most notably in The Eyes of the Dragon and in The Stand, always as a nearly demonic sorcerer. He is the Crimson King's chief agent. In the final novel, he is killed and eaten by Mordred Deschain.

=== The Crimson King ===
The ultimate in evil, this mysterious figure wishes to conquer the Dark Tower and raze it to the ground. Since this will destroy the entire multiverse, the Crimson King is naturally cast as the villain in The Dark Tower books. He is also known as Ram Aballah, and once ruled from his castle in End-World, but now is imprisoned on a balcony on the Dark Tower, to which he ran while in a fit of madness. He believes that when the Tower falls, he will rule the Todash darkness that was once the multiverse. He is the one whom Walter/Flagg serves, whom the low men and taheen serve, and he has opposed Roland of Gilead from the beginning. The Crimson King is known by a number of names, including Los' the Red, Ram Aballah, The Aballah, The Kingfish, The Red King, The Lord of Spiders, and The Lord of Discordia. He also appears in Insomnia as a higher being trying to murder Patrick Danville as a child.

The Crimson King is also named in the Stephen King/Peter Straub novel Black House, the sequel to The Talisman.

=== Jack Mort ===
Jack Mort (whose name means "Death" in French) is a fictional character who makes a brief appearance in The Gunslinger, and a more detailed appearance in The Drawing of the Three. The third door that Roland encounters on the beach leads to Mort and New York in the mid-1970s. Roland finds himself inside the mind of "The Pusher", a sociopath named Jack Mort, whose sadistic acts of random violence have shaped the lives of Roland's companions. Mort, an accountant, thrives on being a meticulous planner when it comes to murder. This, and his style of execution, leads him to be an anonymous and therefore very effective killer. For example, Mort will drop bricks (and presumably other heavy items) on people's heads from tall places (what he calls "depth charging"), will push people in front of cars, and will also push people in front of subway trains. His methods allow a complete lack of direct confrontation, and thus allow him to continue his secret life quietly and with deadly effectiveness. He acts as a linking point between Susannah (both Odetta and Detta), Jake, and ultimately Roland. When Odetta was five, Mort dropped a brick on her head (which led to the emergence of her multiple personalities); he also pushed Odetta in front of a subway car when she was a teenager (neither knowing nor caring that she was a previous victim of his cruelty). On the day Roland enters him, he is planning to shove a young boy (who turns out to be Jake Chambers) into traffic. Unwilling to let Jake die once again through his inaction, Roland takes control of Mort's body and stops him. This death was the means that forced Jake into Roland's world the first time; when Roland prevented it, it had caused a time paradox, though it was resolved later, or rather, undermined, when Jake entered into Roland's world again, but through a door. Later, Roland purposefully forces Jack Mort to throw himself burning in front of a subway train, while telling him that he deserves a far worse fate. In the midst of this struggle, Roland manages to trick Detta into looking through the door, which forces both Odetta and Detta to acknowledge their dual personalities and the cause of them. Mort is described as tall, thin, and having blonde hair in The Drawing of the Three, yet is said by Roland to have had dark hair when mentioned in The Waste Lands.

=== Blaine the Mono ===
Blaine the Mono is a demented monorail train appearing in The Waste Lands and Wizard and Glass. Originally serving as public transit in the city of Lud with his fellow monorail Patricia, another train with feminine characteristics, he slowly went insane after the world went into decline and the despondent female monorail committed suicide. Roland and his ka-tet have to ride this psychopathic train in order to travel safely from Lud to Topeka so they can continue their journey toward the Dark Tower. The train seems to be connected to the children's book found by Jake, Charlie the Choo-Choo. Before Blaine lets Roland and his ka-tet on board, he kills every single living thing in the city of Lud with poison gas.

Blaine reveals to the ka-tet that he plans to derail in Topeka, destroying himself and killing them, but accepts Roland's challenge to a riddle contest for a chance at the survival of the ka-tet. If Blaine cannot answer every riddle put to him by the ka-tet, he will let them depart safely once they reach Topeka. It becomes clear that Blaine has a huge library of riddles from many different levels of the tower at his disposal, and programs to decipher plays on words or hidden clues, so the game seems doomed. Eddie eventually stumps Blaine with unsolvable "riddles" that are actually stupid jokes from his childhood. This forces Blaine to try to "lower" his intelligence to levels necessary to answer, which ends up driving him completely insane and causes his computer to crash. Eddie then proceeds to shoot the computer, knocking out power to the engines. Blaine coasts into Topeka and crashes into the end-of-line barricades; the ka-tet suffer minor injuries and barely escape a much worse fate due to the train's loss of momentum while coasting in.

=== Shardik ===
Shardik is a character encountered by Roland and his ka-tet in the novel The Waste Lands.

Shardik, while appearing to be a massive bear, is actually a mechanical construct of North Central Positronics. A cyborg, Shardik was built by North Central Positronics to serve as one of the twelve Guardians of the Beams. At the time that he is encountered by Roland, he is several thousand years old, malfunctioning, slowly dying, and infested with parasites (a reference to Richard Adams's novel Shardik). Driven insane by his illness, he attacks Roland and his ka-tet, and they are forced to kill him.

Each Guardian keeps watch over one end of one of the six Beams that support the Dark Tower. Of the twelve Guardians the ones that are mentioned are Turtle, Bear, Fish, Wolf, Elephant, Rat, Bat, Lion, Horse, and Eagle; Maturin, the Turtle (also a character in It), is considered the most powerful, or significant, of these. By the time Roland was growing up, the Guardians had reached a near-mythic status, and he was unsure of their existence before encountering Shardik.

The original Guardians, like so many other elements of Roland's world, may have been magic entities that were replaced by North Central Positronics' technological constructs. The death of Shardik represents another failure of technology and is one more step in the dismantling of not only Roland's world, but the entire multiverse of existence.

Shardik is also a novel by Richard Adams; King took the name from this book, something some members of Roland's ka-tet recognize: Susannah realizes the source of the name (although the book was published a decade after the year she was drawn from), while Eddie mentions that he thinks of rabbits when he hears the name Shardik—a reference to Watership Down, another of Adams' books. Adams' Shardik, like King's, is a giant bear.

=== Rhea ===
A decrepit old witch, Rhea Dubativo, also known as Rhea of the Cöos, was the one responsible for the death of Roland's true love, Susan Delgado. She also tricked Roland into killing his own mother, after she made Gabrielle Deschain's reflection in the mirror appear to be hers. Rhea owned a 6 legged mutant cat called Musty and a venomous snake called Ermot. She was entrusted with the pink Wizard's Glass (known as Merlin's Grapefruit), which slowly drained her and drove her insane, similar to the deterioration of Smeagol/Gollum from The Lord of the Rings. Readers never find out what happens to her; although Roland implies that he killed her, nothing more is elaborated upon beyond that. She is seen in Wizard and Glass; however, is mentioned in The Gunslinger prior to her appearance in the series.

=== Eldred Jonas ===
The main antagonist of Wizard and Glass, Eldred is a failed gunslinger now in service to the Crimson King. He leads a gang called the Big Coffin Hunters. Eldred, though in charge of the Red's operations in Mejis, is answerable to George Latigo (one of John Farson's chief lieutenants) and Randall Flagg (at this time known as Walter), Farson's personal wizard. Briefly mentioned by Sheb in The Gunslinger.

=== Roy Depape ===
Arguably the shortest-tempered of the Big Coffin Hunters, Roy Depape's hot-headedness is one of the major catalysts for events in Wizard and Glass; through threatening Sheemie Ruiz following a mishap in the local tavern, Roy sets off a multi-layered Mexican standoff between Roland's original ka-tet and the Big Coffin Hunters. Though the situation is initially resolved with diplomacy, the event reveals to Jonas the true nature of Roland and his friends (who were hiding incognito in Mejis under aliases) and blows their cover. When the Big Coffin Hunters enact their plan to frame the ka-tet for murder, he kills Mayor Hart Thorin and plants a rook's skull at the scene, an item Cuthbert often showed off before losing it. He is killed by Roland when the ka-tet attack Jonas and his detachment of men on their way to meet George Latigo.

=== Clay Reynolds ===
Clay Reynolds is Eldred Jonas' right-hand man and the quietest of the Big Coffin Hunters. He is described as red-haired and especially handsome, and has a reputation as a ladies' man. His most notable accessory (besides his pistol) is a long red cloak. When the Hunters are framing Roland and his friends he volunteers to kill Kimba Rimer with a long dagger he bought for the occasion, in revenge for a comment Rimer made about his cloak. During the ensuing confusion that transpires near the end of Wizard and Glass, Clay escapes from Mejis with Coral Thorin, and the two become a bandit couple. King first cites Reynolds as having red hair, then changes it to dark (brown/black), then references Depape as being "be-spectacled and red-haired" several times. Roland mentions that both Reynolds and Coral Thorin were killed in a failed robbery several years after the events of Mejis. In the comic series The Dark Tower: The Long Road Home, Reynolds is seen leading a posse of Mejis citizens in pursuit of Roland's Ka-tet, which they break off when Cuthbert Allgood cuts a rope bridge over a wild river. In the one shot issue The Dark Tower: The Sorcerer, Reynolds is seen being whipped by John Farson for losing Maerlyn's Grapefruit while Coral Thorin waits outside Farson's tent.

=== Coral Thorin ===
Coral is the traitorous sister of Mejis' mayor, Hart Thorin. Mature and slender, she catches the eye of both Eldred Jonas and Clay Reynolds. Crafty and intelligent, Coral is able to ascertain that Jonas is indeed working for John Farson and, not wanting to be on the losing side, conspires with and aids Jonas in his dealing in Mejis. The two enter into a sexual relationship, but following Jonas' death Coral becomes the lover and cohort of Clay Reynolds.

=== Cordelia Delgado ===
Cordelia Delgado was Susan Delgado's mentally unstable aunt, who sold her to Mayor Thorin as a "gilly". She has no problem selling Susan for money. Cordelia has a short temper and has fits where she becomes enraged and screams at Susan. When Cordelia learns that Susan has lost her virginity to Roland and not Hart Thorin, she becomes enraged and slowly loses her mind. Towards the end of the book, she has gone completely insane and joins Rhea in killing Susan. Cordelia is the first person to light the pyre that sets Susan on fire; Rhea is second. Shortly after killing Susan Delgado, Cordelia has a stroke and dies.

=== Mia ===
An invading spirit who possesses Susannah Dean's body in Wolves of the Calla. Originally an immortal spirit similar to a succubus, she saw and fell in love with a baby and longed to have one of her own (an unknown force kept her from coming too close to the child she loved and taking it for herself). Long after a plague ravaged the town of Fedic and the child was taken away, Mia struck a bargain with Walter/Flagg. If she would give up her formless immortality, Walter would give her a baby. Mia's purpose in Walter's and the Crimson King's plan is to bear Roland's child; prophecy has foretold that this child will be Roland's doom.

Mia called the child her "chap", and it was carried by both Susannah and Mia. Susannah had become pregnant with Roland's seed from the demon she copulated with in The Waste Lands, during Jake's Drawing. The demon, a hermaphrodite able to change its sex, had copulated previously with Roland as a female in The Gunslinger while Roland protected Jake and queried it for information. The demon had somehow preserved Roland's semen (and allowed it to be somehow mixed with that of the Crimson King's seed) and impregnated Susannah with it while male. Mia possessed Susannah in order to take over the birthing of her "chap".

Mia is killed and eaten by her child, Mordred, shortly after giving birth.

=== Mordred Deschain ===
Son of two fathers and two mothers, Mordred was born of Susannah's egg fertilized by the seed of both Roland of Gilead and the Crimson King, and carried to term by Mia. Mordred is half-human, half-spider, able to transform between the two, and if his fate is fulfilled, he will both kill Roland and topple the Dark Tower itself. He is both very powerful and extremely arrogant. Growing at a rapid speed, Mordred passes from childhood through adolescence in a matter of months. His abilities include the ability to change between human form and spider form at will and absorbing a victim's knowledge and experience by devouring them. Mordred becomes deathly ill after eating poisoned horse meat, and when he makes a final attempt to kill Roland, he is attacked by Oy. Oy is able to distract Mordred long enough to allow Roland to wake up and kill his son at the threshold of the Dark Tower.

=== Richard Patrick Sayre ===
Richard Patrick Sayre is a high-ranking can-toi and a member of the Sombra Corporation. Like the other members of his race, he dresses in garishly colored clothing and has a raw spot on his forehead that continually wells up with blood without scabbing or spilling down his face.

As revealed in Wolves of the Calla, Sayre lured Father Callahan to Sombra's offices by offering a million dollars to the charity he was working for. It was a trap, where Sayre intended to use Type Three vampires to give Callahan AIDS. His plan failed when Callahan committed suicide by jumping out the window.

In Song of Susannah and The Dark Tower, Sayre is the man in charge of delivering Mia's baby. He calls Susannah/Mia in their hotel room, telling them to go to the Dixie Pig. He takes them through the door into Fedic, where Mia is placed on a bed to deliver Mordred Deschain. After his birth, Susannah grabs a gun and shoots Sayre in the head.

In the film adaptation of The Dark Tower from 2017, Sayre is played by Jackie Earl Haley.

=== Finli O'Tego ===
Finli O'Tego is a weasel-headed Taheen who appears in the fifth and seventh Dark Tower books. His voice is heard over a communications system in Wolves of the Calla, when Ben Slightman the Elder is making a report, and he appears in person during The Dark Tower.

Finli is a close friend to Pimli Prentiss and serves as the security chief of Devar-Toi. Like most Taheen, he has psychic abilities; he also enjoys eating pus, offered by Prentiss as he breaks the pimples that erupt on his face. He is credited with orchestrating the re-capture of Ted Brautigan, an event described in Hearts in Atlantis. During the siege of Algul Siento by Roland's ka-tet, Finli is mortally injured and ultimately put out of his misery by Eddie Dean.

=== Enrico Balazar ===
Enrico Balazar is a New York Mafia boss first introduced in The Drawing of the Three. Despite being of Sicilian descent, Balazar lacks any Italian complexion and speaks with no accent. He manages a club called "The Leaning Tower" and has a fascination with building houses of cards on his desk, even murdering a man for knocking them down during an argument. He also owns a pizza parlor to use for money laundering. Among his actions in the series are: kidnapping Eddie Dean's older brother, Henry (who in turn overdoses on heroin before he can be saved), running over Jake with his car and killing him for the first time, and hiring out his musclemen to the Sombra Corporation. Balazar is killed by Eddie and Roland in Dark Tower II, but then appears again in books VI and VII in a New York of the previous decade. While not physically appearing in either novels, he is mentioned as being contracted by the Sombra Corporation to force Calvin Tower to sell his plot of land, which is connected to the Tower.

=== Jack Andolini ===
Jack Andolini is a New York gangster and member of Enrico Balazar's crew, whom readers first met in The Drawing of the Three. In that novel, he followed Eddie and Roland from Earth to Mid-World (via magic door) and was promptly eaten alive by lobstrosities (after suffering major wounds to his face and arm during gunplay with Roland). He reappears, first in Wolves of the Calla and later in Song of Susannah as a representative of the Sombra Corporation, in a parallel-earth, 1977. When Roland and Eddie enter the Maine of 1977, Andolini and his gang ambush them at the East Stoneham General Store. This version of Andolini meets a less horrible fate: he is imprisoned in a Maine county jail.

=== Dandelo ===
Dandelo is a psychic vampire who feeds on emotions. He makes an appearance in the final book in the series, The Dark Tower. Using the name of 'Joe Collins', he lures Roland and Susannah into his cottage on Odd Lane (the street that crosses Tower Road in the White Lands of Empathica, and an anagram of "Dandelo") and treats them to a feast. Afterward, he tells them that before entering All-World, he was a stand-up comedian. Roland asks to hear some of his act, during which Dandelo comes close to making Roland laugh to death. Susannah avoids entrapment because she is in the bathroom at the time, tending to a troublesome sore on her face. There she discovers a note apparently left by Stephen King himself (the note even acknowledges itself as a deus ex machina) that helps her puzzle out Joe's true identity. Before he can sap all of Roland's life force, Dandelo is killed by Susannah with two shots to the head.

It is later revealed that he had kept Patrick Danville captive as a 'food source' to drain of emotions; at one point Dandelo ripped out Danville's tongue, preventing him from speaking.

=== Lippy ===
Dandelo had a stable behind his house, in which he kept a blind horse named Lippy. Lippy whinnied when she sensed Roland, Susannah and Oy approach. She was very old, ragged, and had holes in her coat. When Dandelo is slain by the gunslingers, Lippy flees her stable, but returns to seek shelter from a winter storm—only to be shot down by Roland. After the gunslingers have moved on, Mordred Deschain, starving after weathering the storm out in the wilderness, fed on Lippy's corpse, which poisoned him and eventually contributed to his downfall.

=== Tick-Tock Man ===
The Tick-Tock Man (real name Andrew Quick) is the leader of the Grays of Lud. He first appears in The Waste Lands.

He is the great-grandson of David Quick, an outlaw who attacked Lud with the aid of forces that would come to be known as the first Grays. After he has Jake brought to his underground stronghold by his henchman Gasher, Roland and Oy mount a rescue effort. During a fight with them, Oy punctures Andrew's left eye and Jake shoots him in the leg and head. The latter wound only grazes his skull and tears a flap of skin from his head; he survives and is subsequently found by Randall Flagg. In Wizard and Glass, Roland and his ka-tet find Andrew in the Emerald Palace; he attacks them but is shot dead by Eddie and Susannah. He seems to be a successor to the Trashcan Man from The Stand, as both were followers of Flagg who repeated the mantra "My life for you" in regard to their loyalty to him.

=== Andy the Messenger Robot (Many Other Functions) ===
Andy was one of the main antagonists in Wolves of the Calla. Andy, who is described as reminiscent of C3PO from the Star Wars series, was created by Lamerk Industries (the same company that made the Twelve Guardians) and had lived in the Calla for thousands of years. He was obsessed with telling people their horoscopes, like Blaine the Mono was obsessed with riddles. Andy played music from a speaker in his chest and was loved by all the children in the Calla. He used this closeness with children to gather information on the whereabouts of the children of the Calla, which he then reported to Finli O'Tego. The information was used so that the Wolves, who were really robots disguised as monsters, could locate the children and take them into Thunderclap. Andy's sinister nature was uncovered by Jake Chambers, who hid in an ancient control center and overheard Andy talking to Ben Slightman Sr. about the Wolves. Andy claimed not to know much about the Wolves (under Directive Nineteen), but he always told the townsfolk when they were coming a month in advance. Andy was finally put to rest by Eddie, who blinded him by shooting his eyes out and then ordering him to shut down under Directive Nineteen. Andy was buried underneath a pile of manure in an outhouse.

=== Pimli Prentiss ===
Pimli Prentiss is the warden of Algul Siento, a prison in which talented psychics known as Breakers are confined and put to work weakening the Beams that support the Dark Tower. He was born Paul Prentiss, on a parallel Earth very similar to the one originally inhabited by Eddie, Susannah, and Jake, and had worked as a prison guard. He got the warden's position by responding to a help-wanted newspaper advertisement, not knowing at the time that he would be serving the Crimson King. During his induction ceremony, he took the taheen name Pimli.

He is tall, overweight, and balding, and sometimes carries a Colt Peacemaker revolver in a shoulder holster. He displays caution and restraint in his service to the Crimson King, relying on his humanity and spirituality to guide him in managing the prison. He is portrayed as being a newly devout Catholic, often praying in his bathroom – a devotion apparently triggered by his experiences in Roland's world.

During the ka-tet's raid on Algul Siento, Pimli is shot and mortally wounded by Roland. However, he lives long enough to shoot Eddie Dean in the head, causing the ka-tet to break when the latter dies several hours later.

== Neutral ==
=== Gan ===
The being Gan is first mentioned by name in Song of Susannah, the sixth installment in the series. He is described as speaking "through the voices of the can-calah, who men call angels," and as "denying the Crimson King and denying Discordia itself." Gan's role in the novels is very much in line with the concept of God. In the cosmology of Stephen King's multiverse, Gan is referred to as "The White" in High Speech. Gan rose from the Prim (implied as being the darkness behind everything) and created the universes and infinite alternate universes that the Dark Tower (a building that serves as a microcosm of all of the multiple realities of the Dark Tower series) holds in place.

== Minor characters ==
=== Alice ===
A barmaid in Tull seen in The Gunslinger. She befriended Roland and told him about the story of Nort. Roland knew she would eventually ask Nort about the number Nineteen and knew this was a trap set up by The Man in Black. After she had asked Nort about the number Nineteen, Roland shot her in the head as she wished, as she could not bear what she was told. She was briefly recognised by Jake in The Waste Lands in New York.

=== Hart Thorin ===
Mayor of Mejis first seen in Wizard and Glass, brother of Coral Thorin and husband of Olive Thorin. Murdered by Roy Depape. Described as being tall and skinny.

=== James Farson ===
Farson's nephew is a young, slim musician. He has short, straight, black hair and dark eyes. He is a high-ranking soldier or henchman of Farson's Revolutionary Army, and one who met Gabrielle Deschain in their plans for the murder of Steven Deschain. He is always seen near his uncle, not directly in battle.

=== Nort ===
Appeared in The Gunslinger. Nort dies twice: once prior to Roland's stay in Tull, and once later at Roland's hand. Alice retells the story of Nort's first death—and subsequent resurrection—to Roland. Nort dies in Sheb's bar. He is described as a drunk and a user of devil-grass—one who has graduated from smoking it to chewing it, to Roland's shock and disgust. On the afternoon that he dies, The Man in Black appears and revives him in front of the regulars in the bar. He then hands Alice a note which states that if she speaks the code word "nineteen" to Nort, he will tell her of the secrets beyond Death. The note is intended as a trap; Alice eventually falls prey to it and says the word, triggering a town-wide frenzy against Roland in which he kills the entire population. Nort is last seen hanging above Sheb's bar, spread-eagled and crucified with wooden pegs, with a large and purple cloven hoof on his forehead. It is unclear who committed this crime, but it is likely the work of either Sylvia Pittston—who had referenced the cloven hoof in her sermon—or one of her followers, over whom she had a high degree of control.

=== Olive Thorin ===
Wife of Hart Thorin first seen in Wizard and Glass. Despite being pushed aside by her husband in favour of Susan Delgado, she was kind to Susan and tried to help her escape Mejis. Out of the original meeting between the townspeople and Roland, Cuthbert and Alain, she was the only one who Roland liked. Helped Susan escape from Mejis; however, was killed by Clay Reynolds before Susan was returned by Rhea for the reaping.

=== Sheb ===
Sheb was a piano player first seen in The Gunslinger. He was in Mejis at some point of his life before ending up in Tull. He originally did not recognise Roland until Roland prompts him by mentioning Susan Delgado. He is killed by Roland. He is seen again in Wizard and Glass, playing piano at the Travellers' Rest bar in the Mejis village of Hambry.

=== Sylvia Pittston ===
A preacher seen in The Gunslinger and preaches to the town of Tull about "The Interloper" and how the town should cast him down. She implies this to be Roland. She is killed by Roland. Coral Thorin briefly mentions Sylvia Pittston in Wizard and Glass about how she passed through the town a year prior to events of the story.

=== Tim Ross ===
Appears in The Dark Tower: The Wind Through the Keyhole as part of Roland's story to Bill. Tim Ross lives with his mother Nell in a forgotten village that fears the annual collection of property taxes by a man named The Covenant Man. Tim recently lost his father, who was said to have been killed by a dragon while in the woods chopping trees. After the death of his father, Nell, no longer able to pay the taxes to keep their home, marries his father's best friend and business partner Bern Kells, who moves in with them. Kells is a mean man, prone to heavy drinking, who begins to abuse both Tim and Nell. One day The Covenant Man comes to collect the taxes, and he secretly tells Tim to meet him later in the woods. During this meeting, The Covenant Man reveals to Tim that it was actually Kells who killed his father, not a dragon, and with help of a scrying bowl shows Kells beating his mother, causing her to go blind. Later, The Covenant Man sends Tim a vision telling him that if Tim again visits The Covenant Man in the woods, he will give Tim magic that will allow his mother to see again. Tim, armed with a gun given to him by his school teacher, journeys into the dangerous woods, and is led into a swamp by the mischievous fairy, Armaneeta. Here, Tim almost becomes victim to a dragon and other mysterious swamp creatures, but he is saved by his gun as well as a group of friendly swamp people, who mistake him for a gunslinger. The swamp people guide him to the far side of the swamp, and equip him with a small mechanical talking device from the 'Old People' that helps guide him on his journey. Eventually, Tim arrives at a Dogan where he finds a caged 'tyger' and befriends the tyger. The next morning, Tim discovers that the tyger is actually Maerlyn, a white magician, who had been trapped in the cage for years due to black magic. Maerlyn gives Tim a potion to cure his mother's blindness and sends him back to his mother on the flying magic blanket. Returning home, Tim brings sight back to his mother. Tim is attacked by Kells, who had secretly entered the home as Tim tended to his mother, but the boy is saved by his mother, who kills Kells with her late husband's ax.

Later in life, Tim becomes a gunslinger in his own right, known first as Lefty Ross and then as Tim Stoutheart.

=== Tyger ===
A Tyger seen in The Dark Tower: The Wind Through the Keyhole as part of Roland's story to Bill and implied to be Aslan, the guardian of the Beam of the Cat. Tim Ross arrives at a Dogan where he finds Tyger, which wears the key to the Dogan around its neck. A starkblast approaches, and Tim, realizing this is likely a trap set for him by The Covenant Man (also known as Randall Flagg and the Man in Black) befriends the tyger. Tim and the tyger ride out the storm under a magical protective blanket. The next morning, Tim discovers that the tyger is actually Maerlyn, a white magician, who had been trapped in the cage for years due to black magic. Maerlyn gives Tim a potion to cure his mother's blindness and sends him back to his mother on the flying magic blanket.

== Other ==
=== North Central Positronics ===
North Central Positronics appears in multiple works of Stephen King, in the Dark Tower series and related works. It is a huge corporation which manufactures technologically advanced items such as robots, computers, and weapons. Many of the products are prominent in the Dark Tower series, where the few remaining North Central Positronics products still functioning have gone insane, preying upon life and the remnants of civilization, or otherwise in various stages of deterioration. This is related to the phenomenon affecting much of reality; everything is falling apart. As stated in the books, the world has "moved on".

By the time it is encountered by Roland and his ka-tet, North Central Positronics is part of the Sombra Group, owned by the Crimson King, the personification of evil in the world of the Dark Tower. LaMerk Industries and LaMerk Foundry are two other entities which appear to be subsidiaries of the Sombra Group. The Crimson King's stated goal is the destruction of the multiverse/all reality.

Among NCP's creations in the books are dipolar computers, a number of androids and cyborgs (namely the Guardians of the beams, including Shardik the Bear and Maturin the Turtle), Nigel the housekeeping robot at Fedic, Stuttering Bill (one of the few robots the Ka-Tet encounter that is not hostile and actually aids them in their quest), Andy the Messenger Robot (Many Other Functions), and Blaine the Mono, a highly intelligent and sadistic monorail system that enjoys riddles. In "The Waste Lands," Jake and Gasher, and later Roland, enter the underworld of the city of Lud via an iron manhole which is protected by a cover stamped with the label "LaMerk Foundry."

In The Dark Tower: End-World Almanac published by Marvel Comics, one of North Central Positronics' major products is said to be the "Asimov-class robot".

== Overview ==
List indicators
- A dark grey cell indicates that the character was not in the property or that the character's presence in the property has yet to be announced.
- A Main indicates a character had a starring role in the property.
- A Minor indicates the character appeared in two or more times within the property.
- A Mentioned indicates the character was mentioned in the property.

Character	First Appearance	The Dark Tower book series								2017 Film
Character	First Appearance	The Gunslinger	II: The Drawing of the Three	III: The Waste Lands	IV: Wizard and Glass	The Wind Through the Keyhole	V: Wolves of the Calla	VI: Song of Susannah	VII: The Dark Tower	2017 Film
Character	First Appearance	1982	1987	1991	1997	2012	2003	2004		2017
Ka-tet of the Nineteen and/or Ninety and Nine
Roland Deschain The Gunslinger	The Dark Tower: The Gunslinger	Main	Main	Main	Main	Main	Main	Main	Main	Main
Jake Chambers	The Dark Tower: The Gunslinger	Main	Mentioned	Main	Minor		Main	Main	Main	Main
Edward Cantor "Eddie" Dean	The Dark Tower II: The Drawing of the Three		Main	Main	Minor	Minor	Main	Main	Main	
Susannah Dean Detta Walker Susannah-Mia	The Dark Tower II: The Drawing of the Three		Main	Main	Minor	Minor	Main	Main	Main	
Oy	The Dark Tower III: The Waste Lands			Minor	Minor	Minor	Main	Main	Main	
Pere Donald Frank Callahan	'Salem's Lot The Dark Tower V: Wolves of the Calla						Main	Main	Main	
Roland's original Ka-tet
Cuthbert Allgood	The Dark Tower: The Gunslinger	Minor	Mentioned		Main					
Alain Johns	The Dark Tower: The Gunslinger	Minor	Mentioned	Mentioned	Main					
Thomas Whitman	The Dark Tower: The Gunslinger	Mentioned								
Jamie De Curry	The Dark Tower: The Wind Through the Keyhole					Main				
Allies of the Ka-tet
Maturin The Turtle	It The Dark Tower III: The Waste Lands			Main				Mentioned	Mentioned	
Susan Delgado	The Dark Tower IV: Wizard and Glass	Mentioned	Mentioned	Mentioned	Main		Mentioned	Mentioned	Mentioned	Minor
Stanley "Sheemie" Ruiz	The Dark Tower IV: Wizard and Glass				Main				Main	
Stephen King	The Dark Tower VI: Song of Susannah		Mentioned				Mentioned	Main	Minor	
Ted Brautigan	Hearts in Atlantis: Low Men in Yellow Coats The Dark Tower VII: The Dark Tower								Main	
Richard "Dinky" Earnshaw	Everything's Eventual The Dark Tower VII: The Dark Tower								Main	
Patrick Danville	Insomnia The Dark Tower VII: The Dark Tower								Main	
Cortland "Cort" Andrus	The Dark Tower: The Gunslinger	Minor							Mentioned	
Calvin Tower	The Dark Tower III: The Waste Lands			Minor			Minor	Minor	Mentioned	
Aaron Deepneau	The Dark Tower III: The Waste Lands			Minor			Minor	Minor	Mentioned	
"Aunt" Talitha Unwin	The Dark Tower III: The Waste Lands			Minor				Mentioned	Mentioned	
John Cullum	The Dark Tower VI: Song of Susannah							Minor	Minor	
Moses Carver	The Dark Tower VII: The Dark Tower							Mentioned	Minor	
Stuttering Bill William D-746541-M Maintenance Robot	The Dark Tower VII: The Dark Tower								Minor	
Irene Tassenbaum	The Dark Tower VII: The Dark Tower								Minor	
Abel Vannay	The Dark Tower VII: The Dark Tower								Mentioned	
Antagonists
Walter Padick The Man In Black Walter O' Dim Randall Flagg Rudin Filario The Walkin' Dude The Hardcase The Dark Man The Covenant Man Marten Broadcloak	The Stand The Dark Tower: The Gunslinger	Main	Mentioned	Minor	Main	Main	Minor	Minor	Minor	Main
Richard Patrick Sayre	The Dark Tower V: Wolves of the Calla						Main	Main	Main	Main
The Crimson King	Insomnia The Dark Tower VII: The Dark Tower							Mentioned	Main	Mentioned
Neutral
Gan	The Dark Tower VII: The Dark Tower					Mentioned		Mentioned	Main	
