= Roland Deschain =

Fictional character and the protagonist of Stephen King's The Dark Tower series

- The Dark Tower character
- Roland Deschain as illustrated by Michael Whelan
- First appearance: "The Gunslinger" (1978)
- Last appearance: The Dark Tower (2017)
- Created by: Stephen King
- Portrayed by: Idris Elba (2017); Sam Strike (2019 pilot)

In-universe information
- Nickname: The Gunslinger
- Species: Human
- Gender: Male
- Occupation: Gunslinger
- Family: Steven Deschain (father); Gabrielle Deschain (mother)
- Children: Mordred Deschain (son)
- Relatives: Arthur Eld (30th-generation grandfather); Crimson King (29th-generation half-uncle)
- Nationality: New Canaan

Roland Deschain of Gilead is a fictional character and the protagonist of Stephen King's The Dark Tower series. He is the son of Steven and Gabrielle Deschain and is descended from a long line of "gunslingers", peacekeepers and diplomats of Roland's society.

== Fictional biography ==
=== Background ===
Roland becomes a gunslinger at the unheard-of age of 14 after being manipulated into taking the "trial of manhood" by Marten Broadcloak, his father's adviser and alias of Randall Flagg. Marten has an affair with Roland's mother and makes sure Roland finds out about it, prompting Roland to request his trial in order to gain his guns and exact revenge on Marten. In the trial, Roland must defeat his teacher, Cort, using a weapon of his choosing. He chooses a hawk named David and defeats Cort. Roland sacrifices David to win the fight, setting the tone for Roland's future choices in life. Despite Roland's victory, Cort and Roland's father convince Roland to bide his time before seeking retribution.

Not long after, Roland's father sends him on a mission to the town of Hambry in the Outer Barony of Mejis with his friends Alain Johns and Cuthbert Allgood, who will form the basis of his first ka-tet. While there, he meets Susan Delgado, whom he falls in love with. He also comes into the possession of a pink crystal ball, one of 13 magical artifacts referred to as "Maerlyn's Rainbow." It was while looking into this artifact that Roland first discovered his destiny to quest for the Dark Tower.

Roland is a 30th-generation descendant of his world's version of King Arthur, referred to in the series as Arthur Eld. In Wizard and Glass, during a flashback to Roland's time in the Barony of Mejis, a letter from his father identifies Steven Deschain as a 29th-generation descendant of Arthur Eld from a side lineage (that is to say, from one of Arthur's many "gillies," or concubines). Even his guns were originally made of the melted-down metal from the legendary Excalibur sword. It is hinted that one must possess this sword, or another sign of the Eld (the line of Arthur Eld) in order to open the door at the foot of the Tower. According to a supplemental prose story by Robin Furth included in The Dark Tower: The Gunslinger Born (issues #7 & #2, respectively), Roland's ancestry traces back to Arthur Eld and Emmanuelle Deschain, the daughter of his seneschal, Kay Deschain, while the Crimson King's ancestry traces back to an affair between Arthur and the Crimson Queen.

=== Quest for the Dark Tower ===
Roland on the cover of the comic The Dark Tower: The Gunslinger Born #1.

Roland is alone at the beginning of the series, following the way of ka, a variant of destiny. The eight-book series is about Roland's acquisition of a new ka-tet, a group of people who are deeply bonded to one another through ka, and the completion of his quest to save the Dark Tower. For most of the way, he is accompanied by his ka-tet, the Ka-tet of the Nineteen and Ninety-nine, consisting of Jake Chambers, Eddie Dean, Susannah Dean, and Oy. Among his many enemies on the way are The Man in Black, Mordred, and The Crimson King.

Roland is the last surviving gunslinger and is possessed by his duty as a gunslinger to save The Dark Tower, the axis upon which infinite numbers of parallel worlds rotate. (Eddie Dean, an ex-heroin addict and member of Roland's ka-tet, calls Roland a "Tower junkie.") The Dark Tower is under assault by the Crimson King, Lord of Discordia, bent on destroying the Dark Tower by undermining the "Beams" that support it, and his servant, sorcerer Walter o'Dim.

In the first novel, The Dark Tower: The Gunslinger, Roland's original desire is simply to climb to the Dark Tower's top to question whatever god dwells there, but ka has greater plans for him. The ka-tet he acquires during the series bears many resemblances to his childhood ka-tet, who were all killed trying to help Roland on his quest. How he treats his new ka-tet when faced with decisions between their lives and his quest is a key component of the novels. Ultimately, his ka-tet represents a chance for redemption and a means by which he can ultimately change his own ka.

At the end of the seventh novel, it is revealed that he is trapped in a repetitive cycle of reincarnation, his "damnation" for an unspecified past crime (similar to Stephen King's short story "That Feeling, You Can Only Say What It Is in French", in which he expresses that his idea of hell is repetition). However, it is also suggested that this seemingly eternal repetition is not quite so; after his rebirth at the end of the novel, it is revealed that in this particular reiteration of his journey, he possesses the Horn of Eld which in his previous pilgrimages he had lost in the final stand at Jericho Hill, the one major element which was discrepant from his approach to the tower and Childe Roland's approach in Robert Browning's Childe Roland to the Dark Tower Came ("Dauntless the slug-horn to my lips I set...").

In The Dark Tower (2017), teenager Jake Chambers has visions of a gunslinger named Roland and an evil sorcerer called the Man in Black, Walter O’Dim. Jake discovers that Walter plans to destroy the Dark Tower, which protects the universe from collapsing.

Jake travels to another world and meets Roland, the last gunslinger, who has spent years seeking revenge against Walter for killing his father. At first, Roland cares only about revenge, but he gradually becomes protective of Jake.

Walter captures Jake and uses his psychic powers to attack the Tower. Roland rescues him, fights Walter, and ultimately kills the sorcerer, saving the universe.

In the end, Roland decides to leave his lonely life behind, and Jake joins him as they set off on new adventures together.

== Characteristics ==
Physically, Roland is described by most of his ka'tet as "old long, tall, and ugly" with "blue, bombardier's eyes." He is described as tall and lanky. Emotionally, Roland at times appears detached or unsympathetic, often reacting with seeming indifference or anger at signs of cowardice or self-pity, yet he possesses a strong sense of heroism, often attempting to help those in need. He is shown to be emotionally scarred from the deaths of all his friends and family, often thinking about their words and actions, and he is said (on more than one occasion by himself) to lack imagination. He describes this trait as being "not very good in thinking around corners". He is nevertheless highly intelligent and perceptive, exemplified by his interest in riddles; though he enjoys hearing them, he usually overcomplicates the solution. Cuthbert, Roland's childhood best friend, once said the gears in Roland's head turn slow, but grind extremely well. Roland is impatient, especially when he is under stress, and often makes a rotating gesture with his hand, which means 'go on, hurry, move on' in conversations. Similarly, he prefers not to over-plan his actions, trusting in his instinct and skill at improvising according to the situation. He is also shown not to have a great sense of humor; despite his love for riddles, he rarely jokes and is visibly irritated at times when Eddie (and in the past, Cuthbert) joke around.

In The Waste Lands, Susannah compares Roland first to Marshal Matt Dillon of Gunsmoke, but later comes to believe he is more like John F. Kennedy. While she acknowledges that Roland lacks the president's imagination, both men have similar levels of charisma, cunning, and romance. In Song of Susannah, King tells Roland and Eddie, "You started as a version of Sergio Leone's Man With No Name." King often notes Roland's strong sense of romance in his narrations, but describes this aspect of the gunslinger's character as being usually hidden by his more dominant sense of pragmatism.

Roland is also shown to care a great deal for his Ka-Tet, or "Companions in fate", and often puts himself at risk to save or assist them. When confronted with the choice between saving one of them or getting one step closer to the fabled Dark Tower of legend, Roland often, but not always, feels inclined to choose the Tower; however, many members of his Ka-Tets, both old and new, make the choice for him, suggesting the enormity of his quest.

Roland carries a pair of revolvers, sometimes referred to as "the big guns" by other characters. They are described as long and heavy, with blued steel (originally from his world's Excalibur) and sandalwood grips. These guns are a major sigil, as they are recognized throughout Mid-World and are used as an identifier of Roland. During the search for more ammunition in New York City in The Drawing of the Three, the guns are revealed to be chambered close enough to .45 or the .45 Long Colt to use commercially available cartridges. In The Gunslinger, Roland exhibits a technique for reloading his weapons at blinding speed, though it causes burns to his fingertips when done repeatedly in a short time. He loses this ability at the start of The Drawing of the Three when the first two fingers of his right hand are bitten off. Even after being crippled, he possesses almost superhuman accuracy and he can draw his guns faster than any other character. Roland is noted as being able to shoot equally well with both hands.

In addition to being a master gunslinger, Roland is an experienced traveler, able to hunt, make his own clothes from the skins of animals, and navigate via the stars. Roland can speak five languages, including the High Speech and the Low Speech. He also possess a great deal of knowledge about ka and the nature of the world. Roland is also a skilled leader, diplomat, and teacher.

There is a point during the second book at which Roland psychically bonds himself with a murderer named Jack Mort; the combination of the two personages is said to resemble the mannerisms of Arnold Schwarzenegger as he appeared in The Terminator. Eddie Dean sees Stephen King as a young man and recognizes that he and Roland share many of the same physical features, saying that Roland could be King's father.

Some of his hair is grey or white, but some remains black. His facial features are described as rough (although Susannah once compared them to that of a tired poet; Eddie frequently refers to him as "old long tall and ugly"), and he has light blue eyes, often referred to by characters and Stephen King as "bombardier's eyes." Roland loses his right big toe and his right index and middle fingers, which is problematic as he is right-handed in everything other than shooting. He is a strong and disciplined man, capable of working through injuries and illnesses that would have killed or incapacitated another man. Roland is also unusually tall; at 14, he stood taller than the 16-year-old Susan, and, as an adult, his height exceeds that of his father. In The Dark Tower he is described as having reached an adult height of roughly 6'3". Upon reaching the Tower, he nearly severs one of the remaining fingers on his right hand while tearing up a rose for Patrick Danville to use in coloring a sketch of the Crimson King.

In the last novel, it is implied that the gunslinger's mostly cold, ruthless nature is alleviated slightly every time he reaches the Dark Tower and begins his journey again—Whilst his memories are erased, his personality changes in the reflection of the experiences of each quest. This is symbolized by his re-acquisition of the Horn of Eld after the version covered in the Dark Tower series, implying that he has learned some of the true values of family and love (and patience). He has taken the horn from Cuthbert Allgood's body as he wished rather than leaving it there as he did before.

== Adaptations ==
- In Frank Darabont's 2007 film adaptation of King's novella The Mist, the main character, David Drayton, can be seen painting a movie poster with Roland in the center, standing in front of a trans-dimensional Ironwood door, with a rose and the dark tower to each side.
- Idris Elba portrays Roland in the 2017 film The Dark Tower. Actors Javier Bardem and Russell Crowe were previously considered for the role.
- Sam Strike was cast as young Roland in the Amazon Prime adaptation of the series, The Dark Tower.
