= List of University of Maine people =

The list of University of Maine people includes notable graduates, former students, faculty, and presidents of the University of Maine.

== Arts, literature, and humanities ==
- Lawrence Bender, film producer (Pulp Fiction and Good Will Hunting)
- Will Bonsall, author, seed saver and veganic farmer
- Mary Ellen Chase, Class of 1909, educator, teacher, scholar, and author
- Donald DePoy, Classes of 1994/1996, bluegrass musician, music educator, and music event organizer
- Nick Di Paolo, Class of 1984, stand-up comedian, actor, writer, and podcaster
- Biff Elliot, actor
- Clarine Coffin Grenfell, Class of 1932, author and poet
- Rick Hautala, Class of 1970, author
- Donald Holder, Class of 1980, Tony-winning Broadway lighting designer (The Lion King)
- Stephen King, Class of 1970, author
- Tabitha King, Class of 1971, author
- Bruce McMillan, Class of 1969, author, photo-illustrator, poet, watercolor painter
- Patrice Oppliger, scholar of popular culture and assistant professor, Boston University College of Communication
- Judy Pancoast, Class of 1997, children's music singer and songwriter
- Tina Passman, classical scholar
- Timothy Simons, Class of 2001, actor and comedian best known for his role as Jonah Ryan on the HBO television series Veep
- Brad Sullivan, actor
- Paul Theroux, author
- Rudy Vallée, attended 1921–1922, jazz singer and pop star of the 1920s

== Business & Journalism ==
- Colby Chandler, Class of 1950, former CEO, Eastman Kodak
- Francis Clergue, businessman, industrialist
- Harold Allen Fernald, Class of 1954, publishing executive and philanthropist
- Chandler C. Harvey, Classes of 1890/1893, newspaper publisher

== Military ==
- Dana T. Merrill, United States Army brigadier general
- Robert A. Rushworth, Class of 1951, Air Force test pilot
- Alfred A. Starbird, US Army brigadier general

== Politics ==
- Albert E. Anderson, Class of 1909, state legislator (1917–1918) and attorney
- John Baldacci, Class of 1986, governor of Maine (2003–2011)
- Janet Bewley, member of the Wisconsin Legislature
- Joseph E. Brennan, governor of Maine (1979–1987), member of the United States House of Representatives (1987–1991)
- Styles Bridges, governor of New Hampshire (1935–1937), U.S. senator (1937–1961)
- Emily Cain, Class of 2002, state legislator (2005–2014)
- Ben Chipman, state representative from Portland
- Patricia M. Collins, two-term mayor of Caribou, Maine, and civic leader
- Samuel Collins, Jr., state senator (1974–1984) and Maine Supreme Court associate justice (1988–1994)
- W. Edward Crockett, bachelor's 1983, member of the Maine House of Representatives
- Matthew Dunlap, secretary of state of Maine (2005–2011; 2013–present)
- Linda Smith Dyer, J.D. 1980, lawyer, lobbyist, women's rights activist, co-founder of the Maine Women's Lobby
- Peter Edgecomb, state representative from Caribou (2004–2012)
- Keith Farnham, member of the Illinois House of Representatives (2009–2014)
- Wallace Rider Farrington, Class of 1891, governor of Hawai'i (1921–1929), founder of University of Hawaiʻi
- Roger Fuller, Maine House of Representatives (2016–2018)
- David Haggan, Class of 1989, member of the Maine House of Representatives (2016–)
- Charles Harlow, member of the Maine House of Representatives (2004–2010)
- DebraLee Hovey, member of the Connecticut House of Representatives
- Edwin F. Ladd, U.S. senator from North Dakota (1921–1925)
- Paul LePage, governor of Maine (2011–2019)
- Kenneth P. MacLeod, Class of 1940, president of the Maine Senate
- Ann Matlack, member of the Maine House of Representatives
- John R. McKernan, Jr., governor of Maine (1987–1995), member of the United States House of Representatives (1983–1987)
- Anne C. Perry, member of the Maine House of Representatives
- Lee W. Quimby, member of the New Hampshire House of Representatives
- Ambureen Rana, member of the Maine House of Representatives
- Leigh Saufley, Class of 1976, Maine Supreme Court chief justice (2001–2020)
- Tom Saviello, member of the Maine Senate (2011–2018)
- David Slagger, member of the Maine House of Representatives representing the Maliseet people (2012)
- Olympia Snowe, Class of 1969, U.S. senator from Maine (1995–2013)
- C. Donald Stritch, member of the New Hampshire House of Representatives
- Gregory Swallow, Class of 1981, member of the Maine House of Representatives

== Science and engineering ==
- Paul André Albert, Class of 1950, engineer and inventor, IBM and founder of ACI Alloys
- Doris Twitchell Allen, Psychologist and Children's International Summer Villages founder
- Harold Beverage, Class of 1915, inventor, vice president of R&D at RCA Communications
- Pearce Paul Creasman, Class of 2003, Egyptologist and archaeologist; director, University of Arizona Egyptian Expedition
- Francis T. Crowe, Class of 1905, civil engineer, chief engineer of the Hoover Dam, namesake of the Francis Crowe Society
- Elizabeth DeLong, Class of 1969 and 1970, biostatistician
- Maurice K. Goddard, former secretary of the Pennsylvania Department of Conservation and Natural Resources, a driving force in the creation of 45 Pennsylvania state parks during his 24 years in office
- Leslie Holdridge, Class of 1931, botanist
- Ashok Jhunjhunwala, Class of 1979, professor at IIT Madras and Padma Shri recipient
- Frank Knight, arborist
- Louis LaPierre, Class of 1974, former professor of ecology who resigned from the Order of Canada after it was discovered that he had misrepresented his academic credentials
- Bernard Lown, Class of 1942, Nobel Peace Prize winner
- Richard Lutz, Class of 1975, deep sea vent researcher, director of the Institute of Marine and Coastal Sciences
- Francis T. McAndrew, Ph.D. 1981, Social Psychologist, Professor, & Science Writer
- Chuck Peddle, Engineering Physics 1959, main developer of the MOS Technology 6502 microprocessor
- Lore Alford Rogers, Class of 1896, USDA dairy scientist and bacteriologist
- Ronald A. Roy, Engineering Physics 1981, 65th George Eastman Chaired Professor, head of the Department of Engineering Science, University of Oxford
- Mildred Brown Schrumpf, Class of 1925, Maine food educator and columnist
- Robert Slocum, botanist and biologist
- Scott Michael Zoldi, Engineering Physics 1994, Chief Analytics Officer and senior data scientist at Fair Isaac Corporation (FICO)

== Sports ==
- Bob Beers, NHL player, Boston Bruins, Tampa Bay Lightning, Edmonton Oilers, New York Islanders; color commentator on Bruins radio broadcasts
- Jovan Belcher, former linebacker for the Kansas City Chiefs
- Ben Bishop, NHL goalie, Tampa Bay Lightning
- Cindy Blodgett, basketball player in the WNBA and former women's basketball program head coach at the University of Maine
- Mike Bordick, former Major League Baseball shortstop
- Jim Boylen, head coach, Chicago Bulls
- D'Lo Brown (born Accie Conner), professional wrestler
- Mike Buck, former quarterback for the New Orleans Saints
- Jack Capuano, NHL defenseman; coach of the New York Islanders
- Rick Carlisle, NBA player, Indiana Pacers coach (transferred to University of Virginia)
- Dave Cloutier, former American Football League safety for the Boston Patriots
- Stephen Cooper, former linebacker for the San Diego Chargers
- Scott Darling, Goalie, won the 2014–15 Stanley Cup with the Chicago Blackhawks
- Mike DeVito, former defensive end for the New York Jets
- Niko Dimitrakos, professional ice hockey player
- Mike Dunham, former NHL player and Olympian (2002)
- Chad Finn, sportswriter
- Mike Flynn, center, Baltimore Ravens
- Brian Gaine, NFL executive
- Barrett Heisten, ECHL player, Alaska Aces
- Jimmy Howard, NHL goalie, Detroit Red Wings
- Ben Hutton, defenseman Vancouver Canucks
- Martin John, professional soccer player, full back, Cardiff City
- Joe Johnson, baseball player for Atlanta Braves, Toronto Blue Jays
- Paul Kariya, NHL player for St. Louis Blues, eldest Kariya brother
- Martin Kariya, KHL player, Dinamo Riga, younger brother of Paul and Steve
- Steve Kariya, SEL player, Frölunda HC, middle brother of Paul and Martin
- Noam Laish (born 1993), Israeli basketball player
- Jack Leggett, baseball head coach, Clemson University
- Ryan Lomberg, NHL Left Winger, Florida Panthers
- Mike Lundin, NHL player, Tampa Bay Lightning
- Riley Masters, mid-distance runner
- Brandon McGowan, defensive back, New England Patriots
- Kevin McMahan, wide receiver, 2006 Mr. Irrelevant
- Carl "Stump" Merrill, former manager of the New York Yankees
- Jim Montgomery, Head Coach, Boston Bruins
- Greg Moore, AHL player, Hartford Wolfpack
- Matthew Mulligan, tight end, Detroit Lions
- Gustav Nyquist, NHL player, Detroit Red Wings
- Montell Owens, former fullback for the Jacksonville Jaguars
- Bill Patrick (aka Gerard Monteux), NBC, Versus Network announcer and columnist
- Sam Pelletier, distance runner
- Jeremy Peña, MLB player, Houston Astros
- Dustin Penner, NHL player, Anaheim Ducks, Edmonton Oilers, Los Angeles Kings
- Jeff Plympton, MLB, Boston Red Sox
- Teddy Purcell, NHL winger, Edmonton Oilers
- Irv Ray, MLB player, Boston Beaneaters, Baltimore Orioles
- Patrick Ricard, American football player for the Baltimore Ravens
- Viktoriya Rybalko, track-and-field long jumper
- Devin Shore, Anaheim Ducks
- Garth Snow, NHL player, Colorado Avalanche, Philadelphia Flyers, Vancouver Canucks, Pittsburgh Penguins, New York Islanders; general manager of Islanders
- Daren Stone, safety, Atlanta Falcons, Dallas Cowboys, Baltimore Ravens
- Justin Strzelczyk, former offensive lineman for the Pittsburgh Steelers
- Jeremy Swayman, NHL goaltender, Boston Bruins
- Mark Sweeney, Major League Baseball outfielder
- Bill Swift, former Major League Baseball pitcher
- Lofa Tatupu, former NFL player and Pro Bowl linebacker, Seattle Seahawks (transferred to University of Southern California)
- Larry Thomas, former Major League Baseball player
- Gary Thorne ESPN sports analyst and play-by-play announcer
- John Tortorella, NHL head coach, Philadelphia Flyers
- Eric Weinrich, NHL player and 1988 USA Olympic hockey team member

== Faculty and administration ==
=== Presidents ===
The following is a list of presidents of the University of Maine.

	President	Tenure	Events
–	Merritt Caldwell Fernald	July 15, 1868 – August 31, 1871	Acting president
1.	Charles Frederick Allen	September 1, 1871 – December 31, 1878	
2.	Merritt Caldwell Fernald	March 1, 1879 – August 31, 1893	
3.	Abram W. Harris	September 1, 1893 – December 31, 1901	
4.	George Fellows	January 1, 1902 – August 31, 1910	
–	James Norris Hart	September 1, 1910 – December 31, 1910	Acting president
5.	Robert Judson Aley	January 1, 1911 – August 5, 1921	
–	Joint Committee of the Board of Trustees	August 6, 1921 – April 7, 1922	
6.	Clarence Cook Little	April 8, 1922 – August 31, 1925	Resigned to become president of the University of Michigan
– 7.	Harold Boardman	September 1, 1925 – June 30, 1934	Acting president until June 12, 1926
8.	Arthur Hauck	July 1, 1934 – February 28, 1958	Longest serving president
–	Joseph M. Murray	March 1, 1958 – June 30, 1958	Acting president
9.	Lloyd Hartman Elliott	July 1, 1958 – September 30, 1965	Resigned to become president of the George Washington University
10.	Hugh Young	October 1, 1965 – June 30, 1968	
– 11.	Winthrop Libby	July 1, 1968 – August 31, 1973	Acting president until April 16, 1969
12.	Howard R. Neville	September 1, 1973 – August 30, 1979	
–	Kenneth W. Allen	July 26, 1979 – August 24, 1980	Acting president. Tenure overlapped with those of both his predecessor and successor. He was only outright acting president for approximately 7 months.
13	Paul H. Silverman	April 25, 1980 – August 31, 1984	
14.	Arthur M. Johnson	July 8, 1984 – August 31, 1986	
15.	Dale W. Lick	September 1, 1986 – June 30, 1991	
–	Gregory N. Brown	February 24, 1992 – March 30, 1992	Acting president
16.	Frederick E. Hutchinson	April 1, 1992 – June 30, 1997	
–	John A. Alexander	July 1, 1997 – July 31, 1997	Acting president
17.	Peter S. Hoff	August 1, 1997 – August 15, 2004	
18.	Robert A. Kennedy	April 15, 2005 – June 30, 2011	
19.	Paul W. Ferguson	July 1, 2011 – July 6, 2014	
20.	Susan J. Hunter	July 7, 2014 – June 30, 2018	First female president of the university
21.	Joan Ferrini-Mundy	July 1, 2018 – present	

=== Anthropology, Psychology, & Sociology ===
- Steven Barkan, sociologist and criminologist
- Alvin C. Eurich, Educational Psychologist and first president of the State University of New York
- Edward D. Ives, folklorist
- Kyriacos C. Markides, sociologist known for the study of Christian mysticism
- Colin Martindale, psychologist known for the study of creativity
- Darren Ranco, Penobscot Nation anthropologist
- Richard M. Ryckman, psychologist and author of a popular textbook on personality
- Daniel H. Sandweiss, anthropologist and geoarchaeologist; known for the study of climate change

=== Arts & Humanities ===
- Douglas Allen, Philosopher; peace and justice scholar and activist
- Eileen Farrell, opera singer
- Alan Shulman, composer and cellist

=== History ===
- Robert H. Babcock, Labor Historian
- Caroline Colvin, One of the first women in the U.S. to chair a major university academic department
- Clark G. Reynolds, professor of History (1968–1976)
- David C. Smith, Historian

=== Science & Mathematics ===
- Hugh Hamilton DeWitt, faculty 1969–1995, ichthyologist, marine biologist and oceanographer
- H. A. Pogorzelski, mathematician and director of the Research Institute for Mathematics
- John Franklin Witter, veterinarian specializing in avian medicine

=== Other ===
- Joanne P. McCallie, women's basketball coach at multiple high profile NCAA Division I programs
- Charles L. Phillips, professor of military science and tactics, U.S. Army brigadier general
- Joseph W. Westphal, political scientist and administrator; former Undersecretary of the Army and ambassador to Saudi Arabia
