= Chandler C. Harvey =

American newspaper publisher (1866–1940)

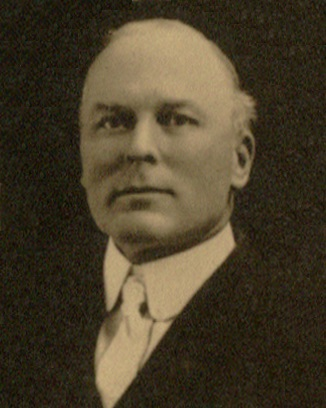
- Portrait of Harvey, 1911
- Born: Chandler Cushman Harvey; February 2, 1866; Fort Fairfield, Maine, U.S.
- Died: January 25, 1940 (aged 73); Fort Fairfield, Maine, U.S.
- Education: Maine State College (BS, MS)
- Occupation: Newspaper publisher
- Political party: Democratic
- Spouse: Lena May Osgood (m. 1902)
- Children: 4

Chandler Cushman Harvey (February 2, 1866 – January 25, 1940) was an American newspaper editor and publisher. A native of Fort Fairfield, Maine, he pursued a career in civil engineering before switching to journalism. He purchased the weekly Fort Fairfield Review in 1902, editing it from then until his death nearly forty years later. He was a longtime member of the Maine Press Association and served for a time as that body's president.

A staunch Democrat, Harvey was active in local politics and was, for a number of years, chairman of both the town's board of selectmen as well as its Democratic committee. He was elected clerk of the Maine House of Representatives during its 1911–12 and 1915–16 sessions, when Democrats held control of the body, and was an unsuccessful candidate for both the state house and Maine Senate.

== Early life and education ==
Harvey was born in Fort Fairfield, Maine on February 2, 1866, the second of six children. His father, with whom he was especially close, was James Cushman Harvey (1839–1922), a farmer who had moved north from Phillips as a young boy. His mother was the former Mary Lucretia Chandler (1841–1923), a Maysville native. In his youth, he worked on the family farm and attended local schools, including Fort Fairfield High School.

In 1887, Harvey began the course in civil engineering at Maine State College, later the University of Maine, and completed his degree in three years while simultaneously working as a teacher in rural schools. He was a member of Phi Gamma Delta social fraternity, first lieutenant and quartermaster in the school's "Coburn Cadet" corps, and managing editor of the student newspaper, The Cadet. He won the Prentiss Prize for best junior composition with his essay, "Immensity of the Universe," and maintained the highest standing in his class, graduating as valedictorian.

After graduation, Harvey moved to northwestern Montana and worked in that state, Idaho, and Washington as an engineer supervising construction on the Great Northern Railway. Following a return to Orono, where he earned a master's degree in 1893 with the thesis "Practical Hints on Railway Levelling," he was hired as a draftsman for the Thomson-Houston Electric Company in Lynn, Massachusetts.

In 1894, Harvey went back to Fort Fairfield, where he would reside the rest of his life. He married Lena May Osgood on August 1, 1902 at the town's Methodist Episcopal church, in a ceremony performed by Reverend Frank H. Osgood, pastor of the church and father of the bride. The couple honeymooned in Montreal. They went on to have four children: Helen (b. 1903), Thomas (b. 1906), Kingdon (b. 1908), and Alice (b. 1916).

== Later life and death ==
Harvey died of pneumonia at his home on January 25, 1940.

In 2004, he was posthumously honored with the University of Maine's second annual Fogler Legacy Award. Given to the patriarch of a family with at least three generations of graduates, two or more of the graduating family members must demonstrate "a record of outstanding service to their alma mater, the Alumni Association, their community, and/or their profession."

== See also ==
- List of University of Maine people
