= C. C. Little =

American geneticist (1888–1971)

Clarence Cook Little
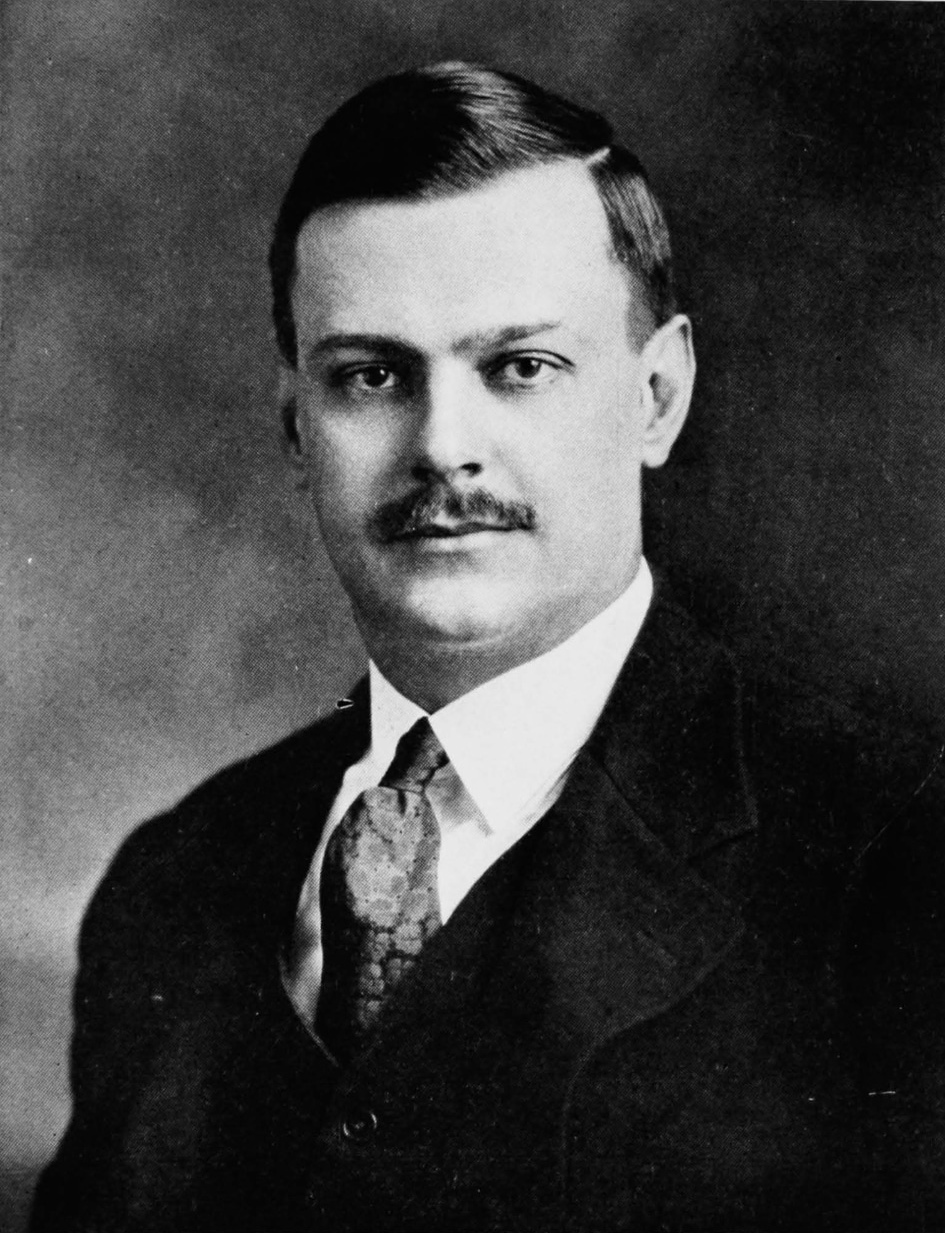

6th President of the University of Michigan
- In office 1925–1929
- Preceded by: Alfred Henry Lloyd (acting); Marion LeRoy Burton
- Succeeded by: Alexander Grant Ruthven

6th President of the University of Maine
- In office 1922–1925
- Preceded by: Board of Trustees (acting); Robert J. Aley
- Succeeded by: Harold S. Boardman

Personal details
- Born: October 6, 1888 Brookline, Massachusetts, U.S.
- Died: December 22, 1971 (aged 83) Ellsworth, Maine, U.S.
- Education: Harvard University
- Profession: Academic administrator, researcher

Clarence Cook Little (October 6, 1888 – December 22, 1971) was an American genetics, cancer, and tobacco researcher and academic administrator, as well as a proponent of eugenics.

== Early life ==
C. C. Little was born in Brookline, Massachusetts and attended Harvard University after his secondary education at the Noble and Greenough School. Little received an A.B. from Harvard University in 1910, an M.S. in 1912, and D.Sc. in 1914 in zoology, with special focus in the new science of genetics. During World War I, Little served in the U.S. Army Signal Corps, attaining the rank of Major. Following the war he spent three years at the Cold Spring Harbor Laboratory. In 1921, he helped found the American Birth Control League with Margaret Sanger and Lothrop Stoddard.

== Career ==
While studying under W. E. Castle, Little began his work with mice, focusing on inheritance, transplants, and grafts. He also was an assistant dean and secretary to the president. In 1921, he inbred the mouse strain C57BL/6 or "black 6", which is the most popular laboratory mouse to date. His most important research occurred at Harvard, including what some call his most brilliant work, "A Mendelian explanation for the inheritance of a trait that has apparently non-Mendelian characteristics". His observations on transplant rejection became codified into the "five laws of transplant immunology" by George Snell. Little developed the Dilute, Brown and non-Agouti (DBA) strain of mice while at Harvard. For his research, he received posthumously the 1978 Cancer Research Institute William B. Coley Award.

Little accepted the post of President of the University of Maine in 1922, becoming at age 33 the youngest university president in the country. While there he started a summer laboratory in Bar Harbor. In 1925, he left to become the President of the University of Michigan. His tenure at the university was controversial due to his outspokenness in favor of eugenics, birth control, and euthanasia.

He left Michigan in 1929 in order to devote himself to his research at Bar Harbor. Also in 1929, he took on a part-time job as managing director of the American Society for the Control of Cancer (later became the American Cancer Society (ACS)) and served as President to the American Eugenics Society.

Funding for the Jackson Laboratory was extremely limited during the Great Depression, but it received one of the first grants from the newly formed National Cancer Institute in 1938. Little energetically developed both the lab and the ACS, and by 1944 they were shipping 9000 mice a week to other laboratories. The laboratory and all of the livestock were destroyed in the Great Bar Harbor Fire in the Fall of 1947. The lab was quickly rebuilt and most mouse strains were recovered from other labs around the world. By 1950, the lab was maintaining 60 inbred strains, and had developed the F_{1} hybrid that became widely used for chemical testing. Little resigned in 1954.

His last major post, from 1954 to 1969, was as the Scientific Director of the Scientific Advisory Board of the Tobacco Industry Research Committee (renamed Council for Tobacco Research in 1964). In that role, he was a leading scientific voice of the tobacco industry and oversaw a USD 1 million research budget that gave grants to hundreds of scientists. In 1959, he refuted his earlier assertion, made as Director of the ACS, that inhaling fine particles is unhealthy, and stated that smoking does not cause lung cancer and is at most a minor contributing factor. A decade later he stated, "there is no demonstrated causal relationship between smoking or any disease." In keeping with his earlier research, he believed that the main cause of cancer was genetic, not environmental.

== Death and legacy ==
Little died of a heart attack in 1971 in Ellsworth, Maine at the age of 83.

The C. C. Little Science Building at the University of Michigan, and C. C. Little Hall at the University of Maine, were both named in his honor. In 2017, five faculty members and an undergraduate student submitted a formal request to University of Michigan President Mark Schlissel to change the building's name because of Little's previous support of eugenics. The C. C. Little Science Building sign was replaced without Little's name on March 29, 2018. On April 26, 2021, the University of Maine announced that C. C. Little Hall would be renamed after Beryl Williams. In 2022 the name change was complete. The building is now formally called Beryl Warner Williams Hall, and has a new cultural exhibit in the lobby.

== See also ==
- Eugenics in the United States

Academic offices
Preceded by Robert Judson Aley	President of the University of Maine; 1922–1925	Succeeded by Harold Sherburne Boardman
Preceded by Alfred Henry Lloyd (interim); Marion LeRoy Burton	6th President of the University of Michigan; 1925–1929	Succeeded by Alexander Grant Ruthven
