= Fort Kent (fort) =

Historic site in Maine, United States

- U.S. National Register of Historic Places
- U.S. National Historic Landmark
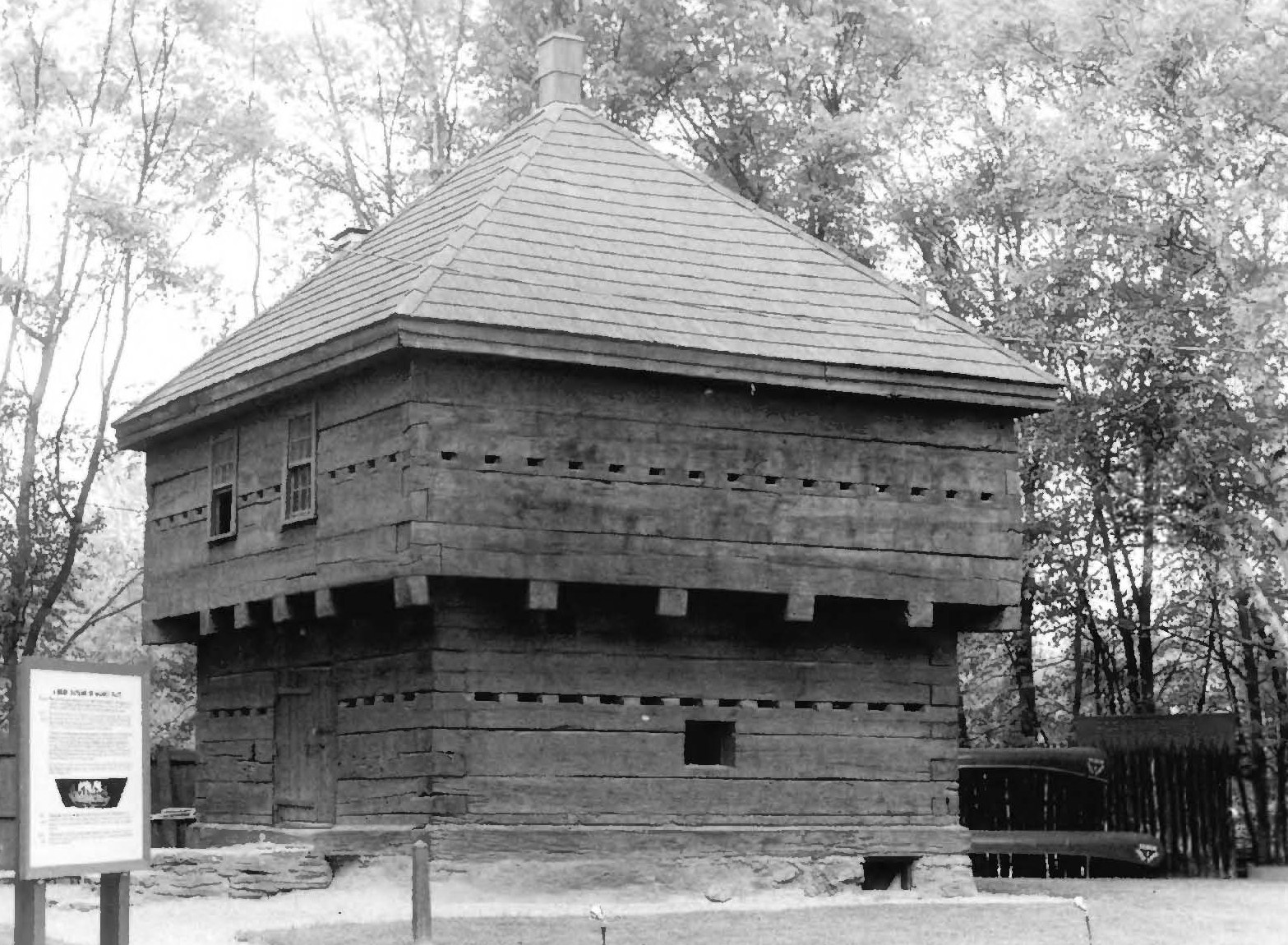
- The fort before full restoration.

- Location within Maine
- Interactive map of Fort Kent
- Nearest city: Fort Kent, Maine
- Coordinates: 47°15′10″N 68°35′42″W
- Built: 1839
- NRHP reference No.: 69000005

Significant dates
- Added to NRHP: December 1, 1969
- Designated NHL: November 7, 1973

Fort Kent, located at the confluence of the Fish and Saint John rivers in the town of Fort Kent, Maine, United States, is the only surviving American fortification built during the border tensions with neighboring New Brunswick known as the Aroostook War. It is preserved as the Fort Kent State Historic Site, which features an original log blockhouse that is open for visits in the summer. The fort was added to the National Register of Historic Places in 1969 and declared a National Historic Landmark in 1973.

== Description ==
Fort Kent stands on a slight rise overlooking the Saint John River, just west of the mouth of the Fish River. The Saint John is in this area part of the Canada–United States border, and the region on both sides of the river was until the 1842 Webster-Ashburton Treaty territory disputed by both the United States and the United Kingdom, of which New Brunswick was then a colonial province.

All that remains of Fort Kent is a blockhouse, two stories in height, measuring 23 feet 5 inches (7.14 m) square. This was, however, the extent of fortification at the site; there were no earthworks, or even a stockade around the fort’s cookhouse, stables, or other supporting buildings. It is built out of hand-hewn cedar timbers, and has an overhanging second story and a pyramidal roof. Each side of the roof is pierced by a gabled dormer. The main entrance faces west, and is flanked by four rifle ports on the first floor, and there are twelve rifle ports on the first floor of each of the other three sides. On the second floor, which hangs 15 inches (0.38 m) over the first, there are eleven rifle ports on the east and west sides, and fifteen on the north and south sides. There are two cannon ports on the first floor north and south sides, but, for lack of funds, guns were never actually placed there. The interior has been modestly disturbed to install heating and plumbing, and to provide for museum displays.

== History ==
The boundary between Maine and New Brunswick was a recurring subject of disagreement following the 1783 Treaty of Paris, in which Great Britain recognized the United States. Part of the eastern border was fixed after the Jay Treaty of 1797, but the upper Saint John River area remained disputed. Both Maine and New Brunswick pressed development of the area to solidify their claims, but this consequently raised tensions beginning in the 1820s, with authorities from each government acting against the other's settlers and agents.

Construction of Fort Kent, named for Governor Edward Kent, was begun 1838 as tensions reached their height. It was one of a series of forts built by the state along the southern banks of the Saint John River, and is the only one surviving. (The blockhouse at Fort Fairfield is a 20th-century reconstruction.)

In 1839 the arrest of a US government agent in New Brunswick prompted Congress to authorize 50,000 federal troops for assignment to northern Maine. At this time the fort was enlarged to include barracks officers' quarters, and other buildings. General Winfield Scott was sent to the area with power to negotiate a settlement. Scott and New Brunswick Lieutenant Governor John Harvey, who had a long-established friendship, were able to successfully reduce tensions until the Webster-Ashburton Treaty was negotiated in 1842.

United States troops remained at the fort to 1845. After the crisis passed, the fort was sold into private hands. In 1891 the property was sold to the state of Maine for the purpose of establishing a park. The state did no substantive work on the site until 1959, when the historic site was formally established. The museum is now maintained by the Fort Kent Historical Society.

== Vandalism ==
Fort Kent has been subject to numerous incidents of vandalism in recent history. Most notably in 1977 when the fort was almost burned down when an unidentified individual etched the phrase "Jeano was Here" into the exterior of the upper terrace using a portable torch. Although no arrests were made, officials believed it was a resident of the nearby town of Fort Kent. In 2010 the National Park Service removed over 500 lbs of shredded paper that vandals used to fill the interior of the Fort. This resulted in the fort being closed to the public for almost a month. Recently, Stafford Academy of Technology students have been trying to uncover the vandals using camera and audio equipment surrounding the structure.

== See also ==
- List of National Historic Landmarks in Maine
- National Register of Historic Places listings in Aroostook County, Maine
