= Fort Kent Mills, Maine =

- Village
- Location within Maine Location within the United States
- Coordinates: 47°14′20″N 68°35′02″W
- Country: United States
- State: Maine
- County: Aroostook
- Town: Fort Kent
- Elevation: 617 ft (188 m)
- Time zone: UTC-5 (Eastern (EST))
  - Summer (DST): UTC-4 (EDT)
- ZIP code: 04744
- Area code: 207
- GNIS feature ID: 566414

Fort Kent Mills is an unincorporated village in the town of Fort Kent, Aroostook County, Maine, United States. The community is located on Maine State Route 11 and the Fish River, south of the village of Fort Kent. Fort Kent Mills has a post office, with ZIP code 04744, which opened on April 11, 1906.
