= Fort Kent (CDP), Maine =

Fort Kent, Maine
- Census-designated place
- Location of Fort Kent, Maine
- Coordinates: 47°14′48″N 68°36′28″W
- Country: United States
- State: Maine
- County: Aroostook
- Town: Fort Kent

Area
  - Total: 5.62 sq mi (14.55 km^{2})
  - Land: 5.36 sq mi (13.87 km^{2})
  - Water: 0.26 sq mi (0.68 km^{2})
- Elevation: 505 ft (154 m)

Population (2020)
  - Total: 2,413
  - Density: 450.6/sq mi (173.97/km^{2})
- Time zone: UTC-5 (Eastern (EST))
  - Summer (DST): UTC-4 (EDT)
- ZIP Codes: 04743 (Fort Kent); 04744 (Fort Kent Mills)
- Area code: 207
- FIPS code: 23-25720
- GNIS feature ID: 2377911

Fort Kent is a census-designated place (CDP) that comprises the main village in the town of Fort Kent in Aroostook County, Maine, United States. In 2010, Fort Kent's population was 2,488 of 4,097 for the entire town.

== Geography ==
The Fort Kent CDP is located along the Saint John River, which forms the northern border of the town as well as the Canada–United States border. The northern terminus of U.S. Route 1 is near the center of the CDP, at the bridge across the Saint John River into Clair, New Brunswick. Maine State Route 161 and Maine State Route 11 intersect Route 1 within the CDP.

According to the United States Census Bureau, the CDP has a total area of 5.6 square miles (14.5 km^{2}), of which 5.4 square miles (13.9 km^{2}) is land and 0.23 square miles (0.6 km^{2}), or 4.01%, is water. The CDP is located at the confluence of the Fish River with the Saint John River.

== Demographics ==
Historical population
Census	Pop.	Note	%±
2020	2,413		—
U.S. Decennial Census

Languages (2000)	Percent
Spoke French at home	60.66%
Spoke English at home	39.34%

As of the census of 2000, there were 1,979 people, 894 households, and 455 families residing in the CDP. The population density was 610.8 inhabitants per square mile (235.8/km^{2}). There were 940 housing units at an average density of 290.3 per square mile (112.1/km^{2}). The racial makeup of the CDP was 97.07% White, 0.51% Black or African American, 0.61% Native American, 0.96% Asian, 0.10% from other races, and 0.76% from two or more races. Hispanic or Latino of any race were 0.61% of the population.

There were 894 households, out of which 19.8% had children under the age of 18 living with them, 42.8% were married couples living together, 5.8% had a female householder with no husband present, and 49.1% were non-families. 40.6% of all households were made up of individuals, and 20.4% had someone living alone who was 65 years of age or older. The average household size was 2.03 and the average family size was 2.76.

In the CDP, the population was spread out, with 16.8% under the age of 18, 15.6% from 18 to 24, 23.4% from 25 to 44, 21.8% from 45 to 64, and 22.4% who were 65 years of age or older. The median age was 41 years. For every 100 females, there were 88.2 males. For every 100 females age 18 and over, there were 86.5 males.

The median income for a household in the CDP was $20,914, and the median income for a family was $36,250. Males had a median income of $38,333 versus $18,092 for females. The per capita income for the CDP was $13,882. About 12.8% of families and 22.7% of the population were below the poverty line, including 25.0% of those under age 18 and 20.2% of those age 65 or over.
