= Susan Hunter =

Susan Hunter may refer to

- Susan Hunter (swimmer) (born 1955), New Zealand swimmer who competed at the 1972 and 1976 Olympics
- Susan J. Hunter, American academic and president of the University of Maine
