= Fort Kent station =

- Fort Kent Railroad Station
- U.S. National Register of Historic Places
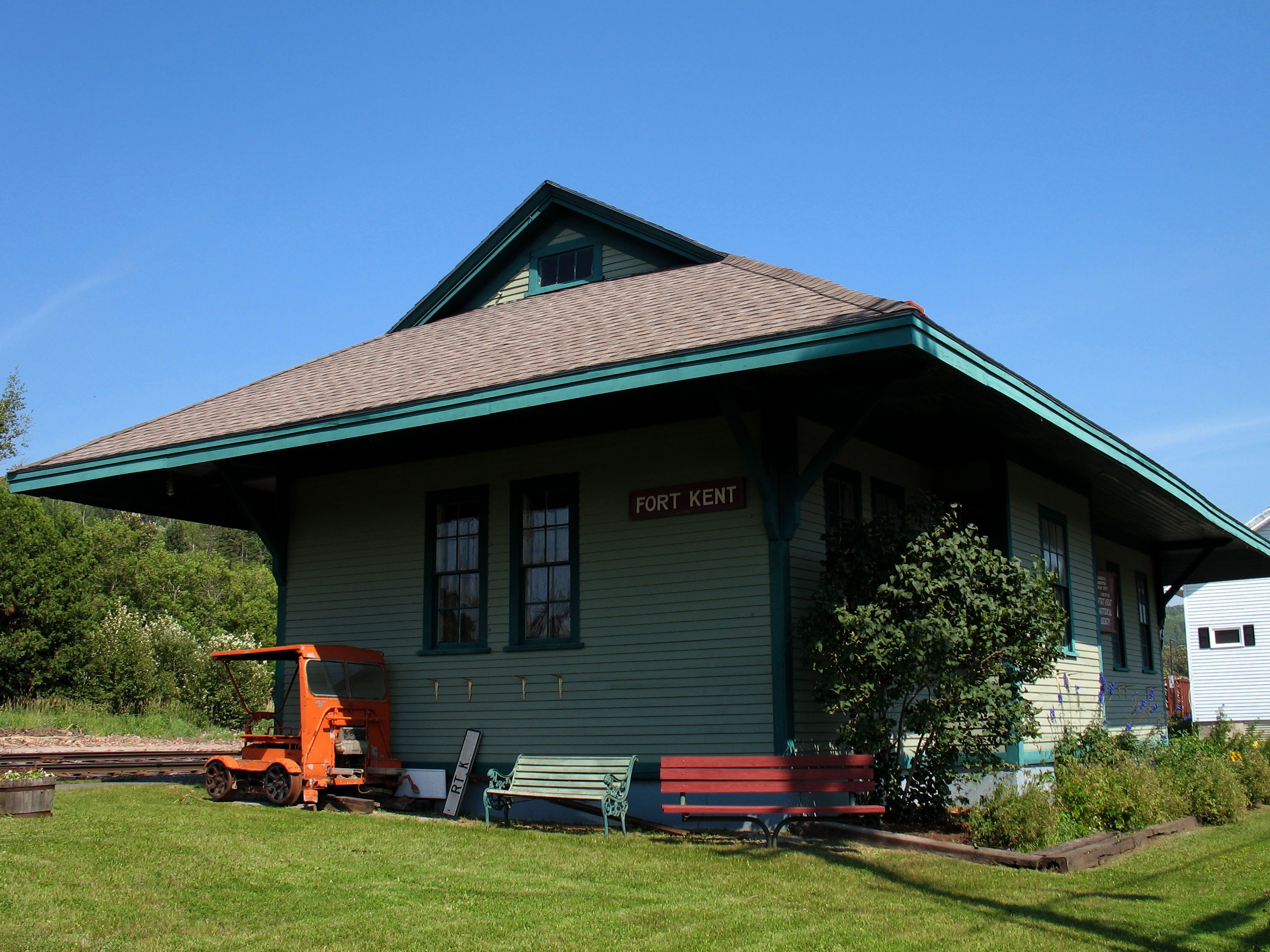

- Location within Maine Location within the United States
- Location: Jct. Main and Market Sts., Fort Kent, Maine
- Coordinates: 47°15′27″N 68°35′23″W
- Area: less than one acre
- Built: 1902
- Architectural style: B&A RR Station
- NRHP reference No.: 89000249
- Added to NRHP: April 21, 1989

The Fort Kent Railroad Station is a historic railroad station at Main and Market Streets in Fort Kent, Maine. It was built in 1902 by the Fish River Railroad, a line that was used in service until 1979. The station is now home to a museum operated by the Fort Kent Historical Society, dedicated to the local history of the railroad and its influence on the region. The building was listed on the National Register of Historic Places on April 21, 1989.

== Description and history ==
The Fort Kent Railroad Station is located at the northeast corner of Main and Market Streets (United States Route 1 and Maine State Route 161 respectively), between Market Street to the west and the railroad track to the east. It is a long rectangular single-story wood frame structure with a gable-on-hip roof, clapboard siding, and a concrete foundation. The station's east facade has a projecting telegrapher's bay, large baggage doors to the south, and windows and doors for the ticketing area and waiting room to the north.

The station was opened in 1902 by the Fish River Railroad, which was later absorbed into the Bangor and Aroostook Railroad. The railroad's arrival had a major economic impact on the regions, enabling the shipment of its products (principally lumber and potatoes) to distant markets. By the 1970s the railroad was in decline, and in 1979 the station was given to the Fort Kent Historical Society. Of the stations built by either railroad, this one is among the best-preserved. Its interior has been converted into a museum space dedicated to local rail-related history, and is generally open during summer months.

== See also ==
- National Register of Historic Places listings in Aroostook County, Maine
