= Joan Ferrini-Mundy =

American mathematics educator

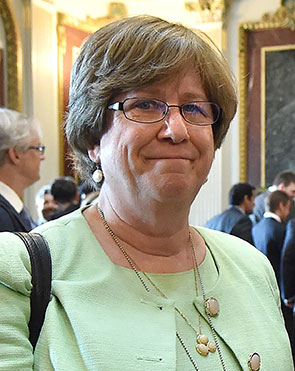
- Ferrini-Mundy in 2018

21st President of the University of Maine
- Incumbent
- Assumed office July 1, 2018
- Preceded by: Susan Hunter

Personal details
- Born: July 14, 1954 (age 72)
- Education: University of New Hampshire (BS, MS, PhD)

Academic background
- Thesis: Spatial ability, mathematics achievement, and spatial training in male and female calculus students (1980)
- Doctoral advisor: Richard Balomenos

Academic work
- Discipline: mathematics education
- Institutions: Mount Holyoke College; University of New Hampshire; Michigan State University; National Science Foundation; University of Maine

Joan Ferrini-Mundy (born July 14, 1954) is an American academic. Her research interests include calculus teaching and learning, mathematics teacher learning, and STEM education policy. She is currently the president of the University of Maine.

== Career and research ==
Ferrini-Mundy earned a Ph.D. in mathematics education from the University of New Hampshire (UNH) in 1980 and spent two years there as a postdoctoral associate. After one year at Mount Holyoke College, she returned to UNH as a faculty member in mathematics until joining the faculty of Michigan State University in 1999. One year later, she chaired the writing group for Standards 2000, a publication from the National Council of Teachers of Mathematics.

Ferrini-Mundy served as director of the Mathematical Sciences Education Board at the National Academy of Sciences, and subsequently joined the mathematics and teacher education faculty of Michigan State University and served as associate dean for science and mathematics education in the College of Natural Science and director of the Division of Science and Mathematics Education.

In 2007, Ferrini-Mundy joined the National Science Foundation (NSF) as the director of the new Division of Research on Learning in Formal and Informal Settings in the Directorate for Education and Human Resources; she remained a faculty member at Michigan State until 2010. From 2007 to 2009, she served on the education subcommittee of the National Science and Technology Council.

In February 2011, Ferrini-Mundy became the assistant director of the National Science Foundation's Directorate for Education and Human Resources. In this strategic role, she set the NSF's direction for scientific education. In 2014 she was elected to the executive committee of the Association for Women in Mathematics for a 2-year term.

In June 2017, she was appointed the chief operating officer of the NSF. One year later, she left the NSF to become the 21st president of the University of Maine.

After becoming the president of the University of Maine in 2018, in 2021 she was also appointed University of Maine System (UMS) vice chancellor for research and innovation where she leads a formalized effort to make the University of Maine’s research infrastructure accessible to and supportive of all universities and faculty in the system.

== Awards and recognition ==
In 2000, Ferrini-Mundy was the recipient of the Association for Women in Mathematics' Louise Hay Award.

In 2011, Ferrini-Mundy was elected as a Fellow at the American Association for the Advancement of Science She was elected to the 2018 class of fellows of the American Mathematical Society.

In 2022, Ferrini-Mundy was appointed to the President’s Committee on the National Medal of Science

In 2023, Ferrini-Mundy received the Lifetime Achievement Award from the National Council of Teachers of Mathematics. The award recognizes her service to the mathematics education community spanning multiple levels, state, regional, national, and international and go well beyond the responsibilities of her jobs.
