= Fort Kent, Maine =

Fort Kent, Maine Fort-Kent
- Town
- Ville de Fort-Kent (French)
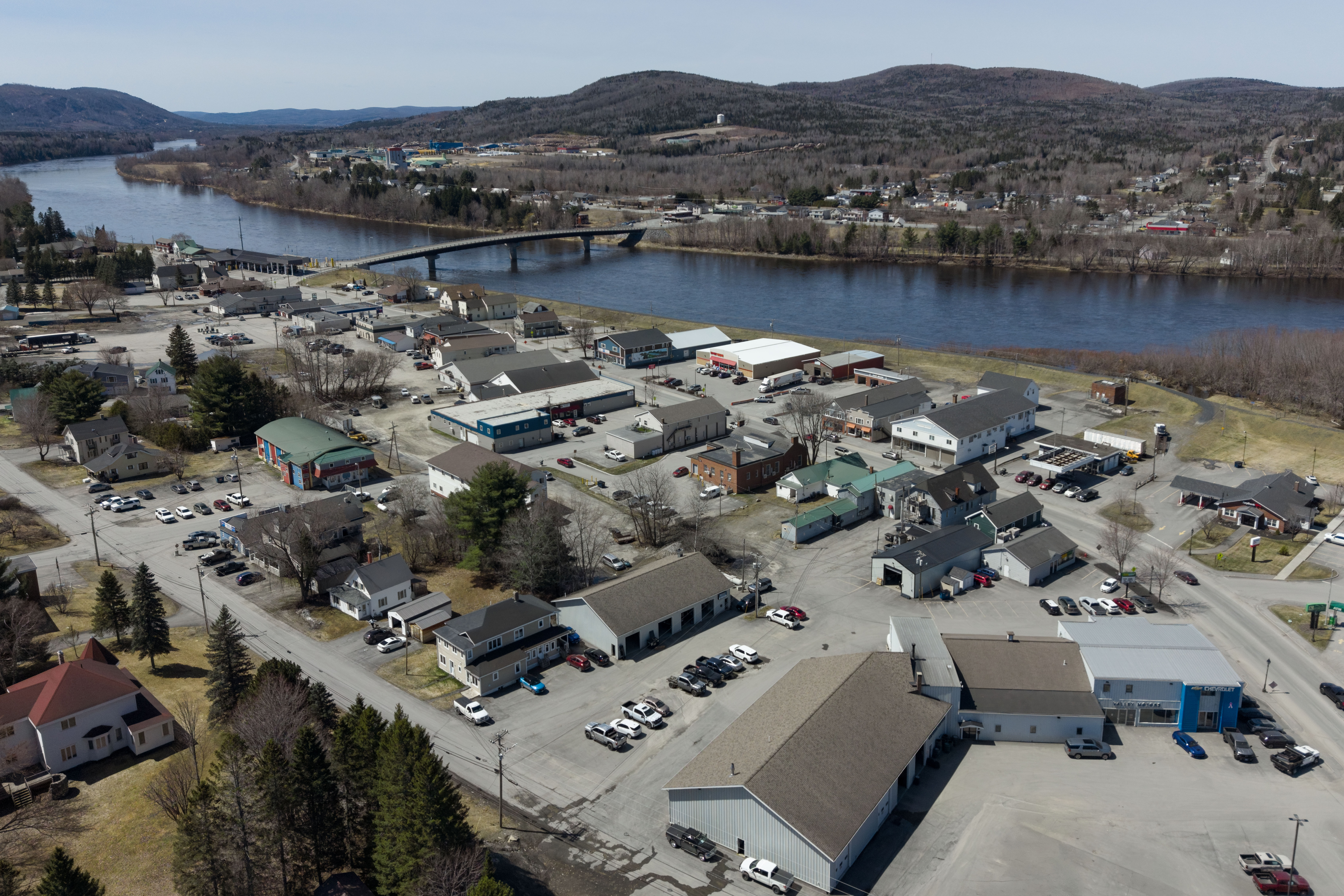
- Downtown
- Motto: The Little Town That Could
- Location of Fort Kent, Maine

- Location of Fort Kent in Maine Location of Fort Kent in the USA
- Coordinates: 47°14′31″N 68°34′20″W
- Country: United States
- State: Maine
- County: Aroostook
- Incorporated: February 23, 1869
- Villages: Fort Kent; Fort Kent Mills; Bradburys

Government
  - Type: Council-Manager
  - Town Manager: Suzie Paradis
  - Council Chair: Corey Pelletier

Area
  - Total: 55.15 sq mi (142.84 km^{2})
  - Land: 54.17 sq mi (140.30 km^{2})
  - Water: 0.98 sq mi (2.54 km^{2})
- Elevation: 663 ft (202 m)

Population (2020)
  - Total: 4,067
  - Density: 75/sq mi (29/km^{2})
- Time zone: UTC−5 (Eastern (EST))
  - Summer (DST): UTC−4 (EDT)
- ZIP Codes: 04743 (Fort Kent); 04744 (Fort Kent Mills)
- Area code: 207
- FIPS code: 23-25755
- GNIS feature ID: 582477
- Website: www.fortkent.org

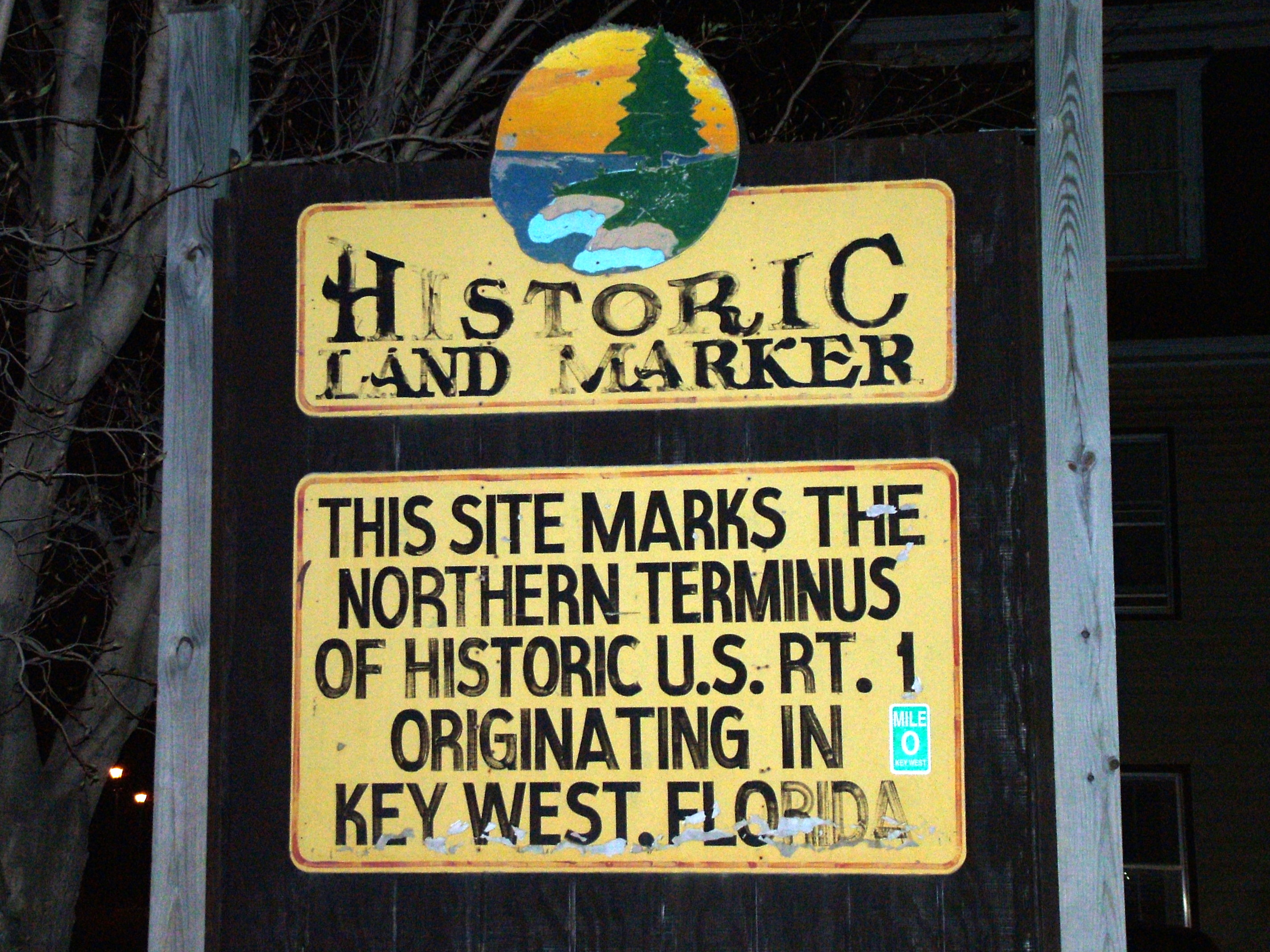
The monument marking the northern terminus of US Route 1

Fort Kent (French: Fort-Kent) is a town in Aroostook County, Maine, United States, surrounding a village of the same name situated at the confluence of the Fish River and the Saint John River, on the border with New Brunswick, Canada. The population was 4,067 in the 2020 census.

Fort Kent is home to an Olympic biathlete training center, an annual CAN-AM dogsled race, and the Fort Kent Blockhouse — built as a defensive bulwark during the Aroostook War, and in modern times designated a national historic site. Principal industries include agriculture (particularly potatoes and forestry) and textiles. Fort Kent is the northern terminus of U.S. 1 and the ending point of the Northern Forest Canoe Trail.

== History ==
Fort Kent was established in the summer of 1839 as an American border outpost. The blockhouse, the first structure built in what is the present-day village of Fort Kent, was named after then-governor of Maine Edward Kent. The Saint John River was a log driving route from upstream forests to downstream sawmills and paper mills until the Bangor and Aroostook Railroad and trucks began transporting pulpwood.

=== 2008 flooding ===
After receiving nearly 200 inches (510 cm) of snow during the 2007–2008 winter season, the Saint John River began to flood on April 29. Nearly two days of nonstop rain also contributed to the flooding. As the river rose, it poured into the downtown area. More than 600 of Fort Kent's 4,233 residents were evacuated. The river's water level rose to nearly 31 feet (9.4 m), which was 6 feet (1.8 m) above flood stage.

Governor John Baldacci declared a state of emergency for the region, flying from Augusta to see the damage first-hand. The Fish River did most of the damage, flooding St. Louis Catholic Church and an apartment building.

=== Relationship with French Canada ===
The town is economically and culturally linked to the Canadian towns of Clair and Saint-François-de-Madawaska, both in Madawaska County, New Brunswick, directly across the Saint John River. Most children on the Canadian side attend French-speaking school while their American counterparts are taught mainly in English.

According to the most recent American Community Survey data, up to 33.7% of the population age 5 and older speak French at home. The variety of French spoken in Fort Kent, and most of the Saint John River Valley, closely resembles the French spoken in Quebec and New Brunswick. It is referred to as New England French, "Valley French", or "Brayon". Many residents have American-Canadian dual citizenship.

== Geography ==
According to the United States Census Bureau, the town has a total area of 55.15 square miles (142.84 km^{2}), of which 54.17 square miles (140.30 km^{2}) is land and 0.98 square miles (2.54 km^{2}) is water.

Fort Kent is bordered by St. John Plantation to the west, the towns of Wallagrass and New Canada to the south, and the town of Frenchville to the east. The town's northern limits are delineated by the Saint John River, which forms the international boundary with Canada.

=== Climate ===
Fort Kent has a humid continental climate (Koppen: Dfb). There are four distinct seasons, with winter being the longest, typically beginning during November or late October and lasting well into April many years. Summers are very pleasant, with warm days and cool nights. Fort Kent receives a large amount of snowfall every year, averaging 97 inches (250 centimeters) of snowfall. The highest single day snowfall recorded is 20.4 in (52 cm), which took place on January 30, 1945. The highest snow depth recorded is 63 in (160 cm) and occurred on January 20, 1955. Temperature records range from −42 °F (−41 °C) on January 14–15, 1957 and February 20, 1966, to 98 °F (37 °C) on June 29, 1893. The coldest maximum recorded is −16 °F (−27 °C); this occurred on January 4, 1981. The warmest minimum recorded is 76 °F (24 °C), which occurred on June 20, 2024. On average, the last and first freeze dates are May 25 and September 21, giving Fort Kent an average growing season of 119 days.

Climate data for Fort Kent, Maine (1991–2020 normals, extremes 1893–present)
Month	Jan	Feb	Mar	Apr	May	Jun	Jul	Aug	Sep	Oct	Nov	Dec	Year
Record high °F (°C)	59 (15)	59 (15)	77 (25)	83 (28)	95 (35)	98 (37)	96 (36)	97 (36)	92 (33)	83 (28)	73 (23)	60 (16)	98 (37)
Mean maximum °F (°C)	41.0 (5.0)	41.9 (5.5)	52.3 (11.3)	67.3 (19.6)	81.1 (27.3)	87.0 (30.6)	88.0 (31.1)	86.7 (30.4)	81.7 (27.6)	71.1 (21.7)	58.7 (14.8)	45.6 (7.6)	90.2 (32.3)
Mean daily maximum °F (°C)	18.9 (−7.3)	22.6 (−5.2)	32.9 (0.5)	45.8 (7.7)	61.4 (16.3)	70.9 (21.6)	75.8 (24.3)	74.6 (23.7)	66.0 (18.9)	52.0 (11.1)	38.3 (3.5)	25.8 (−3.4)	48.7 (9.3)
Daily mean °F (°C)	7.9 (−13.4)	10.0 (−12.2)	20.9 (−6.2)	35.4 (1.9)	49.4 (9.7)	59.1 (15.1)	64.8 (18.2)	62.9 (17.2)	54.3 (12.4)	41.8 (5.4)	30.3 (−0.9)	17.0 (−8.3)	37.8 (3.2)
Mean daily minimum °F (°C)	−3.2 (−19.6)	−2.7 (−19.3)	9.0 (−12.8)	25.1 (−3.8)	37.4 (3.0)	47.3 (8.5)	53.7 (12.1)	51.2 (10.7)	42.7 (5.9)	31.7 (−0.2)	22.3 (−5.4)	8.1 (−13.3)	26.9 (−2.8)
Mean minimum °F (°C)	−24.4 (−31.3)	−23.0 (−30.6)	−15.5 (−26.4)	10.2 (−12.1)	26.0 (−3.3)	34.8 (1.6)	43.3 (6.3)	40.1 (4.5)	29.6 (−1.3)	19.3 (−7.1)	4.6 (−15.2)	−13.3 (−25.2)	−27.6 (−33.1)
Record low °F (°C)	−42 (−41)	−42 (−41)	−34 (−37)	−12 (−24)	17 (−8)	28 (−2)	33 (1)	31 (−1)	14 (−10)	7 (−14)	−14 (−26)	−33 (−36)	−42 (−41)
Average precipitation inches (mm)	2.78 (71)	2.34 (59)	2.75 (70)	3.17 (81)	3.31 (84)	4.42 (112)	4.52 (115)	3.73 (95)	3.72 (94)	4.26 (108)	3.23 (82)	3.38 (86)	41.61 (1,057)
Average snowfall inches (cm)	20.3 (52)	21.0 (53)	19.0 (48)	6.6 (17)	0.1 (0.25)	0.0 (0.0)	0.0 (0.0)	0.0 (0.0)	0.0 (0.0)	1.1 (2.8)	8.9 (23)	22.3 (57)	99.3 (252)
Average extreme snow depth inches (cm)	19.8 (50)	25.6 (65)	27.9 (71)	16.9 (43)	0.0 (0.0)	0.0 (0.0)	0.0 (0.0)	0.0 (0.0)	0.0 (0.0)	1.3 (3.3)	5.1 (13)	14.7 (37)	30.8 (78)
Average precipitation days (≥ 0.01 in)	13.4	11.2	10.9	11.7	14.0	13.7	15.1	13.2	12.4	13.7	12.6	13.7	155.6
Average snowy days (≥ 0.1 in)	9.0	8.0	6.9	2.7	0.2	0.0	0.0	0.0	0.0	0.6	4.3	8.6	40.3
Source: NOAA

== Demographics ==
=== 2020 census ===
As of the 2020 census, the total population was 4,067 people with 2,285 housing units and 1,952 families and living arrangements. The median age was 45.9 years.

Historical population
Census	Pop.	Note	%±
1870	1,034		—
1880	1,512		46.2%
1890	1,826		20.8%
1900	2,528		38.4%
1910	3,710		46.8%
1920	4,237		14.2%
1930	4,726		11.5%
1940	5,363		13.5%
1950	5,343		−0.4%
1960	4,761		−10.9%
1970	4,575		−3.9%
1980	4,826		5.5%
1990	4,268		−11.6%
2000	4,233		−0.8%
2010	4,097		−3.2%
2020	4,067		−0.7%
U.S. Decennial Census

=== 2010 census ===
As of the census of 2010, there were 4,097 people, 1,747 households, and 1,062 families living in the town. The population density was 75.6 inhabitants per square mile (29.2/km^{2}). There were 1,922 housing units at an average density of 35.5 units per square mile (13.7 units/km^{2}). The racial makeup of the town was 94.9% White, 0.8% African American, 0.8% Native American, 0.7% Asian, 0.1% from other races, and 2.7% from two or more races. Hispanic or Latino of any race were 0.7% of the population.

There were 1,747 households, of which 25.8% had children under the age of 18 living with them, 49.5% were married couples living together, 8.0% had a female householder with no husband present, 3.4% had a male householder with no wife present, and 39.2% were non-families. 31.4% of all households were made up of individuals, and 13.6% had someone living alone who was 65 years of age or older. The average household size was 2.23 and the average family size was 2.83.

The median age in the town was 42.7 years. Of residents 19.9% were under the age of 18; 12.3% were between the ages of 18 and 24; 20.7% were from 25 to 44; 29.5% were from 45 to 64; and 17.6% were 65 years of age or older. The gender makeup of the town was 48.0% male and 52.0% female.

=== 2000 census ===
Languages (2000)	Percent
Spoke French at home	63.24%
Spoke English at home	36.76%

As of the census of 2000, there were 4,233 people, 1,735 households, and 1,106 families living in the town. The population density was 78.2 inhabitants per square mile (30.2/km^{2}). There were 1,824 housing units at an average density of 33.7 units per square mile (13.0 units/km^{2}). The racial makeup of the town was 96.95% White, 0.38% Black or African American, 0.76% Native American, 0.87% Asian, 0.28% from other races, and 0.76% from two or more races. Hispanic or Latino of any race were 0.50% of the population.

There were 1,735 households, out of which 28.2% had children under the age of 18 living with them, 54.0% were married couples living together, 6.7% had a female householder with no husband present, and 36.2% were non-families. Of all households 29.3% were made up of individuals, and 13.0% had someone living alone who was 65 years of age or older. The average household size was 2.34 and the average family size was 2.90.

In the town, the population was spread out, with 22.3% under the age of 18, 11.3% from 18 to 24, 26.9% from 25 to 44, 24.0% from 45 to 64, and 15.5% who were 65 years of age or older. The median age was 38 years. For every 100 females, there were 96.3 males. For every 100 females age 18 and over, there were 91.7 males.

The median income for a household in the town was $29,547, and the median income for a family was $41,616. Males had a median income of $35,325 versus $19,146 for females. The per capita income for the town was $16,403. About 9.5% of families and 14.5% of the population were below the poverty line, including 13.7% of those under age 18 and 18.2% of those age 65 or over.

== Arts and culture ==
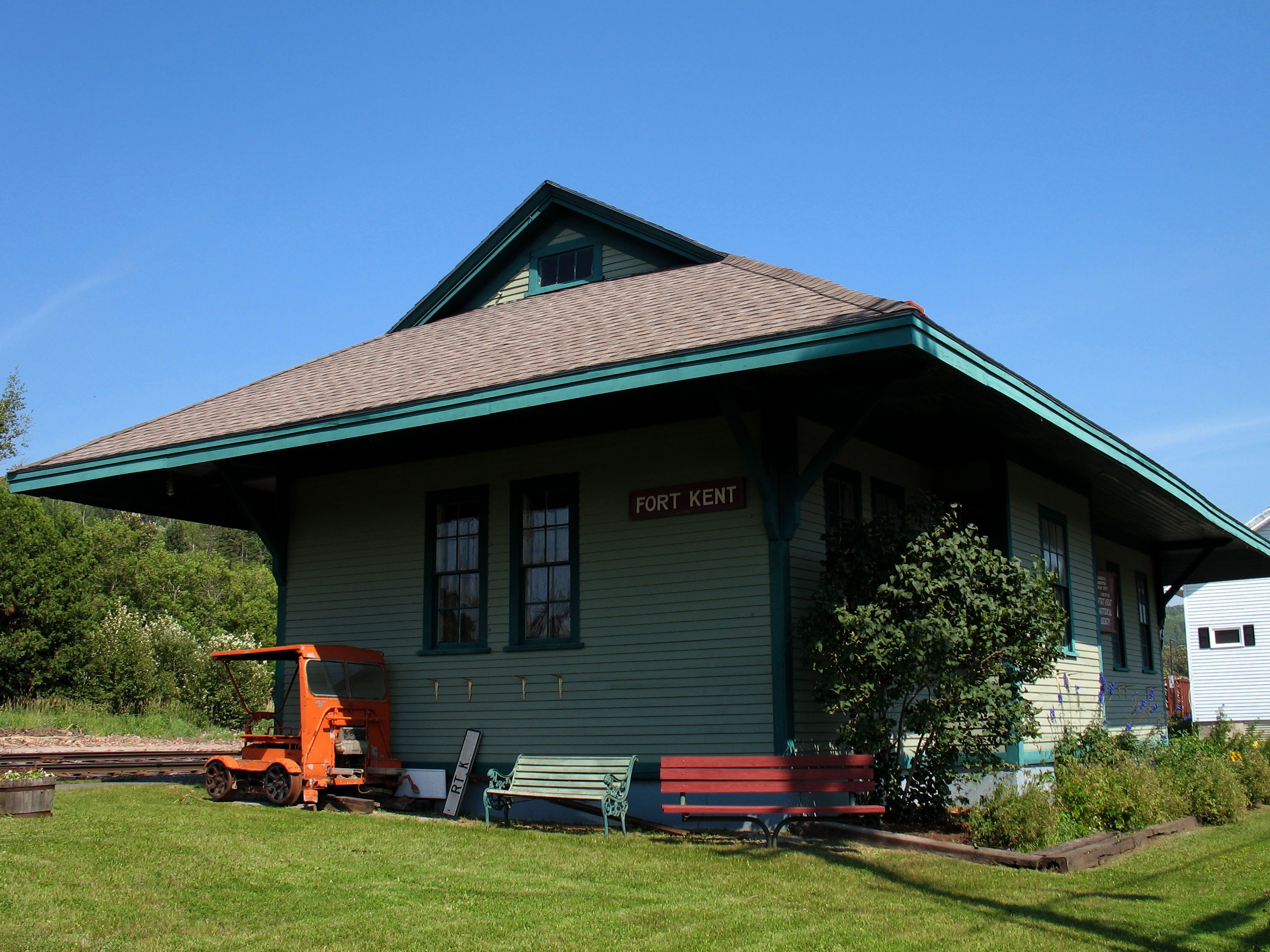
The Fort Kent Railroad Station is listed on the National Register of Historic Places

=== International Muskie Derby ===
Fort Kent is home to the International Muskie Fishing Derby. The Derby was started in 2003 to provide a platform to showcase the new fishery and continues today. It has brought attention to the new fishery and helped bring attention to national TV shows such as ESPN 2's Beat Charlie Moore. This show and other future shows will help showcase the fishery to not only potential derby contestants but for a more secure and expanded tourist based fishery. The St John Watershed is a unique muskie habitat. Several factors make it acceptable and necessary to remove some fish from the ecosystem for the fishery to remain healthy.

=== Ploye Festival ===
Along with the Muskie Derby is the Fort Kent Ploye Festival, one of the featured events is the making of the world's largest ploye. This event attracts hundreds of spectators, making it the highlight of the Ploye Festival. The massive ploye, which thus far, measures 12 feet in diameter, can only be accomplished with the help of friends and family of Bouchard Family Farm, producers of the ploye mix. It requires approximately fifteen bags of charcoal to ready the metal pan to the accurate temperature in order for the ploye to be cooked to perfection. It also needs about fifty pounds of ploye mix, much water (which is then mixed in five-gallon pails) and plenty of muscle to stir the mix. Five people are required to transport the mix from the pails to the awaiting pre-heated pan and also four people to spread the mix out as fast as possible. The thin batter cooks quickly, so time is of the essence. Once cooked, the enormous pan is then removed from the coals, and the ploye is taken off with huge spatulas. Pieces of the giant ploye are then plopped onto large trays and brought to nearby tables where they can be buttered with brushes, and distributed to the eagerly awaiting crowd.

=== World Cup IBU ===
The Fort Kent Outdoor Center (previously known as 10th Mountain) has hosted a multitude of World Cup biathlon events, including the largest events in 2004 and 2011, where racers from around the globe took part in various biathlon events in Fort Kent. During the 2011 World Cup Biathlon, Chicago Bulls superstar Scottie Pippen visited Fort Kent to witness the race. 2010–11 Biathlon World Cup – World Cup 8

=== World Acadian Congress ===
Northern Maine and parts of New Brunswick and Quebec participated in the World Acadian Congress to celebrate the rich Acadians history of the area in 2014. Multiple family reunions and events took place during the time, including concerts, parades, and festivals.

=== Can Am Crown International Sled Dog Race ===
The Can-Am Crown International Sled Dog Race was first held on Tuesday, February 16, 1993. Nine teams from Maine, Ontario, Quebec, and New Brunswick competed in that race. In 1994 sixteen teams competed in the 250-mile race and eleven in the newly introduced 60-mile race. In 1997 a 30-mile race was added to the itinerary. That same year, the first Saturday in March was established as the official start date for all three races. The race begins on Main Street in Fort Kent, sloping underneath the international bridge to Canada, then extending into the western parts of the Allagash wilderness, and finishes back in Fort Kent. Three races are part of the CAN-AM Crown, consisting of a 30-mile, 100 mile, and an Iditarod Trail Sled Dog Race qualifying 250 mile race.

== Education ==
Fort Kent is served by Maine School Administrative District 27. Schools in the town include Fort Kent Elementary School, Valley Rivers Middle School and Fort Kent Community High School.

The town is home to the campus of the University of Maine at Fort Kent.

== Infrastructure ==
=== Transportation ===
U.S. Route 1 begins in Fort Kent near the Clair–Fort Kent Bridge, continues 2,369 miles (3,813 km), and ends in Key West, Florida.

Fort Kent signed a lease agreement with the Fish River Flying Club on July 8, 2011, to repair, maintain, and operate the local municipal airport, which had been closed since the 1980s.

== Notable people ==
- Benjamin Collings (born 1976), politician
- Lucien Daigle, politician
- Mike Daisey (born 1976), monologist, author, and actor
- George Farson (1939–2010), professional minor league baseball player, manager, coach, and scout
- Clair Goodblood (1929–1951), soldier in the U.S. Army during the Korean War, recipient of the Medal of Honor
- Helen Hamlin (1917–2004), author
- Troy Jackson (born 1968), politician
- Ellis Paul (born 1965), singer-songwriter
- Sam Pelletier (born 1957), distance runner
- Dora Pinkham (1891–1941), politician
- Austin Theriault (born 1994), NASCAR driver and politician
- Raynold Theriault (1936–2015), politician
- Don Voisine (born 1952), abstract painter
