= Chad Finn =

Sports writer

Chad Finn is a sports writer for the Boston Globe and Boston.com. He is the Globe's sports media columnist and a general sports columnist for Boston.com. He often appears as a guest on New England sports and talk radio programs, such as The Big JAB. He founded the Touching All the Bases blog in December 2004.

== Education and work history ==
Finn, a graduate of Morse High School in Bath, Maine, studied journalism at the University of Maine from 1988 through 1993. While at the university he worked at The Maine Campus newspaper as sports editor. From 1994-December 2003 he worked as assistant sports editor at the Concord Monitor in Concord, New Hampshire. In 1999 while at the Concord Monitor he began writing an award winning sports column. Finn began writing and reporting for the Boston Globe's online newspaper in August 2008. In 2009 he became a sports media columnist for the paper.

== Touching All the Bases ==
Touching All the Bases is a blog created by Finn in December 2004. It began as a personal blog inspired by the Red Sox' 2004 world championship. It became incorporated into Boston.com as part of the sports section in 2008. Finn remains the sole contributor to the blog. Through the blog he hosts live chats centered around significant games and/or events in the New England sports community and the sporting world in general.

== Notable career highlights ==
While working for the Maine Campus in 1992-1993 he covered the winning season for the Maine Black Bears who went 42-1-2 for the season. In 2000 Chad Finn finished third in the National Associated Press Sports Editor's Contest for column writing. While working for the Concord Monitor he received multiple awards for writing and page design. He wrote a weekly column for Fox Sports (USA) in 2008. He has been the writer for every edition of Maple Street Press's Boston Red Sox annuals as well as editor of the New England Patriots annuals for 2009-2010. He has contributed as a guest columnist at Baseball Prospectus multiple times. He wrote a profile on Ellis Burks for the e-book Hall of Nearly Great, which featured writers such as Joe Posnanski, Rob Neyer and Jonah Keri. In 2010 he contributed to an APSE winning writing project on the defensive metrics in baseball. In 2012 and '13, Touching All the Bases was the runner-up in editor and Publisher's best sports blog category of the Eppy awards. His blog finished second to Grantland and theMMQB.com respectively.
