= The Gunslinger (novella) =

Short story by Stephen King

- Author: Stephen King
- Language: English
- Series: The Dark Tower
- Genre: Fantasy
- Published in: The Magazine of Fantasy and Science Fiction
- Publisher: Mercury Press
- Publication date: October 1978
- Publication place: United States
- Media type: Print (Magazine)
- Preceded by: The Little Sisters of Eluria
- Followed by: The Way Station

The Gunslinger is a fantasy novella by American writer Stephen King, originally published in The Magazine of Fantasy and Science Fiction in October 1978.

In 1982, "The Gunslinger" was collected with four other stories King published in The Magazine of Fantasy and Science Fiction as The Dark Tower: The Gunslinger. "The Gunslinger" formed the first chapter of the book, and was slightly revised for the inclusion. The larger work eventually became the first work in King's Dark Tower Septology.

== Plot summary ==
The story begins with the sentence, "The man in black fled across the desert, and the gunslinger followed." The gunslinger comes across a hut in the desert owned by a farmer named Brown, who has a pet raven named Zoltan. The gunslinger stays the night and, at Brown's urging, tells him the story of what happened to him the last time he came across people.

He had been traveling through Tull, the last town before the desert began. He made his way to the local saloon and learned from Allie, its bartender, that the town drunk Nort had died from eating narcotic devil-grass. The man in black (calling himself "Walter O'Dim") brought Nort back to life and told Allie that if she said the word "nineteen" to Nort, he would tell her everything he saw and heard during his time in the afterlife. Sensing that Walter had laid a trap for both him and Allie, the gunslinger warned her never to say the word in Nort's hearing.

He next met and interrogated Sylvia Pittston, a fanatical preacher who believed that the man in black had impregnated her with the offspring of the Crimson King. She warned her congregation to beware of the gunslinger, referring to him as a malicious "Interloper," and eventually stirred the entire town to attack him. Even Allie joined the mob, having fallen into Walter's trap and gone insane from Nort's revelations. The gunslinger killed all 58 residents of Tull, found that Nort had already died again, then headed out into the desert.

After telling Brown his story, the gunslinger fills his water skins and continues across the desert, in pursuit of his quarry.

Among other minor additions and deletions made by King for the 2003 revised version of the novella, the word "parsecs" in the opening paragraph was changed to "eternity," and the story of Tull is expanded by King to include an additional exchange between Allie and Walter.

== See also ==
- Short fiction by Stephen King
- Slade – Short story by Stephen King
