= Clair Goodblood =

American soldier

- Medal of Honor recipient
- Born: September 18, 1929; Fort Kent, Maine, U.S.
- Died: April 25, 1951 (aged 21) near Popsu-dong, Korea
- Burial place: Chandler Cemetery, Burnham, Maine
- Military career
- Allegiance: United States
- Branch: United States Army
- Service years: 1947–1951
- Rank: Corporal
- Units: Company D, 7th Infantry Regiment, 3rd Infantry Division
- Conflicts: Korean War †
- Awards: Medal of Honor; Purple Heart

Clair Goodblood (September 18, 1929 – April 25, 1951) was a soldier in the U.S. Army during the Korean War. He posthumously received the Medal of Honor for his actions on 24–25 April 1951.

Goodblood joined the Army from Burnham, Maine in 1947.

== Medal of Honor citation ==
Rank and organization: Corporal, U.S. Army, Company D, 7th Infantry Regiment, 3rd Infantry Division

Place and date: Near Popsu-dong, Korea, 24 and April 25, 1951

Entered service at: Burnham, Maine. Born: September 18, 1929, Fort Kent, Maine

G.O. No.: 14, February 1, 1952

Citation:

Cpl. Goodblood, a member of Company D, distinguished himself by conspicuous gallantry and intrepidity at the risk of his life above and beyond the call of duty in action against an armed enemy of the United Nations. Cpl. Goodblood, a machine gunner, was attached to Company B in defensive positions on thickly wooded key terrain under attack by a ruthless foe. In bitter fighting which ensued, the numerically superior enemy infiltrated the perimeter, rendering the friendly positions untenable. Upon order to move back, Cpl. Goodblood voluntarily remained to cover the withdrawal and, constantly vulnerable to heavy fire, inflicted withering destruction on the assaulting force. Seeing a grenade lobbed at his position, he shoved his assistant to the ground and flinging himself upon the soldier attempted to shield him. Despite his valorous act both men were wounded. Rejecting aid for himself, he ordered the ammunition bearer to evacuate the injured man for medical treatment. He fearlessly maintained his l-man defense, sweeping the onrushing assailants with fire until an enemy banzai charge carried the hill and silenced his gun. When friendly elements regained the commanding ground, Cpl. Goodblood's body was found lying beside his gun and approximately 100 hostile dead lay in the wake of his field of fire. Through his unflinching courage and willing self-sacrifice the onslaught was retarded, enabling his unit to withdraw, regroup, and resecure the strongpoint. Cpl. Goodblood's inspirational conduct and devotion to duty reflect lasting glory on himself and are in keeping with the noble traditions of the military service.

== See also ==
- List of Medal of Honor recipients
- List of Korean War Medal of Honor recipients
