= Slade (short story) =

Short story by Stephen King

- Short story by Stephen King
- Country: United States
- Language: English
- Genre: Western parody

Publication
- Published in: The Maine Campus
- Publication type: Serial short story
- Publication date: June 11–August 6, 1970

Chronology
Graveyard Shift (in Night Shift)	The Blue Air Compressor (unpublished)

"Slade" is an early short story (about 5,200 words) by Stephen King. In 1970, he originally published it in eight installments in the student newspaper The Maine Campus. It's a Western parody about gunslinger Jack Slade, who protects a damsel in distress against some outlaws.

== Story ==
Gunslinger Jack Slade comes to Dead Steer Springs, called by Sandra Dawson, whose farm is threatened by the outlaw Sam Columbine, who wants to sell the land to the railroad. But in fact, everything is a sham; Sandra turns out to be Slade's ex-girlfriend – whom he believes dead. She couldn't get along with Slade anymore and conspired with Columbine to kill Slade. However, neither considered that Slade is prone to wearing bulletproof blue underwear (with nice flowers). Slade, playing possum after a duel, shoots both conspirators. Then he needs a joint before setting out for future adventures.

== Connections to The Dark Tower ==
Even though Slade is, of course, a much shallower and most of all much less serious character than King's later creation Roland Deschain, Slade can be considered a first test run for the famous gunslinger:

- Like Slade, Roland pines for his lost love (Susan Delgado).
- Both smoke whenever possible.
- Both always hit what they shoot at.
- Both only speak when necessary and are used to journeying alone.
- Like the gunslingers in The Dark Tower (see especially Wolves of the Calla), Slade feels the obligation to help if called upon.

== Publication ==
The short story was originally published by The Maine Campus in eight installments, from June 11 to August 6, 1970.

According to the 1998 book Stephen King from A to Z: "It will never be issued because King considers it juvenilia and has steadfastly refused all attempts to bring it back into print, to the point of having his lawyer write a litigious letter when The Maine Campus considered reprinting it, along with King's nonfiction columns, in a book for fund-raising purposes."

== See also ==
- Stephen King short fiction bibliography
- The Gunslinger – Short story by Stephen King
