= Charles Frederick Allen =

American theologian and university president

1st President of the Maine State College
- In office 1871–1878
- Preceded by: Board of Trustees
- Succeeded by: Merritt Caldwell Fernald

Personal details
- Born: January 28, 1816 Norridgewock, Maine
- Died: February 9, 1899 (aged 83) Portland, Maine
- Education: Bowdoin College; Wesleyan University
- Profession: academic administrator, theologian
- Website: Maine.edu

Charles Frederick Allen (January 28, 1816 – February 9, 1899) was an American Methodist theologian and university president from Maine. In 1872, he earned a Doctorate of Divinity from Bowdoin College and Wesleyan University. He was the first president of Maine State College (1871–1878). During his time as President, the college's enrollment increased from 17 to 102. He left the institution in 1878 in order to return to the ministry. He served as a Presiding Elder for three years.
