= Robert Judson Aley =

American mathematician, academic administrator (1863–1935)

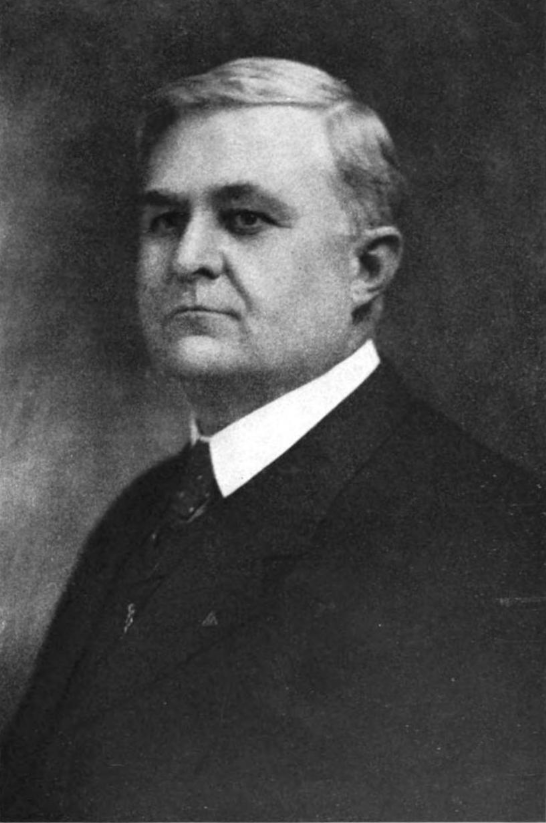

5th President of the University of Maine
- In office 1911–1921
- Preceded by: Board of Trustees
- Succeeded by: Harold Boardman

11th President of the Butler University
- In office 1921–1931
- Preceded by: James W. Putnam
- Succeeded by: Walter S. Athearn

Personal details
- Born: May 11, 1863 Coal City, Indiana, U.S.
- Died: July 1, 1935 (aged 72) New York City, New York, U.S.
- Education: Valparaiso University (BA); Indiana University Bloomington (BA, MA); Stanford University, University of Pennsylvania (PhD)
- Profession: Academic administrator, schoolteacher

Robert Judson Aley (May 11, 1863 – July 1, 1935) was an American mathematician, academic administrator, teacher, and university president. Aley served as the fifth President of the University of Maine from January 1911 to August 1921 and then as President of Butler College in Indianapolis, Indiana, from 1921 to 1931.

== Education and early career ==
Robert Judson Aley was born on May 11, 1863, in Coal City, Indiana. He attended public schools.

Aley began his teaching career at the age of 14. After three years of teaching in rural schools, he attended and eventually graduated from Valparaiso University (Bachelor of Science, 1882). He worked as a Principal in Spencer, Indiana, after leaving Valparaiso while also studying for a Bachelor of Arts from Indiana University.

He earned two degrees from Indiana: a BA degree in 1888 and a Master of Arts in 1890. He was the first person to receive a degree in mathematics from Indiana University. He became a professor of mathematics at Vincennes University in 1888 until 1891. He was hired as head of the mathematics department at Indiana in 1891 and continued in that position until 1909. During that period, he did graduate work at Stanford University and earned a PhD in mathematics from the University of Pennsylvania in 1897.

== Maine ==
Aley became the 5th President of the University of Maine in Orono, Maine, in January 1911. A fervent supporter of United States involvement in World War I, he made attendance mandatory for pro-war events in and near the campus.

On April 19, 1919, during the Red Summer, an incident took place at night at Hannibal Hamlin Hall, University of Maine, in which two African American students and brothers, Samuel E. Courtney Jr. (1897–1929) and Roger Davis Courtney (1901–1930), were tarred and feathered by a white mob. The event was described by President Aley as a hazing event and not race related. Both of the Courtney brothers transferred to other universities as a result.

== Death ==
Aley died of pneumonia in 1935 at the age of 72, in his home in New York City.
