= Daniel H. Sandweiss =

American archaeologist

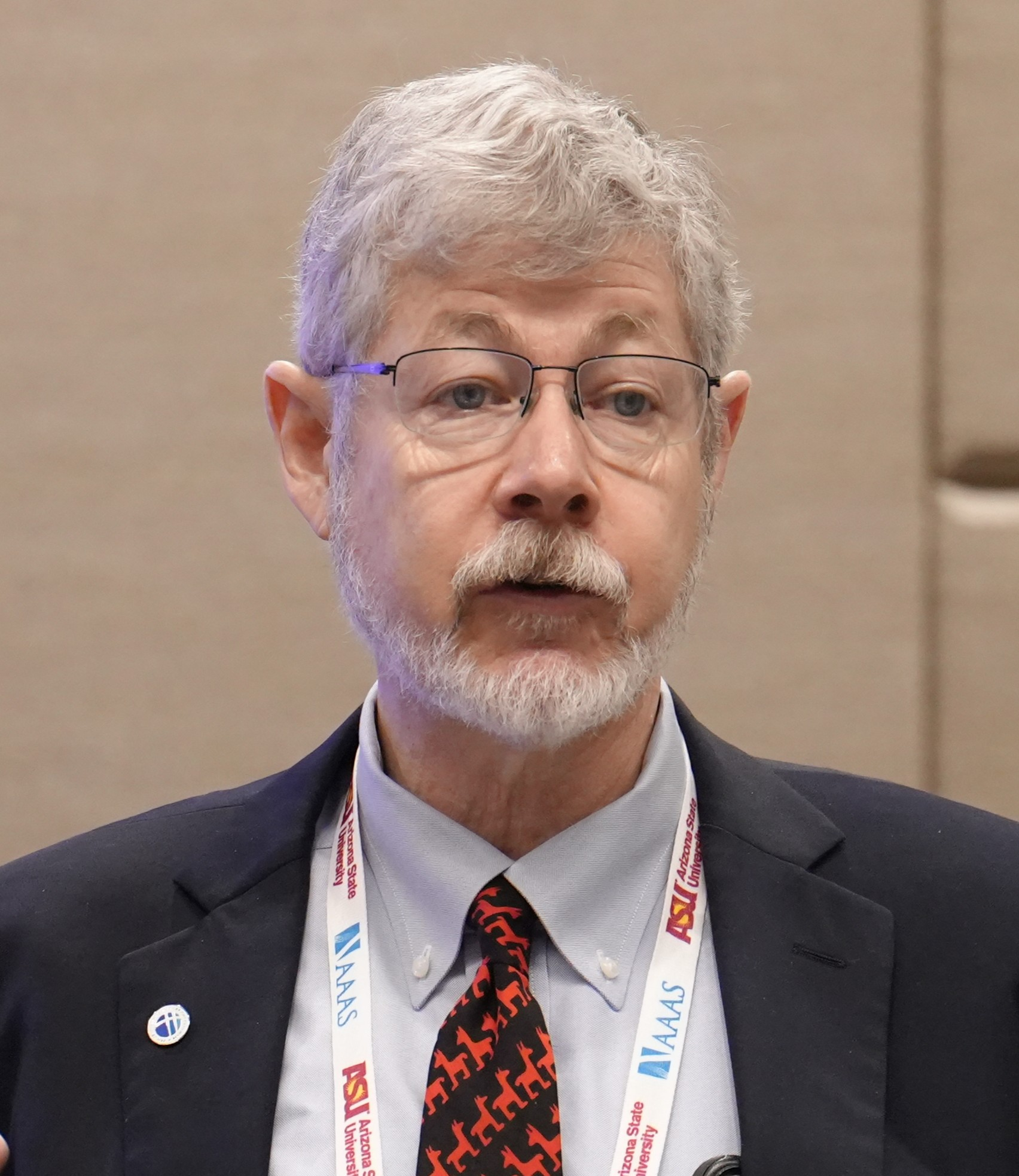
- Sandweiss in 2026
- Occupation: Archaeologist

Academic background
- Education: Yale University Cornell University
- Doctoral advisor: Thomas F. Lynch

Academic work
- Discipline: Archaeologist and anthropologist
- Sub-discipline: geoarchaeology
- Institutions: University of Maine

Daniel H. Sandweiss is an American archaeologist and geoarchaeologist who has published extensively on climate change and maritime adaptations in Latin America, particularly the prehistory of the El Niño/Southern Oscillation.

Sandweiss earned his B.A. from Yale University in 1979. He completed graduate studies at Cornell University, where he received an M.A. in 1983 and a Ph.D. in 1989. He is a professor of anthropology and quaternary and climate studies in the Department of Anthropology at the University of Maine, Orono.

Sandweiss has worked extensively in coastal Peru. From 1989 to 1991, he collaborated with Norwegian anthropologist and adventurer Thor Heyerdahl to lead excavations at Túcume, a major pyramid center on the Peruvian north coast. His work on coastal sand dunes suggested Spanish colonization permanently altered Peruvian coastal shorelines. Sandweiss' research has also revealed some of the earliest human occupations of South America. He has dated the site of Quebrada Jaguay, on the Peruvian south coast, to 13,000–11,000 years BP. Additional research at high elevation sites has revealed early human occupations between 12,800 and 11,500 year BP.

He founded the Northeast Conference on Andean and Amazonian Archaeology and Ethnohistory in 1982, in order to provide an accessible venue to report Andean research on the east coast. In 1987, he founded the peer-reviewed publication series Andean Past and remains a member of its editorial board. In 1993, he was the first American to conduct archaeological research in Cuba after the Cuban Revolution.

Sandweiss served as president of the Society for American Archaeology from 2022 to 2025. Previously, he served as president of the Phi Kappa Phi Honors Society. He was elected to the National Academy of Sciences in 2024.

== Major publications ==
- Heyerdahl, Sandweiss, D.H., A. Narváez (1995). The Pyramids of Túcume: The Quest for Peru's Forgotten City. Thames & Hudson, London.
- Sandweiss, D.H., H. McInnis, R.L. Burger, A. Cano, B. Ojeda, R. Paredes, M.C. Sandweiss, and M.D. Glascock (1998). "Quebrada Jaguay: Early South American Maritime Adaptations." Science281:1830-1832.
- Prieto, G. and D.H. Sandweiss, editors (2020) Maritime Communities of the Ancient Andes. University Press of Florida.
- Rick, T.C. and D.H. Sandweiss (2020) Archaeology, Climate, and Global Change in the Age of Humans. Proceedings of the National Academy of Sciences 117(15):8250-8253.
- Sandweiss, D.H. and K.A. Maasch (2022) Climatic and Cultural Transitions in Lambayeque, Peru, 600 to 1540 AD: Medieval Warm Period to the Spanish Conquest. Geosciences 12: doi.org/10.3390/geosciences12060238.
