= Sam Pelletier =

American distance runner (born 1957)

Personal information
- Born: 14 October 1957 (age 68) Fort Kent, Maine, United States

Sport
- Country: United States
- Events: Marathon, half marathon
- College team: University of Maine

Achievements and titles
- Personal bests: Marathon: 2:15:27; Half Marathon: 1:04:31; 10 miles: 49:22

Sam Pelletier (born October 14, 1957) is a retired American distance runner. He competed in the U.S. Olympic Trials marathon in 1984 and 1988 and won the 1983 Philadelphia Marathon. Pelletier held the record for the fastest marathon by a Maine native for 38 years. He was inducted into the Maine Running Hall of Fame in 1997.

== Early life ==
Pelletier grew up in Fort Kent, Maine and attended Fort Kent Community High School, graduating in 1975. He placed ninth at the 1974 Maine Class A Cross Country Championship. Pelletier enrolled at the University of Maine, where he ran cross country and distance events on the track.

== Career ==
While in medical school in Philadelphia, Pelletier began running over 100 miles per week. He recorded a 2:22 time at the 1981 Philadelphia Marathon and he improved to 2:16 in 1982. The following year, Pelletier won the race in 2:15:26. This was the fastest marathon ever recorded by a Maine native until Ben True ran 2:12:53 at the 2021 New York City Marathon.

From 1983 to 1987, Pelletier served in the Army and was based in California. He competed in the 1984 U.S. Olympic Trials marathon, but he was unable to finish. His best half marathon came at the Philadelphia Distance Run where he clocked a 1:04:31 to place tenth.

Pelletier competed for the Army in international cross country races through 1987. He again qualified for the U.S. Olympic Trials marathon in 1988 before stepping away from racing to focus on his medical career.

Pelletier was inducted into the Maine Running Hall of Fame in 1997.

== Personal ==
Pelletier is a practicing optometrist in York, Maine. He and his wife, Sue, have four adult children and several grandchildren.
