= John Franklin Witter =

- Born: June 11th 1906; Frederick, Maryland
- Died: September 29 1982 (aged 76)
- Occupation(s): Veterinarian, Professor
- Spouse: Verna Church (m. 1933)

John Franklin Witter (1906-1982) was a veterinarian specialist in avian medicine as well as a researcher and professor at the University of Maine, Orono.

== Early life ==
Frank Witter was born on June 11, 1906, in Frederick, Maryland, the eighth of nine children. His parents were Harry and “Jennie” (Mary Catherine Virginia) Miller Witter. He was raised on a farm, and his father was a professional livestock showman. In his early life, Witter learned about different breeds of farm animals and later said that he saw farming as "a way of life".

== Education ==
Witter enrolled at the University of Maryland in College Park in the fall of 1924, earning his Bachelor of Science in Agriculture in 1928. In 1929, he enrolled in the veterinary school at Michigan State College in East Lansing.

== Career ==
Upon graduating in 1932 Witter was immediately offered a faculty position at the University of Maine, eventually becoming the head of the newly created Department of Animal Pathology in 1953. As a faculty member, he published many papers on poultry health and pathology. He served as president and secretary-treasurer of the Maine Veterinary Medical Association. He retired in 1971.

== Family life ==
Dr. John Franklin Witter met Verna Church during his years at Michigan State through a professor. They had a strong friendship. Verna graduated from Michigan State with a master's and bachelor's in mathematics and lived in East Lansing. Their friendship strengthened, and they married on July 1, 1933. In 1936, they had a son, Richard Lawrence Witter.

== Later years and death ==
The new J. Franklin Witter Animal Science Center was named in his honor in 1974, as well as one of the Orono-Old Town Kiwanis Club auction barns. Witter died on September 29, 1982.
