= The Maine Campus =

University of Maine student newspaper

- The October 19, 2009, front page of The Maine Campus
- Type: Student newspaper
- Editor-in-chief: Elora Griswold
- News editor: Izzi Stubbs
- Opinion editor: Joe Lazaro
- Staff writers: 30
- Founded: 1875; 151 years ago
- Political alignment: None
- Language: English
- Headquarters: 5748 Memorial Union; Orono, Maine 04469-5748; United States
- Circulation: 1,500
- Price: Free
- Website: MaineCampus.com

The Maine Campus is a weekly newspaper produced by the students of the University of Maine in the United States. It covers university and Town of Orono events, and has four sections: News, Opinion, Culture and Sports. It serves the 20,000 students, faculty and staff of the university. Founded in 1875, it is one of the oldest surviving papers in Maine. Only The Bowdoin Orient, founded in 1871, The Bates Student, founded in 1873, and the Sun Journal, founded in 1847, are older.

== Circulation and distribution ==
Approximately 500 copies of the Campus are printed every issue. Since 2024, the Campus published a magazine-style full-color edition on the first of the month until fall of 2025, when the paper then switched to a weekly print edition as well as weekly online articles.

The Campus has been online since the late 1990s. On April Fool's Day the Campus runs a satirical edition named The Maine Krampus.

== History and organization ==
The cover of an early copy of The Maine Campus from 1912

The Maine Campus has existed since 1875, and has at various times been a weekly, daily and semiweekly paper. The Crucible was the first student newspaper at the University of Maine, established in 1873, which was replaced by the College Reporter. The Reporter became The Cadet, which was published monthly from 1855–1899. It then continued as The Campus, until changing its name to The Maine Campus on June 1, 1904. By the time it became The Maine Campus, it was publishing semimonthly, and by 1912 it was published weekly. It became The Daily Maine Campus (Monday through Friday) in 1979 under editor Dan Warren. It remained a daily newspaper, peaking at 5,000 circulation through the 1980s, under editors Tammy Eaves, Steve McGrath, Stephen Olver and Ernie Clark. In 1990 it changed from a daily newspaper to a thrice-weekly newspaper, and has since become weekly.

The Campus is a direct-funded student organization, meaning it is an independent company that receives money directly from the school and is not under the purview of student government. However, the paper has, on several occasions, required financial assistance and bailout from the student government (notably in 2002–2003). The Campus is partially funded through the communications fee, and partially through ad sales. The paper is editorially independent of the university.

The newspaper is run by the editor in chief and the business manager. The editor in chief makes all content decisions and is the public face of the newspaper, while the business manager has final say on business decisions. The paper also has a board composed of the editor in chief, news editor, Web editor, sports editor, production manager, style editor, photography editor, opinion editor, and head copy editor. Unlike many other college newspapers, the Campus does not have any non-student employees.

In fall 2009, The Maine Campus switched from tabloid format to broadsheet. In 2011, the paper began a partnership with the Bangor Daily News to provide training, web hosting and development services for the paper, as well as a content-sharing agreement aimed at promoting the best in student journalism in Maine. In 2012, the paper switched from twice-weekly publication to a once-weekly Monday paper.

== Notable alumni ==
Stephen King wrote a weekly column for the Campus in the 1970s and also published short stories such as Slade in the newspaper. According to Haunted Heart by Lisa Rogak:

After writing a few articles and essays for The Maine Campus, Steve decided to approach the editor, David Bright, about writing a weekly column. Bright gave him the go-ahead, and his first column appeared on February 20, 1969. Steve christened his column "The Garbage Truck" because, as he put it, "You never know what you're going to find in a garbage truck." From the beginning, Bright liked Steve's writing, but he wasn't overly fond of the nerve-racking style in which Steve cranked out his columns. An hour before the deadline with no column in sight, Steve would show up at the paper's office. Bright, wringing his hands, would tell Steve how many column inches he needed to fill for that issue. Steve would then sit down at one of the big, hulking green typewriters in the newspaper office and bang out his copy, letter-perfect with no cross-outs, no corrections, no crumpled-up pieces of paper, and meet his deadline with moments to spare.

King's columns were often controversial and were popular in the community, even garnering the attention of then-President Winthrop Libby, but neither his columns nor his short stories have ever been republished. According to Stephen King from A to Z:

('Slade') will never be issued because King considers it juvenilia and has steadfastly refused all attempts to bring it back into print, to the point of having his lawyer write a litigious letter when The Maine Campus considered reprinting it, along with King's nonfiction columns, in a book for fund-raising purposes.
