= Susan J. Hunter =

Susan J. Hunter is an American academic and the 20th president of the University of Maine in Orono, Maine. She was the first woman president of the University of Maine since its founding in 1865. She took office on July 7, 2014, following the departure of then-president Paul Ferguson. She remained in the position until June 30, 2018.

== Background ==
Hunter is a cell biologist by training. She earned her undergraduate degree in biology from James Madison University and a Ph.D. in physiology from Pennsylvania State University. She did postdoctoral work both at Case Western Reserve University and at Pennsylvania State University. She started her career at the University of Maine in 1991 as part of the faculty in the Department of Biological Sciences.

== Awards and recognition ==
IN 2016, she was inducted into the Deborah Morton Society at the University of New England. In 2017, she received the Wilma Award from the Collins Center for the Arts at the University of Maine. In 2017, she received the Kenneth M. Curtis Leadership Award from the Maine Development Foundation and in 2018 she was honored with the Catherine Lebowitz Award for Public Service from the Bangor Region Chamber of Commerce.

== Family ==
She and her husband, David Lambert, live in Orono. Lambert is a plant pathologist in the University of Maine's School of Food and Agriculture.
