= Fish River (Maine) =

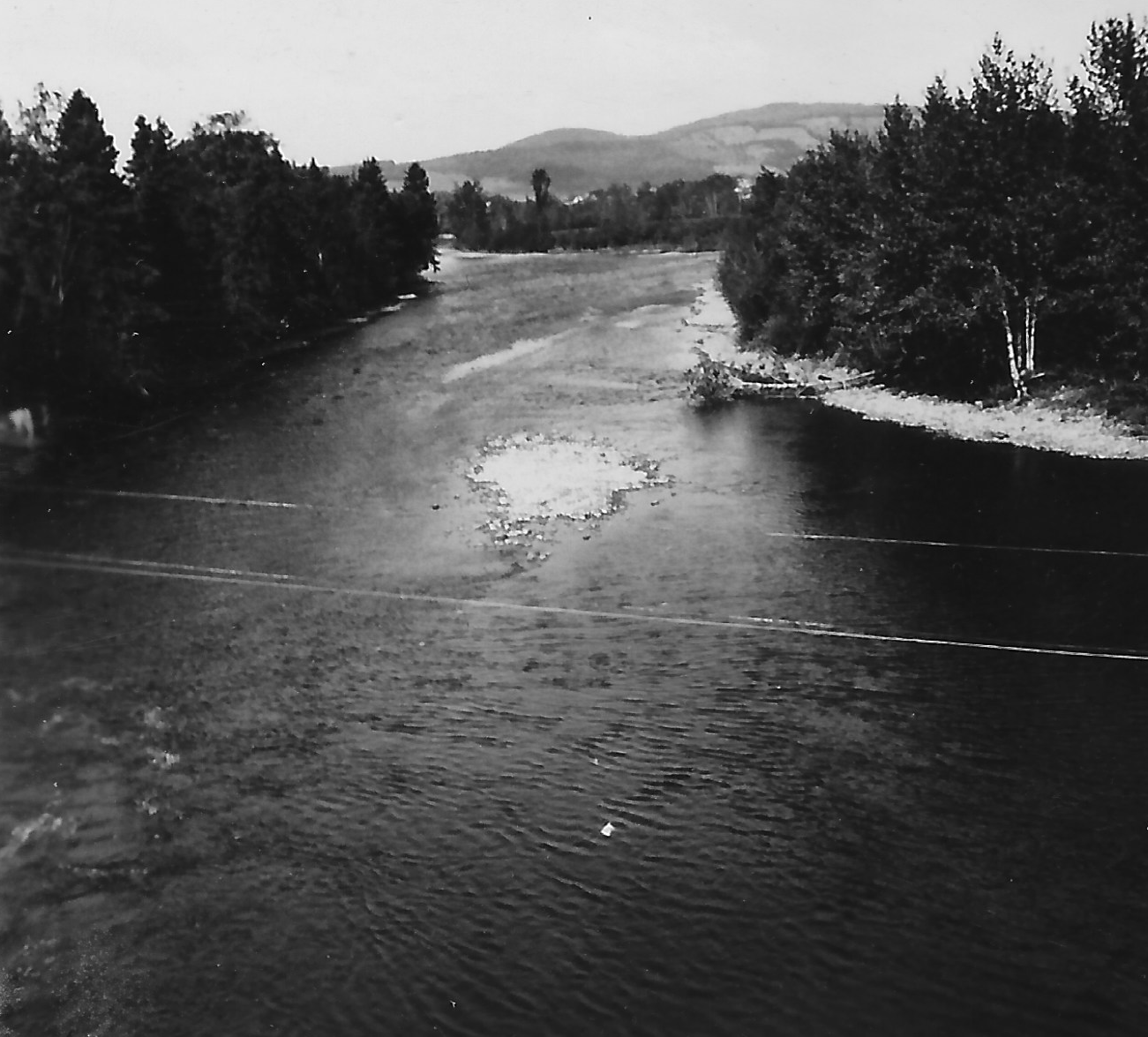
- Fish River in 1940 near its confluence with the Saint John River at Fort Kent, Maine

- Location within Maine Location within the United States

Location
- Country: United States

Physical characteristics
- Source
  - location: Maine
- Mouth
  - location: Saint John River
  - coordinates: 47°15′14″N 68°35′42″W
  - elevation: 500 feet (150 m)

The Fish River is a 69.9-mile-long (112.5 km) river in northern Maine in the United States. It is a tributary of the Saint John River, which flows to the Bay of Fundy (an arm of the Atlantic Ocean) in New Brunswick, Canada.

From its start at the confluence of Fox Brook and Carr Pond Stream (46°46′37″N 68°46′52″W), in Maine Township 13, Range 8, WELS, the river runs north to Fish River Lake, then east to Portage Lake. It then runs northwards through St. Froid Lake and Eagle Lake to the Saint John River at Fort Kent. The latter section is roughly parallel to Maine State Route 11.

== Fish River Lake ==
Fish River Lake
- Interactive map of Fish River Lake
- Location: Aroostook County, Maine
- Coordinates: 46°50′N 68°47′W
- Max. length: 4 mi (6.4 km)
- Surface area: 2,568 acres (1,039 ha)
- Water volume: 42,043 acre⋅ft (51,859,000 m^{3})
- Surface elevation: 716 ft (218 m)

Fish River Lake is on the border of range 8 townships 13 and 14. Fish River enters the south end of the lake 2 miles (3.2 km) downstream of the confluence of Fox Brook and Carr Pond Stream. Tributaries Smith Brook and Chase Brook flow into the west side of the lake from township 14, range 9. Fish River overflows the north end of the lake into Round Pond and then 12 miles (19 km) to Portage Lake.

== Portage Lake ==
Portage Lake
- Interactive map of Portage Lake
- Location: Aroostook County
- Coordinates: 46°46′N 68°30′W
- Max. length: 4.3 mi (6.9 km)
- Surface area: 2,258 acres (914 ha)
- Water volume: 18,971 acre⋅ft (23,400,000 m^{3})
- Surface elevation: 609 ft (186 m)

Portage Lake is entirely within the town of Portage Lake. Fish River enters the western end of the lake near the western edge of town and overflows the northern end of the lake near the northern edge of town. Tributary Mosquito Brook flows 8 miles (13 km) from township 14, range 7, into the northern part of the lake. The Bangor and Aroostook Railroad approaches from the south and runs along the eastern shore of the lake to follow the Fish River from Portage Lake all the way downstream to Fort Kent.

== Saint Froid Lake ==
Saint Froid Lake
- Interactive map of Saint Froid Lake
- Location: Aroostook County
- Coordinates: 46°57′N 68°37′W
- Max. length: 8 mi (13 km)
- Surface area: 2,339 acres (947 ha)
- Water volume: 93,853 acre⋅ft (115,766,000 m^{3})
- Surface elevation: 581 ft (177 m)

Fish River flows into the south end of Saint Froid Lake 10 miles (16 km) downstream of Portage Lake. Saint Froid Lake is almost entirely in Winterville Plantation. Tributary Red River flows 14 miles (23 km) from Pushineer Pond, Deboullie Pond, Gardner Pond, Galilee Pond, Denny Pond, Black Pond, Island Pond, Upper Pond, and Stink Pond in township 15, range 9, into the west side of Saint Froid Lake. The north end of Saint Froid Lake overflows into the Fish River 3 miles (4.8 km) upstream of Eagle Lake of the Fish River chain of lakes. The railroad follows the eastern shore of Saint Froid Lake and the western shore of Eagle Lake through the town of Eagle Lake and then follows the Fish River 13 miles (21 km) into Fort Kent.

== See also ==
- List of rivers of Maine
